= 6/45 =

6/45 may refer to:

- 6/45 (film), a 2022 South Korean film
- Mega Lotto 6/45, a lottery in the Philippines
