= Kwak Dong-yeon =

South Korean actor (born 1997)

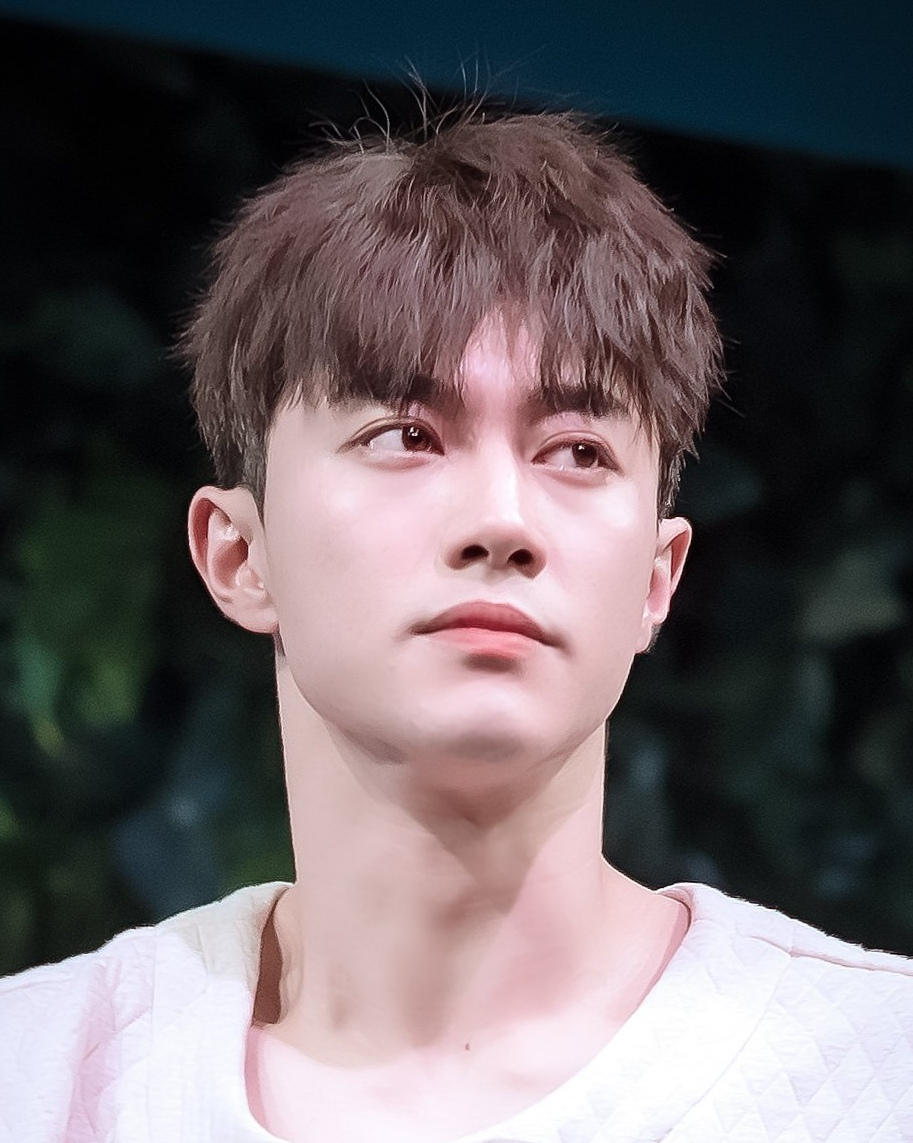
- Kwak in November 2019
- Born: 19 March 1997 (age 29); Daejeon, South Korea
- Education: School of Performing Arts Seoul
- Occupations: Actor; musician
- Years active: 2012–present
- Agent: The Black Label

Korean name
- Hangul: 곽동연
- Hanja: 郭東延
- RR: Gwak Dongyeon
- MR: Kwak Tongyŏn

Kwak Dong-yeon (Korean: 곽동연; born 19 March 1997) is a South Korean actor. He first gained wide recognition in 2016 for starring in the period drama Love in the Moonlight, and is also known for his roles in Gangnam Beauty (2018), Never Twice (2019), Vincenzo (2021), Big Mouth (2022), and Queen of Tears (2024).

== Early life and education ==
Kwak was born on 19 March 1997 in Daejeon, South Korea, He is the youngest and has a sister who is two years older than him

At 13, he permanently moved to Seoul by himself to pursue his dream to be an artist. He has been studying music at FNC Academy since 2010, and also took acting lessons. In February 2013, he graduated from Munrae Junior High School and graduated from School of Performing Arts Seoul in February 2016.

== Career ==
=== 2012–2015: Beginnings ===
Kwak was originally a lead guitarist and vocalist of Kokoma Band (literally, "Little Kids' Band"), a trainee band managed by FNC Entertainment, along with N.Flying's Seo Dongsung, KNK's Oh Heejun and Omega X's Lee Hwichan.

He made his acting debut in 2012, appearing in the KBS television series My Husband Got a Family. The drama reached a peak audience rating of 49.6%, thereby earning the "national drama" status. The series ranked number one overall on the 2012 yearly TV ratings chart. For his performance, Kwak won the Best Young Actor Award at the 2012 Korea Drama Awards.

In 2013, he featured as young Prince Dong-pyung in the SBS historical drama Jang Ok-jung, Living by Love. He then starred in the KBS Drama Special Puberty Medley, a coming-of-age drama based on the webtoon of the same name. The same year, Kwak featured in the KBS period drama Inspiring Generation playing the younger version of Kim Hyun-joong's character. His portrayal of a boy who struggled as the head of the family from an early age to fill the father's vacancy, garnered him a nomination at the 16th Seoul International Youth Film Festival for the Best Young Actor Award.

In March 2014, he took on the lead role in KBS Drama Special Middle School Girl A where he portrayed a smart transfer student who got bullied in his new school. He then starred in SBS weekend drama Modern Farmer, playing a drummer of a rock band who later moved to a village to be a farmer. In December 2014, Kwak's performances in the drama Inspiring Generation and the drama special Middle School Student A won him the Best Young Actor Award in the 2014 KBS Drama Awards.

In 2015, Kwak starred alongside Sistar's Bora in the web series The Flatterer, based on a webtoon of the same name. He portrayed Park Gun, an underdog high school student struggling to survive among the strong in a realistic and comical way. He also starred in a KBS2 Drama Special Avici, playing the role of a model student from an elite high school, but lacks the ability to empathize with others' pain, who tried his best to cover up his mom's murder.

=== 2016–present: Rising popularity ===
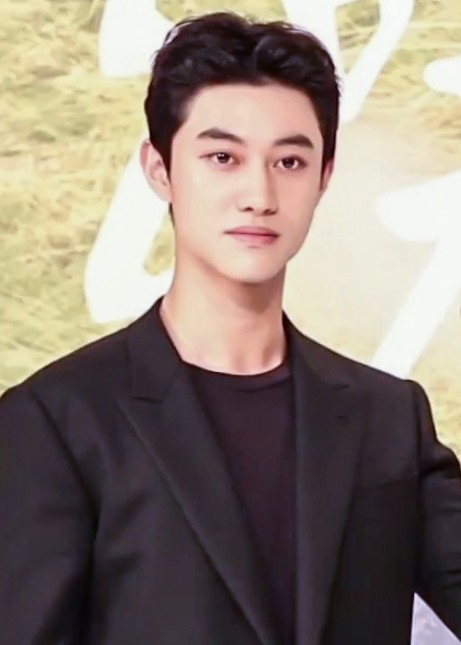
Kwak in August 2016

In 2016, he gained more recognition after co-starring in the hit KBS2 historical series Love in the Moonlight as a skilled swordsman known as Kim Byung-yeon. The role earned him a nomination for the Best New Actor at the 2016 KBS Drama Awards, and the 10th Korea Drama Awards. In 2017, Kwak made a guest appearance in drama Fight for My Way, as Kim Ji-won's ex-boyfriend, and played a supporting role in SBS fantasy romance drama Reunited Worlds.

In July 2017, Kwak was cast as Michael, the main protagonist in the Korean adaptation of The Elephant Song play, which ran from 6 September to 26 November at the former Suhyeonjae Theater in Seoul.

In 2017, Kwak starred as the main protagonist in a KBS2 drama special Slow. His portrayal of a frustrated baseball player "who fell into a slump, and was anxious about an uncertain future", garnered him a nomination for the Best Actor in a One-Act/Special/Short Drama Award at the 2017 KBS Drama Awards. On 27 November 2017, Kwak carried the Olympics flame for the 2018 Pyeongchang Games in Gokseong, South Jeolla province as part of the torch relay.

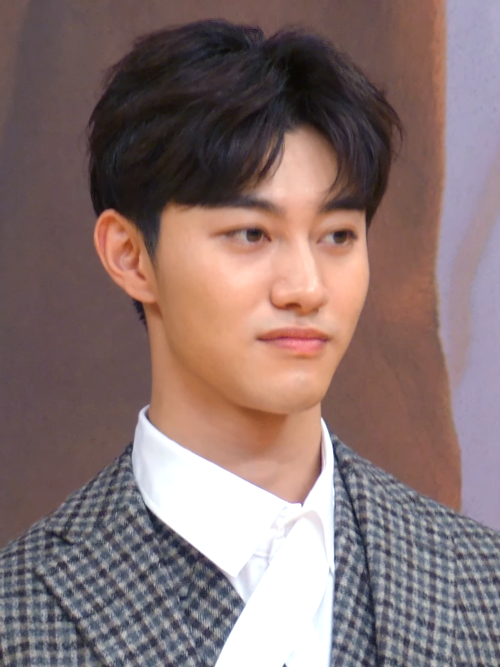
Kwak in November 2018

In 2018, he joined the cast of KBS romance drama Radio Romance, playing the role of a psychiatrist who is Ji Soo-ho (Yoon Doo-joon)'s high school classmate and personal doctor. He also starred in JTBC's romantic comedy series Gangnam Beauty, which was a hit and gained renewed recognition for Kwak. He then starred in SBS's romantic comedy drama My Strange Hero, which is Kwak's first villain role following his debut. The role earned him a nomination for the Excellence Award, Actor in a Miniseries at the 2019 SBS Drama Awards.

In December 2018, he won the Actor Award at the 2019 Korea First Brand Awards. In 2019, Kwak made a special appearance in SBS drama Doctor Detective, portraying Jung Ha-rang, a screen door service engineer from a vocational high school, who was destroyed by an industrial accident. Later in the same year, Kwak starred in the family drama Never Twice. He acted as the lead male role there with actress Park Se-wan. He played the role of Na Hae-jun, the heir of a five-star hotel. The performance earned him a nomination for the Excellence Award, Actor in a Weekend Drama at the 2019 MBC Drama Awards, and for the Excellent Award, Actor in Serial Drama at the 7th APAN Star Awards.

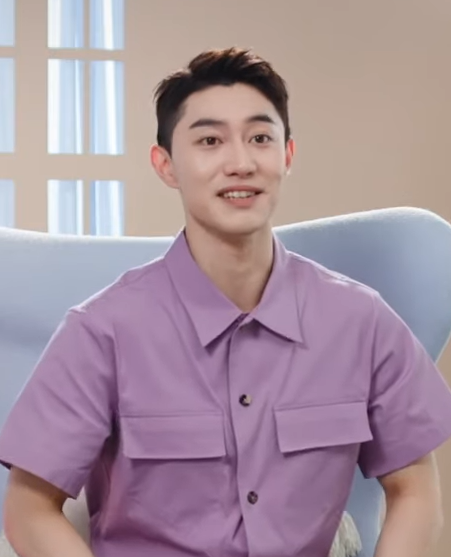
Kwak in June 2021

In October 2019, Kwak reprised his role in The Elephant Song, from 22 November 2019 to 16 February 2020. In 2020, he appeared in sports film Baseball Girl. He also made a special appearance in the tvN drama It's Okay to Not Be Okay. Kwak takes on the role of a manic patient with exhibitionism in the drama. In June 2020, it was announced that Kwak would be a part of the cast in the Korean adaptation of the musical comedy Something Rotten!. He played the role of Nigel Bottom, a genius playwright who is also pure and passionate. The performance earned him a nomination for the Rookie of the Year Award, Male category at the 5th Korea Musical Awards. The play ran from 7 August to 18 October at the Chungmu Art Center Grand Theater. In August 2020, Kwak signed with new agency H& Entertainment after leaving FNC Entertainment.

In February 2021, Kwak starred in tvN television series Vincenzo. He played the role of Jang Han-seo, the half-brother of Jang Jun-woo portrayed by Taecyeon, who publicly acts as chairman in his brother's place. In May 2021, Kwak joined SBS variety show Delicious Rendezvous along with Choi Won-young and Choi Ye-bin. In 2022, Kwak appeared in the movie 6/45 as an observer in the South Korean front force and in the MBC drama Big Mouth as a convicted scammer called Jerry.

In 2024, Kwak appeared in the Queen of Tears as a third-generation chaebol of Queens Group. From December 6, 2024, to February 7, 2025, he starred in tvN's travel show Rented in Finland.

In 2026, Kwak starred in tvN's television show The Village Barber. In April, Kwak signed an exclusive contract with The Black Label.

== Personal life ==
On 26 February 2014, not long after Kwak finished his Inspiring Generation drama promotion, his mother died of an illness.

== Filmography ==
=== Film ===
Year	Title	Role	Notes	Ref.
2016	Misbehavior	Yoo Jong-ki		
2017	Man of Will	Choi Yoon-suk		
2018	Heung-boo: The Revolutionist	Sheddong		
2019	Baseball Girl	Lee Jung-ho		
2022	6/45	Kim Man-cheol		
2022	Far East	Kang Young-sik	Sound film	
2024	Love in the Big City	Jun soo		

=== Television series ===
Year	Title	Role	Notes	Ref.
2012	My Husband Got a Family	Bang Jang-goon		
2013	Jang Ok-jung, Living by Love	young Prince Dong-pyeong	Cameo	
2013	Puberty Medley	Choi Jeong-woo		
2014	Inspiring Generation	young Shin Jung-tae	Cameo (Episode 1–4)	
2014	Middle School Student A	Lee Hae-joon	Drama special	
2014	Modern Farmer	Han Ki-joon		
2015	Avici	Ji Sun-woo	Drama special	
2016	Come Back Mister	young Han Gi-tak	Cameo	
2016	Puck!	Hwang Gyung-pil		
2016	Pied Piper	Jung In	Cameo (Episode 4)	
2016	The Master of Revenge	Lee Yong-joo	Cameo (Episode 5–7)	
2016	Love in the Moonlight	Kim Byung-yeon		
2017	Fight for My Way	Kim Moo-ki	Cameo (Episode 1)	
2017	Reunited Worlds	Sung Hae-cheol		
2017	Slow	Lee Ji-won	Drama special	
2018	Radio Romance	Jason		
2018	Gangnam Beauty	Yeon Woo-young		
2018–2019	My Strange Hero	Oh Se-ho		
2019	Doctor Detective	Jung Ha-rang	Cameo (Episode 1–3)	
2019–2020	Never Twice	Na Hae-jun		
2020	It's Okay to Not Be Okay	Kwon Gi-do	Cameo (Episode 3–4,16)	
2021	Vincenzo	Jang Han-seo		
2021	Attention Hog	Kang Tae-soo	Drama Stage	
2021	Our Beloved Summer	Artist Nu-ah	Cameo (Episode 4,6,15)	
2022	Big Mouth	Jerry / Oh Jin-chul		
2022	Gaus Electronics	Lee Sang-sik		
2024	Queen of Tears	Hong Soo-cheol		

=== Web series ===
Year	Title	Role	Ref.
2015	The Flatterer	Park Ge-on	
2022	Monstrous	Kwak Yong-ju	
2026	The East Palace	Crown Prince	

=== Television shows ===
Year	Title	Role	Notes	Ref.
2013	Cheongdam-dong 111	Cast member		
2015	Animals	Cast member		
2017	Our School of Life	Cast member		
2019	Everyone's Kitchen	Cast member		
2021	Delicious Rendezvous	Cast member	with Baek Jong-won, Yang Se-hyung, Choi Won-young and Choi Ye-bin	
2024–2025	Rented in Finland	Cast member		
2026	The Village Barber	Cast member		

=== Web shows ===
Year	Title	Role	Notes	Ref.
2019	Let's go! Real trip: Three Delicious Man	Cast member		
2022	Young Actors' Retreat	Cast member		

=== Music video appearances ===
Year	Song title	Artist	Notes	Ref.
2012	"Ce Song"	Yoo Jun-sang ft. Kwak Dong-yeon, Kim Sang-ho	My Husband Got a Family OST	
2013	"Stargirl 2013"	Bulldog Mansion	Puberty Medley OST	
2013	"Be Forgotten"	Kwak Dong-yeon	Puberty Medley OST	
2017	"Excuse Me"	AOA		
2019	"Spring Memories"	N.Flying	With Jin Ye-ju	

=== Radio ===
Year	Title	Role	Notes	Ref.
2022	This is Ahn Young-mi, the date muse at two o'clock	Special DJ	12–17 October	

== Theatre ==
Year	Title	Role	Notes	Ref.
2017	The Elephant Song	Michael	Theatre	
2019	The Elephant Song	Michael	Theatre	
2020	Something Rotten!	Nigel Bottom	Musical	
2022–2023	Old Wicked Songs	Stephen Hoffman	Musical	
2024	The Elephant Song	Michael	Theatre	
2024	Waiting for Godot	Ester	Theatre	

== Awards and nominations ==
Name of the award ceremony, year presented, category, nominee of the award, and the result of the nomination
Award ceremony	Year	Category	Nominee / Work	Result	Ref.
APAN Star Awards	2021	Excellence Award, Actor in Serial Drama	Never Twice	Nominated	
KBS Drama Awards	2012	Best Young Actor	My Husband Got a Family	Nominated	
KBS Drama Awards	2014	Best Young Actor	Inspiring Generation; Middle School Student A	Won	
KBS Drama Awards	2016	Best New Actor	Love in the Moonlight	Nominated	
KBS Drama Awards	2017	Best Actor in a One-Act/Special/Short Drama	Slow	Nominated	
Korea Drama Awards	2012	Best Young Actor	My Husband Got a Family	Won	
Korea Drama Awards	2017	Best New Actor	Love in the Moonlight	Nominated	
Korea First Brand Awards	2019	Actor	Kwak Dong-yeon	Won	
Korea Musical Awards	2020	Rookie of the Year Award (Male)	Something Rotten!	Nominated	
MBC Drama Awards	2019	Excellence Award, Actor in a Weekend Drama	Never Twice	Nominated	
SBS Drama Awards	2019	Excellence Award, Actor in a Miniseries	My Strange Hero	Nominated	
Scene Stealer Festival	2023	Bonsang "Main Prize"	6/45; Big Mouth; Gaus Electronics	Won	
Seoul International Youth Film Festival	2014	Best Young Actor	Inspiring Generation	Nominated	
