= Everyone's Kitchen =

- Genre: Food; Cooking; Reality
- Starring: Kang Ho-dong; Lee Chung-ah; Hwang Kwang-hee; Kwak Dong-yeon; Sakura Miyawaki (IZ*ONE)
- Country of origin: South Korea
- Original language: Korean
- No. of seasons: 1
- No. of episodes: Pilot + Regular: 11

Production
- Production location: South Korea
- Running time: 75 minutes

Original release
- Network: Olive
- Release: 29 December 2018
- Release: 24 February – 28 April 2019

Everyone's Kitchen (Korean: 모두의 주방) is a South Korean television program that aired on Olive.

The pilot episode was aired on December 29, 2018 at 18:00 (KST). The program became regular beginning February 24 until April 28, 2019, and aired on Sundays at 19:40 (KST).

== Program ==
The program mainly focuses on "Social Dining", which is what was lacking a lot following an increase in small families and single families. Kang Ho-dong, the main protagonist of the show, has only been eating together with friends he knew for many years throughout his entertainment career (Lee Soo-geun, Eun Ji-won, and friends he knew from filming of 2 Days & 1 Night), and thought he has been tired of it. He also rarely had meals together with other casts of his other programs. Therefore, he attempts to reunite with his old friends and get to know new friends through his own cooking.

The casts and guests invited for this program mostly have experience in cooking or living alone and they will each whip up a dish based on their own recipe(s) that they want to share.

Starting from episode 4, there is a semi-fixed segment in the program titled "Kkura Show", which besides allowing Sakura Miyawaki to strengthen her Korean, she can get to learn hosting, variety skills and interviewing skills under the guidance of Kang Ho-dong.

== Cast ==
- Kang Ho-dong
- Lee Chung-ah (absent for episode 6)
- Hwang Kwang-hee (absent for episodes 5, 9-10)
- Kwak Dong-yeon (absent for episodes 2, 4, 6-11)
- Sakura Miyawaki (IZ*ONE) (absent for episodes 3, 5, 7, 10)

== Episodes ==
Ep.	Broadcast Date	Title	Guest(s)	Note(s)
Pilot (1)	December 29, 2018	Everyone's First Time (모두의 처음)	—	
2	February 24, 2019	Goodbye, Winter (굿바이, 겨울)	Kim Yong-gun, Chani (SF9)	Kwak Dong-yeon is absent
3	March 3, 2019	Everyone's Spring (모두의 봄)	Kim Jung-nan, Taemin (SHINee)	Sakura Miyawaki is absent
4	March 10, 2019	An Emotional Day (어느 감성 돋는 날)	Lee Tae-gon, Lee Hong-gi (F.T. Island)	Kwak Dong-yeon is absent
5	March 17, 2019	Our House Recipes (우리 집 레시피)	Shiho Yano, Go Soo-hee, Boom	Hwang Kwang-hee and Sakura Miyawaki are absent
6	March 24, 2019	Sea Village Spring Picnic (바다 마을 봄 소풍)	Kim Yong-gun, Gummy, Lee Elijah	Lee Chung-ah and Kwak Dong-yeon are absent
7	March 31, 2019	We Loved Each Other At That Time (그 시절 우리가 사랑했던)	Shin Sung-woo, David Lee McInnis, Jin Ji-hee	Kwak Dong-yeon and Sakura Miyawaki are absent
8	April 7, 2019	Land, Sea, Sky and Dining Table (땅, 바다, 하늘 그리고 식탁)	Yoo Min-sang, Wendy (Red Velvet)	Kwak Dong-yeon is absent Surprise appearance by Hyelin (EXID)
9	April 14, 2019	Let's Eat, My Friend (친구야 밥 먹자)	Eun Ji-won (Sechs Kies), Kyung Soo-jin, Park Ji-bin	Hwang Kwang-hee and Kwak Dong-yeon are absent
10	April 21, 2019	Powerful Unnies and Timid Men (센 언니와 소심남)	Kim Yong-gun, Oh Yoon-ah, Nam Chang-hee, Cheetah	Hwang Kwang-hee, Kwak Dong-yeon and Sakura Miyawaki are absent
11	April 28, 2019	We'll Meet Again (우리 다시 만나)	Yiruma, Chungha	Kwak Dong-yeon is absent
