= Risky Romance =

South Korean television series

- Promotional poster
- Hangul: 사생결단 로맨스
- RR: Sasaenggyeoldan romaenseu
- MR: Sasaenggyŏltan romaensŭ
- Genre: Medical drama; Romance
- Created by: Son Hyung-seok for MBC
- Written by: Kim Nam-hee; Heo Seung-min
- Directed by: Lee Chang-han
- Starring: Ji Hyun-woo; Lee Si-young; Kim Jin-yeop; Yoon Joo-hee
- Country of origin: South Korea
- Original language: Korean
- No. of episodes: 32 (Note: In order to circumvent Korean laws that prevent commercial breaks in the middle of an episode, what would previously have been aired as single 70 minute episodes are now being repackaged as two 35 minute episodes, with two episodes being shown each night with a commercial break between the two.)

Production
- Executive producers: Jung Tae-sang; Lim Sung-gyun
- Camera setup: Single-camera
- Running time: 35 minutes
- Production companies: JH Media (Note: A subsidiary of China Wit Media Co., Ltd.); SAYON Media

Original release
- Network: MBC TV
- Release: July 23 – September 17, 2018

Risky Romance (Korean: 사생결단 로맨스) is a South Korean television series starring Ji Hyun-woo, Lee Si-young, Kim Jin-yeop and Yoon Joo-hee. It aired on MBC from July 23 to September 17, 2018 on Mondays and Tuesdays at 22:00 (KST).

== Synopsis ==
The romance story of an excellent neurosurgeon and a determined endocrinologist. Han Seung-joo (Ji Hyun-woo) used to be a warm and an understanding person, but after the death of a close friend, he became a hot-headed person and merciless towards others. After listening to the rumors of how Seung-joo has turned into a completely different person, Joo In-ah (Lee Si-young) can't help but feel intrigued towards him, believing that all of that temper is because of hormones. She is determined to make him as her patient, and run a blood test on him to check on his hormone levels. From then, their rivalry begins.

== Cast ==
=== Main ===
- Ji Hyun-woo as Han Seung-joo

A talented neurosurgeon with an extraordinary memory and a logical approach to things. However, his feisty personality and competitiveness makes him unstoppable when he fixates on something.

- Lee Si-young as Joo In-ah

A hormone-obsessed woman who believes that life is controlled entirely by them.

- Kim Jin-yeop as Cha Jae-hwan

Son of the hospital director. A neurosurgeon with talent, wealth and looks.

- Yoon Joo-hee as Joo Se-ra

Joo In-ah's stepsister. A TV announcer who is pursuing Cha Jae-hwan.

=== Supporting ===
- Sunwoo Sun as Jang Ji-yeon
- Jang Se-hyun as Jung Hyun-woo
- Choi Ryung as Yoo Sang-bum
- Bae Seul-ki as Lee Jin-kyung
- Shin Won-ho as Choi Jae-seung
- In A as Lee Mi-woon
- Jeon No-min as Cha Jung-tae

Cha Jae-hwan's father, who is the head of the same hospital Joo In-ah and Han Seung-joo are working for.

- Choi Sung-min as Min-ki
- Park Han-sol as Jang Han-ah
- Son Jong-bum as Park Il-won

== Production ==
- The first script reading took place on May 3, 2018 at MBC Broadcasting Station in Sangam, South Korea.
- The drama reunites Ji Hyun-woo with Lee Si-young who previously starred together in Becoming a Billionaire.
- Lee Yo-won was offered the female lead but declined.
- When the series was still in development at MBC, it had the working title Emotional Technology/Technology of Emotions (감정의 기술; Gamjeongui gisul).

== Original soundtrack ==
Risky Romance OST

Soundtrack album by Various artists
- Released: 2018
- Genre: Soundtrack
- Languages: Korean; English
- Labels: TAJOY Entertainment, kakao M

=== Part 1 ===
Released on July 23, 2018
No.	Title	Lyrics	Music	Artist	Length
1.	"The More" (더더더)	KZ	KZ, Nthonius, Yoo Sang-gyun	NC.A	03:23
2.	"The More" (Inst.)		KZ, Nthonius, Yoo Sang-gyun		03:23
Total length:					06:46

=== Part 2 ===
Released on July 24, 2018
No.	Title	Lyrics	Music	Artist	Length
1.	"Rainy Romance" (빗길로맨스)	Jeon Chang-yeob, 5959Mont	Jeon Chang-yeob, 5959Mont	Migyo	04:06
2.	"Rainy Romance" (Inst.)		Jeon Chang-yeob, 5959Mont		04:06
Total length:					08:12

=== Part 3 ===
Released on July 30, 2018
No.	Title	Lyrics	Music	Artist	Length
1.	"Tremble" (떨려와)	Jeon Chang-yeob, Ahn Soo-wan	Jeon Chang-yeob, Ahn Soo-wan	Monogram	04:02
2.	"Tremble" (Inst.)		Jeon Chang-yeob, Ahn Soo-wan		04:02
Total length:					08:04

=== Part 4 ===
Released on August 6, 2018
No.	Title	Lyrics	Music	Artist	Length
1.	"I Won't Do That" (그러지 않을래요)	Gong Chan-soo	Gong Chan-soo	DK (December)	03:50
2.	"I Won't Do That" (Inst.)		Gong Chan-soo		03:50
Total length:					07:40

=== Part 5 ===
Released on August 15, 2018
No.	Title	Lyrics	Music	Artist	Length
1.	"I'll Love You" (널 사랑할께)	Ji Hoon	79	Punch	03:26
2.	"I'll Love You" (Inst.)		79		03:26
Total length:					06:52

=== Part 6 ===
Released on August 20, 2018
No.	Title	Lyrics	Music	Artist	Length
1.	"Don't Cross Over The Line" (선 넘어오지마)	Lee Bada	Lee Bada, Young Spot, Jo Chang-hyun	Lee Bada	02:51
2.	"Don't Cross Over The Line" (Inst.)		Lee Bada, Young Spot, Jo Chang-hyun		02:51
Total length:					05:42

=== Part 7 ===
Released on August 27, 2018
No.	Title	Lyrics	Music	Artist	Length
1.	"Romance"	Jeff Bernat	Jeff Bernat, J Bird	Jeff Bernat	03:13
2.	"Romance" (Inst.)		Jeff Bernat, J Bird		03:13
Total length:					06:26

=== Part 8 ===
Released on September 3, 2018
No.	Title	Lyrics	Music	Artist	Length
1.	"Sound of Love"	Go Woon	Go Woon	Han Hee-jeong	03:10
2.	"Sound of Love" (Inst.)		Go Woon		03:10
Total length:					06:20

=== Part 9 ===
Released on September 12, 2018
No.	Title	Lyrics	Music	Artist	Length
1.	"That One Word" (그 한마디)	Haksun	Haksun	Haksun, Youngeun	03:15
2.	"That One Word" (Inst.)		Haksun		03:15
Total length:					06:30

== Ratings ==
- In the table below, the blue numbers represent the lowest ratings and the red numbers represent the highest ratings.
- NR denotes that the drama did not rank in the top 20 daily programs on that date.
- N/A denotes that the rating is not known.

Ep.	Original broadcast date	Average audience share			
Ep.	Original broadcast date	TNmS		AGB Nielsen	
Ep.	Original broadcast date	Nationwide	Seoul	Nationwide	Seoul
1	July 23, 2018	3.6%	3.8%	4.1% (NR)	4.3% (NR)
2	July 23, 2018	3.7%	4.0%	3.5% (NR)	3.8% (NR)
3	July 24, 2018	2.7%	2.8%	2.7% (NR)	2.9% (NR)
4	July 24, 2018	2.7%	2.9%	3.1% (NR)	3.2% (NR)
5	July 30, 2018	3.0%	3.1%	2.6% (NR)	2.7% (NR)
6	July 30, 2018	3.5%	3.6%	3.1% (NR)	3.3% (NR)
7	July 31, 2018	3.3%	3.4%	2.9% (NR)	3.0% (NR)
8	July 31, 2018	3.8%	3.9%	3.4% (NR)	3.5% (NR)
9	August 6, 2018	2.7%	2.8%	2.3% (NR)	2.4% (NR)
10	August 6, 2018	3.0%	3.1%	2.6% (NR)	2.7% (NR)
11	August 7, 2018	3.1%	3.2%	2.7% (NR)	2.8% (NR)
12	August 7, 2018	3.3%	3.4%	2.9% (NR)	3.0% (NR)
13	August 13, 2018	2.5%	3.4%	2.9% (NR)	3.1% (NR)
14	August 13, 2018	2.4%	3.7%	3.2% (NR)	3.3% (NR)
15	August 14, 2018	3.5%	3.6%	3.1% (NR)	3.2% (NR)
16	August 14, 2018	3.9%	4.0%	3.5% (NR)	3.6% (NR)
17	August 21, 2018	3.0%	3.2%	2.6% (NR)	2.8% (NR)
18	August 21, 2018	3.2%	3.3%	2.8% (NR)	3.0% (NR)
19	August 28, 2018	2.3%	2.4%	1.9% (NR)	2.0% (NR)
20	August 28, 2018	2.6%	2.7%	2.2% (NR)	2.3% (NR)
21	September 3, 2018	—N/a	—N/a	2.2% (NR)	—N/a
22	September 3, 2018	—N/a	—N/a	2.5% (NR)	—N/a
23	September 4, 2018	—N/a	—N/a	2.8% (NR)	—N/a
24	September 4, 2018	—N/a	—N/a	3.5% (NR)	—N/a
25	September 10, 2018	—N/a	—N/a	2.8% (NR)	—N/a
26	September 10, 2018	—N/a	—N/a	3.0% (NR)	—N/a
27	September 11, 2018	—N/a	—N/a	2.5% (NR)	—N/a
28	September 11, 2018	—N/a	—N/a	2.8% (NR)	—N/a
29	September 17, 2018	—N/a	—N/a	2.3% (NR)	—N/a
30	September 17, 2018	—N/a	—N/a	2.9% (NR)	—N/a
31	September 17, 2018	—N/a	—N/a	2.2% (NR)	—N/a
32	September 17, 2018	—N/a	—N/a	2.5% (NR)	—N/a
Average		N/A	N/A	2.8%	N/A

- Episodes 17 and 18 did not air on August 20 due to the coverage of the 2018 Asian Games.
- Episodes 19 and 20 did not air on August 27 due to the coverage of the 2018 Asian Games.

== Awards and nominations ==
Year	Award	Category	Recipient	Result	Ref.
2018	2018 MBC Drama Awards	Top Excellence Award, Actor in a Monday-Tuesday Miniseries	Ji Hyun-woo	Nominated	
2018	2018 MBC Drama Awards	Top Excellence Award, Actress in a Monday-Tuesday Miniseries	Lee Si-young	Nominated	
2018	2018 MBC Drama Awards	Excellence Award, Actress in a Monday-Tuesday Miniseries	Yoon Joo-hee	Nominated	
