= Lee Si-young =

South Korean actress and boxer (born 1982)

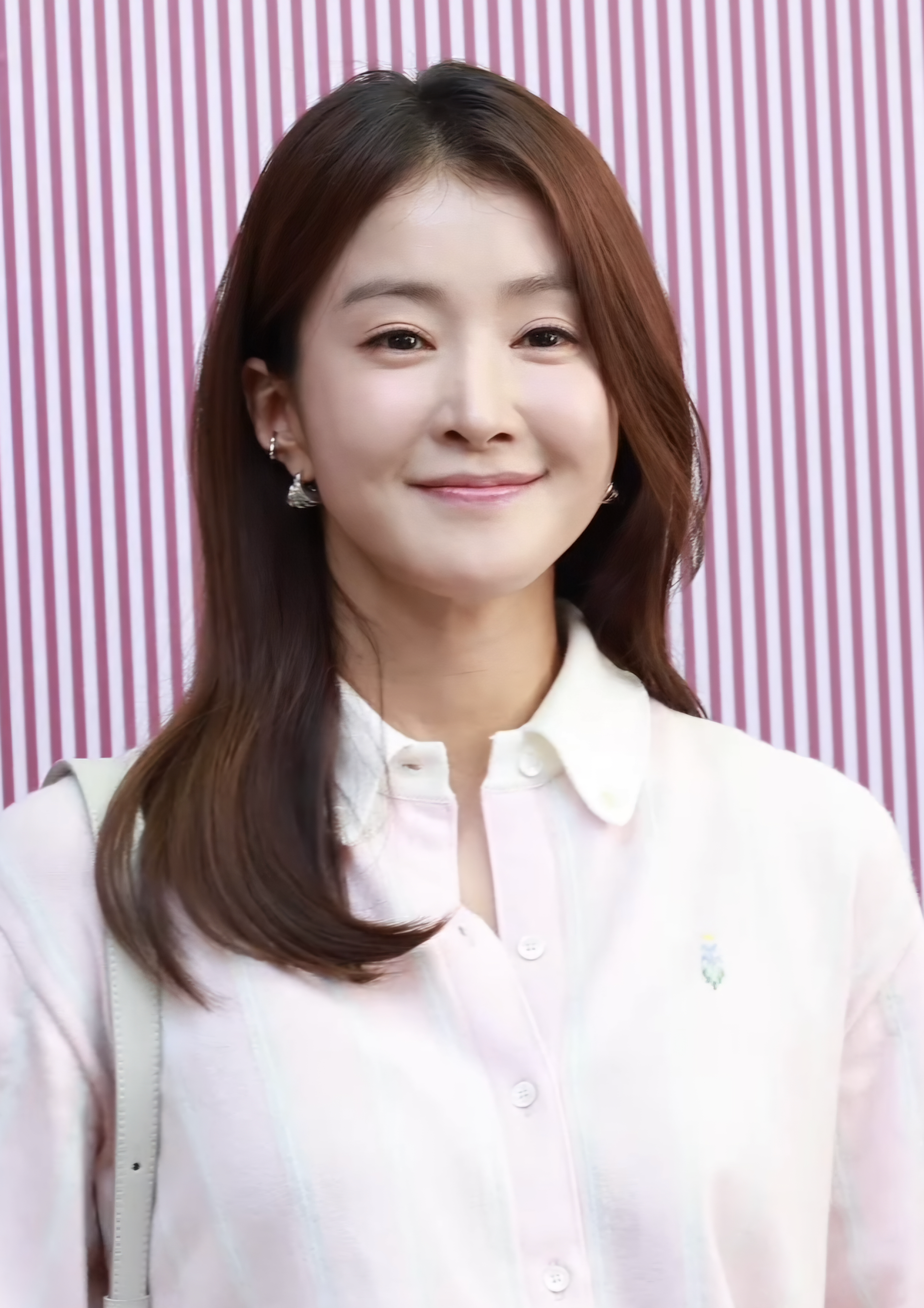
- Lee in April 2025
- Born: Lee Eun-rae; April 17, 1982 (age 44); Cheongwon County, North Chungcheong Province, South Korea
- Education: Dongduk Women's University
- Occupations: Actress; amateur boxer
- Years active: 2008–present
- Agent: Ace Factory
- Spouse: Cho Seong-hyun (m. 2017; div. 2025)
- Children: 2

Korean name
- Hangul: 이시영
- Hanja: 李施昤
- RR: I Siyeong
- MR: I Siyŏng

Former name
- Hangul: 이은래
- RR: I Eunrae
- MR: I Ŭllae

Lee Si-young (Korean: 이시영; born April 17, 1982) is a South Korean actress and former amateur boxer.

== Early life ==
Born Lee Eun-rae in Cheongwon County, North Chungcheong Province, South Korea), her family moved to Seoul when she was 9 years old. Lee majored in Fashion Design at Dongduk Women's University, and later changed her name to Lee Si-young.

== Career ==
=== Acting ===
Lee made her acting debut in 2008 in a guest appearance on season 3 of the Super Action TV procedural Urban Legends Deja Vu, followed by the historical drama "The Kingdom of The Winds".

In 2009 Lee began to gain attention with several high-profile supporting roles. In the smash hit Boys Over Flowers, Lee played the character of Sakurako Sanjo in the source manga Hana Yori Dango, who was mercilessly teased for being homely as a young girl, then undergoes extensive plastic surgery and becomes a backstabbing frenemy to win the heart of her tormentor. Lee then played the mistress of a married man in the surrogacy melodrama Loving You a Thousand Times.

Five Senses of Eros was an omnibus film from five different directors, and in the segment "Believe in the Moment" three teenage couples decide to swap partners for 24 hours, played by Lee and her fellow up-and-coming actors Kim Dong-wook, Song Joong-ki, Shin Se-kyung, Jung Eui-chul and Lee Sung-min. In the comedy Descendants of Hong Gil-dong (also known as The Righteous Thief), Lee played the love interest of Lee Beom-soo, whose character is the 18th descendant of Hong Gil-dong, a Joseon-era Robin Hood whose family for generations has passed down the tradition of stealing only from the rich and giving to the poor while keeping their actions secret. In 2009, she rose to mainstream popularity when she joined the cast of We Got Married, a reality show about fake married couples, and was paired with Jun Jin of the boy band Shinhwa. Called the "Gundam couple" by fans for their mutual love of the anime, Lee and Jun Jin began dating off-screen, making them the first couple to officially have a real relationship outside the show. However, after dating for 6 months, they broke up in September 2009.

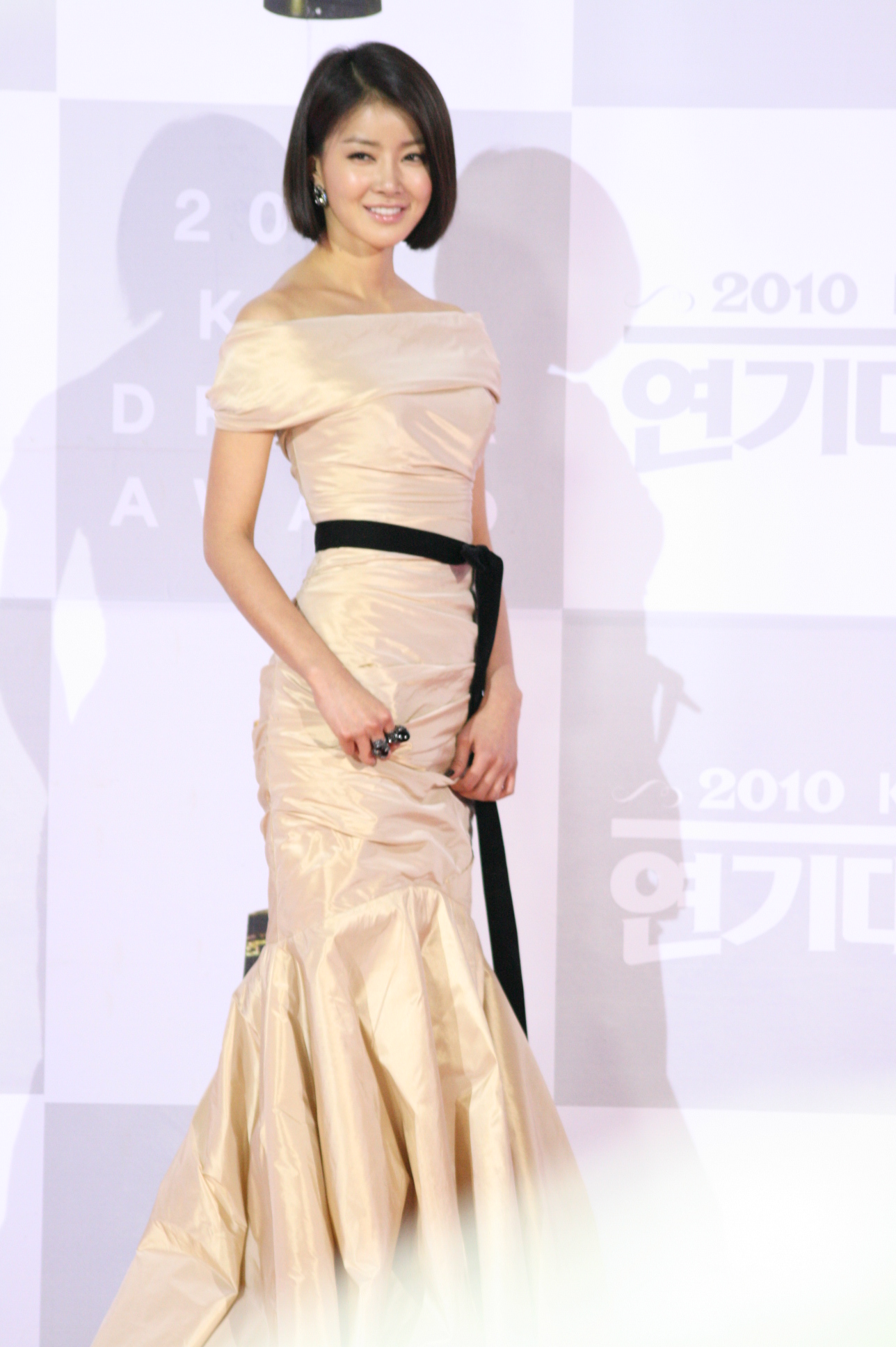
Lee at the 2010 KBS Drama Awards

In 2010, she began hosting Entertainment Relay (also known as Entertainment Weekly), the longest-running entertainment news show on Korean television (her stint ended in 2012). Then in Birth of the Rich (also known as Becoming a Billionaire), Lee was the standout in the cast and was praised for her portrayal of a spoiled, Paris Hilton-esque chaebol heiress, despite mixed reviews for the series itself. Later that year, she starred in Playful Kiss, another series adapted from a manga (in Itazura na Kiss, her character is Sasuiko, a haughty paragon of perfection who becomes the heroine's rival in love). Lee had acquired a reputation for making her second-lead roles memorable and endearing in their own right, giving her characters a human, lovable side despite their role as antagonists in the narrative.

Lee played her first big screen leading role in the screwball romantic comedy Meet the In-Laws, which portrays the struggles of a comic book writer (played by Song Sae-byeok) to tie the knot with his girlfriend (Lee) over the strong disapproval of their families, as they come from different regions with a long history of antagonism toward each other (the Korean title literally translates to "Dangerous Formal Greeting Between Families of the Bride and Bridegroom"). Meet the In-Laws became the ninth top-grossing Korean film of 2011, with more than 2 million tickets sold.

Lee's follow-up was the ensemble romantic comedy/caper film Couples, where she again displayed her gift for physical comedy as a shameless gold digger. Despite critical praise for its cleverly constructed plot and twists, the film was less successful at the box office. Then in the low-rating action series Poseidon, Lee, along with Lee Sung-jae and Choi Si-won played members of the Coast Guard special forces who investigate maritime crimes.

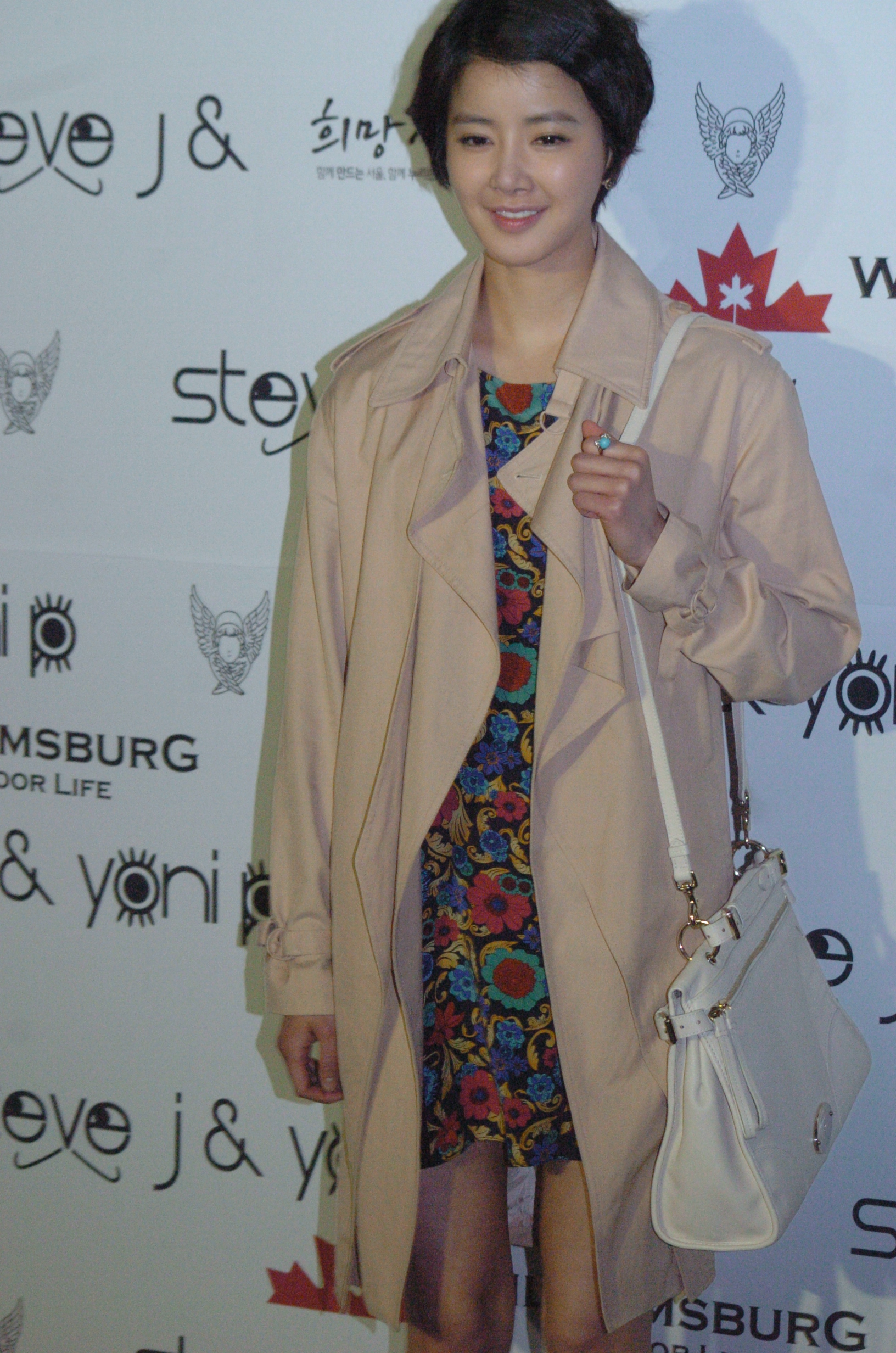
Lee at the 2012 F/W Seoul Fashion Week

In 2012, Lee cut her hair into a short perm for Wild Romance, playing a tomboyish bodyguard who protects an arrogant baseball star after he receives death threats (played by Lee Dong-wook). Lee said, "I don't see many actresses who are good at tough action roles. I hope I can fill the gap." The series received low ratings but had a cult following.

Lee returned to the romantic comedy genre in 2013 with How to Use Guys with Secret Tips, playing an overworked and undervalued assistant director who one day buys an inspirational video, "Instructions on How to Use Men," and reluctantly follows its guidelines. She becomes drastically transformed into a woman much-sought after by all men, including a top actor (played by Oh Jung-se). The film received strong word of mouth for its comic timing and witty gags, the charismatic performances of its leads and its tackling of gender equality issues.

She then headlined the horror film Killer Toon, playing a writer of webcomics (called "webtoon" in Korea) who becomes the number one suspect after a series of murders are committed that mimic her famous comics. Co-starring Um Ki-joon as the detective on the case, the movie overlaps crime scenes with CG animation. In an interview, Lee said she picks roles if she is drawn to and can empathize with the character. Killer Toon attracted more than 1 million viewers, only the third Korean horror film to do so after A Tale of Two Sisters (2003) and Death Bell (2008).

In 2014, Lee was cast as a principled prosecutor in the drama series Golden Cross. She also starred in the film The Divine Move, about a baduk player's quest for revenge. This was followed later in the year by Righteous Love from cable channel tvN, in which her character has an extramarital affair.

Lee next played a detective in the 2015 suspense thriller series My Beautiful Bride on cable channel OCN, about a man searching for his fiancée who mysteriously disappears.

In 2017, Lee starred in MBC's action thriller The Guardians.

In 2018, Lee returned to the small-screen after her marriage and childbirth with the medical drama Risky Romance, reuniting with Becoming a Billionaire co-star Ji Hyun-woo.

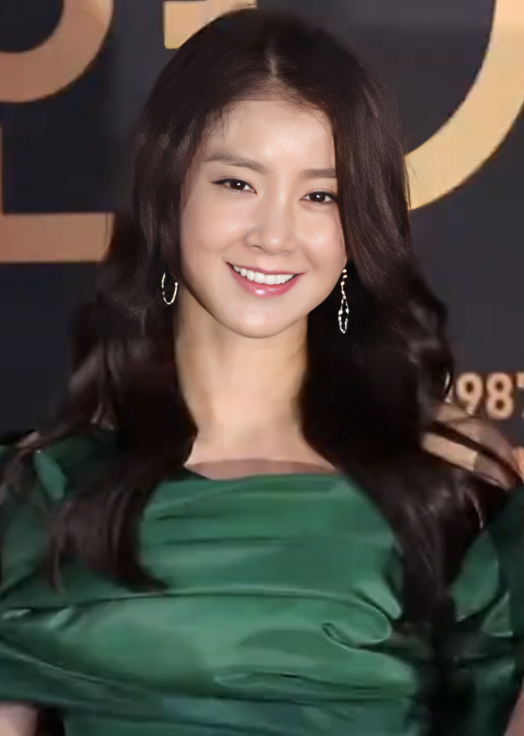
Lee at the 2019 KBS Drama Awards

In 2019, Lee starred in the action film No Mercy and in the family drama Liver or Die.

In January 2020, Lee signed with new management agency Ace Factory. That same year, Lee starred in the apocalyptic horror Netflix series, Sweet Home.

=== Music ===
Lee never formally debuted as a singer, but she has made contributions to several of her films' soundtracks. She was also featured in one track on then-boyfriend Jun Jin's EP Fascination in 2009. And after she sang two tracks on Honey Family's fifth album Resurrection in 2010, band member Park Myung-ho praised Lee for her vocal talent.

In 2012, she and Jay Park appeared in Music and Lyrics, an MBC M reality show in which an actress and a male singer are paired together as lyricist and composer, respectively, to create a song, showing their meetings and songwriting process. The song they composed, Polaris, was recorded by the girl group Tiny-G.

=== Boxing ===
Aside from her entertainment career. Lee was an amateur boxer. Despite taking up the sport in her late 20s and fighting opponents who are much more experienced and younger, in just three years, Lee established herself in the sport by winning a number of amateur titles in the 48-kg class.

She initially took up boxing in early 2010 to prepare for her role as a female boxer in a TV drama for MBC, training with Hong Soo-hwan, a former WBA bantamweight and super bantamweight champion. The drama ended up not getting produced, but she quickly became enamored of the sport. Lee said, "I kept it up as a hobby and was told that I had potential, so I trained really hard. Boxing changed who I am. I became more honest and extroverted, with more confidence in who I am." She continued training, reducing her body fat from 9.9 kg to 4.7 kg, and began boxing competitively.

Lee's passion for the sport caused her agency anxiety. There were worries she might hurt herself, especially if she sustains facial injuries. A staff said, "But no matter how hard we try to persuade her, she doesn't want to quit."

To the surprise of fans and experts alike, Lee entered and won the 7th Annual Women's Amateur Boxing Competition in 2010, and the women's 50-kg category in the 10th KBI National Lifestyle Athletics Boxing Championship in November of that same year.

Her momentum continued throughout 2011, winning the women's 48-kg category in the 47th Seoul Amateur Boxing Match in February, and by RSC (Referee Stopped Contest) in the 7th National Amateur Boxing Championships in March. Lee Seung-bae, head coach of the Korean national boxing team, said Lee "has a very accurate left punch. She is tall and has long arms, a very good body for boxing," while coach Baek Seung-won said she has "the fire and the perfect physique" to become a professional boxer, but added, "She is a bit old (to turn pro now)." She later won the rookie of the year award for Seoul-based boxers.

More wins followed in July 2012 with the women's 48-kg category in the 42nd Seoul Boxing Prematch/Amateur Boxing Federation, and the 33rd President's Cup Amateur Boxing Contest.

In December 2012, she tried out for the first time for the national women's boxing team by competing in the under-48 kg light flyweight category in the National Amateur Boxing Championships, which doubled as the 2013 first national qualifying round. The 28-year-old was the oldest participant at the national championships with a 17 to 34 age limit. But Lee was defeated in the final of the 66th National Amateur Boxing Championships.

In January 2013, she became the goodwill ambassador for the 2014 Asian Games to be held in Incheon. Shortly after, she further showed her serious commitment to the sport by joining the Incheon City boxing team. After moving to Incheon from Seoul to save time for training, Lee underwent surgery for a slipped disk, and suffered from a knee injury, which meant she was unable to maintain her training program.

On April 24, 2013, Lee won the women's 48-kg title at the 24th National Amateur Boxing Championships in a controversial 22-20 decision, making her the country's first mainstream entertainer/celebrity, male or female, to become a national team athlete for any sport.

Lee said that her dream was to represent the country at the 2014 Asian Games, and her ultimate goal to win a medal there. Since her weight class is not included in international competitions such as the Asiad and the Olympics, she upgraded to the heavier under-51 kg class. But Lee was unable to participate in the Asian Games when she failed to enter the March 2014 final tryouts (as well as the two previous ones). Kim Won-chan, manager of the Incheon boxing team, said, "She didn't have enough time to build up her skills for the bout. But we will keep working on her conditioning with the aim of getting her into the 2014 AIBA Women's World Boxing Championships on Jeju Island."

In her second bid to represent Korea at an international multi-sport event, Lee began preparing in 2015 for the first round tryouts for the national boxing team that will compete at the 2016 Summer Olympics in Rio de Janeiro, Brazil. But recurring injuries, notably a dislocated shoulder which made her switch from an orthodox stance to a southpaw stance, led her to announce her retirement from the sport in September 2015.

== Personal life ==
In July 2017, she announced through her social media that she would be getting married in September and was 14 weeks pregnant. She gave birth to the couple's first child, a boy, on January 7, 2018.

On March 17, 2025, her agency, Ace Factory, confirmed the news of the divorce, stating, "They have mutually agreed to part ways and are currently proceeding with the divorce process. As this is a personal matter, we ask for your understanding that we cannot respond to further inquiries."

On July 8, 2025, Lee announced through her official social media account that she is expecting her second child. She also revealed the pregnancy was achieved through IVF. On November 5, 2025, Lee's agency announced that she recently gave birth to her second child, a daughter.

=== Controversy ===
On July 1, 2015, Lee and her then agency J,Wide-Company filed a cyber defamation lawsuit against a reporter who allegedly spread rumors online that Lee had appeared in a sex video which the agency was using to blackmail her, leading to a suicide attempt; Lee and J,Wide-Company denied those rumors and an arrest warrant for the reporter was later issued by the Seoul Central Prosecutors' Office.

== Filmography ==
=== Film ===
| Year | Title | Role | Notes/Ref. |
|---|---|---|---|
| 2009 | Five Senses of Eros | Jung Se-eun | "Believe in the Moment" "The 33rd Man" |
| 2009 | The Righteous Thief | Song Yeon-hwa | |
| 2010 | Sooni, Where Are You? | Jo-yeon | cameo |
| 2011 | Meet the In-Laws | Da-hong | |
| 2011 | Hoodwinked Too! Hood vs. Evil | Red Puckett | animated, Korean dubbing |
| 2011 | Couples | Na-ri | |
| 2013 | How to Use Guys with Secret Tips | Choi Bo-na | |
| 2013 | Killer Toon | Kang Ji-yoon | |
| 2014 | The Divine Move | Bae-kkob | |
| 2019 | No Mercy | Park In-ae | |

=== Television series ===
| Year | Title | Role |
|---|---|---|
| 2008 | Urban Legends Deja Vu 3 | Sun-ah (episode 2) |
| 2008 | The Kingdom of the Winds | Yeon-hwa |
| 2009 | Boys Over Flowers | Oh Min-ji |
| 2009 | Again, My Love | Son Jung-hwa (cameo) |
| 2009 | Loving You a Thousand Times | Hong Yeon-hee |
| 2010 | Becoming a Billionaire | Bu Tae-hee |
| 2010 | Playful Kiss | Yoon Hae-ra |
| 2011 | Poseidon | Lee Soo-yoon |
| 2012 | Wild Romance | Yoo Eun-jae |
| 2014 | Golden Cross | Seo Yi-re |
| 2014 | Righteous Love | Kim Il-ri |
| 2015 | My Beautiful Bride | Cha Yoon-mi |
| 2017 | The Guardians | Jo Soo-ji |
| 2018 | Risky Romance | Joo In-a |
| 2019 | Liver or Die | Lee Hwa-sang |
| 2020 | SF8 | Ji-woo (Episode: "Blink") |
| 2025 | Salon De Holmes | Kong Mi-ri |

=== Web series ===
| Year | Title | Role | Notes | Ref. |
|---|---|---|---|---|
| 2020–2024 | Sweet Home | Seo Yi-kyeong | Season 1–3 | |
| 2022 | Grid | Ghost | | |
| 2022 | The Mentalist | | | |

=== Television shows ===
| Year | Title | Role | Notes | Ref. |
|---|---|---|---|---|
| 2009 | We Got Married Season 1 | Cast member | Paired with Jun Jin (Ep. 42, 45–55) | |
| 2010 | Dalgona | MC | | |
| 2010–2012 | Entertainment Weekly | MC | | |
| 2012 | Music & Lyrics – Season 2 | | Paired with Jay Park | |
| 2016 | Real Men | Cast member | Navy NCO special | |
| 2016–2017 | Baek Jong-won's Top 3 Chef King | MC | Episode 62-89 | |
| 2018 | Those Who Cross the Line | Cast member | Episode 1–16 | |
| 2020 | I'm a Survivor | Cast member | | |
| 2021 | Celebeauty | MC | Season 3 | |
| 2023–2024 | Zombie Verse | Cast Member | Season 1–2 | |

=== Music video appearances ===
| Year | Song Title | Artist |
|---|---|---|
| 2009 | "Hey Ya! " | Jun Jin |
| 2009 | "Awfully" | Beige |
| 2010 | "Always" | Huh Gak |

== Discography ==
=== Singles ===
| Year | Song title | Artist | Album |
|---|---|---|---|
| 2009 | "Like a Fool" | Jun Jin feat. PS Jun & Lee Si-young | Fascination |
| 2009 | "Awfully" | Lee Si-young | digital single |
| 2009 | "Hero" | Lee Si-young | The Righteous Thief OST |
| 2009 | "Just Love" | Lee Si-young | The Righteous Thief OST |
| 2010 | "What Is Love" | Honey Family feat. Gary, Lee Si-young | Resurrection |
| 2010 | "That's My Style" | Honey Family feat. Poppin' Hyun-joon, Lee Si-young, Q☆B | Resurrection |
| 2011 | "When Time Passes" | Lee Si-young | Meet the In-Laws OST |
| 2011 | "Our Love Shines" | Gong Hyung-jin, Kim Joo-hyuk, Lee Si-young, Oh Jung-se, Lee Yoon-ji | Couples OST |

== Ambassadorship ==
- Swiss Tourism Ambassadors' Swiss Friends (2022)

== Awards and nominations ==
| Year | Award | Category | Nominated work | Result | Ref. |
|---|---|---|---|---|---|
| 2009 | Men's Health Cool Guy Contest | Vital Woman Award | —N/a | Won | |
| 2010 | 7th Max Movie Awards | Best New Actress | The Righteous Thief | Won | |
| 2010 | KBS Entertainment Awards | Best Female Newcomer in a Variety Show | Entertainment Weekly | Won | |
| 2010 | KBS Drama Awards | Best New Actress | Becoming a Billionaire | Won | |
| 2010 | KBS Drama Awards | Netizen Award, Actress | Becoming a Billionaire | Nominated | |
| 2011 | 47th Baeksang Arts Awards | Best New Actress | Becoming a Billionaire | Nominated | |
| 2011 | KBS Drama Awards | Excellence Award, Actress in a Miniseries | Poseidon | Nominated | |
| 2011 | KBS Drama Awards | Netizen Award, Actress | Poseidon | Nominated | |
| 2013 | 22nd Buil Film Awards | Best Actress | How to Use Guys with Secret Tips | Nominated | |
| 2014 | KBS Drama Awards | Excellence Award, Actress in a Mid-length Drama | Golden Cross | Nominated | |
| 2014 | KBS Drama Awards | Netizen Award, Actress | Golden Cross | Nominated | |
| 2014 | KBS Drama Awards | Best Couple Award with Kim Kang-woo | Golden Cross | Nominated | |
| 2016 | 1st Asia Artist Awards | Best Choice Award | —N/a | Won | |
| 2016 | MBC Entertainment Awards | Rookie Award, Female in Variety Show | Real Men | Won | |
| 2017 | MBC Drama Awards | Top Excellence Award, Actress in a Monday-Tuesday Drama | The Guardians | Nominated | |
| 2017 | MBC Drama Awards | Best Character Award, Fighting Spirit Acting | The Guardians | Nominated | |
| 2018 | MBC Drama Awards | Top Excellence Award, Actress in a Monday-Tuesday Miniseries | Risky Romance | Nominated | |
| 2019 | KBS Drama Awards | Excellence Award, Actress in a Mid-length Drama | Liver or Die | Won | |
| 2019 | KBS Drama Awards | Netizen Award, Actress | Liver or Die | Nominated | |
| 2019 | KBS Drama Awards | Best Couple Award with Jeon Hye-bin | Liver or Die | Nominated | |
| 2019 | KBS Drama Awards | Best Couple Award with Choi Dae-chul | Liver or Die | Nominated | |
| 2021 | Brand of the Year Awards | Celebrity TikToker | —N/a | Won | |
| 2021 | 3rd Asia Contents Awards | Best Actress | Sweet Home | Nominated | |
| 2021 | Asian Academy Creative Awards 2021 | Best Actress in Leading Role | Sweet Home | Nominated | |

=== Athletic awards ===
| Year | Award | Category | Result |
|---|---|---|---|
| 2010 | 7th Annual Women's Amateur Boxing Competition | —N/a | Won |
| 2010 | 10th KBI National Lifestyle Athletics Boxing Championship | women's 50-kg | Won |
| 2011 | 47th Seoul Amateur Boxing Match | women's 48-kg | Won |
| 2011 | 7th National Amateur Boxing Championships | Referee Stopped Contest | Won |
| 2012 | 42nd Seoul Boxing Prematch Amateur Boxing Federation | women's 48-kg | Won |
| 2012 | 33rd Presidents cup Amateur Boxing Contest | women's 48-kg | Won |
| 2012 | National Amateur Boxing Championships | women's under 48-kg light flyweight | final round |
| 2013 | 24th National Amateur Boxing Championships | women's 48-kg | Won |
