= Puberty Medley =

- Also known as: Adolescence Medley
- Genre: School; Coming-of-age; Romantic-comedy
- Based on: Puberty Medley by Kwak In-geun
- Written by: Kim Bo-yeon
- Directed by: Kim Seong-yoon
- Starring: Kwak Dong-yeon; Lee Se-young; Choi Tae-joon; Kwak Jung-wook; Park Jeong-min; Bae Noo-ri; Yoon Park
- Opening theme: "Stargirl 2013" by Bulldog Mansion
- Country of origin: South Korea
- Original language: Korean
- No. of episodes: 4

Production
- Executive producer: Bae Kyung-soo
- Producer: Baek Sang-hoon
- Production companies: Celltrion Entertainment (formerly Dream E&M); KBS Media Ltd.

Original release
- Network: KBS2
- Release: 10 July – 31 July 2013

Related
- Drama Special Series

Puberty Medley (Korean: 사춘기 메들리; RR: Sachungi medeulli) is a 2013 South Korean television miniseries starring Kwak Dong-yeon, Lee Se-young, Choi Tae-joon, Kwak Jung-wook, Park Jeong-min, Bae Noo-ri and Yoon Park. A coming-of-age teen drama about students at a village high school, it was adapted from the webtoon of the same title written by Kwak In-geun, which was published on Daum WebToon from November 9, 2011 to February 29, 2012. It aired as part of the Drama Special Series anthology on KBS2 from July 10 to July 31, 2013 on Sundays at 23:10 for four episodes.

== Synopsis ==
Choi Jung-woo (Baek Sung-hyun) is a part-timer village high school teacher who is still waiting for the results of the licensure examination for teachers. With his fate in the licensure still undetermined, he works for the meantime in his alma mater, the Namil High School.

Being at Namil High School, Jung-woo is reminded of his adolescent life ten years ago. He also keeps on receiving e-mails from his former classmates and acquaintances. Upon opening in his laptop a gallery of his high school photos, he reminisces his colorful high school life when he was still a teenage boy who unexpectedly gained instant fame in Namil High.

== Episodes ==
=== Episode 1 (Transfer Student) ===
Ten years ago, teenage Choi Jung-woo (Kwak Dong-yeon) is the new student at Namil High School. After transferring schools seven times because of his father's job, Jung-woo has learned to live like an "invisible man" and is determined not to make friends. But Yang Ah-young (Lee Se-young), the smart and seemingly aloof Class President, is actually full of empathy, so she nags him into doing many school chores, which annoys Jung-woo.

Meanwhile, his shy seatmate Im Deok-won (Kwak Jung-wook) is being bullied by senior student Shin Young-bok (Park Jung-min) into doing errands for him. At first, Jung-woo does not want to get involved, but he ends up yelling and throwing a bag of snacks at Young-bok, that unfortunately lands on someone else walking along the corridor. This happens to be the school's toughest student and aspiring boxer Lee Yeok-ho, a.k.a. Brown Bear (Choi Tae-joon), who challenges Jung-woo to a one-on-one fight.

Jung-woo's instant fame heightens when he takes revenge on Ah-young by asking her out. To his shock, Ah-young accepts his offer instead, making their classmates overjoyed and most people at Namil High, including the senior bullies, going ballistic about this new "class couple." When Jung-woo learns that his father will be transferred to Seoul in a few days, he volunteers to join the National Singing Contest which everyone avoids, thinking that he will be in Seoul by the time Yeok-ho hunts him down and the singing contest commences. But his nightmare continues when Jung-woo's father decides not to transfer to Seoul after all and tells his family that they are staying in Namil. Jung-woo has no other choice but to face all his challenges head-on.

=== Episode 2 (It's a Secret) ===
When Jung-woo learns from Deok-won that the bully Young-bok is hunting him down, he escapes at noontime and goes with Ah-young to have their lunch. He learns that the entire village already knew that he is the contender for the National Singing Contest. Jung-woo also receives another threat from Young-bok, making him think of plans on how to overcome the senior bullies. He signs up for a training in the village's boxing gym, but he escapes hastily upon learning that it was the place where Yeok-ho does his training. Later, while walking home together, Ah-young asks Jung-woo why he asked her out. In response, Jung-woo, who is starting to have feelings for her, tells her that it is a secret and kisses her.

Back at school, Ah-young hesitatingly joins her female classmates in playing a paranormal game where they can ask questions to the school ghost. When the paper they used in the game rips upon questioning the "ghost" if Ah-young has found her soulmate (assuming it was Jung-woo), Ah-young's classmates claim that she will be temporarily haunted by this "ghost" later at night. Though unbelieving in the paranormal, Ah-young is scared by the thought of seeing ghosts and enlists Jung-woo's help in illegally breaking into the school at night to get her "notes."

While Jung-woo and Ah-young search inside their classroom, Young-bok and fellow senior Lee Won-il (Yoon Park) plan to take revenge against Jung-woo by putting a box of cigarettes and a bottle of liquor in his desk. Before the bullies arrive, Ah-young finds her notes (which was actually the ripped paper used in the ghost game) and escapes through the window, Jung-woo jumping out first. Young-bok and Won-il arrive at the classroom just in time to see Ah-young jump from the window. Since Ah-young's back was facing them and she was also clad in white, they think it was the school ghost and scream loudly. They arouse the school's security personnel in the process and are caught with the cigarettes and the liquor.

In another walk towards home, Jung-woo sings to Ah-young the song he chose to perform in the National Singing Contest. Though she considers the song to lack emotion, Ah-young is secretly touched and offers Jung-woo her help in the production of his piece. She also requests Jung-woo to sing a song that will surely cheer her up.

=== Episode 3 (Qualifications of a Man) ===
Meanwhile, Yeok-ho meets up with the members of a gang he was previously affiliated with, along with Young-bok and Won-il. Though he can actually handle them all by himself, he rejects in putting up a fight against them, so the gang members beat him up. Won-il, who is bitter towards Yeok-ho, enjoys seeing the fight but Young-bok interferes and tries to help. Deok-won, along with Jung-woo, happens to pass by and helps Yeok-ho, whom he realized was actually kind-hearted despite his rough features. Jung-woo attempts to stop the fight but is threatened by Won-il, who tells him about a secret relationship between Yeok-ho and Ah-young. Dejectedly, he runs away, making him look like a coward.

Ashamed of himself, Jung-woo distances himself from Ah-young but learns that Yeok-ho is actually protecting Ah-young from Wo-nil, who was one of her former suitors. Jung-woo decides, later on, to finally accept Yeok-ho's challenge through a boxing match. They agreed that Jung-woo wins if he is able to strike Yeok-ho down even once.

Meanwhile, the village has suffered heavy rains which caused the river to swell and their bridge to collapse. In the disaster, Young-bok and his younger sister, who were crossing the bridge at night, fall into the rapids. Jung-woo, Deok-won, and Yeok-ho's grandfather luckily arrives at the scene and saves them from getting drowned.

Later, Jung-woo learns that Yeok-ho is orphaned for long and that he trained under Ah-young's older brother, the late Yang Young-woong (Lee Jong-hyun) who died after saving people during a severe flood in Namil years ago. Soon after, Jung-woo faces Yeok-ho for their boxing duel, with Ah-young and their schoolmates watching. After being battered for three rounds, Jung-woo is able to make a decisive punch on Yeok-ho, shocking everyone in the court.

=== Episode 4 (Your Voice Ringing in My Ears) ===
After the boxing match, Jung-woo braces himself for the upcoming National Singing Contest, with the help of Deok-won and his fellow schoolmates as the musicians. Ah-young, who thinks she cannot watch the contest for herself, asks Yeok-ho if he could do it for her.

On the day of the singing contest, Jung-woo's team wins the first prize. Yeok-ho, who was attending another boxing training, arrives late at the venue and finds out the Ah-young had come to watch the contest ahead of him, though both of them were not able to see the performance.

Shortly, Ah-young spends intimate moments with Jung-woo and gives him her guitar and bicycle, both of which were actually precious to her. When Jung-woo gets curious, she reveals to him that she will be transferring out to Seoul, saddening him. A day before she transfers, Ah-young expresses her gratitude for Jung-woo and kisses him. Jung-woo have never met her again since that time.

Upon Ah-young's transfer, Jung-woo is appointed as the new class president. Sincerely missing her, Jung-woo comes upon Ah-young's diary which contains her affection for him which she had actually kept secret all along. In Seoul, Ah-young gets teary-eyed in happiness upon watching Jung-woo's song revealed in a TV replay of the National Singing Contest. The performance cheers everyone in the venue as what Jung-woo had promised to do.

Back to present time, Jung-woo gets emotional and confused upon seeing a number of e-mails he received from Ah-young. The results of the licensure examinations are released and Jung-woo is one of the lucky passers, prompting him to continue his career in Namil High School. On the closing scene of the series, while walking home, Jung-woo hears a woman's voice calling his name. Turning around, he smiles with longing at the familiar woman who called him.

== Cast ==
=== Main ===
- Kwak Dong-yeon as Choi Jung-woo
  - Baek Sung-hyun as adult Choi Jung-woo
  - Kim Kyung-min as middle school student Choi Jung-woo (ep 1)
  - Lee Joon-myung as elementary school student Choi Jung-woo (ep 1)
- Lee Se-young as Yang Ah-young
  - Yoo Da-mi as adult Yang Ah-young (ep 4)
- Kwak Jung-wook as Im Deok-won
- Choi Tae-joon as Lee Yeok-ho
- Park Jeong-min as Shin Young-bok
- Bae Noo-ri as Jang Hyun-jin
- Yoon Park as Lee Won-il

=== Supporting ===
- Jung In-gi as Jung-woo's father
- Go Soo-hee as Jung-woo's mother
- Oh Yoon-hong as Ah-young's mother
- Jung Soo-young as Jung-woo and Ah-young's homeroom teacher
- Go Bo-gyeol as Gou-ri
- Kwon Mina as Yoon Jin-young, Ah-young's friend
- Yoon Joo-sang as Yeok-ho's grandfather and small store owner
- Ahn Ji-hyun as Moon Soo-jung, Ah-young's friend
- Kim Dong-hee as Park Sung-tae, Jung-woo's friend
- Woo Seung-min as Deok-hoon
- Geum Bo as Jung-woo and Ah-young's classmate
- Lee Kyu-in as Jung-woo's elementary school classmate (ep 1)
- Kim Hwan-hee as Young-bok's younger sister (ep 3)
- Song Hae as himself, MC of National Singing Contest (cameo, ep 1, 4)
- Lee Jong-hyun as Yang Young-woong, Ah-young's older brother (cameo, ep 2-3)
- Lee Sung-yeol as student council president (cameo, ep 2)

== Ratings ==
Ep.	Episode title	Broadcast date	Average audience share			
Ep.	Episode title	Broadcast date	TNmS		AGB Nielsen	
Ep.	Episode title	Broadcast date	Nationwide	Seoul	Nationwide	Seoul
1	Transfer Student (전학생; Jeonhaksaeng)	10 July 2013	2.9%	<8.4%	3.3%	<7.8%
2	It's a Secret (비밀이야; Bimiriya)	17 July 2013	2.5%	<8.0%	2.6%	<8.0%
3	Qualifications of a Man (남자의 자격; Namjaui jagyeok)	24 July 2013	2.2%	<8.4%	2.6%	<7.9%
4	Your Voice Ringing in My Ears (귓가에 울리는 그대의 목소리; Gwitgae ullineun geudaeui moksori)	31 July 2013	2.5%	<9.2%	2.1%	<8.0%
Average			2.5%	-	2.7%	-

== Awards and nominations ==
Year	Award	Category	Result
2013	Korea Communications Standards Commission	Good Program of the Month	Won
2013	KBS Drama Awards	Best Drama	Nominated
