= No Mercy (2019 film) =

2019 South Korean action film

- Theatrical release poster
- Hangul: 언니
- RR: Eonni
- MR: Ŏnni
- Directed by: Im Gyeong-taek
- Written by: Kim Min; Im Gyeong-taek
- Produced by: Nam Kwon-woo; Jung Suk-hyun
- Starring: Lee Si-young; Park Se-wan; Lee Joon-hyuk
- Cinematography: Oh Jong-hyun; Nam Jin-a
- Production companies: Joy N Cinema; FilmA Pictures
- Distributed by: JNC Media Group
- Release date: January 1, 2019
- Running time: 93 minutes
- Country: South Korea
- Language: Korean
- Box office: US$1.6 million

No Mercy (Korean: 언니; lit. 'Older Sister') is a 2019 South Korean action film directed by Im Gyeong-taek. Produced by Nam Kwon-woo and Jung Suk-hyun, it features Lee Si-young, Park Se-wan and Lee Joon-hyuk in lead roles. It was released on January 1, 2019.

== Plot ==
In-ae, a former hand-to-hand combat instructor in the Korean Army, works as a female bodyguard. One day she witnesses her autistic sister Eun-hye being raped by a politician. She attacks him and stabs one eye out. For this, however, she has to go to prison for a year and a half.

When In-ae comes out of prison, she is happy to see her Eun-hye again. But Eun-hye is regularly bullied at school and exploited and raped by various people. She does not tell her sister, however. Three classmates force Eun-hye to hook up with older men, take them to a hotel room, leave the door open and then call from the bathroom. This is the signal for three guys to enter come the room and attack and rob the seduced man.

On one occasion, Eun-hye and the boys run into a gangster who wants to sell her after raping her. The gangster scares off the boys and abducts Eun-hye. In-ae worries when her sister fails to come to home. But when she goes to the police, they decline to take action, saying it is too early.

In-ae decides to take action on her own. She learns about the gangster, initially by threatening Eun-hye's classmates. From there, she starts on a ruthless pursuit of Eun-hye's abductors and traffickers.

== Cast ==
- Lee Si-young as Park In-ae
- Park Se-wan as Park Eun-hye
- Lee Joon-hyuk as Han Jung-woo, assistant to Park Young-choon
- Choi Jin-ho as Park Young-choon, politician
- Lee Hyung-chul as Ha Sang-man
- Kim Won-hae as CEO Jung
- Kim Jung-pal as Car repair shop owner (cameo)
- Ahn Se-ha as Loan company employee (cameo)
- Lee Ja-eun as Ha Sang-man's wife (cameo)
- Seol Jung-hwan as Ji-Chul

== Reception ==
The film debuted in seventh place with 62,000 admissions (US$476,000) and 172,000 tickets sold (US$1.38 million) overall.
