= Rented in Finland =

South Korean television program

- Promotional poster
- Genre: Reality
- Starring: Lee Je-hoon; Lee Dong-hwi; Kwak Dong-yeon; Cha Eun-woo
- Country of origin: South Korea
- Original language: Korean
- No. of episodes: 10

Production
- Production location: Finland
- Running time: 75–90 minutes

Original release
- Network: tvN
- Release: December 6, 2024 – February 7, 2025

Rented in Finland (Korean: 핀란드 셋방살이) is a South Korean reality television show starring Lee Je-hoon, Lee Dong-hwi, Kwak Dong-yeon, and Cha Eun-woo. It aired on tvN from December 6, 2024, to February 7, 2025, every Friday at 20:40 (KST).

== Premise ==
The cast members are four self-described "city boys" who are flown to Rovaniemi in the northern Lapland region of Finland, where they rent a car and travel to spend two nights each at four different rental cottages. To understand why Finland has been repeatedly named the happiest country in the world, they must adapt to rural life without modern conveniences like electricity, running water or Wi-Fi, while completing tasks like picking berries, chopping firewood, cooking on an open flame and fetching water from a well.

== Cast ==
- Lee Je-hoon
- Lee Dong-hwi
- Kwak Dong-yeon
- Cha Eun-woo

== Production ==
The show was filmed on location at four different cottages in Kuusamo, Kemijärvi and Luusua with a production crew of over 60 people.

== Reception ==
During the week of December 16 to December 22, the show was the most popular non-drama program on Asia's largest over-the-top media service Viu in Indonesia and Thailand, ranking second in Singapore, Malaysia and Hong Kong.

Ep.	Broadcast date	Nielsen National Cable Ratings		
Ep.	Broadcast date	Nationwide	Viewership (millions)	Overall ranking
1	December 6, 2024	3.320%	0.803	1
2	December 13, 2024	2.761%	0.649	1
3	December 20, 2024	2.888%	0.686	1
4	December 27, 2024	2.545%	0.620	1
5	January 3, 2025	3.019%	0.728	1
6	January 10, 2025	2.391%	0.687	1
7	January 17, 2025	2.181%	0.561	2
8	January 24, 2025	1.679%	0.429	1
9	January 31, 2025	2.115%	0.545	1
10	February 7, 2025	2.016%	0.528	1
