= Just Dance (South Korean TV series) =

2018 South Korean television series

- Promotional poster
- Hangul: 땐뽀걸즈
- Lit.: Dance Sports Girls
- RR: Ttaenppogeoljeu
- MR: Ttaenppogŏljŭ
- Genre: Coming of age; Sports
- Created by: KBS Drama Production
- Written by: Kwon Hye-ji
- Directed by: Park Hyeon-seok
- Starring: Park Se-wan; Jang Dong-yoon
- Country of origin: South Korea
- Original language: Korean
- No. of episodes: 16 (Note: In order to circumvent Korean laws that prevent commercial breaks in the middle of an episode, what would previously have been aired as single 70 minute episodes are now being repackaged as two 35 minute episodes, with two episodes being shown each night with a commercial break between the two.)

Production
- Executive producers: Hwang Eui-kyung; Kim Seong-gon; Lee Jung-hee
- Producers: Ahn Chang-ho; Jung Yeon-ji; Park Seul-gi
- Camera setup: Single-camera
- Running time: 35 minutes
- Production companies: MI Inc.; NK Mulsan Co., Ltd.

Original release
- Network: KBS2
- Release: December 3 – December 25, 2018

Related
- Dance Sports Girls (2017)

Just Dance (Korean: 땐뽀걸즈; RR: Ttaenppogeoljeu) is a South Korean television series starring Park Se-wan and Jang Dong-yoon. It is based on a documentary of the same name which aired on KBS1 in 2017 and was awarded "Best Educational Show" during the 54th Baeksang Arts Awards. Produced by MI Inc. for KBS, it aired on KBS2's Mondays and Tuesdays at 22:00 KST from December 3 to December 25, 2018.

== Synopsis ==
In a Girls' Vocational High School in Geoje, six students dream to win a dancesport competition.

== Cast ==
=== Main ===
- Park Se-wan as Kim Shi-eun
- Jang Dong-yoon as Kwon Seung-chan

=== Supporting ===
==== Dance Sports Club ====
- Lee Joo-young as Park Hye-jin
- Joo Hae-eun as Yang Na-young
- Shin Do-hyun as Lee Ye-ji
- Lee Yoo-mi as Kim Do-yeon
- Kim Su-hyeon as Kim Young-ji
- Moo Hye-in as the dance sports club captain
- Jang Yi-jung as Min-joo
- Hong Seung-hee as Kim Joo-hyun

==== Teachers ====
- Kim Kap-soo as Lee Kyu-ho
- Jang Sung-Bum as Han Dong-hee
- Park Soo-young as the vice principal

==== People around Shi-eun ====
- Kim Sun-young as Park Shi-young (Shi-eun's mother)
- Song Ji-in as Kim Shi-ra (Shi-eun's sister)

==== Others ====
- Jang Hyun-sung as Kwon Dong-seok (Seung-chan's father)
- Lee Chung-mi as (cameo)
- Yeon Jae-hyeong as Lee Tae-sun
- Moon Sook as Hye-jin's grandmother (Ep. 8, 10)
- Son Woo-hyeon

== Production ==
Just Dance reunites Jang Dong-yoon and Park Se-wan who previously worked together in School 2017.

The first script reading was held on September 20, 2018 at KBS Annex Broadcasting Station in Yeouido with the attendance of cast and crew.

== Original soundtrack ==
Just Dance OST

Soundtrack album by Various artists
- Released: 2018
- Genre: Soundtrack
- Languages: Korean; English
- Labels: MI Inc.; In Next Trend; Stone Music; Genie Music

=== Part 1 ===
Released on December 13, 2018
No.	Title	Lyrics	Music	Artist	Length
1.	"Take My Hand"	Ethan	Ethan	Hong Dae-kwang	4:18
2.	"Take My Hand" (Inst.)		Ethan		4:18
Total length:					8:38

=== Part 2 ===
Released on December 17, 2018
No.	Title	Lyrics	Music	Artist	Length
1.	"Remember Me" (기억해 추억해)	Kim Ji-soo, JK	Kim Ji-soo	Kim Ji-sook	3:57
2.	"Remember Me" (Inst.)		Kim Ji-soo		3:57
Total length:					7:54

=== Part 3 ===
Released on December 18, 2018
No.	Title	Lyrics	Music	Artist	Length
1.	"World (Sunshine)" (세상은 (Sunshine))	Kim Bo-kyung, Park Ji-won, Seo Jae-ha, Kim Young-sung	Park Ji-won, Seo Jae-ha, Kim Young-sung	Jo Sung-mo	4:50
2.	"Vamos"	Park Young-ik	Park Young-ik	Berry Good	2:57
3.	"Like It" (좋아)	Seo Ui-beom(277sound)	Seo Ui-beom(277sound)	SBGB	3:02
4.	"World (Sunshine)" (Inst.)		Park Ji-won, Seo Jae-ha, Kim Young-sung		4:50
5.	"Vamos" (Inst.)		Park Young-ik		2:57
6.	"Like It" (Inst.)		Seo Ui-beom(277sound)		3:02
Total length:					20:38

== Ratings ==
- In this table, the blue numbers represent the lowest ratings and the red numbers represent the highest ratings.
- N/A denotes that the rating is not known.

Ep.	Original broadcast date	Average audience share	
Ep.	Original broadcast date	TNmS	AGB Nielsen
Ep.	Original broadcast date	Nationwide	Nationwide
1	December 3, 2018	4.0%	2.7%
2	December 3, 2018	3.8%	3.5%
3	December 4, 2018	3.0%	2.5%
4	December 4, 2018	3.2%	2.9%
5	December 10, 2018	2.0%	1.7%
6	December 10, 2018	1.9%	2.0%
7	December 11, 2018	2.5%	2.3%
8	December 11, 2018	2.9%	2.3%
9	December 17, 2018	2.2%	2.1%
10	December 17, 2018	2.1%	2.2%
11	December 18, 2018	2.5%	1.7%
12	December 18, 2018	2.6%	2.1%
13	December 24, 2018	—N/a	1.9%
14	December 24, 2018	—N/a	2.0%
15	December 25, 2018	—N/a	2.0%
16	December 25, 2018	—N/a	2.5%
Average		— (Note: Due to some ratings not recorded, the exact average rating is unknown.)	2.3%

== Awards and nominations ==
Year	Award	Category	Nominee	Result	Ref.
2018	KBS Drama Awards	Excellence Award, Actor in a One Act/Special/Short Drama	Jang Dong-yoon	Won	
2018	KBS Drama Awards	Best New Actress	Park Se-wan	Won	
2019	55th Baeksang Arts Awards	Best New Actress	Park Se-wan	Nominated	
