= Hwang Kwang-hee =

South Korean singer and actor

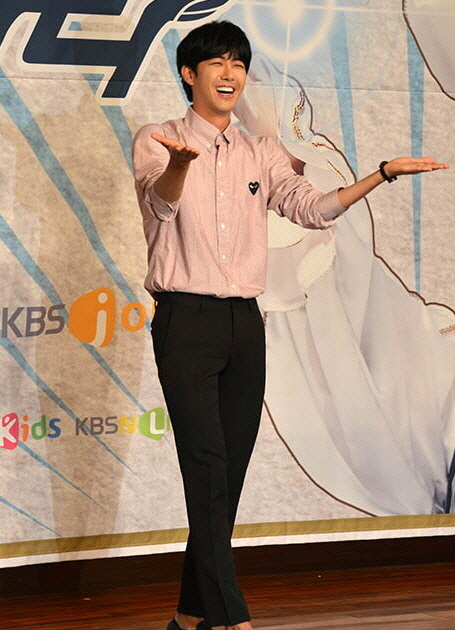
- Hwang in 2015.
- Born: Hwang Kwang-hee; August 25, 1988 (age 38); Paju, South Korea
- Occupations: Singer; TV host; actor; television personality
- Years active: 2010–present
- Agent: Bonboo
- Musical career
- Genre: K-pop
- Instrument: Vocals
- Label: Star Empire
- Member of: ZE:A

Korean name
- Hangul: 황광희
- Hanja: 黃光熙
- RR: Hwang Gwanghui
- MR: Hwang Kwanghŭi

Hwang Kwang-hee (Korean: 황광희; born August 25, 1988), also known mononymously as Kwanghee, is South Korean singer, actor, and TV personality. He debuted in 2010 as a member of the boy band ZE:A. He is also known for his appearances on variety shows and was a cast member on Infinite Challenge from 2015 until he enlisted in the military in 2017.

== Career ==
On May 28, 2011, Hwang attended the "2011 Environment Day" event in Seoul, where he participated in a "clothes layering game" and shocked everyone by putting on 252 layers of t-shirts, earning him a Guinness World Record for the most T-shirts worn. He appeared on We Got Married, on which he was paired with Sunhwa, a member of the group Secret. The last episode was filmed on April 10, 2013.

In April 2015, Hwang joined MBC's Infinite Challenge as a regular cast member. He was selected through the Sixth Man project which was held to fill the empty position after Noh Hong-chul left the program.

On February 7, 2017, Hwang joined Bonboo Entertainment.

Hwang enlisted in the army on March 13, 2017 to fulfill his military duty. He was discharged on December 7, 2018.

In January 2022, Hwang renewed his contract with Bonboo Entertainment.

== Personal life ==
=== Military service ===
Hwang fulfilled his mandatory military service as an active-duty soldier, serving as a military musician in the Ministry of National Defense Military Band Battalion at the Seoul National Cemetery from March 13, 2017, until his discharge on December 7, 2018.

== Discography ==
=== Singles ===
List of collaboration singles with selected chart positions, showing year released and album name
| Title | Year | Peak chart positions | Album |
| Title | Year | KOR | Album |
|---|---|---|---|
| "그대만 보여요" (I Can Only See You) with Kim Ye-won | 2011 | — | Protect the Boss OST |
| "맙소사" (Mapsosa) as HwangTaeJi, with Taeyang and G-Dragon | 2015 | 2 | Yeongdong Highway Music Festival |
| "Your Night" with Gaeko feat. Oh Hyuk | 2016 | 1 | Infinite Challenge Great Legacy |

List of singles as featured artist with selected chart positions, showing year released and album name
| Title | Year | Peak chart positions | Album |
| Title | Year | KOR | Album |
|---|---|---|---|
| "Would you marry me?(너,나,우리)" Jung Yong-hwa feat. Lee Joon, Yoon Doo-joon and Hwang Kwanghee | 2020 | — | Reply Project Vol.1 |
| "여름 안에서"(In Summer) SSAK3 ft. Kwanghee | 2020 | 3 | Non-album single |

== Filmography ==
=== Film ===
| Year | Title | Role | Notes | Ref. |
|---|---|---|---|---|
| 2012 | Marrying The Mafia 5 - Return of the Mafia | Choi Gyu-chul | | |
| 2012 | Ronin Pop | Jang | | |
| 2013 | Gladiators of Rome 3D (2012) | Time | Korean dubbing | |

=== Television series ===
| Year | Title | Role | Notes | Ref. |
|---|---|---|---|---|
| 2010 | Prosecutor Princess | Boy in a club | Cameo (episode 2) | |
| 2010 | Gloria | Trainee | Cameo (episode 11,14) | |
| 2011 | Vampire Idol | Kwang-hee | | |
| 2011 | Detectives in Trouble | Hyun-soo | Cameo (episode 1) | |
| 2012 | Salamander Guru and The Shadows | Job seeker | Cameo (episode 3) | |
| 2012 | My Husband Got a Family | Himself | Cameo (episode 39) | |
| 2012 | Standby | Ha Kwang-hee | Cameo (episode 76–77) | |
| 2012 | To the Beautiful You | Song Jong-min | | |
| 2014 | What Happens to My Family? | Vitamin Salesman | Cameo (episode 2) | |

=== Web series ===
| Year | Title | Role | Notes | Ref. |
|---|---|---|---|---|
| 2021 | So Not Worth It | online buyer | Cameo (episode 6) | |
| 2022 | The Glory | HTN radio host | Cameo | |

=== Television shows ===
| Year | Title | Role | Notes | Ref. |
|---|---|---|---|---|
| 2009 | Office Reality - ZE | | Ep. 1–6 | |
| 2009 | ZE riteonjeu | | Ep. 1–12 | |
| 2011 | Let's Go! Dream Team S2 | Participant | Ep. 86, 95 in Dream Team. Teamed with Min (Miss A) in Ep 86. | |
| 2011 | Law of the Jungle | Cast Member | Ep. 1–28 | |
| 2012 | Star King | Panel | | |
| 2012 | Inkigayo | MC | December 16, 2012 – April 5, 2015 | |
| 2012 | We Got Married S4 | Cast Member | (Ep. 133–166) with Han Sun-hwa (Secret) | |
| 2012 | Law of the Jungle | Cast Member | | |
| 2013 | Son Dambi's Beautiful Days S2 | MC | S2, Ep. 7 onwards | |
| 2013 | Party Mart | | MC | |
| 2013 | Ohlala School 1 | MC | | |
| 2013 | Friends Treating You To Something | MC | with Boom | |
| 2014 | 2014 Idol Star Athletics Championships | Caster | Participated with ZE:A under Team C | |
| 2014 | Fashion King Korea | Participant | Season 2 with Kwak Hyun-joo | |
| 2014 | Olive Show 2014 | MC | | |
| 2014 | The Lord Of The Ratings | MC | | |
| 2014 | In Bed With Boss | MC | Ep. 1–3 | |
| 2014 | Law of the Jungle | Cast Member | (Ep. 100 – 102) /Season 12 - Borneo | |
| 2015 | Vitamin | MC | | |
| 2015 | King of Mask Singer | Judge | Pilot Episode | |
| 2015 | Beauty Bible 2015 S/S | MC co-host | with Kang Hyoni and Jeon Hyo-sung (Ep. 1 – 15) | |
| 2015 | Beauty Bible 2015 F/W | MC co-host | Ep. 1 – 14 | |
| 2015 | The Best Cooking Secrets Season 2015B | MC | Ep. 1 – 131 | |
| 2015 | The Best Cooking Secrets Season 2015C | MC | Ep. 1 – 109 | |
| 2015 | Infinite Challenge | Cast member | Ep. 419 – 424, 427 – 523 (2015–2017) | |
| 2015 | Joy's Go for Youth | MC | | |
| 2015 | The Capables One | Pilot | Special Episode | |
| 2015 | Avatar Chef | MC co-host | Ep. 1 – 12 (with Lee Hwi-jae) | |
| 2015 | Healing Camp, Aren't You Happy | MC co-host | Ep. 205 – 219 (with Kim Je-dong and Seo Jang-hoon) | |
| 2016 | The Best Cooking Secrets Season 2016A | MC | Ep. 1 – Ep. ? (March 23, 2015 – January 27, 2017) | |
| 2016 | K-Star Reform Show | MC | Ep. 1 – Ep. ? | |
| 2016 | Idol Cooking King | Paired | with labelmate Han Hyeri and won 1st place. | |
| 2016 | Battle Trip | Traveler | Ep. 23 – 24 (with San E) | |
| 2018 | Everyone's Kitchen | Cast Member | Pilot episode | |
| 2019–2023 | Weekly Idol | MC | Ep. 388–present (with Eunhyuk) | |
| 2019 | Cool Kids | Co-host | Ep. 10 – 22 | |
| 2019 | Everyone's Kitchen | Absent | Ep. 1 – 11 for episodes 5, 9-10 | |
| 2019 | Quiz on Korea 2019 | MC | | |
| 2020 | Birds of a Feather | Cast member | Ep. 1–17 | |
| 2020 | Career Counseling | MC | Ep. 1–4 (with Haha) | |
| 2020 | Three Idiots | Cast member | Ep. 1–13 (with Yang Se-chan, Lee Sang-yeob | |
| 2020 | Long Life and Things | MC | with Han Hye-jin, Jung Joon-ho and Hong Hyun-hee | |
| 2021 | Any Going to Work! | MC | with Kim Gu-ra and Park Sun-young | |
| 2021 | Beauty & the Beast | Cast Member | Ep. 1–2 | |
| 2021 | Legend Music Class - Lalaland | Cast | | |
| 2021 | Paldo Table Plus | Host | | |
| 2021 | Pet Vitamin | Host | with Park Soo-hong and Tiffany Young | |
| 2021 | Ding Dong Daeng University 2 | Host | | |
| 2021 | Global Donation Show W | MC | | |
| 2021–2022 | Teacher of Narat | Teacher | | |
| 2022 | God and the Battle | Host | | |
| 2022 | The Best Cooking Secret | Host | | |
| 2022 | Sporty Sisters | Special Host | Season 2 | |
| 2022 | Global Donation Show W (Double-U) | Host | | |
| 2022 | Your Literacy+ | Host | | |
| 2023 | Live Well, Fun Equipment | Host | | |

=== Web shows ===
| Year | Title | Role | Notes | Ref. |
|---|---|---|---|---|
| 2021 | Director Kwang | Host | STUDIO WAFFLE | |
| 2021 | Superb Delivery Guys | Host | | |
| 2021–2022 | The King of Nego | Host | Season 1 and 4 | |
| 2022 | Healing | Host | TikTok Stage On Air | |

== Awards and nominations ==
Name of the award ceremony, year presented, category, nominee of the award, and the result of the nomination
| Award ceremony | Year | Category | Nominee / Work | Result | Ref. |
|---|---|---|---|---|---|
| Brand of the Year Awards | 2020 | Entertainer of the year | Hangout with Yoo | Won | |
| MBC Entertainment Awards | 2012 | Best Newcomer in a Show/Variety | We Got Married, Golden Fishery - Kneedrop Guru | Won | |
| MBC Entertainment Awards | 2015 | Achievement award | Hwang Kwang-hee (with Park Myung-su, Jeong Jun-ha, Yoo Jae-suk, Haha); Infinite Challenge | Won | |
| MBC Entertainment Awards | 2020 | Excellence Award in Music/Talk Category (Male) | Hangout with Yoo | Nominated | |
| SBS Entertainment Awards | 2013 | Best Entertainer Award | Star King | Won | |
| SBS Entertainment Awards | 2013 | Best Newcomer Award | Inkigayo | Nominated | |
