= Golden Cross (TV series) =

South Korean television series

- Promotional poster
- Genre: Drama; Revenge; Romance; Thriller
- Created by: Kwak Ki-won; KBS Drama Division
- Written by: Yoo Hyun-mi
- Directed by: Hong Suk-goo; Kim Jong-yeon
- Starring: Kim Kang-woo; Lee Si-young; Um Ki-joon; Han Eun-jung
- Composer: Choi Chul-ho
- Country of origin: South Korea
- Original language: Korean
- No. of episodes: 20

Production
- Executive producer: Lee Gun-joon (KBS)
- Running time: 70 minutes
- Production company: Pan Entertainment

Original release
- Network: KBS2
- Release: April 9 – June 19, 2014

Golden Cross (Korean: 골든 크로스) is a 2014 South Korean television series starring Kim Kang-woo, Lee Si-young, Um Ki-joon, Han Eun-jung, and Jeong Bo-seok. The 20-episode series aired on KBS2 from April 9 to June 19, 2014 on Wednesdays and Thursdays at 22:00.

== Plot ==
A shadowy society known as "Golden Cross" dominates the Korean economy and marketplace with its deep connections and financial power. Prosecutor Kang Do-yoon gets entangled in their dealings when one of their plots gets his beloved sister murdered, and his father is framed for her death. Do-yoon vows revenge on Seo Dong-ha, the powerful man behind the organization, but complications arise when he learns that Seo is the father of the woman he loves, his colleague Seo Yi-re. Yi-re is a righteous and truth-seeking prosecutor; she grew up respecting and obeying her father, and her life is thrown into disarray when she discovers his dark side. Meanwhile, Seo nurtures a protegee, businessman Michael Jang, whose greed and ambition soon makes him challenge his mentor for the top spot. A clash of wills, fortunes, and egos commences.

== Cast ==
=== Main characters ===
- Kim Kang-woo as Kang Do-yoon
- Lee Si-young as Seo Yi-re
- Um Ki-joon as Michael Jang
- Han Eun-jung as Hong Sa-ra
- Jeong Bo-seok as Seo Dong-ha

=== Supporting characters ===
- Lee Dae-yeon as Kang Joo-wan
- Jung Ae-ri as Oh Geum-shil
- Jo Hee-bong as Kang Joo-dong
- Park Byung-eun as Gil Sang-joon
- Choi Woo-seok as Bong Chang-soo
- Lee Joo-seung as Oh Chang-hee
- Kim Min-ji as Kang Ha-yoon
- Lee Ho-jae as Kim Jae-gab
- Lee Ah-hyun as Kim Se-ryung
- Ban Min-jung as Song Jung-soo
- Kim Kyu-chul as Park Hee-seo
- Jo Deok-hyun as Kwak Dae-soo
- Park Won-sang as Im Kyung-jae
- Jo Jae-ryong as Jool-ja
- Kim Jung-heon as Alex
- Jung Won-joong as Kwon Se-il
- Gi Ju-bong as Jung Gyu-jik
- Julien Kang as Evan
- Son Woo-hyuk

== Ratings ==
| Episode # | Original broadcast date | Average audience share | | | |
| Episode # | Original broadcast date | TNmS Ratings | | AGB Nielsen | |
| Episode # | Original broadcast date | Nationwide | Seoul National Capital Area | Nationwide | Seoul National Capital Area |
|---|---|---|---|---|---|
| 1 | 9 April 2014 | 5.0% | 5.2% | 5.7% | 6.1% |
| 2 | 10 April 2014 | 5.2% | 5.3% | 5.0% | 5.4% |
| 3 | 23 April 2014 | 4.7% | 5.0% | 5.3% | 5.7% |
| 4 | 24 April 2014 | 4.9% | 5.2% | 5.1% | 5.9% |
| 5 | 30 April 2014 | 5.4% | 5.7% | 6.6% | 7.6% |
| 6 | 1 May 2014 | 5.9% | 6.4% | 6.1% | 7.0% |
| 7 | 7 May 2014 | 6.9% | 7.1% | 7.2% | 7.6% |
| 8 | 8 May 2014 | 7.2% | 7.4% | 8.0% | 8.0% |
| 9 | 14 May 2014 | 7.3% | 7.7% | 8.0% | 9.0% |
| 10 | 15 May 2014 | 6.9% | 7.6% | 8.0% | 8.8% |
| 11 | 21 May 2014 | 7.1% | 7.6% | 7.6% | 7.8% |
| 12 | 22 May 2014 | 6.8% | 7.2% | 7.6% | 7.9% |
| 13 | 28 May 2014 | 8.7% | 9.5% | 9.2% | 9.7% |
| 14 | 29 May 2014 | 7.7% | 7.9% | 9.2% | 9.7% |
| 15 | 4 June 2014 | 10.8% | 13.1% | 11.3% | 12.6% |
| 16 | 5 June 2014 | 8.7% | 9.2% | 10.1% | 11.5% |
| 17 | 11 June 2014 | 9.2% | 10.6% | 10.7% | 11.8% |
| 18 | 12 June 2014 | 8.6% | 9.6% | 9.1% | 10.1% |
| 19 | 18 June 2014 | 8.1% | 8.6% | 9.2% | 9.7% |
| 20 | 19 June 2014 | 9.5% | 10.1% | 10.1% | 11.0% |
| Average | | 7.2% | 7.8% | 8.0% | 8.6% |

== Awards and nominations ==
| Year | Award | Category | Recipient | Result |
|---|---|---|---|---|
| 2014 | KBS Drama Awards | Excellence Award, Actor in a Mid-length Drama | Kim Kang-woo | Nominated |
| 2014 | KBS Drama Awards | Excellence Award, Actress in a Mid-length Drama | Lee Si-young | Nominated |
| 2014 | KBS Drama Awards | Best Supporting Actress | Han Eun-jung | Won |

== Production ==
Park Si-hoo was originally considered for the role of Michael Jang, but continuing public outrage regarding his sexual assault case in 2013 led KBS to cancel his casting.
