= Never Twice =

2019 South Korean television series

- Promotional poster
- Also known as: No Second Chances
- Hangul: 두 번은 없다
- Lit.: No Second Chance
- RR: Du beoneun eopda
- MR: Tu pŏnŭn ŏpta
- Genre: Comedy; Family; Drama
- Written by: Goo Hyun-sook
- Directed by: Choi Won-suk
- Starring: Youn Yuh-jung; Park Se-wan; Kwak Dong-yeon; Oh Ji-ho; Ye Ji-won; Park Ah-in; Song Won-seok
- Country of origin: South Korea
- Original language: Korean
- No. of episodes: 72 (Note: In order to circumvent Korean laws that prevent commercial breaks in the middle of an episode, what would previously have been aired as single 70 minute episodes are now being repackaged as two 35 minute episodes, with two episodes being shown each night with a commercial break between the two.)

Production
- Camera setup: Single-camera
- Running time: 35 minutes
- Production company: Pan Entertainment
- Budget: ₩10.5 billion

Original release
- Network: MBC TV
- Release: November 2, 2019 – March 7, 2020

Never Twice (Korean: 두 번은 없다; RR: Du beoneun eopda) is a 2019 South Korean television series starring Youn Yuh-jung, Park Se-wan, Kwak Dong-yeon, Oh Ji-ho, Ye Ji-won, Park Ah-in and Song Won-seok. It aired on MBC TV from November 2, 2019 to March 7, 2020.

== Synopsis ==
The series follows the story of the long-term guests at Paradise Inn, located in the heart of Seoul and their relationship with Guseong Hotel owners.

== Cast ==
=== Main ===
- Youn Yuh-jung as Bok Mak-rye, the owner of Paradise Inn.
- Park Se-wan as Geum Park-ha, a pure young woman who lives in room No. 4 of Paradise Inn. She came from a coastal city and bravely moves into the metropolis.
- Kwak Dong-yeon as Na Hae-jun, the heir of a five-star hotel called Guseong Hotel, which is located right across the street from Paradise Inn. He is the head of its strategic planning department.
- Oh Ji-ho as Gam Poong-gi, a man who lives in room No. 5 of Paradise Inn. He has the perfect looks and voice that captures women's heart.
- Ye Ji-won as Bang Eun-ji, a beautiful woman who lives in room No. 6 of Paradise Inn. She looks younger than her age and has an honest personality, but has never properly dated a man.
- Park Ah-in as Na Hae-ri, Wang-sam's granddaughter who is the head of marketing at Guseong Hotel.
- Song Won-seok as Kim Woo-jae, a golf player who lives in room No. 3 of Paradise Inn. He came from Gangwon Province and learned golf on his own.

=== Supporting ===
- Joo Hyun as Choi Geo-bok, an elderly romantic gentleman who has come to Paradise Inn to meet his first love from over 50 years ago, Mak-rye.
- Han Jin-hee as Na Wang-sam, the chairman and founder of Guseong Hotel.
- Park Joon-geum as Do Do-hee, Wang-sam's first daughter-in-law and Hae-ri's mother.
- Hwang Young-hee as On In-suk, Wang-sam's second daughter-in-law and Hae-jun's mother.
- Jung Suk-yong as Choi Man-ho, a bakery chef who is entangled with Guseong Hotel.
- Go Soo-hee as Yang Geum-hee, Man-ho's wife who is a skin care worker at Guseong Hotel.
