= 6/45 (film) =

2022 South Korean comedy film

- Theatrical release poster
- Hangul: 육사오
- RR: Yuksao
- MR: Yuksao
- Directed by: Park Gyu-tae
- Screenplay by: Park Gyu-tae
- Starring: Go Kyung-pyo; Lee Yi-kyung; Eum Moon-suk; Park Se-wan; Kwak Dong-yeon; Lee Soon-won; Kim Min-ho
- Cinematography: Lee Si-yeon
- Edited by: Kim Chang-ju
- Production companies: TPS Company, Sidus
- Distributed by: Cinnamon HC, Sidus
- Release date: August 24, 2022
- Running time: 113 minutes
- Country: South Korea
- Language: Korean
- Box office: $22.3 million

6/45 (Korean: 육사오; RR: Yuksao) is a 2022 South Korean comedy film directed by Park Gyu-tae, starring Go Kyung-pyo, Lee Yi-kyung, Eum Moon-suk, Park Se-wan and Kwak Dong-yeon. The film depicts a comical encounter between South and North Korean soldiers over the 5.7 billion won lottery that crossed the Military Demarcation Line on the wind. It was released on August 24, 2022.

== Cast ==
- Go Kyung-pyo as Sergeant Park Chun-woo

Military police at the South Korean front guard post-GP. He is the first owner of the lottery.

- Lee Yi-kyung as Junior Sergeant Ri Young-ho

A NCO of the North Korean GP.

- Eum Moon-suk as Captain Kang Eun-pyo

South Korean 437th Outpost commander.

- Park Se-wan as 2nd Lieutenant Ri Yeon-hee

Young-ho's younger sister and a junior officer in the North Korean corps in charge of propaganda broadcasts to South Korea.

- Kwak Dong-yeon as Corporal Kim Man-cheol

An observant belonging to the South Korean frontline

- Lee Soon-won as Senior Captain Choi Seung-il

A North Korean political adviser

- Kim Min-ho as Senior Corporal Bang Cheol-jin

A senior North Korean soldier specializing in hacking against South Korea.

- Yoon Byung-hee as Major Kim Gwang-cheol
- Lee Jun-hyeok as Colonel, South Korean battalion commander
- Ryu Seung-soo
- Shin Won-ho as New recruit

== Production ==
Principal photography began on April 20, 2021 and concluded on June 26, 2021.

== Accolades ==
Award	Year	Category	Recipient(s)	Result	Ref.
Baeksang Arts Awards	2023	Best Supporting Actress	Park Se-wan	Won	
Baeksang Arts Awards	2023	Best Screenplay	Park Gyu-tae	Nominated	
Grand Bell Awards	2022	Best New Actress	Park Se-wan	Nominated	
Grand Bell Awards	2022	Best Screenplay	Park Gyu-tae	Nominated	
Grand Bell Awards	2022	New Wave Award	Park Se-wan	Won	
Korean Film Producers Association Award	2022	Special Jury Award	Kim Hyeon-chul	Won	
Buil Film Awards	2023	Best Supporting Actress	Park Se-wan	Nominated	
Buil Film Awards	2023	Best New Actor	Lee Soon-won	Nominated	
Buil Film Awards	2023	Best Screenplay	Park Gyu-tae	Nominated	
