= Go Soo-hee =

South Korean actress (born 1976)

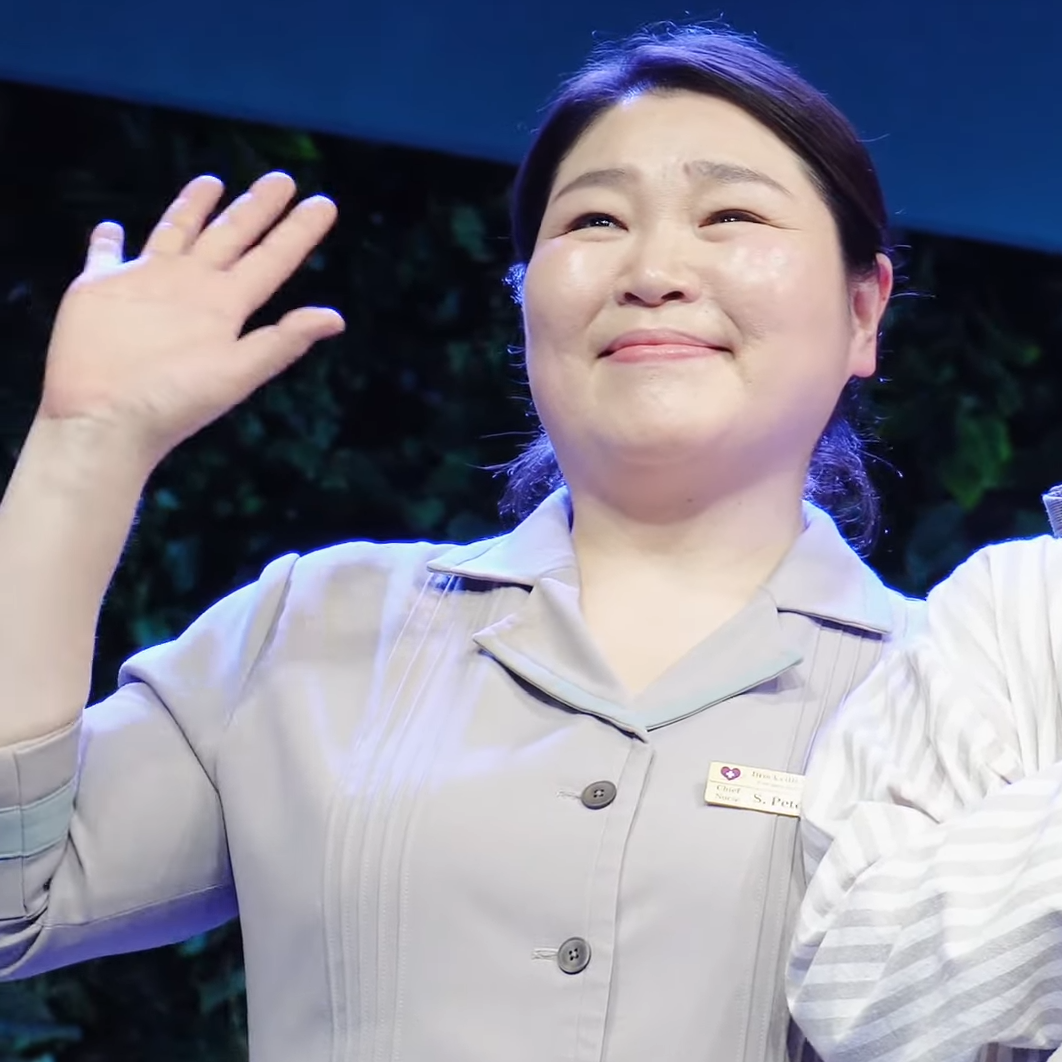
- Go in February 2024
- Born: July 18, 1976 (age 50); Daegu, South Korea
- Education: Daejin University
- Occupation: Actress
- Years active: 1999–present
- Agent: The Queen AMC

Korean name
- Hangul: 고수희
- Hanja: 高水熙
- RR: Go Suhui
- MR: Ko Suhŭi

Go Soo-hee (Korean: 고수희; born July 18, 1976) is a South Korean actress.

== Filmography ==
=== Film ===
Year	English Title	Korean Title	Role
2000	Barking Dogs Never Bite	플란다스의 개	Yoon Jang-mi/Fatso
2001	Amaranth (short film)	아마란스 (야생의 잠)	Obese woman
2002	R U Ready?	아 유 레디?	Big Mom
2002	Four-letter Words	사자성어	Soo-hee
2004	Influenza (short film)	인플루엔자	Woman
2005	The Red Shoes	분홍신	Kim Mi-hee
2005	Sympathy for Lady Vengeance	친절한 금자씨	Ma-nyeo ("Witch")
2005	You Are My Sunshine	너는 내 운명	Hwang Yu-sun
2006	The Host	괴물	Hostage nurse
2006	No Mercy for the Rude	예의없는 것들	Hiccup
2006	Swellfish (short film)	상징적 그녀	Soo-hee
2007	Voice of a Murderer	그놈 목소리	Cha Soo-hee
2007	Beyond the Years	천년학	Yong-taek's wife
2008	Heartbreak Library	그 남자의 책 198쪽	Professor Paeng
2009	The Sword with No Name	불꽃처럼 나비처럼	So-hee
2009	Just Friends? (short film)	친구 사이?	Restaurant owner
2010	Sweet (short film)	맛있는 상상	
2011	Sunny	써니	Kim Jang-mi
2011	Themselves	바다	Soo-hee
2012	Sex, Lies, and Videotape	섹스 거짓말 그리고 비디오 테이프	Sister-in-law
2012	Jade Sorrow (short film)	옥빛 슬픔	
2014	Tazza: The Hidden Card	타짜: 신의 손	Madame Song
2015	Wonderful Nightmare	미쓰 와이프	

=== Television series ===
Year	English Title	Korean Title	Role
1998	I Want to Keep Seeing You	자꾸만 보고 싶네	Han Mi-hyang
2001	Lovers	연인들	
2009	Ja Myung Go	자명고	Mo Yang-hye
2009	No Limit	맨땅에 헤딩	Heo Sook-hee
2010	Golden House	위기일발 풍년빌라	Kim Choo-ja
2010	The Miracle of Love	사랑의 기적	Eun-sook
2012	God of War	무신	Nanjang of Tobang kitchen
2012	Fashion King	패션왕	Employee at Kang Young-gul's factory
2012	Big	빅	Lee Kyung-mi
2012	To the Beautiful You	아름다운 그대에게	Woman in school cafeteria (cameo, episode 2)
2012	Maybe Love	사랑했나봐	
2013	The Queen of Office	직장의 신	Choi Da-sung
2013	Puberty Medley	사춘기 메들리	Choi Jung-woo's mother
2015	Angry Mom	앵그리맘	Han Gong-joo
2015	This Is My Love	사랑하는 은동아	Park Jung-eun (cameo)
2015	Cheer Up!	발칙하게 고고	Choi Hyun-mi
2015	Secret Message	시크릿 메세지	Physiognomist
2016	My Little Baby	마이 리틀 베이비	Kang Yoon-sook
2018	Witch's Love	마녀의 사랑	Jo Aeng-doo
2018	Big Forest	빅 포레스트	
2019	Never Twice	두 번은 없다	Yang Geum-hee
2020	Forest	포레스트	Nurse Kim
2020	Lie After Lie	거짓말의 거짓말	Jung Mi-jin

=== Variety show ===
Year	English Title	Korean Title	Role
2013	Talk Club Actors	토크클럽 배우들	Co-host
2022	Jump Like a Witch	마녀체력 농구부	Cast Member
