= Ji Hyun-woo =

South Korean actor and musician

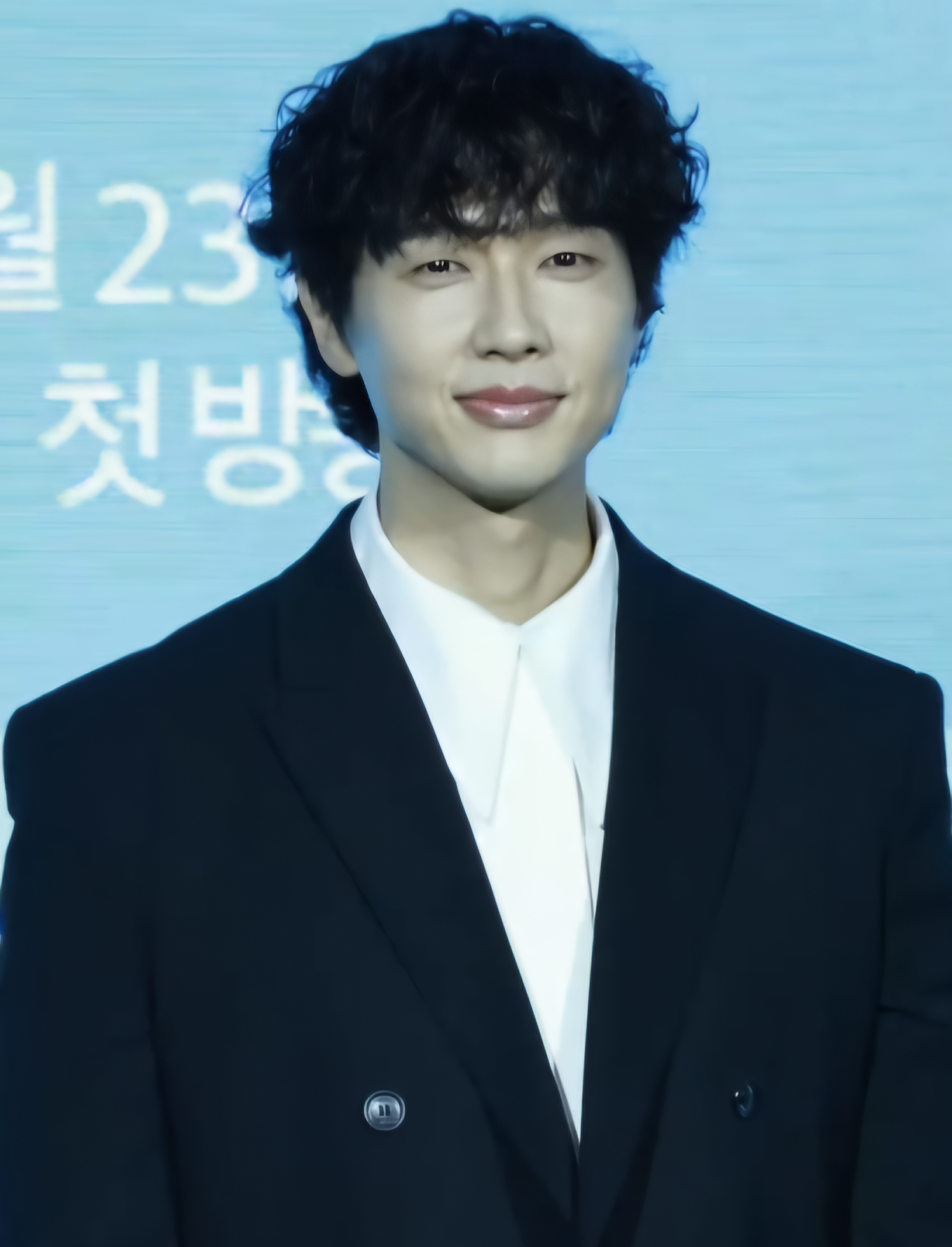
- Ji in March 2024
- Born: Joo Hyung-tae; 29 November 1984 (age 41); Seongdong District, Seoul, South Korea
- Education: Sungkyunkwan University – Performing Arts
- Occupations: Actor; musician
- Years active: 2003–present
- Agent: Lion Heart Entertainment

Korean name
- Hangul: 주형태
- Hanja: 周亨太
- RR: Ju Hyeongtae
- MR: Chu Hyŏngt'ae

Stage name
- Hangul: 지현우
- Hanja: 智鉉寓
- RR: Ji Hyeonu
- MR: Chi Hyŏnu
- Website: instagram.com/official_jihyunwoo

Ji Hyun-woo (Korean: 지현우; born 29 November 1984), birth name Joo Hyung-tae (Korean: 주형태), is a South Korean actor and musician. He was formerly the lead guitarist for Korean indie rock band The Nuts and is best known for his leading roles in the cable TV series Queen and I (2012) and KBS2 weekend drama Young Lady and Gentleman (2021–22).

== Early life ==
Ji Hyun-woo was born in Seong-dong gu, Seoul, the younger of two brothers. His brother, Yoon-chae (윤채), is also a musician; he is a keyboardist and music producer. Ji hyun-woo remembers his childhood was full of practicing guitar, up to eight hours a day while his brother was practicing piano because their father had wished for them become star musicians in the future.

== Career ==
=== 2003–2012: Beginnings and rising popularity ===
Ji Hyun-woo officially made his debut as an actor in 2003. His popularity increased in 2004 with the youth drama You Will Know, and sitcom-turned movie Old Miss Diary. He was named the "Nation's Little Brother" due to his popularity.

Besides acting, Ji is also talented musically. He started as a session guitarist for the second album of Korean band Moonchild. Then in 2004, he along with Park Joon-shik (vocals) and Kim Hyun-joong (bass) formed rock band The Nuts.

In 2005 Ji played Danny Zuko in a Korean staging of the musical Grease, which released its cast recording. He has also contributed to the soundtracks of several of his films and television series. The same year, he became a host of the music program Music Bank.

Ji made his big screen debut in the film Fly High (2006).

Ji continued to star on the small and big screen, among them the TV dramas Golden Apple (2005), Over the Rainbow (2006), Merry Mary (2007), My Sweet Seoul (2008), My Precious You (2008), Invincible Lee Pyung Kang (2009), Becoming a Billionaire (2010), and A Thousand Kisses (2011). He also appeared in the films Attack the Gas Station 2 (2009), and Mr. Idol (2011).

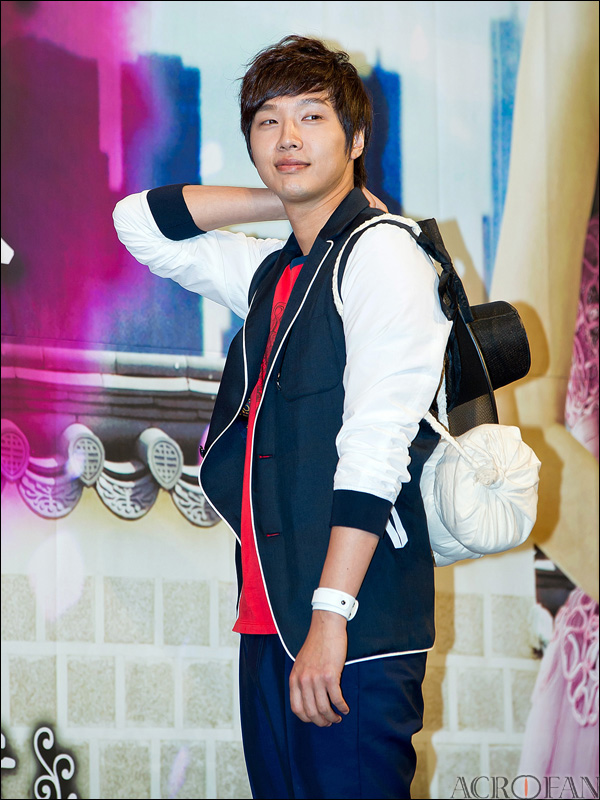
Ji at Queen and I press conference in 2012

In 2011 Ji released his first solo single Crescendo, comprising three songs which Ji wrote and composed, and which was produced by his older brother Ji Hyun-soo who is also a member of rock band N.EX.T.

He was one of the season 2 hosts of Invincible Youth, a variety program based on members of popular girl groups experiencing the rural countryside of Korea.

In 2012, he starred in the fantasy romance Queen and I on cable channel tvN, in which he played a time-traveling Joseon scholar who falls in love with an actress in the 21st century (played by Yoo In-na).

=== 2012–2014: Military service ===
Ji enlisted for his mandatory military service on 7 August 2012, with the Chuncheon 102nd Reserve Forces. He was due to enlist in July but it was delayed for one month while he recovered from a back injury suffered during the filming of Queen and I.

In January 2013, Ji starred in the military musical The Promise. It was co-produced by the Ministry of National Defense and Korea Musical Theatre Association, to commemorate the 60th anniversary of the signing of the armistice. Running from 9 to 20 January at the National Theater of Korea, the musical is centered around a group of soldiers who keeps a promise made to each other during the 6.25 war.

He was discharged on 6 May 2014.

=== 2014–2019: Return to entertainment ===
For his first post-army project, Ji was cast as a genius songwriter/musician who helps the heroine become a trot singer despite his distaste for the musical genre, in the romantic comedy series Lovers of Music. Then in 2015, he played a naive, idealistic homeroom teacher who helps a housewife masquerading as a high school student put an end to school violence in Angry Mom. A major turning point in Ji's career followed as the protagonist of the critically acclaimed cable series Songgot: The Piercer, a webtoon adaptation that tackled social injustice when temps are laid off by a big-box store.

In 2016, Ji signed with Dream Tea Entertainment. He next starred in SBS' thriller Wanted.

In 2017, Ji starred in MBC's weekend drama Bad Thief, Good Thief alongside Seohyun, playing multiple roles in the drama.

In 2018, Ji starred in True Fiction, a black comedy that satirizes politicians. The same year, Ji starred in the medical drama Risky Romance.

In 2019, Ji starred in the romance melodrama Love in Sadness.

In October 2019, Ji Hyun-woo changed his agency from Dream T Entertainment to Lion Heart Entertainment to pursue his musical career as well as his acting career.

=== 2020–present: Pursuing music as well as acting ===
In January 2020, Ji Hyun-woo releases the first mini album of the band 사거리 그오빠(SGO). Ji Hyun-woo is the band's leader, vocalist and guitarist.

After that, he filmed the movie Everglow produced by Myung Film. Everglow was screened at BIFF 2020. In August 2020, he appeared in MBC Every1 drama Lonely enough to love.

During COVID-19 pandemic the band ended their contract with Lion Heart Entertainment. Ji Hyun-woo as an actor still maintains a contract with the agency.

On 10 February 2021, the band SGO's new single album Freesia was released. This single album and even the music video were produced by themselves. In this single, Ji Hyun-woo decided to use his real name, Hyeong-tae, to distinguish between Hyeong-tae who plays music and Hyun-woo, who is an actor.

On 30 April 2021, SGO released their second single 'You Are so beautiful'. On 10 May 2021, SGO started their official YouTube channel and an Instagram account to promote their music all by themselves.

Later in 2021, Ji joined KBS2 weekend drama Young Lady and Gentleman as the main lead. He plays a 40-year-old corporate chairman and a widower with three kids. The series currently ranks at the 4th place among Top 50 series per nationwide viewers in Korea and logged a national average viewership of 36% for its 32nd episode. His performance earned him Grand Prize (Daesang) at 2021 KBS Drama Awards.

In 2022, Ji will release the single "Shake it Boom", which is a song by his band Sageori Geu Oppa (SGO).

== Personal life ==
At the press conference for the last episode of Queen and I on 7 June 2012, Ji made the surprise public declaration: "I wanted to make this confession in front of the fans who enjoyed our drama. I sincerely love Yoo In-na." After days of media frenzy and speculation, the couple were spotted on a date on 17 June 2012. Yoo confirmed their relationship on her radio show on 18 June 2012, saying the two had developed feelings for each other while filming the drama. On 14 May 2014, their respective agencies confirmed in a press release that the couple had broken up.

== Filmography ==
=== Film ===
Year	Title	Role	Ref.
2004	The Hotel Venus	Detective	
2006	Fly High	Kang Min-hyuk	
2006	Old Miss Diary – Movie	PD Ji Hyun-woo	
2009	Attack the Gas Station 2	One Punch	
2011	Mr. Idol	Lee Yoo-jin	
2018	True Fiction	Sun-Tae	
2021	Everglow	Kyung-Hun	

=== Television series ===
Year	Title	Role	Notes	Ref.
2002	School Stories			
2003	Merry Go Round			
2004	You Will Know	Jang Sun-il		
2004	Old Miss Diary	PD Ji Hyun-woo		
2005	Banjun Drama		Episode "My Heart Goes Pit-a-Pat"	
2005	Banjun Drama		Episode "Bad Student"	
2005	Golden Apple	Kyung-min		
2006	Over the Rainbow	Kwon Hyuk-ju		
2007	Merry Mary	Kang Dae-gu		
2008	My Sweet Seoul	Yoon Tae-oh		
2008	My Precious You	Jang Shin-ho		
2009	Invincible Lee Pyung Kang	Woo On-dal		
2010	Becoming a Billionaire	Choi Seok-bong		
2011	A Thousand Kisses	Jang Woo-bin		
2012	Queen and I	Kim Boong-do		
2014	Lovers of Music	Jang Joon-hyun		
2015	Angry Mom	Park No-ah		
2015	Songgot: The Piercer	Lee Soo-in		
2016	Wanted	Cha Seung In		
2017	Bad Thief, Good Thief	Jang Dol-mok / Kim Soo-yeon		
2018	Risky Romance	Han Seung-joo		
2019	Love in Sadness	Seo Jung-won		
2020	Lonely Enough to Love	Cha Kang-woo		
2021	Young Lady and Gentleman	Lee Yong-guk		
2023	Woman in a Veil	Journalist	Cameo (episode 77)	
2024	Beauty and Mr. Romantic	Go Pil-seung	KBS weekend drama	
2025	First Lady	Hyun Min-cheol		

=== Television show ===
Year	Title	Role	Notes	Ref.
2003	요리조리팡팡			
2005	Music Bank	Host		
2008–2009	I Love Movie	Host		
2011–2012	Invincible Youth Season 2	Host		
2022	Hot Singers	Daily audio coach		
2022	With the Silk of Dohpo Flying	Cast Member	with Kim Jong-kook, Noh Sang-hyun, Joo Woo-jae and Hwang Dae-heon	
2023	Big Brother Era	Host		

=== Radio programs ===
Year	Title	Notes	Ref.
2007–2008	Our Happy Days of Youth with Ji Hyun-woo	DJ	
2008–2009	Mr. Radio with Lee Hoon and Ji Hyun-woo	DJ	
2022	Noon's Hope Song, Kim Shin-young	Special DJ	

== Musical theatre ==
Year	Title	Role	Notes	Ref.
2005	Grease	Danny Zuko		
2013	The Promise	Ji-hoon		
2014–2015	Kinky Boots	Charlie Price		

== Discography ==
*Note: the whole list below is referenced.

=== The Nuts ===
Albums

1. The Nuts (2004)
2. Whispers of Love (2006)
3. Could've Been (2008)
4. Crazy Love (2008)
5. Truth J (2009)

Singles

1. 추억여행 "Travel Memories" (2007)
2. 졸업여행 "Graduation Trip" (2008)
3. 바다에 입맞춤 "Kissing in the Sea" (2009)

Compilation

1. 2008 Ivy Mega Mix Single Collection Vol.1

=== Solo artist ===
Cast recording

1. Grease (musical, 2005)

Soundtrack

1. Ji Hyun-woo's Love Letter (From "Over the Rainbow" OST, 2006)
  1. 외눈박이 물고기 "One Eyed Fish"
  2. 애인을 구합니다
2. 눈물의 크리스마스 "Christmas Tears" (duet with Park Joon-shik, from Old Miss Diary – Movie OST, 2006)
3. "One&One" (from Merry Mary OST, 2007)
4. 달콤한 나의 도시 "My Sweet City" (from My Sweet Seoul OST, 2008)
5. 본능적으로 "Instinctively" (from tvN Show Show Show Part 1, 2011)
6. 하루종일 "All Day" (from Lovers of Music OST, 2014)
7. 나는 행복한 사람 I'm a Happy Person (from "Bad Thief, Good Thief" OST, 2017)
8. "Please Don't Go" (From "Lonely Enough to Love" OST, 2020)

Singles

1. Crescendo (2011)
  1. 아기 코끼리 "Baby Elephant"
  2. 좋은 중독 "Good Addiction"
  3. 아이야 "Kid"

=== SGO (사거리 그오빠) ===
Mini album

1. News (2020)
  1. Make up "화장"
  2. Waiting for you "누가 나 좀"
  3. Lie "거짓말"
  4. La Ventana "창문"

Single

1. Freesia (2021)
  1. Freesia
  2. Freesia (Inst.)

Single

1. You Are So beautiful (2021)
  1. You Are So beautiful
  2. You Are so beautiful (Inst.)

Mini Album

1. Love Line (2022)
  1. Shake it Boom
  2. You are so Beautiful
  3. Tic Tic Tic
  4. Freesia
  5. Love Line

Single Album

1. Walk Today (2023)
  1. Walk Today
  2. Sunshine

Single

1. How Are You (2023)
  1. How Are You

== Awards and nominations ==
Year presented, name of the award ceremony, award category, nominated work and the result of the nomination
Year	Award	Category	Nominated work	Result	Ref.
2005	KBS Entertainment Awards	Netizen Popularity Award	Old Miss Diary	Won	
2006	MBC Drama Awards	PD Award	Over the Rainbow	Won	
2007	Korean Entertainment and Arts Awards	Best Male Radio Host	Our Happy Days of Youth	Won	
2007	MBC Drama Awards	Best Couple Award with Lee Ha-na	Merry Mary	Nominated	
2008	SBS Drama Awards	Excellence Award, Actor in a Drama Special	My Sweet Seoul	Nominated	
2008	SBS Drama Awards	Best Couple Award with Choi Kang-hee	My Sweet Seoul	Nominated	
2008	SBS Drama Awards	New Star Award	My Sweet Seoul	Won	
2008	KBS Drama Awards	Excellence Award, Actor in a Serial Drama	My Precious You	Nominated	
2009	KBS Drama Awards	Excellence Award, Actor in a Miniseries	Invincible Lee Pyung Kang	Nominated	
2010	KBS Drama Awards	Excellence Award, Actor in a Mid-length Drama	Becoming a Billionaire	Nominated	
2011	MBC Drama Awards	Excellence Award, Actor in a Serial Drama	A Thousand Kisses	Won	
2014	APAN Star Awards	Best Dressed	—N/a	Won	
2015	Korea Lifestyle Awards	Best Style	—N/a	Won	
2015	JTBC Life Awards	Best Actor	Songgot: The Piercer	Won	
2017	MBC Drama Awards	Top Excellence Award, Actor in a Weekend Drama	Bad Thief, Good Thief	Nominated	
2018	MBC Drama Awards	Top Excellence Award, Actor in a Monday-Tuesday Miniseries	Risky Romance	Nominated	
2019	MBC Drama Awards	Top Excellence Award, Actor in a Weekend/Daily Drama	Love in Sadness	Nominated	
2021	KBS Drama Awards	Grand Prize (Daesang)	Young Lady and Gentleman	Won	
2021	KBS Drama Awards	Top Excellence Award, Actor	Young Lady and Gentleman	Nominated	
2021	KBS Drama Awards	Excellence Award, Actor in a Serial Drama	Young Lady and Gentleman	Nominated	
2021	KBS Drama Awards	Best Couple Award with Lee Se-hee	Young Lady and Gentleman	Won	
2022	APAN Star Awards	Top Excellence Award, Actor in a Serial Drama	Young Lady and Gentleman	Nominated	
2024	APAN Star Awards	Top Excellence Award, Actor in a Serial Drama	Beauty and Mr. Romantic	Won	
2024	KBS Drama Awards	Top Excellence Award, Actor	Beauty and Mr. Romantic	Won	
2024	KBS Drama Awards	Best Couple Award with Im Soo-hyang	Beauty and Mr. Romantic	Won	
2024	KBS Drama Awards	Grand Prize (Daesang)	Beauty and Mr. Romantic	Nominated	
2024	KBS Drama Awards	Popularity Award, Actor	Beauty and Mr. Romantic	Nominated	
