= Becoming a Billionaire =

- Also known as: Birth of the Rich; Birth of a Rich Man
- Genre: Comedy; Romance
- Written by: Choi Min-ki
- Directed by: Lee Jin-seo
- Starring: Ji Hyun-woo; Lee Bo-young; Lee Si-young; Namkoong Min
- Country of origin: South Korea
- Original language: Korean
- No. of episodes: 20

Production
- Producer: Lee Han-ho
- Production locations: Seoul, South Korea
- Running time: 60 minutes Mondays and Tuesdays at 21:55 (KST)
- Production company: Da.da Creative Group

Original release
- Network: KBS2
- Release: March 1 – May 4, 2010

Becoming a Billionaire (Korean: 부자의 탄생; Hanja: 富者의 誕生; RR: Bujaui tansaeng; lit. Birth of a Rich Person) is a 2010 South Korean television series starring Ji Hyun-woo, Lee Bo-young, Lee Si-young and Namkoong Min. It aired on KBS2 from March 1 to May 4, 2010, on Mondays and Tuesdays at 21:55 for 20 episodes.

== Plot ==
Choi Seok-bong believes he is the son of a billionaire that had a one-night stand with his mother. While working as a bellboy at a luxury hotel, Seok-bong practices the qualities he thinks a billionaire's heir would have; all these efforts are for the day he meets his birth father. But one day, Seok-bong is diagnosed with breast cancer, which only has a 50 percent survival rate. Seok-bong doesn't have enough money for treatments, and finds it absolutely ridiculous that a billionaire's heir would die because he has no money. Finding his biological father may be Seok-bong's only hope, so he turns to Lee Shin-mi, the heiress of Ohsung Group and a notorious penny-pincher, for help.

== Cast ==
=== Main characters ===
- Ji Hyun-woo as Choi Seok-bong
  - Park Gun-woo as teenage Choi Seok-bong

A bell boy at Ohsung Hotel in the first few episodes.

- Lee Bo-young as Lee Shin-mi
  - Kim So-hyun as young Lee Shin-mi

The heiress of Ohsung Group, and a strict and frugal person. Ohsung Hotel director in the first few episodes.

- Namkoong Min as Chu Woon-seok

An ambitious man whose goal is to revive his father's company, Frontier Group, and who is interested in Shin-mi. Near the end of the drama, he silently declares his love for Tae-hee when she visits him in prison.

- Lee Si-young as Bu Tae-hee

A spoiled heiress of Buho Group who is interested in Woon-seok. / Bu Tae-hee's mother (ep. 11, cameo)

=== Supporting characters ===
The CEO's

- Yoon Joo-sang as Lee Jung-hyun

CEO of Ohsung Group, father of Shin-mi

- Kim Eung-soo as Bu Gwi-ho

CEO of Buho Group, father of Tae-hee

- Park Young-ji as Chu Young-dal

CEO of Frontier Group, father of Woon-seok

Extended cast

- Shin Da-eun as Han So-jung

Shin-mi's secretary

- Kim Dong-gyun as Mr. Yoo

Employee of Ohsung who works as a spy for Woon-seok.

- Jung Joo-eun as Yoon Mal-ja

Tae-hee's secretary

- Kim Ki-bang as Park Kang-woo

Seok-bong's best friend

- Park Min-ji as Park Kang-sook

Kang-woo's sister

- Ok Ji-young as Bang Soo-jin

Weekly magazine reporter

- Sung Ji-ru as Woo Byung-doo

A homeless wanderer with an interest in molybdenum, Seok-bong's irksome acquaintance, uninvited roommate, and later, business partner.

- Jang Yoo-joon as Woo Bung-eo

Byung-doo's son who is musically talented.

- Kim Mi-kyung as Kang-woo's mother
- Jung Han-yong as Kang-woo's father
- Min Wook as Ha Joon-tae
  - Son Ho-young as young adult Ha Joon-tae

The ailing owner of the license to the mining rights of a molybdenum mine.

- Park Chul-min as Kim Dal-soo

Hotel captain at Ohsung Hotel, and later Lee Jung-hyun's butler

Cameos

- Son Ho-young as Seok-bong's father
- Lee Won-jong as Seok-bong's middle school math teacher
- Choi Song-hyun as Seok-bong's mother when she met Ha Joon-tae
- Jang Tae-sung as Ohsung Hotel bellman
- Lee Han-wi as Teriah Park

== Ratings ==
Episode #	Original broadcast date	Average audience share			
Episode #	Original broadcast date	TNmS Ratings		AGB Nielsen	
Episode #	Original broadcast date	Nationwide	Seoul National Capital Area	Nationwide	Seoul National Capital Area
1	1 March 2010	12.1%	11.9%	12.2%	12.8%
2	2 March 2010	11.8%	11.6%	11.6%	12.3%
3	8 March 2010	11.4%	11.0%	12.2%	11.1%
4	9 March 2010	13.1%	12.8%	12.6%	12.2%
5	15 March 2010	16.2%	16.1%	15.0%	14.5%
6	16 March 2010	17.7%	18.0%	17.0%	17.9%
7	22 March 2010	15.5%	15.7%	14.9%	15.5%
8	23 March 2010	15.2%	14.9%	15.7%	16.2%
9	29 March 2010	15.6%	15.2%	15.6%	16.6%
10	30 March 2010	16.0%	16.2%	15.9%	16.8%
11	5 April 2010	16.2%	15.8%	15.1%	15.1%
12	6 April 2010	17.7%	17.8%	16.2%	16.6%
13	12 April 2010	16.5%	16.2%	13.5%	13.3%
14	13 April 2010	16.7%	16.9%	14.4%	14.5%
15	19 April 2010	16.6%	16.6%	14.8%	15.1%
16	20 April 2010	14.9%	14.6%	14.2%	14.2%
17	26 April 2010	14.2%	14.0%	14.3%	14.0%
18	27 April 2010	13.1%	13.0%	13.0%	12.7%
19	3 May 2010	14.2%	14.3%	13.3%	13.0%
20	4 May 2010	16.6%	17.0%	15.5%	15.3%
Average		15.1%	15.0%	14.3%	14.5%

== International broadcast ==
Its Japanese broadcasting rights were sold to NHK (along with another KBS drama The Great Merchant) for US$3 million. It also aired on Fuji TV as part of the network's "Hallyu Alpha Summer Festival," and on cable channel KNTV beginning July 2, 2014.

It aired in Thailand on Workpoint TV from March 10, 2014, to April 4, 2014.
