= Park Se-wan =

South Korean actress (born 1994)

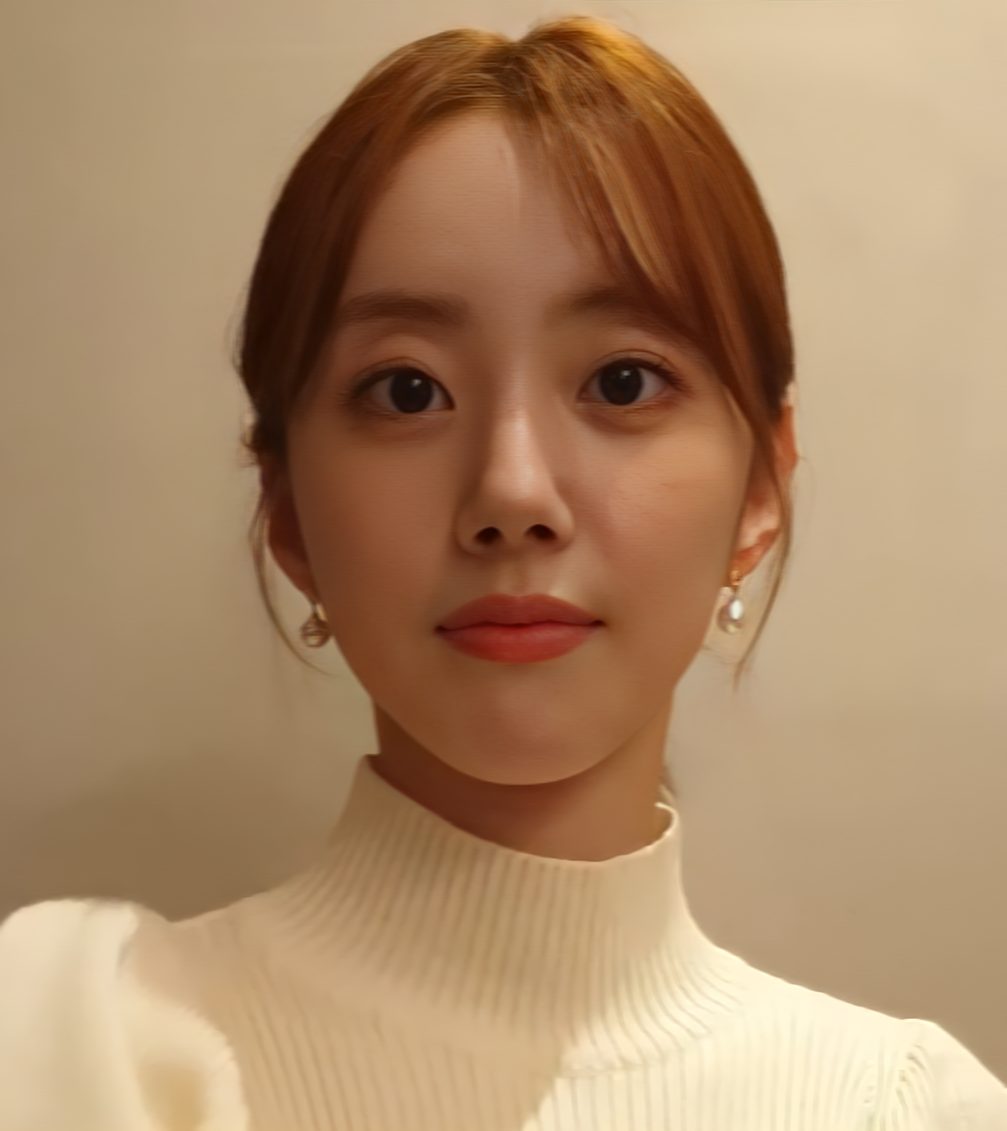
- Park in 2022
- Born: September 24, 1994 (age 31); Busan, South Korea
- Education: Sungkyunkwan University - Department of Acting for Theatre, Film & TV
- Occupation: Actress
- Years active: 2016–present
- Agent: Artist Company

Korean name
- Hangul: 박세완
- Hanja: 朴世完
- RR: Bak Sewan
- MR: Pak Sewan

Park Se-wan (Korean: 박세완; born September 24, 1994) is a South Korean actress.

== Career ==
In 2016, Park made her television acting debut in KBS2's short drama special The Red Teacher. She started gaining more attention in 2017 with her supporting roles in the coming-of-age series School 2017 and the romantic comedy drama I'm Not a Robot.

In December 2018, Park starred in the youth drama Just Dance, based on the documentary of the same name, alongside Jang Dong-yoon with whom she appeared in School 2017. It was her first lead role.

In 2019, she was cast in the fantasy drama Joseon Survival Period and in the drama Never Twice.

== Filmography ==
=== Film ===
| Year | Title | Role | Ref. |
|---|---|---|---|
| 2016 | Midsummer | Eun-hye | |
| 2016 | Fente | Uncredited | |
| 2018 | Omok Girl | Lee Ba-duk | |
| 2019 | No Mercy | Park Eun-hye | |
| 2020 | Collectors | Hye-ri | |
| 2022 | 6/45 | Yeon-hee | |
| 2022 | Life Is Beautiful | Oh Se-yeon (young) | |
| 2024 | Victory | Mina | |

=== Television series ===
| Year | Title | Role | Ref. |
|---|---|---|---|
| 2016 | KBS Drama Special: "The Red Teacher" | Sook-hee | |
| 2016 | Guardian: The Lonely and Great God | Ghost of a student | |
| 2017 | Radiant Office | Lee Kkot-bi | |
| 2017 | School 2017 | Oh Sa-rang | |
| 2017 | KBS Drama Special: "Madame Jung's One Last Week" | Madame Jung (young) | |
| 2017–2018 | I'm Not a Robot | "Pi" Angela Jin | |
| 2018 | Marry Me Now | Yeon Da-yeon | |
| 2018 | KBS Drama Special: "Too Bright Outside for Love" | Kim Yang-hee (young) | |
| 2018 | Just Dance | Kim Si-eun | |
| 2019 | Joseon Survival Period | Han Seul-gi | |
| 2019–2020 | Never Twice | Geum Park-ha | |
| 2021 | Drama Stage: "Lucky" | Lee Yeong-hee | |
| 2024 | Seoul Busters | Seo Min-seo | |

=== Web series ===
| Year | Title | Role | Notes | Ref. |
|---|---|---|---|---|
| 2021 | So Not Worth It | Se-wan | | |
| 2022 | Alice, the Ultimate Weapon | Gyeo-ul | | |
| 2023 | One Day Off | young Park Ha-kyung | Cameo | |
| 2023 | Doona! | Choi I-ra | | |

== Awards and nominations ==
Name of the award ceremony, year presented, category, nominee(s) of the award, and the result of the nomination
| Award ceremony | Year | Category | Nominee(s) / Work(s) | Result | Ref. |
|---|---|---|---|---|---|
| Baeksang Arts Awards | 2019 | Best New Actress – Television | Just Dance | Nominated | |
| Baeksang Arts Awards | 2023 | Best Supporting Actress – Film | 6/45 | Won | |
| Buil Film Awards | 2023 | Best Supporting Actress | 6/45 | Nominated | |
| Grand Bell Awards | 2022 | New Wave Award | 6/45 | Won | |
| Grand Bell Awards | 2022 | Best New Actress | 6/45 | Nominated | |
| KBS Drama Awards | 2018 | Best New Actress | Marry Me Now, and Just Dance | Won | |
| KBS Drama Awards | 2018 | Best Actress in a One-Act/Special/Short Drama | Drama Special – "Too Bright Outside for Love" | Nominated | |
| Korea Drama Awards | 2018 | Best New Actress | Marry Me Now | Nominated | |
| MBC Drama Awards | 2019 | Excellence Award, Actress in a Weekend Drama | Never Twice | Won | |
