= Yoon Joo-sang =

South Korean actor (born 1949)

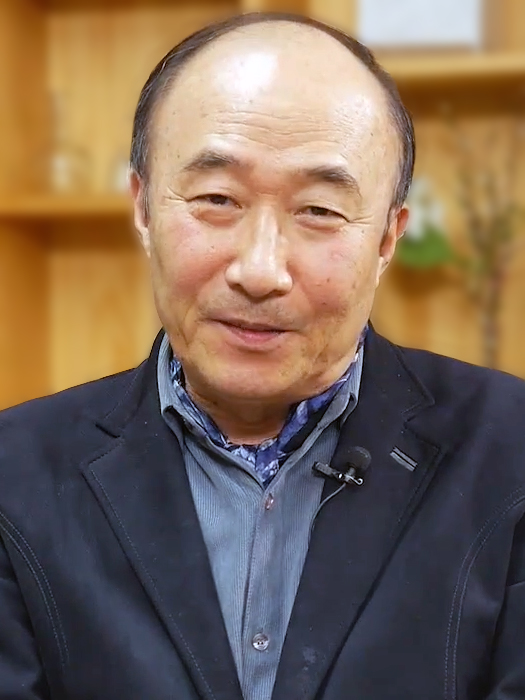
- Yoon in December 2016
- Born: June 25, 1949 (age 77); Yangpyeong County, Gyeonggi Province, South Korea
- Education: Seorabeol Arts University - Theater and Film
- Occupation: Actor
- Years active: 1970–present

Korean name
- Hangul: 윤주상
- Hanja: 尹柱相
- RR: Yun Jusang
- MR: Yun Chusang

Yoon Joo-sang (Korean: 윤주상; born June 25, 1949) is a South Korean actor. In 2009, he won the Best Supporting Actor award during the 2009 KBS Drama Awards for his role in Iris.

== Filmography ==
=== Film ===
- Cane (Hoichori) (2011)
- Miss Gold Digger (2007)
- Happy Killing (2007)
- Radio Star (2006)
- King and the Clown (2005)
- Diary of June (2005)
- Duelist (2005)
- Thomas Ahn Jung-geun (2004)
- Spider Forest (2004)
- The President's Barber (2004)
- Arahan (2004)
- The Circle (2003)
- Natural City (2003)
- No Comment (2002)
- Amygdala (2002)
- This Is Law (2001)
- Guns & Talks (2001)
- Dream of a Warrior (2001)
- General Hospital the Movie: A Thousand Days (2000)
- Phantom: The Submarine (1999)
- The Ring Virus (1999)
- Shiri (1999)
- The Happenings (1998)
- Bitter and Sweet (1995)
- The Taebaek Mountains (1994)

=== Television series ===
- Our Golden Days (2025)
- Mental Coach Jegal (2022)
- Extraordinary Attorney Woo (2022) (cameo, ep. 2)
- Move to Heaven (2021) (cameo, ep. 8)
- Revolutionary Sisters (2021)
- Hello, Me! (2021)
- The Uncanny Counter (2020)
- Memorials (2020)
- 365: Repeat the Year (2020)
- Doctor John (2019)
- Hide and Seek (2018)
- Your House Helper (2018)
- Radio Romance (2018)
- The Secret of My Love (2017–2018)
- Live Up to Your Name (2017)
- Second to Last Love (2016)
- The Good Wife (2016)
- High Society (2015)
- My Unfortunate Boyfriend (2015)
- Exo Next Door (2015)
- Drama Festival: "4teen" (2014) (cameo)
- Tears of Heaven (2014)
- Lovers of Music (2014)
- KBS Drama Special: "The Reason I'm Getting Married" (2014)
- Emergency Couple (2014) (cameo, ep. 1)
- One Warm Word (2013)
- Drama Special Series: "Puberty Medley" (2013)
- I Can Hear Your Voice (2013)
- Iris II: New Generation (2013)
- School 2013 (2012–2013)
- The King of Dramas (2012–2013)
- Arang and the Magistrate (2012)
- Big (2012)
- I Do, I Do (2012)
- Can't Live Without You (2012)
- The Wedding Scheme (tvN, 2012)
- Korean Peninsula (2012)
- Padam Padam (2011–2012)
- KBS Drama Special: "Sorry I'm Late" (2011)
- Ojakgyo Family (2011)
- Baby Faced Beauty (2011)
- Sign (2011) (cameo)
- Drama Special Series: "Special Crime Squad MSS" (2011)
- Smile, Mom (2010–2011)
- KBS Drama Special: "Family Secrets" (2010)
- Big Thing (2010)
- Kim Su-ro, The Iron King (2010)
- Becoming a Billionaire (2010)
- Iris (2009)
- Smile, You (2009–2010)
- The Accidental Couple (2009)
- My Too Perfect Sons (2009)
- Ja Myung Go (2009)
- Star's Lover (2008–2009)
- Drama City: "Love Hunt, Thirty Minus Three" (2008)
- Painter of the Wind (2008)
- Matchmaker's Lover (2008)
- Working Mom (2008)
- Lawyers of the Great Republic of Korea (2008)
- Women in the Sun (2008)
- Who Are You? (2008)
- Lobbyist (2007)
- Auction House (2007)
- Drama City: "Sky Lovers" (2007)
- MBC Best Theater: "Red Dream" (MBC, 2007)
- Daughters-in-Law (2007–2008)
- Kimchi Cheese Smile (2007)
- Capital Scandal (2007)
- Drama City: "Crazy Love" (2007)
- Air City (2007)
- MBC Best Theater: "There is Soup" (2006)
- Korea Secret Agency (2006)
- The Invisible Man (2006)
- MBC Best Theater: "Hello Angel" (2006)
- Drama City: "San-sa's Morning" (2005)
- Sweet Spy (2005–2006)
- Drama City: "Accompany" (2004)
- Drama City: "A Flower at the Tip of the Knife" (2004)
- Drama City: "Our Ham" (2004)
- Jang Gil-san (2004)
- My 19 Year Old Sister-in-Law (2004)
- Desert Spring (2003)
- King's Woman (2003–2004)
- Love Letter (2003)
- Do You Know The Country? (2002)
- Saxophone and Chapssaltteok (2002)
- Empress Myeongseong (2001–2002)
- Life is Beautiful (2001)
- Medical Center (2000–2001)
- Eyes of Dawn (1991–1992)
- Joseon White Porcelain Maria Statue (1988)
- Sunday Mystery Theater: "And There Was No One" (1987)

=== Variety show ===
- Legend of Doctors (jTBC, 2013)
- 9 to 6 (MBC Every 1, 2013)
- Gil, I Want To Go There (YTN, 2013)
- Mystery Theater: Dangerous Invitation (Gyeongin Broadcasting, 2001)

== Theater ==
- A Personal History of Bong Dal-soo (2012)
- Song of the Imperial Palace (2010)
- Educating Rita (1991, 2009)
- True West
- The Brothers Karamazov
- Duet
- Antigone
- Desire Under the Elms
- Death of a Salesman
- The Merchant of Venice
- As You Like It
- Chilsanri
- Cabaret
- The Great Wall of China

== Awards ==
- 2021 KBS Drama Awards: Excellence Award, Actor in a Serial Drama (Revolutionary Sisters)
- 2009 KBS Drama Awards: Best Supporting Actor (Iris)
- 1998 22nd Seoul Performing Arts Festival: Best Actor
- 1997 33rd Baeksang Arts Awards: Best Theatre Actor
- 1995 Year in Theater: Top Excellence Award, Actor
- 1991 15th Seoul Performing Arts Festival: Best Actor
- 1990 연극인상
- 1987 5th Lee Hae-rang Prize for Theater
- 1987 23rd Dong-A Theatre Awards: Best Actor (The Great Wall of China)
- 1987 극평가그룹상: Best Actor
- 1985 21st Dong-A Theatre Awards: Best Actor (True West)
