= Lee Re =

South Korean actress (born 2006)

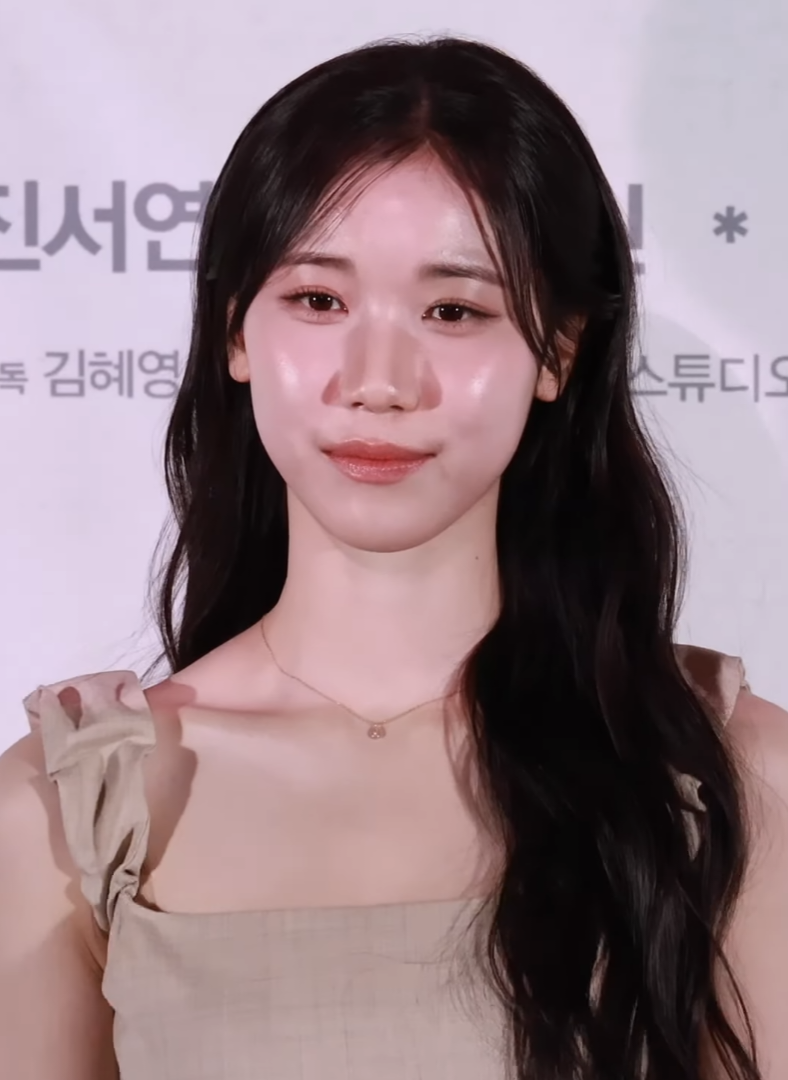
- Lee in February 2025
- Born: March 12, 2006 (age 20); Gwangsan District, Gwangju, South Korea
- Education: Chung-Ang University (Theater and Film)
- Alma mater: Korea International Christian School (KICS)
- Occupation: Actress
- Years active: 2012–present
- Agent: Noon Company

Korean name
- Hangul: 이레
- RR: I Re
- MR: I Re

Lee Re (Korean: 이레; born March 12, 2006) is a South Korean actress. She is best known for playing the title character in Hope (2013), Witch at Court (2017) and Castaway Diva (2023).

== Early life and education ==
Born in 2006, Lee has an older brother and an older sister. She attended Sunchang Elementary School in Gwangju, Gahyeon Elementary School in Incheon and Changchon Elementary School in Seoul. She also studied at Korea International Christian School (KICS) in Incheon, which is a private alternative school for Protestants. She entered the Department of Theater and Film at Chung-Ang University at 16 in 2023, matriculating two years earlier than the norm.

== Career ==
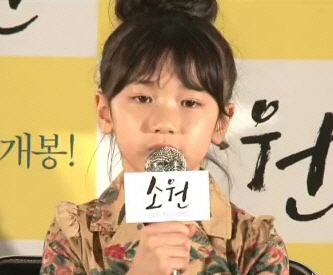
Lee in 2013

Lee started her career by working as a model. She made her acting debut in the television series Goodbye Dear Wife (2012). She made an indelible impression in her first film appearance, playing an elementary school student trying to overcome the trauma of violent sexual aggression in director Lee Joon-ik's 2013 film Hope, for which her acting range was widely praised. For her performance in the movie, Lee won the Best Supporting Actress Award at the Beijing International Film Festival. She gained widespread acclaim for her performance in the films How to Steal a Dog (2014), A Melody to Remember (2016) and the drama Six Flying Dragons (2015).

In 2017, she took part in the Korean voice-dubbing of the Japanese animated film Your Name (2016). In 2020, she starred in the film Peninsula, the sequel to the blockbuster zombie film Train to Busan (2016).

In July 2023, Lee signed with new agency Noon Company. Later that year, Lee appeared in the television series Castaway Diva (2023).

== Filmography ==
=== Film ===
Year	Title	Role	Notes	Ref.
2013	Hope	Im So-won		
2014	How to Steal a Dog	Ji-so		
2016	A Melody to Remember	Soon-ee		
2017	Your Name	Yotsuha Miyamizu	Voice dubbing	
2018	Seven Years of Night	Yoo Se-ryung		
2019	Innocent Witness	Kyung-hee	Special appearance	
2019	Miss & Mrs. Cops	young Ji-hye		
2020	Peninsula	Joon-i		
2023	It's Okay!	In-yeong		
2026	Strange Snack Shop Jeoncheondang	Yo-mi		

=== Television series ===
Year	Title	Role	Notes	Ref.
2012	Goodbye Dear Wife	Min-seo		
2012	The Chaser	Yoon Chang-min's daughter		
2012	Here Comes Mr. Oh	Byul		
2015	Super Daddy Yeol	Cha Sa-rang		
2015	Six Flying Dragons	young Boon-yi		
2016	Come Back Mister	Kim Han-na		
2017	Witch at Court	child Ma Yi-deum		
2018	Radio Romance	young Song Geu-rim		
2018	Memories of the Alhambra	Jung Min-joo		
2020	Start-Up	young Won In-jae		
2021	Hello, Me!	Ban Ha-ni (young)		
2021	Hometown	Jo Jae-young		
2022	Drama Stage: "Stock of High School"	Ahn Hyung-in	one act-drama; season 5	
2023	Castaway Diva	young Seo Mok-ha		
2025	Shin's Project	Lee Si-on		
TBA	The Mysterious Candy Store	Yomi		

=== Web series ===
Year	Title	Role	Notes	Ref.
2021–present	Hellbound	Jin Hee-jung	Season 1–2	
2022	Move to Heaven	butterfly girl	Cameo (episode 10)	

== Accolades ==
=== Awards and nominations ===
Year	Award	Category	Nominated work	Result	Ref.
2014	4th Beijing International Film Festival	Best Supporting Actress	Hope	Won	
2014	50th Baeksang Arts Awards	Best New Actress – Film	Hope	Nominated	
2015	4th Marie Claire Film Festival	Best New Actress	How to Steal a Dog	Won	
2015	52nd Grand Bell Awards	Best New Actress	How to Steal a Dog	Nominated	
2017	31st KBS Drama Awards	Best Young Actress	Witch at Court	Won	
2018	KBS Drama Awards	Best Young Actress	Radio Romance	Nominated	
2020	29th Buil Film Awards	Best Supporting Actress	Peninsula	Won	
2021	41st Blue Dragon Film Awards	Best Supporting Actress	Peninsula	Nominated	
2021	57th Baeksang Arts Awards	Best Supporting Actress – Film	Peninsula	Nominated	
2021	26th Chunsa Film Art Awards 2021	Best Supporting Actress	Peninsula	Nominated	
2021	KBS Drama Awards	Best Young Actress	Hello, Me!	Won	

=== Listicles ===
Name of publisher, year listed, name of listicle, and placement
Publisher	Year	Listicle	Placement	Ref.
Moviewalker Press	2024	10 Korean Actors that Movie Writers Recommended in 2024	Top 10	
