= Hope (2013 film) =

South Korean film

- Film poster
- Hangul: 소원
- Hanja: 所願
- RR: Sowon
- MR: Sowŏn
- Directed by: Lee Joon-ik
- Written by: Jo Joong-hoon; Kim Ji-hye
- Produced by: Byun Bong-hyun; Seong Chang-yeon; Kim Yong-dae
- Starring: Sul Kyung-gu; Uhm Ji-won; Lee Re
- Cinematography: Kim Tae-gyeong
- Edited by: Kim Sang-bum; Kim Jae-bum
- Music by: Bang Jun-seok
- Distributed by: Lotte Entertainment
- Release date: October 2, 2013
- Running time: 122 minutes
- Country: South Korea
- Language: Korean
- Box office: US$17.1 million

Hope (Korean: 소원; RR: Sowon), also known as Wish, is a 2013 South Korean tragedy film directed by Lee Joon-ik, starring Sul Kyung-gu, Uhm Ji-won and Lee Re. It won Best Film at the 34th Blue Dragon Film Awards.

The film is based on a true story, the infamous Cho Doo-soon case in 2008, in which an 8-year-old girl, named "Na-young" in the South Korean press, was raped and beaten by a 57-year-old man in a public bathroom. The court sentenced the man to only 12 years in prison, which caused outrage in the country due to the brutality of the crime and the man's history of physical and sexual violence.

== Plot ==
A young girl named So-won lives an idyllic life with her working-class parents Dong-hoon and Mi-hee. One day on her way to school, So-won is kidnapped, beaten and raped by a male stranger named Jong-sool before being left for dead. Fortunately, she survives and calls an ambulance.

The police notify Dong-hoon and Mi-hee of the attack and they rush to the emergency ward. Upon their arrival at the hospital, they are horrified by the extent of So-won's injuries. So-won suffers from multiple internal injuries and has to undergo major surgeries. Dong-hoon is advised by a surgeon that So-won will have to wear a colostomy bag for the rest of her life. Once So-won regains consciousness, she will also have to identify her attacker and testify in court with the help of Jung-sook, a psychiatrist.

So-won's attacker is arrested at his home. The case becomes a media sensation, much to the horror of her family and friends. When the reporters converge at the hospital, Dong-hoon takes So-won to a different room and hides her from the media attention. So-won exhibits symptoms of post-traumatic stress disorder and briefly mistakes her father for her attacker, screaming at him as he tries to fix her colostomy bag. Dong-hoon is heartbroken by this episode, and is further hurt when So-won refuses to look at him or speak to him. Mi-hee faints and is hospitalized as well while trying to control the situation; later it is revealed that she is pregnant.

Mi-hee initially refuses psychological help for her daughter as she wishes for So-won to resume her normal life. However, she relents after understanding her daughter's mental state and enlists the help of Jung-sook. Dong-hoon struggles to pay for medical expenses and calls his friend and manager, Gwang-sik, with the intent of quitting his job to help take care of his family. Gwang-sik is aware of Dong-hoon's situation and convinces him to keep his job, also providing him with money to pay for So-won's medical bills.

Mi-hee and her friends rent mascot costumes to play with So-won to help cheer her up; this gives Dong-hoon the idea to hide underneath the costume of his daughter's favorite cartoon character, Cocomong, to communicate with her. So-won is unaware of who is underneath the costume, but she opens up to "Cocomong" and allows him to hug her. Gradually, So-won's physical condition improves and she can return home. During the car ride home, So-won vomits after passing the site where she was attacked. She and her parents are soon comforted as they notice that the local community has decorated their home with notes of encouragement. Mi-hee is touched as she sees that their home has also been cleaned during their absence.

Dong-hoon resumes work but also finds the time to dress up as Cocomong and accompany So-won on her way to and from school. Soon, her mental state improves and she realises that her father has been hiding underneath the costume the entire time. Touched by his love and concern for her, she takes off the head of the costume and can look at her father for the first time since her hospitalization.

The family is worried about the upcoming trial as So-won has to testify against her attacker. With great effort, they attend the trial and So-won describes what happened during the attack and identifies her attacker. Unfortunately, the man is only sentenced to 12 years in prison, angering So-won's family and friends. A fight breaks out in the courtroom with Dong-hoon intending to kill the attacker. So-won stops Dong-hoon and begs him to take her home. The family leaves the courtroom with little closure.

Sometime later, Mi-hee has given birth to a son named So-mang and is congratulated by family and friends, including Jung-sook and Gwang-sik. In the closing narration, So-won confides that she still struggles mentally and often has to leave school early, though the birth of her brother has given her a renewed sense of purpose.

== Cast ==
- Lee Re as Im So-won
- Sul Kyung-gu as Im Dong-hoon, So-won's father
- Uhm Ji-won as Kim Mi-hee, So-won's mother and Dong-hoon's wife
- Kim Hae-sook as Song Jung-sook, psychiatrist
- Kim Sang-ho as Han Gwang-sik, Dong-hoon's best friend
- Ra Mi-ran as Mi-hee's friend and Gwang-sik's wife
- Yang Jin-sung as Do-kyung, police officer
- Kim Do-yeob as Han Young-seok, So-won's friend and Gwang-sik and his wife's son
- Kang Sung-hae as Choi Jong-sul, perpetrator

== Background ==
On December 11, 2008, an eight-year-old third grader (known by her pseudonym "Na-young") was on her way to school when she was kidnapped by Cho Doo-soon (Jo Du-sun), a 57-year-old man living in Ansan. Cho repeatedly raped Na-young in an abandoned public church restroom, and as the child resisted, he beat, strangled and attempted to drown her in a toilet until she lost consciousness. Her parents found Na-young near death, and she was taken to a local hospital where after an eight-hour surgery, she had a prolonged stay in the intensive care unit. Doctors said Na-young sustained irreversible damage to her genitals, anus and intestines, which initially required her to wear a colostomy bag to replace her missing organs. Cho was arrested three days after the incident; he was a habitual sex offender with 17 prior crimes, and had spent three years in prison for rape in 1983.

Prosecutors had demanded life imprisonment for Cho, and more than 400,000 angry netizens signed a petition at Internet portal site Daum calling for capital punishment. A lower district court sentenced Cho to a 12-year jail term, citing his temporary loss of sound judgment due to inebriation, which was upheld by the Supreme Court in 2009. This relatively lenient sentence sparked widespread public outrage, prompting even then-President Lee Myung-bak to express regret over the ruling during a Cabinet meeting. Cho was incarcerated in a maximum security prison in North Gyeongsang Province.

Na-young's parents, represented by the Korean Bar Association, filed a lawsuit against the prosecution for subjecting their daughter to unnecessary physical and psychological distress; they cited the prosecution's hours-long, extended questioning soon after Na-young underwent major surgery during which she sat in discomfort and was forced to answer the same questions four times due to the prosecutors' inexperience with the electronic recording equipment, their inability to follow protocol in obtaining testimony from a minor (taping her in plain sight of other patients at a hospital ward), and their delay in exhibiting a key piece of evidence (the arrest videotape of Cho) which would have eliminated the need for her to take the witness stand. Prosecutor-General Kim Joon-gyu later apologized to the family. In 2011, the appellate division of the Seoul Central District Court upheld the court's previous decision ordering the government to pay ₩13 million (US$11,509) in compensation to Na-young.

== Production ==
Director Lee Joon-ik had retired briefly from the local film industry following the lackluster commercial performance of his previous effort Battlefield Heroes (2011). He returned two years later with Hope, casting top actor Sul Kyung-gu in one of the lead roles. Lee said he wanted to "make a happy movie that begins with a tragedy. With this heartbreaking material, I wanted to make the film as happy as possible. I am going to present a human drama where hope blooms at the edge of unhappiness and desperation, after a series of ordeals and hardships." He maintained that he made the film to "encourage Na-young and other victims of sex crimes," and that instead of other films with a similar subject matter that focus on sensationalist aspects, like the crime itself, Hope is about "what happens after, and is more about showing how life is good and worth living, emphasizing how the community rallied around the victim."

Actress Uhm Ji-won had previously declined the film two years before, thinking she wasn't talented enough or ready to take on the intense emotions her role (as So-won's mother) required. But when Sol's wife and her close friend Song Yun-ah sent the script to her, Uhm said, "I started to think that this movie was supposed to come to me. I felt that someone should tell this valuable story. And I gained the courage to think that I could try it."

Shooting began in Changwon on April 13, 2013. Throughout the filming, Sol stayed in character as So-won's father, wearing his character's clothes all the time. The film wrapped on June 24, 2013, in Busan; the entire cast attended the final day of filming.

== Reception ==
Hope was released in theaters on October 2, 2013. It had a soft opening, but through strong word of mouth, the film surpassed Tough as Iron (which opened on the same day), and topped the local box office chart with 1.21 million tickets sold (US$5.2 million) on its first week. On October 9, a public holiday, Hope recorded 210,000 admissions, the daily highest during its screening period. It increased its ticket sales by chalking up a 16% increase from its October 3 tally of 187,804 admissions. By its second week, it had reached 2.4 million admissions (₩11.9 billion), demonstrating it had strong legs by dropping only 8% and 29% in its second and third weekends. It stayed on the box office top ten in its third week, adding 290,000 to its modest hit status, with 2.67 million admissions. At the end of its run, its total admissions stood at 2,711,003, with a gross of ₩18,529,474,100.

Hope was sold to five Asian countries—Japan, Hong Kong, Singapore, Malaysia and Indonesia at the Asian Film Market during the 18th Busan International Film Festival. Hong Kong-based major financing and distribution company EDKO commented on the film as "a warm and considerate account of a highly controversial subject matter."

It was invited to be the opening film of the 8th Festival du Film Coréen à Paris ("Korean Film Festival in Paris") in 2013, and shortly after, was also shown at the London Korean Film Festival.

Hope was the surprise winner for Best Film at the 34th Blue Dragon Film Awards, defeating blockbusters Miracle in Cell No. 7, Snowpiercer and The Face Reader. It also took Best Screenplay and Best Supporting Actress for Ra Mi-ran. In her acceptance speech, a tearful Ra said, "I want to say this to the many girls out there who are in suffering like So-won—it's not your fault. It's OK. Please have strength." Ra again won at the KOFRA Film Awards (organized by the Korean Film Reporters Association), and Uhm Ji-won won Best Actress at the Korean Association of Film Critics Awards.

Apart from accolades from critics and audiences for "its focus on family, heartfelt emotion and feel-good message," the film has also drawn criticism for "trying to turn one of the most infamous news stories in recent years into a maudlin piece of mass entertainment," and that "it is too idealistic in depicting how the family overcomes the assault," with some people questioning whether it was right to profit from such a horrible event, no matter the intentions of the filmmaker.

== Awards and nominations ==
Year	Award	Category	Recipient	Result
2013	34th Blue Dragon Film Awards	Best Film	Hope	Won
2013	34th Blue Dragon Film Awards	Best Director	Lee Joon-ik	Nominated
2013	34th Blue Dragon Film Awards	Best Actor	Sul Kyung-gu	Nominated
2013	34th Blue Dragon Film Awards	Best Actress	Uhm Ji-won	Nominated
2013	34th Blue Dragon Film Awards	Best Supporting Actress	Ra Mi-ran	Won
2013	34th Blue Dragon Film Awards	Best Screenplay	Jo Joong-hoon, Kim Ji-hye	Won
2013	34th Blue Dragon Film Awards	Best Music	Bang Jun-seok	Nominated
2013	33rd Korean Association of Film Critics Awards	Best Actress	Uhm Ji-won	Won
2013	Korean Film Actor's Association	Top Film Star Award	Uhm Ji-won	Won
2014	5th KOFRA Film Awards	Best Film	Hope	Nominated
2014	5th KOFRA Film Awards	Best Supporting Actress	Ra Mi-ran	Won
2014	19th Chunsa Film Art Awards	Best Director	Lee Joon-ik	Nominated
2014	19th Chunsa Film Art Awards	Best Screenplay	Jo Joong-hoon, Kim Ji-hye	Nominated
2014	4th Beijing International Film Festival	Best Supporting Actress	Lee Re	Won
2014	50th Baeksang Arts Awards	Best Film	Hope	Nominated
2014	50th Baeksang Arts Awards	Best Director	Lee Joon-ik	Nominated
2014	50th Baeksang Arts Awards	Best Actor	Sul Kyung-gu	Won
2014	50th Baeksang Arts Awards	Best Actress	Uhm Ji-won	Nominated
2014	50th Baeksang Arts Awards	Best Supporting Actress	Ra Mi-ran	Nominated
2014	50th Baeksang Arts Awards	Best New Actress	Lee Re	Nominated
2014	50th Baeksang Arts Awards	Best Screenplay	Jo Joong-hoon, Kim Ji-hye	Won
2014	44th Giffoni Film Festival	Gryphon Award for Best Film (Generator +18)	Hope	Won
2014	51st Grand Bell Awards	Best Film	Hope	Nominated
2014	51st Grand Bell Awards	Best Director	Lee Joon-ik	Nominated
2014	51st Grand Bell Awards	Best Actress	Uhm Ji-won	Nominated
2014	51st Grand Bell Awards	Best Supporting Actress	Ra Mi-ran	Nominated
