= Hello, Me! =

2021 South Korean comedy mystery TV series

- Promotional poster
- Hangul: 안녕? 나야!
- Hanja: 安寧? 나야!
- Lit.: Hello? It's Me!
- RR: Annyeong? naya!
- MR: Annyŏng? naya!
- Genre: Drama; Fantasy; Romantic comedy
- Created by: Moon Jun-ha; KBS Drama Production
- Based on: Fantastic Girl by Kim Hye-jung
- Written by: Yoo Song-yi
- Directed by: Lee Hyun-seok
- Starring: Choi Kang-hee; Kim Young-kwang; Lee Re; Eum Moon-suk
- Music by: Choi in-hee
- Country of origin: South Korea
- Original language: Korean
- No. of episodes: 16

Production
- Executive producer: Kim Sang Hue (KBS)
- Producers: Jung Ah-reum; Jung Hyun-joo
- Camera setup: Single-camera
- Running time: 70 minutes (KBS2); 60-65 minutes (Netflix)
- Production companies: Beyond J; Acemaker Movieworks

Original release
- Network: KBS2
- Release: February 17 – April 8, 2021

Hello, Me! (Korean: 안녕? 나야!) is a South Korean drama starring Choi Kang-hee, Kim Young-kwang, Lee Re and Eum Moon-suk. It is based on the 2011 novel Fantastic Girl by Kim Hye-jung. The drama premiered on KBS2 between February 17 and April 8, 2021, and is available for worldwide streaming on Netflix.

== Synopsis ==
Hello, Me! tells the story of Ban Ha-ni who meets her enthusiastic, passionate, and fearless 17-year-old self one day. With her younger self, she heals her wounds and learns how to love again.

== Cast ==
=== Main ===
- Choi Kang-hee as 37-year-old Ban Ha-ni
  - Lee Re as 17-year-old Ban Ha-ni
- Kim Young-kwang as Han Yoo-hyun
  - Choi Seung-hoon as young Yoo-hyun
- Eum Moon-suk as Anthony / Yang Chun-sik
  - Kim Sang-woo as young Chun-sik

=== Supporting ===
==== Ha-ni's Family ====
- Jung Yi-rang as Ban Ha-young, Ha-ni's older sister
  - Song Ji-hyun as young Ha-young
- Moon Sung-hyun as Chae Chi-su, Ha-young's husband
  - Moon Sung-hyun as young Chi-su
- Moon Seong-hyun as Chae Seong-woo, Ha-young and Chi-su's son
- Kim Byeong-chun as Ban Gi-tae, Ha-ni's father
- Yoon Bok-in as Ji Ok-jung, Ha-ni's mother
- Kim Yong-rim as Lee Hong-nyun, Ha-ni's grandmother

==== Yoo-hyun's Family ====
- Yoon Joo-sang as Han Ji-man, Yoo-hyun's father
- Baek Hyun-joo as Han Ji-sook, Yoo-hyun's aunt
- Ji Seung-hyun as Yang Do-yoon, Yoo-hyun's cousin
- Kim Yoo-mi as Oh Ji-eun, Do-yoon's wife
  - Lee Seo-yeon as young Ji-eun, Ha-ni's sidekick

==== Joa Confectionery ====
- Kim Kiri as Kim Yong-hwa
- Choi Tae-hwan as Cha Seung-seok
- Go Woo-ri as Bang Ok-joo
- Kim Mi-hwa as Kang Geum-ja
- Kim Do-yeon as Cha Mi-ja
- Shin Mun-sung as Ko Jung-do

==== The Point Entertainment ====
- Choi Dae-chul as Park Jung-man, CEO of The Point Entertainment
- Kang Tae-joo as Min Kyung-shik, Ahn So-ni's manager

==== Others ====
- Park Chul-min as Young-goo
- Jung Dae-ro as Il-goo
- Lee Gyu-hyun as Master Jobs
- Lee Chae-mi as Go So-hye

=== Special appearances ===
- Jang Ki-yong as police officer(Ep. 1)
- Lee Soo-hyuk as police officer(Ep. 1)
- Hong Rocky as himself (Ep. 1)
- Jo Han-chul as store manager (Ep. 1-2)
- Jin Hee-kyung as Writer Kim (Ep. 4)

== Episodes ==
No.	Title	Directed by	Written by	Original release date	South Korea viewers (millions)
1	"Episode 1"	Lee Hyun-seok	Yoo Song-yi	February 17, 2021	0.888
2	"Episode 2"	Lee Hyun-seok	Yoo Song-yi	February 18, 2021	0.676
3	"Episode 3"	Lee Hyun-seok	Yoo Song-yi	February 24, 2021	0.825
4	"Episode 4"	Lee Hyun-seok	Yoo Song-yi	February 25, 2021	N/A
5	"Episode 5"	Lee Hyun-seok	Yoo Song-yi	March 3, 2021	0.771
6	"Episode 6"	Lee Hyun-seok	Yoo Song-yi	March 4, 2021	N/A
7	"Episode 7"	Lee Hyun-seok	Yoo Song-yi	March 10, 2021	N/A
8	"Episode 8"	Lee Hyun-seok	Yoo Song-yi	March 11, 2021	N/A

== Production ==
The first script reading took place in September 2020.

== Original soundtrack ==
Hello, Me! OST

Soundtrack album by Various artists
- Released: 2021
- Genre: Soundtrack
- Languages: Korean; English
- Labels: Warner Music Korea; MusicGround; BY4M

=== Part 1 ===
Released on February 18, 2021
No.	Title	Lyrics	Music	Artist	Length
1.	"Wake Up"	Nuvocity	Nuvocity	Weeekly	3:14
2.	"Your Eyes" (inst.)		Nuvocity		3:14
Total length:					6:28

=== Part 2 ===
Released on February 25, 2021
No.	Title	Lyrics	Music	Artist	Length
1.	"Tonight" (오늘 밤)	Eo Young-soo	Eo Young-soo; Choi Soo-in; Kim Sung-hyun	Lee Min-hyuk	4:03
2.	"Tonight" (inst.)		Eo Young-soo; Choi Soo-in; Kim Sung-hyun		4:03
Total length:					8:06

=== Part 3 ===
Released on March 4, 2021
No.	Title	Lyrics	Music	Artist	Length
1.	"3!4!"	Lee Hyun-do	Lee Hyun-do	Soya; DinDin	3:50
2.	"3!4!" (inst.)		Lee Hyun-do		3:50
Total length:					7:40

=== Part 4 ===
Released on March 11, 2021
No.	Title	Lyrics	Music	Artist	Length
1.	"Someday" (그 시간, 그 공간)	Hana; Shin Yong-soo	Psycho Tension	Huh Gak	3:06
2.	"Someday" (inst.)		Psycho Tension		3:06
Total length:					6:12

=== Part 5 ===
Released on March 21, 2021
No.	Title	Lyrics	Music	Artist	Length
1.	"Cloudy Day" (흐린 날)	Shoulder Gangster	Shoulder Gangster	Sondia	4:05
2.	"Cloudy Day" (inst.)		Shoulder Gangster		4:05
Total length:					8:10

=== Part 6 ===
Released on March 26, 2021
No.	Title	Lyrics	Music	Artist	Length
1.	"Don't Smile At Me" (웃어주지 말아요)	Park Jung-joon	Park Jung-joon; Lee Yong-tae; Lee Hyo-jung	Soyou	3:30
2.	"Don't Smile At Me" (inst.)		Park Jung-joon; Lee Yong-tae; Lee Hyo-jung		3:30
Total length:					7:00

=== Part 7 ===
Released on April 1, 2021
No.	Title	Lyrics	Music	Artist	Length
1.	"That's Life, Isn't It?" (산다는 건 다 그런게 아니겠니)	Cho Byung-sik	Cho Byung-sik	Floody	3:40
2.	"Life" (inst.)		Cho Byung-sik		3:40
Total length:					7:20

== Viewership ==
Hello, Me! : South Korea viewers per episode (thousands)

Season	Episode number																Average
Season	1	2	3	4	5	6	7	8	9	10	11	12	13	14	15	16	Average
1	888	676	825	N/A	771	N/A	N/A	N/A	N/A	N/A	N/A	N/A	N/A	608	TBD	TBD	TBD

Source: Audience measurement performed nationwide by Nielsen Korea

Average TV viewership ratings
Ep.	Part	Original broadcast date	Average audience share (Nielsen Korea)
Ep.	Part	Original broadcast date	Nationwide
1	1	February 17, 2021	3.8%
1	2	February 17, 2021	4.9%
2	1	February 18, 2021	3.1%
2	2	February 18, 2021	3.6%
3	1	February 24, 2021	3.2%
3	2	February 24, 2021	5.1%
4	1	February 25, 2021	2.7%
4	2	February 25, 2021	3.1%
5	1	March 3, 2021	3.4%
5	2	March 3, 2021	3.9%
6	1	March 4, 2021	2.3%
6	2	March 4, 2021	3.1%
7	1	March 10, 2021	3.0%
7	2	March 10, 2021	3.9%
8	1	March 11, 2021	2.7%
8	2	March 11, 2021	3.4%
9	1	March 17, 2021	2.8%
9	2	March 17, 2021	3.7%
10	1	March 18, 2021	2.7%
10	2	March 18, 2021	3.5%
11	1	March 24, 2021	2.6%
11	2	March 24, 2021	3.9%
12	1	March 25, 2021	2.5%
12	2	March 25, 2021	3.2%
13	1	March 31, 2021	2.7%
13	2	March 31, 2021	3.7%
14	1	April 1, 2021	2.7%
14	2	April 1, 2021	4.0%
15	1	April 7, 2021	3.3%
15	2	April 7, 2021	4.2%
16	1	April 8, 2021	4.0%
16	2	April 8, 2021	3.3%
Average			3.38%
In the table above, the blue numbers represent the lowest ratings and the red numbers represent the highest ratings.; NR denotes that the series did not rank in the top 20 daily programs on that date.; N/A denotes that the rating is not known.

== Awards and nominations ==
Name of the award ceremony, year presented, category, nominee of the award, and the result of the nomination
Award ceremony	Year	Category	Nominee / Work	Result	Ref.
Seoul International Drama Awards	2021	Outstanding Korean Drama	Hello, Me!	Nominated	
KBS Drama Awards	2021	Best Young Actress	Lee Re	Won	
KBS Drama Awards	2021	Excellence Award, Actress in a Miniseries	Choi Kang-hee	Nominated	
