= Choi Dae-chul =

South Korean actor

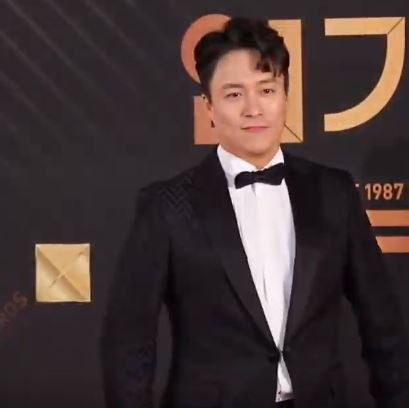
- Choi in December 2019
- Born: Choi Won-chul; October 16, 1978 (age 48); South Korea
- Education: Hanyang University - Dance
- Occupation: Actor
- Years active: 2002–present
- Agent: Acom My ENT

Korean name
- Hangul: 최원철
- RR: Choe Woncheol
- MR: Ch'oe Wŏnch'ŏl

Stage name
- Hangul: 최대철
- RR: Choe Daecheol
- MR: Ch'oe Taech'ŏl

Choi Dae-chul (born Choi Won-chul; October 16, 1978) is a South Korean actor.

== Career ==
Choi began his career in musical theatre in 2002. He also played his roles in television dramas such as Wang's Family (2013), Jang Bo-ri Is Here! (2014), My Daughter, Geum Sa-wol (2015), and Our Gap-soon (2016). He is known for his leading role in KBS2's For Eagle Brothers.

Due to the success of his television series which were mostly in the Saturday and Sunday television slot, he has been called by media outlets the "Park Bo-gum of Weekend Dramas".

== Theater ==
Year	Title	Role	Reprised	Ref.
2004	Don Giovanni			
2004	The Last Empress	Hong Gye-hun	2009	
2004	Hard Rock Cafe			
	Bastard, Bastard, Bastard			
2005	Go! Waikiki Brothers		2009	
2007	Innocent Steps	Young-sae		
2007	Audition			
2008	Manhwabang Misugi	Kim Jin-soo		
2008	Xanadu	Terpsichore		
2009	Dracula, the Musical	Dracula/Jonathan Harker		
2009	The Prince and the Pauper			
2010	All That Jazz	Yoo Tae-min		
2010	I'll Marry in May	Multi-Man	2011–2012	
2010	The Great Catsby	Houndu	2011	
2011	If I Am with You	Father	2012, 2013	
2011	On Air Chocolate	Alex		
2012	Pinkie Finger	Lee Yong-ho		
2012	More Chocolate	PD Kang Chul-han	2013	
2014	Five Course Love			
2014	Room of Hobbies	Akio Mizusawa		
2019	A Better Tomorrow	Mark		

== Filmography ==
=== Television series ===
Year	Title	Role	Notes	Ref.
2011	Gwanggaeto, The Great Conqueror	So Ah-chun		
2011	Princess Hwapyung's Weight Loss	Baek Mo-jin		
2011	Our Happy Days of Youth			
2011	Ji-hoon, Born in 1982			
2012	Bridal Mask	Reporter Song		
2013	Wang's Family	Wang Don		
2014	Ugly Miss Young-ae 13		Cameo	
2014	Jang Bo-ri Is Here!	Kang Nae-chun		
2014	You Are My Destiny	Chief Secretary Tak		
2014	Marriage, Not Dating		Cameo	
2014	The Tale of the Bookworm	Guru Lee		
2014	The Final Puzzle	Min-chul		
2014	House, Mate	Dae-chul		
2014	You Are the Only One	Noh Young-gi		
2015	Super Daddy Yeol	Shim Sang-hae		
2015	Who Are You: School 2015	Swimming coach		
2015	The Time We Were Not in Love	Department Head Yoon		
2015	My Daughter, Geum Sa-wol	Im Shi-ro		
2015	Sweet Home, Sweet Honey	Lee Bae-dal		
2016	Becky's Back	Cha Jong-myung		
2016	Love in the Moonlight	Eunuch Ma		
2016	Our Gap-soon	Jo Geum-sik		
2017	Introverted Boss	Restaurant owner	Cameo, ep. 4	
2017	The Rebel	Bak Won-jong		
2017	Band of Sisters	Jo Geum-man	Cameo	
2017	Revolutionary Love	Lee Tae-kyung		
2017	Meloholic	Lee Joo-seung		
2017	Jugglers	Bong Jang-woo		
2018	Evergreen	CEO Nam Ji-seok		
2018	Marry Me Now	Team Leader Go		
2018	After the Rain	Dae-chang		
2018	The Beauty Inside	Donor	Cameo, ep.1	
2019	Liver or Die	Jeon Chil-bok		
2019	My Fellow Citizens!	Detective Lee		
2019	Everybody Say Kungdari	Young Jang Kook-Hwan	Ep. 1–9	
2019	Vagabond	Kim Do-soo		
2019	House of the Universe	House owner		
2019	When the Camellia Blooms	Hwang Kyu-shik		
2019	Psychopath Diary	Gong Chan-seok		
2020	Born Again	Seo Tae-ha		
2020	Awaken	Yoon Seok-pil		
2021	Hello, Me!	Park Jung-man		
2021	Undercover	Choo Dong-woo		
2021	Revolutionary Sisters	Bae Byeon-ho		
2021	Inspector Koo	Heo Sung-tae		
2022	The Golden Spoon	Lee Cheol		
2022	Eve	Kang Yoon-Kyum's friend		
2022	Red Balloon	Jo Dae-Geun		
2023	Our Blooming Youth	Eunuch So		
2023	The Real Has Come!	Gong Chun-myeong		
2025	For Eagle Brothers	Oh Chun-Soo		

=== Web series ===
Year	Title	Role	Notes	Ref.
2022	Boys Flight	Team Kang	Season 1–2	

=== Film ===
Year	Title	Role	Ref.
2012	Don't Cry Mommy	Yoo-lim's ex-husband	
2015	Snowy Road	Bar owner (cameo)	
2016	Hiya	Gong Chang-bong	
2019	Race to Freedom: Um Bok Dong	Chun Byung-chul	
2022	The Fisherman	Jong-hoon	
2025	A Child of Silent	Jong min	
2025	East Shore Line	kang chun ho	

=== Television shows ===
Year	Title	Role	Ref.
2019	King of Mask Singer	Contestant (Wing) Episode 187	
2022	Hot Singers	Cast Member	

== Awards and nominations ==
Year	Award	Category	Nominated work	Result	Ref.
2015	MBC Drama Awards	Best Supporting Actor in a Special Project Drama	My Daughter, Geum Sa-wol	Nominated	
2016	KBS Drama Awards	Best Supporting Actor	Love in the Moonlight; Sweet Home, Sweet Honey; Becky's Back	Nominated	
2019	KBS Drama Awards	Best Supporting Actor	Liver or Die; When the Camellia Blooms	Nominated	
2019	SBS Drama Awards	Best Supporting Team (Note: with Park Ah-in, Moon Jeong-hee and Kim Jung-hyun)	Vagabond	Nominated	
2021	KBS Drama Awards	Best Supporting Actor	Revolutionary Sisters	Won	
2022	MBC Drama Awards	Best Supporting Actor	The Golden Spoon	Nominated	
