= Hong Eun-hee =

South Korean actress (born 1980)

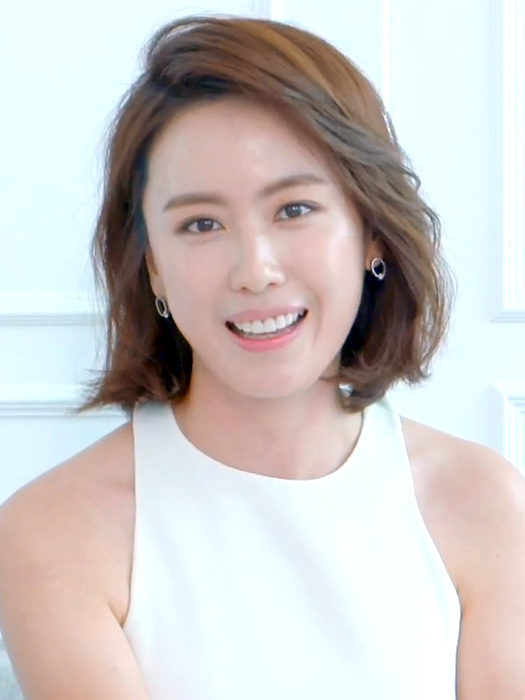
- Hong in February 2020
- Born: February 17, 1980 (age 46); Jeongeup, South Korea
- Education: Seoul Institute of the Arts
- Occupation: Actress
- Years active: 1998–present
- Agent: B.Wave Entertainment
- Spouse: Yoo Jun-sang (m. 2003)
- Children: 2 sons

Korean name
- Hangul: 홍은희
- Hanja: 洪銀姬
- RR: Hong Eunhui
- MR: Hong Ŭnhŭi

Hong Eun-hee (Korean: 홍은희; born February 17, 1980) is a South Korean actress.

== Career ==
In 2004, Hong signed a contract with Namoo Actors. Twenty-two years later, in 2026, she signed an exclusive contract with B.Wave Entertainment, becoming the agency's first actor.

== Filmography ==
=== Film ===
Year	Title	Role	Notes
2025	Love Untangled	Baek Jang-Mi	

=== Television series ===
Year	Title	Role	Notes/Ref.
1999	You're One-of-a-Kind		
1999	Hur Jun	Queen Inmok	
1999	Michiko		
2000	More Than Love		
2001	The Merchant	Mi-geum	
2002	My Love Patzzi	Eun Hee-won	
2002	Shoot for the Stars	Ye-rin	
2002	April Story		
2003	Rose Fence	Yoon Ji-sun	
2005	TV Novel: Wind Flower	Kim Young-sil	
2005	Tears of Diamond	Jeon Ga-hee	
2007	Golden Bride	Kang Won-mi	
2008	Don't Be Swayed	Lee Soo-hyun	
2009	Enjoy Life	Hong Kyung-soo	
2012	My Husband Got a Family	Difficult actress (cameo, episode 18)	
2012	Dream of the Emperor	Queen Seondeok (episodes 19-70)	
2016	Working Mom Parenting Daddy	Lee Mi-so	
2018	Less Than Evil	Kim Hae-joon	
2021	Revolutionary Sisters	Lee Gwang-nam	
2022	Woori the Virgin	Eun-ran	
2026	Love in Disguise	Yoon Mi-jin	

=== Variety/radio shows ===
Year	Title	Notes/Ref.
2005–2006	Yeo Yoo Man Man with Lee Hong-ryeol and Hong Eun-hee	Host
2008	Women of Three Colors Talk Show	Host
2010	Women Who Change the World: Wonder Woman	Host
2010	Good Day	Host
2010–2011	Music Village with Hong Eun-hee	DJ
2013	Live Talk Show Taxi	Host
2014	Real Men: Female Soldier Special - Season 1	Cast member

=== Web shows ===
Year	Title	Role	Notes	Ref.
2021	Chinchin Golf	Host	with Oh Yoon-ah	

=== Music video appearances ===
Year	Title	Role
2003	"Project X"	Despoina (PI)

== Theater ==
Year	Title	Role
2014–2014	Melodramma	Kang Seo-kyung
2016	Horror Stories 3	Ye Sun
2022	Come Back	female teacher

== Awards and nominations ==
Year	Award	Category	Nominated work	Result
2008	MBC Drama Awards	Golden Acting Award, Actress in a Serial Drama	Don't Be Swayed	Won
2013	KBS Drama Awards	Excellence Award, Actress in a Serial Drama	Dream of the Emperor	Nominated
2014	MBC Entertainment Awards	Special Award for a Variety Show	Real Men	Won
2021	KBS Drama Awards	Top Excellence Award, Actress	Revolutionary Sisters	Nominated
2021	KBS Drama Awards	Excellence Award, Actress in a Serial Drama	Revolutionary Sisters	Won
2022	SBS Drama Awards	Best Supporting Actress in a Miniseries Romance/Comedy	Woori the Virgin	Nominated
