= 2021 KBS Drama Awards =

35th edition of award ceremony

- Official logo
- Date: December 31, 2021
- Site: KBS Hall, Yeouido, Seoul
- Hosted by: Lee Do-hyun; Kim So-hyun; Sung Si-kyung
- Official website: KBS Drama Awards

Highlights
- Grand Prize (Daesang): Ji Hyun-woo

Television coverage
- Network: KBS2, KBS World
- Duration: est. 260 minutes
- Viewership: Ratings: 6.5%; Viewership: 1.21 million people

The 2021 KBS Drama Awards, presented by Korean Broadcasting System (KBS), was held on December 31, 2021, at KBS Hall in Yeouido, Seoul. It was hosted by Lee Do-hyun, Kim So-hyun and Sung Si-kyung. Grand Prize (Daesang) was awarded to Ji Hyun-woo.

== Winners and nominees ==
Winners will be listed first and emphasized in bold.

Grand Prize (Daesang)
**Ji Hyun-woo – Young Lady and Gentleman**; Hong Eun-hee – Young Lady and Gentleman; Choi Myung-gil – Red Shoes; Park Eun-bin – The King's Affection; Kim So-hyun – River Where The Moon Rises
Top Excellence Award, Actor	Top Excellence Award, Actress
**Cha Tae-hyun – Police University**; **Lee Do-hyun – Youth of May**; Ji Hyun-woo – Young Lady and Gentleman; Jung Yong-hwa – Sell Your Haunted House; Kim Myung-soo – Royal Secret Agent; Yoon Joo-sang – Revolutionary Sisters	**Kim So-hyun – River Where the Moon Rises**; **Park Eun-bin – The King's Affection**; Choi Myung-gil – Red Shoes; Go Min-si – Youth of May; Hong Eun-hee – Revolutionary Sisters; Jang Na-ra – Sell Your Haunted House
Excellence Award, Actor in a Miniseries	Excellence Award, Actress in a Miniseries
**Jung Yong-hwa – Sell Your Haunted House**; **Kim Min-jae – Dali & Cocky Prince**; Cha Tae-hyun and Jinyoung – Police University; Kim Myung-soo – Royal Secret Agent; Lee Do-hyun – Youth of May	**Go Min-si – Youth of May**; **Kwon Nara – Royal Secret Agent**; Choi Kang-hee – Hello, Me!; Jang Na-ra – Sell Your Haunted House; Kim So-hyun – River Where the Moon Rises; Park Eun-bin – The King's Affection
Excellence Award, Actor in a Serial Drama	Excellence Award, Actress in a Serial Drama
**Yoon Joo-sang – Revolutionary Sisters**; Ji Hyun-woo and Kang Eun-tak – Young Lady and Gentleman; Kim Kyung-nam – Revolutionary Sisters	**Hong Eun-hee – Revolutionary Sisters**; **Park Ha-na – Young Lady and Gentleman**; Cha Hwa-yeon – Young Lady and Gentleman; Jeon Hye-bin – Revolutionary Sisters
Excellence Award, Actor in a Daily Drama	Excellence Award, Actress in a Daily Drama
**Ryu Jin – Be My Dream Family**; Choi Jung-woo – Be My Dream Family; Han Sang-jin – The All-Round Wife; Kyung Sung-hwan – Miss Monte-Cristo; Sunwoo Jae-duk – Red Shoes	**Han Da-gam – The All-Round Wife**; **So Yi-hyun – Red Shoes**; Choi Myung-gil – Red Shoes; Lee So-yeon – Miss Monte-Cristo; Park Joon-geum and Park Tam-hee – Be My Dream Family
Best Supporting Actor	Best Supporting Actress
**Choi Dae-chul – Revolutionary Sisters**; **Lee Yi-kyung – Royal Secret Agent**; Ahn Gil-kang – Sell Your Haunted House; Kim Kang-min – School 2021, Drama Special: "F20"; Kwon Yul – Dali and the Cocky Prince; Lee Jong-won – Young Lady and Gentleman; Lee Sang-yi – Youth of May	**Ham Eun-jung – Be My Dream Family**; **Keum Sae-rok – Youth of May**; Hong Soo-hyun – Police University; Hwang Young-hee – River Where the Moon Rises; Kang Mal-geum – Sell Your Haunted House; Lee Il-hwa – Young Lady and Gentleman; Lee Bo-hee - Revolutionary Sisters
Best Actor in Drama Special/TV Cinema	Best Actress in Drama Special/TV Cinema
**Park Sung-hoon – "My Daughter"**; Ahn Nae-sang – "Nap on the Desert"; Choi Jin-hyuk – "Siren"; Jo Han-sun – "Abyss"; Kang Tae-oh – "A Moment of Romance"; Sung Yoo-bin – "Be;twin"	**Jeon So-min – "My Daughter"**; **Kim Sae-ron – "The Palace"**; Jang Young-nam – "F20"; Kwak Sun-young – "Oddinary"; Shin Ye-eun – "A Moment of Romance"
Best New Actor	Best New Actress
**Kim Yo-han – School 2021**; **Na In-woo – River Where The Moon Rises**; **Rowoon – The King's Affection**; Choo Young-woo – Police University, School 2021; Hong Kyung – Drama Special: "A Moment of Romance'"; Nam Yoon-soo – The King's Affection; Park Ji-hoon – At a Distance, Spring Is Green	**Krystal Jung – Police University**; **Lee Se-hee – Young Lady and Gentleman**; **Park Gyu-young – Dali and the Cocky Prince**; Cho Yi-hyun – School 2021; Hwang Bo-reum-byeol – School 2021; Jung Chae-yeon – The King's Affection; Keum Sae-rok – Youth of May
Best Young Actor	Best Young Actress
**Jo Yi-hyun – Youth of May**; **Seo Woo-jin – Young Lady and Gentleman**; Ko Woo-rim – The King's Affection; Park Sang-hoon – River Where the Moon Rises; Yoo Joon-seo – Young Lady and Gentleman	**Choi Myung-bin – The King's Affection, Young Lady and Gentleman**; **Lee Re – Hello, Me!**; Hong Je-yi – Revolutionary Sisters; Kim Yoon-seul – Drama Special: "My Daughter"; Lee Go-eun – Be My Dream Family
Best Couple Award	Best Writer
**Cha Tae-hyun and Jinyoung – Police University**; **Ji Hyun-woo and Lee Se-hee – Young Lady and Gentleman**; **Kim Min-jae and Park Kyu-young – Dali and the Cocky Prince**; **Kim Yo-han and Cho Yi-hyun – School 2021**; **Lee Do-hyun and Go Min-si – Youth of May**; **Na In-woo and Kim So-hyun – River Where the Moon Rises**; **Rowoon and Park Eun-bin – The King's Affection**	**Kim Sa-kyung – Young Lady and Gentleman**
Popularity Award, Actor	Popularity Award, Actress
**Jinyoung – Police University**; **Rowoon – The King's Affection**	**Kim So-hyun – River Where the Moon Rises**; **Park Eun-bin – The King's Affection**

== Presenters ==
Order of the presentation, name of the presenter(s), and award(s) they presented
Order	Presenter	Award
1	Lee Sang-yi and Lee Cho-hee	Best New Actor/Actress
2	Moon Woo-jin and Kim Ga-yeon (actress)	Best Young Actor/Actress
3	Lee Han-wi and Lee Yoo-young	Best Actor/Actress in Drama Special/TV Cinema
4	Lee Gun-joon (Head of KBS Drama Center) and Park Kyu-young	Best Writer
5	Kim Jae-wook and Jung Soo-jung	Popularity Award
6	Oh Dae-hwan and Oh Yoon-ah	Best Supporting Actor/Actress
7	Jung Yong-hwa and Jin Ki-joo	Excellence Award in a Serial Drama
8	Kang Eun-tak and Park Ha-na	Excellence Award in a Daily Drama
9	Park Sung-hoon and Nana	Excellence Award in a Miniseries
10	Lee Min-jung	Top Excellence Award
11	Kim Ui-chul (CEO of KBS) and Chun Ho-jin	Grand Prize (Daesang)

== Special performances ==
Order of the presentation, name of the artist, and the song(s) they performed
Order	Artist	Performed
1	PROWDMON	"Sunset" (original song by: Crush)
2	Choi Dae-chul, Geum Ho-seok, Jung Hwi-wook	"Le Temps des cathédrales" (대성당들의 시대) (Notre-Dame de Paris OST)
3	Yoon Han	"Moonlight, Flutter" (달빛, 설레인)
3	Baek Ji-young	"If I" (The King's Affection OST)

== See also ==
- 2021 SBS Drama Awards
- 2021 MBC Drama Awards
