= Special Labor Inspector =

2019 South Korean television series

- Promotional poster
- Hangul: 특별근로감독관 조장풍
- Hanja: 特別勤勞監督官 조장풍
- Lit.: Special Labor Inspector Jo Jang-poong
- RR: Teukbyeol geullo gamdokgwan Jo Jangpung
- MR: T'ŭkpyŏl kŭllo kamdokkwan Cho Changp'ung
- Genre: Social satire; Action; Comedy
- Created by: Kang Dae-sun
- Written by: Kim Ban-di
- Directed by: Park Won-kook
- Starring: Kim Dong-wook; Park Se-young; Ryu Deok-hwan; Kim Kyung-nam
- Country of origin: South Korea
- Original language: Korean
- No. of episodes: 32 (Note: In order to circumvent Korean laws that prevent commercial breaks in the middle of an episode, what would previously have been aired as single 70 minute episodes are now being repackaged as two 35 minute episodes, with two episodes being shown each night with a commercial break between the two.)

Production
- Executive producers: Choi Jin-ho; Kim Sung-jo
- Producer: Hong Suk-woo
- Camera setup: Single-camera
- Running time: 35 minutes
- Production companies: Silkwood; Hello Contents

Original release
- Network: MBC TV
- Release: April 8 – May 28, 2019

Special Labor Inspector (Korean: 특별근로감독관 조장풍) is a 2019 South Korean television series starring Kim Dong-wook, Park Se-young, Ryu Deok-hwan and Kim Kyung-nam. It aired from April 8 to May 28, 2019 on MBC TV.

== Synopsis ==
The series follows the story of a civil servant who is appointed as a labor inspector in the Ministry of Employment and Labor.

== Cast ==
=== Main ===
- Kim Dong-wook as Jo Jin-gap, a pure-hearted, hardworking, and honest person with strong sense of justice. He was once a promising judo athlete but was forced to quit after trying to protest an unfair result. He then attempted to become a fitness teacher, but it did not last long as he was unable to control his quick temper in front of the chairman's son. He eventually studied and passed the level nine civil servant exam and becomes a civil servant for a secured government position. However, everything changes when he is assigned as a labor inspector for the Ministry of Employment and Labor.
- Park Se-young as Joo Mi-ran, Jin-gap's ex-wife who is a former judo athlete turned detective.
- Ryu Deok-hwan as Woo Do-ha, an ace lawyer of the legal department at Myeongseong Group.
- Kim Kyung-nam as Cheon Deok-gu, Jin-gap's former pupil who becomes his loyal secret investigator.

=== Supporting ===
- Seol In-ah as Go Mal-sook, the personal secretary of Myeongseong Group's chairperson.
- Oh Dae-hwan as Goo Dae-gil
- Lee Won-jong as Ha Ji-man
- Kang Seo-joon as Lee Dong-young
- Song Ok-sook as Choi Seo-ra
- Go Geon-han as Kim Sun-woo
- Shin Cheol-jin
- Yoo Su-bin
- Lee Sang-yi as Yang Tae-soo

=== Special appearance ===
- Lee Gyu-hyun as Lee Chang Gyu, as an intern doctor.

== Production ==
The first script reading of the cast was held in early January 2019. Ryu Deok-hwan and Park Se-young have previously worked together in the 2012 series Faith.

== Ratings ==
Ep.	Original broadcast date	Average audience share		
Ep.	Original broadcast date	Nielsen Korea		TNmS
Ep.	Original broadcast date	Nationwide	Seoul	Nationwide
1	April 8, 2019	4.3% (NR)	5.0% (NR)	4.0%
2	April 8, 2019	5.0% (NR)	5.8% (17th)	4.1%
3	April 9, 2019	3.9% (NR)	4.2% (NR)	4.3%
4	April 9, 2019	4.7% (NR)	5.2% (NR)	5.2%
5	April 15, 2019	5.4% (19th)	6.5% (14th)	4.3%
6	April 15, 2019	6.3% (15th)	7.7% (8th)	5.3%
7	April 16, 2019	5.8% (17th)	6.8% (10th)	N/A
8	April 16, 2019	6.8% (11th)	7.9% (8th)	5.5%
9	April 22, 2019	5.7% (18th)	6.6% (13th)	N/A
10	April 22, 2019	6.6% (14th)	7.6% (8th)	5.3%
11	April 23, 2019	5.9% (20th)	7.0% (13th)	N/A
12	April 23, 2019	6.4% (18th)	7.6% (10th)	5.7%
13	April 29, 2019	5.7% (18th)	6.5% (14th)	N/A
14	April 29, 2019	6.2% (17th)	7.0% (9th)	5.4%
15	April 30, 2019	5.5% (NR)	6.7% (13th)	N/A
16	April 30, 2019	6.7% (13th)	7.8% (6th)	5.7%
17	May 6, 2019	6.7% (10th)	7.5% (10th)	6.3%
18	May 6, 2019	7.7% (8th)	8.5% (5th)	7.4%
19	May 7, 2019	6.0% (16th)	6.8% (10th)	6.0%
20	May 7, 2019	7.4% (6th)	8.4% (4th)	7.2%
21	May 13, 2019	6.7% (15th)	7.8% (7th)	6.8%
22	May 13, 2019	7.7% (8th)	8.7% (5th)	7.4%
23	May 14, 2019	6.7% (10th)	7.6% (6th)	6.8%
24	May 14, 2019	8.7% (5th)	9.6% (4th)	8.3%
25	May 20, 2019	6.8% (10th)	7.4% (8th)	6.2%
26	May 20, 2019	7.7% (7th)	8.6% (5th)	7.0%
27	May 21, 2019	6.4% (10th)	7.2% (8th)	6.6%
28	May 21, 2019	8.4% (5th)	9.3% (4th)	7.9%
29	May 27, 2019	6.5% (14th)	7.3% (8th)	6.3%
30	May 27, 2019	8.3% (9th)	9.5% (5th)	7.8%
31	May 28, 2019	7.3% (9th)	8.3% (7th)	N/A
32	May 28, 2019	8.3% (5th)	9.1% (4th)	N/A
Average		6.5%	7.4%	— (Note: Due to some unpublished ratings, the exact average rating is unknown.)
In the table above, the blue numbers represent the lowest ratings and the red numbers represent the highest ratings.; NR denotes that the drama did not rank in the top 20 daily programs on that date.; N/A denotes that the rating is not known.

== Awards and nominations ==
Year	Award	Category	Recipient	Result	Ref.
2019	14th Seoul International Drama Awards	Best Actor	Kim Dong-wook	Won	
2019	12th Korea Drama Awards	Top Excellence Award, Actor	Kim Dong-wook	Won	
2019	MBC Drama Awards	Drama of the Year	N/A	Nominated	
2019	MBC Drama Awards	Grand Prize (Daesang)	Kim Dong-wook	Won	
2019	MBC Drama Awards	Top Excellence Award, Actor in a Monday-Tuesday Miniseries	Kim Dong-wook	Won	
2019	MBC Drama Awards	Excellence Award, Actor in a Monday-Tuesday Miniseries	Kim Kyung-nam	Nominated	
2019	MBC Drama Awards	Excellence Award, Actress in a Monday-Tuesday Miniseries	Park Se-young	Won	
2019	MBC Drama Awards	Best Supporting Cast in Monday-Tuesday Miniseries	Oh Dae-hwan	Won	
2019	MBC Drama Awards	Best Supporting Cast in Monday-Tuesday Miniseries	Seol In-ah	Nominated	
2019	MBC Drama Awards	Scene Stealer Award	Song Ok-sook	Nominated	
2019	MBC Drama Awards	Best One-minute Couple Award	Kim Dong-wook & Kim Kyung-nam	Nominated	
2019	MBC Drama Awards	Writer of the Year	Kim Ban-di	Won	
