= Kim Kyung-nam =

South Korean actor (born 1989)

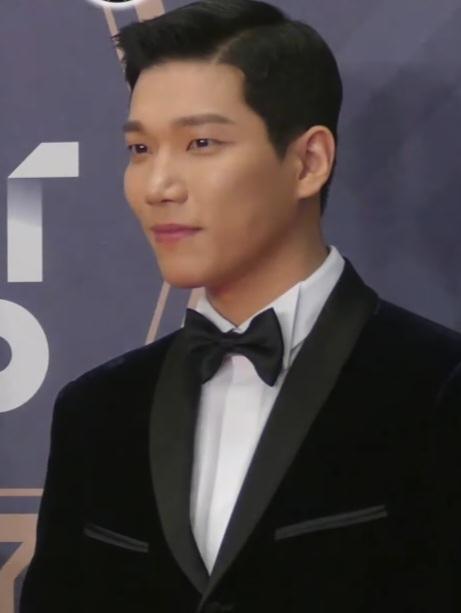
- Kim in January 2019
- Born: December 21, 1989 (age 36); Nowon District, Seoul, South Korea
- Occupation: Actor
- Years active: 2012–present
- Agent: King Kong by Starship

Korean name
- Hangul: 김경남
- RR: Gim Gyeongnam
- MR: Kim Kyŏngnam

Kim Kyung-nam (Korean: 김경남; born December 21, 1989) is a South Korean actor. He is best known for his roles in the television series Prison Playbook (2017–2018), Come and Hug Me (2018), Where Stars Land (2018), Special Labor Inspector (2019), The King: Eternal Monarch (2020), and Revolutionary Sisters (2021).

== Filmography ==
=== Film ===
Year	Title	Role
2017	Come, Together	Massage room employee #2
2018	The Discloser	Sergeant Kwak
2019	Inseparable Bros	Teacher Yook

=== Television series ===
Year	Title	Role	Notes	Ref.
2012	Faith	Assassin		
2013–2014	Shining Romance			
2014	Gap-dong			
2016	Hello, My Twenties!	Oh Hyo-jin	Season 1	
2017	Innocent Defendant	Executive Secretary		
2017	Strongest Deliveryman	Sung-jae		
2017–2018	Prison Playbook	Lee Joon-dol		
2018	Exit	Hong Ki-chul		
2018	Come and Hug Me	Yoon Hyun-moo		
2018	About Time	Police officer	Special appearance	
2018	Where Stars Land	Oh Dae-ki		
2019	Special Labor Inspector	Cheon Deok-gu	First main role	
2019	Birthday Letter	Goo Gi-woong		
2020	The King: Eternal Monarch	Kang Shin-jae / Kang Hyeon-min		
2021	Revolutionary Sisters	Han Ye-seul		
2021–2022	The One and Only	Min Woo-cheon		
2024	Connection	Won Jong-soo		
2026	Phantom Lawyer	Yang Do-kyung		[16]

== Discography ==
=== Singles ===
Title	Year	Album
"Okidokiya (Rock Ver.)" 오키도키야 (Rock Ver.)	2021	Revolutionary Sisters OST Part 9

== Awards and nominations ==
Year	Award	Category	Nominated work	Result
2018	MBC Drama Awards	Best New Actor	Come and Hug Me	Won
2018	SBS Drama Awards	Best Supporting Actor	Where Stars Land	Nominated
2019	MBC Drama Awards	Excellence Award, Actor in a Monday-Tuesday Miniseries	Special Labor Inspector	Nominated
2019	MBC Drama Awards	Best One-minute Couple Award with Kim Dong-wook	Special Labor Inspector	Nominated
2021	KBS Drama Awards	Excellence Award, Actor in a Serial Drama	Revolutionary Sisters	Nominated
2022	8th APAN Star Awards	Excellence Award, Actor in a Serial Drama	Revolutionary Sisters	Nominated
