= Revolutionary Sisters =

2021 South Korean television series

- Promotional poster
- Hangul: 오케이 광자매
- Hanja: 오케이 光姊妹
- Lit.: Okay Photon Sisters
- RR: Okei Gwangjamae
- MR: Ok'ei Kwangjamae
- Genre: Family drama; Romance; Comedy drama; Thriller; Mystery
- Created by: Ki Min-Soo; Moon Jun-ha; KBS Drama Division
- Written by: Moon Young-nam
- Directed by: Lee Jin-seo
- Starring: Yoon Joo-sang; Hong Eun-hee; Jeon Hye-bin; Kim Kyung-nam; Go Won-hee; Lee Bo-hee; Lee Byung-joon; Choi Dae-chul
- Composers: Jang Young-kyu (CP); Hae-mi (CP)
- Country of origin: South Korea
- Original language: Korean
- No. of episodes: 50

Production
- Executive producers: Kang Byeong-taek (KBS); Choi Hee-seok (CP); Moon Seon-ho (CP)
- Producers: Lee Ho; Kim Hae-jung; Kim Sang-heon; Choi Jin-wook
- Editor: Lim Hyun Joon
- Camera setup: Single-camera
- Running time: 70 minutes
- Production companies: Chorokbaem Media; Pan Entertainment
- Budget: ₩20 billion

Original release
- Network: KBS2
- Release: March 13 – September 18, 2021

Revolutionary Sisters (Korean: 오케이 광자매) is a 2021 South Korean television series starring Yoon Joo-Sang, Hong Eun-Hee, Jeon Hye-bin, Kim Kyung-nam, Go Won-hee, and Lee Bo-hee. Directed by Lee Jin-seo, the weekend drama revolves around Lee sisters, who are suspected of murder of their mother during the divorce proceedings of their parents. It premiered on KBS2 on March 13, 2021, and aired every Saturday and Sunday from 19:55 (KST) till September 18.

The series ended on September 18 after 50 episodes. The 49th episode of the series aired on September 12, 2021, logged a national average viewership of 32.6% with 5.8 million viewers watching the episode, it placed the series at 7th rank among 'Top 50 series per nationwide viewers in Korea'.

== Synopsis ==
The series opens with the murder of a mother that is committed during the parent's divorce proceedings and all members of the Lee family and the extended family are suspected of murder. This series further tells the suspenseful but humorous story of the aftermath of the murder.

Lee Cheol-soo (Yoon Joo-sang) has three daughters, Lee Gwang-nam, Lee Gwang-sik and Lee Gwang-tae. He is a stickler for rules and principles. The daughters resent him. Lee Gwang-nam, the eldest, is proud, selfish and the apple of her mother's eyes. Her mother has suffered due to her father, so she dislikes him. Lee Gwang-sik, the second daughter is a public officer. She is smart, principled and considerate to others. Lee Gwang-tae, the youngest daughter, is good at martial arts and works part-time. She does not consider marriage an option.

Meanwhile, since Han Ye-seul was 12, he had dreamt of becoming a trot singer.After dropping out of high school, he came to Seoul to pursue his dream. He is hard-working, kind and righteous.

== Cast ==
=== Main ===
- Yoon Joo-sang as Lee Cheol-soo

65 years old, father of three daughters, Bong-ja's brother-in-law, Taeng-ja's brother-in-law, works to open the toilet sewage system

- Hong Eun-hee as Lee Gwang-nam

43 years old, first daughter, egoistic, vain and conceited, Lee Cheol-soo's first daughter, Gwang-sik and Gwang-tae's eldest sister

- Jeon Hye-bin as Lee Gwang-sik

34 years old, second daughter, smart and just, wise and considerate and an intelligent government employee

- Go Won-hee as Lee Gwang-tae

29 years old, youngest sister to Gwang-nam and Gwang-sik, 11th-degree black belts, cheerful and cool, a trend taker

- Kim Kyung-nam as Han Ye-seul

32 years old, a guitarist and an aspiring trot singer, Lee Gwang-sik's lover, a man with good morals and values, humorous, emotional and decent character

- Choi Dae-chul as Bae Byeon-ho

45 years old, Lee Gwang-nam's husband, a successful lawyer

- Lee Bo-hee as Oh Bong-ja

57 years old, aunt of three sisters, Cheol-soo's sister in law, Taeng-ja's older sister, owner of a one-room building

- Lee Byung-joon as Han Dol-se

72 years old, Han Ye-seul's father, junior from Lee park-soo's hometown

=== Supporting ===
- Kim Hye-sun as Oh Taeng-ja

55 years old, aunt of three sisters, Cheol-soo's sister-in-law, Bong-ja's sister

- Hong Je-yi as Oh Ttoo-gi,

7 years old, Taeng-ja's daughter

- Ha Jae-sook as Shin Maria

46 years old, owner of Bae Byeon-ho's regular restaurant

- Seol Jung-hwan as Heo Gi-jin

29 years old, Heo Poong-jin's brother

- Joo Suk-tae as Heo Poong-jin

38 years old, he has affection for his younger brother, Gi-jin, more than his parents

- Lee Sang-sook as deputy's mother, 65 years old
- Ho-seok as Yang Dae-chang, Han Ye-seul's friend and manager.
- Son Woo-hyeon as Na Pyeon-seung

29 years old, Gwang-sik's current husband, an elementary school classmate with Gwang-tae.

- Go Geon-han as Byun Sa-chae, 29 years old, Ki-jin's best friend
- Han Ji-wan as Min Deul-re
- Kim Na-yoon as Pyeon-seung's mother
- Song Young-jae as Pyeon-seung's father
- Seo Yoon-ah as Na Pyeon-seung's older sister
- Chun Yi-seul as Lee Tae-ri
- Park Sun-woo as Teacher Tak
- Ji Sung-won as Sang Gan-nam's wife
- Lee Ji-wan as Song Ah-reum
- Shin Cheol-jin as Grandfather
- Kim Ga-ran as Gwang-sik's colleague
- Park In-hwan
- Kim Jung-heon as Jin Jeong-han a guest at Lee Gwang-sik's restaurant
- Seo Do-jin as Hwang Chun-gil

=== Special appearance ===
- Baek Seung-hee as Bae Seul-cheo, wife of Han Ye-seul's older brother, Bae-seul
- Sam Hammington as himself
- William Hammington
- Bentley Hammington
- Kim Yi-seo as Togi's kindergarten teacher

== Production ==
=== Casting ===
With this series, Yoon Joo-sang is celebrating his 50th year of debut.

=== Filming ===
Stills from filming of Go Won-hee as the youngest sister were released in February 2021. On March 6, 2021, the production crew releasing pictures of cast from filming location commented, "In fact, the actors of the 'Revolutionary Sisters' are always caring for and caring for each other, making their filming more enjoyable and joyful than ever before." On April 13 filming was temporarily stopped due to self-quarantine of a cast member who came into close contact with a confirmed COVID-19 case. The subsequent airing of two episodes on April 17 and 18 were also postponed for April 24 and 25. (Note: The episodes on April 17 and April 18, 2021 were not aired due to self-quarantine of cast member who came in contact with a confirmed COVID-19 case. A special episode containing the story up to episode 20 was telecast on these dates.) The filming of the series ended in late August 2021.

== Original soundtrack ==
Revolutionary Sisters

Soundtrack album by Various
- Released: 2021
- Genre: Soundtrack
- Languages: Korean; English
- Labels: Vlending Co., Ltd.

=== Part 1 ===
Released on March 28, 2021
No.	Title	Lyrics	Music	Artist	Length
1.	"A Photonic Sister" (광자매 납신다)	Lee Nal-chi	Lee Nal-chi	Kwon Song-hee; Shin Yu-jin; Ahn Lee-ho; Na-rae	2:12

=== Part 2 ===
Released on April 24, 2021
No.	Title	Lyrics	Music	Artist	Length
1.	"Suspicion" (타이틀 의심)	Lee Nal-chi	Lee Nal-chi	This flying fish	3:07

=== Part 3 ===
Released on May 2, 2021
No.	Title	Lyrics	Music	Artist	Length
1.	"Propose"	Beomju Kim, Sihyuk Kim	Beomju Kim, Sihyuk Kim	Bernard Park	2:45
2.	"Proposal" (Inst.)		Beomju Kim, Sihyuk Kim		2:45

=== Part 4 ===
Released on May 9, 2021
No.	Title	Lyrics	Music	Artist	Length
1.	"My Heart Rushes" (마음이 스르륵 (채운))	Kyungyoung Yoon	Hmi	Chaewoon	3:07
2.	"My Heart Rushes" (Inst.)		Hmi		3:07

=== Part 5 ===
Released on June 12, 2021
No.	Title	Lyrics	Music	Artist	Length
1.	"Loving U" (좋아서 좋아해 츄 (이달의 소녀))	Yoon Kyung	Humi	Chuu (Loona)	2:51
2.	"Loving U" (Inst.)				2:51

=== Part 6 ===
Released on June 19, 2021
No.	Title	Lyrics	Music	Artist	Length
1.	"Sound of Farewell" (이별소리)	Museong, Playing Children (high seAson), Lim Ki-beom (high seAson)	Playing Children (high seAson), Lim Ki-beom (high seAson)	Lee Chang-min	4:09
2.	"Sound of Farewell" (Inst.)				4:09

=== Part 7 ===
Released on July 11, 2021
No.	Title	Lyrics	Music	Artist	Length
1.	"Okay" (오케이)	Young-tak, Ji Kwang-min	Jeongyoung Kwak, Jeongsu Hong, Jaegyu Lee	Young Tak	3:10
2.	"I will go to you" (너에게 갈게)	Lim Han, Jungsu Hong	Han Lim	Han Lim
3.	"Okay" (Inst.)	3:10	Jeongyoung Kwak, Jeongsu Hong, Jaegyu Lee
4.	"I will go to you" (Inst.)		Han Lim

=== Part 8 ===
Released on July 31, 2021
No.	Title	Lyrics	Music	Artist	Length
1.	"Okidokiya" (오키도키야)	Algoboni, Honsu Sang-tae	Algoboni, Honsu Sang-tae	Jin-seong	2:30
2.	"Okidokiya" (Inst.)				2:30

=== Part 9 ===
Released on August 22, 2021
No.	Title	Lyrics	Music	Artist	Length
1.	"Okidokiya (Rock Ver.)" (오키도키야 (Rock Ver.))	ALGOBONI HONSUSANGTAE	ALGOBONI HONSUSANGTAE	Kim Kyung-nam	2:24
2.	"Okidokiya (Rock Ver.)" (Inst.)				2:24

== Viewership ==
Audience response

As per Nielsen Korea, the 49th episode aired on September 12, 2021, logged a national average viewership of 32.6% with 5.8 million viewers watching the episode, thereby breaking its own highest ratings. It also takes the series at 7th place among 'Top 50 series per nationwide viewers in Korea'.

Revolutionary Sisters : South Korea viewers per episode (millions)

Episodes	Episode number									
Episodes	1	2	3	4	5	6	7	8	9	10
Ep.1-10	4.001	4.357	4.204	4.726	4.629	4.687	4.235	4.542	4.259	4.591
Ep.11-20	4.107	4.497	4.456	4.633	4.410	5.210	5.036	5.487	4.754	5.134
Ep.21-30	4.770	5.232	4.376	5.127	4.854	5.304	4.697	5.275	4.932	5.617
Ep.31-40	4.777	5.363	4.435	4.719	4.664	5.354	3.552	4.213	5.333	4.666
Ep.41-50	5.359	5.156	5.530	4.907	5.569	5.001	5.432	5.127	5.823	5.105

Source: Audience measurement performed nationwide by Nielsen Korea.

Ep.	Part	Original broadcast date	Average audience share		
Ep.	Part	Original broadcast date	Nielsen Korea		TNmS
Ep.	Part	Original broadcast date	Nationwide	Seoul	Nationwide
1	1	March 13, 2021	20.3% (3rd)	19.8% (4th)	17.7% (4th)
1	2	March 13, 2021	23.5% (2nd)	22.0% (2nd)	20.6% (2nd)
2	1	March 14, 2021	23.4% (2nd)	22.8% (2nd)	21.9% (2nd)
2	2	March 14, 2021	26.0% (1st)	25.1% (1st)	23.7% (1st)
3	1	March 20, 2021	21.1% (3rd)	20.3% (4th)	18.9% (3rd)
3	2	March 20, 2021	25.0% (2nd)	23.7% (2nd)	22.0% (2nd)
4	1	March 21, 2021	24.4% (2nd)	22.4% (2nd)	21.5% (2nd)
4	2	March 21, 2021	27.2% (1st)	25.5% (1st)	23.8% (1st)
5	1	March 27, 2021	22.2% (4th)	20.6% (4th)	19.0% (4th)
5	2	March 27, 2021	26.7% (2nd)	25.4% (2nd)	22.0% (2nd)
6	1	March 28, 2021	24.5% (2nd)	23.2% (2nd)	21.2% (2nd)
6	2	March 28, 2021	26.9% (1st)	25.7% (1st)	23.4% (1st)
7	1	April 3, 2021	21.6% (2nd)	20.1% (2nd)	—N/a
7	2	April 3, 2021	25.1% (1st)	23.6% (1st)	—N/a
8	1	April 4, 2021	25.4% (2nd)	23.6% (2nd)	22.4% (2nd)
8	2	April 4, 2021	26.8% (1st)	24.7% (1st)	24.7% (1st)
9	1	April 10, 2021	20.0% (2nd)	18.1% (2nd)	18.4% (2nd)
9	2	April 10, 2021	25.2% (1st)	23.2% (1st)	22.4% (1st)
10	1	April 11, 2021	23.6% (2nd)	21.1% (2nd)	22.1% (2nd)
10	2	April 11, 2021	26.3% (1st)	24.0% (1st)	24.7% (1st)
11	1	April 24, 2021	21.2% (2nd)	19.3% (2nd)	19.2% (2nd)
11	2	April 24, 2021	25.4% (1st)	23.4% (1st)	22.6% (1st)
12	1	April 25, 2021	24.2% (2nd)	22.6% (2nd)	21.4% (2nd)
12	2	April 25, 2021	27.7% (1st)	26.1% (1st)	24.9% (1st)
13	1	May 1, 2021	22.8% (2nd)	21.5% (2nd)	19.3% (2nd)
13	2	May 1, 2021	26.7% (1st)	24.9% (1st)	23.0% (1st)
14	1	May 2, 2021	24.7% (2nd)	24.0% (2nd)	22.2% (2nd)
14	2	May 2, 2021	28.1% (1st)	27.4% (1st)	24.7% (1st)
15	1	May 8, 2021	20.2% (2nd)	19.4% (2nd)	18.1% (2nd)
15	2	May 8, 2021	25.9% (1st)	24.5% (1st)	22.7% (1st)
16	1	May 9, 2021	26.2% (2nd)	24.4% (2nd)	22.0% (2nd)
16	2	May 9, 2021	30.2% (1st)	28.3% (1st)	25.7% (1st)
17	1	May 15, 2021	24.6% (2nd)	22.9% (2nd)	—N/a
17	2	May 15, 2021	29.1% (1st)	27.6% (1st)	—N/a
18	1	May 16, 2021	28.9% (2nd)	27.3% (2nd)	25.1% (2nd)
18	2	May 16, 2021	31.8% (1st)	30.7% (1st)	27.4% (1st)
19	1	May 22, 2021	23.2% (2nd)	22.2% (2nd)	20.3% (2nd)
19	2	May 22, 2021	27.7% (1st)	26.4% (1st)	25.1% (1st)
20	1	May 23, 2021	27.6% (2nd)	25.9% (2nd)	25.0% (2nd)
20	2	May 23, 2021	30.9% (1st)	29.1% (1st)	28.6% (1st)
21	1	May 29, 2021	25.0% (2nd)	24.5% (2nd)	20.8% (2nd)
21	2	May 29, 2021	28.8% (1st)	28.0% (1st)	25.1% (1st)
22	1	May 30, 2021	27.5% (2nd)	26.4% (2nd)	24.5% (2nd)
22	2	May 30, 2021	30.5% (1st)	29.0% (1st)	28.4% (1st)
23	1	June 5, 2021	21.5% (2nd)	20.5% (2nd)	—N/a
23	2	June 5, 2021	26.7% (1st)	25.7% (1st)	—N/a
24	1	June 6, 2021	26.5% (2nd)	24.7% (2nd)	22.1% (1st)
24	2	June 6, 2021	30.4% (1st)	28.7% (1st)	26.6% (1st)
25	1	June 12, 2021	23.2% (2nd)	21.3% (2nd)	19.3% (2nd)
25	2	June 12, 2021	28.9% (1st)	26.6% (1st)	25.2% (1st)
26	1	June 13, 2021	28.4% (2nd)	27.1% (2nd)	24.9% (2nd)
26	2	June 13, 2021	31.5% (1st)	30.3% (1st)	28.1% (1st)
27	1	June 19, 2021	23.4% (2nd)	21.9% (2nd)	—N/a
27	2	June 19, 2021	28.6% (1st)	26.8% (1st)	—N/a
28	1	June 20, 2021	29.0% (2nd)	27.6% (2nd)	22.7% (2nd)
28	2	June 20, 2021	31.5% (1st)	29.3% (1st)	25.5% (1st)
29	1	June 26, 2021	24.2% (2nd)	22.7% (2nd)	—N/a
29	2	June 26, 2021	29.5% (1st)	27.6% (1st)	—N/a
30	1	June 27, 2021	29.6% (2nd)	28.3% (2nd)	24.5% (2nd)
30	2	June 27, 2021	32.5% (1st)	30.7% (1st)	27.2% (1st)
31		July 3, 2021	27.9% (1st)	26.9% (1st)	—N/a
32		July 4, 2021	31.9% (1st)	31.6% (1st)	27.0% (1st)
33		July 10, 2021	27.0% (1st)	25.9% (1st)	—N/a
34		July 11, 2021	30.3% (1st)	29.1% (1st)	26.7% (1st)
35		July 17, 2021	27.5% (1st)	26.0% (1st)	—N/a
36		July 18, 2021	30.1% (1st)	28.6% (1st)	26.9% (1st)
37		July 25, 2021 (Note: The episodes of the series will not be aired twice on Saturday, the 24th and 31st. These will be aired on Sunday, the 25th after the 2020 Summer Olympics broadcast ends at 22.00 KST.)	20.0% (1st)	19.4% (1st)	14.7% (1st)
38		August 7, 2021 (Note: The broadcast, which was cancelled due to 2020 Summer Olympics, is resuming on August 7.)	24.3% (1st)	23.7% (1st)	19.6% (1st)
39		August 8, 2021	30.4% (1st)	29.6% (1st)	24.3% (1st)
40		August 14, 2021	28.2% (1st)	27.2% (1st)	23.6% (1st)
41		August 15, 2021	30.1% (1st)	28.4% (1st)	26.6% (1st)
42		August 21, 2021	29.8% (1st)	28.8% (1st)	26.0% (1st)
43		August 22, 2021	31.0% (1st)	29.9% (1st)	26.5% (1st)
44		August 28, 2021	28.9% (1st)	28.1% (1st)	23.6% (1st)
45		August 29, 2021	32.5% (1st)	31.6% (1st)	27.6% (1st)
46		September 4, 2021	28.6% (1st)	27.2% (1st)	25.2% (1st)
47		September 5, 2021	31.4% (1st)	29.8% (1st)	27.0% (1st)
48		September 11, 2021	29.1% (1st)	27.4% (1st)	24.5% (1st)
49		September 12, 2021	32.6% (1st)	31.1% (1st)	28.2% (1st)
50		September 18, 2021	28.9% (1st)	27.9% (1st)	24.9% (1st)
Average			26.88%	25.46%	—
Special episode	Part 1	April 17, 2021	14.2% (2nd)	13.0% (2nd)	13.0% (2nd)
Special episode	Part 2	April 17, 2021	13.1% (3rd)	12.4% (3rd)	11.3% (4th)
Special episode 2	Part 1	April 18, 2021	11.5% (4th)	10.1% (6th)	11.1% (4th)
Special episode 2	Part 2	April 18, 2021	10.9% (6th)	9.7% (7th)	10.9% (5th)
In this table, the blue numbers represent the lowest ratings and the red numbers represent the highest ratings.; N/A denotes that the rating is not known.

== Home media ==
The series was made available for streaming globally on Netflix from August 19, 2022.

== Awards and nominations ==
Date	Award Ceremony	Category	Recipient	Result	Ref.
21 October 2021	16th Seoul International Drama Awards	Excellent Korean Drama OST	Young Tak for "Okay" (오케이)	Won	
December 31, 2021	KBS Drama Awards	Excellence Award, Actor in a Serial Drama	Yoon Joo-sang	Won	
December 31, 2021	KBS Drama Awards	Excellence Award, Actor in a Serial Drama	Kim Kyung-nam	Nominated	
December 31, 2021	KBS Drama Awards	Excellence Award, Actress in a Serial Drama	Hong Eun-hee	Won	
December 31, 2021	KBS Drama Awards	Excellence Award, Actress in a Serial Drama	Jeon Hye-bin	Nominated	
December 31, 2021	KBS Drama Awards	Best Supporting Actor	Choi Dae-chul	Won	
December 31, 2021	KBS Drama Awards	Top Excellence Award, Actor	Yoon Joo-sang	Nominated	
December 31, 2021	KBS Drama Awards	Top Excellence Award, Actress	Hong Eun-hee	Nominated	
December 31, 2021	KBS Drama Awards	Best Young Actress	Hong Je-yi	Nominated	
September 29, 2022	APAN Star Awards	Excellence Award, Actor in a Serial Drama	Kim Kyung-nam	Nominated	
