= Bad Prosecutor =

2022 South Korean television series

- Promotional poster
- Hangul: 진검승부
- Hanja: 真劍勝負
- Lit.: True Sword Battle
- RR: Jingeomseungbu
- MR: Chin'gŏmsŭngbu
- Genre: Legal drama
- Screenplay by: Im Young-bin
- Directed by: Kim Seong-ho; Choi Yeon-soo
- Starring: Doh Kyung-soo; Lee Se-hee
- Music by: Baek Eun-woo
- Country of origin: South Korea
- Original language: Korean
- No. of episodes: 12

Production
- Executive producer: Yoon Jae-hyuk (KBS)
- Producers: Lee Hyang-bong; Bae Ik-hyun; Seo Ho-jin
- Running time: 75 minutes
- Production companies: Neo Entertainment; Blaad Studios

Original release
- Network: KBS2
- Release: October 5 – November 10, 2022

Bad Prosecutor (Korean: 진검승부) is a South Korean television series starring Doh Kyung-soo and Lee Se-hee. It depicts the story of a prosecutor who truly punishes corrupt powers with expedience and trickery. The series aired on KBS2 from October 5 to November 10, 2022, every Wednesday and Thursday at 21:50 (KST) for 12 episodes.

== Synopsis ==
Bad Prosecutor is a story about a prosecutor named Jin Jung (Doh Kyung-soo), armed with badness and grittiness, breaking the sanctuary created by wealth and power. He chooses expediency over the law, tricks over standards, and defect over sincerity. He will provide a sense of exhilaration by punishing corrupt officials who are eating away at this society.

== Cast ==
=== Main ===
- Do Kyung-soo as Jin Jung
  - Jung Hyeon-jun as young Jin Jung

A prosecutor in the third division of the Central District Prosecutors' Office who stands on the side of the underprivileged.

- Lee Se-hee as Shin A-ra

A senior prosecutor at the Central District Prosecutors' Office with perfect work skills and social skills.

- Ha Jun as Oh Do-hwan

A prosecutor at the Central District Prosecutors' Office.

=== Supporting ===
==== People related to Jin Jung ====
- Lee Si-eon as Go Joong-do

A hacker with obscure skills who works with Jin Jung.

- Kim Sang-ho as Park Jae-kyung

The head of the Civil Service Office of the Central District Prosecutors' Office.

- Yeon Joon-seok as Lee Chul-ki

Jin Jung's loyal and reliable detective.

- Joo Bo-young as Baek Eun-ji

Daughter of the head of National Organization – White Gompa.

==== People related to the Central District Prosecutor's Office ====
- Kim Tae-woo as Kim Tae-ho

The Chief Prosecutor of the crime department.

- Choi Kwang-il as Lee Jang-won

Deputy Chief Prosecutor of the Central Prosecutor's Office.

- Yoon Jung-seop as Investigator Park

He is a veteran who worked with Shin A-ra.

- Hong Eui-jun as Investigator Kang Shin-jo

Oh Do-hwan's loyal right arm.

==== People related to Kangsan Law Firm ====
- Kim Chang-wan as Seo Hyun-gyu

Representative of Kangsan Law Firm and the primary antagonist of the series.

- Yoo Hwan as Seo Ji-han

Son of Seo Hyun-gyu. Heir to Kangsan Law Firm and a culprit of the murder that leads to the event of the series.

- Kim Hieora as Director Tae Hyung-wook

Seo Hyun-gyu's bodyguard and personal secretary.

- Kim Jung-young as Jang Jae-Hee

A professor and Jin Jung's senior in university.

==== Others ====
- Kim Geun-soon as Jin Jung's mother

She has a cool personality, and owns a restaurant.

- Shin Seung-hwan as Yoo Jin-cheol

A gangster who runs an entertainment establishment in Gangnam.

- Jeong Jae-won as Min-goo

The third person in the national organization White Gompa.

=== Extended ===
- Lee Hyo-na as Park Ye-young

The victim of the Seo Cho-dong murder case.

- Lee Woo-sung as Kim Hyo-jun

A delivery man who has been identified as the culprit in the Seo Cho-dong murder case.

=== Special appearance ===
- Lee Jong-hyuk as Jin Kang-woo

Jin Jung's father and reporter.

- Keum Kwang-san as Fitness president

== Production ==
On October 28, 2022, it was reported that filming would end on October 31.

== Original soundtrack ==
Bad Prosecutor (Original Television Soundtrack)

Soundtrack album by Various Artists
- Released: November 17, 2022
- Genre: Soundtrack
- Length: 77:44
- Languages: Korean; English
- Labels: PRISMFILTER Music Group; Warner
- Producer: PRISMFILTER

The soundtrack album peaked on number 37 on weekly Circle Album Chart. As of December 2022, 3,400 copies have been sold.

Disc 1
| No. | Title | Artist | Length |
|---|---|---|---|
| 1. | "Deep End" | twlv | 3:11 |
| 2. | "Little Star" (작은 별) | Lucy | 3:13 |
| 3. | "Bite" | D.O. (Exo) | 3:22 |
| 4. | "Call me a freak" | Suho (Exo) | 2:51 |
| 5. | "Bad Prosecutor" (진검승부) | Layone | 2:49 |
| 6. | "Bitter" (쓰다) | Han Dong-geun | 3:54 |
| 7. | "Believe" | Chuther | 3:11 |
| 8. | "Deep End" (Inst.) | twlv | 3:11 |
| 9. | "Little Star" (Inst.) | Lucy | 3:13 |
| 10. | "Bite" (Inst.) | D.O. (Exo) | 3:22 |
| 11. | "Call me a freak" (Inst.) | Suho (Exo) | 2:51 |
| 12. | "Bad Prosecutor" (Inst.) | Layone | 2:49 |
| 13. | "Bitter" (Inst.) | Han Dong-geun | 3:54 |
| 14. | "Believe" (Inst.) | Chuther | 3:11 |
| Total length: | | | 45:02 |

Disc 2
| No. | Title | Artist | Length |
|---|---|---|---|
| 1. | "Go Jin-jeong" | Baek Eun-woo; Park Beom-geun; Ji Sung-kyu | 2:02 |
| 2. | "Detective Comic" | Baek Eun-woo; Yang Sung-ho | 2:22 |
| 3. | "Agent" | Baek Eun-woo; Park Beom-geun | 2:01 |
| 4. | "Real Fight" | Oh Byeong-joo | 2:05 |
| 5. | "Extreme Hip-hop" | Baek Eun-woo; Kim Tae-joon | 2:47 |
| 6. | "Freestyle" | Baek Eun-woo; Yang Sung-ho | 3:18 |
| 7. | "Airport Chase" | Oh Byeong-joo | 1:47 |
| 8. | "Funny Rock" | Baek Eun-woo; Kim Tae-joon | 2:40 |
| 9. | "War against Evil" | Oh Byeong-joo | 2:56 |
| 10. | "Smash" | Baek Eun-woo; Park Beom-geun; Kim Dae-hoon | 2:00 |
| 11. | "Wrong Judgement" | Baek Eun-woo; Yang Sung-ho | 2:03 |
| 12. | "Real Prosecutor" | Baek Eun-woo; Yang Sung-ho | 2:05 |
| 13. | "Amigo" | Baek Eun-woo; Park Beom-geun; Kim Soo-bin | 2:01 |
| 14. | "Here to the End" | Baek Eun-woo; Park Beom-geun; Kim Soo-bin | 2:25 |
| Total length: | | | 32:32 |

Original Soundtrack Parts 1–7

=== Part 1 ===
Released on October 6, 2022
| No. | Title | Lyrics | Music | Artist | Length |
|---|---|---|---|---|---|
| 1. | "Deep End" | Kim Hye-jeong | Jozu; Ohway! | twlv | 3:11 |
| 2. | "Deep End" (Inst.) | | Jozu; Ohway! | | 3:11 |
| Total length: | | | | | 6:22 |

=== Part 2 ===
Released on October 13, 2022
| No. | Title | Lyrics | Music | Artist | Length |
|---|---|---|---|---|---|
| 1. | "Little Star" (작은 별) | Nmore; Jozu; Jeon Jeni | Nmore; Jozu; Jeon Jeni | Lucy | 3:13 |
| 2. | "Little Star" (Inst.) | | Nmore; Jozu; Jeon Jeni | | 3:13 |
| Total length: | | | | | 6:26 |

=== Part 3 ===
Released on October 19, 2022
| No. | Title | Lyrics | Music | Artist | Length |
|---|---|---|---|---|---|
| 1. | "Bite" | Kim Hye-jeong | HeyFarmer; GESTURE | D.O. (Exo) | 3:22 |
| 2. | "Bite" (Inst.) | | HeyFarmer; GESTURE | | 3:22 |
| Total length: | | | | | 6:44 |

=== Part 4 ===
Released on October 27, 2022
| No. | Title | Lyrics | Music | Artist | Length |
|---|---|---|---|---|---|
| 1. | "Call me a freak" | Jozu; Building Owner; GESTURE | Jozu; Building Owner; Kim Seung-jun; GESTURE | Suho (Exo) | 2:51 |
| 2. | "Call me a freak" (Inst.) | | Jozu; Building Owner; Kim Seung-jun; GESTURE | | 2:51 |
| Total length: | | | | | 5:42 |

=== Part 5 ===
Released on November 3, 2022
| No. | Title | Lyrics | Music | Artist | Length |
|---|---|---|---|---|---|
| 1. | "Bad Prosecutor" (진검승부) | Layone | Layone; Baek Eun-woo; Kim Tae-joon | Layone | 2:49 |
| 2. | "Bad Prosecutor" (Inst.) | | Layone; Baek Eun-woo; Kim Tae-joon | | 2:49 |
| Total length: | | | | | 5:38 |

=== Part 6 ===
Released on November 9, 2022
| No. | Title | Lyrics | Music | Artist | Length |
|---|---|---|---|---|---|
| 1. | "Bitter" (쓰다) | Kim Sa-ra; Kim Hye-jeong | Kwon Tae-eun | Han Dong-geun | 3:54 |
| 2. | "Bitter" (Inst.) | | Kwon Tae-eun | | 3:54 |
| Total length: | | | | | 7:48 |

=== Part 7 ===
Released on November 10, 2022
| No. | Title | Lyrics | Music | Artist | Length |
|---|---|---|---|---|---|
| 1. | "Believe" | Shannon | Ohway!; Shannon | Chuther | 3:11 |
| 2. | "Believe" (Inst.) | | Ohway!; Shannon | | 3:11 |
| Total length: | | | | | 6:22 |

== Viewership ==
Bad Prosecutor : South Korea viewers per episode (thousands)

| Season | Episode number | | | | | | | | | | | | Average |
| Season | 1 | 2 | 3 | 4 | 5 | 6 | 7 | 8 | 9 | 10 | 11 | 12 | Average |
|---|---|---|---|---|---|---|---|---|---|---|---|---|---|
| 1 | 773 | 876 | 834 | 911 | 774 | 932 | 893 | 1005 | 1093 | 1060 | 795 | 1158 | 925 |

Source: Audience measurement performed nationwide by Nielsen Korea.

Average TV viewership ratings
| Ep. | Original broadcast date | Average audience share | | |
| Ep. | Original broadcast date | Nielsen Korea | | TNmS |
| Ep. | Original broadcast date | Nationwide | Seoul | Nationwide |
|---|---|---|---|---|
| 1 | October 5, 2022 | 4.3% (15th) | 4.1% (15th) | 4.6% (15th) |
| 2 | October 6, 2022 | 5.0% (9th) | 4.8% (9th) | 5.1% (11th) |
| 3 | October 12, 2022 | 4.6% (12th) | 4.3% (14th) | 4.3% (15th) |
| 4 | October 13, 2022 | 5.0% (11th) | 4.7% (13th) | 4.9% (13th) |
| 5 | October 19, 2022 | 4.3% (14th) | 4.1% (13th) | 3.9% (16th) |
| 6 | October 20, 2022 | 5.1% (11th) | 4.8% (10th) | 4.3% (13th) |
| 7 | October 26, 2022 | 5.0% (14th) | 5.2% (8th) | 4.1% (17th) |
| 8 | October 27, 2022 | 5.6% (11th) | 5.7% (8th) | 4.8% (12th) |
| 9 | November 2, 2022 | 6.3% (6th) | 6.7% (6th) | 5.0% (13th) |
| 10 | November 3, 2022 | 6.2% (8th) | 6.0% (6th) | 5.2% (12th) |
| 11 | November 9, 2022 | 4.7% (12th) | 4.5% (13th) | 4.1% (16th) |
| 12 | November 10, 2022 | 6.3% (6th) | 5.9% (7th) | 4.9% (12th) |
| Average | | 5.2% | 5.1% | 4.6% |
In the table above, the blue numbers represent the lowest ratings and the red numbers represent the highest ratings.

== Accolades ==
Name of the award ceremony, year presented, category, nominee of the award, and the result of the nomination
| Award ceremony | Year | Category | Nominee / Work | Result | Ref. |
|---|---|---|---|---|---|
| Director's Cut Awards | 2023 | Best New Actress in Television | Kim Hieora | Nominated | |
