= 2019 MBC Drama Awards =

38th edition of award ceremony

- Date: December 30, 2019
- Site: MBC Media Center Public Hall, Sangam-dong, Mapo-gu, Seoul
- Hosted by: Main: Kim Sung-joo; Han Hye-jin

Highlights
- Best Drama Serial: Extraordinary You
- Grand Prize (Daesang): Kim Dong-wook – Special Labor Inspector

Television coverage
- Network: MBC
- Duration: TBA

The 2019 MBC Drama Awards, presented by Munhwa Broadcasting Corporation (MBC) took place on December 30, 2019. It was hosted by Kim Sung-joo and Han Hye-jin.

== Winners and nominees ==
- Winners denoted in **bold**.

Grand Prize (Daesang)	Drama of the Year
**Kim Dong-wook** – **Special Labor Inspector**; Han Ji-min – One Spring Night; Jung Hae-in – One Spring Night; Lee Sang-woo – The Golden Garden; Lim Ji-yeon – Welcome 2 Life; Shin Se-kyung – Rookie Historian Goo Hae-ryung; Ye Ji-won – Never Twice	**Extraordinary You**; One Spring Night; Partners for Justice 2; Rookie Historian Goo Hae-ryung; Special Labor Inspector
Top Excellence Award, Actor in a Monday-Tuesday Miniseries	Top Excellence Award, Actress in a Monday-Tuesday Miniseries
**Kim Dong-wook** – **Special Labor Inspector**; Ju Ji-hoon – Item; Jung Ji-hoon – Welcome 2 Life; Jung Jae-young – Partners for Justice 2; Yoo Ji-tae – Different Dreams	**Lim Ji-yeon** – **Welcome 2 Life**; Lee Yo-won – Different Dreams; Jin Se-yeon – Item; Jeong Yu-mi – Partners for Justice 2
Top Excellence Award, Actor in a Wednesday-Thursday Miniseries	Top Excellence Award, Actress in a Wednesday-Thursday Miniseries
**Jung Hae-in** – **One Spring Night**; Lee Jong-hyuk – Spring Turns to Spring; Kim Sang-joong – The Banker; Ahn Jae-hyun – Love with Flaws	**Shin Se-kyung** – **Rookie Historian Goo Hae-ryung**; **Han Ji-min** – **One Spring Night**; Oh Yeon-seo – Love with Flaws; Uhm Ji-won – Spring Turns to Spring; Lee Yoo-ri – Spring Turns to Spring; Chae Shi-ra – The Banker
Top Excellence Award, Actor in a Weekend Drama	Top Excellence Award, Actress in a Weekend Drama
**Lee Sang-woo** – **The Golden Garden**; Ji Hyun-woo – Love in Sadness; Jae Hee – Blessing of the Sea; Kim Ho-jin – Everybody Say Kungdari; Oh Ji-ho – Never Twice	**Ye Ji-won** – **Never Twice**; Han Ji-hye – The Golden Garden; Lee So-yeon – Blessing of the Sea; Park Si-eun – Everybody Say Kungdari
Excellence Award, Actor in a Monday-Tuesday Miniseries	Excellence Award, Actress in a Monday-Tuesday Miniseries
**Oh Man-seok** – **Partners for Justice**; Kim Kyung-nam – Special Labor Inspector; Kwak Si-yang – Welcome 2 Life; Lim Ju-hwan – Different Dreams; Park Won-sang – Item	**Park Se-young** – **Special Labor Inspector**; Kim Yoo-ri – Item; Nam Gyu-ri – Different Dreams; Jang So-yeon – Welcome 2 Life
Excellence Award, Actor in a Wednesday-Thursday Miniseries	Excellence Award, Actress in a Wednesday-Thursday Miniseries
**Cha Eun-woo** – **Rookie Historian Goo Hae-ryung**; Kim Jun-han – One Spring Night; Kim Tae-woo – The Banker; Park Ki-woong – Rookie Historian Goo Hae-ryung	**Kim Hye-yoon** – **Extraordinary You**; Kim Seul-gi – Love with Flaws; Park Ji-hyun – Rookie Historian Goo Hae-ryung; Seo Yi-sook – The Banker
Excellence Award, Actor in a Weekend/Daily Drama	Excellence Award, Actress in a Weekend/Daily Drama
**Ryu Soo-young** – **Love in Sadness**; Kang Suk-jung – Everybody Say Kungdari; Kim Hyung-min – Blessing of the Sea; Kwak Dong-yeon – Never Twice; Lee Tae-sung – The Golden Garden	**Park Se-wan** – **Never Twice**; Jo An – Blessing of the Sea; Lee Bo-hee – Everybody Say Kungdari; Oh Ji-eun – The Golden Garden
Best Supporting Cast in Monday-Tuesday Miniseries	Best Supporting Cast in a Wednesday-Thursday Miniseries
**Oh Dae-hwan** – **Special Labor Inspector**; Lee Hae-yong – Different Dreams; Ko Kyu-pil – Partners for Justice 2; Seol In-ah – Special Labor Inspector; Son Byong-ho – Welcome 2 Life	**Lee Ji-hoon** – **Rookie Historian Goo Hae-ryung**; Lee Tae-ri – Extraordinary You; Lee Sang-hee – One Spring Night; Shin Do-hyun – The Banker, Love with Flaws; Kim Min-kyung – Spring Turns to Spring
Best Supporting Cast in a Weekend/Daily Drama	Scene Stealer Award
**Jung Si-ah** – **The Golden Garden**; Ahn Nae-sang – Blessing of the Sea; Han Jin-hee – Never Twice; Wang Bit-na – Love in Sadness	**No Min-woo** – **Partners for Justice 2**; Jung Young-joo – The Golden Garden; Kim Kwang-kyu – Spring Turns to Spring; Song Ok-sook – Special Labor Inspector
Best New Actor	Best New Actress
**Rowoon** – **Extraordinary You**; **Lee Jae-wook** – **Extraordinary You**; Jung Gun-joo – Extraordinary You; Kim Young-dae – Extraordinary You	**Kim Hye-yoon** – **Extraordinary You**; Lee Na-eun – Extraordinary You; Kang Seung-hyun – Partners for Justice 2; Park Shin-ah – Welcome 2 Life
Best Young Actor/Actress	Best One-minute Couple Award
**Lee Soo-ah** – **Welcome 2 Life**	**Cha Eun-woo** and **Shin Se-kyung** – **Rookie Historian Goo Hae-ryung**; Jung Hae-in and Han Ji-min – One Spring Night; Kim Dong-wook and Kim Kyung-nam – Special Labor Inspector; No Min-woo and Jung Jae-young – Partners for Justice 2; Jung Ji-hoon and Lim Ji-yeon – Welcome 2 Life; Rowoon, Kim Hye-yoon and Lee Jae-wook – Extraordinary You
Writer of the Year
**Kim Ban-di** – **Special Labor Inspector**

== Presenters ==
Order	Presenter	Award
1	Lee Seol, Lee Jun-young	Best New Actor/Actress
2	Lim Ji-yeon	Best Young Actor/Actress
3	Kang Ki-young, Kim Jae-kyung	Best Supporting Cast
4	Kim Kyung-nam, Park Ji-hyun	Writer of the Year
5	Hong Yoon-hwa, Hong Hyun-hee	Best One-minute Couple Award
5	Kim Hyun-jung	Drama of the Year
6	Jung Sang-hoon, Kang Seung-hyun	Excellence Award in a Weekend/Daily Drama
7	Kim Dong-wook, Moon Ga-young	Excellence Award in a Monday-Tuesday Drama
8	Jang Ki-yong, Jo Bo-ah	Excellence Award in a Wednesday-Thursday Drama
9	Song Ga-in	Scene Stealer Award
10	Ryu Soo-young, Lee Yoo-ri	Top Excellence Award in a Weekend/Daily Drama
11	Ok Taec-yeon, Lee Yeon-hee	Top Excellence Award in a Monday-Tuesday Drama
12	Michael Lee, Kim Sun-a	Top Excellence Award in a Wednesday-Thursday Drama
13	Choi Seung-ho, So Ji-sub	Grand Prize (Daesang)

== Special performances ==
Order	Artist	Song
1	April	"Feeling" (Extraordinary You OST)
2	Choi Woo-ri	"Abandoned in Dawn" (여명 속에 버려진) (Eyes of Dawn Musical Medley)
2	Choi Woo-ri and Tei	"Chapter 1 Finale" (Eyes of Dawn Musical Medley)
2	Michael Lee	"I Hope You're Happy" (행복하길) (Eyes of Dawn Musical Medley)
2	Choi Woo-ri, Tei, and Michael Lee	"FINALE" (Eyes of Dawn Musical Medley)
3	Song Ga-in	"Moon of Seoul" (서울의 달)

== See also ==
- 2019 KBS Drama Awards
- 2019 SBS Drama Awards
