= Cho Doo-soon case =

2008 South Korean child rape incident

The Cho Doo-soon case (Korean: 조두순 사건) refers to a December 2008 assault that took place in Ansan, South Korea. An eight-year-old girl known by the pseudonym Na-young (나영) was kidnapped and raped by Cho Doo-soon, a 56-year-old male, in a bathroom inside a church. She was seriously injured in the attack. Cho was sentenced to 12 years in prison, and appealed on the grounds that the sentence was harsh, but his appeals were rejected. The sentence was later reduced because Cho was an alcoholic and his mental and physical weakness was recognized. The case sparked outrage and protests involving Na-young's parents and many others.

== Perpetrator ==
- Cho Doo-soon
- Hangul: 조두순
- RR: Jo Dusun
- MR: Cho Tusun

Cho Doo-soon (조두순) was born on October 18, 1952. He dropped out of middle school and in 1970, he committed his first crime, stealing a bicycle. He was given leniency because of his young age and because it was a small-scale crime. In 1972, he was sentenced to 1 year and 6 months in a youth detention center for extorting money from a street stall. In 1977, he was sentenced to 8 months in prison for habitual theft. In 1983, at age 31, he raped a 19-year-old girl who worked nearby where he lived; she needed 30 days of treatment to recover. He was sentenced to 3 years in prison for this crime. After his release, he was fined several times for various violent crimes, including the assault of a bar hostess. In 1995, while drinking, Cho assaulted a man in his 60s to death, because he praised controversial president Chun Doo-hwan. As he was deemed feeble-minded, he was sentenced to 2 years and admitted into a psychiatric hospital. Cho's only family is his wife, who has nothing but praise for him. Cho's wife said "Cooking rice and side dishes, cleaning the home and all the household work ... My husband has done it for 20 years ... He has never vented his anger and he has been hailed as a polite person." While married, Cho committed 11 out of his 18 total crimes. For most of his crimes he was drunk and gave the excuse that he "does not remember"; Cho's wife said that he only committed crimes because of alcohol.

== Course of events ==
On December 11, 2008, eight-year-old girl and elementary school student Kim Na-young was on her way to school when she was kidnapped by 56-year-old Cho Doo-soon, who was allegedly drunk at the time. He dragged her to a church's bathroom, saying she had to go to church. Cho struck her in the face several times, bit her cheek, strangled and held her head underwater until she fainted before sexually assaulting her. He left her on the floor with cold water running and left the scene. Na-young was found by her neighbors and was taken to hospital. She had multiple internal organ injuries but survived. Cho left evidence at the scene and still had her blood on himself when he was arrested. He inflicted permanent and non-bone injuries of traumatic cuts in the abdomen, lower abdomen and pelvis that required at least 8 months of treatment on the victim.

== Trial and controversy ==
Cho was originally sentenced to life imprisonment, but after Na-young testified that his breath smelled a little like alcohol, his sentence was reduced to 12 years in prison, as he was not sound of mind while committing the crime. Cho wrote over 300 times, "I am not the type of a sick monster who rapes an 8-year-old girl," to the judge. Na-young's parents filed a lawsuit against the prosecution for subjecting their daughter to physical and psychological distress. The prosecution questioned her right after she came out of surgery and made her sit upright and answer the same questions four times due to the prosecutors making mistakes while recording. They violated protocol in obtaining testimony from a minor by taping her in public. Prosecution also failed to show the arrest videotape of Cho which would have eliminated the need for her to take the witness stand. In 2011, the government paid 13 million won in compensation to Na-young for violations by the prosecution. After news of his sentencing was released, many petitions were left on the Blue House's website calling for a retrial.

== Aftermath ==
Na-young was left with permanent damage to her lower abdomen and was told she would be permanently disabled. She needed 8 months of treatment and had to take trips to Seoul every weekend. She was told she would need to use a colostomy bag for the rest of her life but underwent a successful surgery to implement an artificial anus. Na-young also suffered from depression after the attack. She was made to sit upright with her colostomy bag while giving her statement to prosecutors after the incident, which caused more psychological stress. Na-young's family received 13 million won in compensation because of violations against the interview policy for victims of sexual assault. A year after the assault, after receiving psychiatric treatment, she was said to have recovered 70 percent. She started attending school again and even attended a hagwon across the street from the place of incidence. According to her father from a report in 2020, she only watches cartoons and avoids news completely to avoid any possible chance of seeing something sexual assault-related.

== Reaction and influence ==
In 2011, R&B singer ALi released a song based on Na-young's story, titled "Nayoungee." The song attracted controversy after being widely criticized, and she chose to omit it from her upcoming album. She also subsequently issued an apology and then went on to say that the song was also about her own battle with being a rape victim.

In response to the case, a book and movie titled Hope was made in 2013. It won several awards and reignited attention about the case. The film also received a lot of criticism for making profit out of someone's tragedy and bringing attention to someone who wants to live a quiet life.

Democratic Party politician Kim Young-ho proposed legislation imposing harsher penalties for sex crimes against minors. He claimed, "The special bill on life imprisonment for criminals who recommit sexual crimes against minors, which I introduced, aims to isolate those who recommit the same crime after release permanently from society." In both 2014 and 2016, the Ministry of Justice introduced the Protective Supervision Act, a bill which would've confined the most extreme criminals to a remote facility following their release from prison; efforts to pass this into law received backlash for being a violation of human rights. Lawmaker Ko Young-in suggested a law restricting sex criminals from going farther than 200 meters from their home. Laws to keep sex criminals like Cho away from facilities with children and to keep him from being able to drink alcohol were also suggested. In response to Cho's impending release, 2 petitions for repealing the laws that weaken prison sentences for crimes committed while drunk and crimes committed by the mentally impaired have received 876,000 signatures. Both petitions were refused as they said they could not fill laws with passion.

== Release ==
Cho was released on December 12, 2020. He returned to Ansan to live with his wife less than 1 km away from the victim's house. Na-young's father has said that he would be willing to take out a loan to give money to Cho so Cho can leave Ansan. Cho said "I am sorry for my crimes, and if I am released, I will live quietly without causing controversy." He will have to wear an ankle monitor and will be under constant surveillance on probation for 7 years. His probation officer will also be able to make random visits to his home. Despite wearing an electronic ankle bracelet, there have been cases of criminals in Korea who were able to escape the country. 71 security cameras would be placed around Ansan for the safety of residents who fear Cho's release.

On May 20, 2021, South Korean Ministry of Justice and Ansan's government announced that the tracking and monitoring of Cho has cost over 200 million KRW during the first four months.

On March 20, 2024, Cho received a three-month prison sentence term for strolling outside past his 9 p.m. curfew for 40 minutes in December 2023.

== Cultural references ==
- Hope (2013 film)
- "Nayoungee" (Ali song)
- Taxi Driver (South Korean TV series)
- Vigilante (TV series)
- Voice (TV series)

== See also ==
- List of kidnappings
