= Lee Se-hee =

South Korean actress (born 1991)

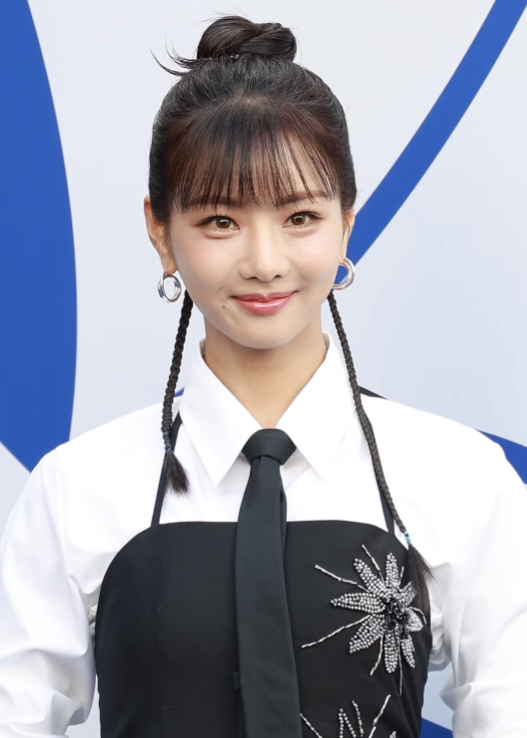
- Lee in February 2025
- Born: December 22, 1991 (age 34); Cheonan, South Korea
- Education: Hanyang Women's University
- Occupations: Actress; model
- Years active: 2015–present
- Agent: J-Wide Company

Korean name
- Hangul: 이세희
- RR: I Sehui
- MR: I Sehŭi

Lee Se-hee (Korean: 이세희; born December 22, 1991) is a South Korean actress. She made her acting debut in 2015 with a music video "364 Days of Dream", since then, she has appeared in number of films and television series. She got recognition for portraying role of Park Dan-dan in weekend TV series Young Lady and Gentleman (2021–2022) for which she won the best new actress award at 2021 KBS Drama Awards. She has acted in films as: Midnight Runners (2017) and Midnight (2021) among others. In 2020 she appeared in JTBC TV series Live On.

In 2022, she won the "Popularity Award (Actress)" at 2022 KBS Drama Awards for her performance in the series Bad Prosecutor.

== Career ==
Lee is affiliated to artist management company Family Entertainment. She was in dental hygiene when she changed her career to acting.

Lee debuted in Na Yoon-kwon's music video in 2015, and was cast in web series Sandwich Theory, Kiss Scene in Yeonnam-dong and Kiss Goblin in 2019. In 2020 she was in supporting cast of KakaoTV's Love Revolution, and appeared in MBC 'Cinematic Drama SF8 - White Crow.

In 2021, Lee appeared in season 2 of Hospital Playlist as Kang So-ye, first-year fellow in the Department of Emergency Medicine and she appeared as female lead in KBS's weekend family drama Young Lady and Gentleman. Her portrayal of Park Dan-dan, a resident tutor was appreciated. She got the role, breaking through the 500:1 competition and being termed as one of the 'discovery of the year'. The series currently ranks at the 3rd place among 'Top 50 series per nationwide viewers in Korea' and logged a national average viewership of 38.2% for its 48th episode. She also won the Best New Actress award and best couple award with Ji Hyun-woo at 2021 KBS Drama Awards for her role in the series.

In 2022, after success of her weekend drama, KBS cast her in their upcoming TV series Bad Prosecutor as Shin A-ra, a senior prosecutor at the Central District Prosecutors' Office. In November 2022, Lee signed an exclusive contract with J-Wide Company. In the same year, she won the Best Couple Award with Doh Kyung-soo and "Popularity Award (Actress)" at 2022 KBS Drama Awards for her performance in the series Bad Prosecutor.

== Other ventures ==
=== Endorsements ===
In September 2021, Lee was selected by Ed Hardy as a brand model with the launch of the golf wear line, and Liful Minimal Garments selected her as their brand muse. In October 2021, she was selected as model for global denim brand Siwy.

== Filmography ==
=== Films ===
Year	Title	Role	Notes	Ref.
2017	Midnight Runners	Club woman Se-hee		
2018	Fengshui	Gisaeng from Wolyounggak		
2020	Things Like Dogs	Mi-jeong		
2021	Midnight	Girlfriend	TVING Film	
2021	I Can Only See	Seo Yoo-ri		

=== Television series ===
Year	Title	Role	Notes	Ref.
2018	Let Me Introduce Her			
2019	Different Dreams			
2019	Everybody Says Kungddari	Young Jo Soon-ja		
2019	Catch the Ghost	Madonna		
2020	SF8	Jang Joon-oh	Episode 6, "White Crow"	
2020	Live On	Jung Hee-soo		
2021	My Roommate Is a Gumiho	Gisaeng	Cameo (Episode 1,10)	
2021	Hospital Playlist	Kang So-ye	Season 2	
2021–2022	Young Lady and Gentleman	Park Dan-dan		
2022	Bad Prosecutor	Shin A-ra		
2024	Beauty and Mr. Romantic	Se-ra	Cameo (Episode 17)	
2024	A Virtuous Business	Lee Joo-ri		
2025	The Dream Life of Mr. Kim	Park Ha-young		

=== Web series ===
Year	Title	Role	Ref.
2019	Sandwich Theory	Choi Sun Hee	
2019	Kiss Scene in Yeonnam-dong	Nam Jin-joo	
2020	Kiss Goblin	Yoon Seol-hee	
2020	Love Revolution	Jang Hae-ri	

=== Music video appearances ===
Year	Song title	Artist	Ref.
2015	"364 Days of Dream"	Na Yoon-kwon	
2016	"Just Come to Me"	Homme	
2017	"Sunny Tomorrow"	A Single Rider	

== Accolades ==
=== Awards and nominations ===
Name of the award ceremony, year presented, category, nominee of the award, and the result of the nomination
Award ceremony	Year	Category	Nominee / Work	Result	Ref.
KBS Drama Awards	2021	Best New Actress	Young Lady and Gentleman	Won	
KBS Drama Awards	2021	Best Couple Award	Lee Se-hee with Ji Hyun-woo; Young Lady and Gentleman	Won	
KBS Drama Awards	2022	Excellence Award, Actress in a Miniseries	Bad Prosecutor	Nominated	
KBS Drama Awards	2022	Popularity Award	Bad Prosecutor	Won	
KBS Drama Awards	2022	Best Couple Award	Lee Se-hee with Doh Kyung-soo; Bad Prosecutor	Won	

=== Listicles ===
Name of publisher, year listed, name of listicle, and placement
Publisher	Year	Listicle	Placement	Ref.
Forbes	2022	Korea Power Celebrity Rising Star	Placed	
