= Young Lady and Gentleman =

2021 South Korean television series

- Promotional poster
- Also known as: A Gentleman and a Young Lady
- Hangul: 신사와 아가씨
- Lit.: Gentleman and Lady
- RR: Sinsawa agassi
- MR: Sinsawa agassi
- Genre: Family drama; Romance; Comedy drama
- Created by: Kang Byung-taek; Moon Jun-ha; KBS Drama Division
- Written by: Kim Sa-kyung
- Directed by: Shin Chang-seok
- Starring: Ji Hyun-woo; Lee Se-hee; Cha Hwa-yeon
- Music by: Choi Cheol-ho
- Opening theme: "Love Always Runs"
- Country of origin: South Korea
- Original language: Korean
- No. of episodes: 52

Production
- Executive producer: Kim Sang-hwi (KBS)
- Producers: Lee Min-soo; Oh Sung-min; Kwak Hong-seok
- Camera setup: Single-camera
- Running time: 70-80 minutes
- Production company: GnG Production

Original release
- Network: KBS2
- Release: September 25, 2021 – March 27, 2022

Young Lady and Gentleman (Korean: 신사와 아가씨) is a South Korean television series starring Ji Hyun-woo, Lee Se-hee and Cha Hwa-yeon, and directed by Shin Chang-seok. The weekend drama revolves around Lee Yong-gook, a widower with three children and a live-in tutor for his kids, Park Dan-dan, to whom he becomes attracted. It premiered on KBS2 on September 25, 2021, and aired every Saturday and Sunday at 19:55 (KST) for 52 episodes till March 27, 2022.

The series won 7 awards at the 2021 KBS Drama Awards including Grand Prize (Daesang) by Ji Hyun-woo and the best couple award by him and Lee Se-hee. As per Nielsen Korea, the 48th episode aired on March 13, 2022, logged a national average viewership of 38.2% with 6.9 million viewers watching the episode. As of March 28, 2022, the series was in 3rd place among Top 50 series per nationwide viewers in Korea. Viewing the popularity of the series it was extended for 2 more episodes, making it 52 episodes in total.

== Synopsis ==
Dan-dan (Lee Se-hee) lives with her father, her stepmom and her stepbrother, Dae-beom, the ever-failing businessman, who has lost their home and all their money in a scam. Tired of putting up with them, she leaves home. Feeling down on her luck, she climbs up a mountain as a temporary relief from life's pressures. There, Dan-dan runs into and is startled by Young-guk (Ji Hyun-woo), who is hiking while dressed in a suit. Young-guk is the capable chairman of a corporation, as well as a widower with three kids. Dan-dan becomes their live-in tutor and, by chance, other members of her family also end up living at Young-guk's house. As she and Young Guk start to live together and look after Young-guk's kids, they find themselves in situations of conflict, both small and large. Despite their 14-year age difference, they start to grow fond of one another. With the help of Dan-dan, will Young-guk be able to overcome his grief and grow closer to his kids? The plot shares many significant story elements of The Sound of Music, Parasite, and The Nanny.

== Cast ==
=== Main ===
- Ji Hyun-woo as Lee Young-guk

41 years old, a widower, still grieving over the loss of his wife two years previously, with whom he had three children. He is the corporate chairman of FT Group (including Fantom) and is an attractive man in his early forties. In a twist of fate, Young-guk met Dan-dan when he was in military service.

- Lee Se-hee as Park Dan-dan
  - Kim Min-seo as young Park Dan-dan

27 years old, bright and bold personality, a live-in tutor of Lee Young-guk's children, a confident 'handmaiden' who seeks her own happiness. Dan-dan first met Young-guk when she was 12 years old.

- Kang Eun-tak as Cha Gun

The youngest son of Jin Dal-rae, maternal uncle of Dan-dan, Dae-beom and Mi-rim.

- Park Ha-na as Jo Sa-ra

36 years old, has managed Lee Young-guk's household for five years; she has a crush on him. She is the biological mother of Lee Se-jong.

=== Supporting ===
==== People around Lee Young-guk ====
- Cha Hwa-yeon as Wang Dae-ran

59 years old, Lee Se-ryun's biological mother. She is a former movie star and the stepmother of Lee Young-guk. She was Lee Ki-ja's middle-school classmate and later became the mistress to Young-guk's father at age 20.

- Yoon Jin-yi as Lee Se-ryun

36 years old, Lee Young-guk's younger half-sister, daughter of Wang Dae-ran. She falls in love with Park Dae-beom at first sight.

- Choi Myung-bin as Lee Jae-ni

14 years old, arrogant and rough eldest daughter of Lee Young-guk.

- Yoo Jun-seo as Lee Se-chan

10 years old, eldest son of Lee Young-guk, likes hip-hop and swag.

- Seo Woo-jin as Lee Se-jong

6 years old, a cute kindergartener and the (supposed) youngest son of Lee Young-guk.

- Lee Il-hwa as Anna Kim
  - Kang Se-jung as Kim Ji-young (who became Anna Kim after her accident) (cameo eps. 1 and 6)

Ex-wife of Park Soo-cheol and biological mother of Park Dan-dan. 10 years ago, she had a car accident and had dozens of major surgeries, she overcame all that and moved to the United States to succeed as a designer. Her mother had been Lee Young-guk's nanny many years ago.

==== People around Park Dan-dan ====
- Lee Jong-won as Park Soo-cheol

55 years old, husband of Cha Yeon-sil, the father of Park Dan-dan and stepfather of Park Dae-beom. He is a devoted father. Known as Kyung-Hoon as a child.

- Oh Hyun-kyung as Cha Yeon-sil

57 years old, daughter of Jin Dal-rae, wife of Park Soo-cheol, stepmother of Park Dan-dan and biological mother of Park Dae-beom. She likes drinking and dances and is full of aegyo.

- Ahn Woo-yeon as Park Dae-beom

29 years old, elder stepbrother of Park Dan-dan, cousin of Kang Mi-rim and Lee Se-ryun's love interest.

- Kim Young-ok as Jin Dal-rae

80 years old, mother of Cha Yeon-sil and Cha Gun, grandmother of Dae-beom, Dan-dan and Mi-rim.

- Kim Yi-kyung as Kang Mi-rim

25 years old, granddaughter of Jin Dal-rae, niece of Cha Yeon-sil and Cha Gun. Her mother is the deceased oldest daughter of Jin Dal-rae. Love interest of Bong Joon-oh.

=== Others ===
- Lee Hwi-hyang as Lee Ki-ja

59 years old widow, Jo Sa-ra's mother, Jang Mi-sook's high school classmate and Wang Dae-ran's middle-school classmate.

- Im Ye-jin as Jang Mi-sook

59 years old widow, Fantom clothing line store owner, Jang Gook-hee's adopted older sister and Bong Joon-oh's mother.

- Yang Byung-yeol as Bong Joon-oh

Jang Mi-sook's son, a kind and faithful medical student is good-looking and sweet.

- Wang Bit-na as Jang Gook-hee

40 years old, Lee Young-guk's college alumna and longtime friend, Jang Mi-sook's adopted younger sister. She emigrates to the USA.

- Eru as Ko Jung-woo

40 years old, Lee Young-guk's college alumnus, longtime friend and lawyer.

- Kim Young-joon as Oh Kyung-seok

Son of the director of Sa-Rang hospital. He wants to marry Lee Se-ryun for the sake of the hospital.

- Lee Tae-ri as Ma Hyun-bin

He is the senior of Park Dan-dan, who is friendly and kind. Young guk is jealous of him seeing his close relationship with Dan-dan.

- Han Jae-suk as Oh Seung-ho

A friend of Lee Se-ryun from studying abroad. but he used to like her.

- Kim Ga-yeon as Mrs. Kim, housekeeper and the home maid at the home of Lee Young-Guk.
- Yoon Ji-sook as Mrs. Yeoju, a housemaid, who secretly helps Park Dan Dan.
- Jeon Seung-bin as Jin Sang-goo

Lee Se-jong's biological father and Jo Sa-ra's old lover.

- Oh Seung-ah as Ahn Ji-min, who has liked Lee Young Guk for long enough to be able to send emails even while studying abroad.

=== Special appearance ===
- Lim Hye-young as Young-ae

Lee Young-guk's deceased wife (died at the age of 37), and mother of their 3 children. Jo Sa-ra's good friend.

- Hong Seok-cheon as Real Estate President
- Jo Eun-sook as Mi So-cheol's mistress
- Yang Chi-seung

He comes to see the house where Lee Ki-ja lives.

- Park Gwang-jae

He comes to see the house where Lee Ki-ja lives.

- Moon Hee-kyung as Seung-ho's mother Ep.36-42.

== Production ==
The writer of the series Kim Sa-Kyung returned to the KBS2 TV weekend drama after two and half years. Their last series was the 2019 weekend drama My Only One. Yoon Jin-yi, Im Ye-jin, Cha Hwa-yeon and Lee Hwi-hyang are working together after My Only One. In April 2021, Ji Hyun-woo's agency Ryan Heart and Park Hana's agency, FN Entertainment, and Cha Hwa-yeon confirmed that they were considering the offer of a role in the series. Kang Eun-tak, Park Ha-na, Ahn Woo-yeon and Yoon Jin-yi joined the cast in June 2021. On July 8, photos from the script reading site were released.

On November 16, 2021, it was reported that a confirmed case of COVID-19 caused the suspension of filming as per guidelines for the prevention of pandemic. Later, on November 17, 2021, it was reported that all the cast and crew had tested negative for COVID-19, resulting in filming and broadcasting as normal without interruption.

On December 10, 2021, it was reported that filming on December 9, 2021 had been cancelled due to COVID-19 being detected while filming, thus the filming was stopped. Later the same day, officials confirmed that the day before, "one officer tested positive for a routine corona 19 test," he said. We are running PCR tests if all results are negative, we will reschedule the filming.

On January 9, 2022, it was announced that the series will have 2 more episodes and air for 52 episodes instead of the previously announced 50 episodes.

On March 4, 2022, it was confirmed that actress Lee Se-hee tested positive for COVID-19 and thus quarantined for a week. She will not participate in the filming of the series during her quarantine period. Oh Hyun-kyung also tested positive from a self-diagnosis kit, her PCR test result is awaited.

On March 7, 2022, it was confirmed that actors Ahn Woo-yeon and Yang Byung-yeol had contracted COVID-19. Oh Hyun-kyung was also confirmed positive, resulting in a temporary suspension of filming. On March 11, filming was resumed after self quarantine period was over for infected actors.

On March 11, 2022, it was confirmed that actresses Lee Se-hee and Oh Hyun-kyung have recovered from COVID-19 and have resumed filming.

On March 17, 2022, it was reported that the script of the finale episode no. 52 has reached the cast, and filming will end on March 22, 2022.

== Release and reception ==
Young Lady and Gentleman began its first broadcast on KBS2 on September 25, 2021, and aired every Saturday and Sunday at 19:55 (KST).

On March 5, 2022 musical show Immortal Songs: Singing the Legend, held a special 546th episode for Young Lady and Gentleman cast, in which Im Ye-jin, Yoo Jun-seo, Moon Hee-kyung, Lee Chan-won, Yang Byung-yeol, Kim Yi-kyung and Park Ha-na gave performances.

Audience response

As per Nielsen Korea, the 48th episode aired on March 13, 2022, logged a national average viewership of 38.2% with 6.9 million viewers watching the episode, thereby breaking its own highest ratings. As of March 28, 2022, the series was in 3rd place among the 'Top 50 series per nationwide viewers in Korea'.

According to Gallup Korea in a March survey of Koreans' Favorite TV Programs, Young Lady and Gentleman took the top spot for 5 months with 8.7% preference.

OST response

"Love Always Runs", the main OST of the series arranged by composer Midnight, with lyrics by Kang Tae-gyu and sung by Lim Young-woong won the Asia Artist Awards and Seoul Music Awards for the Best OST. In addition, it ranked first in daily, weekly, and monthly charts, and in the ballad category. Moreover as of March 27, its music video, official audio video, lyrics video, and sound source video surpassed 47 million views cumulatively.

Twitter trend

The series took first place in Twitter real-time trend for the first quarter of 2022 as announced on April 14, by Twitter. 'Twitter real-time trend is the result of analyzing and counting the Twitter real-time trend, which became a measure of topicality when tweets related to works are concentrated in real time before, during and after airing, on Twitter, creating a buzz.'

Home media

The series was made available for streaming globally on Netflix on August 19, 2022.

== Original soundtrack ==
Young Lady and Gentleman

Soundtrack album by Various
- Released: 2021
- Genre: Soundtrack
- Languages: Korean; English
- Labels: Bugs; Most Contents

=== Part 1 ===
Released on October 3, 2021
No.	Title	Lyrics	Music	Artist	Length
1.	"It's Love" (사랑이야)	Ra.L	Park Jong-hyuk, Ra.L	Song Yu-jin	3:20
2.	"It's Love" (Inst.)		Park Jong-hyuk, Ra.L		3:20

=== Part 2 ===
Released on October 11, 2021
No.	Title	Lyrics	Music	Artist	Length
1.	"Love Always Runs Away" (사랑은 늘 도망가)	Kang Tae-gyu	Hong Jin-young	Lim Young-woong	4:03
2.	"Love Always Runs Away" (Inst.)		Hong Jin-young		4:03

=== Part 3 ===
Released on November 13, 2021
No.	Title	Lyrics	Music	Artist	Length
1.	"Dazzling Memories" (눈부신 기억)	Hana	Tom and Jerry	Hong Dae-kwang	4:19
2.	"Dazzling Memories Away" (Inst.)				4:19

=== Part 4 ===
Released on December 18, 2021
No.	Title	Lyrics	Music	Artist	Length
1.	"The Hidden Road" (가리워진 길)	Yoo Jae-ha	Yoo Jae-ha	Jeong Dong-won	3:28
2.	"The Hidden Road" (Inst.)		Yoo Jae-ha		3:28

=== Part 5 ===
Released on January 9, 2022
No.	Title	Music	Artist	Length
1.	"Invitation to Me" (나에게로의 초대)	Kim Young-Seong	long (or&)	4:10
2.	"Invitation to Me" (Inst.)			4:10

=== Part 6 ===
Released on February 20, 2022
No.	Title	Lyrics	Music	Artist	Length
1.	"Time Stopped at Parting" (이별에 멈춘 시간)	Kang Tae-gyu, Yoon Hee-seong	Shim Jae-woong	Yoon Yeo-gyu	4:17
2.	"Time Stopped at Parting" (Inst.)				4:17

== Viewership ==
Audience response

Young Lady and Gentleman : South Korea viewers per episode (millions)

Episodes	Episode number									
Episodes	1	2	3	4	5	6	7	8	9	10
Ep. 1–10	3.855	4.429	4.026	4.314	4.063	4.772	4.447	5.306	4.555	5.324
Ep. 11–20	4.552	5.218	4.646	5.188	4.886	5.722	4.759	5.338	5.026	5.480
Ep. 21–30	5.107	5.662	5.041	5.810	5.490	6.187	5.991	6.469	5.776	6.319
Ep. 31–40	5.798	6.725	5.854	6.210	5.780	6.428	5.659	6.091	5.453	5.411
Ep. 41–50	4.987	6.797	5.773	5.957	6.247	6.956	6.469	6.936	6.064	6.691
Ep. 51–52	6.191	6.783	–							

Source: Audience measurement performed nationwide by Nielsen Korea.

Ep.	Broadcast date	Average audience share		
Ep.	Broadcast date	Nielsen Korea		TNmS
Ep.	Broadcast date	Nationwide	Seoul	Nationwide
1	September 25, 2021	22.7% (1st)	20.7% (1st)	19.4% (1st)
2	September 26, 2021	26.5% (1st)	24.9% (1st)	21.9% (1st)
3	October 2, 2021	24.3% (1st)	23.1% (1st)	18.7% (1st)
4	October 3, 2021	25.3% (1st)	24.3% (1st)	21.0% (1st)
5	October 9, 2021	24.4% (1st)	23.3% (1st)	19.6% (1st)
6	October 10, 2021	27.8% (1st)	26.3% (1st)	22.6% (1st)
7	October 16, 2021	24.8% (1st)	26.3% (1st)	20.2% (1st)
8	October 17, 2021	29.7% (1st)	27.7% (1st)	23.8% (1st)
9	October 23, 2021	26.8% (1st)	25.3% (1st)	21.6% (1st)
10	October 24, 2021	30.4% (1st)	28.6% (1st)	26.5% (1st)
11	October 30, 2021	26.9% (1st)	25.4% (1st)	22.8% (1st)
12	October 31, 2021	30.0% (1st)	28.7% (1st)	24.9% (1st)
13	November 6, 2021	27.8% (1st)	26.5% (1st)	22.6% (1st)
14	November 7, 2021	30.5% (1st)	28.4% (1st)	26.9% (1st)
15	November 13, 2021	28.2% (1st)	26.4% (1st)	24.1% (1st)
16	November 14, 2021	32.4% (1st)	31.1% (1st)	27.2% (1st)
17	November 20, 2021	28.0% (1st)	26.8% (1st)	25.3% (1st)
18	November 21, 2021	30.3% (1st)	29.7% (1st)	26.8% (1st)
19	November 27, 2021	28.5% (1st)	26.6% (1st)	—N/a
20	November 28, 2021	31.3% (1st)	29.6% (1st)	23.9% (1st)
21	December 4, 2021	29.8% (1st)	28.2% (1st)	22.5% (1st)
22	December 5, 2021	32.6%(1st)	30.6% (1st)	26.7% (1st)
23	December 11, 2021	29.5% (1st)	28.8% (1st)	24.9% (1st)
24	December 12, 2021	33.6% (1st)	32.2% (1st)	26.1% (1st)
25	December 18, 2021	31.6% (1st)	30.5% (1st)	26.8% (1st)
26	December 19, 2021	34.5% (1st)	33.2% (1st)	28.1% (1st)
27	December 25, 2021	32.9% (1st)	31.5% (1st)	—N/a
28	December 26, 2021	35.7%(1st)	34.7% (1st)	29.0% (1st)
29	January 1, 2022	31.4% (1st)	30.0% (1st)	23.6% (1st)
30	January 2, 2022	34.4% (1st)	33.2% (1st)	24.0% (1st)
31	January 8, 2022	32.3% (1st)	31.0% (1st)	23.3% (1st)
32	January 9, 2022	36.0% (1st)	35.2% (1st)	25.7% (1st)
33	January 15, 2022	32.5% (1st)	31.8% (1st)	22.5% (1st)
34	January 16, 2022	33.5% (1st)	32.3% (1st)	25.3% (1st)
35	January 22, 2022	31.8% (1st)	30.7% (1st)	23.1% (1st)
36	January 23, 2022	34.7% (1st)	32.9% (1st)	25.5% (1st)
37	January 29, 2022	32.0% (1st)	30.5% (1st)	—N/a
38	January 30, 2022	32.6% (1st)	31.8% (1st)	23.4% (1st)
39	February 6, 2022 (Note: The 39th episode was cancelled for February 5, due to telecast of 2022 Winter Olympics.)	29.6% (1st)	28.7% (1st)	21.5% (1st)
40	February 12, 2022	30.1% (1st)	28.8% (1st)	23.8% (1st)
41	February 19, 2022 (Note: The 41st episode was cancelled for February 13, due to telecast of 2022 Winter Olympics.)	27.9% (1st)	27.3% (1st)	23.0% (1st)
42	February 20, 2022	36.8% (1st)	35.2% (1st)	30.0% (1st)
43	February 26, 2022	32.2% (1st)	31.0% (1st)	26.3% (1st)
44	February 27, 2022	32.9% (1st)	32.2% (1st)	27.0% (1st)
45	March 5, 2022	34.0% (1st)	32.3% (1st)	27.2% (1st)
46	March 6, 2022	37.2% (1st)	36.1% (1st)	30.9% (1st)
47	March 12, 2022	35.7% (1st)	34.4% (1st)	29.8% (1st)
48	March 13, 2022	38.2% (1st)	36.6% (1st)	30.8% (1st)
49	March 19, 2022	34.5% (1st)	32.9% (1st)	29.1% (1st)
50	March 20, 2022	36.5% (1st)	35.5% (1st)	30.0% (1st)
51	March 26, 2022	34.6% (1st)	32.9% (1st)	30.2% (1st)
52	March 27, 2022	36.8% (1st)	35.3% (1st)	32.6% (1st)
Average		31.25%	29.96%	N/A
In the table above, the blue numbers represent the lowest ratings and the red numbers represent the highest ratings.; N/A denotes that the rating is not known.

== Awards and nominations ==
Name of the award ceremony, year presented, category, nominee of the award, and the result of the nomination
Award ceremony	Year	Category	Nominee	Result	Ref.
APAN Star Awards	2022	Top Excellence Award, Actor in a Serial Drama	Ji Hyun-woo	Nominated	
APAN Star Awards	2022	Excellence Award, Actor in a Serial Drama	Kang Eun-tak	Nominated	
APAN Star Awards	2022	Excellence Award, Actress in a Serial Drama	Park Ha-na	Nominated	
APAN Star Awards	2022	Best OST Award	Lim Young-woong	Won	
Asia Artist Awards	2021	Best OST Award	Lim Young-woong	Won	
KBS Drama Awards	2021	Grand Prize (Daesang)	Ji Hyun-woo	Won	
KBS Drama Awards	2021	Excellence Award, Actress in a Serial Drama	Park Ha-na	Won	
KBS Drama Awards	2021	Best New Actress	Lee Se-hee	Won	
KBS Drama Awards	2021	Best Young Actress	Choi Myung-bin	Won	
KBS Drama Awards	2021	Best Young Actor	Seo Woo-jin	Won	
KBS Drama Awards	2021	Best Young Actor	Yoo Joon-seo	Nominated	
KBS Drama Awards	2021	Best Writer	Kim Sa-kyung	Won	
KBS Drama Awards	2021	Best Couple Award	Ji Hyun-woo and Lee Se-hee	Won	
KBS Drama Awards	2021	Best Supporting Actress	Lee Il-hwa	Nominated	
KBS Drama Awards	2021	Excellence Award, Actor in a Serial Drama	Kang Eun-tak	Nominated	
Korea Advertisers Contest	2022	Advertiser's Choice Program Award	Young Lady and Gentleman	Won	
Seoul International Drama Awards	2022	Best Original Soundtrack	Lim Young-woong	Won	
Seoul Music Awards	2022	Original Soundtrack Award	Lim Young-woong	Won	
