= Max Frisch bibliography =

This is a bibliography of works by Max Frisch.

Note: Titles appearing in brackets have not been translated into English so their names are literal translations of the original German titles.

== Novels and Novellas ==
English title	Original German title	Translations	Notes
[Jürg Reinhart]	Jürg Reinhart; Eine sommerliche Schicksalsfahrt (1934)	-	
An Answer from the Silence: A Story from the Mountains	Antwort aus der Stille (1937)	by Mike Mitchell (2011)	
[I Adore What Burns Me, or Difficult Persons]	J'adore ce qui me brûle, oder Die Schwierigen (1944)	-	
I'm Not Stiller	Stiller (1954)	By Michael Bullock (1958)	
Homo Faber	Homo Faber (1957)	By Michael Bullock (1959)	
Gantenbein	Mein Name sei Gantenbein (1964)	By Michael Bullock (1965)	Also published as A Wilderness of Mirrors
Wilhelm Tell: a School Text	Wilhelm Tell für die Schule (1971)	By Lore Segal and Paul Stern (1989)	Published in Max Frisch: Novels Plays Essays and in a 1978 issue of Fiction Magazine
Montauk	Montauk (1975)	By Geoffrey Skelton (1978)	
Man in the Holocene	Der Mensch erscheint im Holozän (1979)	By Geoffrey Skelton (1980)	
Bluebeard	Blaubart (1982)	By Geoffrey Skelton (1983)	

== Dramatic works ==
English title	Original German title	Translations / Publications
Now They Are Singing Again	Nun singen sie wieder (1945)	By Alice Carey in Max Frisch: Novels Plays Essays (1989); By Michael Bullock in Three Plays (2002)
Santa Cruz	Santa Cruz (1947)	By Michael Bullock in Three Plays (2002)
The Great Wall of China	Die Chinesische Mauer (1947)	By James L. Rosenberg (1961); By Michael Bullock in Four Plays (1969)
When the War Was Over	Als der Krieg zu Ende war (1949)	By James L. Rosenberg in Three Plays (1967)
Count Oederland	Graf Öderland (1951)	By Michael Bullock in Three Plays (1962)
The Fire Raisers	Biedermann und die Brandstifter (1953)	As The Fire Raisers by Michael Bullock (1962); As The Firebugs by Peter Faecke (1966); As The Arsonists by Alistair Beaton (2007)
Don Juan, or the Love of Geometry	Don Juan oder Die Liebe zur Geometrie (1953)	By James L. Rosenberg in Three Plays (1967); By Michael Bullock in Four Plays (1969)
Rip Van Winkle	Rip Van Winkle, 1953	By Michael Bullock in Three Plays (2002)
The Great Rage of Philip Hotz	Die Grosse Wut des Philipp Hotz (1956)	By James L. Rosenberg in Three Plays (1967); As Philip Hotz's Fury by Michael Bullock in Four Plays (1969)
Andorra	Andorra (1961)	By Michael Bullock (1962)
Zurich Transit: Sketch of a Film	Zürich – Transit. Skizze eines Films (1966)	By Birgit Schreyer Duarte (2010)
Biography: A Game	Biografie (1967)	By Michael Bullock in Four Plays (1969); By Birgit Schreyer Duarte (2010)
Triptych: Three Scenic Panels	Tryptichon. Drei szenische Bilder (1978)	By Geoffrey Skelton (1981)
[Jonas and his Veteran]	Jonas und sein Veteran (1989)	-

== Non fiction ==
English title	Original German title	Translator
[Leaves from the Bread Bag]	Blätter aus dem Brotsack (1940)	-
Sketchbook 1946-1949	Tagebuch 1946–1949 (1950)	Geoffrey Skelton (1977)
Sketchbook 1966-1971	Tagebuch 1966–1971 (1972)	Geoffrey Skelton (1983)
Military Service Record	Dienstbüchlein (1974)	Alice Carey in Max Frisch: Novels Plays Essays (1989)
Drafts for a Third Sketchbook	Entwürfe zu einem dritten Tagebuch (posthumously in 2010)	Mike Mitchell (2013)
From the Berlin Journal	Aus dem Berliner Journal (posthumously in 2014)	Wieland Hoban (2017)

== Collections in English ==
Title	Contents	Translators
Max Frisch: Novels Plays Essays (1989)	Excerpts from novels, plays, essays and speeches	Michael Bullock, Geoffrey Skelton, Alice Carey, Rolf Kieser, Lore Segal and Paul Stern
