= Han (Korean surname) =

Korean surname

- Hangul: 한
- Hanja: 韓
- RR: Han
- MR: Han

Han (Korean: 한; Hanja: 韓) is the typical romanized spelling of the Korean family name 한. Other alternate spellings for 한 include Hahn and Haan. In hanja, it translates to "king", "kingdom", "country" or "Korean people". Han is the oldest name in Korea.

== Clans ==
As with all the Korean family names, the holders of the Han surname are divided into different patrilineal clans, or lineages, known in Korean as bon-gwan, based on their ancestral seat. Most such clans trace their lineage back to a specific founder. This system was at its height under the Joseon dynasty, but it remains in use today. There are approximately 241 such clans claimed by South Koreans.

=== Cheongju clan ===
The Cheongju Han clan is considered one of the noble clans of Korea along with the Gyeongju Kim, Gimhae Kim, Miryang Park, Gyeongju Seok, Pyongyang Ko, and Jeonju Yi clans. The founder of the Cheongju Han clan was Han Ran, who lived during the era of Wang Kŏn.

During the Joseon dynasty, the Cheongju Han clan produced 16 queens and were considered the highest of the yangban class, next to the Jeonju Yi clan. The clan provided the Joseon dynasty with the biggest number of generals, including Han Myŏnghoe, who was one Joseon's greatest generals and the father of Queen Jangsun (first wife of Yejong) and Queen Gonghye (first wife of Seongjong).

=== Danju clan ===
The Danju Han clan was founded by Han Chong-rye, in the 10th century AD.

=== Samhwa clan ===
Its representative person is the calligrapher Han Ho.

=== Goksan clan ===
Han Ye, the founder of the Goksan Han clan, came to Goryeo from the Song dynasty, in 1206. His descendants include Han Yi-won (韓以原), who lived during the reign of Sukjong of Joseon, and excelled in poetry and epidemiology and Han Yeo-yu (韓汝愈), Han Si-yu (韓是愈), and Han Mun-gun (韓文健), who gained fame as scholars.

In 2015, there were 6,266 members of Goksan Han clan in South Korea.

== Notable people with the surname ==
=== Singers ===
- Hash Swan (born Han Deok-kwang, 1995), South Korean rapper
- Han Dong-geun (born 1993), South Korean singer
- Han Hee-jun (born 1989), South Korean singer
- Han Hye-ri (born 1997), South Korean singer and actress
- Han Ji-hoon (born 2006), South Korean singer, member of boy band TWS
- Han Ji-sung (born 2000), South Korean rapper and songwriter, member of boy band Stray Kids
- Hyuk (singer) (born Han Sang-hyuk, 1995), South Korean singer, member of boy band VIXX
- Han Seung-woo (born 1994), South Korean singer and actor, member of boy band Victon
- Han Seo-hee (born 1982), North Korean defector and singer
- Han Seung-yeon (born 1988), South Korean singer and actress
- Han Sun-hwa (born 1990), South Korean singer and actress
- Han Yo-han (born 1991), South Korean rapper
- Han Yu-jin (born 2007), South Korean singer, member of boy band And2ble
- Yuny Han (born 1983), South Korean actress and former member of Japanese bands Brandnew Biscuits and Memory Cats

=== Actors and actresses ===
- Han Bo-bae
- Han Bo-reum
- Han Chae-ah
- Han Chae-young
- Han Da-min
- Han Do-woo
- Han Eun-jung
- Han Ga-in
- Han Go-eun
- Han Hye-jin (actress)
- Han Hye-rin
- Han Hye-sook
- Han Hyo-joo
- Han Jae-suk
- Han Ji-an
- Han Ji-eun
- Han Ji-hye
- Han Ji-hyun
- Han Ji-min
- Han Ji-sang
- Han Ji-wan
- Han Jin-hee
- Han Joo-wan
- Han Joon-woo
- Han Jung-soo
- Han Ki-woong
- Han Na-na
- Han Sang-jin
- Han So-hee
- Han Soo-yeon
- Han Suk-kyu
- Han Sung-yun
- Han Ye-ri
- Han Ye-seul
- Han Yeo-reum

=== Sports ===
- Han Ho-gang (born 1993), Japanese Korean footballer
- Han Kyu-chul (born 1981), South Korean swimmer
- Han Min-su (born 1970), South Korean ice sledge hockey player
- Han Seung-woo (sport shooter) (born 1983), South Korean shooter
- Han Kwang-song (born 1998), North Korean football player
- James Hahn (golfer) (born 1981), Korean American golfer
- Han "Peanut" Wang-ho (born 1998), South Korean E-sports player

=== Others ===
- Han Terra (born 1982), South Korean polymath
- Byung-Chul Han (born 1959), South Korean-born German philosopher
- Han Chang-seob (born 1967), South Korean public official
- Han Hye-jin (model) (born 1983), South Korean model
- Han Sŏkpong (1543–1605), Joseon calligrapher
- Han Tong-il (1941–2024), South Korean pianist
- Han Yong-un (1879–1944), Korean Buddhist reformer and poet

== Related surnames with Cheongju Han ==
There are two Korean surnames which are believed to be related and share common ancestry and origin with the Cheongju Han. The Taewon Seonwoo and the Hangju Gi clans are believed to have originated from the same root as the Cheongju Han clan.

According to genealogical records, Gijun, the last King of Gojoseon, is believed to have had three sons, U-Pyeong (우평), U-Seong (우성) and U-Ryang (우량). During Korea's Three Kingdoms period, U-Pyeong is said to have settled in Goguryeo, and his descendants later established the Taewon Seonwoo clan, U-Seong is said to have settled in Baekje, and his descendants later established the Hangju Gi clan and finally, U-Ryang is said to have settled in Silla and his descendants later established the Cheongju Han clan, with its bon-gwan in Cheongju.

== Gojoseon ==
Many Korean historians believe that Gijun of Gojoseon was actually "Hanjun" (한준) and had the surname Han (韓), not Gi and that all of the kings of Gojoseon were of the surname Han (韓).

There is a controversy over Gija's origin. It is believed that he came from the Chinese Shang dynasty and was a paternal uncle (or brother) of the last Shang ruler, King Zhou, however Gija likely came from the Eastern Yi. Gija and his descendants were also believed to have the surname Han (韓), as Jun, the last King of Gojoseon and a descendant of Gija, who, after fleeing from Wiman, claimed himself as the King of Han (한왕; 韓王), when he founded Mahan (part of the Samhan). With this it shows that the surname Han may have existed since the time of Gojoseon and establishes the Han clan (韓) as the oldest surname in Korea (dating back to around 5000 years ago) and as the rulers Gojoseon and Mahan.

However, many Korean historians deny any existence of Gija and Gija Joseon, accepting it as a legend.

== See also ==
- Han
- Cheongju Han clan
