= Blow Breeze =

2016 South Korean TV drama

- Also known as: Blow It, Mi-poong; Blown with the Beautiful Wind (Note: Official title used by LOEN Entertainment, the publisher of the drama's original soundtrack); Windy Mi-poong; Breeze of Love; Breezy Love
- Hangul: 불어라 미풍아
- RR: Bureora Mipunga
- MR: Purŏra Mip'unga
- Genre: Romance; Comedy; Melodrama
- Written by: Kim Sa-kyung
- Directed by: Yoon Jae-moon
- Starring: Son Ho-jun; Lim Ji-yeon; Han Joo-wan; Oh Ji-eun (Note: On September 26, 2016, Oh Ji-eun injured her ankle while filming Blow Breeze. It was already prescribed that she should rest her ankle for eight weeks, however, she went back to work, therefore aggravating the injury that a surgery was later required. After negotiations between MBC, DK E&M and her agency Family Actors Entertainment, Oh decided to leave. She was replaced by Im Soo-hyang.); Im Soo-hyang; Hwang Bo-ra; Jang Se-hyun
- Country of origin: South Korea
- Original language: Korean
- No. of episodes: 53 (50 (original) + 3 (extension))

Production
- Executive producer: Shin Hyun-chang
- Producers: Kim Dong-goo; Yoon Yong; Cho Ho-gyul
- Running time: Saturdays and Sundays at 20:40 (KST)
- Production companies: DK E&M; ONDA Entertainment

Original release
- Network: MBC TV
- Release: August 27, 2016 – February 26, 2017

Blow Breeze (Korean: 불어라 미풍아) is a 2016 South Korean weekend drama.

It stars Son Ho-jun, Lim Ji-yeon, Han Joo-wan, Oh Ji-eun, Hwang Bo-ra, and Jang Se-hyun, and was aired on MBC TV on Saturdays and Sundays at 20:40 for 50 episodes from August 27, 2016.

== Plot ==
Mi-poong is a North Korean girl who studies dancing. She is bright and easygoing despite the situation in her country. One day, she defects to Seoul, South Korea. She then meets Jang-go, an honest South Korean lawyer. Both of them get entangled in a family inheritance problem.

== Cast ==
=== Main characters ===
- Lim Ji-yeon as Kim Mi-poong / Kim Seung-hee
- Son Ho-jun as Lee Jang-go
  - Yoon Chan-young as young Jang-go.
- Han Joo-wan as Jo Hee-dong
- Oh Ji-eun as Park Shin Ae (Episode 1 to 12)
- Im Soo-hyang as Park Shin Ae (Episode 13 to 53 )
- Hwang Bo-ra as Jo Hee-ra

=== People around Jang-go ===
- Kim Young-ok as Dal-rae
- Geum Bo-ra as Hwang Geum-sil
- Kim Hee-jung as Lee Nam-yi
- Lee Dae-yeon as Lee Kyung-shik
- Han Hye-rin as Jang Ha-yeon
- Kim Hyun as Soon-boon

=== People around Mi-poong ===
- Lee Il-hwa as Joo Young-ae
- Shin Cheol-jin as Mr.Yoo
- Hong Dong-young as Kim Yoo-sung

=== Others ===
- Ham Sung-min as Kim Deok-cheon
- Son Woo-hyeon

=== Guests ===
- Joo Suk-tae as Private investigator
- Kim Byeong-ok as Plastic surgeon (cameo)

== Ratings ==
In the table below, the blue numbers represent the lowest ratings and the red numbers represent the highest ratings.

Episode #	Original broadcast date	Average audience share			
Episode #	Original broadcast date	TNmS Ratings		AGB Nielsen Ratings	
Episode #	Original broadcast date	Nationwide	Seoul National Capital Area	Nationwide	Seoul National Capital Area
1	August 27, 2016	10.3%	10.1%	10.4%	11.3%
2	August 28, 2016	12.4%	11.5%	11.6%	12.7%
3	September 3, 2016	12.0%		11.4%	12.5%
4	September 4, 2016	14.0%	14.1%	13.3%	14.4%
5	September 10, 2016	12.9%	12.3%	12.1%	12.5%
6	September 11, 2016	13.3%	13.2%	13.6%	15.1%
7	September 17, 2016	13.6%	12.6%	13.1%	13.3%
8	September 18, 2016	12.8%	11.1%	13.1%	13.9%
9	September 24, 2016	11.8%	10.8%	12.0%	12.7%
10	September 25, 2016	12.7%	12.0%	13.2%	14.0%
11	October 1, 2016	13.1%	13.3%	11.1%	11.4%
12	October 2, 2016	12.3%	11.6%	11.2%	11.7%
13	October 8, 2016	12.8%	12.5%	11.6%	12.0%
14	October 9, 2016	12.9%	11.9%	12.8%	13.3%
15	October 15, 2016	11.7%	11.2%	11.9%	12.2%
16	October 16, 2016	12.5%		12.3%	13.1%
17	October 22, 2016	10.4%	10.1%	10.0%	10.6%
18	October 23, 2016	12.6%	12.7%	12.3%	13.4%
19	October 29, 2016	11.8%	12.0%	11.2%	11.2%
20	October 30, 2016	11.9%	11.6%	11.2%	12.0%
21	November 5, 2016	11.0%	10.9%	11.3%	12.0%
22	November 6, 2016	12.4%	12.7%	13.0%	13.7%
23	November 12, 2016	10.6%	10.5%	10.3%	10.8%
24	November 13, 2016	12.1%	11.7%	12.1%	13.0%
25	November 19, 2016	10.6%	9.7%	9.3%	9.7%
26	November 20, 2016	14.8%	13.8%	14.7%	15.2%
27	November 26, 2016	11.6%	11.2%	10.9%	
28	November 27, 2016	15.1%	15.0%	12.8%	12.9%
29	December 3, 2016	11.4%	11.5%	10.6%	11.0%
30	December 4, 2016	15.2%	14.7%	14.0%	14.8%
31	December 10, 2016	12.8%	13.2%	12.5%	13.1%
32	December 11, 2016	13.8%	13.7%	14.2%	14.8%
33	December 17, 2016	12.4%	12.1%	11.3%	11.7%
34	December 18, 2016	16.1%	16.5%	15.1%	14.9%
35	December 24, 2016	12.4%	12.5%	11.6%	12.1%
36	December 25, 2016	16.3%	15.3%	15.1%	15.5%
37	January 1, 2017	18.7%	19.0%	18.9%	19.4%
38	January 7, 2017	15.4%	15.1%	13.8%	
39	January 8, 2017	18.6%	19.7%	18.1%	18.6%
40	January 14, 2017	16.6%	16.3%	15.7%	16.0%
41	January 15, 2017	20.5%	19.8%	19.5%	20.7%
42	January 21, 2017	15.3%	15.9%	14.0%	13.9%
43	January 22, 2017	19.8%	20.4%	19.3%	19.7%
44	January 28, 2017	16.4%	15.8%	14.9%	15.0%
45	January 29, 2017	18.8%	19.9%	18.3%	18.4%
46	February 4, 2017	18.1%	18.9%	19.0%	19.2%
47	February 5, 2017	21.6%	21.5%	21.6%	22.4%
48	February 11, 2017	18.5%	18.3%	18.4%	18.9%
49	February 12, 2017	22.1%		22.2%	22.9%
50	February 18, 2017	22.4%	24.0%	22.7%	23.7%
51	February 19, 2017	25.2%	26.2%	26.6%	27.8%
52	February 25, 2017	21.5%	22.3%	22.7%	24.3%
53	February 26, 2017	23.9%	24.4%	26.3%	28.3%
Average		14.9%	14.8%	14.5%	15.1%

Note:
- Blow Breeze was originally a 50-episode series, but it was given a three-episode extension on January 9, 2017.
- Episode 37 was delayed a day due to the special New Year broadcast of MBC Gayo Daejejeon on December 31, 2016.

== Original soundtrack ==
Blown with the Beautiful Wind Original Soundtrack

Soundtrack album by Various Artists
- Released: February 28, 2017
- Genre: Soundtrack
- Labels: Plus Media; LOEN
- Producer: Lee Sung-kwon

=== Part 1 ===
No.	Title	Lyrics	Music	Artist	Length
1.	"You are Love" (그대 사랑)	Jeon Chan-yeop; Jeon Jun-kyu	Jeon Chan-yeop; Jeon Jun-kyu	Lee Hyun	3:37
2.	"You are Love" (Inst.)		Jeon Chan-yeop; Jeon Jun-kyu		3:37
Total length:					7:14

=== Part 2 ===
No.	Title	Lyrics	Music	Artist	Length
1.	"Loved and Wanted" (사랑하고 원했죠)	Jin Myung-yong	Jin Myung-yong	Gavy NJ	4:23
2.	"Loved and Wanted" (Inst.)		Jin Myung-yong		4:23
Total length:					8:46

=== Part 3 ===
No.	Title	Lyrics	Music	Artist	Length
1.	"Those Words (I Will Love)" (그 말)	Jeon Chan-yeop; Jeon Jun-kyu	Jeon Chan-yeop; Jeon Jun-kyu	Jang Han-byul	3:49
2.	"Those Words (I Will Love)" (Inst.)		Jeon Chan-yeop; Jeon Jun-kyu		3:49
Total length:					7:38

=== Part 4 ===
No.	Title	Lyrics	Music	Artist	Length
1.	"Oh Happy" (살만합니다)	Samachun	Kiho; Kim Kyeong-beom a/k/a As You Know (알고보니 혼수상태)	Jang Yun-jeong	3:21
2.	"Oh Happy" (Inst.)		Kiho; Kim Kyeong-beom a/k/a As You Know (알고보니 혼수상태)		3:21
Total length:					6:42

=== Part 5 ===
No.	Title	Lyrics	Music	Artist	Length
1.	"Thank You" (늘 고마운 사람)	Lee Do-hoon; Kim Kyeong-beom a/k/a As You Know (알고보니 혼수상태)	Lee Do-hoon; Kim Kyeong-beom a/k/a As You Know (알고보니 혼수상태)	Park Seung-hwa (Yurisangja)	4:20
2.	"Thank You" (Inst.)		Lee Do-hoon; Kim Kyeong-beom a/k/a As You Know (알고보니 혼수상태)		4:20
Total length:					8:40

=== Part 6 ===
No.	Title	Lyrics	Music	Artist	Length
1.	"Bravo" (브라보)	Samachun; Kim Kyeong-beom a/k/a As You Know (알고보니 혼수상태)	Kiho; Kim Kyeong-beom a/k/a As You Know (알고보니 혼수상태)	Jo Hang-jo	4:20
2.	"Bravo" (Inst.)		Kiho; Kim Kyeong-beom a/k/a As You Know (알고보니 혼수상태)		4:20
Total length:					8:40

=== Part 7 ===
No.	Title	Lyrics	Music	Artist	Length
1.	"Wind, Sunshine, Memories" (바람, 햇살, 기억)	2LSON; Mokulsha	2LSON; Mokulsha	2LSON feat. WiNee	4:36
2.	"Wind, Sunshine, Memories" (Inst.)		2LSON; Mokulsha		4:36
Total length:					9:06

=== Part 8 ===
No.	Title	Lyrics	Music	Artist	Length
1.	"My Life" (세월아)	Samachun	Kim Kyeong-beom a/k/a As You Know (알고보니 혼수상태)	Keum Jan-di	4:04
2.	"My Life" (Inst.)		Kim Kyeong-beom a/k/a As You Know (알고보니 혼수상태)		4:04
Total length:					8:08

=== Part 9 ===
No.	Title	Lyrics	Music	Artist	Length
1.	"As One Wishes..." (원하는대로)	Jeon Chan-yeop; Jeon Jun-kyu	Jeon Chan-yeop; Jeon Jun-kyu	Postmen	3:56
2.	"As One Wishes..." (Inst.)		Jeon Chan-yeop; Jeon Jun-kyu		3:56
Total length:					7:52

=== Part 10 ===
No.	Title	Lyrics	Music	Artist	Length
1.	"Thought of You" (그리움만 쌓이네)	Yeojin	Yeojin; Kim Eui-yong; Keyman; Bae Sae-rom	Huh Gong	4:17
2.	"Thought of You" (Inst.)		Yeojin; Kim Eui-yong; Keyman; Bae Sae-rom		4:17
Total length:					8:34

=== Part 11 ===
No.	Title	Lyrics	Music	Artist	Length
1.	"My Pain" (못)	Park Sae-yoon a/k/a Kaiser Project; Kim Kyeong-beom a/k/a As You Know (알고보니 혼수상태)	Park Sae-yoon a/k/a Kaiser Project; Kim Kyeong-beom a/k/a As You Know (알고보니 혼수상태)	Eru	4:20
2.	"My Pain" (Inst.)		Park Sae-yoon a/k/a Kaiser Project; Kim Kyeong-beom a/k/a As You Know (알고보니 혼수상태)		4:20
Total length:					8:40

=== Part 12 ===
No.	Title	Lyrics	Music	Artist	Length
1.	"Because of You" (이별같은 사랑)	Lee Sang-eon; Kim Kyeong-beom a/k/a As You Know (알고보니 혼수상태)	Kim Kyeong-beom a/k/a As You Know (알고보니 혼수상태)	Eun Ga-eun	3:57
2.	"Because of You" (Inst.)		Kim Kyeong-beom a/k/a As You Know (알고보니 혼수상태)		3:57
Total length:					7:54

=== Part 13 ===
No.	Title	Lyrics	Music	Artist	Length
1.	"I Can Not Forget" (잊을 수 없다)	Jo Jae-yoon a/k/a BadBosS; Kim Kyeong-beom a/k/a As You Know (알고보니 혼수상태)	Jo Jae-yoon a/k/a BadBosS; Kim Kyeong-beom a/k/a As You Know (알고보니 혼수상태)	Heo Young-saeng (Double S 301)	4:00
2.	"I Can Not Forget" (Inst.)		Jo Jae-yoon a/k/a BadBosS; Kim Kyeong-beom a/k/a As You Know (알고보니 혼수상태)		4:00
Total length:					8:00

=== Part 14 ===
No.	Title	Lyrics	Music	Artist	Length
1.	"Listen" (들려)	Kwak Tae-hoon; Kim Kyeong-beom a/k/a As You Know (알고보니 혼수상태)	Kwak Tae-hoon; Kim Kyeong-beom a/k/a As You Know (알고보니 혼수상태)	Ulala Session	4:06
2.	"Listen" (Inst.)		Kwak Tae-hoon; Kim Kyeong-beom a/k/a As You Know (알고보니 혼수상태)		4:06
Total length:					8:12

=== Part 15 ===
No.	Title	Lyrics	Music	Artist	Length
1.	"You are Love (Female Version)" (그대 사랑)	Jeon Chan-yeop; Jeon Jun-kyu	Jeon Chan-yeop; Jeon Jun-kyu	Song Ha-ye	4:08
2.	"You are Love" (Inst.)		Jeon Chan-yeop; Jeon Jun-kyu		4:08
Total length:					8:16

=== Part 16 ===
No.	Title	Lyrics	Music	Artist	Length
1.	"Love Simply" (사랑도 단순하게)	7 Octave	7 Octave	J-Cera	3:43
2.	"Love Simply" (Inst.)		7 Octave		3:43
Total length:					7:26

=== Part 17 ===
No.	Title	Lyrics	Music	Artist	Length
1.	"It Went Without Sound" (소리 없이 간다)	Kim Kyeong-beom a/k/a As You Know (알고보니 혼수상태)	Kim Ji-hwan; Kim Kyeong-beom a/k/a As You Know (알고보니 혼수상태)	Choi Hyo-in feat. Gong Na-ri	4:03
2.	"It Went Without Sound" (Inst.)		Kim Ji-hwan; Kim Kyeong-beom a/k/a As You Know (알고보니 혼수상태)		4:03
Total length:					8:06

=== Part 18 ===
No.	Title	Lyrics	Music	Artist	Length
1.	"Lost Half" (반을 잃었다)	Jung Min-hye	Kwak Tae-hoon	AirManGirl	4:08
2.	"Lost Half" (Inst.)		Kwak Tae-hoon		4:08
Total length:					8:16

=== Part 19 ===
No.	Title	Lyrics	Music	Artist	Length
1.	"Rain's Melody" (비의 멜로디)	Park Jung-tae	Park Jung-tae	Kim Hyun-min	4:20
2.	"Rain's Melody" (Inst.)		Park Jung-tae		4:20
Total length:					8:40

=== Part 20 ===
No.	Title	Lyrics	Music	Artist	Length
1.	"For You"	Go Byung-sik a/k/a Koch; Kim Nam-won	Go Byung-sik a/k/a Koch; Kim Nam-won	Michelle Lee	3:37
2.	"For You" (Inst.)		Go Byung-sik a/k/a Koch; Kim Nam-won		3:37
Total length:					7:14

=== Part 21 ===
No.	Title	Lyrics	Music	Artist	Length
1.	"Wait for Spring" (봄을 기다려)	Go Byung-sik a/k/a Koch; Kim Nam-won	Go Byung-sik a/k/a Koch; Kim Nam-won	Romantic Punch	4:01
2.	"Wait for Spring" (Inst.)		Go Byung-sik a/k/a Koch; Kim Nam-won		4:01
Total length:					8:02

=== Part 22 ===
No.	Title	Lyrics	Music	Artist	Length
1.	"My Love Like a Tear" (눈물 같은 내 사랑아)	Miu	Miu; Kim Kyeong-beom a/k/a As You Know (알고보니 혼수상태)	Woo Eun-mi	4:55
2.	"My Love Like a Tear" (Inst.)		Miu; Kim Kyeong-beom a/k/a As You Know (알고보니 혼수상태)		4:56
Total length:					9:51

=== Part 23 ===
No.	Title	Lyrics	Music	Artist	Length
1.	"I Wanted To Say This" (이말 꼭 하고 싶었어)	Kim Sung-chae; Hwang Eun-ji	The Players (선수들)	TAESABIAE	3:59
2.	"I Wanted To Say This" (Inst.)		The Players (선수들)		3:59
Total length:					7:58

=== Part 24 ===
No.	Title	Lyrics	Music	Artist	Length
1.	"Like The First Day" (처음 그날처럼)	Jin Myung-yong	Jin Myung-yong; Choi Chang-guk	Moon Jun-young (ZE:A)	3:22
2.	"Like The First Day" (Inst.)		Jin Myung-yong; Choi Chang-guk		3:22
Total length:					6:44

=== Part 25 ===
No.	Title	Lyrics	Music	Artist	Length
1.	"Hope It's Not A Dream" (꿈이 아니길)	Kim Kyeong-beom a/k/a As You Know (알고보니 혼수상태); Park Mi-ju	Kim Kyeong-beom a/k/a As You Know (알고보니 혼수상태)	Kim Dae-hoon	3:26
2.	"Hope It's Not A Dream" (Inst.)		Kim Kyeong-beom a/k/a As You Know (알고보니 혼수상태)		3:26
Total length:					6:52

=== Part 26 ===
No.	Title	Lyrics	Music	Artist	Length
1.	"Magic"	Go Byung-sik a/k/a Koch	Go Byung-sik a/k/a Koch; Kim Nam-won	Tarin	3:22
2.	"Magic" (Inst.)		Go Byung-sik a/k/a Koch; Kim Nam-won		3:21
Total length:					6:43

== Awards and nominations ==
Year	Award	Category	Recipient	Result
2016	35th MBC Drama Awards	Excellence Award, Actor in a Serial Drama	Son Ho-jun	Won
2016	35th MBC Drama Awards	Excellence Award, Actor in a Serial Drama	Han Joo-wan	Nominated
2016	35th MBC Drama Awards	Excellence Award, Actress in a Serial Drama	Lim Ji-yeon	Won
2016	35th MBC Drama Awards	Golden Acting Award, Actor in a Serial Drama	Byun Hee-bong	Nominated
2016	35th MBC Drama Awards	Golden Acting Award, Actress in a Serial Drama	Im Soo-hyang	Nominated
2016	35th MBC Drama Awards	Best Young Actor	Yoon Chan-young	Nominated
2016	35th MBC Drama Awards	Best Young Actress	Lee Young-eun	Nominated
2017	36th MBC Drama Awards	Best Character Award, Best Villain	Geum Bo-ra	Nominated

== International broadcast ==
Country	Network	Airing dates
(Indonesia)	Oh!K	
(Hong Kong)	Oh!K	
(Singapore)	Oh!K	
(Taiwan)	Gala Television (GTV)	
Myanmar	MRTV-4	October 00, 2017 - November 00, 2017 (Every Monday to Friday 07:00 - 19:40)
