= My Fantastic Funeral =

- Genre: Melodrama, romance
- Written by: Kim Eun-hyang
- Directed by: Park Sun-ho
- Starring: Kyung Soo-jin; Choi Woo-shik
- Country of origin: South Korea
- Original language: Korean
- No. of episodes: 2

Production
- Production location: South Korea
- Running time: Saturday at 08:20 (KST)

Original release
- Network: SBS
- Release: September 26, 2015

My Fantastic Funeral (Korean: 나의 판타스틱한 장례식; RR: Naui pantaseutikhan jangnyesik) is a South Korean two-episodes television drama starring Kyung Soo-jin and Choi Woo-shik. It aired on September 26, 2015 as part of Chuseok Drama Special.

== Cast ==
- Kyung Soo-jin as Jang Mi-soo
- Choi Woo-shik as Park Dong-soo
- Yu Ha-jun as Yoo Se-ho
- Kim Chung as Mi-soo's mother
- Kim Min-ha as Da-eun Mi-soo's sister
- Han Sang-jin
- Seo Lee-sook as Young-ran
- Park Jin-joo as Na-rae
- Lee Dae-ro as Grandfather at pharmacy
