= Ruby Ring =

- Promotional poster
- Also known as: Ruby's Ring
- Genre: Melodrama; Revenge; Romance; Family
- Written by: Hwang Soon-young
- Directed by: Jeon San
- Starring: Lee So-yeon; Im Jung-eun; Kim Suk-hoon; Park Gwang-hyun
- Music by: Lee Chang-hee (music director)
- Country of origin: South Korea
- Original language: Korean
- No. of episodes: 93

Production
- Executive producer: Lee Jae-sang KBS
- Producer: Park Ki-ho
- Cinematography: Kwon Hyeok-gyun
- Editor: Han Man-woong
- Running time: 35 minutes from Mondays to Fridays at 19:45 (KST)
- Production companies: Jidam Inc. (formerly Yein E&M)

Original release
- Network: KBS2
- Release: 19 August 2013 – 3 January 2014

Ruby Ring (Korean: 루비 반지; RR: Rubi banji) is a 2013 South Korean television daily drama series starring Lee So-yeon, Im Jung-eun, Kim Suk-hoon and Park Gwang-hyun. It airs on KBS2 on Mondays to Fridays at 19:45 for 93 episodes beginning August 19, 2013.

== Plot ==
Ruby and Runa are twins, although one, unbeknownst to both, was adopted, and are one the opposite of the other: Ruby is responsible, obedient and kind, while Runa is manipulative, selfish and greedy. When Ruby announces her engagement to Bae Kyung-min, the jealousy Runa harbors for her sister sharpens: it has always been her dream to marry a rich man, but instead she remained pregnant with her boyfriend Na In-soo. Soon after, the two sisters have a car accident which disfigures them. Since Ruby's engagement ring and clothes are found on Runa, doctors reconstruct their faces swapping them. Runa has now the opportunity to live as Ruby, who, when she wakes up from a coma and discovers what her sister is doing and that In-soo, while knowing the truth, is not going to do anything, plans revenge.

== Cast ==
=== Main characters ===
- Lee So-yeon as the real Jung Ruby/Jung Runa
- Im Jung-eun as the real Jung Runa/Jung Ruby
- Kim Suk-hoon as Bae Kyung-min, Ruby's husband
- Park Gwang-hyun as Na In-soo, Runa's fiancé

=== Supporting characters ===
- Jung Ae-ri as Yoo Gil-ja, Ruby and Runa's mother
- Byun Jung-soo as Jung Cho-rim, Gil-ja's sister-in-law
- Jung Dong-hwan as Bae Chang-geun, Kyung-min's father
- Kim Seo-ra as Park Kyung-sook, Kyung-min's mother
- Kim Ga-yeon as Bae Se-ra, Kyung-min's sister
- Kim Young-ok as Jo Il-soon, Kyung-min's grandmother
- Ha Joo-hee as Seo Jin-hee, an office worker
- Lee Hyo-young as Hwang Seok-ho, an office worker
- Kim Gyeo-wool as Song Hye-ryun, an office worker
- Lee Hyun-woo as Noh Dong-pal, restaurant worker and Cho-rim's boyfriend
- Park Jin-joo as Go So-young, restaurant worker
- Han Kyung-sun as Jang Geum-hee, Kyung-min's housekeeper
- Bae Jung-ah as Lee Eun-ji, Ruby and Runa's friend

== Awards and nominations ==
Year	Award	Category	Recipient	Result
2013	KBS Drama Awards	Excellence Award, Actor in a Daily Drama	Kim Suk-hoon	Won
2013	KBS Drama Awards	Excellence Award, Actor in a Daily Drama	Park Gwang-hyun	Nominated
2013	KBS Drama Awards	Excellence Award, Actress in a Daily Drama	Lee So-yeon	Won
2013	KBS Drama Awards	Excellence Award, Actress in a Daily Drama	Im Jung-eun	Nominated

== International broadcast ==
Country	Network	Airing dates
South Korea	KBS2	August 19, 2013 – January 3, 2014 (KBS 2TV日日連續劇/한국방송공사 2TV 일일연속극)
Taiwan	GTV (八大戲劇台)	October 29, 2014 – December 18, 2014 (Monday to Friday 20:00 – 22:00, December 11 from 20:00 – 21:00)
Singapore	Hub VV Drama	April 24, 2015 – June 29, 2015 (Monday to Friday from 17:45 – 19:00)
Thailand	Channel 9 MCOT HD	August 12, 2016 – October 7, 2016, airing only 17 episodes (no airing episode) (Thursday and Friday from 09.30 to 10.30) second broadcasting every July 5, 2017 – August 3, 2017 (Wednesday, Thursday and Friday from 08.00 to 10.00) and repeats the third January 28, 2018 – April 6, 2018 (Every Monday to Friday from 23.05 to 23.50) (Thursday 22 February, 23 February, no broadcast due to broadcast live DARE TO DREAM LPGA THAILAND 2018 golf)
Vietnam	HTV2	July 17, 2017 - July 6, 2017 (Monday to Friday from 11:45 - 12:45)

Adaptations

A Ukrainian adaptation titled Obruchka z rubinom has been produced by Front Cinema Production and aired on Ukraina between 2 January and 25 May 2018. The Ukrainian version has also been broadcast in 2022 by Polish channel TV4.

An Indonesian adaptation of the series called Bawang Putih Berkulit Merah. It began airing on ANTV from 14 January 2020.

Nation TV Nairobi Kenya
