= Hello My Teacher =

2005 South Korean television series

- Promotional poster
- Also known as: Biscuit Teacher and Star Candy; Hardtack Teacher and Sugar Candy
- Written by: Park Kye-ok; Kim Jung-ah
- Directed by: Oh Jong-rok; Kim Hyung-shik
- Starring: Gong Hyo-jin; Gong Yoo; Kim Da-hyun; Choi Yeo-jin
- Country of origin: South Korea
- No. of episodes: 16

Production
- Executive producers: Moon Jung-soo; Teddy Hoon-tak Jung; Jang Jin-wook
- Producers: Kim Yang; Noh Jun-kyu
- Running time: Wednesdays and Thursdays at 21:55
- Production company: SidusHQ

Original release
- Network: SBS
- Release: April 13 – June 2, 2005

Hello My Teacher (Korean: 건빵선생과 별사탕; RR: Geonppangseonsaenggwa byeolsatang; lit. Biscuit Teacher and Star Candy) is a 2005 South Korean television series starring Gong Hyo-jin, Gong Yoo, Kim Da-hyun, and Choi Yeo-jin. It aired on SBS from April 13 to June 2, 2005 on Wednesdays and Thursdays at 21:55 for 16 episodes.

== Synopsis ==
Na Bo-ri (Gong Hyo-jin) is a 25-year-old woman who desperately wants to be a teacher at the high school she was kicked out of due to a misunderstanding with her teachers over injuring a group of male classmates (she had been a legend there for being a troublemaker and getting into fights). After overcoming numerous hardships and getting her high-school equivalency certification, she rejects job offers from other high schools and works on becoming a substitute teacher at her old high school so she can work side by side with her longtime high school crush, the art teacher Ji Hyun-woo (Kim Da-hyun).

However, the only thing that enables her to get the coveted job is by signing a contract to essentially babysit Park Tae-in (Gong Yoo), a troublemaker who attends the same high school. Tae-in, a lonely 20-year-old youth, quickly becomes the "jjang", or "king" of the high school, and enjoys playing mean tricks on Bo-ri whose tough but easygoing personality attracts the majority of her students. As his relationship with his teacher takes a turn for the worse, Tae-in gradually becomes attracted to her through a series of complicated events. Noh Jem-ma (Choi Yeo-jin) is jealous of the relationship between Bo-ri and Tae-in, and goes out of her way to get Bo-ri kicked out but she's not the only one against them.

== Cast ==
=== Main ===
- Gong Hyo-jin as Na Bo-ri
- Gong Yoo as Park Tae-in
- Kim Da-hyun as Ji Hyun-woo
- Choi Yeo-jin as Noh Jem-ma

=== Supporting ===
==== Family members ====
- Lee Yoon-ji as Na Seon-jae (Bo-ri's younger sister)
- Yang Geum-seok as Ji Young-ae (Tae-in's stepmother)
- Lee Hyo-jung as Park Joong-seop (Tae-in's father)
- Oh Yoon-ah as Chae Eun-seong
- Geum Bo-ra as Bae Yi-da (Bo-ri's mother)
- Seo Jun-young as Park Jae-in (Tae-in's half-brother)
- Lee Jae-yong as monk (Bo-ri's father)

==== Teachers ====
- Jo Hyung-ki as Dong Chil-hwan (principal)
- Park In-hwan as Hwang Gap-soo (Homeroom teacher)
- Jo Sang-ki as Nam Seong-ki (Biology teacher)
- Kim Yoon-kyung as Oh Joo-yeon (English teacher)
- Hyun Young as Jo Ji-ah (PE teacher)
- Jeon Jae-hyung

==== Students ====
- Jung Eui-chul as Choi Chang-il
- Jung Gyu-woon as Lee Ho-joon
- Go Joon-hee^{1} as Kim Sun-ah
- Jang Hee-jin as Oh Eun-byul
- Kang Do-han as Lee Yoo-jin
- Yang Joo-ho as Kim Yeong-song
- Lee Eun as Yeo Se-ra
- Jo Han-na as Bae Pil-soon
- Cha Seo-rin as Lee Hye-bin
- Shin Ah as Kang Ri-ping
- Park Ki-young as Bang Soo-hyun
- Shin Hyun-tak as Park Man-chang
- Ki Moo as Choi Hoon
- Jang Ji-woo as Lee Jang-baek
- Nam Chang-hee as Kim Baek-joon
- Song Jin-yeong as Jo Pil
- Yoo Da-in as Da-in
- Park Hyo-jun as Oh Sang-tae
- Hahm Eun-jung as suicidal honor student
- Kim Hwa-joo

== Notes ==
- ^{1}Credited as Kim Eun-joo.
