= Park Gwang-hyun =

South Korean actor and singer

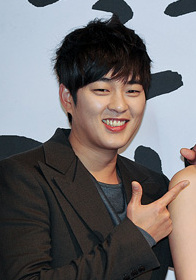
- Park in January 2012
- Born: October 11, 1977 (age 49); Seoul, South Korea
- Education: Kwandong University – BS/MS in Civil Engineering; Hannam University – PhD in Physical Education
- Occupations: Actor; singer
- Years active: 1997–present
- Agent: FNC Entertainment

Korean name
- Hangul: 박광현
- Hanja: 朴珖賢
- RR: Bak Gwanghyeon
- MR: Pak Kwanghyŏn

Park Gwang-hyun (born October 11, 1977) is a South Korean actor and singer. After winning the 1997 SBS Top Talent Competition, Park has appeared in television dramas, notably The Bean Chaff of My Life (2003), Sweet Buns (2004), Pink Lipstick (2010), Glowing She (2012), and Ruby Ring (2013). In 2012, he made his musical theatre debut with Catch Me If You Can, followed by The Scarlet Pimpernel and Summer Snow in 2013.

== Personal life ==
On December 7, 2014, Park married his non-celebrity wife. They have a daughter, Ha-on.

== Filmography ==
=== Television series ===
| Year | Title | Role | Network |
|---|---|---|---|
| 1997 | Women | Seo Geol-nam | SBS |
| 1998 | How Am I | Park Yoon-ho | SBS |
| 1999 | The Boss | Myung-tae | MBC |
| 1999 | Jump | Park Gwang-hyun | SBS |
| 2000 | School 3 | Lee Se-chan | KBS1 |
| 2000 | RNA | Lee Tae-young | KBS2 |
| 2000 | Medical Center | Kang Ji-tae | SBS |
| 2001 | MBC Best Theater "Bachelor Party" | | MBC |
| 2001 | Tender Hearts | Park Yoon-ho | KBS1 |
| 2001 | New Nonstop | | MBC |
| 2002 | Sunlight Upon Me | Lee Han-soo | MBC |
| 2002 | Bad Girls | Kim Shin-ho | SBS |
| 2003 | The Bean Chaff of My Life | Seo Kyung-soo | MBC |
| 2004 | Sweet Buns | Ahn Nam-joon | MBC |
| 2007 | Couple Breaking | Lee Jung-seok | CGV |
| 2008 | Chosun Police 2 | Sunwoo Hyun | MBC Dramanet |
| 2009 | Can Anyone Love | Lee Soon-shin | SBS |
| 2009 | Swallow the Sun | young Hyun Ki-sang | SBS |
| 2010 | Pink Lipstick | Ha Jae-bum | MBC |
| 2011 | Welcome to the Show | PD | SBS |
| 2012 | Glowing She | Noh Yong-woo | KBS Drama |
| 2012 | Cheongdam-dong Alice | Heo Dong-wook | SBS |
| 2013 | Ruby Ring | Na In-soo | KBS2 |
| 2014 | Shining Romance | Han Sang-wook | MBC |
| 2014 | My Marriage Expedition | | KBS2 |
| 2017 | Band of Sisters | Choo Tae-soo | SBS |
| 2018 | Love to the End | Han Doo-young | KBS2 |

=== Film ===
| Year | Title | Role |
|---|---|---|
| 2002 | Dig or Die | Woo-jin |
| 2010 | 고치방 | Kim Ji-hoon |

=== Variety show ===
| Year | Title | Network | Notes/Ref. |
|---|---|---|---|
| 2013 | Cheongdam-dong 111 | tvN | |
| 2021 | Star Golf Big League | tvN D | Cast Member |

=== Music video appearances ===
| Year | Song title | Artist |
|---|---|---|
| 2011 | "One Person" | Sung Yu-ri |

== Musical theatre ==
| Year | Title | Role |
|---|---|---|
| 2012–2013 | Catch Me If You Can | Frank Abagnale Jr. |
| 2013 | The Scarlet Pimpernel | Percy Blakeney/The Scarlet Pimpernel |
| 2013 | Summer Snow | Yoon-jae (based on Tachibana Seiji) |

== Discography ==
| Album information | Track listing |
|---|---|
| 鼻笑 (비소): Album; Artist: Park Gwang-hyun; Released: October 30, 2002; Label: Jave | Track listing: 1. Prologue; 2. 鼻笑 (비소); 3. 그때까지; 4. 無言 (무언); 5. Remember Today; 6. 떨림; 7. 後愛 (후애); 8. 설레임; 9. 그땐 널 10. Winter Story (冬話); 11. 그래요; 12. 제발가; 13. 鼻笑 (비소) (Remix) |
| The Bean Chaff of My Life OST: Various artists; Four tracks by Park Gwang-hyun; Released: April 29, 2003; Label: Doremi | Track listing: 1. 내 인생의 콩깍지 (T.R. ver.); 2. 그 남자 그 여자 (with So Yoo-jin); 3. 경수는 헷갈리네; 4. 오늘밤 어때? |
| The Day: Album; Artist: Park Gwang-hyun; Released: November 13, 2003; Label: BMG Korea | Track listing: 1. 위로 [Consolation]; 2. Forever; 3. 그래요 (Pop Version); 4. Remember Today; 5. 거짓말; 6. 떨림; 7. 크리스마스에는; 8. Winter Story; 9. 제발가; 10. 비소 (Club Remix); 11. Forever (Instrumental) |

== Awards and nominations ==
| Year | Award | Category | Nominated work | Result |
|---|---|---|---|---|
| 1997 | SBS Top Talent Competition | Gold Award | —N/a | Won |
| 2000 | KBS Drama Awards | Best New Actor | RNA, School 3 | Won |
| 2013 | KBS Drama Awards | Excellence Award, Actor in a Daily Drama | Ruby Ring | Nominated |
