= Lee Yoon-ji =

South Korean actress (born 1984)

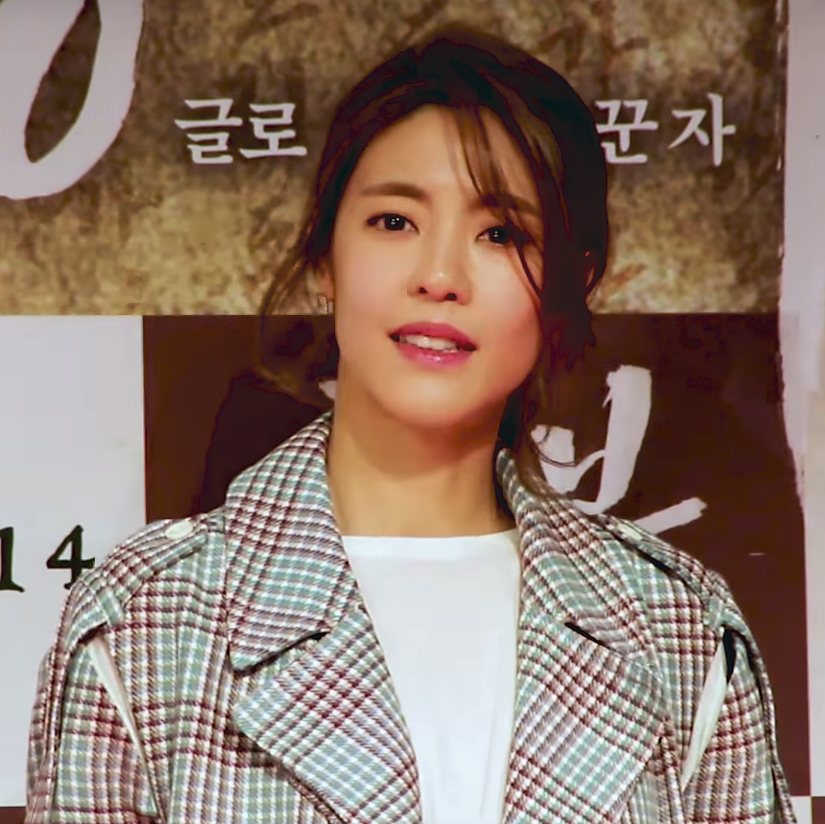
- Lee in February 2018
- Born: March 15, 1984 (age 42); Mapo District, Seoul, South Korea
- Education: Chung-Ang University – Theatre and Film (Bachelor's and Master's degree)
- Occupation: Actress
- Years active: 2003–present
- Agent: Namoo Actors
- Spouse: Jeong Han-wool (m. 2014)
- Children: 2

Korean name
- Hangul: 이윤지
- Hanja: 李允芝
- RR: I Yunji
- MR: I Yunji

Lee Yoon-ji (Korean: 이윤지; born March 15, 1984) is a South Korean actress. After making her acting debut in the sitcom Nonstop 4, Lee has starred in the television series Pure 19 (2004), Princess Hours (2006), Dream High (2011), The King 2 Hearts (2012), and Wang's Family (2013). She also appeared in season 1 reality-variety show We Got Married (2008–2009), as well as the romantic comedy film Couples (2011).

== Career ==
Lee made her acting debut in 2003 on the MBC sitcom Nonstop 4. She has since starred in many small screen projects such as Pure 19 (KBS, 2004), Princess Hours (MBC, 2006), The Great King, Sejong (KBS, 2008), Dream High (KBS, 2011), The King 2 Hearts (MBC, 2012), and The Great Seer (SBS, 2012).

The same year she was hosting the entertainment news program Entertainment Weekly on KBS, Lee was also partnered with Super Junior member Kang-in in season 1 of the reality show We Got Married. She made her theater debut in the 2010 Korean staging of the Pulitzer Prize-winning play Proof.

In 2011 Lee landed her first big-screen leading role in romantic comedy Couples.

She, Danny Park and Kim Eui-sung starred in 992, a 13-minute film made by Wonsuk Chin using the iPhone 4S. The short, which premiered at the 2012 Macworld and was streamed on YouTube, is named after the New Balance running shoes favored by the late Apple CEO Steve Jobs.

Lee stepped in to host the SBS talk show Healing Camp, Aren't You Happy for one episode, after the father of friend and agency mate Han Hye-jin died in November 2012.

From 2013 to 2014, Lee played one of the leading roles in Wang's Family, an ensemble family drama that received high ratings, peaking at 48.3%. She next starred in police procedural Dr. Frost (2014) and romantic comedy Ex-Girlfriends' Club.

== Personal life ==
=== Marriage and family ===
Lee married a dentist on September 27, 2014, at the 63 Building in Yeouido, Seoul. On October 7, 2015, Lee gave birth to their daughter.

=== Religion ===
A devout Roman Catholic who attends Mass every Sunday, Lee said in an interview in 2010: "Faith is a joyful thing for me, and it's a normal part of everyday life. I can't explain my particular experience of faith, and I always feel God's presence." Her baptismal name is Maria. In 2014, Lee was chosen as the ambassador for the Catholic Film Festival, and was one of 50 Catholic celebrities who appeared in the 2014 music video for the digital single "Koinonia" to commemorate Pope Francis' visit to South Korea.

== Filmography ==
=== Film ===
Year	Title	Role	Notes/Ref.
2004	Dead Friend	Eun-jung	
2011	Social Network Interaction Movie - Episode X3	Ray	BMW Korea short film
2011	Couples	Ae-yeon	
2012	992		short film
2022	Good Morning	Jin-ah	
2023	Dream Palace	Su-in	

=== Television series ===
Year	Title	Role
2003	Nonstop 4	Lee Yoon-ji
2004	Han River Ballad	Yoon Da-young
2005	Hello My Teacher	Na Seon-jae
2005	Sisters of the Sea	Song Choon-hee
2006	Princess Hours	Princess Hye-myung
2006	Hearts of Nineteen	Park Yoon-jung
2007	By My Side	Seo Eun-joo
2008	The Great King, Sejong	Queen Soheon
2008	HDTV Literature: "Spring, Spring Spring"	Hye-eun
2009	Children of Heaven	Yoon Sa-rang
2009	Heading to the Ground	Oh Yeon-yi
2010	John and Rugalda, Two Virgin Spouses	Lee Soon-yi/Rugalda
2010	Blossom Sisters	Park Hye-won
2011	Dream High	Shi Kyung-jin
2011	KBS Drama Special: "Terminal"	Yeon-soo
2012	The King 2 Hearts	Lee Jae-shin
2012	The Great Seer	Ban-ya
2013	Dating Agency: Cyrano	Ma Jae-in (guest, episodes 1-3)
2013	Wang's Family	Wang Gwang-bak
2014	KBS Drama Special: "That Kind of Love"	Yeon-soo
2014	Dr. Frost	Song Sun
2015	Ex-Girlfriends' Club	Jang Hwa-young
2016–2017	Person Who Gives Happiness	Im Eun-hee
2017	Revolutionary Love	Cameo, episode 1
2018	The Third Charm	Baek Joo-ran
2022	Extraordinary Attorney Woo	Choi Ji-soo Cameo, episode 13–14,16
2023	My Demon	Noh Soo-an

=== Web series ===
Year	Title	Role	Ref.
2022	Mimicus	Lee Mi-yeon	

=== Variety shows ===
Year	Title	Notes/Ref.
2003	Declaration of Freedom Saturday Big Operation - Rose War	
2008–2009	We Got Married Season 1	Cast (episodes 39-55)
2008–2010	Entertainment Weekly	Host;
2009	Love Tree 36.5	
2009	Big Star X-File	
2013	Miss Korea	Host
2021–present	Oh Eun-young's Golden Counseling Center	Host
2021	All That Muse	Cast
2022	Restaurant in Line	Special MC

=== Music video appearances ===
Year	Title	Artist
2007	"Misery"	Bay

=== Radio shows ===
Year	Title	Role	Notes	Ref.
2022	This Morning, This is Jeong Ji-young	Special DJ	December 19–25	

== Theater ==
Year	Title	Role	Ref.
2010	Proof	Catherine	
2021–2022	Understudy	Roxanne	

== Discography ==
=== Soundtrack appearances ===
Year	Song title	Notes/Ref.
2003	"Happy Days"	Nonstop 4 OST
2006	"Here Comes Love"	Pure 19 OST
2010	"Snow Falling in My Heart"	Love Tree Project
2011	"Our Love Shines" (sung with Gong Hyung-jin, Kim Joo-hyuk, Lee Si-young, Oh Jung-se)	Couples OST
2012	"I Long for You"	The Great Seer OST
2012	"First Love"	The King 2 Hearts OST
2014	"That Person" (duet with Han Joo-wan)	Wang's Family OST

== Awards and nominations ==
Year presented, name of the award ceremony, category, nominated work and the result of the nomination
Year	Award	Category	Nominated work	Result
2005	MBC Drama Awards	Best New Actress	Sisters of the Sea	Nominated
2006	KBS Drama Awards	Best New Actress	Pure 19	Won
2007	MBC Drama Awards	Golden Acting Award, Actress in a Serial Drama	By My Side	Won
2008	KBS Drama Awards	Excellence Award, Actress in a Serial Drama	The Great King, Sejong	Won
2008	KBS Drama Awards	Excellence Award, Actress in a One-Act Drama/Special	Spring, Spring Spring	Nominated
2011	19th Korean Culture and Entertainment Awards	Best Actress	Couples	Won
2011	4th Korea Drama Awards	Best Supporting Actress	Dream High	Nominated
2011	KBS Drama Awards	Best Supporting Actress	Dream High	Won
2012	1st K-Drama Star Awards	Acting Award, Actress	The King 2 Hearts	Nominated
2012	MBC Drama Awards	Excellence Award, Actress in a Miniseries	The King 2 Hearts	Won
2012	SBS Drama Awards	Excellence Award, Actress in a Drama Special	The Great Seer	Nominated
2013	KBS Drama Awards	Excellence Award, Actress in a Serial Drama	Wang's Family	Nominated
2013	KBS Drama Awards	Best Couple Award with Han Joo-wan	Wang's Family	Nominated
2017	MBC Drama Awards	Top Excellence Award, Actress in a Soap Opera	Person Who Gives Happiness	Nominated
2023	43rd Korean Association of Film Critics Awards	Best Supporting Actress	Dream Palace	Won
2023	43rd Golden Cinema Film Festival	Best Supporting Actress	Dream Palace	Won
2023	44th Blue Dragon Film Awards	Best Supporting Actress	Dream Palace	Nominated
2023	2023 SBS Drama Awards	Best Supporting Actress in a Miniseries Romance/Comedy Drama	My Demon	Nominated
