= Geum Bo-ra =

South Korean actress (born 1961)

- Born: Son Mi-ja; February 21, 1961 (age 65); Dangjin, South Korea
- Education: Anyang High School of Film and Arts
- Occupation: Actress
- Years active: 1979–present
- Agent: Raisin Entertainment
- Spouse: Oh Jae-hee (m. 1989; div. 2002) Kim Seong-taek (m. 2005)
- Children: 3

Korean name
- Hangul: 손미자
- Hanja: 孫美子
- RR: Son Mija
- MR: Son Mija

Stage name
- Hangul: 금보라
- Hanja: 琴寶羅
- RR: Geum Bora
- MR: Kŭm Pora

Geum Bo-ra (Korean: 금보라; born February 21, 1961), birth name Son Mi-ja (손미자), is a South Korean actress. She made her acting debut in 1979, and won Best New Actress at the 1980 Grand Bell Awards for Water Spray. She was active in Korean cinema in the 1980s, and when she grew older, switched to supporting roles in television.

Geum married businessman Oh Jae-hee in 1989, but financial problems led to their divorce in 2002. They have three sons: former Yonsei University basketball player Oh Seung-jun, Oh Seung-min, and a third son. She remarried in November 2005 to widowed businessman Kim Seong-taek, and one of her two stepdaughters is Kim Hyeon-jin.

== Filmography ==
=== Film ===
Year	Title	Role
1979	The Rain at Night	
1980	Water Spray	
1981	White Smile	
1981	A Small Ball Shot by a Midget	Young-hee
1981	The Maiden Who Went to the City	
1982	The Blues of Jong-ro	
1983	The Lover of a Friend	
1984	The Foolish Woman	
1985	Dreams of the Strong	Oh Ae-ja
1986	Keum Dal-rae	
1986	Sleeping in a Swamp of Angels	
1987	Blue Heart	
1989	The Wolf's Curiosity Stole Pigeons	Sook-hee
1993	A Honeymoon Trip	Kyeong-a
2002	Conduct Zero	Joong-pil's mother
2004	A Wacky Switch	Doctor (cameo)
2005	Daddy-Long-Legs	Mi-hyun
2005	The Art of Seduction	Ms. Jung (cameo)
2011	Sunny	Past photo (cameo)

=== Television series ===
Year	Title	Role
1981	Korea Fantasy	Ahn Ik-tae's first love
1982	Barefoot Glory	Nam Sung-yong's lover
1982	Ordinary People	Byul Nyeo
1983	Foundation of the Kingdom	Ban-ya
1983	Fog	
1984	Labyrinth	
1984	Bride Lessons	
1984	Fireworks Display	Kyung-ae
1985	Silver Rapids	
1986	Far Away People	Han Deok-soo's daughter
1986	Im Illera Im Illera	Yoon Young-shil
1987	KBS TV Novel: "Pearl Tower"	
1993	Wangsibri	Jung-hee
1996	LA Arirang	
1996	Colors	
1997	The Reason I Live	Mrs. Han
1998	Legendary Ambition	
1998	Seven Brides	
1998	KBS TV Novel: "Eun-ah's Daughter"	Eun-ah's aunt
1999	Assignable Appearance	
2000	Taejo Wang Geon	Queen Park
2000	It's Half	Kim Sun-hee
2000	Cheers for Women	
2001	Fox and Cotton Candy	Sung Gu-ae
2002	The Story of Two Men	
2002	Golden Wagon	Hwang Min-ja
2003	Jewel in the Palace	Na Joo-daek
2004	Match Made in Heaven	Eun-sun's mother
2004	Traveling Women	Song-yi's mother
2005	Hello My Teacher	Bae Yi-da
2005	Princess Lulu	Mrs. Park
2005	Let's Get Married	Kwan Eun-sun's mother
2005	Don't Worry	Hong Yeon-hwa
2006	Spring Waltz	Hyun Ji-sook
2006	Bad Family	Uhm Ji-sook
2006	Love Truly	Lee Han-sook
2007	By My Side	Yoo Il-shim
2007	Que Sera Sera	Ji Kyung-sook
2008	Spotlight	Seo Woo-jin's mother
2008	Temptation of Wife	Baek Mi-in
2009	Strike Love	Choi Eom-ji's mother
2009	Creating Destiny	Shin Jin-hee
2010	Jejungwon	Yoo Seok-ran's mother
2012	Welcome Rain to My Life	Oh Min-ah
2012	May Queen	Jo Dal-soon
2012	Only Because It's You	Yoon Gong-ja's mother-in-law (cameo)
2013	Pots of Gold	Min Young-ae
2013	Potato Star 2013QR3	Wang Yoo-jung
2013	Hold My Hand	Kang Yang-soon
2014	Jang Bo-ri Is Here!	Lee Hwa-yeon
2015	My Heart Twinkle Twinkle	Hwang Mi-ja
2015	The Producers	Herself (cameo, episodes 1-2)
2015	Eve's Love	Mo Hwa-kyung
2016	Blow Breeze	Hwang Geum-sil
2017	Enemies from the Past	Oh Sa-ra
2018	Nice Witch	Byun Ok-jung
2021	The All-Round Wife	Dook Na-ra
2025	Marie and Her Three Daddies	Yoon Soon-ae

=== Variety shows ===
Year	Title	Notes
2008	Interview Game	
2008	I Need a Family - Season 2	
2014	Fox-ya	
2014	Real Mother Theatre	

== Awards and nominations ==
Year	Award	Category	Nominated work	Result
1980	19th Grand Bell Awards	Best New Actress	Water Spray	Won
2009	17th SBS Drama Awards	Best Supporting Actress in a Serial Drama	Temptation of Wife	Nominated
2013	32nd MBC Drama Awards	Golden Acting Award, Actress	Pots of Gold	Nominated
2017	36th MBC Drama Awards	Best Character Award, Best Villain	Blow Breeze	Nominated
