= Wang's Family =

South Korean television series

- Promotional poster
- Also known as: King's Family; The Wang Family
- Hangul: 왕가네 식구들
- RR: Wanggane sikgudeul
- MR: Wanggane sikkudŭl
- Genre: Family; Romance; Comedy; Drama
- Developed by: KBS Drama Division (planning)
- Written by: Moon Young-nam
- Directed by: Jin Hyung-wook
- Starring: Oh Hyun-kyung; Lee Tae-ran; Lee Yoon-ji; Jo Sung-ha; Oh Man-seok; Han Joo-wan
- Composer: Uhm Gi-yeob
- Country of origin: South Korea
- Original language: Korean
- No. of episodes: 50

Production
- Executive producers: Moon Bo-hyun (KBS); Kyung Myung-chul; Park Jae-sam
- Producers: Song Hyun-wook; Park Hyun-sook
- Cinematography: Han Dong-gyeon
- Editor: Oh Sang-hwan
- Production companies: Celltrion Entertainment (formerly Dream E&M)

Original release
- Network: KBS2
- Release: 31 August 2013 – 16 February 2014

Wang's Family (Korean: 왕가네 식구들) is a 2013 South Korean television series starring Oh Hyun-kyung, Lee Tae-ran, Lee Yoon-ji, Jo Sung-ha, Oh Man-seok and Han Joo-wan. It aired on KBS2 from August 31, 2013 to February 16, 2014 on Saturdays and Sundays at 19:55 for 50 episodes.

== Plot ==
Wang Su-bak, the eldest daughter of the Wang family, had married into a wealthy family, but after her husband Go Min-joong goes bankrupt, she and her family have to move back into her parents' home.

The second daughter Ho-bak is also having financial difficulties with her jobless husband Heo Se-dal, while the third daughter Gwang-bak suddenly decides to quit her stable job as a teacher to pursue her dream of becoming a writer.

The Wang family must now face a number of challenges in Korean society, such as elitism, discrimination, the power dynamics between husband & wife and between parent & child, and the decision of when to marry & have a child.

== Cast ==
=== Main cast ===
Cast	Character	Description
Oh Hyun-kyung	Wang Su-bak	Eldest daughter of Wang Bong; Wife of Go Min-joong; Was Miss Korea pageant contestant Mother of Ae-ji and Jung-ji
Jo Sung-ha	Go Min-joong	Husband of Wang Su-bak; Was wealthy but went bankrupt then starts delivery business A filial son towards his father Ex-boyfriend of Oh Soon-jung; Biological father of Mi-ho
Lee Tae-ran	Wang Ho-bak	Second daughter of Wang Bong; Was mistreated by her mother since she was young Wife of Heo Se-dal; Mother of Shin-tong and Bang-tong
Oh Man-seok	Heo Se-dal	Husband of Ho-bak; Son of Park Sal-ra; Elder brother of Young-dal; Good friend of Wang Don; Unemployed at the start, meets the hotel director and has an affair with her
Lee Yoon-ji	Wang Gwang-bak	Third daughter of Wang Bong; Girlfriend of Choi Sang-nam; Previously a teacher but resigns to be a writer
Han Joo-wan	Choi Sang-nam	Son of Choi Dae-se; Likes Gwang-bak; Tries breaking up with Gwang-bak because her family despises him as he is a high school dropout Has a lot of knowledge and life experience A contractor

=== Wang Family ===
Cast	Character	Description
Na Moon-hee	Ahn Gye-shim	Mother of Wang Bong and Wang Don
Jang Yong	Wang Bong	Husband of Lee Ang-geum
Kim Hae-sook	Lee Ang-geum	Wife of Wang Bong
Choi Dae-chul	Wang Don	Younger brother of Wang Bong; Likes Heo Young-dal
Moon Ga-young	Wang Hae-bak	Fourth daughter of Wang Bong; A good student who wishes to be a captain
Choi Won-hong	Wang Dae-bak	Only son of Wang Bong; Had no dreams in life until he met Choi Sang-nam; Boyfriend of Mi-ho

=== Go Family ===
Cast	Character	Description
Roh Joo-hyun	Go Ji-shik	Father of Min-joong
Kim Mi-ra	Go Min-sook	Sister of Min-joong
Lee Ye-seon	Go Ae-ji	Daughter of Min-joong & Su-bak
Jung Ji-yeon	Go Jung-ji	Son of Min-joong & Su-bak

=== Heo Family ===
Cast	Character	Description
Lee Bo-hee	Park Sal-ra	Mother of Se-dal and Young-dal; Was said to run a beauty salon in Myeongdong at first, opens a hair salon in the neighborhood, and later opens a cosmetic shop with her daughter
Kang Ye-bin	Heo Young-dal	Daughter of Park Sal-ra; is a typical Barbie Doll inside out; has affection for Choi Sang-nam as she is attracted to rich men. However, after Sang-nam marries Gwang-bak, she develops feelings for and eventually marries Wang Don.
Lee Tae-woo	Heo Shin-tong	Son of Se-dal & Ho-bak
Hong Hyun-taek	Heo Bang-tong	Son of Se-dal & Ho-bak

=== Choi Family ===
Cast	Character	Description
Lee Byung-joon	Choi Dae-se	Father of Choi Sang-nam; Was enemies with Gwang-bak at first Prohibits son from dating with Gwang-bak as he sees her as a rude girl Failed in his marriage as his wife, Soon-jung's sister was a compulsive gambler Has feelings for Park Sal-ra
Kim Hee-jung	Oh Soon-jung	Aunt of Choi Sang-nam; Previously dated Min-joong; Mother of Mi-ho; Housekeeper of brother-in-law Dae-se's house Was forced to break up with Min-joong as she needed to marry a rich old man to help repay her sister's gambling debts
Yoon Song-yi	Goo Mi-ho	Daughter of Soon-jung; Girlfriend of Dae-bak; Biological daughter of Min-joong

=== Extended Cast ===
Cast	Character	Description
Yoo Seung-bong	Joo Jang-bi	Dae-se's good friend
Kim Yoon-kyung	Eun Mi-ran	Woman who Se-dal had affair with
Choi Jae-woong	Ho Nam-hyung	Wang Bong's ex-student
Lee Sang-sook	Oh Man-jung	Mother of Sang-nam
Kim Min-hee	Editor Lee Kyung-ah	Magazine Editor
Seo Jun-young	Fake blind date man	Gwang-bak's primary school classmate
Han Hye-rin	Baek Ji-hwa	Sang-nam's fiancé

== Ratings ==
Episode ratings for KBS2 drama Wang's Family

Date	Episode	Average audience share			
Date	Episode	TNmS Ratings		AGB Nielsen	
Date	Episode	Nationwide	Seoul National Capital Area	Nationwide	Seoul National Capital Area
2013-08-31	01	20.2 (1st)	19.5 (2nd)	19.7 (1st)	20.5 (2nd)
2013-09-01	02	21.9 (1st)	21.4 (2nd)	23.8 (1st)	24.9 (1st)
2013-09-07	03	21.5 (1st)	21.5 (2nd)	21.2 (1st)	21.7 (2nd)
2013-09-08	04	23.6 (1st)	24.5 (1st)	24.6 (1st)	25.8 (1st)
2013-09-14	05	21.8 (1st)	21.6 (2nd)	22.3 (1st)	22.7 (2nd)
2013-09-15	06	24.8 (1st)	25.8 (1st)	24.7 (1st)	26.5 (1st)
2013-09-21	07	23.1 (1st)	23.0 (2nd)	22.1 (1st)	21.6 (1st)
2013-09-22	08	24.6 (1st)	25.5 (1st)	27.5 (1st)	28.6 (1st)
2013-09-28	09	26.4 (1st)	28.0 (1st)	26.3 (1st)	26.6 (1st)
2013-09-29	10	28.3 (1st)	30.6 (1st)	30.3 (1st)	32.2 (1st)
2013-10-05	11	25.0 (1st)	25.3 (1st)	25.3 (1st)	24.9 (1st)
2013-10-06	12	27.6 (1st)	28.9 (1st)	29.8 (1st)	30.6 (1st)
2013-10-12	13	23.6 (1st)	25.1 (1st)	23.1 (1st)	22.3 (1st)
2013-10-13	14	29.1 (1st)	29.4 (1st)	30.4 (1st)	31.1 (1st)
2013-10-19	15	27.0 (1st)	27.5 (1st)	26.1 (1st)	26.3 (1st)
2013-10-20	16	29.7 (1st)	30.8 (1st)	30.5 (1st)	30.7 (1st)
2013-10-26	17	27.9 (1st)	27.8 (1st)	26.7 (1st)	27.2 (1st)
2013-10-27	18	30.7 (1st)	32.2 (1st)	32.3 (1st)	32.9 (1st)
2013-11-02	19	28.3 (1st)	29.6 (1st)	28.2 (1st)	29.4 (1st)
2013-11-03	20	30.4 (1st)	32.5 (1st)	32.9 (1st)	33.1 (1st)
2013-11-09	21	28.3 (1st)	29.8 (1st)	29.5 (1st)	29.2 (1st)
2013-11-10	22	32.5 (1st)	35.1 (1st)	33.1 (1st)	33.9 (1st)
2013-11-16	23	27.2 (1st)	27.9 (1st)	28.3 (1st)	28.8 (1st)
2013-11-17	24	32.2 (1st)	32.3 (1st)	32.5 (1st)	32.7 (1st)
2013-11-23	25	33.7 (1st)	35.3 (1st)	29.2 (1st)	29.4 (1st)
2013-11-24	26	29.7 (1st)	30.8 (1st)	32.3 (1st)	31.9 (1st)
2013-11-30	27	32.0 (1st)	33.8 (1st)	29.5 (1st)	29.9 (1st)
2013-12-01	28	34.8 (1st)	36.0 (1st)	34.9 (1st)	35.5 (1st)
2013-12-07	29	32.1 (1st)	33.7 (1st)	30.6 (1st)	31.0 (1st)
2013-12-08	30	36.1 (1st)	37.5 (1st)	37.9 (1st)	39.6 (1st)
2013-12-14	31	33.3 (1st)	36.7 (1st)	33.4 (1st)	34.0 (1st)
2013-12-15	32	37.6 (1st)	40.7 (1st)	36.9 (1st)	37.2 (1st)
2013-12-21	33	32.7 (1st)	34.3 (1st)	32.4 (1st)	33.3 (1st)
2013-12-22	34	38.1 (1st)	38.7 (1st)	39.1 (1st)	39.9 (1st)
2013-12-28	35	33.3 (1st)	34.3 (1st)	34.1 (1st)	34.8 (1st)
2013-12-29	36	37.5 (1st)	39.9 (1st)	40.0 (1st)	41.2 (1st)
2014-01-04	37	35.2 (1st)	39.1 (1st)	36.2 (1st)	35.5 (1st)
2014-01-05	38	38.0 (1st)	41.5 (1st)	40.7 (1st)	40.8 (1st)
2014-01-11	39	36.7 (1st)	39.5 (1st)	37.6 (1st)	38.5 (1st)
2014-01-12	40	42.3 (1st)	45.9 (1st)	43.2 (1st)	44.9 (1st)
2014-01-18	41	37.7 (1st)	41.1 (1st)	39.7 (1st)	39.7 (1st)
2014-01-19	42	42.9 (1st)	46.0 (1st)	43.9 (1st)	44.8 (1st)
2014-01-25	43	42.3 (1st)	45.7 (1st)	41.2 (1st)	41.8 (1st)
2014-01-26	44	45.3 (1st)	48.5 (1st)	46.7 (1st)	47.1 (1st)
2014-02-01	45	42.3 (1st)	44.3 (1st)	39.3 (1st)	38.2 (1st)
2014-02-02	46	46.6 (1st)	49.5 (1st)	46.2 (1st)	46.6 (1st)
2014-02-08	47	42.3 (1st)	45.5 (1st)	41.3 (1st)	41.2 (1st)
2014-02-09	48	46.8 (1st)	50.3 (1st)	48.3 (1st)	49.9 (1st)
2014-02-15	49	37.2 (1st)	39.8 (1st)	38.3 (1st)	38.5 (1st)
2014-02-16	50	45.8 (1st)	48.9 (1st)	47.3 (1st)	47.9 (1st)
Average		32.6%	34.3%	33.0%	33.6%

Sources: TNmS Media Korea, AGB Nielsen Korea

== Awards and nominations ==
Year	Award	Category	Nominee	Result
2013	KBS Drama Awards	Top Excellence Award, Actress	Kim Hae-sook	Nominated
2013	KBS Drama Awards	Excellence Award, Actor in a Serial Drama	Jo Sung-ha	Won
2013	KBS Drama Awards	Excellence Award, Actor in a Serial Drama	Oh Man-seok	Nominated
2013	KBS Drama Awards	Excellence Award, Actress in a Serial Drama	Lee Tae-ran	Won
2013	KBS Drama Awards	Excellence Award, Actress in a Serial Drama	Lee Yoon-ji	Nominated
2013	KBS Drama Awards	Best Supporting Actress	Oh Hyun-kyung	Nominated
2013	KBS Drama Awards	Best New Actor	Han Joo-wan	Won
2013	KBS Drama Awards	Best Young Actor	Choi Won-hong	Nominated
2013	KBS Drama Awards	Best Young Actress	Moon Ga-young	Nominated
2013	KBS Drama Awards	Best Writer	Moon Young-nam	Won
2014	7th Korea Drama Awards	Best Drama	Wang's Family	Nominated

== International broadcast ==
It aired in Thailand on PPTV beginning May 9, 2014.

== Remake ==
- This series is remade in Vietnam as Gạo nếp gạo tẻ, currently aired on channel HTV2 (2018).
