= The Secret of My Love =

South Korean television series

- Promotional poster
- Also known as: The Secret of My Man
- Hangul: 내 남자의 비밀
- Hanja: 내 男子의 祕密
- Lit.: My Man's Secret
- RR: Nae namjaui bimil
- MR: Nae namjaŭi pimil
- Genre: Romantic drama
- Created by: KBS Drama Production (KBS 드라마 제작국)
- Written by: Kim Yeon-shil; Heo In-mu
- Directed by: Jin Hyung-wook
- Starring: Song Chang-eui; Kang Se-jung; Kim Da-hyun; Park Jung-ah
- Music by: Gaemi
- Country of origin: South Korea
- Original language: Korean
- No. of episodes: 100

Production
- Executive producers: Bae Ik-hyun; Kim Sang-hui; Lee Hyang-bong
- Producer: Lee Hyun-seok
- Cinematography: Kim Kyung-ho
- Editor: Kim Geun-soon
- Camera setup: Single camera
- Running time: 35 min
- Production company: Neo Entertainment

Original release
- Network: KBS2
- Release: September 18, 2017 – February 9, 2018

The Secret of My Love (Korean: 내 남자의 비밀) is a 2017 South Korean television series starring Song Chang-eui, Kang Se-jung, Kim Da-hyun, and Park Jung-ah. The series aired on KBS2 on Monday to Friday from 7:50 p.m. to 8:30 p.m. (KST).

== Plot ==
A man desperately wants to be "real," so he puts on a "real" mask. A woman wants to be loved so much that she throws out her younger sister and replaces her. The drama shows the struggles of these two, man and woman, who look for ways to find true happiness in their lives.

== Cast ==
=== Main ===
- Song Chang-eui as Han Ji-seob / Kang Jae-wook
- Kang Se-jung as Jin Yeo-rim / Ki Seo-ra
  - Kim Ji-ah as young Jin Yeo-rim / Ki Seo-ra
- Kim Da-hyun as Kang In-wook
- Park Jung-ah as Jin Hae-rim
  - Jeon Hye-in as young Jin Hae-rim

=== Supporting ===
==== People around Jae-wook ====
- Lee Hwi-hyang as Wi Seon-ae
- Yoon Joo-sang as Kang Joon-chae

==== People around Seo-ra ====
- Jung Han-yong as Ki Ra-sung
- Hwang Young-hee as Mo Jin-ja
- Kim Chae-un as Ki Cha-ra
- Yeon Mi-joo as Ki Dae-ra

==== People around Hae-rim ====
- Park Cheol-ho as Jin Guk-hyun
- Lee Deok-hee as Park Ji-sook
- Lim Doo-hwan as Do Ra-hee

== Original soundtrack ==
=== Part 1 ===
Released on October 19, 2017
No.	Title	Lyrics	Music	Artist	Length
1.	"The Shade Of Farewell" (이별의 그늘)	Park Joo-yeon	Yoon Sang	Han Soo-young	03:38
2.	"Shade Of Farewell" (Inst.)		Yoon Sang		03:38
Total length:					07:16

=== Part 2 ===
Released on December 12, 2017
No.	Title	Lyrics	Music	Artist	Length
1.	"Painful" (아프다)	Gaemi, Yoda	Gaemi, Kim Se-jin	Lee Bo-ram (SeeYa)	03:34
2.	"Painful" (Inst.)		Gaemi, Kim Se-jin		03:34
Total length:					07:08

== Ratings ==
- In this table, The blue numbers represent the lowest ratings and the red numbers represent the highest ratings.

Ep.	Original broadcast date	Average audience share			
Ep.	Original broadcast date	TNmS		AGB Nielsen	
Ep.	Original broadcast date	Nationwide	Seoul	Nationwide	Seoul
1	September 18, 2017	19.2% (2nd)	16.0% (2nd)	15.1% (3rd)	13.7% (3rd)
2	September 19, 2017	17.3% (2nd)	13.8% (2nd)	15.3% (2nd)	13.5% (2nd)
3	September 20, 2017	15.9% (2nd)	12.5% (3rd)	14.0% (3rd)	12.3% (3rd)
4	September 21, 2017	18.9% (2nd)	15.5% (2nd)	15.3% (2nd)	13.8% (2nd)
5	September 22, 2017	17.1% (2nd)	14.1% (2nd)	15.3% (2nd)	14.2% (2nd)
6	September 25, 2017	17.9% (2nd)	12.9% (2nd)	14.8% (3rd)	13.0% (3rd)
7	September 26, 2017	18.6% (2nd)	15.2% (2nd)	14.7% (3rd)	13.4% (2nd)
8	September 27, 2017	17.4% (2nd)	13.1% (3rd)	14.0% (3rd)	12.4% (3rd)
9	September 28, 2017	17.0% (2nd)	13.3% (3rd)	14.9% (3rd)	12.6% (3rd)
10	September 29, 2017	15.2% (2nd)	11.0% (4th)	14.7% (3rd)	13.0% (3rd)
11	October 2, 2017	14.8% (3rd)	11.1% (3rd)	12.8% (4th)	11.5% (4th)
12	October 3, 2017	15.8% (2nd)	11.9% (2nd)	11.5% (3rd)	10.3% (3rd)
13	October 4, 2017	14.3% (3rd)	10.3% (3rd)	11.1% (3rd)	10.1% (3rd)
14 (Note: Episode 14 did not air on October 5 due to KBS2 aired a Chuseok special movie Operation Chromite, on October 6 due to KBS2 aired a Chuseok original movie Ballet School's Swan Club, or on October 9 due to KBS2 aired a Chuseok special movie Luck-Key.)	October 10, 2017	18.9% (2nd)	14.6% (2nd)	15.2% (3rd)	12.3% (4th)
15	October 11, 2017	16.4% (2nd)	13.6% (3rd)	13.5% (4th)	11.7% (4th)
16	October 12, 2017	17.0% (2nd)	13.3% (2nd)	14.6% (3rd)	12.3% (4th)
17	October 16, 2017	17.3% (2nd)	13.6% (3rd)	14.0% (3rd)	11.6% (5th)
18	October 17, 2017 (Note: Episode 18 did not air on October 13 due to the broadcast of the 4th game of the KBO baseball playoff series between the Lotte Giants and the NC Dinos.)	16.6% (2nd)	12.4% (3rd)	14.0% (3rd)	11.4% (5th)
19	October 18, 2017	17.2% (2nd)	13.8% (2nd)	14.5% (2nd)	12.5% (3rd)
20	October 19, 2017	17.8% (2nd)	14.4% (2nd)	14.1% (3rd)	12.1% (4th)
21	October 23, 2017 (Note: Episode 21 did not air on October 20 due to the broadcast of the 3rd game of the KBO baseball playoff series between the Doosan Bears and the NC Dinos.)	18.2% (2nd)	13.9% (2nd)	15.0% (3rd)	12.8% (3rd)
22	October 24, 2017	18.6% (2nd)	14.9% (2nd)	15.8% (2nd)	13.7% (2nd)
23	October 25, 2017	16.4% (2nd)	13.4% (2nd)	13.5% (3rd)	11.4% (2nd)
24	October 27, 2017 (Note: Episode 24 did not air on October 26 due to the broadcast of the 2nd game of the KBO baseball playoff series between the Doosan Bears and the KIA Tigers.)	17.2% (2nd)	13.9% (2nd)	14.1% (3rd)	12.6% (3rd)
25	October 31, 2017 (Note: Episode 25 did not air on October 30 due to the broadcast of the 5th game of the KBO baseball playoff series between the Doosan Bears and the KIA Tigers.)	16.7% (2nd)	14.2% (2nd)	13.6% (3rd)	12.2% (3rd)
26	November 1, 2017	17.1% (2nd)	14.9% (2nd)	14.8% (3rd)	13.1% (3rd)
27	November 2, 2017	17.6% (2nd)	13.9% (2nd)	13.9% (3rd)	12.4% (3rd)
28	November 3, 2017	17.9% (2nd)	14.7% (2nd)	14.6% (3rd)	12.7% (4th)
29	November 6, 2017	18.2% (2nd)	14.3% (2nd)	14.7% (3rd)	13.1% (3rd)
30	November 7, 2017	18.1% (2nd)	15.4% (2nd)	14.5% (3rd)	13.1% (3rd)
31	November 8, 2017	17.0% (2nd)	14.5% (2nd)	14.6% (3rd)	12.5% (3rd)
32	November 9, 2017	17.8% (2nd)	14.8% (2nd)	14.9% (3rd)	12.7% (3rd)
33	November 10, 2017	18.5% (2nd)	14.4% (2nd)	15.2% (2nd)	13.1% (3rd)
34	November 13, 2017	16.2% (2nd)	13.9% (2nd)	15.0% (2nd)	13.5% (3rd)
35	November 14, 2017	17.5% (2nd)	13.9% (2nd)	14.8% (2nd)	12.3% (3rd)
36	November 15, 2017	15.7% (1st)	13.3% (1st)	14.1% (2nd)	11.9% (3rd)
37	November 16, 2017	15.9% (2nd)	13.9% (2nd)	13.6% (3rd)	11.9% (3rd)
38	November 17, 2017	16.9% (2nd)	14.6% (1st)	15.2% (2nd)	13.6% (3rd)
39	November 20, 2017	17.1% (2nd)	13.1% (2nd)	15.2% (2nd)	12.6% (3rd)
40	November 21, 2017	17.3% (2nd)	14.0% (2nd)	15.6% (3rd)	13.4% (3rd)
41	November 22, 2017	16.5% (2nd)	13.7% (2nd)	15.1% (2nd)	12.4% (4th)
42	November 23, 2017	18.1% (2nd)	13.6% (2nd)	15.6% (2nd)	13.4% (2nd)
43	November 24, 2017	17.7% (1st)	15.1% (1st)	15.2% (2nd)	13.6% (2nd)
44	November 27, 2017	16.6% (2nd)	14.1% (2nd)	14.1% (3rd)	12.1% (3rd)
45	November 28, 2017	17.1% (2nd)	13.9% (2nd)	14.8% (3rd)	12.9% (4th)
46	November 29, 2017	17.1% (2nd)	14.0% (2nd)	14.7% (3rd)	12.9% (3rd)
47	November 30, 2017	17.0% (2nd)	13.9% (2nd)	14.4% (2nd)	12.6% (3rd)
48	December 1, 2017	18.3% (1st)	15.6% (1st)	14.4% (2nd)	12.5% (4th)
49	December 4, 2017	18.8% (1st)	15.0% (1st)	14.6% (2nd)	13.0% (2nd)
50	December 5, 2017	18.1% (1st)	14.1% (1st)	15.0% (3rd)	13.2% (3rd)
51	December 6, 2017	17.1% (2nd)	15.8% (1st)	14.8% (2nd)	13.4% (2nd)
52	December 7, 2017	18.6% (2nd)	15.4% (2nd)	16.0% (2nd)	13.8% (2nd)
53	December 8, 2017	18.3% (1st)	14.4% (1st)	15.8% (2nd)	14.4% (3rd)
54	December 11, 2017	18.1% (2nd)	14.4% (2nd)	15.5% (2nd)	13.6% (3rd)
55	December 12, 2017	17.8% (1st)	13.8% (2nd)	16.0% (3rd)	14.5% (3rd)
56	December 13, 2017	18.5% (1st)	14.4% (2nd)	16.3% (2nd)	13.6% (1st)
57	December 14, 2017	19.0% (2nd)	15.3% (2nd)	16.6% (2nd)	14.8% (2nd)
58	December 15, 2017	17.8% (1st)	14.0% (2nd)	15.8% (2nd)	14.3% (3rd)
59	December 18, 2017	19.4% (1st)	15.2% (1st)	17.4% (2nd)	16.1% (2nd)
60	December 19, 2017	18.7% (1st)	14.7% (1st)	17.4% (2nd)	15.3% (2nd)
61	December 20, 2017	18.6% (1st)	15.3% (1st)	16.5% (2nd)	14.5% (3rd)
62	December 21, 2017	19.4% (1st)	15.1% (1st)	17.2% (1st)	15.1% (1st)
63	December 22, 2017	17.9% (1st)	13.6% (1st)	15.5% (3rd)	13.5% (4th)
64	December 25, 2017	18.2% (2nd)	14.1% (2nd)	16.6% (3rd)	14.8% (3rd)
65	December 26, 2017	21.5% (1st)	18.4% (1st)	19.5% (1st)	17.2% (1st)
66	December 27, 2017	20.9% (1st)	16.3% (1st)	17.7% (2nd)	16.0% (2nd)
67	December 28, 2017	20.9% (1st)	15.9% (1st)	17.8% (1st)	15.8% (2nd)
68	December 29, 2017	21.6% (1st)	17.2% (1st)	18.9% (1st)	16.5% (1st)
69	January 1, 2018	22.3% (1st)	18.2% (1st)	20.8% (1st)	19.6% (1st)
70	January 2, 2018	23.4% (1st)	19.3% (1st)	19.8% (1st)	17.9% (1st)
71	January 3, 2018	22.0% (1st)	17.2% (1st)	19.5% (1st)	17.8% (1st)
72	January 4, 2018	21.7% (1st)	17.6% (1st)	18.8% (1st)	16.8% (1st)
73	January 5, 2018	20.8% (1st)	16.7% (1st)	19.4% (1st)	17.5% (1st)
74	January 8, 2018	22.3% (1st)	18.4% (1st)	19.2% (1st)	17.1% (1st)
75	January 9, 2018	21.9% (1st)	17.8% (1st)	19.9% (1st)	17.6% (1st)
76	January 10, 2018	23.0% (1st)	18.9% (1st)	20.1% (1st)	17.3% (1st)
77	January 11, 2018	22.3% (1st)	18.2%	19.8% (1st)	16.9% (1st)
78	January 12, 2018	23.9% (1st)	19.8%	20.9% (1st)	18.9% (1st)
79	January 15, 2018	22.9% (1st)	18.7%	19.8% (1st)	17.0% (1st)
80	January 16, 2018	22.7% (1st)	18.6%	18.9% (2nd)	16.4% (2nd)
81	January 17, 2018	21.9% (1st)	17.8%	20.3% (1st)	18.3% (1st)
82	January 18, 2018	23.1% (1st)	19.0%	19.8% (1st)	17.6% (1st)
83	January 19, 2018	22.1% (1st)	18.0%	19.8% (1st)	18.1% (1st)
84	January 22, 2018	23.1% (1st)	18.9%	19.6% (2nd)	17.0% (2nd)
85	January 23, 2018	22.3% (1st)	18.2%	19.5% (2nd)	17.4% (2nd)
86	January 24, 2018	24.2% (1st)	20.3%	20.0% (1st)	17.1% (2nd)
87	January 25, 2018	22.3% (1st)	18.1%	19.8% (1st)	17.6% (1st)
88	January 26, 2018	24.6% (1st)	21.1%	20.2% (1st)	17.7% (1st)
89	January 29, 2018	24.1% (1st)	20.3%	19.4% (2nd)	16.6% (2nd)
90	January 30, 2018	24.3% (1st)	20.2%	21.4% (1st)	19.4% (1st)
91	January 31, 2018	25.8% (1st)	21.9%	20.8% (1st)	18.0% (2nd)
92	February 1, 2018	24.8% (1st)	21.3%	20.2% (1st)	17.7% (2nd)
93	February 2, 2018	24.6% (1st)	20.7%	20.4% (1st)	17.7% (1st)
94	February 5, 2018	26.4% (1st)	22.7%	21.8% (1st)	19.1% (1st)
95	February 6, 2018	25.2% (1st)	21.6%	20.6% (1st)	18.0% (1st)
96	February 7, 2018 (Note: Episodes 96 and 97 aired back-to-back on February 7.)	17.3% (1st)	13.1%	13.3% (6th)	13.2% (6th)
97	February 7, 2018	20.9% (1st)	17.4%	17.9% (1st)	16.5% (2nd)
98	February 8, 2018	14.1% (4th)	9.9%	11.7% (6th)	10.5% (5th)
99	February 9, 2018 (Note: Episodes 99 & 100 aired back-to-back on February 9.)	21.3% (1st)	17.2%	18.7% (2nd)	16.7% (2nd)
100	February 9, 2018	19.4% (3rd)	15.8%	17.2% (3rd)	15.6% (5th)
Average		19.2%	%	16.5%	14.5%

== Awards and nominations ==
Year	Award	Category	Nominee	Result	Ref.
2017	31st KBS Drama Awards	Excellence Award, Actor in a Daily Drama	Song Chang-eui	Won	
2017	31st KBS Drama Awards	Excellence Award, Actress in a Daily Drama	Lee Hwi-hyang	Nominated	
2018	6th APAN Star Awards	Excellence Award, Actor in a Serial Drama	Song Chang-eui	Nominated	
