= Jin Hyung-wook =

South Korean television producer and director

- Born: September 10, 1969 (age 56); South Korea
- Education: Seoul National University
- Occupations: Television producer, director
- Years active: 1999–present
- Employer(s): Director and Producer (KBS)

Korean name
- Hangul: 진형욱
- RR: Jin Hyeonguk
- MR: Chin Hyŏnguk

Jin Hyung-wook (Korean: 진형욱) is a South Korean television producer and director.

== Filmography ==
=== As TV producer ===
- This is Love (KBS2, 2001)
- Nine Tailed Fox (KBS2, 2004)
- Empress Cheonchu (KBS2, 2009)
- My Lawyer, Mr. (KBS2.2016)

=== As TV director ===
- When Spring Comes (KBS2, 2007)
- The Innocent Woman (KBS2, 2007)
- Three Brothers (KBS2, 2009–2010)
- My One and Only (KBS1, 2011–2012)
- Wang's Family (KBS2, 2013–2014)
- You Are the Only One (KBS1, 2014–2015)
- The Secret of My Love (KBS2, 2017)
- Liver or Die (KBS2, 2019)
- Born Again (KBS2, 2020)
- Red Balloon (TV Chosun, 2022)
