= Kim Da-hyun =

South Korean actor and singer (born 1980)

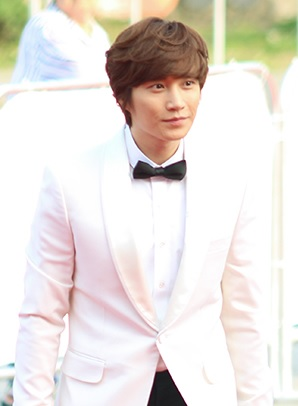
- Kim in 2013
- Born: January 1, 1980 (age 46); Seoul, South Korea
- Education: Dankook University – theater and film
- Occupations: Actor; singer
- Years active: 1999–present
- Agent: Imagine Asia
- Spouse: Kim Mi-kyung (m. 2008)
- Children: 3

Korean name
- Hangul: 김세현
- Hanja: 金世賢
- RR: Gim Sehyeon
- MR: Kim Sehyŏn

Stage name
- Hangul: 김다현
- Hanja: 金多炫
- RR: Gim Dahyeon
- MR: Kim Tahyŏn

Kim Se-hyun (Korean: 김세현; born January 1, 1980), better known as Kim Da-hyun, is a South Korean actor and singer. Kim made his entertainment debut in 1999 as the lead vocalist of the rock band Yada (which disbanded in 2004). Since then, he has been actively engaged in the musical theatre scene, playing lead roles in The Sorrows of Young Werther, Hedwig and the Angry Inch and La Cage aux Folles.

== Theater ==
Year	Title	Role
2003	The Sorrows of Young Werther	Werther
2003	Fame	
2004	Singin' in the Rain	
2004	Sonagi (Rain Shower)	Joon-beom
2005	Hedwig and the Angry Inch	Hedwig
2005	Love Diary	
2006	The Producers	Leo Bloom
2006	Fall in Love	Jae-young
2006	Han Jeong-rim's Music Diary	
2006	Hedwig and the Angry Inch	Hedwig
2007	Hedwig and the Angry Inch	Hedwig
2008	Radio Star	Choi Gon
2008	Han Jeong-rim's Music Diary	
2008	Hedwig and the Angry Inch	Hedwig
2009	Don Juan	Don Juan
2010	Voyage of Life	Davis
2011	Alone in Love	Ryuichiro
2012	Seopyeonje	Dong-ho
2012	Alone in Love	Ryuichiro
2012	M. Butterfly	Song Liling
2012	La Cage aux Folles	Albin
2012	Song of Two Flowers	Won-hyo
2012	The Sorrows of Young Werther	Werther
2012	Rock of Ages	Drew Boley
2013	Arsène Lupin	Arsène Lupin
2013	Han Jeong-rim's Music Diary	
2013	Moon Embracing the Sun	Lee Hwon
2013	Jack the Ripper	Daniel
2013	Guys and Dolls	Sky Masterson
2013	That Man's Story	
2014	Moon Embracing the Sun	Lee Hwon
2014	Guys and Dolls	Sky Masterson
2014	M. Butterfly	Song Liling
2014	Priscilla, Queen of the Desert	Bernadette
2014	Han Jeong-rim's Music Diary	
2014	Woyzeck	Franz Woyzeck
2014	Hedwig and the Angry Inch	Hedwig
2014	La Cage aux Folles	Albin
2022	Mrs. Doubtfire	Stewart

== Filmography ==
=== Television series ===
Year	Title	Role	Network
2005	Hello My Teacher	Ji Hyun-woo	SBS
2007	The King and I	Choi Ja-chi	SBS
2007	Lobbyist	Andy	SBS
2011	Warrior Baek Dong-soo	Gim Hongdo	SBS
2012	12 Signs of Love	Jo Hyun-woo	tvN
2012	The Great Seer	Sung-bok	SBS
2013	Pots of Gold	Jin Sang-chul	MBC
2013	KBS Drama Special – "Jin Jin"	Moon Tae-seok	KBS2
2014	Cunning Single Lady	Kim Chang-soo (guest, episodes 12–13)	MBC
2017	The Secret of My Love	Kang In-wook	KBS
2020	Rugal	Seol Min-joon	OCN
2021	Love Scene Number	George	MBC TV
2023	Moving	Bae Jaehak	Disney +

=== Film ===
Year	Title	Role
2010	Bloody Innocent	Seung-ho
2023	Shape of Tulip	Baek Seok-young

== Discography ==
Album information	Track listing
Wear to Healing Yada: Album; Artist: Yada; Released: March 1999; Label: Cream	Track listing: 1. Solo의 자부심; 2. T.T; 3. 이미 슬픈 사랑; 4. Zero; 5. 참아야 하느니라 욱하는 성질때문에; 6. 일탈; 7. 同床異夢 (동상이몽); 8. 바램; 9. 사랑이라는 것 또한; 10. We Say Yes; 11. 이미 슬픈 사랑 (MR)
Restructure: Album; Artist: Yada; Released: December 21, 2000; Label: Universal Music	Track listing: 1. 인연; 2. 진혼; 3. 사랑이 슬픔에게; 4. 기대; 5. Bel Canto; 6. In Your Dream; 7. Hyacinth; 8. 체념; 9. Love Again; 10. 사랑歌; 11. Chaos; 12. 진혼 (Editing Version)
Aquamarine: Album; Artist: Yada; Released: March 27, 2003; Label: Universal Music	Track listing: 1. 꿈이 아닐까; 2. 슬픈 다짐; 3. Only You; 4. 아니야; 5. Kastropolise; 6. 약속; 7. 내가 원한 사랑; 8. 미안해; 9. Believe; 10. Crazy Boy; 11. 너에게 하고픈 말 12. 망각

== Awards and nominations ==
Year	Award	Category	Nominated work	Result
2006	12th Korea Musical Awards	Best New Actor	Fall in Love	Won
