= Kim Suk-hoon =

South Korean actor (born 1972)

Kim Suk Hoon
- Born: April 15, 1972 (age 54); Yongsan District, Seoul, South Korea
- Years active: 1998–present
- Agent: Mystic Actors (Mystic Story)

Korean name
- Hangul: 김석훈
- Hanja: 金錫勳
- RR: Gim Seokhun
- MR: Kim Sŏkhun
- Website: kimsukhoon.co.kr

Kim Suk Hoon (Korean: 김석훈, born April 15, 1972) is a South Korean actor. He graduated from the Theater Department of Chung-ang University. He has played an active part of The National Drama Company of Korea as an actor. His performance is characteristically delicate with an attention to details. He also has profound knowledge in classical music.

== Filmography ==
- To My Beloved Thief (KBS2, 2026)
- My Mom (MBC, 2015-2016)
- The Jingbirok: A Memoir of Imjin War (2015)
- Ruby Ring (KBS2, 2013)
- Twinkle Twinkle (MBC, 2011)
- Empress Cheonchu (KBS2, 2009)
- A Happy Woman (KBS2, 2007)
- Fireworks (MBC, 2006, cameo)
- The Secret Lovers (MBC, 2005)
- Han River Ballad (MBC, 2004)
- Into the Storm (SBS, 2004)
- Affection (SBS, 2002)
- Man and Woman: Scissorhands (SBS, 2001)
- SWAT Police (SBS, 2000)
- Love Story - Owner's Memory (SBS, 2000)
- Tomato (SBS, 1999)
- Trap of Youth (SBS, 1999)
- Letters Written on a Cloudy Day (SBS, 1998-1999)
- Hong Gil-dong (SBS, 1998)

=== Film ===
- The World of Love (2025)
- Innocence (2020)
- Circle of Crime (2012)
- The Accidental Gangster and the Mistaken Courtesan (2008)
- Makang Hotel (2007)
- So Cute (2004)
- Tube (2003)
- Tomak: Save the Earth, a Love Story (2001)
- The Gingko Bed 2 (2000)
- The Chinese Restaurant Peking (1999)

=== TV shows ===
- Show Host : SBS, Your Curious Story (2010-present)
- A DJ : CBS, To Beautiful You (2011–2015)

=== Theater ===
- Flowed Swing (1998)
- Twelfth Night by Shakespeare (1998)
- The Turtle Ships (1998)
- The True Story of Ah Q (1999)
- Trip to Mui Island (1999)
- An Intruder of Kobe (1999)
- Hamlet (2001)
- Art (2006)
- The Mischief of Love and Coincidence - Le jeu de l'amour et du hasard (2007)
- Long Day's Journey Into Night (2009)

=== Music video appearances ===
- Kim Bum-soo - "A Promise" (1999)
- Jo Sung-mo - "A Thorn Tree" (2000)
- Lee Soo-young - "And I Love You" (2001)
- F&F - "Struggle" (2006)
- KCM - "Three Years Later" (2010)

=== Other activities ===
- Ballet : The Pirate (1998)
- Musical : The King and I (2003)
- Narration : Romantic Comics (2005)
- Narration : Super Fish Documentary (2012)

== Awards ==
- 1998 SBS Drama Awards: Best New Actor (Letters Written on a Cloudy Day)
- 1999 SBS Drama Awards: Excellence Award, Actor; Top 10 Stars (Tomato)
- 2004 MBC Drama Awards: Excellence Award, Actor (Han River Ballad)
- 2009 KBS Drama Awards: Excellence Award, Actor in a Serial Drama (Empress Cheonchu)
- 2011 MBC Drama Awards: Top Excellence Award, Actor in a Serial Drama (Twinkle Twinkle)
- 2013 KBS Drama Awards: Excellence Award, Actor in a Daily Drama (Ruby Ring)
- 2015 Korea PD Awards: Radio Classic DJ Award (CBS, To Beautiful You)
- 2016 Korea Broadcasting Awards: Show Host Narrator Award (SBS, Your Curious Story)
- 2017 SBS Entertainment Awards: Best MC Award for Documentary Program (SBS, Your Curious Story)

== Careers ==
- 2005 : The Honorary Spokesperson of Cheongju International Craft Biennale
- 2009 : The Honorary Spokesperson of Beautiful Store
- 2010 : The Honorary Spokesperson of The Jansen Exhibition in Korea
- 2011 : The Honorary Spokesperson of Seoul International Book Fair
- 2011 : The Honorary Spokesperson of The 92nd National Sports Festival in Goyang City
