= Kyung Soo-jin =

South Korean actress (born 1987)

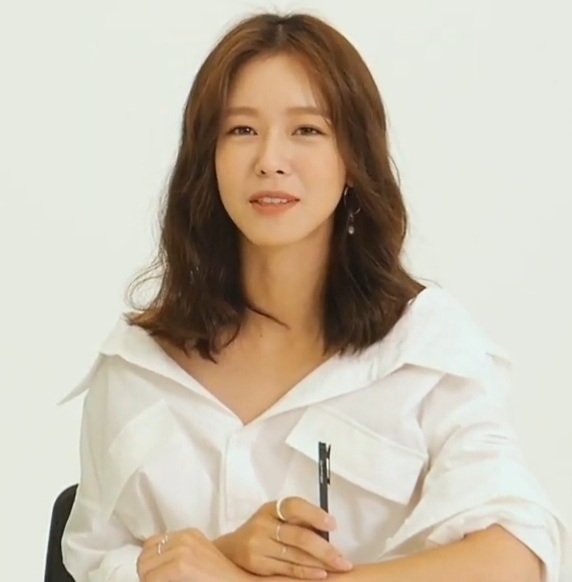
- Kyung in August 2020
- Born: December 5, 1987 (age 38); Siheung, Gyeonggi-do, South Korea
- Occupation: Actress
- Years active: 2012–present
- Agent: Uhoo Studio

Korean name
- Hangul: 경수진
- RR: Gyeong Sujin
- MR: Kyŏng Sujin

Kyung Soo-jin (Korean: 경수진; born December 5, 1987) is a South Korean actress.

== Career ==
After supporting roles in Man from the Equator, That Winter, the Wind Blows and Shark, she played her first leading role in Eunhui. She then played the second female lead in sports drama Weightlifting Fairy Kim Bok-joo, and starred in the romantic fantasy drama Meloholic.

In November 2018, Kyung signed with YG Entertainment. On December 16, 2021, it was reported that Kyung had decided to renew her contract with the agency.

In August 2025, she became a free agent after her former agency, YG Entertainment, announced the closure of its actor management division in January. Following a period of careful consideration, Kyung recently decided to join Uhoo Studio.

== Filmography ==
=== Film ===
Year	Title	Role	Notes	Ref.
2013	How to Use Guys with Secret Tips	Kim Mi-ra		
2013	Holly	Cathy		
2014	Mourning Grave	woman who acts different	cameo appearance	
2016	Horror Stories 3	Kyung Soo-jin	segment "Road Rage"	
2017	The King's Case Note	Sun-hwa		
2018	The Vanished	Ji-young	Special appearance	
2025	The Noisy Mansion	Ahn Geo-ul		
2025	Holy Night: Demon Hunters	Jung-won		

=== Television series ===
Year	Title	Role	Notes	Ref.
2012	Man from the Equator	Han Ji-won (young)		
2012	KBS Drama Special: "Still Picture"	Seo Eun-soo (young)	one act-drama	
2012	KBS Drama Special : "Ugly Cake"	Oh Ah-young	one act-drama	
2012–2013	The King's Doctor	Crown Princess Minhoe	(cameo)	
2013	That Winter, the Wind Blows	Moon Hee-joo		
2013	Don't Look Back: The Legend of Orpheus	Jo Hae-woo (young)		
2013–2014	KBS TV Novel: "Eunhui"	Kim Eun-hee		
2014	Secret Affair	Park Da-mi		
2014	Plus Nine Boys	Ma Se-young		
2015	House of Bluebird	Kang Young-joo		
2015	KBS Drama Special: "My Fantastic Funeral"	Jang Mi-soo	one act-drama	
2016	Entourage	Seung-hyo	Cameo (episode 10)	
2016–2017	Weightlifting Fairy Kim Bok-joo	Song Shi-ho		
2017	Meloholic	Han Ye-ri / Han Joo-ri		
2017–2018	Untouchable	Yoon Jung-hye	Cameo	
2019	Drama Stage: "Like a Dog, Like a Beggar, Beautiful"	Yoo-rim	one act-drama	
2019	Joseon Survival Period	Lee Hye-jin		
2020	Train	Han Seo-kyung		
2020	Hush	Oh Soo-yeon	Cameo (episode 1–2)	
2021	Mouse	Choi Hong-joo		

=== Web series ===
Year	Title	Role	Notes	Ref.
2022–2023	Shadow Detective	Lee Seong-ah	Season 1–2	

=== Music video appearances ===
Years	Title	Artist	Ref.
2011	"Like a Man"	Eye to Eye	
2011	"Right Now"	Soul Star	
2011	"Flowing Tears"	Jungyup	
2013	"Far Away"	Hong Dae-kwang	
2013	"You"	Brown Eyed Soul	
2017	"Be Well"	Sechs Kies	
2019	"No Love, No Heartbreak"	Baek Ji-young	
2021	"Nothing Special with the Day"	Im Chang-jung	

== Awards and nominations ==
Name of the award ceremony, year presented, category, nominee of the award, and the result of the nomination
Award ceremony	Year	Category	Nominee / Work	Result	Ref.
APAN Star Awards	2014	Best New Actress	Plus Nine Boys	Nominated	
Asia Content Awards & Global OTT Awards	2023	Best Supporting Actress	Shadow Detective	Nominated	
Baeksang Arts Awards	2014	Best New Actress – Television	Eunhui	Nominated	
Blue Dragon Series Awards	2023	Best Supporting Actress	Shadow Detective	Nominated	
KBS Drama Awards	2013	Best New Actress	Eunhui & Don't Look Back: The Legend of Orpheus	Won	
KBS Drama Awards	2015	Excellence Award, Actress in a Serial Drama	House of Bluebird	Nominated	
Korea Culture and Entertainment Awards	2014	Best New Actress (Television)	Plus Nine Boys	Won	
Korea Drama Awards	2013	Best New Actress	Eunhui & Don't Look Back: The Legend of Orpheus	Nominated	
MBC Drama Awards	2016	Excellence Award, Actress in a Miniseries	Weightlifting Fairy Kim Bok-joo	Nominated	
MBC Entertainment Awards	2020	Excellence Award in Variety Category (Female)	I Live Alone	Nominated	
