= Moon Young-nam =

South Korean television screenwriter (born 1960)

- Born: March 13, 1960 (age 66); Hwacheon, Gangwon, South Korea
- Education: Seoul Women's University
- Occupation: Screenwriter
- Years active: 1992–present

Korean name
- Hangul: 문영남
- RR: Mun Yeongnam
- MR: Mun Yŏngnam

Moon Young-nam (born March 13, 1960) is a South Korean television screenwriter. Moon began writing dramas in the early 1990s, but it was Terms of Endearment (2004) and My Rosy Life (2005) that brought her praise for taking clichéd and predictable tearjerker plots (Korean: 신파; RR: sinpa) and making them into powerful melodramas with a fresh spin, filled with ironically named characters. In her dramas, Moon often delves into the harsh realities of married life with candidness and wit, and her style has been consistently popular with local audiences, resulting in high viewership ratings for Famous Princesses (2006), First Wives' Club (2007), Three Brothers (2009) and Wang's Family (2013).

== Filmography ==
- Kingdom of Anger (MBC, 1992)
- Police (KBS2, 1994)
- Even If the Wind Blows (KBS1, 1995-1996)
- Because I Really (KBS1, 1996-1997)
- You Don't Know My Mind (MBC, 1999-2000)
- Rules of Marriage (MBC, 2001)
- That Woman Catches People (SBS, 2002)
- Terms of Endearment (KBS2, 2004)
- My Rosy Life (KBS2, 2005)
- Famous Princesses (KBS2, 2006)
- First Wives' Club (SBS, 2007-2008)
- Three Brothers (KBS2, 2009-2010)
- Living in Style (SBS, 2011-2012)
- Wang's Family (KBS2, 2013-2014)
- Our Gap-soon (SBS, 2016-2017)
- Liver or Die (KBS2, 2019)
- Revolutionary Sisters (KBS2, 2021)
- Red Balloon (TV Chosun, 2022)
- I Can't Live Without You ( TV Chosun, TBA)

== Awards ==
- 1992 1st MBC Literature Awards: Recipient (Kingdom of Anger)
- 1996 32nd Baeksang Arts Awards: Best TV Screenplay (Even If the Wind Blows)
- 1996 23rd Korea Broadcasting Awards: Best TV Writer
- 1996 8th Korean Broadcast Producers Awards: Special Award, Writer category
- 1997 KBS Drama Awards: Best Writer (Because I Really)
- 2004 KBS Drama Awards: Best Writer (Terms of Endearment)
- 2006 KBS Drama Awards: Special Award (Famous Princesses)
- 2008 SBS Drama Awards: Achievement Award (First Wives' Club)
- 2013 KBS Drama Awards: Best Writer (Wang's Family)
