= Eunhui =

2013 South Korean television series

- Promotional poster
- Also known as: Eun-hee
- Hangul: 은희
- RR: Eunhui
- MR: Ŭnhŭi
- Genre: Family drama, Romance, Melodrama, Period drama
- Written by: Lee Sang-min; Ahn Hong-ran
- Directed by: Han Chul-kyung
- Starring: Kyung Soo-jin; Lee In; Choi Yoon-so; Jung Mi-jin
- Country of origin: South Korea
- Original language: Korean
- No. of episodes: 140

Production
- Executive producer: Kim Sung-geun
- Production location: Korea
- Running time: Mondays to Fridays at 09:00 (KST)

Original release
- Network: Korean Broadcasting System
- Release: June 24, 2013 – January 3, 2014

Eunhui (Korean: 은희), or Eun-hee, is a 2013 South Korean morning soap opera starring Kyung Soo-jin, Lee In, Choi Yoon-so and Jung Mi-jin. It aired on KBS2 from June 24, 2013, to January 3, 2014, on Mondays to Fridays at 9:00 a.m. for 140 episodes.

== Plot ==
A day before the Korean War breaks out in 1950, a man is murdered. This event triggers repercussions in three families, as four young people struggle with love and forgiveness.

Kim Eun-hee's father was falsely accused of the murder, and dies tragically as a result. Since then, Eun-hee has been shunned by her fellow villagers.

Im Sung-jae has always been in love with Eun-hee, but the past threatens to tear them apart. Since his father's death, Sung-jae was ironically rescued and raised as a son by the real killer, Cha Seok-goo.

Seok-goo's daughter, Cha Young-joo, is arrogant and smart, and has feelings for Sung-jae. Her jealousy drives her to try to break up his relationship with Eun-hee.

Choi Jung-tae is also in love with Eun-hee, but he accepts that she cares for someone else.

== Cast ==
=== Main characters ===
- Kyung Soo-jin as Kim Eun-hee
- Lee In as Im Sung-jae
  - Jung Yoo-geun as young Sung-jae
- Choi Yoon-so as Cha Young-joo
- Jung Min-jin as Choi Jung-tae

=== Supporting characters ===
- Lee Dae-yeon as Kim Hyung-man
- Kim Hye-sun as Han Jung-ok
- Hong Il-kwon as Im Deok-soo
- Ban Hyo-jung as Lee Geum-soon
- Choi Joon-yong as Lee Baek-soo
- Jung So-hee as Shin Haeng-ja
- Park Chan-hwan as Cha Seok-goo
- Hwang Mi-seon as Kang Gil-rye
- Choi Joo-bong as Captain Go
- Chae Min-hee as Go Soon-deok
- Son Jong-bum as Hong Sam-bong
- Kim Bo-mi as Kim Hyung-sook / Lola Kim
- Lee Ha-yool as Choi Myung-ho
- Jo Byung-ki as Kang Jae-pil
- Kang Kyung-hun as Madam Jung
- Kim Min-kyung as Mi-kyung
- Ban Sang-yoon as Nub-chi
- Lee In-chul as President Shin
- Im Ji-young as Miss Park
- Kim Tae-rin as Jung-sook
- Yoo Jae-hyun as Yang Ah-chi
- Seo Hye-jin as Miss Go
- Choi Ro-woon as Seung-mo

== Awards and nominations ==
Year	Award	Category	Recipient	Result
2013	6th Korea Drama Awards	Best New Actress	Kyung Soo-jin	Nominated
2013	KBS Drama Awards	Best New Actress	Kyung Soo-jin	Won
2013	KBS Drama Awards	Excellence Award, Actor in a Daily Drama	Park Chan-hwan	Nominated
2013	KBS Drama Awards	Excellence Award, Actress in a Daily Drama	Kim Hye-sun	Nominated
2014	50th Baeksang Arts Awards	Best New Actress (TV)	Kyung Soo-jin	Nominated
