= Meloholic =

2017 South Korean television series

- Promotional poster
- Hangul: 멜로홀릭
- RR: Mellohollik
- MR: Mellohollik
- Genre: Romance comedy Fantasy; Mystery
- Created by: OCN oksusu
- Based on: Meloholic by Team Getname
- Written by: Park So-yeong
- Directed by: Song Hyun-wook
- Starring: Jung Yun-ho; Kyung Soo-jin
- Country of origin: South Korean
- Original language: Korean
- No. of episodes: 10

Production
- Executive producers: Lee Jae-gil; Moon Bo-hyun; Park Seong-hye
- Producer: Kim Dong-hee
- Camera setup: Single camera
- Production company: KBS Media

Original release
- Network: OCN
- Release: November 6 – December 5, 2017

Meloholic (Korean: 멜로홀릭) is a 2017 South Korean television series starring Jung Yun-ho and Kyung Soo-jin. It is based on the webtoon of the same name by Team Getname. The series aired on OCN starting November 6, 2017 on Mondays and Tuesdays at 21:00 (KST). It also aired on mobile app Oksusu on November 1, 2017.

The drama won Best Writer award at the 12th International Busan Contents Market.

== Synopsis ==
The series is about a man with the power to read women's thoughts when he touches them. His superpower makes it difficult for him to date. He comes across a woman who actually says what she thinks, but she turns out to have split personalities.

== Cast ==
=== Main ===
- Jung Yun-ho as Yoo Eun-ho

A heartthrob who has the special power to read women's minds.

- Kyung Soo-jin as Han Ye-ri / Han Joo-ri

A woman with two split personalities.

=== Supporting ===
- Han Joo-wan as Kim Sun-ho
- Choi Dae-chul as Kim Joo-seung
- Ahn Sol-bin as Kim Min-jung
- Han Jae-suk as Yoo Shik
- Kim Min-kyu as Yoo Byung-chul
- Go Min-si as Joo Yeon-jin
- Song Yoo-ji as Je-yi

=== Special appearance ===
- Gong Seung-yeon as a reckless nurse
- Jeon Se-hyun as Professor Park
- Clara Lee as Yun Kyung-ae
- Yoon So-hee
- Kim Ki-doo as a pervert (Ep.4)
- Jun

== Production ==
The series is directed by Song Hyun-wook of Marriage, Not Dating, Another Miss Oh and Introverted Boss.

== Original soundtrack ==
=== Part 1 ===
No.	Title	Lyrics	Music	Artist	Length
1.	"The Temperature at That Time" (그때의 온도)	ZigZag Note, Jump	ZigZag Note	Martin Smith	04:29
2.	"The Temperature at That Time" (Inst.)		Zigzag Note		04:29
Total length:					08:58

=== Part 2 ===
No.	Title	Lyrics	Music	Artist	Length
1.	"Say I Love You" (괜찮나요)	Yoda	Midnight, Kim Se-jin	Park Ji-min (15&)	04:09
2.	"Say I Love You" (Inst.)		Midnight, Kim Se-jin		04:09
Total length:					08:18

=== Part 3 ===
No.	Title	Lyrics	Music	Artist	Length
1.	"Falling You"	Heo Sung-jin	Heo Sung-jin, Hong Sung-jun	Taeil (Block B), Kim So-hee	03:15
2.	"Falling You" (Inst.)		Heo Sung-jin, Hong Sung-jun		03:15
Total length:					06:30

=== Part 4 ===
No.	Title	Lyrics	Music	Artist	Length
1.	"Meloholic" (멜로홀릭)	Um Gi-yeob, Lee Young-jo	Park Woo-sung	Yeonjung (Cosmic Girls)	02:48
2.	"Meloholic" (Inst.)		Park Woo-sung		02:48
Total length:					05:36

=== Part 5 ===
No.	Title	Lyrics	Music	Artist	Length
1.	"By Your Side" (맴돌아)	EZ Kim (GGOTJAM Project)	Manager, Lovelyee	EZ Kim (GGOTJAM Project)	04:34
2.	"By Your Side" (Inst.)		Manager, Lovelyee		04:34
Total length:					09:08
