= Choi Won-hong =

South Korean actor

- Born: December 14, 2000 (age 25); Suwon, Gyeonggi Province, South Korea
- Occupation: Actor
- Years active: 2006–2019
- Agent: Big Whale Entertainment

Korean name
- Hangul: 최원홍
- Hanja: 崔元洪
- RR: Choe Wonhong
- MR: Ch'oe Wŏnhong

Choi Won-hong (born December 14, 2000) is a South Korean actor. After being discharged from the military in 2022, he signed a contract with Jung Man-sik's agency, Big Whale Entertainment.

== Filmography ==
=== Television series ===
Year	Title	Role	Notes/Ref.
2005	Can We Refill the Love?		
2006	Great Inheritance		
2006	Love and Hate	Im Min-ho	
2007	Kimchi Cheese Smile	Dong-goo	
2007	Lee San, Wind of the Palace	Prince Wanpoong	
2007	That Woman is Scary	Ji Woong	
2007	Cruel Love	Bo-ram	
2008	East of Eden	young Shin Tae-hwan	
2008	The Kingdom of the Winds	young Moo-hyul	
2009	Korean Ghost Stories	Yong(-yi)	episode: "The Wooden Doll"
2009	The Queen Returns	Na Seon-woong	
2010	Becoming a Billionaire	Bu Tae-kyung	
2010	The Great Merchant		
2010	Running, Gu	young Heo Ji-man	
2010	Playful Kiss	Baek Eun-jo	
2011	My Princess	young Park Hae-young	
2011	My Bittersweet Life	Hong Jin	
2011	Gyebaek	young King Uija	
2011	Insu, the Queen Mother	Prince Jasan	
2012	Rooftop Prince	young Lee Gak	
2012	Faith	Prince Kyungchang	guest, episodes 6-7
2013	Wang's Family	Wang Dae-bak	
2014	12 Years Promise	young Yoo Joon-sung	
2014	Secret Door	Uhm Jae-sun	
2015	The Village: Achiara's Secret	Ba-woo	
2016	Pied Piper	Seo Joon	
2016	Woman with a Suitcase	Oh Kyung-hwan	
2017	Tunnel	Yoon Dong-woo	
2017	Black	Oh Sang-min	
2017	Two Cops	High school student	
2018	Partners for Justice	Park Jun-ha	
2018	Big Forest	Kim Dan	
2018	My Strange Hero	Kang In-ho	

=== Film ===
Year	Title	Role	Notes
2006	Off-course	Yeon-wook	short film
2007	Deorbited: A Scale in Zero Gravity	young Gong Gwi-man	short film
2007	Ko Pil-deok	Ko Pil-mu, Pil-deok's younger brother	short film
2007	A Monster in the Swamp	young Min-gyu	short film
2007	Greco-Roman Love	Boy	short film
2008	My Wife Got Married	Joon-seo	

=== Variety show ===
Year	Title
2013	Olala School
2014	Olala School 2
2016	Uncle's Ranch

== Awards and nominations ==
Year	Award	Category	Nominated work	Result
2013	KBS Drama Awards	Best Young Actor	Wang's Family	Nominated
