= 2013 KBS Drama Awards =

27th edition of award ceremony

- Date: December 31, 2013
- Hosted by: Lee Mi-sook; Shin Hyun-joon; Joo Sang-wook; Im Yoona

Television coverage
- Network: KBS

The 2013 KBS Drama Awards is a ceremony honoring the outstanding achievement in television on the Korean Broadcasting System (KBS) network for the year of 2013. It was held on December 31, 2013, and hosted by actors Lee Mi-sook, Shin Hyun-joon, Joo Sang-wook, and Im Yoona.

== Nominations and winners ==
(Winners denoted in bold)

Grand Prize (Daesang)
**Kim Hye-soo** – **The Queen of Office**
Top Excellence Award, Actor	Top Excellence Award, Actress
**Ji Sung** – **Secret Love**; **Joo Won** – **Good Doctor**; Jang Hyuk – Iris II: New Generation; Kim Nam-gil – Don't Look Back: The Legend of Orpheus; Oh Ji-ho – The Queen of Office; Uhm Tae-woong – The Blade and Petal	**Hwang Jung-eum** – **Secret Love**; Kim Hae-sook – Wang's Family; Kim Hye-soo – The Queen of Office; Lee Mi-sook – You Are the Best!; Moon Chae-won – Good Doctor; Son Ye-jin – Don't Look Back: The Legend of Orpheus
Excellence Award, Actor in a Miniseries	Excellence Award, Actress in a Miniseries
**Oh Ji-ho** – **The Queen of Office**; Jang Keun-suk – Bel Ami; Ji Sung – Secret Love; Lee Beom-soo – Prime Minister and I; Lee Dong-gun – Marry Him If You Dare	**Im Yoon-ah** – **Prime Minister and I**; Hwang Jung-eum – Secret Love; Jung Yu-mi – The Queen of Office; Kim Hye-soo – The Queen of Office; Yoon Eun-hye – Marry Him If You Dare
Excellence Award, Actor in a Mid-length Drama	Excellence Award, Actress in a Mid-length Drama
**Joo Sang-wook** – **Good Doctor**; Jang Hyuk – Iris II: New Generation; Joo Won – Good Doctor; Kim Nam-gil – Don't Look Back: The Legend of Orpheus; Lee Dong-wook – The Fugitive of Joseon; Uhm Tae-woong – The Blade and Petal	**Moon Chae-won** – **Good Doctor**; Kim Ok-vin – The Blade and Petal; Lee Da-hae – Iris II: New Generation; Son Ye-jin – Don't Look Back: The Legend of Orpheus; Song Ji-hyo – The Fugitive of Joseon
Excellence Award, Actor in a Serial Drama	Excellence Award, Actress in a Serial Drama
**Jo Jung-suk** – **You Are the Best!**; **Jo Sung-ha** – **Wang's Family**; Choi Soo-jong – Dream of the Emperor; Oh Man-seok – Wang's Family; Kim Chan-woo – Hometown Over the Hill 2	**Lee Mi-sook** – **You Are the Best!**; **Lee Tae-ran** – **Wang's Family**; Hong Eun-hee – Dream of the Emperor; IU – You Are the Best!; Lee Yoon-ji – Wang's Family
Excellence Award, Actor in a Daily Drama	Excellence Award, Actress in a Daily Drama
**Kim Suk-hoon** – **Ruby Ring**; Lee Jung-gil – Melody of Love; Park Chan-hwan – Eunhui; Park Gwang-hyun – Ruby Ring; Yoo Tae-woong – Samsaengi	**Lee So-yeon** – **Ruby Ring**; Hong Ah-reum – Samsaengi; Im Jung-eun – Ruby Ring; Kim Hye-sun – Eunhui, Melody of Love; Park Se-young – A Tale of Two Sisters
Excellence Award, Actor in a One-Act/Special/Short Drama	Excellence Award, Actress in a One-Act/Special/Short Drama
**Choi Daniel** – **Drama Special "Waiting for Love"**; **Yu Oh-seong** – **Drama Special "The Devil Rider" / "Mother's Island"**; Han Joo-wan – Drama Special "Yeon-woo's Summer"; Jung Woong-in – Drama Special "Happy! Rose Day"; Ryu Soo-young – Drama Special "The Memory in My Old Wallet"; Seo Jun-young – Drama Special "Sirius"	**BoA** – **Drama Special "Waiting for Love"**; **Han Ye-ri** – **Drama Special "Yeon-woo's Summer"**; Lee Chae-young – Drama Special "The Devil Rider"; Ryu Hyun-kyung – Drama Special "Outlasting Happiness"; Song Seon-mi – Drama Special "Their Perfect Day"; Ye Ji-won – Drama Special "Chagall's Birthday"
Best Supporting Actor	Best Supporting Actress
**Bae Soo-bin** – **Secret Love**; Choi Min-soo – The Blade and Petal; Jo Hee-bong – Good Doctor; Ko Chang-seok – Good Doctor, Ad Genius Lee Tae-baek; Lee Hee-joon – The Queen of Office	**Lee Da-hee** – **Secret Love**; Jin Kyung – Good Doctor; Kim Min-seo – Good Doctor; Oh Hyun-kyung – Wang's Family; Yoo In-na – You Are the Best!
Best New Actor	Best New Actress
**Han Joo-wan** – **Wang's Family**, **Drama Special "Yeon-woo's Summer"**; **Jung Woo** – **You Are the Best!**; Baek Sung-hyun – Iris II: New Generation, Melody of Love; Im Seulong – The Fugitive of Joseon; Kim Young-kwang – Good Doctor	**IU** – **You Are the Best!**, **Bel Ami**; **Kyung Soo-jin** – **Eunhui**, **Don't Look Back: The Legend of Orpheus**; Kim Dasom – Melody of Love; Nam Bo-ra – Don't Look Back: The Legend of Orpheus, Drama Special "The Memory in My Old Wallet"; Park Se-young – A Tale of Two Sisters
Best Young Actor	Best Young Actress
**Yeon Joon-seok** – **Don't Look Back: The Legend of Orpheus**; Choi Ro-woon – Good Doctor, Eunhui; Choi Won-hong – Wang's Family; Jung Yoon-seok – Good Doctor; Kim Ji-hoon – Melody of Love, Samsaengi	**Kim Yoo-bin** – **The Fugitive of Joseon**; Hyun Seung-min – The Blade and Petal, Samsaengi; Kim Hyun-soo – Good Doctor, Dream of the Emperor; Kim Hwan-hee – You Are the Best!; Moon Ka-young – Wang's Family
Netizen Award, Actor	Netizen Award, Actress
**Joo Won** – **Good Doctor**	**Hwang Jung-eum** – **Secret Love**
Popularity Award, Actor	Popularity Award, Actress
**Ji Sung** – **Secret Love**	**Moon Chae-won** – **Good Doctor**
Best Couple Award	Best Writer
**Ji Sung** and **Hwang Jung-eum** – **Secret Love**; **Jo Jung-suk** and **IU** – **You Are the Best!**; **Joo Won** and **Moon Chae-won** – **Good Doctor**; **Lee Beom-soo** and **Im Yoon-ah** – **Prime Minister and I**; **Oh Ji-ho** and **Kim Hye-soo** – **The Queen of Office**
**Ji Sung** and **Hwang Jung-eum** – **Secret Love**; **Jo Jung-suk** and **IU** – **You Are the Best!**; **Joo Won** and **Moon Chae-won** – **Good Doctor**; **Lee Beom-soo** and **Im Yoon-ah** – **Prime Minister and I**; **Oh Ji-ho** and **Kim Hye-soo** – **The Queen of Office**	**Moon Young-nam** – **Wang's Family**
**Ji Sung** and **Hwang Jung-eum** – **Secret Love**; **Jo Jung-suk** and **IU** – **You Are the Best!**; **Joo Won** and **Moon Chae-won** – **Good Doctor**; **Lee Beom-soo** and **Im Yoon-ah** – **Prime Minister and I**; **Oh Ji-ho** and **Kim Hye-soo** – **The Queen of Office**	PD Award
**Ji Sung** and **Hwang Jung-eum** – **Secret Love**; **Jo Jung-suk** and **IU** – **You Are the Best!**; **Joo Won** and **Moon Chae-won** – **Good Doctor**; **Lee Beom-soo** and **Im Yoon-ah** – **Prime Minister and I**; **Oh Ji-ho** and **Kim Hye-soo** – **The Queen of Office**	**Joo Won** – **Good Doctor**
