= Han Seo-hee =

North Korean singer (born 1982)

- Born: 1982; Pyongyang, North Korea
- Education: Pyongyang University of Music and Dance
- Occupations: Singer; vocalist; instrumentalist
- Years active: 1990–present

Korean name
- Hangul: 한서희
- RR: Han Seohui
- MR: Han Sŏhŭi

Han Seo-hee (Korean: 한서희; born 1982) is a North Korean defector, musician, and television personality based in South Korea. She is best known for her former role in an elite North Korean music troupe and her frequent appearances on South Korean variety programs, where she discusses her experiences within the Kim regime and her transition to South Korean society.

== Early life and career in North Korea ==
Han was born into a family of relative luxury in North Korea. Her father was a businessman and her mother was an accountant. At the age of eight, she was selected for elite training based on her physical appearance and vocal talent. She eventually graduated from the Pyongyang University of Music and Dance.

During the early 2000s, Han served in the national orchestra and a secret music troupe that performed exclusively for Kim Jong-il and his inner circle. She was a trained vocalist and a player of the oungum, a traditional lute allegedly invented by Kim Jong-il. Han was also a member of the "Army of Beauties," North Korea's elite cheerleading squad. She has since described the squad as a tool for ideological propaganda, noting that members underwent intensive psychological training to remain loyal to the regime while abroad.

== Defection ==
Han's family fled North Korea in October 2006. The defection was precipitated by her brother, who had already fled to South Korea to be with a woman from a "politically disreputable" family. To avoid the collective punishment typically imposed on the families of defectors, Han and her parents escaped through China and Mongolia, eventually arriving in South Korea in March 2007.

== Career in South Korea ==
Han became a prominent media figure in South Korea, notably appearing as a regular on the following programs, Now on My Way to Meet You (Moranbong Club) a hybrid talk and talent show featuring North Korean defectors. She appeared in The Moranbong Club a variety show where she demonstrated her musical skills and shared anecdotes about North Korean culture.

In addition to her television work, Han has been an advocate for defector integration and human rights.

During the COVID-19 pandemic, she launched a YouTube channel to connect with audiences. In July 2024, she published a book of essays titled Everyday Life in South Korea, which details her escape and the challenges of adjusting to a new culture.

== Personal life ==
Han is often confused with a South Korean K-pop trainee of the same name. She has stated that her goal is to pursue graduate studies to further her work in North Korean human rights and eventual Korean unification.

== Activism ==
Han has used her platform to challenge South Korean prejudices against defectors. She has voiced optimism regarding the potential for North Korean regime change, citing the increasing frequency of high-level defections as a sign of internal instability.
