= Han Hye-rin =

South Korean actress (born 1988)

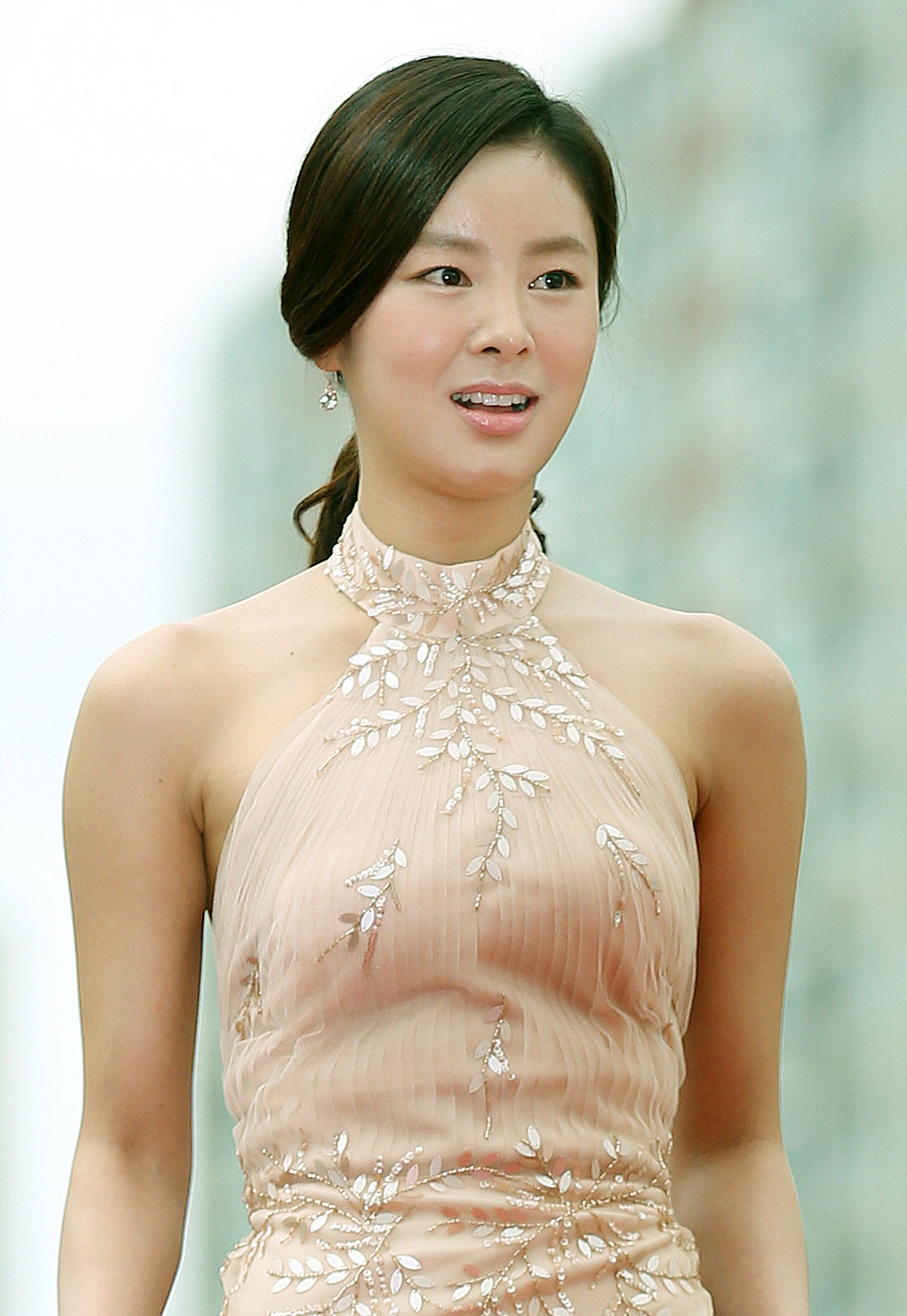
- Han in 2014
- Born: November 6, 1988 (age 37); Busan, South Korea
- Education: Dongduk Women's University - Broadcasting and Entertainment
- Occupation: Actress
- Years active: 2007–present
- Agents: W E&M (present); Koen Group
- Family: Woohee (cousin)

Korean name
- Hangul: 한혜린
- RR: Han Hyerin
- MR: Han Hyerin

Han Hye-rin (Korean: 한혜린; born November 6, 1988) is a South Korean actress. She played the leading role in the television drama My One and Only (2011).

== Filmography ==
=== Film ===
Year	Title	Role
2012	Island of the Gods, Jeju	Jacheongbi
2012	Weird Business	Kim Kwang-ja (segment "The Witch")
2014	Mourning Grave	Hyun-ji
2015	Shoot Me in the Heart	Yoon Bo-ra
2021	Sinkhole	Ahn Hyo-jeong

=== Television series ===
Year	Title	Role
2007	Snow in August	
2008	Lawyers of the Great Republic of Korea	Secretary
2008	General Hospital 2	Jeon Soon-deok
2011	New Tales of Gisaeng	Geum Ra-ra
2011	My One and Only	Na Mugoonghwa
2012	The Sons	Lee Shin-young
2013	Empress Ki	Park Ohjin
2013	Wang's Family	Baek Ji-hwa
2015	My Unfortunate Boyfriend	Jung Hye-mi
2016	Blow Breeze	Jang Ha-yeon
2017	Love Returns	Jung In-woo

=== Variety show ===
Year	Title	Notes
2011	Capture the Moment, How Is That Possible	Host

== Awards and nominations ==
Year	Award	Category	Nominated work	Result
2011	KBS Drama Awards	Best New Actress	My One and Only	Nominated
