= Oh!K =

Southeast Asian pay television channel

- Country: Singapore
- Broadcast area: Singapore; Brunei; Philippines; Thailand
- Headquarters: Singapore

Programming
- Languages: Korean; Filipino; English; Thai; Mandarin; Cantonese; Indonesian; Malay
- Picture format: 1080i HDTV

Ownership
- Owner: Warner Bros. Discovery Asia-Pacific (Warner Bros. Discovery International)
- Sister channels: Cartoon Network Asia; Cartoon Network Philippines; CNN International; Cinemax Asia; HBO Asia; HLN; Warner TV

History
- Launched: 20 October 2014; 12 January 2016 (Hong Kong)
- Closed: 29 January 2019 (Hong Kong); 1 September 2019 (Indonesia); 1 June 2022 (Malaysia); 16 September 2022 (Singapore, Philippines, Brunei and Thailand)

Links
- Website: ohk-tv.com

Oh!K was a Southeast Asian pay television channel owned by Warner Bros. Discovery, with content supplied by MBC.

== Background ==
It was launched on 20 October 2014 on StarHub TV in Singapore. Its programming consists of South Korean drama, entertainment, variety and music programs supplied from Munhwa Broadcasting Corporation.

Oh!K's programming was available subtitled in local languages on optional subtitle tracks, depending on the country of the reception's market.

== Closure ==
Oh!K was discontinued in Malaysia via Astro on 1 June 2022, in Singapore on 15 September 2022 via SingTel TV and on 16 September 2022 via StarHub TV.
