= Han Min-su =

South Korean sledge hockey player (born 1970)

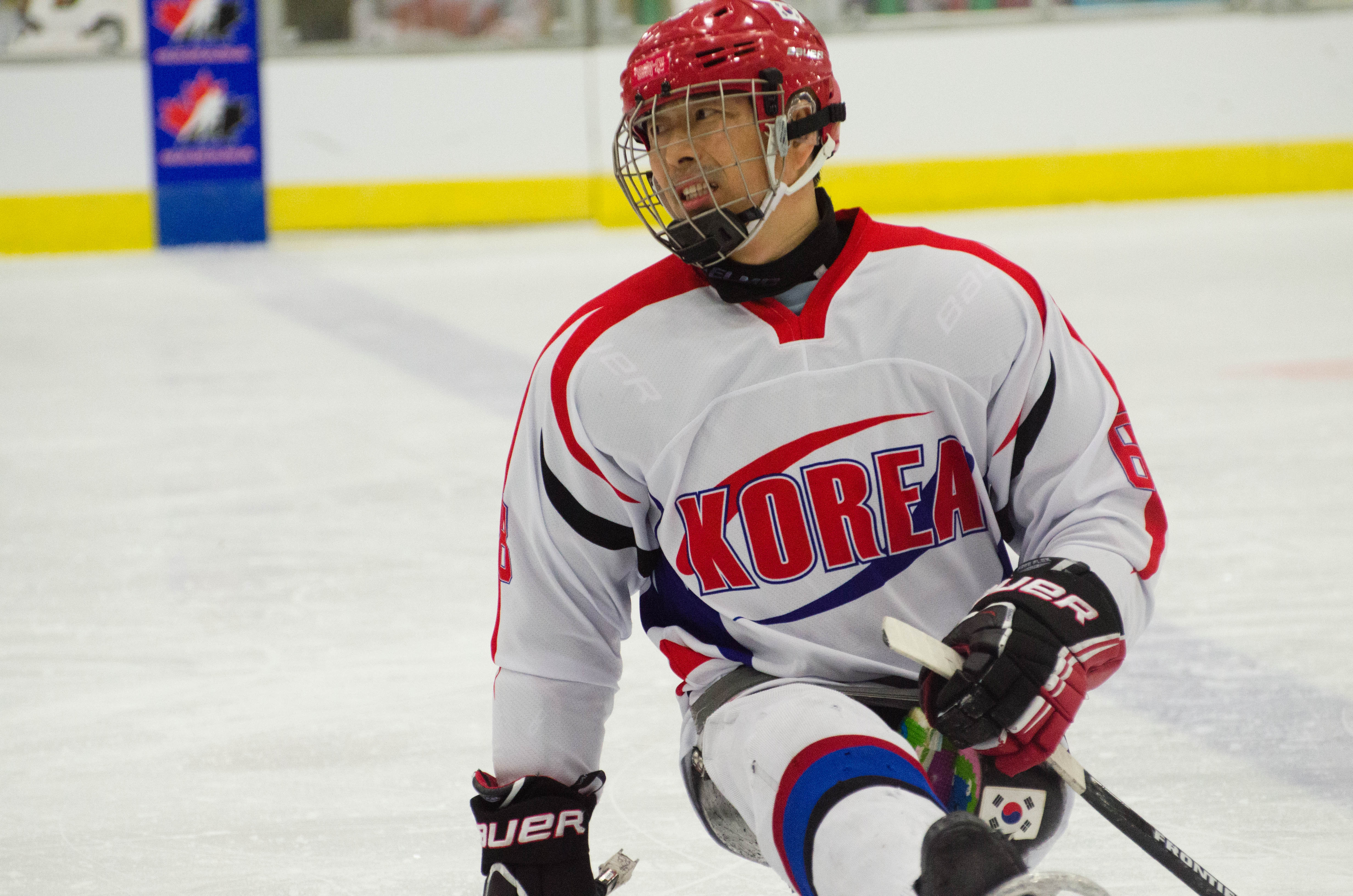
- Han in 2015

Personal information
- Nationality: South Korea
- Born: 3 June 1970 (age 56) Guri-si, Gyeonggi-do, South Korea
Medal record
Para ice hockey
Representing South Korea
Paralympic Games
| Bronze medal – third place | 2018 PyeongChang | Team competition |
World Championships
| Silver medal – second place | 2012 Hamar | Team competition |
| Bronze medal – third place | 2017 Gangneung | Team competition |

Han Min-su (Korean: 한민수; born 3 June 1970) is a South Korean ice sledge hockey player. He played in the 2010 and 2014 Paralympic Winter Games. At the 2010 Games in Vancouver, he was the flag bearer for South Korea. He won a silver medal at the 2012 IPC Ice Sledge Hockey World Championships. Han was a member of South Korea's bronze medal winning team in para ice hockey at the 2018 Winter Paralympics.
