= Han Joo-wan =

South Korean actor

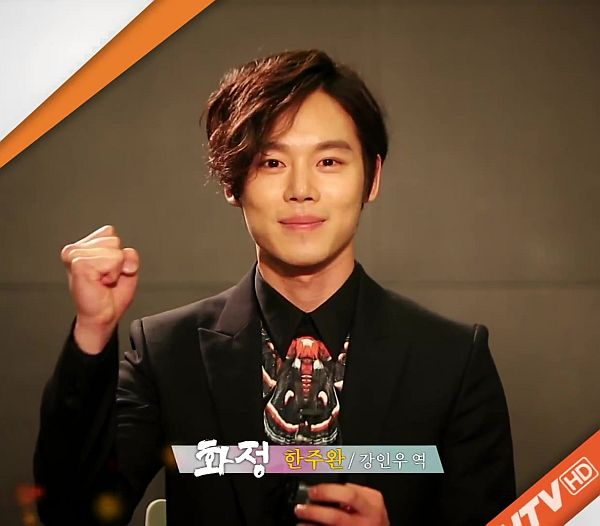
- Han in 2015
- Born: January 10, 1984 (age 42); Gangnam-gu, Seoul, South Korea
- Education: Seoul Institute of the Arts - Theater
- Occupation: Actor
- Years active: 2009–2021

Korean name
- Hangul: 한주완
- Hanja: 韓周完
- RR: Han Juwan
- MR: Han Chuwan

Han Joo-wan (born January 10, 1984) is a South Korean actor. He began his acting career in indie short films such as Leesong Hee-il's queer Suddenly, Last Summer and Lee Sang-woo's Exit (the latter from Jeonju International Film Festival's annual Short! Short! Short! omnibus project). Han rose to mainstream popularity in 2013 in the highly rated ensemble TV drama Wang's Family, which led to him being cast in 2014 period drama Gunman in Joseon.

== Filmography ==
=== Film ===
Year	Title	Role	Notes
2009	A Young Stallman	Hyun-woo	short film
2010	Broken Night	Min-jo	short film
2012	Suddenly, Last Summer	Sang-woo	short film
2013	Where Is My Pepper		short film
2013	Hwayi: A Monster Boy	Entourage of the former chairman	
2013	Short! Short! Short!	Woo-hyun	segment: "Exit"
2017	The Prison	Prisoner in Ik-ho's entourage	
2018	Mothers	Jung-woo	
2019	Money	Baek Jong-pil	

=== Television series ===
Year	Title	Role	Notes
2013	Wang's Family	Choi Sang-nam	
2013	Yeonu's Summer	Kim Yoon-hwan	
2014	Gunman in Joseon	Kim Ho-kyung	
2014	KBS Drama Special	Jang Soo-han	episode: "The Tale of the Bookworm"
2015	Splendid Politics	Kang In-woo	
2016	Devil's Diary	Devil	web drama
2016	Blow Breeze	Jo Hee-dong	
2016	KBS Drama Special	Park Yeong-jung	episode: "Twenty Dollars to Pyongyang"
2017	School 2017	Shim Kang-myung	
2017	Meloholic	Kim Sun-ho	
2021	The Road: The Tragedy of One	Kim Young-shin	

== Discography ==
Year	Song title	Notes
2014	"That Person" (duet with Lee Yoon-ji)	track from Wang's Family OST

== Awards and nominations ==
Year	Award	Category	Nominated work	Result
2013	KBS Drama Awards	Best New Actor	Wang's Family, "Yeonu's Summer"	Won
2013	KBS Drama Awards	Best Actor in a One-Act/Short Drama/Special	"Yeonu's Summer"	Nominated
2014	Miss Supertalent Season 4	Best New Actor	—N/a	Won
2016	MBC Drama Awards	Excellence Award, Actor in a Serial Drama	Blow Breeze	Nominated
2016	KBS Drama Awards	Excellence Award, Actor in a One-Act/Special/Short Drama	"Twenty Dollars to Pyongyang"	Nominated
