= Lee Da-in =

Lee Da-in (Korean: 이다인) is a Korean name consisting of the family name Lee and the given name Da-in, and may also refer to:

- Lee Da-in (actress, born 1985) (born 1985), South Korean actress
- Lee Da-in (actress, born 1992) (born 1992), South Korean actress
- Lee Da-in (born 2008), stage name Rora, South Korean singer and member of South Korean girl group Babymonster
