= Da-in =

- Hangul: 다인
- RR: Dain
- MR: Tain

Da-in (Korean: 다인) is a Korean given name. As of 2026, the name ranked 940th out of 36,179 male names and 41st out of 28,726 female names. A total of 12,427 people, consisting of 353 males and 12,074 females, were born with the name from 2008 to 2026.

Notable people with the name include:

- Lee Da-in (actress, born 1985), South Korean actress
- Lee Da-in (actress, born 1992), South Korean actress
- Lee Da-in, stage name Rora, South Korean singer and member of South Korean girl group Babymonster
- Ryu Da-in, South Korean actress
- Yoo Da-in, birth name Ma Young-seon, South Korean actress
- Son Da-in, South Korean field hockey player

== See also ==
- List of Korean given names
