= Introverted Boss =

2017 South Korean television series

- Promotional poster
- Also known as: Introvert Boss; My Shy Boss; Sensitive Boss
- Hangul: 내성적인 보스
- RR: Naeseongjeogin boseu
- MR: Naesŏngjŏgin posŭ
- Genre: Romance; Comedy
- Created by: Studio Dragon; Choi Jin-hee
- Written by: Joo Hwa-mi
- Directed by: Song Hyun-wook
- Starring: Yeon Woo-jin; Park Hye-su; Gong Seung-yeon; Yoon Park
- Composer: Uhm Ki-yub
- Country of origin: South Korea
- Original language: Korean
- No. of episodes: 16

Production
- Executive producers: Lee Jin-ho; Lee Jae-gil
- Producer: So Jae-hyeon
- Cinematography: Han Dong-hyun
- Editor: Kang Yoon-hee
- Camera setup: Single-camera
- Running time: 70 minutes
- Production companies: KBS Media; Introverted Boss SPC

Original release
- Network: tvN
- Release: January 16 – March 14, 2017

Introverted Boss (Korean: 내성적인 보스; RR: Naeseongjeogin boseu) is a 2017 South Korean television series starring Yeon Woo-jin, Park Hye-su, Gong Seung-yeon, and Yoon Park. It aired on cable network tvN every Monday and Tuesday at 23:00 (KST) from January 16 to March 14, 2017.

== Plot ==
Unbeknownst to his employees, Eun Hwan-ki (Yeon Woo-jin) is the timid CEO of a public relations company. Chae Ro-woon (Park Hye-soo), an energetic woman recognized for her hard work, starts working at Hwan-ki's company and plans to reveal his identity.

== Cast ==
=== Main ===
- Yeon Woo-jin as Eun Hwan-ki, the cold and timid CEO of Brain public relations firm. He avoids people as much as possible by hiding out in his penthouse office or covering himself in a black hoodie.
  - Park Ha-joon as young Eun Hwan-ki
- Park Hye-su as Chae Ro-woon, an outgoing rookie employee who is surprisingly silent at home despite her extroverted nature and excellent communication skills She aims to take revenge on her boss for the death of her sister.
- Gong Seung-yeon as Eun Yi-soo, Hwan-ki's sister who serves as chaebol heiress and is introverted like him. She has mental illness that was initially instigated by her father's long verbal and emotional abuse of her older brother.
  - Seo Eun-sol as young Eun Yi-soo
- Yoon Park as Kang Woo-il, the warm and confident, yet sensitive vice-chairman of Brain public relations firm. He is Hwan-ki's close friend and fiancé of Eun Yi-soo.
  - Lee Tae-woo as young Kang Woo-il

=== Supporting ===
==== People in Silent Monster ====
- Ye Ji-won as Dang Yoo-hee, a working mother
- Jun Hyo-seong as Kim Gyo-ri, an employee who has crush on Se-jong
- Heo Jung-min as Eom Sun-bong
- Han Jae-suk as Jang Se-jong, a new employee

==== People in Brain PR ====
- Stephanie Kim as Director Park
- Jung Yi-yun as Assistant Jung
  - Woo-il's fan club and the elite of Brand Promotions AE
- Hwang So-hee as Assistant Lee
  - Woo-il's fan club and the elite of Brand Promotions AE

=== Others ===
- Kim Eung-soo as Eun Bok-dong, Hwan-ki's father
- Kim Ye-ryeong as Park Ae-ran, Hwan-ki's mother
- Lee Han-wi as Chae Won-sang, Ro-woon's father
- Kim Mi-kyung as Ro-woon's mother
- Han Chae-ah as Chae Ji-hye, Ro-woon's older sister and Kang Woo-il's lover
- Lee Kyu-han as Woo Gi-ja, Ro-woon's neighborhood brother and a reporter
- Jang Hee-jin as Seo Yeon-jung, Hwan-ki's first love

=== Special appearances ===
- Kim Junsu as Top Star (Ep. 1)
- Choi Byung-mo as a presenter
- Kim Ki-doo as a man in the restroom 1 (Ep. 2) / Chinese restaurant food-delivery
- Jo Hyun-shik as a man in the restroom 2
- Choi Joon-ho as a man in the restroom 3
- Song Yung-jae as Won-sang's friend
- Woo Hyun as Won-sang's friend
- Seo Byung-sook as White Cloud Nursery School Director
- Yoo Gun-woo as Secretary Kwak, Won-sang's secretary
- Choi Eun-ho as Il-ho
- Seo In-sung as Lee-ho
- Lee Han-na as Si-yun
- Geum Kwang-san as a people in sauna
- Ji Dae-han as an advertiser for the Opera
- Kim Hye-eun as Hwan-ki's psychiatrist
- Kang Nam-gil as Brain security
- Kim Byung-man as Scrubber in Korean Spa (Ep. 2), Choir conductor (Ep. 4) and Orphanage Event MC (Ep. 6)
- Park Yeong-gyu as Actor Hwang Young-kyu
- Heo Young-ji as Young-kyu's daughter (Ep. 3)
- Kim Dae-hui as Young-kyu's manager
- Park Sang-myun as Master Jin (Ep. 4)
- Choi Dae-chul as Restaurant Owner (Ep. 4)
- Lee Byung-joon as Rose Airlines CEO (Ep. 7)
- Kim Ji-seok as Yu-hui's husband
- Han Suk-joon as Yeon-jung's first love. Also a Kookmin MC

== Production ==
The series reunited writer Joo Hwa-mi and PD Song Hyun-wook of Marriage, Not Dating after two years, with the latter having directed Another Miss Oh in 2016 as well.

The production team stated that the series would stop airing for a week, as they would do extensive rewrites to the scripts in order to make improvements to the drama.

== Original soundtrack ==
=== Part 1 ===
Released on January 17, 2017
| No. | Title | Artists | Length |
|---|---|---|---|
| 1. | "Is it love?" (사랑인 걸까?) | Hong Dae-kwang | 03:58 |
| 2. | "Is it love?" (Inst.) | | 03:58 |
| Total length: | | | 07:56 |

=== Part 2 ===
Released on January 24, 2017
| No. | Title | Artists | Length |
|---|---|---|---|
| 1. | "Memory" | Ben | 04:07 |
| 2. | "Memory" (Inst.) | | 04:07 |
| Total length: | | | 08:14 |

=== Part 3 ===
Released on February 7, 2017
| No. | Title | Artists | Length |
|---|---|---|---|
| 1. | "One More Step" (한 걸음만 더) | Sandeul (B1A4) | 03:45 |
| 2. | "One More Step" (Inst.) | | 03:45 |
| Total length: | | | 07:30 |

=== Part 4 ===
Released on February 14, 2017
| No. | Title | Artists | Length |
|---|---|---|---|
| 1. | "Isn't She Lovely" | Park Bo-ram | 04:02 |
| 2. | "Isn't She Lovely" (Inst.) | | 04:02 |
| Total length: | | | 08:04 |

=== Part 5 ===
Released on February 21, 2017
| No. | Title | Artists | Length |
|---|---|---|---|
| 1. | "Because Of You" | Kim EZ (Ggotjam Project) | 03:16 |
| 2. | "Because Of You" (Inst.) | | 03:16 |
| Total length: | | | 06:32 |

=== Part 6 ===
Released on February 28, 2017
| No. | Title | Artists | Length |
|---|---|---|---|
| 1. | "Suspicious You" (수상한 너) | Ryu Ji-hyun | 02:54 |
| 2. | "Suspicious You" (Inst.) | | 02:54 |
| Total length: | | | 05:48 |

=== Part 7 ===
Released on March 6, 2017
| No. | Title | Artists | Length |
|---|---|---|---|
| 1. | "Round In Circles" (제자리걸음) | Park Si-hwan | 04:04 |
| 2. | "Round In Circles" (Inst.) | | 04:04 |
| Total length: | | | 08:08 |

== Ratings ==
- In this table, the blue numbers represent the lowest ratings and the red numbers represent the highest ratings.
- N/A denotes that the rating is not known.

| Ep. | Original broadcast date | Title | Average audience share | | |
| Ep. | Original broadcast date | Title | AGB Nielsen | | TNmS |
| Ep. | Original broadcast date | Title | Nationwide | Seoul | Nationwide |
|---|---|---|---|---|---|
| 1 | January 16, 2017 | The Phantom of the Opera (오페라의 유령) | 2.967% | 3.227% | 3.5% |
| 2 | January 17, 2017 | I'm Sorry, I Cannot Apologise (미안하다 사과못한다) | 3.046% | 3.464% | 2.4% |
| 3 | January 23, 2017 | I'm Not An Easygoing Person (나는 소탈한 사람이 아닙니다) | 1.907% | 1.494% | 2.1% |
| 4 | January 24, 2017 | I Won't Meet Anyone (아무도 만나지 않는다) | 1.797% | 1.749% | 1.8% |
| 5 | February 6, 2017 | The Unspeakable Secret of 3 Years Ago (3 년 잔, 말할 수 없는 비밀) | 1.639% | 1.812% | 1.8% |
| 6 | February 7, 2017 | How Does a Person Change? (사람이 어떻게 변하니) | 1.260% | —N/a | 1.2% |
| 7 | February 13, 2017 | The Dignity of a Supporting Role (조연의 품격) | 2.131% | 2.015% | 1.5% |
| 8 | February 14, 2017 | Unsocial Socialibity, Immanuel Kant (비사교적 사교성 - 칸트) | 1.980% | 2.167% | 1.5% |
| 9 | February 20, 2017 | If You Listen (귀를 기울이면) | 1.609% | 1.356% | 1.3% |
| 10 | February 21, 2017 | The Pointless Yet Most Helpful Confessions (쓸데없는 짓, 어쩌면 가장 쓸모있는 고백) | 1.677% | —N/a | 1.2% |
| 11 | February 27, 2017 | The Tall Shadow of Mr. Smith (키다리 아저씨의 기다란 그림자) | 1.502% | 1.450% | 1.8% |
| 12 | February 28, 2017 | The Difficulty of Doing Nothing (아무 것도 하지 않는 것의 어려움) | 1.762% | 1.999% | 1.6% |
| 13 | March 6, 2017 | Confession (고백) | 1.578% | 1.686% | 1.7% |
| 14 | March 7, 2017 | My Funny Valentine (마이 퍼니 발렌타인) | 1.631% | 1.713% | 1.5% |
| 15 | March 13, 2017 | One Reason That More Important Than Any Reason (아흔아홉 가지 이유보다 큰 한 가지 이유) | 1.639% | 1.732% | 1.4% |
| 16 | March 14, 2017 | It's Okay To Be Introvert (내성적이어도 괜찮아) | 1.811% | 1.811% | 1.6% |
| Average | | | 1.871% | — (Note: Due to some ratings not recorded, the exact average rating is unknown.) | 1.7% |
| Special | January 6, 2017 | | 2.752% | 2.809% | —N/a |

- This drama aired on a cable channel/pay TV which normally has a relatively smaller audience compared to free-to-air TV/public broadcasters (KBS, SBS, MBC and EBS).
- Episode 5 and 6 were delayed for one week because of the Lunar New Year holiday.

== Awards and nominations ==
| Year | Award | Category | Recipient | Result |
|---|---|---|---|---|
| 2017 | 1st The Seoul Awards | Best New Actress | Gong Seung-yeon | Nominated |
