= Seohyun filmography =

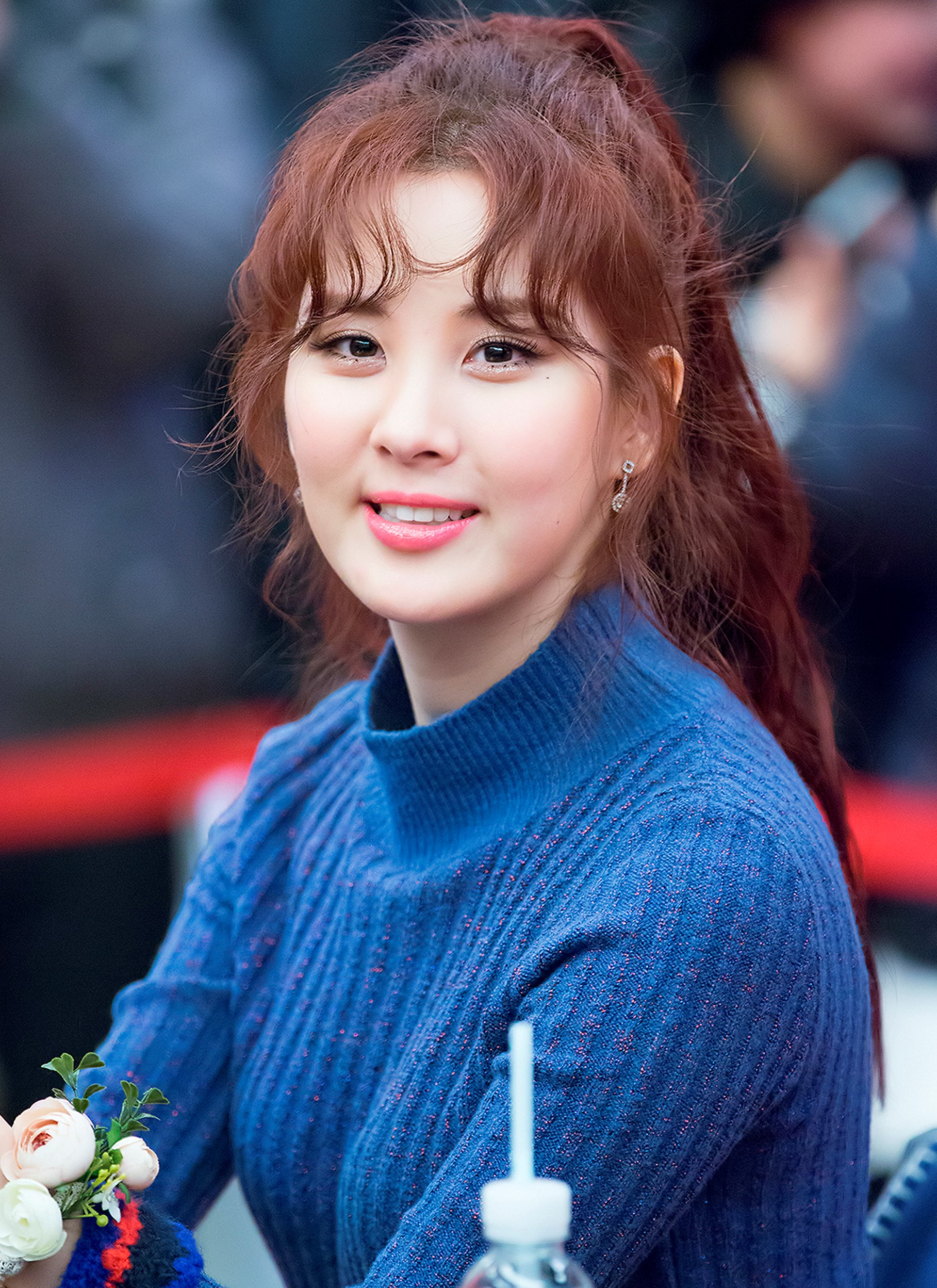
- Seohyun during a fansigning in 2017
- Film: 9
- Television series: 12
- Web series: 2
- Television show: 15
- Hosting: 3

Seo Ju-hyun (known mononymously as Seohyun) is a South Korean singer and actress. She is a member of the girl group Girls' Generation and its sub-unit Girls' Generation-TTS.

Seohyun has pursued an acting career alongside her music activities since 2013. She made her acting debut in the television drama Passionate Love (2013). She later starred in series such as Moon Lovers: Scarlet Heart Ryeo (2016), Bad Thief, Good Thief (2017), Time (2018), Private Lives (2020), and Song of the Bandits (2023). In addition to television, Seo has appeared in films including Love and Leashes (2022), earning recognition for her versatility as an actress.

†	Denotes productions that have not yet been released

== Film ==
Year	Title	Role	Notes	Ref.
2010	Despicable Me	Edith (voice)	Korean dub	
2012	I AM. – SM Town Live World Tour in Madison Square Garden	Herself	Documentary	
2013	Despicable Me 2	Edith (voice)	Korean dub	
2014	My Brilliant Life	Herself	Cameo	
2015	SMTown The Stage	Herself	Documentary	
2016	So I Married An Anti-fan	Irene	Chinese film	
2022	Love and Leashes	Jung Ji-woo		
2025	Holy Night: Demon Hunters	Sharon		
TBA	Seeking the King †	Jeong-ae		

== Television series ==
Year	Title	Role	Notes	Ref.
2008	Unstoppable Marriage	Bulgwang-dong's Seven Princesses Gang	Cameo (episode 64)	
2013	Passionate Love	Han Yoo-rim	Episode 1–5	
2015	The Producers	Herself	Cameo (episode 1)	
2015	Warm and Cozy	Hwang Yoo-ra	Cameo (episode 13)	
2016	Moon Lovers: Scarlet Heart Ryeo	Woo-hee		
2016	Weightlifting Fairy Kim Bok-joo	Hwan-hee	Cameo (episode 12)	
2017	Bad Thief, Good Thief	Kang So-joo		
2018	The Time	Seol Ji-hyun		
2020	Hello Dracula	Ji Anna		
2020	Private Lives	Cha Joo-eun		
2022	Jinxed at First	Lee Seul-bi		
2025	The First Night with the Duke	Cha Seon-chaek		

== Web series ==
Year	Title	Role	Notes	Ref.
2017	Ruby Ruby Love	Lee Ruby		
2023	Song of the Bandits	Nam Hee-shin	Netflix series	

== Television shows ==
Year	Title	Role	Notes	Ref.
2010–2011	We Got Married: Season 2	Main cast	with Yonghwa (episodes 29–80)	
2012–2013	Show! Music Core	Co-host	with Taeyeon and Tiffany	
2017	Seohyun Home	Main host		

== Hosting ==
Year	Title	Notes	Ref.
2017	31st Golden Disc Awards	with Jung Yong-hwa, and Hwang Chi-yeul	
2019–present	The Fact Music Awards	with Jun Hyun-moo (2019–2020, 2022) Shin Dong-yup and Boom	
2024	2024 KBS Drama Awards	with Moon Sang-min and Jang Sung-kyu	
