= Seeking the King =

Upcoming film by Won Shi-yun

- Teaser poster
- Hangul: 왕을 찾아서
- Hanja: 王을 찾아서
- Lit.: In Search of the King
- RR: Wangeul chajaseo
- MR: Wangŭl ch'ajasŏ
- Directed by: Won Shin-yun
- Written by: Won Shin-yun
- Starring: Koo Kyo-hwan; Yoo Jae-myung; Seohyun
- Production companies: With A Studio; 8 Pictures; A2Z Entertainment
- Distributed by: Com2uS N
- Country: South Korea
- Language: Korean

Seeking the King (Korean: 왕을 찾아서) is an upcoming South Korean science fiction film directed and written by Won Shin-yun, and starring Koo Kyo-hwan, Yoo Jae-myung, and Seohyun. The film tells the story of a young man encountering a giant robot during the most tragic era in modern Korean history. It was scheduled for release in 2024 but was postponed for unknown reasons.

== Premise ==
It follows the adventures of military doctor Do-jin and the villagers in the Demilitarized Zone as they encounter a giant, unidentified guest in the summer of 1980.

== Cast ==
- Koo Kyo-hwan as Kim Do-jin
- Yoo Jae-myung as Ju-bok
- Seohyun as Jeong-ae
- Park Ye-rin as Deok-jin
- Park Myung-hoon as Gwan-u: a company commander of the 66th Infantry Regiment who has a crush on Jeong-ae.
- Yu Seong-ju as Lee Seo-yeol

== Production ==
=== Development and filming ===
Director Won Shin-yun, who worked on The Suspect (2013), Memoir of a Murderer (2017), and The Battle: Roar to Victory (2019), directed and written the film.

First script reading was completed on February 3, 2023.

In 2023, the shooting of the film began in Jeju Island on February 13, and wrapped up in Mungyeong on July 20. Meanwhile, WYSIWYG Studio (now Com2uS N), which has established itself with outstanding VFX technology in The Witch: Part 1. The Subversion (2018) and Space Sweepers (2021), participated as the main investor of the film while With A Studio is in charged of overall production and 8 Pictures, founded by director Won, and A2Z Entertainment, a subsidiary of WYSIWYG Studio, are in charged of co-production. The film was in post-production with the goal of being released in the summer of 2024, but was postponed for unknown reasons.

=== Casting ===
Koo Kyo-hwan, Yoo Jae-myung, and Seohyun were cast to play the lead roles of the film. They were officially confirmed in February 2023, along with Park Ye-rin, Park Myung-hoon, and Yu Seong-ju.
