= Han Groo =

South Korean entertainer (born 1992)

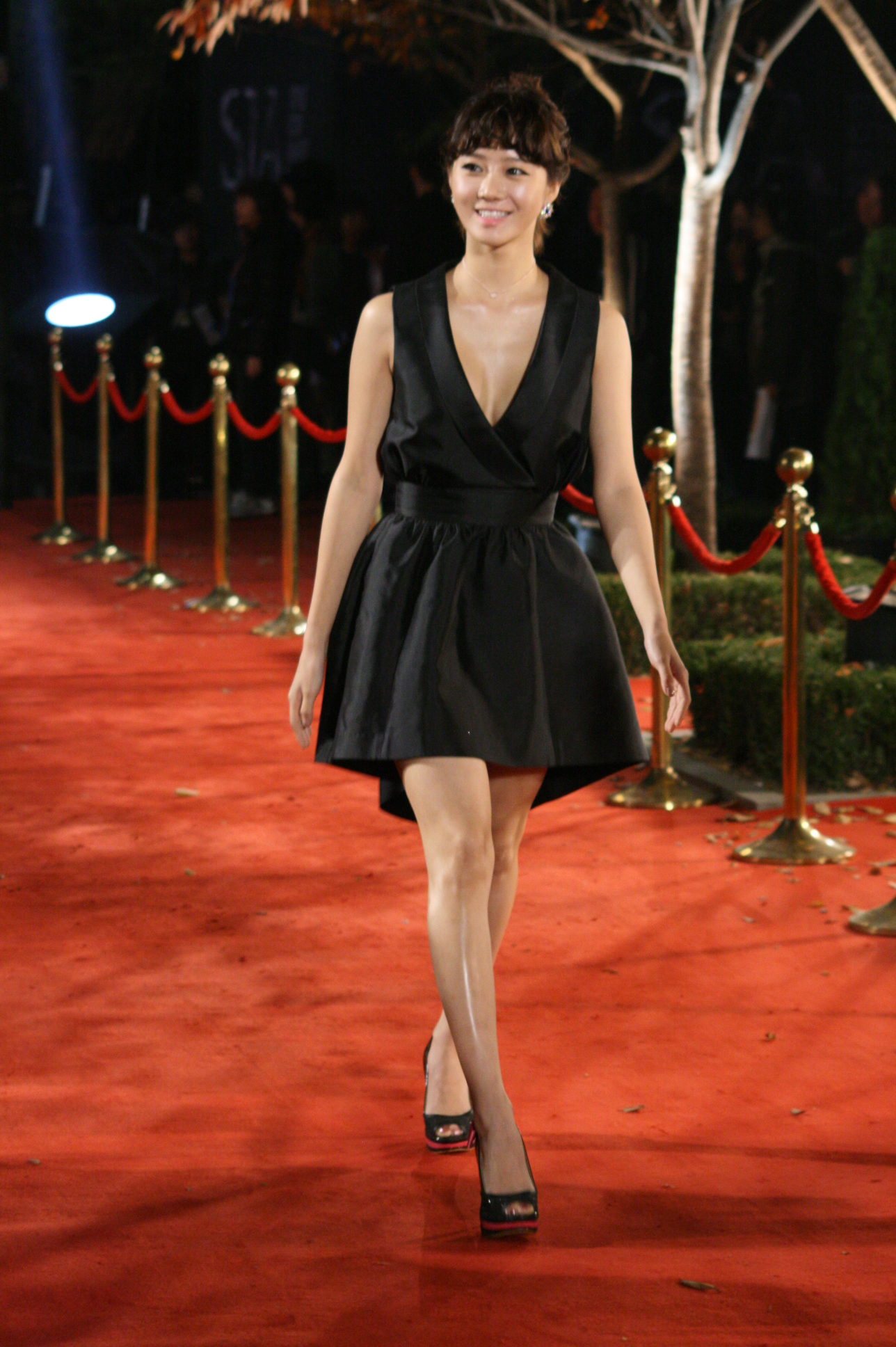
- Han in 2011
- Born: Min Han-groo; May 29, 1992 (age 34); Namyangju, South Korea
- Occupations: Actress; singer
- Years active: 2011–2015; 2022–present
- Agent: SBD Entertainment
- Spouse: Unknown (m. 2015; div. 2022)
- Children: 2

Korean name
- Hangul: 민한그루
- RR: Min Hangeuru
- MR: Min Han'gŭru

Stage name
- Hangul: 한그루
- RR: Han Geuru
- MR: Han Kŭru

Han Groo (Korean: 한그루; born May 29, 1992), birth name Min Han-groo, is a South Korean actress and singer.

== Early life ==
Han Groo was born in Namyangju, South Korea. When she was in fourth grade, her family moved to the United States, where she studied at Acacia Elementary School in California, and Ladera Vista Junior High School in California. Han Groo excelled at her academic studies to the extent that she won a U.S. President's Education Award in 2003. She also had an extensive background in the dancing since middle school, winning prizes at the several competitions for hip hop dance, jazz dance and tap dance.

After four years in the US, her family moved again, this time to China, where Han Groo entered the Beijing International Art School. She became fluent in both English and Mandarin Chinese, while continuing to dance and engage in various activities such as horse riding, martial arts, swordsmanship, and golf. Han Groo's family stayed in China for another four years before returning to Korea.

== Career ==
Han Groo's father is a TV commercial director and her mother used to be a professional model, which made her familiar with and naturally drawn to show business from a very early age. Upon her return to Korea, the aspiring actress signed with the management agency Climix Academy. But at her agency's suggestion, she launched a singing career in 2011 with the EP GROO ONE, followed by the single My Boy. She was nominated as Best New Female Artist at the 2011 Mnet Asian Music Awards. Han Groo later admitted that acting was her real passion from the beginning, but she had wanted to grab whatever opportunities available to her. However, she found it difficult to stand out as a singer given the huge level of competition in Korea's music industry, especially among girl groups riding the coattails of the K-pop revolution.

Later in 2011, she made her acting debut when she landed the leading role in Girl K (also known as Killer K), beating out 100 other audition hopefuls. The three-episode drama, which aired on cable channel CGV, centers on a Nikita-like character who vows to hunt down her mother's killer and joins a secret organization that trains her to become an assassin, all while attending high school. Han Groo performed most of her action stunts herself, and audiences were impressed, as Girl K ranked number one in its timeslot.

She then joined her first network series, the MBC daily drama Just Like Today, saying that when she read the script, she felt instantly attached because of the character's similarities to her real-life personality, someone "who's bright and positive despite her difficult situation." After supporting roles in The Scandal and One Warm Word, Han Groo returned to cable in the romantic comedies Can We Get Married? (2012) and Marriage, Not Dating (2014), playing female protagonists who fall for bachelors with commitment issues.

In June 2022, Han signed with SBD Entertainment, prefiguring a potential comeback in the entertainment industry after seven years away.

== Personal life ==
Han Groo married her non-celebrity boyfriend in a private setting in November 2015. In March 2017, she gave birth to twins. On September 27, 2022, Han revealed that she had divorced after 7 years of marriage. Han also decided to take custody of the twins.

== Filmography ==
=== Television series ===
| Year | Title | Role |
|---|---|---|
| 2011 | Girl K | Cha Yeon-jin |
| 2011 | Just Like Today | Kim Mi-ho |
| 2012 | Can We Get Married? | Min Dong-bi |
| 2013 | The Scandal | Ha Soo-young |
| 2013 | KBS Drama Special: "My Dad Is a Nude Model" | Ji-yeon |
| 2013 | One Warm Word | Na Eun-young |
| 2014 | Marriage, Not Dating | Joo Jang-mi / Annie Joo |
| 2015 | Super Daddy Yeol | Laura Jang (cameo, episodes 8-9) |
| 2024 | The Midnight Studio | Jin Na-rae |
| 2024–2025 | Cinderella Game | Goo Ha-na |

=== Variety show ===
| Year | Title | Notes |
|---|---|---|
| 2011 | Fun Quiz Club | |
| 2011 | Soo-mi Ok | |
| 2011–2012 | Project Serenade (season 2) | MC |

== Discography ==
| Album information | Track listing |
|---|---|
| GROO ONE: EP; Released: January 12, 2011; Label: Climix, KT Music | Track listing: 1. Paradise; 2. Witch Girl; 3. Sf (Ok, Here We Go) - feat. Dk4Rg; 4. 쉿~! 비밀; 5. Paradise (Inst.); 6. Witch Girl (Inst.) |
| My Boy: Digital single; Released: March 17, 2011; Label: Climix, KT Music | Track listing: 1. My Boy; 2. My Boy (Inst.) |
| Girl K Part 1 OST: Digital single; Released: August 17, 2011; Label: CJ E&M | Track listing: 1. My Turn; 2. My Turn (Inst.) |
| Just Like Today OST: Digital single; Released: December 2, 2011; Label: Climix, KT Music | Track listing: 1. 오늘을 사랑해 (Today, I Love You); 2. 오늘을 사랑해 (Inst.); 3. 오늘을 사랑해 (Piano Solo) |

== Awards and nominations ==
| Year | Award | Category | Nominee / Work | Result |
|---|---|---|---|---|
| 2003 | President's Education Award (USA) | —N/a | Han Groo | Won |
| 2011 | 13th Mnet Asian Music Awards | Best New Female Artist | Groo One | Nominated |
| 2011 | 19th Korean Culture and Entertainment Awards | Best New Actress – Drama | Just Like Today | Won |
| 2014 | 50th Baeksang Arts Awards | Best New Actress – Television | One Warm Word | Nominated |
| 2014 | 7th Style Icon Awards | New Icon | Han Groo | Won |
| 2014 | SBS Drama Awards | New Star Award | One Warm Word | Won |
| 2014 | SBS Drama Awards | Best Couple Award | Han Groo (with Park Seo-joon); One Warm Word | Nominated |
| 2016 | tvN10 Awards | Best Kiss Award | Han Groo (with Yeon Woo-jin); Marriage, Not Dating | Nominated |

Awards in Dance
- 2005 Hall of Fame Dance Challenge (USA): 2nd place, Tap
- 2005 Hall of Fame Dance Challenge (USA): 3rd place, Jazz
- 2005 Hall of Fame Dance Challenge (USA): 2nd place, Hip hop
- 2003 American Stage: 3rd place, Lyrical dance
- 2003 Starpower Dance Competition (USA): 3rd place, Tap
- 2003 Dancesport Dance Competition (USA): 1st place, Hip hop
- 2003 Showbiz Dance Competition (USA): 2nd place, Jazz
- 2003 Dance USA: 1st place, Hip hop
