= I Wanna Hear Your Song =

2019 South Korean television series

- Promotional poster
- Hangul: 너의 노래를 들려줘
- Lit.: Let Me Hear Your Song
- RR: Neoui noraereul deullyeojwo
- MR: Nŏŭi noraerŭl tŭllyŏjwŏ
- Genre: Romantic comedy; Mystery
- Developed by: KBS Drama Production
- Written by: Kim Min-joo
- Directed by: Lee Jung-mi
- Starring: Yeon Woo-jin; Kim Se-jeong; Song Jae-rim; Park Ji-yeon
- Country of origin: South Korea
- Original language: Korean
- No. of episodes: 32 (Note: In order to circumvent Korean laws that prevent commercial breaks in the middle of an episode, what would previously have been aired as single 70 minute episodes are now being repackaged as two 35 minute episodes, with two episodes being shown each night with a commercial break between the two.)

Production
- Producers: Park Hee-seol; Jung Sung-taek
- Camera setup: Single-camera
- Running time: 35 minutes
- Production companies: JP E&M

Original release
- Network: KBS2
- Release: August 5 – September 24, 2019

I Wanna Hear Your Song (Korean: 너의 노래를 들려줘) is a 2019 South Korean television series starring Yeon Woo-jin, Kim Se-jeong, Song Jae-rim and Park Ji-yeon. It aired on KBS2 from August 5 to September 24, 2019. Filming for the series began in April and spanned five months.

The series ranked among the Top 10 highest ranking dramas in South Korea during its whole run.

== Synopsis ==
Hong Yi-young witnessed a murder but she cannot remember anything about what happened. With the help of Jang Yoon, she tries to recover her memories from that day.

== Cast ==
=== Main ===
- Yeon Woo-jin as "Jang Yoon"/Jang Do-hoon

A pianist in an orchestra who is Tone Deaf. He helps Yi-young with her insomnia.

- Kim Se-jeong as Hong Yi-young

A timpanist who suffers from insomnia. She can only fall asleep if she listens to a tone-deaf person sing.

- Song Jae-rim as Nam Joo-wan

An orchestra conductor who has a lot of charisma.

- Park Ji-yeon as Ha Eun-joo

A violinist in the orchestra who is known for her arrogance.

=== Supporting ===
==== People around Jang Yoon ====
- Jung Sung-mo as Jang Seok-hyeon

Jang Yoon's father. He has a very cold personality.

==== People around Hong Yi-young ====
- Yoon Bok-in as Park Yeong-hee

Ji-seop's wife

- Park Chan-hwan as Hong Ji-seop

Yi-young's uncle

- Lee Si-won as Hong Soo-yeong

Yi-young's cousin

==== Others ====
- Lee Byung-joon as Song Jae-hwan
- Jo Mi-ryung as Seo Soo-hyang
- Kim Sang-gyun as Moon Jae-hyeong

Yi-young's ex-boyfriend

- Yoon Joo-hee as Yoon Mi-rae
- Hong Seung-hee as Yang Soo-jang
- Yang Soo-jung as Yang Soo-jung (secretary)
- Yoo Gun as Michael Lee
- Lee Jung-min as Choi Seo-joo
- Cho Yu-jung as Yoo Je-ni

=== Special appearances ===
- Jung Soo-young as Gong Su-mi (Ep. 1,7,9)

Pianist who was fired by Joo-wan.

- Im Ji-kyu as Yi-young's blind date (Ep. 10)
- Kim Si-hoo as Kim Ian/real Jang Yoon

Jang Do-hoon's brother who died mysteriously 1 year ago.

== Original soundtrack ==
I Wanna Hear Your Song OST Album

Soundtrack album by Various artists
- Released: 2019
- Genre: Soundtrack
- Language: Korean

=== Part 1 ===
Released on August 12, 2019
No.	Title	Artist	Length
1.	"Stay With Me" (박준호)	Kim Nam-joo (feat. PULLIK)	03:27
2.	"Stay With Me" (Inst.)		03:27
Total length:			06:54

=== Part 2 ===
Released on August 19, 2019
No.	Title	Artist	Length
1.	"I Wanna Hear Your Song" (너의 노래를 들려줘)	O.WHEN	04:06
2.	"I Wanna Hear Your Song" (Inst.)		04:06
Total length:			08:12

=== Part 3 ===
Released on August 26, 2019
No.	Title	Artist	Length
1.	"One Blue Night" (어느 파란 밤)	Park Ji-yeon	04:46
2.	"One Blue Night" (Inst.)		04:46
Total length:			09:42

=== Part 4 ===
Released on September 2, 2019
No.	Title	Artist	Length
1.	"Cry"	Kim Yeon-ji (feat. SARAH)	03:21
2.	"Cry" (Inst.)		03:21
Total length:			06:42

== Ratings ==
In this table, the blue numbers represent the lowest ratings and the red numbers represent the highest ratings.

Ep.	Original broadcast date	AGB Nielsen (Nationwide)
1	August 5, 2019	2.7%
2	August 5, 2019	3.3%
3	August 6, 2019	2.8%
4	August 6, 2019	4.0%
5	August 12, 2019	2.2%
6	August 12, 2019	2.7%
7	August 13, 2019	2.4%
8	August 13, 2019	3.2%
9	August 19, 2019	2.3%
10	August 19, 2019	3.1%
11	August 20, 2019	2.4%
12	August 20, 2019	3.2%
13	August 26, 2019	2.3%
14	August 26, 2019	2.9%
15	August 27, 2019	3.2%
16	August 27, 2019	3.7%
17	September 2, 2019	2.5%
18	September 2, 2019	2.8%
19	September 3, 2019	2.4%
20	September 3, 2019	2.5%
21	September 9, 2019	2.8%
22	September 9, 2019	3.4%
23	September 10, 2019	3.0%
24	September 10, 2019	3.7%
25	September 16, 2019	2.7%
26	September 16, 2019	3.2%
27	September 17, 2019	3.3%
28	September 17, 2019	3.6%
29	September 23, 2019	3.0%
30	September 23, 2019	3.5%
31	September 24, 2019	3.6%
32	September 24, 2019	4.0%
Average		3.0%

== International broadcast ==
Year	Platform / Network	Region Of Origin
2020	VTV3	Vietnam
2021	TVB	Hong Kong
2021	Weilei TV	Taiwan

=== Streaming Platforms ===
Year	Platform / Network	Region
2019	myTV SUPER	Hong Kong
2019	LINE TV	Taiwan
2022
2022	MX Player	India

== Awards ==
Year	Award	Category	Nominee	Result
2019	34th KBS Drama Awards	Hallyu Star Award	Kim Se-jeong	Won
2019	34th KBS Drama Awards	Excellence Award - Actress in a Miniseries	Kim Se-jeong	Nominated
2019	34th KBS Drama Awards	Best Couple Award	Kim Se-jeong and Yeon Woo-jin	Nominated
