= Beastie Girls =

- Film poster
- Hangul: 비스티 걸스
- RR: Biseuti geolseu
- MR: Pisŭt'i kŏlsŭ
- Directed by: Sin Ji-woo
- Written by: Kim Tae-kyun
- Produced by: Kim Tae-kyun
- Starring: Go Eun-ah; Yoo So-young; Kim Seo-ji
- Cinematography: Choi Deok-gyu; Lee Seung-min
- Edited by: Kim Jin-hee
- Music by: Oh Seung-eun
- Production company: Mago Film
- Distributed by: Mago Film
- Release date: July 13, 2017 (South Korea)
- Running time: 108 minutes
- Country: South Korea
- Language: Korean

Beastie Girls is a 2017 South Korean erotic romance drama film directed by Sin Ji-woo.

== Cast ==
- Go Eun-ah as Seo-hyeon
- Yoo So-young as Ji-yeon
- Kim Seo-ji as Soo-jeong
- Lee Jung-hyuk as Soo-hyeok
- Shin Min-chul as Kang-min
- Jang Tae-seong as Seong-gyoo
- Ha Tae-seong as Woo-seok
- Ryoo Seong-hyeon as Representative (special appearance)
