= Salamander Guru and The Shadows =

2012 South Korean sitcom

- Also known as: Salamander Guru and the Shadow Operation Team; Salamander Guru and the Gang
- Genre: Comedy, Drama
- Created by: Seo Eun-jung
- Directed by: Park Seung-min
- Starring: Choi Min-ho; Ryu Hyun-kyung; Im Won-hee; Lee Byung-joon; Oh Dal-su
- Country of origin: South Korea
- Original language: Korean
- No. of episodes: 10

Production
- Production location: Seoul
- Running time: Fridays at 23:00 (KST)
- Production company: Chorokbaem Media

Original release
- Network: Seoul Broadcasting System
- Release: January 27 – March 30, 2012

Salamander Guru and The Shadows (Korean: 도롱뇽도사와 그림자 조작단; RR: Dorongnyongdosawa geurimja jojakdan) is a 2012 South Korean sitcom starring Choi Min-ho, Ryu Hyun-kyung, Im Won-hee, Lee Byung-joon and Oh Dal-su. It aired on SBS from January 27 to March 30, 2012, on Fridays at 23:00 for 10 episodes. It is SBS's first sitcom in 5 years.

== Synopsis ==
Min-hyuk (Choi Minho), an antisocial genius hacker, has played with computers as if they were toys since he was a little boy. He grows up learning hacking skills from his father, a terminally ill computer genius who runs an illegal gambling den to provide for his family's future. After his dad dies, Min-hyuk is adopted abroad. He immerses himself in computers and develops social phobia. When he turns 20, he returns to Korea and begins searching for X, who drove his father to his death. Following clues from his memories, he finds the Salamander Guru fortune-telling house and meets Seon-dal and Won-sam. To find the Salamander Guru who knows X's secrets, Min-hyuk has no choice but to help the fake gurus. With his brains and excellent hacking skills, Min-hyuk controls Seon-dal behind a mirror and finds codes his dad left by recalling his childhood memories one by one. Min-hyuk, who keeps his social phobia a secret, gradually opens himself up while living with Seon-dal and Won-sam.

== Cast ==
=== Main characters ===
- Choi Min-ho as Min-hyuk (Hacker)
- Ryu Hyun-kyung as Kyung-ja (Detective)
- Im Won-hee as Won-sam (Assistant Guru)
- Lee Byung-joon as Beom-gyu (the Real Salamander Guru)
- Oh Dal-su as Seon-dal (Swindler)
- Kim Gyu-sun as Gyu-sun
- Yoon Sang-ho as Detective Yoon

=== Cameos ===
- Son Ho-young as Kim Shi-hoo, Gyu-sun's boyfriend (episodes 1, 10)
- Ahn Suk-hwan as PalSungPa gangster boss (episode 2)
- Dynamic Duo (episode 2)
- Taeyeon as Tae-yeon (episode 3)
- Kim Myung-soo as L (episode 3)
- Yong Jun-hyung as Joker (episode 3)
- Hwang Kwang-hee (episode 3)
- Taemin as Lee Tae-min, Master of Disguise/Forger (episodes 4, 10)
- Son Na-eun as Lee Tae-eun, Taemin's sister (episode 4)
- G.NA as Crystal (episode 4)
- Jun Hyo-seong as Soo-yeon (episode 4)
- Leeteuk (episode 4)
- Key (episode 4)
- Lee Joo-yeon as Shi-ra (episode 5)
- Alex Chu as Ji-hoon (episode 5)
- Lee Hyun-woo as Hyun-woo (episode 5)
- Lee Ji-eun as IU (episode 6)
- Tiger JK as Tiger (episode 6)
- Tak Jae-hoon as Seung-hoon
- Lee Se-eun as Customer (episode 7)
- Han Seung-yeon as Seung-yeon (episode 8)
- Kim Eun-jung as Ji-min (episode 8)
- Im Soo-hyang as Im Soo-min (episode 8)
- G.O as Myung-shik (episode 8)
- Han Ji-hoo as Chan-woo (episode 8)

== Original soundtrack ==
Part 1:
No.	Title	Artist	Length
1.	"Notebook (노트북)"	8Eight	3:29
2.	"Notebook – Instrumental (노트북 – 연주곡)"	8Eight	3:29

Part 2:
No.	Title	Artist	Length
1.	"I Love You (사랑한다)"	Sunny Hill	3:20
2.	"I Love You – Instrumental (사랑한다 – 연주곡)"	Sunny Hill	3:20

Part 3:
No.	Title	Artist	Length
1.	"Waiting (기다린다)"	Jo Hyun-ah	4:09
2.	"Waiting – Instrumental (기다린다 – 연주곡)"	Jo Hyun-ah	4:09

== Ratings ==
In the table below, the blue numbers represent the lowest ratings and the red numbers represent the highest ratings.

Episode #	Original broadcast date	TNmS Ratings (Nationwide)
1	27 January 2012	5.1%
2	3 February 2012	5.1%
3	10 February 2012	4.2%
4	17 February 2012	4.8%
5	24 February 2012	?
6	2 March 2012	4.6%
7	9 March 2012	3.9%
8	16 March 2012	4.5%
9	23 March 2012	3.7%
10	30 March 2012	3.1%
