= Loner (film) =

- Theatrical poster
- Directed by: Park Jae-shik
- Written by: Park Jae-shik; Kim Min-jun; Jung Bum-shik; Jun Im
- Produced by: Lee Ho-seong
- Starring: Go Eun-ah; Jeong Yoo-seok; Chae Min-seo
- Cinematography: Lee Seung-min
- Edited by: Lee Hye-yeon
- Distributed by: Sungwon I Com
- Release date: September 18, 2008
- Running time: 117 minutes
- Country: South Korea
- Language: Korean
- Box office: US$412,300

Loner (Korean: 외톨이; RR: Oetori; also known as Orphaned or Hikikomori) is a 2008 South Korean horror film directed by Park Jae-shik, who co-wrote the screenplay with Kim Min-jun, Jung Bum-shik, and Jun Im. It is Park's feature film directorial debut and stars Go Eun-ah, Jeong Yoo-seok, and Chae Min-seo. The film explores the phenomenon of hikikomori, a Japanese term referring to reclusive individuals who have chosen to entirely withdraw from the outside world.

== Plot ==
Jeong Soo-na is a 17-year-old high school student who lives with her uncle, Se-jin and grandmother in a large mansion. Her bullied best friend, Lee Han-jeong is subjected to a cruel public prank that pushes her to commit suicide. Affected by this, Soo-na becomes agoraphobic. Han-jeong's bully arrives to apologize, only to find Han-jeong's dead body littered with blood and vermin. The news drives Soo-na over the edge, while Han-jeong's bully commits suicide from the trauma of what she has caused.

Soo-na's withdrawal from society affects her family. It's made worse when Se-jin's old flame, Han Song-i, meets with Se-jin, only to be followed and beaten by Soo-na's grandmother, who refuses to let her see Soo-na. During dinner, Soo-na, in a trance, recounts a story to Se-jin's fiancée, Choi Yoon-mi, that implies that Se-jin is actually her father, not her uncle, and Song-i is her mother, and that the two were involved in a teacher-student romance until Se-jin abandoned her. Song-i then married a man who abused her every day. Yoon-mi is furious when Se-jin avoids her questions and states that she will not talk to him unless he explains.

Soo-na's condition worsens, with vermin starting to appear on her body. When the housemaid enters Soo-na's room, she is knocked out and fitted inside a barrel with the corpse of the Jeong's dog. Soo-na's grandmother attempts to reach Soo-na's room by a ladder but Soo-na kicks it, breaking her grandmother's back. That night, a figure makes her kill her grandmother.

Song-i is found dead on the railway. Upon hearing this, Se-jin talks to Soo-na through her bedroom door, stating that he left Song-i not because he stopped loving her, but because she was already married by the time he was discharged from the army. When Se-jin falls asleep later, Soo-na observes her mother's spirit fondling him. Yoon-mi learns that Se-jin and Song-i have a second daughter, Kim Mi-jeong, who lives with her mother. She quickly goes to Se-jin's mansion, where Se-jin is about to commit suicide until he sees what appears to be Soo-na. He is knocked out and upon waking, discovers Yoon-mi motionless in Soo-na's bed. He sees Soo-na about to jump, only to realize that she is not Soo-na; she is actually Mi-jeong. Mi-jeong jumps and dies from impalement.

Soo-na is transferred to a mental facility, where she admits to letting Mi-jeong plot against their father and grandmother, since Mi-jeong, who had to live in an abusive family life with her stepfather, was jealous of Soo-na's happy life with her father. Se-jin learns that Mi-jeong was the one with Soo-na in her room, and was the one who had committed all the murders and horrible things in their house. The film ends with Se-jin piercing a knife into his table as vermin covers him, indicating that he is becoming agoraphobic.

== Cast ==
- Go Eun-ah as Jeong Soo-na
- Jeong Yu-seok as Jeong Se-jin
- Chae Min-seo as Choi Yoon-mi
- Jeong Yeong-sook as Grandmother
- Lim Dae-ho as Gwan Ri-in
- Lee Da-in as Lee Ha-jeong
- Lee Yeon-soo as Han Song-i
- Lee Eun as Lee Eun-hee
- Jeong Da-hye as Teacher
- Song Min-jeong as Kim Mi-jeong

== Production ==
The set of the mansion cost US$300,000 to build, and took a month to construct.

== Release ==
Loner was released in South Korea on 18 September 2008, and on its opening weekend was ranked seventh at the box office with 45,710 admissions. As of 5 October, the film had received a total of 74,753 admissions, and as of 12 October had grossed a total of US$412,300.

== Critical response ==
James Mudge of Beyond Hollywood described Loner as "one of the better and more thoughtful films of its type for some time", and said, "The film features some skilfully sustained tension and a palpable sense of dread, as well as an overbearing sense that things are unlikely to work out well for any of the characters, even for those who manage to make it through to the end credits. Whilst there are a few death scenes and some good use of special effects, the film is generally quite low key, and is arguably all the better for it, as this ensures that the psychological chills remain at the fore."
