= Chae Min-seo =

South Korean actress (born 1981)

- Born: Jo Soo-jin; March 16, 1981 (age 45); South Korea
- Occupation: Actress
- Years active: 2002–present

Korean name
- Hangul: 조수진
- RR: Jo Sujin
- MR: Cho Sujin

Stage name
- Hangul: 채민서
- RR: Chae Minseo
- MR: Ch'ae Minsŏ

Chae Min-seo (born Jo Soo-jin; March 16, 1981) is a South Korean actress. Chae made her acting debut in 2002 with Champion, and has since played leading roles in horror film The Wig and the indies Loner (2008), Vegetarian (2010), Sookhee (2014) and Young Mother: What's Wrong with My Age? (2015). She actually shaved her head for the movie The Wig.

== Filmography ==
=== Film ===
Year	Title	Role
2002	Champion	Lee Kyeong-mi
2004	Don't Tell Papa	Ae-ran
2005	Aegis	Joon-hee
2005	The Wig	Soo-hyeon/Hee-joo
2008	Loner	Choi Yoon-mi
2008	Sweet Lie	young Han Ji-ho (voice)
2010	Vegetarian	Young-hye
2013	Superman Kang Bo-sang	
2014	Sookhee	Sook-hee
2015	Young Mother: What's Wrong with My Age?	Jin-hee
2016	Camping	Seon-yeong

=== Television series ===
Year	Title	Role
2003	Age of Warriors	Queen Seongpyeong
2003	Pearl Necklace	Oh Yeon-jung
2005	Banjun Drama: "Message"	
2005	Banjun Drama: "Contact Lens"	
2007	Romance Hunter	Song Han-na
2007	Bad Couple	Kim Se-yeon
2007	War of Money - Bonus Round	Beautiful lady (cameo)
2008	Medical Gibang Cinema	Jung-sun
2010	You Don't Know Women	Oh Yoo-ran
2019	Babel	The wife of the captain of the crashed helicopter

=== Variety show ===
Year	Title	Notes
2009	Real Story Tomb	Host
2012	Chuseok Special Star Love Village	
