= Go Eun-ah =

South Korean actress (born 1988)

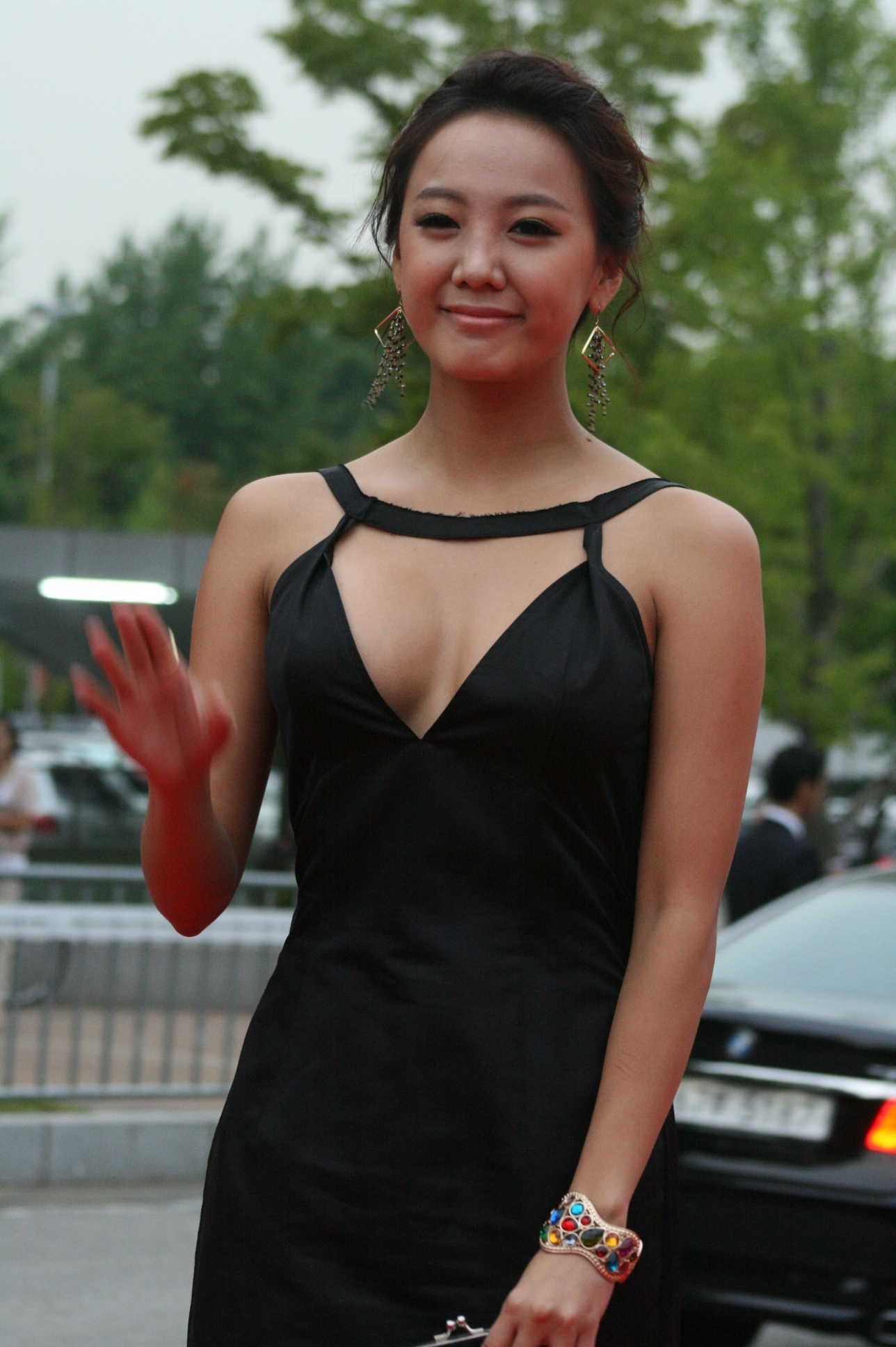
- Go in 2009
- Born: October 28, 1988 (age 36); Jangseong, South Jeolla Province, South Korea
- Occupation: Actress
- Relatives: Mir (brother)

Korean name
- Hangul: 방효진
- RR: Bang Hyojin
- MR: Pang Hyojin

Stage name
- Hangul: 고은아
- RR: Go Euna
- MR: Ko Ŭna

Go Eun-ah (Korean: 고은아; born Bang Hyo-jin on October 28, 1988) is a South Korean actress. She is best known as Keum-shil in the TV series Golden Apple.

Her brother Mir is a member of the boyband MBLAQ.

== Filmography ==
=== Film ===
Year	Title	Role	Notes	Ref.
2003	...ing		Bit part	
2006	Ssunday Seoul			
2006	A Cruel Attendance	Tae-hee		
2007	The Houseguest of My Mother	Ok-hee	Daughter of Hye-ju	
2008	Loner	Jeong Soo-na		
2009	A Million	Lee Bo-young		
2014	Sketch			
2017	Beastie Girls	Seo-hyeon		

=== Television series ===
Year	Title	Role	Notes	Ref.
2005	Golden Apple	Keum-shil		
2005	Drama City: "Summer Goodbye"			
2006	Rainbow Romance	Go Eun-ah		
2006	Vacation	Soo-yeon	Cameo (Episode 1)	
2012	The Strongest K-Pop Survival	Ji Seung-yeon		
2021	I Want to Live Roughly	Ori	Sitcom	

=== Television shows ===
Year	Title	Role	Notes	Ref.
2021	My Little Old Boy	Special cast	Episode 240–present	
2021	Legend Music Class – Lalaland	Cast member		
2021	Love Master 2	Main cast		
2021	Style Me	Host		
2022–present	I'm't going to miss you	Cast Member		
2022	Queen of Ssireum	Participant		

== Awards and nominations ==
Name of the award ceremony, year presented, category, nominee of the award, and the result of the nomination
Award ceremony	Year	Category	Nominee / Work	Result	Ref.
MBC Entertainment Awards	2020	Rookie Award in Variety Category – Female	Omniscient Interfering View	Won	
