= A Bloody Aria =

2006 film by Won Sin-yeon

- Theatrical poster
- Hangul: 구타 유발자들
- Hanja: 毆打 誘發者들
- RR: Guta yubaljadeul
- MR: Kut'a yubaljadŭl
- Directed by: Won Shin-yun
- Written by: Won Shin-yun
- Produced by: Lee Seo-yeol
- Starring: Han Suk-kyu; Lee Moon-sik; Oh Dal-su; Lee Byung-joon; Cha Ye-ryun
- Cinematography: Kim Dong-eun; Kim Byung-jung
- Edited by: Choi Jae-geun; Eom Jin-hwa
- Music by: Kim Joon-sung
- Production company: Korea Entertainment
- Distributed by: Prime Entertainment
- Release date: 31 May 2006
- Running time: 115 minutes
- Country: South Korea
- Language: Korean
- Box office: US$584,409

A Bloody Aria (Korean: 구타 유발자들; RR: Guta yubaljadeul) is a 2006 South Korean black comedy film written and directed by Won Shin-Yeon, that starred Han Suk-Kyu, Lee Moon-Sik, Oh Dal-Soo, Lee Byung-Joon and Cha Ye-Ryun. The Los Angeles Times described the movie as a "thriller about a fated convergence of people from different strata of Korean society who queasily slide between roles of tormentor and victim."

== Plot ==
An aspiring opera singer In-jeong travels to countryside with her college professor Yeong-seon. She wants to learn more about the outcome of her audition for a part in an upcoming opera performance. The two park on a deserted riverbank to make a campfire. Instead of talking about the audition, Yeong-seon tries to rape In-jeong who escapes to a forest. Yeong-seon wants to leave but his car gets stuck. Three local thugs with motorcycles discover the car and confront him. Meanwhile, In-jeong stops a man on a scooter who promises to take her to a public transport terminal after they meet his friends who are waiting at the river. As it turns out, he is the leader of the group and takes In-jeong back to the riverbank where she reunites with the scared Yeong-seon but the two do not admit knowing each other. The thugs eat roasted pork and have a small talk with the professor when a young student Hyeon-jae rolls out from a bag that was placed on one of the motorcycles. The thug leader starts harassing the boy. His behavior becomes more psychotic when In-jeong voices her disapproval. He orders the thugs to rape her and forces the student and Yeong-seon to fight until one of them drops. Hyeon-jae knows taekwondo and easily defeats Yeong-seon. He then proceeds to beat the thugs. With all of them unconscious, the boy digs a hole in the ground, buries the men up to their chests and pours gasoline on their heads preparing to set them on fire. Yeong-seon runs for help and In-jeong tries to stop the student. While she's talking to him, the leader regains consciousness and manages to hit the boy with a shovel and escape from the hole. After waking up, one of the thugs beats the injured boy so badly that all believe him dead.

Meanwhile, Yeong-seon finds a police officer that fined him earlier that day and tells him about the thugs and the boy. The policeman happens to be the boy's older brother Moon-jae. When they arrive to the riverbank, they don't find anybody because the thugs locked the boy in the car's trunk and left to drive the car into the river at a different place. The boy eventually regains consciousness and shoots several times from a revolver he'd been hiding all the time. The car crashes and the policeman is able to find them. He recognizes the thug leader to be his former schoolmate Bong-yeon that he used to bully and physically abuse. The kidnapping and torture of his brother was meant to be a revenge for this abuse. The policeman proceeds with mocking and beating Bong-yeon in a manner that resembles his behavior at school. After beating him up, he leaves taking a small tin box from one of the thugs. The box originally contained cough powder but one of the thugs replaced it with a poison he used for catching birds. Believing it to be cocaine, the policeman samples the poison and dies shortly after becoming the only victim of the whole episode.

== Cast ==
- Han Suk-kyu as Moon-jae, a policeman
- Lee Moon-sik as Bong-yeon, a gang boss
- Oh Dal-su as Oh-geun, a gangster
- Cha Ye-ryun as In-jung, a student of Young-Sun
- Kim Si-hoo as Hyun-jae, a victim
- Lee Byung-joon as Young-sun, a professor of classical vocal music
- Jung Kyung-ho as Hong-bae, a gangster
- Shin Hyun-tak as Won-ryong, a gangster
- Jin Yong-ok as Tow truck driver

== Release ==
A Bloody Aria was released in South Korea on 31 May 2006, and on its opening weekend was ranked eighth at the box office with 50,047 admissions. The film went on to receive a total of 164,606 admissions nationwide, and as of 4 June 2006 had grossed a total of US$584,409.

== Home media ==
A Bloody Aria was released on DVD by HB Entertainment in South Korea, and ImaginAsian Home Entertainment in the United States. In the United Kingdom, three seconds were removed from its release to obtain the "age 18" rating.
