= Just an Ordinary Love Story =

- Promotional poster
- Genre: Drama; romance
- Written by: Lee Hyun-joo
- Directed by: Kim Jin-won
- Starring: Yoo Da-in; Yeon Woo-jin
- Country of origin: South Korea
- Original language: Korean
- No. of episodes: 4

Original release
- Network: KBS2
- Release: February 29 – March 8, 2012

Related
- Drama Special Series

Just an Ordinary Love Story (Korean: 보통의 연애; RR: Botongui yeonae; lit. Ordinary Love) is a 2012 South Korean four-episode television series starring Yoo Da-in and Yeon Woo-jin. It aired from 29 February to 8 March 2012 on Wednesdays and Thursdays at 21:55 as part of Drama Special Series, a weekly program on KBS2 showing multiple episodes short dramas, with each story having a different cast, director, and writer.

== Synopsis ==
Han Jae-kwang (Yeon Woo-jin) returns to Jeonju where his older brother was murdered seven years ago. On the pretext of a job assignment, he approaches Kim Yoon-hye (Yoo Da-in) for a site tour. Although he knows she is the daughter of the murderer who killed his brother, he can not hate her. Jae-kwang felt her pain when Yoon-hye first realized her father was the murderer. Now, 7 years later, he sees that she still carries the same pain with her. Yoon-hye believes her father is not the murderer, while Jae-kwang thinks someone else could have killed his brother. Together, they investigate the case and become close to each other. Will they find the real culprit? Will the barrier between them be removed?

== Cast ==
- Yoo Da-in as Kim Yoon-hye
  - Moon Ga-young as young Yoon-hye
- Yeon Woo-jin as Han Jae-kwang
  - Cho Yoon-woo as young Jae-kwang
- Kim Mi-kyung as Mrs. Shin
- Lee Joo-sil as Yoon-hye's paternal grandmother
- Lee Sung-min as Kim Joo-pyeong
- Choi Min as Kwon Dae-woong
- Shin Dong-mi as Kyeong-ja, Kang Mok-soo's ex-wife
- Kim Young-jae as Kang Mok-soo
- Kwon Yul as Han Jae-min

== Awards and nominations ==
Year	Award	Category	Recipient	Result
2012	KBS Drama Awards	Excellence Award, Actor in a One-Act/Special/Short Drama	Yeon Woo-jin	Won
2012	KBS Drama Awards	Excellence Award, Actress in a One-Act/Special/Short Drama	Yoo Da-in	Won
