= Won Shin-yun =

South Korean film director (born 1969)

- Born: October 23, 1969 (age 57); South Korea
- Occupation: Film director

Korean name
- Hangul: 원신연
- RR: Won Sinyeon
- MR: Wŏn Sinyŏn

Won Shin-yun (Korean: 원신연; born October 1969) is a South Korean film director. Won has the unique background of having been a stuntman before making his directorial horror film debut The Wig (2005). He filmed a series of thrillers, including A Bloody Aria (2006), Seven Days (2007), The Suspect (2013) and Memoir of a Murderer (2017). The Suspect was a box office hit with over 4.1 million admissions.

== Filmography ==
=== As director ===
==== Feature films ====
Year	Title	Credited as			Ref.
Year	Title	Director	Writer	Producer	Ref.
2005	The Wig	Yes	Yes	No	
2006	A Bloody Aria	Yes	Yes	No	
2007	Seven Days	Yes	No	No	
2013	The Suspect	Yes	No	No	
2017	Memoir of a Murderer	Yes	Yes	Yes	
2019	The Battle: Roar to Victory	Yes	No	No	
TBA	Seeking the King	Yes	Yes	No	
TBA	The Fifth Column	Yes	No	No	

==== Short films ====
Year	Title	Credited as	
Year	Title	Director	Writer
2002	A Cradle Song	Yes	Yes
2003	Bread and Milk	Yes	Yes

=== Other ===
- Piano Man (1996) - stunt/martial art department
- No. 3 (1997) - stunt/martial art department
- Deep Blue (1997) - stunt/martial art department
- Whispering Corridors (1998) - stunt/martial art department
- Calla (1999) - stunt/martial art department
- Robot Taekwon V - Live (2008, aborted due to financing) - director

== Awards and nominations ==
Awards and nominations
Years	Award	Category	Recipient(s)	Result	Ref(s)
2007	45th Grand Bell Awards	Best Film	Seven Days	Nominated	
2007	45th Grand Bell Awards	Best Director	Seven Days	Nominated	
2007	29th Blue Dragon Film Awards	Best Film	Seven Days	Nominated	
2007	29th Blue Dragon Film Awards	Best Director	Seven Days	Nominated	
2019	27th Korean Culture and Entertainment Awards	Grand Prize in a Film	The Battle: Roar to Victory	Won	
2019	27th Korean Culture and Entertainment Awards	Best Director in a Film	The Battle: Roar to Victory	Won	
2020	25th Chunsa Film Art Awards	Best Director	The Battle: Roar to Victory	Won	
