= Lee Byung-joon =

South Korean actor

- Born: January 27, 1964 (age 62); Busan, South Korea
- Other name: Lee Byeong-jun
- Education: Dongguk University – Master's degree in Culture and Arts; Dankook University – Ph.D. in Korean Language and Literature
- Occupation: Actor
- Years active: 1985–present
- Agent: Wave On Entertainment

Korean name
- Hangul: 이병준
- Hanja: 李炳俊
- RR: I Byeongjun
- MR: I Pyŏngjun

Lee Byung-joon (Korean: 이병준; born January 27, 1964) is a South Korean actor. Active in film, television and theater since 1985, Lee is best known for his supporting roles in A Bloody Aria (2006), Highway Star (2007), and Eye for an Eye (2008). On TV, he appeared in the sitcoms Kokkiri (Elephant) (2008), Oh My God (2011) and Salamander Guru and The Shadows (2012), as well as the dramas Secret Garden (2010) and Dream High (2011).

== Filmography ==
=== Film ===
- The Eternal Empire (1995)
- Sunset Into the Neon Lights (1995)
- Mugoonghwa - Korean National Flower (1995)
- Sympathy for Lady Vengeance (2005) as Dong-hwa
- A Bloody Aria (2006)
- Dasepo Naughty Girls (2006)
- Good Night (short film, 2007)
- Highway Star (2007)
- Eye for an Eye (2008)
- City of Fathers (2009) (cameo)
- Le Grand Chef 2: Kimchi Battle (2010)
- Man of Vendetta (2010)
- Earth Rep Rolling Stars (animated, 2011)
- Perfect Game (2011) (cameo)
- Never Ending Story (2012)
- Love Fiction (2012)
- Mr. XXX-Kisser (2012)
- A Millionaire on the Run (2012) (cameo)
- Ghost Sweepers (2012) (cameo)
- Born to Sing (2013) (cameo)
- Mr. Perfect (2014)
- My Dictator (2014)
- Collective Invention (2015)
- You Call It Passion (2015)

=== Television series ===
Year	Title	Role
2001	Dancing Girl Wawa	
2002	Rustic Period	
2003	Jewel in the Palace	
2004	When a Man Loves	
2005	Fashion 70s	
2006	Korea Secret Agency	
2006	Hyena	
2007	Mackerel Run	Ma Do-shik
2007	Merry Mary	
2007	War of Money	Kim Min-goo
2007	Get Karl! Oh Soo-jung	
2008	Kokkiri (Elephant)	Joo Bok-man
2008	Don't Ask Me About the Past	Director Jang
2009	The Slingshot	Do Man-hee
2009	Cinderella Man	Elegance Choi
2009	Hot Blood	
2009	Tamra, the Island	King Injo
2010	Master of Study	Anthony Yang
2010	Golden House	Con artist
2010	Secret Agent Miss Oh	Joo Soo-young
2010	Secret Garden	Park Bong-ho
2011	Dream High	Shi Bum-soo
2011	Oh My God	Himself
2011	Birdie Buddy	Sung Kyung-hwan
2011	Spy Myung-wol	Yoo Jung-shik
2011	Poseidon	Police Chief Koo
2011	Me Too, Flower!	Team Leader Kim
2011	Saving Mrs. Go Bong-shil	Cameo
2012	Oh My God 2	Himself
2012	Salamander Guru and The Shadows	Bum-gyu
2012	Goodbye Dear Wife	Priest Kong
2012	Bridal Mask	Shin Nan-da
2012	Faith	Jo Il-shin
2012	The Innocent Man	Director Choi
2012	Jeon Woo-chi	Ascetic Woon-bo
2013	Incarnation of Money	Jo Sang-deuk
2013	I Can Hear Your Voice	
2013	Wang's Family	Choi Dae-se
2013	Your Neighbor's Wife	Vice President
2013	KBS Drama Special – "Came to Me and Became a Star"	Director Oh Byung-joon
2014	Cunning Single Lady	Director Oh Byung-joon
2014	A New Leaf	
2014	KBS Drama Special – "Suspicious Ward No. 7"	Captain Lee
2014	Naeil's Cantabile	Do Kang-jae
2014	The King's Face	Kim Gong-ryang
2014	You Are The Only One	Park Jeon-ho
2015	A Daughter Just Like You	Baek Min-seok
2015	She Was Pretty	Min Yong-gil
2016	Another Miss Oh	Lee Byung-joon
2016	You Are a Gift	Kang Poong-ho
2016	Our Gap-soon	Geum Do-geum
2017	Hwarang: The Poet Warrior Youth	Park Ho
2017	Introverted Boss	
2017	My Father Is Strange	Park Hong-ik
2017	The Boy Next Door	Landlord
2017	Andante	Tae Min
2017	Go Back	Ma Pan-seok
2017	Love Returns	Jung Geun-seop
2017	I'm Not a Robot	Ye Sung-tae
2018	The Undateables	Soo-ji's father
2018	What's Wrong with Secretary Kim	Jang Jeong-do
2018	Feel Good to Die	Na Cheol-soo
2019	Level Up	Yun-hwa's father
2019	I Wanna Hear Your Song	Song Jae-hwan
2020	Hi Bye, Mama!	Baek Sam-dong
2020	Backstreet Rookie	Choi Yong-pil
2020	18 Again	Hong Joo-man
2021	Revolutionary Sisters	Han Dol-se
2022	The Glory	Lee Gil-sung
2023	The Glory 2	Lee Gil-sung
2024	Snow White's Revenge	Min Tae-chang

=== Variety show ===
- Good Sunday - Diet Survival BIGsTORY (SBS, 2011)

== Theater ==
- Dreams of a Clown
- Hanne
- Fiddler on the Roof
- Porgy and Bess
- Blood Brothers
- The Tale of Chunhyang
- Urinetown
- Chicago
- A Midsummer Night's Dream
- Oedipus the King
- I Do! I Do! (2007)
- Mine
- New Scissors Family
- 200 Pounds Beauty (2011)

== Teaching profession ==
- Paekche Institute of the Arts: Adjunct professor
- Sookmyung Women's University: Lecturer
- Dankook University: Adjunct professor, School of Performing Arts
- Korea Broadcasting Art School: Full-time faculty, Department of Broadcasting Entertainment and Acting
