= Yeon Woo-jin =

South Korean actor (born 1984)

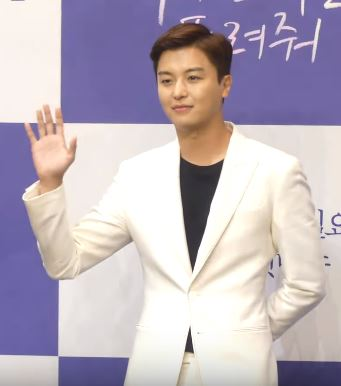
- Yeon in August 2019
- Born: Kim Bong-hwe; July 5, 1984 (age 42); Gangneung, Gangwon Province, South Korea
- Other name: Seo Ji-hoo
- Education: Sejong University (Civil & Environmental Engineering)
- Occupation: Actor
- Years active: 2009–present
- Agent: Jump
- Height: 185 cm (6 ft 1 in)

Korean name
- Hangul: 김봉회
- RR: Gim Bonghoe
- MR: Kim Ponghoe

Stage name
- Hangul: 연우진
- RR: Yeon Ujin
- MR: Yŏn Ujin
- Website: jumpent.co.kr

Kim Bong-hwe (Korean: 김봉회; born July 5, 1984), known professionally as Yeon Woo-jin (Korean: 연우진), is a South Korean actor. He started in the entertainment industry as a model and gained recognition as an actor with his role in Arang and the Magistrate (2012) which earned him a nomination for Best New Actor. He expands his acting repertoire on leading roles in Marriage, Not Dating (2014), Divorce Lawyer in Love (2015), Introverted Boss (2017), Queen for Seven Days (2017) and Judge vs. Judge (2017).

== Career ==
=== 2007–2013: Beginnings ===
Kim began his career as a fashion model at the 2007 Seoul Fashion Week and for jeans brand Evisu in 2008. He made his acting debut in the queer coming-of-age film Just Friends? in 2009 under the stage name Seo Ji-hoo. His management agency later changed his stage name to Yeon Woo-jin.

After playing a teacher in 2010 daily drama All My Love, he started to gain recognition as the youngest brother in hit 2011 family drama Ojakgyo Family. Then in his first lead role, Yeon's character falls in love with the daughter of his brother's murderer in the 4-episode Drama Special Just an Ordinary Love Story.

In 2012, he was cast as a mysterious villain in the period fantasy-romance Arang and the Magistrate. Yeon reunited with Arang director Kim Sang-ho in 2013, to again play the protagonist's rival in the gangster melodrama When a Man Falls in Love.

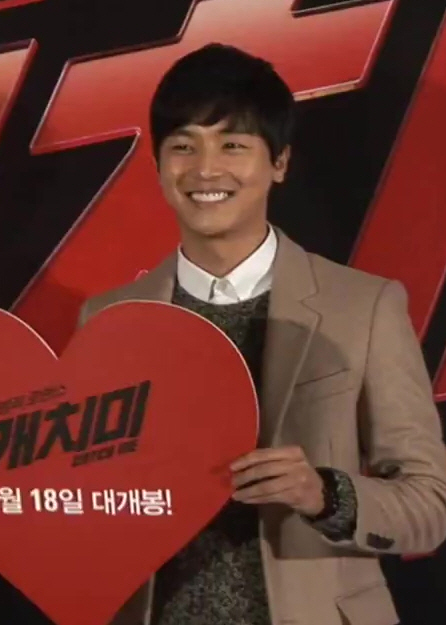
Yeon in December 2013

=== 2014–present: Leading roles and rising popularity ===
This was followed by leading roles in two romantic comedy series: as a commitment-phobic plastic surgeon in Marriage, Not Dating (2014) and as a vengeful office manager-turned-attorney in Divorce Lawyer in Love (2015).

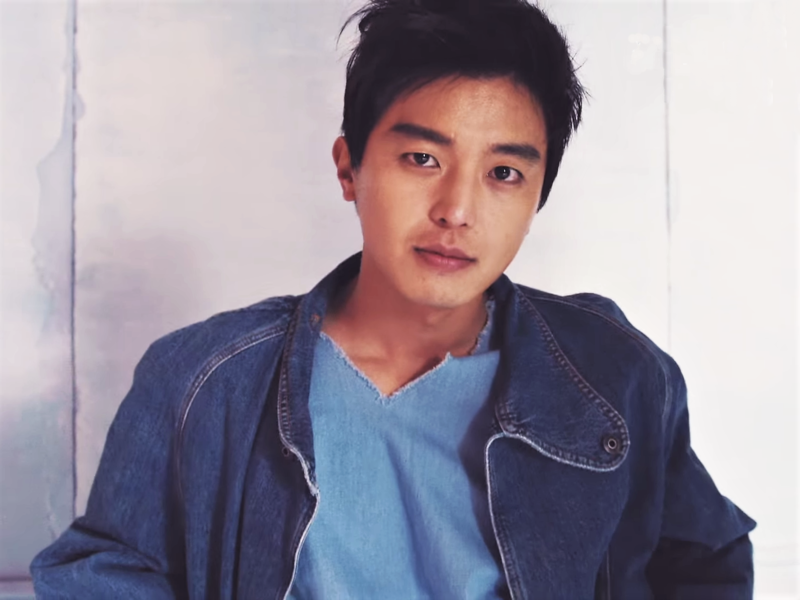
Yeon for Marie Claire Korea in July 2017

In 2017, he starred in the tvN romance comedy drama Introverted Boss. He then starred in historical melodrama Queen for Seven Days as well as legal drama Judge vs. Judge.

In 2018, Yeon starred in the medical exorcism drama Priest.

In 2019, Yeon was cast in the music romance drama I Wanna Hear Your Song.

In 2022, Yeon appeared in romantic drama film, Serve the People written and directed by Jang Cheol-soo opposite Ji An. The film based on the eponymous novel by Yan Lianke, drew wide attention and Yeon was praised for his performance as a model soldier. Later in March 2022, Yeon confirmed that on the 10th of Yeon Woo-jin's official Japanese website, an announcement was posted under the heading "About the schedule of the 2022 visit to Japan event". He held fan meetings in Tokyo on August 11 and Osaka on August 13.

== Filmography ==
=== Film ===
Year	Title	Role	Notes	Ref.
2009	Just Friends?	Kang Min-soo	Short film	
2011	We Fly High	Seung-gi	Short film	
2014	Tunnel 3D	Dong-joon		
2015	Revivre	Kim Min-soo		
2016	Seondal: The Man Who Sells the River	King Hyojong		
2017	The Table	Un-chul		
2018	Unfinished	Choi Moo-hyuk		
2018	The Princess and the Matchmaker	Yoon Si-kyung		
2018	Mongolian Love Story	Huyga	Short film	
2019	Shades of the Heart	Chang-seok		
2022	Special Delivery	Du-silk		
2022	Serve the People	Mu Kwang		

=== Television / Web series ===
Year	Title	Role	Notes	Ref.
2010	Cinderella's Stepsister	Dong-soo		
2010–2011	All My Love For You	Bang Woo-jin		
2011–2012	Ojakgyo Family	Hwang Tae-pil		
2012	Just an Ordinary Love Story	Han Jae-gwang	Drama Special Series	
2012	Arang and the Magistrate	Choi Joo-wal		
2013	When a Man Falls in Love	Lee Jae-hee		
2013–2014	My Love from the Star	Lee Han-kyung	Special appearance (Episode 18)	
2014	Secret Love	Jang Hyun-jin	Cameo (Episode 1–2)	
2014	Marriage, Not Dating	Gong Gi-tae		
2015	Divorce Lawyer in Love	So Jung-woo		
2016	Another Miss Oh	Gong Gi-tae	Special appearance (Episode 7)	
2017	Introverted Boss	Eun Hwan-gi		
2017	Queen for Seven Days	Lee Yeok		
2017–2018	Judge vs. Judge	Sa Eui-hyeon		
2018–2019	Priest	Oh Soo-min		
2019	I Wanna Hear Your Song	Jang Yoon		
2020	Search	Jo Min-gook		
2021	Undercover	Young Han Jeong-hyeon / Lee Suk-kyu	Special appearance	
2022	Thirty-Nine	Kim Seon-woo		
2023	Daily Dose of Sunshine	Dong Go-yun	Netflix drama	
2024	Nothing Uncovered	Kim Tae-hyeon		
2024	A Virtuous Business	Kim Do-hyun		

=== Hosting ===
Year	Title	Notes	Ref.
2021	Gangneung International Film Festival	Opening ceremony	

== Awards and nominations ==
Name of the award ceremony, year presented, category, nominee of the award, and the result of the nomination
Award ceremony	Year	Category	Nominee / Work	Result	Ref.
KBS Drama Awards	2012	Best Actor in a One-Act/Short Drama	Just an Ordinary Love Story	Won	
KBS Drama Awards	2019	Best Couple Award	Yeon Woo-jin (with Kim Se-jeong); I Wanna Hear Your Song	Nominated	
Korea Drama Awards	2013	Excellence Award, Actor	When a Man Falls in Love	Nominated	
MBC Drama Awards	2012	Best New Actor	Arang and the Magistrate	Nominated	
SBS Drama Awards	2015	Excellence Award, Actor in a Miniseries	Divorce Lawyer in Love	Nominated	
SBS Drama Awards	2017	Top Excellence Award, Actor in a Wednesday–Thursday Drama	Judge vs. Judge	Nominated	
SBS Drama Awards	2017	Best Couple Award	Yeon Woo-jin (with Park Eun-bin); Judge vs. Judge	Nominated	
Soompi Awards	2018	Actor of the Year	Queen for Seven Days	Nominated	
Soompi Awards	2018	Best Kiss Award	Yeoo Woo-jin (with Park Min-young); Queen for Seven Days	Nominated	
Soompi Awards	2018	Best Kiss Award	Yeon Woo-jin (with Park Hye-su); Introverted Boss	Nominated	
tvN10 Awards	2016	Best Kiss Award	Yeon Woo-jin (with Han Groo); Marriage, Not Dating	Nominated	
