= The Wig =

2005 South Korean film by Won Shin-yun

- Theatrical poster
- Hangul: 가발
- Hanja: 假髮
- RR: Gabal
- MR: Kabal
- Directed by: Won Shin-yun
- Written by: Do Hyun-jung; Won Shin-yun
- Produced by: Kim Yong-dae; Lee Seo-yeol
- Starring: Chae Min-seo; Yoo Sun; Sa Hyeon-jin
- Cinematography: Kim Dong-eun
- Edited by: Kim Sun-min
- Music by: Kim Jun-seong
- Production company: Korea Entertainment
- Distributed by: CJ Entertainment
- Release date: August 12, 2005
- Running time: 106 minutes
- Country: South Korea
- Language: Korean
- Box office: US$2,146,621

The Wig (Korean: 가발; RR: Gabal) is 2005 South Korean horror film directed by Won Shin-yun, and starring Chae Min-seo and Yoo Sun. It was first released on August 12, 2005, in South Korea and was released onto DVD in the United States in 2008.

== Plot ==
A young woman named Soo-hyeon (Chae Min-seo) is battling cancer and her older sister Ji-hyeon (Yoo Sun) decides that she should take her home so that she can enjoy what little time she has left rather than spend it in a hospital. Ji-hyeon is mute, because of a car accident that impaled her throat. She buys a long-haired wig for her sister so that she can go out without feeling ashamed of being bald; Soo-hyeon is very happy with the gift and wears it constantly: she begins to look and act healthier and more attractive, and leaves the house often.

Soon, however, Soo-hyeon begins to become a vainer girl who becomes obsessed with the wig and begins to try and steal Ji-hyeon's boyfriend. He breaks up with Ji-hyeon but is not interested in Soo-hyeon. One day, one of Ji-hyeon's friends finds out that her husband is cheating on her. Soo-hyeon lends her the wig, saying that she will feel prettier and better. The next day, however, the friend is found dead with her husband, covered in hair. Soo-hyeon's wig has been returned to her, mysteriously. She cruelly ignores Ji-hyeon at every attempt at conversation and is plagued with frightening images of the friend's demise. The next day, she tries to have sex with Ji-hyeon's ex, but Ji-hyeon picks her up and the two drive home. Soo-hyeon goads her, angering Ji-hyeon.

At home, the two do not speak until Soo-hyeon washes the wig and Ji-hyeon sees a ghost in it, revealing that the wig is cursed and is corrupting and possessing Soo-hyeon. Ji-hyeon grabs the wig and locks Soo-hyeon in her room, then cuts the wig to shreds. The cancer comes back stronger than ever and Soo-hyeon has to go back to the hospital, unhappy and refusing to see her sister. She escapes the hospital after not taking her medication. We then see a disturbing scene of Soo-hyeon pulling pills from her bloody scalp.

It is revealed that the wig belonged to a man who was in a romantic relationship with Ji-hyeon's ex. Being gay, he was shunned by Ji-hyeon's ex and beaten by a group of teens, cutting his long hair. He then committed suicide. The ghost of the man is the one who is corrupting and possessing Soo-hyeon, who tracks down Ji-hyeon's ex, and the two then reconcile. As they kiss, Soo-hyeon's hair grows at an impossibly fast rate. Ji-hyeon appears and sets fire to the long hair, freeing her sister and destroying the ghost. Unfortunately, she hallucinates that the ghost is in the same place as her sister and beats her to death. As Soo-hyeon dies, her sister realizes it was a hallucination and cries at what she has done. The film ends with a photograph of the two girls as children, before Soo-hyeon's cancer and Ji-hyeon's speech loss.

== Cast ==
- Chae Min-seo as Soo-hyeon / Hee-jo
  - Kim Kyeong-in as young Soo-hyeon
- Yoo Sun as Ji-hyeon
  - Jeon Ha-eun as young Ji-hyeon
- Bang Moon-soo as Ki-seok
- Sa Hyeon-jin as Kyeong-joo
- Soy Kim as Hye-yeong
- Shin Hyeong-jong as father of Hye-yeong
- Seo Joo-seong as husband of Kyeong-joo
- Na Hyeon-joo as Min-joo
- Ryoo Hyeon-min as Tae-joon
- Kim Joo-kyeong as Ki-hoon

== Reception ==
Critical reception for The Wig has been mixed. DVD Talk and Shock Till You Drop were both relatively ambivalent in their reviews, as both felt that the movie was not the best that Asian horror had to offer but still had some viewing value to it that people would enjoy. Bloody Disgusting echoed these sentiments, as they felt that the movie "requires a lot of commitment on the part of the viewer" but that the payoff was "worth it, because as strange as it is, you might not have seen anything quite like it before."

== Trivia ==
Chae Min-seo shaved her head for the movie.
