= One Warm Word =

- Promotional poster
- Also known as: A Word from Warm Heart; A Single Warm Word; One Sweet Word; Kind Words; Good Word
- Genre: Romance; Melodrama
- Written by: Ha Myung-hee
- Directed by: Choi Young-hoon
- Starring: Han Hye-jin; Ji Jin-hee; Kim Ji-soo; Lee Sang-woo
- Country of origin: South Korea
- Original language: Korean
- No. of episodes: 20

Production
- Executive producer: Han Jung-hwan
- Production location: South Korea
- Running time: 65 minutes Mondays and Tuesdays at 21:55 (KST)
- Production company: HB Entertainment

Original release
- Network: SBS
- Release: 2 December 2013 – 24 February 2014

One Warm Word (Korean: 따뜻한 말 한마디; RR: Ttatteuthan mal hanmadi) is a 2013 South Korean television series starring Han Hye-jin, Ji Jin-hee, Kim Ji-soo, and Lee Sang-woo. It aired on SBS from 2 December 2013 to 24 February 2014 on Mondays and Tuesdays at 21:55 for 20 episodes.

== Plot ==
The drama explores the reality and complexities of married life. Eun-jin and Jae-hak, who are married to other people, find themselves attracted to each other. Their marriages become in danger of unraveling, as their affair disrupts the lives of family and friends around them.

== Cast ==
=== Main characters ===
- Han Hye-jin as Na Eun-jin
- Ji Jin-hee as Yoo Jae-hak
- Kim Ji-soo as Song Mi-kyung
- Lee Sang-woo as Kim Sung-soo

=== Supporting characters ===
Eun-jin and Sung-soo's family

- Yoon Joo-sang as Na Dae-ho, Eun-jin's father
- Go Doo-shim as Kim Na-ra, Eun-jin's mother
- Yoon Jong-hwa as Na Jin-chul, Eun-jin's younger brother
- Yoon Joo-hee as Yoon Sun-ah, Jin-chul's wife
- Han Groo as Na Eun-young, Eun-jin's younger sister
- Lee Chae-mi as Kim Yoon-jung, Sung-soo and Eun-jin's daughter
- Yang Ohn-yoo as Na Hoon, Jin-chul and Sun-ah's son

Jae-hak and Mi-kyung's family

- Park Jung-soo as Mrs. Choo, Jae-hak's mother
- Park Seo-joon as Song Min-soo, Mi-kyung's half brother
- Kim Dae-sung as Yoo Hye-hwang, Jae-hak and Mi-kyung's eldest son
- Jeon Jin-seo as Yoo Hye-joon, Jae-hak and Mi-kyung's second son

Extended cast

- Choi Hwa-jung as Choi Anna, cooking class instructor
- Son Hwa-ryung as Ji-hye, cooking class student/Eun-jin's friend
- Kim Hye-na as Young-kyung, cooking class student/Eun-jin's senior

== Ratings ==
In the table below, the blue numbers represent the lowest ratings and the red numbers represent the highest ratings.

Episode #	Original broadcast date	Average audience share			
Episode #	Original broadcast date	TNmS Ratings		AGB Nielsen	
Episode #	Original broadcast date	Nationwide	Seoul National Capital Area	Nationwide	Seoul National Capital Area
1	2 December 2013	6.8%	7.1%	6.8%	7.5%
2	3 December 2013	7.3%	9.1%	8.4%	8.8%
3	9 December 2013	5.6%	5.8%	6.8%	7.5%
4	10 December 2013	6.7%	8.2%	8.3%	9.5%
5	16 December 2013	5.2%	6.1%	6.8%	7.4%
6	17 December 2013	6.9%	7.4%	8.5%	9.3%
7	23 December 2013	6.5%	7.1%	8.5%	9.7%
8	24 December 2013	6.7%	6.9%	9.1%	10.0%
9	6 January 2014	7.0%	7.1%	8.6%	9.3%
10	7 January 2014	7.7%	8.3%	10.5%	11.8%
11	13 January 2014	7.0%	8.0%	9.9%	11.4%
12	14 January 2014	8.3%	9.8%	10.2%	10.9%
13	20 January 2014	8.1%	9.5%	10.8%	12.3%
14	21 January 2014	8.2%	9.6%	11.3%	12.2%
15	27 January 2014	7.5%	7.7%	9.7%	10.0%
16	28 January 2014	7.9%	8.1%	10.5%	10.4%
17	3 February 2014	7.4%	7.8%	9.9%	10.1%
18	4 February 2014	9.3%	10.4%	10.9%	11.4%
19	17 February 2014	7.7%	8.3%	9.9%	11.3%
20	24 February 2014	6.6%	7.1%	8.7%	9.7%
Average (Ep1-20)		7.2%	8.0%	9.2%	10.0%
Special	25 February 2014	5.0%	6.6%	5.7%	6.1%
Average (Ep1-20+S)		7.1%	7.9%	9.0%	9.8%

== Awards and nominations ==
Year	Award	Category	Recipient	Result
2014	50th Baeksang Arts Awards	Most Popular Actress (TV)	Kim Ji-soo	Nominated
2014	50th Baeksang Arts Awards	Best Screenplay (TV)	Ha Myung-hee	Nominated
2014	50th Baeksang Arts Awards	Best New Actor (TV)	Park Seo-joon	Nominated
2014	50th Baeksang Arts Awards	Best New Actress (TV)	Han Groo	Nominated
2014	50th Baeksang Arts Awards	Best Actress (TV)	Kim Ji-soo	Nominated
2014	SBS Drama Awards	Top Excellence Award, Actress in a Drama Special	Han Hye-jin	Nominated
2014	SBS Drama Awards	Top Excellence Award, Actress in a Drama Special	Kim Ji-soo	Nominated
2014	SBS Drama Awards	Excellence Award, Actor in a Drama Special	Ji Jin-hee	Nominated
2014	SBS Drama Awards	Special Award, Actress in a Drama Special	Go Doo-shim	Won
2014	SBS Drama Awards	New Star Award	Han Groo	Won
2014	SBS Drama Awards	New Star Award	Park Seo-joon	Won
2014	SBS Drama Awards	Best Couple Award	Park Seo-joon and Han Groo	Nominated
