= Divorce Lawyer in Love =

2015 South Korean television series

- Promotional poster
- Genre: Romance; Comedy
- Created by: Park Young-soo
- Written by: Kim Ah-jung
- Directed by: Park Yong-soon
- Starring: Cho Yeo-jeong; Yeon Woo-jin
- Composer: Choi Kyung-shik
- Country of origin: South Korea
- Original language: Korean
- No. of episodes: 18

Production
- Executive producers: Ahn Jae-hyun; Shin Sang-yoon; Eun Sung-hee
- Producers: Cho Eun-jung; Jang Sung-wook
- Production location: Korea
- Running time: 70 minutes
- Production companies: Samhwa Networks; JS Top Entertainment

Original release
- Network: SBS TV
- Release: April 18 – June 14, 2015

Divorce Lawyer in Love (Korean: 이혼변호사는 연애중; RR: Ihonbyeonhosaneun yeonaejung; lit. Divorce Lawyer is Dating) is a 2015 South Korean television series starring Cho Yeo-jeong and Yeon Woo-jin. It aired on SBS from April 18 to June 14, 2015, on Saturdays and Sundays at 22:00 for 18 episodes.

== Plot ==
Go Cheok-hee and So Jung-woo once worked together at a law firm; she was a well known divorce lawyer, and he was her office manager. She treated him like her inferior, while he constantly irked her by pointing out her mistakes and calling her "Chucky" behind her back. Cheok-hee is so ambitious and determined to win every case for her clients that her unethical misdeeds catch up to her, causing her license to be suspended.

Meanwhile, Jung-woo studies and gets his law degree, thanks to his friend who happens to have a crush on him. Years later, Cheok-hee and Jung-woo end up working together again, but for a different law firm. And this time the tables have turned — he's the divorce lawyer, and she's the office manager. Jung-woo relishes getting his petty revenge, until ultimately realizing that she was the one who rescued him in a tragic accident in the subway when he was a law student on his way to the legal bar examinations.

== Cast ==
- Cho Yeo-jeong as Go Cheok-hee
  - Lee Bit-na as young Cheok-hee
- Yeon Woo-jin as So Jung-woo
- Shim Hyung-tak as Bong Min-gyu
- Wang Ji-won as Jo Soo-ah
- Lee Yul-eum as Woo Yoo-mi
- Hwang Young-hee as Yoon Jung-sook
- Lee Dong-hwi as Lee Kyung
- Maeng Sang-hoon as Go Dong-sang
- Park Joon-geum as Ma Dong-mi
- Lee El as Han Mi-ri
- Cha Yub as Jo Yoo-sang
- Yang Ji-won as Yoo Hye-rin
- Kim Yul as Go Mi-hee
- Sung Byung-sook as Jang Mi-hwa
- Kim Kap-soo as Bong In-jae
- Shin Ha-yeon as Lee Ha-jung
- Son Se-bin
- Heo Jung-eun
- Ha Ji-young as Kim-ji
- Kim Young-hoon as Han Dae-man
- Jeon Soo-kyeong as Lee Yeon-hee (cameo ep. 4)

== Production ==
Divorce Lawyers in Love was originally slated to air in March 2015 as the replacement of The Family is Coming in the Saturday and Sunday 20:45 time slot. However, its premiere was postponed to April 2015 and its time slot was changed to Saturdays and Sundays at 22:00, following the cancellation of My Heart Twinkle Twinkle due to low ratings. Divorce Lawyers in Love drew an average rating of 4.5%, still low but an improvement on the 3.4% average rating of My Heart Twinkle Twinkle.

== Ratings ==
In the table below, the blue numbers represent the lowest ratings and the red numbers represent the highest ratings.

Episode #	Original Broadcast Date	Average Audience Share
Episode #	Original Broadcast Date	AGB Nielsen
Episode #	Original Broadcast Date	Nationwide
1	18 April 2015	6.0%
2	19 April 2015	5.5%
3	25 April 2015	5.8%
4	26 April 2015	5.1%
5	2 May 2015	4.8%
6	3 May 2015	4.6%
7	9 May 2015	5.2%
8	10 May 2015	4.4%
9	16 May 2015	4.0%
10	17 May 2015	4.7%
11	23 May 2015	3.4%
12	24 May 2015	4.3%
13	30 May 2015	3.7%
14	31 May 2015	4.6%
15	6 June 2015	3.7%
16	7 June 2015	3.6%
17	13 June 2015	3.4%
18	14 June 2015	4.2%
Average		4.5%
