= Lee Jung-hyuk =

South Korean actor

- Born: Lee Jung-sub; 22 April 1985 (age 41); Incheon, South Korea
- Other names: Lee Jung-seob lee jeong seob and lee jeong hyeok
- Education: Kookmin University (Department of Theater and Film)
- Occupations: Actor; model
- Years active: 2010–present
- Agent: Loen Entertainment
- Known for: Fists of Legend; I Can Hear Your Voice; On the Way to the Airport

Lee Jung-hyuk is a South Korean actor and model. He is known for his in dramas such as I Can Hear Your Voice, On the Way to the Airport and he is also known for his roles in movies such as Fists of Legend.

== Filmography ==
=== Television series ===
Year	Title	Role	Ref.
2010	Kiss and the City	Jeong-yoo	
2013	I Can Hear Your Voice	Lee Jung-hoon	
2013	Nail Shop Paris	Hyeok-woo	
2013	Marry Him If You Dare	Seong-hoon	
2013-2014	Passionate Love	Ban Tae-yang	
2015	House of Bluebird	Yoo-min	
2016	The Vampire Detective	Ji Seung-cheol	
2016	On the Way to the Airport	Park Sang-yeob	
2017	Man in the Kitchen	Manager Kim	
2017	Prison Playbook	Nexen Team GM Asst	
2018	Welcome to Waikiki	Kim Woo-sung	
2018	Suits	Kim Jin-kyu	
2018	Devilish Charm	Min Hyung-joon	
2018	The Beauty Inside	Yoon-ha	
2019	Home for Summer	Choi Seung-min	
2022	It's Beautiful Now	Jaehyun	
2023	Unpredictable Family	Yeon Je-ha	
2025	Study Group	Pi Yeon-baek	

=== Film ===
Year	Title	Role	Language	Ref.
2013	Fists of Legend	Son Jin-ho	Korean	
2017	Beastie Girls	Soo-hyuk	Korean	
2017	V.I.P.	Gwang Il's gang member	Korean	
2018	Cheese in the Trap	Student	Korean	
2021	Our Midnight	Chief Han	Korean	
2021	Tigar Mask	Myeong-gi	Korean	
2023	Miss Fortune	Art Student	Korean	
