= Jeong Da-hye =

South Korean actress (born 1985)

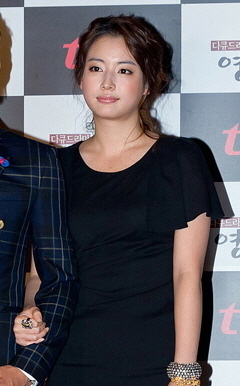
- Jeong in 2011
- Born: June 18, 1985 (age 39); South Korea
- Occupation: Actress

Korean name
- Hangul: 정다혜
- RR: Jeong Dahye
- MR: Chŏng Tahye

Jeong Da-hye (Korean: 정다혜, born June 18, 1985) is a South Korean actress. She is known for starring in various Korean films such as The Servant, The Etudes of Love and Temptation of Wolves as well as in Korean television dramas like The Lady in Dignity, and Ugly Miss Young-ae.

== Filmography ==
=== Film ===
Year	Title	Role	Ref.
2014	Ordinary Days	Jung-yeon	
2013	That Woman and That Man's Inside Story	Soo-jung	
2010	Heartbeat	Na Soo-young	
2010	The Servant		
2008	Loner	Teacher	
2004	Temptation of Wolves	Han Da-reum	
2003	Oh! Happy Day	Kong Seon-ji	

=== Television ===
Year	Title	Role	Ref.
2018	Come and Hug Me	Cheon Se-kyung	
2017	The Lady in Dignity	Oh Kyung-hee	
2010	Pasta	Park Mi-hee	
2007	Couple Breaking	Kim Hye-yeong	
2007–19	Ugly Miss Young-ae	Lee Young-chae	
2007	Two Outs in the Ninth Inning	Kim Nam-jung	
2005	The Youth in Bare Foot	Chae Bo-bae	
2005	Eighteen, Twenty-Nine	Lee Eun-ji	
2003	Go Mom Go!		
2002	Whenever the Heart Beats	Suh Min-kyung	
2001–02	Piano	Han Joo Hee	
