= Marriage, Not Dating =

2014 South Korean television series

- Promotional poster
- Also known as: Marriage Over Love; Marriage Without Love; Marriage Without Dating; Let's Get Married
- Hangul: 연애 말고 결혼
- Hanja: 戀愛 말고 結婚
- RR: Yeonae malgo gyeolhon
- MR: Yŏnae malgo kyŏrhon
- Genre: Romance; Comedy; Drama
- Written by: Joo Hwa-mi
- Directed by: Song Hyun-wook; Lee Jong-jae
- Starring: Han Groo; Yeon Woo-jin; Jeong Jin-woon; Han Sun-hwa; Heo Jung-min; Yoon So-hee
- Country of origin: South Korea
- Original languages: Korean; English
- No. of episodes: 16

Production
- Production location: Korea
- Running time: Fridays and Saturdays at 20:40 (KST)
- Production company: IOK Media

Original release
- Network: tvN
- Release: July 4 – August 23, 2014

Marriage, Not Dating (Korean: 연애 말고 결혼) is a 2014 South Korean romantic comedy drama television series starring Han Groo, Yeon Woo-jin, Jeong Jin-woon, Han Sun-hwa, Heo Jung-min, and Yoon So-hee. It aired on tvN from July 4 to August 23, 2014 on Fridays and Saturdays at 20:40 (KST) for 16 episodes.

== Synopsis ==
Wealthy plastic surgeon Gong Gi-tae has no interest in getting married; by contrast, marriage is all shop girl Joo Jang-mi dreams about. In an effort to get his parents off his back about the constant string of blind dates and marriage prospects, Gi-tae purposely brings Jang-mi home to meet his parents posing as his girlfriend, certain that they'll never approve of her. This romantic comedy portrays a man who doesn't want to get married, and a woman who has no luck with potential marriage prospects.

== Cast ==
=== Main characters ===
- Han Groo as Joo Jang-mi

A 29-year-old girl who earnestly believes in true love despite her countless failures in previous relationships. As an employee at a luxury brand shop, she is surrounded by luxury products, but has none of her own. Although her age and socio-economic class make her an unattractive bride in the "marriage market," Jang-mi still wants to find the right man to marry, because her greatest fear is being alone.

- Yeon Woo-jin as Gong Gi-tae

A 33-year-old successful plastic surgeon with an abrasive personality. Gi-tae enjoys solitude too much to settle down, much to the dismay of his parents.

- Jeong Jin-woon as Han Yeo-reum

A restaurant waiter with aspirations of becoming a chef. Though playful and sweet, Yeo-reum's painful past (his mother abandoned him as a child) makes him push away anyone who gets too close. But he finds himself falling for Jang-mi.

- Han Sun-hwa as Kang Se-ah

Like her former fiancé Gi-tae, Se-ah is a rich, single plastic surgeon, plus her father is a hospital director. After their break-up, Se-ah's convinced that women (including herself) can do without men. In order to get pregnant, she begins to blackmail Gi-tae into giving her his sperm.

- Heo Jung-min as Lee Hoon-dong

The owner of an upscale restaurant, and Gi-tae's best friend. Hoon-dong once dated Jang-mi but broke her heart and even accused her of being a stalker. But when she gets over him, he regrets his actions and begins pursuing her again.

- Yoon So-hee as Nam Hyun-hee

Jang-mi's coworker who wants to hit the jackpot by marrying a rich man. Hyun-hee develops real feelings for Hoon-dong after their one-night stand.

=== Supporting characters ===
- Kim Hae-sook as Shin Bong-hyang, Gi-tae's mother

Seemingly cold and aloof, she's obsessed with marrying off her son Gi-tae, but he constantly thwarts her schemes.

- Kim Kap-soo as Gong Soo-hwan, Gi-tae's father

A doctor who's cheating on his wife with a younger mistress.

- Im Ye-jin as Na So-nyeo, Jang-mi's mother

She and her husband run a chicken and soju restaurant, and are constantly bickering.

- Park Jun-gyu as Joo Kyung-pyo, Jang-mi's father

He and his wife are so happy and excited to have a future doctor son-in-law, that Jang-mi is unable to tell her parents the real score between her and Gi-tae.

- Park Hee-jin as Gong Mi-jung

She gets bribed by her sister-in-law Bong-hyang into tailing Gi-tae and Jang-mi, hoping to find proof that their relationship is fake.

- Kim Young-ok as Noh Geum-soon

Gi-tae's grandmother, and the only member of his family who approves of Jang-mi.

- Lee Bo-hee as Hoon-dong's mother

A wealthy widow who dotes on and spoils her only son.

- Choi Hyun as Chef Uhm

He works at Hoon-dong's restaurant where he is skimming off the profits. He is also antagonistic towards Yeo-reum.

- Lee Yeon-kyung as Soo-hwan's mistress
- Moon Ji-hoo as Sin-woo
- Park Hee-jin as Gong Mi-jung

=== Cameo/guest appearances ===
- Lee Han-wi
- Nam Ji-hyun (Note: Credited as Son Ji-hyun.) as Ki-tae's blind date (ep 1)
- Choi Dae-chul
- Heo Jun
- Ahn Hae-sook
- Kim Jung-min as Power blogger with a plastic surgery addiction (ep 13)
- Julien Kang as Richard Bernstein (ep 14)
- Ko Kyu-pil (ep 13)

== Ratings ==
In this table, the blue numbers represent the lowest ratings and the red numbers represent the highest ratings.

| Ep. | Original broadcast date | Title | Average audience share |
| Ep. | Original broadcast date | Title | AGB Nielsen |
| Ep. | Original broadcast date | Title | Nationwide |
|---|---|---|---|
| 1 | July 4, 2014 | The polite way to break up | 0.85% |
| 2 | July 5, 2014 | Widespread advantageous kindness: Maintaining your fishpond | 1.36% |
| 3 | July 11, 2014 | Being happy on your own | 1.75% |
| 4 | July 12, 2014 | For whom we cook pancakes | 1.57% |
| 5 | July 18, 2014 | Words I can only say to you | 1.90% |
| 6 | July 19, 2014 | Me, who looks alone, isn't alone, but seems alone | 1.51% |
| 7 | July 25, 2014 | It's okay even if it's not okay | 2.21% |
| 8 | July 26, 2014 | Marry me if you can | 2.13% |
| 9 | August 1, 2014 | One night in a faraway place | 2.38% |
| 10 | August 2, 2014 | The thing you should keep hidden until the very last moment | 2.00% |
| 11 | August 8, 2014 | Confession (Go back) | 2.61% |
| 12 | August 9, 2014 | Will sincerity get through? | 1.97% |
| 13 | August 15, 2014 | Don't lean and don't expect | 3.31% |
| 14 | August 16, 2014 | Sorry for not being cool / Thanks for not being cool | 2.05% |
| 15 | August 22, 2014 | Two women who love one man | 2.28% |
| 16 | August 23, 2014 | Nevertheless, marriage | 1.62% |
| Average | | | 1.97% |

- This drama airs on a cable channel/pay TV which normally has a relatively smaller audience compared to free-to-air TV/public broadcasters (KBS, SBS, MBC and EBS).

== Awards and nominations ==
| Year | Award | Category | Recipient | Result |
|---|---|---|---|---|
| 2014 | 16th Seoul International Youth Film Festival | Best Young Actor | Jeong Jin-woon | Nominated |
| 2014 | 16th Seoul International Youth Film Festival | Best Young Actress | Han Sun-hwa | Nominated |
| 2016 | tvN10 Awards | Best Kiss Award | Yeon Woo-jin and Han Groo | Nominated |
