= Lee Da-in (actress, born 1985) =

South Korean actress (born 1985)

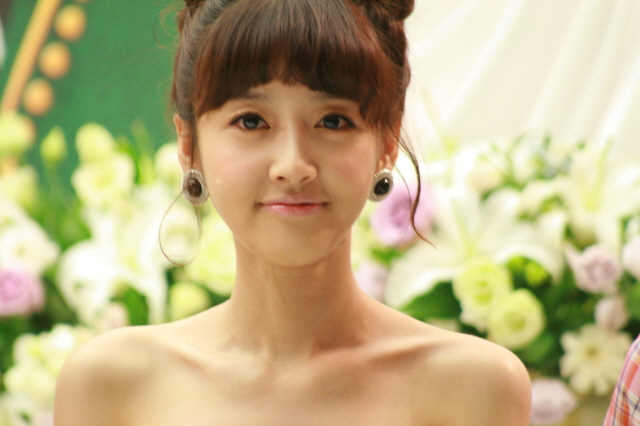
- Lee at the press conference for All About Marriage
- Born: Kim Bo-ram; March 25, 1985 (age 41); Seocho, Seoul, South Korea
- Occupation: Actress
- Years active: 2007–present
- Agent: Box Media

Korean name
- Hangul: 김보람
- RR: Gim Boram
- MR: Kim Poram

Stage name
- Hangul: 이다인
- Hanja: 李多寅
- RR: I Dain
- MR: I Tain

Lee Da-in (Korean: 이다인; born March 25, 1985), birth name Kim Bo-ram, is a South Korean actress. She made her debut in 2007 SBS television series The Person I Love.

== Filmography ==
=== Television series ===
| Year | Title | Role | Network | Ref. |
|---|---|---|---|---|
| 2007 | The Person I Love | | SBS | |
| 2008 | Worlds Within | Kim Min-hee | KBS2 | |
| 2009 | Romance Zero | Jo Mi-na | MBC; Dramanet | |
| 2009 | Jolly Widows | Cha Seung-min | KBS1 | |
| 2010 | All About Marriage | Yoo Da-hye | KBS2 | |
| 2011 | I Trusted Him | Han Kyung-mi | MBC | |
| 2012 | Drama Special Series: "Maiden Detective Park Haesol" | Lee Eun-joo | KBS2 | |
| 2012 | Suspicious Family | | MBN | |

=== Film ===
| Year | Title | Role | Ref. |
|---|---|---|---|
| 2008 | Loner | Lee Ha-jeong | |
| 2010 | Hero | Mia | |
