= The Suspect (2013 South Korean film) =

- Film poster
- Directed by: Won Shin-yun
- Written by: Im Sang-yoon
- Produced by: Yu Jeong-hun; Shin Chang-hwan
- Starring: Gong Yoo; Park Hee-soon; Jo Sung-ha; Yoo Da-in
- Cinematography: Lee Sung-jae
- Edited by: Shin Min-kyung
- Music by: Kim Jun-seong
- Production company: Greenfish
- Distributed by: Showbox; Mediaplex
- Release date: December 24, 2013
- Running time: 137 minutes
- Country: South Korea
- Language: Korean
- Budget: ~US$9.5 million
- Box office: US$26.9 million

The Suspect (Korean: 용의자; Hanja: 容疑者; RR: Yonguija) is a 2013 South Korean action spy film starring Gong Yoo, and directed by Won Shin-yun.

== Plot ==
Ji Dong-cheol was once one of the top special forces agent in North Korea, but after a change in political system, he was abandoned by his government while on a mission. He goes on the run, seeking his wife and daughter who were sold as slaves to China, only to discover their corpses. When he learns that an ex-colleague was behind their deaths, Dong-cheol goes on a vendetta for revenge, defecting to the South to chase his family's killer. Now living incognito, he searches for his nemesis during the day, and at night works as a personal chauffeur for Chairman Park, a business executive with ties to Pyongyang. One night the chairman is attacked and killed by an assassin, but not before handing over a special pair of glasses to Dong-cheol. The South Korean intelligence service, a member of which frames Dong-cheol for the murder, goes on the hunt for the beleaguered former spy. The manhunt is led by Min Se-hoon, a colonel and drill sergeant with whom Dong-cheol shares a past, and Kim Seok-ho, a corrupt director of the NIS. Aided by a feisty documentary filmmaker, Dong-cheol goes on the run again while trying to recover top-secret materials that his dying boss sent him to find.

== Cast ==
- Gong Yoo as Ji Dong-cheol, a former highly ranked North Korean spy turned defector investigating the murder of his family and accused of the murder of a business executive
- Park Hee-soon as Min Se-hoon, a South Korean NIS operative demoted to a drill sergeant after a failed mission where Ji Dong-cheol spared him
- Jo Sung-ha as Kim Seok-ho, a corrupt NIS director, the main antagonist
- Yoo Da-in as Choi Kyung-hee, filmmaker of a documentary on North Korean defectors who follows Dong-cheol around and sympathizes with his past
- Kim Sung-kyun as Ri Kwang-jo, a North Korean defector who Ji Dong-cheol believes killed his family
- Jo Jae-yoon as Captain Jo, who assists Min Se-hoon and investigates Ji Dong-cheol's innocence
- Park Ji-il as Executive director Song
- Kim Min-jae as Reporter Joo
- Kim Eui-sung as Deputy department head Shin
- Won Poong-yeon as Kim Seok-ho's underling
- Won Jin as SA1
- Song Jae-rim as Professor Kim / SA2
- Choi Jong-ryul as Butler Moon
- Nam Bo-ra as Ji Dong-cheol's wife
- Lee Na-eun as Ri Kwang-jo's wife
- Song Jae-ho as Haejoo Group chairman Park Geon-ho
- Gi Ju-bong as Coroner
- Jo Seok-hyun as Colonel Choi
- Lee Yong-jik as Bearded stranger
- Choi Tae-hwan as Mysterious casualty
- Lee Dong-jin as North wanderer
- Seo Hyun-woo

== Production ==
Yoon Kye-sang was originally cast in the lead role, but dropped out after co-star Choi Min-sik left the project.

Gong Yoo was eventually cast, and the protagonist's name "Ji Dong-cheol" is similar to the actor's birth name, Gong Ji-cheol. To create the right physique for his role, Gong went on a diet for three months to reduce his body fat. He learned the Russian martial art Systema for the film's fight scenes, and performed car chases, rock climbing and skydiving at the Han River without using stuntmen.

The film was partly shot in Puerto Rico in April 2013.

== Release ==
The Suspect opened in South Korea on December 24, 2013. It was a box office hit, with 4.1 million admissions.

The film's distribution rights was sold to seven territories, including North America, Japan, Hong Kong, Taiwan, India, the Middle East and German-speaking countries. Will Go USA screened the film in 15 theaters in the United States on January 10, 2014.

== Reception ==
On review aggregator Rotten Tomatoes, the film holds an approval rating of 75% based on eight reviews, with an average rating of 6.67/10. On Metacritic, the film has a weighted average score of 63 out of 100, based on five critics, indicating "generally favorable reviews".

The Los Angeles Times praised the film's "inspired and teeth-grittingly determined" set pieces. The Washington Post wrote that the film "should entertain any action buff," while Screen Daily, a film journal in the UK, also gave a good review: "the style of the action scenes is so explosive and immersive that the movie even threatens the reputation of the 007 series." The New York Times reviewed that the "guns-or-butter dichotomy" is "more resonant than you'd expect."

== Awards and nominations ==
Year	Award	Category	Recipient	Result
2014	19th Chunsa Film Art Awards	Best Actor	Gong Yoo	Nominated
2014	50th Baeksang Arts Awards	Best Supporting Actor	Jo Sung-ha	Nominated
2014	34th Korean Association of Film Critics Awards	Critics' Top 10	The Suspect	Won
2014	22nd Korea Culture and Entertainment Awards	Top Excellence Award, Actor in a Film	Gong Yoo	Won
