= Memoir of a Murderer =

- Theatrical release poster
- Hangul: 살인자의 기억법
- RR: Sarinjaui gieokbeop
- MR: Sarinjaŭi kiŏkpŏp
- Directed by: Won Shin-yun
- Screenplay by: Hwang Jo-yun; Won Shin-yun
- Based on: A Murderer's Guide to Memorization by Kim Young-ha
- Produced by: You Jeong-hun; Won Shin-yun
- Starring: Sul Kyung-gu; Kim Nam-gil; Kim Seol-hyun; Oh Dal-su
- Cinematography: Choi Young-hwan
- Edited by: Shin Min-kyung
- Music by: Kim Jun-seong
- Production company: Robot Communications
- Distributed by: Showbox
- Release date: 6 September 2017
- Running time: 118 minutes 128 minutes (director's cut)
- Country: South Korea
- Language: Korean
- Box office: US$19.5 million

Memoir of a Murderer (Korean: 살인자의 기억법; RR: Sarinjaui gieokbeop) is a 2017 South Korean mystery thriller film directed by Won Shin-yun. It is based on a bestselling novel by Kim Young-ha. The film stars Sul Kyung-gu and Kim Nam-gil in the lead roles, with Kim Seol-hyun and Oh Dal-su in the supporting roles. The filming began in late 2015. The film was released in South Korean theatres on 6 September 2017.

== Plot ==
After killing his abusive father, teenage Byeong-soo (Sul Kyung-gu) begins to believe there are people who deserve to die. As an adult he went on a killing spree and buried his victims in a bamboo grove. After killing a woman, he gets into a car accident suffers a head injury, resulting in degenerative Alzheimer's disease. He stops killing, resumes his job as a veterinarian, and continues caring for his daughter Eun-hee (Kim Seol-hyun).

After multiple visits to the local police station (as he forgets his address), Byeong-soo strikes up a friendship with policeman Byeong-man (Oh Dal-su). At Eun-hee's behest, Byeong-soo uses a recorder to maintain his routines. He types everything he can remember into a memoir and saves it on his laptop. Byeong-soo goes to a poetry class, where his poetic depictions of murders attracts classmate Jo Yeon-joo (Hwang Seok-jeong).

When the small town is shaken by the murders of two young women, Byeong-soo is confused and wonders if he did the killing. He goes to the bamboo grove to check for new burial sites but finds none. On the way back, Byeong-soo hits another car. Noticing a bloody bag in the other car's trunk, he collects blood on his handkerchief. The car's driver claims it is a deer's corpse and drives away without exchanging contact information.

After ascertaining the blood sample is human, Byeong-soo anonymously calls the police, describing the encounter and the car's make and license plate. The tip is considered a prank as the car's driver is policeman Min Tae-joo (Kim Nam-gil). Byeong-soo also asks Byeong-man to run the license plate separately. Instinctively realizing Tae-joo is a serial killer, Byeong-soo deduces where he was taking the body to. He finds the body and tips the police, catching Tae-joo's attention.

Tae-joo goes to Byeong-soo's clinic, where he meets Eun-hee. After a short while, the two begin dating. Byeong-soo sees the pair but does not recognize Tae-joo. After Byeong-man tells him about the license plate's owner, Byeong-soo realizes Tae-joo is the killer who uses his daughter to taunt and threaten him. He gives Byeong-man the handkerchief with the blood, telling him it's from Tae-joo's car.

Suppressing his self-doubts, Byeong-soo is determined to kill Tae-joo, but his failing mind and body betray him. He starts experiencing hallucinations and a week's worth of memory is erased.

Byeong-soo wakes up to find himself tied up in his bedroom, with Tae-joo reading and liberally editing his memoir. Tae-joo admits to being the killer and having swapped the handkerchief with the blood sample. Byeong-soo tries to grab his bag for a weapon but fails and spills its contents onto the floor. Tae-joo threatens to kill Eun-hee unless Byeong-soo takes the blame for his crimes, then tranquilizes him. Byeong-soo wakes up and only vaguely remembers what happened.

Fearing for his daughter's safety, Byeong-soo orders her to stay with his sister Maria (Gil Hae-yeon) at her convent. He follows Tae-joo to an abandoned house and finds footage of Yeon-joo being held hostage. When he presents this evidence to the police, they suspect Byeong-soo himself is responsible. Upon trying to call Maria to prove Eun-hee's safety, Byeong-soo recalls Maria committed suicide shortly after their father's death. Police begin digging up the bamboo grove, finding the remains of past victims and Yeon-joo.

At home, Byeong-soo remembers his last kill - his adulterous wife. Before dying, she spitefully said Eun-hee was not his daughter. Byeong-soo's head injury causes him to forget this revelation and he continues caring for Eun-hee. Byeong-soo recalls almost strangling Eun-hee, mistaking her for his wife, and becomes convinced that he might have killed his daughter in a fit of insanity.

Guilt-ridden, Byeong-soo prepares to kill himself. However, he then hears Tae-joo confessing his crimes on the recorder, which recorded their earlier confrontation when Byeong-soo dropped his bag. Renewed with vigor, Byeong-soo calls Byeong-man and convinces him Tae-joo is the killer.

Byeong-man follows Tae-joo to a remote cabin. Tae-joo strangles Byeong-man and ties up Eun-hee after she sees the body. Byeong-soo confronts Tae-joo. After a fight during which his condition almost cost him his life, with Eun-hee's help, Byeong-soo overpowers and kills Tae-joo. Eun-hee, having learned from Tae-joo earlier that her mother's body was found in the bamboo grove, is terrified of her father. He assures Eun-hee that she is not a murderer's daughter, as they are not blood-related.

Byeong-soo is subsequently incarcerated and processed into an internment facility. Eun-hee listens to Byeong-soo's last recording and decides to forgive him. She visits Byeong-soo, whose memory has deteriorated to the point that he mistakes her for Maria. In a brief moment of clarity, Byeong-soo decides to kill himself before wanting to live more and remember what he is—a murderer. Before his suicide, his symptoms manifest again.

Byeong-soo stands outside a train tunnel. He holds up his daughter's locket with the photo of Tae-joo inside. He sees Tae-joo smirking at him and thinks to himself, "Don't trust your memory. Min Tae-joo is still alive".

== Cast ==
- Sul Kyung-gu as Kim Byeong-soo, a retired serial killer with Alzheimer's disease. He only kills those who have committed sins "equally worse," and he makes them pay the price.
- Kim Nam-gil as Tae-joo, a local policeman whom Kim suspects to be a serial killer.
- Kim Seol-hyun as Kim Eun-hee, Byeong-soo's daughter who takes care of him because of his disease. She becomes Tae-joo's girlfriend.
- Oh Dal-su as Byeong-man, a policeman determined on finding murderers of the town.
- Hwang Seok-jeong as Jo Yeon-joo, a woman taking poetry class with Byeong-soo's, whom she annoys, flirts with, and doesn't take seriously.
- Gil Hae-yeon as Maria, a nun and Byeong-soo's older sister.
  - Kim Hye-yoon as young Maria
- Kim Han-joon as detective
- Kim Dong-hee
- Kim Jung-young
- Jo Jae-yoon as doctor

== Release ==
Memoir of a Murderer was released in South Korea on 6 September 2017. According to its distributor Showbox, the film was scheduled to open in North America on 8 September 2017, two days after its domestic release. It was also released in Australia, New Zealand, France, Turkey, Taiwan, Japan and the Philippines.

Memoir of a Murderer was also shown in the Thrill section at the 61st edition of the BFI London Film Festival, which runs from 4–15 October.

=== Director's Cut ===
The director's cut of the film features an alternate ending, which fundamentally changes the pathos of the film. It includes 10 more minutes of footage and has had its rating changed from 15 to R.

Primarily, Tae-joo's corpse disappears after he confesses to Eun-hee at the cabin. Byeong-soo is subsequently arrested and incarcerated. Back in the jail, the investigator decides to let him go, since the murder cases have long expired and considering the fact that Byeong-soo has Alzheimer. In the final scene, Byeong-soo exits the old railroad tunnel from the opening shot of the film. Suddenly his symptoms triggers again, his face twitches, and he starts wearing his shoes in the wrong order. He also begins to recollect his memories in a seemingly odd sequence, such as him being the culprit of all the recent murders, Tae-joo was actually the one to hit his car, and he has been drowned under the nearby reservoir, while the voice of the investigator can be heard, "The memories of those who are losing it tend to protect themselves first". At the end of the sequence, Byeong-soo stares into the camera and smirks, thinking to himself, "Do not trust your memory".

== Reception ==
=== Box office ===
The film reached over 1 million admissions in just 5 days of its release (6–10 September) topping the Korean box office and grossing US$8.6 million. As of 17 September, the film marked 2.06 million admissions grossing US$14.7 million nationwide, the first South Korean thriller film to reach 2 million ticket sales in 2017.

=== Accolades ===
Year	Award	Category	Recipient	Result
2017	1st The Seoul Awards	Best Actor	Sul Kyung-gu	Nominated
2017	1st The Seoul Awards	Best New Actress	Kim Seol-hyun	Nominated
2017	17th Director's Cut Awards	Best Actor	Sul Kyung-gu	Won
2018	9th Korea Film Reporters Association Film Awards (KOFRA)	Best Actor	Sul Kyung-gu	Won
