= Drama Special Series =

- Genre: Drama
- Country of origin: South Korea
- Original language: Korean
- No. of seasons: 3
- No. of episodes: 70

Original release
- Network: KBS2
- Release: December 11, 2010 – July 10, 2013

Drama Special Series (Korean: 드라마 스페셜 연작시리즈) is a weekly program on KBS2 showing multiple episodes short dramas, with each story having a different cast, director, and writer. The format is based on Drama Special.

== Drama Special Series ==
=== Season 1 ===
Date	Title	Episodes	Cast	Writer	Director	Ref.
December 11–18, 2010	Rock, Rock, Rock	4	No Min-woo, Hong Ah-reum, Jang Kyung-ah, Noh Min-hyuk, Devin Kim, Bang Joong-hyun, Kang Doo, Kim Yoon-tae, Kim Jong-seo, Jo Soon-chang, Heo Jung-gyoo	Park Kyung-sun, Bang Hyo-geum	Lee Won-ik	
January 2–23, 2011	Special Task Force MSS	4	Oh Man-seok, Son Hyun-joo, Lee Kyung-jin, Ahn Suk-hwan, Go Myung-hwan, Yoon Hae-young, Kim Young-jae, Min Ji-ah, Lee Chul-min, Han Tae-il, Lee Jung-yong, Yoon Joo-sang, Kang Nam-gil, Kang Chul-sung, Jin Yong-wook	Park Ji-sook	Han Joon-seo	
January 30 –March 20, 2011	White Christmas	8	Kim Sang-kyung, Baek Sung-hyun, Kim Young-kwang, Lee Soo-hyuk, Kwak Jung-wook, Hong Jong-hyun, Esom, Kim Woo-bin, Sung Joon, Jung Suk-won, Lee El, Yoo Jang-young	Park Yeon-seon	Kim Yong-soo	
March 27 – April 3, 2011	400-year-old Dream	2	Han Eun-jung, Ryu Tae-joon, Ahn Byung-kyung, Seo Ji-young, Kim Byung-chan, Heo Jae-ho, Kim Hyung-mi, Kim Chun-man, Yoo Jong-geun, Choo Seung-wook	Chae Hye-young, Kim Shin-tae	Moon Young-jin	
April 10 – May 1, 2011	Hair Show	4	Baek Jin-hee, Lee Seung-hyo, Cha Soo-yeon, Hyun Woo, Kim Young-ran, Kim Mi-kyung, Lee Yoon-sung, Ahn Yong-joon, Choi Yoon-so, Marco, Oh Na-mi	Heo Sung-hye	Moon Joon-ha	
May 8–29, 2011	Perfect Spy	4	Kim Heung-soo, Yoo In-young, Lee Hee-joon, Lee Dae-yeon, Seo Hyun-chul, Jang Shin-young, Uhm Tae-goo, Son Hyun-joo, Ricky Kim, Park Jae-woong, Jo Chang-geun, Chae Byung-chan, Jung Woo-hyuk	Han Sang-un	Park Hyin-seok	

=== Season 2 ===
Date	Title	Episodes	Cast
2011-Dec-04	For My Son	4	Choi Soo-jong, Hwang Soo-jung, Jang Hyun-sung, Park Won-sang
2012-Jan-01	Amore Mio	4	Jung Woong-in, Kim Bo-kyung, Kim Young-jae, Dana
2012-Feb-12	Little Girl Detective Park Hae-sol	4	Nam Ji-hyun, Kim Joo-young, Lee Min-woo, Kim Hyun-kyun
2012-Feb-29	Just an Ordinary Love Story	4	Yoo Da-in, Yeon Woo-jin, Kim Mi-kyung
2012-Mar-11	The Brightest Moment in Life	2	Yeo Min-joo, Kim Hee-jung, Kim Do-yun
2012-Mar-25	The True Colors of Gang and Cheol	4	Oh Man-seok, Hong Soo-ah, Go Myung-hwan, Lee Kan-hee
2012-Apr-22	Missing Case of National Assembly Member Jung Chi-sung	4	Yu Oh-seong, Nam Sung-jin, Lee In-hye
2012-May-20	SOS - Save Our School	2	Jung Woong-in, Seo Shin-ae, Kim Ae-ran

=== Season 3 ===
Date	Title	Episodes	Cast
2013-Jan-06	Sirius / 시리우스	4	Seo Jun-young, Ryu Seung-soo, Uhm Hyun-kyung
2013-Feb-17	Their Perfect Day / 그녀들의 완벽한 하루	4	Song Seon-mi, Shin Dong-mi, Kim Se-ah, Byun Jung-soo
2013-Mar-17	Like a Fairytale / 동화처럼	4	Lee Chun-hee, Choi Yoon-young, Kim Jung-san
2013-Jul-10	Puberty Medley / 사춘기 메들리	4	Kwak Dong-yeon, Lee Se-young, Kwak Jung-wook

== See also ==
- Drama City
- KBS Drama Special
