= Yoo Da-in =

South Korean actress (born 1984)

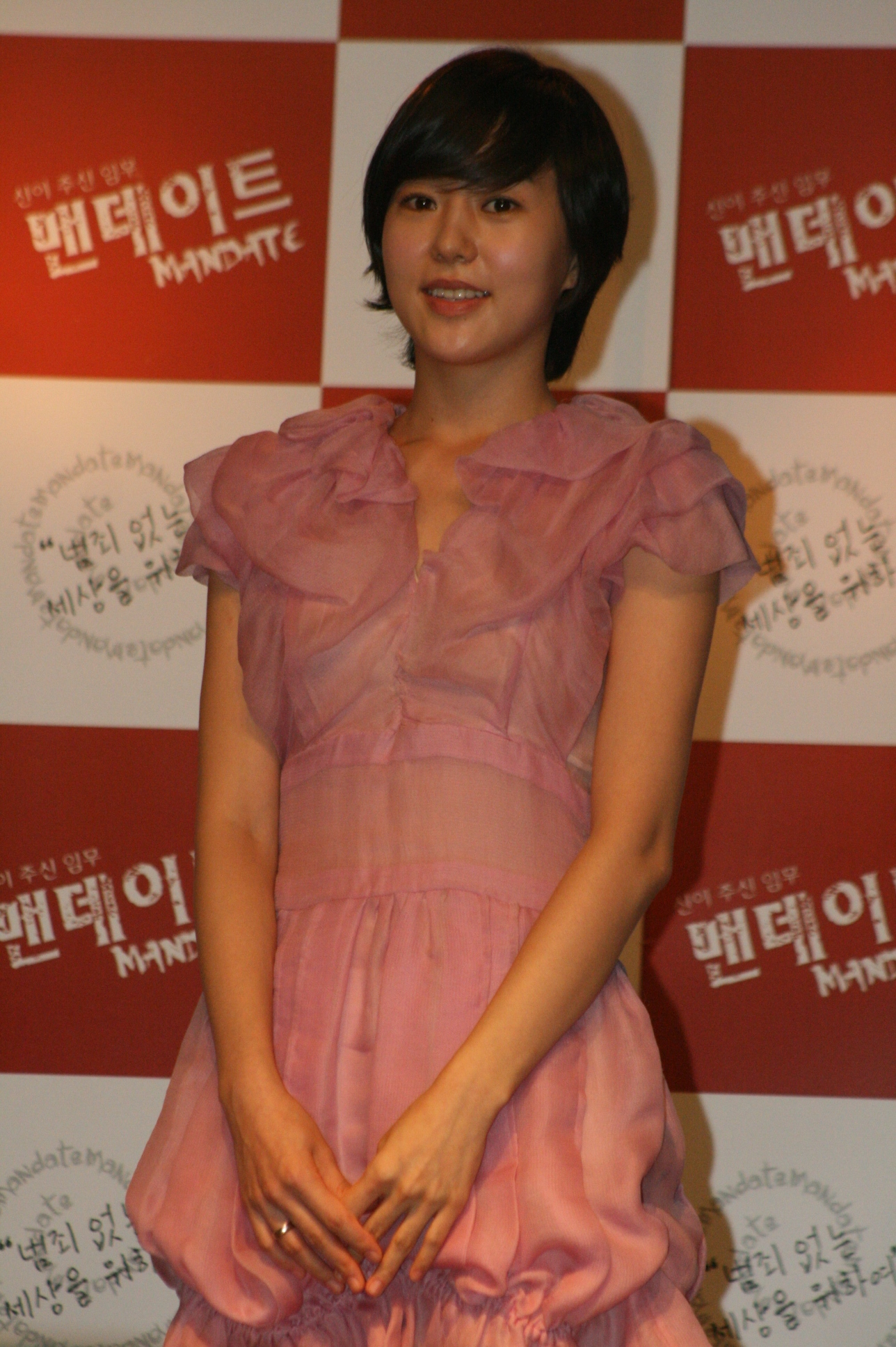
- Yoo in 2008
- Born: Ma Young-seon; February 9, 1984 (age 42); South Korea
- Education: Seoul College - Theatre and Film
- Occupation: Actress
- Years active: 2005–present
- Agent: Plum ANC
- Spouse: Min Yong-geun (m. 2021)
- Children: 1

Korean name
- Hangul: 마영선
- RR: Ma Yeongseon
- MR: Ma Yŏngsŏn

Stage name
- Hangul: 유다인
- RR: Yu Dain
- MR: Yu Tain

Yoo Da-in (Korean: 유다인; born February 9, 1984), birth name Ma Young-seon, is a South Korean actress. She is best known for her performance in the indie film Re-encounter, her first leading role. In 2016, she played a supporting role in South Korean television series The Doctors.

== Personal life ==
In June 2021, Yoo's agency announced that Yoo was planning to marry director Min Yong-geun and hold a private event with only family and close friends. On October 27, 2022, Yoo announced that she is pregnant with the couple's first child. She gave birth to a daughter on April 3, 2023.

== Filmography ==
=== Film ===
Year	Title	Role	Notes	Ref.
2005	The Beast and the Beauty	Museum attendant		
2006	Cinderella	Su-kyoung		
2007	Her... The One That I Love	Manhwa artist "She"	Short film	
2008	Heartbreak Library	Girl that walks across the ledge		
2008	Mandate: Mission from the Gods	Journalist Shin		
2010	No Mercy	Lee Soo-jin		
2010	Re-encounter	Hye-hwa		
2011	The Client	Seo Jung-ah		
2012	Over My Dead Body	Jang Ha-yeon		
2012	Children of Heaven	Yoo-jin		
2012	Almost Che	Seo Ye-rin		
2013	The Suspect	Choi Kyung-hee		
2016	Detour	Na-rae		
2019	The Snob	Seon Woo-jeong		
2021	I Don't Fire Myself	Jeong-eun		
2021	Taste of Horror –Tick Tock Tick Tock		Short Film	
2022	Day and Moon	Min-hee		
2023	Shape of Tulip	Yuriko		
2023	Havana	Yoona		
2025	Nocturnal	Cha Moon-young		

=== Television series ===
Year	Title	Network	Role	Notes	Ref.
2005	Hello My Teacher	SBS	Yoo Da-in		
2005	Love Needs a Miracle	SBS	Jang Kyung-hee		
2007	Drama City: "For a Young Man in My Neighborhood"	KBS2	Choi Soo-kyung		
2009	Glory of Youth	KBS1	Lee Soon-young		
2010	Legend of the Patriots	KBS1	Nurse Jung-sook		
2011	KBS Drama Special: "Our Happy Days of Youth"	KBS2	Kang Soon-nam		
2012	Drama Special Series: "Just an Ordinary Love Story"	KBS2	Kim Yoon-hye		
2012	Tasty Life	SBS	Jang Joo-hyun		
2014	Diary of a Night Watchman	MBC	Yeon-ha	Cameo	
2014	Plus Nine Boys	tvN	Joo Da-in		
2016	One More Happy Ending	MBC	Baek Da-jung		
2016	The Doctors	SBS	Jo In-joo		
2016	Weightlifting Fairy Kim Bok-joo	MBC	Go Ah-young		
2018	Sketch	JTBC	Min Ji-soo		
2020	Memorials	KBS2	Yoon Hee-Soo		

=== Music video appearances ===
Year	Song title	Artist
2007	"Don't Cry"	Park Sang-min
2007	"Days of Love You Owe"	Yoon Gun
2007	"Wicked Tongue"	Ne;MO
2008	"Only You"	KCM

== Accolades ==
=== Awards and nominations ===
Year	Award	Category	Nominated work	Result
2010	36th Seoul Independent Film Festival	Independent Star Award	Re-encounter	Won
2011	48th Grand Bell Awards	Best New Actress	Re-encounter	Nominated
2011	31st Korean Association of Film Critics Awards	Best New Actress	Re-encounter	Won
2011	32nd Blue Dragon Film Awards	Best New Actress	Re-encounter	Nominated
2012	13th Asian Film Festival (Tours, France)	Best Actress	Re-encounter	Won
2012	KBS Drama Awards	Best Actress in a One-Act/Short/Special Drama	Just an Ordinary Love Story	Won
2021	38th Fajr International Film Festival	Best Eastern Vista Actress	I Don't Fire Myself	Diploma Honorary

=== Listicles ===
Name of publisher, year listed, name of listicle, and placement
Publisher	Year	Listicle	Placement	Ref.
Korean Film Council	2021	Korean Actors 200 (Note: Introduces 200 actors that best represent the present and future of Korean cinema to the people in the film industry all over the world.)	Included	
