= BXB (group) =

South Korean boy band (2022–2026)

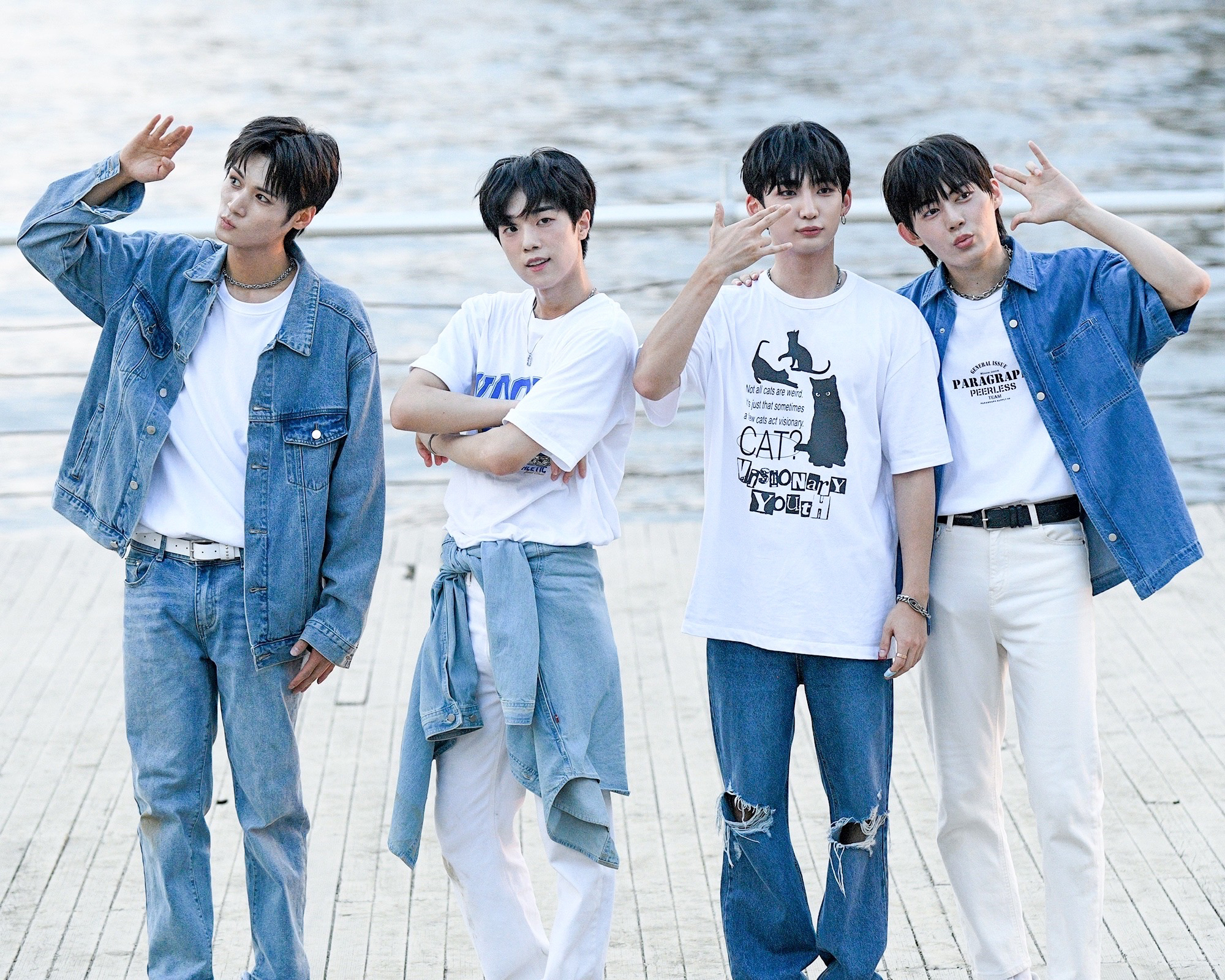
- BXB in 2024

Background information
- Also known as: APR Project
- Origin: South Korea
- Genre: K-pop
- Years active: 2022–2026
- Labels: APR; Wolfburn
- Past members: Jihun; Hyunwoo; Siwoo; Hamin; June; Yuki

BXB (Korean: 비엑스비) was a South Korean boy band managed by Wolfburn. Following the disbandment of boy group TRCNG, former bandmates Jihun, Hyunwoo, Siwoo, and Hamin formed the quartet APR Project and began releasing music in 2022. With the addition of June, BXB released its single album Intro: Flight and a New Beginning on January 30, 2023. On April 17, 2026, Wolfburn announced that the group would disband in the first half of 2026.

== History ==
=== 2017–2022: Background and formation ===
In 2017, TS Entertainment debuted TRCNG with ten members. In April 2018, the CEO of the record label died; company operations were negatively impacted and promotional activities for the group stalled. In November 2019, members Wooyeop and Taeseon filed a suit against the agency, citing alleged abuse by staff and requesting the termination of their contracts. TRCNG disbanded in March 2022.

Later that year, the group APR Project—short for April Project—was formed by APR Entertainment with former TRCNG members Jihun (leader, vocals), Hyunwoo (rap), Siwoo (rap, vocals), and Hamin (vocals). They sought to have the other former members be part of the new group, but they did not join either due to mandatory military service or personal reasons. APR Project planned to release a "youth trilogy" dealing with sorrow, beginnings, and flight. It released its first single album entitled Boyhood I S#1 on June 6. It was supported by the single "11:59", a future R&B song about the "sorrow of youth". Four months later, the quartet released the single album Boyhood I S#2 and the uptempo pop lead track "Scene" with a guest feature by former bandmate Hohyeon.

=== 2023–2024: Debut ===
On January 10, 2023, record label Wolfburn uploaded a BXB logo motion video and announced its plans to debut the five-member group comprising the APR Project members with the addition of June. An acronym for Boy by Brush, the name signifies "that the members will paint the scenes and emotions of youth with their music." Following a series of video and photo teasers, BXB released its single album (Note: Marketed as an "intro" album.) and final installment of its trilogy Intro: Flight and a New Beginning on January 30, 2023. It was accompanied by the single "Fly Away", an uptempo pop rock number. BXB competed on the reality competition show Peak Time (2023) as Team 04:00. Citing health reasons, Jun began a hiatus from promotional activities later that year. The group released its first single album Chapter 1. Our Youth and mid-tempo R&B single "Planet" on August 3.

BXB recorded "The Black Cat Nero", a remake of the Italian children's song "Volevo un gatto nero", and made it available as a pre-release track one week ahead of its second single album. Chapter 2. Wings and funky gospel-inspired pop single "Airplane" were released on January 11, 2024.

=== 2025–2026: Japanese debut and disbandment ===
Ahead of BXB's debut in Japan, Wolfburn announced the addition of a new member named Yuki. The group will release its first Japanese single Chapter 3. Journey and the pop-rock lead track "I Wish" on February 19, 2025.

On April 17, 2026, Wolfburn announced that BXB would conclude their group activities following the expiration of the members' contracts in the first half of the year. The group held a series of performances in Japan from April 17 to 19 and is scheduled to hold a final fan meeting in South Korea in May 2026.

== Members ==
List of members and roles.

- Jihun – vocals
- Hyunwoo – leader, rap
- Siwoo – rap
- Hamin – vocals
- June – vocals (on hiatus since 2023)
- Yuki – vocals

== Discography ==
=== Single albums ===
Title	Details	Peak chart positions	Sales
Title	Details	KOR	Sales
Boyhood I S#1 (Note: Released as APR Project.)	Released: June 6, 2022; Label: APR, NHN Bugs; Format: CD, digital download, streaming	—	
Boyhood I S#2	Released: October 10, 2022; Label: APR, NHN Bugs; Format: CD, digital download, streaming	—	
Intro: Flight and a New Beginning	Released: January 30, 2023; Label: Wolfburn, Danal; Format: CD, digital download, streaming	—	
Chapter 1. Our Youth	Released: August 3, 2023; Label: Wolfburn, Danal; Format: CD, digital download, streaming	40	KOR: 6,566
Chapter 2. Wings	Released: January 11, 2024; Label: Wolfburn, Danal; Format: CD, digital download, streaming	28	KOR: 4,644

=== Singles ===
Title	Year	Album
Korean
"11:59" (11시 59분)	2022	Boyhood I S#1
"Scene" (장면)	2022	Boyhood I S#2
"Fly Away" (도약; 跳躍)	2023	Intro: Flight and a New Beginning
"Planet"	2023	Chapter 1. Our Youth
"Planet (Twin Ver.)"	2023	Non-album single
"The Black Cat Nero" (검은고양이 네로)	2024	Chapter 2. Wings
"Airplane"	2024	Chapter 2. Wings
"The Black Cat Nero" (검은고양이 네로; Aster Remix)	2024	Non-album single
Japanese
"I Wish"	2025	Chapter 3. Journey

=== Guest appearances ===
Title	Year	Release
"Victory Song" (승전가)	2023	Peak Time - 1 Round Rival Match Part.1
"Hola!" (올라!)	2023	Peak Time - 3Round Originals Match
"Move"	2024	Hip Hop 20th Anniversary Album x BXB

== Filmography ==
=== Television shows ===
Year	Title	Role	Ref.
2023	Peak Time	Contestant	
