= Jin Se-yeon =

South Korean actress (born 1994)

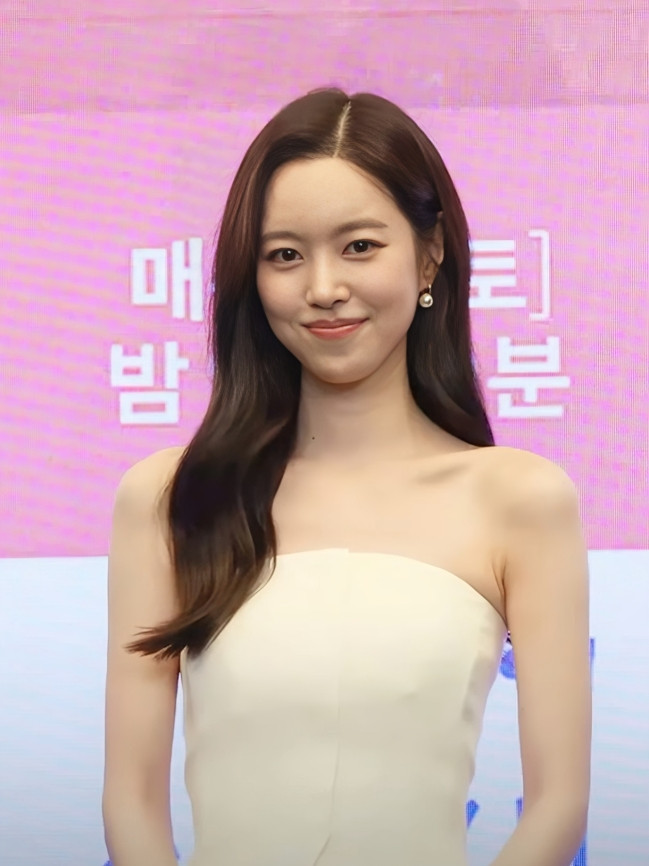
- Jin in 2024
- Born: Kim Yoon-jung; February 15, 1994 (age 32); Seoul, South Korea
- Other name: Jin Se-yun
- Education: Chung-Ang University – B.A. in Theater and Film
- Occupation: Actress
- Years active: 2010–present
- Agent(s): Fantagio; Early Bird

Korean name
- Hangul: 김윤정
- RR: Gim Yunjeong
- MR: Kim Yunjŏng

Stage name
- Hangul: 진세연
- Hanja: 陳世娫
- RR: Jin Seyeon
- MR: Chin Seyŏn

Kim Yoon-jung (Korean: 김윤정; February 15, 1994), commonly known as Jin Se-yeon (진세연), is a South Korean actress. She is notable for her appearances in television series Bridal Mask (2012), Doctor Stranger (2014), Flowers of the Prison (2016), Grand Prince (2018), and Recipe for Love (2026).

== Career ==
=== 2010–2015: Beginnings and finding successes ===
Jin Se-yeon began her career as an idol trainee for girl group Jewelry under Star Empire Entertainment. Before long, she started to appear in various TV commercials, which then steered her direction into acting. Although her debut role was in the 2010 SBS drama It's Okay, Daddy's Girl, her first casting was actually for the 2011 film White: Melody of Death. She then acted in the lesbian-themed Drama Special titled Daughters of Bilitis Club and portrayed the teenage version of Han Ji-hye's female lead character in The Duo.

Her first chance at a starring role came when she won the audition for the titular protagonist in the daily drama My Daughter the Flower. She then starred in the 1930s period drama Bridal Mask. Since then, Jin has starred in various genres, among them a musical melodrama Five Fingers, medical-espionage drama Doctor Stranger, and romantic-comedy film Enemies In-Law.

=== 2016–present: Transition to leading roles and rising popularity ===
In 2016, Jin played the heroine for the summer blockbuster war film, Operation Chromite, alongside Liam Neeson and Lee Jung-jae. She was then chosen as the protagonist for MBC's 55th-founding anniversary historical drama directed by Lee Byung-hoon, Flowers of the Prison.

In 2018, Jin's popularity started to rise due to her performance in the historical drama Grand Prince. The series was a ratings success, becoming the highest rated TV Chosun drama since the network's establishment in 2011.

In 2019, Jin starred in the fantasy-mystery drama Item as a criminal profiler. The same year she was cast in the historical fantasy drama Queen: Love and War.

In 2020, Jin was cast in the mystery romance drama Born Again alongside Jang Ki-yong and Lee Soo-hyuk.

In 2024, Jin returned to television after a four-year hiatus in the MBN romantic comedy series Bad Memory Eraser, playing a genius brain specialist who becomes the "first love" of a patient after a memory-erasing operation.

In 2026, Jin starred in the KBS2 weekend family drama Recipe for Love as Gong Joo-ah, who abandons medical school to become a fashion designer. The series aired 50 episodes from January 31 to July 19, 2026, peaking at an 18.0% nationwide rating.

On November 13, it was reported that Jin signed an exclusive contract with Fantagio.

== Personal life ==
Jin revealed in late 2012 that she had added a year to her real age in her résumé, actually being born in 1994, and not in 1993. Her agency explained, "Jin Se-yeon was only 17 years old when she debuted. She was so young that it was hard for her to land any roles. That's why we added a year to her age."

In 2015, Jin denied rumors that she came from a wealthy or influential family, which had circulated because of her rapid rise; she noted that she had previously played supporting and younger-version roles, and suggested the rumors arose because she landed lead roles earlier than most.

== Filmography ==
=== Film ===
| Year | Title | Role | Ref. |
|---|---|---|---|
| 2011 | White: Melody of Death | Jenny | |
| 2014 | The Language of Love | In-ha | |
| 2015 | Enemies In-Law | Park Young-hee | |
| 2016 | Operation Chromite | Han Chae-seon | |

=== Television series ===
| Year | Title | Role | Ref. |
|---|---|---|---|
| 2010 | It's Okay, Daddy's Girl | Jung Se-yeon | |
| 2011 | KBS Drama Special – "Daughters of Bilitis Club" | Kim Joo-yeon | |
| 2011 | The Duo | young Dong-nyeo | |
| 2011 | My Daughter the Flower | Yang Kkot-nim | |
| 2012 | Bridal Mask | Oh Mok-dan / Esther / Boon-yi | |
| 2012 | Five Fingers | Hong Da-mi | |
| 2014 | Inspiring Generation | Yoon Ok-ryun | |
| 2014 | Doctor Stranger | Song Jae-hee / Han Seung-hee | |
| 2015 | High-End Crush | Yoo Yi-ryung | |
| 2016 | Flowers of the Prison | Ok-nyeo / Lee Seo-won | |
| 2018 | Grand Prince | Sung Ja-hyun | |
| 2019 | Item | Shin So-young | |
| 2019 | Queen: Love and War | Kang Eun-gi / Kang Eun-bo / Hong Yeon | |
| 2020 | Born Again | Jung Ha-eun / Jung Sa-bin | |
| 2024 | Bad Memory Eraser | Kyung Joo-yeon | |
| 2026 | Recipe for Love | Gong Joo-ah | |

=== Television shows ===
| Year | Title | Role | Ref. |
|---|---|---|---|
| 2019–2020 | Stars' Top Recipe at Fun-staurant | Cast / chef (episodes 1–10) | |
| 2020 | 2020 KBS Entertainment Awards | MC with Jun Hyun-moo and Kim Jun-Hyun | |

=== Music video appearances ===
| Year | Song title | Artist | Notes | Ref. |
|---|---|---|---|---|
| 2010 | "Love Bear" (사랑곰) | KCM | | |
| 2012 | "Goodbye Day" (굿바이데이) | Ulala Session | Bridal Mask OST | |
| 2015 | "Rolling" (또르르) | Acoustic Collabo | | |

== Theater ==
| Year | Title | Role | Ref. |
|---|---|---|---|
| 2013 | Closer | Alice | |

== Discography ==
List of singles, showing year released, and name of the album
| Title | Year | Album |
|---|---|---|
| "I Have No Problems" (with Cha Gil-young) | 2012 | Non-album single |
| "Only You Forever" (with Hong Jong-hyun) | 2015 | Enemies In-Law OST |

== Awards and nominations ==
Name of the award ceremony, year presented, category, nominee of the award, and the result of the nomination
| Award ceremony | Year | Category | Nominee / Work | Result | Ref. |
|---|---|---|---|---|---|
| APAN Star Awards | 2014 | Popular Star Award | Doctor Stranger | Won | |
| APAN Star Awards | 2014 | Excellence Award, Actress in a Miniseries | Doctor Stranger | Nominated | |
| K-Drama Star Awards | 2012 | Acting Award, actress | Bridal Mask | Nominated | |
| KBS Drama Awards | 2012 | Best New Actress | Bridal Mask | Won | |
| KBS Drama Awards | 2012 | Best Couple Award | Jin Se-yeon (with Joo Won); Bridal Mask | Nominated | |
| KBS Drama Awards | 2012 | Excellence Award, Actress in a Serial Drama | Bridal Mask | Nominated | |
| KBS Drama Awards | 2012 | Netizen Award, actress | Bridal Mask | Nominated | |
| KBS Drama Awards | 2020 | Excellence Award, Actress in a Miniseries | Born Again | Nominated | |
| Korea Drama Awards | 2012 | Best New Actress | My Daughter the Flower | Nominated | |
| Korea Drama Awards | 2016 | Excellence Award, actress | Flowers of the Prison | Nominated | |
| Korean Culture and Entertainment Awards | 2012 | Best New Actress | Bridal Mask | Nominated | |
| Korean Culture and Entertainment Awards | 2016 | Best Actress (film) | Operation Chromite | Won | |
| MBC Drama Awards | 2016 | Excellence Award, Actress in a Special Project Drama | Flowers of the Prison | Won | |
| MBC Drama Awards | 2016 | Best Couple Award | Jin Se-yeon with Seo Ha-joon; Flowers of the Prison | Nominated | |
| MBC Drama Awards | 2016 | Grand Prize (Daesang) | Flowers of the Prison | Nominated | |
| MBC Drama Awards | 2019 | Top Excellence Award, Actress in a Monday-Tuesday Miniseries | Item | Nominated | |
| SBS Drama Awards | 2011 | New Star Award | My Daughter the Flower | Won | |
| SBS Drama Awards | 2012 | Best Couple Award | Jin Se-yeon with Ju Ji-hoon; Five Fingers | Nominated | |
| SBS Drama Awards | 2014 | Excellence Award, Actress in a Drama Special | Doctor Stranger | Nominated | |
