= Kim Sun-bin =

Kim Sun-bin may refer to:

- Kim Sun-bin (baseball)
- Kim Sun-bin (actor)
