= Item (TV series) =

2019 South Korean television series

- Promotional poster
- Hangul: 아이템
- RR: Aitem
- MR: Ait'em
- Genre: Mystery; Fantasy
- Based on: Item by Kim Jung-seok and Min Hyung
- Written by: Jung Yi-do (Note: His birth name is Jung Shin-kyoo. He started to use the pen name "Jung Yi-do" in this drama. He previously wrote the screenplay for OCN's Save Me.)
- Directed by: Kim Sung-wook
- Starring: Joo Ji-hoon; Kim Kang-woo; Jin Se-yeon
- Country of origin: South Korea
- Original language: Korean
- No. of episodes: 32 (Note: In order to circumvent Korean laws that prevent commercial breaks in the middle of an episode, what would previously have been aired as single 70 minute episodes are now being repackaged as two 35 minute episodes, with two episodes being shown each night with a commercial break between the two.)

Production
- Camera setup: Single-camera
- Running time: 35 minutes
- Production company: MBC

Original release
- Network: MBC TV
- Release: February 11 – April 2, 2019

Item (Korean: 아이템; RR: Aitem) is a 2019 South Korean television series based on the KakaoPage webtoon series of the same name and set to be a mystery fantasy drama. It stars Ju Ji-hoon, Jin Se-yeon, Kim Kang-woo and Kim Yoo-ri. It aired on MBC from February 11 to April 2, 2019.

== Synopsis ==
A prosecutor and a criminal profiler work together in their attempts to decipher the secrets behind various mysterious items which have special powers.

== Cast ==
=== Main ===
- Ju Ji-hoon as Kang Gon / Kim Sung-kyu
  - Kim Young-dae as young Kang Gon / Kim Sung-kyu

A prosecutor who tries very hard to save his niece while also finding himself entangled in a mystery of supernatural items.

- Jin Se-yeon as Shin So-young

A criminal profiler who possesses a lot of skills, and, even when confronted with shocking crime scenes, stays composed.

- Kim Kang-woo as Jo Se-hwang

The vice chairman of the Hwawon Group who is also a sociopath that collects items with supernatural powers by using his power and wealth. He murders anyone who tries to get in his way.

- Kim Yoo-ri as Han Yoo-na

A prosecutor who becomes Jo Se-hwang's informant for the sake of her father.

=== Supporting ===
- Lee Dae-yeon as Shin Goo-cheol

Shin So-young's father who helps Kang Gon. He is also a veteran investigator.

- Park Won-sang as Goo Dong-yeong: A catholic priest.
- Oh Seung-hoon as Seo Yo-han

A good-looking young detective with a lot of skills who earns the attention of women. Also Shin So-yeong's colleague.

- Kim Byung-ki as Jo Kwan

Jo Se-hwang's father.

- Shin Rin-ah as Kang Da-In

Kang Gon's niece who lost her ability to speak after her parents' deaths.

- Kim Do-hyun as Choi Ho-joon

Leader of the Special Investigation Unit's profiler team and Shin So-young's boss.

- Lee Jung-hyun as Ko Dae-soo

A gangster who is the original owner of a bracelet.

- Kim Min-kyo as Bang Hak-jae

A thief who is currently serving his term in prison.

- Im Young-sik
- Lee Sung-woo
- Yuk Jin-soo
- Jung In-gyeom
- Lee Joo-bin

== Production ==
The first script reading was held on September 20, 2018 with the attendance of cast and crew at the MBC in Sangam-dong. The author of the original webtoon was also present.

The lead couple Ju Ji-hoon and Jin Se-yeon previously worked together in the 2012 Five Fingers drama series.

== Original soundtrack ==
Item OST

Soundtrack album by Various artists
- Recorded: 2018
- Genre: Soundtrack
- Languages: Korean; English
- Labels: Vlending Co., Ltd.

=== Part 1 ===
Released on February 18, 2018
No.	Title	Artist	Length
1.	"Close to night" (비밀낙원)	Son Seung-yeon	3:42
2.	"Close to night" (Inst.)		3:42
Total length:			7:04

=== Part 2 ===
Released on February 26, 2018
No.	Title	Artist	Length
1.	"Tunnel" (비밀낙원)	The Vane	3:51
2.	"Tunnel" (Inst.)		3:51
Total length:			7:02

=== Part 3 ===
Released on March 4, 2018
No.	Title	Artist	Length
1.	"Tonight" (비밀낙원)	Hwang Chi-yeul	3:56
2.	"Tonight" (Inst.)		3:56
Total length:			7:12

=== Part 4 ===
Released on March 11, 2018
No.	Title	Artist	Length
1.	"Under the moon" (비밀낙원)	Lee Si-eun	4:53
2.	"Under the moon" (Inst.)		4:53
Total length:			9:06

=== Part 5 ===
Released on March 18, 2018
No.	Title	Artist	Length
1.	"To me" (비밀낙원)	Damon	3:57
2.	"To me" (Inst.)		3:57
Total length:			7:14

=== Part 6 ===
Released on April 2, 2018
No.	Title	Artist	Length
1.	"Wind" (비밀낙원)	Shannon	4:15
2.	"Wind" (Inst.)		4:15
Total length:			8:30

== Ratings ==
- In this table, the blue numbers represent the lowest ratings and the red numbers represent the highest ratings.
- N/A denotes that the rating is not known.

Ep.	Original broadcast date	Average audience share		
Ep.	Original broadcast date	AGB Nielsen		TNmS
Ep.	Original broadcast date	Nationwide	Seoul	Nationwide
1	February 11, 2019	4.0%	4.3%	4.7%
2	February 11, 2019	4.9%	5.4%	5.1%
3	February 12, 2019	4.0%	—N/a	4.2%
4	February 12, 2019	4.7%	—N/a	4.7%
5	February 18, 2019	3.4%	—N/a	4.1%
6	February 18, 2019	4.5%	—N/a	5.1%
7	February 19, 2019	3.5%	—N/a	—N/a
8	February 19, 2019	4.0%	—N/a	—N/a
9	February 25, 2019	2.8%	—N/a	—N/a
10	February 25, 2019	3.7%	—N/a	—N/a
11	February 26, 2019	2.8%	—N/a	—N/a
12	February 26, 2019	3.8%	—N/a	—N/a
13	March 4, 2019	2.6%	—N/a	—N/a
14	March 4, 2019	3.4%	—N/a	—N/a
15	March 5, 2019	3.5%	—N/a	3.4%
16	March 5, 2019	4.0%	—N/a	4.1%
17	March 11, 2019	3.2%	—N/a	3.5%
18	March 11, 2019	3.6%	—N/a	4.0%
19	March 12, 2019	3.4%	—N/a	—N/a
20	March 12, 2019	4.1%	—N/a	—N/a
21	March 18, 2019	2.9%	—N/a	3.3%
22	March 18, 2019	3.5%	—N/a	3.7%
23	March 19, 2019	2.8%	—N/a	3.7%
24	March 19, 2019	3.5%	—N/a	4.0%
25	March 25, 2019	3.5%	—N/a	3.2%
26	March 25, 2019	3.7%	—N/a	3.3%
27	March 26, 2019	4.1%	—N/a	—N/a
28	March 26, 2019	4.4%	—N/a	—N/a
29	April 1, 2019	3.8%	—N/a	—N/a
30	April 1, 2019	4.8%	—N/a	—N/a
31	April 2, 2019	3.5%	—N/a	—N/a
32	April 2, 2019	4.2%	—N/a	—N/a
Average		3.7%	— (Note: Due to some ratings not recorded, the exact average rating is unknown.)	—
