= Recipe for Love (TV series) =

2026 South Korean television series

- Promotional poster
- Hangul: 사랑을 처방해 드립니다
- Lit.: I'll Prescribe You Love
- RR: Sarangeul cheobanghae deurimnida
- MR: Sarangŭl ch'ŏbanghae tŭrimnida
- Genre: Coming-of-age; Family; Romance
- Written by: Park Ji-sook
- Directed by: Han Joon-seo; Bae Eun-hye
- Starring: Jin Se-yeon; Park Ki-woong
- Music by: Choi In-hee
- Country of origin: South Korea
- Original language: Korean
- No. of episodes: 50

Production
- Executive producer: Kim Seung-ha
- Producers: Bae Eun-hye; Park Man-young; Bae Seong-su; Moon Bo-mi
- Production company: HB Entertainment

Original release
- Network: KBS2
- Release: January 31 – July 19, 2026

Recipe for Love (Korean: 사랑을 처방해 드립니다) is a 2026 South Korean television series written by Park Ji-sook, directed by Han Joon-seo and Bae Eun-hye, and starring Jin Se-yeon and Park Ki-woong. The series is about two lovers who struggle to protect their relationship amidst their families' past conflicts and emotional scars, ultimately leading to a journey of healing, sharing love, and reuniting the families. It aired on KBS2 from January 31, to July 19, 2026, every Saturday and Sunday at 20:00 (KST).

== Synopsis ==
Gong Ju-ah and Yang Hyun-bin were childhood friends. They reunited when he returned from studying abroad in Argentina. Upon joining Taehan Group as General Director of the Fashion Business Division, he encountered Gong Ju-ah, a fashion designer by profession. Her acceptance of his proposal marked the renewal of their romantic relationship. But their families have been enemies since their grandparents' generation. Ju-ah's grandfather eloped with Hyun-bin's grandmother, starting the feud. Their families' 30-year feud, rooted in the Onjeong neighborhood, makes their relationship impossible.

== Cast ==
=== Main ===
- Jin Se-yeon as Gong Ju-ah

Born to parents who are both doctors, she was pushed into pursuing medicine, but eventually shifted gears and pursued her dream of becoming a clothes designer, and landed a job at Taehan Group. She quickly rises to team leader, but after an accident, she's demoted and ends up working with Hyun-bin.

- Park Ki-woong as Yang Hyun-bin

A newly appointed general manager of Taehan Group's fashion division. He meets Ju-ah again at work, a childhood friend that he has deep feelings for.

=== Supporting ===
==== Ju-ah's family ====
- Kim Seung-soo as Gong Jeong-han

Ju-ah's father, who is the head of the Gongmyeongjeongdae Clinic.

- Yoo Ho-jeong as Han Seong-mi

Ju-ah's mother, who is a psychiatrist.

- Choi Dae-chul as Gong Dae-han

Ju-ah's uncle, who is a rehabilitative therapist. He is Jeong-han's younger brother.

- Kim Sun-bin as Gong Woo-jae

Ju-ah's younger brother. He is a med school grad aiming for a modeling career.

- Kim Mi-sook as Na Seon-hae

Ju-ah's grandmother.

==== Hyun-bin's family ====
- Kim Hyung-mook as Yang Dong-ik

A Korean medicine doctor who wants to make Yangji Barun Clinic a well-known and modern Korean medicine brand, rather than focusing on traditional Korean medicine. He is Hyun-bin's father.

- So Yi-hyun as Cha Se-ri

Hyun-bin's stepmother, who is Dong-ik's second wife.

- Joo Jin-mo as Yang Seon-chul

Hyun-bin's grandfather, who is the founder of Yangji Barun Oriental Medicine Clinic.

- Jo Mi-ryung as Yang Dong-sook

Hyun-bin's aunt, who an oriental medicine clinic owner.

- Yoon Seo-ah as Yang Eun-bin

Hyun-bin's younger sister. She is a self-centred social media star who was spoiled since childhood; she always got what she wanted and had set her sights on Woo-jae.

==== Company and market people ====
- Han Seung-won as Park Jun-hyeok

Ju-ah's male friend.

- Kang Byul as Hwangbo Hye-soo

The only daughter of Taehan Group's chairman, she serves as vice president of the strategic planning division.

- Kim Min-ah as Oh Jin-ah
- Hong Jin-ki as Jeong Gi-beom

==== Others ====
- Jeong Ye-seo as Kim So-hye

A clothing designer at Taehan Group.

- Jeong Wook as Song Jae-geun

Seong-mi's classmate.

- Jo Yi-hyun as Min Ji-hoo

Dong-sook's son.

- Park Ri-won as Choi Min-seo

== Production ==
=== Development ===
Director Han Joon-seo, who is known for his work such as Beautiful Love, Wonderful Life (2019–2020) and The Real Has Come! (2023), is directing, and Park Ji-sook, who previously wrote The Tale of Lady Ok (2024–2025), wrote the screenplay. The series is produced by HB Entertainment.

=== Casting ===
In September 2025, Newsen reported that Jin Se-yeon and Park Ki-woong would star the weekend drama. The next month, Yoo Ho-jeong joined the cast. In November, according to Sports Chosun, So Yi-hyun, known for her acting in the daily drama Red Shoes (2021), was cast. By December 2025, the casting of Jin and Park as the leads was officially confirmed. The drama marks their reunion 14 years since Bridal Mask (2012). The same month, Kim Seung-soo, Yoo, Kim Hyung-mook, So, Kim Mi-sook, Joo Jin-mo, Choi Dae-chul, Jo Mi-ryung, Kim Sun-bin, Yoon Seo-ah, and Jeong Ye-seo were confirmed to appear.

=== Music ===
The first OST singer lineup, which includes Park Ji-hyeon, Song Ga-in, Jeon Yu-jin, and Jung Seo-joo was unveiled on January 29, 2026. Producer Son Dong-woon was attached for producing the OST. In April 2026, the second lineup, which includes Jang Minho, Kim Hee-jae, Jeong Dong-won, and Hongja was unveiled.

== Release ==
Recipe for Love is originally scheduled to premiere on KBS2 in February 2026, but was moved up to January 2026. In December 2025, a teaser poster was released, and the series confirmed its premiere on January 31, 2026, and will air every Saturday and Sunday at 20:00 (KST).

== Viewership ==
Recipe for Love : South Korea viewers per episode (millions)

Episodes	Episode number																								
Episodes	1	2	3	4	5	6	7	8	9	10	11	12	13	14	15	16	17	18	19	20	21	22	23	24	25
1–25	2.570	3.231	2.883	3.295	2.766	2.825	3.077	3.199	2.951	3.216	3.473	2.180	2.633	2.873	2.309	2.853	2.437	2.788	2.217	2.708	2.398	2.769	2.439	2.782	2.330
26–50	2.767	2.465	2.677	2.422	2.754	2.269	2.597	2.283	2.444	2.488	2.789	2.330	2.837	2.455	2.963	2.745	2.885	2.615	2.921	2.474	2.930	2.551	2.901	2.659	2.903

Source: Audience measurement performed nationwide by Nielsen Korea.

Average TV viewership ratings
Ep.	Original broadcast date	Average audience share	
Ep.	Original broadcast date	Nielsen Korea	
Ep.	Original broadcast date	Nationwide	Seoul
1	January 31, 2026	14.3% (1st)	12.8% (1st)
2	February 1, 2026	16.8% (1st)	15.7% (1st)
3	February 7, 2026	15.7% (1st)	14.7% (1st)
4	February 8, 2026	17.2% (1st)	16.4% (1st)
5	February 14, 2026	14.5% (1st)	13.3% (1st)
6	February 15, 2026	14.5% (1st)	13.8% (1st)
7	February 21, 2026	16.1% (1st)	15.0% (1st)
8	February 22, 2026	17.1% (1st)	16.1% (1st)
9	February 28, 2026	15.7% (1st)	14.5% (1st)
10	March 1, 2026	17.4% (1st)	15.9% (1st)
11	March 8, 2026	18.0% (1st)	17.1% (1st)
12	March 8, 2026	11.3% (2nd)	10.9% (2nd)
13	March 14, 2026	13.9% (1st)	12.3% (1st)
14	March 15, 2026	15.4% (1st)	13.6% (1st)
15	March 21, 2026	12.3% (1st)	10.7% (1st)
16	March 22, 2026	15.3% (1st)	13.7% (1st)
17	March 28, 2026	13.2% (1st)	12.0% (1st)
18	March 29, 2026	14.5% (1st)	13.0% (1st)
19	April 4, 2026	12.0% (1st)	10.4% (1st)
20	April 5, 2026	14.4% (1st)	12.7% (1st)
21	April 11, 2026	12.6% (1st)	11.6% (1st)
22	April 12, 2026	14.5% (1st)	13.0% (1st)
23	April 18, 2026	13.5% (1st)	12.2% (1st)
24	April 19, 2026	14.9% (1st)	13.1% (1st)
25	April 25, 2026	12.7% (1st)	11.1% (2nd)
26	April 26, 2026	14.9% (1st)	13.9% (1st)
27	May 2, 2026	13.3% (1st)	12.2% (1st)
28	May 3, 2026	14.7% (1st)	13.4% (1st)
29	May 9, 2026	12.9% (2nd)	11.3% (2nd)
30	May 10, 2026	14.3% (1st)	13.0% (1st)
31	May 16, 2026	12.5% (2nd)	10.7% (2nd)
32	May 17, 2026	13.9% (1st)	12.0% (1st)
33	May 23, 2026	12.3% (1st)	11.0% (1st)
34	May 24, 2026	13.2% (1st)	11.7% (1st)
35	May 30, 2026	13.3% (1st)	12.7% (1st)
36	May 31, 2026	15.0% (1st)	13.3% (1st)
37	June 6, 2026	13.1% (1st)	11.9% (1st)
38	June 7, 2026	15.1% (1st)	13.5% (1st)
39	June 13, 2026	13.7% (1st)	12.3% (1st)
40	June 14, 2026	15.9% (1st)	15.2% (1st)
41	June 20, 2026	15.1% (1st)	13.5% (1st)
42	June 21, 2026	15.9% (1st)	14.0% (1st)
43	June 27, 2026	14.4% (2nd)	12.9% (2nd)
44	June 28, 2026	15.9% (1st)	14.4% (1st)
45	July 4, 2026	13.6% (2nd)	12.1% (2nd)
46	July 5, 2026	15.5% (1st)	13.9% (1st)
47	July 11, 2026	14.1% (2nd)	12.9% (2nd)
48	July 12, 2026	15.5% (1st)	13.7% (1st)
49	July 18, 2026	14.5% (2nd)	12.9% (2nd)
50	July 19, 2026	15.3% (1st)	13.8% (1st)
Average		14.3%	13.2%
In the table above, the blue numbers represent the lowest ratings and the red numbers represent the highest ratings.
