= Choi Sang =

South Korean actor

- Born: Choi Min-Sung; January 1, 1987 (age 39); Seoul, South Korea
- Other names: Choi Min (2009–2024); Choi Sang (since 2024)
- Education: Apgujeong High School
- Occupation: Actor
- Years active: 2009–2024 (as Choi Min); 2024–present (as Choi Sang)
- Agent: HB Entertainment
- Height: 1.84 m (6 ft 1/2 in)

Korean name
- Hangul: 최상
- RR: Choe Sang
- MR: Ch'oe Sang

Former name
- Hangul: 최민
- RR: Choe Min
- MR: Ch'oe Min

Choi Sang (Korean: 최상; born January 1, 1987) is a South Korean actor. He is best known for his roles in My Bittersweet Life, My Dear Cat, and Cinderella with Four Knights. Previously known by the screen name Choi Min, he changed his screen name to Choi Sang beginning with his leading role in the KBS2 daily soap opera Cinderella Game in 2024.

== Filmography ==
=== Films ===
Year	Title	Role
2009	A Blood Pledge	Ki-ho
2012	Almost Che	Yook Jung-yeob

=== Television series ===
Year	Title	Role
2008	Here He Comes	Choi Min
2009	Heading to the Ground	Jo Byung-ki
2010	Pasta	Nemo
2010	Drama Special Series: "Rock, Rock, Rock"	Kim Jae-ki
2011	My Bittersweet Life	Choi Joon-young
2012	Drama Special Series: "Just an Ordinary Love Story"	Kwon Dae-woong
2012	My Lover, Madame Butterfly	Kim Baek-ki
2014	Pluto Secret Society	Teacher Ma
2014	My Dear Cat	Yoon Sung-il
2015	Super Daddy Yeol	Ryu Hyun-woo
2015	Yong-Pal	Choi Sung-Hoon (guest)
2015	Riders: Catch Tomorrow	Kang Yoon-jae
2015	Snow Lotus	Kang Tae-joo
2016	Cinderella with Four Knights	Lee Yoon-Sung
2022	Again My Life	Lee Yeon-seok
2024	Cinderella Game	Hwang Jin-goo

=== Music video appearances ===
Year	Song title	Artist
2007	"At The Supermarket"	RiRi Band
2009	"Touch Me"	Ivy
