= Enemies In-Law =

- International poster
- Directed by: Kim Jin-young
- Written by: Jo Joong-hoon
- Produced by: Lee Seo-yeol; Kim Sang-yoon
- Starring: Jin Se-yeon; Hong Jong-hyun
- Cinematography: Oh Jae-ho
- Edited by: Moon In-dae
- Music by: Kim Jong-cheon
- Production companies: The Pictures With a View; Enemies In-Law CIC
- Distributed by: Lotte Entertainment; Mains Entertainment
- Release date: April 29, 2015
- Running time: 119 minutes
- Country: South Korea
- Language: Korean
- Box office: US$3.2 million

Enemies In-Law (Korean: 위험한 상견례 2; RR: Wiheomhan sanggyeollye 2; lit. 'Dangerous Meeting of In-Laws 2') is a 2015 South Korean romantic comedy film directed by Kim Jin-young, starring Jin Se-yeon and Hong Jong-hyun.

It is a spin-off (or thematic sequel) to Meet the In-Laws (2011).

== Plot ==
Park Young-hee is a former national fencing athlete and currently a detective in the narcotics department. She also comes from a family of cops, from her soon-to-retire father to her siblings and their spouses. Han Chul-soo is the only son of two notorious criminals; his father steals cultural objects while his mother specializes in document forgery.

Chul-soo and Young-hee fall in love, but when the couple declares their intention to get married, both families disapprove. To placate Young-hee's father, Chul-soo promises that he will pass the police officer exam and become a detective like her. He spends the next seven years studying and preparing for the exam, with Young-hee by his side as supportive girlfriend.

As the exam date nears, Chul-soo's parents resort to desperate measures to sabotage the wedding and his future in the police force. Meanwhile, Young-hee and her family are ordered to investigate a serial murder case, and using his parents' expertise, Chul-soo helps with the case.

== Cast ==
- Jin Se-yeon as Park Young-hee
- Hong Jong-hyun as Han Chul-soo
- Shin Jung-geun as Han Dal-sik
- Jeon Soo-kyung as Jo Kang-ja
- Kim Eung-soo as Park Man-choon
- Park Doo-shik as Min-goo
- Park Eun-hye as Park Young-mi
- Kim Do-yeon as Park Young-sook
- Kim Sun-young as Teacher
- Jung Sung-hwa as Man using the urinal
- Kim Soo-mi as Granny selling rice cakes
- Lee Jun-hyeok as Delivery man

== Release ==
Enemies In-Law was released in theaters on April 29, 2015, and opened in third place at the box office. The film earned ₩1.60 billion (US$1.49 million) from 210,000 admissions in its first five days.
