= My Daughter the Flower =

2011–2012 South Korean TV series

- Promotional poster
- Also known as: My Daughter Kkotnim
- Hangul: 내 딸 꽃님이
- RR: Nae ttal Kkotnimi
- MR: Nae ttal Kkonnimi
- Genre: Soap opera Romance; Family
- Written by: Park Ye-kyung
- Directed by: Park Young-soo
- Starring: Jin Se-yeon; Jo Min-su; Park Sang-won; Lee Ji-hoon; Choi Jin-hyuk; Son Eun-seo
- Country of origin: South Korea
- Original language: Korean
- No. of episodes: 131

Production
- Production location: Korea
- Running time: 30 minutes on Mondays to Fridays at 19:20 (KST)

Original release
- Network: SBS TV
- Release: 14 November 2011 – 18 May 2012

My Daughter the Flower (Korean: 내 딸 꽃님이; lit. 'My Daughter Kkotnim') is a South Korean television drama series about a mother and daughter who are not blood related. The series aired on SBS TV from November 14, 2011 to May 18, 2012 on Mondays to Fridays at 19:20 with 131 episodes. It starred Jin Se-yeon, Jo Min-su, Park Sang-won, Choi Jin-hyuk, Lee Ji-hoon and Son Eun-seo.

== Synopsis ==
Yang Kkot-nim (kkotnim means "flower") is a therapist at a rehabilitation hospital. She is bright and brave, but highly emotional inside. Since her father died, Kkot-nim gets through life with her stepmother Jang Soon-ae, who is always there for her.

== Cast ==
- Jin Se-yeon as Yang Kkot-nim
- Jo Min-su as Jang Soon-ae
- Park Sang-won as Goo Jae-ho
- Choi Jin-hyuk as Goo Sang-hyuk
- Lee Ji-hoon as Eun Chae-wan
- Son Eun-seo as Eun Chae-kyung
- Baek Jong-min as Goo Joon-hyuk
- Kim Seung-hwan as Joo Yong-pil
- Oh Young-shil as Oh Mi-sook
- Kim Bo-mi as Joo Hong-dan
- Sunwoo Jae-duk as Yang Soo-chul
- Yoon So-jung as Moon Jung-ok
- Jung Joo-eun as Yoon Hye-jin
- Jung Kyu-soo as Eun Chun-man
- Lee Jong-nam as Heo Young-ae
- Lee Yu-ri (cameo)

== Awards ==
- 2011 SBS Drama Awards: New Star Award - Jin Se-yeon
