= Park Ri-won =

South Korean actress (born 1998)

- Born: August 20, 1998 (age 27); South Korea
- Occupation: Actress
- Years active: 2022–present
- Agent: Management Allum

Korean name
- Hangul: 박리원
- RR: Bak Riwon
- MR: Pak Riwŏn

Park Ri-won (Korean: 박리원; born August 20, 1998) also spelled as Park Li-won, is a South Korean actress under Management Allum. She made her acting debut in JTBC television series Nevertheless (2021). She is best known in Coupang Play series Unicorn (2022), True to Love (2023), and KBS2's daily drama Cinderella Game (2024–2025). She is a member of the co-ed group Monogram.

== Career ==
On December 22, 2021, Park had signed an exclusive contract with Daul Entertainment. In February 2026, Park signed an exclusive contract with Management Allum and appeared in KBS2's weekend drama Recipe for Love.

== Filmography ==
=== Film ===
Year	Title	Role	Ref.
2024	Dog Days	Ji-yeon	

=== Television series ===
Year	Title	Role	Ref.
2021	Nevertheless	Hyeon-u's student	
2022	Unicorn	Da-young	
2023	True to Love	Da-mi	
2023	O'PENing 2023 – "Shoot Me"	Joo-hyun	
2025	Cinderella Game	Yoon Se-young	
2026	Recipe for Love	Choi Min-seo	
