= My Bittersweet Life =

2011 South Korean television series

- Promotional poster
- Also known as: Women in Our House; Our Women
- Genre: Drama, Romance, Family
- Written by: Yoo Yoon-kyung
- Directed by: Jeon Chang-geun
- Starring: Jung Eun-chae; Jay Kim; Yoon A-jung; Choi Min-sung
- Country of origin: South Korea
- Original language: Korean
- No. of episodes: 125

Production
- Producer: Moon Bo-hyun
- Running time: 30 minutes

Original release
- Network: KBS1
- Release: May 16 – November 4, 2011

My Bittersweet Life (Korean: 우리집 여자들; RR: Urijip yeojadeul; lit. 'The Women of Our Home') is a South Korean television series starring Jung Eun-chae, Jay Kim, Yoon A-jung and Choi Min. It aired on KBS1 from May 16, 2011 to November 4, 2011 on Mondays to Fridays at 20:25 for 125 episodes.

== Synopsis ==
Go Eun-nim is a girl in her 20s who lives with her great-grandmother and grandmother. She barely managed to graduate from college and now struggles to find a job. Her father died when she was a child, then her mother ran away to marry another man. Eun-nim and Choi Joon-young grew up together; Eun-nim's grandmother had taken in Joon-young and his mother after seeing her suffer at the hands of her husband. Though they treat each other as siblings, Joon-young slowly begins to see Eun-nim as a woman. Eun-nim is cheery and energetic outside, but deep in her heart, her longing for her mother and loneliness grow stronger as time goes by. By chance, Eun-nim gets hired as an intern at an organic food company, Green Love. There, Eun-nim meets Lee Se-in, the third generation offspring of a conglomerate. As the heir of the business, Se-in studied in America and has looks, brains, and wealth; he is also selfish, spoiled and immature. Meanwhile, Hong Joo-mi is also the picture of perfection; proud, confident, beautiful, and unused to failure, Joo-mi went to the best schools and is now the youngest team leader at Chairman Lee's company. At first, Eun-mi and Se-in quarrel everyday over nothing and everything, but in the end, they fall in love with each other. But one day, her mother appears after all these years and asks Eun-nim to donate her bone marrow, to save the life of her son...

== Cast ==
=== Main characters ===
- Jung Eun-chae as Go Eun-nim
- Jay Kim as Lee Se-in
- Yoon A-jung as Hong Joo-mi
- Choi Min as Choi Joon-young

=== Supporting characters ===
Eun-nim's family

- Ban Hyo-jung as Kim Mal-nam
- Kim Young-ok as Choi Jung-ok
- Na Young-hee as Kim Jin-sook

Se-in's family

- Kim Sung-kyum as Chairman Lee
- Kim Byung-se as Cha Sung-joo
- Lee Hee-do as Lee Yong-ho
- Yang Hee-kyung as Heo In-ae
- Yoo So-young as Lee Se-ra

Joo-mi's family

- Lee Hye-sook as Geum Hwa-yeon
- Kang Nam-gil as Hong Kyu-man
- Choi Jae-won as Hong Kyu-young
- Kang So-ra as Hong Yoon-mi
- Choi Won-hong as Hong Jin

Extended cast

- Min Joon-hyun as Journalist Kim
- Choi Eun-suk as house owner
- Kim Do-yeon as Owner Kim
