= True to Love =

2023 South Korean television series

- Promotional poster
- Hangul: 보라! 데보라
- RR: Bora! Debora
- MR: Pora! Tebora
- Genre: Romantic comedy
- Written by: Ah Kyung
- Directed by: Lee Tae-gon; Seo Min-jeong
- Starring: Yoo In-na; Yoon Hyun-min; Joo Sang-wook; Hwang Chan-sung; Park So-jin
- Music by: Ha Geun-young
- Country of origin: South Korea
- Original language: Korean
- No. of episodes: 14

Production
- Executive producer: Kim Hyun-jung
- Producers: Lee Tae-gon; Lee Soo-yeon; Oh Nam-seok; Heo Min-ho
- Running time: 60 minutes
- Production companies: Good Wave, Inc.; Oz Arena

Original release
- Network: ENA
- Release: April 12 – May 25, 2023

True to Love, also known as Bo-ra! Debora (Korean: 보라! 데보라), is a 2023 South Korean television series starring Yoo In-na with Yoon Hyun-min, Joo Sang-wook, Hwang Chan-sung, and Park So-jin. It aired on ENA from April 12 to May 25, 2023, every Wednesday and Thursday at 21:00 (KST) for 14 episodes. It is also available for streaming on Amazon Prime Video in selected regions.

== Synopsis ==
Yeon Bo-ra is a successful love coach and influencer, whose pen name is Deborah. When her own love life is about to come full circle with an anticipated wedding proposal from her CEO boyfriend, she crosses paths with Lee Soo-hyuk, a publishing planner with a lacklustre love life. The two of them get off on the wrong foot, but become entangled when Soo-hyuk's publishing company wants to sign a deal for her next book, and Bo-ra discovers that her boyfriend is cheating on her.

== Cast ==
=== Main ===
- Yoo In-na as Yeon Bo-ra / Deborah (pen name): a dating influencer and a star author who has a best-selling romance novel.
- Yoon Hyun-min as Lee Soo-hyuk: a picky but charming publishing planner who is displeased with Bo-ra, but begins to change as he unexpectedly gets entangled with her.
- Joo Sang-wook as Han Sang-jin: Soo-hyuk's best friend and business partner who is the representative of the book publishing house Jinri.
- Hwang Chan-sung as Noh Joo-wan: Bo-ra's ex boyfriend who is the owner of a famous chicken franchise.
- Park So-jin as Lee Yoo-jeong: Bo-ra's best friend who is a lifestyle magazine feature editor.

=== Supporting ===
- Kim Ye-ji as Yeon Bo-mi: Bo-ra's younger sister.
- Koo Jun-hoe as Yang Jin-ho: an outgoing young man in his 20s who is good at sports, singing, and cooking.
- Lee Sang-woon as Yang Jin-woo: Yoo-jeong's husband who is the owner of a wine bar.
- Song Min-ji as Seo Su-jin: Sang-jin's ex-wife who is the editor-in-chief of a fashion magazine.
- Hong Hwa-yeon as Bang Woo-ri: an office assistant at Jinri.

=== Extended ===
- Kim Ji-an as Lim Yu-ri: Soo-hyuk's ex-girlfriend who is a radio writer.
- Park Ri-won as Da-mi

== Production ==
True to Love was first announced under the tentative title I'm Serious About Dating (Korean: 연애에 진심인 편; RR: yeonaee jinsimin pyeon) as one of ENA's 2023–2024 lineup through the "KT Group Media Day" in April 2022. Filming began in the summer of 2022.

== Ratings ==
Average TV viewership ratings
Ep.	Original broadcast date	Average audience share (Nielsen Korea)	
Ep.	Original broadcast date	Nationwide	Seoul
1	April 12, 2023	0.665% (43rd)	N/A
2	April 13, 2023	0.647% (36th)	N/A
3	April 19, 2023	0.769% (27th)	N/A
4	April 20, 2023	0.846% (20th)	N/A
5	April 26, 2023	1.118% (8th)	1.583% (4th)
6	April 27, 2023	0.946% (16th)	1.183% (9th)
7	May 3, 2023	0.987% (13th)	1.399% (6th)
8	May 4, 2023	1.194% (10th)	1.550% (6th)
9	May 10, 2023	0.687% (32nd)	N/A
10	May 11, 2023	1.008% (12th)	1.090% (8th)
11	May 17, 2023	0.748% (28th)	N/A
12	May 18, 2023	0.886% (16th)	N/A
13	May 24, 2023	0.870% (13th)	0.897% (10th)
14	May 25, 2023	0.964% (19th)	N/A
Average		0.881%	— (Note: Due to some unpublished ratings, the exact average rating is unknown.)
In the table above, the blue numbers represent the lowest ratings and the red numbers represent the highest ratings.; N/A denotes ratings that were not published.; This series aired on a cable channel/pay TV which normally has a relatively smaller audience compared to free-to-air TV/public broadcasters (KBS, SBS, MBC and EBS).
