= Jeon No-min =

South Korean actor (born 1966)

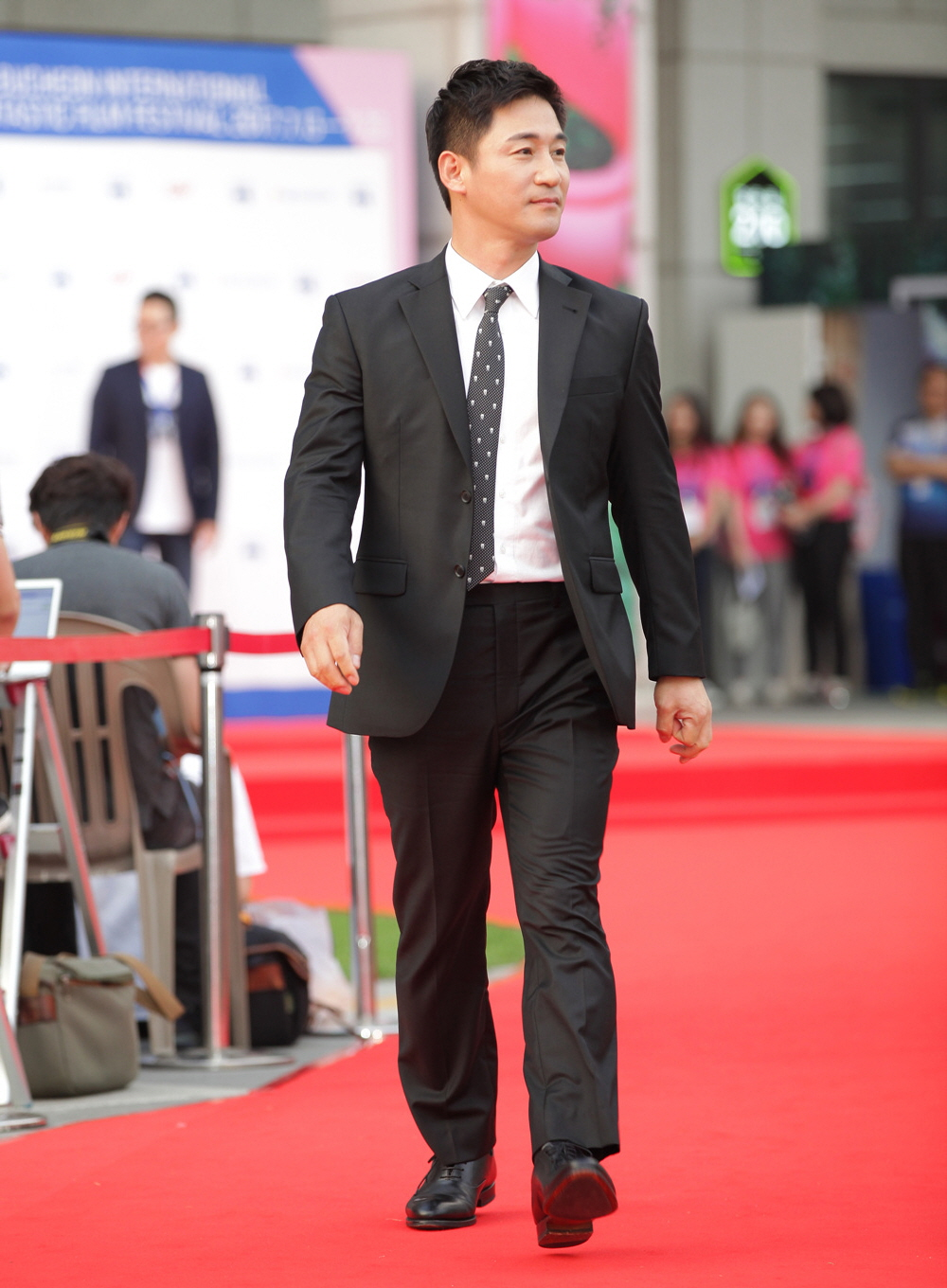
- Jeon at the Bucheon International Fantastic Film Festival, 2017
- Born: Jun Jae-yong; August 28, 1966 (age 60); Incheon, South Korea
- Education: Soonchunhyang University – English Language and Literature
- Occupation: Actor
- Agent: Lions Bridge Entertainment
- Spouse: Kim Bo-yeon (m. 2004; div. 2012)
- Children: 1

Korean name
- Hangul: 전재룡
- RR: Jeon Jaeryong
- MR: Chŏn Chaeryong

Stage name
- Hangul: 전노민
- RR: Jeon Nomin
- MR: Chŏn Nomin
- Website: junnomin.com

Jeon No-min (born Jun Jae-yong on August 28, 1966) is a South Korean actor. Among his recent roles were the villainous Hwarang warrior Seolwon in Queen Seondeok, and the fictional independence fighter Damsari in Bridal Mask.

== Filmography ==
=== Film ===
Year	Title	Role	Notes	Ref.
2003	The Circle			
2010	The Influence	Kim Woo-kyung, TV anchorman		
2011	Sin of a Family	Jeong In-su, the father		
2011	In Love and the War	North Korean soldier		
2014	Welcome	Gi Joo		

=== Television series ===
Year	Title	Role	Notes	Ref.
1997	Star in My Heart	[Support Role]		
1998	Sunflower	[Support Role]		
2002	My Name is Princess	Baek Min Soo		
2002	Let's Get Married	Kang Min Gi		
2003	A Saint and a Witch	Heo Se Jun		
2004	Island Village Teacher	[Lawyer]		
2006	Love and Ambition	[Support Role]		
2007	Bad Woman, Good Woman	Kim Tae-hyun		
2008	My Ex-Wife Lives Next Door	Kim Dae Sook		
2008	Strongest Chil Woo	Min Seung-guk		
2008	Family's Honor	Ha Soo Young		
2008	Amnok River Flows	Ahn Bong Geun		
2009	Queen Seondeok	Seolwon		
2011	Royal Family	Uhm Ki-do		
2011	Gyebaek	Sung-choong		
2011	Deep Rooted Tree	Jeong Do-kwang		
2011	Bachelor's Vegetable Store	Mok In-beom		
2012	God of War	General Moon Dae	Cameo	
2012	Love Again	Jung Seon-gyu		
2012	The Chaser	Seo Young-wook		
2012	Bridal Mask	Mok Damsari		
2012	Five Fingers	Kim Jung-wook		
2012	Seoyoung, My Daughter	[Magician]		
2012	The King's Doctor	Kang Do-joon		
2012	Cheongdam-dong Alice	Jang Myung Ho		
2013	Nine	Park Jung-woo		
2013	Hur Jun, The Original Story	King Seonjo		
2013	Love in Her Bag	Choi Soo-ho		
2013	Medical Top Team	Kim Tae Hyung		
2013	Principal Investigator – Save Wang Jo-hyun!	Joong Shik's father	KBS Drama Special	
2014	A Witch's Love	Kim Jeong-do	Cameo ( Ep. 1–2)	
2014	Two Mothers	Bae Chan-Sik		
2014	The Three Musketeers	Choi Myung-kil		
2014	A Mother's Choice	Oh Sung ll		
2015	More Than a Maid	Gook Yoo		
2015	Who Are You: School 2015	Director Gong Jae-ho		
2015	The Return of Hwang Geum-bok	Kang Tae-joong		
2015	Six Flying Dragons	Hong In-bang		
2016	Memory	Lee Chan-moo		
2016	Entertainer	Lee Joon-suk		
2016	Begin Again	Lee Tae Sung		
2017	Queen of the Ring	Mo Joong-hun		
2017	Ruler: Master of the Mask	Deputy Magistrate Han Kyu-ho		
2017	Hospital Ship	Kim Do-hoon		
2017	Witch at Court	Prosecutor Song		
2017	Oh, the Mysterious	Jin Jung Gil		
2017–2018	My Golden Life	Choi Jae-sung		
2018	Suits	Oh Byung-wook	Cameo ( Ep. 7)	
2018	Secrets and Lies	Shin Myung-joon		
2018	Risky Romance	Cha Jung-tae		
2019	Doctor John	Kang I-soo	Cameo	
2020	Itaewon Class	Do Joong-myung	Cameo (Ep. 11–12)	
2020	The King: Eternal Monarch	Captain Choi Gi-taek	Cameo (Ep. 4 & 6)	
2020	Live On	Eun-taek's father		
2021	Love (ft. Marriage and Divorce)	Park Hae-ryun		
2021	Joseon Exorcist	Lim Tae Mi		
2021	The One and Only	Gu Ji Pyo's Father		
2022	Yumi's Cells	Yoo Ba-bi's Father	Cameo	
2022	Kill Heel	Choi In-guk		
2022	The Law Cafe	Kim Seung-woon		
2022	Three Bold Siblings	Kim Myung-jae		
2023	Oasis	Hwang Chung-seong		
2023	Durian's Affair	Dan Chi-gang		
2023	The Third Marriage	Wang Jae Guk		
2023	Perfect Marriage Revenge	Han Ji-woong		

=== Variety show ===
Year	Title	Note
2007	Fraud Prevention Project	SBS

== Theater ==
Year	Title	Notes/Ref.
2010	추적	
2012	M. Butterfly	
2022	Linda and Joy as Story	

=== Director ===
Year	Title	Notes/Ref.
2022	Common Life	

== Awards and nominations ==
Name of the award ceremony, year presented, category, nominee of the award, and the result of the nomination
Award ceremony	Year	Category	Nominee / Work	Result	Ref.
Buil Film Awards	2010	Best Dressed	Jeon No-min	Won	
Korea Drama Awards	2017	Excellence Award, Actor	Ruler: Master of the Mask	Won	
Korean Culture and Entertainment Awards	2012	Excellence Award, Actor	Bridal Mask	Won	
MBC Drama Awards	2018	Best Supporting Actor in a Serial Drama	Secrets and Lies	Won	
SBS Drama Awards	2006	Best Supporting Actor in a Serial Drama	Love and Ambition	Won	
