= Kim Ji-hoon (actor, born 2000) =

South Korean singer and actor

- Born: 9 January 2000 (age 26); Daegu, South Korea
- Other name: Ji-hun
- Occupations: Singer; actor
- Agent: APR Entertainment
- Musical career
- Genres: K-pop
- Instrument: Vocals
- Years active: 2007–present
- Label: TS Entertainment
- Member of: BXB
- Formerly of: TRCNG

- Korean name
- Hangul: 김지훈
- RR: Gim Jihun
- MR: Kim Chihun

Kim Ji-hoon (born 9 January 2000), also known as Ji Hun, is a South Korean singer and actor. He is a member and leader of boy group BXB and a former member of TRCNG. He began his career as a child actor and in 2013 starred in the teen soap opera Melody of Love.

== Filmography ==
=== Television series ===
- True Story Red Eye (Y-Star, 2007) – young Dong-yeop
- A Life of Exploration (SBS, 2010)
- Dong Yi (MBC, 2010) – child of an aristocrat
- The Unlimited Show 1 (Tooniverse, 2011) – Joon-seok
- Glory Jane (KBS2, 2011) – young Seo In-woo
- Five Fingers (SBS, 2012) – young Yoo In-ha
- Ohlala Couple (KBS2, 2012) – young Jang Hyun-woo
- Samsaengi (KBS2, 2013) – young Park Dong-woo
- The Queen's Classroom (MBC, 2013) – Kim Tae-sung
- Melody of Love (KBS1, 2013) – Kim Sung-hoon
- Doctor Stranger (SBS, 2014) – young Lee Sung-hoon

=== Film ===
- Flashback (2008) – young Young-soo
- How to Live on Earth (2009) – Hoon
- House Family (short film, 2009) – son
- Bad Education (short film, 2010)
- Ghost Sweepers (2012) – Il-kwang
- Zambezia (animated, 2012) – Kai the Peregrine Falcon (Korean dubbing)
- 4:44 Seconds (TBA)

=== Web series ===
Year	Title	Role	Ref.
2022	Two Universes	Jae Hyuk	
