= Hyena (TV series) =

2020 South Korean television series

- Promotional poster
- Hangul: 하이에나
- RR: Haiena
- MR: Haiena
- Genre: Legal
- Developed by: KeyEast
- Written by: Kim Roo-ri
- Directed by: Jang Tae-yoo; Lee Chang-woo
- Starring: Kim Hye-soo; Ju Ji-hoon
- Composer: Jeon Chang-yeop
- Country of origin: South Korea
- Original language: Korean
- No. of episodes: 16

Production
- Producer: Jo Su-won
- Running time: 70 minutes
- Production company: KeyEast
- Budget: ₩15 billion

Original release
- Network: SBS TV; Netflix
- Release: February 21 – April 11, 2020

Hyena (Korean: 하이에나) is a 2020 South Korean television series starring Kim Hye-soo and Ju Ji-hoon. The series depicts the blood-soaked survival stories of lawyers representing the top 1% of the high-class elite. It aired on SBS TV from February 21 to April 11, 2020.

== Synopsis ==
Hyena deals with lawyers at Song & Kim who only work for the richest 1% of society. Jung Geum-ja is a swashbuckling lawyer who crosses the boundaries of law and lawlessness, justice and injustice, ethics and corruption. Armed with the strongest survival instincts, she is a true hyena that chases after money and success no matter what it takes. Yoon Hee-jae is her polar opposite rival. He is a pedigreed and elite lawyer who is confident in his abilities. He possesses a brilliant mind that is wrapped around his ego, but he lacks the grit of Geum-ja and gets outsmarted by her on many occasions.

== Cast ==
=== Main ===
- Kim Hye-soo as Jung Geum-ja
- Ju Ji-hoon as Yoon Hee-jae

=== Supporting ===
- Lee Geung-young as Song Pil-jung
- Kim Ho-jung as Kim Min-joo
- Park Soo-young as Jo Woo-suk
- Oh Yoon-hong as Baek Hee-joon
- Han Joon-woo as Kim Young-joon
- Moon Ye-won as Baek Woon-mi
- Jung Dong-geun as Choo Don-shik
- Hwang Bo-ra as Shim Yoo-mi
- Kim Ji-in as Tara
- Shim So-young as Park Hae-suk
- Jeon Seok-ho as Ga Gi-hyuk
- Lee Joo-yeon as Seo Jung-hwa

== Episodes ==
No.	Title	Directed by	Written by	Original release date
1	"Episode 1"	Jang Tae-yoo & Lee Chang-woo	Kim Roo-ri	21 February 2020
A mysterious woman who frequents his laundromat catches the attention of Yoon Hee-jae, who has just taken on a divorce case for a wealthy client.
2	"Episode 2"	Jang Tae-yoo & Lee Chang-woo	Kim Roo-ri	22 February 2020
While Hee-jae deals with office politics and the consequences of his oversight, Jung Geum-ja hustles to obtain more lucrative cases.
3	"Episode 3"	Jang Tae-yoo & Lee Chang-woo	Kim Roo-ri	28 February 2020
With Ha Chan-ho facing charges, Geum-ja sets out to uncover a critical piece of information that may sway the circumstances in her favor.
4	"Episode 4"	Jang Tae-yoo & Lee Chang-woo	Kim Roo-ri	29 February 2020
Geum-ja and Hee-jae go head-to-head over a world-class violinist who is desperate for freedom from an unfair contract.
5	"Episode 5"	Jang Tae-yoo & Lee Chang-woo	Kim Roo-ri	6 March 2020
Song Pil-jung makes a controversial hiring decision that stuns the firm. Geum-ja checks out the members of Hee-jae's team.
6	"Episode 6"	Jang Tae-yoo & Lee Chang-woo	Kim Roo-ri	7 March 2020
Geum-ja and Hee-jae have no choice but to join forces in getting to the truth of a case involving a company in trouble for a data breach.
7	"Episode 7"	Jang Tae-yoo & Lee Chang-woo	Kim Roo-ri	13 March 2020
Going up against what appears to be damning evidence against their client, Geum-ja and Hee-jae put a new strategy in motion.
8	"Episode 8"	Jang Tae-yoo & Lee Chang-woo	Kim Roo-ri	14 March 2020
Kim Min-joo returns to the firm. Hee-jae realizes he knows nothing about the real Geum-ja, who is forced to face a painful reminder of her past.
9	"Episode 9"	Jang Tae-yoo & Lee Chang-woo	Kim Roo-ri	20 March 2020
Geum-ja gets to know a suave new client who is looking for help with an acquisition. Hee-jae stumbles into a case representing a bratty kid.
10	"Episode 10"	Jang Tae-yoo & Lee Chang-woo	Kim Roo-ri	21 March 2020
Research for the case uncovers a connection to a religious cult. Meanwhile, the client's interest in Geum-ja sparks Hee-jae's jealousy.
11	"Episode 11"	Jang Tae-yoo & Lee Chang-woo	Kim Roo-ri	27 March 2020
Geum-ja returns to the cult leader with a menacing bargaining chip. Pil-jung blindsides Min-joo by asking Kevin Jung for a meeting.
12	"Episode 12"	Jang Tae-yoo & Lee Chang-woo	Kim Roo-ri	28 March 2020
After arriving at a grisly scene, Geum-ja tries to piece together what happened. Pil-jung has his own plan for handling the situation.
13	"Episode 13"	Jang Tae-yoo & Lee Chang-woo	Kim Roo-ri	3 April 2020
Hee-jae's father grapples with a devastating blow to his reputation. Geum-ja starts to understand who is really pulling the strings.
14	"Episode 14"	Jang Tae-yoo & Lee Chang-woo	Kim Roo-ri	4 April 2020
Ga Gi-hyeok gets his chance at making partner. After Geum-ja and Hee-jae face a disciplinary board, the firm takes things a step further.
15	"Episode 15"	Jang Tae-yoo & Lee Chang-woo	Kim Roo-ri	10 April 2020
Disguised as a couple, Geum-ja and Hee-jae scope out a hotel in search of evidence for Chan-ho's appeal. Pil-jung is called to court as a witness.
16	"Episode 16"	Jang Tae-yoo & Lee Chang-woo	Kim Roo-ri	11 April 2020
Doubling down on the case, the team locate the detective who handled the incident — and get their hands on the missing CCTV footage.

== Viewership ==
Hyena : South Korea viewers per episode (millions)

Season	Episode number																Average
Season	1	2	3	4	5	6	7	8	9	10	11	12	13	14	15	16	Average
1	1.931	1.758	2.054	2.071	2.071	2.098	2.020	2.632	2.212	2.265	2.065	2.229	1.815	2.197	2.150	2.789	2.147

Source: Audience measurement performed nationwide by Nielsen Korea.

Average TV viewership ratings
Ep.	Part	Original broadcast date	Average audience share	
Ep.	Part	Original broadcast date	Nielsen Korea	
Ep.	Part	Original broadcast date	Nationwide	Seoul
1	1	February 21, 2020	7.7% (13th)	7.9% (10th)
1	2	February 21, 2020	10.3% (6th)	10.9% (5th)
2	1	February 22, 2020	7.5% (17th)	8.1% (13th)
2	2	February 22, 2020	9.0% (8th)	9.4% (7th)
3	1	February 28, 2020	9.3% (10th)	10.3% (7th)
3	2	February 28, 2020	11.2% (6th)	12.1% (5th)
4	1	February 29, 2020	6.8% (17th)	7.7% (14th)
4	2	February 29, 2020	9.9% (8th)	11.1% (5th)
5	1	March 6, 2020	8.8% (8th)	9.7% (7th)
5	2	March 6, 2020	10.7% (4th)	11.8% (4th)
6	1	March 7, 2020	7.7% (13th)	8.9% (11th)
6	2	March 7, 2020	10.4% (8th)	11.7% (5th)
7	1	March 13, 2020	8.8% (10th)	9.9% (6th)
7	2	March 13, 2020	10.8% (4th)	11.7% (4th)
8	1	March 14, 2020	9.0% (6th)	10.3% (5th)
8	2	March 14, 2020	12.5% (3rd)	13.9% (3rd)
9	1	March 20, 2020	10.1% (7th)	11.5% (6th)
9	2	March 20, 2020	11.5% (4th)	13.0% (4th)
10	1	March 21, 2020	9.1% (7th)	10.2% (7th)
10	2	March 21, 2020	11.7% (5th)	12.8% (3rd)
11	1	March 27, 2020	9.4% (8th)	10.3% (7th)
11	2	March 27, 2020	10.8% (5th)	11.6% (5th)
12	1	March 28, 2020	8.4% (7th)	9.3% (6th)
12	2	March 28, 2020	10.8% (4th)	11.6% (4th)
13	1	April 3, 2020	9.7% (8th)	10.9% (5th)
13	2	April 3, 2020	10.6% (5th)	11.5% (4th)
14	1	April 4, 2020	9.5% (7th)	10.6% (6th)
14	2	April 4, 2020	11.3% (4th)	12.2% (3rd)
15	1	April 10, 2020	11.1% (5th)	12.2% (4th)
15	2	April 10, 2020	12.1% (4th)	13.2% (3rd)
16	1	April 11, 2020	10.7% (6th)	12.4% (4th)
16	2	April 11, 2020	14.6% (3rd)	16.5% (3rd)
Average			10.1%	11.1%
In the table above, the blue numbers represent the lowest ratings and the red numbers represent the highest ratings.

== Awards and nominations ==
Year	Award	Category	Recipient	Result	Ref.
2020	56th Baeksang Arts Awards	Best Drama	Hyena	Nominated	
2020	56th Baeksang Arts Awards	Best Actor	Ju Ji-hoon	Nominated	
2020	56th Baeksang Arts Awards	Best Actress	Kim Hye-soo	Nominated	
2020	56th Baeksang Arts Awards	Best Supporting Actor	Jeon Seok-ho	Nominated	
2020	56th Baeksang Arts Awards	Best Screenplay	Kim Roo-ri	Nominated	
2020	2nd Asia Contents Awards	Best Asian Drama	Hyena	Nominated	
2020	2nd Asia Contents Awards	Best Actress	Kim Hye-soo	Nominated	
2020	2nd Asia Contents Awards	Excellence Award	Kim Hye-soo	Won	
2020	SBS Drama Awards	Grand Prize (Daesang)	Kim Hye-soo	Nominated	
2020	SBS Drama Awards	Grand Prize (Daesang)	Ju Ji-hoon	Nominated	
2020	SBS Drama Awards	Top Excellence Award, Actor in a Miniseries Genre/Action Drama	Ju Ji-hoon	Won	
2020	SBS Drama Awards	Top Excellence Award, Actress in a Miniseries Genre/Action Drama	Kim Hye-soo	Nominated	
2020	SBS Drama Awards	Best Supporting Actress	Oh Kyung-hwa	Nominated	
2020	SBS Drama Awards	Best Supporting Team	Hyena	Nominated	
2020	SBS Drama Awards	Best Couple Award	Kim Hye-soo and Ju Ji-hoon	Nominated	

== Original soundtrack ==
Hyena OST

Soundtrack album by Various Artists
- Released: April 11, 2020
- Genres: Soundtrack, Pop
- Languages: Korean, English
- Label: Danal Entertainment / Genius

=== Track listings ===
No.	Title	Artist	Length
1.	"Hyena"	Yeoeun	3:37
2.	"On The Road"	Baekhyun	3:58
3.	"Dear My Love"	Ben	3:25
4.	"I Am You"	Jung Seung-hwan	3:57
5.	"Far Away"	Shin Ji-hoon	3:51
6.	"Today, Just Like Yesterday"	Hyojung	3:35
7.	"If We Can't See From Tomorrow"	Han Seung-woo	4:09
8.	"Hyena Opening Title"	Jeon Chang yeop, Angelo	2:51
9.	"Instinctive Woman"	Jeon Chang-yeop, Angelo	2:18
10.	"Never Give Up"	Jeon Chang-yeop, Angelo	2:52
11.	"Good Investigation"	Jeon Chang-yeop, Angelo	3:15
12.	"Hyena Ending Title"	Jeon Chang-yeop, Angelo	3:09
13.	"Bossa Party"	Jeon Chang-yeop, Ahn Soo-wan	2:59
14.	"BC Down"	Jeon Chang-yeop, Muzie	2:58
15.	"Stop Comic"	Jeon Chang-yeop, Muzie	1:51
16.	"I Know"	Jeon Chang-yeop, Muzie	2:49
17.	"Funky Blue"	Jeon Chang-yeop, Koo Ja-wan	3:29
18.	"After Dark"	Jeon Chang-yeop, Ahn Soo-wan	3:24
