= Dog Days (2024 film) =

2024 film by Kim Deok-min

- Theatrical release poster
- Hangul: 도그데이즈
- RR: Dogeu deijeu
- MR: Togŭ teijŭ
- Directed by: Kim Deok-min
- Screenplay by: Yoo Young-ah
- Starring: Youn Yuh-jung; Yoo Hae-jin; Kim Yun-jin; Jung Sung-hwa; Kim Seo-hyung; Daniel Henney; Lee Hyun-woo; Tang Jun-sang
- Cinematography: Kim Seong-ho
- Edited by: Kim Seon-min
- Music by: Hwang Sang-jun
- Production companies: CJ E&M; JK Film; Zion Entertainment
- Distributed by: CJ Entertainment
- Release date: February 7, 2024
- Running time: 120 minutes
- Country: South Korea
- Language: Korean
- Box office: US$2.7 million

Dog Days (Korean: 도그데이즈) is a 2024 South Korean comedy drama film directed by Kim Deok-min. The film has an ensemble cast, starring Youn Yuh-jung, Yoo Hae-jin, Kim Yun-jin, Jung Sung-hwa, Kim Seo-hyung, Daniel Henney, Lee Hyun-woo, and Tang Jun-sang. It was released theatrically on February 7, 2024.

== Plot ==
Min-sang is a single man with a clean-cut personality. His head hurts every day because of Jin-yeong, a tenant veterinarian who turns the building he bought with all his savings into a wasteland. Min-sang was bickering with Jin-yeong again one day when he meet an old woman with a quirky personality at the animal hospital, and she was none other than Min-seo, a world-renowned architect. Min-sang, who desperately needs help from Min-seo for an ongoing resort project, begins to target Jin-yeong and her pet dog "Chajang-nim" in order to approach Min-seo. Min-seo, who is suffering from angina, suddenly collapses on the street. Delivery driver Jin-woo finds her and saves her, but in the process, Min-seo loses her dog and only family member, "Wanda". Min-seo sets out to find Wanda with Jin-woo, and in the meantime, Wanda is discovered by Ji-yu, the adopted daughter of her neighborhood neighbors, composer Seon-yong and Jeong-ah. Meanwhile, band leader Hyeon, a junior of Seon-yong, is taking care of his girlfriend's dog "Sting" while she is away, and is shocked by the appearance of his girlfriend's ex-boyfriend Daniel, who claims to be Sting's father. The delightful newborn story of these people who became connected thanks to a special friend begins.

== Cast ==
- Youn Yuh-jung as Min-seo

Korea's representative architect with a prickly personality. She lives alone with her dog Wanda.

- Yoo Hae-jin as Min-sang

Owner of the animal hospital building. He is a person who hates dogs and bickers with Jin-yeong.

- Kim Yun-jin as Jeong-ah

Seon-yong's wife. A new mother who welcomes her long-awaited daughter through adoption.

- Jung Sung-hwa as Seon-yong

Jeong-ah's husband. A new father who welcomes his long-awaited daughter through adoption.

- Kim Seo-hyung as Jin-yeong

A tenant veterinarian who runs an animal hospital. She has an easy-going and humane personality and bickers with Min-sang.

- Daniel Henney as Daniel

He came to see his ex-girlfriend's pet dog, "Sting".

- Lee Hyun-woo as Hyeon

A clueless guitarist who takes on the responsibility of taking care of his long-distance girlfriend's pet dog, "Sting".

- Tang Jun-sang as Jin-woo

A young delivery driver who makes a living every day by sprinting through various part-time delivery jobs.

- Yoon Chae-na as Ji-yu

Jeong-ah and Seon-yong's daughter.

- Park Ri-won as Ji-yeon

A bassist.

=== Special appearance ===
- Kim Go-eun as Soo-jeong, Hyeon's girlfriend.
- Ryu Hye-rin as Nurse

== Production ==
=== Background ===
The film was originally scheduled to be released in late 2022 or 2023, but the release date was postponed to February 7, 2024. The time period of the movie is set in December 2020, and the film title Dog days means the hottest day of the year, as well as to metaphorically express difficult times.

Kim Seon-ho was originally cast in the role played by Lee Hyun-woo, but had to withdraw due to controversy over his private life at the time that was later rectified.

=== Filming ===
Principal photography began in December 2021 and ended in March 2022.

== Reception ==
=== Box office ===
As of March 16, 2024, Dog Days has grossed $2.7 million with a running total of 367,182 tickets sold.
