= Cinderella Game =

2024 South Korean television series

- Promotional poster
- Hangul: 신데렐라 게임
- RR: Sinderelra geim
- MR: Sinderella keim
- Genre: Melodrama; Revenge; Family; Thriller
- Written by: Oh Sang-hee
- Directed by: Lee Hyun-kyung
- Starring: Na Young-hee; Han Groo; Choi Sang; Ji Soo-won; Kim Hye-ok; Choi Jong-hwan; Park Ri-won; Kwon Do-hyung
- Music by: Choi In-hee
- Country of origin: South Korea
- Original language: Korean
- No. of episodes: 101

Production
- Executive producers: Park Ki-ho (CP); Choi Hyun-min; Joo Hyung-jin
- Producers: Kim Kyu-hyun; Seok Shin-ho; Im Ji-hyeon; Kim Nam-hee; Ahn Hyeong-jo
- Running time: 30 minutes
- Production companies: Miracle K Story; Jidam Media

Original release
- Network: KBS2
- Release: December 2, 2024 – April 25, 2025

Cinderella Game (Korean: 신데렐라 게임) is a 2025 South Korean television series starring Na Young-hee, Han Groo, Choi Sang, Ji Soo-won, Kim Hye-ok, Choi Jong-hwan, Park Ri-won, and Kwon Do-hyung. The series is about a woman who was used by a chairwoman as a fake daughter and seeks revenge for her wrongdoings. It aired on KBS2 from December 2, to April 25, 2025, every Monday to Friday at 19:50 (KST).

== Plot ==
Goo Ha-na, the eldest in her family, took on the role of breadwinner after her adoptive parents' death. She's shouldered numerous responsibilities, knowing nothing about her real parents. Then, Hwang Jin-goo claims someone might be her birth mother. Suddenly, Ha-na becomes an heiress, living a Cinderella-like life as Yoon Yu-jin, Se-young's cousin and enemy. Unbeknownst to her, she's being exploited as a fake daughter by Chairwoman Shin Yeo-jin, who orchestrated this Cinderella Game with Jin-goo's help. When the truth is revealed, Ha-na transforms into an avenger, seeking revenge against those who wronged her and caused her adoptive parents' death.

== Cast ==
=== Main ===
- Na Young-hee as Shin Yeo-jin

The chairwoman of Hyesung Group, who is a cold-blooded person. She lost daughter for many years ago. One day, she decides to use Ha-na.

- Han Groo as Goo Ha-na / Yoon Yu-jin / Lee Ha-na (Note: Lee Ha-na was a name when she was in the orphanage, while Goo Ha-na is her mostly used name when she was adopted into Goo's family, and Yoon Yu-jin is her name as a fake daughter.)
  - Kim Seo-hyun as young Ha-na

The head of a family who has many responsibilities. She is a tour guide and salesperson. One day, she unexpectedly became the chairwoman of Hyesung Group's lost daughter when the DNA result showed that they're biologically related. She truly believes that she is Yoon Yu-jin.

- Choi Sang as Hwang Jin-goo
  - Lee Chun-moo as young Jin-goo

The president of Hyesung Tour.

- Ji Soo-won as Choi Myung-ji

Se-young's mother.

- Kim Hye-ok as Sim Bang-ul

Jin-goo's mother and the Chairman Yeo-jin's housekeeper.

- Choi Jong-hwan as Han Yeon-bok

Yeo-jin's husband.

- Park Ri-won as Yoon Se-young
  - Yu Ha-yeon as young Se-young

The Hyesung Tour's head of product planning team under Hyesung Group.

- Kwon Do-hyung as Goo Ji-seok
  - Gu Hyun as young Ji-seok

The general manager of Hyesung Group, who wants to get his revenge on the chairwoman who caused her parents deaths. He is Ha-na's younger brother.

=== Supporting ===
==== People around Yeo-jin ====
- Lee So-yoon as Yoon Yu-jin
  - Lee So-yoon as young Yu-jin / Lee Du-na

Chairwoman Yeo-jin's daughter, who was gone missing when she was a child. She unexpectedly died when she was on the way to find her birth mother. She is Ha-na's best friend, or more like a sister.

==== People around Ha-na ====
- Park Chang-hoon as Goo Ji-chang

Ha-na's younger brother.

- Kim Ji-sung as Goo Ji-eun

Ha-na's younger sister.

- Kim Gun-woo as Lee Eun-chong

Du-na's son, who is being take care by her aunt, Ha-na.

==== Others ====
- Baek Seo-bin as Seok-gi

Ha-na's ex-boyfriend.

- Kim Hyun as Seok-gi's mother

Seok-gi's mother.

== Production ==
=== Development ===
Cinderella Game is written by Oh Sang-hee, who previously wrote Gracious Revenge (2019–2020) and directed by Lee Hyun-kyung, who previously directed Nothing Uncovered (2024). It is produced by Miracle K Story and Jidam Media.

=== Casting ===
Na Young-hee, Ji Soo-won, Kim Hye-ok, and Choi Jong-hwan reportedly confirmed their appearances on October 30, 2024. On the same day, actress Han Groo is reported to appear as the lead as reported by Joy News 24. The next day, Han, Choi Sang, Park Ri-won, and Kwon Do-hyung had been confirmed to appear as the main characters.

== Original soundtrack ==
=== Part 1 ===
Released on January 21, 2025
No.	Title	Lyrics	Music	Artist	Length
1.	"Nobody Knows"	RGBY1; RGBY2; RGBY3	RGBY1; RGBY2; RGBY3	Jin Yoon-hee	2:26
2.	"Nobody Knows" (Inst.)		RGBY1; RGBY2; RGBY3	Jin Yoon-hee	2:26
Total length:					4:52

=== Part 2 ===
Released on February 24, 2025
No.	Title	Lyrics	Music	Artist	Length
1.	"A Night Colored with You"	Baek Seung-jae	Baek Seung-jae	ZYON	3:35
2.	"A Night Colored with You" (Inst.)		Baek Seung-jae	ZYON	3:35
Total length:					7:10

=== Part 3 ===
Released on February 28, 2025
No.	Title	Lyrics	Music	Artist	Length
1.	"We are not apart"	N/A	N/A	Kim Yi-do	3:11
2.	"We are not apart" (Inst.)		N/A	Kim Yi-do	3:11
Total length:					6:22

=== Part 4 ===
Released on March 14, 2025
No.	Title	Lyrics	Music	Artist	Length
1.	"Tree"	N/A	N/A	Han Groo	3:47
2.	"Tree" (Inst.)		N/A	Han Groo	3:47
Total length:					7:34

=== Part 5 ===
Released on March 28, 2025
No.	Title	Lyrics	Music	Artist	Length
1.	"Heart to Heart"	N/A	N/A	Lee Ji-ham	3:21
2.	"Heart to Heart" (Inst.)		N/A	Lee Ji-ham	3:21
Total length:					6:42

=== Part 6 ===
Released on March 28, 2025
No.	Title	Lyrics	Music	Artist	Length
1.	"Remain in That Time"	N/A	N/A	Nahyun	3:30
2.	"Remain in That Time" (Inst.)		N/A	Nahyun	3:30
Total length:					7:00

== Release ==
Cinderella Game was scheduled to premiere on KBS2 on December 2, 2024, and would air every Monday to Friday at 19:50 (KST).

== Viewership ==
Cinderella Game : South Korea viewers per episode (millions)

Episodes	Episode number																								
Episodes	1	2	3	4	5	6	7	8	9	10	11	12	13	14	15	16	17	18	19	20	21	22	23	24	25
1–25	1.178	1.306	1.100	1.099	1.218	1.285	1.294	1.160	1.267	1.361	1.269	1.319	1.375	1.391	1.371	1.365	1.538	1.561	1.581	1.481	1.390	1.459	1.920	1.916	2.001
26–50	1.867	1.848	2.098	2.034	2.001	1.929	2.009	1.811	2.030	1.966	1.882	1.951	1.881	1.974	1.886	1.643	1.961	1.968	1.987	1.969	2.029	1.968	1.979	1.756	1.926
51–75	1.736	1.877	1.808	1.824	1.778	1.888	1.765	2.010	2.018	1.878	1.907	1.979	2.112	2.147	2.132	1.944	2.074	1.939	2.057	2.169	2.035	2.002	2.119	2.112	1.978
76–100	2.275	1.869	1.999	1.914	2.164	2.034	1.945	2.102	2.022	2.145	2.083	1.968	2.118	2.057	2.173	1.959	2.088	2.207	2.110	1.477	1.944	2.087	2.126	1.997	2.067
101	1.987	–																							

Source: Audience measurement performed nationwide by Nielsen Korea.

Average TV viewership ratings
Ep.	Original broadcast date	Average audience share	
Ep.	Original broadcast date	Nielsen Korea	
Ep.	Original broadcast date	Nationwide	Seoul
1	December 2, 2024	7.5% (4th)	6.5% (3rd)
2	December 3, 2024	8.1% (3rd)	6.8% (4th)
3	December 4, 2024	7.1% (4th)	6.0% (4th)
4	December 5, 2024	6.7% (5th)	5.8% (5th)
5	December 6, 2024	7.4% (4th)	6.1% (3rd)
6	December 9, 2024	8.1% (4th)	6.4% (4th)
7	December 10, 2024	7.9% (4th)	6.4% (4th)
8	December 11, 2024	7.3% (4th)	6.0% (4th)
9	December 12, 2024	7.9% (2nd)	6.1% (2nd)
10	December 13, 2024	7.9% (4th)	6.1% (5th)
11	December 16, 2024	7.8% (4th)	6.0% (4th)
12	December 17, 2024	8.5% (2nd)	6.9% (3rd)
13	December 18, 2024	8.7% (3rd)	7.4% (3rd)
14	December 19, 2024	8.5% (2nd)	7.1% (3rd)
15	December 20, 2024	8.6% (3rd)	7.2% (4th)
16	December 23, 2024	8.6% (3rd)	7.5% (3rd)
17	December 24, 2024	9.1% (2nd)	7.4% (3rd)
18	December 25, 2024	9.4% (3rd)	7.8% (3rd)
19	December 26, 2024	9.4% (2nd)	8.2% (3rd)
20	December 27, 2024	9.2% (3rd)	8.2% (3rd)
21	December 30, 2024	8.9% (2nd)	7.2% (3rd)
22	December 31, 2024	8.7% (2nd)	7.4% (3rd)
23	January 1, 2025	10.7% (2nd)	8.6% (3rd)
24	January 2, 2025	10.4% (2nd)	8.7% (3rd)
25	January 3, 2025	11.1% (2nd)	9.4% (2nd)
26	January 6, 2025	10.5% (2nd)	9.0% (2nd)
27	January 7, 2025	10.5% (2nd)	9.0% (3rd)
28	January 8, 2025	11.4% (2nd)	10.1% (2nd)
29	January 9, 2025	11.2% (2nd)	9.4% (3rd)
30	January 10, 2025	11.0% (2nd)	9.1% (3rd)
31	January 13, 2025	10.7% (2nd)	8.7% (3rd)
32	January 14, 2025	11.4% (2nd)	9.5% (3rd)
33	January 15, 2025	10.3% (1st)	8.5% (2nd)
34	January 16, 2025	11.2% (2nd)	9.7% (2nd)
35	January 17, 2025	10.8% (2nd)	9.2% (4th)
36	January 20, 2025	10.7% (2nd)	8.6% (3rd)
37	January 21, 2025	11.4% (2nd)	9.3% (2nd)
38	January 22, 2025	10.8% (2nd)	8.9% (2nd)
39	January 23, 2025	11.3% (2nd)	9.6% (2nd)
40	January 24, 2025	10.7% (3rd)	8.6% (4th)
41	January 27, 2025	8.8% (2nd)	8.0% (3rd)
42	January 30, 2025	10.5% (3rd)	8.8% (4th)
43	January 31, 2025	10.8% (2nd)	9.3% (2nd)
44	February 3, 2025	11.2% (2nd)	9.7% (2nd)
45	February 4, 2025	10.9% (2nd)	9.2% (2nd)
46	February 5, 2025	11.2% (2nd)	9.5% (3rd)
47	February 6, 2025	11.3% (2nd)	9.5% (2nd)
48	February 7, 2025	11.1% (2nd)	9.3% (3rd)
49	February 10, 2025	10.3% (2nd)	8.6% (3rd)
50	February 12, 2025	10.6% (2nd)	8.5% (3rd)
51	February 13, 2025	10.0% (2nd)	8.7% (3rd)
52	February 14, 2025	10.7% (3rd)	9.0% (3rd)
53	February 17, 2025	10.2% (2nd)	8.6% (3rd)
54	February 18, 2025	10.4% (2nd)	8.4% (2nd)
55	February 19, 2025	10.0% (2nd)	8.3% (2nd)
56	February 20, 2025	10.3% (2nd)	8.8% (2nd)
57	February 21, 2025	10.2% (2nd)	8.4% (3rd)
58	February 24, 2025	11.3% (2nd)	9.8% (2nd)
59	February 25, 2025	11.3% (2nd)	9.2% (2nd)
60	February 26, 2025	10.8% (2nd)	8.7% (2nd)
61	February 27, 2025	10.7% (2nd)	8.9% (2nd)
62	February 28, 2025	11.2% (2nd)	9.1% (2nd)
63	March 3, 2025	11.5% (2nd)	10.1% (2nd)
64	March 4, 2025	12.2% (2nd)	10.3% (2nd)
65	March 5, 2025	11.8% (2nd)	9.9% (2nd)
66	March 6, 2025	11.3% (2nd)	9.8% (2nd)
67	March 7, 2025	11.8% (2nd)	9.3% (2nd)
68	March 10, 2025	11.1% (2nd)	9.3% (2nd)
69	March 11, 2025	11.6% (2nd)	9.6% (2nd)
70	March 12, 2025	11.9% (2nd)	10.3% (2nd)
71	March 13, 2025	11.4% (2nd)	9.7% (2nd)
72	March 14, 2025	11.2% (2nd)	9.3% (2nd)
73	March 17, 2025	11.7% (2nd)	9.7% (2nd)
74	March 19, 2025	11.7% (2nd)	9.6% (2nd)
75	March 20, 2025	11.1% (3rd)	9.5% (3rd)
76	March 21, 2025	12.4% (2nd)	10.7% (3rd)
77	March 24, 2025	10.8% (2nd)	8.6% (2nd)
78	March 25, 2025	11.3% (3rd)	9.5% (3rd)
79	March 26, 2025	11.4% (1st)	9.0% (1st)
80	March 27, 2025	12.6% (1st)	10.6% (1st)
81	March 28, 2025	11.3% (3rd)	9.0% (3rd)
82	March 31, 2025	11.0% (2nd)	9.6% (2nd)
83	April 1, 2025	12.2% (2nd)	9.7% (2nd)
84	April 2, 2025	11.4% (2nd)	9.5% (2nd)
85	April 3, 2025	12.1% (2nd)	10.2% (2nd)
86	April 4, 2025	11.7% (2nd)	10.1% (2nd)
87	April 7, 2025	11.7% (2nd)	10.0% (2nd)
88	April 8, 2025	11.8% (2nd)	9.9% (2nd)
89	April 9, 2025	11.9% (1st)	10.5% (1st)
90	April 10, 2025	12.1% (1st)	10.7% (1st)
91	April 11, 2025	11.0% (2nd)	9.0% (2nd)
92	April 14, 2025	11.8% (2nd)	10.3% (2nd)
93	April 15, 2025	12.0% (1st)	10.7% (1st)
94	April 16, 2025	11.8% (1st)	9.8% (2nd)
95	April 17, 2025	8.6% (2nd)	7.5% (2nd)
96	April 18, 2025	10.9% (1st)	9.4% (1st)
97	April 21, 2025	11.6% (2nd)	10.1% (2nd)
98	April 22, 2025	12.0% (2nd)	10.3% (2nd)
99	April 23, 2025	11.2% (2nd)	9.5% (2nd)
100	April 24, 2025	11.9% (1st)	10.5% (1st)
101	April 25, 2025	10.8% (1st)	8.9% (2nd)
Average		10.5%	8.9%
In the table above, the blue numbers represent the lowest ratings and the red numbers represent the highest ratings.
