= Kim Sun-bin (actor) =

South Korean actor (born 2001)

- Born: May 7, 2001 (age 24); South Korea
- Occupation: Actor
- Years active: 2020–present
- Agents: Major9; Golden Moon

Korean name
- Hangul: 김선빈
- RR: Gim Seonbin
- MR: Kim Sŏnbin
- Website: goldenmoon.co.kr/actors/kim-sun-bin/

Kim Sun-bin (Korean: 김선빈; born May 7, 2001) is a South Korean actor under Golden Moon. He made his acting debut in 2020, and is best known for his roles in historical dramas Korea–Khitan War (2023–2024) and The Haunted Palace (2025).

== Career ==
Kim made his acting debut in the web series Let Me Off the Earth (2020) as Yeongjun. In 2022, Kim signed an exclusive contract with Major9. He then had his first leading role in the web series New Love Playlist (2022), and was also later cast in the 2022 KBS Drama Special: Prism as the lead. In 2023, Kim was cast in Korea–Khitan War (2023–2024) as Choe Chung, marking his historical drama debut. In 2024, Kim signed with Golden Moon and has appeared in two dramas, Coupang Play's Cinderella at 2 AM (2024) and JTBC's historical drama The Tale of Lady Ok (2024–2025). Kim won his first Best New Actor Award for portraying Choi Chung in Korea–Khitan War at the 6th Daejeon Special FX Festival's DFX OTT Awards, which was held on September 21, 2024. In 2025, Kim has been cast in the SBS TV's romantic fantasy historical drama The Haunted Palace. He then joined the cast for the 2026 KBS2 weekend drama Recipe for Love.

== Filmography ==
=== Television series ===
Year	Title	Role	Ref.
2022	KBS Drama Special: Prism	Go Tae-jun	
2023	The Good Bad Mother	Kang-ho's classmate	
2023	Numbers	Gong Hee-sam	
2023	Not Others	Baek Gun	
2023–2024	Korea–Khitan War	Choe Chung	
2024	Cinderella at 2 AM	Unknown	
2024–2025	The Tale of Lady Ok	Baek Do-gwang	
2025	The Haunted Palace	Prince Yeong-in	
2026	No Tail to Tell	Unknown	
2026	The Judge Returns	Hwang Tae-seong	
2026	Recipe for Love	Gong Woo-jae	

=== Web series ===
Year	Title	Role	Note(s)	Ref.
2020	Let Me Off the Earth	Yeongjun	Acting debut	
2022	New Love Playlist	Kim Yu-jin		

== Awards and nominations ==
Name of the award ceremony, year presented, category, nominee of the award, and the result of the nomination
Award ceremony	Year	Category	Nominee / Work	Result	Ref.
DFX OTT Awards	2024	Best New Actor	Korea-Khitan War	Won	
