= Bridal Mask =

2012 South Korean television series

- Promotional poster
- Hangul: 각시탈
- RR: Gaksital
- MR: Kaksit'al
- Genre: Romance; Action; Period drama
- Based on: Gaksital by Huh Young-man
- Written by: Yoo Hyun-mi
- Directed by: Yoon Sung-sik
- Starring: Joo Won; Jin Se-yeon; Park Ki-woong; Han Chae-ah
- Composer: Gaemi
- Country of origin: South Korea
- Original language: Korean
- No. of episodes: 28

Production
- Executive producer: Lee Gun-joon
- Production location: South Korea
- Production companies: Bridal Mask SPC; Pan Entertainment; KBS N

Original release
- Network: KBS2
- Release: 30 May – 6 September 2012

Bridal Mask (Korean: 각시탈) is a 2012 KBS2 period drama based on the popular Korean manhwa by Huh Young-man. Set in Seoul, Korea, during the 1930s Japanese colonial era, the story follows a man named Lee Kang-to, a Korean police officer commissioned by the Japanese Police to betray his own country and aid the Japanese in the annihilation of the Korean rebellion. It stars Joo Won, Jin Se-yeon, Park Ki-woong and Shin Hyun-joon.

== Synopsis ==
In the 1930s, Lee Kang-to lives in Korea, which is oppressed under Imperial Japanese rule. Despite being Korean, he works with the Japanese police in order to capture "Bridal Mask," a mysterious rebel who fights for Korean independence. Later, he secretly dons the Bridal Mask and fights the unjust Japanese regime. He struggles to balance his personal facade as a Japanese police officer and his private life as Bridal Mask.

Kimura Shunji is a gentle Japanese schoolteacher. He is best friends with Kang-to and falls in love with the fiercely patriotic Mok-dan. His hatred for Bridal Mask and unrequited love for Mok-dan twists him into a darker person.

== Cast ==
=== Main ===
- Joo Won as Lee Kang-to/Sato Hiroshi/Lee Young (childhood name)

A pro-Japanese Korean police officer. He is despised by his fellow countrymen for being a traitor to his homeland. Later, he secretly becomes the masked vigilante known as Gaksital (Bridal Mask) and fights for Korea's independence using his skills in Martial arts (Taekkyon). He actually is the second Gaksital as his brother was the original one.

- Jin Se-yeon as Oh Mok-dan/Esther/Boon-yi (childhood name)

A fiercely patriotic Korean woman. Her father is Damsari, an important general of the Independence army. She loves Gaksital and hates Kang-to, unaware that they are the same person.

- Park Ki-woong as Kimura Shunji

Although he is born into a prominent Samurai family, Shunji defies his father and becomes a music teacher for Korean children. After his brother Kenji's death, he becomes the head of the Japanese Police Force and vows to kill Gaksital, unaware that it is his best friend Kang-to. He has an unrequited love for Mok-dan.

- Han Chae-ah as Ueno Rie/Lara/Chae Hong-joo

A Korean woman whose aristocratic family was murdered by the Independence army. Orphaned, she voluntarily becomes a "gisaeng" but was adopted by a prominent Japanese man. She returns to Korea on a mission to kill Gaksital, but she inadvertently falls in love with Lee Kang-to.

- Shin Hyun-joon as Lee Kang-san/Lee In (childhood name)

Kang-to's older brother. He is tortured by the Japanese police for joining the Independence movement and is rendered mentally ill. Considered as a disgrace and burden to a family by Lee Kang-to, Kang-to takes little interest in his brother. It is later revealed that he is the original Gaksital and he has been pretending to be mentally ill the whole time. Kang-to accidentally kills him not knowing he is his brother. His death causes Kang-to to succeed his brother as Gaksital.

=== Supporting ===
- Chun Ho-jin - Kimura Taro (Father of Shunji; Chief of the Jongro police station, Chairman of Gyeongseong branch of Kishokai)
- Jeon No-min - Mok Damsari (Mok-dan's father and the General of the Independence Army)
- Son Byong-ho - Circus Master Jo Dong-ju (Leader of the Circus team)
- Song Ok-sook - Mrs. Han (Kang-to's mother)
- Lee Il-jae - Lee Seon (Kang-to's father)
- Ahn Hyung-joon - Katsuyama Jun (Chae Hong-joo's bodyguard)
- Lee Byung-joon - Shin Nan-da (Circus member)
- Song Min-Hyung - Wada Ryo (Executor)
- Ahn Suk-hwan - Lee Shi-yong (Royal Count, Kishokai member)
- Kim Jung-nan - Lee Hwa-gyung (Royal Countess, Kishokai member)
- Lee Kyung-shil - Oh Dong-nyeon (Widowed circus member who regards Mok-dan as her own daughter)
- Kim Tae-young - Park In-sam (Kyeongseong Ilbo newspaper owner, Kishokai member)
- Son Yeo-eun - Um Sun-hwa (Mok-dan's best friend, Circus member)
- Seo Yun-a - Ham Gye-soon (Circus member and Shunji's spy)
- Park Joo-hyung - Kimura Kenji (Former Captain of Jongro police station, Kishokai member)
- Jeon Gook-hwan - Ueno Hideki (Chairman of Kishokai, a secret organization involved in the assassinations of the last Emperor and Empress of Joseon, adopted father of Chae Hong-joo)
- Bruce Khan - Ginpei Gato (Chairman Ueno's samurai bodyguard)
- Kim Eung-soo - Konno Goji (Director of the Kyeongseong police force)
- Yoon Jin-ho - Goiso Tadanobu (Sergeant of Jongro police station)
- Yoon Bong-kil - Abe Shinji (Private of Jongro police station)
- Ban Min-jung - Jeok Pa/Anna (Comrade of Damsari)
- Ji Seo-yun - Tasha (Owner of Angel Club)
- Baek Jae-jin - Director Bong (Manager of Angel Club)
- Choi Dae-hoon - Lee Hae-suk/Minami Tamao (Count's son, Kishokai member)
- Bang Joong-hyun - Park Sung-mo (Newspaper owner's son, Kishokai member after replacing his father, In-sam)
- Jang Joon-yoo - Merry
- Lee Jae-won - No Sang-yeob
- Kim Kyu-chul - Woo Byung-joon (Hospital director, Kishokai member)
- Ko In-beom - Jo Young-geun (President of Jo Il Bank, Kishokai member)
- Kwon Tae-won - Choi Myung-sub (Judge, Kishokai member)
- Kim Bang-won - Kim Deuk-soo (Member of Dong Jin's Death Squad)
- Jeon Hyun - Baek Gun (Subordinate of Kang-to's father)
- Kim Myung-gon - Yang-baek (Leader of Korean Freedom Fighters)
- Park Sung-woong - Dong-jin (Leader of Dong-jin's Death Squad)
- Park Bo-gum - Han Min-gyu (Gye-soon's Younger Brother)

== Production accident ==
The drama was originally expected to air on May 9, 2012 but a bus accident resulting in the death of a stunt double and serious injuries of other crew members caused delays in production. On the last episode that aired on September 6, 2012, KBS sent out a formal apology message towards the relatives of the victims and friends.

== Ratings ==
Ep.	Original broadcast date	Average audience share			
Ep.	Original broadcast date	TNmS Ratings		AGB Nielsen	
Ep.	Original broadcast date	Nationwide	Seoul	Nationwide	Seoul
1	30 May 2012	12.6%	12.8%	12.7%	13.3%
2	31 May 2012	12.4%	13.3%	12.4%	12.9%
3	6 June 2012	13.3%	14.5%	13.6%	13.9%
4	7 June 2012	14.8%	14.9%	15.6%	16.7%
5	13 June 2012	13.8%	14.1%	14.5%	15.4%
6	14 June 2012	15.5%	16.3%	15.0%	15.7%
7	20 June 2012	15.3%	15.5%	15.5%	16.5%
8	21 June 2012	15.4%	15.0%	15.5%	16.3%
9	27 June 2012	14.7%	13.9%	14.8%	15.2%
10	28 June 2012	15.9%	15.3%	14.6%	15.0%
11	4 July 2012	17.6%	17.2%	14.8%	15.8%
12	5 July 2012	16.5%	15.6%	14.0%	14.0%
13	11 July 2012	16.7%	15.6%	14.4%	14.4%
14	12 July 2012	17.3%	16.3%	16.3%	17.5%
15	18 July 2012	17.2%	16.8%	15.2%	16.7%
16	19 July 2012	18.1%	17.3%	16.8%	18.2%
17	25 July 2012	16.7%	16.8%	15.6%	16.3%
18	1 August 2012	16.9%	16.3%	18.0%	18.2%
19	8 August 2012	19.3%	18.8%	18.3%	18.2%
20	9 August 2012	20.6%	20.6%	19.5%	19.8%
21	15 August 2012	22.6%	23.1%	19.4%	18.8%
22	16 August 2012	21.9%	22.4%	19.7%	19.5%
23	22 August 2012	22.2%	22.4%	19.8%	19.5%
24	23 August 2012	22.3%	22.9%	20.3%	20.2%
25	29 August 2012	19.4%	19.4%	20.4%	20.6%
26	30 August 2012	22.8%	22.9%	21.4%	21.7%
27	5 September 2012	24.3%	26.1%	21.5%	21.9%
28	6 September 2012	27.3%	27.7%	22.9%	23.2%
Average		18.0%	18.0%	16.9%	17.3%

Sources: TNmS Media Korea, AGB Nielsen Korea

== Awards and nominations ==
Year	Award	Category	Recipient	Result
2012
2012	20th Korean Culture and Entertainment Awards	Best Drama	Bridal Mask	Nominated
2012	20th Korean Culture and Entertainment Awards	Best Drama PD	Yoon Sung-sik	Nominated
2012	20th Korean Culture and Entertainment Awards	Top Excellence Award, Actor	Joo Won	Nominated
2012	20th Korean Culture and Entertainment Awards	Excellence Award, Actor	Kim Eung-soo	Won
2012	20th Korean Culture and Entertainment Awards	Excellence Award, Actor	Lee Byung-joon	Nominated
2012	20th Korean Culture and Entertainment Awards	Excellence Award, Actor	Jeon No-min	Won
2012	20th Korean Culture and Entertainment Awards	Best Supporting Actor	Park Ki-woong	Nominated
2012	20th Korean Culture and Entertainment Awards	Best New Actress	Han Chae-ah	Nominated
2012	20th Korean Culture and Entertainment Awards	Best New Actress	Jin Se-yeon	Nominated
2012	20th Korean Culture and Entertainment Awards	Best New Actress	Ban Min-jung	Won
2012	1st K-Drama Star Awards	Excellence Award, Actor	Joo Won	Nominated
2012	1st K-Drama Star Awards	Acting Award, Actress	Jin Se-yeon	Nominated
2012	1st K-Drama Star Awards	Best Action Stunts	Bridal Mask	Won
2012	KBS Drama Awards	Top Excellence Award, Actor	Joo Won	Nominated
2012	KBS Drama Awards	Top Excellence Award, Actor	Chun Ho-jin	Nominated
2012	KBS Drama Awards	Excellence Award, Actor in a Serial Drama	Joo Won	Won
2012	KBS Drama Awards	Excellence Award, Actor in a Serial Drama	Chun Ho-jin	Nominated
2012	KBS Drama Awards	Excellence Award, Actress in a Serial Drama	Jin Se-yeon	Nominated
2012	KBS Drama Awards	Excellence Award, Actress in a Serial Drama	Han Chae-ah	Nominated
2012	KBS Drama Awards	Best New Actress	Jin Se-yeon	Won
2012	KBS Drama Awards	Best Supporting Actor	Park Ki-woong	Won
2012	KBS Drama Awards	Best Supporting Actress	Kim Jung-nan	Nominated
2012	KBS Drama Awards	Best Young Actor	Kim Woo-suk	Nominated
2012	KBS Drama Awards	Best Young Actress	Kim Hyun-soo	Nominated
2012	KBS Drama Awards	Best Couple Award	Joo Won and Park Ki-woong	Nominated
2012	KBS Drama Awards	Best Couple Award	Joo Won and Jin Se-yeon	Nominated
2012	KBS Drama Awards	Popularity Award	Joo Won	Won
2013	13th Republic of Korea National Assembly Awards	Drama of the Year	Bridal Mask	Won

== International broadcast ==
- Algeria : It aired on DTV starting August 2016, dubbed into Arabic as قناع العروس (Qinā' al-'Arūs).
- Thailand It aired on Workpoint TV beginning January 13, 2015, dubbed as Nakak Peesaj. ("หน้ากากปีศาจ", literally: Devil Mask).
- Philippines It aired on UNTV on This 2021
- Indonesia It aired on B-Channel beginning February 13, 2013, dubbed as Bridal Mask.

== See also ==
- Japanese occupation of Korea
- Korean independence movement
- Taekkyon
