= Ju Ji-hoon =

South Korean actor and model (born 1982)

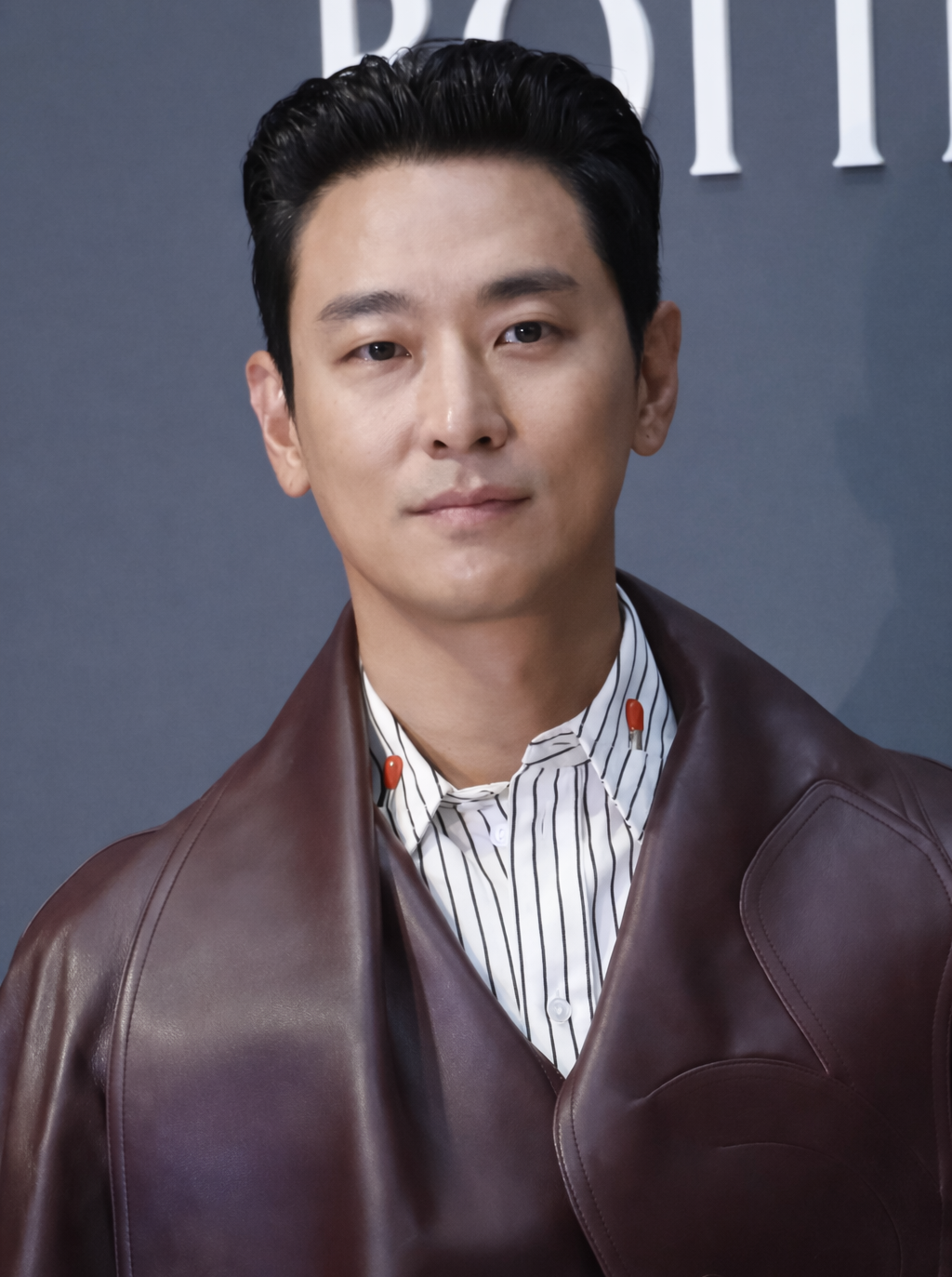
- Ju in February 2025
- Born: May 16, 1982 (age 44); Seoul, South Korea
- Education: Kyonggi University
- Occupations: Actor; model
- Years active: 2003–present
- Agent: Blitzway Entertainment

Korean name
- Hangul: 주지훈
- RR: Ju Jihun
- MR: Chu Chihun

Signature
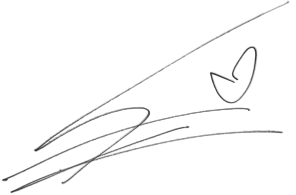

Ju Ji-hoon (Korean: 주지훈; born May 16, 1982) is a South Korean actor and model. He first gained international recognition with his leading role in the television series Princess Hours (2006) and has achieved further prominence with the series Five Fingers (2013), Mask (2015), Kingdom (2019–2020), Hyena (2020), and The Trauma Code: Heroes on Call (2025), for which he won Best Actor at the 61st Baeksang Arts Awards. Ju has also garnered acclaim for his performances in the films Asura: The City of Madness (2016), Along with the Gods: The Two Worlds (2017) and its 2018 sequel, The Spy Gone North (2018), and Dark Figure of Crime (2018).

== Early life ==
Ju Ji-hoon was born on May 16, 1982, on Gangdong District, Seoul, South Korea. He graduated with a degree in Acting from Kyonggi University.

== Career ==
=== 2003–2008: Acting debut and recognition ===
In 2003, Ju debuted as a model, in advertisements for clothing brands such as Calvin Klein, Levi's and Reebok. He had various bit parts in television dramas, but it was in 2006's romantic comedy Princess Hours, based on the manhwa Goong, that he achieved breakthrough. The drama was a hit domestically with a peak rating of 28.3%, and internationally across Asia, catapulting Ju into Korean Wave stardom. He won the Best New Actor award at the MBC Drama Awards along with his co-star Yoon Eun-hye.

In March 2007, Ju starred in KBS2's revenge drama Lucifer, opposite Uhm Tae-woong and Shin Min-a. The same month, he received the New Asian Star award at the 1st Astar TV Drama Awards for his performance in Princess Hours and Lucifer.

Ju's film debut was in Antique (2008), based on the manga Antique Bakery. The film was invited to the 59th Berlin International Film Festival. He then reunited with Lucifer co-star Shin Min-a in the romantic comedy The Naked Kitchen.

=== 2009–2017: Military enlistment and comeback ===
In January 2011, ahead of Ju's military discharge in November, he signed with entertainment agency KeyEast, owned by actor Bae Yong-joon.

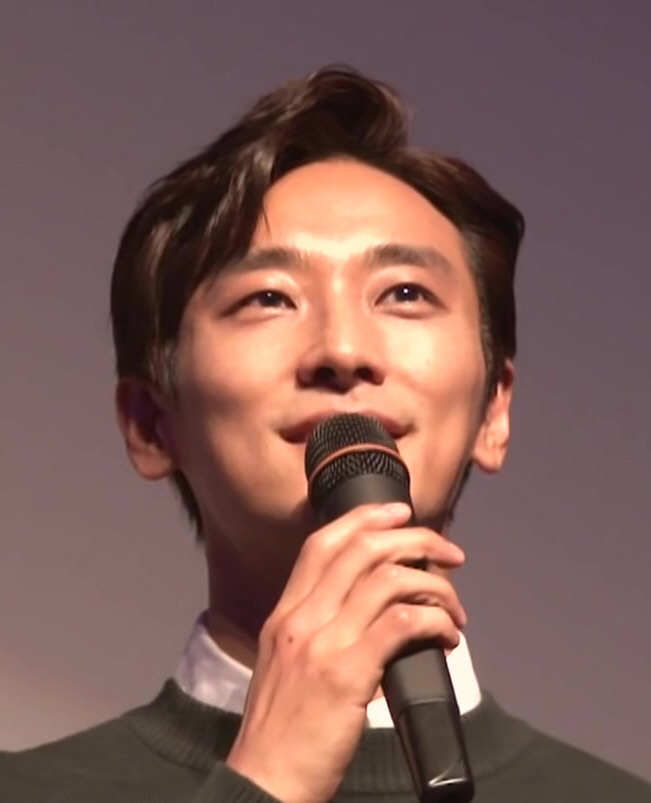
Ju in 2015

In August 2012, Ju made his comeback in the period comedy film I Am the King. Inspired by the popular novel The Prince and the Pauper, Ju played the dual role of Grand Prince Choong-nyung and the slave Deok-chil, in a fictional period before the prince becomes King Sejong the Great. This was followed by his starring role as a pianist in the melodrama Five Fingers, broadcast from August to November 2012. Ju also starred in medical drama Medical Top Team, and romantic comedy film Marriage Blue.

Ju made his film debut in China with Love Suspicion, a romantic thriller. In 2014, Ju was paired up with Ji Sung and Lee Kwang-soo in Confession, a neo-noir film that brutally explores the aftermath of three men's friendship after the death of one's mother.

In 2015, Ju starred in the period film The Treacherous, reuniting him with the director of Antique and Naked Kitchen. He then made his small screen comeback with SBS' melodrama Mask alongside Soo Ae.

In 2016, Ju starred in the noir crime thriller Asura: The City of Madness, which premiered globally at the 41st Toronto Film Festival. He received the Popular Film Star award at the Korea Top Star Awards.

=== 2018–present: Career resurgence ===
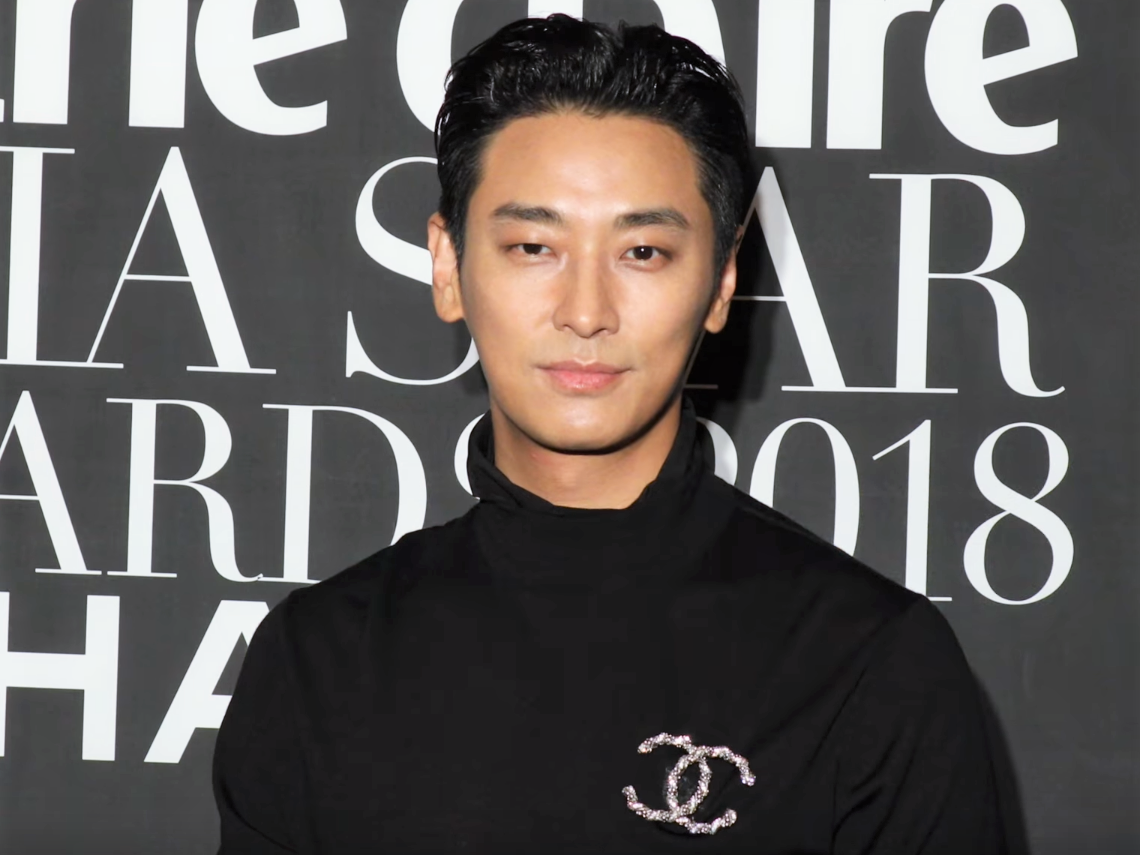
Ju in October 2018

From 2017 to 2018, Ju starred in the two-part fantasy epic Along with the Gods: The Two Worlds. The film was the second highest grossing film in South Korea, and Ju became known for his role as Haewonmaek.

In 2018, Ju starred in the thriller films The Spy Gone North, and Dark Figure of Crime. Ju's performance in both films earned acclaim, and he won several Best Supporting Actor awards at film ceremonies for his performance in The Spy Gone North, and was nominated for Best Actor at the Blue Dragon Awards for Dark Figure of Crime.

In 2019, Ju made a comeback to the small screen with two television series; Netflix's zombie period drama Kingdom, and MBC's fantasy legal drama Item. In 2020, Ju reprised his role in the second season of Kingdom, and starred in the legal drama Hyena. In January 2021, Ju signed with new agency H& Entertainment.

In 2021, news outlets announced that Ju will participate in film Hunt as cameo appearance. Film was released theatrically in South Korea on August 10, 2022.

In 2022, Ju was cast as Woo Chae-woon, main protagonist of sci-fi thriller drama Blood Free. It was released worldwide on Disney+ from April 10 to May 8, 2024, every Wednesday.

== Personal life ==
=== Military service ===
On February 2, 2010, Ju enlisted in the Republic of Korea Army to serve his mandatory military service for five weeks of basic training at 306th draft in Uijeongbu of Gyeonggi Province, followed by active duty with the reserve forces.

Later in August, Ju co-starred with fellow actor Lee Joon-gi in the military musical Voyage of Life. The musical, to commemorate the 60th anniversary of the Korean War, was co-produced by the Ministry of National Defense and Korea Musical Theatre Association. It ran from August 21 to 29 at the National Theater of Korea. Ju was discharged on November 21, 2011.

=== Legal issues ===
On April 27, 2009, Ju was indicted without detention by Seoul Metropolitan Police along with 15 people on suspicion of using ecstasy supplied by actors Yun Seol-hee and Ye Hak-young. On June 23, 2009, he pleaded guilty in court to use of ecstasy and ketamine. Ju was sentenced to a six-month prison term suspended for one year, 120 hours of community service and ₩360,000 won in fines. On the suspended sentence, the judge explained: "The nature of the crime is by no means light. However, he has no prior criminal record, has reflected deeply on the crime, and has not taken any drugs since the time a year and two months ago. Also, many fans from within the country and from overseas have appealed for an appropriate handling of the matter and sent petitions." Ju's lawyer also stated, "Of course he must accept the price of his crime, but wrong information kept coming out and exaggerated him as a habitual user, and some of it was unfair."

== Filmography ==
Key
†	Denotes films that have not yet been released

=== Film ===
Films appearances
Year	Title	Role	Notes	Ref.
2008	Antique	Kim Jin-hyeok		
2009	The Naked Kitchen	Park Du-re		
2012	I Am the King	Yi Do / Deok-chil		
2013	Marriage Blue	Kyung-soo		
2014	Love Suspicion	Kang-han	Chinese film	
2014	Confession	Jung In-chul		
2015	The Treacherous	Im Soong-jae		
2016	Asura: The City of Madness	Moon Sun-mo		
2017	Along with the Gods: The Two Worlds	Hae Won-maek		
2018	Along with the Gods: The Last 49 Days	Hae Won-maek		
2018	The Spy Gone North	Manager Jung		
2018	Dark Figure of Crime	Kang Tae-oh		
2022	Hunt	Hyun Soo-jung	Cameo appearance	
2022	Gentleman	Ji Hyeon-soo		
2023	Ransomed	Kim Pan-su		
2024	Project Silence	Joe Park		

=== Television series ===
Television series appearances
Year	Title	Role	Notes	Ref.
2002	Nonstop 3	Man on the street	Cameo	
2004	Apgujeong's Family House	Kindergarten teacher	Ep. 204	
2005	One Span Drama - Old Love	Man #2		
2006	Princess Hours	Crown Prince Lee Shin		
2007	Lucifer	Oh Seung-ha		
2012	Five Fingers	Yoo Ji-ho		
2013	Medical Top Team	Han Seung-jae		
2015	Mask	Choi Min-woo		
2019	Item	Kang Gon		
2019–2020	Kingdom	Crown Prince Lee Chang	Season 1–2	
2020	Hyena	Yoon Hee-jae		
2021	Jirisan	Kang Hyun-jo		
2024	Blood Free	Woo Chae-woon		
2024	Love Your Enemy	Seok Ji-won		
2024	Light Shop	Jung Won-young		
2025	The Trauma Code: Heroes on Call	Baek Kang-hyeok		
2025	The Witch	Baek-su	Cameo (episode 1)	
2026	Mad Concrete Dreams		Cameo	
2026	Climax	Bang Tae-seop		
2026	The Remarried Empress †	Sovieshu		

=== Television show ===
Television shows appearances
Year	Title	Role	Notes	Ref.
2021	Kiss the Universe	Narrator	One of the three documentaries	

=== Web shows ===
Web shows appearances
Year	Title	Role	Notes	Ref.
2023	Bros on Foot	Cast Member	with Ha Jung-woo, Choi Min-ho, and Yeo Jin-goo	

=== Music video appearances ===
Year	Song title	Artist	Ref.
2012	"처연"	Lowdown 30	
2014	"Fxxk U"	Gain feat. Bumkey	

== Accolades ==
=== Awards and nominations ===
Name of the award ceremony, year presented, category, nominee of the award, and the result of the nomination
Award ceremony	Year	Category	Nominee / Work	Result	Ref.
APAN Star Awards	2013	Popular Star Award	Five Fingers	Won	
APAN Star Awards	2020	Top Excellence Award, Actor in a Miniseries	Hyena	Nominated	
APAN Star Awards	2025	Top Excellence Award, Actor in a Miniseries	The Trauma Code: Heroes on Call, Love Your Enemy	Nominated	
Asia Artist Awards	2018	Artist of the Year	Ju Ji-hoon	Won	
Asia Artist Awards	2018	Best Actor	Ju Ji-hoon	Won	
Asia Model Awards	2008	Star Prize	Ju Ji-hoon	Won	
Asia Model Awards	2020	Asia Star Award	Ju Ji-hoon	Won	
Baeksang Arts Awards	2006	Best New Actor – Television	Princess Hours	Nominated	
Baeksang Arts Awards	2009	Most Popular Actor – Film	Antique	Won	
Baeksang Arts Awards	2009	Best New Actor – Film	Antique	Nominated	
Baeksang Arts Awards	2019	Best Actor – Film	Dark Figure of Crime	Nominated	
Baeksang Arts Awards	2020	Best Actor – Television	Hyena	Nominated	
Baeksang Arts Awards	2025	Best Actor – Television	The Trauma Code: Heroes on Call	Won	
Blue Dragon Film Awards	2018	Popular Star Award	The Spy Gone North	Won	
Blue Dragon Film Awards	2018	Best Actor	Dark Figure of Crime	Nominated	
Blue Dragon Film Awards	2018	Best Supporting Actor	The Spy Gone North	Nominated	
Blue Dragon Series Awards	2025	Best Actor	The Trauma Code: Heroes on Call	Won	
Buil Film Awards	2017	Best Supporting Actor	Asura: The City of Madness	Nominated	
Buil Film Awards	2018	Best Supporting Actor	The Spy Gone North	Won	
Buil Film Awards	2019	Best Actor	Dark Figure of Crime	Nominated	
Chunsa Film Art Awards	2017	Best Supporting Actor	Asura: The City of Madness	Nominated	
Chunsa Film Art Awards	2019	Best Actor	Dark Figure of Crime	Won	
Chunsa Film Art Awards	2019	Best Supporting Actor	The Spy Gone North	Nominated	
Fundex Awards	2025	Best Actor of OTT Original Drama	The Trauma Code: Heroes on Call	Nominated	
Fundex Awards	2025	Popular Star Prize – K-Drama Actor	The Trauma Code: Heroes on Call	Nominated	
Global OTT Awards	2020	Best Lead Actor	Kingdom	Won	
Global OTT Awards	2025	Best Lead Actor	The Trauma Code: Heroes on Call	Nominated	
Golden Cinema Film Festival	2019	Best Actor	Dark Figure of Crime	Won	
KBS Drama Awards	2007	Excellence Award, Actor in a Miniseries	Lucifer	Nominated	
KCA Consumer Day Awards	2018	Best Actor	Along with the Gods: The Two Worlds / Dark Figure of Crime	Won	
KOFRA Film Awards	2019	Best Supporting Actor	The Spy Gone North	Won	
Korea Best Dresser Swan Awards	2004	Best Male Model	Ju Ji-hoon	Won	
Korea Best Dresser Swan Awards	2005	Best Male Model	Ju Ji-hoon	Won	
Korean Association of Film Critics Awards	2018	Best Supporting Actor	The Spy Gone North	Won	
Korean Film Producers Association Awards	2018	Best Actor	Dark Figure of Crime	Won	
Marie Claire Asia Star Awards	2018	Asian Star Award	Along with the Gods: The Two Worlds / Dark Figure of Crime	Won	
MBC Drama Awards	2006	Best New Actor	Princess Hours	Won	
MBC Drama Awards	2013	Excellence Award, Actor in a Miniseries	Medical Top Team	Nominated	
MBC Drama Awards	2019	Top Excellence Award, Actor in a Monday-Tuesday Miniseries	Item	Nominated	
SBS Drama Awards	2012	Excellence Award, Actor in a Weekend/Daily Drama	Five Fingers	Nominated	
SBS Drama Awards	2015	Excellence Award, Actor in a Drama Special	Mask	Won	
SBS Drama Awards	2015	Top 10 Star Award	Mask	Won	
SBS Drama Awards	2020	Top Excellence Award, Actor in a Miniseries Action Drama	Hyena	Won	
SBS Drama Awards	2020	Best Couple Award	Ju Ji-hoon (with Kim Hye-soo); Hyena	Nominated	
SBS Drama Awards	2020	Grand Prize (Daesang)	Hyena	Nominated	
Seoul International Drama Awards	2025	Outstanding Korean Actor	The Trauma Code: Heroes on Call	Won	
Style Magazine	2005	Most Stylish Male Model	Ju Ji-hoon	Won	
The Korea Film Actor's Association	2016	Popular Film Star Award	Asura: The City of Madness	Won	
The Photographers' Association	2005	Best Male Model	Ju Ji-hoon	Won	
The Seoul Awards	2018	Best Supporting Actor	Along with the Gods: The Two Worlds / The Spy Gone North	Won	

=== State honors ===
Name of country, year given, and name of honor
Country	Award ceremony	Year	Honor or Award	Ref.
South Korea	Korean Popular Culture and Arts Awards (Note: Honors are given at the Korean Popular Culture and Arts Awards, arranged by the Korea Creative Content Agency and hosted by the Ministry of Culture, Sports and Tourism. They are awarded to those who have contributed to the arts and South Korea's pop culture.)	2025	Prime Minister's Commendation	

=== Listicles ===
Name of publisher, year listed, name of listicle, and placement
Publisher	Year	Listicle	Placement	Ref.
Forbes	2019	Korea Power Celebrity	40th	
Forbes	2020	Korea Power Celebrity	31st	
Forbes	2021	Korea Power Celebrity	25th	
Korean Film Council	2021	Korean Actors 200 (Note: Introduces 200 actors that best represent the present and future of Korean cinema to the people in the film industry all over the world.)	Included	
The Screen	2019	2009–2019 Top Box Office Powerhouse Actors in Korean Movies	13th	
