= TRCNG =

South Korean boy band

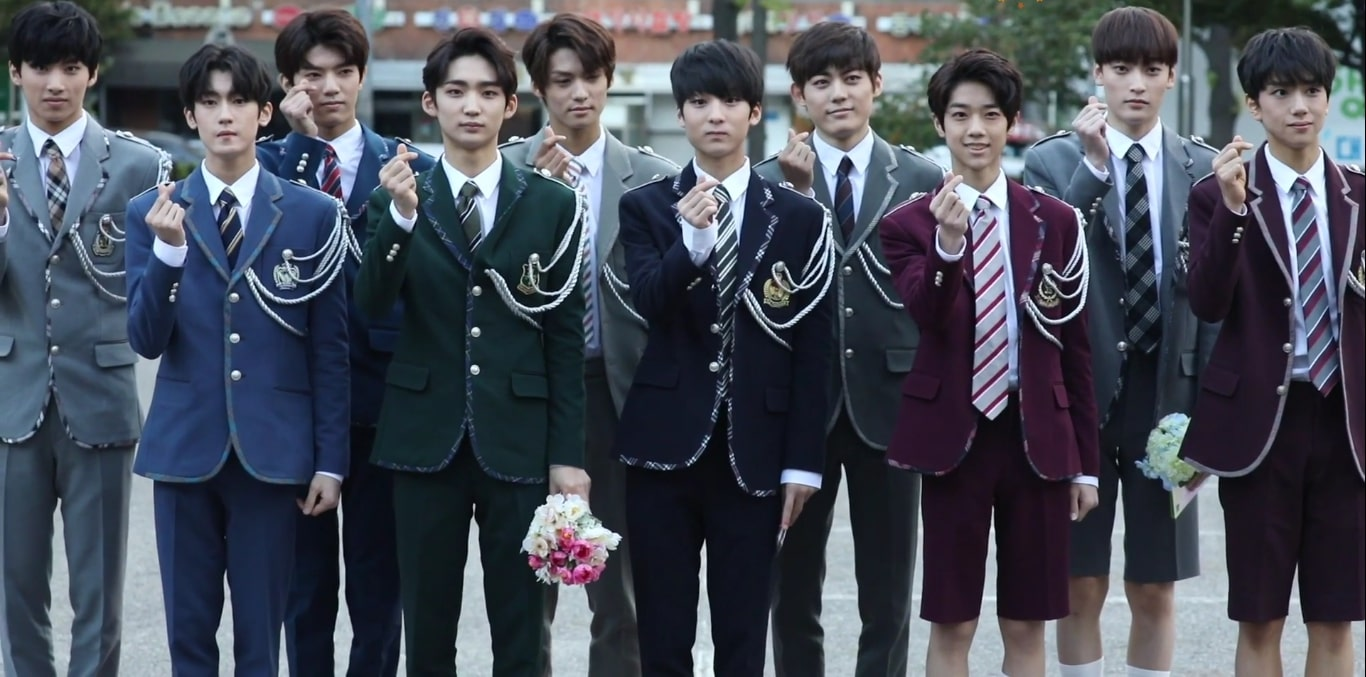
- TRCNG in October 2017

Background information
- Origin: Seoul, South Korea
- Genre: K-pop
- Years active: 2017–2022
- Label: TS
- Past members: Jihun; Hayoung; Taeseon; Hakmin; Wooyeop; Jisung; Hyunwoo; Siwoo; Hohyeon; Kangmin

TRCNG (Korean: 티알씨엔지; an acronym for Teen Rising Champion in a New Generation) was a South Korean boy band formed by TS Entertainment in 2017. They debuted with the EP New Generation on October 10, 2017.

TRCNG was originally a ten-piece group; Wooyeop and Taeseon left the group in November 2019 and filed suit against TS Entertainment for violations of child welfare legislation, alleging abuse, assault, and extortion. They, in turn, were sued by the parents of the remaining members for spreading false information. The group disbanded on March 28, 2022.

== History ==
=== 2017–2018: Debut, further releases and Japanese debut ===
On August 17, 2017, TS Entertainment announced that they would debut their second boy group in the latter half of 2017, the first since B.A.P.

On October 10, 2017, TRCNG released their first EP titled New Generation along with the music video for title track "Spectrum". Members Jisung and Hohyeon participated in the rap-writing themselves. A Japanese version of "Don't Stop the Dancing" was included and they debuted in Japan on November 22, 2017.

On January 2, 2018, TRCNG release the single album Who Am I along with the music video for the lead single "Wolf Baby". TRCNG released the Japanese single "Game Changer" on July 25. In September 2018, they launched the mobile app TRCNG Mobile. Designed for the group to communicate with fans, it was made available on Android and iOS.

=== 2019–2022: Rising, members lawsuits, TS shutdown, and disbandment ===
On May 17, 2019, TRCNG released the single "Paradise".

On November 4, Wooyeop and Taeseon filed a criminal complaint against TS Entertainment with the Seoul Metropolitan Police Agency for violating the Child Welfare Law, citing child abuse, assault, and money extortion. They filed a request to cancel their contracts with the company. It resulted in their departure from the group. The pair later disclosed evidence of their abuse, claims which TS denied. On November 27, the parents of the remaining TRCNG members filed a lawsuit against Wooyeop, Taeseon, and their parents, alleging that they were spreading false information and intentionally causing conflicts.

In January 2021, TRCNG's label, TS Entertainment, privately shut down and deleted its website, leaving the fate of the group unknown.

On March 28, 2022, the members of TRCNG released individual letters via social media to confirm the group's disbandment, as well as thank the fans for their support.

== Members ==
- Jihun (지훈)
- Hayoung (하영)
- Taeseon (태선) — leader
- Hakmin (학민)
- Wooyeop (우엽)
- Jisung (지성)
- Hyunwoo (현우)
- Siwoo (시우)
- Hohyeon (호현)
- Kangmin (강민)

== Discography ==
=== Extended plays ===
Title	Album details	Peak chart positions	Sales
Title	Album details	KOR	Sales
New Generation	Released: October 10, 2017; Label: TS Entertainment, LOEN Entertainment; Formats: CD, digital download; Track listing: 1. Ray of Light; 2. Spectrum; 3. My Very First Love; 4. I'm the One; 5. Don't Stop the Dancing; 6. 0 (Young)	14	KOR: 7,385

=== Single albums ===
Title	Album details	Peak chart positions	Sales
Title	Album details	KOR	Sales
Who Am I	Released: January 2, 2018; Label: TS Entertainment, LOEN Entertainment; Formats: CD, digital download; Track listing: 1. I Am; 2. Wolf Baby; 3. Utopia	21	KOR: 8,024
Spectrum	Released: April 4, 2018; Label: TS Entertainment, LOEN Entertainment; Formats: CD, digital download; Track listing: 1. Spectrum (Japanese Version); 2. Just I Love You	—	—N/a
Game Changer	Released: July 25, 2018; Label: TS Entertainment, LOEN Entertainment; Formats: CD, digital download; Track listing: 1. Game Changer; 2. With you	—	—N/a
Rising	Released: September 6, 2019; Label: TS Entertainment, Kakao M; Formats: CD, digital download; Track listing: 1. Paradise; 2. Missing; 3. Island; 4. Paradise (Inst.); 5. #턀쎈지 (Hidden Track)	21	KOR: 1,383
"—" denotes releases that did not chart or were not released in that region.

=== Singles ===
Title	Year	Peak chart positions		Sales	Album
Title	Year	KOR	JPN	Sales	Album
Korean	Year				
"Spectrum"	2017	—	—	—N/a	New Generation
"Wolf Baby"	2018	—	—	—N/a	Who Am I
"Paradise"	2019	—	—	—N/a	Rising
"Missing"	2019	—	—	—N/a	Rising
Japanese
"Spectrum"	2018	—	14	JPN: 3,270	Spectrum
"Game Changer"	2018	—	24	JPN: 4,274	Game Changer
"—" denotes releases that did not chart or were not released in that region.
