= Five Fingers (South Korean TV series) =

2012 South Korean television series

- Promotional poster
- Genre: Romance; Music
- Written by: Kim Soon-ok
- Directed by: Choi Hyeong-hun
- Starring: Chae Shi-ra; Ju Ji-hoon; Ji Chang-wook; Jin Se-yeon
- Composer: Ha Geun-young
- Country of origin: South Korea
- Original language: Korean
- No. of episodes: 30

Production
- Executive producer: Kang Shin-hyo
- Producer: Lee Myung-suk
- Production location: Korean
- Running time: 70 minutes
- Production companies: Jidam Inc. (formerly Yein E&M)

Original release
- Network: SBS TV
- Release: August 18 – November 25, 2012

Five Fingers (Korean: 다섯손가락; RR: Daseotsongarak) is a 2012 South Korean television series starring Chae Shi-ra, Ju Ji-hoon, Ji Chang-wook and Jin Se-yeon. It aired on SBS TV's Saturdays and Sundays at 22:00 (KST) time slot, from August 18 to November 25, 2012, for 30 episodes.

== Synopsis ==
Set in South Korea, the drama's first 4 episodes focus on the childhoods of Yoo Ji-ho (Ju Ji-hoon) and Yoo In-ha (Ji Chang-wook). 12-year-old Yoo Ji-ho (Kang Yi-seok) lives with his adoptive grandmother. One day, during a thunderstorm, his grandma is killed after being run over by a mysterious black car. Afterwards, Yoo Ji-ho is invited into the family of Yoo In-ha.

11-year-old Yoo In-ha (Kim Ji-hoon) is the son of a wealthy CEO of a piano company. He is an overly cocky piano prodigy, winning all of the competitions he enters. After Yoo Ji-ho is introduced as the elder son of Yoo In-ha's father, Yoo In-ha begins to feel threatened by Yoo Ji-ho, who has lots of musical talent.

Chae Yeong-rang (Chae Shi-ra), Yoo In-ha's mother, is forced to accept Yoo Ji-ho as her son. She is extremely unhappy about this, especially after discovering that her husband plans to hand the company down to Yoo Ji-ho instead of Yoo In-ha. After arguing with her husband, she unintentionally strikes him down onto the ground, causing his head to bleed. Fearing that she has killed her husband, she flees, but discovers that their house is on fire. Unintentionally caused by her mother-in-law, who fell asleep after lighting the candles on a birthday cake, she rushes out of the house, begging a deaf and mute street dessert vendor to help her rescue her two grandsons.

The street dessert vendor's daughter is friends with both Yoo Ji-ho and Yoo In-ha. Her name is Hong Da-mi (Kim Sung-kyung). Yoo Ji-ho taught the girl her first piano piece, while Yoo In-ha gave her official piano lessons.

Realizing that her son is still upstairs, Yeong-rang rushes upstairs to rescue him from the fire. She unintentionally rescues Yoo Ji-ho instead of Yoo In-ha, believing that Yoo Ji-ho is her actual son because he is wearing the bunny pajamas that she gave to Yoo In-ha earlier. After realizing that she rescued the other son, she attempts to reenter the building, but is stopped by firefighters.

Yoo In-ha sustains major injuries caused by the fire, but is thankfully saved by the street dessert vendor. Unfortunately, the man dies after a chandelier falls on top of him. Yoo In-ha discovers that his fingers are ruined due to the fire. His mother orders his doctor to perform a skin graft surgery, which would allow Yoo In-ha to play the piano once more. After the surgery, Yoo In-ha discovers that he can no longer move his pinky finger, resulting in much anguish. Yoo In-ha attempts to commit suicide by jumping off the hospital building, but is saved by his older brother, Yoo Ji-ho.

After being interrogated by police about the fire, Chae Yeong-rang blames the street vendor for it, claiming that he was a thief. The street vendor's family is shamed and forced to move away.

14 years later, Yoo Ji-ho and Yoo In-ha meet Hong Da-mi (Jin Se-yeon) again, competing for her love. Who will win?

== Cast ==
=== Main ===
- Chae Shi-ra as Chae Yeong-rang
- Ju Ji-hoon as Yoo Ji-ho
  - Kang Yi-seok as young Ji-ho
- Ji Chang-wook as Yoo In-ha
  - Kim Ji-hoon as young In-ha
- Jin Se-yeon as Hong Da-mi
  - Kim Sung-kyung as young Da-mi

=== Supporting ===
- Jeon Mi-seon as Song Nam-joo
- Jung Eun-woo as Hong Woo-jin
- Lee Hae-in as Jung So-yeol
- Jo Min-ki as Yoo Man-se
- Na Moon-hee as Min Ban-wol
- Jeon No-min as Kim Jung-wook
- Cha Hwa-yeon as Na Gye-hwa
- Jang Hyun-sung as Choi Seung-jae
- Jeong Jun-ha as Louis Kang

== Controversy ==
Accusations of plagiarism were made by the author of novel Blood Rhapsody, which the production denied.

Hahm Eun-jung was initially cast as the female lead Hong Da-mi, and she had already appeared in the promotional teasers and stills, as well as attended the press conference. But due to the negative publicity stemming from T-ara's bullying controversy, the production fired her and replaced her with Jin Se-yeon. Hahm filed a lawsuit against the producers, and the Corea Entertainment Management Association (CEMA) issued a boycott against the production company Yein E&M (now known as Jidam Inc.). In February 2013, Yein E&M issued a formal apology for firing Hahm without notice.

== Ratings ==
- In the table below, the blue numbers represent the lowest ratings and the red numbers represent the highest ratings.

Ep.	Original broadcast date	Average audience share			
Ep.	Original broadcast date	Nielsen Korea		TNmS	
Ep.	Original broadcast date	Nationwide	Seoul	Nationwide	Seoul
1	August 18, 2012	11.2%	12.5%	12.1%	13.4%
2	August 19, 2012	12.7%	14.2%	13.4%	16.3%
3	August 25, 2012	14.1%	15.3%	15.0%	17.4%
4	August 26, 2012	14.0%	14.9%	13.8%	15.7%
5	September 1, 2012	13.7%	14.3%	13.3%	15.1%
6	September 2, 2012	11.8%	12.8%	11.3%	12.4%
7	September 8, 2012	10.8%	11.0%	10.7%	11.6%
8	September 9, 2012	10.5%	11.3%	9.4%	10.7%
9	September 15, 2012	10.4%	10.5%	10.1%	11.2%
10	September 16, 2012	9.2%	9.6%	9.8%	9.7%
11	September 22, 2012	11.7%	12.6%	10.9%	11.9%
12	September 23, 2012	10.0%	10.2%	10.5%	11.6%
13	September 29, 2012	8.9%	9.4%	10.6%	12.2%
14	September 29, 2012	8.5%	8.9%	9.8%	10.9%
15	October 6, 2012	10.2%	10.5%	10.1%	11.3%
16	October 7, 2012	8.4%	8.8%	9.6%	10.9%
17	October 13, 2012	10.1%	10.4%	9.4%	10.4%
18	October 14, 2012	9.3%	9.4%	10.1%	12.1%
19	October 20, 2012	11.3%	12.1%	10.3%	11.4%
20	October 21, 2012	10.8%	11.0%	9.7%	10.9%
21	October 27, 2012	11.4%	11.9%	11.9%	12.6%
22	October 28, 2012	10.9%	11.7%	11.8%	12.7%
23	November 3, 2012	12.6%	13.7%	11.4%	12.6%
24	November 4, 2012	13.0%	13.2%	12.6%	14.1%
25	November 10, 2012	13.5%	14.1%	13.7%	16.0%
26	November 11, 2012	13.5%	14.3%	13.3%	14.7%
27	November 17, 2012	12.6%	13.0%	11.8%	13.2%
28	November 18, 2012	12.3%	12.7%	11.5%	11.9%
29	November 24, 2012	12.5%	13.3%	12.0%	12.4%
30	November 25, 2012	11.4%	11.6%	11.3%	12.3%
Average		11.4%	12.0%	11.4%	12.7%

== International broadcast ==
- The series aired in Japan on TBS beginning July 24, 2013.
- In Vietnam, the series aired on VTVCab7 D-Drama from July 17, 2013.
- In Thailand, the series aired on 3SD in a network of Channel 3 under the title ทำนองรักทำนองชีวิต (thảnxng rạk thảnxng chīwit; literally: Rhythm Love, Rhythm Life) beginning June 28, 2016.
- The series also aired in 2013 in Hong Kong.
