= My Sassy Girl (TV series) =

2017 South Korean television series

- Promotional poster
- Genre: Historical; Romantic-comedy
- Based on: My Sassy Girl by Kwak Jae-yong
- Written by: Yoon Hyo-je
- Directed by: Oh Jin-seok
- Starring: Joo Won; Oh Yeon-seo; Lee Jung-shin; Kim Yoon-hye
- Country of origin: South Korea
- Original language: Korean
- No. of episodes: 32 (Note: The series was originally packaged as sixteen 70-minute episodes. In order to circumvent Korean laws that prevent commercial breaks in the middle of an episode, what would previously have been aired as single 70 minute episodes are now being repackaged as two 35-minute episodes, with two episodes being shown each night with a commercial break between the two. This, following a fall in ratings and an eventual 2-episode cut in a previous drama serial Saimdang, Memoir of Colors.)

Production
- Producers: Sim Jung-woon; Kim Dong-rae; Shin Chul
- Running time: 30 mins
- Production companies: Huayi Brothers; Shincine Communication; RaemongRaein Co. Ltd.

Original release
- Network: SBS
- Release: May 29 – July 18, 2017

My Sassy Girl (Korean: 엽기적인 그녀; RR: Yeopgijeogin geunyeo) is a 2017 South Korean television drama starring Joo Won, Oh Yeon-seo, Lee Jung-shin and Kim Yoon-hye, based on the 2001 South Korean movie My Sassy Girl by Kwak Jae-yong, but during Joseon period. It aired on SBS from May 29 to July 18, 2017, on Mondays and Tuesdays at 22:00 (KST) for 32 episodes.

== Synopsis ==
The love story of a cold city scholar Gyeon Woo (Joo Won) who's known as "Joseon's national treasure" and the sassy princess Hye-myung (Oh Yeon-seo) in the Joseon Dynasty era who doesn't have the best reputation among the people. She often sneaks out of the palace in search of her mother, the dethroned queen. During one such adventure, she meets Gyeon Woo; initially enemies, then friends, and they fall in love.

== Cast ==
=== Main ===
- Joo Won as Gyeon Woo
  - Jeon Jin-seo as young Gyeon Woo

He was an eminent and affable scholar who returned after three years of study in Qing, where he was highly praised by its ruler. Gyeon Woo earned the title of 'National Treasure of Joseon' from King Hwijong during his childhood. He is the son of the education minister and the king appoints him as the tutor to the Heir Presumptive. Despite initial conflicts with Princess Hye-myung, he assists her, as she pursues the secrets surrounding her mother's dethronement.

- Oh Yeon-seo as Princess Hye-myung

She is a strong willed, independent yet mischievous and trouble making person with a kind heart and cannot stand the wrongdoings of people. Initially she dislikes Gyeon Woo but, later falls in love with him. She is struggling to know what has happened to her mother.

- Lee Jung-shin as Kang Joon-young

The inspector at the police bureau. He cherishes princess Hyemyeong and always protects her.

- Kim Yoon-hye as Jung Da-yeon

She is the stubborn and spoiled daughter of the left minister Jung Ki-joon. She falls for Gyeon Woo and will do anything to get him. She is the love rival of princess Hye-myung.

=== Supporting ===
==== People in the Palace ====
- Son Chang-min as King Hwijong
- Yoon Se-ah as Queen Park
- Yoon So-jung as Dowager Queen Jahye
- Choi Ro-woon as the Heir Presumptive, Princess Hye-myung's younger brother
- Ryu Dam as Young-shin, eunuch to Princess Hye-myung
- Tae Mi as Byeol-i, Princess Hye-myung's bodyguard
- Lee Kyung-hwa as the Deposed Queen Han
- Hong Ye-seo as Court Lady Bang

==== Gyeon Woo's Family ====
- Jo Hee-bong as Gyeon Pil-hyung, Gyeon Woo's father, Chief Scholar
- Jang Young-nam as Lady Heo, Gyeon Woo's mother
- Jung Da-bin as Gyeon Hee, Gyeon Woo's little sister who admires Jung Da-yeon and tries to help her get together with Gyeon Woo; she also cannot keep secrets

==== Ministers ====
- Jung Woong-in as Jung Ki-joon, Left Minister and Jung Da-yeon's father
- Oh Hee-jung as Min Yu-hwan, Princess Hye-myung's teacher and close friend of Kang Joon-young
- Kim Byeong-ok as Park Sun-jae
- Kang Shin-hyo as Wol-myung
- Park Geun-soo
- Kim Young-suk

=== Others ===
- Shim Hyung-tak as Choon-poong/ Prince Eunseong, younger brother of Prince Choosung
- Kwak Hee-sung as Park Chang-whi, Second Lieutenant of the Ministry of Supervision, which was granted by his father and has a crush on Jung Da-yeon
- Lee Si-eon as Bang Se-ho, Gyeon Woo's friend
- Seol Jung-hwan as Maeng Kwang-soo
- Park Young-soo as Hwang-ga
- Seo Eun-ah as Mal-geum, Jung Da-yeon's servant, falls for Bang Se-ho
- Han Ji-woo as Boo-yong
- Kim Yang-woo as Do-chi
- Jung Da-sol as So-yong
- Na Hye-mi as Bo-young
- Kris Sun (孙祖君) as Prince Darhan of Qing
- Noh Susanna as Sun-kyung
- Son Ji-yoon as Yoon-ji
- Ko Min-seo as Sun-kyung
- Lee Je-yeon
- Lee Si-gang
- Jung Tae-in
- Go Min-si as Seon-kyeong

=== Special appearance ===
- Kim Min-jun as Prince Choosung
- Jo Jae-ryong as Butcher
- Park Jin-joo

== Production ==
- The series is one of a handful of youth sageuk set in production after the success of Love in the Moonlight (2016) starring Park Bo-gum and Kim Yoo-jung.
- This project marked the second collaboration between actor Joo Won and director Oh Jin-seok, after working together in the 2015 hit drama Yong-pal. The first script reading took place on August 27, 2016. My Sassy Girl is a fully pre-produced TV series. Filming began in August 2016 and finished on March 7, 2017.
- Actress Kim Ju-hyeon was selected to play the female lead role through auditions, but was replaced by Oh Yeon-seo after quitting.

== Ratings ==
| Ep. | Original broadcast date | Average audience share | | | |
| Ep. | Original broadcast date | Nielsen Korea | | TNmS | |
| Ep. | Original broadcast date | Nationwide | Seoul | Nationwide | Seoul |
|---|---|---|---|---|---|
| 1 | May 29, 2017 | 8.5% (12th) | 8.9% (10th) | 8.3% (16th) | 9.9% (9th) |
| 2 | May 29, 2017 | 9.3% (8th) | 10.0% (7th) | 9.3% (10th) | 11.3% (4th) |
| 3 | May 30, 2017 | 7.4% (13th) | 7.7% (10th) | 6.5% (20th) | 6.8% (20th) |
| 4 | May 30, 2017 | 9.3% (8th) | 9.3% (7th) | 8.1% (11th) | 9.5% (5th) |
| 5 | June 5, 2017 | 7.2% (16th) | 7.9% (10th) | 7.4% (17th) | 8.3% (9th) |
| 6 | June 5, 2017 | 8.2% (10th) | 8.9% (7th) | 7.7% (16th) | 8.5% (8th) |
| 7 | June 6, 2017 | 8.1% (13th) | 8.6% (9th) | 7.1% (NR) | 8.0% (13th) |
| 8 | June 6, 2017 | 9.3% (8th) | 9.7% (8th) | 8.2% (15th) | 8.8% (7th) |
| 9 | June 12, 2017 | 7.9% (12th) | 8.1% (10th) | 7.4% (NR) | 7.9% (12th) |
| 10 | June 12, 2017 | 9.0% (7th) | 9.2% (7th) | 8.1% (16th) | 9.1% (7th) |
| 11 | June 13, 2017 | 8.5% (8th) | 9.3% (6th) | 7.4% (17th) | 7.7% (11th) |
| 12 | June 13, 2017 | 10.5% (5th) | 11.8% (4th) | 9.0% (10th) | 9.4% (5th) |
| 13 | June 19, 2017 | 8.1% (9th) | 8.7% (9th) | 7.5% (18th) | 8.1% (11th) |
| 14 | June 19, 2017 | 9.3% (7th) | 9.5% (7th) | 7.8% (16th) | 8.1% (10th) |
| 15 | June 20, 2017 | 8.3% (12th) | 9.2% (7th) | 5.5% (NR) | 6.4% (17th) |
| 16 | June 20, 2017 | 10.3% (6th) | 11.2% (5th) | 6.6% (18th) | 7.4% (15th) |
| 17 | June 26, 2017 | 8.2% (11th) | 8.2% (9th) | 7.2% (18th) | 7.9% (10th) |
| 18 | June 26, 2017 | 9.4% (8th) | 9.1% (7th) | 7.8% (14th) | 8.6% (7th) |
| 19 | June 27, 2017 | 8.2% (11th) | 8.4% (9th) | 6.8% (20th) | 7.5% (14th) |
| 20 | June 27, 2017 | 9.6% (6th) | 9.9% (6th) | 7.9% (16th) | 8.7% (9th) |
| 21 | July 3, 2017 | 8.5% (12th) | 9.2% (7th) | 7.4% (NR) | 7.9% (17th) |
| 22 | July 3, 2017 | 8.8% (8th) | 9.3% (6th) | 7.8% (18th) | 8.4% (14th) |
| 23 | July 4, 2017 | 8.3% (14th) | 8.4% (12th) | 6.9% (20th) | 7.5% (16th) |
| 24 | July 4, 2017 | 9.7% (7th) | 9.9% (6th) | 7.9% (18th) | 8.5% (12th) |
| 25 | July 10, 2017 | 7.6% (NR) | 7.6% (NR) | 7.7% (NR) | 8.4% (19th) |
| 26 | July 10, 2017 | 8.6% (15th) | 8.5% (10th) | 8.0% (NR) | 8.6% (17th) |
| 27 | July 11, 2017 | 7.7% (15th) | 7.7% (14th) | 6.7% (NR) | 6.8% (18th) |
| 28 | July 11, 2017 | 8.7% (12th) | 8.5% (10th) | 7.4% (17th) | 7.6% (16th) |
| 29 | July 17, 2017 | 8.9% (14th) | 9.6% (6th) | 7.3% (NR) | 8.5% (13th) |
| 30 | July 17, 2017 | 10.2% (6th) | 10.8% (4th) | 8.0% (17th) | 9.3% (9th) |
| 31 | July 18, 2017 | 9.6% (6th) | 10.4% (5th) | 9.2% (12th) | 11.2% (5th) |
| 32 | July 18, 2017 | 11.4% (5th) | 12.0% (4th) | 10.4% (8th) | 12.3% (4th) |
| Average | | 8.8% | 9.2% | 7.7% | 8.5% |
In the table above, the blue numbers represent the lowest ratings and the red numbers represent the highest ratings.; NR denotes that the drama did not rank in the top 20 daily programs on that date.

== Original soundtrack ==
My Sassy Girl OST Album

Soundtrack album by Various Artists
- Released: 2017
- Genre: Soundtrack
- Languages: Korean, English
- Labels: Warner Music Korea; Raemong Raein

=== Part 1 ===
| No. | Title | Artist | Length |
|---|---|---|---|
| 1. | "Because It Is You" (그대이기에) | The One | 03:46 |
| 2. | "Because It Is You" (Inst.) | | 03:46 |
| Total length: | | | 07:32 |

=== Part 2 ===
| No. | Title | Artist | Length |
|---|---|---|---|
| 1. | "Permeate" (스르륵) | SE O (Jelly Cookie) | 02:54 |
| 2. | "Permeate" (Inst.) | | 02:54 |
| Total length: | | | 05:48 |

=== Part 3 ===
| No. | Title | Artist | Length |
|---|---|---|---|
| 1. | "Because I Love You" | Gummy | 03:35 |
| 2. | "Because I Love You" (Inst.) | | 03:35 |
| Total length: | | | 07:10 |

=== Part 4 ===
| No. | Title | Artist | Length |
|---|---|---|---|
| 1. | "Like Destiny" (운명처럼) | Ben | 4:06 |
| 2. | "Like Destiny" (Inst.) | | 4:06 |
| Total length: | | | 08:12 |

== Awards and nominations ==
| Year | Award | Category | Recipient | Result | Ref. |
|---|---|---|---|---|---|
| 2017 | 10th Korea Drama Awards | Best Original Soundtrack | Gummy (Because I Love You) | Nominated | |
| 2017 | SBS Drama Awards | Top Excellence Award, Actor in a Monday–Tuesday Drama | Joo Won | Nominated | |
| 2017 | SBS Drama Awards | Top Excellence Award, Actor in a Monday–Tuesday Drama | Oh Yeon-seo | Nominated | |
| 2017 | SBS Drama Awards | Excellence Award, Actor in a Monday–Tuesday Drama | Jung Woong-in | Nominated | |
| 2017 | SBS Drama Awards | Best New Actor | Lee Jung-shin | Nominated | |
| 2017 | SBS Drama Awards | Best Couple Award | Joo Won & Oh Yeon-seo | Nominated | |

== International broadcast ==
- In Singapore, Malaysia, Indonesia and Brunei, My Sassy Girl aired at the same time as its Korean broadcast on Sony One, In Taiwan it airs on CHOCO TV, friDay and KKTV, it also airs the day after the original date on IQiyi.
- In Hong Kong, the drama started airing on Viu starting from May 30, 2017.
- In Japan, the drama started airing on KNTV from June 3, 2017.
- In Taiwan, the drama started airing on LTV from June 29, 2017.
- In Sri Lanka, the drama is available to stream on-demand via Iflix with Sinhalese and English subtitles.
- In Malaysia, the drama started airing on NTV7 from February 6, 2018, Monday - Thursday, 6:00pm – 7:00pm.
- In the Philippines, the drama started airing on GMA Network from March 25, 2019, Monday - Friday, 9:20 AM, and reairs on GMA News TV from January 27, 2020, Monday - Friday, 11:00 PM.

== See also ==
- My Sassy Girl (2001)
- My Sassy Girl (2008)
- Ryokiteki na Kanojo (2008)
- Ugly Aur Pagli (2008)
- Sano Sansar (2008)
- My Sassy Girl 2 (2010)
