= The Midnight Studio =

2024 South Korean television series

- Promotional poster
- Hangul: 야한 사진관
- Lit.: Night Photo Studio
- RR: Yahan sajingwan
- MR: Yahan sajin'gwan
- Genre: Fantasy; Romance
- Based on: Night Photo Studio by Kim Yi-rang
- Written by: Kim Yi-rang
- Directed by: Song Hyun-wook
- Starring: Joo Won; Kwon Nara; Yoo In-soo; Eum Moon-suk
- Music by: Taven
- Opening theme: "I Wonder Why" by Elaine Kim
- Country of origin: South Korea
- Original language: Korean
- No. of episodes: 16

Production
- Executive producers: Kim Hyun-jung; Choi Han-gyul
- Producers: Kang Bo-young; Ahn Chang-ho; Baek Chang-joo; Jung Yeon-ji; Kim Hyun-cheol; Heo Min-ho; Ha Seom-gyul
- Cinematography: Han Dong-hyun
- Editors: Lee Ji-hyun; Seon Han-saem
- Running time: 60 minutes
- Production companies: Slingshot Studio; C-JeS Studios

Original release
- Network: ENA
- Release: March 11 – May 6, 2024

The Midnight Studio (Korean: 야한 사진관) is a 2024 South Korean television series written by Kim Yi-rang, directed by Song Hyun-wook, and starring Joo Won, Kwon Nara, Yoo In-soo, and Eum Moon-suk. Based on the screenwriter's own novel of the same name, it is about a lonely photographer who takes pictures of dead people. It is an original drama of Genie TV, and is available for streaming on its platform, and on Viki in selected regions. It is also aired on ENA on March 11, to May 6, 2024, every Monday and Tuesday at 22:00 (KST).

== Synopsis ==
The series tells the story of a prickly photographer who runs a photo studio that exists only for the deceased, and a passionate lawyer.

== Cast and characters ==
=== Main ===
- Joo Won as Seo Ki-joo

A photographer and the seventh owner of a photo studio.

- Kwon Nara as Han Bom

A lawyer who cannot tolerate injustice.

- Yoo In-soo as Assistant Manager Go

The photo studio's customer sales representative.

- Eum Moon-suk as Baek Nam-gu

A former homicide detective who is in charge of miscellaneous tasks at the photo studio.

=== Supporting ===
- Lee Bom-so-ri as Kim Ji-won

Bom's best friend.

- Kim Young-ok as So Geum-soon

Bom's grandmother.

- Park Jung-ah as Kang Soo-mi

A talented lawyer who is also Bom's senior.

- Han Groo as Jin Na-rae

Nam-gu's wife.

- Ahn Chang-hwan as Lee Seon-ho

A police officer.

- Seo Woo-jin as Im Yoon-hae

Twin brother of Im Yoon-dal.

== Original soundtrack ==
=== Part 1 ===
Released on March 12, 2024
No.	Title	Lyrics	Music	Artist	Length
1.	"Count on Me"	Ogi (Galactika *)	Sean Kimm; Taelin; Isaac; Pro; Athena (Galactika *); Woo-bin (Galactika *)	Ningning	3:17
2.	"Count on Me" (Inst.)		Sean Kimm; Taelin; Isaac; Pro; Athena (Galactika *); Woo-bin (Galactika *)		3:17
Total length:					6:34

=== Part 2 ===
Released on March 19, 2024
No.	Title	Lyrics	Music	Artist	Length
1.	"Press Rewind" (그 시절의 너에게)	Sean Kimm	B.btan; Sean Kimm	Yang Da-il	4:23
2.	"Press Rewind" (그 시절의 너에게; Inst.)		B.btan; Sean Kimm		4:23
Total length:					8:46

=== Part 3 ===
Released on March 26, 2024
No.	Title	Lyrics	Music	Artist	Length
1.	"I Wonder Why"	Hollin	Hollin; Kimmuse	Elaine Kim	3:51
2.	"I Wonder Why" (Inst.)		Hollin; Kimmuse		3:51
Total length:					7:42

=== Part 4 ===
Released on April 2, 2024
No.	Title	Lyrics	Music	Artist	Length
1.	"Your Traces" (너의 흔적)	Han Kyung-soo; Lee Do-hyung (AUG)	Han Kyung-soo; Lee Do-hyung (AUG)	Ben	3:43
2.	"Your Traces" (너의 흔적; Inst.)		Han Kyung-soo; Lee Do-hyung(AUG)		3:43
Total length:					7:26

=== Part 5 ===
Released on April 9, 2024
No.	Title	Lyrics	Music	Artist	Length
1.	"Destiny" (우리 만남은 우연이었을까요)	Dong Woo-seok	Dong Woo-seok; Yoo Jung-hyun	Seungmin	4:12
2.	"Destiny" (우리 만남은 우연이었을까요; Inst.)		Dong Woo-seok; Yoo Jung-hyun		4:12
Total length:					8:24

== Viewership ==
The Midnight Studio : South Korea viewers per episode (thousands)

Season	Episode number																Average
Season	1	2	3	4	5	6	7	8	9	10	11	12	13	14	15	16	Average
1	454	605	555	628	572	506	439	532	508	504	500	337	531	403	393	523	499

Source: Audience measurement performed nationwide by Nielsen Korea.

Average TV viewership ratings
Ep.	Original broadcast date	Average audience share (Nielsen Korea)	
Ep.	Original broadcast date	Nationwide	Seoul
1	March 11, 2024	2.107% (4th)	2.221% (4th)
2	March 12, 2024	2.508% (3rd)	2.443% (3rd)
3	March 18, 2024	2.346% (3rd)	2.569% (2nd)
4	March 19, 2024	2.477% (3rd)	2.398% (3rd)
5	March 25, 2024	2.293% (2nd)	1.988% (2nd)
6	April 1, 2024	2.233% (3rd)	2.261% (3rd)
7	April 2, 2024	1.765% (4th)	1.760% (4th)
8	April 8, 2024	2.176% (3rd)	2.447% (3rd)
9	April 9, 2024	2.068% (3rd)	2.213% (3rd)
10	April 15, 2024	2.149% (3rd)	2.232% (3rd)
11	April 16, 2024	2.085% (4th)	1.865% (4th)
12	April 22, 2024	1.398% (6th)	1.428% (7th)
13	April 23, 2024	2.282% (3rd)	2.439% (3rd)
14	April 29, 2024	1.608% (5th)	1.369% (6th)
15	April 30, 2024	1.974% (3rd)	2.072% (3rd)
16	May 6, 2024	1.963% (2nd)	1.927% (2nd)
Average		2.090%	2.102%
In the table above, the blue numbers represent the lowest ratings and the red numbers represent the highest ratings.; This series aired on a cable channel/pay TV which normally has a relatively smaller audience compared to free-to-air TV/public broadcasters (KBS, SBS, MBC, and EBS).
