= 7th Grade Civil Servant =

2013 South Korean television series

- Promotional poster for 7th Grade Civil Servant
- Also known as: Level 7 Civil Servant; Class 7 Civil Servant
- Hangul: 7급 공무원
- Hanja: 七級 公務員
- RR: 7geup gongmuwon
- MR: 7kŭp kongmuwŏn
- Genre: Romantic comedy; Action
- Based on: My Girlfriend Is an Agent by Chun Sung-il
- Written by: Chun Sung-il
- Directed by: Kim Sang-hyup; Oh Hyun-jong
- Starring: Choi Kang-hee; Joo Won
- Composer: Park Se-jun
- Country of origin: South Korea
- Original language: Korean
- No. of episodes: 20

Production
- Executive producer: Park Hong-gyun
- Producer: Kim Jung-hwan
- Production locations: South Korea; Pattaya, Thailand
- Cinematography: Hong Sung-wook; Yoon Kwon-soo
- Editor: Lee Taek-joo
- Running time: 60 minutes
- Production companies: Appletree Pictures; Curtain Call Production

Original release
- Network: MBC TV
- Release: January 23 – March 28, 2013

Related
- My Girlfriend Is an Agent (2009)

7th Grade Civil Servant (Korean: 7급 공무원; RR: 7geup gongmuwon) is a 2013 South Korean television series starring Choi Kang-hee and Joo Won as rookie spies who trained together, and later become NIS agents who must hide their real identities from each other even as they fall in love. It aired on MBC from January 23 to March 28, 2013, on Wednesdays and Thursdays at 21:55 (KST) for 20 episodes.

The series is a remake of the 2009 film My Girlfriend Is An Agent. Early working titles were "Secret Agent War" and "The Secret Lovers".

== Plot ==
Love and espionage collide in this drama of the National Intelligence Service's rookie agents. Han Gil-ro (Joo Won) realizes his dream of becoming an international man of mystery, after a childhood spent poring over James Bond films. Kim Seo-won (Choi Kang-hee) spices things up as a goofy, yet determined agent, but it's not all 007 glamor. Both Gil-ro and Seo-won must learn what it takes to uphold their sworn duty, even at the sacrifice of their happiness — and lives.

== Cast ==
- Choi Kang-hee as Kim Seo-won / Kim Kyung-ja
- Joo Won as Han Gil-ro / Han Pil-hoon
- Hwang Chan-sung as Gong Do-ha
- Kim Min-seo as Shin Sun-mi
- Ahn Nae-sang as Kim Won-seok
- Jang Young-nam as Jang Young-soon
- Kim Soo-hyun as Kim Mi-rae
- Lim Yoon-ho as JJ / Choi Woo-jin
- Dokgo Young-jae as Han Joo-man, Gil-ro's father
- Im Ye-jin as Go Soo-ja, Gil-ro's mother
- Lee Han-wi as Kim Pan-seok, Seo-won's father
- Kim Mi-kyung as Oh Mak-nae, Seo-won's mother
- Noh Young-hak as Kim Min-ho, Seo-won's younger brother
- Choi Jong-hwan as Oh Kwang-jae
- Ha Shi-eun as Jin-joo
- Son Jin-young as Kim Poong-eon
- Lee El as Park Soo-young
- Jung In-gi as Kim Sung-joon
- Seo Seung-man as IT&TI manager
- Lee Hye-eun as Won-seok's wife
- Uhm Tae-woong as Choi Woo-hyuk (guest appearance, Ep. 1–4)

== Reception ==
Episode #	Original broadcast date	Average audience share			
Episode #	Original broadcast date	TNmS Ratings (%)		AGB Nielsen (%)	
Episode #	Original broadcast date	Nationwide	Seoul National Capital Area	Nationwide	Seoul National Capital Area
1	January 23, 2013	12.8%	15.6%	12.7%	14.6%
2	January 24, 2013	14.0%	16.0%	14.5%	16.9%
3	January 30, 2013	16.0%	18.1%	15.9%	18.1%
4	January 31, 2013	15.8%	18.8%	15.2%	17.2%
5	February 6, 2013	17.1%	20.1%	16.0%	17.7%
6	February 7, 2013	14.9%	16.8%	14.3%	16.0%
7	February 13, 2013	13.3%	14.0%	12.7%	13.3%
8	February 14, 2013	13.8%	15.1%	12.1%	13.2%
9	February 20, 2013	12.6%	12.9%	12.5%	13.8%
10	February 21, 2013	12.4%	13.1%	11.4%	12.5%
11	February 27, 2013	11.8%	13.2%	10.0%	10.7%
12	February 28, 2013	11.0%	11.8%	10.6%	11.8%
13	March 6, 2013	10.0%	10.6%	9.2%	10.8%
14	March 7, 2013	9.9%	11.3%	9.9%	10.8%
15	March 13, 2013	8.8%	9.3%	7.9%	8.8%
16	March 14, 2013	9.0%	8.8%	8.5%	9.1%
17	March 20, 2013	9.3%	10.9%	9.8%	10.9%
18	March 21, 2013	9.5%	10.8%	8.4%	9.0%
19	March 27, 2013	7.9%	8.4%	7.5%	7.7%
20	March 28, 2013	9.0%	9.4%	8.4%	8.6%
Average		12.0%	13.2%	11.4%	12.6%

== Original soundtrack ==
7th Grade Civil Servant OST

Soundtrack album by Various Artists
- Released: March 6, 2013
- Genres: Pop, K-pop, soundtrack, R&B
- Label: Pony Canyon Korea

=== Part 1 ===
Released on January 23, 2013
No.	Title	Artist	Length
1.	"너에게 가는 길" (My Way to You)	Junho featuring Taecyeon	3:25
2.	"너에게 가는 길" (Inst.)	Junho featuring Taecyeon	3:25
Total length:			6:50

=== Part 2 ===
Released on February 6, 2013
No.	Title	Artist	Length
3.	"꽃이 핀다" (Flowers Bloom)	Park Ji-heon of V.O.S	4:09
4.	"Stranger"	Big Baby Driver	2:34
5.	"꽃이 핀다" (Inst.)	Park Ji-heon of V.O.S	4:09
6.	"Stranger" (Inst.)	Big Baby Driver	2:34
Total length:			13:26

=== Part 3 ===
Released on February 14, 2013
No.	Title	Artist	Length
7.	"I'll Be There for You"	Hanbyul (Led Apple)	4:14
8.	"말하지 그랬어" (You Should've Told Me)	SpinEL (스피넬)	4:50
9.	"I'll Be There for You" (Inst.)	Hanbyul (Led Apple)	4:14
10.	"말하지 그랬어" (Inst.)	SpinEL (스피넬)	4:50
Total length:			18:08

=== Part 4 ===
Released on February 20, 2013
No.	Title	Artist	Length
8.	"어떡해" (What To Do?)	Melody Day	3:48
9.	"사랑할 줄 몰라서" (Don't Know How to Love)	Ash Gray	2:52
10.	"어떡해" (Inst.)	Melody Day	3:48
11.	"사랑할 줄 몰라서" (Inst.)	Ash Gray	2:52
Total length:			13:20

== Awards and nominations ==
Year	Award	Category	Recipient	Result
2013	Baeksang Arts Awards	Most Popular Actor (TV)	Hwang Chan-sung	Nominated
2013	Baeksang Arts Awards	Most Popular Actress (TV)	Choi Kang-hee	Nominated
2013	MBC Drama Awards	Top Excellence Award, Actress in a Miniseries	Choi Kang-hee	Nominated
2013	MBC Drama Awards	Excellence Award, Actor in a Miniseries	Joo Won	Won

== International broadcast ==
- Japan: Aired on KNTV beginning March 30, 2013.
- Indonesia: Aired on B-Channel beginning April 3, 2013.
- Malaysia: Aired on TV9 beginning October 9, 2013.
- Thailand: Aired on Workpoint TV beginning December 18, 2013.
- Philippines: Aired on Net 25 beginning February 3, 2014.
- Singapore: Aired on VV Drama beginning June 20, 2015. Also aired on Channel U beginning April 9, 2016.
