= Naeil's Cantabile =

2014 South Korean television series

- Promotional poster
- Also known as: Cantabile Tomorrow
- Genre: Music; Romance; Coming-of-age
- Based on: Nodame Cantabile by Tomoko Ninomiya
- Developed by: KBS Drama Production
- Written by: Park Pil-joo; Shin Jae-won
- Directed by: Han Sang-woo; Lee Jung-mi
- Creative director: Lim Wan-cheol
- Starring: Joo Won; Shim Eun-kyung; Park Bo-gum; Go Kyung-pyo; Baek Yoon-sik
- Ending theme: Listen To My Heart by Melody Day
- Composers: Ha Geun-young; Lee Jong-jin; Kim Yi-seul
- Country of origin: South Korea
- Original language: Korean
- No. of episodes: 16

Production
- Executive producer: Hwang Eui-kyung
- Producers: Kim Jin-won; Park Woo-ram
- Production locations: South Korea; Salzburg
- Cinematography: Park Sung; Kim Yong-soo; Jin Ah-young
- Camera setup: Single camera
- Running time: 60 min
- Production companies: Group Eight; DramaFever

Original release
- Network: KBS2
- Release: October 13 – December 2, 2014

Related
- Nodame Cantabile (2006)

Naeil's Cantabile (Korean: 내일도 칸타빌레; RR: Naeildo kantabille) is a South Korean television series adapted from the Japanese manga Nodame Cantabile by Tomoko Ninomiya. Starring Joo Won and Shim Eun-kyung with Park Bo-gum, Go Kyung-pyo and Baek Yoon-sik, it aired on KBS2 from October 13 to December 2, 2014, for 16 episodes.

It was the second co-production between American digital distribution platform DramaFever and a Korean broadcaster after the success of The Heirs in 2013.

== Cast ==
=== Main ===
- Joo Won as Cha Yoo-jin
  - Choi Kwon-soo as young Yoo-jin
- Shim Eun-kyung as Seol Nae-il
- Park Bo-gum as Lee Yoon-hoo
- Go Kyung-pyo as Yoo Il-rak
- Baek Yoon-sik as Franz Streseman

=== Supporting ===
- Bae Min-jung as Jung Shi-won
- Min Do-hee as Choi Min-hee
- Jang Se-hyun as Ma Soo-min
- Lee Byung-joon as Do Kang-jae
- Kim Yu-mi as Chae Do-kyung
- Ye Ji-won as Song Mi-na
- Ahn Gil-kang as Yoo Won-sang
- Namgung Yeon as Ahn Gun-sung
- Lee Joo-hyung as Gu Sun-jae
- Baek Seo-bin as Han Seung-oh
- Ah Yeon as Son Soo-ji
- Cho Yoon-woo as Lee Jae-yong
- Jung Sung-ah as Lee Dan-ya
- Lee Ah-hyun as Yang Sun-young
- Jeong Bo-seok as Cha Dong-woo
- Bang Eun-hee as Nae-il's mother
- Han Min as Jang Yoo-sung
- Kim Ji-han as Im Jae-jung
- Moon Hee-kyung as Nae-il's ex teacher
- Yoel Levi as Sebastian Viera (cameo, ep 1 & 16)
- Sunwoo Jae-duk as Yoo-jin's uncle (cameo)
- Kim Ji-sook as Chairwoman (cameo)

== Reception ==
The series suffered from low single-digit ratings and was criticized for its weak narrative development and poor acting performance by Shim Eun-kyung. Despite the low ratings, it recorded viewership share as high as over 25% on Tving, a mobile and internet streaming site for live television.

== Ratings ==
Episode #	Original broadcast date	Average audience share			
Episode #	Original broadcast date	TNmS Ratings		AGB Nielsen	
Episode #	Original broadcast date	Nationwide	Seoul National Capital Area	Nationwide	Seoul National Capital Area
1	October 13, 2014	7.7%	9.8%	8.5%	9.5%
2	October 14, 2014	6.9%	8.4%	7.4%	8.0%
3	October 20, 2014	7.5%	8.0%	5.8%	6.7%
4	October 21, 2014	5.2%	5.3%	6.1%	6.9%
5	October 27, 2014	6.9%	7.4%	6.7%	7.7%
6	October 28, 2014	6.0%	6.8%	6.6%	7.2%
7	November 3, 2014	6.0%	6.7%	5.2%	5.9%
8	November 4, 2014	5.9%	6.6%	5.7%	6.1%
9	November 10, 2014	4.8%	5.1%	5.8%	6.3%
10	November 11, 2014	5.2%	6.2%	5.6%	6.1%
11	November 17, 2014	4.3%	5.3%	5.0%	5.5%
12	November 18, 2014	5.9%	6.7%	6.0%	6.7%
13	November 24, 2014	4.0%	5.0%	4.9%	5.2%
14	November 25, 2014	5.0%	5.4%	5.8%	6.5%
15	December 1, 2014	4.1%	5.0%	4.8%	5.7%
16	December 2, 2014	4.8%	8.3%	4.9%	5.4%
Average		5.8%	-	5.9%	6.4%

== Awards and nominations ==
Year	Award	Category	Recipient	Result	Ref.
2014	KBS Drama Awards	Excellence Award, Actor in a Miniseries	Joo Won	Nominated	
2014	KBS Drama Awards	Excellence Award, Actress in a Miniseries	Shim Eun-kyung	Nominated	
2014	KBS Drama Awards	Best New Actor	Park Bo-gum	Nominated	
2014	KBS Drama Awards	Popularity Award, Actor	Joo Won	Won	
2015	4th APAN Star Awards	Top Excellence Award, Actor in a Miniseries	Joo Won	Nominated	
2015	4th APAN Star Awards	Best New Actor	Park Bo-gum	Nominated	

== International broadcast ==
- It began airing in Japan on Fuji TV in February 2015.
- In Thailand aired on PPTV in October 19, 2015.
- In Taiwan aired on GTV in November 5, 2015.
