= Bae Hae-sun =

South Korean actress (born 1974)

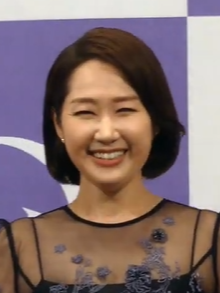
- Bae in July 2019
- Born: Bae Hae-sun; May 8, 1974 (age 52); Seoul, South Korea
- Education: Seoul Institute of the Arts (Theater & Drama)
- Occupations: Actress; model; singer
- Years active: 1995–present
- Agent: Lead Entertainment

Korean name
- Hangul: 배해선
- Hanja: 裴海善
- RR: Bae Haeseon
- MR: Pae Haesŏn
- Website: Lead Entertainment Official Website

Bae Hae-sun (Korean: 배해선; born May 8, 1974) is a South Korean film, television, musical, and stage actress. Bae made her debut in 1995 as an understudy in the play Gone with the Wind. She gradually built her acting career by alternating between small and large theaters, musicals, and plays.

In 2015, she made her television debut with a supporting role as Nurse Hwang in the SBS drama Yong-pal. Bae has since become known for her supporting roles in various television dramas, including Don't Dare to Dream, Judge vs. Judge, A Pledge to God, Hi Bye, Mama!, Hotel del Luna, Happiness, All of Us Are Dead, as well as her lead role in Political Fever.

== Early years ==
Bae Hae-sun was born on May 8, 1974, in Seoul. She grew up in a challenging family environment but showed singing talent from a young age. She would often gather the women in her neighborhood and perform for them, receiving payment in return.

After completing high school, she followed a friend's recommendation and applied to the Seoul Institute of the Arts. During her entrance examination, a professor recognized Bae's singing abilities and encouraged her to pursue this path. One day, while in a car, Bae heard the song "Miss Saigon," which introduced her to the world of musicals. "I had never seen a musical before," Bae recalled, "but the moment I heard the song, I felt excited. I was glad to have discovered a genre that allowed me to combine music and acting and share it with others."

== Career ==
=== Debut (1995–2000) ===
Bae Hae-sun made her professional theater debut in 1995 while in her second year of college. She was cast as an understudy for the role of Scarlett O'Hara in the play Gone with the Wind, directed by her late professor, Kim Hyo-kyung. dPark Sang-ah performed the lead role, with Lee Deok-hwa and Kim Kap-soo playing Rhett Butler and Ashley, respectively. The production ran at the Grand Theater of the Sejong Center for the Performing Arts from July 29 to August 2, 1995. Bae did not perform in any shows, as Park Sang-ah appeared for all performances.

Following her understudy debut, Bae pursued an acting career by joining the You Theater troupe (극단 "유 you"). Her first significant professional stage role came in February 1997 in the play Taxi Driver, written and directed by Jang Jin. In the play, Bae portrayed Hwa-yi, a former lover of Deok-bae (played by Choi Min-sik) who becomes a taxi passenger.

Subsequently, Bae performed a chorus role in Leo Tolstoy's play Holstomer - The Story of a Horse, presented at Hoam Art Hall from May 10 to June 1, 1997. In October of the same year, she reprised her role as Hwa-yi in the (21st) Seoul Theater Festival's Taxi Driver - Where Are You Going?. Her next role was in 1998, playing Marianne A in Molière's L'Avare at Culture and Art Hall Small Theater, which ran from February 21 to March 13, 1998. Also in 1998, Bae took on the role of Gannan in the musical Sworn Brother, directed by Kim Min-ki. At age 25, she portrayed a housemaid who discovers she is pregnant with twins and faces challenges raising multiple children.

=== Career as musical and stage actress (2000–2014) ===
In 2000, Bae joined the theater company Hakjeon (CEO Kim Min-ki) and began her career as a musical actress. She started as an ensemble cast member in the musical Subway Line 1, which earned her a nomination for the Best Rookie Award at the 2001 Korean Musical Awards. Later that year, Bae played Serena in the musical Fame at LG Arts Center from September 29 to October 15, 2000.

In 2001, Bae acted as Bae Jang-hwa in Jeong Bok-geun's play Bae Jang-hwa Bae Hong-ryeon (directed by Han Tae-sook), performed at the small theater of the Dongsung-dong Literature Center in Seoul. She also collaborated with the You Troupe again in the play A Midsummer Night's Dream, where she played Puck.

In 2002, Bae performed in the musical The Rehearsal, held at the Mesa Popcorn Hall in Namdaemun from January 26 to February 17. Bae won the Best Rookie Actress Award at the 8th Korean Musical Awards for this performance. She then played a role in the musical Cheoyoung. In the middle of 2002, Bae was selected as Annette in musical Saturday Night Fever. During practice, she sustained a right ankle ligament injury. Despite the injury, she participated in practice with a cast for over two months, focusing on singing and acting. Bae said, "Six months ago, it was hell. I like to dance in this work, but I might never be able to dance again. I was so painful because of anxiety. But the role of Annette is better than dancing. Yoon Seok-hwa's encouragement and rebuke that singing and acting are more important. I put it out." She overcame her injury and subsequently performed in lead roles on larger stages.

The following year, Bae joined the 20th-anniversary production of the rock musical Subway Line 1 by the theater company Hakjeon. Hakjeon had a reputation as an "Actor's Academy," having launched the careers of many actors, including Sul Kyung-gu, Bang Eun-jin, Cho Seung-woo, Jang Hyun-sung, and Hwang Jung-min. The production ran from November 5 to 8, 2003, at the Grand Theater of the Seoul Daehak-ro Literature Promotion Agency. Also in 2003, Bae was cast as Sophie in the musical Mamma Mia! She initially auditioned for a different role but was given the lead role by the directors due to her acting. This role became significant in her career as a lead actress in major musical productions. The Korean premiere of Mamma Mia! was held at the Seoul Arts Center Opera Theater from January to April 2003, attracting a total audience of 200,000 and earning 14 billion won.

In 2004, Bae starred in the encore performance of Saturday Night Fever. Later that autumn, she appeared as the main character in the musical Crazy for You, a Broadway production choreographed by Susan Stroman. Performances were held at the Sejong Performing Arts Center and ran until October 3, 2004. In December 2004, Bae reprised her role as Sophie in Mamma Mia!. This production opened at the Daegu Opera House on January 15, 2005, and ran for approximately six weeks, with around 50 shows.

Bae, alongside Moon Hye-young, was double-cast as Susan in the Korean production of the musical Tick, Tick... Boom!. Directed by Shim Jae-chan, the production ran from May 23 to 29, 2005. This was the first in the "Musical Favorites" series by Shinshi Musical Company to commemorate the opening of the New City Musical Theater in Daehak-ro. Bae received praise for her acting. Later in 2005, Bae initially auditioned for the role of Aida but was cast as Amneris in the first Korean premiere of the musical Aida. Her performance in this production earned her the Best Actress Award at the 11th Korean Musical Awards in 2005.

From 'Mamma Mia' last year to 'Aida', I just looked ahead, and I think you acknowledged that. 'Amneris' is a person who needs to strike a balance between youthfulness and seriousness, so it's not easy to digest, but it's a very attractive character. I did a lot of research in my own way.

— Bae Hae-sun, Korean Musical Award Interview

In 2006, Bae played Camille Claudel in the musical Camille Claudel. This musical depicted Camille Claudel, a 19th-century French sculptor and associate of Rodin, who experienced personal and artistic struggles before spending 30 years in a psychiatric hospital. The Korean premiere, the fifth work in the "Musical Favorites" series by Sinsie, began its open run on July 7, 2006, at the Daehakro Shinshi Musical Theater. In late 2006, Bae and Kim Seon-yeong were double-cast as Eva Perón in the musical Evita, which opened in November. Evita is a rock opera musical that premiered in London's West End in 1978 and on Broadway in 1979. It recounts the life of Eva Perón, who rose from poverty to become an influential political figure in Argentina.

In 2007, Bae was appointed as an ambassador for The Musical Awards with actor Oh Man-seok. Also in 2007, Bae was triple-cast as Shinda, the lead role in the musical Dancing Shadow, with Kim Bo-kyung and Kim Sung-jo. Shin Sung-rok played the male protagonist, Solomon. Produced by Shinshi Musical Company, Dancing Shadowwas based on a play by Cha Beom-seok and was initially planned in 1999. The musical script was written by Ariel Dorfman, with music commissioned from Eric Woolfson, and directed by Paul Gerington. The production held a workshop in England in September 2006. Later, Bae and Ock Joo-hyun played Roxie Hart in the first South Korean production of the Broadway musical Chicago. Shinshi Musical Company produced the musical, which ran at the Sejong Center for two weeks from September 18 to 30, 2007.

In 2008, Bae reprised her role as Roxy Hart in an encore performance of the South Korean production of the Broadway musical Chicago. This was followed by a role as a Casino showgirl in Eric Woolfson musical Gambler. In winter 2008, Bae acted as Catholic actress Catherine in the musical The Last 5 Years. The play opened on November 28, 2008, at Chungmu Art Hall in Sindang-dong, Seoul, and ran until February 22, 2009.

Bae returned to the play stage for the first time in eight years in the opening play of the Seoul Theater Festival, Women of Picasso. The play is an omnibus featuring monologues of four women associated with Pablo Picasso (1881–1973), including Bae's character, Francoise, a painter 40 years Picasso's junior. Unlike other women in the play, Francoise is depicted as an independent figure who leaves with her children when Picasso is unfaithful. Women of Picasso was performed at the Towol Theater of the Seoul Arts Center on April 16 and 26, 2009.

In 2009, Bae and Baek Min-jung both played Milady in the musical adaptation of The Three Musketeers. The musical was performed from May 12 to June 21 at the Grand Theater of Chungmu Art Hall.

In 2010, Bae played Nannell Mozart, Wolfgang Amadeus Mozart's older sister, in the Austrian musical Mozart. The musical was performed at the Sejong Center for the Performing Arts in Seoul from February 19 to 21, 2010. It was the first Austrian musical introduced in Korea and portrayed Mozart's musical journey and his relationships with individuals such as his father Leopold, his guardian Archbishop, and Constance.

In 2011, Bae acted the role of Jang Mi-joo in the play Chrysanthemum Fragrance. In 2012, Bae played the role of the daughter-in-law in the Korean production of Bob Goepfert's musical The Memory Show. The musical, which centers on family recovery and the mother-daughter relationship, was performed at Elim Hall in Daehangno, Seoul, from August 28 to November 25, 2012.

Bae acted opposite Park Ho-san in the Kim Min-jung musical Eric Satie. Park Ho-san played Eric Satie, while Bae played Susan. Directed by Park Hye-sun, the musical ran from November 22 to December 1, 2013, at the Grand Theater of Daehak-ro Arts Theater in Dongsung-dong, Seoul.

Asia Bridge Contents Co., Ltd., the performance production company, announced on November 26, 2013, that Agatha would be performed at Dongguk University's Lee Hae-rang Arts Theater starting on December 31, 2013, and running until March 2, 2014.

=== Debut in television (2015–present) ===
After approximately two decades as a stage actress, Bae made her television debut in 2015. She had received television role offers since her early 30s but had declined them due to her theater performance schedule. However, a postponement of a performance due to the MERS outbreak created an opening in her schedule. The SBS drama Yong-pal, written by Jang Hyuk-rin and directed by Oh Jin-seok, sought an actress with strong acting skills who was not widely recognized. Bae was offered a role based on a crew member's recommendation, who had previously seen her acting in the play Scorched Love. Bae's initial on-screen role was Nurse Hwang, a nurse in charge of the 12th-floor VVIP ward, where Han Yeo-jin (played by Kim Tae-hee), the heiress of Hanshin Group, was a patient. Nurse Hwang was characterized by her distinctive behavior, treating the comatose Han Yeo-jin as her exclusive responsibility.

Following her television debut, Bae returned to the stage, performing as Liz in the play Tabasco. This project reunited her with director Park Hye-sun, with whom she had previously collaborated on the musical Eric Satie. The play depicts a middle-aged couple in their 40s, an actress reflecting on past achievements, and an overseas migrant worker concerned about deportation, who examine their lives through the disappearance of their award-winning dog, Tabasco, at a dog show. Theatrical company Sagae Tampa announced on August 14, 2015, that the play would run at Daehangno Arts Theater in Seoul from November 10 to 26, 2015.

In 2016, Bae and Seo Yi-sook shared the role of Juliet's nurse in the play Romeo and Juliet. That same year, Bae portrayed Sophie in Terrence McNally's play Master Class, which is based on the life of opera singer Maria Callas (1923-1977). She performed opposite Yoon Seok-hwa. In autumn 2016, Bae played Dr. Geum Seok-ho in Don't Dare to Dream.

Bae was cast as Dorothy Brock in the 2017 season of the musica 42nd Street. The production presentation for the musical was held at the Millennium Seoul Hilton Grand Ballroom in Jung District, Seoul, on July 17, 2017. Also in 2017, to mark the 20th anniversary of her debut, Bae and two other actors participated in the musical Tick, Tick... Boom! The 2017 Korean production opened at Daehak-ro TOM on August 29 and ran until October 15, 2017.

In 2018, she appeared in two feature films, On Your Wedding Day and Dark Figure of Crime. Bae then reprised her role as Dorothy Brock in the 2018 season of the Broadway musical 42nd Street. This season concluded on August 19, recording an average seat occupancy rate of 95% and a total of 38 sold-out performances, setting a new record for sold-outs. The production also toured, with performances at the Daejeon Arts Center on August 25, followed by the Sohyang Art Center in Busan, Gumi Culture and Arts Center, and Ulsan Hyundai Arts Center.

In 2019, Bae reunited with Hwang Jung-min after 20 years, starring as Jocasta in the play Oedipus. Her television roles in 2019 included Choi Seo-hee, the room service manager in the drama Hotel del Luna and Lee Gil-ja, a wealthy customer in the drama VIP. Towards the end of 2019, Bae returned to theater, taking on the role of Allan in the play The 100 Year-Old Man Who Climbed Out of the Window and Disappeared. In addition to the 100-year-old Alan, Bae also portrayed other characters, including Franco, Stalin, Song Mei-rin (wife of Chiang Kai-shek), Dr. Eklund (Swedish Institute of Nuclear Physics), and Kim Jong Il.

In 2020, Bae was double-cast with Jung Jae-eun as the wife in Ronald Harwood's 1980 West End and Broadway play, The Dresser. Bae appeared in two consecutive dramas: KBS's drama Memorials and tvN's drama It's Okay to Not Be Okay. In Memorials, Bae played Won Won-jeong, a politician who had served as a spokesperson for the Seoul Metropolitan Government, head of the administrative bureau, head of the Planning and Coordination Office, and deputy mayor. In It's Okay to Not Be Okay, she portrayed Kang Eun-ja, a patient with psychotic depression. In May 2020, it was announced that Bae would reprise her role as Dorothy Brock in the Broadway musical 42nd Street, running from June 20 to August 23, 2020. The 2020 season of 42nd Street garnered increased attention as it was staged at the Charlotte Theater for the first time in ten years. In the SBS drama Alice, Bae played Kim In-sook, a character traumatized by the loss of her son, who had a congenital heart defect, but who raises Jin-gyeom (played by Joo Won) as her own son after her husband brings him home.

In 2021, Bae played the antagonist Oh Yeon-ok, a representative of Building 101 living in unit 1202, in the TVING Original Series Happiness. Also in 2021, Bae starred as the title character Cha Jeong-won, a former prosecutor and conservative opposition lawmaker, in the drama Political Fever.

In 2022, Bae was cast as Park Eun-hee, a member of the National Assembly, in Netflix Original Series All of Us Are Dead. In September 2022, Bae signed an exclusive contract with Lead Entertainment. Later that year, Bae reprised her role as Dorothy Brock in the 26th-anniversary production of the musical 42nd Street. The Seoul run at the CJ Towol Theater (November 5, 2022 – January 15, 2023) achieved a sold-out record. Bae also participated in the 2022 regional tour, with performances across multiple cities including Busan, Goyang, Changwon, and other cities from February to April.

== Filmography ==
=== Film ===
Film works of Bae Hae-sun
Year	Title		Role	Ref.
Year	English	Korean	Role	Ref.
2002	Who are You?	가위	Soo-hyun	
2018	On Your Wedding Day	너의 결혼식	Seung-hee's mother	
2018	Dark Figure of Crime	암수살인	Park Mi-young	
2019	Svaha: The Sixth Finger	암수살인	Autopsy doctor	
2019	Romang	사바하	Kim Jung-hee	
2019	Long Live The King: Mokpo Hero	롱 리브 더 킹: 목포 영웅	No Gap-soon	
2020	Innocence	결백	Mayor Choo's wife	
2020	Samjin Company English Class	삼진그룹 영어토익반	Ban Eun-kyung	
2021	A Year-End Medley	해피 뉴 이어	Jung Mi-sook	
2022	Honest Candidate 2	정직한 후보2	Park Kwon-ja	
2024	The Roundup: Punishment	범죄도시4	Sung-jae's mother	

=== Television series ===
Television works of Bae Hae-sun
Year	Title		Role	Note	Ref.
Year	English	Korean	Role	Note	Ref.
2015	Yong-pal	용팔이	Ms. Hwang	Debut (supporting role)	
2016	Don't Dare to Dream	질투의 화신	Doctor Geum Suk-ho		
2017	Man Who Dies to Live	죽어야 사는 남자	Wang Mi-ran		
2017	Distorted	조작	Choi Su-yeon		
2017	While You Were Sleeping	당신이 잠든 사이에	Son Woo-joo		
2017	Judge vs. Judge	이판사판	Moon Yoo-seon		
2018	Wok of Love	기름진 멜로	Nurse		
2018	Exit	엑시트	Woo Jae-hee		
2018	Come and Hug Me	이리와 안아줘	Jeon Yoo-ra		
2018	A Pledge to God	신과의 약속	Oh Seon-joo		
2018	The Hymn of Death	사의찬미	Professor Ueno		
2019	The Secret Life of My Secretary	초면에 사랑합니다	Dr.Park		
2019	Hotel del Luna	호텔 델루나	Choi Hee-seo		
2019	VIP	브이아이피	Gil-ja		
2020	Hi Bye, Mama!	하이바이, 마마!	Sung Mi-ja		
2020	SF8	시네마틱드라마 SF8 - 일주일 만에 사랑할 순 없다	News anchor	(Episode: "Baby It's Over Outside")	
2020	Twenty-Twenty	트웬티 트웬티	Chae Yoon-jung		
2020	Alice	앨리스	Kim In-sook's wife		
2020	It's Okay to Not Be Okay	사이코지만 괜찮아	Kang Eun-ja	(ep. 5-7)	
2020	Memorials	출사표	Won So-jung		
2020	Start-Up	스타트업	Lee Hye-won		
2021	Drama Stage: "Park Seong Shil's Industrial Revolution"	드라마 스테이지 2021 - 박성실 씨의 사차 산업혁명	Lee Hye-young	Main Lead	
2021	Oh My Ladylord	오! 주인님	Jung Sang-eun		
2021	The Penthouse: War in Life 3	펜트하우스 3	Yoon Kyung-eun		
2021	Hometown Cha-Cha-Cha	갯마을 차차차	Head doctor at a dental clinic	Cameo, Ep. 1	
2021	Happiness	해피니스	Oh Yeon-ok		
2022	Why Her	왜 오수재인가	Ji Soon-ok		
2022	Trolley	트롤리	Su-bin's mother		
2022	Love in Contract	월수금화목토	Kim Seong-mi		
2022	Curtain Call	커튼콜	Yoon Jung-sook		
2023	Crash Course in Romance	일타 스캔들	Nam Haeng-ja	Cameo, Ep. 14-16	
2023	Joseon Attorney	조선변호사	Lady Yeon	Cameo	
2023	Numbers	넘버스: 빌딩숲의 감시자들	Ahn Seung-yeon		
2023	See You in My 19th Life	이번 생도 잘 부탁해	Jang Yeon-ok		
2024	Bad Memory Eraser	나쁜 기억 지우개	Jo Yeon-il		
2024	Hierarchy	하이라키	Principal Park Hui-Seon		
2024	Miss Night and Day	낮과 밤이 다른 그녀	Na Ok-hee		
2024	O'PENing: The Nerd's Daughter	덕후의 딸	Lee Mi-suk		
2025	For Eagle Brothers	독수리 5형제를 부탁해!	Jang Mi-ae		
2025	Second Shot at Love	금주를 부탁해	Baek Hye-mi		
2025	Pig Pen	돼지우리	The Owner's wife		

=== Web series ===
List of Web Series
Year	Title		Role	Note	Ref.
Year	English	Korean	Role	Note	Ref.
2021	The Great Shaman Ga Doo-shim	우수무당 가두심	Hyo-shim	Kakao TV Original Series	
2021	Political Fever	이렇게 된 이상 청와대로 간다	Cha Jeong-won	Main Role (Wavve Original Series)	
2022	All of Us Are Dead	지금 우리 학교는	Park Eun-hee	Netflix Original Series	
2022	Big Bet	카지노	Lee Sook-ja	Disney+ Original Series	

=== Television shows ===
Year	Title	Role	Ref.
2023	Big Brother Era	Regular Member	

== Stage ==
=== Musical Concert ===
Concert performances of Bae Hae-sun
Year	Title		Role	Theater	Date	Ref.
Year	English	Korean	Role	Theater	Date	Ref.
2008	Musical gala concert	뮤지컬 갈라콘서트	Singer	Olympic Park Olympic Hall	September 19	
2009	Daegu MBC New Year Concert	대구MBC 신춘음악회	Singer	Daegu Health University Indang Art Hall	February 28	
2009	Pops Concert by Seongnam Philharmonic Orchestra	성남시립교향악단 팝스콘서트	Singer	Seongnam Atrium Grand Theater	August 13	
2009	Highlight song of the musical concert.	뮤지컬콘서트 하이라이트 송	Roxy Heart	Jecheon Cultural Center Grand Performance Hall	November 23	
2009	Gyeonggi Provincial Gugak Orchestra 84th Regular Concert - Year-end Family Concert	경기도립국악단 84회 정기연주회 - 송년가족음악회	Singer	Gyeonggi Art Center Grand Theater	December 21	
2010	Intermission concert	인터미션 콘서트	Singer	Dongdeok Women's University Performing Arts Center	June 11–13	
2010	Kim Junsu Musical Concert Levay with Friends	김준수 뮤지컬 콘서트 Levay with Friends	Singer	Olympic Park Gymnastics Stadium (KSPO DOME)	October 7–10	
2011	Seongnam Symphony Orchestra Economic Reviving Hope Concert - Happiness of Cheonwon	성남시립교향악단 경제살리기 희망콘서트 - 천원의 행복	Singer	Seongnam Art Center Concert Hall	March 24	
2012	Spring party	스프링 파티	Singer	Haneulyeon Theater, Busan Cinema Center	March 23	
2012	2012 Coffee Concert 3	2012 커피콘서트 3	Singer	Incheon Culture and Arts Center Small Performance Hall	May 15	
2012	2012 Tomato 10th Anniversary Performance - Delicious Concert	2012 토마토 개국 10주년 기념 공연 - 맛있는 콘서트	Singer	Sejong Center for Cultural Center Grand Theater	October 30	
2013	Nam Kyung-ju Choi Jung-won's musical gala concert - Daegu	남경주 최정원의 뮤지컬갈라콘서트 - 대구	Singer	Daegu Opera House	April 18	
2013	100 Won Miracle Concert with Sean	션과 함께하는 만원의 기적 콘서트	Singer	Seoul Arts Center Concert Hall	April 24	
2013	Musical Talk Concert Who Am I 7	뮤지컬토크콘서트 Who Am I 7	Singer	Olympus Hall	October 31	
2013	100 Won Miracle Concert with Sean	션과 함께하는 만원의 기적 콘서트	Singer	Mapo Arts Center Art Hall Mac	February 13	
2015	Falling into the Temptation of the City Culture Talk Concert	도시의 유혹에 빠지다문화 토크 콘서트	Singer	Sejong Center M Theater	April 14	
2015	Chamber Music Series 2 with Son Jun-ho	손준호와 함께하는 실내악시리즈 2	Singer	Nowon Culture and Arts Center Grand Hall	September 23	
2018	All That Musical — Bae Hae-sun All That Musical I	올 댓 뮤직 - 배해선의 올 댓 뮤지컬 I	Singer	Lotte Concert Hall	April 16	
2018	Hello Piano Man	헬로우 피아노 맨	Singer	Daehak-ro T.O.M. 2	March 26	
2018	All That Musical — Bae Hae-sun All That Musical II	올 댓 뮤직 - 배해선의 올 댓 뮤지컬 II	Singer	Lotte Concert Hall	June 11	
2018	2018 Starlight Musical Festival	2018 스타라이트 뮤지컬 페스티벌	Singer	Paradise City Incheon	October 20 to 21	

=== Musical ===
Musical play performances
Year	Title		Role	Theater	Date	Ref.
Year	English	Korean	Role	Theater	Date	Ref.
2003	Saturday Night Fever	토요일밤의 열기	Annette	Universal Art Center	April 5 – May 10	
2003	Saturday Night Fever	토요일밤의 열기	Annette	LG Art Center	June 14 – August 23	
2004	Saturday Night Fever	토요일밤의 열기	Sophie	Seoul Arts Center Opera Theater	January 17 – April 24	
2004	Saturday Night Fever	토요일밤의 열기	Stephanie	Seoul Arts Center Opera Theater	July 17 – August 3	
2004	Mamma Mia!	맘마미아	Sophie	Seoul Arts Center Opera Theater	January 17 – April 24	
2004	Crazy for You	크레이지 포유	Polly Baker	Sejong Center Grand Theater	September 15 – October 3	
2005–2006	Aida	아이다	Amneris	LG Arts Center	August 23 – April 20	
2006	Camille Claudel	까미유 끌로델	Camille Claudel	Sinsi Musical Theater	July 7 – August 20	
2006–2007	Evita	에비타	Evita Peron	LG Arts Center	November 17 – February 15	
2007	Dancing Shadow	댄싱 섀도우	Shinda	Seoul Arts Center Opera Theater	July 8 – August 26	
2007	Chicago	시카고	Roxie Hart	Sejong Center Grand Theater	September 18–30	
2007	Tick, Tick Boom!	틱,틱...붐	Susan	Arko Arts Theater Grand Theater	December 7–30	
2008	19 and 80	19 그리고 80	Multi-girls	Seoul Arts Center	January 19 – March 3	
2008	The gambler's	갬블러	Showgirl	LG Art Center	July 10 to August 3	
2008	Chicago	시카고	Roxie Hart	Seongnam Art Center Opera House	June 5 – July 29	
2008	Chicago	시카고	Roxie Hart	Daegu Opera House	September 5–13	
2008	Chicago	시카고	Roxie Hart	Gwangju Culture and Arts Center Grand Theater	October 3–5	
2008–2009	Last Five Ears	라스트 파이브 이어스	Cathy	Chungmu Arts Center Small Theater Blue	November 28 – February 22	
2009	Chicago	시카고	Roxie Hart	Seongnam Art Center Opera House	June 5–29	
2009	The Three Musketeers	삼총사	Milady	Chungmu Arts Center Grand Theater	May 12 – June 21	
2009	The Three Musketeers	삼총사	Milady	Daegu Keimyung Art Center	June 26–28	
2009	Namhansanseong Fortress	남한산성	Mae-hyang	Seongnam Art Center Opera House	October 9 – November 4	
2009	Namhansanseong Fortress	남한산성	Mae-hyang	Gyeonggi Art Center Grand Theater	November 21–22	
2010	Mozart!	모차르트!	Nanell Mozart	Sejong Center Grand Theater	January 20 – February 21	
2010	Mozart!	모차르트!	Nanell Mozart	Changwon Seongsan Art Hall Grand Theater	March 13–14	
2010	Mozart!	모차르트!	Nanell Mozart	Daejeon Arts Center Art Hall	April 23–25	
2010	Mozart!	모차르트!	Nanell Mozart	Gwangju Culture and Arts Center Grand Theater	May 2–5	
2010	Mozart!	모차르트!	Nanell Mozart	Sunrise Theater, Ansan Arts Center	May 21–22	
2011	Mother's song	어머니의 노래	Daughter	Arko Arts Theater Grand Theater	August 22–24	
2011	Wonhyo	원효	Princess Yo-seok	Haeoreum Theater National Theater Korea	November 5–27	
2011	Wonderful Life	원더풀 라이프	Mary	Gyeonggi Arts Center Grand Theater, Suwon	December 12–18	
2011	20th Anniversary Performance of the School Exhibition	학전 20주년 기념공연	Ensemble	Hakjeon Blue Small Theater	March 10–20	
2012	The Memory Show	엄마 The Memory Show	Daughter in law	Daehakro Elim Hall	August 28 – November 25	
2012	My love beside me	내사랑 내곁에	Yun-ju	KEPCO Art Center	December 11 – January 20	
2013	Taehwa River	태화강	Ye-oul	National Theater Haeoreum Theater	June 28–29	
2013	Poetic Workshop	포에틱(Poetic) Workshop	Poet	SEEYA The Project Box	August 28 – November 25	
2013	Erik Satie	에릭사티	Susan	Daehakro Arts Theater Grand Theater	November 22 – December 1	
2013–2014	Agatha	아가사	Agatha Christie	Lee Hae-rang Arts Theater	December 31 – February 23	
2014	Agatha	아가사	Agatha Christie	Yes 24 Stage 2	March 1 – April 27	
2014	Agatha	아가사	Agatha Christie	Project Box View	June 9	
2014	Mozart	모차르트	Nanell Mozart	Sejong Center Grand Theater	June 11 – August 3	
2015	Erik Satie	에릭사티	Susan	Ansan Culture and Arts Center	November 27–29	
2016	Mozart	모차르트	Nanell Mozart	Sejong Center Grand Theater	June 10 to August 7	
2016	Mozart	모차르트	Nanell Mozart	Daegu Keimyung Art Center	August 20 to 21	
2016	Mozart	모차르트	Nanell Mozart	Gwangju Culture and Arts Center Grand Theater	August 27 to 28	
2016	Mozart	모차르트	Nanell Mozart	Gimhae Culture Center Maru Hall	September 3–4	
2017	42nd Street	브로드웨이 42번가	Dorothy Brock	Daesung D Cube Art Center	August 5 – October 8	
2017	Tick, Tick Boom!	틱,틱...붐	Susan	Daehak-ro T.O.M. Hall 1	August 29 – October 15	
2018	42nd Street	브로드웨이 42번가	Dorothy Brock	Seoul Arts Center CJ Towol Theater	June 21 – August 19	
2018	42nd Street	브로드웨이 42번가	Dorothy Brock	Daejeon Arts Center Art Hall	August 20–26	
2018	42nd Street	브로드웨이 42번가	Dorothy Brock	Busan Centum City Sohyang Theater Shinhan Card Hall	September 15–16	
2018	42nd Street	브로드웨이 42번가	Dorothy Brock	Ulsan Contemporary Art Center Grand Hall	October 12–13	
2019	Shower	소나기	Girl	Busan Cultural Center Central Theater	August 30	
2019	Shower	소나기	Girl	Seongnam Arts Center Opera Hall	August 28	
2019	Shower	소나기	Girl	Mapo Arts Center Art Hall Mac	July 31	
2020	42nd Street	브로드웨이 42번가	Dorothy Brock	Charlotte Theater	June 20 – August 23	
2022–2023	42nd Street	브로드웨이 42번가	Dorothy Brock	CJ Towol Theatre, Seoul Arts Center	November 5 – January 15	
2023–2024	The Devil: Faust	더 데빌 : 파우스트	X-Black	Interpark Uniplex	December 5, 2023, to March 3, 2024	

=== Theater ===
Stage play performances
Year	Title		Role	Theater	Date	Ref.
Year	English	Korean	Role	Theater	Date	Ref.
1995	Gone with The Wind	바람과 함께 사라지다	Scarlett O'Hara	You Theater	Understudy	
1997	Taxi Driver - Where are you going?	택시 드리벌 - 당신은 어디까지 가십니까?	Hwa-yi	Arts and Culture Center Small Theater	February 27 – March 18	
1997	(21st) Seoul Theater Festival: Taxi Driver - Where are you going?	(제21회) 서울연극제: 택시 드리벌 - 당신은 어디까지 가십니까?	Hwa-yi	Arts and Culture Center Small Theater	October 10–15	
2001	A Midsummer Night's Dream	한여름 밤의 꿈 - 우리 슬픈 이야기	Puck	You Theater	May 25 – July 1	
2009	2009 Seoul Theater Festival - Picasso's Women	2009 서울연극제 - 피카소의 여인들	Francesca	Seoul Arts Center CJ Towol Theater	April 16–26	
2010	I am You	나는 너다	Kim Ah-ryeo	National Theater Sky Theater	July 21 – August 22	
2010	Love Play	연애희곡	Mayumi Taniyama	Chungmu Art Center Small Theater Blue	September 4 – October 31	
2011	I am You	나는 너다	Kim Ah-ryeo	Seoul Arts Center CJ Towol Theater	May 17 – June 6	
2011	I am You	나는 너다	Kim Ah-ryeo	Jeju Art Center	June 24–25	
2011	Please Look After Mom	친정엄마	Daughter	Seoul Arts Center CJ Towol Theater My mother in the play.	March 25 – April 17	
2011	Please Look After Mom	친정엄마	Daughter	MBC Hall in Changwon, South Gyeongsang Province	May 14–15	
2011	Please Look After Mom	친정엄마	Daughter	Busan Civic Center Grand Theater	May 7–8	
2011	Please Look After Mom	친정엄마	Daughter	Theater M of Sejong Center for the Performing Arts	January 28 – March 6	
2012	Scorched Love	그을린 사랑	Female	Myeongdong Arts Theater	June 5 to July 1	
2014	Take Care of Mom	친정엄마	Daughter	Bupyeong Art Center Dalnuri Theater	March 27	
2014	Ivanov of France	이바노프	Babakina	Daehakro Art Theater Grand Theater Station	July 10–20	
2014–2015	I am You	나는 너다	Kim Ah-ryeo	BBCH Hall, Gwanglim Art Center	November 27 – January 31	
2014–2015	Melodrama	멜로드라마	Gangseo-gu	Seoul Arts Center Free Small Theater	December 31 – February 15	
2015	Tabasco	타바스코	Liz	Daehakro Arts Theater Small Theater	September 10–26	
2015–2016	The Curious Incident of the Dog in the Night-Time	한밤중에 개에게 일어난 의문의 사건	Teacher Shioban	Gwanglim Art Center BBCH Hall	November 27 – February 6	
2016	An old law	고제		Daehakro Arts Theater Small Theater	February 1–14	
2016	Master Class	마스터 클래스	Sophie	LG Art Center	March 10–20	
2016	Master Class	마스터 클래스	Sophie	Daegu Bongsan Cultural Center Grand Performance Hall (Gaon Hall)	April 29–30	
2016	Master Class	마스터 클래스	Sophie	Busan Civic Center Grand Theater	April 20–21	
2016	The Elder Theater Festival - The Woman's Oppressive Mother	원로연극제 - 그 여자 억척어멈	Bae Su-ryeon	Arco Art Center Small Theater	Juni 3–17	
2016	Two Rooms	두 개의 방	Ellen	Seoul Arts Center Jayu Small Theater	October 20 – November 13	
2016–2017	Romeo and Juliet	로미오와 줄리엣	Nanny	National Theater Daloreum Theater	December 9 – January 13	
2017	Romeo and Juliet	로미오와 줄리엣	Nanny	Gunpo Culture and Arts Center Suri Hall (Grand Performance Hall)	January 21–22	
2017	Romeo and Juliet	로미오와 줄리엣	Nanny	Daejeong Woosoong Arts Center	February 4–5	
2017	Romeo and Juliet	로미오와 줄리엣	Nanny	Suseong Artpia Grand Theater (Yongji Hall)	February 18–19	
2017	Romeo and Juliet	로미오와 줄리엣	Nanny	Andong Culture and Arts Center Woongbu Hall	February 25–26	
2019	Oedipus	오이디푸스	Jocasta	Seoul Arts Center CJ Towol Theater	January 29 – February 24	
2019	Oedipus	오이디푸스	Jocasta	Korean Sound Culture Center Moakdang Jeonju	March 8–9	
2019	Oedipus	오이디푸스	Jocasta	Gwangju Culture and Arts Center Grand Theater	March 15–17	
2019	Oedipus	오이디푸스	Jocasta	Guri Art Hall Cosmos Grand Theater	March 22–23	
2019	Oedipus	오이디푸스	Jocasta	GS Caltex Yeulmaru Grand Theater Yeosu	March 29–31	
2019	Oedipus	오이디푸스	Jocasta	Ulsan Culture and Arts Center Grand Concert Hall	April 5–6	
2019–2020	The 100 Year Old Man Who Climbed Out the Window and Disappeared	창문 넘어 도망친 100세 노인연극열전	Alan	Artone Theater Hall 2	November 26 – February 2	
2020	The Dresser	더 드레서	Wife	National Jeongdong Theater Seoul	November 18 – December 5	

== Discography ==
=== Audiobook ===
Audiobook(s) by Bae Hae-sun
Year	Title		Published Date	Ref.
Year	English	Korean	Published Date	Ref.
2019	Song Byeong-soo's Shori Kim read by Bae Hae-sun	배해선이 읽는 송병수의 쑈리 킴	2019-07-23	
2021	Yellow Wallpaper by Charlotte Perkins Gilman, read by Bae Hae-sun	배해선이 읽는 샬럿 퍼킨스 길먼의 노란 벽지	2021-07-14	

=== Ensemble recording ===
Title	Year	Peak chart positions	Album
Title	Year	KOR	Album
"That Person" (그 사람)	2010	—	Intermission
"Sleep, sleep, my baby" (자장자장 우리아기)	2020	—	2020 Children's Hospital Healing Play
"Sleep, sleep, my baby Instrumental" (자장자장 우리아기 Inst.)	2020	—	2020 Children's Hospital Healing Play
"—" denotes releases that did not chart or were not released in that region.

=== Cast recording ===
Title	Year	Peak chart positions	Album
Title	Year	KOR	Album
"The prince is gone" (왕자는 떠났네)	2010	—	Mozart cast recording
"Reminiscene" (회상) With Hwang Seong-hyeon, Kim Ji-hwi	2017	—	Agatha cast recording
"Labyrinth" (라비린토스) With Park Han-geun	2017	—	Agatha cast recording
"Into the Dream" (꿈 속으로) With Hwang Seong-hyeon, Park Han-geun	2017	—	Agatha cast recording
"When I See You at First" (처음 봤을때) With Hwang Seong-hyeon, Han Se-ra, Jin Seon-gyu	2017	—	Agatha cast recording
"I Want to Kill You" (널 죽이고 싶어) With Kim Soo-young, Yoon Na-mu	2017	—	Agatha cast recording
"I Want to Kill You" (널 죽이고 싶어) With Kim Ji-hwi, Park In-bae	2017	—	Agatha cast recording
"I Want to Kill You Vari." (널 죽이고 싶어 Vari.) With Kim Park In-bae	2017	—	Agatha cast recording
"What is fear" (두려움이란 건) With Park Han-geun	2017	—	Agatha cast recording
"—" denotes releases that did not chart or were not released in that region.

=== Soundtrack appearances ===
Title	Year	Peak chart positions	Album
Title	Year	KOR	Album
"Longing" (그리움)	2009	—	The Return of Iljimae OST
"—" denotes releases that did not chart or were not released in that region.

== Ambassadorship ==
Title	Year	Ref.
Ambassador of The Musical Awards	2007	

== Awards and nominations ==
Year	Award	Category	Nominee / Work	Result	Ref.
2001	7th Korea Musical Awards	Female Rookie Award	Subway Line	Nominated	
2002	8th Korea Musical Awards	Female Rookie Award	The Rehearsal	Won	
2004	10th Korea Musical Awards	Best Actress	Mamma Mia!	Nominated	
2005	11th Korea Musical Awards	Best Actress	Aida	Won	
2006	International Musical Festival Awards	Popular Star Award	Mamma Mia!	Won	
2006	12th Korea Musical Awards	Best Actress	Camille Claudel	Nominated	
2007	13th Korea Musical Awards	Best Supporting Actress	Dancing Shadow	Nominated	
2008	14th Korea Musical Awards	Best Actress	Chicago	Nominated	
2009	3rd Daegu International Music Festival Awards	Best Supporting Actress	Three Musketeers	Won	
2015	2015 SBS Drama Awards	Special Actress Award for Mini Series	Yong-pal	Nominated	
2016	SBS Drama Awards	Special Acting Award, Actress in a Romantic Comedy Drama	Don't Dare to Dream	Nominated	
2016	Stage Talk Audience's Choice Awards (SACA) (Note: StageTalk Audience's Choice Awards (SACA) is theater and musical award festival that decides the winner based on pure votes from fans of the performance.)	Supporting actress in a play	Goje; Two Rooms; Master Class; The Curious Incident of the Dog in the Nighttime	Nominated	
2022	1st Blue Dragon Series Awards	Best Supporting Actress	Happiness	Nominated	
2023	MBC Drama Awards	Best Supporting Actress	Numbers	Nominated	
