= Alice (South Korean TV series) =

2020 South Korean sci-fi television series

- Promotional poster
- Hangul: 앨리스
- RR: Aelriseu
- MR: Aellisŭ
- Genre: Science fiction; Romance
- Developed by: SBS TV
- Written by: Kim Kyu-won; Kang Cheol-gyu; Kim Ga-yeong
- Directed by: Baek Soo-chan
- Starring: Kim Hee-sun; Joo Won
- Music by: SBS Contents Hub Urbane Music
- Country of origin: South Korea
- Original language: Korean
- No. of episodes: 16

Production
- Producer: Han Jeong-hwan
- Running time: 70 minutes
- Production company: Studio S (SBS)

Original release
- Network: SBS TV
- Release: August 28 – October 24, 2020

Alice (Korean: 앨리스) is a 2020 South Korean television series starring Kim Hee-sun and Joo Won. It aired on SBS from August 28 to October 24, 2020, every Friday and Saturday at 22:00 (KST). It is described as "a human sci-fi drama about a magical time travel of a woman who resembles a dead woman and a man who lost his emotions".

== Synopsis ==
In the year 2050, Alice (temporal agency) specializes in sending clients back through time to see dead loved ones find peace and closure; they also police time incursions. Alice agents Yoon Tae-yi (Kim Hee-sun) and Yoo Min-hyuk (Kwak Si-yang) travelled to the year 1992 Seoul to search for The Book of Prophecy (a book that predicts the fates of certain people and the end of time travel) and found it. However, Lee Se-hoon (Park In-soo), an agent of the mysterious Teacher (a rogue group that wants to continue manipulating time), found the young Tae-yi and murdered her father for the book. Before her father died, he gave the final page to little Tae-yi before her adult counterpart arrived. Tae-yi and Min-hyuk acquired the book and had local police arrest Se-hoon. When Tae-yi realized she was pregnant, Min-hyuk (the father) encouraged Tae-yi to abort the child as time traveling (radiation) would cause serious defects. Tae-yi then disappeared with the book to carry her child.

Tae-yi would rename herself Park Sun-young and single-handedly raised her son, Park Jin-gyeom (Joo Won). Born with Alexithymia, he has difficulty recognizing his own emotions and his classmates called him a psychopath. He unknowingly has the ability to manipulate time in life-and-death situations. In 2010, Jin-gyeom found his mother murdered and vowed to find her killer. Orphaned without a family, Detective Go Hyeon-seok (Kim Sang-ho) and classmate Kim Do-yeon (Lee Da-in) looked after him. By 2020, Jin-gyeom becomes a detective under Hyeon-seok and learns about time travelers, Alice, the Teacher, and the truth behind his mother's death.

== Cast ==
=== Main ===
- Kim Hee-sun as Yoon Tae-yi / Park Sun-young
  - Kim Ji-yu as young Tae-yi

Park Sun-young is a woman with a mysterious past who lives with her son. She died in a mysterious circumstance and left an eerie instruction to her son. Yoon Tae-yi is a genius physicist who has a striking resemblance to Park Sun-young. She encounters Park Jin-gyeom due to a mysterious case and decides to help him uncover the truth.

- Joo Won as Park Jin-gyeom
  - Moon Joo-won as child Park Jin-gyeom (Ep. 1)
  - Moon Woo-jin as young Park Jin-gyeom (Ep. 1, 7)

Park Jin-gyeom was born without the ability to feel or express emotions. He was raised by his single mother who was the only person he cared about. He becomes a detective with the help of Go Hyeon-seok. While investigating mysterious cases, he stumbles upon time travelers.

=== Supporting ===
- Kwak Si-yang as Yoo Min-hyuk

A passionate agent of Alice and time traveler, Yoo Min-hyuk gave up the most important person in his life for Alice. He is very skilled and does his job proficiently. He faces trouble with the police when one of his clients decides to break an important time-traveling rule.

- Lee Da-in as Kim Do-yeon

Park Jin-gyeom's only friend, Kim Do-yeon is a reporter for Sekyung Ilbo News and has a crush on Jin-gyeom since high school. She is investigating a mysterious case involving strange drones.

- Kim Sang-ho as Go Hyeon-seok

A senior detective and team leader of the investigation team. He was in charge of Park Sun-young's murder case. He and his wife took care of Park Jin-gyeom after his mother died.

- Choi Won-young as Seok Oh-won

Director of Kuiper Institute of Advanced Science.

==== People at the Police Station ====
- Lee Jae-yoon as Kim Dong-ho
- Jung Wook as Ha Yong-seok
- Jihyuk as Hong Jeong-wook
- Choi Hong-il as Yoon Jong-soo

==== Alice staff ====
- Kim Kyung-nam as Ki Cheol-am
- Hwang Seung-eon as Oh Shi-young
- Yang Ji-il as Choi Seung-pyo
- Nam Kyung as Jung Hye-soo

==== People around Yoon Tae-yi ====
- Choi Jung-woo as Tae-yi's father
- Oh Young-sil as Tae-yi's mother
- Yeonwoo as Yoon Tae-yeon, Tae-yi's younger sister

==== Others ====
- Bae Hae-sun as Kim In-sook, Go Hyeon-seok's wife.
- Min Jun-ho as Kim Jung-bae, senior reporter of Sekyung Ilbo News.
- Oh Se-young as Si-young
- Lee Su-woong as Jung Ki-hoon, a broker that helps time travelers stay illegally.
- Yoon Joo-man as Joo Hae-min, a serial killer from the future.

=== Special appearances ===
- Jang Hyun-sung as Professor Jang Dong-shik (Ep. 1)
- Park In-soo as Lee Se-hoon, a time traveler who murdered Professor Jang (Ep. 1, 6)
- Oh Yeon-ah as Han Sun-hee, Hong Eun-soo's mother and a time traveler (Ep. 1–4)
- Seo Yi-soo as Hong Eun-soo (Ep. 1–4)
- Lee Seung-hyung as Hong Suk-joon, Hong Eun-soo's father (Ep. 1, 3–4)
- Lee Jung-hyun as Yang Hong-seob, a time traveler who breaks an important rule of Alice (Ep. 2)

== Production ==
This is the first acting role of actor Joo Won since he was discharged from his mandatory military service on February 5, 2019.

On July 31, 2020, SBS released photos from the first script reading of the series attended by the cast and crew of the show.

== Original soundtrack ==
=== Part 1 ===
Released on August 28, 2020
No.	Title	Lyrics	Music	Artist	Length
1.	"Secret"	Park Se-joon, Park Ye-seo, ISHXRK	Park Se-joon, Woo Ji-hoon	Yuju (GFriend) ft. ISHXRK	3:52
2.	"Secret" (Inst.)		Park Se-joon, Woo Ji-hoon		3:52
Total length:					7:44

=== Part 2 ===
Released on September 4, 2020
No.	Title	Lyrics	Music	Artist	Length
1.	"Whenever Wherever Whatever"	Han Kyung-soo (ARTMATIC)	Han Kyung-soo (ARTMATIC), Kiss Me Joy, Choi Min-ju	Ben	3:56
2.	"Whenever Wherever Whatever" (Inst.)		Han Kyung-soo (ARTMATIC), Kiss Me Joy, Choi Min-ju		3:56
Total length:					7:48

== Viewership ==
Alice : South Korea viewers per episode (millions)

Season	Episode number																Average
Season	1	2	3	4	5	6	7	8	9	10	11	12	13	14	15	16	Average
1	1.123	1.773	1.615	2.037	1.585	1.973	1.620	1.929	1.340	1.579	1.433	1.580	1.334	1.697	1.273	1.774	1.604

Source: Audience measurement performed nationwide by Nielsen Korea.

Average TV viewership ratings
Ep.	Part	Original broadcast date	Average audience share (Nielsen Korea)	
Ep.	Part	Original broadcast date	Nationwide	Seoul
1	1	August 28, 2020	4.1% (NR)	N/A
1	2	August 28, 2020	6.1% (15th)	6.3% (16th)
2	1	August 29, 2020	6.4% (NR)	7.0% (15th)
2	2	August 29, 2020	9.2% (5th)	10.2% (5th)
3	1	September 4, 2020	7.2% (8th)	8.1% (7th)
3	2	September 4, 2020	8.4% (6th)	9.8% (3rd)
4	1	September 5, 2020	8.7% (9th)	9.6% (7th)
4	2	September 5, 2020	10.6% (4th)	11.4% (4th)
5	1	September 11, 2020	6.8% (12th)	7.4% (9th)
5	2	September 11, 2020	8.1% (7th)	8.5% (6th)
6	1	September 12, 2020	8.0% (9th)	9.3% (7th)
6	2	September 12, 2020	9.9% (4th)	11.3% (4th)
7	1	September 18, 2020	7.4% (11th)	8.2% (8th)
7	2	September 18, 2020	8.6% (6th)	9.4% (5th)
8	1	September 19, 2020	7.4% (8th)	7.7% (7th)
8	2	September 19, 2020	9.6% (4th)	10.0% (5th)
9	1	September 25, 2020	6.0% (15th)	6.1% (13th)
9	2	September 25, 2020	7.0% (11th)	7.5% (9th)
10	1	September 26, 2020	7.0% (12th)	7.3% (10th)
10	2	September 26, 2020	8.7% (6th)	8.9% (6th)
11	1	October 9, 2020	6.0% (17th)	6.2% (15th)
11	2	October 9, 2020	7.6% (11th)	8.2% (8th)
12	1	October 10, 2020	7.2% (10th)	7.6% (9th)
12	2	October 10, 2020	8.5% (6th)	8.8% (6th)
13	1	October 16, 2020	6.4% (13th)	7.3% (11th)
13	2	October 16, 2020	7.4% (10th)	8.5% (8th)
14	1	October 17, 2020	6.1% (15th)	6.7% (13th)
14	2	October 17, 2020	8.6% (6th)	9.0% (6th)
15	1	October 23, 2020	5.9% (19th)	6.1% (18th)
15	2	October 23, 2020	7.0% (12th)	7.4% (9th)
16	1	October 24, 2020	7.0% (11th)	7.3% (10th)
16	2	October 24, 2020	9.1% (6th)	9.8% (5th)
Average			7.6%	— (Note: Due to some ratings not recorded, the exact average rating is unknown.)
In the table above, the blue numbers represent the lowest ratings and the red numbers represent the highest ratings.; NR denotes that the drama did not rank in the top 20 daily programs on that date.; N/A denotes that the rating is not known.

== Awards and nominations ==
Year	Award	Category	Nominee	Result	Ref.
2020	SBS Drama Awards	Grand Prize (Daesang)	Joo Won	Nominated	
2020	SBS Drama Awards	Grand Prize (Daesang)	Kim Hee-sun	Nominated	
2020	SBS Drama Awards	Producer Award	Joo Won	Won	
2020	SBS Drama Awards	Top Excellence Award, Actor in a Miniseries Fantasy/Romance Drama	Joo Won	Nominated	
2020	SBS Drama Awards	Top Excellence Award, Actress in a Miniseries Fantasy/Romance Drama	Kim Hee-sun	Nominated	
2020	SBS Drama Awards	Excellence Award, Actor in a Miniseries Fantasy/Romance Drama	Kwak Si-yang	Nominated	
2020	SBS Drama Awards	Excellence Award, Actress in a Miniseries Fantasy/Romance Drama	Lee Da-in	Nominated	
2020	SBS Drama Awards	Best Supporting Actor	Kim Sang-ho	Nominated	
2020	7th APAN Star Awards	Top Excellence Award, Best Actress in a Miniseries	Kim Hee-sun	Won	
2021	Seoul International Drama Awards	Outstanding Korean Drama	Alice	Nominated	
