= Melody Day (group) =

South Korean girl group

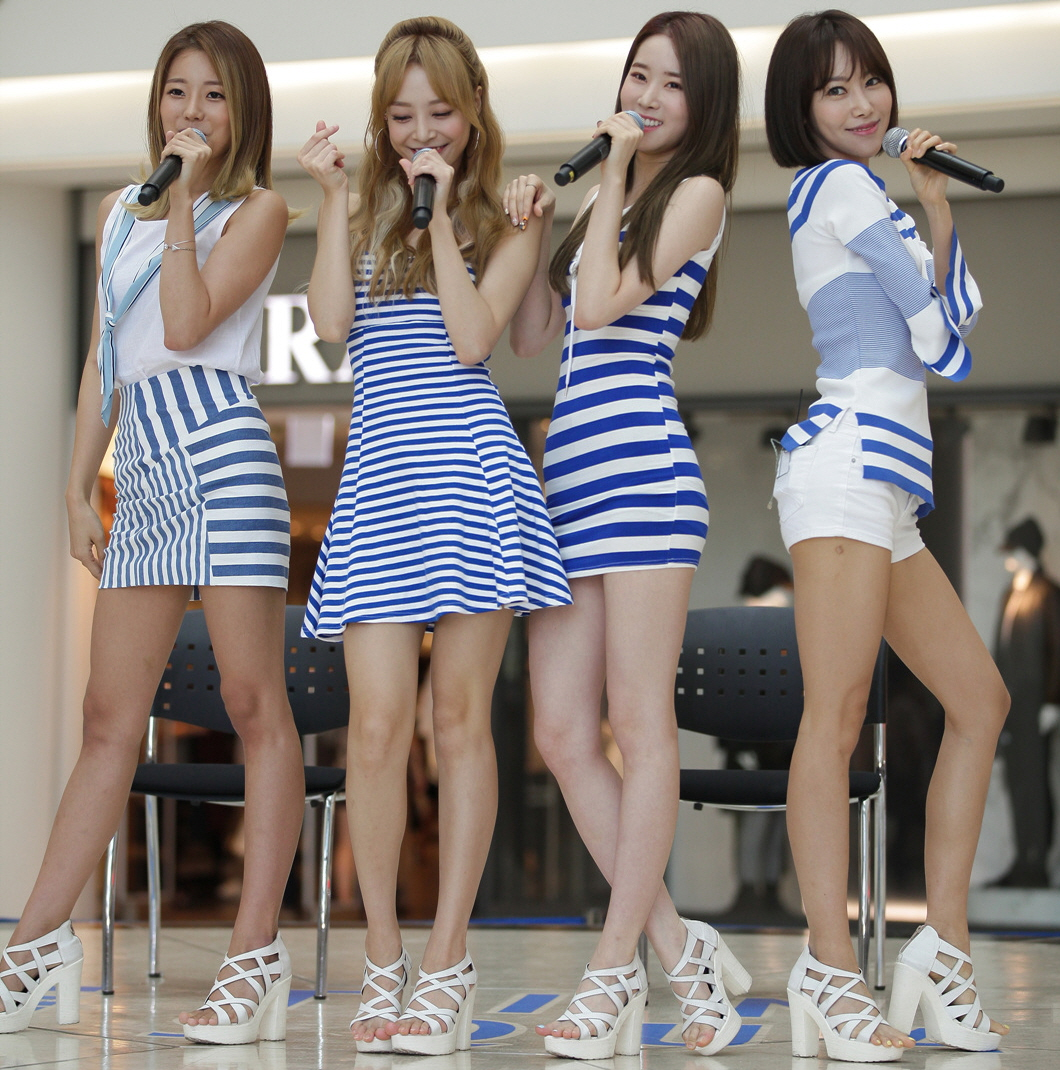
- Melody Day in 2016

Background information
- Origin: Seoul, South Korea
- Genres: K-pop; synthpop; R&B
- Years active: 2012–2018
- Label: Cre.ker Entertainment
- Past members: Yeoeun; Chahee; Yein; Yoomin
- Website: melodyday.co.kr/xe/

Melody Day (Korean: 멜로디데이) was a South Korean girl group formed in 2012. The group officially debuted with their single album Another Parting in February 2014 and with three members: Yeoeun, Chahee, and Yein. The fourth member, Yoomin was added to the group in October 2014. On December 26, 2018, it was confirmed that all four members decided to not renew their contracts with Cre.ker Entertainment, ultimately ending the group.

== History ==
=== 2012–2013: Pre-debut ===
Melody Day started their career as a trio in 2012, featuring on soundtracks for dramas such as Bridal Mask, Cheongdam-dong Alice, Missing You, Seoyoung, My Daughter, The King of Dramas, I Can Hear Your Voice, Master's Sun and Bel Ami. On June 26, 2013, they released the ballad track "Loving Alone" as part of the single album New Wave Studio Rookie, Vol. 1.

=== 2014–2016: Debut, new member Yoomin and further releases ===
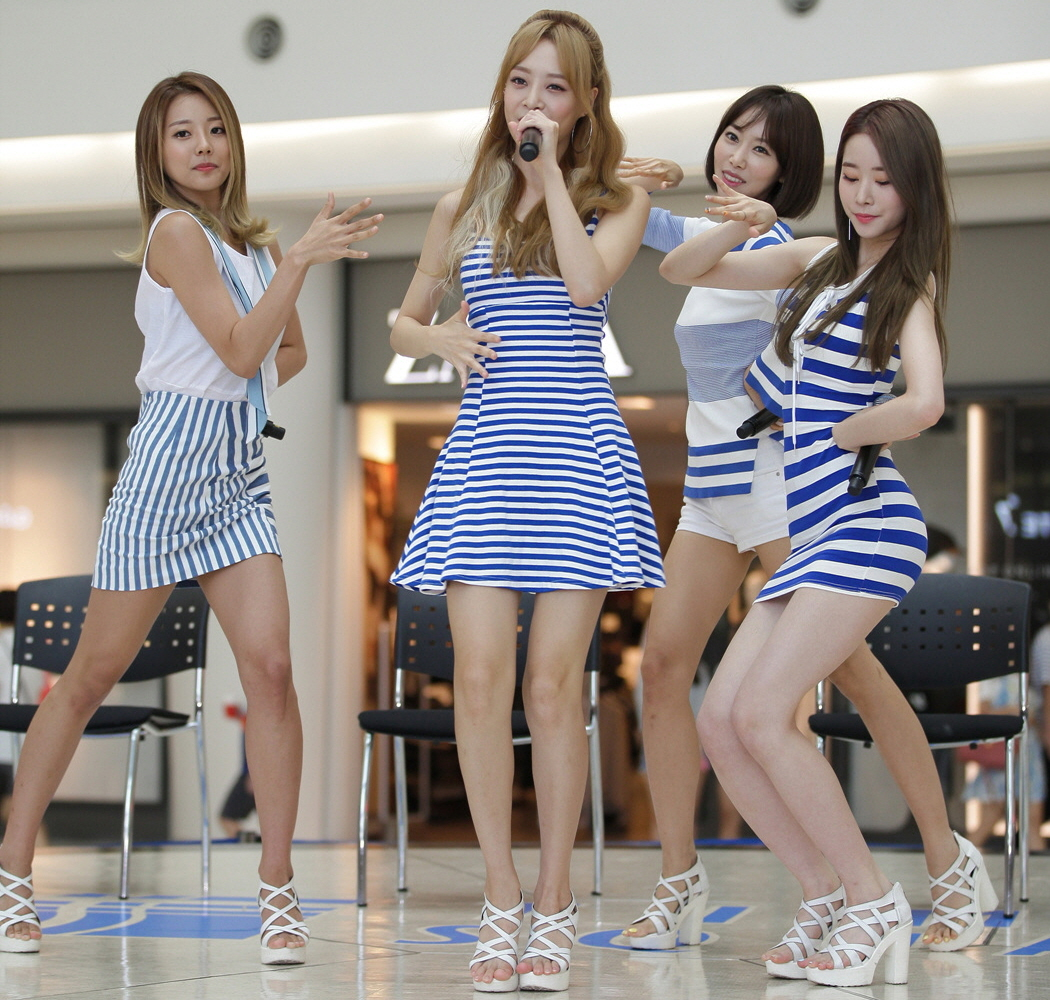
Melody Day during a performance on August 21, 2015.

The group made their official debut on February 25, 2014 with release their debut single album Another Parting. Its music video featured the actors Seo In-guk and Wang Ji-won. The group made their debut stage on music program Music Bank on February 28.

Melody Day released duet project featured 2AM's Changmin titled "The Very Last First" were released on May 21 and featured CNBLUE's Lee Jong-hyun titled "To Tell You The Truth" were released on August 14. They released the original soundtrack for the drama You Are My Destiny with the single "You're My Everything", a remake of Jeff Bernat's "Be The One".

In October, Melody Day officially introduced their fourth member: Yoomin. The group released their first song as four member, "Listen to My Heart" for the drama Naeil's Cantabile. On December 12, Melody Day released their first digital single "Anxious" featuring popular rapper Mad Clown.

Melody Day's second single album #LoveMe was released on June 9, 2015. They continue with released their third single album Speed Up on October 7. Their comeback showcase was held at the Ilji Art Hall on the same day as the album's release. On December 28, Melody Day released their second digital single "When It Rains" featuring VIXX's rapper Ravi.

Melody Day released their first mini album Color on July 1, 2016, with a total of six tracks including the lead single "Color" and previous digital "When It Rains". In December 2016, Melody Day recorded the original soundtrack song "Beautiful Day" for the web drama 7 First Kisses.

=== 2017–2018: Kiss on the Lips, Restless and disbandment ===
Melody Day released their third digital single "You Seem Busy" featuring BtoB's Ilhoon, on January 25, 2017. The song was produced by Polar Bear and its lyrics were penned by JQ and Ilhoon. Melody Day's second mini album, Kiss On The Lips, was released on February 15, where composed of six track including the lead single "Kiss On The Lips" and previous single "You Seem Busy".

On September 25, Cre.Ker Entertainment confirmed that Yeoeun, Yoomin, and Chahee had participated in competition show The Unit. On the finale round, Chahee ranked 16th, Yeoeun ranked 18th and they failed to entered the winning group line-up, as well as Yoomin was eliminated in 31st before final round.

Melody Day released their fourth digital single "Restless" on June 29, 2018.

On December 26, 2018, it was confirmed that all four members decided to not renew their contracts with the label, ultimately ending the group.

== Members ==
- Yeoeun (여은) – leader, main vocal
- Yoomin (유민) – sub vocal, main rapper
- Yein (예인) – lead vocal
- Chahee (차희) – sub vocal

== Discography ==
=== Extended plays ===
Title	Details	Peak chart positions	Sales
Title	Details	KOR	Sales
Color	Released: July 1, 2016; Label: Cre.Ker Entertainment, LOEN Entertainment; Format: CD, digital download; Track listing: 1. Paint Your Love; 2. Color (깔로); 3. Satellite; 4. U (널 느끼고 널 느끼며); 5. Hate (미워 미워 미워); 6. When It Rains (비가 내리면) [feat. Ravi]	24	KOR: 629+
Kiss on the Lips	Released: February 15, 2017; Label: Cre.Ker Entertainment, LOEN Entertainment; Format: CD, digital download; Track listing: 1. Kiss on the Lips; 2. Mix & Match; 3. Common Melody (흔한 멜로디) [feat. JQ]; 4. Like U 5. Gift; 6. You Seem Busy (바빠 보여요) [feat. Ilhoon]	22	KOR: 793+

=== Single albums ===
Title	Details	Peak chart positions	Sales
Title	Details	KOR	Sales
Korean
Another Parting	Released: February 25, 2014; Label: Viewga Entertainment, LOEN Entertainment; Format: CD, digital download; Track listing: 1. Heart in a Bottle (모래시계); 2. Another Parting (어떤 안녕); 3. Heart in a Bottle (모래시계) (Instrumental); 4. Another Parting (어떤 안녕) (Instrumental)	30	KOR: 512+
#LoveMe	Released: June 9, 2015; Label: Viewga Entertainment, Collabodadi, LOEN Entertainment; Format: CD, digital download; Track listing: 1. #LoveMe; 2. Oh, My Guy (feat. Yijeong); 3. Anxious (feat. Mad Clown); 4. #LoveMe (Instrumental)	14	KOR: 987+
Speed Up	Released: October 7, 2015; Label: Viewga Entertainment, LOEN Entertainment; Format: CD, digital download; Track listing: 1. Speed Up; 2. Hallo; 3. Want U Bag	18	KOR: 980+

=== Singles ===
Title	Year	Peak chart positions	Sales	Album
Title	Year	KOR	Sales	Album
"Love Alone" (혼자하는 사랑)	2013	87	KOR: 53,750	New Wave Studio Rookie, Vol. 1
"Another Parting"	2014	69	KOR: 65,015	Another Parting
"Anxious" (feat. Mad Clown)	2014	33	KOR: 89,798	#LoveMe
"#LoveMe"	2015	—	KOR: 28,563	#LoveMe
"Speed Up"	2015	—	KOR: 17,482	Speed Up
"When It Rains" (feat. VIXX's Ravi)	2015	41	KOR: 63,954	Color
"Color" (깔로)	2016	—	KOR: 18,346	Color
"You Seem Busy" (feat. BtoB's Ilhoon)	2017	—	KOR: 14,740	Kiss On The Lips
"Kiss On The Lips"	2017	—	—N/a	Kiss On The Lips
"Restless" (잠은 안 오고)	2018	—	—N/a	Non-album single
"—" denotes releases that did not chart or were not released in that region.

=== Soundtrack appearances ===
Year	Title	Member(s)	Album
2012	"That One Word"	Melody Day	Bridal Mask OST
2012	"Stop Hurting"	Melody Day	Cheongdam-dong Alice OST
2012	"Magic Castle"	Melody Day	Missing You OST
2012	"The Way to Say I Love You"	Melody Day	Golden Time OST
2012	"Like Back Then"	Melody Day	Seoyoung, My Daughter OST
2012	"All Looks Like You"	Melody Day	The King of Dramas OST
2013	"Sweetly Lalala"	Melody Day	I Can Hear Your Voice OST
2013	"All About"	Melody Day	Master's Sun OST
2013	"Only Me"	Yeoeun	Marry Him If You Dare OST
2013	"I Have a Person That I Love"	Melody Day	Bel Ami OST
2013	"Can You Feel Me"	Melody Day	Medical Top Team OST
2013	"What to Do"	Melody Day	7th Grade Civil Servant OST
2014	"I'll Be Waiting"	Melody Day	Hotel King OST
2014	"You're My Everything"	Melody Day	You Are My Destiny OST
2014	"Listen to My Heart"	Melody Day	Naeil's Cantabile OST
2014	"I Can't"	Chahee	Naeil's Cantabile OST
2015	"Love"	Yeoeun	Queen's Flower OST
2015	"Whatever"	Yein	You Will Love Me OST
2016	"Let's Forget It"	Yeoeun	Reply 1988 OST
2016	"If It’s You"	Yeoeun	Beautiful Gong Shim OST
2016	“Without You"	Yeoeun (with N)	W OST
2016	"Love, My Love"	Yeoeun	Father, I'll Take Care of You OST
2016	"Beautiful Day"	Melody Day	7 First Kisses OST
2017	"The Song Of The Star"	Melody Day	Saimdang, Memoir of Colors OST
2017	"Stain"	Chahee	Hospital Ship OST
2017	"Be Confused"	Chahee	Temperature of Love OST
2018	"Let's Go"	Chahee	Gangnam Beauty OST
2018	"Holiday"	Yeoeun	Gangnam Beauty OST

=== Collaborations ===
Year	Song	Member(s)	Artist
2013	"I Don't Know Women"	MelodyDay	Boom
2014	"The Very Last First"	MelodyDay	2AM's Changmin
2014	"To Tell You the Truth"	MelodyDay	CNBLUE's Lee Jong-hyun
2015	"Come to Me"	Yeoeun	Wheesung
2016	"Walkak"	Yeoeun	Baechigi
2016	"Our Time"	=Yein	Postmen's Sungtae
2017	"밥은 먹고 말해요"	Yeoeun	Kim Gi Tae

== Videography ==
=== Music videos ===
Year	Title	Notes
2013	"All About"	Master's Sun OST
2014	"Another Parting"	
2014	"The Very Last First"	featuring 2AM's Changmin
2014	"You're My Everything"	You Are My Destiny OST
2014	"Listen to My Heart"	Naeil's Cantabile OST
2014	"Anxious"	featuring Mad Clown
2015	"#LoveMe"	
2015	"Speed Up"	
2015	"When It Rains"	featuring VIXX's Ravi
2016	"Color"	
2017	"You Seem Busy"	featuring BTOB's Ilhoon
2017	"Kiss On the Lips"	
2018	"Restless"	

== Awards and nominations ==
Year	Award	Category	Recipient	Result
2013	Seoul International Drama Awards	Outstanding Korean Drama OST	"Like Back Then"	Nominated
2014	MelOn Music Awards	Best M/V	"Another Parting"	Won
