= Lee Da-in (actress, born 1992) =

South Korean actress (born 1992)

- Born: Im Yoo-kyung; November 5, 1992 (age 33); Seoul, South Korea
- Education: Hanyang University – Theater and Film
- Occupation: Actress
- Years active: 2013–present
- Agent: 9-Ato Entertainment
- Spouse: Lee Seung-gi (m. 2023)
- Children: 2
- Parent: Kyeon Mi-ri (mother)
- Relatives: Lee Yu-bi (sister)

Korean name
- Hangul: 이라윤
- RR: I Rayun
- MR: I Rayun

Stage name
- Hangul: 이다인
- RR: I Dain
- MR: I Tain

Former name
- Hangul: 임유경
- RR: Im Yugyeong
- MR: Im Yugyŏng

Lee La-yun (Korean: 이라윤; born Im Yoo-kyung on November 5, 1992), known professionally as Lee Da-in (Korean: 이다인) is a South Korean actress.

== Personal life ==
Lee and her older sister Lee Yu-bi are the daughters of actress Kyeon Mi-ri. Their stepfather, Lee Hong-heon, adopted the sisters after marrying Kyeon in 1998. After her mother's remarriage, Lee changed her name from Im Yoo-kyung to Lee Joo-hee. Lee changed her real name, Lee Joo-hee to Lee La-yun ahead of her marriage, but she did not change her stage name.

=== Relationship and marriage ===
Lee has been in a relationship with actor Lee Seung-gi since late 2020. On February 7, 2023, Lee Seung-gi announced their engagement in letters posted on his social media accounts. They married on April 7, 2023, at the Grand Intercontinental Seoul Parnas in presence of friends and family.

On November 1, 2023, her agency confirmed that Lee is pregnant with her first child, and is due to give birth in February 2024. Lee gave birth to their first child, a daughter, on February 5. The couple welcomed a second child, a son, on July 7, 2026.

== Filmography ==
=== Film ===
Year	Title	Role	Ref.
2014	The Fatal Encounter	Soo-ryun (cameo)	
2016	Life Risking Romance	Han Je-in (teens)	

=== Television series ===
Year	Title	Role	Ref.
2014	Twenty Years Old	Kim Hye-rim	
2015	Make a Woman Cry	Park Hyo-jeong	
2016	Entourage	(cameo, episode 7)	
2016–2017	Hwarang: The Poet Warrior Youth	Kim Soo-yeon	
2017–2018	My Golden Life	Choi Seo-hyun	
2018	Come and Hug Me	Lee Yeon-ji	
2018	KBS Drama Special: "The Time Left Between Us"	Yoo Seung-yeon	
2019	Doctor Prisoner	Lee Jae-in	
2020	Alice	Kim Do-yeon	
2023	My Dearest	Kyung Eun-ae	

== Awards and nominations ==
Year	Award	Category	Nominated work	Result	Ref.
2023	MBC Drama Awards	Excellence Award, Actress in a Miniseries	My Dearest	Nominated	
2020	28th SBS Drama Awards	Excellence Award, Actress in a Miniseries Fantasy/Romance Drama	Alice	Nominated	
