= Joo Won =

South Korean actor (born 1987)

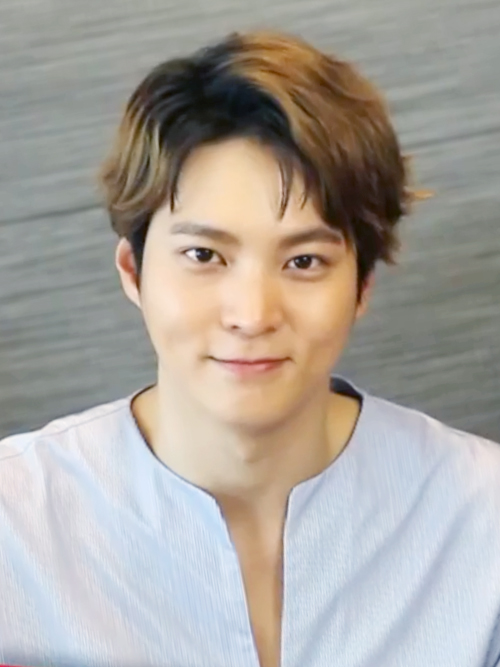
- Joo in May 2017
- Born: Moon Joon-won; September 30, 1987 (age 39); Seoul, South Korea
- Education: Sungkyunkwan University – Film and Television; Konkuk University Graduate School of Mass Communication
- Occupations: Actor; singer
- Years active: 2010–present
- Agent: Ghost Studio

Korean name
- Hangul: 문준원
- Hanja: 文晙原
- RR: Mun Junwon
- MR: Mun Chunwŏn

Stage name
- Hangul: 주원
- Hanja: 周元
- RR: Ju Won
- MR: Chu Wŏn
- Website: joowon508.com

Signature
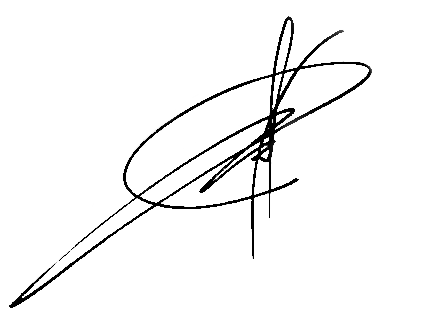

Joo Won (Korean: 주원; born Moon Joon-won on September 30, 1987) is a South Korean actor. He is known for starring in the television series Bread, Love and Dreams (2010), Ojakgyo Family (2011–2012), Bridal Mask (2012), Good Doctor (2013), Yong-pal (2015), and Alice (2020).

== Early life and education ==
Joo Won was born in Seoul, South Korea.

He studied at Kaywon High School of Arts and continued his education on Theatre and Arts in Sungkyunkwan University. In 2013, Joo announced that he would be furthering his studies at Konkuk University.

== Career ==
=== 2006–2009: Beginnings ===
Upon making it into college, Joo Won's father came up with the stage name Joo Won for him as the Hangul pronunciation of the name sounds similar to "God-willing".

With his love for singing, he became involved in Frees, a co-ed television performance group formed by SBS as part of a children's TV program. The show premiered in 2006, but Joo Won left the show quickly thereafter. Joo Won later auditioned for the stage musical Altar Boyz, based on the American musical of the same name. This musical role was a first of many to come, as he later appeared in other musicals, namely Singles, Grease, Sinsangnam and most notably, Spring Awakening.

Originally, Joo Won was the understudy for Melchior in Spring Awakening. However, the original actor who played Melchior left the musical midway through the production, thus allowing Joo Won to perform later on in the production. His performance in Spring Awakening caught the attention of his future agency, Sim Entertainment.

=== 2010–2012: Rising popularity and breakthrough ===
Joo Won first appeared in the 2010 television drama Bread, Love and Dreams as the antagonist to the titular character. King of Baking, Kim Takgu recorded high viewership ratings of over 50%, earning "national drama" status, and Joo shot to fame.

He went on to star in the KBS2 weekend family drama Ojakgyo Family in 2011, opposite Uee. He took home the Best New Actor award at the KBS Drama Awards and Baeksang Arts Awards. The same year, Joo made his big-screen debut in the action crime film S.I.U. alongside Uhm Tae-woong.

However, it was Joo's third small screen project Bridal Mask that truly propelled him to mainstream popularity. He portrayed a pro-Japanese Korean police officer by day and a masked vigilante who fights for Korean independence by night. For his role in Bridal Mask, Joo Won took home the Excellence award and Popularity award at the 2012 KBS Drama Awards. The same year, he starred opposite Park Bo-young in the horror thriller Don't Click, and joined the second season of the popular variety program 2 Days & 1 Night.

=== 2013–2017: Mainstream success ===
In 2013, Joo starred in MBC's drama 7th Grade Civil Servant, based on the action-romance movie My Girlfriend Is an Agent. The same year, Joo was offered his most challenging role; an autistic savant who becomes a genius pediatric surgeon for KBS's medical drama Good Doctor.

After four years of absence from the musical scene, Joo returned to the musical stage with the Korean version of Ghost the Musical. Due to schedule conflicts, he has since stepped down from 2 Days & 1 Night to concentrate on his acting career. In late 2013, Joo starred in the romantic comedy film Steal My Heart opposite Kim Ah-joong.

In 2014, Joo starred in Fashion King, based on a popular webtoon of the same title. He returned to the small screen with Naeil's Cantabile, the Korean adaptation of Nodame Cantabile.

In 2015, Joo starred in action thriller Yong-pal, alongside Kim Tae-hee. The drama garnered strong ratings and Joo won the Grand Prize (Daesang) at the SBS Drama Awards. He next starred in the thriller Fatal Intuition, which opened at the top of the box office, earning more than 1 million ticket sales.

On November 3, 2015, Joo received the "Most Welcomed Actor" award at the second Asian Influence Awards Oriental Ceremony held in China. He then starred in the Korean-Chinese film Sweet Sixteen, a romantic drama based on an Internet novel will depict the love story of three men and one woman.

Joo's final project before enlistment was My Sassy Girl, a historical remake of the 2001 hit film. The television series premiered in 2017.

=== 2019–present: Comeback from military ===
In 2020, Joo returned to television in the SBS science fiction romance drama Alice. In 2022, he starred in the Netflix film Carter in the title role.

In November 2022, Joo signed with Ghost Studio.

== Personal life ==
=== Military service ===
Joo started his mandatory military service on May 16, 2017. In June, the actor completed his six-week basic training and became an assistant instructor for the 3rd Infantry Division.

During the military service, Joo emceed at the Armed Forces Festival 2017. He also participated at the 63rd Memorial Day Commemoration Ceremony on June 6, 2018.

On February 5, 2019, Joo was discharged from the military after completion of 21 months of mandatory military service.

== Filmography ==
Key
†	Denotes films that have not yet been released

=== Film ===
Year	Title	Role	Notes	Ref.
2011	S.I.U.	Kim Ho-ryong		
2012	Don't Click	Joon-hyuk		
2012	Niko 2 : Little Brother, Big Trouble	Niko	Korean dub	
2013	Steal My Heart	Lee Ho-tae		
2014	Fashion King	Woo Ki-myung		
2015	Fatal Intuition	Jang-woo		
2016	Sweet Sixteen	Qu Weiran	Chinese film	
2016	Clocking Out	Seo Ki-woong	Short film	
2022	Carter	Carter	Netflix film	
2024	The Firefighters	Choi Cheol-woong		
2027	The Sword: Rebirth of the Red Wolf †	Gye Pil-haryeok		

=== Television series ===
Year	Title	Role	Notes	Ref.
2010	Bread, Love and Dreams	Gu Ma-jun / Seo Tae-jo		
2011–2012	Ojakgyo Family	Hwang Tae-hee		
2012	Bridal Mask	Lee Kang-to / Sato Hiroshi / Gaksital		
2013	7th Grade Civil Servant	Han Gil-ro / Han Pil-hoon		
2013	Good Doctor	Park Shi-on		
2014	Naeil's Cantabile	Cha Yoo-jin		
2015	Yong-pal	Kim Tae-hyun		
2017	My Sassy Girl	Gyun-woo		
2020	Alice	Park Jin-gyeom		
2023	Stealer: The Treasure Keeper	Hwang Dae-myung / Skunk		
2024	The Midnight Studio	Seo Ki-joo		

=== Television shows ===
Year	Title	Role	Notes	Ref.
2006	Frees	Cast member		
2012–2013	2 Days & 1 Night	Cast member		
2014	Joo Won's Life Log	Himself		

=== Narration ===
Year	Title	Notes	Ref.
2012	Memories of civilization - Map	Four-part series documentary	

=== Music video appearances ===
Year	Title	Artist	Ref.
2010	"Miss You"	SM the Ballad	
2012	"I Made Another Woman Cry"	2BiC	

== Stage ==
=== Musical ===
Musical theatre performances
Year	Title	Role	Notes	Ref.
2007	Altar Boyz	Matthew		
2008	Singles	Ensemble		
2008	Grease	Doody		
2009	Sinsangnam	Yeon Ha-nam		
2009	Spring Awakening	Melchior		
2013–2014; 2020–2021	Ghost the Musical	Sam Wheat		

== Discography ==
=== Soundtrack appearances ===
Title	Year	Album	Ref.
"My Love"	2010	Bread, Love and Dreams OST (Part 7)	
"Judgment Day"	2012	Bridal Mask OST	
"Love and Love"	2012	Bridal Mask OST	
"Nadeshiko"	2012	Bungo: Stories of Desire OST	
"I Don't Know Love"	2013	7th Grade Civil Servant OST	
"Love Medicine" (소독약)	2013	Good Doctor OST	
"If I Were"	2013	Good Doctor OST	
"Innocent"	2014	Naeil's Cantabile OST	
"I Believe"	2017	My Sassy Girl OST	

== Accolades ==
=== Awards and nominations ===
Name of the award ceremony, year presented, category, nominee of the award, and the result of the nomination
Award ceremony	Year	Category	Nominee / Work	Result	Ref.
APAN Star Awards	2013	Top Excellence Award, Actor	Good Doctor	Nominated	
APAN Star Awards	2015	Top Excellence Award, Actor in a Miniseries	Naeil's Cantabile, Yong-pal	Nominated	
APAN Star Awards	2021	Excellence Award, Actor in a Miniseries	Alice	Nominated	
APAN Star Awards	2021	Popular Star Award, Actor	Alice	Nominated	
Asia Model Awards	2011	Special Award – Best New Model	Joo Won	Won	
Asian Influence Awards Oriental Ceremony	2015	Most Influential Asian Award	Joo Won	Won	
Baeksang Arts Awards	2012	Best New Actor – Television	Ojakgyo Family	Won	
Baeksang Arts Awards	2012	Best New Actor – Film	S.I.U.	Nominated	
Baeksang Arts Awards	2014	Best Actor – Television	Good Doctor	Nominated	
Baeksang Arts Awards	2016	Best Actor – Television	Yong-pal	Nominated	
Buil Film Awards	2012	Best New Actor	S.I.U.	Nominated	
K-Drama Star Awards	2012	Excellence Award, Actor	Bridal Mask	Nominated	
KBS Drama Awards	2010	Best New Actor	Bread, Love and Dreams	Nominated	
KBS Drama Awards	2011	Best New Actor	Ojakgyo Family	Won	
KBS Drama Awards	2012	Top Excellence Award, Actor	Bridal Mask	Nominated	
KBS Drama Awards	2012	Excellence Award, Actor in a Serial Drama	Bridal Mask	Won	
KBS Drama Awards	2012	Popularity Award	Bridal Mask	Won	
KBS Drama Awards	2013	Top Excellence Award, Actor	Good Doctor	Won	
KBS Drama Awards	2013	Excellence Award, Actor in a Mid-length Drama	Good Doctor	Nominated	
KBS Drama Awards	2013	Netizens' Award	Good Doctor	Won	
KBS Drama Awards	2013	PD Award (Note: The winner of this award was chosen by producers from KBS, SBS and MBC)	Good Doctor	Won	
KBS Drama Awards	2013	Best Couple Award	Joo Won (with Moon Chae-won); Good Doctor	Won	
KBS Drama Awards	2014	Excellence Award, Actor in a Miniseries	Naeil's Cantabile	Nominated	
KBS Drama Awards	2014	Popularity Award, Actor	Naeil's Cantabile	Won	
KBS Entertainment Awards	2012	Best Newcomer in a Variety Show	2 Days & 1 Night	Won	
Korea Drama Awards	2013	Top Excellence Award, Actor	Good Doctor	Nominated	
Korea Drama Awards	2015	Grand Prize (Daesang)	Yong-pal	Nominated	
Korea Producers & Directors Awards	2014	Best Performer	Good Doctor	Won	
Korean Culture and Entertainment Awards	2012	Top Excellence Award, Actor	Bridal Mask	Nominated	
Korea Musical Awards	2009	Best New Actor	Spring Awakening	Nominated	
MBC Drama Awards	2013	Excellence Award, Actor in a Miniseries	7th Grade Civil Servant	Won	
The Musical Awards	2010	Best New actor	Spring Awakening	Nominated	
SBS Drama Awards	2015	Grand Prize (Daesang)	Yong-pal	Won	
SBS Drama Awards	2015	Top Excellence Award, Actor in a Miniseries	Yong-pal	Nominated	
SBS Drama Awards	2015	Top 10 Stars	Yong-pal	Won	
SBS Drama Awards	2015	Chinese Netizen Popularity Award	Yong-pal	Won	
SBS Drama Awards	2015	Best Couple Award	Joo Won (with Kim Tae-hee); Yong-pal	Won	
SBS Drama Awards	2017	Top Excellence Award – Actor in a Monday-Tuesday Drama	My Sassy Girl	Nominated	
SBS Drama Awards	2020	Grand Prize (Daesang)	Alice	Nominated	
SBS Drama Awards	2020	Top Excellence Award, Actor in a Miniseries Fantasy/Romance Drama	Alice	Nominated	
SBS Drama Awards	2020	Producers' Award	Alice	Won	

=== State honors ===
Name of the organization, year presented, and the award given
Organization	Year	Award	Ref.
Financial Services Commission (Note: Honors are given at the Financial Day ceremony.)	2021	Prime Minister's Commendation	

=== Listicles ===
Name of publisher, year listed, name of listicle, and placement
Publisher	Year	Listicle	Placement	Ref.
Forbes	2013	Korea Power Celebrity	18th	
