= Ben (South Korean singer) =

South Korean singer

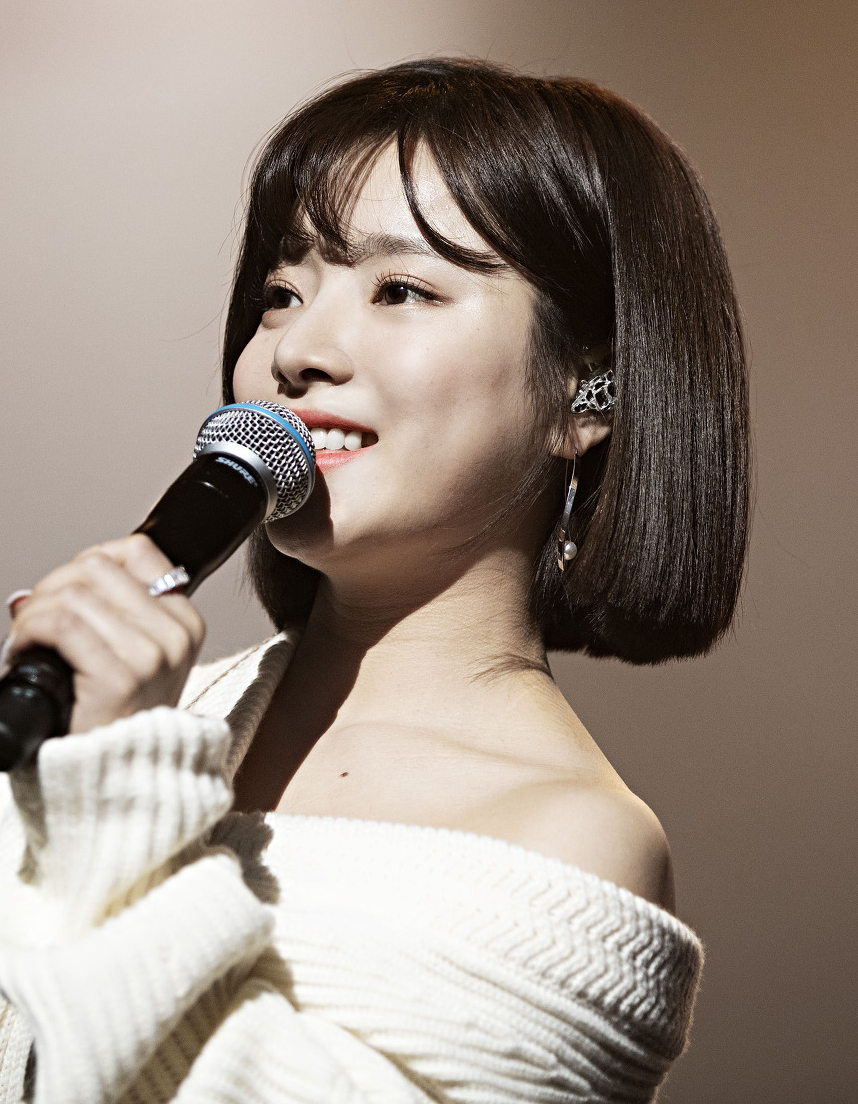
- Ben in January 2019
- Born: Lee Eun-young; July 30, 1991 (age 35); Incheon, South Korea
- Occupation: Singer-songwriter
- Years active: 2010–present
- Spouse: Lee Wook (m. 2021; div. 2024)
- Children: 1
- Musical career
- Genres: R&B; Ballad
- Labels: Y-WHO Enterprise; Happy Face; The Vibe; Major9; BRD Entertainment

Korean name
- Hangul: 이은영
- RR: I Eunyeong
- MR: I Ŭnyŏng

Lee Eun-young (Korean: 이은영; born July 30, 1991), better known by her stage name Ben (벤), is a South Korean singer and songwriter. She made her official debut in October 2012, with their first extended play 147.5. As of 2024 she released one studio album, five extended plays and twenty one singles.

== Career ==
She was a member of South Korean band Bebe Mignon from 2010 to 2011. The band disbanded after the departure of member Gaeul, but she made the transition to vocal soloist thanks to her mentor, Vibe's Yoon Minsu.

In October 2012, she released her first album, 147.5, as a solo vocalist, a compilation of sad ballads with string arrangements and piano, with the title referring to her diminutive height, reported as between 147.5 cm and 153 cm, or around 4 feet 10 inches to 5 feet tall.

In August 2015, she released her second EP My Name Is Ben, with nine tracks, including the title dance song "Looby Loo", which differed from her past ballad style, and other songs including jazz and R&B.

In November 2015, she released another EP, Soulmate, which includes duets with singers MIIII and Sejun Im.

She has recorded many soundtracks, abbreviated as OSTs, for South Korean films and Korean drama or k-drama for television in South Korea. In 2015, these included "Give Me A Hug" for Hello Monster, "Stay" for Oh My Ghost, "You" for Healer, and "Darling You" for Oh My Venus, a duet with Kim Tae-woo. In 2016, she sang "Like a Dream" for Another Miss Oh, recorded a duet with Xia Junsu for his fourth album, Xignature, entitled "Sweet Melody", sang "Misty Road" composed by Jinyoung of B1A4 for Love in the Moonlight and in 2017, she sang "Memory", one of the OSTs for "Introverted Boss".

In 2018, she released her first studio album, Recipe which contains nine tracks overall, she also released her fifth extended play Off The Record which was released in April 2020.

== Personal life ==
Ben was married to businessman Lee Wook. Their wedding took place on June 5, 2021 in a small ceremony with family and friends. On July 18, 2022, Ben announced that she was pregnant with her first child and gave birth to her daughter on February 1, 2023.

On February 29, 2024, Ben announced her divorce from her husband.

== Discography ==
=== Studio albums ===
Title	Album details	Peak chart positions	Sales
Title	Album details	KOR	Sales
Recipe	Released: May 8, 2018; Label: Major9; Format: CD, digital download; Track listing: 1. Love Recipe (skit); 2. Iced Coffee; 3. Love,ing; 4. Bat; 5. Blank; 6. My Name; 7. Am I Right?; 8. Iced Coffee (instrumental); 9. Love,ing (instrumental)	37	KOR: 985+

=== Extended plays ===
Title	EP details	Peak chart positions	Sales
Title	EP details	KOR	Sales
147.5	Released: October 10, 2012; Label: Happy Face Entertainment; Format: CD, digital download	—	—N/a
My Name Is Ben	Released: August 25, 2015; Label: The Vibe Entertainment; Format: CD, digital download	36	—N/a
Soulmate	Released: November 24, 2015; Label: The Vibe Entertainment; Format: CD, digital download	49	—N/a
180˚	Released: December 7, 2018; Label: Major9; Format: CD, digital download	35	KOR: 1,429
Off the Record	Released: April 26, 2020; Label: Major9; Format: CD, digital download	26	—N/a

=== Singles ===
Title	Year	Peak chart positions		Sales	Certifications	Album
Title	Year	KOR Circle	KOR Hot	Sales	Certifications	Album
"Don't Go Today" (오늘은 가지마)	2012	—	—	—N/a	—N/a	147.5
"When You Do Well"	2012	—	—	—N/a	—N/a	147.5
"I Love a Gangster" (언제 사람 될래 (부제: 아가씨와 건달들)	2015	—	*	—N/a	—N/a	Soulmate
"I've Decided to Be Introduced" (소개받기로했어)	2015	42	*	KOR: 111,325	—N/a	My Name Is Ben
"Looby Loo"	2015	—	*	—N/a	—N/a	My Name Is Ben
"Last Time" (마지막이니까) (with Im Se Jun)	2015	—	*	—N/a	—N/a	Soulmate
"Not Ok" (안 괜찮아)	2016	28	*	KOR: 71,051	—N/a	Non-album singles
"Sweety" (달달해) (featuring Yo$sap)	2017	—	*	—N/a	—N/a	Non-album singles
"Love Recipe"	2018	—	—	—N/a	—N/a	Recipe
"Iced Coffee"	2018	—	—	—N/a	—N/a	Recipe
"Love, ing" (열애중)	2018	6	7	KOR: 2,500,000	KMCA: Platinum	Recipe
"180 Degree" (180도)	2018	1	1	KOR: 2,500,000	KMCA: Platinum (Note: Certification for downloads)	180˚
"Thank You for Goodbye" (헤어져줘서 고마워)	2019	1	1	—N/a	—N/a	Non-album single
"Bad" (나쁜 놈)	2020	26	29	—N/a	—N/a	Off the Record
"Lonely Night" (혼술하고 싶은 밤)	2020	18	56	—N/a	—N/a	Lonely Night
"Because I Am a Woman" (여자이니까)	2021	109	—	—N/a	—N/a	Non-album singles
"Come & Talk" (지금 뭐해)	2021	158	75	—N/a	—N/a	Non-album singles
"Spring Days" (벚꽃이 피면 우리 그만 헤어져)	2022	47	53	—N/a	—N/a	Non-album singles
"A Memorial Day" (기념일)	2022	136	*	—N/a	—N/a	"Talks About Memory"
"Waiting.." (늘..)	2022	162	*	—N/a	—N/a	Non-album singles
"I Loved You Like a Movie" (한 편의 영화 같은 널 사랑했어)	2024	200	*	—N/a	—N/a	Non-album singles
"Only You" (바보야)	2024	146	*	—N/a	—N/a	Non-album singles
"—" denotes releases that did not chart or were not released in that region. "*" denotes the chart did not exist at that time.

=== Collaborations ===
Title	Year	Peak chart positions	Sales	Album
Title	Year	KOR	Sales	Album
"Love in Spring" (with Haegeum, Stranger, and Im Se-jun)	2012	—	—N/a	Global Project Pt. 2
"Baby Baby" (with Kim Won-joo of 4Men)	2013	—	—N/a	The Serenade Part. 1
"Lonely Christmas" (나홀로 크리스마스) (with Vibe, 4Men, Im Se-jun, MIIII, and Min Yeon-jae)	2014	47	KOR: 32,590	Lonely Christmas (Made in the Vibe)
"Celebrate Love" (축가) (with Vibe, 4Men, Im Se-jun, and MIIII)	2015	27	KOR: 95,296	Celebrate Love (Made in the Vibe)
"Konus" (Korean ver.) (Feat.bigtone)	2015	—	—N/a	Konus (Made in the VIbe)
"You Are My Christmas" (넌 나의 크리스마스) (with Vibe, 4Men, Im Se-jun, and MIIII)	2015	—	—N/a	You Are My Christmas (Made in the Vibe)
"Don't Go Today" (with Im Se-jun)	2016	—	—N/a	Don't Go Today (Made in the Vibe)
"The Reason Why I'm Beautiful" (내가 예뻐진 이유) (with Eunji and Jihyo)	2016	97	—N/a	Inkigayo Music Crush Pt.1
"Each Other" (서로의 서로) (with Shin Yong-jae of 4Men)	2017	—	—N/a	Each Other (Made in the Vibe)
"The First Night" (첫날밤) (with Kim Won-joo)	2018	—	—N/a	Non-album singles
"Ordinary Love" (보통의 연애) (with CSP)	2020	132	—N/a	Non-album singles
"Can Love Be Fair" (사랑이 공평할 순 없을까) (with G.Soul)	2021	118	—N/a	Non-album singles
"That Man, That Woman" (그 남자 그 여자) (with Shin Yong Jae)	2021	130	—N/a	That Man, That Woman (Revibe Vol.6)

=== Other songs ===
Year	Title	Format	Album	Notes	Ref.
2019
2019	"Hee Jae" (희재)	Digital download, streaming	[Vol.4]You Hee Yul's Sketchbook 10th Anniversary Project: 2nd voice "Sketchbook X Ben",	original song by	
2019	"Purple Breeze" (보라빛 향기)	Digital download, streaming	[Vol.5] You Hee Yul's Sketchbook 10th Anniversary Project: 2nd Voice "Sketchbook X Ben"	original song by	
2013	"To J" (J에게)	Digital download, streaming	Music Voyage Yesterday	original song by Lena Park	

=== Soundtrack appearances ===
Title	Year	Peak chart positions		Sales	Album
Title	Year	KOR		Sales	Album
Title	Year	Gaon	Hot	Sales	Album
"Stop the Love Now"	2014	93	—	KOR: 17,988	Marriage, Not Dating OST
"You"	2015	52	—	KOR: 60,417	Healer OST
"Stay"	2015	—	—		Oh My Ghost OST
"Palpitations"	2015	29	—	KOR: 208,347	The Producers OST
"Hug Me" (안아줘요)	2015	80	—	KOR: 27,746	I Remember You OST
"Darling U" (with Kim Tae Woo)	2015	—	—		Oh My Venus OST
"Sometimes" (때론)	2016	—	—		One More Happy Ending OST
"Like a Dream" (꿈처럼)	2016	6	—	KOR: 993,525	Another Miss Oh OST
"My All"	2016	—	—		Second to Last Love OST
"Misty Road"	2016	10	—	KOR: 313,552	Love in the Moonlight OST
"Memory"	2017	—	—		Introverted Boss OST
"Can't Go" (갈 수가 없어)	2017	—	67		Because This Is My First Life OST
"Love Me Once Again" (미워도 다시 한 번)	2018	73	75		Re:Playlist, Vol.3
"If We Were Destined" (운명이라면)	2018	—	—		A Korean Odyssey OST
"If You Were Me"	2018	88	87		Mr. Sunshine OST
"Can You Hear Me?" (내 목소리 들리니)	2019	3	4		Hotel Del Luna OST
"Deep Sorrow" (한숨만)	2019	158	—		Chief of Staff OST
"Dear My Love" (그대여 그대여 나의 그대여)	2020	—	—		Hyena OST
"I'll Be"	2020	—	—		Mystic Pop-up Bar OST
"Whenever Wherever Whatever"	2020	—	—		Alice OST
"I'm Still Here"	2020	—	81		More Than Friends OST
"With Your Everything"	2021	—	—		Trickster M OST
"Leave Me" (떠나요)	2021	154	94		She Would Never Know OST
"Dialog of Dream" (꿈의 대화)	2021	— (Note: "Dialog of Dream" did not enter the Gaon Digital Chart, but appeared at number 143 on the component Download Chart.)	—		Fly, Again OST
"Starlight Heart" (잠들지 않는 별)	2021	169	—		The Red Sleeve OST
"My Only One" (내게 단 한 사람)	2022	—	—		Tomorrow OST
"Your Traces" (너의 흔적)	2024	—	—		The Midnight Studio OST
"The Way You Look at Me" (언제나 그대라서)	2025	—	—		The First Night with the Duke OST
"—" denotes releases that did not chart or were not released in that region.

== Filmography ==
=== TV series ===
Year	Title	Role	Network	Notes
2015–present	Mother's Spring	herself	TV Chosun	Cast
2015–2016	I Can See Your Voice	herself	Mnet	Regular panelist

== Awards and nominations ==
=== Gaon Chart Music Awards ===
Year	Category	Recipient	Result	Ref.
2018	Discovery of the Year - Ballad	Ben	Won	
2019	Artist of the Year - Digital Music (December)	"180 Degree"	Won	
2020	Artist of the Year - Digital Music (July)	"Thank you for Goodbye"	Won	

=== Genie Music Awards ===
Year	Category	Recipient	Result	Ref.
2018	Song of the Year	"Love, ing"	Nominated	
2018	Song of the Year	"Can't Go"	Nominated	
2018	Vocal Track (Female)	"Love, ing"	Nominated	
2018	OST Award	"Can't Go"	Nominated	
2018	Genie Music Popularity Award	Ben	Nominated	
2019	The Female Solo Artist	Ben	Nominated	
2019	The Vocal Artist	Ben	Nominated	

=== Golden Disc Awards ===
Year	Category	Recipient	Result	Ref.
2022	Digital Song Bonsang	"Lonely Night"	Nominated	
2022	Seezn Most Popular Artist Award	Ben	Nominated	

=== Korea Popular Music Award ===
Year	Category	Recipient	Result
2018	Best OST	"Can't Go"	Won

=== Melon Music Awards ===
Year	Category	Recipient	Result
2019	Top 10 Artists	Ben	Nominated
2019	Song of the Year	"180 Degree"	Nominated
2019	Best Ballad	"180 Degree"	Nominated
2019	Album of the Year	"180 Degree"	Nominated

=== Mnet Asian Music Awards ===
Year	Category	Recipient	Result
2019	Best Vocal Performance – Solo	"180 Degree"	Nominated
2019	Song of the Year	"180 Degree"	Nominated
2019	Worldwide Fans’ Choice Top 10	Ben	Nominated
