= Yong-pal =

2015 South Korean drama series

- Promotional poster
- Also known as: The Gang Doctor
- Hangul: 용팔이
- RR: Yongpari
- MR: Yongp'ari
- Genre: Action; Medical; Romance
- Written by: Jang Hyuk-rin
- Directed by: Oh Jin-suk
- Starring: Joo Won; Kim Tae-hee; Jo Hyun-jae; Chae Jung-an
- Composer: Park Gi-heon
- Country of origin: South Korea
- Original language: Korean
- No. of episodes: 18

Production
- Executive producer: Moon Bo-mi
- Producers: Park Young-soo; Kim Si-hwan
- Cinematography: Yoon Dae-young; Choi Je-rak
- Editors: Lee Hyun-ah; Jung Il-won
- Running time: 65 minutes
- Production company: HB Entertainment

Original release
- Network: Seoul Broadcasting System
- Release: August 5 – October 1, 2015

Yong-pal (Korean: 용팔이) is a 2015 South Korean drama series starring Joo Won, Kim Tae-hee, Chae Jung-an and Jo Hyun-jae. It aired on SBS from August 5 to October 1, 2015, on Wednesdays and Thursdays at 21:55 for 18 episodes. Originally slated for 16 episodes, due to the high ratings and popularity of the drama, it was extended by two episodes.

This drama reunites Kim Tae-hee and Jo Hyun-jae who first worked together in the 2004 drama Forbidden Love.

== Synopsis ==
Kim Tae Hyun is a talented surgeon. Desperate for money to pay for his sister's medical bills, he adopts the code name Yong-pal and offers his medical skills to those in need of medical attention but who cannot do so publicly, dealing with criminals and corrupt plutocrats. Joining a team of corrupt physicians Kim rescues "sleeping beauty" Han Yeo Jin, a chaebol heiress, from a medically induced coma, leading to unintended consequences.

== Cast ==
=== Main ===
- Joo Won as Kim Tae-hyun
  - Jung Yoon-seok as young Tae-hyun

A skilled surgeon, who under the alias Yong-pal moonlights as a mercenary doctor for hire. He falls in love with Yeo-jin.

- Kim Tae-hee as Han Yeo-jin

A chaebol heiress placed in a coma by her enemies to get their revenge. She falls in love with Tae-hyun.

- Jo Hyun-jae as Han Do-joon

Han Yeo-jin's half-brother, who covets his sister's inheritance.

- Chae Jung-an as Lee Chae-young

Han Do-joon's wife.

=== Supporting ===
- Jung Woong-in as Chief Lee Ho-joon
- Stephanie Lee as Cynthia Park
- Song Kyung-chul as Doo-chul
- Min Jin-Woong as Lee Sang-Chul
- Ahn Se-ha as Man-sik
- Bae Hae-sun as Nurse Hwang
- Im Kang-sung as Cha Sae-hoon
- Jo Bok-rae as Park Tae-yong
- Cha Soon-bae as Chief Shin
- Kim Mi-kyung as Kang Soo-min, Charge nurse, surgery
- Oh Na-ra as Charge nurse, intensive care
- Park Pal-young as Hospital director
- Park Hye-su as Kim So-hyun
- Choi Joon-Yong as Tae-hyun's father
- Kim Na-woon as Tae-hyun's mother
- Nam Myeong-ryeol as Chae-young's father
- Jang Gwang as Chairman Go
- Yoo Seung-mok as Detective Lee Hyung-sa
- Jo Hwi as Detective Kim
- Choi Min as Choi Sung-hoon (guest)

=== Special appearances ===
- Lim Hwa-young as Han Song-yi
- Kim Jae-young as Yong Pal 2 (ep.18)

== Original soundtrack ==
Yong-pal OST

Soundtrack album by Various artists
- Recorded: 2015
- Genre: Soundtrack
- Languages: Korean; English
- Labels: Neowiz Entertainment; Daum and HB Entertainment

=== Part 1 ===
Released on August 12, 2015
No.	Title	Artist	Length
1.	"To My Love" (사랑하는그대에게)	The One (singer)	3:41
2.	"To My Love" (Inst.)		3:41
Total length:			7:22

=== Part 2 ===
Released on August 19, 2015
No.	Title	Artist	Length
1.	"A Nightmare" (악몽)	Yong Jun-hyung (Highlight) and Heo Ga-yoon (4minute)	3:51
2.	"A Nightmare" (Inst.)		3:51
Total length:			7:02

=== Part 3 ===
Released on September 2, 2015
No.	Title	Artist	Length
1.	"Actually, I'm..." (사실은내가)	Jung In	4:16
2.	"Actually, I'm..." (Inst.)		4:16
Total length:			8:22

=== Part 4 ===
Released on September 9, 2015
No.	Title	Artist	Length
1.	"So we are" (이렇게우리)	Baek A-yeon	3:57
2.	"So we are" (Inst.)		3:57
Total length:			4:14

=== Part 5 ===
Released on September 16, 2015
No.	Title	Artist	Length
1.	"Come to me" (내게 와줘서)	K.Will	3:57
2.	"Come to me" (Inst.)		3:57
Total length:			4:14

=== Part 6 ===
Released on September 24, 2015
No.	Title	Artist	Length
1.	"Only remember me" (나하나만)	Park Hye-soo	3:57
2.	"Only remember me" (Inst.)		3:57
Total length:			4:14

=== Part 7 ===
Released on September 30, 2015
No.	Title	Artist	Length
1.	"I Hear you" (니가들려)	Ahn Se-ha	3:23
2.	"I Hear you" (Inst.)		3:23
Total length:			6:46

=== Part 8 ===
Released on September 30, 2015
No.	Title	Artist	Length
1.	"Suddenly one day" (어느날갑감자기)	Jin Min-ho	3:48
2.	"Suddenly one day" (Inst.)		3:48
Total length:			7:22

Disc 2:
No.	Title	Artist	Length
1.	"Main theme of Yong-pal" (Opening Title)	Various Artists	3:32
2.	"Black Room"	Various Artists	2:36
3.	"Hero"	Various Artists	2:09
4.	"Its not that"	Various Artists	2:11
5.	"I never get caught"	Various Artists	2:35
6.	"Let's be friend"	Various Artists	2:48
7.	"Light of Hope"	Various Artists	3:07
8.	"My Mother"	Various Artists	2:59
9.	"Persuit"	Various Artists	3:07
10.	"Precious Family"	Various Artists	3:27
11.	"Run and Run"	Various Artists	3:30
12.	"Sleeping Witch"	Various Artists	2:45
13.	"The Battle"	Various Artists	2:22
14.	"Tae-Hyun's Family"	Various Artists	2:55
15.	"Wound of a question"	Various Artists	2:18
16.	"Yeo Jin's Destiny"	Various Artists	2:44
17.	"Yeo Jin's Theme"	Various Artists	2:47
18.	"Yong-pal"	Various Artists	3:12

== Viewership ==
Since it began airing, Yong-pal recorded steadily increasing viewership ratings, eventually hitting an impressive 20 percent by its sixth episode. It consistently topped other shows in its Wednesday-Thursday timeslot, eventually becoming one of the top-rated Korean drama primetime miniseries of 2015.

Ep.	Original broadcast date	Average audience share			
Ep.	Original broadcast date	Nielsen Korea		TNmS	
Ep.	Original broadcast date	Nationwide	Seoul	Nationwide	Seoul
1	August 5, 2015	11.6% (4th)	12.9% (3rd)	9.2% (9th)	11.2% (5th)
2	August 6, 2015	14.1% (3rd)	16.0% (3rd)	11.8% (5th)	14.9% (3rd)
3	August 12, 2015	14.5% (3rd)	16.3% (3rd)	12.5% (5th)	15.8% (3rd)
4	August 13, 2015	16.3% (3rd)	17.8% (2nd)	15.3% (3rd)	18.8% (2nd)
5	August 19, 2015	18.0% (2nd)	20.3% (2nd)	16.4% (3rd)	19.4% (2nd)
6	August 20, 2015	20.4% (2nd)	22.2% (2nd)	18.1% (3rd)	20.7% (2nd)
7	August 26, 2015	19.2% (2nd)	21.4% (1st)	17.1% (3rd)	21.2% (2nd)
8	August 27, 2015	20.5% (2nd)	22.8% (2nd)	18.4% (2nd)	21.9% (1st)
9	September 2, 2015	17.0% (3rd)	19.1% (2nd)	15.7% (4th)	18.2% (2nd)
10	September 3, 2015	17.4% (2nd)	19.3% (2nd)	16.3% (2nd)	19.3% (2nd)
11	September 9, 2015	19.3% (2nd)	21.7% (2nd)	15.9% (3rd)	18.4% (2nd)
12	September 10, 2015	19.1% (2nd)	21.0% (2nd)	18.2% (2nd)	21.3% (2nd)
13	September 16, 2015	21.5% (2nd)	23.7% (1st)	18.0% (2nd)	21.0% (2nd)
14	September 17, 2015	20.9% (2nd)	22.3% (2nd)	19.5% (2nd)	21.8% (2nd)
15	September 23, 2015	20.0% (2nd)	22.3% (2nd)	17.8% (2nd)	20.0% (2nd)
16	September 24, 2015	20.2% (2nd)	22.3% (2nd)	19.2% (2nd)	21.0% (1st)
17	September 30, 2015	18.4% (3rd)	20.0% (2nd)	16.4% (3rd)	18.2% (2nd)
18	October 1, 2015	20.4% (2nd)	21.6% (2nd)	19.6% (2nd)	21.4% (2nd)
Average		18.3%	20.2%	16.4%	19.1%
In the table above, the blue numbers represent the lowest ratings and the red numbers represent the highest ratings.

== Awards and nominations ==
Year	Award	Category	Recipient	Result
2015	8th Korea Drama Awards	Grand Prize (Daesang)	Joo Won	Nominated
2015	8th Korea Drama Awards	Best Drama	Yong-pal	Nominated
2015	8th Korea Drama Awards	Top Excellence Award, actress	Kim Tae-hee	Won
2015	8th Korea Drama Awards	Best Screenplay	Jang Hyuk-rin	Won
2015	4th APAN Star Awards	Top Excellence Award, Actor in a Miniseries	Joo Won	Nominated
2015	4th APAN Star Awards	Top Excellence Award, Actress in a Miniseries	Kim Tae-hee	Nominated
2015	4th APAN Star Awards	Best Supporting Actress	Chae Jung-an	Won
2015	2015 Hallyu Awards	Best Drama	Yong-pal	Won
2015	Grimae Awards	Grand Prize	Yoon Dae-young, Choi Je-rak	Won
2015	Grimae Awards	Best Director	Oh Jin-seok	Won
2015	23rd SBS Drama Awards	Grand Prize (Daesang)	Joo Won	Won
2015	23rd SBS Drama Awards	Top Excellence Award, Actor in a Miniseries	Joo Won	Nominated
2015	23rd SBS Drama Awards	Top Excellence Award, Actress in a Miniseries	Kim Tae-hee	Won
2015	23rd SBS Drama Awards	Special Award, Actor in a Miniseries	Jung Woong-in	Nominated
2015	23rd SBS Drama Awards	Special Award, Actor in a Miniseries	Jo Hyun-jae	Nominated
2015	23rd SBS Drama Awards	Special Award, Actress in a Miniseries	Bae Hae-sun	Nominated
2015	23rd SBS Drama Awards	PD Award	Joo Won	Nominated
2015	23rd SBS Drama Awards	Top 10 Stars	Joo Won	Won
2015	23rd SBS Drama Awards	Top 10 Stars	Kim Tae-hee	Won
2015	23rd SBS Drama Awards	Chinese Netizen Popularity Award	Joo Won	Won
2015	23rd SBS Drama Awards	Chinese Netizen Popularity Award	Kim Tae-hee	Nominated
2015	23rd SBS Drama Awards	Netizen Popularity Award	Joo Won	Nominated
2015	23rd SBS Drama Awards	Netizen Popularity Award	Kim Tae-hee	Nominated
2015	23rd SBS Drama Awards	Best Couple Award	Joo Won and Kim Tae-hee	Won
2016	52nd Baeksang Arts Awards	Best Actor (TV)	Joo Won	Nominated

== Remake ==
There was a talk that the drama Yong-pal which starred Joo Won and Kim Tae-hee could be remade for American audiences. It was reported in December 2015 that a Russian remake produced by Sony Pictures Studios was in development.
