= Oh! My Ghost =

2022 South Korean comedy horror film

- Promotional poster
- Hangul: 오! 마이 고스트
- RR: O! mai goseuteu
- MR: O! mai kosŭt'ŭ
- Directed by: Hong Tae-sun
- Written by: Yoo Se-moon
- Produced by: Korea University of Media and Film
- Starring: Jeong Jin-woon; Ahn Seo-hyun; Lee Joo-yeon; Jeon Soo-jin
- Production companies: Film A Pictures Co., Ltd
- Distributed by: D-Station Co., Ltd
- Release date: September 15, 2022
- Country: South Korea
- Language: Korean

Oh! My Ghost (Korean: 오! 마이 고스트) is a 2022 South Korean comedy horror film, directed by Hong Tae-sun and starring Jeong Jin-woon, Ahn Seo-hyun, Lee Joo-yeon and Jeon Soo-jin. The film written by Yoo Se-moon tells the story of 'Taemin', a ten-year-old trainee who sees ghosts. He gets a job at a shooting studio where every night a mysterious incident occurs. It was anticipated to be released in theatres in the second half of 2021, but was postponed and finally released on September 15, 2022.

== Cast ==
- Jeong Jin-woon as Taemin
- Ahn Seo-hyun as Kongi
- Lee Joo-yeon as Se-ah, a new representative of a shooting studio
- Jeon Soo-jin as Seung Hee
- Jung Tae-woo as Myeong-seok, a home shopping video director
- Kang Sung-pil

== Production ==
Oh! My Ghost is a first commercial film, co-produced by Korea University of Media and Film and Film A Pictures Co., Ltd. Principal photography began on February 5, 2021, and was wrapped up at the end of March.

== Release ==
The film was pre-sold in 13 countries overseas even before its release in South Korea. It was released theatrically in South Korea on September 15, 2022.
