= Single-minded Dandelion =

2014 South Korean television soap opera

- Promotional Poster
- Also known as: Abiding Love Dandelion; One Way Dandelion; Single-minded Min Deul-re
- Genre: Period drama; Romance; Family
- Written by: Lee Hae-jung; Yeom Il-ho
- Directed by: Shin Chang-seok
- Starring: Kim Ga-eun; Hong In-young; Yoon Sun-woo; Jeon Seung-bin
- Country of origin: South Korea
- Original language: Korean
- No. of episodes: 134

Production
- Executive producer: Kim Sung-geun
- Producer: Choi Yoon-seok
- Running time: 40 min
- Production company: KBS Drama Production

Original release
- Network: KBS2
- Release: August 25, 2014 – February 27, 2015

Single-minded Dandelion (Korean: TV소설 일편단심 민들레; RR: TVsoseol ilpyeondansim mindeulle) is a 2014 South Korean morning soap opera starring Kim Ga-eun, Hong In-young, Yoon Sun-woo and Jeon Seung-bin. It aired on KBS2 from August 25, 2014 to February 27, 2015 on Mondays to Fridays at 09:00 for 134 episodes.

== Plot ==
During the 1960s and 1970s, two sisters work at a flour mill and experience life and love.

== Cast ==
- Kim Ga-eun as Min Deul-re
  - Ahn Seo-hyun as young Deul-re
- Hong In-young as Shin Se-young/Jin Se-young
  - Lee Young-eun as young Se-young
- Yoon Sun-woo as Shin Tae-oh
  - Yoo Seung-yong as young Tae-oh
- Jeon Seung-bin as Cha Yong-soo/Sam Cha
- Kim Ha-kyun as Park Soon-hee
- Joo Min-ha as Park Choon-ok
  - Jung Ji-in as young Choon-ok
- Choi Cheol-ho as Min Kang-wook
- Shin Eun-jung as Choi Joo-hee
- Lee Jin-woo as Jin Sun-jae
- Noh Young-hak as Kang Dong-soo/Jin Do-young
- Kim Jin-seo as Heo Bong-jae
- Choi Jae-sung as Shin Dae-sung
- Choi Ji-na as Yoon Jung-im
- Kim Jin-yi as Choi Jung-won
- Lee Eun-hyung as Seo Joon-ho
  - Tang Jun-sang as young Joon-ho
- Kim Ye-ryeong as Hwang Geum-shil
- Yeon Je-wook as Song Soo-chul
  - Kim Tae-yong as young Soo-chul
- Lee Ah-yi as Song Soo-ja
  - Jung Chan-bi as young Soo-ja
- Choi Wan-jung as Joo Kyung-ae
- Do Min-hyuk
- Jo Hyun-do as Ddaem Tong
- Lee Chae-yoon
- Jang Dae-woong as Ko Jjil-jjil
- Choi Su-rin as Madam Jang
- Park Jae-woong as Do Bong-san
- Jang Tae-sung as Jang Young-man
- Lee Myung-ho as Lee Gyo-seok

== Awards and nominations ==
Year	Award	Category	Recipient	Result
2014	KBS Drama Awards	Excellence Award, Actor in a Daily Drama	Choi Jae-sung	Won
2014	KBS Drama Awards	Excellence Award, Actress in a Daily Drama	Kim Ga-eun	Nominated
2014	KBS Drama Awards	Best New Actress	Kim Ga-eun	Nominated
2014	KBS Drama Awards	Best Young Actress	Ahn Seo-hyun	Won
