= Lee Joo-yeon =

South Korean singer and actress (born 1987)

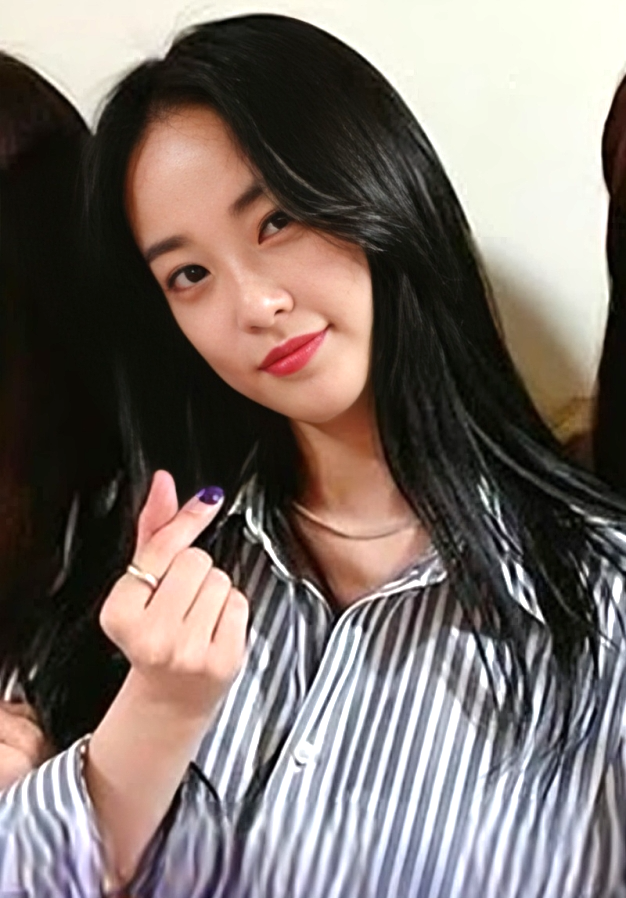
- Lee in June 2021
- Born: Lee Joo-yeon; March 19, 1987 (age 39); Nowon District, Seoul, South Korea
- Education: Dongduk Women's University
- Occupations: Actress; singer; model
- Years active: 2007–present
- Agent: Billions
- Musical career
- Genres: K-pop
- Instrument: Vocals
- Label: Pledis
- Formerly of: After School; A.S. Blue

Korean name
- Hangul: 이주연
- Hanja: 李周姸
- RR: I Juyeon
- MR: I Chuyŏn

Lee Joo-yeon (born March 19, 1987), formerly known mononymously as Jooyeon, is a South Korean actress and singer. She is best known for being a former member of the girl group After School. Since leaving After School, she has focused primarily on acting. She made her acting debut in the drama Smile Again (2010) and has participated in other dramas since then.

== Career ==
=== 2007–2014: Pre-debut and career beginnings ===
In 2007, Jooyeon made a cameo in the movie My Tutor Friend 2, playing the role of Azumi. Before her debut, Jooyeon was famous on the internet for being an Ulzzang, or "best face" which consisted of her being well known for her natural beauty features. She made her first unofficial appearance with After School's on December 29, 2008, at the SBS Song Festival, performing "Play Girlz" with Son Dam-bi.

On January 15, 2009, Jooyeon made her debut in South Korean girl group After School, with the release of their debut single "AH!" alongside their EP, New Schoolgirl. On 17 January, the group made their live debut on MBC's, Music Core.

In 2010, Jooyeon made her acting debut in the drama Smile Again and was a member of G7 in the variety show Invincible Youth. Over the years, she starred as supporting roles in various dramas and movies.

In 2011, she became the leader of A.S. Blue. The sub-unit debuted with the single "Wonder Boy" on July 20.

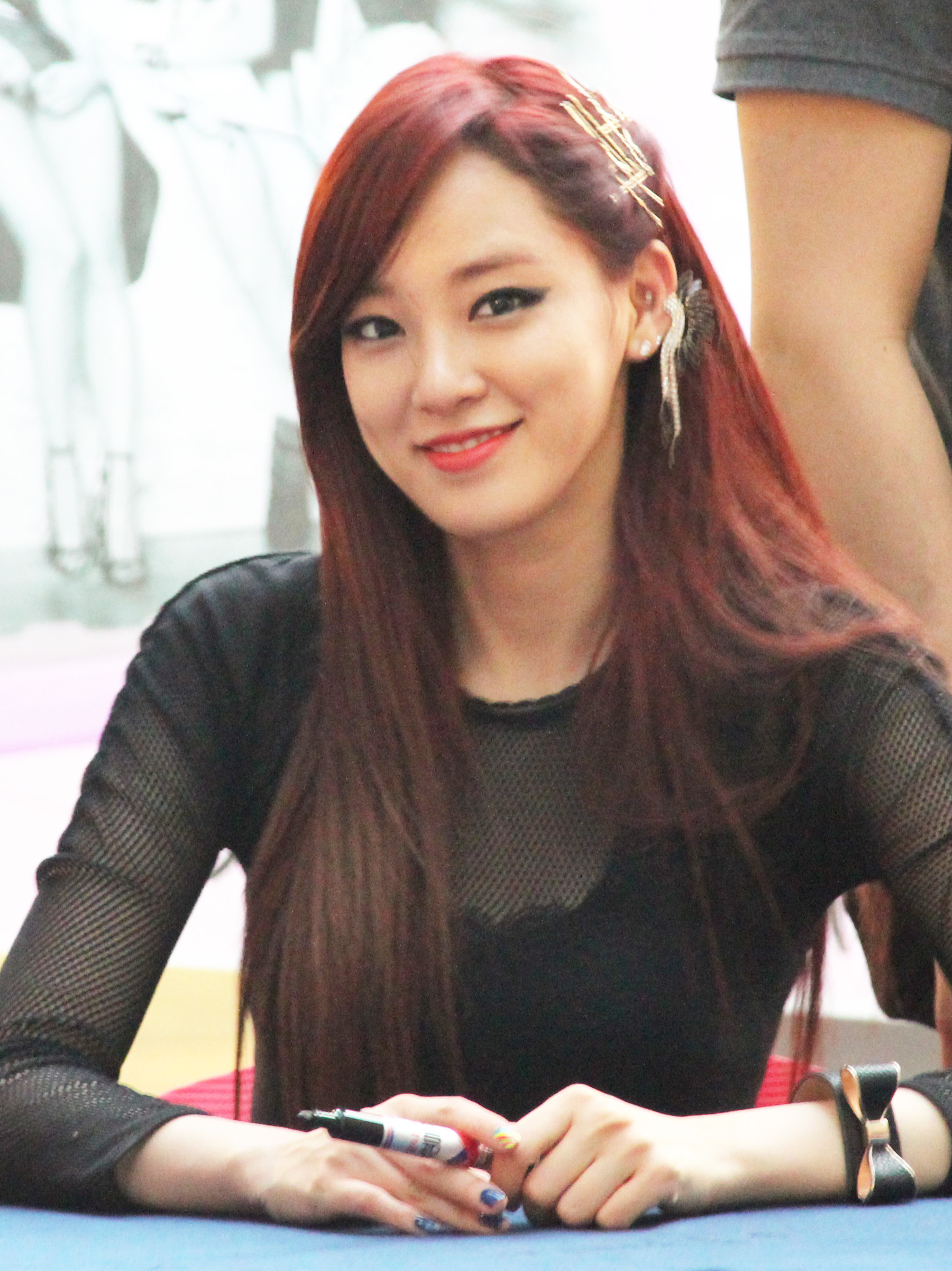
Lee at a fansigning event in 2013

On December 31, 2014, Jooyeon's contract with Pledis Entertainment expired and she graduated from After School on June 30, 2015, after Japan promotions. Jooyeon was the only member, along with Jungah, who was in the group for all promotional periods.

=== 2015—present: Acting career and further roles ===
In January 2015, following her graduation and departure from After School, Jooyeon signed with Better ENT to pursue her acting career. She made her first appearance under her new company in the film Sorry, I Love You, Thank You, playing the role of Jung Hye-mi. She has since gone on to star in a number of dramas, such as All Kinds of Daughters-In-Law.

In 2017, Lee took on acting roles in crime flick The King and historical drama Saimdang, Memoir of Colors. In 2018, Jooyeon's contract with Better ENT expired and she began looking for a new agency. She subsequently signed with Mystic Story. Later that year, Jooyeon took on supporting roles in The Undateables and Devilish Charm.

On May 27, 2021, Lee signed with C-JeS Entertainment.

== Personal life ==
On February 22, 2011, Jooyeon graduated from Dongduk Women's University with a major in broadcasting.

On November 21, 2011, Jooyeon was admitted to the hospital with acute nephritis. On November 29, she was discharged and had resumed all group activities.

== Filmography ==
=== Film ===
Year	Title	Role
2007	My Tutor Friend 2	Azumi
2015	Sorry, I Love You, Thank You	Jung Hye-mi
2017	The King	Cha Mi-ryeon
2022	Oh! My Ghost	Se-ah

=== Television series ===
Year	Title	Role
2009	You're Beautiful	Before School member (cameo)
2010–2011	Smile Again	Yoon Sae-young
2012	Salamander Guru and The Shadows	Shi-ra
2012	Reply 1997	Dr. Lee Joo-yeon
2012	Jeon Woo-Chi	Eun-woo
2013	Monstar	Ah-ri
2013	Reply 1994	Dr. Lee Joo-yeon
2014	A New Leaf	Lee Mi-ri
2014	Hotel King	Chae-won
2016	Immortal Goddess	Soo-jung
2016	The Facetale: Shinderiya	Shin De-ri
2016	Fantastic	Actress
2016	Entourage	Lee Joo-yeon
2017	Saimdang, Memoir of Colors	Princess Jeongsun
2017	Sisters-in-Law	Hwang Geum-byul
2018	The Undateables	Su-ji
2018	Devilish Charm	Lee Ha-yim
2020	Hyena	Seo Jung-hwa

=== Web series ===
Year	Title	Role	Ref.
2022	Kiss Sixth Sense	Oh Ji-young	

=== Variety shows ===
Year	Title	Role	Notes
2010	Invincible Youth	Regular cast	
2012	Music and Lyrics	Regular cast	with Lee Tae-sung
2018	Law of the Jungle in Northern Mariana Islands	Cast member	
