= The Divine Move =

- Theatrical release poster
- Hangul: 신의 한 수
- RR: Sinui han su
- MR: Sinŭi han su
- Directed by: Jo Bum-gu
- Written by: Yu Seong-hyeop
- Produced by: Park Mae-hee; Yu Jeong-hun; Hwang Geun-ha
- Starring: Jung Woo-sung; Lee Beom-soo; Ahn Sung-ki; Kim In-kwon; Lee Si-young; Ahn Gil-kang; Choi Jin-hyuk
- Cinematography: Kim Dong-young
- Edited by: Shin Min-kyung
- Music by: Chang Hyuk-jin
- Production companies: Showbox; MAYS Entertainment; Azit Film
- Distributed by: Showbox
- Release date: July 3, 2014
- Running time: 117 minutes
- Country: South Korea
- Language: Korean
- Box office: US$27.9 million

The Divine Move (Korean: 신의 한 수) is a 2014 South Korean action thriller film directed by Jo Bum-gu. The film stars Jung Woo-sung as a former baduk player and revolves around his quest for revenge. The title refers to a particularly brilliant move, considered to be a "once in a lifetime" experience for only the best professionals, in the board game baduk (called Go in the West) which often turns what was a losing or close game into a winning effort at the most crucial moment.

A prequel spin-off, The Divine Move 2: The Wrathful, was released on November 7, 2019.

== Synopsis ==
Professional baduk player Tae-seok loses a high-stakes game to infamous underground gambler Sal-soo, and ends up framed for the murder of his own brother and locked up in prison. He vows revenge and trains ferociously. After serving his seven-year sentence, he gets in touch with his brother's former associate "Tricks," hermit and blind master player "The Lord," and skillful junkyard owner Mok-su, "the Carpenter".

Together, they begin formulating a plan to get back at Sal-soo and his men. Tae-seok slowly penetrates Sal-soo's inner circle and his gambling joint, and eliminates Sal-soo's men one by one. But Sal-soo discovers Tae-seok's true identity and engages him in one final game that will seal the fates of the two men involved.

== Cast ==
- Jung Woo-sung as Tae-seok
- Lee Beom-soo as Sal-soo
- Ahn Sung-ki as Joo-nim ("The Lord")
- Kim In-kwon as Kkong-soo ("Tricks")
- Lee Si-young as Bae-kkob ("Belly button")
- Ahn Gil-kang as Carpenter Heo
- Lee Do-kyeong as Master Wang
- Choi Jin-hyuk as Seon-soo ("Player")
- Jung Hae-kyun as Adari
- Ahn Seo-hyun as Ryang-ryang
- Kim Myung-soo as Tae-seok's older brother
- Hwang Choon-ha as Hunchbacked minion
- Lee Il-seop as Master Noh
- Kim Se-dong as Master Lee
- Kim Joo-myeong as Chinese top
- Lee Yong-nyeo as "Open tail"
- Yoo Soon-cheol as 70-year-old boss
- Hong Seong-deok as Professional cutter
- Park Ji-hoon as Acting general
- Yoon Hee-cheol as Elderly senior
- Kim So-jin as Young-sook
- Yoo Jae-sang as Tae-seok's nephew
- Choi Il-hwa as Mob leader
- Kim Hong-pa as Warden
- Kwon Tae-won as Soft touch president
- Bae Seong-woo as Mahjong man

== Box office ==
Since opening in South Korea on July 3, 2014, the film has grossed ₩28.3 billion (US$27.6 million) on 3.5 million admissions.

== International release ==
The Divine Move received a limited theatrical release in the United States on July 25, 2014. It was screened in seven major cities in Germany from August 27 to September 21, 2014, as part of the local Fantasy Filmfest's lineup.

== Awards and nominations ==
Year	Award	Category	Recipient	Result
2014	51st Grand Bell Awards	Best Actor	Jung Woo-sung	Nominated
2014	51st Grand Bell Awards	Best Supporting Actor	Kim In-kwon	Nominated
2014	51st Grand Bell Awards	Best New Actor	Choi Jin-hyuk	Nominated
2014	51st Grand Bell Awards	Best Editing	Shin Min-kyung	Won
2014	35th Blue Dragon Film Awards	Best Actor	Jung Woo-sung	Nominated
2014	35th Blue Dragon Film Awards	Best New Actor	Choi Jin-hyuk	Nominated
2014	35th Blue Dragon Film Awards	Best Editing	Shin Min-kyung	Nominated
2014	35th Blue Dragon Film Awards	Technical Award	Choi Bong-rok (martial arts)	Nominated
