= Melting Me Softly =

2019 South Korean television series

- Promotional poster
- Hangul: 날 녹여주오
- Lit.: Melt Me
- RR: Nal nogyeojuo
- MR: Nal nogyŏjuo
- Genre: Fantasy; Romantic comedy
- Created by: Studio Dragon
- Written by: Baek Mi-kyung
- Directed by: Shin Woo-chul
- Starring: Ji Chang-wook; Won Jin-ah; Yoon Se-ah
- Music by: Kim Joon-seok; Jeong Se-rin
- Country of origin: South Korea
- Original language: Korean
- No. of episodes: 16

Production
- Producers: Baek Mi-kyung; Choi Yeon-ju
- Camera setup: Single camera
- Running time: 60 mins
- Production company: Story Phoenix

Original release
- Network: TVN
- Release: September 28 – November 17, 2019

Melting Me Softly (Korean: 날 녹여주오) is a 2019 South Korean television series starring Ji Chang-wook, Won Jin-ah, and Yoon Se-ah. Created by Studio Dragon and produced by writer Baek Mi-kyung's own company Story Phoenix, it aired on tvN every Saturday and Sunday at 21:00 (KST) from September 28 to November 17, 2019 for 16 episodes.

== Synopsis ==
Ma Dong-chan (Ji Chang-wook) and Go Mi-ran (Won Jin-ah) take part in a 24-hour experiment where both are frozen. Things do not go as expected and they wake up from the frozen capsule 20 years later instead of 24 hours. Wanting to survive the side effects of their cryogenic sleep, they must follow a set of restrictions to maintain their body temperature at 31.5 °C (max. 33 °C/88-91 °F) and keep their heart rate normal. The scientist behind the experiment is the only one who knows the key to their survival, but he has lost his memory after an accident. Racing against time, the story focuses on the two dynamic individuals' attempt to resume normalcy and catch up on the lost time of their lives.

== Cast ==
=== Main ===
- Ji Chang-wook as Ma Dong-chan (32/52), a star PD at TBO broadcast station.
- Won Jin-ah as Go Mi-ran (24/44), a college student and variety show part-timer later intern in Entertainment Department at TBO broadcast station.
- Yoon Se-ah as Na Ha-young (44), a news director and Dong-chan's ex-girlfriend/fiancé.
  - Chae Seo-jin as young Ha-young (24), a news announcer and Dong-chan's girlfriend/fiancé.

=== Supporting ===
==== People around Dong-chan ====
- Yoon Seok-hwa as Kim Won-jo, Dong-chan's mother (55/75)
- Kim Won-hae as Ma Pil-gu, Dong-chan's father (59)
- Kang Ki-doong as Ma Dong-sik (29), Dong-chan's younger brother who is pianist.
  - Kim Won-hae as old Dong-sik (49)
- Han Da-sol as Ma Dong-joo (30), Dong-chan's younger sister.
  - Jeon Soo-kyeong as old Dong-joo (50)
- Lee Do-gyeom as Baek Young-tak (35), Dong-joo's husband, who is a police detective.
  - Lee Do-yeop as old Young-tak (55), Dong-joo's ex-husband.
- Lee Joo-young as Lee Hye-jin, Dong-sik's wife
- Oh Ah-rin as Ma Seo-yoon (7), Dong-sik's daughter.

==== People around Mi-ran ====
- Gil Hae-yeon as Mi-ran's mother (46/66)
- Park Choong-sun as Mi-ran's father (45/65)
- Park Min-soo as Go Nam-tae (12), Mi-ran's brother
  - Yoon Na-moo as adult Nam-tae (32)

==== People at the broadcast station ====
- Im Won-hee as Son Hyeon-gi (48), an Entertainment Department director.
  - Lee Hong-gi as young Son Hyeon-gi (28), Dong-chan's assistant director and junior colleague in the entertainment department.
- Jung Hae-kyun as Kim Hong-seok (41/61), an Entertainment Department director, later President.
- Han Jae-Yi as PD Su.
- Hong Seo-baek as PD Lee.

==== People at the campus ====
- Cha Sun-woo as Hwang Byung-shim (24), a university student and Mi-ran's ex-boyfriend.
  - Shim Hyung-tak as old Byung-shim (44), a Psychology professor who is Young-seon's ex-husband and Ji-hoon's father.
- Song Ji-eun as Oh Young-seon (24), Mi-ran's best friend, who married Byung-shim.
  - Seo Jeong-yeon as old Young-seon (44)
- Oh Ha-nee as Park Kyung-ja (24), Mi-ran's other best friend.
  - Park Hee-jin as old Kyung-ja (44)
- Choi Bo-min as Hwang Ji-hoon (19), Hwang Byung-shim and Young-sun's son, a freshman at University who develops a crush on Mi-ran.
- Kang You-seok as Park Young-joon (19), Ji-hoon's best friend, a freshman at University.

==== Others ====
- Seo Hyun-chul as Hwang Gab-soo (46/66), the professor in charge of the frozen human experiments. He was seriously hurt in a car accident that caused him to be comatosed, rendering him unable to help Dong-chan and Mi-ran to regain consciousness for the next twenty years.
- Lee Moo-saeng as Jo Ki-beom (45), Professor Hwang's assistant
  - Kim Wook as young Ki-beom (25),
- Kim Bup-rae as Lee Hyung-do/Lee Seok-do, who were both twin brothers. Seok-do was one of the test subjects of Professor Hwang's experiment, and Hyung-do, who was Seok-do's younger twin brother, wanted to murder his brother and Professor Hwang to take his brother's place as the next-in-line CEO of their father's company.
- Byung-hun as Kim Jin, Dong-chan and Hyun-ki's junior, a cameraman at a broadcasting station.
  - Choi Dae-seong as older Kim Jin, a photographer.
- Lee Bong-ryun as Park Yoo-ja, Gyeong-ja's older sister, a fortune teller.
- Han Ki-woong as Lee Jung-woo, Seok-du and Hyo-woo's son, an American exchange student, and Hyeong-du's nephew.
- Yoon Joo-man as Terry Kim/Kim Hyun Do, a killer
- Robin Deiana as Nikolai, a former member of the Russian mafia.
- Choi Na-mu as Park Han-byeol, a female police officer at the police station
- Yang Hyun-min as the kidnapper who kidnapped Dong-chan and Miran
- Yeom Dong-heon as Seo Yoon-seok, Professor, who is Ma Dong-chan's classmate
- Ra Mi-ran as Kang Ok-bong, Doctor of Philosophy
- Kim Su-ro as Yoo Ji-min, a humanist, writer.
- Jinyoung as Cha Woojin.
- Jeong Myeong-jun as Yoo Woo-jeon, a Doctor of Biotechnology
- Kim Jong-goo as Kim Ji-seok, member of the National Assembly, former President of TBO.
- Choi Ri as a woman who Byung-shim cheated on Mi-Ran.
- Seo Sang-won as Dr. Yoon.
- Choi So-hyun as Nurse.
- Shin Bo-kyung as Kim Ah-reum
- Nam Min-woo as Kim Ji-oh.

==== Special appearances ====
- Tony An as himself (Ep. 1)
- Kim Soo-ro (Ep. 6)
- Ra Mi-ran (Ep. 6)
- Park Jin-young as Jang Woo-shin (Ep. 14)

== Production ==
Won Jin-ah and Yoon Se-ah have previously starred together in the 2017 drama Rain or Shine. The first script-reading took place in June 2019.

== Original soundtrack ==
Melting Me Softly OST

Soundtrack album by Various artists
- Recorded: 2019
- Genre: Soundtrack
- Languages: Korean; English
- Labels: Genie Music; Stone Music Entertainment

=== Part 1 ===
Released on October 6, 2019
No.	Title	Lyrics	Music	Artist	Length
1.	"Right In Front Of You" (네 앞에)	Park Geun-chul; DANI; Jung Su-min	Park Geun-chul; Jung Su-min; DANI	K.Will	4:00
2.	"Right In Front Of You" (Inst.)		Park Geun-chul; Jung Su-min; DANI		4:00
Total length:					8:00

=== Part 2 ===
Released on October 14, 2019
No.	Title	Lyrics	Music	Artist	Length
1.	"You Have To Tell Me" (꼭 말해줘)	Han Jae-wan; Jayins	Han Jae-wan; Jayins	Yeonjung (WJSN)	03:13
2.	"You Have To Tell Me" (Inst.)		Han Jae-wan; Jayins		03:13
Total length:					06:26

=== Part 3 ===
Released on October 20, 2019
No.	Title	Lyrics	Music	Artist	Length
1.	"When Love Passes By" (사랑이 지나가면)	Lee Young-hoon	Lee Young-hoon	Ji Chang-wook	04:11
2.	"When Love Passes By" (Inst.)		Lee Young-hoon		04:11
Total length:					08:22

=== Part 4 ===
Released on October 27, 2019
No.	Title	Lyrics	Music	Artist	Length
1.	"Ice Doll" (얼음인형)	Park Geun-chul; dani	Park Geun-chul; Jung Goo-hyun	Parc Jae-jung	4:10
2.	"Ice Doll" (Inst.)		Park Geun-chul; Jung Goo-hyun		4:10
Total length:					8:20

== Ratings ==
Melting Me Softly : South Korea viewers per episode (thousands)

Season	Episode number																Average
Season	1	2	3	4	5	6	7	8	9	10	11	12	13	14	15	16	Average
1	652	816	882	864	536	658	547	701	299	511	330	429	453	456	379	549	566

Source: Audience measurement performed nationwide by Nielsen Media Research.

Average TV viewership ratings
Ep.	Original broadcast date	Title	Average audience share (Nielsen Korea)	
Ep.	Original broadcast date	Title	Nationwide	Seoul
1	September 28, 2019	The Origin Of Cryogenics	2.486%	2.606%
2	September 29, 2019	Resurrection	3.177%	2.858%
3	October 5, 2019	The Days We Lost	3.163%	3.278%
4	October 6, 2019	Some Like It Cold	3.201%	3.250%
5	October 12, 2019	The Destiny Of 31.5 Degree!	2.063%	2.126%
6	October 13, 2019	Captain Korea	2.481%	2.777%
7	October 19, 2019	All About Love	1.843%	2.101%
8	October 20, 2019	Fling and Fight	2.419%	2.511%
9	October 26, 2019	Between the Cold and the Passion	1.160%	N/A
10	October 27, 2019	Non, Je Ne Regrette Rien	2.074%	1.983%
11	November 2, 2019	Family, After All	1.461%	N/A
12	November 3, 2019	To Die or To Be Mad	1.622%	N/A
13	November 9, 2019	The Truth Too Late	1.774%	1.491%
14	November 10, 2019	The People Who Want To Get Frozen	1.765%	1.271%
15	November 16, 2019	Hot Guy and Cold Girl	1.432%	N/A
16	November 17, 2019	Melting Me Softly	2.282%	2.407%
Average			2.150%	— (Note: Due to some ratings not recorded, the exact average rating is unknown.)
In the table above, the blue numbers represent the lowest ratings and the red numbers represent the highest ratings.; N/A denotes that the rating is not known.; This drama aired on a cable channel/pay TV which normally has a relatively smaller audience compared to free-to-air TV/public broadcasters (KBS, SBS, MBC and EBS).
