= Flower Grandpa Investigation Unit =

2014 South Korean TV series

- Promotional poster
- Also known as: Grandpas Over Flowers Investigation Unit; Flower Grandpa Investigative Team; Grandpas Over Flowers Investigation Team; Flower Grandpa Investigators
- Genre: Comedy
- Written by: Moon Sun-hee; Yoo Nam-kyung
- Directed by: Kim Jin-young
- Starring: Lee Soon-jae; Byun Hee-bong; Jang Gwang; Kim Hee-chul
- Country of origin: South Korea
- Original language: Korean
- No. of episodes: 12

Production
- Production location: Korea
- Running time: Fridays at 21:50 (KST)
- Production company: SSD

Original release
- Network: tvN
- Release: May 9 – July 25, 2014

Flower Grandpa Investigation Unit (Korean: 꽃할배 수사대; RR: Kkothalbae susadae) is a 2014 South Korean television series starring Lee Soon-jae, Byun Hee-bong, Jang Gwang and Kim Hee-chul. It aired on tvN from May 9 to July 25, 2014 on Fridays at 21:50 for 12 episodes.

== Plot ==
The lives of four detectives in their twenties are changed forever when after an experiment gone awry, three of them rapidly age overnight and find themselves in the bodies of old men in their seventies (only one, Park Jung-woo, emerges unscathed and stays young). As his suddenly much older colleagues comically struggle to deal with their new and unusual predicament, Jung-woo shares in their hardships, joining them in their mission to find a way to reclaim their lost youth. Meanwhile, the team also continues to solve crimes, while the "grandpas" work at a delivery service as their cover.

== Cast ==
=== Main characters ===
- Lee Soon-jae as Lee Joon-hyuk (70s)
  - Choi Jin-hyuk as Lee Joon-hyuk (29)
  - Shin Dong-woo as teenage Lee Joon-hyuk

The brains of the operation. He has a photographic memory and never forgets a single detail, and is widely known in the precinct for being cold-hearted and selfish, who probably wouldn't even bleed if you pricked his finger. But one day he works a strange case, and wakes up having aged fifty years overnight. Suddenly he can't remember even the simplest details because he's battling senility. And he has to watch helplessly as his fiancée questions why her boyfriend just vanished into thin air three months before their wedding.

- Kim Hee-chul as Park Jung-woo (29)

The precinct's golden boy, the only son of the chief of police who was born with a silver spoon in his mouth. He's the only one who escapes the aging spell.

- Byun Hee-bong as Han Won-bin (70s)
  - Park Min-woo as Han Won-bin (29)

The Casanova of the group, who pretty much skates by in life with his looks and charm. But when he wakes up as an old man, he finds his face covered in wrinkles and doesn't know how to function when he can't get anyone — even ajummas — to look his way.

- Jang Gwang as Jeon Kang-seok (70s)
  - Park Doo-shik as Jeon Kang-seok (28)

The youngest of the group at 28, he's a former national boxer. Of course in an elderly body, he finds that he can't kick anything without throwing out his back.

=== Supporting characters ===
- Lee Cho-hee as Jung Eun-ji, female detective
- Kim Eung-soo as Kim Young-chul, head of investigation unit
- Park Eun-ji as Han Yoo-ra, Joon-hyuk's fiancée
- Kim Byung-se as Choi Jae-wook, deputy department head
- Shin Kwi-shik as Park Jin-woo, police commissioner
- Kim Sun-young as Joon-hyuk's mother
- Kim Byung-choon as Joon-hyuk's father
- Seo Ye-hwa as Lee Soo-jung, Joon-hyuk's younger sister
- Ha Gyu-won as Lee Ji-hyun
- Son Young-soon as Choi Jae-wook's wife
- Park Hyo-joo as Jeon Hye-jin
- Kwon Eun-soo as Guem Mae-sil
- Lee Ki-woo as Park Tae-min
- Lee Seung-ho as Jung Myung-ho
- Lee Tae-hyung as Charlie Jung

=== Guest appearances ===
- Sam Hammington as Russian robber (ep 1)
- Kwon Mina as Han Seol-hee (ep 3, 6)
- Lee Yong-nyeo as Han Seol-hee's maid (ep 3)
- Kim Jin-soo as Michael Kim (ep 4)
- Heo Jae-ho as Song Jin-chul (ep 4)
- Yoo Soo-jeong as Oh Jin-hee (ep 4)
- Kwon Min-joong as Sous chef (ep 4)
- Choi Young-shin as Jo-eun (ep 5)
- Jung Jin as Manager Jung (ep 5)
- Ahn Sung-hoon as Jung-hoon (ep 5)
- Jung In-young as Kang So-ri (ep 6)
- Heo Jin as Kang So-ri's mother (ep 6)
- Jang Se-hyun as Fortuneteller (ep 6)
- Lee Chul-min as Loan shark boss (ep 6)
- Choi Ji-ho as Kang So-ri's manager (ep 6)
- Choi Dong-yip as Film director (ep 6)
- Kim Do-yeon as Hair salon employee (ep 6, 8)
- Byung Hun as Uhm Si-woo (ep 7)
- Park Sung-joon as Kim Min-woo (ep 7)
- Na Chang-yup as Choi Min-ho (ep 7)
- Park Hyo-bin as Kim Jae-hee (ep 7)
- Woo Jin-hee as Kwon Bo-mi (ep 7)
- Han Je-in as Lee Eun-joo (ep 7)
- Lee Jae-wook as Flasher Park Young-gil (ep 7)
- Kim Dong-kyun as Waxing employee (ep 7)
- Jung Min-sung as School security guard (ep 7)
- Woo Sang-jeon as Jo Joong-go (ep 8)
- Oh Jung-tae as Joo Tae-baek (ep 8)
- Kim Choo-wol as Literature expert (ep 10)
- Lee Sang-hong as Kim Joong-eun (ep 11)
- Min Ji-won as Won-bin's girlfriend (ep 12)

== Ratings ==
Ep.	Broadcast date	AGB Nielsen (Average rating)
1	May 9, 2014	2.742%
2	May 16, 2014	1.710%
3	May 23, 2014	1.474%
4	May 30, 2014	1.445%
5	June 6, 2014	1.191%
6	June 13, 2014	1.106%
7	June 20, 2014	1.083%
8	June 27, 2014	1.290%
9	July 4, 2014	1.331%
10	July 11, 2014	0.839%
11	July 18, 2014	0.775%
12	July 25, 2014	1.036%
Average		1.335%

== International broadcast ==
- Philippines - TV5 - June 2015
