= Choi Jin-hyuk =

South Korean actor

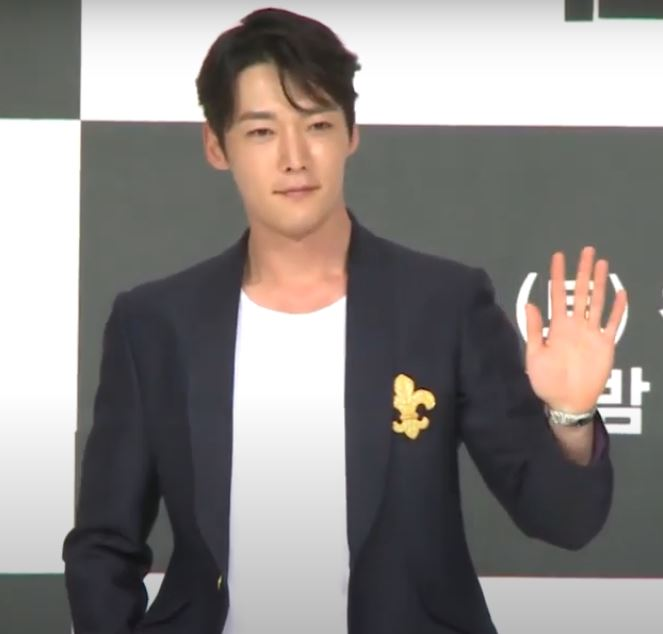
- Choi in March 2017
- Born: Kim Tae-ho; February 9, 1986 (age 40); Mokpo, South Korea
- Occupation: Actor
- Years active: 2006–present
- Agent: Workaholic Entertainment
- Height: 1.87 m (6 ft 2 in)

Korean name
- Hangul: 김태호
- Hanja: 金太昊
- RR: Gim Taeho
- MR: Kim T'aeho

Stage name
- Hangul: 최진혁
- RR: Choe Jinhyeok
- MR: Ch'oe Chinhyŏk

Choi Jin-hyuk (Korean: 최진혁; born Kim Tae-ho, February 9, 1986) is a South Korean actor. He gained attention for his supporting roles in Gu Family Book (2013) and The Heirs (2013), and then went on to star in lead roles in Emergency Couple (2014), Pride and Prejudice (2014–2015), Tunnel (2017), Devilish Charm (2018), The Last Empress (2018–2019), and Rugal (2020).

== Career ==
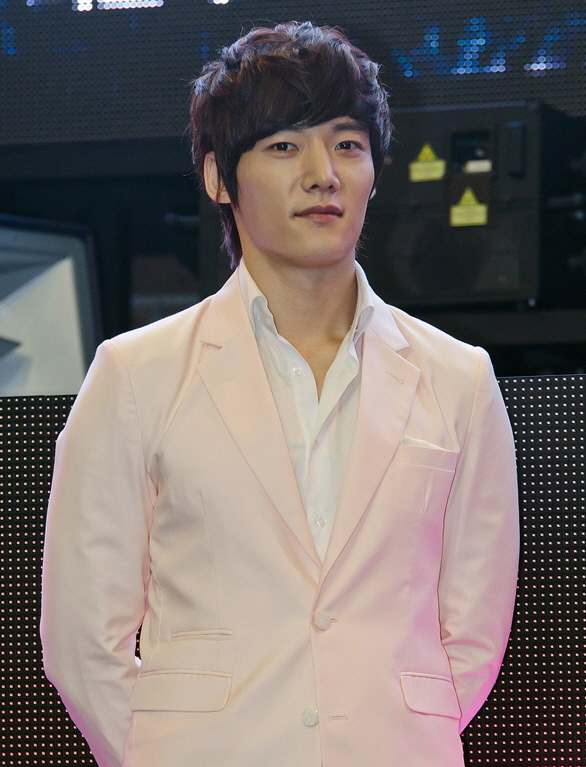
Choi in 2011

Kim Tae-ho launched his acting career after he won the grand prize in the KBS reality talent show Survival Star Audition in 2006. He began using the stage name Choi Jin-hyuk in 2010, prior to the airing of family drama It's Okay, Daddy's Girl, in which he was cast in his first leading role. He also starred in the romantic comedies I Need Romance (2011), and Miss Panda and Mr. Hedgehog (2012). Choi made his big-screen debut in the romance film Love Clinique.

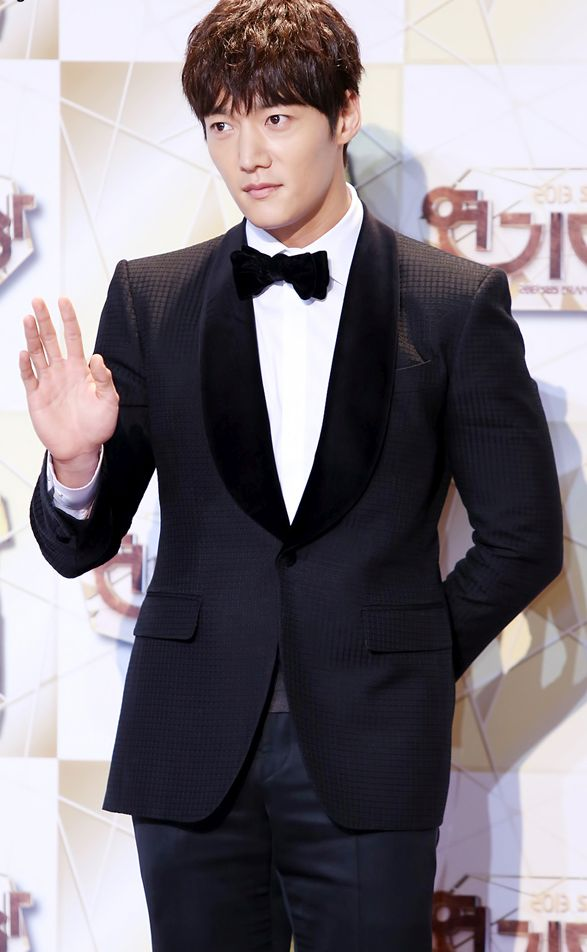
Choi in 2013

His breakout came in 2013 after a well-received appearance on fantasy-period drama Gu Family Book. Afterwards, Choi landed supporting roles in two high-profile projects: writer Kim Eun-sook's trendy drama The Heirs, and the action film The Divine Move. His costar in The Divine Move, Jung Woo-sung also directed him in the short film Beginning of a Dream (Choi had joined Jung's agency Red Brick House).

In 2014, he headlined his first miniseries, the cable romantic comedy/medical drama Emergency Couple. Choi then returned to network television with a supporting role in You Are My Destiny, a remake of the 2008 Taiwanese drama. Another leading role followed with the legal drama Pride and Prejudice. He was also cast in a minor role in the Japanese film Koisuru Vampire ("Vampire in Love").

Choi went on a hiatus from acting when he enlisted for mandatory military service on March 31, 2015. He had the option to join the Seoul Police Promotional Team, the theater unit under the Seoul Metropolitan Police Agency, but choose to serve as an active duty soldier. He was discharged from the army after just seven months due to a knee injury.

Choi made his return with the crime thriller Tunnel, which was a hit in China. In 2018, he was cast in the romantic comedy drama Devilish Charm, and mystery thriller series The Last Empress.

In 2019, Choi was cast in the thriller drama Justice.

In 2020, Choi starred in the science fiction action drama Rugal and Zombie Detective. He also made a special appearance in TVN smash-hit drama Mr. Queen as an arrogant and flirty chef whose soul was trapped in Shin Hye-sun's body back in the Joseon era. He also lends his voice to Shin Hye-sun's character's inner thought for first 7 episodes. In February 2023, he also held a fan-meeting event in Taiwan. In October 2023, he signed with Workaholic Entertainment.

In November 2024, Choi made his first fan-meeting concert in the Philippines, at the New Frontier Theater. Prior to the event, he also appeared on a Filipino television variety show.

In 2026, Choi starred in Channel A's romantic comedy television series Positively Yours opposite Oh Yeon-seo. It is based on the Naver Webtoon of the same name by Lee Jung about a couple averse to marriage until a one-night stand changes their plans.

== Filmography ==
=== Film ===
Year	Title	Role	Notes	Ref.
2012	Love Clinique	Park Min-soo		
2013	Beginning of a Dream	Kim Jun-su	Short film	
2014	The Divine Move	Sun-soo		
2015	Koisuru Vampire	Mike		

=== Television series ===
Year	Title	Role	Notes	Ref.
2006	Rainbow Romance	High school student	Bit part	
2006–2007	Just Run!	Lee Hyuk-jin		
2007	Drama City: "A Neighborhood for Young People"	Kim Byung-yong		
2007–2008	Belle	Oh Jae-hyuk		
2008	Nine-tailed Fox	Hyo-moon		
2008–2009	My Precious You	Ha Dong-woo		
2009	Come with Me to Hell	Lee Rang		
2010	Pasta	Sunwoo Deok		
2010–2011	It's Okay, Daddy's Girl	Choi Hyuk-ki		
2011	I Need Romance	Bae Sung-hyun		
2011–2012	My Daughter the Flower	Gu Sang-hyuk		
2012	Miss Panda and Mr. Hedgehog	Choi Won-il		
2013	Gu Family Book	Gu Wol-ryung		
2013	The Heirs	Kim Won		
2014	Emergency Couple	Oh Chang-min		
2014	Flower Grandpa Investigation Unit	young Lee Joon-hyuk	Cameo	
2014	You Are My Destiny	Daniel Pitt		
2014–2015	Pride and Prejudice	Gu Dong-chi		
2017	Tunnel	Park Gwang-ho		
2018	Devilish Charm	Gong Ma-seong		
2018–2019	The Last Empress	Na Wang-sik / Cheon Woo-Bin		
2019	Justice	Lee Tae-kyung		
2019	Flower Crew: Joseon Marriage Agency	Military Officer	Cameo (Episode 5)	
2020	Rugal	Kang Ki-Beom		
2020	Zombie Detective	Kim Moo-young		
2020–2021	Mr. Queen	Jang Bong-hwan	Cameo	
2021	KBS Drama Special: "Siren"	Choi Tae-seung		
2023	Numbers	Han Seung-jo		
2024	Miss Night and Day	Gye Ji-woong		
2026	Positively Yours	Kang Doo-joon		

=== Television shows ===
Year	Title	Role	Notes	Ref.
2006	Survival Star Audition	Contestant		
2010	Star Photographer Tanssaenggi - Passionate Force	Cast member		
2013	MBC 10th Anniversary Special: From Dae Jang Geum to I Am a Singer	Host		
2019	My Ugly Duckling	Special host	Episode 162	
2021–present	My Ugly Duckling	Special cast	Episode 234–265, 293–present	
2024	It's Showtime	Guest	Philippine variety show	

=== Music video appearances ===
Year	Title	Artist	Ref.
2012	"Even If I Choke Up"	T.G.U.S.	
2013	"Sad Song"	Tae One	

== Discography ==
=== Soundtrack appearances ===
Title	Year	Album	Ref.
"Enough to Die"	2011	It's Okay, Daddy's Girl OST	
"Inverted Love"	2012	Miss Panda and Mr. Hedgehog OST	
"Best Wishes to You"	2013	Gu Family Book OST	
"Don't Look Back"	2013	The Heirs OST	
"Scent of a Flower"	2014	Emergency Couple OST	
"The Love I Tried to Forget"	2018	Devilish Charm OST	

== Awards and nominations ==
Name of the award ceremony, year presented, category, nominee of the award, and the result of the nomination
Award ceremony	Year	Category	Nominee / Work	Result	Ref.
APAN Star Awards	2013	Best New Actor	Gu Family Book	Won	
Asia Rainbow TV Awards	2014	Outstanding Supporting Actor	Gu Family Book	Won	
Baeksang Arts Awards	2014	Best New Actor – Television	Gu Family Book	Nominated	
Blue Dragon Film Awards	2014	Best New Actor	The Divine Move	Nominated	
DramaFever Awards	2015	Best Couple Award	Choi Jin-hyuk (with Song Ji-hyo); Emergency Couple	Nominated	
Grand Bell Awards	2014	Best New Actor	The Divine Move	Nominated	
KBS Drama Awards	2019	Excellence Award, Actor in a Miniseries	Justice	Nominated	
KBS Drama Awards	2019	Netizen Award, Actor	Justice	Nominated	
KBS Drama Awards	2019	Best Couple Award	Choi Jin-hyuk (with Nana); Justice	Nominated	
KBS Drama Awards	2020	Excellence Award, Actor in a Miniseries	Zombie Detective	Nominated	
KBS Drama Awards	2021	Best Actor in Drama Special/TV Cinema	Drama Special – Siren	Nominated	
KBS Entertainment Awards	2020	Best Challenge Award	Zombie Detective	Won	
KBS Survival Star Audition	2006	Grand Prize (Daesang)	Choi Jin-hyuk	Won	
Korea Drama Awards	2014	Excellence Award, Actor	The Heirs	Nominated	
MBC Drama Awards	2013	Best New Actor	Gu Family Book	Nominated	
MBC Drama Awards	2014	Excellence Award, Actor in a Special Project Drama	Pride and Prejudice	Won	
MBC Drama Awards	2014	Popularity Award, Actor	Pride and Prejudice	Nominated	
MBC Drama Awards	2014	Best Couple Award	Choi Jin-hyuk (with Baek Jin-hee); Pride and Prejudice	Nominated	
SBS Drama Awards	2013	New Star Award	The Heirs	Won	
SBS Drama Awards	2018	Top Excellence Award, Actor in a Wednesday-Thursday Drama	The Last Empress	Won	
SBS Entertainment Awards	2021	Grand Prize (Daesang) (Note: with Shin Dong-yup, Seo Jang-hoon, Cho Hye-seon, Kim Sun-ja, Park Young-hye, Tak Jae-hoon, Im Won-hee, Kim Joon-ho, Kim Jong-kook, Kim Hee-chul, Lee Tae-sung, Oh Min-suk, Park Goon, Lee Sang-min)	My Little Old Boy	Won	
SBS Entertainment Awards	2024	Excellence Award, Male	My Little Old Boy	Won	
SBS Entertainment Awards	2025	Top Excellence Award (Reality)	My Little Old Boy	Won	
Style Icon Awards	2013	Best K-Style Award	Choi Jin-hyuk	Won	
Style Icon Awards	2014	Top 10 Style Icon	Choi Jin-hyuk	Nominated	
