= Devilish Charm =

2018 South Korean television series

- Promotional poster
- Hangul: 마성의 기쁨
- RR: Maseongui gippeum
- MR: Masŏngŭi kippŭm
- Genre: Romantic comedy
- Written by: Choi Ji-yeon
- Directed by: Kim Ga-ram
- Starring: Choi Jin-hyuk; Song Ha-yoon; Lee Ho-won; Lee Joo-yeon
- Country of origin: South Korea
- Original language: Korean
- No. of episodes: 16

Production
- Executive producer: Kim Yong-hoon
- Production locations: South Korea; Hainan, China
- Camera setup: Single-camera
- Production companies: Golden Thumb Pictures; iHQ

Original release
- Network: MBN; Dramax
- Release: September 5 – October 25, 2018

Devilish Charm (Korean: 마성의 기쁨) (Note: A play on the first names of lead characters Gong Ma-seong and Ju Gi-ppeum, which can also mean Ma-seong's Gi-ppeum when literally translated.) is a 2018 South Korean television series starring Choi Jin-hyuk, Song Ha-yoon, Lee Ho-won, and Lee Joo-yeon. It aired on MBN and Dramax from September 5 to October 25, 2018, every Wednesday and Thursday at 23:00 (KST) for 16 episodes.

== Synopsis ==
The love story of a genius doctor who suffers from "Cinderella Memory Disorder", in which the memories of the previous day disappear at twelve o'clock, and a washed-up actress.

== Cast ==
=== Main ===
- Choi Jin-hyuk as Gong Ma-seong (34 years old), the successor of Sunwoo Group who is a doctor and chief of a cranial nerve center. After a car accident where he tries to help a woman he happens to meet, he suffers from short-term amnesia, and his memory does not last for more than a day.
  - Choi Seung-hoon as young Gong Ma-seong
- Song Ha-yoon as Ju Gi-ppeum (30 years old), a top actress who falls from grace due to a false charge.
- Lee Ho-won as Sung Ki-joon (31 years old), Ma-seong's younger cousin who is an entertainer, and whose dream is to become a Hallyu star. He is the second-in-line-heir to Sunwoo Group, but is not interested in business.
  - Seo Yoon-hyuk as young Sung Ki-joon
- Lee Joo-yeon as Lee Ha-im (34 years old), an ambitious A-list actress who is the only child of a rich family.

=== Supporting ===
- Lee Soo-ji as Go Nan-ju, Gi-ppeum's former stylist.
- Kim Min-sang as Dr. Yoon, Ma-seong's doctor.
- Jung Soo-gyo as Kim Beom-soo, the current representative of Ha-im from her agency.
- Kang Yoon-je as Ju Ja-rang, Gi-ppeum's brother.
- Kim Ji-young as Ju Sa-rang, Gi-ppeum's sister.
- Oh Kwang-rok as Ju Man-sik, Gi-ppeum's father.
- Jung Ae-hwa
- Kim Do-yeon as Gong Jin-dan
- Jang In-sub as Yang Woo-jin
- Jeon Soo-kyeong as Gong Jin-yang, Ma-seong's aunt.

=== Special appearances ===
- Lee Jung-hyuk as Min Hyung-joon
- Kwon Hyuk-soo as an internet program director
- Ahn Se-ha as Myung Seok-hwan
- Park Soo-ah as Kang Song-hwa

== Production ==
=== Filming ===
Filming started in May 2018 and was fully pre-produced before its premiere.

=== Controversy ===
In October 2018, reports revealed the unpaid wages issue of actors and some staff members. The series' production company Golden Thumb Pictures commented on an official statement that all payments would be settled by the end of November. However, in December, it was reported that not all of the cast members had been paid yet, including lead actresses Song Ha-yoon and Lee Joo-yeon. Golden Thumb Pictures then promised to pay everyone by December 31.

On January 2, 2019, actress Song Ha-yoon's agency JYP Entertainment shared their plans on taking all possible legal action including civil and criminal lawsuits against the parties affiliated with the unpaid wages for Devilish Charm, as they had yet to receive their full payments. Broadcasting company iHQ remarked that the issue had to be settled by Golden Thumb Pictures as the wages were contracted between them and the actors.
