= Park Doo-shik =

South Korean actor (born 1988)

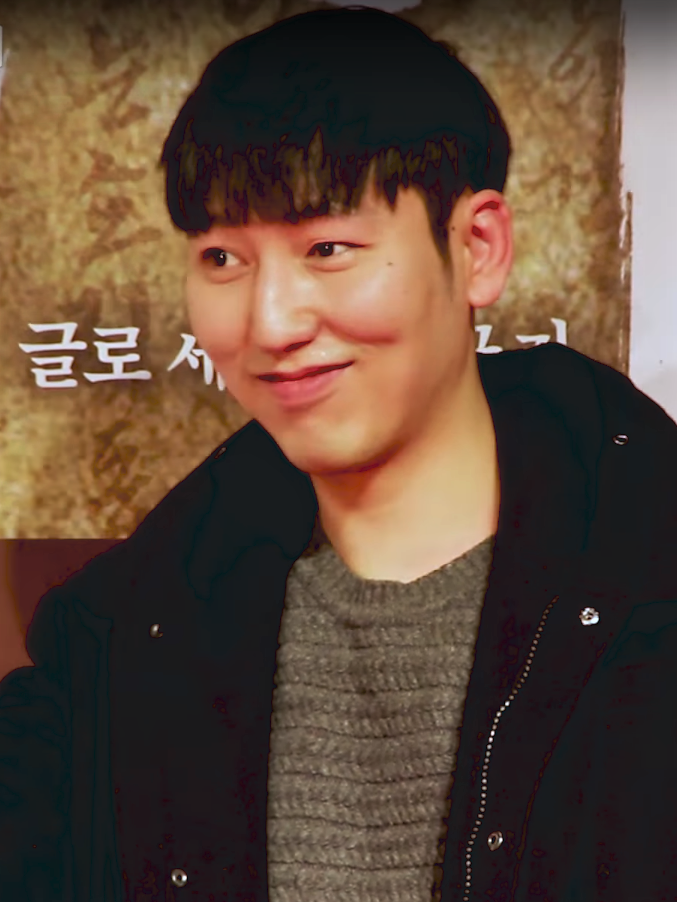
- Park in 2018
- Born: Park Doo-shik; 1 January 1988 (age 38); Incheon, South Korea
- Other name: Bak Du-sik
- Education: Kookmin University (Bachelor of Arts in Theater and Film)
- Occupations: Actor; model
- Years active: 2013–present
- Agent: Jupiter Entertainment
- Known for: Gangsters (2019); Who Are You: School 2015; Heroes (2015)

Park Doo-shik (born 1 January 1988) is a South Korean actor. He is known for his main roles in movie Gangsters (2019) and dramas such as Drama Stage Season 2: All About My Rival in Love, Heroes (2015). Park also appeared in the famous and popular drama of School series, Who Are You: School 2015 as Kwon Gi Tae.

== Filmography ==
=== Film ===
Year	Title	Role	Ref.
2013	Fists of Legend	Shin Jae Seok	
2014	Mad Sad Bad	Man	
2014	The Girl's Ghost Story (2014)	Hae Chul	
2014	Fashion King (film)	Song Chul	
2014	Big Match (film)	Detective Nam	
2015	Shoot Me in the Heart	Jeom Bak-yi	
2015	Enemies In-Law	Min Goo	
2017	New Trial (film)	Tae Goo	
2019	Gangsters	Yong Gae	
2020	Hitman: Agent Jun	Simon	
2020	Close to You	Detective Joe	

=== Television series ===
Year	Title	Role	Ref.
2013	I Can Hear Your Voice	Kim Choong Ki	
2014	Emergency Couple	Kim Gwang Soo	
2014	Flower Grandpa Investigation Unit	Jun Kang Suk	
2014	My Lovely Girl	Cha Gong Chul	
2015	Who Are You: School 2015	Kwon Gi Tae	
2015	The Time We Were Not in Love	Eun Dae Yoon	
2015	Heroes	Goo Nam	
2016	The Vampire Detective	Choi Cheol Woo	
2016–2017	Dr. Romantic	Patient Soo Jung's boyfriend	
2017	Witch at Court	Kim Dong Shik	
2017	Black	Je Soo Dong	
2018	Sketch	Jung Il Soo	
2018	Drama Stage Season 2: "All About My Rival in Love"	Ji Seok	
2018	The Last Empress	Team Lead Hong's son	
2019	Pegasus Market	Gangster boss	
2021	Undercover	Do Young-geol	
2022	Love All Play	Koo Hyuk-bong	

=== Web series ===
Year	Title	Role	Ref.
2022	A Model Family	Min Gyu	

== Awards and nominations ==
- Nomination - Best New Actor - Park Doo-sik
