= Oh Ah-rin =

South Korean actress (born 2011)

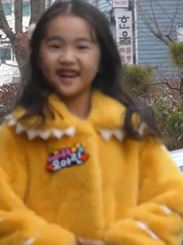
- Oh in 2019
- Born: 2 May 2011 (age 15); Seoul
- Occupation: Actress
- Years active: 2015–present
- Agent: Sidus HQ

Korean name
- Hangul: 오아린
- Hanja: 吳兒璘
- RR: O Arin
- MR: O Arin

Oh Ah-rin (Korean: 오아린; born 2 May 2011) is a South Korean child actress. She made her acting debut in 2015, and, since then, she has appeared in number of films and television series. She is known for her various roles as a child actor, including appearances in The Last Empress (2018) and Kingdom (2019–2020). She has also acted in films such as Trick and The My Little Brother, amongst others. In 2021 she appeared in the historical TV series River Where the Moon Rises.

== Early life and career ==
Born as the eldest of two daughters in Seoul on 2 May 2011, she made her debut in commercial film in CJ CheilJedang for Welkiz in 2015. Her dream is to become actor now and later a director. In an interview she said, "I write the title and lines for a skit and act it out with a sibling who is two years younger than I am. My sibling acts the lines I wrote, and I film it like a director. So I want to be a director and writer later, but I want to be a good actor for now."

In 2017, Oh appeared in TV series Band of Sisters, for which she was nominated for Youth Acting Award at 2017 SBS Drama Awards. In 2018, she was again nominated for Youth Acting Award at 2018 SBS Drama Awards for her role as Ah-ri in the series The Last Empress. In 2019 came Melting Me Softly and in 2021 River Where the Moon Rises.

== Filmography ==
=== Films ===
Year	Title	Role	Notes	Ref.
2016	Trick	Kang So-in		
2016	My Little Brother	Kindergarten bus kid		
2017	Behead the King	Beon-jwa		
2017	Snatch Up			
2018	Deja Vu	Apartment Complex Child		

=== Television series ===
Year	Title	Role	Notes	Ref.
2016	Squad 38	Convenience store child		
2016	Always Spring	Young Joo Se-eun		
2016	Guardian: The Lonely and Great God	Hospital child		
2017	Strong Girl Bong-soon	Balloon girl		
2017	Band of Sisters	Jin Hong-si	Nominated for SBS Drama Awards	
2017-18	A Korean Odyssey	Lee Soo-jung		
2018	Should We Kiss First?	Lee Ji-hoo		
2018	About Time	Yoon Ah-in		
2018	Life on Mars	Young-joo		
2018	The Last Empress	Ah-ri	Nominated for SBS Drama Awards	
2019	Melting Me Softly	Ma Seo-yoon		
2019	VIP	Ha Rim	Special appearance	
2019-20	Kingdom	Deok-i's younger sister		
2021	River Where the Moon Rises	Wol-yi		
2021	At a Distance, Spring Is Green	Young Kim So-bin		

=== Web series ===
Year	Title	Role	Notes	Ref.
2022	Rookie Cops	young Go Eun-gang		

== Awards and nominations ==
Year	Award	Category	Nominated work	Result	Ref.
2017	SBS Drama Awards	Youth Acting Award	Band of Sisters	Nominated	
2018	SBS Drama Awards	Youth Acting Award	The Last Empress	Nominated	
2019	2019 Korea First Brand Grand Prize	Child Actor	Oh Ah-rin	Won	
