= Band of Sisters (TV series) =

2017 South Korean television series

- Promotional poster
- Also known as: Unni Is Alive
- Hangul: 언니는 살아있다
- Lit.: Sister Is Alive
- RR: Eonnineun saraitda
- MR: Ŏnninŭn saraitta
- Genre: Melodrama; Family; Revenge; Romance; Comedy
- Written by: Kim Soon-ok
- Directed by: Choi Young-hoon
- Starring: Jang Seo-hee; Kim Ju-hyeon; Oh Yoon-ah; Kim Da-som
- Music by: Ha Geun-young (SBS Content Hub )
- Country of origin: South Korea
- Original language: Korean
- No. of episodes: 68 (Note: Following a repacking of episodes, what would previously have been aired as two 60 minute episodes are being repackaged as four 35 minute episodes beginning with Episodes 41-44, with four episodes being shown each night with three commercial breaks. As a result, eight more 35-minute episodes were added to the original episode count.)

Production
- Executive producer: Ahn Suk-joon
- Producers: Lee Yong Suk (SBS); Jo Eun jung
- Editor: Shin-sik
- Running time: 70 minutes (Episodes 1-40); 35 minutes (Episodes 41-68)
- Production company: FNC Add Culture
- Budget: ₩14.5 billion

Original release
- Network: SBS TV
- Release: April 15 – October 14, 2017

Band of Sisters (Korean: 언니는 살아있다; RR: Eonnineun saraitda) is a 2017 South Korean television series starring Jang Seo-hee, Kim Ju-hyeon, Kim Da-som and Oh Yoon-ah. It aired on SBS TV every Saturday at 20:45 and 21:55 KST (two episodes per day), taking the slot previously occupied by Our Gap-soon.

== Plot ==
Kang Ha-ri (Kim Ju-hyeon), with her bright personality, works part-time at a stationery store and a nail shop. Min Deul-rae (Jang Seo-hee) was a popular actress, but she isn't so popular these days. Kim Eun-hyang (Oh Yoon-ah) worked as a secretary prior to the birth of her daughter, but she now focuses on raising her. These three women lost their most beloved (Ha-ri's fiancé, Dal-rae's mother and Eun-hyang's daughter) during a singular accident cause by Yang Dal-hee (who murdered and impersonated a rich heiress from the States, Sera Park). Even though they are not related, they rely on each other to get through the tough time and reveal the truth. As the truth unravels, this web of lies draw in many other seemingly innocent by-standers. This new sisterhood must now decide whether revenge is worth the collateral damage.

== Cast ==
=== Main ===
- Jang Seo-hee as Min Deul-rae

A famous actress whose popularity is on the decline. Immature and spoiled by her mother, who does everything for her. She seeks revenge for her mother, who died while trying to protect her daughter from a stalker's assault. The police vehicle that would've saved her mother was involved in a multi-vehicle crash.

- Oh Yoon-ah as Kim Eun-hyang

Former corporate secretary and loving, yet overbearing, mother to her seven-year-old daughter Ah-reum. She seeks revenge for her daughter, who died in a house fire. Choo Tae-soo, her husband, had left their daughter sleeping with a lit candle. The fire truck that would've saved Ah-reum was involved in a multi-vehicle crash.

- Kim Ju-hyeon as Kang Ha-ri

An orphan who inherited her parents' stationery shop, and is raising her teenage sister. Now a widow, her husband died in a car accident on her wedding day. The ambulance carrying her husband to the hospital was overturned in a multi-vehicle crash.

- Kim Da-som as Yang Dal-hee / Sera Park

An ambitious antagonist. After being mistreated under Sera Park's employ, and an altercation which leaves Sera Park in a coma, Yang Dal-hee moves back to South Korea and assumes the identity of Sera Park. She is the ex-girlfriend of Seol Gi-Chan, and she stole his chamomile and sold it to Goo Se-kyung of Ruby Cosmetics. She is the one responsible for the multi-vehicle crash. She disowns her younger stepsister, Jin Hong-shi. She is intent on marrying Goo Se-joon, as he is the heir to Ruby Cosmetics.

- Lee Ji-hoon as Seol Gi-chan

A bright entrepreneur, he is the son of Ruby Cosmetics' Goo Pil-mo and his late wife, but was raised in an orphanage. His beauty serum derived from chamomile was stolen by his ex-girlfriend, Yang Dal-hee.

- Cho Yoon-woo as Goo Se-joon

The illegitimate son of Ruby Cosmetics chairman Goo Pil-mo and the maid, Ms. Lee. He leans heavily on his grandmother, Sa Goon-ja, for support. He later develops a crush on Kang Ha-Ri.

=== Supporting ===
==== People related to Ha-ri ====
- Ahn Nae-sang as Na Dae-in (father-in-law)
- Hwang Young-hee as Go Sang-mi (mother-in-law)
- Sung Hyuk as Na Jae-il (deceased husband)
- Lee Jae-jin as Na Jae-dong (brother-in-law)
- Jin Ji-hee as Kang Ha-sae (sister-in-law)
- Oh Ah-rin as Jin Hong-si

==== People related to Deul-rae ====
- Sung Byung-suk as Deul-rae's mother

==== People related to Eun-hyang ====
- Park Gwang-hyun as Joo Tae-soo

Eun-hyang's husband, who is having a secret affair with Go Se-kyung.

==== People related to Dal-hee ====
- Son Yeo-eun as Goo Se-kyung

The daughter of Goo Pil-mo, she is deputy director and heiress of Ruby Cosmetics. She has had an affair with Choo Tae-soo for three years, and is the mother of Jo Yong-ha, but largely neglects him. She targeted Seol Gi-chan by cutting the brakes on his car. Kim Eun-hyang holds her responsible for the death of Ah-reum, but later they become friends.

==== People related to Se-kyung ====
- Kim Soo-mi as Sa Goon-ja

The mother of Goo Pil-mo and Goo Pil-soon. She suspects Seol Gi-chan of being her long-lost grandson Se-hoo.

- Son Chang-min as Goo Pil-mo

The chairman of Ruby Cosmetics. He mourns his late wife, who died not long after his legitimate son, Se Ho, went missing. He falls in love with actress Min Deul-re, who is a dead ringer for his late wife.

- Byun Jung-soo as Goo Pil-soon

The fun-loving unmarried sister of Goo Pil-mo. She dotes on her pug, Juice.

- Song Jong-ho as Jo Han-sung

The husband of Goo Se-kyung, he was formerly a country boy, and also works at Ruby Cosmetics.

- Kim Seung-han as Jo Yong-ha

The son of Goo Se-kyung and Jo Han-sung, he has a reactive autistic disorder that doctors believe stems from a lack of affection. He is largely ignored by his mother, yet close to his father and to his tutor, Kim Eun-hyung.

- Yang Jung-a as Lee Gye-hwa

The scheming maid and mother of Goo Se-joon. She is responsible for kicking Goo Se-ho out of the home when he was a child, and for the death of Sa Goon-ja.

==== Extended ====
- Kim Nam-hee as Choi Young-hoon
- Lee Ga-ryeong as Chae-rin
- Kim Jae-hyun as Jae-hyun
- Song Ha-yoon as Sera Park

A New Jersey-born chaebol daughter and Dal-hee's spoiled client, she was heavily injured in an altercation with the latter at her own house. Sera Park is later revealed to have regained consciousness, despite losing her sight.

- Jeon Soo-kyeong as Vicky Jung

The mother of the real Sera Park, she discovers Yang Dal-hee has assumed the identity of her daughter.

- Lee Yu-ri as Yeon Min-jung (Note: Lee Yoo-ri's minor role in Band of Sisters is namesake with her villain role in the writer's 2014 MBC TV drama Jang Bo-ri Is Here!)

The assistant of Vicky Jung and a friend of Chairman Geum. She knew all about Yang Dal Hee's crimes. And she came to the ambulance to pick up Sa Goon-ja in order not to be caught by Yang Dal-hee.

== Production ==
- The first script reading took place March 8, 2017 at SBS Ilsan Production Studios in Goyang, South Korea.
- Jo Bo-ah was offered to portray Kang Ha-ri, but declined.
- Band of Sisters is written by Kim Soon-ok and directed by Choi Young-hoon. This is their second collaboration since Five Fingers in 2012.
- It is also the second time that Kim and Jang Seo-hee have worked together after Temptation of Wife.

Major photography locations

- SBS Broadcasting Center
- SBS Ilsan Production Center B Studio
- Baxter Studio
- Sangam-dong SBS Prism Tower

== Ratings ==
In the table below, the blue numbers represent the lowest ratings and the red numbers represent the highest ratings.

Ep.		Original broadcast date	Average audience share			
Ep.		Original broadcast date	TNmS Ratings		AGB Nielsen Ratings	
W	O	Original broadcast date	Nationwide	Seoul	Nationwide	Seoul
1		April 15, 2017	6.1% (19th)	6.4% (16th)	6.6% (14th)	7.1% (14th)
2		April 15, 2017	8.0% (10th)	8.6% (8th)	8.7% (7th)	9.4% (6th)
3		April 22, 2017	6.1% (17th)	7.0% (15th)	6.1% (17th)	6.8% (15th)
4		April 22, 2017	8.8% (10th)	9.7% (6th)	8.5% (9th)	9.2% (7th)
5		April 29, 2017	6.0% (16th)	7.3% (12th)	6.5% (15th)	6.6% (14th)
6		April 29, 2017	9.3% (9th)	11.2% (4th)	10.1% (4th)	10.3% (5th)
7		May 6, 2017 (Note: Brought back by 15 minutes due to a 2017 South Korean presidential election special report.)	6.8% (13th)	7.5% (11th)	7.1% (14th)	7.7% (12th)
8		May 6, 2017	11.1% (3rd)	12.5% (3rd)	12.2% (4th)	13.4% (3rd)
9		May 13, 2017	6.5% (14th)	7.3% (13th)	6.7% (15th)	7.2% (13th)
10		May 13, 2017	10.5% (5th)	10.8% (5th)	12.0% (2nd)	12.6% (2nd)
11		May 20, 2017	8.1% (10th)	8.7% (5th)	8.7% (7th)	9.2% (5th)
12		May 20, 2017	9.4% (6th)	10.6% (3rd)	10.9% (2nd)	11.5% (2nd)
13		May 27, 2017	6.4% (15th)	7.9% (8th)	7.1% (13th)	7.8% (10th)
14		May 27, 2017	10.5% (4th)	10.5% (3rd)	12.6% (2nd)	13.9% (2nd)
15		June 3, 2017	7.5% (13th)	9.0% (6th)	7.4% (13th)	7.6% (11th)
16		June 3, 2017	12.7% (2nd)	13.7% (2nd)	13.4% (2nd)	14.1% (2nd)
17		June 10, 2017	7.1% (12th)	8.0% (7th)	7.9% (8th)	8.6% (7th)
18		June 10, 2017	12.0% (2nd)	12.6% (3rd)	12.4% (2nd)	13.3% (2nd)
19		June 17, 2017	6.6% (15th)	7.2% (10th)	7.3% (12th)	7.7% (9th)
20		June 17, 2017	11.2% (2nd)	12.2% (3rd)	12.6% (2nd)	12.9% (3rd)
21		June 24, 2017	6.7% (17th)	7.9% (10th)	6.7% (18th)	7.1% (14th)
22		June 24, 2017	11.4% (3rd)	13.1% (2nd)	12.5% (3rd)	13.4% (2nd)
23		July 1, 2017	7.2% (14th)	8.0% (11th)	8.4% (10th)	9.0% (9th)
24		July 1, 2017	10.9% (5th)	11.2% (4th)	13.6% (2nd)	14.3% (2nd)
25		July 8, 2017	9.8% (9th)	10.4% (6th)	9.5% (8th)	10.4% (6th)
26		July 8, 2017	15.0% (2nd)	15.7% (3rd)	14.4% (3rd)	15.7% (3rd)
27		July 15, 2017	9.0% (12th)	10.8% (6th)	9.2% (10th)	10.2% (7th)
28		July 15, 2017	14.5% (3rd)	16.0% (3rd)	15.5% (2nd)	16.8% (2nd)
29		July 22, 2017	9.6% (8th)	10.8% (5th)	10.2% (5th)	11.5% (5th)
30		July 22, 2017	15.8% (2nd)	16.8% (2nd)	17.9% (2nd)	19.7% (2nd)
31		July 29, 2017	10.6% (8th)	11.0% (5th)	9.7% (7th)	10.9% (8th)
32		July 29, 2017	16.8% (2nd)	17.0% (2nd)	15.8% (2nd)	17.2% (2nd)
33		August 5, 2017	10.1% (5th)	10.2% (5th)	10.5% (5th)	11.2% (4th)
34		August 5, 2017	16.1% (2nd)	16.0% (2nd)	17.9% (2nd)	19.1% (2nd)
35		August 12, 2017	9.9% (6th)	10.5% (5th)	10.2% (4th)	11.1% (4th)
36		August 12, 2017	16.9% (2nd)	17.3% (2nd)	17.6% (2nd)	18.5% (2nd)
37		August 19, 2017	10.4% (5th)	11.0% (5th)	12.4% (4th)	13.3% (4th)
38		August 19, 2017	18.3% (2nd)	19.4% (2nd)	19.5% (2nd)	21.0% (2nd)
39		August 26, 2017	11.3% (4th)	12.5% (4th)	10.9% (5th)	11.9% (4th)
40		August 26, 2017	18.3% (2nd)	19.1% (2nd)	19.0% (2nd)	20.3% (2nd)
41	41	September 2, 2017	10.9% (5th)	12.1% (5th)	12.0% (5th)	13.4% (5th)
41	42	September 2, 2017	16.5% (4th)	17.6% (3rd)	17.7% (4th)	19.4% (4th)
42	43	September 2, 2017	17.2% (3rd)	18.2% (2nd)	18.4% (3rd)	19.9% (2nd)
42	44	September 2, 2017	18.3% (2nd)	18.6% (1st)	19.3% (2nd)	20.8% (1st)
43	45	September 9, 2017	8.7% (8th)	10.0% (5th)	9.7% (8th)	11.3% (6th)
43	46	September 9, 2017	16.9% (4th)	17.8% (4th)	17.7% (4th)	19.1% (4th)
44	47	September 9, 2017	18.3% (3rd)	18.8% (3rd)	19.6% (3rd)	20.9% (3rd)
44	48	September 9, 2017	19.7% (2nd)	20.0% (1st)	21.1% (2nd)	22.3% (1st)
45	49	September 16, 2017	11.8% (5th)	13.5% (5th)	12.0% (5th)	13.2% (5th)
45	50	September 16, 2017	18.8% (4th)	19.6% (4th)	19.4% (4th)	20.5% (4th)
46	51	September 16, 2017	19.8% (3rd)	19.8% (3rd)	20.5% (3rd)	20.7% (3rd)
46	52	September 16, 2017	20.2% (2nd)	20.6% (2nd)	20.9% (2nd)	22.0% (2nd)
47	53	September 23, 2017	10.7% (6th)	11.7% (5th)	10.2% (6th)	10.7% (6th)
47	54	September 23, 2017	17.8% (4th)	18.8% (4th)	18.1% (4th)	18.8% (4th)
48	55	September 23, 2017	20.4% (3rd)	21.7% (3rd)	20.4% (3rd)	21.5% (2nd)
48	56	September 23, 2017	21.0% (2nd)	22.4% (1st)	20.5% (2nd)	21.5% (2nd)
49	57	September 30, 2017	13.0% (5th)	14.5% (5th)	12.8% (5th)	13.8% (5th)
49	58	September 30, 2017	19.0% (4th)	20.1% (4th)	19.1% (4th)	20.2% (4th)
50	59	September 30, 2017	20.5% (3rd)	21.7% (2nd)	21.1% (3rd)	22.0% (3rd)
50	60	September 30, 2017	20.8% (2nd)	22.4% (1st)	21.2% (2nd)	22.5% (2nd)
51	61	October 7, 2017 (Note: Brought forward by 10 minutes due to a football friendly match involving the South Korea national football team (thus resulting in a dip in Episode 61's ratings).)	7.4% (10th)	8.8% (8th)	8.2% (11th)	9.3% (8th)
51	62	October 7, 2017	17.9% (4th)	18.5% (4th)	18.5% (4th)	20.2% (4th)
52	63	October 7, 2017	20.0% (3rd)	20.7% (2nd)	20.4% (3rd)	21.8% (3rd)
52	64	October 7, 2017	22.1% (2nd)	22.6% (1st)	22.6% (2nd)	23.8% (2nd)
53	65	October 14, 2017	12.9% (5th)	15.0% (5th)	13.6% (5th)	15.1% (5th)
53	66	October 14, 2017	20.5% (4th)	22.6% (4th)	21.3% (4th)	23.1% (4th)
54	67	October 14, 2017	23.5% (2nd)	24.4% (1st)	23.5% (3rd)	24.3% (3rd)
54	68	October 14, 2017	23.3% (3rd)	23.7% (2nd)	24.0% (2nd)	24.8% (2nd)
Average			13.4%	14.3%	18.6%	15.0%

== Original soundtrack ==
Band of Sisters

Soundtrack album by various artists
- Released: October 14, 2017
- Genre: Soundtrack
- Length: 47:09
- Language: Korean
- Labels: SBS Contents Hub; Vlending Co., Ltd.

=== Track listing ===
No.	Title	Lyrics	Music	Artist	Length
1.	"Loveholic" (러브홀릭)	JUJU	ZigZag Note	Jeon Min-ju	3:18
2.	"Because Fate Deceived Me" (운명이 날 속여서)	Shin Hyun-woo	Ddoli Park	Kim Hyun-jung	3:17
3.	"Playing with Fire" (불장난)	Ha Geun-young; Han Joon	Cho Yeong-su; Han Gil	Jang Yun-jeong	3:16
4.	"Love Tells Me" (사랑이 말해요)	Han Sung-ho	Han Seung-hoon	Byun Jin-sub	3:47
5.	"Loveholic" (Instrumental)		ZigZag Note	Jeon	3:18
6.	"Because Fate Deceived Me" (Inst.)		Ddoli Park	Kim	3:17
7.	"Playing with Fire" (Inst.)		Cho Yeong-su; Han Gil	Jang	3:16
8.	"Love Tells Me" (Inst.)		Han Seung-hoon	Byun	3:47
9.	"Band of Sisters" (언니는 살아있다)
10.	"Secret Truth"
11.	"Karma"
12.	"Into Flames"
13.	"Sadly Ever After"
14.	"A Sad Affair"
15.	"괜찮아 모두"
16.	"Hari's Theme"
17.	"My Happy Home"
18.	"짠돌이 아빠 된장 엄마"
Total length:					47:09

== Awards and nominations ==
Year	Award	Category	Recipient	Result	Ref.
2017	SBS Drama Awards	Character of the Year	Kim Da-som	Nominated	
2017	SBS Drama Awards	Top Excellence Award, Actor in a Daily/Weekend Drama	Son Chang-min	Won	
2017	SBS Drama Awards	Top Excellence Award, Actress in a Daily/Weekend Drama	Jang Seo-hee	Won	
2017	SBS Drama Awards	Excellence Award, Actor in a Daily/Weekend Drama	Ahn Nae-sang	Won	
2017	SBS Drama Awards	Excellence Award, Actress in a Daily/Weekend Drama	Son Yeo-eun	Won	
2017	SBS Drama Awards	Best New Actress	Kim Da-som	Won	
2017	SBS Drama Awards	Best New Actress	Kim Ju-hyeon	Nominated	
2017	SBS Drama Awards	Youth Acting Award	Oh Ah-rin	Nominated	
2018	54th Baeksang Arts Awards	Best New Actress	Kim Da-som	Nominated	
