= Hong In-young =

South Korean actress

- Born: October 27, 1985 (age 40); South Korea
- Education: Daejin University - Theater and Film; Chung-Ang University - Theater and Film
- Occupation: Actress
- Years active: 2005–present
- Agent: Pan Stars Company

Korean name
- Hangul: 홍인영
- RR: Hong Inyeong
- MR: Hong Inyŏng

Hong In-young (Korean: 홍인영; born October 27, 1985) is a South Korean actress. Hong represented her country at the 2005 edition of the Hong Kong–based Miss Asia Pageant, where she won Miss Photogenic and placed first runner-up. Among her prizes was a contract with pageant organizer ATV, then upon its expiration, she returned to South Korea to further her career.

== Filmography ==
=== Television series ===
Year	Title	Role
2008	Empress Cheonchu	Chun Hyang-bi
2010	Daring Women	Han Joo-ran
2011	The King of Legend	Empress Jingū
2012	Can Love Become Money?	
2012	Dream of the Emperor	Hwa-si
2014	Gap-dong	Hong Sung-hee
2014	Single-minded Dandelion	Shin Se-young/Jin Se-young

=== Music video appearances ===
Year	Song title	Artist
2001	"Mistake"	Lee Seung-hwan

== Awards and nominations ==
Year	Award	Category	Nominated work	Result
2005	Miss Asia Pageant	1st Runner-up	—N/a	Won
2005	Miss Asia Pageant	Miss Photogenic	—N/a	Won
2008	2nd Mnet 20's Choice Awards	Hot CF Star	—N/a	Won
