= Positively Yours =

2026 South Korean television series

- Promotional poster
- Hangul: 아기가 생겼어요
- Lit.: I Have a Baby
- RR: Agiga saenggyeosseoyo
- MR: Agiga saenggyŏssŏyo
- Genre: Romantic comedy
- Based on: Positively Yours by Lee Jung
- Written by: So Hae-won
- Directed by: Kim Jin-seong
- Starring: Choi Jin-hyuk; Oh Yeon-seo; Hong Jong-hyun; Kim Da-som
- Music by: Heo Sung-jin
- Country of origin: South Korea
- Original language: Korean
- No. of episodes: 12

Production
- Running time: 60 minutes
- Production companies: Take2 Media Group; Studio PIC

Original release
- Network: Channel A
- Release: January 17 – February 22, 2026

Positively Yours (Korean: 아기가 생겼어요) is a 2026 South Korean television series written by So Hae-won, directed by Kim Jin-seong and starring Choi Jin-hyuk, Oh Yeon-seo, Hong Jong-hyun, and Kim Da-som. Based on the Naver Webtoon of the same name by Lee Jung, it is about a couple who once said they'd never get married, but a one-night stand flips their lives upside down. It aired on Channel A from January 17 to February 22, 2026, every Saturday and Sunday at 22:30 (KST).

== Cast and characters ==
=== Main ===
- Choi Jin-hyuk as Kang Doo-joon

A second-gen chaebol who dedicates his life to fulfilling his deceased brother's responsibilities. He is the next heir to Taehan Group. He promised himself that he would never get married, but then he met Hee-won in a one-night stand and everything changed.

- Oh Yeon-seo as Jang Hee-won

A woman who's a total ace in her career but is totally lost when it comes to love. She, a strong woman who's closed off to marriage because of her parents' bad divorce, meets Doo-joon, who changes everything.

- Hong Jong-hyun as Lee Min-wook

Hee-won's best friend.

- Kim Da-som as Hwang Mi-ran

Hee-won's close friend and drinking partner, who's like an older sister.

=== Supporting ===
==== People around Doo-joon ====
- Kim Ki-doo as Secretary Ko

Doo-joon's friend and his assistant.

- Son Byung-ho as Kang Chan-gil

Doo-joon's father.

- Kim Sun-kyung as Han Sook-hee

Doo-joon's mother.

- Jang Yeo-bin as Kang Se-hyeon

Doo-joon's niece.

- Baek Eun-hye as Han Jeong-eum

Doo-joon's sister-in-law.

==== People around Hee-won ====
- Kim Soo-jin as Lee Seon-jeong

Hee-won's mother.

- Jung Soo-young as Team Leader Bang

Hee-won's colleague.

==== Others ====
- Kwon Hyuk-beom as Manager Na
- Shin Soo-jung as Choi Dae-ri
- Kim Tae-won as Kim Tak-soo

== Production ==
=== Development ===
The series is directed by Kim Jin-seong, written by So Hae-won, and co-produced by Take2 Media Group and Studio PIC. It is based on Naver Webtoon of the same title by Lee Jung.

=== Casting ===
On June 16, 2025, Choi Jin-hyuk and Oh Yeon-seo were reportedly considering. On June 26, according to News 1, Kim Da-som would join. In July, Yoon Ji-on joined the cast and the casting of Choi and Oh were confirmed. By September 2025, Yoon, who was filming at the time, left the drama midway through filming due to DUI arrest. As reported by Hankook Ilbo, Hong Jong-hyun was confirmed to be his replacement. The next month, Choi, Oh, Hong, and Kim were officially confirmed to star.

=== Filming ===
Principal photography began in July 2025.

== Release ==
In December 2025, a script reading was revealed, and the series was confirmed to premiere on Channel A on January 17, 2026, and will air every Saturday and Sunday at 22:30 (KST).

It is available for streaming on Rakuten Viki in selected regions.

== Viewership ==
Positively Yours : South Korea viewers per episode (thousands)

Season	Episode number											
Season	1	2	3	4	5	6	7	8	9	10	11	12
1	215	442	306	366	201	361	N/A	359	N/A	N/A	N/A	431

Source: Audience measurement performed nationwide by Nielsen Korea.

Average TV viewership ratings
Ep.	Original broadcast date	Average audience share (Nielsen Korea)	
Ep.	Original broadcast date	Nationwide	Seoul
1	January 17, 2026	1.0% (17th)	N/A
2	January 18, 2026	1.9% (6th)	1.7% (7th)
3	January 24, 2026	1.2% (16th)	1.4% (11th)
4	January 25, 2026	1.7% (11th)	1.5% (11th)
5	January 31, 2026	0.9% (19th)	0.9% (19th)
6	February 1, 2026	1.4% (17th)	1.7% (13th)
7	February 7, 2026	1.1% (23rd)	N/A
8	February 8, 2026	1.6% (15th)	1.8% (11th)
9	February 14, 2026	1.0% (27th)	N/A
10	February 15, 2026	1.4% (26th)	N/A
11	February 21, 2026	1.2% (24th)	N/A
12	February 22, 2026	1.9% (7th)	2.0% (5th)
Average		1.4%	— (Note: Due to multiple unpublished ratings, the exact average rating is unknown.)
In the table above, the blue numbers represent the lowest ratings and the red numbers represent the highest ratings.; This series aired on a cable channel/pay TV which normally has a relatively smaller audience compared to free-to-air TV/public broadcasters (KBS, SBS, MBC, and EBS).
