= SM Life Design Group =

South Korean distribution, logistics, printing, and production company

SM Life Design Group Co., Ltd.
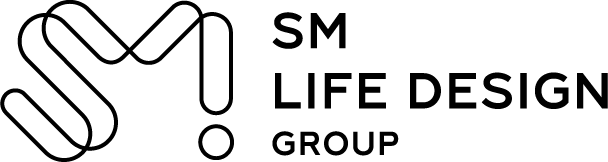
- Trade name: SM Life Design
- Native name: 에스엠라이프디자인그룹
- Formerly: KD Media (1998–2016); FNC Add Culture (2016–2018)
- Type: Public
- Traded as: KRX: 063440
- Industry: Printing; Content distribution; Production
- Founded: December 29, 1998; 27 years ago
- Headquarters: 376, Jikji-gil, Paju, South Korea
- Key people: Tak Young-jun (CEO)
- Owner: SM Entertainment (29.30%)
- Website: smlifedesign.com

SM Life Design Group (Korean: 에스엠라이프디자인그룹) is a South Korean printing, content distribution, and production company. It was originally founded in 1998 as KD Media (케이디미디어) and was acquired by FNC Entertainment, renamed to FNC Add Culture in 2016.

== History ==
=== 1998–2018: Establishment and acquisition by FNC Entertainment ===
Originally known as KD Media, it was established in December 1998 as a spin-off of the lottery business of the publishing division of Seoul Shinmun, as it was formerly a company specialized in the printing and supplying markets. In April 2000, the company launched its video business division and has grown into one of the top three major DVD publishing companies in South Korea in three years. It had also established a one-stop system such as planning, purchasing copyrights, production, and distribution in relation to DVD business. The division had its first sales in August, earning 690 million won through distribution of its first film.

On July 8, 2016 FNC acquired KD Media from NZKD One Investment Group and changed the company name to FNC Add Culture. In May 2017, the company acquired drama production company Film Boutique to strengthen its competitiveness in drama production. On January 15 2018 FNC Add Culture announced that it had acquired variety show production company Genie Pictures known to be behind many popular shows like Weekly Idol and Mr. House Husband. SM would later transfer the production company back to FNC as FNC Productions in May.

=== 2018–present: Acquisition by SM Entertainment and restructuring ===
SM Entertainment announced on the March 14, 2018 that it had acquired actor management company KeyEast and FNC Add Culture, a subsidiary of FNC Entertainment. By May 18, SM secured a 31 percent stake in FNC Add Culture and changed its name to SM Life Design Group at the same time as it completed its acquisition process, with FNC becoming the second-largest shareholder with an 18 percent stake. Ahn Seok-joon, who also served as the chief executive officer (CEO) of FNC, will support the business alliance linking FNC and SM based on his experience as a management advisor of SM Life Design Group. Through SM Life Design Group, FNC and SM have established a strategic alliance and expected to complete a "powerful" lineup by creating various business synergies in the domestic entertainment industry. In addition, FNC acquired FNC Production, an entertainment production subsidiary of SM Life Design Group, and plans to continue the partnership with the media production business and its artists to carry out the drama production business. At the end of March 2020, Shin Sung-bok, a business planning operator who previously worked for Samsung Life Insurance, Bokwang Investment, ISU Venture Capital, and M-Venture Investment, was appointed as the new CEO of SM Life Design group. In the industry, Shin is said to have reorganized SM Life Design Group's existing business divisions.

On January 10, 2022, SM Life Design announced that the company held a shareholders' meeting to appoint Tak Young-jun, a chief marketing officer (CMO) of SM Entertainment, (Note: Despite being labeled as CMO in most news articles, Tak Young-jun is considered and called the chief operating officer (COO) of SM Entertainment.) was appointed as an inside director in the company and took the position of CEO through a resolution of the board of directors. Former CEO Shin resigned as the company's inside director and CEO on the same day of the announcement. Additionally, the company appointed chief financial officer (CFO) Nam Hwa-min as its new inside director in addition to Tak. As SM Entertainment's subsidiaries have divided roles into drama content production, such as KeyEast, and food service and subsidiary businesses, such as SM Life Design Group, the company's drama business was suspended, and its incorporation with Film Boutique was sold. With its restructuring of the business sector and suspension of drama production, SM Life Design Group instead acquired a 100% stake in Beacon Holdings, Tomatillo Korea, and MOA L&B International.

== Subsidiaries ==
- MOA L&B International (2019)
- Beacon Holdings (2019)

== Production works ==
List of production works showing the year, title, and network
Year	Title	Network	Ref.
2018–2019	The Last Empress	SBS TV	
2019	Love As You Taste	Olleh TV	

== People ==
All names listed are adapted from SM Life Design Group's drama business page of its official website.

=== Director ===
- Shin Woo-chul

=== Screenwriters ===
- Kim Soon-ok (2017 to 2019)
- Baek Young-sook
- Lee Yu-jin
- Jang Hyun-joo
