= The Last Empress (TV series) =

2018 South Korean television series

- Promotional poster
- Also known as: An Empress' Dignity
- Hangul: 황후의 품격
- Hanja: 皇后의 品格
- Lit.: Empress's Dignity
- RR: Hwanghuui pumgyeok
- MR: Hwanghuŭi p'umkyŏk
- Genre: Mystery; Thriller; Action; Romance; Comedy
- Created by: Park Young-soo (SBS Drama Operations Team)
- Written by: Kim Soon-ok
- Directed by: Joo Dong-min
- Starring: Jang Na-ra; Choi Jin-hyuk; Shin Sung-rok; Lee Elijah; Shin Eun-kyung
- Country of origin: South Korea
- Original language: Korean
- No. of episodes: 52 (Note: Originally scheduled to air for 48 episodes, the series was extended by four episodes due to its popularity.) (Note: In order to circumvent Korean laws that prevent commercial breaks in the middle of an episode, what would previously have been aired as single 70 minute episodes are now being repackaged as two 35 minute episodes, with two episodes being shown each night with a commercial break between the two.)

Production
- Executive producer: Kim Young-min
- Producer: Lee Hee-soo
- Production location: South Korea
- Running time: 35 minutes
- Production company: SM Life Design Group (Note: Formerly KD Media and FNC Add Culture.)

Original release
- Network: SBS TV
- Release: November 21, 2018 – February 21, 2019

[[ thumb ]]

The Last Empress (Korean: 황후의 품격) is a 2018–2019 South Korean television series starring Jang Na-ra, Choi Jin-hyuk, Shin Sung-rok, Lee Elijah, and Shin Eun-kyung. It aired on SBS Wednesdays and Thursdays at the 22:00 KST from November 21, 2018, to February 21, 2019, for 52 episodes.

Originally slated for 48 episodes, The Last Empress was extended to 52 episodes due to its popularity. It received high viewership ratings and positive reviews for its fast-paced and unpredictable plot. On its 24th episode on December 27, 2018, The Last Empress garnered nationwide ratings of 17.9%, making it the highest rating weekday mini-series for Korean terrestrial television in 2018. It surpassed the record previously held by the drama Return.

== Synopsis ==
The Last Empress is set in an alternate universe, in which Korea is a constitutional monarchy in 2018, Oh Sunny is a bright and vivacious musical actress who marries the Emperor of the Korean Empire. She becomes involved in the palace power struggle and a mysterious murder that sets off events that threaten the monarchy itself, while searching for true love and happiness. She teams up with Na Wang Shik who works as a bodyguard for the imperial family in order to uncover the crimes of the Imperial family. Na Wang Shik started working in the palace to take revenge on the person responsible for his mother's death.

== Cast ==
=== Main ===
- Jang Na-ra as Oh Sunny – an aspiring musical actress with a bright and cheerful personality. She became an overnight Cinderella after marrying the Emperor. In the palace, she fights to uncover the truth behind the death of the Grand Empress Dowager and topple the corrupt imperial family.
- Tae Hang-ho (Ep 1–6) and Choi Jin-hyuk as Na Wang-sik / Chun Woo-bin – seeks vengeance on the Imperial family after his mother's death. To infiltrate the Imperial household, he changed his identity to Chun Woo-bin, becoming the Emperor's most trusted imperial bodyguard with unrivaled fighting skills.
- Shin Sung-rok as Emperor Lee Hyuk – Emperor of the Korean Empire. A powerful ruler who is well-respected by the people. He is talented and eloquent, but beneath his pleasant appearance lies an ugly personality.
- Lee Elijah as Min Yoo-ra – Imperial head secretary. She is quick-witted, decisive and greedy. She is trusted by the Emperor and becomes his secret lover and mistress.
- Shin Eun-kyung as Empress Dowager Kang – Lee Hyuk's mother. A fearless and powerful woman who holds absolute authority in the palace and is fiercely protective of her status.

=== Supporting ===
==== Imperial Household ====
- Oh Seung-yoon as Crown Prince Lee Yoon / Vincent Lee

Younger brother of Lee Hyuk.

- Yoon So-yi as Seo Kang-hee

Ah-ri's nanny, and birth mother.

- Oh Ah-rin as Ah-ri

Illegitimate daughter of Lee Hyuk.

- Park Won-sook as Grand Empress Dowager Jo
- Lee Hee-jin as Princess So-jin
- Shin Go-eun as Late Empress So-hyeon

First wife of Lee Hyuk.

==== Sunny's Family ====
- Yoon Da-hoon as Oh Geum-mo

Sunny's father and owner of a chicken restaurant.

- Stephanie Lee as Oh Hel-ro

Sunny's sister.

- Lee Ji-ha as Shin Eun-soo

Sunny's late mother

==== Others ====
- Kim Myung-soo as Byun Baek-ho

Father of Empress So-hyeon. Former Imperial head guard.

- Yoon Joo-man as Ma Pil-joo

Right-hand man of the Emperor.

- Hwang Young-hee as Baek Do-hee

Mother of Na Wang-sik. Adoptive mother of Min Yoo-ra and Na Dong-sik.

- Ha Do-kwon as Imperial head guard Joo
- Lee Soo-ryun as Choi Yoon-mi

Head assistant of Empress Dowager Kang

- Kim Min-ok as Hong So-mae

Head assistant of Grand Empress Dowager Jo.

- Choi Ja-hye as Ha Jeong-dan

Court lady of Grand Empress Dowager Jo.

- Oh Han-kyul as Na Dong-sik

Younger brother of Na Wang-sik.

- Kim Yoon-ji as Hyun-joo

Sunny's junior colleague and a fellow musical actress who is jealous of Sunny

- Go Se-won as Prime minister
- Yoo Gun as Kang Joo-seung
- Kim Jin-geun as Incumbent prime minister

==== Special appearances ====
- Park Chan-min as News anchor (Ep 1)
- Yoon Jong-hoon as Terrorist who tried to kill the Emperor

Kang Joo-seung's brother (Ep 1)

- Park Gyu-ri as Suicidal woman (Ep 13)
- Song Jae-hee as Father of Lee Hyuk and Lee Yoon (Ep 14 & 19)
- Jo Dong-hyuk as Detective in Grand Empress Dowager's murder (Ep 17–20)
- Park Doo-shik as Team lead Hong's son
- Son Chang-min as Goo Pil-mo, chief neurosurgeon at Daehan Imperial University Hospital (Ep 23–24)
- Kim Da-som as court lady Yang Dal-hee (Ep 28)
- Dong Hyun-bae as the detective (Ep 41–42)
- Ahn Nae-sang as Chief detective in Lee Yoon's assault (Ep 41–42)
- Jeon Soo-kyeong as Empress Eun (Ep 46–48)
- Kim Soo-mi as Sa Goon Ja/former chief Kim (Ep 47)

== Production ==
The first script reading for the drama was held on September 6, 2018, at the SBS Ilsan Production Center with the attendance of cast and crew.

Kim Jung-tae was originally cast for the role of Ma Pil-joo. He decided to resign after being diagnosed with liver cancer and was replaced by Yoon Joo-man.

On November 19, 2018, Choi Jin-hyuk suffered an injury while filming an action scene that required 30 stitches on his forehead.

While filming on December 18, 2018, Shin Sung-rok fractured his toe and underwent surgery the following day. He resumed filming activities the day after his surgery.

Due to scheduling conflict, Choi Jin-hyuk was not able to participate filming the 4-episode extension. He completed filming until episode 48 as originally planned.

On February 25, 2019, the production released an epilogue featuring Jang Na-ra and Shin Sung-rok on Naver TV and SBS NOW YouTube channel.

=== Working condition controversy ===
On October 25, 2018, SBS signed individual contracts with the staff of The Last Empress to ensure better working conditions. However, according to the Hope Alliance Labor Union (HALU), the network and the production company SM Life Design Group (SMLDG) violated the contracts when they continued to extend work schedules without consent from workers.

The HALU also alleged that, "From November 21 to 30, the staff [of The Last Empress] had to undergo ten consecutive days of intense filming schedules that lasted for many hours without a single day of rest."

On December 17, 2018, HALU filed a bill of indictment with the Ministry of Employment and Labor (MOEL) against SBS and SMLDG.

== Original soundtrack ==
The Last Empress OST

Soundtrack album by Various Artists
- Released: 2018
- Genre: Soundtrack
- Languages: Korean; English
- Labels: Vlending, SBS Contents Hub

=== Part 1 ===
Released on November 28, 2018
No.	Title	Lyrics	Music	Artist	Length
1.	"What Would It Be" (어땠을까)	Kim Ho-kyung	1601	Jang Deok Cheol	3:56
2.	"What Would It Be" (Inst.)		1601		3:56
Total length:					7:52

=== Part 2 ===
Released on December 6, 2018
No.	Title	Lyrics	Music	Artist	Length
1.	"Not Over" (끝이 아니길)	Park Sung-il	Park Sung-il	Gaho	3:30
2.	"Not Over" (Inst.)		Park Sung-il		3:30
Total length:					7:00

=== Part 3 ===
Released on December 27, 2018
No.	Title	Lyrics	Music	Artist	Length
1.	"If I Convey My Heart" (마음을 전하면)	D'DAY	KZ, Jung Su-min	Kei (Lovelyz)	4:11
2.	"If I Convey My Heart" (Inst.)		KZ, Jung Su-min		4:11
Total length:					8:22

=== Part 4 ===
Released on January 16, 2019
No.	Title	Lyrics	Music	Artist	Length
1.	"Deep Voice" (낮은 목소리)	Sebastian Anton Atas, Victor Carl Sjostrom, Red Haired Anne, SING	Sebastian Anton Atas, Victor Carl Sjostrom, Red Haired Anne, SING	Park Ji-min	3:23
2.	"Deep Voice" (Inst.)		Sebastian Anton Atas, Victor Carl Sjostrom, Red Haired Anne, SING		3:23
Total length:					6:46

=== Part 5 ===
Released on January 30, 2019
No.	Title	Lyrics	Music	Artist	Length
1.	"For Only One Day" (단 하루만)	Seo Jae-ha, Kim Young-sung	Seo Jae-ha, Kim Young-sung	Seo Ji-an	3:45
2.	"For Only One Day" (Inst.)		Seo Jae-ha, Kim Young-sung		3:45
Total length:					7:30

=== Part 6 ===
Released on February 13, 2019
No.	Title	Lyrics	Music	Artist	Length
1.	"Open Ending"	Jang Yeon-jung	OneTop	Giryeon	3:45
2.	"Open Ending" (Inst.)		OneTop		3:25
Total length:					6:50

Disc 2:
No.	Title	Artist	Length
1.	"Anger and hatred"	Various Artists	3:46
2.	"Awkward romance"	Various Artists	2:06
3.	"Confused heart"	Various Artists	1:50
4.	"Definite flaw"	Various Artists	2:22
5.	"Empress of slander"	Various Artists	1:59
6.	"Fabricated imperial family"	Various Artists	2:30
7.	"Fallen emperor"	Various Artists	2:31
8.	"Growing distrust"	Various Artists	2:11
9.	"It's all happening"	Various Artists	2:23
10.	"Imperial shadow"	Various Artists	2:15
11.	"Imperial identity"	Various Artists	1:51
12.	"Imminent crisis"	Various Artists	2:28
13.	"I am alone"	Various Artists	1:52
14.	"Min Yoo Ra"	Various Artists	1:50
15.	"My only one"	Various Artists	3:33
16.	"Man who thought he was dead"	Various Artists	1:50
17.	"Oh! Sunny day"	Various Artists	1:38
18.	"Overview of events"	Various Artists	1:47
19.	"Prelude to the truth"	Various Artists	2:44
20.	"Protect dignity! Besides !"	Various Artists	1:20
21.	"Princess Ari's Day"	Various Artists	2:10
22.	"Puzzled puzzles"	Various Artists	2:16
23.	"The Emperor is innocent"	Various Artists	2:05
24.	"The case to be revealed"	Various Artists	2:47
25.	"The past I want to die"	Various Artists	1:59
26.	"Good morning empress"	Various Artists	2:15
27.	"Throbbing Heart"	Various Artists	2:00
28.	"Thanks Oh Sunny"	Various Artists	3:11
29.	"Trigger of revenge"	Various Artists	2:46
30.	"Tearing bite fight"	Various Artists	2:46
31.	"Tears"	Various Artists	2:54
32.	"Stagnation"	Various Artists	2:43
33.	"The shadow of power"	Various Artists	2:16
34.	"The Empress dignity"	Various Artists	2:24
35.	"The ugly truth"	Various Artists	3:28
36.	"Unexpected breathing"	Various Artists	2:20
37.	"Woman with ambition, Seo Kang Hee"	Various Artists	2:39
38.	"Perfect trap"	Various Artists	1:53
39.	"Twisted self"	Various Artists	2:15

=== Viewership ===
The Last Empress : South Korea viewers per episode (millions)

Episodes	Episode number												
Episodes	1	2	3	4	5	6	7	8	9	10	11	12	13
1–13	1.251	1.372	1.331	1.485	0.928	1.365	1.181	1.521	0.945	1.492	1.334	1.821	1.299
14–26	1.961	1.766	2.319	1.712	2.234	2.047	2.715	2.115	2.750	2.754	3.180	2.327	2.953
27–39	2.414	2.877	2.162	2.747	2.279	2.780	2.267	2.858	2.151	2.691	1.912	2.527	2.517
40–52	2.985	2.676	3.054	2.398	2.880	2.115	2.664	2.275	2.737	2.065	2.578	2.669	3.282

Source: Audience measurement performed nationwide by Nielsen Media Research.

Ep.	Original broadcast date	Episode Title	Average audience share		
Ep.	Original broadcast date	Episode Title	TNmS	AGB Nielsen	
Ep.	Original broadcast date	Episode Title	Nationwide	Nationwide	Seoul
1	November 21, 2018	Thank You, Your Majesty (감사합니다 폐하)	7.4%	7.2% (14th)	7.7% (12th)
2	November 21, 2018	Thank You, Your Majesty (감사합니다 폐하)	8.1%	7.6% (11th)	8.6% (8th)
3	November 22, 2018	Always the Main Character (항상 주인공입니다)	8.0%	7.6% (13th)	8.6% (9th)
4	November 22, 2018	Always the Main Character (항상 주인공입니다)	8.5%	8.5% (9th)	9.3% (8th)
5	November 28, 2018	Can You Accept Me? (나 좀 받아줄래요?)	5.9%	5.7% (20th)	5.8% (17th)
6	November 28, 2018	Can You Accept Me? (나 좀 받아줄래요?)	7.0%	7.9% (10th)	8.4% (9th)
7	November 29, 2018	The Korean Empire's Empress (대한 제국 황후)	7.2%	7.6% (13th)	8.0% (11th)
8	November 29, 2018	The Korean Empire's Empress (대한 제국 황후)	8.2%	9.3% (7th)	9.9% (5th)
9	December 5, 2018	I'll Kill You All (내가 다 죽여버릴 거야)	6.8%	6.1% (18th)	6.8% (13th)
10	December 5, 2018	I'll Kill You All (내가 다 죽여버릴 거야)	9.2%	9.3% (7th)	10.1% (5th)
11	December 6, 2018	Don't Trust Anyone in the Palace (궁에선 아무도 믿지 마)	8.3%	7.9% (12th)	8.3% (9th)
12	December 6, 2018	Don't Trust Anyone in the Palace (궁에선 아무도 믿지 마)	10.1%	10.5% (6th)	11.5% (3rd)
13	December 12, 2018	Cheer Up, Your Majesty (힘내십시오, 마마)	6.8%	8.2% (10th)	8.6% (10th)
14	December 12, 2018	Cheer Up, Your Majesty (힘내십시오, 마마)	9.1%	11.5% (4th)	12.3% (3rd)
15	December 13, 2018	A Life that has Already Died Once (이미 한번 죽은 목숨)	9.6%	11.0% (8th)	12.4% (4th)
16	December 13, 2018	A Life that has Already Died Once (이미 한번 죽은 목숨)	12.3%	14.0% (3rd)	15.4% (2nd)
17	December 19, 2018	I Will Destroy the Imperial House (황실을 박살 낼 겁니다)	8.5%	10.0% (8th)	10.8% (6th)
18	December 19, 2018	I Will Destroy the Imperial House (황실을 박살 낼 겁니다)	11.9%	13.3% (3rd)	14.5% (2nd)
19	December 20, 2018	I Love You, Your Majesty (사랑해요 폐하)	10.9%	11.4% (6th)	12.0% (5th)
20	December 20, 2018	I Love You, Your Majesty (사랑해요 폐하)	13.3%	14.6% (2nd)	15.5% (2nd)
21	December 26, 2018	Appointing the Chief Imperial Guard (경호대장에 임명한다)	11.0%	12.6% (6th)	13.7% (4th)
22	December 26, 2018	Appointing the Chief Imperial Guard (경호대장에 임명한다)	13.1%	16.1% (2nd)	17.3% (1st)
23	December 27, 2018	Die (죽어)	13.7%	15.1% (4th)	16.2% (3rd)
24	December 27, 2018	Die (죽어)	15.8%	17.9% (2nd)	18.9% (1st)
25	January 2, 2019	Tell Me the Truth (진실을 말해주세요)	11.0%	12.5% (3rd)	12.4% (3rd)
26	January 2, 2019	Tell Me the Truth (진실을 말해주세요)	14.5%	15.8% (2nd)	16.3% (2nd)
27	January 3, 2019	Let's Play, Sunny (써니야 놀자)	13.7%	14.0% (3rd)	14.7% (3rd)
28	January 3, 2019	Let's Play, Sunny (써니야 놀자)	15.1%	16.0% (2nd)	16.9% (2nd)
29	January 9, 2019	I'll Protect It (지켜줄게요)	10.7%	11.8% (6th)	12.7% (5th)
30	January 9, 2019	I'll Protect It (지켜줄게요)	13.9%	14.9% (2nd)	15.9% (2nd)
31	January 10, 2019	I Like It (제가 좋아합니다)	11.7%	12.5% (5th)	13.5% (3rd)
32	January 10, 2019	I Like It (제가 좋아합니다)	13.7%	15.3% (2nd)	16.7% (2nd)
33	January 17, 2019	You Look Pretty (예쁘시네요)	11.1%	12.2% (5th)	12.9% (3rd)
34	January 17, 2019	You Look Pretty (예쁘시네요)	13.5%	15.2% (2nd)	16.1% (2nd)
35	January 23, 2019	You Have To Be Strong (강해지셔야 돼요)	10.5%	11.0% (7th)	11.6% (4th)
36	January 23, 2019	You Have To Be Strong (강해지셔야 돼요)	12.3%	14.0% (2nd)	15.2% (2nd)
37	January 24, 2019	Please Catch The True Criminal (진범을 잡아주세요)	9.7%	10.9% (6th)	11.0% (5th)
38	January 24, 2019	Please Catch The True Criminal (진범을 잡아주세요)	12.0%	13.9% (2nd)	14.3% (2nd)
39	January 30, 2019	I Like Her Majesty (황후 마마를 좋아합니다)	12.3%	12.9% (5th)	13.5% (3rd)
40	January 30, 2019	I Like Her Majesty (황후 마마를 좋아합니다)	14.7%	15.0% (2nd)	15.3% (2nd)
41	January 31, 2019	Do Not Run Away (도망치지마)	13.0%	14.9% (3rd)	15.5% (3rd)
42	January 31, 2019	Do Not Run Away (도망치지마)	14.8%	16.7% (2nd)	17.1% (2nd)
43	February 7, 2019 (Note: No episodes were aired on February 6 due to the Korean New Year, the film On Your Wedding Day was aired instead.)	You Murderer, Die (살인자 새끼, 죽어)	11.1%	12.2% (6th)	12.7% (4th)
44	February 7, 2019	You Murderer, Die (살인자 새끼, 죽어)	13.1%	14.5% (2nd)	15.2% (2nd)
45	February 13, 2019	Live As My Woman Until You Die (죽을 때까지 내 여자로 살아)	11.1%	11.0% (7th)	11.1% (5th)
46	February 13, 2019	Live As My Woman Until You Die (죽을 때까지 내 여자로 살아)	13.5%	13.9% (2nd)	14.1% (2nd)
47	February 14, 2019	Please Take Care of the Empire of Korea (대한 제국을 부탁합니다)	11.9%	12.4% (7th)	12.4% (5th)
48	February 14, 2019	Please Take Care of the Empire of Korea (대한 제국을 부탁합니다)	14.0%	14.6% (3rd)	14.7% (3rd)
49	February 20, 2019	The Last Day of the Imperial Family (황실의 마지막 날)	11.0%	11.7% (6th)	11.7% (4th)
50	February 20, 2019	The Last Day of the Imperial Family (황실의 마지막 날)	13.1%	13.8% (3rd)	14.2% (2nd)
51	February 21, 2019	The Last Imperial Family of the Korean Empire (대한제국 마지막 황실)	13.2%	14.1% (5th)	13.9% (4th)
52	February 21, 2019	The Last Imperial Family of the Korean Empire (대한제국 마지막 황실)	15.7%	16.5% (2nd)	16.8% (2nd)
Average			11.3%	12.2%	12.9%
Special	January 16, 2019 (Note: No new episodes were aired on January 16. A recap of the earlier episodes was aired instead.)	Special Episode (몰아보기 스페셜)	5.5%	5.8% (NR)	6.3% (16th)
Special	January 16, 2019	Special Episode (몰아보기 스페셜)	4.5%	4.9% (NR)	—N/a

== Awards and nominations ==
Year	Award	Category	Nominee	Result	Ref.
2018	SBS Drama Awards	Top Excellence Award, Actor in a Wednesday-Thursday Drama	Choi Jin-hyuk	Won	
2018	SBS Drama Awards	Top Excellence Award, Actor in a Wednesday-Thursday Drama	Shin Sung-rok	Won	
2018	SBS Drama Awards	Top Excellence Award, Actress in a Wednesday-Thursday Drama	Jang Na-ra	Won	
2018	SBS Drama Awards	Excellence Award, Actress in a Wednesday-Thursday Drama	Lee Elijah	Nominated	
2018	SBS Drama Awards	Best Young Actor/Actress	Oh Ah-rin	Nominated	
2019	Seoul International Drama Awards	Outstanding Korean Actress	Jang Na-ra	Won	

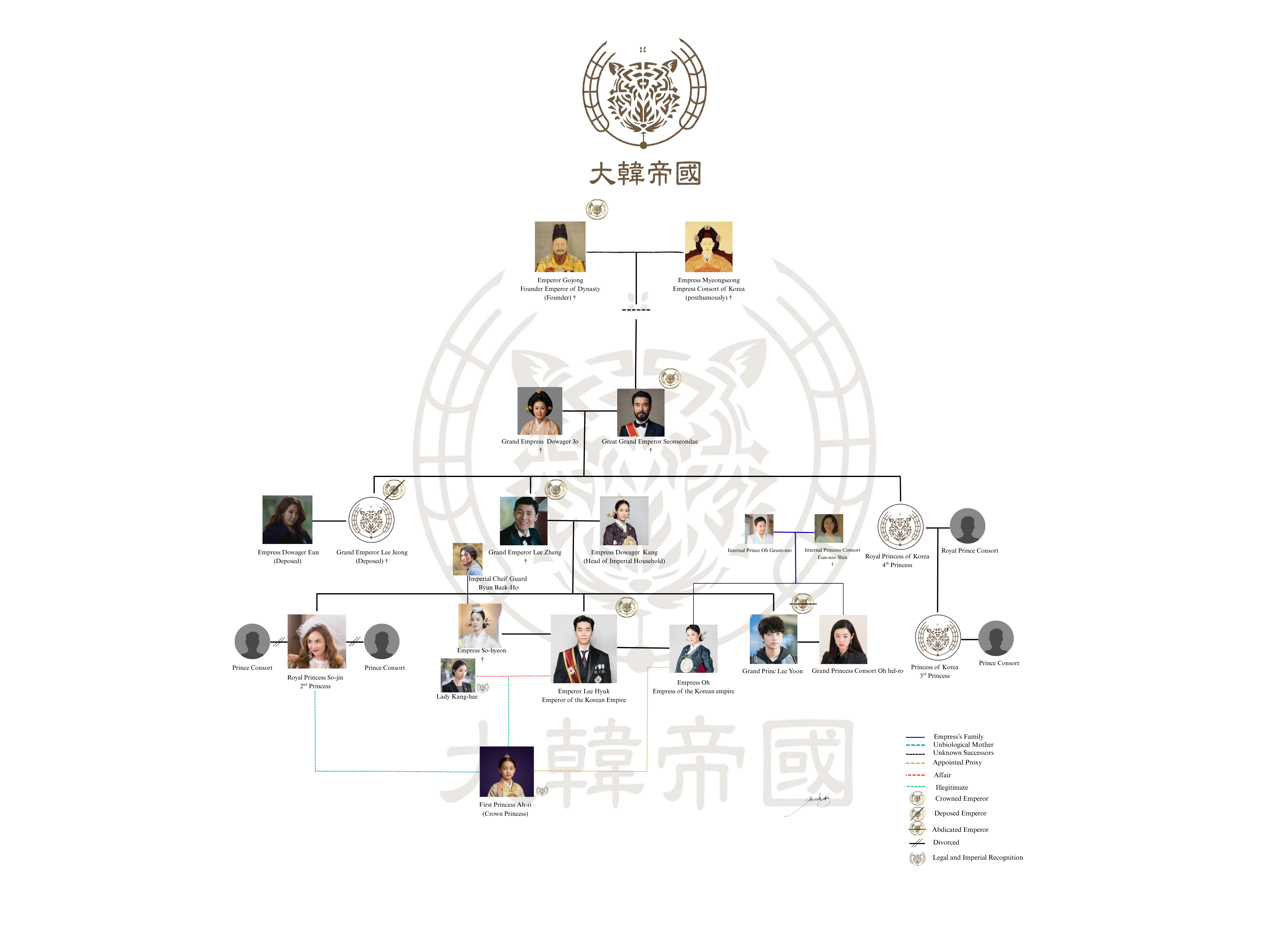
Imperial Family tree
