= Emergency Couple =

2014 South Korean television series

- Promotional poster
- Also known as: Emergency Boy and Girl
- Genre: Medical drama; Romance
- Written by: Choi Yoon-jung
- Directed by: Kim Cheol-kyu
- Starring: Song Ji-hyo; Choi Jin-hyuk; Lee Pil-mo; Choi Yeo-jin; Clara
- Composer: Kim Tae-seong
- Country of origin: South Korea
- Original language: Korean
- No. of episodes: 21

Production
- Executive producer: Lee Chan-ho
- Producer: Yoon Hyun-ki
- Production company: Content K Co. Ltd.

Original release
- Network: tvN
- Release: January 24 – April 5, 2014

Related
- Rettai Vaal Kuruvi

Emergency Couple (Korean: 응급남녀; RR: Eunggeumnamnyeo; lit. 'Emergency Man and Woman') is a 2014 South Korean television series starring Song Ji-hyo and Choi Jin-hyuk with Lee Pil-mo, Choi Yeo-jin and Clara. It aired on cable channel tvN from January 24 to April 5, 2014 on Fridays and Saturdays at 20:40 for 21 episodes. The romantic comedy/medical drama is about a divorced couple whose tumultuous feelings for each other are rekindled when they become reunited years later as interns at the same hospital.

Due to the popularity of the drama, it was extended by one episode. Broadcasting rights of the drama were also sold to 9 countries. A special music talk show titled Reply with Music - Emergency Couple was aired on May 6, 2014, to thank the audience for their support.

== Plot ==
While in their early twenties, a medical school student, Oh Chang-min, and a dietitian, Oh Jin-hee, fall in love and marry despite his family's strong opposition. Chang-min comes from a family of wealthy, successful doctors who believe Jin-hee is not good enough for him, prompting them to cut him off financially after he marries her. In order to earn money right away, Chang-min gives up his dream of becoming a doctor, and instead becomes a pharmaceutical salesman. He is miserable at his job, while Jin-hee's inferiority complex deepens as her husband's family continues to look down on her. They begin to fight constantly and eventually get a divorce. Six years later, Chang-min has gone back to med school to pursue his dream, while Jin-hee has also put herself through med school. They end up as interns at the same hospital, where they will have to work in the emergency room together for three months.

== Cast ==
=== Main characters ===
- Song Ji-hyo as Oh Jin-hee, intern
- Choi Jin-hyuk as Oh Chang-min, intern
- Lee Pil-mo as Gook Cheon-soo, attending physician of Emergency Medicine
- Choi Yeo-jin as Shim Ji-hye, assistant professor of surgery
- Clara Lee - Han Ah-reum, intern
- Yoon Jong-hoon as Im Yong-gyu, intern

=== Supporting characters ===
- Im Hyun-sung as Park Sang-hyuk, intern and Young-ae's husband
- Chun Min-hee as Lee Young-ae, intern and Sang-hyuk's wife
- Choi Beom-ho as Go Joong-hoon, chief of Emergency Medicine
- Park Sung-geun as Ahn Young-pil, surgeon
- Heo Jae-ho as Jang Dae-il, third year resident
- Kwon Min as Kim Min-ki, first year resident
- Kim Hyun-sook as Choi Mi-jung, ER head nurse
- Lee Sun-ah as Heo Young-ji, ER nurse
- Choi Yu-ra as Son Ye-seul, ER nurse
- Lee Mi-young as Jo Yang-ja, Jin-hee's mother
- Jeon Soo-jin as Oh Jin-ae, Jin-hee's younger sister
- Park Doo-shik as Kim Kwang-soo, indie singer and Jin-ae's husband
- Park Joon-geum as Yoon Sung-sook, Chang-min's mother
- Kang Shin-il as Oh Tae-seok, Chang-min's father
- Park Ji-il - as Yoon Sung-gil, Chang-min's uncle
- - as Yoon Sung-mi, Chang-min's first aunt
- - as Yoon Sung-ja, Chang-min's second aunt

=== Cameo appearances ===
- Yoon Joo-sang as priest (ep 1 and 14)
- Lee Han-wi as Dr. Jeon Hyung-seok (ep 1)
- Jeon Soo-kyeong as hospital director (ep 1)
- Yoon Bong-gil as drunk patient with gun (ep 2)
- Jung Joo-ri as Chang-min's blind date (ep 3)
- Gary as a Mr Taxi (ep 6)
- DickPunks as indie band (ep 6)
- Nam Jung-hee as female patient (ep 18-19)
- Narsha as female patient (ep 19)
- Kim Kang-hyun as male patient (ep 19)

== Ratings ==
- In this table, the blue numbers represent the lowest ratings and the red numbers represent the highest ratings.
- N/A denotes that the rating is not known.

Ep.	Original broadcast date	Average audience share	
Ep.	Original broadcast date	AGB Nielsen	
Ep.	Original broadcast date	Average rating	Peak rating
1	January 24, 2014	2.4%	3.7%
2	January 25, 2014	2.7%	3.8%
3	January 31, 2014	1.7%	—N/a
4	February 1, 2014	2.8%	3.7%
5	February 7, 2014	3.4%	4.6%
6	February 8, 2014	3.0%	4.3%
7	February 14, 2014	3.6%	5.1%
8	February 21, 2014	3.7%	4.7%
9	February 22, 2014	3.6%	4.7%
10	February 28, 2014	3.4%	4.3%
11	March 1, 2014	4.1%	4.8%
12	March 7, 2014	4.4%	5.5%
13	March 8, 2014	4.1%	5.0%
14	March 14, 2014	4.2%	5.5%
15	March 15, 2014	4.1%	4.9%
16	March 21, 2014	4.0%	5.2%
17	March 22, 2014	4.8%	5.9%
18	March 28, 2014	4.1%	5.2%
19	March 29, 2014	4.8%	5.6%
20	April 4, 2014	4.9%	5.7%
21	April 5, 2014	5.1%	5.9%
Average		3.8%	4.7%

- This drama airs on a cable channel/pay TV which normally has a relatively smaller audience compared to free-to-air TV/public broadcasters (KBS, SBS, MBC and EBS).

== Original soundtrack ==
Emergency Couple : Original Soundtrack

Soundtrack album by Various Artists
- Released: April 18, 2014
- Genres: Pop, K-pop, soundtrack
- Label: CJ E&M

No.	Title	Artist	Length
1.	"응급남녀" (Emergency Couple)	Various Artists	1:14
2.	"설렘" (Romance)	Various Artists	2:23
3.	"Love Again"	3rd Coast (써드코스트)	2:36
4.	"모두 다 이별을 경험한다" (Everyone Experiences The Breakup)	Various Artists	2:01
5.	"꽃향기" (Scent of a Flower)	Lim Jeong-hee	4:46
6.	"병원 인턴 백서" (Hospital Internship Paper)	Various Artists	2:33
7.	"진희 비트" (Jin Hee Beat)	Various Artists	3:32
8.	"그때 우리 사랑은" (The Way We Loved)	Park Shi Hwan	3:39
9.	"어루만지다" (Pacify)	Various Artists	2:41
10.	"I Am"	Joo Ah	4:46
11.	"꽃향기" (Scent of a Flower)	Choi Jin-hyuk	3:43
12.	"우리가 우리였을 때" (When We Were)	Various Artists	3:29
13.	"Love Again (Inst.)"	Various Artists	2:36
14.	"꽃향기 (inst.)" (Scent of a Flower (Inst.))	Lim Jeong-hee	4:46
15.	"그때 우리 사랑은 (Inst.)" (The Way We Loved (Inst.))	Park Shi Hwan	3:39
16.	"꽃향기 (inst.)" (Scent of a Flower (Inst.))	Choi Jin-hyuk	3:43
17.	"I Am (Inst.)"	Joo Ah	4:46
