= Ahn Seo-hyun =

South Korean actress (born 2004)

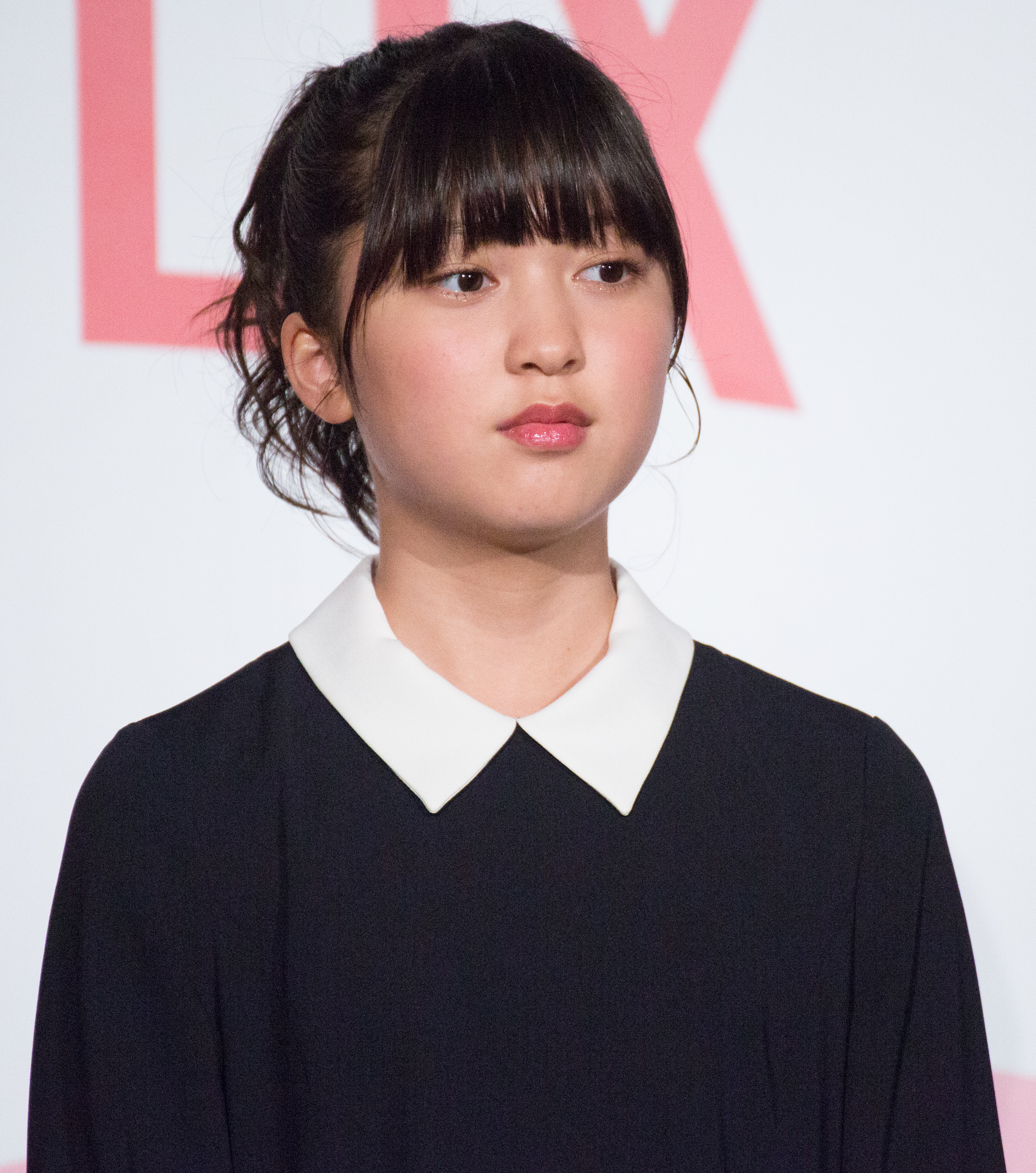
- Ahn in June 2017
- Born: January 12, 2004 (age 22); Suwon, South Korea
- Occupation: Actress
- Years active: 2008–present
- Agents: Ghost Studio; Jikim Entertainment; DSP Media

Korean name
- Hangul: 안서현
- Hanja: 安瑞賢
- RR: An Seohyeon
- MR: An Sŏhyŏn
- Website: Official website

Ahn Seo-hyun (Korean: 안서현; born January 12, 2004) is a South Korean actress. She began her career as a child actress in 2008, and has since appeared in films and television series such as The Housemaid (2010), Single-minded Dandelion (2014) and the critically acclaimed Netflix film Okja (2017), which premiered at the 2017 Cannes Film Festival in competition for the Palme d'Or.

== Filmography ==
=== Film ===
Year	Title	Role	Notes/Ref.
2009	Maybe (Rabbit and Lizard)	young May Smith	
2010	The Housemaid	Nami	
2010	Man of Vendetta	young Joo Hye-rin	
2010	The Yellow Sea	Kim Seung-hyun's daughter	
2011	Sorry, Thanks	Ahn Seo-hyun	segment: "Thank You and I'm Sorry"
2011	Champ	Little girl	
2011	Mr. Idol	Han Eun-seo	
2014	Monster	Na-ri	
2014	The Divine Move	Ryang-ryang	
2014	Welcome	young Hye-sook	
2017	Okja	Mija	Lead role, competed for Palme d'Or
2021	Dark Yellow		Short Film
2022	Oh! My Ghost	Kongi	
2025	Hana Korea	Bom-i	

=== Television series ===
Year	Title	Role	Notes
2008	Love Marriage		
2008	Terroir	young Lee Woo-joo	
2009	Can Anyone Love?	Ha-neul	
2009	Soul	young Yoon Ha-na	
2010	Three Sisters	Yoon Goo-seul	
2010	Drama Special	Sae-rom	Episode: "The Great Gye Choon-bin"
2011	Dream High	Go Hye-sung	
2011	Baby Faced Beauty	Ji Hyun-yi	
2011	Garden of Heaven	Kang Hyun-soo	
2011	What's Up	young Oh Doo-ri	
2012	Dummy Mommy	Park Dat-byul	
2013	Don't Look Back: The Legend of Orpheus	young Han Yi-hyun	
2013	Golden Rainbow	young Kim Shib-won	
2014	Drama Special	Gong Bo-mi	Episode: "Bomi's Room"
2014	Single-minded Dandelion	young Min Deul-re	
2015	The Village: Achiara's Secret	Seo Yoo-na	
2018	Sweet Revenge 2	Oh Ji-na	
2019	Haechi	Kkot-nim	

=== Variety shows ===
Year	Title	Notes	Ref.
2017	Leaving the Nest (season 2)	cast member	

=== Music video appearances ===
Year	Song title	Artist
2018	"Teenager"	Sam Kim

== Awards and nominations ==
Year	Award	Category	Nominated work	Result
2011	KBS Drama Awards	Best Young Actress	Dream High	Nominated
2014	KBS Drama Awards	Best Young Actress	Single-minded Dandelion	Won
2017	2nd Macau International Film Festival	Variety Asian Stars: Up Next Award	Okja	Won
