= Jeon Soo-jin =

South Korean actress

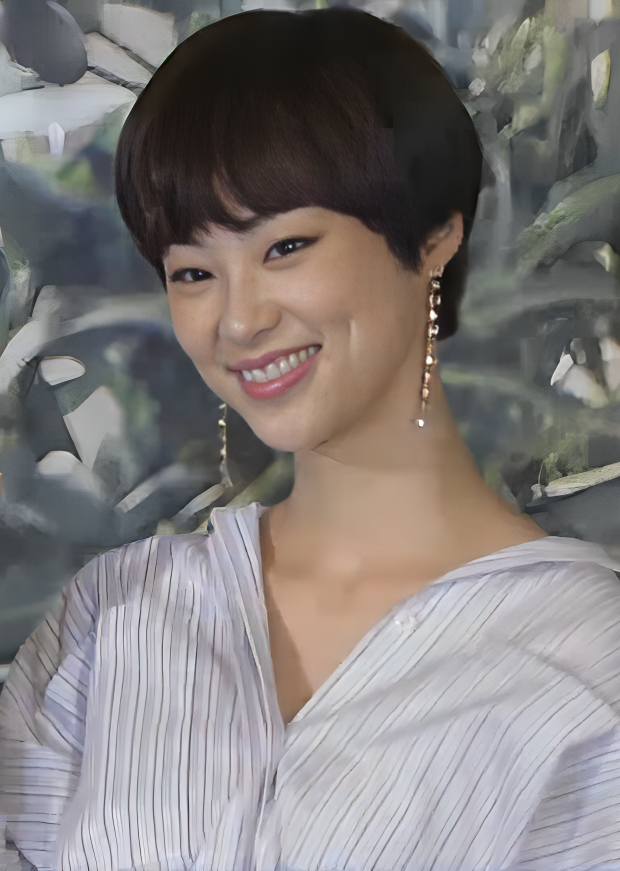
- Jeon in July 2018
- Born: November 8, 1988 (age 37); Seoul, South Korea
- Education: Konkuk University - Advertising Image Design
- Occupation: Actress
- Years active: 2008–present
- Agent: YG KPlus

Korean name
- Hangul: 전수진
- RR: Jeon Sujin
- MR: Chŏn Sujin

Jeon Soo-jin (born November 8, 1988) is a South Korean actress. Born in Seoul but raised in Jeju Island, she was studying design at Konkuk University in 2008 when she began doing part-time work as a model for the fashion magazines Shibuya and CeCi. Jeon made her acting debut in 2012 and has since starred in films and television series, notably Godsend (2014) where she played her first leading role.

== Filmography ==
=== Film ===
Year	Title	Role	Ref.
2013	My Dear Girl, Jin-young	Jamie	
2014	Hot Young Bloods	Song Yeon-hwa	
2014	Godsend	So-young	
2014	Fly High	Ye-jin	
2018	Revenger	Kaori	
2022	Oh! My Ghost	Seung-hee	

=== Television series ===
Year	Title	Role	Notes	Ref.
2012	School 2013	Kye Na-ri		
2013	KBS Drama Special	Han Gook-hwa	episode: "My Friend Is Still Alive"	
2013	The Heirs	Kang Ye-sol		
2014	Emergency Couple	Oh Jin-ae		
2014	Sweden Laundry	Hong Bo-hee	guest, episode 6	
2015	More Than a Maid	Gae-ttong		
2015	Exo Next Door	Ga-eun		
2016	Descendants of the Sun	Ri Ye-hwa		
2016	The Royal Gambler	Hwanggoo Yeomeom		
2017	Voice	Park Bok		
2017	Queen of Mystery	Kim Ho-soon		
2018	Exit	Ji Sun-young		
2018	Your House Helper	Kang Hye-joo		
2018	Tale of Fairy	Lee Ham-sook		
2022	My Liberation Notes	Lee Ye-rin		
2025	My Girlfriend is the Man	Ham Jeong Ja		

=== Variety shows ===
Year	Title	Notes	Ref.
2011	Turning Point		
2013	News Line	KBS 1TV news program; guest	

=== Music video appearances ===
Year	Song title	Artist
2012	"Beautiful"	Boom feat. Genius Tiger
2016	"Gazed at"	Baek Ji Woong
2018	"My Apology Letter"	Kim Yeon-woo

== Awards and nominations ==
Year	Award	Category	Nominated work	Result	Ref.
2014	34th Golden Cinema Festival	Best New Actress	My Dear Girl, Jin-young	Won	
