= Snatch Up =

- Film poster
- Hangul: 머니백
- Lit.: Money Bag
- RR: Meonibaek
- MR: Mŏnibaek
- Directed by: Heo Jun-hyeong
- Written by: Heo Jun-hyeong
- Produced by: Lee Jong-seok; Lee Shin-beom
- Starring: Kim Mu-yeol; Park Hee-soon; Lee Geung-young; Jun Kwang-ryul; Im Won-hee; Oh Jung-se; Kim Min-kyo
- Cinematography: Lee Chun-hee
- Edited by: Kim Sun-min
- Music by: Son Mu-hyeon
- Production company: Zen Pictures
- Distributed by: Little Big Pictures
- Release date: April 12, 2018
- Running time: 101 minutes
- Country: South Korea
- Language: Korean
- Box office: US$387,647

Snatch Up (Korean: 머니백; RR: Meonibaek; lit. 'Money Bag') is a 2018 South Korean action comedy film written and directed by Heo Jun-hyeong.

== Plot ==
The furious chase between an unemployed man, a delivery man, gangsters, a killer, and a cop all try to put their hands on a gun and a golf bag filled with cash for different purposes.

== Cast ==
- Kim Mu-yeol as Min-jae: An unemployed man who is deep in debt and is paying for the medical bills for his ailing mother at the same time. He withdraws his studio apartment deposit, but it was unfortunately snatched up by a thug.
- Park Hee-soon as Detective Choi: A corrupt detective with gambling addiction.
- Lee Geung-young as Park: A retired killer.
- Jun Kwang-ryul as Moon Sang-ryeol: A politician.
- Im Won-hee as Baek: A loan shark.
- Oh Jung-se as Parcel delivery man
- Kim Min-kyo as Thug: A gangster who works for a loan shark.
- Kim Dae-gon as Jjak Dae-gi
- Hyun Bong-shik as Drug dealer
- Jang Hyuk-jin as Poker board boss 2
- Choi Jong-nam
- Oh Ah-rin
- Kim Bo-kang
