= Jeon Soo-kyeong =

South Korean actress (born 1966)

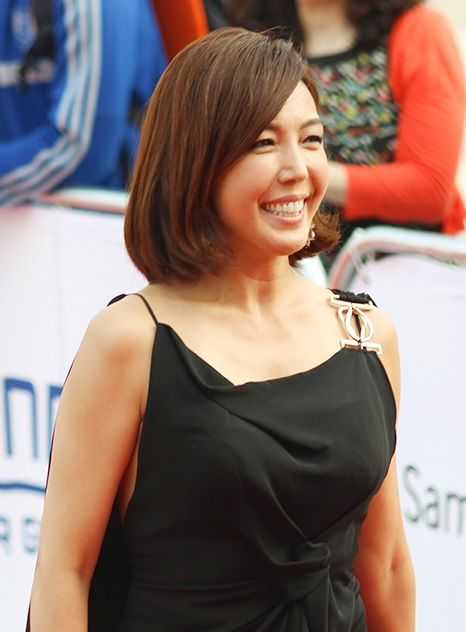
- Jeon in June 2013
- Born: July 12, 1966 (age 60); Seoul, South Korea
- Education: Hanyang University - Theater and Film
- Occupation: Actress
- Years active: 1989–present
- Agent: Will Entertainment
- Spouses: Joo Won-sung (m. 1993; div. 2008) Eric M. Swanson (m. 2014)
- Children: 2

Korean name
- Hangul: 전수경
- Hanja: 全秀卿
- RR: Jeon Sugyeong
- MR: Chŏn Sugyŏng

Jeon Soo-kyeong (Korean: 전수경; born July 12, 1966) is a South Korean actress. She is best known in musical theatre, and has starred in Korean productions of Mamma Mia!, Chicago, The Life, Guys and Dolls, Menopause, and Kiss Me, Kate.

Jeon married Eric M. Swanson, general manager of the Millennium Seoul Hilton, on September 22, 2014. She has twin daughters Joo Ji-on and Joo Si-on from her first marriage, which ended in divorce in 2008.

== Theater ==
Year	Title	Role
	Barry	
1991	The Sound of Music	
1992	A Chorus Line	
	West Side Story	
	Cats	
1993	Nunsense	
1995	Grease	
1996	42nd Street	
1998	Guys and Dolls	
1998	The Life	
1999	Gambler	
2000	The Life	Sonja
2000–2001	Rent	Joanne Jefferson
2001	Kiss Me, Kate	
2001	Tick, Tick... Boom!	Susan
2001	Chicago	Roxie Hart
2002	Rehearsal	
2003	Nunsense Jamboree	
2004	Mamma Mia!	Tanya
2004–2005	42nd Street	Maggie Jones
2005	Guys and Dolls	Adelaide
2005	Menopause	Professional Woman
2005–2006	Nunsense Jamboree	
2006	Mamma Mia!	Tanya
2006	Menopause	Professional Woman
2006	Annie	Miss Agatha Hannigan
2006	Highlights	
2007–2008	Mamma Mia!	Tanya
2007	Menopause	Professional Woman
2007	Annie	Miss Agatha Hannigan
2008	The Life	Jojo
2008	Gambler	Countess
2009	The Vagina Monologues	
2009	Go, Waikiki!	cameo
2009	Mamma Mia!	Tanya
2009–2010	Legally Blonde	Paulette
2010–2013	Mamma Mia!	Tanya
2012	Catch Me If You Can	Paula Abagnale/Carol Strong
2012	La Cage aux Folles	Madame Marie Dindon
2013	급매 행복아파트 천사호	Young-hee
2014	Chicago	Matron "Mama" Morton
2014–2015	La Cage aux Folles	Madame Marie Dindon
2015	Chicago	Matron "Mama" Morton
2022–2023	42nd Street	Meggie Jones

== Filmography ==
=== Film ===
Year	Title	Role
1989	Mouse Landing Operation	
1990	Mrs. Cabaret	Park Sun-hee
1992	Beauty and the Beast	Belle (singing voice, Korean dubbed)
1995	Millions in My Account	Sun-ah
1996	Ghost Mamma	Kang Hye-kyung
1997	Hercules	Calliope (voice, Korean dubbed)
1998	Two Cops 3	Mother of abducted child
2000	Chu Noh-Myoung Bakery	Ajumma who returns the cake (cameo)
2002	Public Enemy	Mineral water ajumma
2003	Reversal of Fortune	Je-ni
2007	The Perfect Couple	Journalist Oh
2007	Venus and Mars	Hyang-mi
2008	A Tale of Legendary Libido	Hostel owner
2009	The Relation of Face, Mind and Love	Editor
2009	Paradise	Ah-ram
2010	Jumunjin	Soon-nyeo (cameo)
2010	Finding Mr. Destiny	Soo-kyung
2010	My Black Mini Dress	Writer
2011	Mama	Hee-kyung
2012	The Scent	Chinese restaurant manager (cameo)
2012	Return of the Mafia	
2013	Jinx!!	(cameo)
2013	Marriage Blue	Dress shop owner, Yi-ra's boss
2013	Rockin' on Heaven's Door	Hospice director nun
2015	Enemies In-Law	Jo Kang-ja

=== Television series ===
Year	Title	Role	Network
2008	Chosun Police 2	Mae-hwa	MBC Dramanet
2008	Terroir	Go Ok-rim	SBS
2011	Twinkle Twinkle	Lee Eun-jung	MBC
2011	Royal Family	Carrie Kim	MBC
2011	Color of Women	Sung Ae-shim	Channel A
2012	I Do, I Do	Agency employee (cameo)	MBC
2013	Pots of Gold		MBC
2013	I Can Hear Your Voice	Dental pad lady (cameo, episode 1)	SBS
2013	Love in Her Bag	Kim Mi-yeon	JTBC
2013	Passionate Love	Joo Nam-ok	SBS
2014	Emergency Couple	Hospital director (cameo, episode 1)	tvN
2014	Into the Flames	Yang Hwa-ja	TV Chosun
2014	Glorious Day	House owner (cameo)	SBS
2014	Mama	Kwon Do-hee	MBC
2014	Drama Festival "A Resentful Woman's Diary"	Wolmae	MBC
2015	Divorce Lawyer in Love	Lee Yeon-hee (guest, episode 4)	SBS
2017	The Lady in Dignity	Director Seo	JTBC
2017	Band of Sisters	Vicky Jung	SBS
2017	Chicago Typewriter	Wang Bang-wool	tvN
2017	My Golden Life	Noh Jin-hee	KBS
2018	Welcome to Waikiki	House owner (cameo, ep. 6)	JTBC
2018	Queen of Mystery 2	Nam Bok-soon	KBS2
2018	The Rich Son	Na Young-ae	MBC
2018	The Time	Jang Ok-soon	MBC
2018	Devilish Charm	Gong Jin-yang	MBN
2018	The Last Empress	Empress Eun (cameo, ep. 46-48)	SBS
2018	My Strange Hero	Chae-min's mother	SBS
2019	Welcome to Waikiki 2	House owner (episodes 1, 2)	JTBC
2019	Melting Me Softly	Ma Dong-joo	tvN
2019–2020	Love with Flaws	Baek Jang-mi's mother	MBC
2020	She Knows Everything	Women's society president	MBC
2020	Do Do Sol Sol La La Sol	Im Ja-kyung	KBS
2021–2022	Love (ft. Marriage and Divorce)	Lee Si-eun	TV Chosun

=== Web series ===
Year	Title	Role	Ref.
2019	My First First Love	Ga-rin's mother	
2022	The Fabulous	Jang Ok-jin	

=== Variety show ===
Year	Title	Notes
2008	Singing in the Sky	Host
2012	속풀이쇼 동치미	

== Awards and nominations ==
Year	Award	Category	Nominated work	Result	Ref.
1988	11th MBC Campus Song Festival		—N/a	3rd	
1997	3rd Korea Musical Awards	Best Supporting Actress	42nd Street	Won	
1999	5th Korea Musical Awards	Best Supporting Actress	The Life	Won	
2002	8th Korea Musical Awards	Best Actress	Kiss Me, Kate	Won	
2010	44th Tax Payer's Day	성실납제자상	—N/a	Won	
2023	Scene Stealer Festival	Bonsang (Main Prize)	Love (ft. Marriage and Divorce)	Won	
