= KBS TV Novel =

1987–2018 KBS morning drama timeslot

KBS TV Novel (Korean: 한국방송공사 TV 소설; RR: Hangukbangsonggongsa TV soseol; lit. Korean Broadcasting System TV Story) is a TV series that was broadcast on KBS 2TV at 09:00 (KST) during weekdays, developed and produced by the KBS Drama Production group. It was broadcast on KBS 1TV until 2009. The production and broadcasting were temporarily halted due to the production cost issue, however, the TV Novel series was back on KBS 2TV in November 2011 after being reorganized.

On August 13, 2018, KBS announced that the TV Novel series would end after 22 years of broadcast, due to declining audience ratings and increased production costs.

== Broadcast ==
Broadcasting channel	Broadcasting period	Airtime	Broadcasting duration
KBS 1TV	March 2, 1987 – October 18, 1987	Monday to Friday from 07:25 to 08:10 (KST)	45 minutes
KBS 1TV	March 4, 1996 – October 12, 1996	Monday to Saturday from 08:20 to 08:40 (KST)	20 minutes
KBS 1TV	October 14, 1996 – October 16, 1999	Monday to Saturday from 08:10 to 08:30 (KST)	20 minutes
KBS 1TV	October 18, 1999 – April 28, 2007	Monday to Saturday from 08:05 to 08:30 (KST)	25 minutes
KBS 1TV	April 30, 2007 – April 17, 2009	Monday to Friday from 07:50 to 08:25 (KST)	35 minutes
KBS 2TV	May 1, 1995 – March 2, 1996	Monday to Saturday 08:40 to 09:00 (KST)	20 minutes
KBS 2TV	November 7, 2011 – August 31, 2018	Monday to Friday from 09:00 to 09:40 (KST)	40 minutes

== List of works ==
#	Year	Title	Original title	Broadcast period	Episodes	Notes	Average ratings	Lead actors
1	1987	Love	사랑	March 2, 1987 – April 3, 1987		Started airing on KBS 1TV		
2	1987	Hill Flower	산유화	April 6, 1987 – May 15, 1987				
3	1987	Pure Love	순애보	May 18, 1987 – June 24, 1987				
4	1987	Forever Smile	영원한 미소	July 1, 1987 – August 5, 1987				
5	1987	Pearl Tower	진주탑	August 10, 1987 – October 18, 1987				
6	1995	The Road	길	May 1, 1995 – October 14, 1995		Series moved to KBS 2TV		Jung Ae-ri, Sunwoo Eun-sook, Yoo Hye-ri
7	1995	Rapid	여울	October 16, 1995 – March 2, 1996				Yoo Ji-in, Lee Dong-joon
8	1996	Milky Way	은하수	March 4, 1996 – August 29, 1996		Series moved to KBS 1TV		Yoo Ho-jeong, Kim Myung-soo, Park Sang-ah
9	1996	White Dandelion	하얀 민들레	September 2, 1996 – March 1, 1997				Park Sun-young, Im Dong-jin
10	1997	Splendor in The Grass	초원의 빛	March 3, 1997 – November 1, 1997				Yoo Ho-jeong, Cha Kwang-soo
11	1997	The River of Maternal Love	모정의 강	November 3, 1997 – May 2, 1998				Park Ji-young, Kim Hye-sun, Lee Chang-hoon, Huh Joon-ho
12	1998	A Song For You and Me	너와 나의 노래	May 4, 1998 – September 18, 1998				Yum Jung-ah, Eum Jeong-hee, Lee Chang-hoon, Kim Myung-soo
13	1998	Eun-ah's Garden	은아의 뜰	September 20, 1998 – April 3, 1999				Jang So-hye, Kil Yong-woo, Sunwoo Jae-duk
14	1999	You	당신	April 5, 1999 – September 25, 1999	132			Kim Hye-sun, Dokgo Young-jae
15	1999	Sister's Mirror	누나의 거울	September 27, 1999 – April 15, 2000				Hong Ri-na, Jeong Jae-gon, Kim Myung-soo
16	2000	Dandelion	민들레	April 17, 2000 – October 21, 2000				Jung Dong-hwan, Kim Young-ae, Kim Ho-jin
17	2000	Promise	약속	October 23, 2000 – April 21, 2001	156			Seol Soo-jin, Jeong Jae-gon, Jeon Hyeon
18	2001	Flower Story	매화연가	April 23, 2001 – November 3, 2001	167			Im Ji-eun, Lee Joo-hyun, Hwang Eun-ha
19	2001	Stepmother	새엄마	November 5, 2001 – August 3, 2002	233			Lee Hye-sook, Kim Kap-soo
20	2002	Album of Life	인생화보	August 5, 2002 – April 19, 2003	219			Kim Ji-yeon, Kim Jung-nan, Lee Se-chang, Song Il-kook
21	2003	Buni	분이	April 21, 2003 – November 15, 2003	178			Go Jeong-min, Kim Hong-pyo, Lee Ja-young, Lee Hyeong-cheol
22	2003	Briar Flower	찔레꽃	November 17, 2003 – June 12, 2004	180			Jeon Mi-seon, Ahn Yeon-hong, Nam Seong-jin
23	2004	You are a Star	그대는 별	June 14, 2004 – January 29, 2005	196			Han Hye-jin, Kim Seung-soo, Im Ji-hyeon, Kim Jeong-hak
24	2005	Wind Flower	바람꽃	January 31, 2005 – August 27, 2005	179		16.6%	Hong Eun-hee, Kim Sung-eun, Im Ho, Lee Hyeong-cheol
25	2005	Hometown Station	고향역	August 29, 2005 – March 18, 2006	174		13.7%	Jeon Ik-ryeong, Park Joon-hyeok, Oh Yoo-na, Kim Cheol-gi
26	2006	As the River Flows	강이 되어 만나리	March 20, 2006 – November 4, 2006	198		12.1%	Kim Yoon-kyeong, Kim Hyeok, Lee Pil-mo
27	2006	Sunok	순옥이	November 6, 2006 – April 28, 2007	150		11.8%	Choi Ja-hye, Hwang Dong-joo, Do-han, Park Hye-young, Choi Eun-joo
28	2007	Landscape in My Heart	그대의 풍경	April 30, 2007 – November 9, 2007	138		11.7%	Heo Young-ran, Kim Cheol-gi, Bang Moon-soo, Im Ye-won
29	2007	Beautiful Days	아름다운 시절	November 12, 2007 – June 6, 2008	149		12.3%	Park Grina, Jeon Ik-ryeong, Choi Gyu-hwan, Choi Jin-hyuk
30	2008	Big Sister	큰 언니	June 9, 2008 – January 2, 2009	150		13.0%	Jeon Hye-jin, Oh Seung-eun, Choi Cheol-ho, Kim Il-woo
31	2009	Glory of Youth	청춘예찬	January 5, 2009 – April 17, 2009	75	Series halted	10.7%	Yoo Da-in, Moon Bo-ryung, Lee In
32	2011	Dear My Sister	복희 누나	November 7, 2011 – May 4, 2012	130	Series moved to KBS 2TV	12.5%	Jang Mi-inae, Ryu Tae-joon, Kim Yoo-ri, Choi Chang-yeob
33	2012	Love, My Love	사랑아 사랑아	May 7, 2012 – January 4, 2013	175		12.4%	Hwang Sun-hee, Song Chae-yoon, Oh Chang-seok, Kim San-ho
34	2013	Samsaengi	삼생이	January 7, 2013 – June 21, 2013	120		14.5%	Hong Ah-reum, Son Seong-yoon, Cha Do-jin, Ji Il-joo
35	2013	Eunhui	은희	June 24, 2013 – January 3, 2014	140		11.0%	Kyung Soo-jin, Lee In, Choi Yoon-so, Jung Min-jin
36	2014	Land of Gold	순금의 땅	January 6, 2014 – August 22, 2014	163		11.6%	Kang Ye-sol, Kang Eun-tak, Baek Seung-hee, Lee Byung-hoon
37	2014	Single-minded Dandelion	일편단심 민들레	August 25, 2014 – February 27, 2015	134		9.9%	Kim Ga-eun, Hong In-young, Yoon Sun-woo, Jeon Seung-bin
38	2015	In Still Green Days	그래도 푸르른 날에	March 2, 2015 – August 28, 2015	129		10.3%	Song Ha-yoon, Lee Hae-woo, Jung Yi-yeon, Kim Min-soo
39	2015	The Stars Are Shining	별이 되어 빛나리	August 31, 2015 – February 26, 2016	128		11.0%	Go Won-hee, Lee Ha-yool, Seo Yoon-na, Cha Do-jin
40	2016	My Mind's Flower Rain	내 마음의 꽃비	February 29, 2016 – September 6, 2016	128		10.2%	Na Hae-ryung, Ji Eun-sung, Jung Yi-yeon, Lee Chang-wook
41	2016	That Sun in the Sky	저 하늘에 태양이	September 7, 2016 – February 24, 2017	121		9.3%	Yoon A-jung, Lee Min-woo, Noh Young-hak, Kim Hye-ji
42	2017	A Sea of Her Own	그 여자의 바다	February 27, 2017 – August 11, 2017	120		8.3%	Oh Seung-ah, Choi Sung-jae, Kim Joo-young, Han Yoo-yi
43	2017	Dal Soon's Spring	꽃 피어라 달순아!	August 14, 2017 – February 9, 2018	129		8.1%	Hong Ah-reum, Yun Da-yeong, Song Won-seok, Kang Da-bin
44	2018	Through the Waves	파도야 파도야	February 12, 2018 – August 31, 2018	143	Slot discontinued	7.4%	Ah Young, Jang Jae-ho, Jeong-heon, Park Jung-wook, Jay Kim

== See also ==
- Television in South Korea
- Korean drama
- Asadora (a/k/a Renzoku Terebi Shōsetsu), drama series of similar format produced by NHK in Japan
