= The Other Side of the Moon =

The Other Side of the Moon may refer to:

- The Other Side of the Moon (album), an album of rarities and B-sides by The Cardigans
- The Other Side of the Moon (anthology), an anthology of science fiction stories edited by August Derleth
- The Other Side of the Moon (EP), an extended play by South Korean girl group GWSN

== See also ==
- Dark side of the Moon (disambiguation)
