= Kim Ye-ryeong =

South Korean actress (born 1966)

- Born: Kim Yoon-mi; March 4, 1966 (age 60); Seoul, South Korea
- Education: Dankook University - International Trade
- Occupation: Actress
- Years active: 1993–present
- Spouse: Park Young-hoon (m. 1997)

Korean name
- Hangul: 김예령
- RR: Gim Yeryeong
- MR: Kim Yeryŏng

Birth name
- Hangul: 김윤미
- RR: Gim Yunmi
- MR: Kim Yunmi

Kim Ye-ryeong (Korean: 김예령; born March 4, 1966), birth name Kim Yoon-mi, is a South Korean actress.

== Filmography ==
=== Television series ===
Year	Title	Role
1998	White Nights 3.98	Choi Sang-gyu's wife
1999	The Clinic for Married Couples: Love and War	
2001	KBS TV Novel: "Hongeo (Fermented Skate)"	Woman
2003	Snowman	Cha Sung-joon's stepmother
2003	Sang Doo! Let's Go to School	Soo-hee
2004	Dal-rae's House	Madam Kim
2004	Forbidden Love	Kang Joo-sun
2005	Rebirth - Next	Eun-young/Miss Oh/Nun/Mrs. Go
2006	Alien Sam	
2006	Mr. Goodbye	
2006	Korea Secret Agency	Bar hostess
2006	My Love Dal-ja	Yoon Mi-jin
2007	How to Meet a Perfect Neighbor	Dan Myung-hee
2007	Kimcheed Radish Cubes	
2008	Life Special Investigation Team	Sebastian's owner (guest, episode 6)
2008	Family's Honor	Young-hee
2008	Star's Lover	Lee Ji-soon
2009	Ugly Miss Young-ae 5	Kim Ye-ryung
2010	Definitely Neighbors	Jang Se-hee
2010	Pure Pumpkin Flower	Kim Myung-ja
2010	The President	Yoo Jung-hye
2011	Vampire Prosecutor	Park Hyun-joo's mother (guest, episode 5)
2012	Moon Embracing the Sun	Lady Park
2012	Late Blossom	Lee Yoon-hee
2012	KBS TV Novel: "Love, My Love"	Kim Yang-ja
2012	Lovers of Haeundae	
2012	Dream of the Emperor	Madam Manmyeong
2012	Full House Take 2	Lee Tae-ik's mother
2013	Monstar	Yoon Seol-chan's mother (guest)
2013	Princess Aurora	Jang Purme
2013	KBS Drama Special: "My Friend Is Still Alive"	Kyung-sook's mother
2013	Empress Ki	Lady Lee (cameo)
2013	Melody of Love	Goo Mi-ok
2014	Cunning Single Lady	Lee Eun-hwa
2014	Gunman in Joseon	Lady Kim
2014	Single-minded Dandelion	Hwang Geum-shil
2015	My Mom	Park Hyun-sook
2016	KBS Drama Special: "Pinocchio's Nose"	Kim Young-hee
2017	Introverted Boss	Park Ae-ran
2017	Revolutionary Love	Byun Geum-hee
2018	Radio Romance	Jo Ae-ran
2018	The Beauty Inside	Ryu Eun-ho's Mother
2018	Love Alert	Na Hwa-jung
2019	Home for Summer	Byeon Myeong-ja
2022	It's Beautiful Now	Yoo Hye-yeong
2023	Woman in a Veil	Cha Young-ran

=== Film ===
Year	Title	Role
1992	A Foolish Lover	Sun-hee
1992	The Moon Is... the Sun's Dream	Coordinator
1992	The Foolish Ghost	Mo-ran
1994	Absolute Love	
1995	Who Drives Me Crazy	Min Ji-hyun
1996	The River Flows to Tomorrow	Myung-hee
1997	Sky Doctor	Eun-sook
1998	Seong-cheol	
1998	Turtleneck Sweater (short film)	Woman
2002	L'abri: Bus Stop	Hye-kyung
2003	A Little Monk	Widow
2005	Long and Winding Road	Daughter-in-law
2005	The Intimate	Wine shop owner
2006	Gangster High	Chang-bae's mother
2007	Before the Summer Passes Away	Older sister So-yeon (cameo)
2007	Bravo My Life	Jo Sook-hee
2009	Fly, Penguin	Chairman Kwon's wife
2009	Mom's Vacation (short film)	
2010	Wedding Dress	Yeo-woon
2021	Clone Girl (Short film)	Hae-woo
TBA	Jochiwon Hae-mun	Mi-sook

=== Variety shows ===
Year	Title	Network	Notes/Ref.
2021	Falling for Korea - Transnational Couples	MBN	Judge

== Theater ==
Year	Title	Role
2010	Some Girl(s)	Jung-hee
2013	The Seagull	Irina Nikolayevna Arkadina
2021	A Streetcar Named Desire	Blanche

== Awards and nominations ==
Year	Award	Category	Nominated work	Result
2012	KBS Drama Awards	Excellence Award, Actress in a Daily Drama	TV Novel: Love, My Love	Won
