= Melody of Love (TV series) =

- Promotional poster
- Also known as: Love Through Song
- Genre: Romance, drama
- Written by: Hong Young-hee
- Directed by: Lee Duk-gun
- Starring: Kim Da-som; Baek Sung-hyun; Hwang Sun-hee; Kim Hyung-jun; Kwak Hee-sung
- Country of origin: South Korea
- Original language: Korean
- No. of episodes: 151

Production
- Executive producer: Kwak Ki-won

Original release
- Network: KBS1
- Release: 4 November 2013 – 6 June 2014

Melody of Love (Korean: 사랑은 노래를 타고; RR: Sarangeun noraereul tago; lit. Love Rides the Song) is a 2013 South Korean daily drama television series starring Kim Da-som, Baek Sung-hyun, Hwang Sun-hee, Kim Hyung-jun and Kwak Hee-sung. It aired on KBS1 from November 4, 2013 to June 6, 2014 on Mondays to Fridays at 20:20 for 151 episodes.

== Plot ==
This drama centers on three families whose members learn to appreciate each other, realize the true meaning of family, regret their misbehavior, and repent the hurt they've caused after hardships and trials in a world where individualism is prominent.

Gong Deul-im (Kim Da-som) is a tenacious, outgoing, and optimistic aspiring musical actress with the undying passion to pursue her dreams despite going against her parents' wishes. She will have a romantic relationship with lawyer Park Hyun-woo (Baek Sung-hyun). Meanwhile, Han Tae-kyung (Kim Hyung-jun) is the leader of a drama troupe and musical director. He is a perfectionist, but a gentle and thoughtful man outside of work. He is best friends with Hyun-woo and Deul-im's older sister, Gong Soo-im (Hwang Sun-hee). Later, he will work closely with Deul-im, and develop feelings for Soo-im.

== Cast ==
=== Main characters ===
- Kim Da-som as Gong Deul-im
- Baek Sung-hyun as Park Hyun-woo
- Hwang Sun-hee as Gong Soo-im, Deul-im's older sister and Tae-kyung's wife.
- Kim Hyung-jun as Han Tae-kyung, Soo-im's Husband.
- Kwak Hee-sung as Yoon Sang-hyun

=== Supporting characters ===
Hyun-woo's family

- Sunwoo Jae-duk as Park Beom-jin
- Kim Hye-sun as Yoon Ji-young
- Park Woong as Park Doo-shik

Soo-im and Deul-im's family

- Lee Jung-gil as Gong Jung-nam
- Kim Hye-ok as Yoo Jin-soon
- Ban Hyo-jung as Jo Gwi-boon
- Jung Shi-ah as Gong Jung-ja
- Kim Ji-hoon as Kim Sung-hoon
- Shin Bi as Noh Jin-yi

Tae-kyung's family

- Jung Seung-ho as Han Joo-ho
- Kim Ye-ryeong as Goo Mi-ok
- Lee Joo-hyun as Goo Se-joon
- Jung Da-bin as Han Tae-hee
- Jo Soo-min as Lee Ja-hye

Eun Ha Soo Theatrical Troupe

- Han Min-chae as Geum Na-ri
- Lee Eun-ha as Go Eun-ha
- Kim Tae-hyung as Go Min
- Jung Yi-yeon as Yeo In-sook
- Heo Bo-bae as Bo-bae
- Kim Hyun-min as Hyun

== Ratings ==
| Episode # | Original broadcast date | Average audience share | | | |
| Episode # | Original broadcast date | TNmS Ratings | | AGB Nielsen | |
| Episode # | Original broadcast date | Nationwide | Seoul National Capital Area | Nationwide | Seoul National Capital Area |
|---|---|---|---|---|---|
| 1 | 2011/12/25 | 24.1% | 22.2% | 23.5% | 23.7% |
| 2 | 2011/12/26 | 24.5% | 22.0% | 22.9% | 22.6% |
| 3 | 2011/12/27 | 21.5% | 18.3% | 21.3% | 21.3% |
| 4 | 2011/12/28 | 22.7% | 21.1% | 21.3% | 22.0% |
| 5 | 2011/12/29 | 21.1% | 18.8% | 20.2% | 19.7% |
| 6 | 2011/12/30 | 23.3% | 20.4% | 23.8% | 23.1% |
| 7 | 2011/12/31 | 25.0% | 21.8% | 24.0% | 23.0% |
| 8 | 2012/01/01 | 22.4% | 19.3% | 21.9% | 21.3% |
| 9 | 2012/01/02 | 23.0% | 19.6% | 23.8% | 22.3% |
| 10 | 2012/01/03 | 21.4% | 17.6% | 18.2% | 17.0% |
| 11 | 2012/01/04 | 24.2% | 22.5% | 23.7% | 23.2% |
| 12 | 2012/01/05 | 25.0% | 22.1% | 23.9% | 22.5% |
| 13 | 2012/01/06 | 23.8% | 20.6% | 22.5% | 21.7% |
| 14 | 2012/01/07 | 25.7% | 23.6% | 24.1% | 23.2% |
| 15 | 2012/01/08 | 23.3% | 19.8% | 21.2% | 19.3% |
| 16 | 2012/01/09 | 25.8% | 21.8% | 25.5% | 25.5% |
| 17 | 2012/01/10 | 24.2% | 21.7% | 24.3% | 23.1% |
| 18 | 2012/01/11 | 23.7% | 20.9% | 24.4% | 23.4% |
| 19 | 2012/01/12 | 25.6% | 21.9% | 25.8% | 24.9% |
| 20 | 2012/01/13 | 26.0% | 23.5% | 23.5% | 23.8% |
| 21 | 2012/01/14 | 26.8% | 23.9% | 25.3% | 25.2% |
| 22 | 2012/01/15 | 25.6% | 22.4% | 25.9% | 25.1% |
| 23 | 2012/01/16 | 25.9% | 24.3% | 24.9% | 24.5% |
| 24 | 2012/01/17 | 28.3% | 25.6% | 25.1% | 24.1% |
| 25 | 2012/01/18 | 25.3% | 22.5% | 23.5% | 22.7% |
| 26 | 2012/01/19 | 27.3% | 25.5% | 26.2% | 24.9% |
| 27 | 2012/01/20 | 24.9% | 22.7% | 25.4% | 24.6% |
| 28 | 2012/01/21 | 25.8% | 24.4% | 25.0% | 24.2% |
| 29 | 2012/01/22 | 26.1% | 23.5% | 26.0% | 25.1% |
| 30 | 2012/01/23 | 24.1% | 21.2% | 24.7% | 23.6% |
| 31 | 2012/01/24 | 27.2% | 24.8% | 26.8% | 25.7% |
| 32 | 2012/01/25 | 26.5% | 24.6% | 26% | 24.8% |
| 33 | 2012/01/26 | 25.9% | 23.3% | 25.3% | 24.9% |
| 34 | 2012/01/27 | 26.7% | 25.1% | 25.6% | 24.7% |
| 35 | 2012/01/28 | % | % | % | % |

== Awards and nominations ==
| Year | Award | Category | Recipient | Result |
|---|---|---|---|---|
| 2013 | 21st Korean Culture and Entertainment Awards | Excellence Award, Actress (TV) | Kim Hye-sun | Won |
| 2013 | KBS Drama Awards | Best New Actor | Baek Sung-hyun | Nominated |
| 2013 | KBS Drama Awards | Best New Actress | Kim Da-som | Nominated |
| 2013 | KBS Drama Awards | Netizen's Choice, Actor | Baek Sung-hyun | Nominated |
| 2013 | KBS Drama Awards | Netizen's Choice, Actor | Kim Hyung-jun | Nominated |
| 2013 | KBS Drama Awards | Netizen's Choice, Actress | Kim Da-som | Nominated |
| 2013 | KBS Drama Awards | Best Couple Award | Baek Sung-hyun and Kim Da-som | Nominated |
| 2014 | 7th Korea Drama Awards | Best New Actress | Kim Da-som | Nominated |
| 2014 | 3rd APAN Star Awards | Best New Actress | Kim Da-som | Nominated |
