= Kim Da-som =

South Korean actress (born 1993)

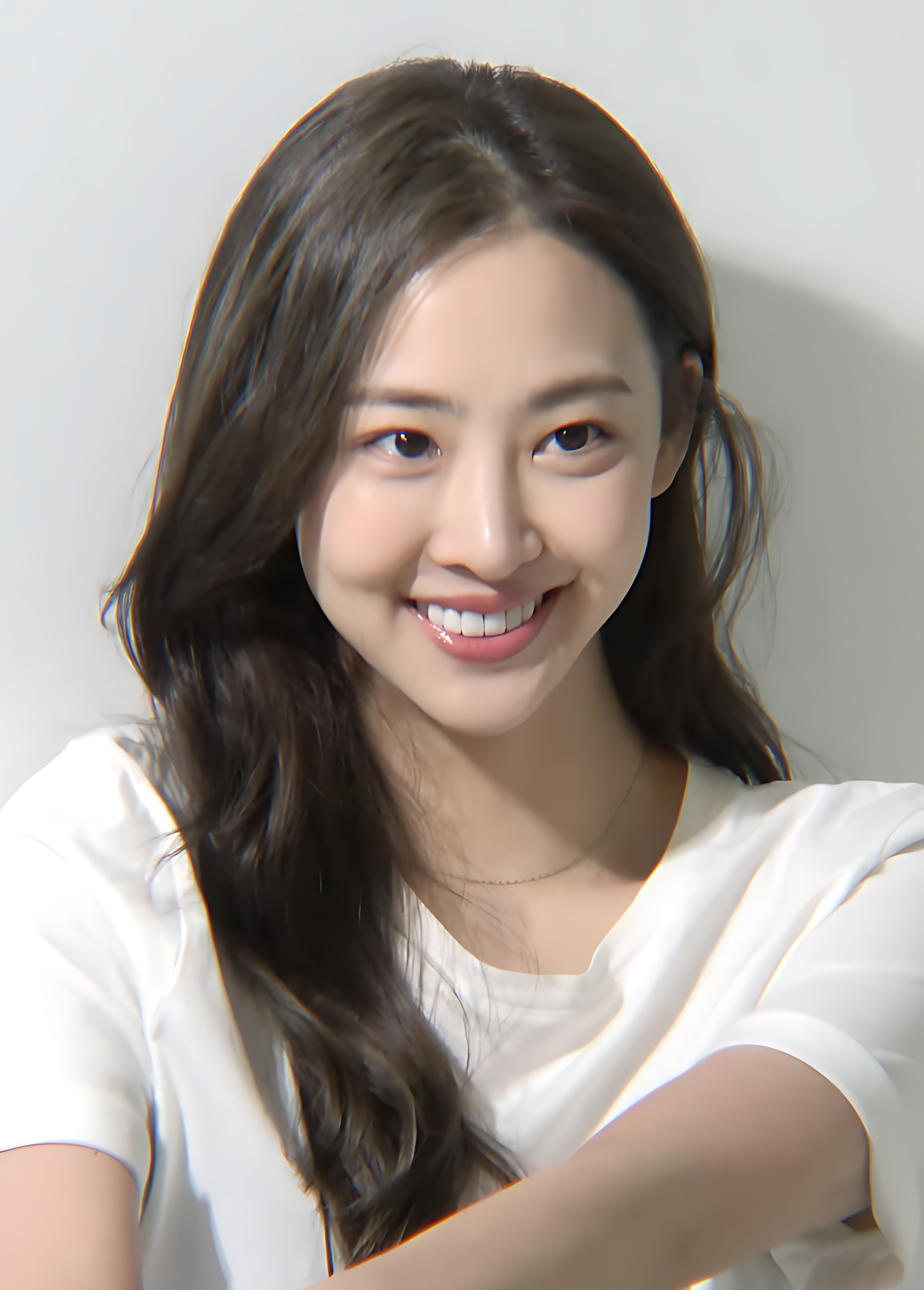
- Kim in 2021
- Born: May 6, 1993 (age 33); South Korea
- Education: Konkuk University (Department of Film)
- Occupations: Actress; singer
- Years active: 2010–present
- Agent: Story J Company
- Musical career
- Genre: K-pop
- Instrument: Vocals
- Years active: 2010–2017
- Label: Starship
- Formerly of: Sistar

Korean name
- Hangul: 김다솜
- RR: Gim Dasom
- MR: Kim Tasom

Signature
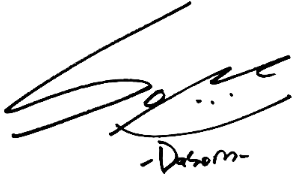

Kim Da-som (Korean: 김다솜; born May 6, 1993), known mononymously as Dasom, is a South Korean actress and singer. She is best known as a former member of South Korean girl group Sistar and formerly under Starship Entertainment. She has acted in films and television dramas, including Family (2012–2013), Melody of Love (2013–2014), The Virtual Bride (2015), Sister is Alive (2017) and He Is Psychometric (2019).

== Career ==
=== Pre-debut activities ===
Before debuting as a singer, Dasom had entered and won various poem and song-writing contests. Since childhood, Dasom had dreamed of becoming an actress. She shared that she grew up watching classic movies and, during her second year of middle school, would watch two films a day during her vacations. She was particularly captivated by the works of directors like Hitchcock, Kubrick, and Luc Besson.

Dasom naturally thought that she wanted to act. This led her to enroll in the acting department at Anyang Arts High School while misleading her parents about attending an English academy. During that time, she was approached by a scout to debut in their company; however, her parents recommended that she audition for a bigger agency. She was then taken in by her brother and auditioned at JYP Entertainment, where she eventually passed and started her training career. Later on, she moved to Cube Entertainment but, by chance, auditioned at Starship Entertainment as an actress but was eventually offered a spot in Sistar. She mentioned that she regretted missing a lot of her school days due to debuting while still in high school, but she also felt fulfilled for having achieved her dream.

=== 2010–present: Debut with Sistar and acting career ===
In June 2010, Kim made her debut as a member of Sistar on KBS Music Bank with their debut single, "Push Push".

In July 2012, Kim made her acting debut in KBS' daily sitcom Family, playing a high school punk. She also appeared in the music video for boy band VIXX's song "Rock Ur Body," released on August 13, 2012, and in K.Will's music video for the song "Please Don't," released on October 10, 2012.

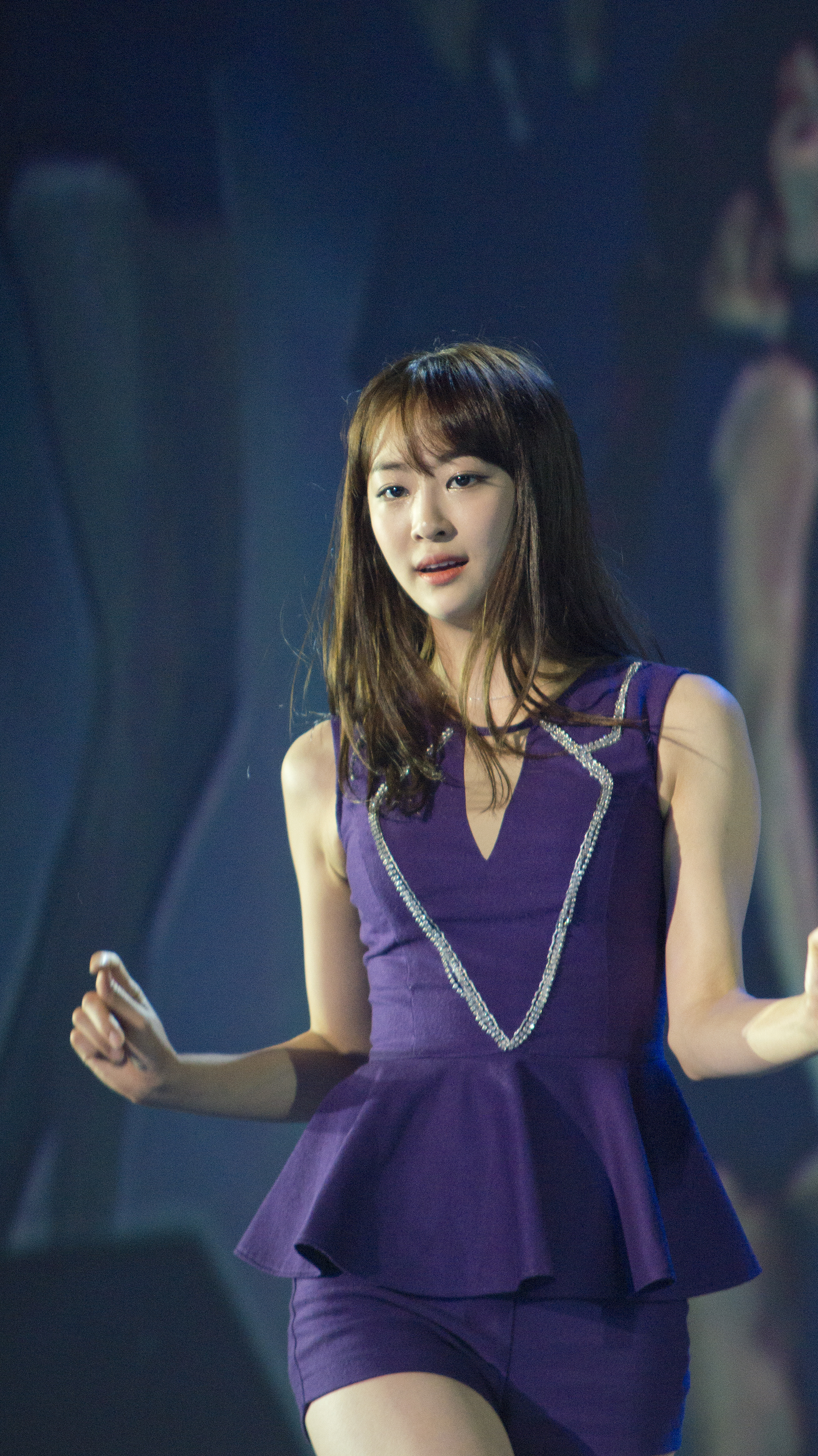
Kim performing in 2013

In January 2013, Kim co-hosted the 27th Golden Disc Awards, held in Malaysia. In April, she featured in K.Will's music video for his single, "Love Blossom". The same year, Kim starred as the female lead in the family drama, Melody of Love.

In June 2015, it was revealed that Kim will join the MBC variety show My Little Television as a regular guest. In July, Kim joined the cast of SBS TV variety show Law of the Jungle. Kim then starred in the KBS drama The Virtual Bride as the lead, which premiered in August 2015. In December, Kim made her big screen debut in the film Like a French Film.

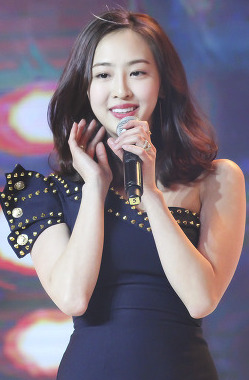
Kim performing in 2016

In January 2017, Kim collaborated with 40 and released a remake of duo Acoustic Collabo's "You and I, Heart Fluttering". The same year, Kim starred in television series Band of Sisters, playing an antagonist role.

In 2018, Kim was cast in the KBS Drama Special Ms. Kim's Mystery, as well as the tvN drama He Is Psychometric.

In June 2021, Kim chose not to renew her contract with King Kong by Starship.

On August 2, Content Lab VIVO announced that Kim and Hyolyn have collaborated as the artist of the month for the "How to Spend 2021 Well" project. The project's goal is to help the public that has been through a terrible time as a result of the COVID-19 pandemic in South Korea by donating the music profits to the socioeconomic classes. On August 6, Kim signed with her new agency, Story J Company.

== Other activities ==
=== Endorsements ===
In September 2022, Juvis Diet announced Kim as their new advertising model for their campaign titled "Change, from why to the after." They unveiled their initial commercial film for the campaign within the same month, amplifying the essential message of the importance of a healthy diet and a healthy lifestyle.

In March 2024, Dasom was selected as the endorser for Donghwa Pharmaceutical's 'Brightly Shining Barrel White' (hereinafter referred to as Barrel White), a beverage for health management in daily life.

== Discography ==
=== Collaborative singles ===
Title	Year	Peak position			Sales (DL)	Album
Title	Year	KOR	KOR Hot.	US World	Sales (DL)	Album
"You & I" with (40)	2017	100	—	—	KOR: 18,492	Vintage Box Vol. 4
"Summer or Summer" (둘 중에 골라) (with Hyolyn)	2021	94	97	24	N/A	How to Spend 2021 Well
"—" denotes releases that did not chart or were not released in that region.

=== Soundtrack appearances ===
Title	Year	Peak position	Album
Title	Year	KOR	Album
"Yayaya" (with Kim Tae-hyung)	2014	—	Melody of Love OST
"You're Mine"	2015	—	The Virtual Bride OST
"—" denotes releases that did not chart or were not released in that region.

== Filmography ==
=== Film ===
Year	Title	Role	Notes	Ref.
2015	Like a French Film	Gi Hong		
2016	Strange Living Together	Han Geun-hye		
2017	Real	Rehabilitation therapist	Cameo	
2022	Reverse	Choi Hee-soo		

=== Television series ===
Year	Title	Role	Notes	Ref.
2012–2013	Family	Woo Da-yoon		
2013–2014	Melody of Love	Gong Deul-im		
2015	The Virtual Bride	Oh In-young		
2017	Band of Sisters	Yang Dal-hee / Sera Park		
2018	Drama Special	Ms. Kim	Episode: "Ms. Kim's Mystery"	
2019	The Last Empress	Yang Dal-hee	Cameo (Episode 28, 31)	
2019	He Is Psychometric	Eun Ji-soo		
2019	Beautiful Love, Wonderful Life	Kim Da-som	Cameo (Episode 3)	
2020	Was It Love?	Joo Ah-rin		
2023	Kokdu: Season of Deity	Tae Jeong-won		
2024	Serendipity's Embrace	Kim Hye-ji		
2025	Salon de Holmes	Park So-hee		
2025	Nice to Not Meet You	Ok Ji	Cameo (Episode 4–5)	
2026	Positively Yours	Hwang Mi-ran		

=== Web series ===
Year	Title	Role	Notes	Ref.
2021	Dramaworld	Detective	Cameo	

=== Television shows ===
Year	Title	Role	Notes	Ref.
2012	Strong Heart		Ep. 146–147 with Leeteuk and Eunhyuk	
2015	My Little Television		Ep. 9–10 with Kim Gu-ra and Baek Jong-won	
2015	Law of the Jungle	Cast member	in Yap Islands	
2017	Battle Trip	Contestant	Ep. 42–45 with Soyou	
2020	Law of the Jungle	Cast member	in Pohnpei	

=== Music video appearances ===
Year	Song title	Artist	Ref.
2012	"Rock Ur Body"	VIXX	
2012	"Please Don't"	K.Will	
2013	"Love Blossom"	K.Will	
2014	"Some"	Soyou x Junggigo	

== Awards and nominations ==
Name of the award ceremony, year presented, category, nominee of the award, and the result of the nomination
Award ceremony	Year	Category	Nominee(s)/work(s)	Result	Ref.
APAN Star Awards	2014	Best New Actress	Melody of Love	Nominated	
Asian Pop Music Awards (Note: Hosted by the Hong Kong Asia Pacific International Group and Sunway Records, the Asian Pop Music Awards bases its winners on "Asian Pop Music Chart" which opened in September 2019.)	2021	Best Collaboration (Overseas)	"Summer or Summer" (with Hyolyn)	Nominated	
Baeksang Arts Awards	2018	Best New Actress – Television	Band of Sisters	Nominated	
KBS Drama Awards	2013	Best New Actress	Melody of Love	Nominated	
KBS Drama Awards	2013	Best Couple Award	Melody of Love (with Baek Sung-hyun)	Nominated	
KBS Drama Awards	2015	Best Couple Award	The Virtual Bride (with Ryu Soo-young)	Nominated	
Korea Drama Awards	2014	Best New Actress	Melody of Love	Nominated	
Mnet Asian Music Awards	2021	Best Collaboration	"Summer or Summer" (with Hyolyn)	Nominated	
SBS Drama Awards	2017	Best New Actress	Band of Sisters	Won	
SBS Drama Awards	2017	Character of the Year	Band of Sisters	Nominated	
Seoul International Youth Film Festival	2014	Best Young Actress	Melody of Love	Nominated	
