= 21st New York Asian Film Festival =

Asian film festival in New York

- Official poster
- Opening film: Fast and Feel Love by Nawapol Thamrongrattanarit
- Closing film: Alienoid by Choi Dong-hoon
- Location: Film at Lincoln Center, New York
- Founded: 2002
- Awards: Uncaged Award: The Sales Girl; Star Asia Award: Hiroshi Abe
- Hosted by: New York Asian Film Foundation Inc.
- Artistic director: Samuel Jamier
- No. of films: 70 films
- Festival date: Opening: 15 July 2022; Closing: 31 July 2022
- Language: International
- Website: NYAFF

New York Asian Film Festival
- 22nd 20th

The 21st New York Asian Film Festival began in New York from 15 July with the opening film of the festival Fast and Feel Love, a Thai film by Nawapol Thamrongrattanarit. The 21st edition was celebrated as 20th anniversary of the festival and seventy titles were screened in person. The lineup included six world premieres, eight international premieres, 19 North American premieres, four U.S. premieres, and 17 East Coast premieres. The festival closed with Korean sci-fi 2022 film Alienoid by Choi Dong-hoon on 31 July. Mongolian film The Sales Girl by Janchivdorj Sengedorj won the Uncaged Award for Best Feature Film.

This year the festival hosted a fundraising event 'Fight Cancer Night' on July 17, with the proceeds going to the American Cancer Society. Kwon Soo-kyung presented his film Stellar: A Magical Ride, which had its international premiere at the festival.

== Screening venues ==
- Film at Lincoln Center
- Walter Reade Theater
- Asia Society
- 725 Park Avenue

== Jury ==
- Anderson Le: Co-founder of East Films and artistic director of the Hawaii International Film Festival.
- Madeleine Molyneaux: Independent producer and founder, Picture Palace Pictures.
- Jason Gray: Creative producer, Loaded Films, Plan 75.
- Mayu Nakamura: Award-winning filmmaker and principal, Omphalos Pictures.

== Films showcase ==
Year	Title	Original title	Country	Director	Premiere Status
Opening film
2022	Fast and Feel Love	เร็วโหด..เหมือนโกรธเธอ	Thailand	Nawapol Thamrongrattanarit	International Premiere
Asian American Focus
2022	Dealing with Dad		USA	Tom Huang	East Coast Premiere
Beyond Borders
2021	Far Far Away	緣路山旮旯	Hong Kong	Amos Why	North American Premiere
2021	Finding Bliss: Fire and Ice - The Director's Cut	尋找極致的喜悅：火與冰	Hong Kong	Kim Chan, Dee Lam	North American Premiere
Bright Futures: The NYAFF Narrative Shorts Showcase
2021	Ateh		Philippines	Kristie Ko	North American Premiere
2021	Black Goat		Nepal	Tang Yi	New York Premiere
2021	Double Happiness	喜喜	China	Scarlett Li	New York Premiere
2021	Honekami (A Bite of Bone)	骨嚙み	Japan	Honami Yano	
2020	Natsuko		Japan	Shuna Iijima	
2021	The Sea Between Us		Singapore	Yuga J Vardhan	
2022	S.Q.A.G. (Short Quiet Asian Girl)		USA	Benedict Chiu	World Premiere
2021	Tank Fairy	桶妝仙女	Taiwan	Erich Rettstadt	New York Premiere
2021	Visitors	往訪	Japan	Kenichi Ugana	
2022	Wax and Wane		China	Beidi Wang	New York Premiere
Centerpiece Presentation
2022	Hansan: Rising Dragon	한산: 용의 출현	South Korea	Kim Han-min	U.S. Premiere
CineCina Selections
2021	Before Next Spring	如果有一天我将会离开你	China	Li Gen	North American Premiere
2021	Fire on the Plain	平原上的火焰	China	Zhang Ji	North American Premiere
2021	Manchurian Tiger	东北虎	China	Geng Jun	U.S. Premiere
2021	One and Four	一个和四个	China	Jigme Trinley	North American Premiere
2021	Ripples of Life	永安镇故事集	China	Wei Shujun	New York Premiere
2021	Virgin Blue	不要再见啊，鱼花塘	China	Niu Xiaoyu	New York Premiere
Classic Marathon
2002	The Eye	見鬼	Hong Kong, Singapore	Pang brothers	
1997	Happy Together	春光乍洩	Hong Kong	Wong Kar-wai	
2004	Kung Fu Hustle	功夫	Hong Kong, China	Stephen Chow	
2009	Overheard	竊聽風雲	Hong Kong	Felix Chong, Alan Mak	
2003	Running on Karma	大隻佬	Hong Kong	Johnnie To, Wai Ka-fai	
Closing film
2022	Alienoid	외계+인 1부	South Korea	Choi Dong-hoon	North American Premiere
Crowd Pleasers
2022	Fast and Feel Love	เร็วโหด..เหมือนโกรธเธอ	Thailand	Nawapol Thamrongrattanarit	International Premiere
2022	Mama Boy	初戀慢半拍	Taiwan	Arvin Chen	North American Premiere
2022	Mama's Affair	阿媽有咗第二個	Hong Kong	Kearen Pang	New York Premiere
2022	My Best Friend's Breakfast	我吃了那男孩一整年的早餐	Taiwan	Du Zheng Zhe	North American Premiere
2022	Offbeat Cops	異動辞令は音楽隊	Japan	Eiji Uchida	World Premiere
2022	Perhaps Love	장르만 로맨스	South Korea	Jo Eun-ji	North American Premiere
2022	Stellar: a Magical Ride	스텔라	South Korea	Kwon Soo-kyung	International Premiere
2022	Table for Six	飯戲攻心	Hong Kong	Sunny Chan	North American Premiere
2022	We Are Family	出租家人	Hong Kong	Benny Lau	World Premiere
Frontlines
2021	All the Crows in the World	天下乌鸦	Hong Kong	Tang Yi	New York Premiere
2021	Arisaka		Philippine	Mikhail Red	New York Premiere
2022	Broken Commandment	破戒	Japan	Kazuo Maeda	New York Premiere
2022	The Girl on a Bulldozer	불도저에 탄 소녀	South Korea	Park Ri-woong	North American Premiere
Genre Masters
2022	Confession	자백	South Korea	Yoon Jong-seok	New York Premiere
2002	The Eye	見鬼	Hong Kong, Singapore	Pang brothers	
2022	The Funeral	頭七	Taiwan	Dan-Guei Shen	International Premiere
2022	The Killer: A Girl Who Deserves to Die	더 킬러: 죽어도 되는 아이	South Korea	Choi Jae-hun	Special Screening
2022	Lesson in Murder	死刑にいたる病	Japan	Kazuya Shiraishi	North American Premiere
2022	Ox-Head Village	牛首村	Japan	Takashi Shimizu	North American Premiere
2021	Preman: Silent Fury		Indonesia	Randolph Zaini	New York Premiere
2003	Running on Karma	大隻佬	Hong Kong	Johnnie To, Wai Ka-fai	
2022	Shin Ultraman	シン・ウルトラマン	Japan	Shinji Higuchi	U.S. Premiere
2020	The Swordsman	검객	South Korea	Choi Jae-hun	
2012	The Thieves	도둑들	South Korea	Choi Dong-hoon	
Next/Now
2022	#LookAtMe		Singapore	Ken Kwek	World Premiere
2022	Chilli Laugh Story	闔家辣	Hong Kong	Coba Cheng	International Premiere
2022	I Haven't Done Anything		South Korea	Park Sang-min	World Premiere
2022	Legendary in Action!	大俠Action！	Hong Kong	Li Ho, Justin Cheung	North American Premiere
Standouts
2021	Big Night!		Philippines	Jun Robles Lana	New York Premiere
2022	Hot Blooded	뜨거운 피	South Korea	Cheon Myeong-kwan	U.S. Premiere
2021	I Am More	모어	South Korea	Lee Il-ha	International Premiere
2022	Next Door	옆집사람	South Korea	Yeom Ji-ho	U.S. Premiere
Vanguards
2022	Grown-ups	わたし達はおとな	Japan	Takuya Kato	International Premiere
2022	Intimate Stranger	親密な他人	Japan	Mayu Nakamura	North American Premiere
2021	Life For Sale	售命	Taiwan	Tom Teng	International Premiere
2021	Nothing Serious	연애 빠진 로맨스	South Korea	Jeong Ga-young	New York Premiere
2022	Ribbon		Japan	Non	East Coast Premiere
2021	Terrorizers	青春弒戀	Taiwan	Ho Wi-ding	New York Premiere

=== Films by country or region ===
Year	Title	Original title	Region/Country	Director	Premiere status
Hong Kong Panorama
2022	Chilli Laugh Story	闔家辣	Hong Kong	Coba Cheng	International Premiere
2010	Dream Home	維多利亞壹號	Hong Kong	Pang Ho-cheung	Tribute to Josie Ho
2002	The Eye	見鬼	Hong Kong, Singapore	Pang brothers	
2021	Far Far Away	緣路山旮旯	Hong Kong	Amos Why	North American Premiere
2021	Finding Bliss: Fire and Ice - The Director's Cut	尋找極致的喜悅：火與冰	Hong Kong	Kim Chan, Dee Lam	North American Premiere
2015	Full Strike	全力扣殺	Hong Kong	Derek Kwok, Henri Wong	Tribute to Josie Ho
1997	Happy Together	春光乍洩	Hong Kong	Wong Kar-wai	
2004	Kung Fu Hustle	功夫	Hong Kong, China	Stephen Chow	
2022	Legendary in Action!	大俠Action！	Hong Kong	Li Ho, Justin Cheung	North American Premiere
2022	Mama's Affair	阿媽有咗第二個	Hong Kong	Kearen Pang	New York Premiere
2009	Overheard	竊聽風雲	Hong Kong	Felix Chong, Alan Mak	
2003	Running on Karma	大隻佬	Hong Kong	Johnnie To, Wai Ka-fai	
2022	Table for Six	飯戲攻心	Hong Kong	Sunny Chan	North American Premiere
2022	We Are Family	出租家人	Hong Kong	Benny Lau	World Premiere
New Cinema from Japan
2022	Angry Son	世界は僕らに気づかない	Japan	Kasho Iizuka	North American Premiere
2022	Broken Commandment	破戒	Japan	Kazuo Maeda	New York Premiere
2022	Grown-ups	わたし達はおとな	Japan	Takuya Kato	International Premiere
2022	Intimate Stranger	親密な他人	Japan	Mayu Nakamura	North American Premiere
2022	Lesson in Murder	死刑にいたる病	Japan	Kazuya Shiraishi	North American Premiere
2022	Offbeat Cops	異動辞令は音楽隊	Japan	Eiji Uchida	World Premiere
2022	Ox-Head Village	牛首村	Japan	Takashi Shimizu	North American Premiere
2022	Ribbon		Japan	Non	East Coast Premiere
2022	Shin Ultraman	シン・ウルトラマン	Japan	Shinji Higuchi	U.S. Premiere
South Korea
2022	Alienoid	외계+인 1부	South Korea	Choi Dong-hoon	North American Premiere
2022	Confession	자백	South Korea	Yoon Jong-seok	New York Premiere
2022	The Girl on a Bulldozer	불도저에 탄 소녀	South Korea	Park Ri-woong	North American Premiere
2022	Hansan: Rising Dragon	한산: 용의 출현	South Korea	Kim Han-min	U.S. Premiere
2022	Hot Blooded	뜨거운 피	South Korea	Cheon Myeong-kwan	U.S. Premiere
2021	I Am More	모어	South Korea	Lee Il-ha	International Premiere
2022	I Haven't Done Anything		South Korea	Park Sang-min	World Premiere
2022	The Killer: A Girl Who Deserves to Die	더 킬러: 죽어도 되는 아이	South Korea	Choi Jae-hun	Special Screening
2022	Next Door	옆집사람	South Korea	Yeom Ji-ho	U.S. Premiere
2021	Nothing Serious	연애 빠진 로맨스	South Korea	Jeong Ga-young	New York Premiere
2022	Perhaps Love	장르만 로맨스	South Korea	Jo Eun-ji	North American Premiere
2022	Stellar: a Magical Ride	스텔라	South Korea	Kwon Soo-kyung	International Premiere
2020	The Swordsman	검객	South Korea	Choi Jae-hun	
2012	The Thieves	도둑들	South Korea	Choi Dong-hoon	
Southeast Asia
2022	#LookAtMe		Singapore	Ken Kwek	World Premiere
2021	Arisaka		Philippine	Mikhail Red	New York Premiere
2021	Big Night!		Philippines	Jun Robles Lana	New York Premiere
2022	Fast and Feel Love	เร็วโหด..เหมือนโกรธเธอ	Thailand	Nawapol Thamrongrattanarit	International Premiere
2022	Imaginur		Malaysia	Nik Amir Mustapha	World Premiere
2021	Preman: Silent Fury		Indonesia	Randolph Zaini	New York Premiere
Taiwan
2022	The Funeral	頭七	Taiwan	Dan-Guei Shen	International Premiere
2021	Life For Sale	售命	Taiwan	Tom Teng	International Premiere
2022	Mama Boy	初戀慢半拍	Taiwan	Arvin Chen	North American Premiere
2022	My Best Friend's Breakfast	我吃了那男孩一整年的早餐	Taiwan	Du Zheng Zhe	North American Premiere
2022	Reclaim	一家之主	Taiwan	CJ Wang	International Premiere
2021	Terrorizers	青春弒戀	Taiwan	Ho Wi-ding	New York Premiere

== Uncaged Award for Best Feature Film Competition ==
Highlighted title indicates award winner

Year	Title	Original title	Country	Director	Award status
2022	#LookAtMe		Singapore	Ken Kwek	
2022	Angry Son	世界は僕らに気づかない	Japan	Kasho Iizuka	
2022	Fast and Feel Love	เร็วโหด..เหมือนโกรธเธอ	Thailand	Nawapol Thamrongrattanarit	
2022	Imaginur		Malaysia	Nik Amir Mustapha	
2021	One and Four	一个和四个	Tibetan	Jigme Trinley	
2022	Perhaps Love	장르만 로맨스	South Korea	Jo Eun-ji	
2022	Reclaim	一家之主	Taiwan	CJ Wang	
2022	The Sales Girl	Худалдагч охин	Mongolia	Janchivdorj Sengedorj	Won

== Awards and winners ==
=== Uncaged Award for Best Feature Film ===
Year	Title	Original Title	Country	Director/Actor	Ref.
2022	The Sales Girl	Худалдагч охин	Mongolia	Janchivdorj Sengedorj	

=== Audience Award ===
Year	Title	Original Title	Country	Director/Actor	Ref.
2022	Chilli Laugh Story	闔家辣	Hong Kong	Coba Cheng	
2022	Perhaps Love	장르만 로맨스	South Korea	Jo Eun-ji	

=== Daniel Craft Award for Excellence in Action Cinema ===
Actor	Country	Film/s	Ref.
Jang Hyuk	South Korea	The Swordsman and The Killer: A Girl Who Deserves to Die	

=== Star Asia Awards ===
Image	Recipient	Country	Ref.
Screen International Star Asia Award
	Hiroshi Abe	Japan	
Screen International Star Asia Lifetime Achievement Award
	Takashi Shimizu	Japan	
Screen International Rising Star Asia Award
	Kim Hye-yoon	South Korea	
	Urassaya Sperbund	Thailand	
Best from the East Award
	Ryu Seung-ryong	South Korea	
