= Korean Peninsula (TV series) =

2012 South Korean television series

- Promotional poster
- Also known as: Hanbando
- Hangul: 한반도
- Hanja: 韓半島
- RR: Hanbando
- MR: Hanbando
- Genre: Political; Action; Romance; Drama
- Written by: Yoon Sun-joo
- Directed by: Lee Hyung-min
- Starring: Hwang Jung-min; Kim Jung-eun
- Composer: Park Sung-il
- Country of origin: South Korea
- Original language: Korean
- No. of episodes: 18

Production
- Production location: Korea
- Running time: Mondays and Tuesdays at 20:50 (KST)
- Production company: RaemongRaein
- Budget: ₩10 billion

Original release
- Network: TV Chosun
- Release: February 6 – April 3, 2012

Korean Peninsula (Korean: 한반도; RR: Hanbando) is a 2012 South Korean television series starring Hwang Jung-min and Kim Jung-eun. It aired on newly launched cable channel TV Chosun from February 6 to April 3, 2012, on Mondays and Tuesdays at 20:50 for 18 episodes.

== Plot ==
Seo Myung-joon is a South Korean scientist who falls in love with North Korean scientist Im Jin-jae while developing an alternative energy source together. But when Myung-joon unexpectedly becomes the president of a reunified Korea, political tensions rise as a massive struggle for limited natural resources continues to divide the country.

== Cast ==
- Hwang Jung-min as Seo Myung-joon
- Kim Jung-eun as Im Jin-jae
- Jo Sung-ha as Park Do-myung, chief presidential secretary
- Kwak Hee-sung as Min Dong-ki
- Jo Yi-jin as Park Hye-jung
- Ji Hoo as Kang Dong-won
- Sung Byung-sook as Jung Hyun-sook
- Kang Soo-min as Baek Do-jin
- Jung Jae-hun as Seo Jang-yeob
- Kim Jung-kyeon as Hong Hak-soo
- Jung Wook as Shin Chang-seok
- Lee Won-suk as Kim Jung-sik
- Lee Soon-jae as Kang Dae-hyun
- Ahn Nam-hee as Na Yeon-sung
- Choi Il-hwa as Park Jung-pyo
- Yeon Ye-hee as Song Seung-joo
- Lee Hae-young as Han Young-hoon
- Choi Dae-hoon as Chae Dong-hoon
- Jung Dong-hwan as Oh Chang-il
- Yoon Joo-sang as Seok Joo-hwan
- Go In-beom as Chief of staff
- Jung Dong-gyu as Kim Won-ho
- Park Geun-soo as Jung Cheol
- Jung Sung-mo as Jo Gook-cheol
- Kim Ji-sook as Han Kyung-ok
- Kim Ha-kyun as Kim Deuk-soo
- Kim Su-hyeon as Lee Young-choon
- Jung Jin as Jung Yong-gi
- Seo Tae-hwa as Kim Tae-sung
- Park Chan-hwan as Lim Cheol-woo
- Heo Jung-gyu as Dong Jung-geun
- Lee Hee-seok as Kang Hee-joong
- Hwang Chan-woo as Kim Yong-soo
- Heo Jae-ho as Jeon Joong-won
- Yang Hee-yoon as Lee Sung-ho
- Jang Nam-yeol as Kim Ho-taek
- Lee Cheol-min as Jo Kap-seok
- Choi Jae-hwan as Park Gwang-tae
- Ji Woo-seok as Cha Seung-jae
- Kim Jae-rok as Koo Yeon-cheol

== Reception ==
Despite a big budget of ₩10 billion, Korean Peninsula underperformed in the ratings. The action/political thriller premiered with a promising rating of 1.649%, but succeeding episodes dropped to around 0.8%. This led to TV Chosun cutting down the number of episodes from the planned 24 to 18.
