= Definitely Neighbors =

2010 South Korean television drama

- Promotional poster
- Also known as: Neighbor Enemies; Neighboring Exes
- Genre: Drama; Romance; Family
- Written by: Choi Hyun-kyung
- Directed by: Jo Nam-kook
- Starring: Son Hyun-joo; Yoo Ho-jeong; Kim Sung-ryung; Shin Sung-rok
- Country of origin: South Korea
- Original language: Korean
- No. of episodes: 65

Production
- Production location: Korea
- Running time: Saturdays and Sundays at 20:50 (KST)

Original release
- Network: Seoul Broadcasting System
- Release: 13 March – 31 October 2010

Definitely Neighbors (Korean: 이웃집 웬수; RR: Iutjip wensu; also known as Neighbor Enemies) is a 2010 South Korean television drama starring Son Hyun-joo, Yoo Ho-jeong, Kim Sung-ryung and Shin Sung-rok. It aired on SBS from March 13 to October 31, 2010 on Saturdays and Sundays at 20:50 for 65 episodes.

== Plot ==
A divorced couple become next-door neighbors.

== Cast ==
- Son Hyun-joo as Kim Sung-jae
- Yoo Ho-jeong as Yoon Ji-young
- Kim Sung-ryung as Kang Mi-jin
- Shin Sung-rok as Jang Geun-hee
- Kim Mi-sook as Chae Young-shil
- Han Chae-ah as Yoon Ha-young
- Choi Won-young as Chae Ki-hoon
- Kim Ye-ryeong as Jang Se-hee
- Park Young-ji as Geun-hee's father
- Hong Yo-seob as Kim Woo-jin
- Park Geun-hyung as Yoon In-soo
- Jung Jae-soon as Lee Sun-ok
- Ban Hyo-jung as Lee Jung-soon
- Ahn Eun-jung as Kim Eun-seo
- Cha Jae-dol as Song Joon-se
- Lee Hye-sook as Han Soo-hee
- Joo Ho as Lee Nam-shik
- Park Sang-hoon as Sang-gyu
- Jung Soo-in as Yoo-jin

== Awards ==
2010 SBS Drama Awards

- Human Drama Award
- Top Excellence Award, Actor in a Weekend/Daily Drama: Son Hyun-joo
- Top Excellence Award, Actress in a Weekend/Daily Drama: Yoo Ho-jeong
- Best Supporting Actor in a Weekend/Daily Drama: Shin Sung-rok
- New Star Award: Han Chae-ah

== See also ==
- Seoul Broadcasting System
