= Confession (2022 film) =

2022 South Korean mystery thriller film

- Official poster
- Hangul: 자백
- Hanja: 自白
- RR: Jabaek
- MR: Chabaek
- Directed by: Yoon Jong-seok
- Screenplay by: Yoon Jong-seok
- Based on: The Invisible Guest by Oriol Paulo
- Produced by: Won Dong-yeon; Kim Ji-hong
- Starring: So Ji-sub; Kim Yunjin; Nana; Hwang Sun-hee
- Cinematography: Kim Seong-jin
- Edited by: Heo Seon-mi; Jo Han-wool
- Music by: Mowg
- Production company: Realize Pictures
- Distributed by: Lotte Entertainment
- Release dates: March 20, 2022 (FIFF); October 26, 2022 (South Korea)
- Running time: 105 minutes
- Country: South Korea
- Language: Korean
- Box office: est. US$5.6 million

Confession (Korean: 자백; RR: Jabaek) is a 2022 South Korean mystery thriller film directed by Yoon Jong-seok, starring So Ji-sub, Kim Yunjin, Nana and Hwang Sun-hee. Based on Oriol Paulo's 2016 Spanish film The Invisible Guest, the film depicts a story about a man who has been pointed out as the culprit of a locked-room murder and his lawyer approaching the truth.

The film had its premiere at 36th Fribourg International Film Festival on March 20, 2022, and its Italian premium at 24th Udine Far East Film Festival on April 30, 2022, as closing film of the festival. It was released theatrically in South Korea on October 26, 2022.

== Plot ==
Yoo Min-ho, CEO of an IT company, is the prime suspect for the murder of Kim See-hee, his former mistress, after the police find him with her body in a hotel room that was locked from the inside. Min-ho's lawyer recommends that Min-ho engage crack defense attorney Yang Shin-ae to defend him.

Shin-ae travels to Min-ho's remote snow-covered cabin to meet him for the first time and decide if she wants to take the case. Min-ho tells her that he and See-hee hadn't seen each other since they ended their affair two months earlier, and they only met at the hotel following the instructions of someone who was trying to blackmail them over the affair. Min-ho claims that an unseen assailant attacked him, and when he awoke See-hee was already dead.

Shin-ae advises Min-ho to be truthful with her, as she suspects that the case is connected with the disappearance of a young man named Han Seon-jae. Min-ho says that two months ago he and See-hee met at the cabin, where he ended the affair. As they were leaving in Min-ho's company car, See-hee swerved the car to avoid a deer, which caused their car to stall and another car to crash into a boulder. Fearful of having their affair exposed, See-hee convinced Min-ho to get rid of the other car and its dead driver, Seon-jae. While Min-ho left to dispose the car and body, See-hee waited in the stalled company car, and was helped by Han Young-seok, a mechanic who happened to be passing by. Young-seok is Seon-jae's father.

Min-ho and See-hee returned to their lives, and Min-ho had his lawyer destroy the implicated company car and report it as stolen. However, Young-seok reported Seon-jae's disappearance and shared a description of See-hee and the car with the police, making her a suspect.

Shin-ae suggests to Min-ho that the blackmail message he received was not about the affair, but about the incident with Seon-jae. She tells Min-ho that Seon-jae's mother, Lee Hee-jung, was the receptionist at the hotel, and that it's possible that Seon-jae's parents worked together to kill See-hee and frame Min-ho to avenge their son. Min-ho approves of this defense strategy and claims that he saw Young-seok in the room, but Shin-ae calls this out as a lie.

Shin-ae reveals that she lied about Seon-jae's mother working in the hotel, in order to force Min-ho to tell the truth. Shin-ae suggests that Min-ho was the real decision-maker of the incident instead of See-hee: he was driving the car and he decided to cover it up by disposing of the body. See-hee, however, was racked with guilt and contacted Young-seok to admit her role in Seon-jae's disappearance. There was no blackmailer; See-hee sent the message to Min-ho to meet at the hotel, where she hoped to convince him to confess as well, but Min-ho killed her and let himself be arrested by the police.

Min-ho confesses that this scenario is accurate and that he did kill See-hee. Shin-ae signs the agreement committing herself to be Min-ho's attorney and proposes that they plant evidence on Seon-jae's body to let See-hee be posthumously solely responsible for covering up his death. Min-ho points to the lake where he sunk the car on a map but adds that Shin-ae needs to destroy the wrench that is in the car; Seon-jae was still alive when Min-ho was about to push the car into the water, and Min-ho beat him to death with the wrench.

It is revealed that Shin-ae is Lee Hee-jung, Seon-jae's mother and a retired actress. She and Young-seok kidnapped the real Yang Shin-ae in order to stage the meeting with Min-ho and have him confess where Seon-jae's body is. Min-ho realizes the truth when he compares the real Shin-ae's signature with Hee-jung's. He attacks Hee-jung and reveals that he lied about the location of the body. He calls the police and makes it appear that Hee-jung tried to kill him. The police arrest Hee-Jung and Yeong-Seok, the latter of whom was outside listening in on the conversation.

However, Hee-jung has realized that Min-ho traveled to the cabin on purpose. Seon-jae's car and body are in the lake directly next to the cabin, and Min-ho came here only to find the wrench that he used to kill Seon-jae. The police dig into the frozen lake and find the car, which prompts Min-ho's arrest.

== Cast ==
- So Ji-sub as Yoo Min-ho
- Kim Yunjin as Yang Shin-ae/Lee Hee-jung
- Nana as Kim Se-hee
- Hwang Sun-hee
- Choi Kwang-il as Han Young-seok
- Hong Seo-joon as Jang Tae-soo
- Han Gap-soo as Han Seon-jae
- Park Mi-hyun as a hotel receptionist

== Production ==
In September 2019, it was announced that So Ji-sub will return to films with the film Confession, and Kim Yunjin was cast to play the female lead. In November 2019, Nana was cast in the film. Principal photography began on December 16, 2019, and the film was wrapped up on February 29, 2020.

== Release ==
Confession had its premiere at 36th Fribourg International Film Festival on March 20, 2022 In April 2022, it was invited to 42nd Fantasporto - Oporto International Film Festival in competition section, where it won Best Director Award. It was also selected as the closing film at the 24th Udine Far East Film Festival held from April 24 to April 30, 2022. In July 2022, it was invited at the 21st New York Asian Film Festival, where it was screened at Lila Acheson Wallace Auditorium, Asia Society on July 23 for its North American premiere. It was also invited to the 26th Fantasia International Film Festival and screened for its Canadian premiere on July 31, 2022.

The film was invited at the 40th Brussels International Fantastic Film Festival and was screened for Belgian premiere on September 1, 2022.

The film was released theatrically on October 26, 2022, in South Korea.

=== Home media ===
The film was made available for streaming on IPTV (KT olleh TV, SK Btv, LG U+ TV), Home Choice, Google Play, Apple TV, TVING, WAVVE, Naver TV, KT skylife, and Coupang Play from December 6, 2022.

== Reception ==
Teresa Vena of Asian Movie Pulse appreciated the direction, cinematography and performance and wrote, "Thanks to its great actors not only in the two main roles, "Confession" is more than a simple crime movie. It also fascinates with its intelligent structure. Only the ending leaves one a little bit unsatisfied."

== Accolades ==
Year	Award	Category	Recipient(s)	Result	Ref.
2022	Fantasporto - Oporto International Film Festival	Directors Week – Best Director Award (Melhor Realização)	Yoon Jong-seok	Won	
2022	24th Udine Far East Film Festival	Best Screenplay	Yoon Jong-seok	Nominated	
