= GWSN =

South Korean girl group

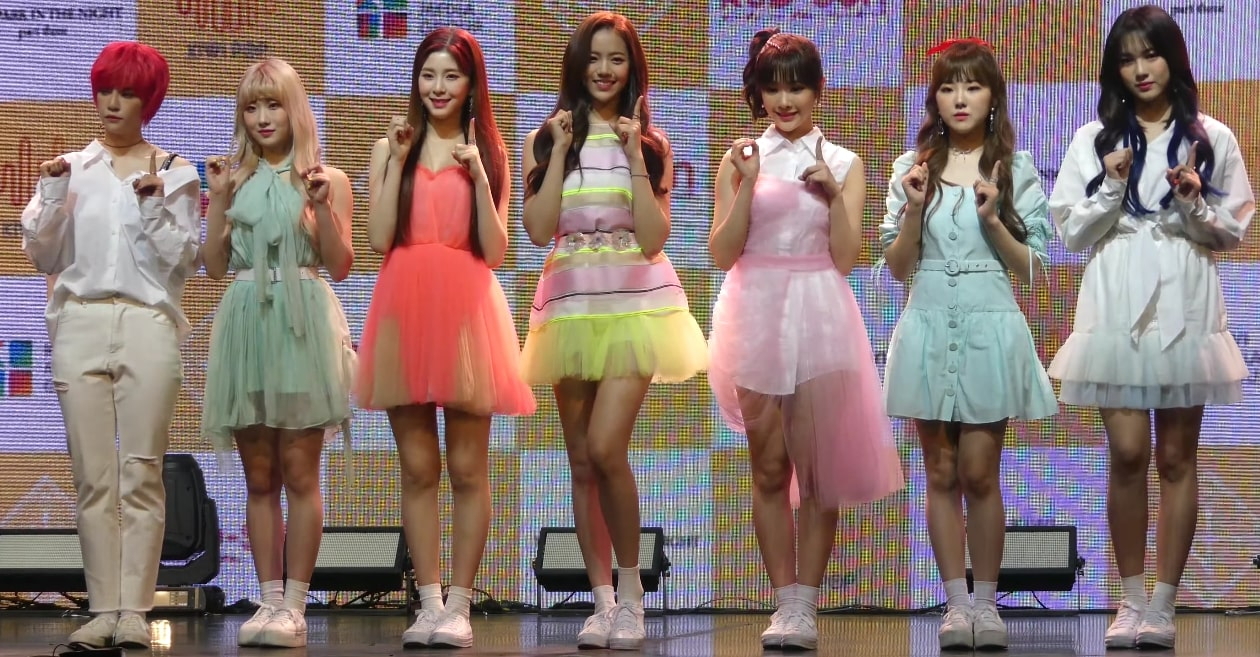
- GWSN in July 2019 (From left to right: Miya, Seoryoung, Minju, Lena, Anne, Seokyoung, SoSo)

Background information
- Origin: Seoul, South Korea
- Genres: K-pop
- Years active: 2018–2023
- Labels: The Wave Music
- Past members: Miya; Seokyoung; Seoryoung; Anne; Minju; SoSo; Lena

Korean name
- Hangul: 공원소녀
- Hanja: 公園少女
- Lit.: Park Girl
- RR: Gongwon sonyeo
- MR: Kongwŏn sonyŏ

Japanese name
- Kanji: 公園少女
Transcriptions
- Romanization: Kōen Shōjo

Chinese name
- Traditional Chinese: 公園少女
- Simplified Chinese: 公园少女
Transcriptions
Standard Mandarin
- Hanyu Pinyin: Gōngyuán Shàonǚ

GWSN (Korean: 공원소녀), also known as Girls in the Park, was a South Korean girl group formed in 2018 by Kiwi Pop (now known as The Wave Music). The group consisted of seven members: Miya, Seokyoung, Seoryoung, Anne, Minju, Soso, and Lena, and debuted on September 5, 2018 with the title track "Puzzle Moon" from their extended play The Park in the Night Part One.

== Name ==
GWSN is an abbreviation of Gongwon Sonyeo. The group describes "gongwon" (lit. park) as a place "where anyone, who is male or female or old or young, can go and enjoy themselves, heal their wounds and dream". The abbreviation also has a separate meaning in English, with G standing for 'Ground' and WSN standing for the directional markers 'West,' 'South,' and 'North,' with the significance being that the group wants to reach out to people from every direction. 'Gong-won' can also be translated into 'gong,' meaning zero in Korean, and 'won,' which represents the English word one, meaning that when the seven members get together, they will forever be one.

== History ==
=== 2018–2019: Debut with The Park in the Night series ===
On June 14, 2018, Kiwi Pop, a subsidiary of Kiwi Media Group, released a teaser image for their first girl group named GWSN and the opening of their social media accounts with their reveal date set to June 18, 2018. Shortly after, members were each revealed along with a short video and an image starting with Minju, followed by Lena, Anne, Soso, Seoryoung, Miya, and finally Seokyoung, who was a former contestant on Mnet's Produce 101 TV series, where she came in 30th place.

In order to increase their pre-debut popularity, the group held multiple busking events all over South Korea in public spaces, performed in middle schools and high schools, as well as held live video events on their Facebook page and uploaded dance covers of popular songs onto their YouTube.

On July 8, Mnet announced a reality TV show named Got Ya! GWSN featuring all the members of GWSN.

On September 5, 2018, GWSN made their debut with the extended play (EP) The Park in the Night Part One with the lead single, "Puzzle Moon". They then went onto holding their debut showcase at Yes24 Live Hall, Seoul, South Korea. They officially made their debut in the Korean music program M Countdown on September 6.

On March 13, 2019, GWSN released their second EP The Park in the Night Part Two, with the lead single "Pinky Star (Run)".

GWSN released their first studio album The Park in the Night Part Three along with the lead single "Red-Sun (021)" on July 23. This was funded through fan contribution on Makestar, where a total of US$27,491.03 was raised.

On October 2, GWSN was the opening act for Jessica Jung's fanmeeting in Japan, XOXO Jessica Jung Fan Meeting.

=== 2020–2023: The Keys, The Other Side of the Moon and disbandment ===
On January 17, 2020, it was announced that member Soso would be taking a hiatus due to a ruptured ankle ligament and that the group will continue to promote as six members. On April 3, 2020, it was reported that GWSN was moved to a new sub-label from Kiwi Media Group known as MILES. The group made their comeback on April 28 with their third EP The Keys and its title track "Bazooka!", without member Soso.

GWSN was set to release their fourth EP The Other Side of the Moon and its lead single "Like It Hot" on May 20, 2021, but the album's release date was pushed back to May 26. The group would be moved to The Wave Music, which was formerly named Kiwi Media Group.

In 2022, Anne made her screen debut as Kim Yoon-ji in The Killer: A Girl Who Deserves to Die.

On January 22, 2023, it was announced through multiple news outlets that all 7 members' exclusive contracts with The Wave Music had been terminated on the 12th of that month by the Seoul Central District Court. On June 28, 2023, Miya confirmed in an interview with NHK that GWSN had disbanded in January after all 7 members won the lawsuit.

== Members ==
- Miya (미야)
- Seokyoung (서경)
- Seoryoung (서령)
- Anne (앤)
- Minju (민주)
- Soso (소소)
- Lena (레나)

== Discography ==
=== Extended plays ===
Title	Album details	Peak chart positions	Sales
Title	Album details	KOR	Sales
The Park in the Night Part One	Released: September 5, 2018; Label: Kiwi Pop, Kiwi Media Group; Formats: CD, digital download; Track listing: 1. Puzzle Moon (퍼즐문); 2. Shy Shy (볼터치); 3. Let it Grow ~ a little tree 4. Yolowa (욜로와); 5. Melting Point; 6. Lullaby (잘자)	12	KOR: 9,301
The Park in the Night Part Two	Released: March 13, 2019; Label: Kiwi Pop, Kiwi Media Group; Formats: CD, digital download; Track listing: 1. Pinky Star (Run); 2. Toktok (수천 개의 별, 수천 개의 꿈); 3. Bloom (True Light); 4. Miss Ping Pong; 5. One & Only; 6. Growing; 7. Toktok (the park night version)	11	KOR: 7,703
The Park in the Night Part Three	Released: July 23, 2019; Label: Kiwi Pop, Kiwi Media Group; Formats: CD, digital download; Track listing: 1. Red-Sun (021); 2. All Mine (Coast of Azure); 3. The Interpretation of Dreams (밤의 비행); 4. Total Eclipse (Black Out); 5. Birthday Girl ~ 19 candles 6. Kind of Cool; 7. Black Hole; 8. Recipe ~ for Simon	13	KOR: 6,373
The Keys	Released: April 28, 2020; Label: Miles Entertainment; Formats: CD, digital download	6	KOR: 6,879
The Other Side of the Moon	Released: May 26, 2021; Label: The Wave Music; Formats: CD, digital download	18	KOR: 8,626

=== Singles ===
Title	Year	Peak chart positions	Album
Title	Year	KOR DL	Album
"Puzzle Moon" (퍼즐문)	2018	—	The Park in the Night Part One
"Pinky Star (Run)"	2019	—	The Park in the Night Part Two
"Red-Sun (021)"	2019	—	The Park in the Night Part Three
"Bazooka!"	2020	—	The Keys
"Like It Hot"	2021	113	The Other Side of the Moon
"—" denotes releases that did not chart or were not released in that region.

=== Soundtrack appearances ===
Song	Year	Member(s)	Album
"Oh Lady Go Lady"	2018	All	Clean with Passion for Now OST Part 2
"Be Your Star"	2019	Seoryoung, Lena (GWSN)	Touch Your Heart OST Part 4
"I'm in Love"	2019	All	Mother of Mine OST Part 4

== Videography ==
=== Music videos ===
Year	Title	Director(s)	Ref.
2018	"Puzzle Moon" (퍼즐문)	Jiyong Kim (FantazyLab)	—
2018	"Color Me" (물들여줘) (feat. Son Dong-woon)		
2019	"We Need a Change" (feat. Jack Walton)		
2019	"Pinky Star" (Run)	Jiyong Kim (FantazyLab)	
2019	"Growing" (for Groo)		
2019	"Pinky Star" (Run) (choreography ver.)		
2019	"Red-Sun" (021)	Korlio (August Frogs Visual)	—
2019	"Red-Sun" (021) (performance ver.)		
2019	"Total Eclipse" (Black Out)		
2020	"Bazooka!"	Hong Won-Ki	
2020	"Bazooka! (performance ver.)	Hong Won-Ki	
2020	"Bazooka!" (stay safe with GWSN ver.)		
2021	"Like It Hot"	TBA	

=== Television shows ===
Year	Title	Network
2018	Got Ya! GWSN	Mnet

== Awards and nominations ==
Name of the award ceremony, year presented, award category, nominee(s) of the award and the result of the nomination
Award ceremony	Year	Award category	Work(s)/nominee(s)	Result	Ref.
Genie Music Awards	2019	New Artist Award	GWSN	Nominated	
Genie Music Awards	2019	The Female New Artist	GWSN	Nominated	
Genie Music Awards	2019	Genie Music Popularity Award	GWSN	Nominated	
Genie Music Awards	2019	Global Popularity Award	GWSN	Nominated	
Korea Culture Entertainment Awards	2019	K-Pop Singer Award	GWSN	Won	
Mnet Asian Music Awards	2018	Best New Female Artist	GWSN	Nominated	
Mnet Asian Music Awards	2018	Artist of the Year	GWSN	Nominated	
Seoul Success Awards	2018	New Artist Award	GWSN	Won	
Soribada Best K-Music Awards	2020	Rising Star Award	GWSN	Won	
