= The Keys (EP) =

EP by GWSN
- Released: April 28, 2020
- Recorded: 2020
- Genre: Dance-pop; disco; jazz
- Length: 14:20
- Language: Korean
- Label: Miles; Sony Music Korea

GWSN chronology
The Park in the Night Part Three (2019)	The Keys (2020)	The Other Side of the Moon (2021)

Singles from the Keys
- 1. "Bazooka!" Released: April 28, 2020

The Keys (stylized as the Keys) is the fourth extended play by South Korean girl group GWSN, released by Miles Entertainment on April 28, 2020. The EP features four tracks, with "BAZOOKA!" serving as the title track. Member Soso did not participate in this release for health reasons.

== Background ==
The Keys is GWSN's first release since moving to a new label (MILES), which is a subsidiary of their original entertainment company, Kiwi Media Group. Member Soso was absent from this release due to an ankle injury.

== Commercial performance ==
The Keys debuted at number 6 on South Korea's Gaon Album Chart, becoming the group's first top ten entry. The EP sold 4,270 copies for the month of April 2020, thus within two days. It has sold 6,879 copies as of June 2020.

== Track listing ==
the Keys track listing
No.	Title	Lyrics	Music	Arrangement	Length
1.	"Bazooka!"	Llano; peacedelicsu	Nermin Harambašić, Anne Judith Stokke Wik, Ronny Svendsen; Fabian Torsson; Harry Sommerdahl	Fabian Torsson; Harry Sommerdahl	3:15
2.	"the Aerialist (Wonderboy)" (공중곡예사)	Kim Yeonseo	Kim Yeonseo; minGtion; An Shinae	minGtion	3:09
3.	"Tweaks ~ Heavy cloud but no rain"	Llano	Andreas Öberg; Daniel "Obi" Klein; Charli Taft	Daniel "Obi" Klein	3:47
4.	"After the bloom (alone)"	Llano; peacedelicsu	Jan Baars; Rajan Muse; Ronnie Icon; Nathalie Boone	Jan Baars; Rajan Muse; Ronnie Icon	4:09
Total length:					14:20

== Charts ==
Sales chart performance for the Keys
Chart (2020)	Peak position
South Korean Albums (Gaon)	6
