= The Virtual Bride =

2015 Korean comedy television series

- Promotional poster
- Genre: Comedy; Family
- Written by: Moon Sun-hee; Yoo Nam-kyung
- Directed by: Lee Duk-gun; Park Man-young
- Starring: Kim Dasom; Go Doo-shim; Ryu Soo-young
- Country of origin: South Korea
- Original language: Korean
- No. of episodes: 12

Production
- Running time: 70 minutes
- Production company: Raemongraein Co. Ltd.

Original release
- Network: Korean Broadcasting System
- Release: August 17 – September 22, 2015

The Virtual Bride (Korean: 별난 며느리; RR: Byeollan myeoneuri; lit. 'The Eccentric Daughter-in-Law'), is a 2015 South Korean drama series starring Kim Dasom, Go Doo-shim and Ryu Soo-young. It aired on KBS2 from August 17 to September 22, 2015 on Mondays and Tuesdays at 21:55 for 12 episodes.

== Plot ==
In order to boost her flagging popularity, former idol group singer Oh In-young (Kim Dasom) agrees to appear in a television reality show that pairs up fake mothers- and daughters-in-law. In-young's partner is Yang Choon-ja (Go Doo-shim), the matriarch of a long-standing traditional clan, and they end up hating each other on the show. But as fate would have it, the two later end up becoming mother and daughter-in-law for real.

== Cast ==
- Kim Da-som as Oh In-young
- Go Doo-shim as Yang Choon-ja
- Ryu Soo-young as Cha Myeong-seok
- Kwak Hee-sung as Cha Dong-seok
- Kim Yoon-seo as Kim Se-mi
- Kim Seong-hwan as Cha Il-goo
- Park Woong as Cha Joo-bok
- Baek Ok-dam as Lee Ha-ji
- Kim Bo-yeon as Jang Mi-hee
- Ki Tae-young as Kang Joon-soo
- Son Eun-seo as Cha Young-ah
- Lee Moon-hee as Choi Soon-hee
- Lee Seung-woo as Cha San
- Kyung Joon as Bae Yong-joon
- Lee Yong-joo as Oh Sang-sik
- Jung Da-sol as Heo Soon-jung

== Title changes ==
Its early working titles include Killing Mother-in-Law (시어머니 죽이기) and Taming Mother-in-Law (시어머니 길들이기).

== Ratings ==
Episode #	Original broadcast date	Average Audience Share			
Episode #	Original broadcast date	TNmS Ratings		AGB Nielsen	
Episode #	Original broadcast date	Nationwide	Seoul National Capital Area	Nationwide	Seoul National Capital Area
1	August 17, 2015	4.6%	4.6%	6.0%	5.7%
2	August 18, 2015	5.1%	–	5.9%	5.5%
3	August 24, 2015	4.5%	–	5.7%	5.2%
4	August 25, 2015	5.1%	5.0%	4.9%	4.7%
5	August 31, 2015	4.5%	4.7%	4.1%	4.0%
6	September 1, 2015	4.2%	4.2%	5.7%	5.6%
7	September 7, 2015	4.7%	5.0%	5.3%	5.2%
8	September 8, 2015	5.7%	–	5.7%	5.5%
9	September 14, 2015	4.9%	–	4.3%	4.2%
10	September 15, 2015	4.6%	–	3.9%	3.9%
11	September 21, 2015	4.4%	5.0%	3.7%	3.5%
12	September 22, 2015	4.3%	4.3%	5.2%	4.9%
Average		4.7%	4.7%	5.0%	4.8%

== See also ==
- We Got Married
- The Great Marriage
