= Baek Ok-dam =

South Korean actress (born 1986)

- Born: May 24, 1986 (age 40); South Korea
- Occupation: Actress
- Years active: 2007–present

Korean name
- Hangul: 백옥담
- RR: Baek Okdam
- MR: Paek Oktam

Baek Ok-dam (Korean: 백옥담; born May 24, 1986) is a South Korean actress. Her aunt is screenwriter Im Sung-han, and Baek has mostly starred in television dramas that Im has written, including Princess Aurora (2013) and Apgujeong Midnight Sun (2014).

== Television series ==
Year	Title	Role
2007	Opposites Attract	Seo Ah-ga
2011	New Tales of Gisaeng	Dan Gong-joo
2012	Syndrome	Go Ah-reum
2013	Princess Aurora	No Da-ji
2014	Apgujeong Midnight Sun	Yook Seon-ji
2015	The Virtual Bride	Lee Ha-ji
