= The Swordsman (2020 film) =

- Film poster
- Hangul: 검객
- Hanja: 劍客
- RR: Geomgaek
- MR: Kŏmgaek
- Directed by: Choi Jae-hoon
- Written by: Choi Jae-hoon
- Produced by: Park A-hyoung
- Starring: Jang Hyuk; Kim Hyun-soo; Joe Taslim; Jung Man-sik
- Production company: Opus Pictures
- Distributed by: Opus Pictures; Kiwi Media Group
- Release date: September 23, 2020
- Running time: 101 minutes
- Country: South Korea
- Languages: Korean; Manchu
- Box office: $1,516,150

The Swordsman (Korean: 검객; RR: Geomgaek) is a 2020 South Korean period action film directed by Choi Jae-hoon, starring Jang Hyuk as the titular character.

== Plot ==
Tae-yul, the best swordsman in Joseon who serves King Gwanghaegun as his bodyguard, refuses to join a rebellion of the King's top officials, who believe him too weak to lead the nation against foreign invaders. One of the rebellion's leaders, Min Seung-ho, challenges him to a duel, during which Tae-yul's sword shatters and shards of metal pierce his eyes. The King personally stops the duel, declaring he will abdicate the throne, and releases Tae-yul from his service.

Years later, an older Tae-yul now lives with his teenage daughter, Tae-ok. The two live and work as trappers, but Tae-ok is increasingly frustrated with her father's refusal to let her experience life outside of their home in the mountains; Tae-yul retorts the world is far more dangerous than she understands and he only wants to protect her. Tae-yul's injuries have grown worse, and a local monk warns Tae-ok that unless his eyes are treated with special herbs, he will go completely blind in a few days. The monk sends them to the trader Hwa Seon, but Seon reveals the herbs are both too expensive and only available to those with political connections.

The Joseon royal court receives a visit from Gurutai, a relative of the Qing emperor who has enriched himself by enslaving and selling captives taken during the recent Qing invasion of Joseon. With their nation already suffering under the corrupt rule of the Qing, the King and his advisors fear Gurutai will soon force them to hand over their own children as "tributes" to Qing nobles. Lee Mok-yo, a respected member of the court, decides to write a petition to the King to start openly resisting the Qing and their demands. He also makes a request to Seon for help finding a young girl to care for his aging mother; Seon recommends Tae-ok, who is excited both at the prospect of being adopted by a wealthy family and earning the herbs her father needs.

Gurutai's men harass Seon and her workers, and Tae-yul, using only his cane, fights them off when they threaten Tae-ok. That evening, Tae-ok leaves for Lee's estate, where Gurutai and his personal retinue of assassins soon carry out an ambush, killing all of Lee's servants and taking his daughter and Tae-ok as hostages. Tae-yul learns about his daughter's kidnapping when he survives an attempt on his life, then saves Seon from a retaliatory attack by a Qing slaver. He locates the main slave camp used by Gurutai and burns it to the ground after butchering the guards and freeing those held captive inside. A lone survivor agrees to lead him to Gurutai's private compound.

Lee, leading a force of royal guardsmen, tries to rescue his daughter but instead watches helplessly as his men are gunned down by Qing riflemen. Tae-yul shows up and kills not only the entire company of riflemen but Gurutai's assassins as well. He finally collapses from exhaustion, and is rescued by Lee and Seon, who administer the herbs. Seon admits to Tae-yul he will still go blind anyway, at which point he won't be able to fight. With little time remaining, Tae-yul confronts Min, now employed by Gurutai after betraying Lee out of disgust for his self-serving ways.

After a brief duel, Tae-yul forces Min to yield, at which point Gurutai slits his throat for losing. The two men face each other in a final battle, with Gurutai ordering his mistress to hold Tae-ok at knifepoint and a Qing envoy observing the duel. Gurutai initially has the upper hand, but Tae-yul manages to stab his mistress through the neck, saving Tae-ok, before disarming and impaling Gurutai with his sword. The envoy stops his guards from interfering, allowing Tae-ok and the other slaves to go free. Tae-yul embraces his daughter as he slowly goes completely blind.

A flashback reveals Tae-ok is not Tae-yul's biological daughter, but rather the only child of King Gwanghaegun; the King tasked Tae-yul with raising her as his own child so he would have a reason to live. The movie ends with Tae-yul and Tae-ok slowly making their way down the mountain, with Tae-yul declaring he's ready to see the rest of the world.

== Cast ==
=== Main ===
- Jang Hyuk as Tae-yul, Joseon's best swordsman
- Kim Hyun-soo as Tae-ok, Tae-yul's daughter
- Joe Taslim as Gurutai, a member of the Qing imperial family and the master of the Hwangdang slave traders
- Jung Man-sik as Min Seung-ho, Joseon's greatest military official
- Lee Na-kyeong as Hwa Seon, a Joseon trader
- Lee Min-hyuk as Gyeom Sa-bok, young Tae-yul

=== Supporting ===
- Choi Jin-ho as Lee Mok-yo, a Joseon aristocrat who opposes the Qing
- Ji Seung-hyun as Musa, Gurutai's subordinate
- Ji Gun-woo as Hwa Sam
- Gong Sang-a as Jumo
- Shin Jae-hwan as Sashin
- Chun Yung-am as Mukan
- Yoon Seong-hoon as Jo Chung
- Angelina Danilova as Gurutai's European mistress

=== Special appearance ===
- Jang Hyun-sung as King Gwanghaegun

== Production ==
Script reading was held on June 9, 2017, principal photography began on June 15, 2017, and filming wrapped up in September 2017.

== Release ==
The film was originally scheduled to be released on 17 September 2020 in South Korea. However, due to the COVID-19 pandemic in South Korea, its release was postponed by a week to 23 September 2020.

The film has been pre-sold to 55 countries, invited to the 40th Hawaii International Film Festival, as well as selected as the opening film for the 2020 Korean Indonesian Film Festival. It was released in Singapore on 15 October, Taiwan on 16 October, Indonesia on 29 October, Vietnam on 13 November 2020 and Japan on 2 April 2021.

The film also took part in the Glasgow Film Festival 2021 and Sydney Film Festival 2021. In July 2022, it was invited at the 21st New York Asian Film Festival, where it was screened at Lincoln center on July 19.

== Awards and nominations ==
Year	Award	Category	Recipient	Result	Ref.
2021	3rd Chungbuk International Martial Arts and Action Film Festival	Actor Award	Jang Hyuk	Won	
2022	21st New York Asian Film Festival	Daniel A. Craft Award for Excellence in Action Cinema	Jang Hyuk	Won	
