= Sunwoo Jae-duk =

South Korean actor

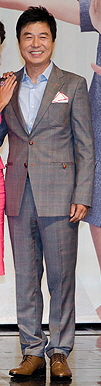
- Sunwoo in 2013
- Born: July 23, 1962 (age 64); Seoul, South Korea
- Education: Seoul Institute of the Arts - Theater and Film
- Occupation: Actor
- Years active: 1982–present
- Agent: Polaris Entertainment
- Children: 3 sons

Korean name
- Hangul: 선우재덕
- Hanja: 鮮于載德
- RR: Seonu Jaedeok
- MR: Sŏnu Chaedŏk

Sunwoo Jae-duk (born July 23, 1962) is a South Korean actor.

== Filmography ==
=== Television series ===
Year	Title	Role
1986	Battle of White Horse	
1987	Land	
1988	Top of the Empire	
1988	500 Years of Joseon: "Memoirs of Lady Hyegyeong"	Jeong Hu-gyeom
1989	Fetters of Love	
1990	Freezing Point	
1990	Earthling	Lee Jong-se
1990	Green Village, Green School	Teacher
1991	The Royal Path	
1991	Lethe's Love Song	
1991	West Wind	Sang-woon
1991	TV's The Art of War	Woo Jae-yong
1991	Keep Your Voice Down	
1991	Drama Game: "Against Longing"	Naval officer Jung-min
1992	TV Literary Theater: "The Snow Falling on Chagall's Village"	Park Yoon-soo
1992	The Woman Who Won 100 Times	
1992	Self-Portrait in Black	Doo-sung
1992	Morning Without Parting	
1993	January	
1994	Women Who Burn the Rice	
1994	The Road to You	
1995	Something Happened at Sunrise	
1995	The Age of Uniqueness	Yeon Su-gyeom
1995	Auntie Ok	Sang-gu
1995	Happy	Choi Young-min
1995	Men of the Bath House	Lee Dae-won
1996	Dangerous Love	Tae-shik
1996	Mom's Flag	
1996	White Dandelion	
1996	First Love	Go Dong-taek
1996	Drama Game: "Winter's Fairytale"	Min-seop
1997	Don't Forget	Park Chan-young
1997	Lady	Geung-jae
1998	See and See Again	Sang-soo
1998	Heart of Lies	Ji Dae-sung
1999	Is Time The Only Thing That Flows?	
2000	Truth	Choi Joon-yup
2000	SWAT Police	Choi Jung-hak
2001	Morning Without Parting	Kwon Chan-young
2002	Sidestreet People	Kang Hyun-woo
2002	Drama City: "Formula for Passion"	Myung-joon
2002	Bad Girls	Byun Jang-soo
2002	Saxophone and Chapssaltteok	Lee Sun-woo
2002	The Maengs' Golden Era	
2002	Trio	Lee Hyun-woo
2003	Damo	King Sukjong
2003	Drama City: "My Beautiful First Love"	Myung-nam
2003	First Love	Go Dong-tak
2003	One Million Roses	Park Tae-ho
2004	Proposal	Jang Jin-woo
2004	Freezing Point	Choi Tae-hoon
2004	Wives on Strike	Park Min-gu
2005	Green Rose	Managing director Seo
2005	Recipe of Love	Oh Young-nam
2005	Wild Flower	Jung Hyun-joon
2006	Love and Ambition	Director Kim
2006	My Love Dal-ja	Ji-hoon
2007	Catching Up with Gangnam Moms	Lee Joon-ho
2007	The King and I	Yoon Gi-gyeon
2008	Aquarius	Seo Young-deul
2008	HDTV Literature: "My Bloody Valentine"	Joo-hyun
2008	Little Mom Scandal	Hong Jung-ho
2009	Again, My Love	Kim Yoo-suk
2009	Can Anyone Love?	Ryu Young-ha
2010	Prosecutor Princess	Go Man-chul
2010	Marry Me, Please	Song In-pyo
2010	Stormy Lovers	Baek Woo-hyun
2011	I Trusted Men	Moon Jin-heon
2011	Heartstrings	Lee Sun-ki
2011	My Daughter the Flower	Yang Soo-chul (guest)
2011	Insu, the Queen Mother	King Munjong
2012	Moon Embracing the Sun	Heo Young-jae
2012	Koisuru Maison ~Rainbow Rose~	Sunwoo Man-shik
2012	KBS TV Novel: "Love, My Love"	Hong Yoon-shik
2012	To the Beautiful You	Kang Geun-wook
2012	May Queen	Yoon Hak-soo
2012	The King's Doctor	King Injo
2013	Wonderful Mama	Lee Beom-seo
2013	Can't Stand Anymore	Hwang Seon-ho
2013	Melody of Love	Park Beom-jin
2014	Naeil's Cantabile	Cha Yoo-jin's uncle (cameo)
2014	Lady of the Storm	Do Joon-tae
2014	S.O.S. (Strawberry On the Shortcake) Save Me	Kim Ji-won
2015	The Return of Hwang Geum-bok	Kim Kyung-soo
2017	Money Flower	Jang Sung-man
2017	Stranger	Ahn Seung-Ho
2018	Through the Waves	Hwang Chang-sik
2019–2020	Unasked Family	Hwang Byung-rae
2020–2021	Royal Secret Agent	Hwi Yong-goon
2021	Oh My Ladylord	Han Min-joon
2021	Red Shoes	Kwon Hyuk-sang
2022	Tracer 2	Employee
2022	Bravo, My Life	Kang In-gyu
2022–2023	The Witch's Game	
2023	The Real Has Come!	Gong Chan-sik
2024	Suji & Uri	Han Jin-tae
2024	Dare to Love Me	Shin Soo-Geun
2024	Love Andante	Minister of Unification (cameo ep.1)
2025	Motel California	Lee Mok-Won (cameo)
2025	Catch Your Luck	Kim Dae-Sik

=== Film ===
Year	Title	Role
1983	Making Love	
1986	Guitarist (short film)	
1988	You Are a Flower	Seung-ho
1991	Love and Tears	
1992	Life Isn't a Multiple Choice Test	
2000	Siren	Kim Hyung-seok
2003	Come Tomorrow	Mi-gi
2009	City of Damnation	Squad leader Park Jong-ki
2013	No Breathing	Jung Woo-sang's father
2015	Northern Limit Line	young Yoon Doo-ho (cameo)

=== Variety show ===
Year	Title	Notes
1998	Emergency 119	Rescue chief
2011	Dancing with the Stars - Season 2	Contestant

== Awards and nominations ==
Year	Award	Category	Nominated work	Result
2001	SBS Drama Awards	Excellence Award, Actor	Morning Without Parting	Won
2003	KBS Drama Awards	Best Supporting Actor	One Million Roses	Won
2012	KBS Drama Awards	Excellence Award, Actor in a Daily Drama	TV Novel: Love, My Love	Nominated
2021	KBS Drama Awards	Excellence Award, Actor in a Daily Drama	Red Shoes	Nominated
