= Sunok =

- Promotional poster
- Hangul: 순옥이
- RR: Sunogi
- MR: Sunogi
- Genre: Family; Drama
- Written by: Hwang Soon-young
- Directed by: Shin Hyun-soo
- Starring: Choi Ja-hye; Hwang Dong-ju; Kang Do-han; Park Hye-yeong; Choi Eun-ju
- Country of origin: South Korea
- Original language: Korean
- No. of episodes: 150

Production
- Producer: Han Chul-kyung
- Running time: 25 min
- Production company: KBS Drama Production

Original release
- Network: KBS1
- Release: November 5, 2006 – April 28, 2007

Sunok (Korean: 순옥이) is a South Korean KBS1 television drama that aired from 8:30–9:30 a.m., as part of the KBS TV Novel series. It stars Choi Ja-hye as Sunok. The series scored average ratings, less than 10%.

== Plot ==
A baby girl who was abandoned at birth grows up to become a woman facing a cruel destiny. Park Sun-ok was born to parents that are too poor to raise her, so they send her to a rich family, who become Sun-ok's stepparents. They care for her as if she were their real daughter. Later, Sun-ok's real father overthrows Sun-ok's stepfather's business and becomes rich himself, leaving Sun-ok's family to starve. However, Sun-ok's real parents find out the truth and go to Sun-ok to ask for forgiveness. At first, Sun-ok refuses, but later she forgives them. In addition, her stepfather's new business of selling antiques becomes successful.

== Cast ==
=== Main ===
- Choi Ja-hye as Park Sun-ok
- Hwang Dong-ju as Seo In-ho
- Kang Do-han as Jeong Yong-chil
- Park Hye-yeong as Jeong Mi-jo
- Choi Eun-ju as Nam Ki-sun

=== Supporting ===
==== Park Family ====
- Han Jin-hee as Park Chung-gil (father)
- Nam Yoon-jung as Yoon Jeong-hye (mother)
- Yoo Seung-bong as Yoon Byung-jo (Jeong-hye's brother)
- Kim Hyung-ja as Kim Haeng-ja (Chung-gil's cousin)

==== Jeong Family ====
- Song Ki-yoon as Jeong Ho-tae (father)
- Park Joon-geum as Im Yae-bum (mother)

==== Nam Family ====
- Kim Hyun-kyoon as Nam Ki-sup (Ki-sun's brother)

==== Others ====
- Kwon Ki-sun as Jo Mak-shim
- Ahn Suk-hwan as Chang-soo
- Kim Young-bae as Kim Yeong-ae
- Kim Soo-yun as Choi Jin-shim (Yeong-bae's wife)
- Maeng Ho-im as Seo In-ho's father
- Son Young-soon

== Ratings ==
"Sunok"'s ratings were quite low and it turned out to be 7.5% average.
