= Kwak Hee-sung =

South Korean actor and musician

- Born: 18 April 1990 (age 36); South Korea
- Education: Chung-Ang University – French Language and Literature
- Occupations: Actor; musician
- Years active: 2012–present
- Agent: Raemong Raein

Korean name
- Hangul: 곽희성
- Hanja: 郭熙聖
- RR: Gwak Huiseong
- MR: Kwak Hŭisŏng

Kwak Hee-sung is a South Korean actor and musician. He made his acting debut in 2012 with the cable series Korean Peninsula. Kwak is also the vocalist and bassist of the rock band E.D.E.N. (Every Day Every Night).

== Filmography ==
=== Film ===
Year	Title	Role
2020	Faceless Boss	Kwak Sang-goo

=== Television series ===
Year	Title	Role
2012	Korean Peninsula	Min Dong-ki
2013	Ad Genius Lee Tae-baek	Ma Yi-chan
2013	KBS Drama Special "Neighborhood Watch"	Kim Jin-hyuk
2013	Goddess of Marriage	Pil-ho
2013	Melody of Love	Yoon Sang-hyun
2014	Secret Door	Kim Mu
2015	Hyde Jekyll, Me	Sung Seok-won
2015	The Virtual Bride	Cha Dong-seok
2015-2016	The Dearest Lady	Baek Gang-Ho
2017	My Sassy Girl	Park Chang-whi
2017	Single Wife	Hwang Jae-Min
2017	KBS Drama Special "You're Closer Than I Think"	Ha Do-Young

== Discography ==
=== Soundtrack appearances ===
Year	Artist	Song title	Notes
2013	E.D.E.N.	"Never Cry"	From Ad Genius Lee Tae-baek OST
2014	E.D.E.N.	"One Love"	From You're All Surrounded OST
2014	E.D.E.N.	"A New Hope"	From Diary of a Night Watchman OST
2014	E.D.E.N.	"Come to Me"	From Diary of a Night Watchman OST
2017	Kwak Hee-sung	"그대와 함께 (Special Track)"	From Single Wife OST
