= Sign (TV series) =

2011 South Korean television series

- Promotional poster
- Genre: Romance; Crime; Action
- Written by: Jang Hang-jun; Kim Eun-hee
- Directed by: Jang Hang-jun
- Starring: Park Shin-yang; Kim Ah-joong; Jun Kwang-ryul; Jung Gyu-woon; Uhm Ji-won
- Composers: Yang Jeong-woo; Kim Soo-jin
- Country of origin: South Korea
- Original language: Korean
- No. of episodes: 20

Production
- Executive producers: Choi Moon-suk; Kim Yong-hoon; Lee Mi-ji
- Producer: Park Ji-eun
- Production companies: Apollo Pictures; Golden Thumb

Original release
- Network: SBS TV
- Release: January 5 – March 10, 2011

Sign (Korean: 싸인) is 2011 South Korean television series, starring Park Shin-yang, Kim Ah-joong, Jun Kwang-ryul, Jung Gyu-woon and Uhm Ji-won. It is about the life of forensic doctors. It aired on SBS TV from January 6 to March 10, 2011 on Wednesdays and Thursdays at 21:55 for 20 episodes.

== Synopsis ==
The story details the partnership between Go Da-kyung (Kim Ah-joong), a warm-hearted rookie and Yoon Ji-hoon (Park Shin-yang), a high-tempered forensic doctor, who find themselves an unlikely pair for solving cases.

== Cast ==
- Park Shin-yang as Yoon Ji-hoon
- Kim Ah-joong as Go Da-kyung
- Uhm Ji-won as Jung Woo-jin
- Jung Gyu-woon as Choi Yi-han
- Jun Kwang-ryul as Lee Myung-han
- Song Jae-ho as Jung Byung-do
- Jang Hyun-sung as Jang Min-suk
- Ahn Moon-sook as Hong Sook-joo
- Jung Eun-pyo as Kim Wan-tae
- Im Ho-gul as Jang Jae-young
- Moon Chun-shik as Ahn Sung-jin
- Kwon Byung-gil as Goo Sung-tae
- Lee Jung-hun as Joo In-hyuk
- Kim Kyung-bum as Park Tae-gyu
- Jung Seung-ho as Go Kang-shik
- Kim Young-sun as Jung Eun-mo
- Hwang Sun-hee as Kang Seo-yeon
- Park Young-ji as Kang Joon-hyuk
- Kim Eung-soo as Chief prosecutor Choi Jung-seop
- Yoo Se-rye as Mi-young
- Park Geon-il as Seo Yoon-hyung
- Kim Han-joon as Kang Yong-hwa
- Oh Hyun-chul as Woo Jae-won
- Supernova as VOICE (cameo)
- Jung Yoon-hak as Boy Band "VOICE" member
- Jung Ji-yoon as Secretary for lead prosecutor
- Choi Jae-hwan as Ahn Soo-hyun (ep 4-7)
- Han Bo-bae as Aki-chan (ep 8)
- Kim Sung-won as school principal (ep 8)
- Kim Jung-tae as Jung Cha-young (ep 11-13)
- Baek Seung-hyeon as Lee Chul-won (ep 12-13)
- Jung Da-bin as Da-bin (ep 13-14)
- Kim Dan-yool as village kid (ep 13-14)
- Yoon Joo-sang as Jung Moon-soo (cameo)
- Kim Sung-oh as Lee Ho-jin (cameo, ep 15-19)
- Kim Min-kyo as policeperson (cameo, ep 1)
- Maxine Koo as Chinese CBC reporter (cameo)
- Jang Hang-jun as side table guest (cameo)
- Yang Taek-jo (cameo)
- Jung Mi-jung
- Im Seung-dae

== Awards and nominations ==
Year	Award	Category	Recipient	Result
2011	47th Baeksang Arts Awards	Best Actress	Kim Ah-joong	Nominated
2011	4th Korea Drama Awards	Grand Prize (Daesang)	Sign	Nominated
2011	4th Korea Drama Awards	Best New Actress	Hwang Sun-hee	Nominated
2011	19th SBS Drama Awards	Top Excellence Award, Actor in a Drama Special	Park Shin-yang	Nominated
2011	19th SBS Drama Awards	Top Excellence Award, Actress in a Drama Special	Kim Ah-joong	Nominated
2011	19th SBS Drama Awards	Top Excellence Award, Actress in a Drama Special	Uhm Ji-won	Nominated
2011	19th SBS Drama Awards	Excellence Award, Actor in a Drama Special	Jung Gyu-woon	Won
2011	19th SBS Drama Awards	Special Acting Award, Actress in a Drama Special	Hwang Sun-hee	Nominated

== Japanese remake ==
A Japanese remake titled Sign: Houigakusha Yuzuki Takashi no Jiken (サイン―法医学者 柚木貴志の事件―) will air on TV Asahi in July 2019. It is produced by Total Media Communication.
