= The Killer: A Girl Who Deserves to Die =

The Killer
- Hangul: 더 킬러: 죽어도 되는 아이
- RR: Deo killeo: jugeodo doeneun ai
- MR: Tŏ k'illŏ: chugŏdo toenŭn ai
- Directed by: Choi Jae-hoon
- Written by: Shin Dong-chul, Nam Ji-woong
- Based on: The Kid Deserves to Die by Bang Jin-ho
- Produced by: Nam Ji-woong, Mark W. Shaw
- Starring: Jang Hyuk
- Cinematography: Lee Yong-gab
- Edited by: Kim Man-geun
- Music by: Jung Hyun-soo
- Production companies: Ascendio Entertainment; Cinemaro Entertainment
- Distributed by: (South Korea) iHQ, Film 6 (Note: A subsidiary of iHQ), The Contents On (Note: Digital and VOD only) (United States) Wide Lens Pictures, Shaw Entertainment Group (United Kingdom) Trinity CineAsia (United Arab Emirates) VOX Cinemas (Note: Also in the Middle East) (Russia) Volga Film (Note: Also in CIS) (Italy) Blue Swan Entertainment (Japan) The KlockWorx (Hong Kong) Clover Films (Note: Also in Southeast Asia) (Taiwan) MovieCloud (Germany) Splendid Medien (Note: Also in other German-speaking territories) (Singapore) Golden Village
- Release dates: April 23, 2022 (Far East Film Festival); July 13, 2022 (South Korea); July 13, 2022 (USA)
- Running time: 95 minutes
- Country: South Korea
- Language: Korean

The Killer, also known as The Killer: A Girl Who Deserves to Die (Korean: 더 킬러: 죽어도 되는 아이) is a 2022 South Korean action thriller film directed by Choi Jae-hoon, starring Jang Hyuk as the titular character. It is adapted from a popular novel The Kid Deserves to Die written by Bang Jin-ho.

== Plot ==
Bang Ui-gang is a retired assassin who has settled down with his wife, Hyeon-soo. One day, Hyeon-soo tells Ui-gang that she is going on a holiday in Jeju together with her best friend, and requests that he take care of 17-year-old Kim Yoon-ji, the daughter of her best friend. Though reluctant at first, Ui-gang eventually gives in. After sending Hyeon-soo and Yoon-ji's stepmother off in the day, Ui-gang fetches Yoon-ji to Hongdae at night, and goes home after telling her to stay at her friend's house for a few days. Later at home, he gets awakened by Yoon-ji's call asking for help because her stomach hurts and immediately goes to find her, only to realise later that she faked being sick to get him to come pick her up. However, after Yoon-ji gets a text message, she tells Ui-gang to go home first.

Ui-gang heads home and drives away even though he looks back to see Yoon-ji riding away on a bike with several others. After receiving a text from his wife asking how Yoon-ji is doing, Ui-gang decides to turn back to find her, managing to track her eventual location through a tracking device, which he placed in her wallet earlier. Finding her being threatened by several delinquents, led by Sung-yeon, Ui-gang beats them up and brings Yoon-ji back home. The next night, Ui-gang and Yoon-ji are on the way back home, passing by the same place where he beat up the delinquents. He is stopped by Detective Lee Young-ho, who tells him that there is a murder case in the venue, and then lets him drive off.

The next morning, Detective Lee visits Ui-gang, suspecting him of being a part of the murder, and telling him about Yoon-ji's situation. Ui-gang understands her situation as he recalls a flashback which showed him and a teenage girl who wanted to kill herself. Sung-yeon calls Yoon-ji and Ui-gang intercepts the call, where he agrees to meet up, as Sung-yeon has the knife used in the murders, and that knife has Ui-gang's fingerprints. Though Sung-yeon tell Ui-gang to call her when he reaches a certain location, he is able to track her down because she has Yoon-ji's wallet (with the tracker still inside). Ui-gang escapes with the knife after fighting a Russian killer named Yuri, who is also trained in the Spetsnaz. He returns home, only to find Yoon-ji has been kidnapped.

Ui-gang tracks Sung-yeon to an apartment and mortally wounds her after seeking information from her about a human trafficking ring that also involves the Russian mafia, and about someone who has specifically requested Yoon-ji. He visits a hotel linked to the ring, kills numerous delinquents and escapes from Yuri, who earlier told him where Yoon-ji is. Detective Lee had arrived on the location to arrest Ui-gang, but Ui-gang overpowers him and drives with him to where he was told Yoon-ji was. After saving her, Ui-gang learns that Detective Lee is a corrupt police officer who worked for the organization Ui-gang has been attacking. Detective Lee learns that Yoon-ji was to be delivered to Park Hyung-joo. Ui-gang visits Park and learns that an unknown, high-ranking judge had specifically requested Yoon-ji. He also learns of an individual named Pig Mama who appears to be Park's boss.

Ui-gang asks Detective Lee to research both the judge and Yoon-ji. He learns Yoon-ji's mother is actually her stepmother, and also the identity of the judge. He proceeds to the judge's mansion, killing several bodyguards, but is betrayed by Detective Lee. Ui-gang is turned over to the judge, who is actually Judge Kim, next in line to become the Chief Justice of the Supreme Court of Korea. Judge Kim asks Detective Lee to kill Ui-gang, but the latter breaks free, killing Detective Lee and Yuri. Having killed all the bodyguards, Ui-gang kills Judge Kim after finding out that Pig Mama is Yoon-ji's stepmother, currently on holiday with Hyeon-soo. He heads to Jeju and kills Pig Mama in the outskirts. Together with Yoon-ji, Ui-gang finds Hyeon-soo at a beach in Jeju, where it is revealed that the teenage girl in Ui-gang's flashback was Hyeon-soo.

== Cast ==
- Jang Hyuk as Bang Ui-gang, a retired professional killer
- Lee Seo-young (Anne from GWSN) as Kim Yoon-ji, a high school girl
- Bruce Khan as Yuri, a Russian killer
- Bang Eun-jung as Sung-yeon, a girl involved in sex trafficking
- Shin Seung-hwan as Park Hyung-joo, a criminal gang member
- Lee Seung-joon as Lee Young-ho, a detective
- Lee Chae-young as Hyeon-soo, Bang Ui-gang's wife
- Choi Ki-sub as Dotwok, a criminal gang member
- Yoo Seo-jin as Yoon-ji's step-mother/Pig Mama
- Hong Seo-joon as Judge Kim
- Son Hyun-joo as a gun seller (cameo)
- Cha Tae-hyun as a trauma cleaner (cameo)

== Production ==
Principal photography began on June 25, 2021, and filming wrapped up in October 2021.

== Release ==
The film made its world premiere at the 24th Udine Far East Film Festival on 23 April 2022. It was pre-sold to 48 foreign countries and territories, including major countries in Europe and Asia. It held a red carpet premiere at the historical Regency Village Theatre in Los Angeles on 20 June 2022, and was released in the theatres simultaneously in North America (by Wide Lens Pictures and Shaw Entertainment Group) and South Korea (by iHQ and its subsidiary Film 6) on 13 July 2022.

The film had a special screening at the 21st New York Asian Film Festival on 19 July 2022, as well as the Fantasia International Film Festival on 2 Aug 2022. It was also released in Singapore (by Clover Films and Golden Village Pictures) on 21 July, Taiwan (by MovieCloud) on 22 July, Malaysia (by Clover Films) on 28 July, Vietnam (by Clover Films) on 5 August, Saudi Arabia, UAE, Bahrain (by VOX Cinemas) on 11 August 2022 and Japan (by The KlockWorx) on 26 May 2023.

== Awards and nominations ==
Award	Date of ceremony	Category	Recipient(s)	Result	Ref(s)
21st New York Asian Film Festival	19 July 2022	Daniel A. Craft Award for Excellence in Action Cinema	Jang Hyuk	Won	
