= Love, My Love =

- Promotional poster
- Also known as: Dear Love
- Genre: Drama, Romance, Family
- Written by: Jung Hyun-min; Son Ji-hye
- Directed by: Lee Duk-gun
- Starring: Hwang Sun-hee; Song Min-jung; Oh Chang-seok; Kim San-ho
- Country of origin: South Korea
- Original language: Korean
- No. of episodes: 175

Production
- Executive producer: Kim Sung-geun
- Running time: Mondays to Fridays at 09:00 (KST)

Original release
- Network: KBS2
- Release: May 7, 2012 – January 4, 2013

Love, My Love (Korean: 사랑아 사랑아; RR: Saranga saranga) is a 2012 South Korean television series starring Hwang Sun-hee, Song Min-jung, Oh Chang-seok and Kim San-ho. The morning soap opera aired on KBS2 on May 7, 2012 to January 4, 2013 from Mondays to Fridays at 09:00 for 175 episodes. It is a part of the television program KBS TV Novel.

== Cast ==
=== Main characters ===
- Hwang Sun-hee as Hong Seung-hee
- Song Min-jung as Hong Seung-ah
- Oh Chang-seok as Park No-kyung
- Kim San-ho as Kang Tae-bum

=== Supporting characters ===
Damiul family

- Kim Young-ok as Lee Geum-nyeo (grandmother)
- Sunwoo Jae-duk as Hong Yoon-shik (father)
- Kim Ye-ryeong as Kim Yang-ja (mother)
- Kim Hyo-won as Lee Geum-dong (uncle)
- Kim Joo-yeob as Hong Seung-goo (son)
- Kwon Oh-hyun as Kim Chun-bong

Saekohreum family

- Lee Il-hwa as Choi Myung-joo
- Kim Suk-ok as Mrs. Yoo
- Han Min-chae as Kim Yang
- Lee Ji-eun as Bang Gob-dan
- Jung Seung-ho as Shim Sang-chul
- Kim Joo-hyun as Shim Yun-ho

Hope Hospital family

- Kim Kyu-chul as Yeo Sam-choo
- Kim Bo-mi as Kim Mal-nyeon
- Kang Min-ah as Yeo Eui-joo
- Jang Da-kyung as Choi Min-young

== Awards ==
- 2012 KBS Drama Awards: Excellence Award, Actress in a Daily Drama - Kim Ye-ryeong
- 2012 20th Korean Culture and Entertainment Awards: Best New Actor in a TV Drama - Oh Chang-seok

== See also ==
- Korean Broadcasting System
