= Yoo Ho-jeong =

South Korean actress (born 1969)

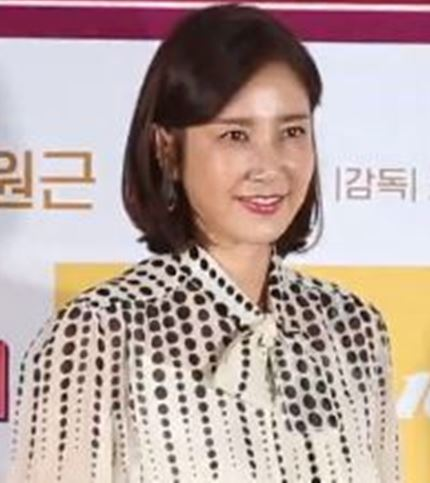
- Yoo in January 2019
- Born: January 24, 1969 (age 57); Seoul, South Korea
- Education: Seoul Art College - Film Studies
- Occupation: Actress
- Years active: 1991–present
- Agent: SM Entertainment
- Spouse: Lee Jae-ryong (m. 1995)
- Children: 2

Korean name
- Hangul: 유호정
- Hanja: 柳好貞
- RR: Yu Hojeong
- MR: Yu Hojŏng

Yoo Ho-jeong (Korean: 유호정; born January 24, 1969) is a South Korean actress. She made her acting debut in 1991 and has been starring in television and film since. Roles include a divorcee whose husband lives next door in daily drama Definitely Neighbors (2010), and the grown-up protagonist in box office hit Sunny (2011).

In 2013, Yoo became the host of her first ever variety show, the healthy food and lifestyle program Olive Show on cable channel O'live TV.

== Filmography ==
=== Television series ===
| Year | Title | Role |
|---|---|---|
| 1991 | Humble Men | Seo Chan-kyung |
| 1991 | Our Paradise | Jae-eun |
| 1991 | Keep Your Voice Down | Ok-yi |
| 1992 | Yesterday's Green Grass | Da-hye |
| 1993 | To Live | Eun-pyo |
| 1993 | Marriage | Na Chae-young |
| 1994 | MBC Best Theater: "Two Women" | |
| 1994 | Farewell | Kang Yoo-rim |
| 1994 | From June to August | Yoon Hae-yeon |
| 1995 | Even If the Wind Blows | Kyung-joo |
| 1996 | Milky Way | Young-hee |
| 1996 | The Scent of Apple Blossoms | Seo Young-ae |
| 1996 | Drama Game: "Deep Sea" | Passenger waiting for the airplane (cameo) |
| 1997 | Drama City: "Still Time to Love" | Lee Jung-woo |
| 1997 | Into the Storm | Hae-joo |
| 1997 | Light in the Field | Park Soo-jin |
| 1997 | The Woman Next Door | Lee Jung-in |
| 1998 | Lie | Jung Eun-soo |
| 1998 | Angel's Kiss | Han Seol-hwa |
| 1999 | Trap of Youth | Noh Young-joo |
| 1999 | Rising Sun, Rising Moon | Park Young-joo |
| 2002 | Man of the Sun, Lee Je-ma | Woon-young |
| 2003 | Women Next Door | Yoon Mi-yeon |
| 2003 | Rosemary | Lee Jung-yeon |
| 2006 | Thank You, My Life | Han Yeon-kyung |
| 2006 | Outrageous Women | Song Mi-joo |
| 2007 | Kimcheed Radish Cubes | Yoo Eun-ho |
| 2009 | Can Anyone Love | Oh Seol-ran |
| 2010 | Definitely Neighbors | Yoon Ji-young |
| 2011 | The Garden of Heaven | Jung Jae-in |
| 2013 | A Little Love Never Hurts | Jung Yoo-jin |
| 2015 | Heard It Through the Grapevine | Choi Yeon-hee |

=== Film ===
| Year | Title | Role |
|---|---|---|
| 1998 | First Kiss | Jajangmyeon actress (cameo) |
| 2000 | Promenade | Young-hoon's first love (cameo) |
| 2002 | Chihwaseon | Mae-hyang |
| 2006 | I'm a Cyborg, But That's OK | Il-soon's mother |
| 2011 | Sunny | Im Na-mi |
| 2014 | Awaiting (short film) | Sa-ra |
| 2019 | Rosebud | Hong Jang-mi |

=== Variety show ===
| Year | Title | Notes |
|---|---|---|
| 2013 | Olive Show | Host |
| 2014 | The Return of Superman | Narration |

== Bibliography ==
| Year | Title | Publisher |
|---|---|---|
| 2000 | The Story of Yoo Ho-jeong's Happy Home | Seoul Media Group |

== Awards and nominations ==
| Year | Award | Category | Nominated work | Result |
|---|---|---|---|---|
| 1993 | 29th Baeksang Arts Awards | Best New Actress – Television | Yesterday's Green Grass | Won |
| 2002 | 15th Grimae Awards | Best Actress | Man of the Sun, Lee Je-ma | Won |
| 2003 | KBS Drama Awards | Top Excellence Award, Actress | Rosemary | Won |
| 2003 | KBS Drama Awards | Best Couple Award with Kim Seung-woo | Rosemary | Won |
| 2009 | 8th Korea National Council on Social Welfare | Commendation from the Ministry of Health, Welfare, and Family Affairs | —N/a | Won |
| 2010 | SBS Drama Awards | Top Excellence Award, Actress in a Weekend/Daily Drama | Definitely Neighbors | Won |
| 2015 | 4th APAN Star Awards | Top Excellence Award, Actress in a Serial Drama | Heard It Through the Grapevine | Nominated |
