= Choi Ja-hye =

South Korean actress (born 1981)

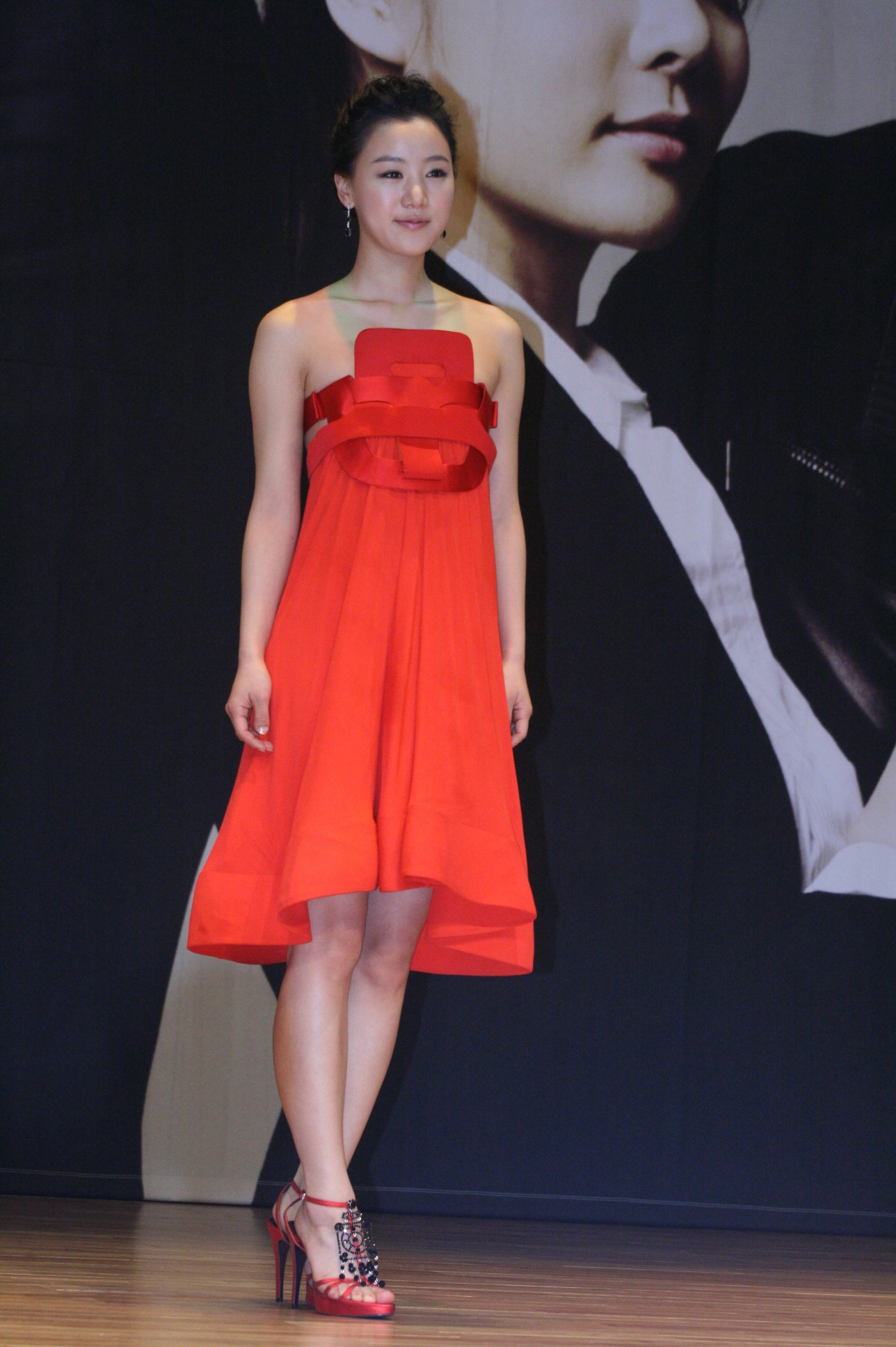
- Choi in 2008
- Born: July 26, 1981 (age 45); Seoul, South Korea
- Education: Seoul Institute of the Arts - Broadcasting and Entertainment
- Occupation: Actress
- Years active: 2001–present
- Spouse: Unknown (m. 2010)

Korean name
- Hangul: 최자혜
- Hanja: 崔慈惠
- RR: Choe Jahye
- MR: Ch'oe Chahye

Choi Ja-hye (Korean: 최자혜; born July 26, 1981) is a South Korean actress. She is best known for starring in the television drama Bread, Love and Dreams (2010).

== Filmography ==
=== Television series ===
| Year | Title | Role |
|---|---|---|
| 2001 | Honey Honey | |
| 2001 | Every Day with You | |
| 2002 | My Name Is Princess | |
| 2002 | Reservation for Love | Hwang Yoo-mi |
| 2002 | Since We Met | Song-hwa |
| 2003 | MBC Best Theater "Man Over Money" | |
| 2003 | Forever Love | Mi-sun |
| 2003 | While You Were Dreaming | |
| 2003 | MBC Best Theater "Lee Eun-sung, Hong Se-jin" | |
| 2003 | Women Next Door | |
| 2003 | Jewel in the Palace | Chang-ee |
| 2004 | Dal-rae's House | Kim Ja-hye |
| 2005 | Be Strong, Geum-soon! | Na Geum-ah |
| 2005 | TV Literature "The Post Horse Curse" | Gye-yeon |
| 2005 | Drama City "Gopo Inn" | Woo-shim |
| 2006 | Spring Waltz | Hong Mi-jung |
| 2006 | Fugitive Lee Doo-yong | Hwang Yoon-hee |
| 2006 | Sunok | Park Sunok |
| 2007 | Lobbyist | Karen/Kim Soo-ji |
| 2008 | Formidable Rivals | Jung Yoo-min |
| 2010 | Jejungwon | Naoko |
| 2010 | Bread, Love and Dreams | Gu Ja-kyung |
| 2010 | It's Okay, Daddy's Girl | Seo Hee-jae |
| 2011 | Drama Special "The Sound of My Wife Breathing" | Kim Seol-ah |
| 2020 | Birthcare Center | Jeon Yoo-rim |
| 2020 | Get Revenge | Announcer |
| 2023 | The Real Has Come! | Gong Ji-myeong |

=== Variety show ===
| Year | Title | Notes |
|---|---|---|
| 2004 | Sports World | Host |

=== Music video appearances ===
| Year | Song title | Artist |
|---|---|---|
| 2004 | "When That Day Comes" | Shin Seung-hun |
| 2009 | "Tell Me Why" | Untouchable |
