= The Other Side of the Moon (EP) =

- Digital cover

EP by GWSN
- Released: May 26, 2021
- Length: 19:45
- Language: Korean; English
- Label: The Wave Music; Sony Korea

GWSN chronology
The Keys (2020)	The Other Side of the Moon (2021)

Singles from The Other Side of the Moon
- 1. "Like It Hot" Released: May 26, 2021

The Other Side of the Moon is the fifth extended play (EP) by South Korean girl group GWSN, released by the Wave Music on May 26, 2021. The EP features six tracks, with the lead single "Like It Hot".

== Background ==
On April 29, 2021, the Wave Music officially announced that GWSN would be releasing their fifth extended play entitled The Other Side of the Moon, including the lead single "Like It Hot", set to release on May 20, 2021. The release date was later delayed to May 26, 2021. On May 16, 2021, the first teaser for "Like It Hot" was revealed via YouTube. On May 23, 2021, the highlight medley of the extended play was revealed via YouTube. On May 24, 2021, the second teaser for "Like It Hot" was revealed via YouTube. On May 26, 2021, the extended play was released featuring the lead single "Like It Hot".

== Track listing ==
The Other Side of the Moon track listing
No.	Title	Lyrics	Music	Arrangement	Length
1.	"Burn" (song by Miya, Seoryoung, Anne, Lena)	Swin Lee; Ruddie Miller	Lee; Oneul	Oneul; Lee	2:28
2.	"I Can't Breathe"	Seoryoung; Lena; Lee	Lee; Oneul	Oneul; Lee	3:39
3.	"Like It Hot"	Znee; Swin Lee	Ryan S. Jhun; Scott Russell Stoddart; Betsa Collins	Jhun; Stoddart	3:22
4.	"E I E I O"	Seoro; Lee	Lee; Oneul	Oneul; Lee	3:17
5.	"Starry Night"	Seoryoung; Lena; Lee	Lee	Lee	3:43
6.	"I Sing (Lalala)"	Nody Cika; Lee; Lena	Nody Cika; Klozer	Klozer	3:14

== Charts ==
=== Weekly charts ===
Weekly chart performance for The Other Side of the Moon
Chart (2021)	Peak position
South Korean Albums (Circle)	18

=== Monthly charts ===
Monthly chart performance for The Other Side of the Moon
Chart (2021)	Position
South Korean Albums (Circle)	66

== Release history ==
The Other Side of the Moon release history
Region	Date	Format	Label
South Korea	May 26, 2021	CD; digital download; streaming	The Wave Music; Sony Music Korea
Various	May 26, 2021	Digital download; streaming	The Wave Music; Sony Music Korea
