= Hwang Sun-hee =

South Korean actress (born 1986)

- Born: August 15, 1986 (age 40); South Korea
- Education: Sangmyung University – Theatre and Film
- Occupation: Actress
- Years active: 2008–present
- Agents: Pratin TPC; SidusHQ

Korean name
- Hangul: 황선희
- RR: Hwang Seonhui
- MR: Hwang Sŏnhŭi

Hwang Sun-hee (Korean: 황선희; born August 15, 1986) is a South Korean actress.

== Career ==
After supporting roles in the miniseries Sign, City Hunter and Wild Romance, she played her first leading role in the daily drama Love, My Love.

In May 2022, Hwang signed with new agency SidusHQ.

== Filmography ==
=== Film ===
Year	Title	Role	Ref.
2015	Man and Wife		
2018	The Pension	So Yi	
2022	Confession		

=== Television series ===
Year	Title	Role	Notes	Ref.
2010	It's Okay, Daddy's Girl	Ma Ri-sol		
2011	Sign	Kang Seo-yeon		
2011	City Hunter	Jin Se-hee		
2012	Wild Romance	Oh Soo-young		
2012–2013	Love, My Love	Hong Seung-hee		
2013	A Hundred Year Legacy	Eun-sul	Cameo	
2013	Master's Sun	Hanna Brown / Cha Hee-joo	Cameo (Ep. 11)	
2013–2014	Melody of Love	Kong Soo-im		
2015	The Man in the Mask	Seo Ri-na		
2016	One More Happy Ending	Woo Yeon-soo		
2017	Spring Again	Choi Bo-ra		
2018	Lovely Horribly	Kim Ra-yeon		
2018–2019	My Healing Love	Lee Sam-sook		
2019	Psychopath Diary	Jo Yoo-jin		

== Theatre ==
Year	Title	Role	Ref.
2008	Radio Star	Flower Shop Girl	

== Awards and nominations ==
Name of the award ceremony, year presented, category, nominee of the award, and the result of the nomination
Award ceremony	Year	Category	Nominee / Work	Result	Ref.
KBS Drama Awards	2012	Best New Actress	Love, My Love & Wild Romance	Nominated	
Korea Drama Awards	2011	Best New Actress	City Hunter & Sign	Nominated	
SBS Drama Awards	2011	Special Acting Award, Actress in a Drama Special	Sign	Nominated	
