= Nam Myeong-ryeol =

South Korean actor

- Born: May 14, 1959 (age 67); Daejeon, South Korea
- Education: Bachelor of Forestry, Chungnam National University; Master's degree in Performing Arts, Graduate School of Culture and Arts Contents, Sejong University
- Occupation: Actor
- Years active: 1978–present
- Agent: SY Entertainment
- Children: 2

Korean name
- Hangul: 남명렬
- Hanja: 南明烈
- RR: Nam Myeongryeol
- MR: Nam Myŏngnyŏl

Nam Myeong-ryeol (Korean: 남명렬, born May 14, 1959) is a highly regarded South Korean actor in the fields of film, theater, and television. He embarked on his stage career in 1978 and has since made notable appearances in various Korean theatrical productions, films, and TV shows.

Nam has established himself as a prominent figure in the South Korean theater industry and has received numerous prestigious awards throughout his career. In 2014, he was honored with the acting award at the 50th Dong-A Theater Awards for his outstanding performance in the play "Alibi Chronicles." Additionally, in the 2020 South Korean Culture Day, Nam was granted a presidential commendation in the Korean Culture and Arts Award by Ministry of Culture, Sports and Tourism.

In 2022, Nam Myung-ryeol, renowned for his involvement in over 140 plays spanning over 30 years, was selected as the recipient of the 32nd Lee Hae-rang Theater Award, a significant recognition in the Korean theater landscape. Among his most memorable works in his acting career are "Mask of Fire - Form of Power," "Birds Calling My Name," "Journey with Edipus," and "Alibi Chronicles." He is widely regarded as strong pillar that firmly protects the theater world.

== Early years and education ==
Nam Myeong-ryeol was born on May 14, 1959, in Daejeon as the second child among four siblings. He has an older sister, as well as a younger brother and sister. He grew up in Daejeon and graduated from Daejeon Elementary School, Dongmyeong Middle School, and Bomoon High School. His acceptance into the Agricultural Department at Chungnam National University was solely determined by his academic performance. During his freshman year at university in 1978, Nam had his first experience of watching a play. It was a theater class performance called 'Hwando and Reese' at his university. Intrigued by the production, he joined the theater team shortly thereafter, driven by a simple curiosity and the belief that it would be an enjoyable endeavor.

He perform in February of the following year. It was a 4th grade graduation performance. During his fourth year of university, Nam adapted Lee Mun-yeol's 'Son of a Man' and submitted it to the National University Theater Festival. He portrayed the main character, Min Yo-seop, and the play achieved a notable level of quality for a Korean production. Renowned judges, such as Yoo Min-young and the late Cha Beom-seok, attended the regional screening of the College Theater Festival. The performance gained attention and was even broadcast on MBC in Daejeon. A local theater company filmed and edited the graduation performance to create a special program for broadcast.

== Career ==
=== Debut works ===
Right after graduating from college in 1985, Nam appeared in playwright Jeong Ha-yeon's play Water Bird, Water Bird at Dongin Theater in Daejeon. In the same year in spring, he applied to Ildong Pharmaceutical and was hired in the sales department. He spent five years working in Daejeon and his final year was in Seoul. During his time in Daejeon, he also worked in a theater company two years after become sales. He even created an 'actor study group' with his friends and later founded his own theater company called 'Geumgang', where he served as its representative for two years.

In 1991, Nam quit his job as a salesperson at a pharmaceutical company after working for six years. Nam admitted that his decision was quite reckless because he was married with two kids. He didn't quit his sales job to do theater, but he searched for something fun, and the conclusion he arrived at was theater.

His first play as a full-time actor was a reprisal of his role in 'Son of Man' in 1991. In 1992, he was cast as a guest performer in a theater company other than his own, in an experimental play called 'Mask of Fire' that portrayed the immorality and futility of power. At the time, the head of the theater company and director, Chae Yoon-il, knew each other well and asked Nam if he would be interested in performing the play in Seoul. Despite not being able to offer any guarantees or cover lodging costs, Chae Yoon-il liked Nam's work and hoped to work with him in Seoul. Nam saw this as an opportunity to advance his career and eagerly accepted. He moved permanently to Seoul when he turned 35 in Korean age, and his debut in Seoul with 'Mask of Fire' was a turning point for him.

Encountering the next work 'Birds Cry Calling My Name' marked a pivotal moment for Nam to pursue his artistic career in Seoul.

In 1995 Nam did Kim A-ra's play Journey with Oedipus. Nam portrayed the character Jocasta, who was the mother of Oedipus and later became his wife. This role helped him establish himself as a theater actor in Daehangno and brought him fame. It was the first play for which he received a fan letter, which he fondly remembers with a smile. Nam mentioned that this work made him aware of the infinite possibilities of theater.

In 1996, Nam performed with Park Ji-il in play Sad Song of Sorrow. This work dramatised Jeong Chan's Dongin Literary Award-winning novel.

Park Ji-il is a young man from the airborne unit who works as a theatre actor in Poland, 'Park Un-hyung', and Nam Myung-ryeol appears as a reporter and novelist 'Yoo Sung-gyun' who arrived in Poland to interview musician Henrik Kuretsky.

=== Big screen debut ===
In 1997, Nam made his debut in Chungmuro with minor roles in 'Ji Sang Manga' and 'One Eight Eight Arms'. The following year, he had a small role in director Im Sang-soo's debut film 'Girls' Dinner', and also his first supporting role in director Kang Je-gyu's 'Shiri' (1998). In recent years, he has been more prominent in the film industry. He played a supporting role in 'The Whistleblower' (2014), and in 2016, he took on his first lead role in the low-budget independent film 'My House', which was invited to the 17th Jeonju International Film Festival's Cinemascape Division. Over the past year, he has appeared in significant supporting roles in 'The King', 'Silence', 'Memorial Night', and this year's 'The Detective: Returns'. He has also been more active in dramas lately. Despite being a well-known actor in the theater world, he seems to be focusing on supporting roles in movies without any sense of despair. Based on his recent performances, it appears that he is content with his current trajectory.

It took several years for him to gain recognition as an actor. The early 2000s were a particularly unstable time for him. Financial difficulties and the mental stress of wondering whether he would be able to perform on stage added to his anxiety. Despite the challenges, he persevered and continued to make choices as an actor, knowing that there was always the possibility of losing his relevance in the industry.

In 2012, he played the role of Thomas Stockman, a doctor who fights against collective egoism in Daejeon Arts Center's play Enemy of the People.

In 2013, he won the acting award at the 50th Dong-A Theater Awards for his play 'Alibi Chronicles'.

He is participating as a writer for 'Flower Shop', a newsletter published by the Seoul Foundation for Arts and Culture's Seoul Theater Center, where theater performers leave short reviews on plays. Since 2017, he has also been a member of the jury for the theater section of the 'Edaily Culture Awards'.

== Filmography ==
=== Film ===
Year	Title		Role	Notes	Ref.
Year	English	Korean	Role	Notes	Ref.
1997	Jisang Manga	지상만가	Superintendence		
1997	Eighteen eighteen	일팔일팔	말		
1998	Dinner of virgins	처녀들의 저녁식사	Chang Yoon		
1999	Shiri	쉬리	Guanho		
2004	Doll Master	인형사	middle-aged man role		
2005	My Right to Ravage Myself	나는 나를 파괴할 권리가 있다			
2006	Monopoli	모노폴리	Chairman Kim		
2006	Antique	서양 골동 양과자점 앤티크	President Cheon		
2010	Sex bolantier	섹스 볼란티어			
2011	Silenced	도가니	Professor Kim Jung-woo		
2012	All About My Wife	내 아내의 모든 것	Divorce court judge		
2013	Never Die Butterfly	네버다이 버터플라이	Myungho father		
2014	Whistle Blower	제보자	Professor Yoo Jong-jin		
2014	Quo Vadis	쿼바디스	Pastor Noh / Jesus		
2015	Yongsan Night	용산나이트			
2015	Salut d'Amour	장수상회	Old man		
2015	Love And...	필름시대사랑	An old person		
2017	The King	더 킹	Kim Min-jae		
2017	Heart Blackened	침묵	Kim Hyung-mo		
2017	Forgotten	기억의 밤	Professor Choi		
2018	The Accidental Detective 2: In Action	탐정: 리턴즈	Woo Won-il (A ledger)		
2019	Black Money	블랙머니	Na Ri-boo		
2021	Hard Hit	발신제한	President of Jang Ho Textile		
2022	Air Murder	공기살인	Professor Oh		
2022	Emergency Declaration	비상선언	NSC Chairman		
2023	The Point Men	교섭	President		
2023	Two percent	2퍼센트			

=== Television series ===
Year	Title		Role	Ref.
Year	English	Korean	Role	Ref.
2007	Coffee Prince	커피프린스 1호점	Lee Myung-jae	
2007	Drama City: Double-book Murder Case	드라마시티 - 이중장부 살인사건	Sung Joon-ho	
2008	Strongest Chil Woo	최강칠우	Jinmuyang	
2009	Tamra, the Island	탐나는도다	Kawamura Keisuke	
2009	Sister's Menopause	언니의 폐경	Soon-gil	
2009	Sungkyunkwan Scandal	성균관 스캔들	Kim Seung-heon	
2011	Detectives in Trouble	강력반	Kang Man-soo	
2012	KBS Drama Special	Professor Choi	KBS2	
2013	A Hundred Year Legacy	백년의 유산	Lee Dong-gyu	
2013	The Queen's Classroom	여왕의 교실	Mrs. Oh / Omanse	
2013	Master's Sun	주군의 태양	a man who won't sell a house	
2013	Marry Him If You Dare	미래의 선택	Kim Shin in the future	
2014	Doctor Stranger	닥터 이방인	Choi Byung-chul	
2014	My Dear Cat	고양이는 있다		
2014	Mother's Garden	엄마의 정원	Dr. No	
2014	Gunman in Joseon	조선 총잡이	Hyunam	
2014	Three Days	쓰리 데이즈	Min Hyun-ki	
2014	Modern Farmer	모던파머	Director Kang	
2014	Misaeng: Incomplete Life	미생	Jang-rae's Go master	
2014	Liar Game	라이어 게임		
2015	Blood	블러드	Jeong Han-soo	
2015	Beating Again	순정에 반하다	Lee Jung-goo	
2015	High Society	상류사회	Choi Young-ho	
2015	Yong-pal	용팔이	Chae-young's father	
2015	The Return of Hwang Geum-bok	돌아온 황금복	Hwang Man-cheol	
2015	Remember	리멤버: 아들의 전쟁	Kang Man-soo	
2016	Windstorm Planning	질풍기획	President of Jil-pong-tae	
2016	Happy Home	가화만사성	Seo Do-hyung	
2016	Local Hero	동네의 영웅	Jang Myung-jun	
2016	Monster	몬스터	Lee Jun-sik	
2016	My Lawyer, Mr. Jo	동네변호사 조들호	Choi Dong-wook	
2016	Shopping King Louie	쇼핑왕 루이	Cha Soo-il, Joong-won's father	
2016	KBS Drama Special	KBS 드라마 스페셜]] 아득히 먼 춤	collectible android	
2017	Circle	써클: 이어진 두 세계	Yoon Hak-ju	
2017	Sisters-in-Law	별별 며느리	Hwang Ho-sik	
2017	Criminal Minds	크리미널 마인드	Yoon Hee-chul	
2017	Reverse	역류	Kim Sang-jae	
2019	The Banker	더 뱅커	Professor Park Jin-ho	
2019	When the Devil Calls Your Name	악마가 너의 이름을 부를 때	Chairman Song Yeon-mo (Special appearance)	
2020	My Holo Love	나 홀로 그대	Chairman Baek	
2020	Hospital Playlist	슬기로운 의사생활	Yang Taeyang	
2020	When My Love Blooms	화양연화	Han In-ho	
2020	SF8	시네마틱드라마 SF8 - 만신	Lee Ji-ham	
2020	Lie After Lie	거짓말의 거짓말	Ji Dong-ri	
2021	Hospital Playlist	슬기로운 의사생활 2	Yang Taeyang	
2021	The King of Tears, Lee Bang-won	태종 이방원	Yi Saek	
2021	Artificial City	공작도시	Yoon Jong-pil	
2022	Doctor Lawyer	닥터 로이어	Lim Tae-moon	
2022	Remarriage & Desires	블랙의 신부	Son Pil-young	
2022	The Empire	디 엠파이어: 법의 제국	Yoo Ye-hoo (Special appearance)	
2022	One Dollar Lawyer	천원짜리 변호사	Kim Yoon-seop	
2023	Doctor Cha	닥터 차정숙	Park Ho-won	
2023	Battle for Happiness	행복배틀	Kang Bong-seok	
2023	Numbers	넘버스: 빌딩숲의 감시자들	Jang In-ho	
2024	Begins ≠ Youth	비긴즈유스	Koo Hyun-bok	
2026	Mad Concrete Dreams	대한민국에서 건물주 되는 법	Mr. Kim	

=== Music video appearances ===
Year	Song Title	Artist	Ref.
2021	"Only"	LeeHi	

== Discography ==
=== Radio program ===
- Classic Reading & Radio Biography (EBS Radio)
- 2014 EBS Reading Radio Reading Series (EBS FM)

=== Audio book ===
- Amryu of Choi In-joon read by Nam Myeong-ryeol
- Life Coordinates
- The Sand Man by Ernst Hoffmann, read by Nam Myeong-ryeol

== Stage ==
=== Musical concert ===
Year	Title		Role	Note	Ref.
Year	English	Korean	Role	Note	Ref.
2002	Party for Boris	보리스를 위한 파티	Himself		
2008	Orpheus in Music	오르페오 인 뮤직	Orpheus		
2008	Daegwallyeong International Music Festival-Eh, Joe	대관령 국제음악제-Eh, Joe			
2008–2011	Hana Yeouido Classic	하나 여의도 클래식			
2013	Meet the genius pianist Chopin	천재 피아니스트 쇼팽을 만나다			
2013	Persian prince who came to Silla	신라에 온 페르시아 왕자			
2014	A museum with music	음악이 흐르는 박물관			
2014	Psychological report on Bethoven	베토벤에 대한 심리보고서	Bethoven	Seodaemun Cultural Center Small Theater	
2014	In search of the lost Arirang	잃어버린 아리랑을 찾아서			
2015	Chamber music series with Son Jun-ho	손준호와 함께하는 실내악 시리즈			
2015	Pansori Shakespeare- Chunhyang and Juliet	판소리 셰익스피어- 춘향과 줄리엣	Romeo	the lawn of the National Assembly	
2015	Lover on the island of Mallorca	마요르카 섬의 연인	Frederic Chopin		
2015	Freud meets them in pansori	프로이드가 만나 판소리 속 그들			
2016	Bucheon Phil's Eve Concert - Bat	부천 필 제야음악회-박쥐			
2017	Art gallery concert	미술관 음악회			
2022	The dream of the opera music theatre Dumopo	오페라음악극 두모포의 꿈	Tae-jong		
2023	Every day, the 20th anniversary of classical performance, music theatre, looking for me	매일클래식 20주년 공연 음악극 나를 찾아서	Jay	Lotte Concert Hall	

=== Theater ===
Theater performance from 1970s to 1990s
Year	Title		Role	Theater	Date	Ref.
Year	English	Korean	Role	Theater	Date	Ref.
1978	Do you think I'm going to change depending on the weather?	내가 날씨에 따라 변할 사람 같소?	1st university performance			
1980	Race with a Lion	사자와의 경주	University performance			
1984	Chicken of Judas	유다의 닭	University performance			
1985	Water Bird, Water Bird	물새야, 물새야	University performance			
1986	Son of Man	사람의 아들	Min Yo-seop	Entry of the National University Theater Festival		
1987	5th Chungcheongnam-do Theater Festival: Jyeopsa Temple	(제5회) 충청남도 연극제 : 접읍사	Make-up artist	Daejeon Citizens' Center Auditorium	April 1, 1987	
1990	Oriental People	한방 사람들	Promotion	Daejeon Citizens' Center Chuncheon City Cultural Center	May 14 to 26	
1991	Citizen K	시민K		Daejeon Citizens' Center		
1992	The Accidental Death of an Anarchist	어느 무정부주의자의 사고사		Daejeon Citizens' Center		
1992	The Mask of Fire	불의 신화	Cheo-yong	Daejeon Citizens' Center		
1993	Citizen Cho Gap-chul	시민 조갑출	Cho Gap-chul	Catholic Cultural Center	April 4 to 5	
1993	The Mask of Fire - The Form of Power	불의 가면-권력의 형식	Cheo-yong	Sanwoollim Small Theater in Mapo-gu		
1994	The Mask of Fire	불의 신화	Cheo-yong	Apgujeong-dong, Gangnam	February 1–28	
1994	Birds Calling My Name and Cry	새들은 제 이름을 부르며 운다		Daehakro Ganggangsullae Theater	August 9 to 29	
1994	Kiss of the Spider Woman	거미여인의 키스	Valentin	Sanwoollim Small Theater	January 24 to February 26	
1995	Trip to Oedipus	이디푸스와의 여행	Jocasta	Cultural Arts Center Grand Theater	September 29 to October 5	
1995	The Mask of Fire	불의 신화	Cheo-yong	Arts Center's Grand Theater	June 22 to 29	
1995	The Water Station	물의 정거장		Sogetsu Hall in Tokyo	November 17 to 21	
1996	Poet and Model	시인과 모델	Poet			
1996	Song of Sorrow	슬픔의 노래	Yoo Sun-kyun	Cultural Center Small Theater	September 18 to 30	
1996–1997	The Brothers Karamazov	까라마조프가의 형제들	Iplitte	Dongsung Art Center Dongsung Hall	December 14 to February 2	
1996–1997	The Brothers Karamazov	까라마조프가의 형제들	Iplitte	Gyeonggi-do Culture and Arts Center Grand Theater; Incheon Culture and Arts Center	December 14, 1996 to March 8, 1997	
1997	Long Day's Journey into Night	밤으로의 긴 여로	James Tyrone (Jamie)	Sanullim Theater in Sinchon, Seoul	May 20 to June 22	
1997	Oedipus 1	오이디푸스1				
1997	Oedipus 2	오이디푸스2				
1998	Moon Sung-geun, Come Out	문성근 나와라		Ginkgo Tree Theater	January 15 to April 19	
1998	Human, Lear	인간, 리어		Mucheon Camp in Juksan, Gyeonggi-do	October 16 to 25	
1998–1999	Party	파티	Kim Ga-hyung	Seoul Arts Center Jayu Theater	December 31, 1999 January 17, 2000	
1999	Hamlet Project	햄릿 프로젝트	Hamlet	Festival Theater Mucheon Outdoor Theater	August 6 to 29	
1999	23rd Seoul Theatre Festival: Hamlet Project	(제23회) 서울연극제 : 햄릿 프로젝트	Hamlet	Cultural Center Grand Theater	September 22 to 28	
1999	Room No. 6	제 6호실		Jeongdong Theater in Seoul, (Russian Theater Week)	October 6–25	
1999–2000	Forgiveness	용서	Male	Ginkgo Tree Theater	November 13 to January 9	

=== Theater 2000–2010 ===
Theater play performances
Year	Title		Role	Theater	Date	Ref.
Year	English	Korean	Role	Theater	Date	Ref.
2000	Please Turn-off the Light	불 좀 꺼 주세요	—	Seoul Arts Center Towol Theater	—	
2000	Sarachi	사라치	Husband	Daehakro Arts Center Grand Theater	August 27 to October 15	
2000	Sarachi	사라치 (更地)	Husband	LABO CJK, Theater Company Open Stage Cultural Center Small Theater	September 20 to 27	
2000–2001	Without Love, There is no Woman	사랑이 없으면 여자도 없다	Man	Human Theater Small Theater	December 15 to January 28	
2001	Who's Who	누가 누구?	Man	Daehakro Theater in Seoul	February 15 to March 20	
2001	Song of Sorrow	슬픔의 노래	Yoo Sun-kyun	Kim Dong-soo Play House in Dongsung-dong	June 4 to 24	
2001	Cello and ketchup	첼로와 케찹	Cellist (man)	Dongsung Art Center Dongsung Hall	August 27 to September 13	
2001	Requiem	레퀴엠	critic	Daehakro Arts Center Grand Theater	December 15	
2002	Persona	페르소나	Director	Culture and Arts Center Small Theater	March 12 to 18	
2002	Kingdom of Things	사물의 왕국	Ma Bak-soo	National Theater's Daoreum Theater	June 6 to 9	
2002	Lady in Room 405 is so nice	405호 아줌마는 참 착하시다	Yoo Ji-ho	Dongsoong Arts Center	September 13 to 29	
2002	Hamlet Project	햄릿 프로젝트	Hamlet	Jeongdong Theater	October 10 to 30	
2003	Woyzeck	보이체크	Doctor	Seoul Arts Center Towol Theater	January 14 to February 2	
2003	Emile - The Sound of a Thousand Years	에밀레-천년의 소리		Baekgyeol Performance Hall (2003 Gyeongju World Culture Expo)	August 13-October 23	
2003	Sunset Boulevard	선셋대로		Seolchi Theater Jeongmiso	December 3 to 21	
2004	Zichatkobsky's The Seagull	지차트콥스키의 갈매기	Trigorin	Seoul Arts Center Towol Theater	April 14 to May 2	
2004	Sea and Parasol	바다와 양산	Husband	Hakjŏn Blue Small Theater	September 9, 2004 – September 26, 2004	
2005	Agamemnon	아가멤논	Chorus	Seoul Arts Center Towol Theater	April 23 to May 11	
2005	Equus	에쿠우스	Martin Dysart	Hakjŏn Blue Small Theater	September 9, 2005 – October 30, 2005	
2005	Jeon Hoon's The Seagull	갈매기	Theater Actor	National Jeongdong Theater	November 5, 2005 – November 30, 2005	
2006	Love Flows	사랑은 흘러 간다	Peter	Sanullim Small Theater	March 7 to April 30	
2006	To the River	2006 한강 문학나눔 큰잔치: 강에게	Poet	The berm under Wonhyo Bridge in Yeouido	August 24, 25, 26	
2006	Gas Light	가스등	Manningham	Seoul Arts Center Jayu Theater	October 12, 2006 – October 29, 2006	
2006	Pedra	페드라	Poet (guest)	the Free Small Theatre of the Seoul Arts Centre	December 2 to 10	
2007	Doubt	다우트	Father Flynn	Hakjeon Blue Small Theater in Daehangno	February 23, 2007 – May 20, 2007	
2007	Asian Theatre Director Workshop: Minyoung Story (Korea)	아시아 연극 연출가 워크샵 : 민영이야기 (한국)	—	Arko Arts Theater Small Theater	March 28 to April 1	
2007	Sea and Parasol	바다와 양산	Husband	The Installation Theater Jeongmiso	May 29	
2007	Noise off	노이즈 오프	Thief	Dongsoong Art Center Dongsoong Hall	September 25, 2007 – November 11, 2007	
2008	Solomon's White Circle	술로먼의 하얀 동그라미	Solomon	COEX Auditorium in Samseong-dong, Seoul from the 28th to the 30th	March 28 to 30	
2008	Knock Knock	두드리 두드리		Arco Arts Theater Grand Theater in Seoul	May 8 to 11	
2008	Proof	프루프	Robert (Math Professor)	Dure Hall 4 in Daehak-ro, Star Stage (formerly One Pass Art Hall)	July 11, 2008 – September 7, 2008	
2008	The Seagull of Yuri Butusov	유리 부투소프의 갈매기	Doctor Dorn	National Jeongdong Theater	November 7, 2008 – November 23, 2008	
2009	Sarahchi	사라치	Husband	the Jeongsimhwa International Cultural Center	January 16 to 17	
2009	The Three Sisters of Reza de Wet	레자 드 웻의 세자매	Vershinin	Arko Arts Theater Main Hall	February 11, 2009 – February 22, 2009	
2009	2009 Seoul Theater Festival - Hansel and Gretel	2009 서울연극제 - 한스와 그레텔	Hans Borchert	Arko Arts Theater Studio	May 9, 2009 – May 15, 2009	
2009	Copenhagen	코펜하겐	Doctor Bohr	Doosan Art Center Space111	May 19, 2009 – June 7, 2009	
2009	Marat/Sade	마라, 사드	Sade	Arko Arts Theater Studio	October 8, 2009 – October 18, 2009	
2010	Praise for Creation 3: Hotel in the Calm Morning; light control	창작예찬 3 : 고요한아침의 호텔; 등화관제	Mu-chil	Daehakro Arts Theater Small Theater	February 3 to 14	
2010	Copenhagen	코펜하겐		Myeongdong Art Theater Studio	March 26, 2010 – April 11, 2010	
2010	Bizarre Journey	기묘여행	Victim's Father	Arko Arts Theater Studio	April 17, 2010 – April 25, 2010	
2010	Lovers Lying in a Cornfield	옥수수 밭에 누워있는 연인	Han-yeong/Han-bo	Myeongdong Art Theater Studio	May 19, 2010 – May 23, 2010	
2010	The Stage Is Good - Full for Love	무대가 좋다 - 풀 포 러브	Old man	CJ AZIT Daehakro (formerly SM Art Hall)	July 6, 2010 – September 12, 2010	
2010	Full for Love - Daegu	풀 포 러브 - 대구	Old man	Ahyang Art Center (formerly Daegu Donggu Cultural and Sports Association)	October 23, 2010 – October 24, 2010	
2010	Proof	프루프	Robert (Math Professor)	JTN Art Hall 3	October 12, 2010 – December 12, 2010	
2010	Tree	나무	garbage removal man	Arko Arts Theater Main Hall	November 9, 2010 – November 10, 2010	

=== Theater from 2010 ===
Theater play performances from 2011 onwards
Year	Title		Role	Theater	Date	Ref.
Year	English	Korean	Role	Theater	Date	Ref.
2011	I'm just trying to make a call	나는 전화를 걸려고 온 것 뿐이에요				
2011	The Sand Station	모래의 정거장		National Theater Company Baek Seung-hee Theater	October 22, 2011 – October 23, 2011	
2011	2011 World National Theater Festival - The Sand Station	2011 세계국립극장페스티벌 - 모래의 정거장		National Theater Sky Theater	October 7, 2011 – October 8, 2011	
2011	The Sand Station - Busan	모래의 정거장 - 부산		KB Art Hall Busan (formerly LIG Art Hall Busan)	October 15, 2011 – October 16, 2011	
2011	Green Sun	녹색태양	Professor	Installation theater Jeongmiso	December 1 to 11	
2012	The Game-Crime and Punishment	The Game-죄와 벌	Porfiry	HANPAC Daehakro Arts Theater Small Theater	March 3 to 11	
2012	Winter - Sarachi	빈터 - Sarachi	Husband	Daehakro Art Theater Main Hall	May 9, 2012 – May 12, 2012	
2012	Purgatorium	푸르가토리움	Marmeladov	National Theater Starlight Theater	April 17, 2012 – April 29, 2012	
2012	And Another Day	그리고 또 하루	Hwaggo	Arko Arts Theater Studio	April 25, 2012 – April 29, 2012	
2012	Scorched Love	그을린 사랑	Emil Rebel; Malak	Myeongdong Art Theater	June 5, 2012 – July 1, 2012	
2012	Three Kingdoms Project - Dream	삼국유사 프로젝트 - 꿈	Expert	National Theater Company Baek Seung-hee Theater	September 1, 2012 – September 16, 2012	
2012	Enemies of the People	민중의 적	Thomas Stockman	Daejeon Culture and Arts Center Ensemble Hall	November 9 to the 18th	
2013	The Game - Crime and Punishment	더 게임 - 죄와 벌	Porfiry	Daehakro Art Theater Studio	February 20, 2013 – February 28, 2013	
2013	I Am My Wife	나는 나의 아내다	Charlotte	Doosan Art Center Space111	May 28, 2013 – June 29, 2013	
2013	And Another Day	그리고 또 하루	Hwaggo	Arko Arts Theater Studio	June 21, 2013 – June 30, 2013	
2013	National Theater Company Autumn Yard - Alibi Chronicles	2013 국립극단 가을마당 - 알리바이 연대기	Kim Tae-yong	Pan Theater	September 3, 2013 – September 15, 2013	
2013	Ragin	라긴	Ragin	Gwangya Theater (formerly Daehakro Art Theater 3rd Hall)	September 25, 2013 – October 6, 2013	
2013	Hamlet	햄릿		Myeongdong Art Theater	December 4, 2013 – December 29, 2013	
2014	The House where Boy B Lives	소년 B가 사는 집	Father	Daehakro Art Center K Nemo Theater	February 15 to 20	
2014	Alibi Chronicles	알리바이 연대기	Kim Tae-yong	National Theater Company Baek Seung-hee Theater	April 25, 2014 – May 11, 2014	
2014	Take Care of My Mom - Bupyeong	엄마를 부탁해 - 부평	Father	Bupyeong Art Center Dalnuri Theater	March 27, 2014 – March 27, 2014	
2014	Forest Ghost	숲귀신	Célestin Bréacoff	Former Andup Theater	July 10, 2014 – August 10, 2014	
2014	A Tribe Called Family	가족이란 이름의 부족	Christopher	Seoul Arts Center Freedom Theater	November 8, 2014 – December 14, 2014	
2015	Chamber Music Series with Son Jun-ho	손준호와 함께하는 실내악 시리즈	Himself	Nowon Culture and Arts Center Grand Theater	July 22, 2015 – July 22, 2015	
2015	Father and Son	아버지와 아들	Pavel	Myeongdong Art Theater	September 2, 2015 – September 25, 2015	
2016	Moonlight Misty Road	달빛 안갯길	Sokichi Tsuda	Daehakro Art Theater Main Theater	January 23, 2016 – February 6, 2016	
2016	Copenhagen	코펜하겐	Doctor Bohr	Dongsoong Art Center Small Theater	July 14, 2016 – July 31, 2016	
2016	Song of Sorrow	슬픔의 노래	Yoo Sung-gyun	Art One Theater 3rd Hall	October 28, 2016 – November 20, 2016	
2017	Medea	메디아	Aegeus	Myeongdong Art Theater	February 24, 2017 – April 2, 2017	
2017	Screamers 2	비명자들2	Moojinjang	NARU Art Center Grand Theater	November 22, 2017 – November 30, 2017	
2017	Way of forgetting-Sunday only in the afternoon	망각의 방법-오후만 있던 일요일	Male	Doosan Art Center Space111	December 15–25, 2017	
2018	Becoming Kkokdu	꼭두되기	Kkokdu	Namsangol Hanok Village	October 22 to the 30th	
2018	Screamers 2	비명자들2	Moojinjang	NARU Art Center Grand Theater	November 14, 2018 – November 23, 2018	
2018	The Story of a Magician	어느 마술사 이야기	Magician	Catholic Youth Center Bridge Small Theater (formerly CY Theater)	December 14, 2018 – December 23, 2018	
2019	Oedipus	오이디푸스	Corinthian Lion	Art One Theater	January 29, 2019 – February 24, 2019	
2019	Oedipus	오이디푸스	Corinthian Lion	Korean Sound Culture Center Moak Hall	March 8, 2019 – March 9, 2019	
2019	Oedipus	오이디푸스	Corinthian Lion	Gwangju Culture and Art Center Grand Theater	March 15, 2019 – March 17, 2019	
2019	Oedipus	오이디푸스	Corinthian Lion	Guri Art Hall Cosmos Grand Theater	March 22, 2019 – March 23, 2019	
2019	Oedipus	오이디푸스	Corinthian Lion	GS Caltex Yeulmaru Grand Theater, Yeosu	March 29, 2019 – March 31, 2019	
2019	Oedipus	오이디푸스	Corinthian Lion	Ulsan Culture & Arts Center Grand Theater	April 5, 2019 – April 6, 2019	
2019	I Like My Teacher	나는 선생님이 좋아요	Grandpa Baku	Chungmu Art Center Convention Hall	April 18, 2019 – April 18, 2019	
2019	Scorched Love	그을린 사랑	Emil Rebel, Malak	Olympic Park K Art Hall	July 11, 2019 – August 10, 2019	
2019	Riding together	동승		Hwaseong Park in Andong Religious Town	September 18	
2019	Alibi Chronicles	알리바이 연대기	Kim Tae-yong	Myeongdong Art Theater	October 16, 2019 – November 10, 2019	
2020	Last Session	라스트 세션	Sigmund Freud	Yes24 Stage 3rd Theater	July 10, 2020 – September 13, 2020	
2020	Old Wicked Songs	올드위키드송	Joseph Mashkan	Yes24 Stage 3rd Theater	December 8, 2020 – March 1, 2021	
2021	Hello, Summer	안녕, 여름	George	Uniplex 2nd Theater	April 27, 2021 – June 20, 2021	
2021	Scorched Love	그을린 사랑	Emil Rebel; Malak	LG Art Center	May 25, 2021 – May 30, 2021	
2021	The Time We Couldn't Know Each Other	우리가 서로 알 수 없었던 시간	Special Appearance	Culture Station Seoul 284 T2 Performance Hall	August 14, 2021 – August 22, 2021	
2021	Lovesong	러브 송	William	Daehakro Arts Theater in Jongno-gu, Seoul	September 19 to October 3	
2022	A Tribe Called Family	가족이란 이름의 부족	Christopher	National Jeongdong Theater	January 18, 2022 – February 27, 2022	
2022	Jealousy	이호재 무대 60년 기념 공연 - 질투	Chunsan	Hakjeon Blues Theater	May 27, 2022 – June 5, 2022	
2022	The Two Popes	두 교황	Cardinal Jorge Mario Bergoglio Sivory / Pope Francis	Hanjeon Art Center	August 30, 2022 – October 30, 2022	
2022	Orphans	오펀스	Harold	Art One Theater 1st Theater	November 29, 2022 – February 26, 2023	
2023	Last Session	라스트 세션	Sigmund Freud	Daehangno TOM Theater Hall 1	July 8, 2023 – September 10, 2023	
2023	10th Anniversary Celebration of National Sejong Library — Long Night	국립세종도서관 10주년기념행사 - 음악낭독극 – 낭만씨어터 「긴긴밤」	Norton	National Sejong Library Lobby	December 12, 2023 – December 12, 2023	
2024	Hamlet	햄릿	Polonius	Hongik University Daehakro Art Center Main Theater	June 9, 2024 – September 1, 2024	

== Ambassadorship ==
- 2022: Public Relations Ambassador for the Film Festival Drawn by Dae Cheong-ho

== Accolades ==
=== Awards and nominations ===
Year	Award	Category	Nominated work	Result	Ref.
1986	Chungcheongnam-do Theatre Festival	Acting Award	Son of a Man	Won	
1993	Daejeon Theatre Festival	Acting Award	Mask of Fire	Won	
1996	New Year's Literature and Theatre Awards	Best Actor	Poet and Model	Won	
2002	28th Younghee Theatre Award	Best Actor	Seagull and Sea and Parasol	Won	
2002	Seoul Performing Arts Festival	Acting Award	Seagull and Sea and Parasol	Won	
2003	Gyeongju World Culture Expo	Commendation for merit	Emile - The Sound of a Thousand Years	Won	
2009	14th Hiseo Theatre Award	Theatre Actor of the Year	Nam Myeong-ryeol	Won	
2009	Korean Theatre Awards	Acting Award	Copenhagen	Won	
2012	13th Kim Dong-hoon Theatre Award	Best Actor	Scorched Love, Dream, and Enemy of the People	Won	
2013	6th Korean Theatre Awards Acting Award	Best Actor	Alibi Chronicle	Won	
2013	50th Dong-A Theatre Awards	Best Actor	Alibi Chronicle	Won	
2022	32nd Lee Hae-rang Theatre Award	Theater Award	Nam Myeong-ryeol	Won	

=== State honors ===
Name of country, year given, and name of honor
Country	Award ceremony	Year	Honor or Awards	Ref.
South Korea	Korea Culture and Arts Award (Note: Korea Culture and Arts Award (대한민국문화예술상) was established in 1969. Given as part of celebration of South Korea Cultural Day (문화의 날), 3rd Saturday in October)	2020	Presidential Commendation category: theater	
