= Zo In-sung =

South Korean actor (born 1981)

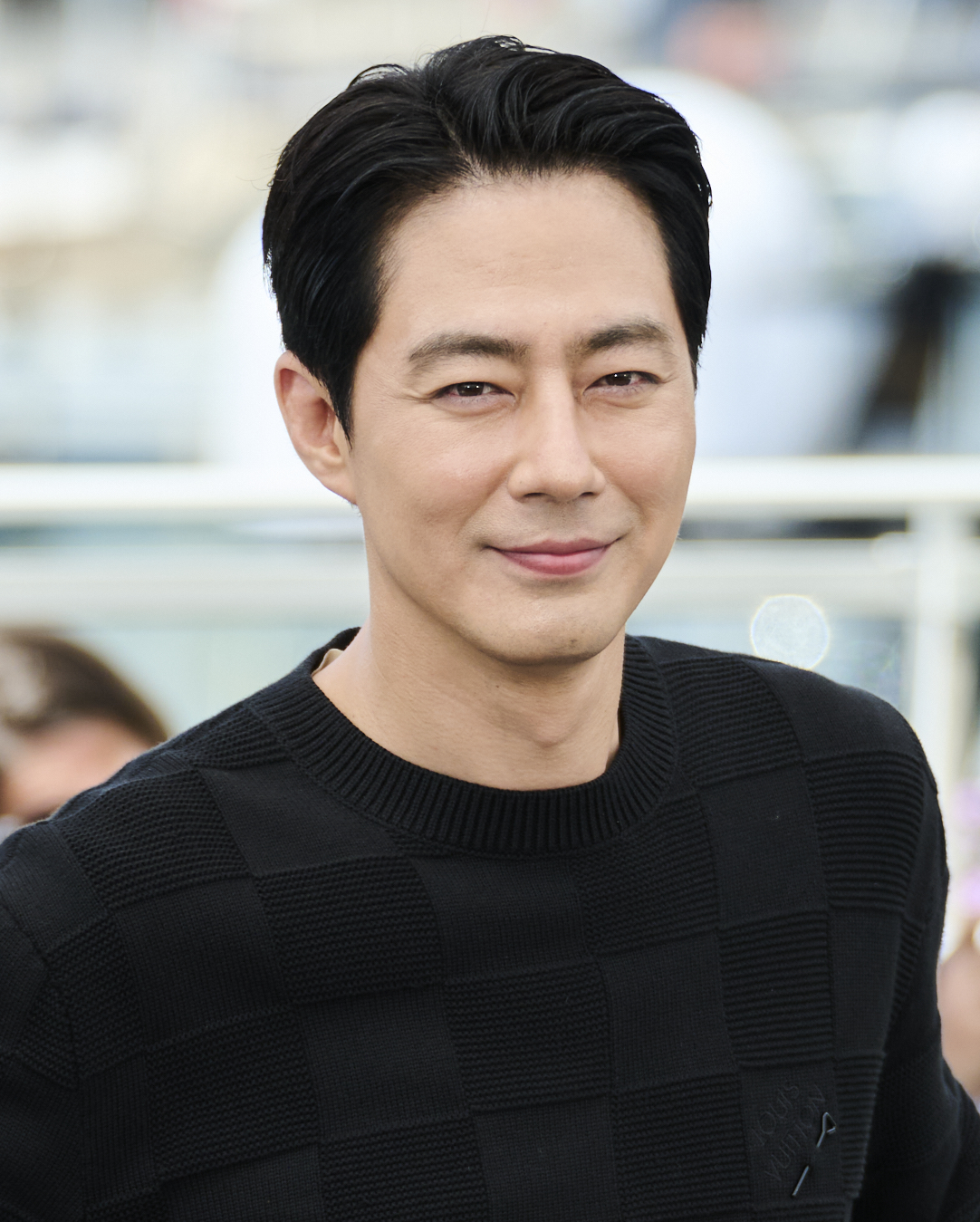
- Zo in 2026
- Born: July 28, 1981 (age 45); Seoul, South Korea
- Other names: Cho In-sung, Jo In-sung
- Education: Chunnam Techno University
- Occupation: Actor
- Years active: 1998–present
- Agent: Basecamp Company

Korean name
- Hangul: 조인성
- Hanja: 趙寅成
- RR: Jo Inseong
- MR: Cho Insŏng

Zo In-sung (Korean: 조인성, born July 28, 1981), previously known as Cho In-sung, and occasionally referred to as Jo In-sung, is a South Korean actor. He is best known for his leading roles in the television series Something Happened in Bali (2004), Spring Day (2005), That Winter, the Wind Blows (2013), It's Okay, That's Love (2014), and Moving (2023). In film, he is known for his roles in The Classic (2003), A Dirty Carnival (2006), A Frozen Flower (2008), The King (2017), The Great Battle (2018), and Escape from Mogadishu (2021). He also starred in the reality show Unexpected Business (2021–2024).

== Early life and education ==
Zo In-sung was born and raised in Gangdong District, Seoul. He studied modeling and events management at Chunnam Techno University. He later enrolled as a Theater and Film major at Dongguk University, but was expelled in 2007 due to inadequate class attendance.

== Career ==
=== 1998–2002: Beginnings and rise to fame ===
Zo made his entertainment debut in 1998 as a model for clothing brand Ziozia. He began his acting career in 1999 through the MBC sitcom Jump and, in 2000, starred in the teen drama School 3 and in the second season of the sitcom Nonstop.

Zo first drew notice with a supporting role in the 2001 television drama Piano, co-starring Go Soo and Kim Ha-neul. He was then cast in his first drama leading role in 2002, as an illiterate actor in Shoot for the Stars opposite Jeon Do-yeon. The same year, he made his film debut in the movie Public Toilet. He also starred in several music videos of popular boy band g.o.d, a fellow SidusHQ artiste at that time, and was directed by actor Jung Woo-sung.

=== 2003–2008: Mainstream popularity ===
In 2003, Zo starred in three romantic films, most notably Kwak Jae-yong's The Classic, with Son Ye-jin and Cho Seung-woo.

In 2004, he returned to television in the melodrama Something Happened in Bali, alongside Ha Ji-won and So Ji-sub. Something Happened was a huge success, with its final episode reaching a peak rating of 39.7%. Zo won Best Actor awards at both the Baeksang Arts Awards and SBS Drama Awards.

In 2005, he starred opposite Go Hyun-jung in her comeback drama Spring Day, a remake of the Japanese drama Heaven's Coin.

Zo collaborated with renowned director Yoo Ha in his next two films: 2006's A Dirty Carnival, in which he played a charismatic small-time gangster who seeks a happier life, and 2008's A Frozen Flower, a Goryeo-period film where his royal bodyguard character is caught in a love triangle between the king and the queen.

=== 2009–2012: Enlistment ===
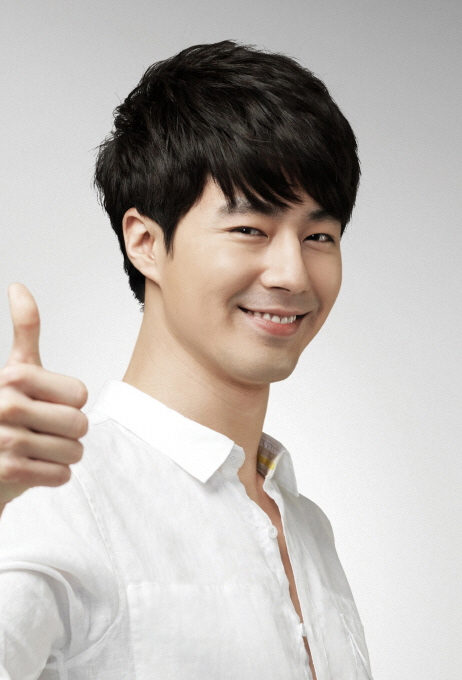
Zo in 2011

On April 7, 2009, Zo enlisted for his two-year mandatory military service; he reportedly wanted to join the Air Force to follow in the footsteps of his father, who served as a non-commissioned officer. He served 25 months in the Air Force and the Air Force military band, and was discharged on May 4, 2011.

Upon the expiry of his contract with talent agency SidusHQ, Zo joined IOK Company in March 2012.

=== 2013–present: Return to television and international recognition ===
In 2013, he co-starred in the melodrama That Winter, the Wind Blows alongside Song Hye-kyo, a remake of the Japanese drama Forget Love (愛なんていらねえよ、夏, Ai nante Irane yo, Natsu). The drama placed number one in its time slot during most of its run, and Zo and Song were praised for their performances. A year later, Zo reunited with That Winter's teleplay writer and director in SBS's medical melodrama It's Okay, That's Love opposite Gong Hyo-jin. Zo won the Daesang (Grand Prize), the highest honor for television at the APAN Star Awards.

In 2016, Zo was chosen as the ambassador of the National Tax Service alongside Choi Ji-woo.

In 2017, Zo starred in the crime thriller The King alongside Jung Woo-sung, directed by The Face Reader director Han Jae-rim. In 2018, he starred in the historical film The Great Battle.

In March 2025, Zo decided not to renew his exclusive contract with IOK Company after 13 years. On March 4, it was reported that he will establish a new company with Cha Tae-hyun, which was later named as Basecamp Company.

== Other works ==
=== Endorsements ===
In 2001, Zo earned title best male rookie for CF model. In 2002, Zo ranked first among male celebrity as "the celebrity who is likely to appear the most in CF this year". In 2004, he paired with Lee Yeon-hee as advertising model for Fujifilm FinePix digital camera. In 2006, Zo was model of LG Electronics TROMM washing machine. In 2007, he became face of Amore Pacific's 'Laneige Homme'. In 2008, he was paired with Han Hyo-joo to advertise the coffee brand Maxim.

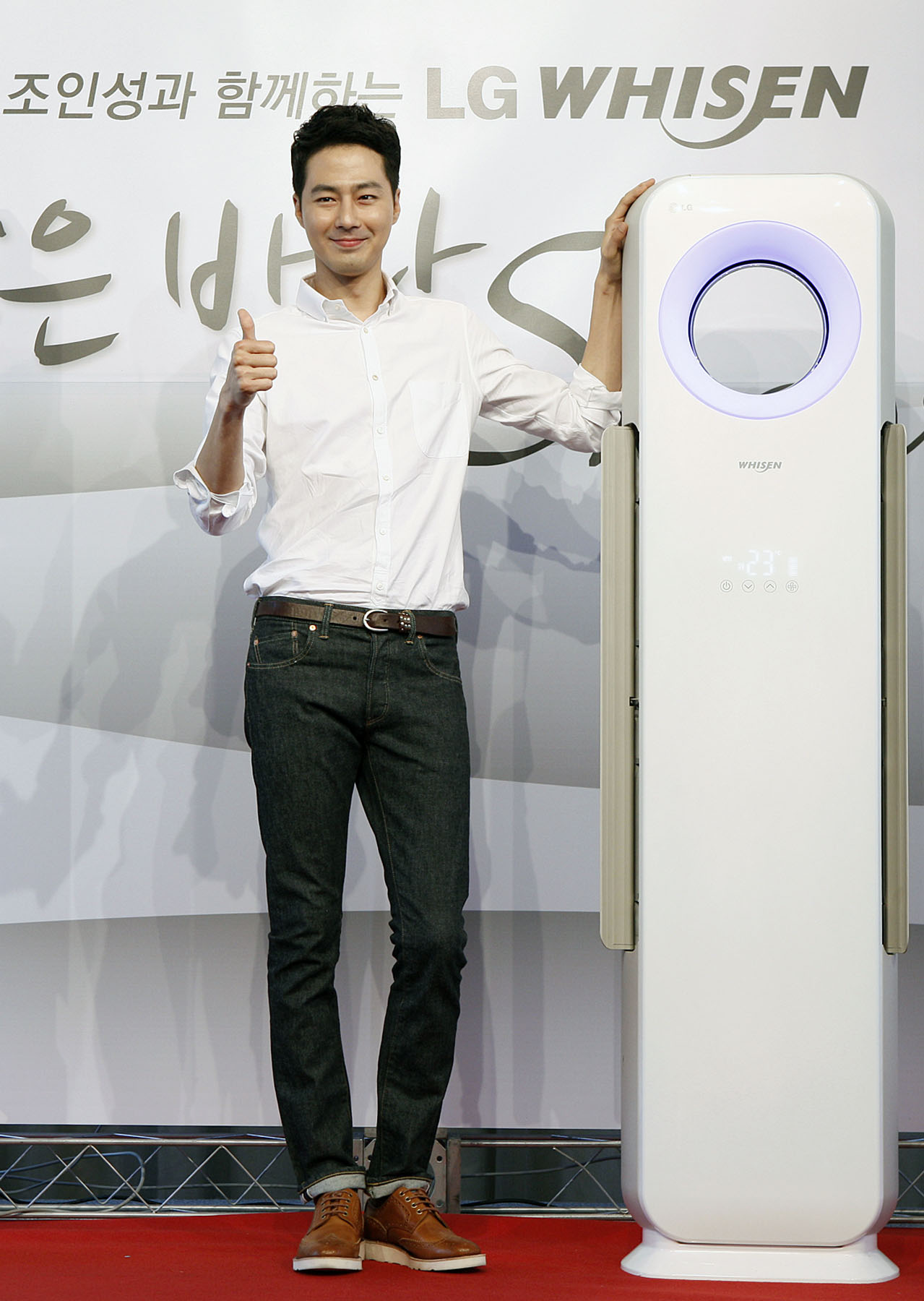
Zo for LG Whisen

After being discharged from the military in 2011, Zo reclaimed his CF King title. He was selected as a brand advertising model for SK Telesis 'W'. He signed with as a model for kimchi refrigerator "Dimchae" and LG Whisen air conditioner. Zo also signed contracts with food and beverage such as Outback Steakhouse, Cass Beer, and Woongjin Foods. In 2014, he went to Himalaya to film for an outdoor clothing brand. He was with the brand for five years from 2011 to 2016. In 2016, Angel-in-us wanted to shoot women's hearts with Zo as the model. In the following year, Zo became model for the bedding product brand Evezary. Zo signed with Asahi Beer in 2018. In 2019, Zo signed as an advertising model of food brand Ottogi.

In 2020, Zo was paired with Han Ji-min to advertise Onyu Pharmaceutical, a health food brand. In February 2021, IOK Company announced that Zo became the exclusive model of Ranking Chicken Com. Ranking Chicken Com is an online platform that provides a service that allows consumers to compare and buy various chicken breast brands. In September, Zo was signed as ambassador for a luxury shopping platform, Catch Fashion. In the end of 2021, Zo re-signed as an advertising model of food brand Ottogi. It was announced on January 15, 2022, that the sales of dumpling jumped 167% compared to the same month of the previous year, recording the highest monthly sales since its launch. Ottogi released new 'XO dumplings' advertisement featuring actor Zo in the winter, the peak season for frozen dumplings.

=== Philanthropy ===
According to a non-governmental organization MIRAL Welfare Foundation, Jo has generously donated 500 million won (almost 440 thousand dollars) to help the people in Tanzania. The foundation also stated that the donation was used to build Singida New Vision School located in central Tanzania.

== Personal life ==
In 2013, it was reported that Zo and Kim Min-hee have been in a relationship since earlier in the year. Both their agencies confirmed this. On September 24, 2014, Zo and Kim confirmed that they ended their year-and-a-half-long relationship.

== Filmography ==
Key
†	Denotes films that have not yet been released

=== Film ===
Year	Title	Role	Notes	Ref.
2002	Public Toilet	Cho	Korea-Hong Kong joint film	
2003	Madeleine	Kang Ji-suk		
2003	The Classic	Oh Sang-min		
2003	Love Impossible	Kim Chul-soo		
2006	A Dirty Carnival	Kim Byung-doo		
2008	A Frozen Flower	Hong-rim		
2017	The King	Park Tae-soo		
2017	Love Jo. Right Now	Himself	Cameo	
2018	The Great Battle	Yang Manch'un		
2021	Escape from Mogadishu	Kang Dae-jin		
2023	Smugglers	Sergeant Kwon		
2026	Humint	Manager Zo		
2026	Hope	Ko Sung-ki		
2026	Possible Love	Han Sang-woo		

=== Television series ===
Year	Title	Role	Notes	Ref.
1999	Jump			
2000	School 3	Kim Seok-joo		
2000	New Nonstop	Zo In-sung	Ep. 169, 177–468	
2001	Drama City: "Love Me Tender"	Joon-ho		
2001	Drama City: "Like a Pure Comic"	Kim Jung-hyun		
2001	Piano	Lee Kyung-ho		
2002	Great Ambition	young Lee Soo	Cameo (episode 1)	
2002	Shoot for the Stars	Gu Sung-tae		
2003	Hey Hey Hey	Zo In-sung	episode 39	
2004	Something Happened in Bali	Jung Jae-min		
2005	Spring Day	Go Eun-sup		
2013	That Winter, the Wind Blows	Oh Soo		
2014	It's Okay, That's Love	Jang Jae-yeol		
2016	Dear My Friends	Seo Yeon-ha	Special appearance	
2023	Moving	Kim Doo-shik		

=== Television shows ===
Year	Title	Role	Notes	Ref.
2021–2023	Unexpected Business	MC	with Cha Tae-hyun – Season 1–3	

=== Music video appearances ===
Year	Song Title	Artist	Ref.
2000	"She's Leaving Me"	Shin Seung-hun	
2000	"Now"	Fin.K.L	
2002	"Sad Love"	g.o.d	
2002	"You Don't Know"	g.o.d	
2002	"Fool"	g.o.d	
2012	"Love"	Kim C	

== Accolades ==
=== Awards and nominations ===
Name of the award ceremony, year presented, category, nominee of the award, and the result of the nomination
Award ceremony	Year	Category	Nominee / Work	Result	Ref.
APAN Star Awards	2013	Top Excellence Award, Actor	That Winter, the Wind Blows	Nominated	
APAN Star Awards	2014	Grand Prize (Daesang)	It's Okay, That's Love	Won	
APAN Star Awards	2014	Top Excellence Award, Actor in a Miniseries	It's Okay, That's Love	Nominated	
Baeksang Arts Awards	2002	Best New Actor – Television	Piano	Nominated	
Baeksang Arts Awards	2004	Best Actor – Television	Something Happened in Bali	Won	
Baeksang Arts Awards	2005	Most Popular Actor – Television	Spring Day	Won	
Baeksang Arts Awards	2007	Best Actor – Film	A Dirty Carnival	Nominated	
Baeksang Arts Awards	2015	Best Actor – Television	It's Okay, That's Love	Nominated	
Beautiful Artist Awards (Shin Young-kyun Arts and Culture Foundation)	2023	Good People Artist Award	Zo In-sung	Won	
Blue Dragon Film Awards	2006	Best Leading Actor	A Dirty Carnival	Nominated	
Blue Dragon Film Awards	2017	Best Leading Actor	The King	Nominated	
Blue Dragon Film Awards	2017	Popular Star Award	The King	Won	
Blue Dragon Film Awards	2021	Best Leading Actor	Escape from Mogadishu	Nominated	
Blue Dragon Film Awards	2023	Best Supporting Actor	Smugglers	Won	
Blue Dragon Film Awards	2023	Popular Star Award	Smugglers	Won	
Blue Dragon Film Awards	2026	Best Leading Actor	Hope	Pending	
Blue Dragon Film Awards	2026	Best Supporting Actor	Possible Love	Pending	
Buil Film Awards	2021	Star of the Year	Escape from Mogadishu	Won	
Buil Film Awards	2026	Best Actor	Hope	Nominated	
Busan International Film Festival	2007	Star Summit Asia – Curtain Call	Zo In-sung	Won	
Esquire Man at His Best Awards	2014	Most Popular Overseas Artist	Zo In-sung	Won	
Grand Bell Awards	2007	Best Actor	A Dirty Carnival	Nominated	
Grand Bell Awards	2017	Best Actor	The King	Nominated	
KBS Drama Awards	2000	Best Young Actor	School 3	Won	
KCA Consumer Day Awards	2018	Best Actor	The Great Battle	Won	
Korea Advertisers' Association	2011	Good Model Award	Zo In-sung	Won	
Korea Advertising Festival	2007	Netizen's Choice for Best Male Model	Zo In-sung	Won	
Korean Film Awards	2006	Best Actor	A Dirty Carnival	Won	
Korean Association of Film Critics Awards	2026	Best Actor	Hope	Won	
Malaysia Golden Global Awards	2017	Best Actor	The King	Nominated	
Marie Claire Asia Star Awards	2026	Actor of the Year Award	Hope & Possible Love & Humint	Won	
Max Movie Awards	2007	Best Actor	A Dirty Carnival	Won	
MBC Entertainment Awards	2001	Excellence Award, Actor in a Comedy / Sitcom	New Nonstop	Won	
Mnet 20's Choice Awards	2007	Best Actor	A Dirty Carnival	Won	
Mnet 20's Choice Awards	2007	Most Photogenic Star	Zo In-sung	Won	
Mnet 20's Choice Awards	2007	Best CF Star	Zo In-sung	Won	
Motion Pictures Day	2007	Most Promising Actor	A Dirty Carnival	Won	
Premiere Rising Star Awards	2006	Best Actor	A Dirty Carnival	Nominated	
Pyeongtaek Film Festival	2006	Best Actor	A Dirty Carnival	Won	
SBS Drama Awards	2001	New Star Award	Piano	Won	
SBS Drama Awards	2002	Excellence Award, Actor in a Special Planning Drama	Shoot for the Stars	Nominated	
SBS Drama Awards	2002	Netizen Popularity Award	Shoot for the Stars	Won	
SBS Drama Awards	2002	Top 10 Stars	Shoot for the Stars	Won	
SBS Drama Awards	2004	Top Excellence Award, Actor	Something Happened in Bali	Won	
SBS Drama Awards	2004	Excellence Award, Actor in a Special Planning Drama	Something Happened in Bali	Nominated	
SBS Drama Awards	2004	Top 10 Stars	Something Happened in Bali	Won	
SBS Drama Awards	2005	Top Excellence Award, Actor	Spring Day	Nominated	
SBS Drama Awards	2005	Excellence Award, Actor in a Special Planning Drama	Spring Day	Nominated	
SBS Drama Awards	2005	Netizen Popularity Award	Spring Day	Won	
SBS Drama Awards	2005	Top 10 Stars	Spring Day	Won	
SBS Drama Awards	2013	SBS Special Award	That Winter, the Wind Blows	Won	
SBS Drama Awards	2013	Top Excellence Award, Actor in a Miniseries	That Winter, the Wind Blows	Nominated	
SBS Drama Awards	2013	Top 10 Stars	That Winter, the Wind Blows	Won	
SBS Drama Awards	2013	Best Couple Award (with Song Hye-kyo)	That Winter, the Wind Blows	Nominated	
SBS Drama Awards	2014	Top Excellence Award, Actor in a Miniseries	It's Okay, That's Love	Nominated	
SBS Drama Awards	2014	Top 10 Stars	It's Okay, That's Love	Won	
SBS Drama Awards	2014	Best Couple Award (with Gong Hyo-jin)	It's Okay, That's Love	Won	
Sohu Fashion Awards	2014	Fashion Idol of the Year	Zo In-sung	Won	
Style Icon Awards	2014	Style Icon of the Year	Zo In-sung	Won	
Style Icon Awards	2014	Top 10 Style Icons	Zo In-sung	Won	
tvN10 Awards	2016	Best Kiss Award (with Go Hyun-jung)	Dear My Friends	4th place	

=== State honors ===
Name of the country, organization, year presented, and the award given
Country	Organization	Year	Award	Ref.
South Korea	Republic of Korea Air Force	2011	Honorary Citation from the Chief of Staff	
South Korea	Savings Day	2012	Presidential Commendation	
South Korea	Taxpayers' Day	2016	Presidential Commendation	

=== Listicles ===
Name of publisher, year listed, name of listicle, and placement
Publisher	Year	Listicle	Placement	Ref.
Forbes	2015	Korea Power Celebrity 40	32nd	
Gallup Korea	2014	Television Actor of the Year	7th	
Gallup Korea	2018	Film Actor of the Year	9th	
Gallup Korea	2021	Film Actor of the Year	10th	
Gallup Korea	2023	Film Actor of the Year	8th	
