= Spring Day (TV series) =

2005 South Korean television series

- Also known as: Spring Days
- Hangul: 봄날
- RR: Bomnal
- MR: Pomnal
- Genre: Romance, drama
- Written by: Kim Kyu-wan
- Directed by: Kim Jong-hyuk
- Starring: Go Hyun-jung; Zo In-sung; Ji Jin-hee
- Music by: Choi Seong-wook
- No. of episodes: 20

Production
- Executive producers: Moon Jung-soo; Teddy Hoon-tak Jung
- Producers: Kim Yang; Yoon Shin-ae
- Production company: SidusHQ

Original release
- Network: SBS TV
- Release: January 8 – March 13, 2005

Spring Day (Korean: 봄날; RR: Bomnal) is a 2005 South Korean television drama series starring Go Hyun-jung, Zo In-sung, and Ji Jin-hee. Loosely adapted from the 1995 Japanese drama Heaven's Coin (星の金貨, Hoshi no Kinka), it aired on SBS from January 8 to March 13, 2005, on Saturdays and Sundays at 21:45 for 20 episodes.

The series marked Go Hyun-jung's acting comeback 10 years after she retired from the entertainment industry upon marriage to a chaebol (they divorced in 2003). Largely due to Go, Spring Day became the 5th most popular Korean drama of 2005 with an average viewer rating of 30 percent.

== Synopsis ==
Go Eun-ho (Ji Jin-hee), a doctor from Seoul, goes to Biyang Island to meet his father's mentor. There, he meets Seo Jung-eun (Go Hyun-jung), a silent, elusive beauty who has suffered a trauma so great that she's lost the will to speak. Fascinated and empathetic, Eun-ho helps Jung-eun find a way to overcome her past. But just when her gratitude starts to blossom into love, fate cruelly intervenes, leaving Eun-ho in a coma, caused by a car accident when driving with his long-lost mother, who died at the scene.

At the hospital, Jung-eun meets Eun-ho's stepbrother Eun-sup (Zo In-sung), who is also a doctor. Despite his best intentions, Eun-sup finds himself powerless to resist Jung-eun, and he falls for her as Eun-ho lies comatose. Later, Eun-ho does regain consciousness, but his state of mind is stuck in childhood. Little by little, he begins to regain his memory. One day as he intercepts a car, he starts to recall the past and understand that his unacknowledged pain and fear of cars resulted from his mother's death. Jung-eun, fed up with hiding the truth, tells him the shocking news that his mother died in a car accident.

Latent rivalries and misunderstandings come to a boil as the two brothers fight for Jung-eun's affection, with other opposing characters making matters worse. A bar girl and Kim Min-jung both despise Jung-eun for stealing the hearts of Eun-sup and Eun-ho, respectively. Eun-sup's mother also shows disdain for Jung-eun, since she sees Jung-eun's grandfather, her husband's mentor, as a threat to her marriage. Spiteful that Eun-ho desires to marry Jung-eun, Eun-sup's mother contemplates a plan using Min-jung to poison their relationship. Min-jung visits Jung-eun, deceitfully telling her that she is hindering Eun-ho from a successful career by furthering his studies at the prestigious Johns Hopkins School of Medicine, which his family wants for him. Believing this, Jung-eun breaks off her engagement to Eun-ho, and leaves him.

Eun-sup one day sees the phony medical school pamphlet that Min-jung presented to Jung-eun, and tells Eun-ho about it. Min-jung admits her scheme to Eun-ho, saying it was done out of her love for him. Eun-ho confronts Jung-eun and tells her about the misunderstanding, but Jung-eun refuses to reconcile. She then confesses that her heart loves Eun-sup, not him. After Eun-sup learns that Jung-eun loves him back, they spend more time together before she goes back to Biyang Island. In the end, Eun-ho decides to forget his feelings for Jung-eun and forces himself to like Min-jung. The two brothers are reconciled. Eun-sup leaves Seoul to become a doctor at the Biyang Health Center, while living with Jung-eun on the island. The ending scene recalls the drama's opening scene as Jung-eun runs to the ferry to reunite with her love, who is now Eun-sup.

== Cast ==
- Go Hyun-jung as Seo Jung-eun
  - Jang Ah-young as young Seo Jung-eun
- Zo In-sung as Go Eun-sup
- Ji Jin-hee as Go Eun-ho
- Han Go-eun as Kim Min-jung
- Shin Choong-shik as Seo Dal-ho (Jung-eun's grandfather)
- Jang Yong as Go Hyung-jin (Eun-sup's and Eun-ho's father)
- Lee Hwi-hyang as Oh Hye-rim (Eun-sup's mother)
- Park Chul-min as Lee Jin-tae
- Lee So-yeon as Kim Kyung-ah (bar girl)
- Lee Kyung-jin as Eun-ho's mother (piano teacher)
- Park Jung-woo as Sung-joon
- Jo Eun-sook as Yoon-sook (runaway mother)
- Oh Ji-hye
- Lee Hyun-woo
- Jung Jong-joon as gang boss
