= Jung Eun-woo =

South Korean actor (1986–2026)

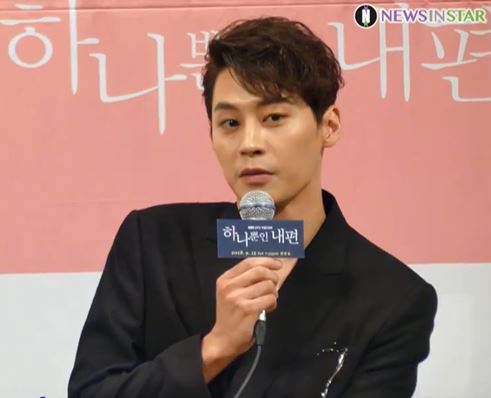
- Jung in 2018
- Born: Jung Dong-jin; April 10, 1986; Incheon, South Korea
- Died: February 11, 2026 (aged 39)
- Education: Dongguk University – Theater and Film
- Occupation: Actor
- Years active: 2006–2026
- Agent: Blue Dragon Entertainment

Korean name
- Hangul: 정동진
- RR: Jeong Dongjin
- MR: Chŏng Tongjin

Stage name
- Hangul: 정은우
- RR: Jeong Eunu
- MR: Chŏng Ŭnu

Jung Dong-jin (Korean: 정동진; April 10, 1986 – February 11, 2026), known professionally as Jung Eun-woo (Korean: 정은우), was a South Korean actor. He starred in television dramas such as One Well-Raised Daughter (2013–2014) and The Return of Hwang Geum-bok (2015).

Jung dated actress Park Han-byul.

Jung died suddenly on February 11, 2026, at the age of 39.

== Filmography ==
=== Television series ===
Year	Title	Role	Network
2006	Drama City "A Parting More Beautiful Than Love"	Kang-ho	KBS2
2006	Sharp 3	Uhm Sung-min	KBS2
2006	Fireworks		MBC
2007	H.I.T	Kim Il-joo	MBC
2010	The Slave Hunters	Warrior	KBS2
2010	A Man Called God	Son Chul	MBC
2010	Smart Action	Tae-ho	KBS World
2011	Smile Again	Kim Sun-woo	KBS1
2011	Bride of the Sun	Choi Jin-hyuk/James	SBS
2012	Five Fingers	Hong Woo-jin	SBS
2013	Stranger	Lee Young-ho	SBS
2013	KBS Drama Special "Outlasting Happiness"	Joon-ki	KBS2
2013	One Well-Raised Daughter	Seol Do-hyun	SBS
2014	KBS Drama Special "The Tale of the Bookworm"	Cheong Joon	KBS2
2015	My Heart Twinkle Twinkle	Gu Kwan-mo	SBS
2015	The Return of Hwang Geum-bok	Kang Moon-hyuk	SBS
2018	My Only One	Wang Yi-ryook	KBS2
2019	Welcome to Waikiki 2	Min-seok	jTBC

=== Film ===
Year	Title	Role
2007	My Tutor Friend 2	Jung Woo-sung's friend
2010	Me, Neither (short film)	
2010	Romantic Debtors	Sang-hyuk
2013	Mischange	Jo Hyun-goo

== Awards and nominations ==
Name of the award ceremony, year presented, category, nominee of the award, and the result of the nomination
Award ceremony	Year	Category	Nominated work	Result	Ref.
Andre Kim Best Star Awards	2007	New Star Award	—N/a	Won	
SBS Drama Awards	2012	New Star Award	Five Fingers	Won	
SBS Drama Awards	2013	Special Acting Award, Actor in a Drama Short	Stranger	Won	
SBS Drama Awards	2015	Special Award, Actor in a Serial Drama	The Return of Hwang Geum-bok	Nominated	
