= A Dirty Carnival =

- Theatrical release poster
- Hangul: 비열한 거리
- Hanja: 卑劣한 거리
- RR: Biyeolhan geori
- MR: Piyŏrhan kŏri
- Directed by: Yoo Ha
- Written by: Yoo Ha
- Produced by: Cha Seung-jae; Kim Mi-hee; Choi Seon-jeong
- Starring: Zo In-sung; Namkoong Min; Lee Bo-young; Chun Ho-jin
- Cinematography: Choi Hyeon-gi
- Edited by: Park Gok-ji; Jeong Jin-hee
- Music by: Jo Yeong-wook
- Production company: Sidus Pictures
- Distributed by: CJ Entertainment
- Release date: June 15, 2006
- Running time: 141 minutes
- Country: South Korea
- Language: Korean
- Box office: US$10,371,998

A Dirty Carnival (Korean: 비열한 거리; lit. 'The Mean Street') is a 2006 South Korean neo-noir action film directed by Yoo Ha. It is Yoo Ha's fourth feature film, his previous work being the 2004 drama Once Upon a Time in High School. The film was released on 15 June 2006.

== Plot ==
Kim Byung-doo, a small-time gangster in his late 20s, is unable to acquire the money necessary to save his family from eviction, Byung-doo subverts his boss, Sang-chul, and takes a job directly from President Hwang, Sang-chul's boss, to eliminate Attorney Park, a public prosecutor who has been bothersome to President Hwang. On this job's completion, Byung-doo receives the money he was hoping for in addition to President Hwang's respect and a spot at his side. Byung-doo and President Hwang swear never to speak of the hit to anyone so that they, and the organization, will not be implicated.

While these events unfold, Byung-doo is reunited with his elementary school friend, Min-ho, who has become a movie director. Min-ho's current project is a gangster film, although prospective scripts are continuously shot down by his higher-ups for being too fake. In an attempt to improve the film's authenticity, Min-ho sets out to interview Byung-doo who he sees as "a real gangster". Meanwhile, Min-ho manages to reunite Byung-doo with his high school love interest, Hyun-joo. Byung-doo finds that he still is interested in her and attempts to rekindle their relationship.

Sang-chul becomes aware of Attorney Park's murder and feels threatened by Byung-doo's subversion of his authority and lack of consideration for the organization. He sets up a hit to take out Byung-doo, but Byung-doo learns of this before it occurs and stabs Sang-chul to death, guaranteeing his safety in the short term.

These murders don't leave Byung-doo without heavy emotional baggage, however. When Byung-doo's gangster tendencies frighten Hyun-joo away, Min-ho attempts to console Byung-doo who reveals to Min-ho his darkest secrets, including the hits on both Attorney Park and his former boss, Sang-chul.

Missing Hyun-joo deeply, Byung-doo tries to hide his gangster tendencies to revive their relationship. However, despite his words to Hyun-joo otherwise, Byung-doo is unable to escape the gangster occupation truly. As his rank within the gang escalates, his actions become more violent and cruel, juxtaposing his ever-growing affection for Hyun-joo.

Soon Byung-doo discovers that Min-ho's gangster film reenacts many of the events from Byung-doo's past, including the hit on Attorney Park. Realizing the dangers of the organization being implicated, Byung-doo confronts Min-ho and threatens him never to tell anyone, choosing to spare his life despite pleas from his underlings that he do otherwise. These underlings later decide to take matters into their own hands and threaten Min-ho more seriously than Byung-doo was willing to do, but still spared his life. It is then that Min-ho, deeply disturbed, goes to the police and informs them of the potential threats to his life. The police attempt to arrest Byung-doo but fail. It is then that Byung-doo believes the proper solution is to eliminate Min-ho once and for all. As Min-ho (and his film) have become quite popular, it will not be an easy job – Byung-doo intends to perform the hit and fly out of the country, escaping the consequences of his actions.

Byung-doo moves to assassinate Min-ho at an after-party for his film. Min-ho manages to escape outside where he is captured by Byung-doo's underlings who are supposed to take Min-ho to a planned location for Byung-doo to meet them at. Upon arrival, Byung-doo is attacked by a group of thugs. Despite being outnumbered, Byung-doo manages to stumble away from his attackers, heavily wounded. He appears to be saved as his underlings arrive on the scene, however, they betray Byung-doo and kill him. Notably, Jong-soo, Byung-doo's former right-hand man and his lone accomplice in the Attorney Park murder is present and appears to be leading the betrayal.

A fighting scene from the movie

The scene shifts to a meeting with President Hwang and Min-ho, who appears to be alive and well despite being captured by Byung-doo's men. President Hwang discusses potential movie ideas with Min-ho, saying he can draw inspiration from the stories of his past, though they shouldn't be too close to the truth for as he says, "a fiction should remain a fiction", referencing Min-ho's first movie and its connection to Byung-doo's untimely fate. Soon Jong-soo joins the meeting, taking Byung-doo's position at President Hwang's side, showcasing his subversion much in the same way that Byung-doo subverted his boss, Sang-chul.

The final scene is a repetition from earlier in the film, where Byung-doo visits Min-ho on his movie set to give him advice. Byung-doo encourages Min-ho with the friendly words, "Make something with a real gangster spirit," reinforcing the strength of the friendship and gangster themes running throughout the film.

== Cast ==
- Zo In-sung as Kim Byung-doo
- Namkoong Min as Min-ho
- Lee Bo-young as Hyun-joo
- Jin Goo as Jong-soo
- Chun Ho-jin as President Hwang
- Yoon Je-moon as Sang-chul
- Ha Ji-young as Bookstore employee
- Choi Hyo-eun as Accompanying pianist

== Awards and nominations ==
2006 Chunsa Film Art Awards

- Best New Actress – Lee Bo-young

2006 Blue Dragon Film Awards

- Nomination – Best Director – Yoo Ha
- Nomination – Best Actor – Zo In-sung
- Nomination – Best New Actor – Jin Goo

2006 Korean Film Awards

- Best Actor – Zo In-sung
- Best Editing – Park Gok-ji and Jeong Jin-hee
- Nomination – Best Supporting Actor – Jin Goo
- Nomination – Best Music – Jo Yeong-wook

2007 Asian Film Awards

- Nomination – Best Editing – Park Gok-ji and Jeong Jin-hee

2007 Baeksang Arts Awards

- Nomination – Best Actor – Zo In-sung
- Nomination – Best Screenplay – Yoo Ha
- Nomination – Best New Actor – Jin Goo

2007 Grand Bell Awards

- Nomination – Best Film
- Nomination – Best Actor – Zo In-sung
- Nomination – Best Supporting Actor – Chun Ho-jin
- Nomination – Best Screenplay – Yoo Ha

== See also ==
- Jigarthanda (2014 film), an Indian Tamil-language film loosely based on A Dirty Carnival, itself remade into the Indian films
  - Jigarthanda (2016 film), in Kannada
  - Gaddalakonda Ganesh (2019), in Telugu
  - Bachchhan Paandey (2022), in Hindi
