= Miss Conspirator =

- Hangul: 미쓰 GO
- RR: Misseu GO
- MR: Missŭ GO
- Directed by: Park Chul-kwan
- Written by: Jung Bum-sik; Jung Sik; Choi Moon-suk
- Produced by: Jang So-heong; Kim Chang-a; Kim Myeong-sim
- Starring: Go Hyun-jung; Yoo Hae-jin
- Cinematography: Ryu Eok
- Edited by: Steve M. Choe
- Production company: Film Dorothy
- Distributed by: Next Entertainment World
- Release date: June 21, 2012
- Running time: 115 minutes
- Country: South Korea
- Language: Korean
- Box office: US$3,426,771

Miss Conspirator (Korean: 미쓰 GO; RR: Misseu GO; lit. 'Miss Go') is a 2012 South Korean action comedy film starring Go Hyun-jung as a nerdy, reclusive cartoonist with a severe case of sociophobia who somehow gets mixed up in a drug deal involving one of the biggest organized crime groups in Korea, and is forced to deal with her phobia and interact with others as she runs from the police.

== Plot ==
Chun Soo-ro is a timid, geeky cartoonist with constant panic attacks and has debilitating phobia of all forms of social interaction. In the past, she relied on her sister to help her, but her sister is now about to leave the country. At the Busan port terminal, where her sister has just departed, Soo-ro suddenly suffers another panic attack. At this time, a nun approaches her and helps her take her medication. Later, the nun asks Soo-ro to deliver flowers and a cake to a man that the nun confesses she loves.

Soo-ro unsuspectingly agrees to make the delivery and goes to the hotel room where the man is staying. Nobody answers the door, but the hotel room door is unlocked and slightly ajar. She walks into the hotel room to drop off the delivery, but is shocked to see a man, stabbed to death in a chair. Three other men then enter the hotel room. Soo-ro is able to hide then make a quick escape.

Unbeknownst to Soo-ro, she is now wanted by the police and two of the biggest crime syndicates. The cops believe she is part of a drug dealing operation worth 42 million dollars and the two gangs want to get back the drugs that was supposed to be delivered in the cake box.

With the help of five men she meets who turn her life upside down, Soo-ro slowly transforms into the queen of crime.

== Cast ==
- Go Hyun-jung - Chun Soo-ro
- Yoo Hae-jin - Red Shoes
- Sung Dong-il - Boss Sung
- Lee Moon-sik - Sa Yeong-cheol
- Go Chang-seok - Detective So
- Park Shin-yang - Baek Bong-nam
- Jin Kyung - Miss Go
- Nam Sung-jin - detective
- Ha Jae-sook - Young-shim
- Lee Won-jong - Soo-ro's psychiatrist
- Kim Byung-chul - Dokgaegoori ("Poison Frog")
- Tae In-ho
