= Unexpected Business =

South Korean television show

- Promotional poster for Season 3
- Hangul: 어쩌다 사장
- Hanja: 어쩌다 社長
- RR: Eojjeoda sajang
- MR: Ŏtchŏda sajang
- Genre: Reality
- Starring: Cha Tae-hyun; Zo In-sung
- Country of origin: South Korea
- Original language: Korean
- No. of seasons: 3
- No. of episodes: 38

Production
- Producer: Yoo Ho-jin
- Production locations: Woncheon-ri, Hwacheon County, Gangwon Province (Season 1); Gongsan-myeon, Naju, South Jeolla-do (Season 2); Marina, Monterey, California, United States (Season 3)

Original release
- Network: tvN, Disney+ (Note: For Season 3)
- Release: February 25, 2021 – February 1, 2024

Unexpected Business (Korean: 어쩌다 사장; RR: Eojjeoda sajang) is a South Korean reality show program by tvN starring Cha Tae-hyun and Zo In-sung, who unexpectedly become the bosses of a countryside grocery store for 10 days. They take over the store's operations, such as ringing up purchases and managing inventory, and also serve simple meals and snacks.

Season 1 aired every Thursday at 20:40 (KST) from February 25, 2021, to May 6, 2021. The duo take over the reins of a general store in Woncheon-ri, Gangwon Province, which includes a kitchen and small seating space for customers and local residents to dine, rest and socialise.

Season 2 premiered on February 17, 2022, and aired every Thursday at 20:40 (KST) as well. This time, the duo are in charge of a larger supermarket in Gongsan-myeon, South Jeolla-do, selling a wider variety of goods. It also has a bigger dining area and a butchery section, presenting new challenges to the experienced duo.

Season 3 was released on October 26, 2023, and aired every Thursday at 20:40 (KST) as well. The season is also available for streaming through Disney+. In this season, they are in charge of a Korean supermarket in Marina, a port city located in western United States.

== Guests ==
Various celebrities visit the store as "part-time workers" (Korean: 알바생) to help Cha Tae-hyun and Zo In-sung, many of whom are friends or former co-stars personally invited by the two main cast.

=== Season 1 (2021) ===
Episode(s)	Guest(s)	Notes	Ref.
2–3	Park Bo-young	Day 2	
3–4	Kim Jae-hwa	Day 3	
3–5	Yoon Kyung-ho	Day 3 to Day 4 morning	
4	Park Kyung-hye	Day 3 evening	
5–7	Shin Seung-hwan	Day 4 afternoon to Day 5	
5–7	Park Byung-eun	Day 5 evening	
5–7	Nam Joo-hyuk	Day 5 evening to Day 6 morning	
8–9	Park Inbee	Day 6 afternoon to Day 7 morning	(Note: Park Inbee appeared with her husband Nam Gi-hyeob and her younger sister Park In-ah.)
8–9	Nam Gi-hyeob	Day 6 afternoon to Day 7 morning	(Note: Park Inbee appeared with her husband Nam Gi-hyeob and her younger sister Park In-ah.)
8–9	Park In-ah	Day 6 afternoon to Day 7 morning	(Note: Park Inbee appeared with her husband Nam Gi-hyeob and her younger sister Park In-ah.)
9	Yoon Shi-yoon	Day 8	
9	Dong Hyun-bae	Day 8	
10–11	Jo Bo-ah	Day 9 to Day 10 morning	(Note: Jo Bo-ah was the only guest in Season 1 invited by the production staff.)
11	Hong Kyung-min	Day 10 evening	(Note: Hong Kyung-min was invited as a guest singer for diners to celebrate the final night, but would eventually help out as a part-time worker.)

=== Season 2 (2022) ===
Episode(s)	Guest(s)	Notes	Ref.
1–6	Kim Woo-bin	Day 1 to Day 3	
1–6	Lee Kwang-soo	Day 1 to Day 4	
1–6	Lim Ju-hwan	Day 1 to Day 4	
6	Lee Eun-hyung	Day 4	
6	Hong Hyun-hee	Day 4	
7–8	Shin Seung-hwan	Day 5	
7–10	Yoon Kyung-ho	Day 5 to Day 7	
7–10	Park Hyo-jun	Day 5 to Day 7	
8–10	Seolhyun	Day 6 to Day 7	
9–10	Park Byung-eun	Day 6 to Day 7	
11–12	Han Hyo-joo	Day 8	
11–13	Park Kyung-hye	Day 8 to Day 9	
11–13	Kim Hye-soo	Day 8 to Day 9	
13	Hong Kyung-min	Day 9	

=== Season 3 (2023) ===
Episode(s)	Guest(s)	Notes	Ref.
1–7	Han Hyo-joo	Day 1 to Day 3	
1–14	Yoon Kyung-ho	Day 1 to Day 9	
1–14	Lim Ju-hwan	Day 1 to Day 9	
4–14	Park Byung-eun	Day 2 to Day 9	
6–9	Park Kyung-lim	Day 3 to Day 4	
7–11	Kim Ah-joong	Day 4 to Day 6	
12–14	Park Bo-young	Day 7 to Day 9 afternoon	
12–14	Inbee Park	Day 8 to Day 9 afternoon	
13–14	Hong Kyung-min	Day 9	

== Ratings ==
Unexpected Business : South Korea viewers per episode (millions)

Season	Episode number														Average
Season	1	2	3	4	5	6	7	8	9	10	11	12	13	14	Average
1	1.158	1.277	1.391	1.462	1.493	1.302	1.353	1.335	1.327	1.430	1.607	–			1.376
2	1.711	1.930	1.754	1.754	1.804	1.692	1.581	1.482	1.560	1.429	1.814	1.576	1.352	–	1.649
3	1.484	1.554	1.572	1.451	1.277	1.493	1.291	N/A	N/A	N/A	1.239	1.163	1.236	1.345	TBD

Source: Audience measurement performed nationwide by Nielsen Media Research.

=== Season 1 (2021) ===
Ep.	Original broadcast date	Average audience share (Nielsen Korea)	
Ep.	Original broadcast date	Nationwide	Seoul
1	February 25, 2021	4.138%	4.449%
2	March 4, 2021	5.112%	5.749%
3	March 11, 2021	5.648%	6.503%
4	March 18, 2021	5.689%	5.990%
5	March 25, 2021	5.948%	6.501%
6	April 1, 2021	5.545%	6.053%
7	April 8, 2021	5.323%	6.054%
8	April 15, 2021	5.128%	5.027%
9	April 22, 2021	5.409%	6.081%
10	April 29, 2021	5.817%	6.639%
11	May 6, 2021	6.426%	7.204%
Average		5.471%	6.023%
In the table above, the blue numbers represent the lowest ratings and the red numbers represent the highest ratings.; This show airs on a cable channel/pay TV which normally has a relatively smaller audience compared to free-to-air TV/public broadcasters (KBS, SBS, MBC & EBS).

=== Season 2 (2022) ===
Ep.	Original broadcast date	Average audience share (Nielsen Korea)	
Ep.	Original broadcast date	Nationwide	Seoul
1	February 17, 2022	6.455%	6.720%
2	February 24, 2022	7.535%	8.396%
3	March 3, 2022	7.195%	8.457%
4	March 10, 2022	7.141%	7.707%
5	March 17, 2022	7.236%	7.878%
6	March 31, 2022 (Note: No new episode was aired on March 24, 2022, due to the broadcast of the 2022 FIFA World Cup qualifier match between South Korea and Iran.)	6.506%	6.880%
7	April 7, 2022	6.256%	6.904%
8	April 14, 2022	6.282%	6.761%
9	April 21, 2022	6.100%	6.571%
10	April 28, 2022	5.756%	6.041%
11	May 5, 2022	7.503%	8.002%
12	May 12, 2022	6.798%	7.403%
13	May 19, 2022	5.778%	5.962%
Average		6.657%	7.206%
In the table above, the blue numbers represent the lowest ratings and the red numbers represent the highest ratings.; This show airs on a cable channel/pay TV which normally has a relatively smaller audience compared to free-to-air TV/public broadcasters (KBS, SBS, MBC & EBS).

=== Season 3 (2023) ===
Ep.	Original broadcast date	Average audience share (Nielsen Korea)	
Ep.	Original broadcast date	Nationwide	Seoul
1	October 26, 2023	5.950%	6.407%
2	November 2, 2023	6.555%	6.893%
3	November 9, 2023	6.655%	7.667%
4	November 16, 2023	5.636%	6.248%
5	November 23, 2023	5.095%	5.312%
6	November 30, 2023	5.682%	6.505%
7	December 7, 2023	5.193%	5.494%
8	December 14, 2023	5.814%	N/A
9	December 21, 2023	5.640%	N/A
10	December 28, 2023	5.305%	N/A
11	January 4, 2024	5.220%	5.910%
12	January 11, 2024	4.988%	5.508%
13	January 18, 2024	4.943%	5.240%
14	February 1, 2024 (Note: Originally scheduled to air on January 25, 2024, the final episode was cancelled due to the broadcast of South Korea's match against Malaysia in 2023 AFC Asian Cup.)	5.308%	5.462%
Average		—	—
In the table above, the blue numbers represent the lowest ratings and the red numbers represent the highest ratings.; This show airs on a cable channel/pay TV which normally has a relatively smaller audience compared to free-to-air TV/public broadcasters (KBS, SBS, MBC & EBS).

== Awards and nominations ==
Award ceremony	Year	Category	Nominee / Work	Result	Ref.
Cable TV Broadcasting Awards	2022	Star Award	Unexpected Business	Won	
