= A Little Love Never Hurts =

South Korean weekend television series

- Promotional poster
- Also known as: Give Love Away; Love Doesn't Go Away
- Hangul: 사랑해서 남주나
- RR: Saranghaeseo nam juna
- MR: Saranghaesŏ nam chuna
- Genre: Romantic comedy Family drama
- Written by: Choi Hyun-kyung
- Directed by: Kim Nam-won; Choi Byung-gil
- Starring: Hong Soo-hyun; Lee Sang-yeob; Shin Da-eun; Seo Ji-seok
- Country of origin: South Korea
- Original language: Korean
- No. of episodes: 50

Production
- Executive producer: Yoon Jae-moon
- Production company: iWill Media

Original release
- Network: MBC TV
- Release: September 28, 2013 – March 30, 2014

A Little Love Never Hurts (Korean: 사랑해서 남주나; lit. 'Will You Love and Give it Away?') was a South Korean weekend television drama series starring Hong Soo-hyun, Lee Sang-yeob, Shin Da-eun and Seo Ji-seok. It aired on MBC from September 28, 2013, to March 30, 2014, on Saturdays and Sundays at 20:40 for 50 episodes.

== Cast ==
- Hong Soo-hyun as Song Mi-joo
- Lee Sang-yeob as Jung Jae-min
- Shin Da-eun as Eun Ha-kyung
- Seo Ji-seok as Eun Ha-rim
- Park Geun-hyung as Jung Hyun-soo
- Cha Hwa-yeon as Hong Soon-ae
- Choi Su-rin as Shin Soo-jung
- Yoo Ho-jeong as Jung Yoo-jin
- Kim Seung-soo as Kang Sung-hoon
- Han Go-eun as Jung Yoo-ra
- Kang Seok-woo as Song Ho-seob
- Yu Ji-in as Lee Hye-sin
- Nam Bo-ra as Song Eun-joo
- Yoon Park as Kim Joon-sung
- Kim Na-woon as Lee Yeon-hee
- Choi Jung-woo as Eun Hee-jae
- Jung Jae-soon as Eun Hee-ja
- Seo Dong-won as Song Byung-joo
- Oh Na-ra as Kim Ji-young
- Cho Yeon-woo as Jang Yoon-chul
