= Go Hyun-jung =

South Korean actress (born 1971)

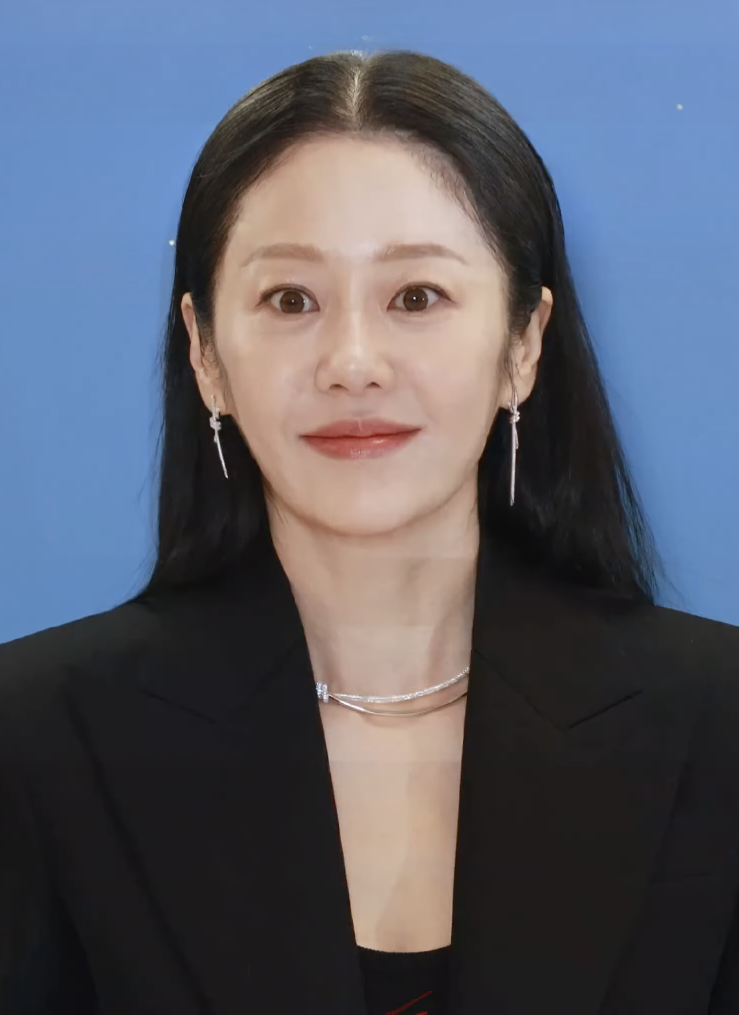
- Go in December 2024
- Born: March 2, 1971 (age 55); Hwasun, South Korea
- Education: Dongguk University (Performing Arts)
- Occupation: Actress
- Years active: 1989–1995; 2004–present
- Agent: IOK Company
- Spouse: Chung Yong-jin (m. 1995; div. 2003)
- Children: 2
- Beauty pageant titleholder
- Title: Miss World Korea 1990
- Major competition: Miss Korea 1989 (1st Runner-Up)

Korean name
- Hangul: 고현정
- Hanja: 高賢廷
- RR: Go Hyeonjeong
- MR: Ko Hyŏnjŏng

Go Hyun-jung (Korean: 고현정; born March 2, 1971) is a South Korean actress and beauty pageant titleholder. She debuted in the entertainment industry as a Miss Korea runner-up in 1989 and went on to star in Sandglass (1995), one of the highest-rated and critically acclaimed dramas in Korean television history. She retired after marrying chaebol Chung Yong-jin in 1995, then returned to acting after their divorce in 2003. Go has since regained her top star status in Korea, becoming the highest-paid actress on TV after the success of her series' Queen Seondeok (2009) and Big Thing (2010).

== Life and career ==
=== Early career and retirement ===
Go Hyun-jung graduated from Dongguk University with a degree in Performing Arts. She was a runner-up in the Miss Korea pageant in 1989, which launched her acting career. Her big break came in the 1995 SBS drama Sandglass. The drama dealt with modern Korean history from 1970 to the 1990s and was one of the highest rated dramas in Korean television history, with average ratings of 50.8% and a peak of 64.5%. People would rush home just to see a new episode, saying "it's time to go home," which meant they had to go home to watch Sandglass. However, following her marriage, Go announced her retirement from the industry.

=== Television comeback and films ===
She staged a comeback in the 2005 melodrama Spring Day, which she followed up with May–December romantic comedy What's Up Fox? and police procedural H.I.T.

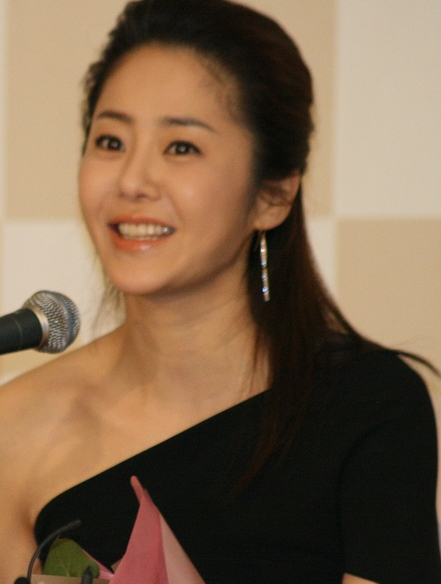
Go in January 2006

Not content with her small screen success, Go began her late-blooming movie career by going against her image and taking pay cuts to star in non-mainstream films. She was part of the ensemble cast in arthouse films Woman on the Beach and Like You Know It All by auteur Hong Sang-soo. She then starred in Actresses, a semi-improvisational movie featuring six actresses each playing themselves. Director E J-yong, who was first inspired to make the film after going out for a drink with actresses Youn Yuh-jung and Go in 2007, said he focused on conveying the "reality" of the actresses' lives.

=== Career resurgence ===
Go regained her reputation as Korea's top actress in 2009 after playing femme fatale royal concubine Lady Mishil in the hit historical drama Queen Seondeok. She was not the titular lead character, but her interpretation of the power-hungry main rival to the queen was impressive enough to make viewers remember the show as Mishil's story. The drama reached ratings of over 40 percent and won her the highest award at the MBC Drama Awards and Baeksang Arts Awards. Go was named Gallup Korea's Television Actor of the Year for two consecutive years (2009–10).

That same year, Go surprised fans not only by appearing on a TV entertainment show (popular talk show Golden Fishery hosted by comedian Kang Ho-dong) for the first time in 15 years, but also by frankly addressing rumors surrounding her personal life. Once notorious for declining to appear on entertainment programs other than dramas or films, she maintained a mysterious image for a long time. Her new easy-going, and down-to-earth attitude seemingly reflected a philosophical view of the many ups and downs in life. In interviews with print and online magazines, Go has expressed her feelings towards her ex-husband and children.

Twenty-one years after making her acting debut, Go held her very first fanmeeting on June 13, 2010—she held a press conference beforehand, sang songs for the 500 fans present, answered questions, and prepared video clips.

Though plagued with production issues prior to airing, Go returned to television ten months later in Daemul, which means "big shot" or "big thing" in Korean. In the drama, Go plays Seo Hye-rim, an anchorwoman who enters politics after the death of her war correspondent husband and becomes the nation's first female president. The 24-episode series revolves around an ordinary woman in extraordinary circumstances: how and why she became head of state and also the complicated schemes and plots surrounding her, her presidency, allies, and enemies. Besides its star-studded cast (Go starred opposite Korean Wave star Kwon Sang-woo), the show's ratings was helped by its controversial plot, which included events from Korea's recent past such as a presidential impeachment and the sinking of a Navy warship, and it topped its time slot for 11 consecutive weeks. Go repeated her feat by winning the top prize at the 2010 SBS Drama Awards. According to industry sources, Go was reportedly paid ₩55 million (US$51,000) per episode, setting a new salary record for a Korean actress.

Go also narrated the SBS documentary The Last Tundra - Movie Edition (also known as The Final Tundra - Cinema Edition) which offered a rare glimpse into the life of the Nenets, the last reindeer herding nomads living in the Siberian tundra.

2012's Miss Go (international title: Miss Conspirator) was her first commercial film, and the first film she headlined. The action comedy is about a nerdy, reclusive cartoonist with a severe case of sociophobia who somehow gets mixed up in a drug deal involving one of the biggest organized crime groups in Korea, and is forced to deal with her phobia and interact with others as she runs from the police.

Go returned to television in 2013 with The Queen's Classroom, a remake of the 2005 Japanese drama Jyoou no Kyoushitsu. The story depicts the struggle between a ferocious and ruthless elementary school teacher and her class.

In 2016, Go starred in the family melodrama Dear My Friends, playing a freelance translator, a complex and sometimes abrasive character, who observes the lives of the old people surrounding her.

In 2017, Go announced her return to the big screen with A Winter Guest Scarier than a Tiger, by acclaimed indie filmmaker Lee Kwang-kuk.

In 2018, Go starred in the legal thriller drama Return. The drama revolves around a murder case that involves powerful members of an elite class, with Go playing the role of a rags-to-riches lawyer with secrets. However halfway through the series, it was announced that she dropped out due to irreconcilable differences with the PD.

In early 2019, Go starred in the second season of My Lawyer, Mr. Jo, alongside Park Shin-yang.

In 2021, more than two years after her last project, Go returned to the small-screen with Reflection of You, a JTBC melodrama based on a novel by Jung So-hyeon.

== Other activities ==
In 2010, after her contract ended with De Chocolate E&TF, she set up her own talent agency with her brother, Go Byung-cheol, as CEO, called IOK Company. In 2012, her Spring Day co-star and close friend, Zo In-sung, also signed on.

She published a book on skincare titled Go Hyun-jung's Texture in 2011. The actress has always been admired for her youthful appearance, largely attributed to her healthy skin which had made fans wonder about her beauty secrets. The book, arranged in the format of a documentary, contains Go's own philosophy on beauty classified under six themes—texture, color, light, line, formality, and scent—as well as her ideas on leading a sound and healthy lifestyle in general. The book is co-written by another writer who observed the actress's everyday life for six months, describing it in detail. The book became a bestseller, with all 30,000 copies of the first edition selling out in just two days of release.

At the press event for her eponymously named talk show GO Show (which premiered on April 6, 2012), Go quipped, "I became an MC because I wanted to. I want to meet a lot of people and hear their stories. I have always wanted to do that and SBS gave me that opportunity." Given her reputation for saying what is on her mind (one that has won the actress many fans), concerns arose as to how her work as show host would affect the impressive image of flawless elegance and sophistication she has gained over the years. But Go harbored little anxiety over how her public image might change, saying, "I think I can afford to put a small dent in my image and have some fun." Co-hosted by singer-songwriter Yoon Jong-shin, and comedians Jung Hyung-don and Kim Young-chul, the talk show was cancelled after eight months on the air.

In 2014, she began teaching acting at her alma mater Dongguk University, as an adjunct professor in the theater department. Back in 2006, she donated a ₩100 million scholarship fund to the school.

Go also launched her own fashion brand, atti.k, a label that sells clothes, shoes, and bags. In the following year, Go then launched her own cosmetics line, koY.

In 2015, Go starred in her own reality show, which tracks her trip to Tokyo and films her preparation to launch a travel book.

== Personal life ==
In May 1995, at the peak of her career, Go married Chung Yong-jin, vice chairman and CEO of Shinsegae Group and grandson of Samsung founder Lee Byung-chul. The two first met in New York, purely by coincidence, when Chung had offered to help Go find her seat at the Winter Garden Theatre because her English was so bad. After the most talked-about wedding in Korea at the time, Go announced her retirement from acting to focus on her new role as a chaebol's wife. They had two children together, Haechan (born in 1998) and Haein (born in 2000).

After eight years of marriage, a messy divorce followed in November 2003, during which she lost complete custody of her children. Two years after the divorce, Shinsegae passed down a ruling stating that none of its department stores would be allowed to display any Go-related material, including any of her product endorsements.

== Filmography ==
=== Film ===
Year	Title	Role	Notes	Ref.
2006	Woman on the Beach	Kim Mun-suk		
2009	Like You Know It All	Go Soon		
2009	Actresses	Herself	Also credited as co-screenwriter	
2011	The Last Tundra - Movie Edition	Documentary narrator		
2011	The Day He Arrives	Cinema fan (cameo)		
2012	Miss Conspirator	Chun Soo-ro		
2018	A Tiger in Winter	Yoo-jeong		

=== Television series ===
Year	Title	Role	Notes	Ref.
1990	Love on a Jujube Tree	Hwang Mal-sook		
1991	Maengnangsidae	Shin-ae		
1991	Eyes of Dawn	Ahn Myeong-ji		
1992	A Love Without Fear	Shin Kyung-ae		
1992	Women's Room	Yoon Hee-soo		
1992	Winter Rainbow	Mi-ae		
1993	My Mother's Sea	Kim Young-seo		
1994	Farewell	Kim Ye-rim		
1995	Sandglass	Yoon Hye-rin		
2005	Spring Day	Seo Jung-eun		
2006	What's Up Fox?	Go Byung-hee		
2007	H.I.T	Lt. Cha Soo-kyung		
2009	Queen Seondeok	Mishil		
2010	Big Thing	Seo Hye-rim		
2013	The Queen's Classroom	Ma Yeo-jin		
2016	Dear My Friends	Park Wan		
2018	Return	Choi Ja-hye	Episode 1–15	
2019	My Lawyer, Mr. Jo 2: Crime and Punishment	Lee Ja-Gyeong		
2021	Reflection of You	Jeong Hee-joo		
2023	Mask Girl	Kim Mo-mi		
2024	Namib	Kang Soo-hyun		
2025	Queen Mantis	Jung Yi-shin		

=== Television shows ===
Year	Title	Role	Ref.
1990	With Viewers (시청자와 함께)		
1990	Family Arcade		
1990	Show! Saturday Express (쇼 토요특급)	Host	
1991	Saturday March (토요 대행진)	Host	
1994	Between Night and Music		
2010	Beop Jeong: May All Beings Be Happy (법정 – 살아있는 것은 다 행복하라)	Documentary narrator	
2010	The Last Tundra (최후의 툰드라)	Documentary narrator	
2012	Go Show	Host	
2022	Guardians of the Tundra	Narrator	

== Discography ==
=== Studio albums ===
List of albums showing selected details
Title	Details
Strange Happiness (낯선 행복)	Released: March 1994; Label: Pearl Records; Formats: CD; Track listing: 1. 처음 만날때부터; 2. 낯선 행복; 3. 가장 슬픈일; 4. 일기 I 5. 당신을 사랑합니다; 6. 그대는 참 좋겠네; 7. 나의 빛 8. 그 남자는; 9. 일기 II; 10. 눈동자를 위한 소나타; 11. 너를 보내고

=== Soundtrack appearances ===
List of soundtrack appearances, showing year released, and name of the album
Title	Year	Album
"아직도 우리곁에는" (Sung by Kim Dong-hwan, Kang In-won, Go Hyun-jung, and Lee Jae-jin))	1990	Watercolor Painting in a Rainy Day 2 OST
"언제나 아침이면" (Sung by Go Hyun-jung and Lee Jae-jin)	1990	Watercolor Painting in a Rainy Day 2 OST
"처음 만날때부터"	1990	Watercolor Painting in a Rainy Day 2 OST
"가장 슬픈 일"	1995	三人三色
"당신을 사랑합니다"	1995	三人三色
"그 남자는"	1995	三人三色

== Bibliography ==
Year	Title	Publisher	ISBN
2011	Go Hyun-jung's Texture (Beauty Documentary)	Joongang M&B	ISBN 978-89-6456-149-2

== Accolades ==
=== Awards and nominations ===
Name of the award ceremony, year presented, category, nominee of the award, and the result of the nomination
Award ceremony	Year	Category	Nominee / Work	Result	Ref.
Baeksang Arts Awards	1992	Best New Actress – Television	Love on a Jujube Tree	Won	
Baeksang Arts Awards	1994	Best Actress – Television	My Mother's Sea	Nominated	
Baeksang Arts Awards	1995	Best Actress – Television	Sandglass	Nominated	
Baeksang Arts Awards	2005	Best Actress – Television	Spring Day	Nominated	
Baeksang Arts Awards	2007	Best New Actress – Film	Woman on the Beach	Nominated	
Baeksang Arts Awards	2010	Grand Prize (Daesang) – Television	Queen Seondeok	Won	
Baeksang Arts Awards	2010	Best Actress – Television	Queen Seondeok	Nominated	
Broadcaster Awards	2009	Best Actress	Queen Seondeok	Won	
Busan Film Critics Awards	2006	Best New Actress	Woman on the Beach	Won	
Cine21 Film Awards	2006	Best New Actress	Woman on the Beach	Won	
Director's Cut Awards	2024	Best Actress in a Series	Mask Girl	Nominated	
Grand Bell Awards	2007	Best New Actress	Woman on the Beach	Nominated	
Grand Bell Awards	2023	Best Actress in a Series	Mask Girl	Nominated	
Job Korea	2009	Actress of the Year	Queen Seondeok	Won	
KBS Drama Awards	2019	Excellence Award, Actress in a Mid-length Drama	My Lawyer, Mr. Jo 2: Crime and Punishment	Nominated	
KBS Drama Awards	2019	Top Excellence Award, Actress	My Lawyer, Mr. Jo 2: Crime and Punishment	Nominated	
Korea Broadcasting Awards	2010	Best Actress	Queen Seondeok	Won	
Korea Drama Awards	2013	Grand Prize (Daesang)	The Queen's Classroom	Nominated	
Korea Producers & Directors' (PD) Awards	2010	Best Performer, TV Actress category	Queen Seondeok	Won	
Korean Film Awards	2006	Best Actress	Woman on the Beach	Nominated	
Korean Film Awards	2006	Best New Actress	Woman on the Beach	Nominated	
MBC Drama Awards	1993	Excellence Award, Actress	My Mother's Sea	Won	
MBC Drama Awards	2006	Top Excellence Award, Actress	What's Up Fox?	Nominated	
MBC Drama Awards	2007	Top Excellence Award, Actress	H.I.T	Nominated	
MBC Drama Awards	2009	Grand Prize (Daesang)	Queen Seondeok	Won	
MBC Drama Awards	2009	Top Excellence Award, Actress	Queen Seondeok	Nominated	
MBC Drama Awards	2013	Top Excellence Award, Actress in a Miniseries	The Queen's Classroom	Nominated	
Miss Korea Pageant	1989	First Runner-up (Miss World Korea)	Go Hyun-jung	Won	
SBS Drama Awards	2000	Big Star Award	Go Hyun-jung	Won	
SBS Drama Awards	2005	Top 10 Star	Spring Day	Won	
SBS Drama Awards	2005	Top Excellence Award, Actress	Spring Day	Nominated	
SBS Drama Awards	2010	Grand Prize (Daesang)	Daemul	Won	
SBS Drama Awards	2010	Top 10 Star	Daemul	Won	
SBS Drama Awards	2010	Top Excellence Award, Actress in a Drama Special	Daemul	Nominated	
SBS Drama Awards	2025	Top Excellence Award, Actress in a Miniseries Genre/Action Drama	Queen Mantis	Won	
Seoul International Drama Awards	2010	Outstanding Korean Actress	Queen Seondeok	Won	
tvN10 Awards	2016	Best Actress	Dear My Friends	Nominated	

=== Listicles ===
Name of publisher, year listed, name of listicle, and placement
Publisher	Year	Listicle	Placement	Ref.
Forbes	2010	Korea Power Celebrity 40	6th	
Forbes	2011	Korea Power Celebrity 40	20th	
