= Shin Da-eun =

South Korean actress (born 1985)

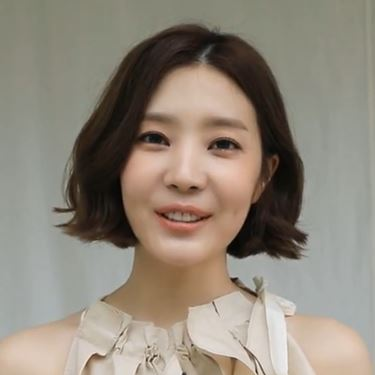
- Shin in 2016
- Born: January 7, 1985 (age 41); South Korea
- Education: Sangmyung University - Theater
- Occupation: Actress
- Years active: 2007—present
- Agent: ELRIS Entertainment
- Spouse: Im Sung-bin (m. 2016)
- Children: 1

Korean name
- Hangul: 신다은
- RR: Sin Daeun
- MR: Sin Taŭn

Shin Da-eun (Korean: 신다은; born January 7, 1985) is a South Korean actress. She starred in the television series The Sons (2012), A Little Love Never Hurts (2013) and The Return of Hwang Geum-bok (2015).

== Personal life ==
In 2016, she married designer Im Sung-bin. On December 6, 2021, Shin announced on her Instagram that she was pregnant after 5 years of marriage.

On April 22, 2022, it was confirmed that Shin had given birth to her first son.

== Filmography ==
=== Television series ===
Year	Title	Role	Network
2007	Drama City: "What is a Prestigious University?"	Byun Tae-yi	KBS2
2007	New Heart	Kim Mi-mi	MBC
2008	I Am Happy	Jjong-ah	SBS
2008	Family's Honor	Oh Jin-ah	SBS
2010	Becoming a Billionaire	Han So-jung	KBS2
2011	KBS Drama Special: "Identical Criminals"	Kim Sang-mi	KBS2
2011	KBS Drama Special: "Lethal Move"	Young-se	KBS2
2011	If Tomorrow Comes	Oh Soo-jung	SBS
2011	Lights and Shadows	Kang Myung-hee	MBC
2012	The Innocent Man	Gold Digger (Cameo, Episode 1)	KBS2
2012	The Sons	Han Song-hee	MBC
2013	A Little Love Never Hurts	Eun Ha-kyung	MBC
2014	Drama Festival: "Turning Point"	Yeom Soo-jung	MBC
2015	The Return of Hwang Geum-bok	Hwang Geum-bok	SBS
2017	You Are Too Much	Jung Hae-jin	MBC
2017	Reverse	Kim In-young	MBC
2019	Shady Mom-in-Law	Jenny Han / Choi Kyung-ah	SBS

=== Film ===
Year	Title	Role
2010	Midnight FM	Ko Ah-young
2011	The Cat	Bo-hee
2013	11 A.M.	Namgoong Sook

=== Music video appearances ===
Year	Song title	Artist
2007	"One Sweet Day"	Jang Yeon-joo
2009	"Pomp and Circumstance"	Maya
2011	"You Are My Everything"	Flower

== Theater ==
Year	Title	Role
2004	Lunatic	
2007	Closer	Ji-hyun
2009–2010	Special Letter	Oh Soon-kyu
2010	Closer	Alice
2011	Happiness	Wife
2014–2015	The Days	She

== Awards and nominations ==
Year	Award	Category	Nominated work	Result
2012	31st MBC Drama Awards	Excellence Award, Actress in a Special Project Drama	Lights and Shadows	Nominated
2015	23rd SBS Drama Awards	Excellence Award, Actress in a Serial Drama	The Return of Hwang Geum-bok	Nominated
2017	36th MBC Drama Awards	Excellence Award, Actress in a Soap Opera	Reverse	Nominated
2019	27th SBS Drama Awards	Top Excellence Award, Actress in a Serial Drama	Shady Mom-in-Law	Nominated
