= List of 2017 box office number-one films in South Korea =

The following is a list of 2017 box office number-one films in South Korea. When the number-one film in gross is not the same as the number-one film in admissions, both are listed.

#	Date	Film	Gross	Notes
1	January 8, 2017	Your Name.	US$5.86 million	
2	January 15, 2017	Moana	US$5.23 million	
3	January 22, 2017	The King	US$13.2 million	
4	January 29, 2017	Confidential Assignment	US$14.2 million	
5	February 5, 2017	Confidential Assignment	US$7.8 million	
6	February 12, 2017	Fabricated City	US$6.6 million	
7	February 19, 2017	New Trial	US$5.5 million	
8	February 26, 2017	Split	US$6.2 million	
9	March 5, 2017	Logan	US$8.1 million	
10	March 12, 2017	Kong: Skull Island	US$6.2 million	
11	March 19, 2017	Beauty and the Beast	US$11.8 million	
12	March 26, 2017	Beauty and the Beast	US$7.8 million	
13	April 2, 2017	Beauty and the Beast	US$4.8 million	
14	April 9, 2017	Beauty and the Beast	US$2.6 million	
15	April 16, 2017	The Fate of the Furious	US$8 million	
16	April 23, 2017	The Fate of the Furious	US$5.2 million	
17	April 30, 2017	The Mayor	US$4.4 million	
18	May 7, 2017	Guardians of the Galaxy Vol. 2	US$6.9 million	
19	May 14, 2017	Alien: Covenant	US$4 million	
20	May 21, 2017	Get Out	US$6.1 million	
21	May 28, 2017	Pirates of the Caribbean: Dead Men Tell No Tales	US$8.9 million	
22	June 4, 2017	Wonder Woman	US$6.4 million	
23	June 11, 2017	The Mummy	US$8.6 million	
24	June 18, 2017	The Mummy	US$3.7 million	
25	June 25, 2017	Transformers: The Last Knight	US$9.5 million	
26	July 2, 2017	Anarchist from Colony	US$5.8 million	
27	July 9, 2017	Spider-Man: Homecoming	US$25.5 million	
28	July 16, 2017	Spider-Man: Homecoming	US$10.5 million	
29	July 23, 2017	Dunkirk	US$8.8 million	
30	July 30, 2017	The Battleship Island	US$18.5 million	
31	August 6, 2017	A Taxi Driver	US$21.5 million	
32	August 13, 2017	A Taxi Driver	US$13.1 million	
33	August 20, 2017	A Taxi Driver	US$7.0 million	
34	August 27, 2017	V.I.P.	US$4.5 million	
35	September 3, 2017	The Hitman's Bodyguard	US$4.3 million	
36	September 10, 2017	Memoir of a Murderer	US$6.6 million	
37	September 17, 2017	Memoir of a Murderer	US$3.6 million	
38	September 24, 2017	I Can Speak	US$4.4 million	
39	October 1, 2017	Kingsman: The Golden Circle	US$11.8 million	
40	October 8, 2017	The Fortress	US$9.7 million	
41	October 15, 2017	The Outlaws	US$7.2 million	
42	October 22, 2017	The Outlaws	US$6.0 million	
43	October 29, 2017	Thor: Ragnarok	US$11.9 million	
44	November 5, 2017	Thor: Ragnarok	US$6.4 million	
45	November 12, 2017	Thor: Ragnarok	US$3.5 million	
46	November 19, 2017	Justice League	US$6.4 million	
47	November 26, 2017	The Swindlers	US$9.1 million	
48	December 3, 2017	The Swindlers	US$5.1 million	
49	December 10, 2017	The Swindlers	US$3.2 million	
50	December 17, 2017	Steel Rain	US$10.5 million	
51	December 24, 2017	Along With the Gods: The Two Worlds	US$21.2 million	
52	December 31, 2017	Along With the Gods: The Two Worlds	US$19.2 million	

== Highest-grossing films ==
As of December 31, 2017

Highest-grossing films of 2017 (by admissions)
Rank	Title	Country	Admissions**	Domestic gross
1.	A Taxi Driver	South Korea	12,186,327	US$89.7 million
2.	Along With the Gods: The Two Worlds*	South Korea	8,539,524	US$64.3 million
3.	Confidential Assignment	South Korea	7,817,631	US$59.7 million
4.	Spider-Man: Homecoming	United States	7,258,678	US$55.3 million
5.	The Outlaws	South Korea	6,879,844	US$52.7 million
6.	The Battleship Island	South Korea	6,592,151	US$47.3 million
7.	Midnight Runners	South Korea	5,653,270	US$41.5 million
8.	The King	South Korea	5,317,383	US$40.7 million
9.	Beauty and the Beast	United States	5,138,330	US$39.4 million
10.	Kingsman: The Golden Circle	United Kingdom; United States	4,945,486	US$38.4 million

Highest-grossing domestic films of 2017 (by admissions)
Rank	Title	Admissions**	Domestic gross
1.	A Taxi Driver	12,186,327	US$89.7 million
2.	Along With the Gods: The Two Worlds*	8,539,524	US$64.3 million
3.	Confidential Assignment	7,817,631	US$59.7 million
4.	The Outlaws	6,879,844	US$52.7 million
5.	The Battleship Island	6,592,151	US$47.3 million
6.	Midnight Runners	5,653,270	US$41.5 million
7.	The King	5,317,383	US$40.7 million
8.	The Swindlers*	4,018,035	US$29.3 million
9.	Steel Rain*	4,013,336	US$29.9 million
10.	The Fortress	3,849,087	US$29.2 million

- *Continue to screening in 2018
- **Admissions showed was not total admissions, but admissions by the last day of the year.

== See also ==
- List of South Korean films of 2017
