= H.I.T (TV series) =

2007 Korean television series

- Promotional poster
- Genre: Procedural drama
- Written by: Kim Young-hyun; Park Sang-yeon
- Directed by: Yoo Chul-yong; Kim Young-min
- Starring: Go Hyun-jung; Ha Jung-woo; Kim Jung-min; Yoon Ji-min
- Opening theme: "Success" by Super Junior
- Country of origin: South Korea
- Original language: Korean
- No. of episodes: 20

Production
- Producer: Lee Eun-gyu
- Running time: 60 minutes
- Production company: Kim Jong-hak Production

Original release
- Network: Munhwa Broadcasting Corporation
- Release: March 19 – May 22, 2007

H.I.T (Korean: 히트; RR: Hiteu), also known as Homicide Investigation Team, is a 2007 South Korean television series starring Go Hyun-jung, Ha Jung-woo, Kim Jung-min, and Yoon Ji-min. It aired on MBC from March 19 to May 22, 2007 on Mondays and Tuesdays at 21:55 for 20 episodes. A police procedural crime drama that integrated crime scene analysis with action, suspense, and romance, H.I.T represented a departure from the usual Korean drama subjects of love and relationships.

== Plot ==
Tough, sharp-shooting, and just a bit unkempt, Cha Soo-kyung (Go Hyun-jung) is the leader of Investigation Team 1 at the Seoul Metropolitan Police Agency. She is haunted by her failure, years ago, to catch a serial killer who wound up murdering her fiancé and escaping. When a new serial killer whose crimes resemble the old killer's surfaces in Seoul, Cha is appointed as the first female detective to head H.I.T, the Homicide Investigation Team, charged with capturing the murderer. Soo-kyung's work is her life, and she is most comfortable when she is with her team. Because of her determination and work ethic, she immediately clashes with newly appointed D.A. Kim Jae-yoon (Ha Jung-woo) from the Prosecutor's Office who was assigned to work for H.I.T. Jae-yoon is a laid-back playboy whose greatest priority is to enjoy life. Despite their differences and personal conflicts, the two make a surprisingly formidable crime-fighting duo, and slowly realize that they have a lot to learn from each other. Soo-kyung must overcome her past and her grief for her dead boyfriend, and come to terms with her feelings for Jae-yoon.

== Cast ==
=== Main characters ===
- Go Hyun-jung as Cha Soo-kyung

Cha Soo-kyung is a lieutenant of Investigation Team 1 at the Seoul Metropolitan Police Agency, and the first female chief of homicide.

- Ha Jung-woo as Kim Jae-yoon
  - Kang Soo-han as young Kim Jae-yoon

Kim Jae-yoon is a rookie district attorney at the Prosecutor's Office. He is single and an individualist who believes life is about having fun.

- Kim Jung-min as Kim Yong-doo

Kim Yong-doo is a 40-year-old ex-cop who currently runs a bar.

- Yoon Ji-min as Jung In-hee

Jung In-hee is a doctor at the National Institute of Scientific Investigation, specializing in hypnosis.

=== Supporting characters ===
- Son Hyun-joo as Superintendent Jo Gyu-won
- Ma Dong-seok as Detective Nam Seong-shik
- Jung Eun-woo as Detective Kim Il-joo
- Kim Jung-tae as Detective Shim Jong-geum
- Choi Il-hwa as Detective Jang Yong-hwa
- Lee Young-ha as D.A. Jung Taek-won, In-hee's father
- Jung Sun-woo as Yeo Soon-kyung
- Seo Hyun-jin as Jang Hee-jin, Detective Jang's daughter
- Song Kwi-hyun as Chief of Police
- Jo Kyung-hwan as Police Commissioner
- Yoon Seo-hyun as Jung Man-soo
- Ji Sang-ryul as Kang Yong-pil
- Jeon Young-bin as Kim Jung-bin
- Son Il-kwon as Shin Chang-soo
- Um Hyo-sup as Shin Il-young
- Oh Yeon-seo as Son Seong-ok
- Yoon Joo-hee as nurse
- Joo Min-ha
- Na Kyung-mi
- Son Young-soon
- Choi In-sook
- Han Young-kwang
- Lee Hae-in
- Jung Jin-gak
- Jung Kyung-ho as Lee Hae-kang (guest appearance, ep 4)
- Jung Ho-bin (guest appearance)
- Kim Bu-seon (guest appearance)
- Jung Doo-hong (cameo appearance)
- Jo Jae-yoon

== International broadcast ==
- It aired in Vietnam on HTV3 beginning July 3, 2010.
