= Bride of the Sun =

2011 South Korean television series

- Also known as: The Sun's Bride
- Genre: Melodrama; Revenge; Romance
- Written by: Yoon Young-mi
- Directed by: Lee Chang-min
- Starring: Jang Shin-young; Jung Eun-woo; Han Jin-hee
- Music by: Park Se-jun
- Opening theme: 지켜줄게
- Ending theme: 사랑하지마
- Country of origin: South Korea
- Original language: Korean
- No. of episodes: 112

Production
- Executive producers: Kim Jung-min; Park Hyeong-ki
- Production location: Korea
- Running time: Mondays to Fridays at 08:40 (KST)

Original release
- Network: SBS TV
- Release: 24 October 2011 – 30 March 2012

Bride of the Sun (Korean: 태양의 신부; RR: Taeyangui sinbu) is a 2011 South Korean television series starring Jang Shin-young, Jung Eun-woo, Han Jin-hee, Yeon Mi-joo, and Song Yoo-ha. The morning soap opera aired on SBS on Mondays to Fridays at 8:40 a.m. from October 24, 2011, to March 30, 2012, for 112 episodes.

The story is loosely based on Jang Eun-young, a Miss Korea runner-up turned KBS news announcer who made headlines in 1999 when she married former Dongah Group chairman Choi Won-suk who was 27 years her senior; it was his third marriage. Jang and Choi divorced in 2010.

== Plot ==
Kim Hyo Won, a simple girl with a pure heart, is working hard to get her family out of poverty. Because of her family's financial struggles, Kim Hyo-won (Jang Shin-young) leaves her boyfriend Choi Jin-hyuk (Jung Eun-woo), and marries Lee Kang-ro (Han Jin-hee), a wealthy man old enough to be her grandfather. She works as an executive at her new husband's resort, and gets along well with everyone. Despite this, she has difficulty adjusting to her new life, since her stepdaughter resents her and she doesn't get along with her in-laws and Kang-ro's ex-wife. Her stepdaughter dates Choi Jin-Hyuk and is jealous of Kim Hyo Won. Along the journey, Hyo Won adjusts and becomes a more headstrong, complicated girl, and it seems like she is never going back to the girl she was before.

Jin-hyuk was raised by adoptive parents in America and became successful in the hotel business. But he's never forgotten watching his biological parents die in a fire when he was five years old. When he learns that Kang-ro was responsible for his parents' death, he decides to take his revenge. Jin-hyuk plans on taking away everything from Kang-ro, including Hyo-won, whom he still loves.

== Cast ==
- Jang Shin-young as Kim Hyo-won
- Jung Eun-woo as Choi Jin-hyuk
- Han Jin-hee as Lee Kang-ro
- Maeng Sang-hoon as Kim Hak-gu
- Moon Hee-kyung as Gong Kyung-sook
- Yeon Mi-joo as Lee Ye-ryun
- Kim Chung as Jung In-sook
- Bang Eun-hee as Im Mi-sun
- Song Yoo-ha as Baek Kyung-woo
- Son Byong-ho as Park Tae-ho
- Park Seul-ki as Eun-jin
- Yeom Ji-yoon as office head Hwang
- Kang Han-byeol as Kim Yoo-min
