= The Return of Hwang Geum-bok =

2015 South Korean television series

- Promotional poster
- Also known as: Returned and Revenged
- Hangul: 돌아온 황금복
- RR: Doraon Hwang Geumbok
- MR: Toraon Hwang Kŭmbok
- Genre: Melodrama; Romance; Family; Revenge
- Written by: Ma Joo-hee
- Directed by: Yoon Ryu-hae
- Starring: Shin Da-eun; Lee Elijah; Kim Jin-woo; Jung Eun-woo
- Country of origin: South Korea
- Original language: Korean
- No. of episodes: 125

Production
- Executive producers: Park Young-soo; Kim Yong-jin
- Producer: Min Young-hong
- Running time: 38 minutes every Mondays to Fridays at 19:20 (KST)
- Production company: SBS Plus

Original release
- Network: SBS
- Release: 5 April – 31 December 2015

The Return of Hwang Geum-bok (Korean: 돌아온 황금복) is a 2015 South Korean daily drama starring Shin Da-eun, Lee Elijah, Kim Jin-woo and Jung Eun-woo. It aired on SBS on Mondays to Fridays at 19:20 for 125 episodes from June 8 to December 11, 2015.

== Synopsis ==
Hwang Geum-bok (Shin Da-eun) searches for her mother, Hwang Eun-sil (Jeon Mi-seon), who goes missing during a trip to Japan with her friend Baek Ri-hyang (Shim Hye-jin). Her search reveal the secrets behind her mother's mysterious disappearance.

== Cast ==
=== Main characters ===
- Shin Da-eun as Hwang Geum-bok
- Lee Elijah as Baek Ye-ryung
- Kim Jin-woo as Seo In-woo
- Jung Eun-woo as Kang Moon-hyuk
- Jeon Mi-seon as Hwang Eun-sil
  - Kim Hye-yoon as young Hwang Eun-sil (Ep. #7)

=== Supporting characters ===
- Shim Hye-jin as Baek Ri-hyang
- Kim Na-woon as Oh Mal-ja
- Jeon No-min as Kang Tae-joong
- Lee Hye-sook as Cha Mi-yeon
- Sunwoo Jae-duk as Kim Kyung-soo
- Kim Young-ok as Wang Yeo-sa

== Awards and nominations ==
Year	Award	Category	Recipient	Result
2015	23rd SBS Drama Awards	Top Excellence Award, Actress in a Serial Drama	Shim Hye-jin	Nominated
2015	23rd SBS Drama Awards	Excellence Award, Actress in a Serial Drama	Shin Da-eun	Nominated
2015	23rd SBS Drama Awards	Special Award, Actor in a Serial Drama	Jung Eun-woo	Nominated
2015	23rd SBS Drama Awards	Special Award, Actress in a Drama Short	Jeon Mi-seon	Won
2015	23rd SBS Drama Awards	New Star Award	Lee Elijah	Won
