= The King (2017 South Korean film) =

2017 South Korean film by Han Jae-rim

- Theatrical release poster
- Hangul: 더킹
- RR: Deoking
- MR: Tŏk'ing
- Directed by: Han Jae-rim
- Written by: Han Jae-rim
- Produced by: Han Jae-rim; Lee Jong-ho
- Starring: Zo In-sung; Jung Woo-sung; Bae Seong-woo; Ryu Jun-yeol; Kim Eui-sung; Kim Ah-joong
- Cinematography: Kim Woo-hyung
- Edited by: Shin Min-kyung
- Music by: Mowg
- Production companies: WooJoo Film; Magnum Nine
- Distributed by: Next Entertainment World
- Release date: January 18, 2017
- Running time: 134 minutes
- Country: South Korea
- Language: Korean
- Box office: US$37.9 million

The King (Korean: 더킹) is a 2017 South Korean crime drama film written and directed by Han Jae-rim, starring Zo In-sung, Jung Woo-sung, Bae Seong-woo, Ryu Jun-yeol, Kim Eui-sung, and Kim Ah-joong.

== Synopsis ==
Story about Park Tae-soo who's born in a poor family, decides to become a prosecutor after learning that power is the most important thing in life and, the biggest symbol of power in the 90's. After entering the most prestigious law school, experiencing democratic resistance in Korea, Tae-soo finally reaches his goal of becoming a prosecutor but his life is no better than a salary man. By chance, he joins a clique of the powerful prosecutors with wealth and authority. He finally gets a taste of a life of the top hierarchy, but as he enjoys the sweetness of supremacy, he also sees the cruel side of it.

== Cast ==
- Zo In-sung as Park Tae-soo
- Jung Woo-sung as Han Kang-shik
- Bae Seong-woo as Yang Dong-chul
- Ryu Jun-yeol as Choi Doo-il
- Kim Eui-sung as Kim Eung-soo
- Kim Ah-joong as Sang-hee
- Kim Min-jae as Baek Gi-ja
- Jung Sung-mo as Park Myung-hoon
- Jung Eun-chae as Park Shi-yeon
- Kim So-jin as Ahn Hee-yeon
- Hwang Seung-eon as Jun Hee-sung
- Oh Dae-hwan as Song Baek-ho
- Jung In-gi as Senior prosecutor
- Song Young-chang as Lee Hak-cheol
- Go Ah-sung as Kim Yang
- Park Jeong-min as Heo Gi-hoon
- Jo Woo-jin as Park Tae-soo's detective
- Jang Myung-gab as Um Hyun-gi
- Han Soo-yeon as Hostess
- Lee Joo-yeon as Cha Mi-ryeon
- Lee Yeol-eum as Eul-sun
- Shin Ryu-jin as Ji Min
- Park Ji-hong as Tae-soo's friend
- Choi Yeong-do as man involved in an accident
- Mi Seok as gang member 2
- Sung Dong-il as Tae-soo's teacher

== Production ==
First script reading took place in late January, 2016. Filming began on February 4 and finished July 3, 2016. Filming took place in Seoul, Daejeon and Busan in South Korea.

== Promotion and release ==
The film's first trailer has broken the record for most views for a Korean movie trailer with more than 7.17 million views in seven days within its release.

The film was released in South Korea on January 18, 2017. The film had a limited release in North America on January 27, 2017.

== Reception ==
The film was number-one on its opening in South Korea, with 1.85 million admissions and US$13.2 million in gross. In total, the film gathered 5.31 million spectators and grossed US$38.5 million nationwide, making it the 7th highest-grossing South Korean film in 2017.

== Awards and nominations ==
Award	Category	Recipient	Result
53rd Baeksang Arts Awards	Best Supporting Actor	Bae Sung-woo	Nominated
53rd Baeksang Arts Awards	Best Supporting Actress	Kim So-jin	Won
53rd Baeksang Arts Awards	Best New Actor	Ryu Jun-yeol	Won
26th Buil Film Awards	Best Supporting Actor	Ryu Jun-yeol	Nominated
26th Buil Film Awards	Best Supporting Actress	Kim So-jin	Nominated
26th Buil Film Awards	Best Cinematography	Kim Woo-hyung	Nominated
26th Buil Film Awards	Best Art Direction	The King	Nominated
54th Grand Bell Awards	Best Film	The King	Nominated
54th Grand Bell Awards	Best Director	Han Jae-rim	Nominated
54th Grand Bell Awards	Best Actor	Zo In-sung	Nominated
54th Grand Bell Awards	Best Supporting Actor	Bae Sung-woo	Won
54th Grand Bell Awards	Best Supporting Actress	Kim So-jin	Won
54th Grand Bell Awards	Technical Award	The King	Nominated
54th Grand Bell Awards	Best Planning	The King	Nominated
54th Grand Bell Awards	Best Art Direction	Lee Na-gyeom	Nominated
54th Grand Bell Awards	Best Screenplay	Han Jae-rim	Won
54th Grand Bell Awards	Best Music	Mowg	Nominated
54th Grand Bell Awards	Best Costume Design	Cho Sang-kyung	Nominated
54th Grand Bell Awards	Best Lighting	Kim Seung-gyoo	Nominated
54th Grand Bell Awards	Best Cinematography	Kim Woo-hyeong	Nominated
54th Grand Bell Awards	Best Editing	Sin Min-kyeong	Won
1st The Seoul Awards	Best Film	The King	Nominated
1st The Seoul Awards	Best Actor	Jung Woo-sung	Nominated
1st The Seoul Awards	Best Supporting Actor	Bae Sung-woo	Nominated
1st The Seoul Awards	Best New Actor	Ryu Jun-yeol	Won
38th Blue Dragon Film Awards	Best Film	The King	Nominated
38th Blue Dragon Film Awards	Best Actor	Zo In-sung	Nominated
38th Blue Dragon Film Awards	Popular Star Award	Zo In-sung	Won
38th Blue Dragon Film Awards	Best Supporting Actor	Bae Sung-woo	Nominated
38th Blue Dragon Film Awards	Best Supporting Actress	Kim So-jin	Won
38th Blue Dragon Film Awards	Best Cinematography and Lighting	Kim Woo-hyung & Kim Seung-gyu	Nominated
38th Blue Dragon Film Awards	Best Editing	Shin Min-kyung	Won
38th Blue Dragon Film Awards	Best Music	Mowg	Nominated
38th Blue Dragon Film Awards	Best Art Direction	Lee Na-gyeom	Nominated
17th Director's Cut Awards	Special Mentions	The King	Won
12th Asian Film Awards	Best Editing	Shin Min-kyung	Won
9th KOFRA Film Awards	Best Supporting Actress	Kim So-jin	Won
2nd Malaysia Golden Global Awards	Best Actor	Zo In-sung	Nominated
