= Reverse (2017 TV series) =

2017 South Korean television series

- Promotional poster
- Also known as: Backflow; Flow Back
- Hangul: 역류
- RR: Yeongnyu
- MR: Yŏngnyu
- Genre: Family; Melodrama; Revenge
- Created by: Choi Yong-won
- Written by: Kim Ji-yeon; Seo Shin-hye
- Directed by: Bae Han-cheol; Kim Mi-sook
- Starring: Shin Da-eun; Lee Jae-hwang; Kim Hae-in; Seo Do-young
- Country of origin: South Korea
- Original language: Korean
- No. of episodes: 119 (Note: Originally scheduled to air for 120 episodes, the series was reduced by one episode in lieu of two pre-empts.)

Production
- Running time: 35 minutes
- Production company: MBC C&I

Original release
- Network: MBC TV
- Release: November 13, 2017 – April 26, 2018

Reverse (Korean: 역류; RR: Yeongnyu) is a 2017 South Korean television series starring Shin Da-eun, Lee Jae-hwang, Kim Hae-in, and Seo Do-young. The series aired daily on MBC TV from 7:50 a.m. to 8:30 a.m. (KST) starting from November 13, 2017 and ending on April 26, 2018.

== Synopsis ==
Following the bankruptcy and sudden death of her father, as well as the disappearances of her boyfriend Joon-hee and younger brother Jae-min, interior designer Kim In-yeon faced significant challenges. She discovered that all these misfortunes were linked to Taeyang Group. From that day on, she resolved to take revenge on those responsible for her family's suffering.

== Cast ==
=== Main ===
- Shin Da-eun as Kim In-yeong

Soo Kyung's daughter. Jae-min's older sister. Designer.

- Lee Jae-hwang as Kang Dong-bin
- Kim Hae-in as Chae Yoo-ran
- Seo Do-young as Kang Joon-hee

=== Supporting ===
==== People around In-young ====
- Lee Eung-kyung as Yang Soo-kyung

In-young and Jae-min's mother.

- Ji Eun-sung as Kim Jae-min

In-young's younger brother. Soo-kyung's son

- So Hee-jung as Hong Cho-hee

==== People around Dong-bin ====
- Jung Sung-mo as Kang Baek-san
- Jung Ae-ri as Yeo Hyang-mi

==== People around Yoo-ran ====
- Nam Myung-ryul

==== Others ====
- Lee Hyun-gul
- Lim Do-yoon as Gong da-mi

In-young's alter ego

== International broadcast ==
In Vietnam, the series was broadcast on VTV3 at 18:10 p.m. on weekdays from February 28, 2020 under the title Ngược dòng.

== Ratings ==
- In this table, The blue numbers represent the lowest ratings and the red numbers represent the highest ratings.
- NR denotes that the drama did not rank in the top 20 daily programs on that date.
- N/A denotes that the rating is not known.

Ep.	Broadcast date	Average audience share			
Ep.	Broadcast date	TNmS		AGB Nielsen	
Ep.	Broadcast date	Nationwide	Seoul	Nationwide	Seoul
1	November 13, 2017	7.2% (18th)	—N/a	5.7% (NR)	—N/a
2	November 14, 2017	7.8% (16th)	6.5% (16th)	6.5% (19th)	—N/a
3	November 15, 2017	7.5% (14th)	6.3% (16th)	6.2% (17th)	—N/a
4	November 16, 2017	6.4% (NR)	—N/a	6.3% (NR)	—N/a
5	November 17, 2017	7.0% (15th)	—N/a	5.9% (19th)	—N/a
6	November 20, 2017	6.5% (17th)	5.5% (18th)	6.4% (NR)	—N/a
7	November 21, 2017	7.5% (12th)	6.8% (17th)	6.7% (19th)	6.2% (20th)
8	November 22, 2017	7.6% (14th)	6.8% (19th)	6.2% (NR)	—N/a
9	November 23, 2017	7.2% (17th)	6.4% (20th)	6.0% (NR)	—N/a
10	November 24, 2017	7.9% (14th)	6.8% (17th)	6.5% (17th)	6.3% (19th)
11	November 27, 2017	7.5% (17th)	6.3% (19th)	6.1% (NR)	—N/a
12	November 28, 2017	7.5% (14th)	6.0% (17th)	5.7% (19th)	—N/a
13	November 29, 2017	7.2% (15th)	6.2% (18th)	6.9% (16th)	6.8% (16th)
14	November 30, 2017	7.5% (15th)	—N/a	6.7% (18th)	6.4% (20th)
15	December 1, 2017	7.8% (14th)	6.8% (14th)	6.6% (16th)	6.4% (16th)
16	December 4, 2017	6.8% (NR)	—N/a	6.2% (NR)	—N/a
17	December 5, 2017	6.8% (15th)	—N/a	6.7% (16th)	—N/a
18	December 6, 2017	8.1% (14th)	7.0% (15th)	6.2% 19th)	—N/a
19	December 7, 2017	8.1% (14th)	7.3% (16th)	6.3% (NR)	—N/a
20	December 8, 2017	7.8% (17th)	5.9% (19th)	6.3% (18th)	—N/a
21	December 11, 2017	7.2% (NR)	—N/a	6.5% (NR)	—N/a
22	December 12, 2017	6.9% (15th)	—N/a	5.6% (NR)	—N/a
23	December 13, 2017	8.0% (15th)	6.7% (19th)	6.6% (20th)	—N/a
24	December 14, 2017	7.9% (15th)	6.4% (19th)	6.1% (NR)	—N/a
25	December 15, 2017	7.2% (19th)	5.9% (18th)	6.3% (20th)	—N/a
26	December 18, 2017	7.4% (20th)	—N/a	6.0% (NR)	—N/a
27	December 19, 2017	7.3% (15th)	—N/a	6.3% (NR)	—N/a
28	December 20, 2017	8.0% (14th)	6.4% (19th)	6.5% (19th)	—N/a
29	December 21, 2017	8.5% (10th)	6.6% (12th)	6.6% (17th)	—N/a
30	December 22, 2017	6.9% (18th)	5.5% (19th)	6.3% (19th)	—N/a
31	December 25, 2017	5.9% (NR)	—N/a	4.9% (NR)	—N/a
32	December 26, 2017	9.3% (10th)	—N/a	7.0% (15th)	6.2% (19th)
33	December 27, 2017	8.7% (13th)	6.9% (16th)	6.5% (20th)	—N/a
34	December 28, 2017	8.6% (11th)	6.4% (16th)	7.0% (18th)	6.7% (19th)
35	December 29, 2017	8.3% (15th)	6.5% (19th)	6.9% (17th)	6.2% (20th)
36	January 1, 2018	4.5% (NR)	—N/a	5.2% (NR)	—N/a
37	January 2, 2018	7.9% (18th)	—N/a	6.2% (20th)	—N/a
38	January 3, 2018	8.2% (12th)	5.8% (19th)	6.9% (18th)	6.2% (20th)
39	January 4, 2018	8.9% (13th)	—N/a	7.4% (15th)	7.2% (17th)
40	January 5, 2018	8.5% (15th)	—N/a	6.5% (16th)	—N/a
41	January 8, 2018	7.9% (17th)	—N/a	6.7% (NR)	—N/a
42	January 9, 2018	8.2% (12th)	—N/a	6.8% (20th)	—N/a
43	January 10, 2018	8.6% (10th)	—N/a	7.2% (15th)	6.8% (12th)
44	January 11, 2018	8.9% (12th)	—N/a	7.6% (15th)	7.2% (18th)
45	January 12, 2018	8.6% (16th)	—N/a	6.9% (18th)	6.7% (18th)
46	January 15, 2018	8.4% (14th)	—N/a	6.8% (20th)	—N/a
47	January 16, 2018	8.5% (12th)	—N/a	7.1% (18th)	—N/a
48	January 17, 2018	8.6% (9th)	—N/a	7.4% (12th)	6.5% (17th)
49	January 18, 2018	9.2% (9th)	—N/a	7.3% (17th)	6.5% (19th)
50	January 19, 2018	9.4% (13th)	—N/a	7.3% (16th)	6.7% (17th)
51	January 22, 2018	8.5% (14th)	—N/a	6.6% (NR)	—N/a
52	January 23, 2018	9.5% (9th)	—N/a	7.4% (18th)	6.5% (19th)
53	January 24, 2018	9.3% (13th)	—N/a	7.2% (17th)	6.8% (18th)
54	January 25, 2018	9.8% (11th)	—N/a	7.3% (18th)	6.7% (18th)
55	January 26, 2018	9.1% (16th)	—N/a	7.5% (17th)	6.5% (19th)
56	January 29, 2018	9.1% (13th)	—N/a	7.5% (16th)	6.7% (19th)
57	January 30, 2018	8.7% (8th)	—N/a	7.4% (13th)	6.7% (18th)
58	January 31, 2018	8.7% (14th)	—N/a	7.3% (14th)	6.4% (17th)
59	February 1, 2018	9.3% (14th)	—N/a	7.5% (15th)	7.0% (14th)
60	February 2, 2018	9.7% (13th)	—N/a	7.4% (17th)	6.8% (16th)
61	February 5, 2018	9.7% (12th)	—N/a	7.3% (14th)	6.5% (18th)
62	February 6, 2018	10.2% (9th)	—N/a	7.8% (11th)	6.8% (15th)
63	February 7, 2018	9.7% (12th)	—N/a	7.7% (15th)	6.9% (17th)
64	February 8, 2018	10.4% (8th)	—N/a	7.6% (11th)	6.9% (11th)
65	February 9, 2018	9.9% (9th)	—N/a	7.3% (14th)	6.7% (14th)
66	February 12, 2018	9.1% (15th)	—N/a	7.7% (16th)	7.3% (15th)
67	February 13, 2018	9.0% (12th)	—N/a	7.1% (15th)	6.5% (16th)
68	February 14, 2018	9.2% (10th)	—N/a	7.4% (17th)	—N/a
69	February 15, 2018	7.5% (11th)	—N/a	5.5% (NR)	—N/a
70	February 16, 2018	4.9% (NR)	—N/a	3.5% (NR)	—N/a
71	February 19, 2018	9.6% (11th)	—N/a	6.8% (NR)	—N/a
72	February 20, 2018	10.8% (8th)	—N/a	6.9% (18th)	6.1% (19th)
73	February 21, 2018	9.8% (9th)	—N/a	7.8% (11th)	7.0% (11th)
74	February 22, 2018	10.8% (10th)	—N/a	7.6% (12th)	6.8% (13th)
75	February 23, 2018	9.2% (9th)	—N/a	8.3% (9th)	7.5% (10th)
76	February 26, 2018	10.3% (9th)	—N/a	7.4% (19th)	6.7% (20th)
77	February 27, 2018	7.9% (12th)	—N/a	7.9% (12th)	7.4% (16th)
78	February 28, 2018	10.4% (10th)	—N/a	7.5% (15th)	6.7% (18th)
79	March 1, 2018	9.8 (11th)	—N/a	7.0% (18th)	—N/a
80	March 2, 2018	10.5% (11th)	—N/a	7.6% (17th)	7.0% (17th)
81	March 5, 2018	10.2% (10th)	—N/a	7.5% (20th)	7.0% (19th)
82	March 6, 2018	11.1% (7th)	—N/a	8.2% (10th)	7.5% (12th)
83	March 7, 2018	10.5% (10th)	—N/a	7.0% (15th)	6.5% (14th)
84	March 8, 2018	10.6% (11th)	—N/a	7.8% (14th)	7.2% (13th)
85	March 9, 2018	10.7% (7th)	—N/a	7.7% (15th)	7.3% (15th)
86	March 12, 2018	10.8% (7th)	—N/a	7.6% (16th)	6.9% (17th)
87	March 13, 2018	11.3% (6th)	—N/a	7.7% (13th)	7.1% (13th)
88	March 15, 2018 (Note: No episode was aired on March 14 due to a special news broadcast. In return, two episodes were shown back-to-back on April 23.)	10.9% (10th)	—N/a	7.9% (15th)	7.0% (15th)
89	March 16, 2018	11.5% (7th)	—N/a	7.6% (16th)	6.8% (18th)
90	March 19, 2018	10.9% (7th)	—N/a	7.9% (15th)	7.0% (18th)
91	March 20, 2018	11.7% (6th)	—N/a	8.0% (12th)	6.6% (17th)
92	March 21, 2018	11.0% (9th)	—N/a	8.3% (13th)	7.3% (13th)
93	March 22, 2018	11.9% (9th)	—N/a	8.4% (13th)	7.4% (10th)
94	March 23, 2018	11.9% (7th)	—N/a	8.4% (12th)	7.9% (11th)
95	March 26, 2018	11.3% (8th)	—N/a	8.2% (12th)	7.3% (15th)
96	March 27, 2018	11.8% (6th)	—N/a	8.2% (10th)	7.4% (11th)
97	March 28, 2018	11.2% (6th)	—N/a	8.7% (7th)	8.0% (8th)
98	March 29, 2018	12.0% (7th)	—N/a	8.5% (8th)	7.9% (10th)
99	March 30, 2018	12.1% (7th)	—N/a	8.1% (12th)	7.5% (12th)
100	April 2, 2018	10.7% (8th)	—N/a	8.8% (11th)	8.4% (12th)
101	April 3, 2018	11.0% (6th)	—N/a	8.3% (9th)	7.5% (12th)
102	April 4, 2018	10.5% (7th)	—N/a	8.8% (7th)	8.0% (9th)
103	April 5, 2018	11.7% (5th)	—N/a	7.9% (11th)	7.5% (13th)
104	April 6, 2018	10.7% (8th)	—N/a	8.2% (12th)	7.0% (12th)
105	April 9, 2018	10.5% (8th)	—N/a	9.2% (11th)	11.6% (4th)
106	April 10, 2018	10.4% (7th)	—N/a	8.7% (9th)	8.2% (10th)
107	April 11, 2018	11.4% (7th)	—N/a	8.8% (7th)	7.9% (8th)
108	April 12, 2018	11.3% (7th)	—N/a	8.8% (8th)	7.9% (8th)
109	April 13, 2018	10.2% (9th)	—N/a	8.2% (12th)	7.4% (13th)
110	April 16, 2018	10.8% (5th)	—N/a	8.1% (9th)	7.4% (13th)
111	April 17, 2018	11.3% (6th)	—N/a	8.2% (9th)	7.5% (10th)
112	April 18, 2018	10.8% (7th)	—N/a	8.5% (7th)	7.6% (8th)
113	April 19, 2018	10.9% (6th)	—N/a	9.1% (7th)	8.4% (8th)
114	April 20, 2018	12.0% (6th)	—N/a	9.3% (10th)	8.5% (12th)
115	April 23, 2018	12.1% (6th)	—N/a	8.8% (10th)	7.6% (19th)
116	April 23, 2018	5.3% (NR)	—N/a	3.7% (NR)	(NR)
117	April 24, 2018	12.1% (6th)	—N/a	8.7% (10th)	7.4% (12th)
118	April 25, 2018	11.2% (6th)	—N/a	9.3% (7th)	8.6% (7th)
119	April 26, 2018 (Note: No episodes would be aired on April 27 due to a special news broadcast. This episode was the finale of the series.)	11.0% (6th)	—N/a	9.4% (7th)	8.8% (7th)
Average		9.3%	-	7.2%	-

== Awards and nominations ==
Year	Award	Category	Nominee	Result
2017	36th MBC Drama Awards	Excellence Award, Actress in a Soap Opera	Shin Da-eun	Nominated
