= Yoo Ha =

South Korean filmmaker (born 1963)

- Born: Kim Young-joon; February 9, 1963 (age 63); Gochang, South Korea
- Other name: Yu Ha
- Education: Dongguk University - BA; Sejong University - MA
- Occupations: Film director, Screenwriter, Poet, Professor
- Years active: 1988 - present

Korean name
- Hangul: 김영준
- Hanja: 金榮俊
- RR: Gim Yeongjun
- MR: Kim Yŏngjun

Pen name
- Hangul: 유하
- RR: Yu Ha
- MR: Yu Ha

Yoo Ha (Korean: 유하; or spelled Yu Ha; born 9 February 1963) is a South Korean film director, screenwriter and a contemporary poet. He directed the films Marriage Is a Crazy Thing (2002), Once Upon a Time in High School (2004), A Dirty Carnival (2006). The latter is a gangster movie with allusions to Martin Scorsese films like Gangs of New York, Mean Streets and Goodfellas.

== Filmography ==
- A Day of Poet Goobo (short; 1990)
- We Must Go to Apgujeong-dong on Windy Days (1993)
- Marriage Is a Crazy Thing (2002)
- Once Upon a Time in High School (2004)
- A Dirty Carnival (2006)
- A Frozen Flower (2008)
- Howling (2012)
- Gangnam Blues (2015)
- Pipeline (2021)

== Bibliography ==
=== Poetry collection ===
- It's Sunshining Mind to Him Who Is Leaving (Korean: 떠나는 그대 눈부신 명상입니다; 1990). Tree of Books. OCLC 30512330.
- We Must Go to Apgujeong-dong on Windy Days (Korean: 바람 부는 날이면 압구정동에 가야 한다; 1991). Literature & Wisdom. OCLC 28851004.
- There Are No Ugly Brides (Korean: 안 이쁜 신부도 있나 뭐; 1991). Segye-sa. ISBN 978-89-338-1017-0.
- Moorim Diary (Korean: 무림 일기; 1994). JoongAng M&B. OCLC 814879354.
- Love of the Sewoon Shopping Mall's Kid (Korean: 세운 상가 키드의 사랑; 1995). Literature & Wisdom. ISBN 978-89-320-0770-0.
- Contributing to the Bruce Lee's Generation (Korean: 이소룡 세대에 바친다; 1995). Town of Literature. ISBN 978-89-85712-74-3.
- My Love Was Lightweight Like a Butterfly (Korean: 나의 사랑은 나비처럼 가벼웠다; 1999). Yeolimwon. ISBN 978-89-7063-184-4.
- The Thousand Days' Story About Horses (Korean: 천일 마화; 2000). Literature & Wisdom. ISBN 978-89-320-1207-0.
- Whole Dinner of the World (Korean: 세상의 모든 저녁; 2007). Mineum-sa. ISBN 978-89-374-0556-3.

=== Essay ===
- How to Appreciate Jazz Music Interestingly (Korean: 재즈를 재미있게 듣는 법; 1999). The Golden Branch. ISBN 978-89-8273-095-5.

== Awards ==
- Kim Suyeong Literary Award (1996)

== See also ==
- Lee Chang-dong
- Hong Sang-soo
