= 2013 SBS Drama Awards =

21st edition of award ceremony

- Date: December 31, 2013
- Site: SBS Prism Tower in Sangam-dong, Seoul
- Hosted by: Lee Hwi-jae; Lee Bo-young; Kim Woo-bin
- Produced by: Kim Yong-jae

Television coverage
- Network: SBS

The 2013 SBS Drama Awards is a ceremony honoring the best performances in television on the SBS network for the year 2013. It was held at the SBS Prism Tower in Sangam-dong, Seoul on December 31, 2013, and hosted by Lee Hwi-jae, Lee Bo-young, and Kim Woo-bin.

== Nominations and winners ==
Complete list of nominees and winners:

(Winners denoted in bold)

Grand Prize (Daesang)	SBS Special Award
**Lee Bo-young** - **I Can Hear Your Voice as Jang Hye-sung**	**Jo In-sung** - **That Winter, the Wind Blows as Oh Soo**
Top Excellence Award, Actor in a Miniseries	Top Excellence Award, Actress in a Miniseries
**So Ji-sub** - **Master's Sun as Joo Joong-won**; Jo In-sung - That Winter, the Wind Blows as Oh Soo; Shin Ha-kyun - All About My Romance as Kim Soo-young; Yoo Jun-sang - The Secret of Birth as Hong Gyung-doo	**Song Hye-kyo** - **That Winter, the Wind Blows as Oh Young**; Gong Hyo-jin - Master's Sun as Tae Gong-shil; Lee Bo-young - I Can Hear Your Voice as Jang Hye-sung; Moon Geun-young - Cheongdam-dong Alice as Han Se-kyung
Top Excellence Award, Actor in a Mid-length Drama	Top Excellence Award, Actress in a Mid-length Drama
**Lee Min-ho** - **The Heirs as Kim Tan**; Go Soo - Empire of Gold as Jang Tae-joo; Kang Ji-hwan - Incarnation of Money as Lee Cha-don/Lee Kang-seok; Kwon Sang-woo - King of Ambition as Ha Ryu/Cha Jae-woong	**Lee Yo-won** - **Empire of Gold as Choi Seo-yoon**; Choi Ji-woo - The Suspicious Housekeeper as Park Bok-nyeo; Hwang Jung-eum - Incarnation of Money as Bok Jae-in; Soo Ae - King of Ambition as Joo Da-hae
Top Excellence Award, Actor in a Serial Drama	Top Excellence Award, Actress in a Serial Drama
**Jun Kwang-ryul** - **Passionate Love as Kang Moon-do**; Jung Gyu-woon - Wonderful Mama as Jang Hoon-nam; Park Yong-woo - My Lover, Madame Butterfly as Lee Woo-jae	**Nam Sang-mi** - **Goddess of Marriage as Song Ji-hye**; Hwang Shin-hye - Passionate Love as Hong Nan-cho; Park Eun-hye - Two Women's Room as Min Kyung-chae; Yum Jung-ah - My Lover, Madame Butterfly as Nam Na-bi
Excellence Award, Actor in a Miniseries	Excellence Award, Actress in a Miniseries
**Lee Jong-suk** - **I Can Hear Your Voice as Park Soo-ha**; Kim Bum - That Winter, the Wind Blows as Park Jin-sung; Kim Ji-seok - Cheongdam-dong Alice as Tommy Hong; Yoon Sang-hyun - I Can Hear Your Voice as Cha Gwan-woo	**Sung Yu-ri** - **The Secret of Birth as Jung Yi-hyun**; Han Chae-ah - All About My Romance as Ahn Hee-sun; Lee Da-hee - I Can Hear Your Voice as Seo Do-yeon; So Yi-hyun - Cheongdam-dong Alice as Seo Yoon-joo
Excellence Award, Actor in a Mid-length Drama	Excellence Award, Actress in a Mid-length Drama
**Sung Dong-il** - **Jang Ok-jung, Living by Love as Jang Hyun**; Lee Sung-jae - The Suspicious Housekeeper as Eun Sang-chul; Park Sang-min - Incarnation of Money as Ji Se-kwang; Yoo Ah-in - Jang Ok-jung, Living by Love as King Sukjong	**Park Shin-hye** - **The Heirs as Cha Eun-sang**; Kim Tae-hee - Jang Ok-jung, Living by Love as Jang Ok-jung; Wang Ji-hye - The Suspicious Housekeeper as Yoon Song-hwa
Excellence Award, Actor in a Serial Drama	Excellence Award, Actress in a Serial Drama
**Kim Ji-hoon** - **Goddess of Marriage as Kang Tae-wook**; Kang Ji-sub - Two Women's Room as Han Ji-sub; Lee Sang-woo - Goddess of Marriage as Kim Hyun-woo; Park Yoon-jae - Your Lady as Kang Jung-hoon	**Wang Bit-na** - **Two Women's Room as Eun Hee-soo**; Jeong Yu-mi - Wonderful Mama as Go Young-chae; Kang So-ra - Ugly Alert as Na Do-hee; Lee So-yeon - The Birth of a Family as Lee Soo-jung
Special Acting Award, Actor in a Drama Short	Special Acting Award, Actress in a Drama Short
**Jung Eun-woo** - **Stranger as Lee Young-ho**	**Kim Mi-sook** - **Case No. 113 as Kang Hee-kyung**
Special Acting Award, Actor in a Miniseries	Special Acting Award, Actress in a Miniseries
**Jung Woong-in** - **I Can Hear Your Voice as Min Joon-gook**; Choi Jung-woo - Master's Sun as Kim Gwi-do; Kim Kwang-kyu - I Can Hear Your Voice as Kim Gong-sook; Kim Tae-woo - That Winter, the Wind Blows as Jo Moo-chul	**Kim Mi-kyung** - **Master's Sun as Joo Sung-ran**; Bae Jong-ok - That Winter, the Wind Blows as Wang Hye-ji; Kim Hae-sook - I Can Hear Your Voice as Eo Choon-shim; Kim Jung-nan - All About My Romance as Go Dong-sook
Special Acting Award, Actor in a Mid-length Drama	Special Acting Award, Actress in a Mid-length Drama
**Lee Hyo-jung** - **Jang Ok-jung, Living by Love as Min Yoo-joong**; Jung Han-yong - Empire of Gold as Choi Dong-jin; Lee Deok-hwa - King of Ambition as Baek Chang-hak; Park Geun-hyung - Empire of Gold as Choi Dong-seong	**Kim Sung-ryung** - **The Heirs as Han Ki-ae**; Jang Shin-young - Empire of Gold as Yoon Seol-hee; Kim Mi-sook - Empire of Gold as Han Jeong-hee; Oh Yoon-ah - Incarnation of Money as Eun Bi-ryung
Special Acting Award, Actor in a Serial Drama	Special Acting Award, Actress in a Serial Drama
**Jang Hyun-sung** - **Goddess of Marriage as Noh Seung-soo**; Ahn Nae-sang - Wonderful Mama as Jang Ki-nam; Chun Ho-jin - Ugly Alert as Na Il-pyung; Lee Soon-jae - Ugly Alert as Na Sang-jin	**Jang Young-nam** - **Goddess of Marriage as Kwon Eun-hee**; Kim Chung - Two Women's Room as Gong Bok-ja; Kim Young-ae - My Lover, Madame Butterfly as Lee Jung-ae; Yoon So-jung - Goddess of Marriage as Lee Jung-sook
Producer's Award	Achievement Award
**Lee Bo-young** - **I Can Hear Your Voice as Jang Hye-sung**	**Kim Soo-mi** - **Incarnation of Money**
Netizen Popularity Award	Best Couple Award
**Lee Min-ho** - **The Heirs**; Jo In-sung - That Winter, the Wind Blows; Kim Woo-bin - The Heirs; Lee Bo-young - I Can Hear Your Voice; Lee Jong-suk - I Can Hear Your Voice; Lee Yo-won - Empire of Gold; Nam Sang-mi - Goddess of Marriage; Park Shin-hye - The Heirs; So Ji-sub - Master's Sun; Song Hye-kyo - That Winter, the Wind Blows	**Lee Min-ho** and **Park Shin-hye** - **The Heirs**; Go Soo and Jang Shin-young - Empire of Gold; Im Joo-hwan and Kang So-ra - Ugly Alert; Jo In-sung and Song Hye-kyo - That Winter, the Wind Blows; Kang Ji-hwan and Hwang Jung-eum - Incarnation of Money; Kwon Sang-woo and Soo Ae - King of Ambition; Lee Jong-suk and Lee Bo-young - I Can Hear Your Voice; Seo In-guk and Kim Yoo-ri - Master's Sun; So Ji-sub and Gong Hyo-jin - Master's Sun; Yoo Ah-in and Kim Tae-hee - Jang Ok-jung, Living by Love

=== Top 10 Stars ===
- Jo In-sung - That Winter, the Wind Blows
- Kim Woo-bin - The Heirs
- Lee Bo-young - I Can Hear Your Voice
- Lee Jong-suk - I Can Hear Your Voice
- Lee Min-ho - The Heirs
- Lee Yo-won - Empire of Gold
- Nam Sang-mi - Goddess of Marriage
- Park Shin-hye - The Heirs
- So Ji-sub - Master's Sun
- Song Hye-kyo - That Winter, the Wind Blows

=== New Star Award ===
- Choi Jin-hyuk - The Heirs
- Im Joo-hwan - Ugly Alert
- Jung Eun-ji - That Winter, the Wind Blows
- Kang Min-hyuk - The Heirs
- Kang So-ra - Ugly Alert
- Kim Ji-won - The Heirs
- Kim So-hyun - The Suspicious Housekeeper
- Kim Yoo-ri - Cheongdam-dong Alice, Master's Sun
- Lee Da-hee - I Can Hear Your Voice
- Seo In-guk - Master's Sun
