= Ugly Alert =

2013 South Korean daily drama

- Promotional poster
- Also known as: Ugly Warning; Fool Watch; Watch Out for Fools; My Ugly Brother
- Genre: Romance; Family; Melodrama
- Written by: Jung Ji-woo
- Directed by: Shin Yoon-sub
- Starring: Im Joo-hwan; Kim Seol-hyun; Choi Tae-joon; Kang Byul; Kang So-ra
- Country of origin: South Korea
- Original language: Korean
- No. of episodes: 133

Production
- Producer: Hong Sung-chang
- Production location: South Korea
- Running time: Mondays to Fridays at 19:20 (KST)
- Production companies: Shinyoung E&C Group; Human Nature

Original release
- Network: Seoul Broadcasting System
- Release: 20 May – 13 December 2013

Ugly Alert (Korean: 못난이 주의보; Hanja: 못난이 注意報; RR: Monnani juuibo) is a 2013 South Korean daily drama starring Im Joo-hwan, Kang So-ra, Choi Tae-joon, and Kang Byul. It aired on SBS from May 20 to December 13, 2013 on Mondays to Fridays at 19:20 for 133 episodes.

== Plot ==
Gong Joon-soo is a man who's had a rough life and early on had to fend for himself. He takes the blame for a murder his younger sibling commits and serves time in prison. There he learns to sew and acquires a trade. With his newly acquired skills, Joon-soo goes to work for Na Do-hee at a fashion company. Do-hee has inherited her job because her grandfather built the company. But even though she inherited her position, she is serious about doing a good job and is something of a workaholic.

== Cast ==
Gong family

- Im Joo-hwan as Gong Joon-soo
  - Kang Yi-seok as young Joon-soo
- Kang Byul as Gong Jin-joo
  - Jung Da-bin as young Jin-joo
- Choi Tae-joon as Gong Hyeon-seok
  - Nam Da-reum as young Hyeon-seok
- Kim Seol-hyun as Gong Na-ri
  - Kim Ha-yoo as young Na-ri
- Ahn Nae-sang as Gong Sang-man
- Shin Ae-ra as Jin Sun-hye

Na family

- Kang So-ra as Na Do-hee
- Shin So-yul as Shin Joo-young
- Lee Soon-jae as Na Sang-jin
- Chun Ho-jin as Na Il-pyung
- Yoon Son-ha as Yoo Jung-hee
- Lee Il-hwa as Na In-sook
- Kim Il-woo as Shin Tae-il

Extended cast

- Kim Young-hoon as Lee Han-seo
- Hyun Woo as Kang Chul-soo
- Song Ok-sook as Bang Jung-ja
- Kim Ha-kyun as Choo Man-dol
- Kim Dae-hee as Cha Dae-ki
- Maya as Kim In-joo
- Kim Da-rae as Miss Choi
- Jo Hyun-jin as Miss Lee
- Cho Yoon-woo as Lee Dong-woo
- Ahn Sang-tae as Webtoon writer Park Moo-peul
- Kim In-ho as Student part-timer
- Jang Ga-hyun as Team leader
- Ban Hyo-jung as Chairwoman Ban Hyo-jung
- Park Jae-rom
- Moon Chun-shik
- Ryu Sung-hoon

Cameos

- Oh Seung-yoon as Lee Kyung-tae
- Ahn Suk-hwan as Kyung-tae's father
- Kim Seung-wook as Detective Kim
- Nam Kyung-eup as Han-seo's father
- Wang Bit-na as Joon-soo and Jin-joo's homeroom teacher (ep 1)
- Maeng Bong-hak as Yoo Jung-yeon's father (ep 6)
- Lee Hee-kyung as 25 Entertainment employee (ep 7)
- Kim Min-kyung as Client

== Ratings ==
In the tables below, the blue numbers represent the lowest ratings and the red numbers represent the highest ratings.

Episode #	Original broadcast date	Average audience share			
Episode #	Original broadcast date	TNmS Ratings		AGB Nielsen	
Episode #	Original broadcast date	Nationwide	Seoul National Capital Area	Nationwide	Seoul National Capital Area
1	20 May 2013	7.0%	7.7%	7.0%	7.3%
2	21 May 2013	6.5%	7.2%	5.6%	5.7%
3	22 May 2013	6.6%	7.4%	6.5%	7.4%
4	23 May 2013	6.8%	7.0%	5.6%	5.9%
5	24 May 2013	7.5%	8.1%	7.3%	7.8%
6	27 May 2013	9.0%	9.5%	8.7%	8.9%
7	28 May 2013	8.4%	9.2%	8.5%	8.8%
8	29 May 2013	7.8%	8.6%	7.9%	8.7%
9	30 May 2013	7.1%	7.7%	7.3%	7.5%
10	31 May 2013	8.1%	9.1%	8.3%	9.3%
11	3 June 2013	7.4%	7.5%	7.7%	8.2%
12	4 June 2013	6.9%	7.4%	8.3%	9.2%
13	5 June 2013	7.8%	8.5%	8.4%	9.4%
14	6 June 2013	7.2%	8.3%	8.9%	9.9%
15	7 June 2013	7.7%	8.8%	8.8%	9.1%
16	10 June 2013	8.6%	9.3%	9.4%	10.3%
17	11 June 2013	8.8%	9.2%	10.0%	11.2%
18	12 June 2013	8.7%	8.7%	9.6%	11.1%
19	13 June 2013	8.4%	8.6%	9.4%	10.6%
20	14 June 2013	8.3%	8.7%	9.4%	10.4%
21	17 June 2013	9.1%	10.5%	9.7%	10.7%
22	18 June 2013	10.9%	11.0%	10.6%	11.8%
23	19 June 2013	8.9%	10.4%	8.5%	9.6%
24	20 June 2013	8.8%	9.8%	10.0%	11.2%
25	21 June 2013	8.9%	10.0%	9.5%	10.8%
26	24 June 2013	8.3%	8.9%	8.9%	10.1%
27	25 June 2013	8.8%	9.4%	9.6%	10.7%
28	26 June 2013	8.1%	9.1%	7.6%	8.2%
29	28 June 2013	9.0%	10.8%	9.4%	10.7%
30	1 July 2013	8.5%	8.4%	8.7%	9.8%
31	2 July 2013	9.7%	11.4%	9.5%	10.4%
32	3 July 2013	8.6%	9.5%	8.4%	9.0%
33	4 July 2013	10.1%	11.5%	10.0%	11.2%
34	5 July 2013	9.4%	9.9%	8.8%	9.1%
35	8 July 2013	9.0%	11.1%	9.9%	11.3%
36	9 July 2013	8.9%	10.6%	8.7%	9.7%
37	10 July 2013	8.6%	9.5%	8.2%	9.4%
38	11 July 2013	9.3%	11.6%	8.8%	9.9%
39	12 July 2013	9.1%	10.2%	8.7%	9.8%
40	15 July 2013	9.2%	10.3%	9.7%	10.8%
41	16 July 2013	9.3%	10.8%	10.3%	11.6%
42	17 July 2013	8.7%	10.2%	8.7%	9.8%
43	18 July 2013	8.8%	9.7%	9.0%	10.0%
44	19 July 2013	8.4%	9.4%	8.4%	9.3%
45	22 July 2013	9.6%	10.9%	10.7%	12.0%
46	23 July 2013	9.5%	11.0%	9.8%	10.7%
47	24 July 2013	7.9%	8.8%	8.8%	9.6%
48	25 July 2013	8.3%	9.2%	8.9%	9.7%
49	26 July 2013	8.7%	10.4%	8.8%	9.4%
50	29 July 2013	9.2%	10.1%	9.1%	9.7%
51	30 July 2013	9.7%	10.4%	10.5%	11.3%
52	31 July 2013	8.7%	10.5%	8.3%	8.5%
53	1 August 2013	8.9%	9.8%	9.1%	9.0%
54	2 August 2013	8.3%	9.9%	9.0%	9.3%
55	5 August 2013	9.3%	10.5%	9.2%	9.7%
56	6 August 2013	9.9%	11.2%	9.9%	10.7%
57	7 August 2013	9.1%	9.2%	8.8%	9.4%
58	8 August 2013	9.2%	10.2%	9.0%	9.4%
59	9 August 2013	9.7%	10.6%	10.6%	11.8%
60	12 August 2013	8.6%	9.5%	9.8%	11.1%
61	13 August 2013	8.8%	10.0%	9.5%	10.2%
62	14 August 2013	8.6%	8.6%	8.3%	8.8%
63	15 August 2013	8.1%	8.3%	9.2%	9.6%
64	16 August 2013	8.9%	9.5%	9.0%	8.9%
65	19 August 2013	8.9%	9.5%	10.9%	11.7%
66	20 August 2013	8.8%	9.4%	9.5%	9.9%
67	21 August 2013	8.1%	9.1%	9.9%	11.2%
68	22 August 2013	10.0%	10.5%	10.6%	11.5%
69	23 August 2013	8.7%	8.5%	9.8%	9.5%
70	26 August 2013	8.3%	8.8%	10.5%	11.1%
71	27 August 2013	9.7%	10.2%	9.6%	10.1%
72	28 August 2013	8.1%	8.3%	9.8%	11.1%
73	29 August 2013	9.2%	10.0%	10.9%	11.1%
74	30 August 2013	8.1%	8.6%	9.7%	10.5%
75	2 September 2013	8.4%	8.9%	10.3%	11.0%
76	3 September 2013	8.5%	9.0%	8.6%	8.9%
77	4 September 2013	8.9%	9.9%	9.9%	10.7%
78	5 September 2013	8.9%	9.8%	9.8%	10.7%
79	9 September 2013	8.6%	9.2%	10.5%	11.2%
80	10 September 2013	9.5%	10.3%	10.1%	10.7%
81	11 September 2013	8.7%	9.8%	9.3%	10.3%
82	12 September 2013	9.4%	10.3%	9.4%	10.0%
83	13 September 2013	7.8%	8.5%	9.3%	9.7%
84	16 September 2013	8.5%	9.3%	9.1%	9.6%
85	17 September 2013	9.0%	10.2%	8.7%	9.2%
86	18 September 2013	7.7%	8.3%	7.7%	8.0%
87	20 September 2013	8.7%	9.0%	9.1%	9.5%
88	23 September 2013	9.3%	9.9%	10.8%	11.3%
89	24 September 2013	9.3%	10.6%	10.2%	10.9%
90	25 September 2013	9.3%	10.4%	10.2%	10.8%
91	26 September 2013	8.8%	9.5%	10.4%	11.1%
92	30 September 2013	9.8%	11.0%	10.4%	11.0%
93	1 October 2013	10.0%	11.1%	10.2%	11.0%
94	2 October 2013	9.3%	10.5%	9.2%	10.3%
95	3 October 2013	10.5%	12.1%	9.6%	9.7%
96	4 October 2013	9.9%	11.3%	10.0%	10.3%
97	7 October 2013	10.7%	10.7%	10.4%	10.7%
98	8 October 2013	10.9%	12.5%	10.5%	10.3%
99	9 October 2013	10.0%	11.5%	10.2%	10.9%
100	10 October 2013	9.7%	11.0%	10.5%	11.0%
101	11 October 2013	9.0%	9.1%	10.5%	10.9%
102	14 October 2013	12.1%	12.9%	12.4%	12.2%
103	16 October 2013	11.2%	12.8%	11.3%	11.6%
104	17 October 2013	10.1%	10.9%	9.6%	9.7%
105	18 October 2013	11.8%	12.7%	11.2%	10.9%
106	21 October 2013	9.6%	10.8%	10.3%	10.7%
107	22 October 2013	9.5%	10.5%	8.8%	8.4%
108	23 October 2013	9.1%	11.0%	8.9%	9.2%
109	24 October 2013	9.7%	9.8%	9.0%	9.0%
110	28 October 2013	9.7%	9.9%	9.7%	10.4%
111	30 October 2013	8.7%	9.4%	8.1%	8.2%
112	31 October 2013	12.3%	12.3%	12.0%	12.4%
113	1 November 2013	8.0%	8.6%	8.4%	8.3%
114	4 November 2013	9.5%	10.4%	9.9%	9.6%
115	5 November 2013	9.6%	10.2%	9.5%	9.6%
116	6 November 2013	9.3%	9.8%	9.5%	9.8%
117	7 November 2013	9.4%	10.2%	9.6%	9.6%
118	8 November 2013	10.6%	12.3%	9.4%	9.7%
119	11 November 2013	9.4%	9.3%	10.0%	10.2%
120	12 November 2013	9.9%	10.4%	10.1%	10.2%
121	13 November 2013	8.5%	9.5%	10.4%	11.3%
122	14 November 2013	10.1%	11.2%	10.7%	11.4%
123	15 November 2013	8.6%	9.1%	9.9%	10.4%
124	18 November 2013	9.4%	10.5%	10.8%	11.7%
125	19 November 2013	9.2%	9.7%	10.2%	10.8%
126	20 November 2013	8.5%	8.7%	9.9%	10.8%
127	21 November 2013	8.7%	10.0%	9.8%	10.1%
128	22 November 2013	9.9%	11.3%	9.3%	9.3%
129	25 November 2013	9.8%	10.4%	10.0%	10.4%
130	26 November 2013	8.7%	9.3%	9.7%	10.0%
131	27 November 2013	9.0%	9.9%	10.1%	11.1%
132	28 November 2013	9.4%	10.0%	10.1%	10.4%
133	29 November 2013	10.6%	11.1%	10.1%	10.2%
Average		9.0%	9.85%	9.42%	10.04%

== Awards and nominations ==
Year	Award	Category	Recipient	Result
2013	SBS Drama Awards	Excellence Award, Actress in a Weekend/Daily Drama	Kang So-ra	Nominated
2013	SBS Drama Awards	Special Acting Award, Actor in a Weekend/Daily Drama	Lee Soon-jae	Nominated
2013	SBS Drama Awards	Special Acting Award, Actor in a Weekend/Daily Drama	Chun Ho-jin	Nominated
2013	SBS Drama Awards	New Star Award	Im Joo-hwan	Won
2013	SBS Drama Awards	New Star Award	Kang So-ra	Won
2014	2nd Asia Rainbow TV Awards	Best Supporting Actor	Choi Tae-joon	Nominated
2014	2nd Asia Rainbow TV Awards	Outstanding Action Director	Kim Min-soo	Won
