= The Con Artists (2014 film) =

- Theatrical release poster
- Hangul: 기술자들
- Hanja: 技術者들
- RR: Gisuljadeul
- MR: Kisulchadŭl
- Directed by: Kim Hong-sun
- Produced by: Yook Kyung-sam
- Starring: Kim Woo-bin; Kim Yeong-cheol; Ko Chang-seok; Lee Hyun-woo; Jo Yoon-hee; Lim Ju-hwan
- Cinematography: Yoon Joo-hwan
- Edited by: Shin Min-kyung
- Music by: Jeong Jin-ho
- Production company: Trinity Entertainment
- Distributed by: Lotte Entertainment
- Release date: December 24, 2014
- Running time: 116 minutes
- Country: South Korea
- Language: Korean
- Box office: US$18 million

The Con Artists (Korean: 기술자들; lit. 'The Technicians') is a 2014 South Korean heist film directed by Kim Hon-sun, and starring Kim Woo-bin, Kim Yeong-cheol, Ko Chang-seok, and Lee Hyun-woo.

== Plot ==
Ji-hyuk is a safe-cracker who lives the high life by stealing antiques and jewelry. He teams up with genius hacker Jong-bae, planner Goo-in and other fellow "technicians" to steal ₩150 billion (US$110 million) hidden in the Incheon Customs, and they must do it within 40 minutes.

== Cast ==
- Kim Woo-bin as Ji-hyuk
- Kim Yeong-cheol as Boss Cho
- Ko Chang-seok as Goo-in
- Lee Hyun-woo as Jong-bae
- Jo Yoon-hee as Eun-ha
- Lim Ju-hwan as Lee Jo Hwon (Cho's right-hand man)
- Jo Dal-hwan
- Shin Goo as Director Oh
- Kim Ji-an as Skyscraper Guard
- Jung Ji-yoon as Technician assistant
- Ji Seung-hyun
- Heo Ji-won
- Shin Seung-hwan
- Choi Daniel as art gallery owner
- Kim Sung-kyu as Detective team 2 member
- Shin Wonho

== Production ==
Filming in Gwangyang, Incheon and Seoul began in March 2014 and wrapped in August 2014.

It was the first Korean production to film in the city of Abu Dhabi, with locations at the Abu Dhabi International Airport, the Emirates Palace and the Hilton Capital Grand.

== Release ==
The film was released in South Korea on December 24, 2014.

It was also released in North America on January 9, 2015, followed by limited theatrical runs in Taiwan, China, Hong Kong, Singapore, Vietnam and the Philippines.
