= One More Happy Ending =

- Promotional poster
- Genre: Romantic comedy
- Written by: Heo Sung-hee
- Directed by: Kwon Sung-Chan
- Starring: Jang Na-ra; Jung Kyung-ho; Yoo In-na; Kwon Yul; Yoo Da-in; Seo In-young
- Country of origin: South Korea
- Original language: Korean
- No. of episodes: 16

Production
- Running time: 60 minutes
- Production company: MBC

Original release
- Network: MBC
- Release: 20 January – 10 March 2016

One More Happy Ending (Korean: 한번 더 해피엔딩; RR: Hanbeon deo haepiending) is a 2016 South Korean television series starring Jang Na-ra, Jung Kyung-ho, Yoo In-na, Kwon Yul and Yoo Da-in. It aired on MBC TV on Wednesdays and Thursdays at 22:00.

== Synopsis ==
A romantic comedy about a once-popular first generation girl-group, whose members are in their 30s and are living very different lives, and the men they encounter as they fall in love once again.

In the 1990s, Han Mi-mo (Jang Na-ra), Baek Da-jung (Yoo Da-in), Go Dong-mi (Yoo In-na), Hong Ae-ran (Seo In-Young) and Goo Seul-ah (Sandara Park) were once members of the successful idol group "Angels". However, the group struggled internally due to Seul-ah's intolerable attitude and meanness, which was further aggravated by her being the most popular member. Fed up with Seul-ah's selfishness, Mi-mo got into a highly publicized physical fight with her and the group disbanded in 2003.

Retired from show business, the once-divorced Mi-mo now works as a rep for a remarriage consulting business and is expecting to marry her fiancée Jeonghoon. Tragically, Seul-ah rears her head again and Mi-mo is dumped in favor of the popular singer-turned-actress. Her former bandmate Da-jung is also a rep at the same company. She married a rich man, but her marriage is on the rocks. Dong-mi, who was the least popular member in the group, is now an elementary school teacher. Over the years, she has lost her good looks and feels lonely. Ae-ran is a representative for an internet shopping mall. The women are all still friends with the exception of Seul-ah.

Song Soo-hyuk (Jung Kyung-ho) is a reporter and a single father. He has a friend, Goo Hae-joon (Kwon Yul), who is a doctor and single. Song Soo-hyuk and Goo Hae-joon become involved with the women.

== Cast ==
=== Main ===
- Jang Na-ra as Han Mi-mo
  - Lee Young-eun as young Han Mi-mo

Co-owner of remarriage consulting agency "Brave Wedding". Former member of girl's idol group "Angels".

- Jung Kyung-ho as Song Soo-hyuk
  - Choi Kwon-soo as young Song Soo-hyuk

Reporter/photographer of gossip magazine "Masspunch".

- Yoo In-na as Go Dong-mi

Elementary school teacher. Former member of girl's idol group "Angels".

- Kwon Yul as Goo Hae-joon

Neurologist of "Sarang Hospital". Song Soo-hyuk's best friend.

- Yoo Da-in as Baek Da-jung

Co-owner of remarriage consulting agency "Brave Wedding". Former member of girl's idol group "Angels".

- Seo In-young as Hong Ae-ran

Owner of internet shopping mall. Former member of girl's idol group "Angels".

=== Supporting ===
- Kim Tae-hoon as Kim Gun-hak

Baek Da-jung's husband.

- Hwang Sun-hee as Woo Yeon-soo

Ob-gyn doctor of "Sarang Hospital". Goo Hae-joon's ex-wife.

- Park Eun-seok as Bang Dong-bae

Hong Ae-ran's fiancée.

- Ko Kyu-pil as Na Hyun-ki

Reporter/photographer of gossip magazine "Masspunch".

- Kim Sa-gwon as Kim Seung-jae

Han Mi-mo's ex-husband.

- Lee Chae-eun as Jeong Ah-ni

Reporter of gossip magazine "Masspunch".

- Kim Ji-an as Goo Yeon-mi

High school student. Neurology patient of "Sarang Hospital".

- Jin Ki-joo as An Soon-soo

Song Soo-hyuk's deceased wife. Song Min-woo's mother.

- Ahn Hyo-seop as Ahn Jung-woo

Go Dong-mi's boyfriend.

- Kim Dan-yul as Song Min-woo

Song Soo-hyuk's son.

=== Cameo appearances ===
- Sandara Park as Goo Seul-ah (episode 1)
- Lee Dong-ha as Kim Jung-hoon (episode 1, 5)
- Kim So-yeon as Kim Song-Yool (episode 1)
- Kwak Si-yang as Bang Dae-Han, Kim Song-Yool's ex-husband (episode 1)
- Lee Yeon-doo as Song Min-woo's teacher (episode 2, 6)
- Park Hae-mi as Hong Ae-ran's mother (episode 3)
- Kim Min-jun as Lee Wook (episode 3–8)
- Conan O'Brien as himself (episode 10)

== Ratings ==
In the table below, the blue numbers represent the lowest ratings and the red numbers represent the highest ratings.

Episode #	Original broadcast date	Average audience share			
Episode #	Original broadcast date	TNmS Ratings		AGB Nielsen	
Episode #	Original broadcast date	Nationwide	Seoul	Nationwide	Seoul
1	20 January 2016	5.5%	5.9%	5.2%	6.3%
2	21 January 2016	6.1%	7.1%	5.9%	7.2%
3	27 January 2016	5.8%	6.5%	6.3%	7.5%
4	28 January 2016	5.6%	6.4%	6.7%	8.0%
5	3 February 2016	6.2%	6.1%	6.5%	8.1%
6	4 February 2016	6.3%	7.9%	6.9%	8.5%
7	10 February 2016	6.2%	7.6%	5.8%	7.2%
8	11 February 2016	6.2%	7.5%	6.3%	7.6%
9	17 February 2016	6.0%	7.4%	5.6%	7.0%
10	18 February 2016	6.1%	7.4%	5.0%	6.3%
11	24 February 2016	5.9%	6.9%	5.0%	6.0%
12	25 February 2016	5.5%	6.6%	4.7%	5.8%
13	2 March 2016	4.5%	5.1%	3.8%	4.4%
14	3 March 2016	3.6%	4.4%	3.7%	4.5%
15	9 March 2016	3.5%	4.2%	3.2%	3.9%
16	10 March 2016	3.5%	4.1%	3.0%	3.6%
Average		5.41%	6.32%	5.23%	6.37%
