= Lee You-jin (actor) =

South Korean actor (born 1992)

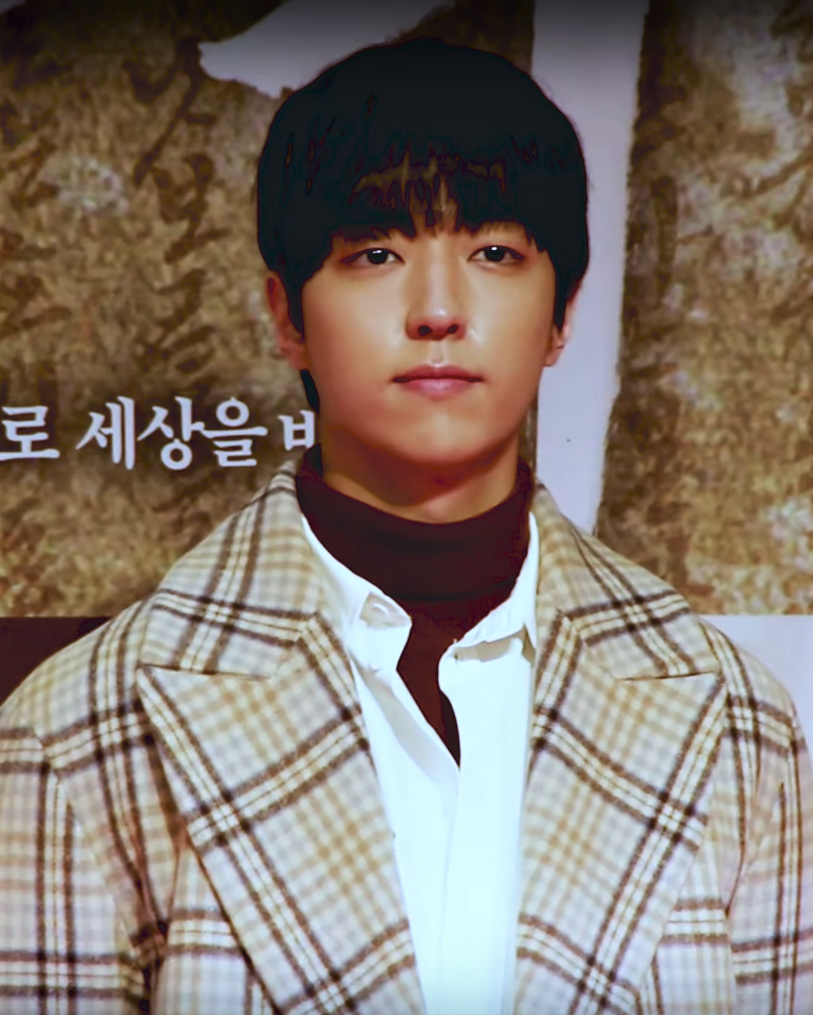
- Born: April 6, 1992 (age 34); Goyang, Gyeonggi Province, South Korea
- Education: Dongguk University – Department of Drama and Film
- Occupation: Actor
- Years active: 2011–present
- Agent: Blossom Entertainment
- Family: Lee Hyo-jung (father); Lee Ki-young (uncle)

Korean name
- Hangul: 이유진
- RR: I Yujin
- MR: I Yujin

Lee You-jin (Korean: 이유진; born April 6, 1992) is a South Korean actor. He is best known for his role as Kwon Ho-chang in the 2017 television series Hello, My Twenties! 2, and the 2019 drama Be Melodramatic.

== Career ==
Lee You-jin participated in Namoo Actors's "Introduction to Rookies" fan meeting on July 8, 2017, alongside Oh Seung-hoon and Song Kang. Tickets sold out within 30 seconds.

== Personal life ==
Lee's father is actor Lee Hyo-jung, and actor Lee Ki-young is his paternal uncle.

== Filmography ==
=== Film ===
Year	Title	Role
2016	Derailed	Seon Bong-gil
2017	Daddy You, Daughter Me	Kang Ji-oh
2018	Be with You	young Woo-jin

=== Television series ===
Year	Title	Role	Ref.
2013	Goddess of Fire	Il Nam	
2014	Dr. Frost	Kim Wook	
2015	Second 20s	Lee Dae-sung	
2017	Hello, My Twenties! 2	Kwon Ho-chang	
2018	Familiar Wife	Jung Hyun-soo	
2019	Be Melodramatic	Kim Hwan-dong	
2020	Do You Like Brahms?	Yoon Dong-yoon	
2021	Idol: The Coup	Piyon	
2022–2023	Three Bold Siblings	Kim Geon-woo	
2024	No Gain No Love	Yeo Ha-jun	

=== Variety show ===
Year	Title	Role	Network	Ref.
2017	Produce 101 (season 2)	Contestant	Mnet	

=== Music video appearances ===
Year	Song Title	Artist	Ref.
2022	"Blended Noise"	PATEKO	

=== Stage ===
Year	Title	Notes	Ref.
2011	The Good Doctor	Play	
2011	Fame	Musical	

== Awards and nominations ==
Name of the award ceremony, year presented, category, nominee of the award, and the result of the nomination
Award ceremony	Year	Category	Nominee / Work	Result	Ref.
KBS Drama Awards	2022	Best New Actor	Three Bold Siblings	Won	
1st Korea Short Drama Awards	2026	Rookie Creator Award	Casting If You See the Way	Won	
