= School 2013 =

2012 South Korean television series

- Promotional poster
- Hangul: 학교 2013
- Hanja: 學校2013
- RR: Hakgyo 2013
- MR: Hakkyo 2013
- Genre: Coming-of-age; Teen
- Written by: Lee Hyun-joo; Go Jung-won
- Directed by: Lee Min-hong; Lee Eung-bok
- Starring: Jang Na-ra; Choi Daniel; Lee Jong-suk; Kim Woo-bin; Park Se-young
- Country of origin: South Korea
- Original language: Korean
- No. of episodes: 16 + 1 special

Production
- Executive producer: Hwang Eui-kyung
- Production location: Korea
- Cinematography: Wi Chang-seok; Kwon Hyuk-gyun
- Editor: Jung Hyun-kyung
- Running time: 70 minutes
- Production companies: Culture Industry Company School LLC, Content K

Original release
- Network: KBS2
- Release: 3 December 2012 – 28 January 2013

School 2013 (Korean: 학교 2013; Hanja: 學校2013; RR: Hakgyo 2013) is a 2012 South Korean television series starring Jang Na-ra, Choi Daniel, Lee Jong-suk, Park Se-young and Kim Woo-bin. The teen drama depicts the struggles and dilemmas that modern-day Korean youth face, such as bullying, student suicides, school violence, deteriorating teacher-student relations, private tutoring and other real-life high school issues, all within the confines of one small classroom at Victory High School.

It is the fifth installment of KBS's School series which aired from 1999 through 2002. It aired on KBS2 from December 3, 2012 to January 28, 2013 on Mondays and Tuesdays at 21:55 (KST) for 16 episodes.

== Synopsis ==
Jung In-jae (Jang Na-ra) and Kang Sae-chan (Choi Daniel) are homeroom teachers whose philosophies are apparently at odds. Together, they manage Victory High's toughest class; facing bullies, academic underachievers, and demanding parents, as they help the students overcome their problems.

== Cast ==
Teachers

- Jang Na-ra as Jung In-jae, homeroom teacher
- Choi Daniel as Kang Se-chan, former top lecturer
- Um Hyo-sup as Uhm Dae-woong "Uhm Force", math teacher
- Park Hae-mi as Im Jung-soo, principal
- Lee Han-wi as Woo Soo-chul, vice principal
- Oh Young-sil as Yoo Nan-hee, ethics teacher
- Yoon Joo-sang as Jo Bong-soo, gym teacher
- Kwon Nam-hee as Kwon Nam-hee
- Kim Yun-ah as Kim Yun-ah
- Lee Won-suk as Kim Dae-soo

Students

- Lee Jong-suk as Go Nam-soon
- Park Se-young as Song Ha-gyeong
- Ryu Hyo-young as Lee Kang-joo
- Kim Woo-bin as Park Heung-soo
- Gil Eun-hye as Gil Eun-hye
- Kwak Jung-wook as Oh Jung-ho
- Choi Chang-yub as Kim Min-ki
- Kim Young-choon as Byun Ki-duk
- Kim Jong-hyun
- Kim Dong-suk as Kim Dong-suk
- Jeon Soo-jin as Kye Na-ri
- Shin Hye-sun as Shin Hye-sun
- Kim Chang-hwan as Han Young-woo
- Lee Ji-hoon as Lee Ji-hoon
- Lee Yi-kyung as Lee Yi-kyung
- Jung Yeon-joo as Student
- Ahn Ji-hyun as Ahn Ji-hyun
- Kim Dani

== Ratings ==
Ep.	Original broadcast date	Average audience share			
Ep.	Original broadcast date	Nielsen Korea		TNmS	
Ep.	Original broadcast date	Nationwide	Seoul	Nationwide	Seoul
1	December 3, 2012	8.0%	8.6%	8.2%	8.6%
2	December 4, 2012	8.2%	8.8%	10.0%	10.9%
3	December 10, 2012	10.8%	11.8%	11.5%	12.7%
4	December 11, 2012	8.9%	9.4%	10.4%	10.8%
5	December 17, 2012	9.8%	10.7%	12.9%	13.5%
6	December 18, 2012	11.5%	12.7%	12.9%	14.2%
7	December 24, 2012	10.2%	11.1%	11.7%	12.1%
8	December 25, 2012	12.9%	14.3%	14.8%	16.5%
9	January 1, 2013	15.2%	16.8%	15.7%	16.3%
10	January 7, 2013	13.1%	14.6%	14.7%	15.1%
11	January 8, 2013	15.8%	17.3%	16.3%	18.0%
12	January 14, 2013	14.5%	16.4%	16.1%	17.3%
13	January 15, 2013	15.5%	17.3%	17.1%	18.3%
14	January 21, 2013	14.0%	16.1%	15.1%	15.9%
15	January 22, 2013	15.7%	17.3%	15.3%	16.2%
16	January 28, 2013	15.0%	17.0%	16.0%	17.1%
Average		12.4%	13.7%	13.7%	14.6%
Special	January 29, 2013	11.5%	12.7%	12.7%	13.3%
In the table above, the blue numbers represent the lowest ratings and the red numbers represent the highest ratings.

== Awards and nominations ==
Year	Award	Category	Recipient	Result
2012	KBS Drama Awards	Top Excellence Award, Actress	Jang Na-ra	Nominated
2012	KBS Drama Awards	Excellence Award, Actor in a Miniseries	Choi Daniel	Nominated
2012	KBS Drama Awards	Excellence Award, Actress in a Miniseries	Jang Na-ra	Won
2012	KBS Drama Awards	Best New Actor	Lee Jong-suk	Won
2012	KBS Drama Awards	Popularity Award, Actor	Choi Daniel	Nominated
2012	KBS Drama Awards	Popularity Award, Actor	Lee Jong-suk	Nominated
2012	KBS Drama Awards	Popularity Award, Actress	Jang Na-ra	Nominated
2013	49th Baeksang Arts Awards	Best Drama	School 2013	Nominated
2013	49th Baeksang Arts Awards	Best New Actor (TV)	Kim Woo-bin	Nominated
2013	7th Mnet 20's Choice Awards	20's Drama Star, Male	Lee Jong-suk	Nominated
2013	7th Mnet 20's Choice Awards	20's Booming Star, Male	Kim Woo-bin	Nominated
2013	6th Korea Drama Awards	Best New Actor	Kim Woo-bin	Nominated
2013	2nd APAN Star Awards	Excellence Award, Actor	Lee Jong-suk	Won
2013	2nd APAN Star Awards	Best New Actor	Kim Woo-bin	Won
