= Park Shin-yang =

South Korean actor (born 1968)

- Born: November 1, 1968 (age 58); Seoul, South Korea
- Education: Dongguk University
- Occupation: Actor
- Years active: 1996–present
- Spouse: Baek Hae-jin (m. 2002)
- Children: 1

Korean name
- Hangul: 박신양
- Hanja: 朴新陽
- RR: Bak Sinyang
- MR: Pak Sinyang

Park Shin-yang (Korean: 박신양; born November 1, 1968) is a South Korean actor and painter. He is known for starring in the films The Letter (1997), A Promise (1998), Hi! Dharma! (2001), The Big Swindle (2004), and Man on the Edge (2013), as well as the television series Lovers in Paris (2004), War of Money (2007), Painter of the Wind (2008), Sign (2011), and My Lawyer, Mr. Jo (2016). His performance in War of Money earned him the Best Actor – Television award at the 44th Baeksang Arts Awards.

== Career ==
A graduate of Dongguk University and the Shevkin Theater School in Russia, Park debuted in the Buddhist film Yuri in 1996. He became famous after appearing in the hit melodramas The Letter (1997) and A Promise (1998). Park earned several Best Actor prizes for his role in A Promise.

In the early 2000s, Park continued to appear in major films such as the gangster comedy Hi! Dharma! as well as heist thriller The Big Swindle.

In 2004, he gained wide recognition as one of South Korea's lead actors with the television series Lovers in Paris. With an average viewership rating of 40+% and a peak of 56.3%, the series became one of the highest rated Korean dramas of all time. Park was recognized for his performance, winning the Grand Prize (Daesang) with his costar Kim Jung-eun at the SBS Drama Awards. The drama sparked many trends and parodies with entertainers mimicking Park’s famous lines "Let’s go, baby!" and "Why can't you say it? Why can't you say that this is my man, that this is the man I love?" in variety shows.

He also starred in the television drama War of Money (2007), a huge ratings hit, and earned the Grand Prize for a second time at the SBS Drama Awards. The series was extended for four episodes, with the producers agreeing to pay Park a fee of ₩170 million per episode. However, they later reneged on the deal, alleging that Park tried to capitalize on the drama's high popularity by asking for too much money. Park took legal action, and in November 2009, he won the lawsuit. Consequently, the Corea Drama Production Association (CODA) banned Park from appearing in any dramas produced by members of the association for an indefinite period.

During the lawsuit, Park starred in the critically acclaimed historical drama Painter of the Wind (2008) alongside Moon Geun-young.

The ban was lifted in 2011, after which Park returned to TV after a three-year absence. He appeared the medical drama Sign (2011).

In early 2013, Park starred in the comedy film Man on the Edge, a box office hit.

After a five-year hiatus, Park made his TV comeback in 2016 with the KBS2 legal drama My Lawyer, Mr. Jo. In 2019, he reprised his role in the drama's second season.

== Personal life ==
Park married Baek Hae-jin in 2002. They have a daughter, Park Seung-chae.

In 2004, the Museum of Tolstoi appointed Park as ambassador in South Korea.

Park applied for a Master's degree program in Fine Arts and Western Painting at Andong University.

== Filmography ==
=== Film ===
| Year | Title | Role | Notes/Ref. |
|---|---|---|---|
| 1996 | Yuri | Yuri | |
| 1997 | Poison | | |
| 1997 | The Letter | Hwan-yoo | |
| 1997 | Motel Cactus | Kim Suk-tae | |
| 1998 | A Promise | Gong Sang-du | |
| 1999 | White Valentine | Park Hyun-jun | |
| 2000 | Kilimanjaro | Hae-cheol / Hae-shik | |
| 2001 | Indian Summer | Seo Jun-ha | |
| 2001 | Hi! Dharma! | Jae-gyu | |
| 2003 | The Uninvited | Kang Jung-won | |
| 2004 | The Big Swindle | Choi Chang-hyeok | |
| 2004 | Hi! Dharma 2: Showdown in Seoul | Jae-gyu | Cameo |
| 2007 | Meet Mr. Daddy | Woo Jong-dae | |
| 2012 | Miss Conspirator | Baek Bong-nam | |
| 2013 | Man on the Edge | Gwang-ho | |
| 2024 | Devils Stay | | |

=== Television series ===
| Year | Title | Role | Notes |
|---|---|---|---|
| 1996 | Power of Love | Moon Dong Hui | |
| 1996 | Apple Blossom's Fragrance | | |
| 1998 | Fascinate my Heart | Seok-chan Yun | |
| 2004 | Lovers in Paris | Han Ki-joo | |
| 2007 | War of Money | Geum Na-ra | |
| 2008 | Painter of the Wind | Kim Hong-do | |
| 2011 | Sign | Yoon Ji-hoon | |
| 2016 | My Lawyer, Mr. Jo | Jo Deul-ho | |
| 2019 | My Lawyer, Mr. Jo 2: Crime and Punishment | Jo Deul-ho | |

=== Variety show ===
| Year | Title | Notes |
|---|---|---|
| 2016 | Actor School | |
| 2017 | The Traveler’s Guide to My Room | |

== Awards and nominations ==
Year presented, name of the award ceremony, award category, nominated work and the result of the nomination
| Year | Award | Category | Nominated work | Result | Ref. |
|---|---|---|---|---|---|
| 1996 | 17th Blue Dragon Film Awards | Best New Actor | Yuri | Won | |
| 1997 | 33rd Baeksang Arts Awards | Best New Actor – Film | Yuri | Won | |
| 1997 | 35th Grand Bell Awards | Best New Actor | Yuri | Nominated | |
| 1997 | 18th Blue Dragon Film Awards | Best Leading Actor | Motel Cactus | Nominated | |
| 1998 | 18th Korean Association of Film Critics Awards | Best New Actor | The Letter | Won | |
| 1998 | 18th Korean Association of Film Critics Awards | Most Popular Actor | The Letter | Won | |
| 1998 | 21st Golden Cinematography Awards | Most Popular Actor | The Letter | Won | |
| 1998 | 34th Baeksang Arts Awards | Most Popular Actor – Film | The Letter | Won | |
| 1998 | 34th Baeksang Arts Awards | Best Actor – Film | The Letter | Nominated | |
| 1998 | SBS Drama Awards | Top Excellence Award, Actor | Fascinate My Heart | Nominated | |
| 1998 | 19th Blue Dragon Film Awards | Best Leading Actor | A Promise | Won | |
| 1998 | 19th Blue Dragon Film Awards | Most Popular Actor | A Promise | Won | |
| 1999 | 7th Chunsa Film Art Awards | Best Actor | A Promise | Won | |
| 1999 | 35th Baeksang Arts Awards | Best Actor – Film | A Promise | Nominated | |
| 1999 | 36th Grand Bell Awards | Best Actor | A Promise | Nominated | |
| 2004 | 41st Grand Bell Awards | Best Actor | The Big Swindle | Nominated | |
| 2004 | 25th Blue Dragon Film Awards | Best Leading Actor | The Big Swindle | Nominated | |
| 2004 | 5th Korea Visual Arts Festival | Photogenic Award, TV category | Lovers in Paris | Won | |
| 2004 | SBS Drama Awards | Grand Prize (Daesang) | Lovers in Paris | Won | |
| 2004 | SBS Drama Awards | Top Excellence Award, Actor | Lovers in Paris | Nominated | |
| 2004 | SBS Drama Awards | Excellence Award, Actor in a Drama Special | Lovers in Paris | Nominated | |
| 2004 | SBS Drama Awards | Top 10 Stars | Lovers in Paris | Won | |
| 2005 | 41st Baeksang Arts Awards | Best Actor – Television | Lovers in Paris | Nominated | |
| 2007 | 24th Korean Swan Best Dresser Awards | Swan Best Actor in TV | War of Money | Won | |
| 2007 | SBS Drama Awards | Grand Prize (Daesang) | War of Money | Won | |
| 2007 | SBS Drama Awards | Top Excellence Award, Actor | War of Money | Nominated | |
| 2007 | SBS Drama Awards | Netizen Award | War of Money | Won | |
| 2007 | SBS Drama Awards | Top 10 Stars | War of Money | Won | |
| 2008 | 44th Baeksang Arts Awards | Best Actor – Television | War of Money | Won | |
| 2008 | 35th Korea Broadcasting Association Awards | Best Actor | War of Money | Nominated | |
| 2008 | SBS Drama Awards | Top Excellence Award, Actor | Painter of the Wind | Nominated | |
| 2011 | SBS Drama Awards | Top Excellence Award, Actor in a Drama Special | Sign | Nominated | |
| 2016 | 9th Korea Drama Awards | Grand Prize (Daesang) | My Lawyer, Mr. Jo | Nominated | |
| 2016 | KBS Drama Awards | Grand Prize (Daesang) | My Lawyer, Mr. Jo | Nominated | |
| 2016 | KBS Drama Awards | Top Excellence Award, Actor | My Lawyer, Mr. Jo | Won | |
| 2016 | KBS Drama Awards | Excellence Award, Actor in a Mid-length Drama | My Lawyer, Mr. Jo | Nominated | |
| 2019 | 12th Korea Drama Awards | Top Excellence Award, Actor | My Lawyer, Mr. Jo 2: Crime and Punishment | Nominated | |
| 2019 | KBS Drama Awards | Grand Prize (Daesang) | My Lawyer, Mr. Jo 2: Crime and Punishment | Nominated | |
| 2019 | KBS Drama Awards | Top Excellence Award, Actor | My Lawyer, Mr. Jo 2: Crime and Punishment | Nominated | |
| 2019 | KBS Drama Awards | Excellence Award, Actor in Mid-length Drama | My Lawyer, Mr. Jo 2: Crime and Punishment | Nominated | |
