= Mina (TV series) =

South Korean drama series

- Hangul: 미나
- RR: Mina
- MR: Mina
- Genre: Drama, Romance
- Written by: Seo Hyun-joo
- Directed by: Kim Jae-soon
- Starring: Chae Jung-an; Kim Sa-rang; Kim Seung-soo; Ahn Jae-mo
- Country of origin: South Korea
- No. of episodes: 16

Production
- Executive producer: Lee Gyu-hwan
- Producer: Lee Seong-yeon
- Running time: Mondays and Tuesdays at 21:50 (KST)
- Production company: Video Heaven

Original release
- Network: Korean Broadcasting System
- Release: November 5 – December 24, 2001

Mina (Korean: 미나) is a South Korean television series that aired on KBS2 in 2001.

== Plot ==
Park Mina, a highly popular singer who's won the hearts of many fans, gets into a car accident when her car swerves to avoid an oncoming vehicle. The car, which fell into a ditch, explodes and causes Mina to suffer second, third and fourth-degree burns on her body.

Mina's manager Kang Joon-seo happens to find Kim Soo-ryun, who looks almost exactly like Mina. Joon-seo initially asks Soo-ryun to take Mina's place for a short period of time until the real singer recovers. Soo-ryun agrees to the proposal because she badly needs money for her mother's surgical fees and her brother's tuition. After undergoing rigorous training from Joon-seo, Soo-ryun emerges as a near-perfect replica of Mina. However, Soo-ryun falls in love with Mina's boyfriend Jung Tae-hoon, and becomes enamored with fame and fortune.

Meanwhile, the real Mina returns, but the plastic surgeons were unable to restore her original appearance. Joon-seo, thinking that fans would not accept her new face, refuses to allow Mina to continue her singing career. Mina goes on television to reveal her true identity, and as Tae-hoon begins to investigate, Soo-ryun and Joon-seo feel threatened.

Mina later learns that Soo-ryun is her identical twin sister, and they had been abandoned at a Catholic orphanage after birth.

Soo-ryun asks Tae-hoon to forgive her, but he rejects her when he realizes that Joon-seo and Soo-ryun conspired to prevent the real Mina from coming back.

Depressed, Soo-ryun attempts to commit suicide. But Joon-seo stops her in time and tells her to prepare her final performance as Mina.

== Cast ==
- Chae Jung-an as Kim Soo-ryun/Park Mi-na
- Kim Sa-rang as Park Mi-na (after surgery)
- Kim Seung-soo as Jung Tae-hoon
- Ahn Jae-mo as Kang Joon-seo
- Shin Ae as Ha Yoon-soo
- Kim Min-ho as Park Hyuk
- Kang Yi-seul as Yeo Jin-hoo
- Han Jin-hee as Geum-bok
- Han Hye-sook as Choon-ja
- Yoon Ji-heon
- Choi Sang-hak as Soo-young
- Baek Il-seob
- Kim Min-jung
- Oh Ji-hye
- Lee Chang-hoon as Director Kang
- Cha Joo-ok
- Kim Mu-saeng
- Hong Choong-min
