= Dear Heaven =

South Korean television series

- Promotional poster
- Also known as: Love in Heaven; Dear God
- Hangul: 하늘이시여
- Lit.: Dear Sky
- RR: Haneurisiyeo
- MR: Hanŭrisiyŏ
- Genre: Melodrama; Romance
- Written by: Im Sung-han
- Directed by: Lee Young-hee; Shin Yoon-seob
- Starring: Yoon Jung-hee; Lee Tae-gon; Cho Yeon-woo; Lee Soo-kyung; Wang Bit-na
- Country of origin: South Korea
- Original language: Korean
- No. of episodes: 85

Production
- Executive producer: Yoon Young-muk
- Producers: Jo Dong-suk; Lee Hyun-suk
- Running time: 60 minutes
- Production companies: Korean Broadcasting Entertainment for Satellite & Terrestrial (K-BEST), Inc.

Original release
- Network: SBS TV
- Release: 10 September 2005 – 2 July 2006

Dear Heaven (Korean: 하늘이시여) is a South Korean television series starring Yoon Jung-hee, Lee Tae-gon, Cho Yeon-woo, Lee Soo-kyung, and Wang Bit-na. It aired on SBS TV from September 10, 2005, to July 2, 2006, on Saturdays and Sundays at 20:45 for 85 episodes.

According to AGB Nielsen Media Research, it was the 5th highest rated TV program in Korea for the year 2006, with an average rating of 28.3%, and a peak rating of 44.5%.

The popular soap opera invited both criticism and high ratings for its provocative plot. The story revolved around a middle-aged woman who introduces her handsome news anchor stepson to her abandoned daughter, who had led a miserable life because of a cruel stepmother. It triggered controversy when the woman was revealed as the girl's biological mother. Viewers were divided on whether it was "immoral" and "incestuous" or a fresh take on relationship dramas, but director Lee Young-hee insisted that the show's theme was "deep maternal love, with a mother reclaiming her own daughter as a daughter-in-law in order to atone for having abandoned her as a baby."

== Plot ==
When she was very young, Ji Young-sun (Han Hye-sook) gave away her baby Lee Ja-kyung after giving birth to her. She later remarries and creates a new family, but soon after, her husband dies, leaving her behind with her stepson Gu Wang-mo (Lee Tae-gon), and her daughter Gu Seul-ah (Lee Soo-kyung).

Now grown and a makeup artist, Lee Ja-kyung (Yoon Jung-hee) finds herself adrift with loneliness since her foster parents died when she was a child. She fell in love with her step-uncle but his family shuns her, dashing away any hopes of being with him. Deciding to focus on her career and find a new love, she meets Wang-mo, a TV news anchor.

Young-sun has been searching for the daughter whom she had abandoned in her youth. As if guided by the hand of fate, she discovers that Ja-kyung is already going out with Young-sun's own stepson, Wang-mo. In order to keep her secret daughter by her side, Young-sun does everything in her power to marry Ja-kyung to Wang-mo, and eventually succeeds. The two women form a curious double relationship, as at once mother/daughter and mother-in-law/daughter-in-law.

== Cast ==
- Yoon Jung-hee as Lee Ja-kyung
- Lee Tae-gon as Gu Wang-mo

Gu family

- Han Hye-sook as Ji Young-sun
- Lee Soo-kyung as Gu Seul-ah
- Jung Hye-sun as Hwang Maria (paternal grandmother)

Kang family

- Wang Bit-na as Kang Ye-ri (TV news anchor)
- Kang Ji-sub as Kang Yi-ri (brother)
- Hyun Suk as Kang Dong-choon (father)
- Lee Bo-hee as Kim Mi-hyang (mother)
- Park Hae-mi as Kim Bae-deuk (aunt, Mi-hyang's sister)

Lee family

- Im Chae-moo as Lee Hong-pa (Young-sun's first love)
- Ban Hyo-jung as Mo Ran-shil (Hong-pa's mother)
- Kim Young-ran as Bong Eun-ji (Hong-pa's wife)

Extended cast

- Cho Yeon-woo as Kim Cheong-ha (movie star)
- Geum Dan-bi as Mun-ok (Ja-kyung's friend)
- Lee Sook as Bae-deuk's friend
- Lee Dae-ro as Bae-deuk's dancing partner

== Awards ==
2005 SBS Drama Awards

- New Star Award: Cho Yeon-woo
- New Star Award: Lee Tae-gon
- New Star Award: Yoon Jung-hee

2006 SBS Drama Awards

- Grand Prize (Daesang): Han Hye-sook
- Top 10 Stars: Han Hye-sook
