= Lim Ju-hwan =

South Korean actor (born 1982)

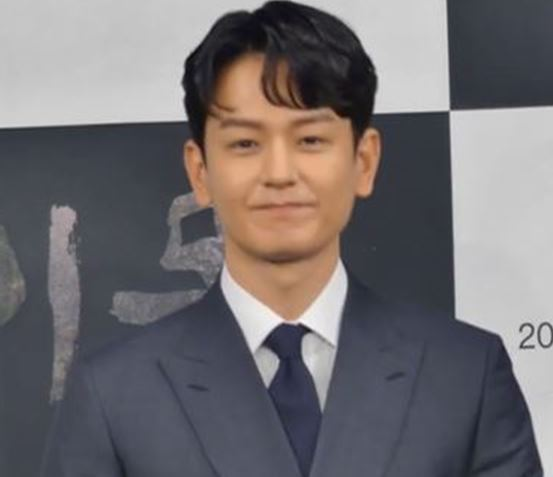
- Lim in May 2019
- Born: May 18, 1982 (age 44); Seoul, South Korea
- Other name: Im Joo-hwan
- Education: Daejin University (Theatre and Film)
- Occupation: Actor
- Years active: 2003–present
- Agent: FL Ent

Korean name
- Hangul: 임주환
- Hanja: 林周煥
- RR: Im Juhwan
- MR: Im Chuhwan

Lim Ju-hwan (Korean: 임주환; born May 18, 1982) is a South Korean actor. He is best known for his leading roles in the television dramas Tamra, the Island (2009), Ugly Alert (2013), Uncontrollably Fond (2016) and The Bride of Habaek (2017).

== Early life and education ==
When he was a senior in high school, Lim joined the theater group called Kwangto, an acronym of Kwangdae Tokkaebi referring to traditional performers and hobgoblins in Korean, where he was first introduced to theatrical performance. Lim then played the role of the pastor in The Good Doctor by Neil Simon and won the prize of best performance in the Fourth Youth Theater Festival in 2000. He also directed the play, Pay Tuition Back, at the school festival. He continues to maintain a good friendship with fellow actor Shin Dong-wook, whom he met at the time.

After graduating from high school, Lim began his professional career in modeling at The Men, a modeling and acting agency.

He also enrolled at Daejin University for his undergraduate and graduate studies in theatre and film.

== Career ==
=== 2004–2008: Beginnings ===
Lim made his first professional television debut on Magic, aired on SBS in 2004, and made his film debut in A Millionaire's First Love in 2006, followed by a series of supporting roles, notably in The Snow Queen (2006) and Boys Over Flowers (2009). He received favorable reviews for his performance as a blind painter in episode 10 of Auction House, a 2007 TV series revolving around the art world which aired on MBC.

=== 2009–2010: Rising popularity and breakthrough ===
Lim's breakthrough came in his first leading role in the 2009 MBC series Tamra, the Island. Set in Jeju Island, Haenam in South Jeolla Province, it was a hybrid form of TV drama that combined romantic comedy and historical fiction. It portrayed the relationship between Koreans and foreigners in 17th century Joseon. Though it received low ratings, Tamra, the Island gained a cult following. Lim later won New Actor of the Year at the 2009 Korean Culture and Entertainment Awards for his performance.

To capitalize on his growing fan base in Japan due to Tamra, the Island, Lim starred in the 2-episode special drama Marriage War of Doenjang-kun and Natto-chan, about a Korean man and a Japanese woman who fall in love while working together on a Korea-Japan joint project.

=== 2011–2012: Military enlistment ===
Bae Suzy and Lim Ju-hwan at Uncontrollably Fond press conference, 4 July 2016

What's Up, the long-delayed musical campus drama that Lim filmed in 2010, finally aired on cable channel MBN in 2011. It was written by renowned drama scribe Song Ji-na (Sandglass) and is the story of college students learning acting and performance arts in the university's musical theatre department. Lim played the leading role of Jang Je-hun, a cynical outsider who becomes completely immersed in the world of musicals. He followed that with a supporting role as a warm-hearted homeless man with Tourette's syndrome in the film The Suicide Forecast in 2011.

In 2011, Lim enlisted for his mandatory military service. During basic training, he fainted due to heart problems and was hospitalized for 3 months. He then completed his service despite being given the option for an early discharge. Prior to entering military service Lim left his agency Yedang Entertainment.

=== 2013–present: New agency and comeback ===
After his military discharge he moved to Blossom Entertainment. In 2013, he made his acting comeback in the lead role as a devoted brother in 2013 SBS daily drama Ugly Alert, followed by a villain role in the 2014 film The Con Artists as well as supporting roles in historical drama Shine or Go Crazy and romantic comedy series Oh My Ghost in 2015, romance melodrama Uncontrollably Fond in 2016, and fantasy romance series The Bride of Habaek in 2017. He acted as a Japanese prosecutor Fukuda in 2019 MBC's period spy drama, Different Dreams.

In June 2024, Lim signed with new agency FL Ent.

== Filmography ==
=== Film ===
Year	Title	Role	Ref.
2006	A Millionaire's First Love	Seung-joon	
2006	Arang	young Hyun-ki	
2007	M	Umbrella man	
2008	A Frozen Flower	Han-baek	
2008	Do Re Mi Fa So La Ti Do	Yoon Jae-kwang	
2011	The Suicide Forecast	Kim Young-tak	
2014	The Con Artists	Lee Jo-hwon	
2017	Because I Love You	Chan-young	
2021	Waiting for Rain	Park Young-hwan	
2022	Project Wolf Hunting	CEO	

=== Television series ===
Year	Title	Role	Notes	Ref.
2003	Nonstop 3	Blind date		
2004	Magic	Kang-jae's acquaintance brother		
2005	A Love to Kill	Actor role with Eun-suk		
2006	Don't Worry	Lee Hyun-jun		
2006	The Snow Queen	Seo Geon-ho		
2006	Urban Legend, Not Scary	Yoon Hyun-soo		
2007	The Return of Shim Chung	Prince Lee Hong		
2007	Drama City: Pure Soon-yi	Park Joon-su		
2007	Auction House	Lee Ji-woon	Guest (Ep. 10)	
2008	Single Dad in Love	Min Hyun-ki		
2008	General Hospital 2	Lee Min-soo	Guest (Ep, 6–7)	
2009	Boys Over Flowers	So Il-hyun		
2009	Tamra, the Island	Park Gyu		
2010	Marriage War of Doenjang-kun and Natto-chan	Kim Dae-chun		
2011	What's Up	Jang Jae-hun		
2012	March 2	Air chan		
2013	Ugly Alert	Gong Joon-soo		
2014	Drama Festival: The Diary of Heong Yeong-dang	Kim Sang-yun		
2015	Shine or Go Crazy	Wang Uk		
2015	Oh My Ghost	Choi Sung-jae		
2016	Uncontrollably Fond	Choi Ji-tae		
2017	The Bride of Habaek	Hoo-ye		
2018	Drama Special: Such a Long Farewell	Bae Sang-hee		
2019	Different Dreams	Fukuda		
2019	The Great Show	Kang Joon-ho		
2020	The Game: Towards Zero	Gu Do-kyung		
2020	The Spies Who Loved Me	Derek Hyun		
2022	Three Bold Siblings	Lee Sang-joon		

=== Television shows ===
Year	Title	Role	Notes	Ref.
2021–2023	Unexpected Business	Cast member	with Cha Tae-hyun and Zo In-sung — Season 3 (Season 2 as Guest)	

=== Music video appearances ===
Year	Song	Artist	Ref.
2006	"Key of Heart"	BoA	
2017	"Miss You"	Huh Gak	

== Theater ==
Year	Title		Role	Theater	Date	Ref.
Year	English	Korean	Role	Theater	Date	Ref.
2000	The Good Doctor	굿 닥터	Pastor	Theater Group Kwangto	NA	
2002	Our Town	우리 읍내	—	Theater Group Kwangto	NA	
2021	A Streetcar Named Desire	욕망이라는 이름의 전차	Stanley Kowalski	Hongdae Arts Center Grand Theater	October 8 to November 21	
2024	The Best Play Festival 10: Kilology	연극열전10: 킬롤로지	Paul	Daehak-ro TOM 2	September 27 to December 1	

== Awards and nominations ==
Year	Award	Category	Nominated work	Result	Ref.
2009	17th Korean Culture and Entertainment Awards	Best New Actor	Tamra, the Island	Won	
2009	MBC Drama Awards	Best New Actor	Tamra, the Island	Nominated	
2013	SBS Drama Awards	New Star Award	Ugly Alert	Won	
2013	SBS Drama Awards	Best Couple Award with Kang So-ra	Ugly Alert	Nominated	
2019	14th Asia Model Awards	Korean Model Star	—N/a	Won	
2019	MBC Drama Awards	Excellence Award, Actor in a Monday-Tuesday Miniseries	Different Dreams	Nominated	
2020	39th MBC Drama Awards	Excellence Award, Actor in a Wednesday-Thursday Miniseries	The Game: Towards Zero	Won	
2020	39th MBC Drama Awards	Excellence Award, Actor in a Wednesday-Thursday Miniseries	The Spies Who Loved Me	Won	
2022	KBS Drama Awards	Excellence Award, Actor in a Serial Drama	Three Bold Siblings	Won	
2022	KBS Drama Awards	Popularity Award, Actor	Three Bold Siblings	Nominated	
