= Tamra, the Island =

South Korean television series

- Also known as: Tamra, the Island; Tempted Again; Shipwrecked
- Based on: Tamra, the Island by Jung Hye-na
- Written by: Shin Jae-won; Lee Ji-hyang; Choi Yi-rang
- Directed by: Yoon Sang-ho; Hong Jong-chan
- Starring: Seo Woo; Im Joo-hwan; Pierre Deporte
- Country of origin: South Korea
- Original languages: Korean; Jeju Language
- No. of episodes: 20

Production
- Production companies: Group Eight; Hunus Entertainment

Original release
- Network: Munhwa Broadcasting Corporation
- Release: August 8 – September 27, 2009

Tamra, the Island (Korean: 탐나는도다; RR: Tamnaneun doda) is a 2009 South Korean television series starring Seo Woo, Im Joo-hwan and Pierre Deporte. It aired on MBC from August 8 to September 27, 2009 on Saturdays and Sundays at 19:55 for 20 episodes.

It is a historical drama set in the 17th century during the European colonial expansion into the Far East. Themes of racial tension and xenophobia, social inequality, and rumination on the effect of foreign policy and international trade on the quotidien are prevalent throughout the series; however, the romantic comedy aspect remains at the forefront for the majority of the narrative.

== Synopsis ==
William J. Spencer (Pierre Deporte) is a young British aristocrat in the year 1640 with a fascination for East Asian art, languages, and culture. He counts as his closest friend the young somewhat mercenary Japanese merchantman Yan. William is swindled by a shady merchant into believing that a plain porcelain chamber pot is a mystical artifact; he then sails off to Nagasaki in order to open the "aquatic silk road" between Japan and England, but mostly to escape his creepy and overbearing mother and an arranged marriage. Yan is promised a handsome reward if he can drag her son back in time for the wedding and hightails it after his "friend."

Meanwhile, the Joseon Kingdom is operating under a foreign policy that strictly prohibits trade with Westerners, garnering the nickname "the hermit kingdom." Just south of the Korean mainland lies the island of Jeju, which at this point in history is known as Tamna. The people who live on the island derive their livelihoods by diving for abalone, cultivating a large area of persimmon orchards, and basic subsistence farming; much of what they produce is tithed to the King through a corrupt local government.

Park Gyu (Im Joo-hwan) arrives from Hanyang (the historical name for Seoul) on a secret mission from the King to uncover corruption, embezzlement, and whatever else he may find on Tamna. However, his cover story leads to a tangle of complications for him: used to being doted on as an aristocratic scholar and high government official, he is sent to Tamna on the pretense of having been at the center of a sexual harassment scandal for which he has been permanently banished to the island, where he will have to work for a local family despite not being used to manual labor.

Tamna native Jang Beo-jin (Seo Woo) is an abalone diver whose mother is the leader of all the village divers (haenyo lit. "sea women"). Unfortunately for Beo-jin, she didn't inherit her mother's gifts or prowess for diving. She is the lowest of the apprentice divers after eight years and she is constantly being berated by her mother and all the other divers; she manages to mess up every chance she is given.

Her first meeting with Park Gyu comes when she is sent to deliver some abalone to the village elders for a religious ceremony but ends up knocking down the altar and Park Gyu, and losing the medallion that entitles her family to a lower tithe to the King. Believing it to be in Park Gyu's possession, she tries to get it back from the upright and uptight noble, who is later sent to live with Beo-jin's family on the same day that William is shipwrecked off the coast; Beo-jin hides him, and later Yan as well, in a cave outside the village.

== Cast ==
=== Main cast ===
- Seo Woo as Jang Beo-jin
- Im Joo-hwan as Park Gyu
- Pierre Deporte as William Spencer
- Lee Seung-min as Seo-rin
- Lee Seon-ho as Yan Kawamura

=== Supporting cast ===
- Kim Mi-kyung as Choi Jang-nyeo, Beo-jin's mother
- Byun Woo-min as Jang Won-bin, Beo-jin's father
- Kim Yoo-jung as Jang Beo-seol, Beo-jin's younger sister
- Yang Hee-kyung as Mr. Eom's wife, Park Gyu's birth mother
- Lee Ho-jae as Park Chul, Park Gyu's birth father
- Seo Beom-shik as Jeon Chi-yong
- Park Joon as nobleman Song
- Park Woong as ancestral rites priest
- Lee Ho-seong as exiled King Gwanghaegun.
- Jo Seung-yeon as assistant governor Kim Yi-bang
- Bang Eun-hee as Go Ba-soon
- Jung Joo-ri as Han Kkeut-boon
- Kim Ho-won as Hyang Dol-yi
- Yoo Tae-woong as Han Philip
- Jang Kyung-ah as Hong Shi-yeon
- Kim Byeong-chun as public official Ahn
- Song Gwi-hyun as Hong Goo-rak
- Robert Holley as Jan Jansz Weltevree (Park Yeon)
- Lee Byung-joon as King Injo
- So Young-don as Crown Prince Sohyeon
- Goo Bon-im as Jong-dal's mother
- Jo Moon-ui as Jong-dal's father
- Park Hee-jin as Jong-dal
- Kim Hyun-ah as woman from Kang-jin
- Lee Han-wi as Lee Sa-pyeong, potter
- Lee Jung-sub as Kim Hoon-jang
- Lee Hae-woo as Hyang Dul-yi

== Production ==
The drama had been planned for 20 episodes (and filmed months in advance) but in its original run, MBC cut it down to 16 episodes due to low ratings despite fan fervor and general praise. As a result, beginning with episode 11, the production had to quickly edit down the remaining ten episodes into six, leaving a lot of material on the cutting room floor. The overseas broadcasts aired all 20 episodes, while the Director's Cut DVD release features 21 episodes.

== Awards ==
2009 17th Korean Culture and Entertainment Awards

- Best New Actor: Im Joo-hwan

2009 MBC Drama Awards

- Best New Actor: Im Joo-hwan
- Best New Actress: Seo Woo
- Popularity Award, Actress: Seo Woo

== International broadcast ==
It aired in Japan on cable channel Mnet beginning October 26, 2009.

It aired in Thailand on Channel 7 every Thursday to Friday at 8.30 a.m. starting from October 11, 2012.
