= The Genealogy =

- Poster for The Genealogy (1979)
- Hangul: 족보
- Hanja: 族譜
- RR: Jokbo
- MR: Chokpo
- Directed by: Im Kwon-taek
- Written by: Han Un-sa
- Produced by: Park Chong-chan
- Starring: Joo Sun-tae; Hah Myung-joong
- Cinematography: Lee Suck-ki
- Edited by: Kim Hee-su
- Music by: Jeong Min-seob
- Distributed by: Hwa Chun Trading Company
- Release date: May 1, 1979
- Running time: 110 minutes
- Country: South Korea
- Language: Korean

The Genealogy (Korean: 족보) is a 1979 South Korean film directed by Im Kwon-taek.

== Synopsis ==
During the era of Japanese occupation, Sol Jin-young, a Korean patriarch refuses to obey the law to change the family's name to a Japanese name. Tani, a member of the Japanese occupation forces, is sent to persuade Sol to comply with the order. Tani is conflicted between his duty, his respect for Korean culture and his attraction to Sol's daughter.

== Cast ==
- Joo Sun-tae
- Hah Myung-joong
- Han Hye-sook
- Choi Nam-Hyun
- Kim Sin-jae
- Yoon Yang-ha
- Ju Sang-ho
- Kim Seok-hun
- Dok Go-sung

== Bibliography ==
- Jokbo (1979) at IMDb
- "The Family Pedigree (Jogbo)(1978)". [KMDb Korean Movie Database].
- Hartzell, Adam. "The Genealogy (1979)". [koreanfilm.org].
