= Cho Yeon-woo =

South Korean actor (born 1971)

- Born: Cho Jong-wook; May 30, 1971 (age 55); South Korea
- Occupation: Actor
- Years active: 2003–present
- Agent: JIStory Entertainment
- Spouse: Cha Se-won (m. 2009)

Korean name
- Hangul: 조종욱
- RR: Jo Jonguk
- MR: Cho Chonguk

Stage name
- Hangul: 조연우
- Hanja: 趙軟祐
- RR: Jo Yeonu
- MR: Cho Yŏnu

Cho Yeon-woo (Korean: 조연우; born May 30, 1971), birth name Cho Jong-wook, is a South Korean actor. Cho made his acting debut in 2003, and his notable television dramas include Dear Heaven (2005), The Invisible Man (2006), What's Up Fox (2006), Moon Hee (2007), The Scarlet Letter (2010), and Can Love Become Money? (2012).

== Filmography ==
=== Television series ===
Year	Title	Role
2003	All In	Yakuza
2003	Not Divorced	Lee Jae-young
2005	Bad Housewife	Ji Sun-woo
2005	Dear Heaven	Kim Cheong-ha
2006	The 101st Proposal	Man on blind date (cameo)
2006	The Invisible Man	Ha Joon-ho
2006	What's Up Fox	Bae Hee-myung
2007	Moon Hee	Yoo Jin
2007	Lee San, Wind of the Palace	Jeong Hu-gyeom
2009	What's for Dinner?	Yoo Joon-hee
2010	KBS Drama Special – "Hot Coffee"	Choi Chang
2010	The Scarlet Letter	Lee Dong-joo
2011	Bravo, My Love!	Director Park (cameo)
2011	Dangerous Woman	Kang Dong-joon
2011	KBS Drama Special – "The Sound of My Wife Breathing"	Lee Joon-hee
2011	Happy And	Sung-wook (episode 3)
2011	Queen of Coffee	
2012	Kimchi Family	Choi Yong-bin
2012	Can Love Become Money?	Kim Sun-woo
2012	Can't Live Without You	Kim Sang-do
2012	My Kids Give Me a Headache	Oh Hyun-soo (cameo)
2013	The Suspicious Housekeeper	Manager Choi
2013	A Little Love Never Hurts	Jang Yoon-chul
2013	KBS Drama Special – "Chagall's Birthday"	Kim Tae-soo
2014	Hi! School: Love On	Hwang Woo-jin
2015	Enchanting Neighbor	Choi Dae-kyung
2015	Glamorous Temptation	
2016	I'm Sorry, But I Love You	Gong Chun-soo

=== Film ===
Year	Title	Role
2006	Old Miss Diary the Movie	PD Park

=== Variety show ===
Year	Title	Notes
2010	Lucky Strike 300	Host
2010	Behind – Season 2	Host
2011	Lee Seung-yeon and 100 Women	
2011	KOICA's Morning, Senegal episode	
2013	Honey	
2013–2014	Real Experience! Embrace the World	

== Awards and nominations ==
Year	Award	Category	Nominated work	Result
2005	SBS Drama Awards	New Star Award	Dear Heaven, Bad Housewife	Won
2012	MBC Drama Awards	Excellence Award, Actor in a Serial Drama	Can't Live Without You, Dangerous Woman	Nominated
