= My Lawyer, Mr. Jo 2: Crime and Punishment =

2019 South Korean television series

- Promotional poster
- Also known as: My Lawyer, Mr. Jo 2
- Hangul: 동네변호사 조들호 2: 죄와 벌
- Hanja: 洞네辯護士 조들호 2: 罪와罰
- Lit.: Neighborhood Lawyer Jo Deul-ho 2: Crime and Punishment
- RR: Dongne byeonhosa Jo Deulho 2: joewa beol
- MR: Tongne pyŏnhosa Cho Tŭrho 2: choewa pŏl
- Genre: Legal drama
- Based on: Neighborhood Lawyer Jo Deul-ho by Hatzling (Kim Yang-soo)
- Written by: Choi Wan-gyu
- Directed by: Han Sang-woo
- Starring: Park Shin-yang; Go Hyun-jung
- Composers: Kenzie & Yi Na-il
- Country of origin: South Korea
- Original language: Korean
- No. of episodes: 40 (Note: In order to circumvent Korean laws that prevent commercial breaks in the middle of an episode, what would previously have been aired as single 70 minute episodes are now being repackaged as two 35 minute episodes, with two episodes being shown each night with a commercial break between the two.)

Production
- Executive producer: Bae Kyeung Soo
- Producers: Kim Hyung-seok; Nam Jong Kyung
- Camera setup: Single-camera
- Running time: 35 minutes
- Production companies: NK Mulsan Co. Ltd.; Studio Invictus; UFO Production

Original release
- Network: KBS2
- Release: January 7 – March 26, 2019

My Lawyer, Mr. Jo 2: Crime and Punishment (Korean: 동네변호사 조들호 2: 죄와 벌) is a 2019 South Korean television series starring Park Shin-yang and Go Hyun-jung. It is the sequel to the 2016 television series My Lawyer, Mr. Jo. It is based on the webcomic series Neighborhood Lawyer Jo Deul-ho by Hatzling (Kim Yang-soo). It aired from January 7 to March 26, 2019 on KBS2's Mondays and Tuesdays at 22:00 KST.

== Synopsis ==
The sequel fast forward to 2019, returning with Jo Deul-ho, a once prosecutor turned lawyer, who is currently unemployed.

After a legal battle, his license is revoked for a short time, while his ex-wife and daughter leaves overseas. Being devastated with loss of his family and career, he leaves the industry for some peace of mind. Unbeknownst to him, troubles continue to follow him.

== Cast ==
=== Main ===
- Park Shin-yang as Jo Deul-ho
- Go Hyun-jung as Lee Ja-kyung

=== Supporting ===
- Lee Min-ji as Yoon So-mi
- Joo Jin-mo as Yoon Jeong-geon
- Seo Yi-sook as Shin Mi-sook
- Jeon Bae-soo as Kang Ki-young
- Byun Hee-bong as Kook Hyun-il
- Son Byong-ho as Baek Do-hyun
- Kim Bup-rae as Yoo Chang-ho
- Jung Hee-tae as Park Woo-sung
- Choi Seung-kyung as Kang Man-soo
- Jo Dal-hwan as An Dong-chool
- Lee Mi-do as Oh Jung-ja
- Yoon Joo-man as Choi Hyung-tak
- Kwon Hyuk as Kook Jong-seob
- Jang Ha-ran as Kook Jong-hee
- Jung Joon-won as Kook Jong-bok
- Hong Kyung as Baek Seung-hoon
- Moon Soo-bin as Han Min

== Production ==
Kim Sae-ron was offered the role of Yoon So-mi.

== Original soundtrack ==
My Lawyer, Mr. Jo 2: Crime and Punishment OST

Soundtrack album by Various artists
- Recorded: 2018
- Genre: Soundtrack
- Languages: Korean; English
- Labels: MUSIC&NEW, Leon Korea

=== Part 1 ===
Released on January 7, 2019
No.	Title	Lyrics	Music	Artist	Length
1.	"Stay"	Sync Project; Lee Ji-eun	ZigZag Note	Hyolyn	3:48
2.	"Stay" (Inst.)		ZigZag Note		3:48
Total length:					7:36

=== Part 2 ===
Released on January 14, 2019
No.	Title	Lyrics	Music	Artist	Length
1.	"OFF ROAD"	Jung Young-ah	Lee Bang Won Division	JK Kim Dong-wook	3:20
2.	"OFF ROAD" (Inst.)		Lee Bang Won Division		3:20
Total length:					6:40

=== Part 3 ===
Released on January 21, 2019
No.	Title	Lyrics	Music	Artist	Length
1.	"My Side" (내 편)	GamDongis, ROZ, Ki Hyun-seok	GamDongis, ROZ, Ki Hyun-seok	LOANN	3:10
2.	"My Side" (Inst.)		GamDongis, ROZ, Ki Hyun-seok		3:10
Total length:					6:20

=== Part 4 ===
Released on February 11, 2019
No.	Title	Lyrics	Music	Artist	Length
1.	"You And..." (너와…)	Park Bo-jeong	Park Bo-jeong, Kim Sung-min, Kim Shi-won (Chansline)	Minchae	3:48
2.	"You And..." (Inst.)		Park Bo-jeong, Kim Sung-min, Kim Shi-won (Chansline)		3:48
Total length:					7:36

=== Part 5 ===
Released on February 18, 2019
No.	Title	Lyrics	Music	Artist	Length
1.	"Lost Star"	Lee Soo-ji	Lee Soo-ji, Kim Kyung-min	IRO	3:37
2.	"Lost Star" (Inst.)		Lee Soo-ji, Kim Kyung-min		3:37
Total length:					7:14

=== Part 6 ===
Released on February 25, 2019
No.	Title	Lyrics	Music	Artist	Length
1.	"Hear You" (들려)	Kenzie, Lee Na-il	Kenzie, Lee Na-il	Jeonghan	3:22
2.	"Hear You" (Inst.)		Kenzie, Lee Na-il		3:22
Total length:					6:44

=== Part 7 ===
Released in March 25, 2019
No.	Title	Lyrics	Music	Artist	Length
1.	"Thank U"	mOnSteR nO.9, Kim Bo-sun, Ahn Ji-hoon	mOnSteR nO.9, Kim Bo-sun, Ahn Ji-hoon	Honeyst	3:30
2.	"Thank U" (Inst.)		mOnSteR nO.9, Kim Bo-sun, Ahn Ji-hoon		3:30
Total length:					7:00

=== Part 8 ===
Released on March 11, 2019
No.	Title	Lyrics	Music	Artist	Length
1.	"Can't Stop Thinkin' About You"	Park Yong-hyun, Wally	Park Yong-hyun, Wally	Ants	3:14
2.	"Hear You" (Inst.)		Park Yong-hyun, Wally		3:14
Total length:					6:28

== Ratings ==
- In this table, the blue numbers represent the lowest ratings and the red numbers represent the highest ratings.
- NR denotes that the drama did not rank in the top 20 daily programs on that date.
- N/A denotes that the rating is not known.

Ep.	Original broadcast date	Average audience share (Nationwide)	
Ep.	Original broadcast date	TNmS	AGB Nielsen
1	January 7, 2019	6.7%	6.1% (18th)
2	January 7, 2019	6.3%	6.7% (15th)
3	January 8, 2019	5.1%	5.9% (NR)
4	January 8, 2019	5.0%	6.8% (14th)
5	January 14, 2019	4.7%	4.8% (NR)
6	January 14, 2019	5.7%	5.5% (NR)
7	January 15, 2019	5.5%	5.8% (NR)
8	January 15, 2019	6.3%	6.6% (16th)
9	January 21, 2019	4.3%	4.7% (NR)
10	January 21, 2019	5.6%	6.3% (18th)
11	January 22, 2019	3.9%	3.8% (NR)
12	January 22, 2019	4.6%	5.0% (17th)
13	February 11, 2019	3.6%	4.4% (NR)
14	February 11, 2019	4.4%	5.7% (NR)
15	February 12, 2019	3.5%	3.8% (NR)
16	February 12, 2019	4.5%	5.0% (NR)
17	February 18, 2019	4.3%	4.9% (NR)
18	February 18, 2019	4.6%	5.5% (20th)
19	February 19, 2019	—N/a	4.5% (NR)
20	February 19, 2019	—N/a	5.7% (NR)
21	February 25, 2019	—N/a	5.0%
22	February 25, 2019	5.5%	6.5%
23	February 26, 2019	—N/a	5.4%
24	February 26, 2019	6.0%	6.3%
25	March 4, 2019	4.7%	4.3%
26	March 4, 2019	5.9%	5.9%
27	March 5, 2019	5.4%	5.8%
28	March 5, 2019	6.4%	7.0%
29	March 11, 2019	—N/a	5.2%
30	March 11, 2019	5.8%	6.9%
31	March 12, 2019	—N/a	6.3%
32	March 12, 2019	5.5%	7.3%
33	March 18, 2019	5.0%	5.0%
34	March 18, 2019	5.3%	6.0%
35	March 19, 2019	5.1%	5.1%
36	March 19, 2019	5.5%	6.0%
37	March 25, 2019	5.0%	6.7%
38	March 25, 2019	6.2%	7.8%
39	March 26, 2019	6.3%	7.9%
40	March 26, 2019	7.7%	9.3%
Average		— (Note: Due to some ratings not recorded, the exact average rating is unknown.)	—

- The drama went on hiatus (no episode was aired on January 28–29 and February 4–5) due to Park Shin-yang's surgery.

== Awards and nominations ==
Year	Award	Category	Recipient	Result	Ref.
2019	12th Korea Drama Awards	Top Excellence Award, Actor	Park Shin-yang	Nominated	
2019	KBS Drama Awards	Top Excellence Award, Actor	Park Shin-yang	Nominated	
2019	KBS Drama Awards	Top Excellence Award, Actress	Go Hyun-jung	Nominated	
2019	KBS Drama Awards	Excellence Award, Actor in a Mid-length Drama	Park Shin-yang	Nominated	
2019	KBS Drama Awards	Excellence Award, Actress in a Mid-length Drama	Go Hyun-jung	Nominated	
2019	KBS Drama Awards	Best Couple Award	Park Shin-yang and Go Hyun-jung	Nominated	
