= Kim Woo-bin =

South Korean model and actor (born 1989)

- Kim in September 2026
- Born: Kim Hyun-joong; July 16, 1989 (age 37); Seoul, South Korea
- Education: Jeonju University
- Occupations: Actor; model
- Years active: 2009–present
- Agent: AM Entertainment
- Height: 188 cm (6 ft 2 in)
- Spouse: Shin Min-a (m. 2025)

Korean name
- Hangul: 김현중
- Hanja: 金賢中
- RR: Gim Hyeonjung
- MR: Kim Hyŏnjung

Stage name
- Hangul: 김우빈
- Hanja: 金宇彬
- RR: Gim Ubin
- MR: Kim Ubin

Signature
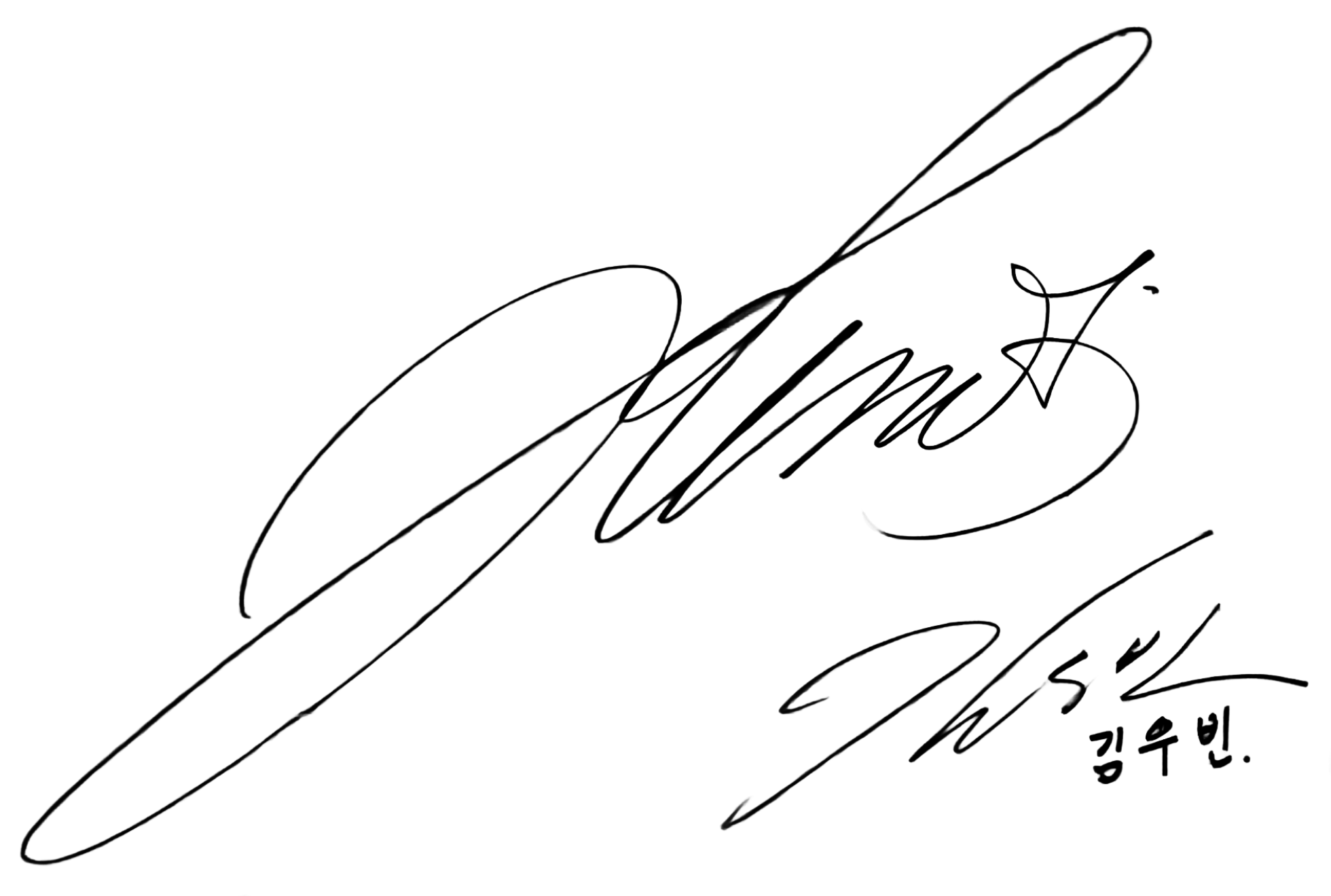

Kim Hyun-joong (Korean: 김현중; born July 16, 1989), better known by the stage name Kim Woo-bin (김우빈), is a South Korean actor and model. He began his career as a runway model and made his acting debut in the television drama White Christmas.

He subsequently gained attention in A Gentleman's Dignity (2012), and made his breakthrough with School 2013 (2012–2013) and The Heirs (2013). Kim starred in the box office hits Twenty (2015) and Master (2016). In 2016, he took on his first leading role on television in Uncontrollably Fond. In May 2017, Kim's agency announced that Kim would be taking a hiatus after he was diagnosed with nasopharyngeal cancer. Kim returned to screen in 2022 with the television series Our Blues.

== Career ==
=== 2009–2012: Beginnings ===
Kim wanted to pursue a modeling career since he was a high school student. He debuted as a runway model in 2009 at the age of 20 and began appearing in prêt-à-porter and Seoul Fashion Week collections.

As his modeling career progressed, he started doing commercial films and began studying acting, under the guidance of acting coach Moon Won-joo. Kim fell in love with acting, saying, "I found myself feeling the same thrill and enthusiasm that I felt the first time I came to walk on the runway".

Under the stage name Kim Woo-bin, he made his acting debut in 2011, starring in the mystery drama White Christmas and the low-rated cable sitcom Vampire Idol.

In 2012, he had a supporting role in the romantic comedy drama A Gentleman's Dignity, written by famed screenwriter Kim Eun-sook. Next came a two-episode guest appearance in drama adaptation of the popular manga To the Beautiful You.

=== 2013: Rising popularity ===
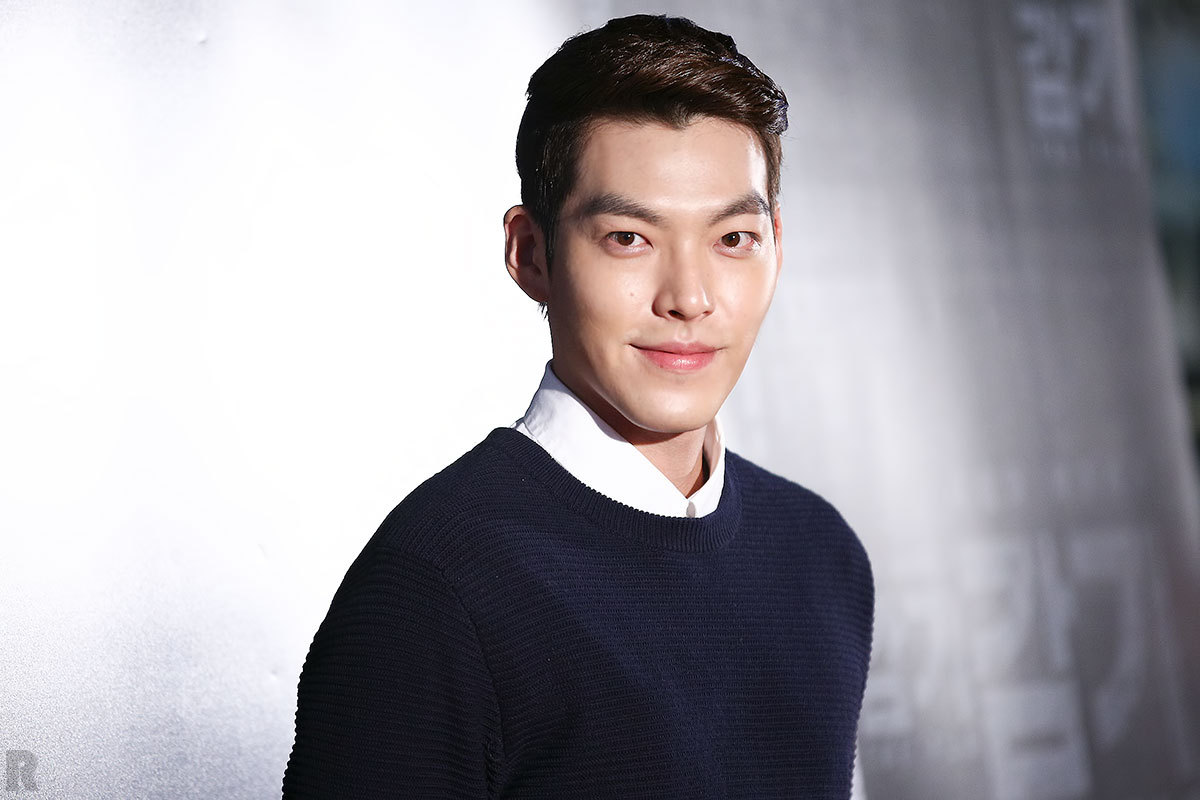
Kim at the Flu movie premiere in 2013

Kim's breakout year came in 2013 with two hit dramas and one film. From late December to early 2013, he starred in the teen drama School 2013. He received his first acting award for the role at the 2nd APAN Star Awards under the category Best New Actor.

The same year, he was cast in Kim Eun-sook's teen drama The Heirs, which became popular domestically and internationally with a peak audience rating of 28.6% and 1 million hits on the Chinese streaming website iQiyi. Kim experienced a surge in popularity overseas. This led to increased advertising contracts and acting offers for the actor.

Kim then appeared in his first major film role in Friend: The Great Legacy, the blockbuster sequel to Kwak Kyung-taek's 2001 box office hit. He received positive reviews for his portrayal as a young gang member. The same year he became the host of cable music program M! Countdown from August 15, 2013, to February 13, 2014.

=== 2014–2017: Success in film and hiatus ===
After his rise in popularity in 2013, Kim continued appearing in big screen projects. In January 2014, he was cast in the heist movie The Con Artists, in which he played a top safe-cracker alongside rising star Lee Hyun-woo. He then took on a comedic character in indie director Lee Byung-heon's sophomore effort Twenty in 2015.

Kim then appeared in an ad campaign for Calvin Klein Watches + Jewelry, making him the first East Asian model for the brand.

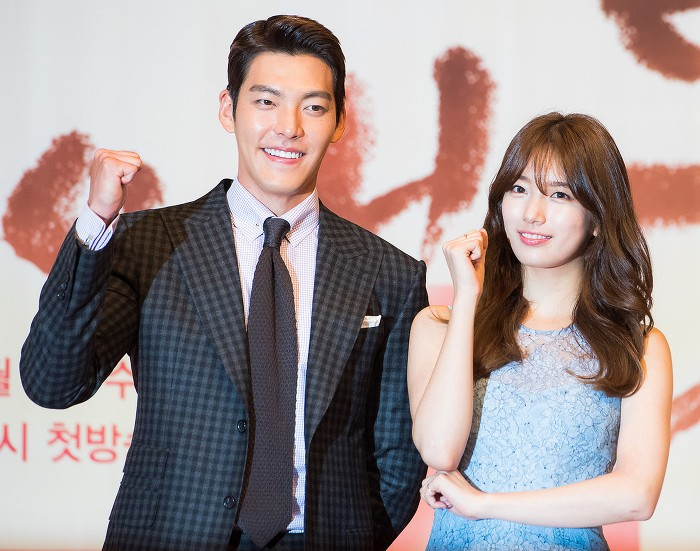
Kim and co-star Suzy at the Uncontrollably Fond press conference in 2016

In 2015, Kim was cast in his first television leading role in the melodrama Uncontrollably Fond, written by screenwriter Lee Kyung-hee. The drama premiered on July 6, 2016.

He then starred in crime action film Master alongside Lee Byung-hun and Kang Dong-won. The movie premiered in December 2016 and became the 11th bestselling film for 2016 in South Korea.

In 2017, Kim was cast in crime caper film Wiretap by Choi Dong-hoon. The project has since been suspended to allow Kim to seek treatment for cancer.

=== 2020–present: Return to screen ===
On March 11, 2020, AM Entertainment announced that Kim would be returning to the big screen in Choi Dong-hoon's upcoming sci-fi film Alienoid alongside Ryu Jun-yeol and Kim Tae-ri. The film premiered in July 2022 and Kim played the role of 'Guard', a person in charge of managing alien prisoners. Also in 2022, Kim co-starred in acclaimed screenwriter Noh Hee-kyung's television series Our Blues, and in Netflix original series Black Knight.

In 2025, Kim starred in the Netflix fantasy romantic comedy series Genie, Make a Wish written Kim Eun-sook and directed by Lee Byeong-heon. This is his second pairing with Suzy after Uncontrollably Fond in 2016. He played spirit of a lamp that awakens after a thousand years.

== Personal life ==
=== Marriage ===
Since May 2015, Kim has been in a relationship with model-actress Shin Min-a. In November 2025, Kim announced that he and Shin would be getting married in December. On December 20, their wedding took place at the Shilla Hotel in Seoul.

=== Health ===
On May 24, 2017, Kim was diagnosed with nasopharyngeal cancer. Kim's agency, Sidus HQ, said Kim had begun drug and radiation treatment and would halt all activities. On December 29, Kim announced, in a letter, that he had completed his treatment plan for the cancer. However, he was still exempted from military service.

=== Philanthropy ===
On March 8, 2022, Kim donated ₩100 million to the Hope Bridge Disaster Relief Association to help the victims of the massive wildfires that started in Uljin, Gyeongbuk and also spread to Samcheok, Gangwon. On Christmas Day, Kim sent gifts and sent a handwritten letter for about 200 children who are hospitalized in the children's ward of Seoul Asan Medical Center.

In January 2023, Kim donated ₩100 million through the Seoul Asan Medical Center to support the treatment of poor patients, with a further ₩100 million donation in January 2025. In March 2025, Kim donated ₩50 million to the Korean Red Cross to help wildfire victims in the Ulsan, Gyeongbuk, and Gyeongnam regions. In December 2025, Kim and wife Shin Min-a donated ₩300 million through various organizations including the Hallym Burn Foundation, Seoul Asan Medical Center, and Good Friends, to support people in difficult circumstances and for medical treatments of low-income families.

== Ambassadorship ==
In 2013, Kim was named honorary ambassador for his alma mater, Jeonju University. The same year, he was appointed the public relations ambassador of the 2013 Suwon Information Science Festival; and ambassador of the "Good Downloader Campaign" organized by the Korean Film Council and Film Federation Against Piracy.

In 2015, Kim was chosen as the promotional ambassador of CJ CGV's arthouse exhibition chain CGV Arthouse.

In April 2017, Kim was appointed as an honorary ambassador for the 2018 Winter Olympics in Pyeongchang, South Korea. Kim is the second actor to take on this role and was set to take part in various activities to promote the event.

== Filmography ==
Key
†	Denotes films that have not yet been released

=== Film ===
Year	Title	Role	Notes	Ref.
2012	Runway Cop		Cameo	
2013	Friend: The Great Legacy	Choi Sung-hoon		
2014	The Con Artists	Lee Ji-hyuk		
2015	Twenty	Cha Chi-ho		
2016	Master	Park Jang-goon		
2021	Like Father, Like Son	Narrator	Barrier-free version	
2022	Alienoid	Guard		
2024	Alienoid: Return to the Future	Guard		
2024	Officer Black Belt	Lee Jung-do		

=== Television series ===
Year	Title	Role	Notes	Ref.
2011	White Christmas	Kang Mi-reu		
2011	Cupid Factory	Roy	Drama Special	
2011	Vampire Idol	Woo-bin		
2012	A Gentleman's Dignity	Kim Dong-hyeob		
2012	To the Beautiful You	John Kim	Cameo (episodes 9–11)	
2012	School 2013	Park Heung-soo		
2013	The Heirs	Choi Young-do		
2016	Uncontrollably Fond	Shin Joon-young		
2022	Our Blues	Park Jeong-joon		
2023	Black Knight	5–8		
2025	Genie, Make a Wish	Genie		
2026	Gift †	Jung Min-yong	To be release on Dec 5, 2026	

=== Web series ===
Year	Title	Role	Ref.
2014	Love Cells	Love cell hunter	

=== Television shows ===
Year	Title	Role	Ref.
2023	GBRB Reap What You Sow	Cast member	
2025	GBRB Joy Pops Laugh Pops	Cast member	
2026	GBRB Farm Operation - Go Go Farm	Cast member	

=== Hosting and documentary ===
Year	Title	Ref.
2013–2014	M Countdown	
2020	Humanimal	

=== Music videos ===
Year	Title	Artist	Ref.
2009	Kiss	Dara	
2013	Don't Mess With Me	2Eyes	

== Discography ==
=== Songs ===
==== Soundtrack appearances ====
Year	Title	Peak chart positions	Album
Year	Title	KOR Gaon	Album
2016	"Picture In My Head"	91	Uncontrollably Fond OST
2016	"Do You Know"	—	Uncontrollably Fond OST
"—" denotes releases that did not chart or were not released in that region.

== Awards and nominations ==
Name of the award ceremony, year presented, category, nominee of the award, and the result of the nomination
Award ceremony	Year	Category	Nominee / Work	Result	Ref.
APAN Star Awards	2013	Best New Actor	School 2013	Won	
APAN Star Awards	2014	Excellence Award, Actor in a Miniseries	The Heirs	Nominated	
APAN Star Awards	2016	Excellence Award, Actor in a Miniseries	Uncontrollably Fond	Nominated	
APAN Star Awards	2022	Best Couple	Kim Woo-bin with Han Ji-min; Our Blues	Nominated	
Asia Model Awards	2013	New Star Award	Kim Woo-bin	Won	
Asia Model Awards	2014	Asia Star Award	Kim Woo-bin	Won	
Asia Rainbow TV Awards	2014	Best Supporting Actor	The Heirs	Nominated	
Baeksang Arts Awards	2013	Best New Actor – Television	School 2013	Nominated	
Baeksang Arts Awards	2014	Best New Actor – Film	Friend: The Great Legacy	Nominated	
Blue Dragon Film Awards	2014	Best New Actor	Friend: The Great Legacy	Nominated	
Blue Dragon Film Awards	2014	Popular Star Award	Friend: The Great Legacy	Won	
Blue Dragon Series Awards	2026	Best Actor	Genie, Make a Wish	Nominated	
Buil Film Awards	2015	Best New Actor	Twenty	Nominated	
Bucheon International Fantastic Film Festival	2014	Fantasia Award	Kim Woo-bin	Won	
China TV Drama Awards	2013	Popular Foreign Actor	The Heirs	Won	
Fashionista Awards	2015	Best Fashionista – Male Category	Kim Woo-bin	Nominated	
Fashionista Awards	2016	Best Dresser – Male	Kim Woo-bin	Nominated	
Grand Bell Awards	2014	Hana Financial Group Star Award (Popularity Award)	Friend: The Great Legacy	Won	
InStyle Star Icon	2016	Best Actor (Film)	The Con Artists, Twenty	Nominated	
InStyle Star Icon	2016	Most Stylish Male Actor	Kim Woo-bin	Nominated	
KBS Drama Awards	2016	Excellence Award, Actor in a Mid-length Drama	Uncontrollably Fond	Nominated	
KBS Drama Awards	2016	Netizen Award, Actor	Uncontrollably Fond	Nominated	
KBS Drama Awards	2016	Best Couple Award	Kim Woo-bin with Bae Suzy; Uncontrollably Fond	Nominated	
Korean Advertisers Association Awards	2016	Best Model	Kim Woo-bin	Won	
Korea Best Dresser Swan Awards	2015	Best Dresser Award	Kim Woo-bin	Won	
Korea Drama Awards	2013	Best New Actor	School 2013	Nominated	
Korea Drama Awards	2014	Excellence Award, Actor	The Heirs	Nominated	
Korean Film Actors' Guild Awards	2015	Popularity Award	Twenty	Won	
Max Movie Awards	2014	Best New Actor	Friend: The Great Legacy	Nominated	
Max Movie Awards	2015	Best Actor	The Con Artists	Nominated	
Mnet 20's Choice Awards	2013	20's Booming Star – Male	School 2013	Nominated	
SBS Drama Awards	2013	Top 10 Stars	The Heirs	Won	
Seoul International Drama Awards	2014	People's Choice Actor	The Heirs	Nominated	
Style Icon Awards	2014	Top 10 Style Icons	Kim Woo-bin	Nominated	

=== Listicles ===
Name of publisher, year listed, name of listicle, and placement
Publisher	Year	Listicle	Placement	Ref.
Forbes	2015	Korea Power Celebrity 40	29th	
the Korea Consumer Forum and the U.S. consulting firm BrandKey	2026	2026 Most Influential Male Actor	1st	
