= Han Hye-sook =

South Korean actress (born 1951)

- Born: August 20, 1951 (age 75); South Korea
- Occupation: Actress

Korean name
- Hangul: 한혜숙
- Hanja: 韓惠淑
- RR: Han Hyesuk
- MR: Han Hyesuk

Han Hye-sook (Korean: 한혜숙; born August 20, 1951) is a South Korean actress. Han won the Grand Prize in the controversial but highly rated television drama Dear Heaven at the SBS Drama Awards in 2006.

== Filmography ==
=== Film ===
Year	Title	Role
1978	The Evergreen Tree	
1978	No More Sorrow	
1979	The Genealogy	
1979	Eternal Inheritance	
1980	Mrs. Speculator	
1980	The Last Witness	
1987	The Home of Two Women	Yoo-hwa
2007	Mother	Mother
2008	Living Together, Happy Together	

=== Television series ===
Year	Title	Role
1987	Windfall	
1994	Way of Living: Woman	Bae Shin-ja
1997	Beautiful Crime	Kim Chul-soo's mother
1998	The King and the Queen	Queen Jeonghui
2001	Mina	Choon-ja
2002	Saxophone and Chapssaltteok	Yoon Yeo-ok
2002	Miss Mermaid	Shim Soo-jung
2004	Lotus Flower Fairy	Jang Shi-ae
2005	Dear Heaven	Ji Young-sun
2009	Assorted Gems	Pi Hye-ja

== Awards and nominations ==
Year	Award	Category	Nominated work	Result
1987	23rd Baeksang Arts Awards	Best Actress (TV)	Windfall	Won
2002	MBC Drama Awards	Special Acting Award	Miss Mermaid	Won
2006	SBS Drama Awards	Grand Prize (Daesang)	Dear Heaven	Won
2006	SBS Drama Awards	Top 10 Stars	Dear Heaven	Won
