= My Lawyer, Mr. Jo =

2016 South Korean TV series

- Promotional poster
- Hangul: 동네변호사 조들호
- RR: Dongne byeonhosa Jo Deulho
- MR: Tongne pyŏnhosa Cho Tŭrho
- Genre: Drama; Legal; Comedy
- Based on: Neighborhood Lawyer Jo Deul-ho by Hatzling (Kim Yang-soo)
- Written by: Lee Hyang-hee
- Directed by: Lee Jeong-seob; Lee Eun-jin
- Starring: Park Shin-yang; Kang So-ra; Ryu Soo-young; Park Sol-mi
- Country of origin: South Korea
- Original language: Korean
- No. of episodes: 20

Production
- Executive producers: Jung Hae-ryong; KBS
- Producers: Jin Hyung-wook; Lee Young-bum
- Running time: 60 minutes
- Production company: S.M. Culture & Contents

Original release
- Network: KBS2
- Release: March 28 – May 31, 2016

My Lawyer, Mr. Jo (Korean: 동네변호사 조들호; lit. 'Neighborhood Lawyer Jo Deul-ho') is a 2016 South Korean television series starring Park Shin-yang, Kang So-ra, Ryu Soo-young, Park Sol-mi. Based on the same-titled webtoon, it aired on KBS2.

The second season of the drama titled My Lawyer, Mr. Jo 2: Crime and Punishment started airing on KBS2 in January 2019.

== Synopsis ==
Jo Deul-ho (Park Shin-yang) who once had a bright future ahead of him as a star prosecutor, and was the son-in-law to the head of the largest law firm in their country. But when he witnesses corruption in the prosecutor's office and reports it, he loses everything. He tries to rebuild his life and turn his small and run-down neighborhood law office into a second chance to become a lawyer who protects people and protects the law, and grows as a person in the process.

== Cast ==
=== Main cast ===
- Park Shin-yang as Jo Deul-ho
- Kang So-ra as Lee Eun-jo
- Ryu Soo-young as Shin Ji-wook
- Park Sol-mi as Jang Hae-kyung, Deul-ho's ex-wife and lawyer at Geum San
- Kim Kap-soo as Shin Young-il, father of Ji-wook

=== Geum San Law Firm ===
- Kang Shin-il as Jang Shin-woo
- Jo Han-chul as Kim Tae-jung
- Jung Won-joong as Chairman Jung

=== Deul-ho's Law Firm ===
- Hwang Seok-jeong as Hwang Ae-ra
- Park Won-sang as Bae Dae-soo
- Kim Dong-jun as Kim Yoo-shin (Ep. 1–8, 11–12)

=== Others ===
- Jung Kyu-soo as Lee Joon-kang
- Kim Ji-an as Oh Seo-yoon
- Jang So-yun as Choi Ah-rim
- Yoon Bok-in as Jung Se-mi
- Choi Jae-hwan as Kang Il-goo
- Jung Han-bi as Oh Jin-young
- Heo Jung-eun as Jo Soo-bin, Deul-ho's daughter
- Song Ji-in as Bae Hyo-jin, Dae-soo's younger sister
- Park Sang-myun as Lee Joon-kang
- Lee Yong-yi as Mal-sook

== Ratings ==
In this table, the blue numbers represent the lowest ratings and the red numbers represent the highest ratings.

Ep.	Original broadcast date	Average audience share			
Ep.	Original broadcast date	TNmS		AGB Nielsen	
Ep.	Original broadcast date	Nationwide	Seoul	Nationwide	Seoul
1	March 28, 2016	8.6% (17th)	8.5% (15th)	10.1% (13th)	11.0% (9th)
2	March 29, 2016	10.5% (10th)	10.9% (7th)	11.4% (8th)	12.5% (7th)
3	April 4, 2016	9.2% (19th)	9.6% (11th)	10.9% (8th)	11.6% (7th)
4	April 5, 2016	9.6% (10th)	10.7% (5th)	11.3% (6th)	11.6% (6th)
5	April 11, 2016	9.6% (13th)	10.2% (7th)	12.3% (6th)	13.2% (6th)
6	April 12, 2016	11.0% (7th)	10.7% (6th)	12.4% (6th)	12.7% (6th)
7	April 18, 2016	10.6% (11th)	11.7% (5th)	12.6% (5th)	14.3% (5th)
8	April 19, 2016	11.4% (6th)	12.1% (5th)	12.1% (6th)	12.8% (6th)
9	April 25, 2016	10.0% (12th)	10.6% (7th)	12.7% (7th)	13.9% (6th)
10	April 26, 2016	10.1% (10th)	11.7% (5th)	12.6% (5th)	13.5% (6th)
11	May 2, 2016	9.6% (15th)	11.1% (7th)	11.0% (5th)	11.6% (6th)
12	May 3, 2016	10.6% (10th)	11.2% (5th)	11.8% (6th)	12.8% (5th)
13	May 9, 2016	10.5% (10th)	11.9% (4th)	11.8% (6th)	12.7% (4th)
14	May 10, 2016	11.3% (8th)	12.4% (4th)	14.1% (4th)	15.5% (4th)
15	May 16, 2016	11.8% (8th)	12.5% (4th)	14.1% (4th)	15.3% (4th)
16	May 17, 2016	12.7% (4th)	13.5% (3rd)	15.3% (3rd)	16.5% (3rd)
17	May 23, 2016	11.6% (5th)	12.1% (4th)	14.0% (4th)	15.1% (4th)
18	May 24, 2016	12.5% (5th)	12.5% (4th)	15.5% (4th)	16.4% (4th)
19	May 30, 2016	13.2% (4th)	14.0% (4th)	14.2% (4th)	15.0% (4th)
20	May 31, 2016	14.1% (4th)	14.8% (4th)	17.3% (3rd)	18.6% (2nd)
Average		10.9%	11.6%	12.9%	13.8%

== Awards and nominations ==
Year	Award	Category	Recipient	Result
2016	9th Korea Drama Awards	Grand Prize (Daesang)	Park Shin-yang	Nominated
2016	30th KBS Drama Awards	Grand Prize (Daesang)	Park Shin-yang	Nominated
2016	30th KBS Drama Awards	Top Excellence Award, Actor	Park Shin-yang	Won
2016	30th KBS Drama Awards	Excellence Award, Actor in a Mid-length Drama	Park Shin-yang	Nominated
2016	30th KBS Drama Awards	Excellence Award, Actress in a Mid-length Drama	Kang So-ra	Nominated
2016	30th KBS Drama Awards	Best Supporting Actor	Kim Kap-soo	Nominated
2016	30th KBS Drama Awards	Best Supporting Actress	Hwang Seok-jeong	Nominated
2016	30th KBS Drama Awards	Best Young Actress	Heo Jung-eun	Won
