= Kang Ji-sub =

South Korean actor (born 1981)

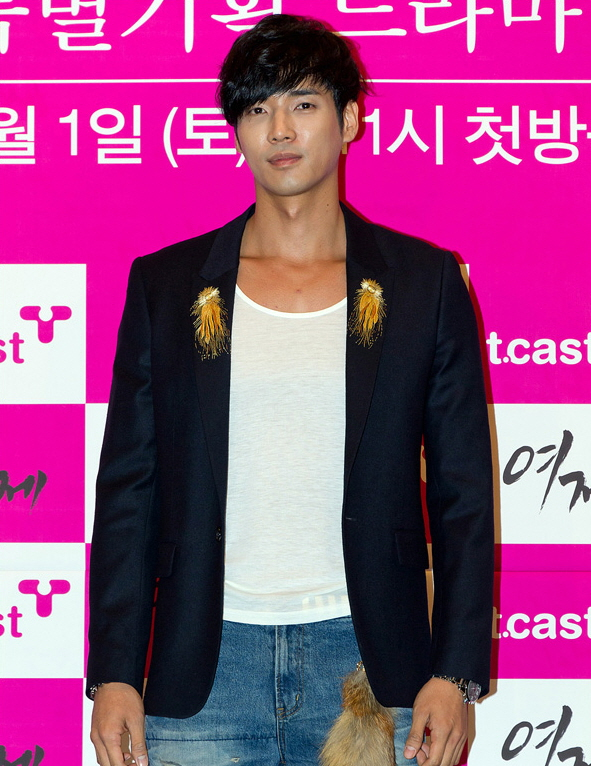
- Kang in September 2011
- Born: Kim Young-sub; February 6, 1981 (age 45); Dongsam-dong, Yeongdo District, Busan, South Korea
- Occupation: Actor
- Years active: 2005–present
- Agent: Urban Works Entertainment

Korean name
- Hangul: 김영섭
- RR: Gim Yeongseop
- MR: Kim Yŏngsŏp

Stage name
- Hangul: 강지섭
- RR: Gang Jiseop
- MR: Kang Chisŏp

Kang Ji-sub (Korean: 강지섭; born February 6, 1981), birth name Kim Young-sub, is a South Korean actor. He began acting in 2005 in Dear Heaven, and went on to star in television melodramas such as Two Wives (2009), The Empress (2011), and Two Women's Room (2013). Kang made his big-screen debut in 2014 with The Plan, a thriller about loan sharks.

== Filmography ==
=== Television series ===
Year	Title	Role	Notes/Ref.
2005	Dear Heaven	Kang Yi-ri	
2006	Common Single	Kang Woo-hyuk	
2007	Salt Doll	Min Hyun-soo	
2007	A Happy Woman	Jang Byung-gyu	
2008	Women in the Sun	Hong Eun-sub	
2009	Two Wives	Song Ji-ho	
2010	Happiness in the Wind	Kang Sang-jun	
2011	The Duo	Jin-deuk	
2011	The Empress	Jung Hyuk	
2011	Bolder By the Day	Kang In-han	
2012	Man from the Equator	Choi Yoon-suk	
2013	Two Women's Room	Han Ji-sub	
2014	Wife Scandal – "The Wind Rises"	Photographer the wife's lover	episode: "Lie"
2014	12 Years Promise	Jang-woo	cameo
2015	A Bird That Doesn't Sing	Park Sung-soo	
2016	Shopping King Louie	Nam Joo-hyuk	
2017	Bravo My Life	Seol Do-hyun	
2022	The King of Tears, Lee Bang-won	Hwang Hui	
2022–2023	Vengeance of the Bride	Kang Tae-poong	

=== Film ===
Year	Title	Role
2014	The Plan	Yong-hoon
2017	Marionette	Woo-hyuk

=== Variety shows ===
Year	Title	Notes/Ref.
2014	Law of the Jungle in the Indian Ocean	Cast member
2016	King of Mask Singer	Contestant as "Mr. Kim An Artist", episode 61

== Awards and nominations ==
Year	Award	Category	Nominated work	Result
2006	SBS Drama Awards	New Star Award	Common Single	Won
2008	KBS Drama Awards	Best Supporting Actor	Women in the Sun	Nominated
2009	SBS Drama Awards	Best Supporting Actor in a Serial Drama	Two Wives	Nominated
2013	SBS Drama Awards	Excellence Award, Actor in a Weekend/Daily Drama	Two Women's Room	Nominated
2022	KBS Drama Awards	Excellence Award, Actor in a Daily Drama	Vengeance of the Bride	Nominated
