= Three Bold Siblings =

2022 South Korean television series

- Promotional poster
- Hangul: 삼남매가 용감하게
- Lit.: Three Siblings Bravely
- RR: Samnammaega yonggamhage
- MR: Samnammaega yonggamhage
- Genre: Family drama
- Developed by: KBS Drama Division (Planning)
- Written by: Kim In-young
- Directed by: Park Man-young
- Starring: Lee Ha-na; Lim Ju-hwan; Lee Tae-sung; Kim Seung-soo; Kim So-eun; Lee You-jin
- Music by: Choi In-hee
- Country of origin: South Korea
- Original language: Korean
- No. of episodes: 51

Production
- Executive producer: Hong Seok-gu (KBS)
- Producers: Oh Sung-min; Kwak Hong-seok
- Running time: 80 minutes
- Production company: GnG Production

Original release
- Network: KBS2
- Release: September 24, 2022 – March 19, 2023

Three Bold Siblings (Korean: 삼남매가 용감하게) is a 2023 South Korean television series starring Lee Ha-na, Lim Ju-hwan, Lee Tae-sung, Kim Seung-soo, Kim So-eun and Lee You-jin. It premiered on KBS2 on September 24, 2022, and aired every Saturday and Sunday at 20:00 (KST).

== Synopsis ==
A story about K-first daughter Kim Tae-joo (Lee Ha-na) and top star K-first son Lee Sang-joon (Lim Ju-hwan) seeking happiness.

== Cast ==
=== Main ===
- Lee Ha-na as Kim Tae-joo

She is pleasant and lenient, however she likewise has a hot attitude. She removes associations with individuals whom she could do without.
- Ki So-yu as young Kim Tae-joo.

- Lim Ju-hwan as Lee Sang-joon
  - Go Kyung-min as young Lee Sang-joon

He is a famous entertainer. He is delicate, innovative, and savvy. He is likewise the oldest kin in his loved ones. Since he was a youngster, he has been cherished by his family profoundly. His family was once in the red, yet, after Lee Sang-joon became effective, he took care of their obligation and keeps on supporting them monetarily. During shooting for an acting task, Lee Sang-joon gets harmed and goes to the emergency clinic.

- Lee Tae-sung as Cha Yun-ho

A documentary director called 'Wild Horse'. He has a cool personality, blunt, brave, and has no intention of getting married. He was a man who experienced a change in the values of marriage through many meetings with the person.

- Kim Seung-soo as Shin Mu-young

Director of a small and medium-sized company. Mo-young graduated with a master's degree in Chemistry. He is a kind person and does not get angry, has a logical approach to dealing with problems.

- Kim So-eun as Kim So-rim

The middle child of the Kim family and Kim Tae-joo's younger sister. A friendly and sociable person who gets along well with her sister. Kim So-rim is a beautiful pilates instructor whose sunny personality attracts others.

- Lee You-jin as Kim Gun-woo

The youngest son and a doctor at the general hospital. However, when he gets caught up in an unexpected love affair in his life, he gets into a mess.

=== Supporting ===
==== People around the three siblings ====
- Jung Jae-soon as Choi Mal-soon

The grandmother of three siblings, has a clean and strict personality. She doesn't like Tae Joo.

- Lee Kyung-jin as Yoo Jung-suk

Mother of three siblings and a strong and honest person. But feel sadness for Tae Joo.

- Song Seung-hwan as Kim Hae-bok

Chef of 'Today's Curry' and father of Gun-Woo & So-Rim & Stepfather of Tae-Joo, has a warm and loving personality.

==== People around Lee Sang-joon ====
- Kim Yong-rim as Yoon Gap-bun

Lee Sang-joon and Lee Sang-min's grandmother, Jang Se-ran's mother.

- Chang Mi-hee as Jang Se-ran

Lee Sang-joon and Lee Sang-min's mother. She is not only beautiful and sophisticated but also smart-headed with artistic flair and business acumen, never give up.

- Wang Bit-na as Jang Hyun-jung

University professor, columnist, fashion content creator and bright and groundbreaking who are often indifferent, but shows a desire to win when she is obsessed with it.

- Moon Ye-won as Lee Sang-min

Lee Sang-joon's younger sister.

- Min Sung-wook as Jang Young-sik

Cousin of Lee Sang-joon's mother. Son of brother of Yoon Gap-bun.

- Jung Soo-young as Na Eun-joo

She is the cousin of eldest son Lee Sang-joon and is a hard worker who runs a photo studio with her husband and oversees management, public relations, renting clothes and even cleaning.

- Ryu Ui-hyun as Jang Soo-bin

Bright personality and optimistic simplicity that makes life enjoyable. He is a source of energy. He is cousin of Lee Sang-joon & Lee Sung Min.

- Jung Woo-jin as Jang Ji-woo

Jang Young-sik's second son & brother of Soo-Bin. He is the fifth cousin of Lee Sang-joon & Lee Sung Min.

==== Others ====
- Kim Ji-an as Shin Ji-hye

The daughter of a wealthy family who is emotionally honest and doesn't know the world.

- Yang Dae-hyuk as Jo Nam-soo

Employee who tend to work in large companies. Boyfriend of So-Rim who is cheating her.

- Oh Ha-nee as Min Yu-ri

The only daughter of a wealthy family full of cuteness. Girlfriend of Gun-Woo who is cheating him.

- Jang Hee-jung as Hoo Yong-sil

Former nurse Kim Tae-joo's medical school classmate and best friend.

=== Extended ===
- Jeon No-min as Kim Myung-jae

Kim Tae-joo's uncle.

- Go On as Bae Dong-chan

Lee Sang-min's boyfriend, an actor who pretends to be a prosecutor to marry Lee Sang-min. He cheats on Sang-Min on their wedding day.

- Han Ji-wan as The person who threw an egg at Tae-joo

She used to bully Tae-joo.

- Lee Se-young as Streamer

A suspicious TV streamer that Tae-joo saw.

- Cha Ji-hoon as Hong Seok

The actor cast in the drama 'Black & White'.

- Lee Ki-taek as Won Ji-hoon

He is the best friend of Cha Yun-ho and works with him.

- Lee Seung-hyung as Wang Seung-goo

Sang-joon's manager.

- Jung Gun-joo as Actor

Drama actor Sang-joon is playing.

- Park Hee-soo as Jang Jae-won

Jang Se-ran's Korean-American grandson.

- Ahn Ji-hye as Lee Jang-mi
- Kim Kyung-hwa as Oh Hee-eun

The ex-wife of Shin Mu-young.

- Kim Seon-hwa as Young-shik's mother

== Production ==
The series, written by Kim In-young, is planned by KBS Drama Division and produced by GnG Productions. The first script reading of the cast was held in August 2022.

== Viewership ==
Three Bold Siblings : South Korea viewers per episode (millions)

Episodes	Episode number										
Episodes	1	2	3	4	5	6	7	8	9	10	11
Ep. 1–10	3.528	3.919	3.331	3.493	2.908	3.275	3.114	3.390	3.246	3.581	–
Ep. 11–20	2.792	3.372	3.314	3.888	3.427	3.788	3.210	3.752	3.238	3.336	–
Ep. 21–30	3.319	4.019	3.558	4.083	3.629	3.982	3.532	4.221	4.203	3.675	–
Ep. 31–40	4.440	3.951	4.284	3.342	3.684	4.088	4.821	4.470	4.870	4.102	–
Ep. 41–50	4.836	4.090	4.905	4.462	5.067	4.384	5.144	4.422	5.130	4.301	5.016

Source: Audience measurement performed nationwide by Nielsen Korea.

Ep.	Original broadcast date	Average audience share		
Ep.	Original broadcast date	Nielsen Korea		TNmS
Ep.	Original broadcast date	Nationwide	Seoul	Nationwide
1	September 24, 2022	20.5% (1st)	18.4% (1st)	17.6% (1st)
2	September 25, 2022	22.1% (1st)	19.8% (1st)	19.2% (1st)
3	October 1, 2022	18.5% (1st)	17.0% (1st)	15.6% (1st)
4	October 2, 2022	19.6% (1st)	17.8% (1st)	18.0% (1st)
5	October 8, 2022	16.9% (1st)	15.3% (1st)	14.6% (1st)
6	October 9, 2022	19.2% (1st)	18.2% (1st)	16.3% (1st)
7	October 15, 2022	18.5% (1st)	16.1% (1st)	14.6% (1st)
8	October 16, 2022	20.1% (1st)	18.6% (1st)	16.7% (1st)
9	October 22, 2022	18.3% (1st)	16.8% (1st)	14.7% (1st)
10	October 23, 2022	20.9% (1st)	19.5% (1st)	16.9% (1st)
11	October 29, 2022	16.7% (1st)	14.8% (1st)	14.6% (1st)
12	October 30, 2022	18.8% (1st)	16.6% (1st)	15.0% (1st)
13	November 5, 2022	18.7% (1st)	16.3% (1st)	15.6% (1st)
14	November 6, 2022	22.2% (1st)	19.9% (1st)	17.7% (1st)
15	November 12, 2022	19.4% (1st)	17.4% (1st)	16.3% (1st)
16	November 13, 2022	20.8% (1st)	18.9% (1st)	17.7% (1st)
17	November 19, 2022	18.9% (1st)	17.1% (1st)	15.2% (1st)
18	November 20, 2022	21.0% (1st)	19.2% (1st)	17.6% (1st)
19	November 26, 2022	18.5% (1st)	17.0% (1st)	15.3% (1st)
20	November 27, 2022	18.6% (1st)	16.9% (1st)	16.0% (1st)
21	December 3, 2022	19.0% (1st)	17.1% (2nd)	16.7% (1st)
22	December 4, 2022	22.8% (1st)	21.0% (1st)	18.8% (1st)
23	December 10, 2022	20.1% (1st)	17.8% (1st)	16.2% (1st)
24	December 11, 2022	22.5% (1st)	20.5% (1st)	18.4% (1st)
25	December 17, 2022	21.2% (1st)	18.8% (1st)	16.1% (1st)
26	December 18, 2022	22.5% (1st)	20.0% (1st)	18.4% (1st)
27	December 24, 2022	19.4% (1st)	18.0% (1st)	N/A
28	December 25, 2022	23.5% (1st)	21.9% (1st)	19.9% (1st)
29	January 1, 2023	22.8% (1st)	21.3% (1st)	N/A
30	January 7, 2023	21.4% (1st)	20.4% (1st)	16.9% (1st)
31	January 8, 2023	24.4% (1st)	23.0% (1st)	19.7% (1st)
32	January 14, 2023	21.9% (1st)	20.0% (1st)	N/A
33	January 15, 2023	25.0% (1st)	23.5% (1st)	20.2% (1st)
34	January 21, 2023	18.4% (1st)	16.9% (1st)	16.2% (1st)
35	January 22, 2023	19.6% (1st)	17.8% (1st)	17.1% (1st)
36	January 28, 2023	23.1% (1st)	21.6% (1st)	19.2% (1st)
37	January 29, 2023	26.3% (1st)	25.2% (1st)	21.2% (1st)
38	February 4, 2023	24.1% (1st)	21.8% (1st)	19.2% (1st)
39	February 5, 2023	26.7% (1st)	25.0% (1st)	21.9% (1st)
40	February 11, 2023	23.3% (1st)	21.7% (1st)	20.1% (1st)
41	February 12, 2023	26.8% (1st)	25.4% (1st)	21.2% (1st)
42	February 18, 2023	23.4% (1st)	21.7% (1st)	N/A
43	February 19, 2023	27.2% (1st)	25.6% (1st)	21.8% (1st)
44	February 25, 2023	25.2% (1st)	23.3% (1st)	19.0% (1st)
45	February 26, 2023	27.6% (1st)	25.8% (1st)	21.3% (1st)
46	March 4, 2023	24.9% (1st)	22.8% (1st)	19.4% (1st)
47	March 5, 2023	28.0% (1st)	25.4% (1st)	22.2% (1st)
48	March 11, 2023	24.3% (1st)	22.2% (1st)	18.7% (1st)
49	March 12, 2023	27.2% (1st)	24.3% (1st)	22.3% (1st)
50	March 18, 2023	24.8% (1st)	22.8% (1st)	N/A
51	March 19, 2023	27.5% (1st)	25.3% (1st)	22.6% (1st)
Average		22.0%	20.2%	— (Note: Due to some ratings not recorded, the exact average rating is unknown.)
In the table above, the blue numbers represent the lowest ratings and the red numbers represent the highest ratings.; N/A denotes that the rating is not known.

== Awards and nominations ==
Year	Award	Category	Recipient	Result
2022	KBS Drama Awards	Excellence Award, Actress in a Serial Drama	Lee Ha-na	Won
2022	KBS Drama Awards	Excellence Award, Actress in a Serial Drama	Kim So-eun	Nominated
2022	KBS Drama Awards	Excellence Award, Actor in a Serial Drama	Lim Ju-hwan	Won
2022	KBS Drama Awards	Excellence Award, Actor in a Serial Drama	Kim Seung-soo	Nominated
2022	KBS Drama Awards	Best Supporting Actor	Song Seung-hwan	Nominated
2022	KBS Drama Awards	Best New Actor	Lee You-jin	Won
2022	KBS Drama Awards	Best Young Actress	Ki So-yu	Nominated
2022	KBS Drama Awards	Popularity Award, Actress	Lee Ha-na	Nominated
2022	KBS Drama Awards	Popularity Award, Actor	Lim Ju-hwan	Nominated
2022	KBS Drama Awards	Best Couple Award	Kim Seung-soo and Kim So-eun	Won
2023	Seoul International Drama Awards	Outstanding Korean Drama OST	Kim Ho-joong (Meet You Among Them)	Won
2023	9th APAN Star Awards	Top Excellence Award, Actress in a Serial Drama	Lee Ha-na	Nominated
2023	9th APAN Star Awards	Excellence Award, Actress in a Serial Drama	Kim So-eun	Nominated
