= Kim Ji-an =

South Korean actress (born 1992)

- Born: 5 February 1992 (age 34); Seoul, South Korea
- Other name: Kim Ji-ahn
- Education: Sungshin Women's University (Bachelor of Media and Visual Acting)
- Occupation: Actress
- Years active: 2014–present
- Agent: ADIA Entertainment
- Known for: My Lawyer, Mr. Jo; One More Happy Ending; Three Bold Siblings

Korean name
- Hangul: 김지안
- RR: Gim Jian
- MR: Kim Chian

Kim Ji-an (Korean: 김지안; born 5 February 1992) is a South Korean actress. She is known for her roles in drama such as My Lawyer, Mr. Jo, Moonshine, One More Happy Ending and Three Bold Siblings. She also appeared in movies The Co Artists, The Artist: Reborn, Luck Key and Will This Love Be Reached?.

== Filmography ==
=== Television series ===
| Year | Title | Role | Ref. |
|---|---|---|---|
| 2016 | My Lawyer, Mr. Jo | Oh Seo-yoon | |
| 2016 | One More Happy Ending | Goo Yeon-mi | |
| 2021 | Moonshine | Ok-ran | |
| 2022 | Three Bold Siblings | Shin Ji-hye | |
| 2023 | True to Love | Lim Yu-ri | |

=== Web series ===
| Year | Title | Role | Ref. |
|---|---|---|---|
| 2015 | Romance Blue | Kim Ji-an | |
| 2016 | Nightmare Teacher | Do Do-hee | |
| 2016 | Tong: Memories | Oh Yoon-joo | |

=== Film ===
| Year | Title | Role | Ref. |
|---|---|---|---|
| 2014 | The Co Artists | Skyscraper Guard | |
| 2016 | Detour | Sun-mi | |
| 2016 | Luck Key | Kang Yoo-na | |
| 2017 | The Artist: Reborn | Da-hee | |
| 2017 | Will This Love Be Reached? | Kim Ji-an | |
