= Wang Bit-na =

South Korean actress (born 1981)

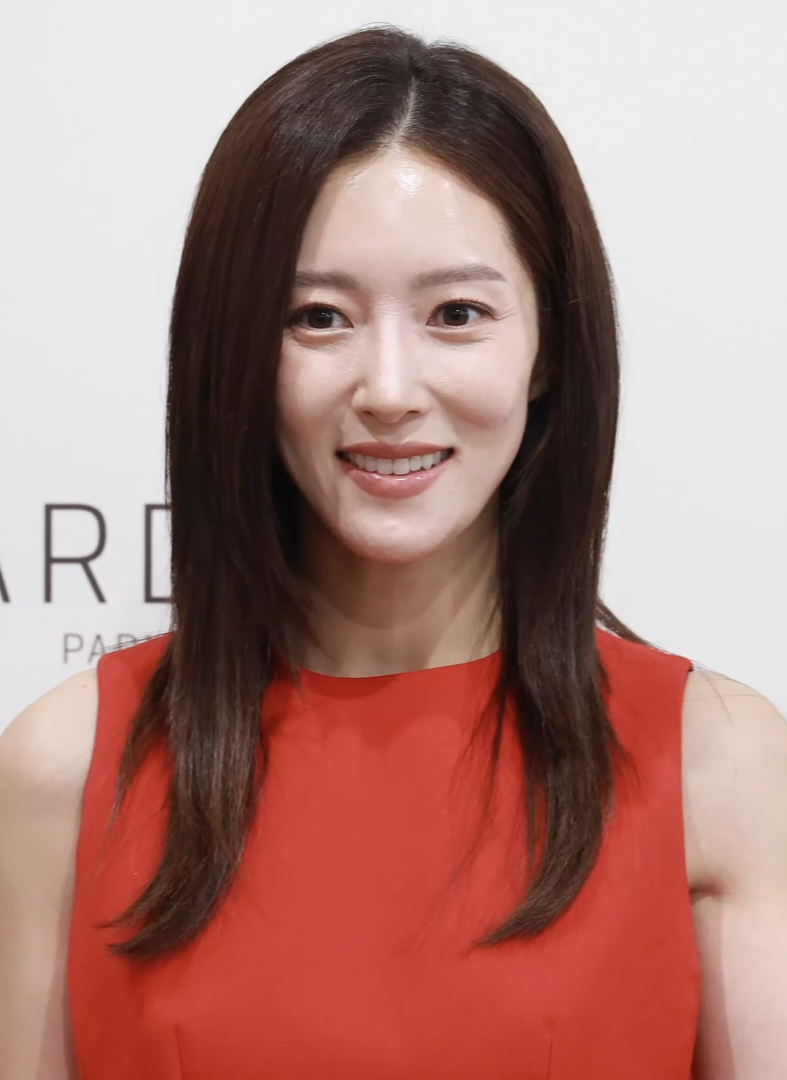
- Wang in July 2024
- Born: April 15, 1981 (age 45); South Korea
- Education: Chung-Ang University – Theater and Film
- Occupation: Actress
- Agent: ELRIS
- Spouse: Jung Seung-woo (m. 2007; div. 2018)
- Children: 2

Korean name
- Hangul: 왕빛나
- RR: Wang Bitna
- MR: Wang Pinna

Wang Bit-na (Korean: 왕빛나; born April 15, 1981) is a South Korean actress. She is best known for playing Bu-yong in the popular historical drama Hwang Jini.

== Filmography ==
=== Film ===
Year	Title	Role
2002	2424	Publicity girl 1
2002	Run to You	Jung Ah
2003	Romantic Assassins	Pung (Ghost)
2005	Cello	Kyung Ran
2015	Love Copyright	So Yun

=== Television series ===
Year	Title	Role	Notes/Ref.
2003	Snowman	Lee Soo-jin	
2003	She is Cool	Hwang Mi-na	
2004	Little Women	Min Kyung	
2005	Love and Sympathy	Na Ri	
2005	Dear Heaven	Kang Ye-ri	
2006	My Lovely Fool	Jung Seung-hye	
2006	Hwang Jini	Bu-yong	
2007	Merry Mary	Lee So-ra	
2007	Sky High	Lee Jin-hee	
2008	Chunja's Special Day	Lee Joo-ri	
2010	The Woman Who Still Wants to Marry	Kim Bu-ki	
2010	Kim Su-ro, The Iron King	Ah-Ro	
2011	I Trusted Him	Oh Kyung-joo	
2011	Midnight Hospital	Han Jae-hee	
2012	Can Love Become Money?	Hong Mi Mi	
2012	Still You	Kang Chae-rin	
2012	The Sons	Se Ra	Cameo
2012	Ohlala Couple	Jin-sook	Cameo
2013	Ugly Alert		Cameo
2013	Two Women's Room	Eun Hee-soo	
2014	Cunning Single Lady		Cameo
2014	Wife Scandal: "The Wind Rises"	the wife	
2016	Five Enough	Kang So-young	
2016	Sweet Stranger and Me	Yoo Shi-eun	
2016	First Love Again	Baek Min-hui	
2018	Mysterious Personal Shopper	Eun Kyung-hye	
2019	Love in Sadness	Joo Hae-ra	
2020	Kingmaker: The Change of Destiny	Ban-Dal	
2021	She Would Never Know	Chae Ji-seung	
2021	River Where the Moon Rises	Queen Jin	
2021–2022	Young Lady and Gentleman	Jang Gook-hee	
2022	JTBC Drama Festa: "The Woman Who Lives in Misfortune"	Cha Seon-joo	One act-drama
2022–2023	Three Bold Siblings	Jang Hyeon-jeong	
2023	Kokdu: Season of Deity	Han Gye-jeol's mother	Cameo (episode 3–4)

== Awards ==
- 2018 Korea Drama Awards: Top Excellence Award, Actress (Mysterious Personal Shopper)
- 2013 SBS Drama Awards: Excellence Award, Actress in a Weekend/Daily Drama (Two Women's Room)
- 2007 SBS Drama Awards: New Star Award
- 2006 KBS Drama Awards: Best Supporting Actress (Hwang Jini)
