= Two Women's Room =

- Promotional poster
- Also known as: Room for Two
- Genre: Melodrama; Revenge; Family
- Written by: Seol Kyung-eun
- Directed by: Lee Myung-woo
- Starring: Park Eun-hye; Wang Bit-na; Kang Ji-sub; Kang Kyung-joon
- Music by: Kang Dong-yoon
- Country of origin: South Korea
- Original language: Korean
- No. of episodes: 119

Production
- Executive producer: Han Jung-hwan
- Producer: Song Min-seok
- Production location: Korea
- Cinematography: Yoon Dae-young
- Editor: Nam Ah-young
- Running time: approx. 30-35 minutes Mondays to Fridays at 08:30 (KST)
- Production company: Seoul Broadcasting System

Original release
- Network: SBS TV
- Release: August 5, 2013 – January 17, 2014

Two Women's Room (Korean: 두 여자의 방; RR: Du yeojaui bang) is a 2013 South Korean television melodrama starring Park Eun-hye, Wang Bit-na, Kang Ji-sub, and Kang Kyung-joon. It aired on SBS from August 5, 2013 to January 17, 2014 on Mondays to Fridays at 8:30 a.m. for 119 episodes.

== Plot ==
Min Kyung-chae is the Vice President of the luxurious Mona Lisa Hotel. One night, while driving home tired, she finds the body of a dead man who she thought she had mistakenly hit with her car. In reality, the man was an abusive father that was killed by his daughter, Eun Hee-soo, who had left his body in the middle of the street.

Thinking she had killed the man, Min Kyug-chae started to provide for the man's family and eventually invited them to stay in her home. Kyung-chae's mother resents Hee-soo and her mother with a passion worrying that Hee-soo might take over the house one day. Kyung-chae thinks that her mother misunderstands Hee-soo and treats her like family. Hee-soo is fascinated by Kyung-chae's luck decides that she will take everything away from Kyung-chae and her family. After she manages to get a job at the hotel, she seduces Kyung-chae's boyfriend, Han Ji-sub, into dating her. When Kyung-chae finds out, she feels betrayed and heartbroken when she sees Ji-sub and Hee-soo kissing on the rooftop of the hotel. One day, Hee-soo asks Ji-sub to help get Kyung-chae's father, the CEO of the hotel, Min Dong-chul arrested for corruption. Kyung-chae became determined to find out who did this to her father. Soon after Kyung-chae finds out that it was Hee-soo, they become enemies. Hee-soo then manages to convince the board of directors into firing Kyung-chae from her position as Vice President. Hee-soo goes back to Kyung-chae's house and sets the house on fire, killing Kyung-chae's mother, Mrs Yeo, who is half-paralyzed. The incident leaves Kyung-chae, her sister, Eun-chae and her father homeless and penniless. Kyung-chae's father was released because of health conditions and memory loss. Luckily, Kyung-chae gets help from her trusted friend, Jin Soo-hyuk. Soo-hyuk helps Kyung-chae get a job at his restaurant. Soo-hyuk used to work as the hotel's chef but quit when he learned what had happened to Kyung-chae. Meanwhile, Hee-soo becomes the new Vice President of Mona Lisa Hotel. She manages to marry Han Ji-sub and now lives in Kyung-chae's house which had been rebuilt. Kyung-chae and Soo-hyuk soon get a job at the hotel where Soo-hyuk becomes CEO and Kyung-chae is a representative of Mona Lisa Hotel's working partner, Lubyni. Their intentions were to seek revenge on Hee-soo and get back whatever she lost. Hee-soo soon goes through many problems with her in-laws. She fakes a pregnancy which loses her mother-in-law's trust in her. Ji-sub tries to stop Hee-soo before it's too late but Hee-soo would not listen. The bank tries to auction off her house as she did not pay back her debt on time. Feeling stressed and running out of ideas, she tries to get help from her lawyer who eventually turns his back on her too. Kyung-chae sues Hee-soo and gets Hee-soo to go to court. After Hee-soo admits to all her crimes, she is sentenced to life in prison. Hee-soo soon finds out she is dying of a terminal disease. When Kyung-chae finds out she rushes to meet Hee-soo in prison. Hee-soo warns Kyung-chae that she will never seek forgiveness from Kyung-chae and she faints. After being rushed to the hospital, she lies in bed weak and tired. She visits Kyung-chae's deceased mother at the crematorium house and begs for forgiveness. Not long after that, Kyung-chae and Soo-hyuk visit Mrs Yeo together because she had told Soo-hyuk to put on her engagement ring on in front of her mother. That night, Hee-soo calls Kyung-chae to meet her at the hospital. After talking, Hee-soo passes away because of the disease, and her mother ends up in prison.

== Cast ==
=== Main characters ===
- Park Eun-hye as Min Kyung-chae
- Wang Bit-na as Eun Hee-soo
- Kang Ji-sub as Han Ji-sub
- Kang Kyung-joon as Jin Soo-hyuk

=== Supporting characters ===
People around Min Kyung-chae

- Han Jin-hee as Min Dong-chul
- Lee Hwi-hyang as Yeo Ok-sun
- Kim Da-ye as Min Eun-chae

People around Eun Hee-soo

- Kim Chung as Gong Bok-ja
- Song Kyung-chul as Eun Ki-man

People around Han Ji-sub

- Im Ha-ryong as Han Byung-gook
- Seo Kap-sook as Ki Chan-sook
- Lee Yong-joo as Han Pil-sub

People around Jin Soo-hyuk

- Sa Mi-ja as Na Hae-geum
- Son Se-bin as Jin Soo-hee

=== Other characters ===
- Yoon Seo-hyun as Moon Jae-shik
- Lee Yoon-mi as Monica Kim

== Remake ==
- Malaysia - A Malaysian remake of Two Women Room titled Monalisa premiered on 20 March 2018 on Astro Prima. Starring Zara Zya and Mona Allen.

== International broadcast ==
- It aired in Vietnam on TodayTV VTC7 from August 4, 2014, under the title Đoạt tình.
- On aired in Malaysia (Astro Prima & Astro Maya HD) from March 20, 2018, as an adaptation drama under the title
- It aired in South Africa on eExtra from August 2, 2021, under the title Two Women.

It aired in Myanmar on MRTV-4 with Myanmar subtitles under the title ပန်းနှစ်ပွင့်ရဲ့ ဒဏ္ဍာရီ (Legend of Two Flowers).
