= List of South Korean films of 2004 =

A list of films produced in South Korea in 2004:

== Box office ==
The highest-grossing South Korean films released in 2004, by domestic box office admissions, are as follows:

Highest-grossing films released in 2004
Rank	Title	Distributor	Admissions
1	Taegukgi	Showbox	11,746,135
2	My Little Bride	Korea Pictures	3,149,500
3	Once Upon a Time in High School	CJ Entertainment	3,115,767
4	Ghost House	Cinema Service	2,890,000
5	A Moment to Remember	CJ Entertainment	2,565,078
6	My Brother	CJ Entertainment	2,479,585
7	Fighter in the Wind	Big Blue Film	2,346,446
8	Windstruck	CJ Entertainment	2,199,359
9	Temptation of Wolves	Showbox	2,189,453
10	The Big Swindle	Showbox	2,129,358

== A–F ==
English/Korean title	Director	Cast	Genre	Notes
2004
100 Days with Mr. Arrogant	Shin Jai-ho	Ha Ji-won; Kim Jaewon		
3-Iron	Kim Ki-duk	Lee Seung-yeon; Jae Hee	Romantic drama	
Arahan	Ryoo Seung-wan	Ryoo Seung-bum; Yoon So-yi		
Au Revoir, UFO	Kim Jin-min	Lee Eun-ju; Lee Beom-soo		
A Moment to Remember	John H. Lee	Son Ye-jin; Jung Woo-sung		
The Big Swindle	Choi Dong-hoon	Park Shin-yang; Yum Jung-ah		
Bunshinsaba	Ahn Byeong-ki	Kim Gyu-ri; Lee Se-eun		
Clementine	Kim De-yeong	Lee Dong-jun; Steven Seagal		
Dance with the Wind	Park Jung-woo	Lee Sung-jae; Park Sol-mi		
Desire	Kim Eung-soo	Lee Soo-ah; Lee Dong-gyu		
Dead Friend	Kim Tae-gyeong	Kim Ha-neul; Nam Sang-mi		
DMZ	Lee Kyu-hyung			
Doll Master	Jeong Yong-ki	Kim Yoo-mi; Lim Eun-kyung		
Doma Ahn Jung-geun	Seo Se-won	Yu Oh-seong; Yoon Joo-sang	Action; Drama	
Don't Tell Papa	Lee Sang-hoon	Jung Woong-in; Yoo Seung-ho; Chae Min-seo	Comedy; Drama	
Everybody Has Secrets	Jang Hyeon-su	Lee Byung-hun; Choi Ji-woo		
Face	Yoo Sang-gon	Song Yoon-ah; Shin Hyun-joon		
A Family	Lee Jeong-cheol	Soo Ae; Joo Hyun		
Father and Son: The Story of Mencius	Kim Ji-yeong	Cho Jae-hyun; Son Chang-min		
Feathers in the Wind/Git	Song Il-gon	Jang Hyun-sung; Lee So-yeon		
Fighter in the Wind	Yang Yun-ho	Yang Dong-geun; Masaya Kato; Aya Hirayama		
Flying Boys	Byun Young-joo	Yoon Kye-sang; Kim Min-jung	Teen film Drama	
Foolish Game	Im Jin-pyeong	Kim Tae-yeon; Lee Dong-kyu		

== G–Z ==
English/Korean title	Director	Cast	Genre	Notes
Ghost House	Kim Sang-jin	Cha Seung-won; Jang Seo-hee		
Hammerboy	An Tae-geun	Kim Seo-yeong; Bae Jeong-min	Animated	
He Was Cool	Lee Hwan-gyeong	Song Seung-heon; Jeong Da-bin		
Hi! Dharma 2: Showdown in Seoul	Yook Sang-hyo	Jung Jin-young; Shin Hyun-joon; Lee Won-jong		Sequel to Hi! Dharma!
Hypnotized	Kim In-sik	Kim Hye-soo; Kim Tae-woo		
Ice Rain	Kim Eun-sook	Lee Sung-jae; Song Seung-heon; Kim Ha-neul		
Liar	Kim Kyeong-hyeong	Joo Jin-mo; Gong Hyung-jin		
Love, So Divine	Heo In-moo	Ha Ji-won; Kwon Sang-woo	Romantic comedy	
Lovely Rivals	Jang Gyu-seong	Yum Jung-ah; Lee Se-young		
Low Life	Im Kwon-taek	Cho Seung-woo; Kim Min-sun		
The Magic Police	Lee Han-yeol	Park Jun-hyung; Jeong Jong-chul; Kim Shi-deok; Yang Jae-hee		
Marrying High School Girl	Oh Deok-hwan	Lim Eun-kyung; Eun Ji-won; Shim Yi-young		
Mokpo, Gangster's Paradise	Kim Jee-hoon	Cha In-pyo; Cho Jae-hyun		
A Moment to Remember	John H. Lee	Jung Woo-sung; Son Ye-jin	Romance	Based on Japanese TV show Pure Soul
Mr. Gam's Victory	Kim Jong-hyun	Lee Beom-soo; Ryu Seung-soo; Gong Yoo	Sports	
Mr. Handy, Mr. Hong	Kang Seok-beom	Uhm Jung-hwa; Kim Joo-hyuk		
My Brother	Ahn Gwon-tae	Won Bin; Shin Ha-kyun		
My Generation	Noh Dong-seok			
My Little Bride	Kim Ho-jun	Moon Geun-young; Kim Rae-won	Romantic comedy	
My Mother, the Mermaid	Park Heung-sik	Jeon Do-yeon; Park Hae-il		
The President's Barber	Im Chan-sang	Song Kang-ho; Moon So-ri		
Once Upon a Time in High School: The Spirit of Jeet Kune Do	Yoo Ha	Kwon Sang-woo; Han Ga-in; Lee Jung-jin	Bildungsroman, High-teen drama, Guy-cry film	
R-Point	Kong Su-chang	Kam Woo-sung; Son Byong-ho	Mystery horror	
Repatriation	Kim Dong-won		Documentary	
Rikidōzan	Song Hae-sung	Sul Kyung-gu; Miki Nakatani	Biographical, Sports drama	
S Diary	Kwon Jong-kwan	Kim Sun-a; Kim Soo-ro; Gong Yoo	Romantic comedy	
Samaritan Girl	Kim Ki-duk	Kwak Ji-min; Seo Min-jeong		
The Scarlet Letter	Byun Hyuk	Han Suk-kyu; Lee Eun-ju		Actress Lee Eun-ju's last film before committing suicide
Shinsukki Blues	Kim Do-hyuk	Lee Sung-jae; Lee Jong-hyuk; Kim Hyun-joo		
Shit Up!/None of Your Cheek	Oh Ji-myeong	Choi Bool-am; Roh Joo-hyun		
Sisily 2km/To Catch a Virgin Ghost	Shin Jung-won	Im Chang-jung	Horror comedy	
A Smile	Pak Kyung-hee	Chu Sang-mi		
So Cute	Kim Su-hyeon	Kim Suk-hoon; Ye Ji-won		Entered into the 26th Moscow International Film Festival
Some	Chang Yoon-hyun	Go Soo; Song Ji-hyo		
Someone Special	Jang Jin	Lee Na-young; Jung Jae-young		
Spider Forest	Song Il-gon	Kam Woo-sung; Seo Jung	Psychological thriller	
Springtime	Ryu Jang-ha	Choi Min-sik		
Spy Girl	Park Han-jun	Kim Jung-hwa; Gong Yoo	Spy film Romantic comedy	
Sweet Sixties	Lee Su-in	Joo Hyun		
Taegukgi	Kang Je-gyu	Jang Dong-gun; Won Bin	War	
Three... Extremes	Park Chan-wook	Lee Byung-hun; Im Won-hee; Kang Hye-jung	Horror	A multi-lingual trilogy, second story, Cut in Korean; Follow-up to Three
Too Beautiful to Lie	Bae Hyung-joon	Kim Ha-neul; Kang Dong-won	Romantic comedy	Nominated for the Baeksang Arts Awards, Blue Dragon Film Awards, and Korean Film Awards
Two Guys	Park Heon-soo	Cha Tae-hyun; Park Joong-hoon	Comedy	
A Wacky Switch	Jeong Yeon-won	Jung Joon-ho; Son Chang-min; Jeon Mi-seon		
When I Turned Nine	Yun In-ho	Kim Suk; Lee Se-young		
Who's Got the Tape?	Jo Jin-kyu			
Windstruck	Kwak Jae-yong	Jun Ji-hyun; Jang Hyuk		
The Wolf Returns	Ku Ja-hong	Yang Dong-geun; Hwang Jung-min		
Woman Is the Future of Man	Hong Sang-soo	Yoo Ji-tae; Kim Tae-woo; Sung Hyun-ah		Entered into the 2004 Cannes Film Festival
