= List of South Korean films of 2005 =

This is a list of South Korean films released in 2005.

== Box office ==
The highest-grossing South Korean films released in 2005, by domestic box office gross revenue, are as follows:

Highest-grossing films released in 2005
Rank	Title	Distributor	Domestic gross
1	The King and the Clown	CJ Entertainment	$42,752,153
2	Welcome to Dongmakgol	Showbox	$27,986,474
3	Marrying the Mafia II	Showbox	$19,862,842
4	Marathon	Showbox	$18,240,765
5	Typhoon	CJ Entertainment	$17,058,122
6	Another Public Enemy	CJ Entertainment	$15,430,985
7	Lady Vengeance	CJ Entertainment	$14,214,470
8	You Are My Sunshine	CJ Entertainment	$12,251,043
9	Mapado	CJ Entertainment	$11,624,707
10	All for Love	CJ Entertainment	$10,208,564

== A-I ==
English/Korean Title	Director	Cast	Genre	Notes
2005
The Aggressives	Jeong Jae-eun	Chun Jung-myung; Kim Kang-woo		
All for Love	Min Kyu-dong	Uhm Jung-hwa; Hwang Jung-min		
Another Public Enemy	Kang Woo-suk	Sul Kyung-gu; Jung Joon-ho	Crime	
Antarctic Journal	Yim Pil-sung	Song Kang-ho; Yoo Ji-tae		
April Snow	Hur Jin-ho	Bae Yong-joon; Son Ye-jin		
The Art of Seduction	Oh Ki-hwan	Son Ye-jin; Song Il-kook		
The Beast and the Beauty	Lee Gae-byok	Ryoo Seung-bum; Shin Min-a		
A Bittersweet Life	Kim Jee-woon	Lee Byung-hun; Kim Yeong-cheol		Screened at the 2005 Cannes Film Festival
Blood Rain	Kim Dae-seung	Cha Seung-won; Park Yong-woo; Ji Sung	Thriller; Mystery	Won multiple awards in 2005 at the Chunsa Film Art Awards, Grand Bell Awards, Blue Dragon Film Awards and Korean Film Awards, and in 2006 at the Yubari International Fantastic Film Festival and Baeksang Arts Awards.
A Bold Family/Super Family	Jo Myeong-nam	Kam Woo-sung; Kim Soo-ro		
The Bow	Kim Ki-duk	Han Yeo-reum		Screened at the 2005 Cannes Film Festival
Cello	Lee Woo-cheol	Sung Hyun-ah		
Chulsoo & Younghee	Hwang Gyu-deok	Jeon Ha-eun; Park Tae-young; Jung Jin-young		
Cracked Eggs and Noodles	Oh Sang-hoon	Im Chang-jung		
Crying Fist	Ryoo Seung-wan	Choi Min-sik; Ryoo Seung-bum		
Daddy-Long-Legs	Gong Jeong-shik	Ha Ji-won; Yeon Jung-hoon		
Diary of June	Im Kyeong-soo	Shin Eun-kyung; Yunjin Kim; Eric Mun		
Duelist	Lee Myung-se	Ha Ji-won; Gang Dong-won; Ahn Sung-ki		
Empress Chung	Nelson Shin		Animated	North and South Korean co-production
Feathers in the Wind	Song Il-gon	Jang Hyun-sung; Lee So-yeon		
Green Chair	Park Chul-soo	Seo Jung; Shim Ji-ho		
Haan (Han Gil-su)	Lee In-soo	Ahn Jae-mo; Im Yoo-jin	Spy Thriller	
Heaven's Soldiers	Min Joon-ki	Park Joong-hoon; Kim Seung-woo; Hwang Jung-min		
Hello, Brother	Im Tae-hyung	Park Ji-bin; Bae Jong-ok; Park Won-sang; Oh Ji-hye		
Innocent Steps	Park Young-hoon	Moon Geun-young; Park Gun-hyung		

== J-Z ==
English/Korean Title	Director	Cast	Genre	Notes
Jenny, Juno	Kim Ho-joon	Park Min-ji; Kim Hye-seong		
The King and the Clown	Lee Joon-ik	Kam Woo-sung; Jung Jin-young; Lee Joon-gi		
Lee Dae-ro Can't Die	Lee Young-eun	Lee Beom-soo		
Life Goes On	Ryu Mi-rye		Documentary	
Long and Winding Road	Gu Seong-ju	Go Doo-shim; Son Byong-ho; Kim Ye-ryeong		
Love in Magic	Cheon Se-hwan	Yeon Jung-hoon; Park Jin-hee		
Love Is a Crazy Thing	Oh Seok-geun	Jeon Mi-seon		
Love Talk	Lee Yoon-ki	Bae Jong-ok; Park Jin-hee; Park Hee-soon		
Mapado:Island of Fortunes	Choo Chang-min	Lee Moon-sik; Lee Jung-jin		
Marathon	Jeong Yoon-chul	Cho Seung-woo; Kim Mi-sook; Lee Ki-young		
Marrying the Mafia II	Jeong Yong-ki	Shin Hyun-joon; Kim Won-hee		
Mr. Socrates	Choi Jin-won	Kang Shin-il; Kim Rae-won		
Murder, Take One/The Big Scene	Jang Jin	Cha Seung-won; Shin Ha-kyun; Park Jung-ah; Kim Ji-soo		
My Boyfriend Is Type B	Choi Seok-won	Han Ji-hye; Lee Dong-gun		
My Girl and I	Jeon Yun-su	Cha Tae-hyun; Song Hye-kyo		
My Right to Ravage Myself	Jeon Soo-il	Jeong Bo-seok; Chu Sang-mi; Jang Hyun-sung		Based on the novel I Have the Right to Destroy Myself by Kim Young-ha; Selected to appear at the 2003 Pusan International Film Festival and the 2004 Fribourg International Film Festival
Olympus Guardian	Kim Jun		Animated	
Possible Changes	Min Byung-kuk	Jung Chan; Yoon Ji-hye; Kim Yu-seok		
The President's Last Bang	Im Sang-soo	Han Suk-kyu; Baek Yoon-sik		
Princess Aurora	Bang Eun-jin	Uhm Jung-hwa; Moon Sung-keun		
The Red Shoes	Kim Yong-gyun	Kim Hye-soo; Kim Sung-soo		
Red Eye	Kim Dong-bin	Jang Shin-young; Song Il-gook		
Rules of Dating	Han Jae-rim	Park Hae-il; Kang Hye-jung		
Sa-kwa	Kang Yi-kwan	Moon So-ri; Kim Tae-woo		
Sad Movie	Kwon Jong-kwan	Cha Tae-hyun; Jung Woo-sung		
Seoul Raiders	Jingle Ma	Tony Leung Chiu Wai; Shu Qi; Richie Ren		
Shadowless Sword	Kim Young-jun	Yoon So-yi; Lee Seo-jin; Shin Hyun-joon		
She's on Duty	Park Kwang-chun	Kim Sun-a; Gong Yoo		
Spying Cam	Hwang Cheol-min	Chu Hyeon-yeop; Yang Young-jo	Drama; Mystery	
Lady Vengeance	Park Chan-wook	Lee Young-ae; Choi Min-sik	Thriller	
Tale of Cinema	Hong Sang-soo	Kim Sang-kyung; Uhm Ji-won		Entered into the 2005 Cannes Film Festival
This Charming Girl	Lee Yoon-ki	Kim Ji-soo; Hwang Jung-min	Drama	
The Twins	Park Heung-sik	Jung Joon-ho; Yoon So-yi		
Typhoon	Kwak Kyung-taek	Jang Dong-gun; Lee Jung-jae		
The Unforgiven	Yoon Jong-bin	Ha Jung-woo		Screened at the 2006 Cannes Film Festival
Voice	Choi Ik-hwan	Kim Ok-vin; Seo Ji-hye	Horror	
Waiting for Spring	Jeong Su-yeon		Documentary	
Wedding Campaign	Hwang Byeong-guk	Jung Jae-young; Yoo Jun-sang; Soo Ae		
Welcome to Dongmakgol	Park Kwang-hyun	Shin Ha-kyun; Jung Jae-young; Kang Hye-jung		
Wet Dreams 2	Jeong Cho-shin	Kang Eun-bi		
The Wig	Won Shin-yun	Chae Min-seo		
You Are My Sunshine	Park Jin-pyo	Jeon Do-yeon; Hwang Jung-min	Romantic drama	

== See also ==
- List of Korean-language films
- List of South Korean actresses
- List of South Korean male actors
- 2005 in South Korea
- 2005 in South Korean music
