= Ae-ran Kim =

Ae-ran Kim or Kim Ae-ran may refer to:

- Ae-ran Kim (writer)
- Kim Ae-ran (actress)
