= Something About 1% =

South Korean TV drama

- Also known as: 1% of Anything; Something About 1 Percent
- Hangul: 1%의 어떤 것
- RR: 1%ui eotteon geot
- MR: 1%ŭi ŏttŏn kŏt
- Genre: Drama
- Based on: Something About 1% by Hyun Go-woon
- Written by: Hyun Go-woon
- Directed by: Jang Geun-Su
- Starring: Gang Dong-won; Kim Jung-hwa
- Country of origin: South Korea
- Original language: Korean
- No. of episodes: 26

Original release
- Network: MBC
- Release: July 6 – December 28, 2003

Related
- Something About 1% (2016)

Something About 1% (Korean: 1%의 어떤 것; lit. 1% of Something) is a South Korean TV drama that was broadcast on Sunday mornings for 26 episodes from July 6 to December 28, 2003. Its central characters are played by film star Gang Dong-won and Kim Jung-hwa of SBS's 2002 TV drama, Glass Slippers. This romantic comedy drama series is based on an original novel of the same title, and it is a classic tale of boy-meets-girl. The plot follows traditional love stories of clashing personalities, familial obstacles and triumphant love-conquers-all themes.

== Synopsis ==
Kim Da-hyun is a kind-hearted elementary school teacher who helps an elderly man who passed out behind her school while she was in the middle of her class. The "old man" turns out to be Chairman Lee, a multimillionaire CEO of one of the largest conglomerate corporations in South Korea, and Da-hyun's act of kindness towards the Chairman leads to a series of strange events. She is written into his will and stands to inherit all of his fortunes. The Chairman's two grandchildren will see none of the inheritance, unless they choose to sincerely woo, win, and marry Da-hyun. Caught in this web is Lee Jae-in, one of Chairman Lee's grandsons, who had worked hard to rise in the corporate world without his grandfather's help. At first unwilling to play his grandfather's game for control, Jae-in is abrasive and constantly fights with Da-hyun as they attempt to negotiate the strange turn of events for the better. In the end, the two fall in love despite the differences in their personalities, objections from their families, and other obstacles.

== Cast ==
=== Main ===
- Gang Dong-won as Lee Jae-in
- Kim Jung-hwa as Kim Da-hyun
- Han Hye-jin as Yoo Hyun-jin
- Lee Byung-wook as Min Tae-ha
- Kim Ji-woo as Lee Jae-young
- Kim Seung-min as Kim Hyung-joon

=== Supporting ===
==== Da-hyun's family ====
- Kim Young-ran as Jung Mi-jung (mother)
- Choi Sang-hoon as Kim Jin-man (father)
- Kyung Joon as Kim Seo-hyeon (older brother)
- Heo Jung-min as Kim Jun-hyeon (younger brother)

==== Jae-in's family ====
- Byun Hee-bong as Lee Kyu-chul (grandfather)
- Lee Hee-do as Kim Dong-suk (secretary)
- Oh Mi-yun as Yum Sun-hee (mother)
- Kim Chung as Lee Soo-young (aunt, Tae-ha's mother)
- Jun In-taek as Min Hyuk-joo (uncle, Tae-ha's father)

==== Other people ====
- Choi Min-soo
- Yoo Gun
- Jung Min-ah as Child getting surgery
- Ahn Jung-yoon
- Wang Ji-hye as Han Joo-hee
- Kim Min-kyung
- Jo Jung-eun
- Shin Dong-mi as Heo Yoo-kyeong, SH Emerald Hotel.

== Remake ==
In March 2016, it was announced that a remake will be put in production with Ha Seok-jin and Jeon So-min taking on the roles previously portrayed by Gang Dong-won and Kim Jung-hwa, respectively. Hyun Go-woon wrote the screenplay while Kang Chul-woo (Cheo Yong) took over the director's job.
