= Marriage Is a Crazy Thing =

- Theatrical poster
- Hangul: 결혼은, 미친 짓이다
- Hanja: 結婚은, 미친 짓이다
- RR: Gyeolhoneun, michin jisida
- MR: Kyŏrhonŭn, mich'in chisida
- Directed by: Yoo Ha
- Written by: Yoo Ha
- Based on: Marriage Is a Crazy Thing by Lee Man-gyo
- Produced by: Cha Seung-jae
- Starring: Kam Woo-sung; Uhm Jung-hwa
- Cinematography: Kim Young-ho
- Edited by: Park Gok-ji
- Music by: Kim Jun-seok; Jo Seong-woo
- Release date: April 26, 2002
- Running time: 103 minutes
- Country: South Korea
- Language: Korean
- Box office: US$6,558,851

Marriage Is a Crazy Thing is a 2002 South Korean erotic romance film starring Kam Woo-sung and Uhm Jung-hwa. This film was directed by South Korean poet-turned-director Yoo Ha as his second film.

== Story ==
Joon-young (Kam Woo-sung) is a Korean professor of English literature and a perpetual bachelor. But when he meets Yeon-hee (Uhm Jung-hwa) on a blind date, his days of bachelorhood seem numbered. But because of the views both of them have on marriage, she marries someone else and the professor becomes her kept man, living with her only on weekends. But even this limited relationship brings up the conflicts that result in fights and jealousy.

== Cast ==
- Kam Woo-sung - Joon-young
- Uhm Jung-hwa - Yeon-hee
- Park Won-sang - Kyu-jin
- Kang So-jung - Se-eun
- Yoon Ye-ri - Yoo-ri
- Kim Ki-cheon - uncle
- Lee Ju-sil - mother
- Ryu Hyun-kyung - female student part-time worker

== Awards ==
2002 Korean Film Awards

- Best New Actor - Kam Woo-sung

2003 Baeksang Arts Awards

- Best Actress - Uhm Jung-hwa
