= Say It with Your Eyes =

South Korean television series

- Also known as: In Your Eyes; Speak With Your Eyes; Say With Your Eyes
- Hangul: 눈으로 말해요
- RR: Nuneuro malhaeyo
- MR: Nunŭro marhaeyo
- Genre: Romance
- Created by: Kim Seung-soo
- Written by: Oh Young-sook; Min Hyo Jung
- Directed by: Go Dong-sun
- Starring: Kam Woo-sung; Go Soo; Jeon Hye-jin; Kim Sung-kyum
- Country of origin: South Korea
- Original language: Korean
- No. of episodes: 54

Production
- Running time: 60 minutes

Original release
- Network: MBC
- Release: March 19, 2000 – March 25, 2001

Say It With Your Eyes (Korean: 눈으로 말해요) is a South Korean television drama produced and broadcast by MBC from March 19, 2000, to March 25, 2001.

== Cast ==
- Kam Woo-sung as Ki-woong
- Go Soo as Ki-ryong (Ki-woong's younger brother)
- Kim Sung-kyum as Ki-woong's father (a retired detective)
- Jeon Hye-jin as In-kyung
- Lee Jung-gil as In-kyung's father
- Yoon Mi-ra as In-kyung's aunt
- Song Ji-eun
- Sa Mi-ja as Youngja (In-kyung's mother)
- Lee Jin-woo as product planning representative
- Lee Ah-hyun as product planning employee
- Kim Hyung-il
- Park Gwang-jeong as product planning team manager
- Kim Yong-hee
- Yun Hae
- Lee Hee-do
