= Spy Girl =

2004 South Korean film

- Theatrical poster
- Hangul: 그녀를 모르면 간첩
- Hanja: 그女를 모르면 間諜
- RR: Geunyeoreul moreumyeon gancheop
- MR: Kŭnyŏrŭl morŭmyŏn kanch'ŏp
- Directed by: Park Han-jun
- Written by: Ha Won-jun
- Produced by: Myeong Sang-pyo
- Starring: Kim Jung-hwa; Gong Yoo
- Cinematography: Shin Ok-hyun
- Edited by: Kim Sun-min
- Music by: Lee Jae-jin
- Distributed by: Showbox
- Release date: January 30, 2004
- Running time: 100 minutes
- Country: South Korea
- Language: Korean

Spy Girl (Korean: 그녀를 모르면 간첩; lit. 'Those Who Don't Know Her Are Spies') is a 2004 South Korean film starring Kim Jung-hwa and Gong Yoo.,

== Plot ==
A group of students run a website devoted to the girls who work at their local Burger King. When Ko-bong falls head over heels with new girl Hyo-jin, he promptly posts some pictures of her on the internet, and before long she becomes something of a local celebrity. However, little does he realize that his would-be girlfriend is in fact a North Korean spy who is trying to keep a low profile.

== Cast ==
- Kim Jung-hwa - Park Hyo-jin
- Gong Yoo - Choi Go-bong
- Nam Sang-mi - Nam Jin-ah
- Baek Il-seob - Park Mu-sun
- Kim Ae-kyung - Oh Mi-jae
- Jadu - Park Hyo-jin
- Jo Dal-hwan - Song Hyo-guk
- Ahn Hae-suk - Ko-bong's mother
- Kim Myung-guk - Ko-bong's father
- Yoo In-young - Woo Wol-ran
- Park Kyung-hwan - Man in black suit
- Kim Ki-hwan - Male student
- Lee Kwang-ki - Kim Young-kwang
- Baek Seung-hee - Young woman
- Park Jin-taek - Manager
