= Miss Monte-Cristo =

2021 South Korean television daily drama

- Promotional poster
- Hangul: 미스 몬테크리스토
- RR: Miseu Montekeuriseuto
- MR: Misŭ Mont'ek'ŭrisŭt'o
- Genre: Melodrama; Revenge; Romance
- Created by: Moon Jun-ha; KBS Drama Division
- Written by: Jeong Hye-won
- Directed by: Park Ki-ho
- Starring: Lee So-yeon; Choi Yeo-jin; Kyung Sung-hwan; Lee Sang-bo
- Music by: Studio Snow
- Opening theme: "I'll Give You Back"
- Country of origin: South Korea
- Original language: Korean
- No. of episodes: 100

Production
- Executive producer: Kim Sang-hui (KBS)
- Producers: Ham Young-geol; Kim Jin-cheon; Choi-wook
- Camera setup: Single-camera
- Running time: 40 minutes
- Production companies: UBICULTURE; May Queen Pictures

Original release
- Network: KBS2
- Release: February 15 – July 2, 2021

Miss Monte-Cristo (Korean: 미스 몬테크리스토) is a 2021 South Korean television series starring Lee So-yeon, Choi Yeo-jin, Kyung Sung-hwan and Lee Sang-bo. The series, directed by Park Ki-ho and written by Jeong Hye-won, revolves around Go Eun-jo (Lee So-yeon) a fashion designer. She vows revenge on all those friends who bring her downfall. The drama is loosely based on the famous French novel The Count of Monte Cristo by Alexandre Dumas hence the title.

The daily drama premiered on KBS2 on February 15, 2021, and aired every weekday at 19:50 (KST) till July 2.

== Synopsis ==
Go Eun-jo (Lee So-yeon) is a fashion designer. She wants to make people around her happy, but her friends betray her and she loses everything. Swearing revenge on all those responsible for her downfall, after 5 years she comes back as Hwang Ga-heun, the daughter of Hong Kong's investor Jin Hwang.

== Cast ==
=== Main ===
- Lee So-yeon as Go Eun-jo/Hwang Ga-heun (Huang Jiaxin)

30 years old, fashion designer, called the 'sell out queen' of Dongdaemun, head of the Jaewang Fashion design manager, Seon-hyeok's lover, Ha-ra, Se-rin and Bo-mi's friend. She falls into death because of a conspiracy of her friends. After 5 years she comes back as Hwang Ga-heun the daughter of Hong Kong's investor Hwang Ji-na to take revenge. In the end, she lost all her memories due to trauma after witnessing Hara's suicide in the bridge and continues to live happily with her family.

- Choi Yeo-jin as Oh Ha-ra

30 years old, Ha-joon's step-sister, an actress, possessive and obsessive. She conspires to win her unrequited love for Cha Seon-hyeok. She is evil to the core as she killed Eun-Jo's baby and father. In the end, she can no longer hide her crimes and kills herself in the same bridge where she pushed Eun-jo five years ago.

- Kyung Sung-hwan as Cha Seon-hyeok

34 years old, Eun-jo's first love, Bo-mi's brother, Cho-sim's son, director of Jaewang Group strategy planning. He was about to marry Eun-jo when she fell victim to a conspiracy.

- Lee Sang-bo as Oh Ha-joon

34 years old, Ha-ra's stepbrother, executive managing director of Jaewang Group, an all around multi-entertainer.

=== Supporting ===
People around Go Eun-jo

- Jung Seung-ho as Go Sang-man

62 years old, Eun-jo's father, owner of Goeun Shopping Complex.

- Kim Mi-ra as Bae Soon-jeong

58 years old, Eun-jo's mother.

- Han Gi-yoon as Go Eun-gyeol

24 years old, Eun-jo's brother, mentally 7 years old, adores his sister.

- Oh Mi-hee as Hwang Ji-na/Hwang Cheon-gil

58 years old, the late Ga-heun's mother, CEO of White Fund, Eun-jo's godmother.

- Lee Yan as Wang Toong-jo

40 years old, Ji-na's assistant, exponent of various martial arts. In the end, he surrenders himself to the authorities for killing Wook-do.
People around Oh Ha-ra

- Lee Da-hae as Joo Se-rin

30 years old, Tae-sik's daughter, Eun-jo's hometown friend, the leading designer of Miss Joo Collection, a woman of passion and dreams of success by all means, full of envy and greed, responsible for Eun-jo's death. In the end, she learns that Eun-jo is DDM Queen and the one who killed her dad, Joo Tae-sik, she cannot accept that her father was the one who paid for her sins and become mentally ill. She attempted suicide but survived and was admitted to a mental hospital.

- Lee Hwang-eui as Oh Byeong-gook

65 years old, Ha-joon and Ha-ra's father, chairman of Jaewang Group, his first wife Seong Na-yeon passed away and now married to her friend Eun-hwa. It was revealed that he knows that Eun-hwa killed Na-yeon and was using her to boost his power and wealth. He also ordered Wook-do to assassinate Hwang Ji-na, in the end he was arrested for his crimes.

- Kim Kyung-sook as Geum Eun-hwa

58 years old, Byeong-gook's second wife, vice-president of Jaewang Group, Ha-ra's mother and Ha-joon's evil and greedy stepmother. In the end, she was arrested for murdering Na-yeon, embezzlement and conspiring to kill Hwang Ji-na.

- Sunwoo Yong-nyeo as Han Yeong-ae

85 years old, the godmother of Jaewang Group, the late Na-yeon's mother-in-law, strong and wise woman.

- Jang Sun-yool as Cha Hoon

5 years old, Seon-hyeok and Ha-ra's son, kind, pretty and warm-hearted.
People around Cha Seon-hyeok

- Lee Mi-young as Yoon Cho-sim

58 years old, Seon-hyeok and Bo-mi's mother, Ha-ra's mother-in-law, Eun-hwa and the late Na-yeon's high school friend.

- Lee Hye-ran as Cha Bo-mi

30 years old, Seon-hyeok's sister, Cho-sim's daughter, a make-up artist, Seon-hyeok's sister, Ha-ra's sister-in-law, Eun-jo's bestie, very loyal.
Others

- Kwon Oh-hyeon as Joo Tae-sik

65 years old, Se-rin's father, CEO of Jupiter Shopping Mall, a bluff, liar and fraud, Sang-man's hometown friend. In the end, Eun-jo and Deok-gyu killed him by triggering his heart attack.

- Ahn Hee-sung as Na Wook-do

35 years old, Jupiter Shopping Mall head of department, has criminal records. In the end, he was killed by Toong-jo.

- Kim Ae-ran as Park Bong-sook

52 years old, the Jaewang family housekeeper since Na-yeon was around, now she is Eun-hwa's subordinate. She is the only witness to Na-yeon's death.

- Seo Ji-won as Shin Deok-gyu/Choi Young-seok

28 years old, son of Jung-pil, joins Eun-jo with her revenge against Tae-sik, who caused the death of his father. In the end, he surrenders himself for killing Tae-sik so that Eun-jo can continue her revenge.

- Hyun Seung-ho as Secretary Park

Secretary of Oh Byeong-gook.

- Jung Hwi-wook as Kim Kang-ho

Secretary of Geum Eun-hwa.

- Lee Ye-eun as Seong Na-yeon

Ha-joon's mother, Byeong-gook's first wife, Eun-hwa's friend. It was revealed that Eun-hwa killed her.

- Kim Doo-eun as Shin Jung-pil

Deok-gyu's deceased father, owner of Jackpot Clothes, friend of Sang-man and Tae-sik.

- Yang Bom-yi as Hwang Ga-heun

The real Hwang Ga-heun, deceased daughter of Hwang Ji-na.

- Sung Chan-ho as Chairman Tak

A kingmaker who exerts influence in the business world.

== Production ==
=== Casting ===
On November 6, 2020, it was announced that Lee So-yeon will star in the daily drama, returning to TV after one and half year. Later in November Choi Yeo-jin joined as another lead in the cast as rival of Lee So-yeon's character in drama. In December 2020, Lee Hye-ran and Lee Da-hae joined the cast as friends of the protagonist played by Lee So-yeon. Kyung Sung-hwan and Lee Sang Bo also joined the cast as the male protagonists in December.

== Original soundtrack ==
Miss Monte-Cristo

Soundtrack album by Various Artists
- Released: 2021
- Recorded: 2021
- Genre: Soundtrack
- Length: 43:17
- Languages: Korean; English
- Labels: Blending Co., Ltd.; Snow Entertainment Co., Ltd.
- Producers: Snow Entertainment Co., Ltd

=== Miss Monte-Cristo: Original Soundtrack ===
The following is the official track list of Miss Monte-Cristo: Original Soundtrack album, which was released by Blending Co., Ltd on June 30, 2021.

Miss Monte-Cristo: Original Soundtrack

Album released on June 30, 2021
No.	Title	Lyrics	Music	Artist	Length
1.	"I'll Give You Back"	Bom Jeong, Seol Ki-tae, Anais	Seol Ki-tae	Hong Ja	3:30
2.	"Goodbye for You"	Seol Ki-tae, Park Gyeong-don	Park Gyeong-don	Roh Ji-hoon	3:53
3.	"Good love"	Kim Min-jong	Kim Do-hyung	Kim Na-hee	4:21
4.	"Talk Talk"	Jung Bom, Seol Ki-tae	Kim Jun-soo	Byeol-eun	4:04
5.	"The Day of Memories"	Jung Bom, Seol Ki-tae, Anais	Seol Ki-tae	Roh Ji-hoon	3:40
6.	"Don't Forget to Remember"	Keon In-ha	Shim Jae-woong	Kim Na-hee	4:10
7.	"I'll give It Back" (Ballad Ver.)	Bom Jung, Ki- Tae Seol, Anais	Seol Ki-tae	Hongja	3:52
8.	"Pray"	Bigguyrobin	Bigguyrobin	Lee in	4:07
9.	"Amore Triste (Sad Love)"	Park Ji- Hyang	Seol Ki-tae	Ungel Voice	3:52
10.	"Sad Love"	Park Ji- Hyang	Seol Ki-tae	Ungel Voice	3:52
11.	"That Night"	Seol Ki-tae, Lee Ji-hyun	Cho Hwan-hee	Seo Woo-jin	3:54
12.	"Goodbye"	Bom Jeong, Ki-tae Seol, Anais	Kim Jun-su	LIZIA	3:44
13.	"Yes We"	Ki-tae Seol, Cho Hwan-hee	Cho Hwan-hee	Lee Won

=== Singles ===
The following is the track list of singles from Miss Monte-Cristo: Original Soundtrack.

Singles from Miss Monte-Cristo (Parts 1–11)

=== Part 1 ===
Released on February 18, 2021
No.	Title	Lyrics	Music	Artist	Length
1.	"I'll Give It Back" (되돌려줄거야)	Jung Bom, Seol Ki-tae, Anais	Seol Ki-tae	Hong Ja	3:26
2.	"I'll Give It Back" (Inst.)		Seol Ki-tae		3:26
Total length:					6:52

=== Part 2 ===
Released on February 25, 2021
No.	Title	Lyrics	Music	Artist	Length
1.	"Farewell for you" (널 위한 이별)	Seol Ki-tae, Park Gyeong-don	Park Gyeong-don	Roh Ji-hoon	3:52
2.	"Farewell for you" (Inst.)		Park Gyeong-don		3:52
Total length:					7:44

=== Part 3 ===
Released on March 4, 2021
No.	Title	Lyrics	Music	Artist	Length
1.	"Good love" (착한 사랑)	Kim Min-jong	Kim Do-hyung	Kim Na-hee	4:31
2.	"Good love" (Inst.)		Kim Do-hyung		4:31
Total length:					9:02

=== Part 4 ===
Released on March 10, 2021
No.	Title	Lyrics	Music	Artist	Length
1.	"Knock" (톡톡)	Jung Bom, Seol Ki-tae	Kim Jun-soo	Byeol Eun	4:04
2.	"Knock" (Inst.)		Kim Jun-soo		4:04
Total length:					8:08

=== Part 5 ===
Released on March 18, 2021
No.	Title	Lyrics	Music	Artist	Length
1.	"The Day" (추억이 오는 날)	Jung Bom, Seol Ki-tae	Seol Ki-tae	Roh Ji-hoon	3:37
2.	"The Day" (Inst.)		Seol Ki-tae		3:37
Total length:					7:14

=== Part 6 ===
Released on March 30, 2021
No.	Title	Lyrics	Music	Artist	Length
1.	"Don't Forget to Remember"	Keon In-ha	Shim Jae-woong	Kim Na-hee	4:08
2.	"Don't Forget to Remember" (Inst.)		Shim Jae-woong		4:08
Total length:					8:16

=== Part 7 ===
Released on April 8, 2021
No.	Title	Lyrics	Music	Artist	Length
1.	"I'll give It Back" (Ballad Ver.)	Bom Jung, Ki- Tae Seol, Anais	Seol Ki-tae	Hongja	3:50
2.	"I'll give It Back" (Inst.)		Seol Ki-tae		3:50
Total length:					7:40

=== Part 8 ===
Released on April 20, 2021
No.	Title	Lyrics	Music	Artist	Length
1.	"Pray"	Bigguyrobin	Bigguyrobin	Lee in	4:05
2.	"Pray" (Inst.)				4:05
Total length:					8:10

=== Part 9 ===
Released on April 27, 2021
No.	Title	Lyrics	Music	Artist	Length
1.	"Amore Triste (Sad Love)"	Park Ji- Hyang	Seol Ki-tae	Ungel Voice	3:49
2.	"Sad Love (Amore Triste)"	Park Ji- Hyang	Seol Ki-tae	Ungel Voice	3:49
3.	"Amore Triste (Sad Love)" (Inst.)		Seol Ki-tae		3:49
Total length:					11:27

=== Part 10 ===
Released on June 2, 2021
No.	Title	Lyrics	Music	Artist	Length
1.	"That Night" (그날의 밤)	Seol Gi-tae, Ji-hyun	Cho Hwan-hee	Seo Woo-jin	3:52
2.	"That Night" (Inst.)				3:52

=== Part 11 ===
Released on June 18, 2021
No.	Title	Lyrics	Music	Artist	Length
1.	"Hello" (안녕)	Bom Jeong, Gi-tae Seol, Anais	Kim Jun-su	LIZIA	3:44
2.	"Hello" (Inst.)				3:44

== Viewership ==
Miss Monte-Cristo : South Korea viewers per episode (millions)

Episodes	Episode number																			
Episodes	1	2	3	4	5	6	7	8	9	10	11	12	13	14	15	16	17	18	19	20
Ep.01-20	2.406	2.470	2.035	2.013	2.046	2.091	2.249	2.272	2.229	2.118	2.333	2.243	2.199	2.329	2.373	2.294	2.735	2.716	2.517	2.514
Ep.21-40	2.488	2.651	2.570	2.543	2.539	2.489	2.699	2.522	2.519	2.407	2.595	2.801	2.657	2.673	2.579	2.582	2.604	2.263	2.568	2.424
Ep.41-60	2.706	2.552	2.600	2.507	2.808	2.657	2.651	2.510	2.605	2.491	2.568	2.556	2.494	2.601	2.470	2.479	2.657	2.654	2.510	2.480
Ep.61-80	2.631	2.598	2.479	2.624	2.585	2.590	2.566	2.761	2.771	2.489	2.609	2.571	2.507	0.932	2.562	2.516	2.644	2.655	2.566	2.478
Ep.81-100	2.615	2.480	2.465	2.642	2.422	2.421	2.436	2.435	2.567	2.550	2.551	2.626	2.624	2.623	2.797	2.491	2.747	2.598	2.634	2.565

Source: Audience measurement performed nationwide by Nielsen Korea.

Ep.	Original broadcast date	Average audience share		
Ep.	Original broadcast date	Nielsen Korea		TNmS
Ep.	Original broadcast date	Nationwide	Seoul	Nationwide
1	February 15, 2021	14.6%	12.2%	15.7%
2	February 16, 2021	14.5%	12.3%	15.2%
3	February 17, 2021	13.0%	10.9%	14.9%
4	February 18, 2021	12.8%	10.6%	14.5%
5	February 19, 2021	12.5%	10.6%	14.4%
6	February 22, 2021	12.6%	10.8%	13.9%
7	February 23, 2021	13.8%	11.8%	15.2%
8	February 24, 2021	14.2%	12.3%	15.3%
9	February 25, 2021	13.3%	11.2%	15.7%
10	February 26, 2021	13.1%	11.1%	14.7%
11	March 1, 2021	14.2%	12.3%	16.3%
12	March 2, 2021	14.1%	12.1%	16.4%
13	March 3, 2021	13.9%	12.1%	15.3%
14	March 4, 2021	14.8%	12.7%	16.0%
15	March 5, 2021	14.6%	12.9%	16.5%
16	March 8, 2021	14.6%	12.1%	17.0%
17	March 9, 2021	16.1%	13.7%	18.4%
18	March 10, 2021	16.8%	14.3%	18.1%
19	March 11, 2021	15.7%	13.2%	18.2%
20	March 12, 2021	15.3%	13.2%	18.1%
21	March 15, 2021	15.8%	13.3%	18.2%
22	March 16, 2021	16.4%	14.7%	18.9%
23	March 17, 2021	15.9%	13.7%	18.6%
24	March 18, 2021	16.0%	13.9%	18.1%
25	March 19, 2021	16.1%	14.0%	17.8%
26	March 22, 2021	15.9%	13.3%	19.2%
27	March 23, 2021	16.7%	14.5%	18.9%
28	March 24, 2021	16.0%	13.7%	18.4%
29	March 25, 2021	15.9%	14.1%	18.5%
30	March 26, 2021	15.4%	13.2%	19.0%
31	March 29, 2021	16.8%	14.5%	18.8%
32	March 30, 2021	16.8%	14.4%	19.1%
33	March 31, 2021	16.6%	13.9%	17.6%
34	April 1, 2021	16.7%	13.9%	18.9%
35	April 2, 2021	15.9%	14.3%	18.4%
36	April 5, 2021	16.4%	13.9%	18.0%
37	April 6, 2021	16.4%	13.7%	19.7%
38	April 7, 2021	13.9%	11.2%	16.3%
39	April 8, 2021	16.2%	13.4%	18.7%
40	April 9, 2021	15.4%	12.7%	17.9%
41	April 12, 2021	17.2%	14.4%	19.6%
42	April 13, 2021	15.8%	12.8%	18.9%
43	April 14, 2021	16.3%	13.5%	18.4%
44	April 15, 2021	15.4%	12.6%	18.9%
45	April 16, 2021	17.3%	15.0%	17.6%
46	April 19, 2021	16.7%	14.5%	18.5%
47	April 20, 2021	16.8%	13.8%	18.2%
48	April 21, 2021	15.6%	13.6%	18.0%
49	April 22, 2021	16.1%	13.9%	18.0%
50	April 23, 2021	16.1%	13.8%	17.4%
51	April 26, 2021	15.4%	13.5%	19.3%
52	April 27, 2021	15.8%	13.1%	18.8%
53	April 28, 2021	15.3%	13.6%	17.4%
54	April 29, 2021	16.6%	14.6%	19.0%
55	April 30, 2021	15.4%	13.5%	19.4%
56	May 3, 2021	15.7%	13.5%	18.2%
57	May 4, 2021	16.7%	14.4%	18.6%
58	May 5, 2021	15.9%	14.3%	17.8%
59	May 6, 2021	15.9%	14.0%	17.5%
60	May 7, 2021	15.5%	13.6%	17.2%
61	May 10, 2021	16.7%	15.1%	18.1%
62	May 11, 2021	15.7%	13.2%	18.3%
63	May 12, 2021	15.5%	13.5%	17.4%
64	May 13, 2021	16.0%	14.1%	17.8%
65	May 14, 2021	16.1%	14.3%	16.8%
66	May 17, 2021	16.2%	14.0%	18.6%
67	May 18, 2021	16.3%	13.7%	17.8%
68	May 19, 2021	16.7%	14.5%	17.4%
69	May 20, 2021	17.6%	15.1%	19.5%
70	May 21, 2021	15.2%	13.2%	17.8%
71	May 24, 2021	16.3%	13.5%	19.4%
72	May 25, 2021	16.1%	13.1%	17.8%
73	May 26, 2021	16.2%	14.4%	18.0%
74	May 27, 2021 (Note: On May 27, Miss Monte-Cristo aired earlier at 19:10 to 19:50 (KST) to make way for KBS2's live broadcast of the 2021 Volleyball Nations League' (VNL) game between Korea and Japan at 19:50 (KST). This caused Miss Monte-Cristo to go up against MBC's daily soap opera A Good Supper, which drew a higher rating of 5.9%.)	5.5%	4.8%	5.7%
75	May 28, 2021	15.4%	13.6%	17.8%
76	May 31, 2021	15.9%	13.6%	17.2%
77	June 1, 2021	17.0%	14.9%	18.1%
78	June 2, 2021	16.7%	14.7%	16.8%
79	June 3, 2021	16.4%	14.0%	17.9%
80	June 4, 2021	15.3%	13.6%	16.0%
81	June 7, 2021	16.1%	13.8%	17.7%
82	June 8, 2021	15.6%	14.0%	18.8%
83	June 9, 2021	15.2%	13.3%	16.8%
84	June 10, 2021	16.4%	13.7%	17.3%
85	June 11, 2021	14.4%	12.2%	17.9%
86	June 14, 2021	15.9%	14.4%	17.9%
87	June 15, 2021	15.4%	12.7%	17.4%
88	June 16, 2021	15.6%	13.6%	16.5%
89	June 17, 2021	16.2%	13.8%	16.7%
90	June 18, 2021	15.8%	14.1%	15.2%
91	June 21, 2021	16.4%	14.0%	16.7%
92	June 22, 2021	16.6%	13.8%	17.4%
93	June 23, 2021	16.7%	14.0%	17.1%
94	June 24, 2021	16.4%	14.2%	17.1%
95	June 25, 2021	16.7%	14.2%	16.2%
96	June 28, 2021	16.3%	13.6%	17.2%
97	June 29, 2021	17.6%	15.0%	17.9%
98	June 30, 2021	16.1%	13.5%	17.0%
99	July 1, 2021	16.3%	13.9%	17.2%
100	July 2, 2021	15.9%	13.7%	16.6%
Average		15.62%	13.40%	17.41%
In this table, the blue numbers represent the lowest ratings and the red numbers represent the highest ratings.; N/A denotes that the rating is not known.

== Awards and nominations ==
Year	Award	Category	Recipient	Result	Ref.
2021	KBS Drama Awards	Excellence Award, Actress in a Daily Drama	Lee So-yeon	Nominated	
2021	KBS Drama Awards	Excellence Award, Actor in a Daily Drama	Kyung Sung-hwan	Nominated	
