= The Birth of a Family =

2012 South Korean television series

- Promotional poster
- Also known as: Family Ties
- Genre: Romance, Melodrama, Family
- Written by: Kim Young-in (Ep.1~62); Kim Soon-ok (Ep.63~115)
- Directed by: Go Heung-sik; Oh Chung-hwan
- Starring: Lee So-yeon; Lee Kyu-han; Lee Chae-young
- Country of origin: South Korea
- Original language: Korean
- No. of episodes: 115

Production
- Production location: South Korea
- Running time: Mondays to Fridays at 19:20 (KST)
- Production company: Hwa&Dam Pictures

Original release
- Network: SBSTV
- Release: 5 December 2012 – 17 May 2013

The Birth of a Family (Korean: 가족의 탄생; RR: Gajogui tansaeng) is a 2012 South Korean daily drama about an adopted woman who struggles to make a family. It starred Lee So-yeon, Lee Kyu-han and Lee Chae-young. The daily drama aired on SBS TV on Mondays to Fridays at 19:20 from December 5, 2012, to May 17, 2013, for 115 episodes.

== Plot ==
This story revolves around a girl named Lee Soo-jung (Lee So-yeon)who was adopted and raised by her adoptive parents, Park Geum-ok (Moon Hee-kyung) and her father Lee Kyung-tae (Son Byong-ho) and her brother Lee Soo-ho (Kim Jin-woo). Lee Soo-jung is often in a bad relationship with Ma Ye-ri.

== Cast ==
- Lee So-yeon as Lee Soo-jung
- Lee Kyu-han as Kang Yoon-jae
- Lee Chae-young as Ma Ye-ri
  - Jo Yun-seo as young Ye-ri
- Moon Hee-kyung as Park Geum-ok
- Kim Jin-woo as Lee Soo-ho
  - Seo Hyun-seok as young Soo-ho
- Son Byong-ho as Lee Kyung-tae
- Jung Kyung-soon as Park Young-ok
- Na Young-hee as Jang Mi-hee
- Im Chae-moo as Ma Jin-chul
- Jang Young-nam as Ma Jin-hee
- Jung Kyu-soo as Kang Dae-jin
- Yang Hee-kyung as Oh Young-ja
- Kim Seung-hwan as Choi In-woo
- Sung Hoon as Han Ji-hoon
- Ryu Hye-rin as Baek Ji-won
- Lee Mal-geum as Eun-ah

== See also ==
- Seoul Broadcasting System
