= Kim Ae-ran (actress) =

South Korean actress (born 1971)

- Born: 15 August 1971 (age 55); Seoul, South Korea
- Other name: Kim Ai-ran
- Education: Dongguk University (Department of Theater and Film Master's Course Completion)
- Occupation: Actress
- Years active: 1996–present
- Known for: Jang Yeong-sil; Miss Monte-Cristo; Joseon Attorney
- Spouse: Jung-hoon
- Children: 1

Korean name
- Hangul: 김애란
- RR: Gim Aeran
- MR: Kim Aeran

Kim Ae-ran (Korean: 김애란; born 15 August 1971) is a South Korean actress. She is known for her roles in dramas such as Three Brothers, Jang Yeong-sil, Miss Monte-Cristo and Joseon Attorney.

== Personal life ==
Kim Ae-ran married Jung-hoon in 2001 and has one child.

== Filmography ==
=== Television series ===
Year	Title	Role	Ref.
1998	Eun Ah's Garden	Hyo-na	
1999	The Clinic for Married Couples: Love and War	Ahn Jung-hui	
2001	Orient Theatre	Ji Kyung-soon	
2001	KBS TV Novel: "Stepmother"	Ji-sook	
2002	Girl School	Teacher Han	
2003	Age of Warriors	Lady Park	
2004	Forbidden Love	Lee Su-ri	
2007	First Wives' Club	President Joo	
2009	Three Brothers	Tae Yeon-hee	
2012	KBS Drama Special: "SOS - Save Our School"	Han Seon-sook	
2016	Jang Yeong-sil	Eun-wol	
2018	Marry Me Now	Kim Young-shik's wife	
2021	Miss Monte-Cristo	Park Bong-sook	
2023	Joseon Attorney	Grand Queen Dowager Jaseong	

=== Film ===
Year	Title	Role	Ref.
2000	Libera Me	Seon-ah	

== Awards and nominations ==
Name of the award ceremony, year presented, category, nominee of the award, and the result of the nomination
Award ceremony	Year	Category	Nominee / Work	Result	Ref.
KBS Talent Awards	1996	Public Recruitment Talent	—N/a	Won	
