= Kim Jung-hwa =

South Korean actress (born 1983)

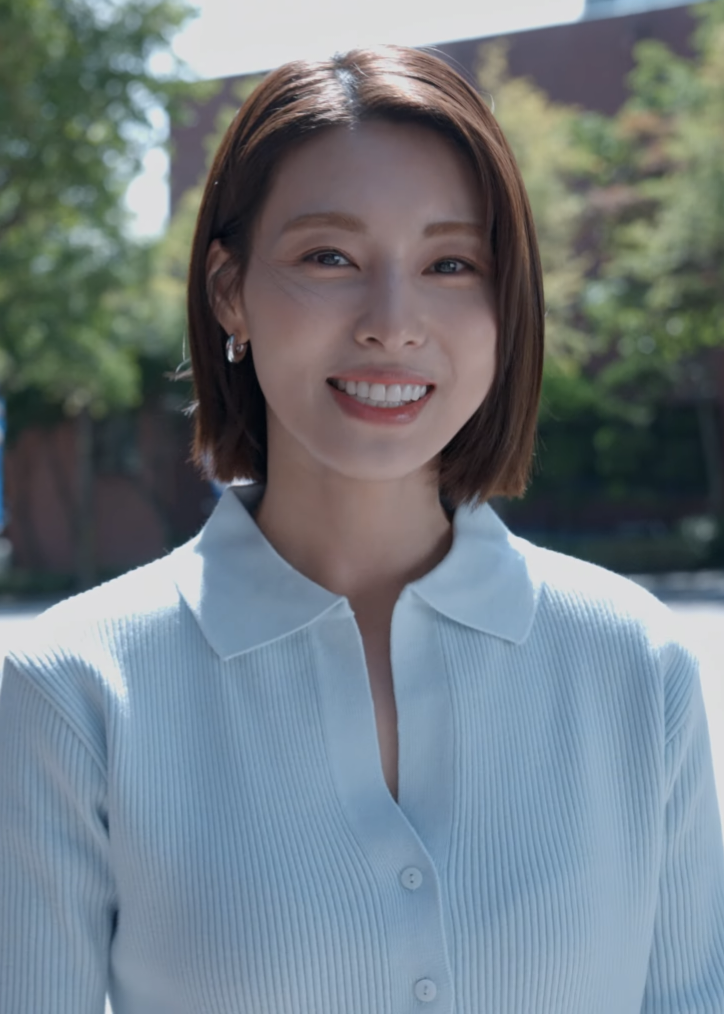
- Kim in March 2023
- Born: September 9, 1983 (age 43); Seoul, South Korea
- Education: Dongduk Women's University - Broadcasting and Entertainment
- Occupation: Actress
- Years active: 2000–present
- Agent: Kenneth Company
- Spouse: Yoo Eun-sung (m. 2013)
- Children: 2

Korean name
- Hangul: 김정화
- Hanja: 金晶和
- RR: Gim Jeonghwa
- MR: Kim Chŏnghwa

Kim Jung-hwa (Korean: 김정화; born September 9, 1983) is a South Korean actress. She rose to fame in the 2002 sitcom Nonstop 3, and has since played leading roles in the television series Something About 1% (2003) and Snow White: Taste Sweet Love (2004), as well as the films Spy Girl (2004) and The Elephant on the Bike (2007).

== Career ==
Kim Jung-hwa made her acting debut in 2000 when she appeared in Lee Seung-hwan's music video "You to You." She rose to fame in 2002 with the sitcom Nonstop 3, and was soon cast in supporting roles in the television dramas Glass Slippers (2002) and Into the Sun (2003).

Kim starred as the leading actress in the romantic comedies Something About 1% (2003) in which she played a middle school teacher who enters a contract marriage with a tycoon's grandson, and Snow White: Taste Sweet Love (2004) where her homely character is unexpectedly caught in a love triangle between two brothers. This was followed by her first film Spy Girl (2004), a comedy about a North Korean agent who goes undercover in the South as a Burger King employee, but to her dismay finds herself becoming popular with the male student customers.

Kim made her stage debut in 2006, in the Russian plays Uncle Vanya by Anton Chekhov and The Lower Depths by Maxim Gorky. She later starred in the homegrown musical Audition (2007), Sam Shepard's Fool for Love (2010), and the Kim Kwang-seok jukebox musical The Days (2013).

Her next major film role was in 2007's The Elephant on the Bike, as the love interest of an emotionally withdrawn zookeeper with a deformed hand. She then drew positive reviews for her portrayal of a cold-hearted loan shark heiress in the hit drama War of Money.

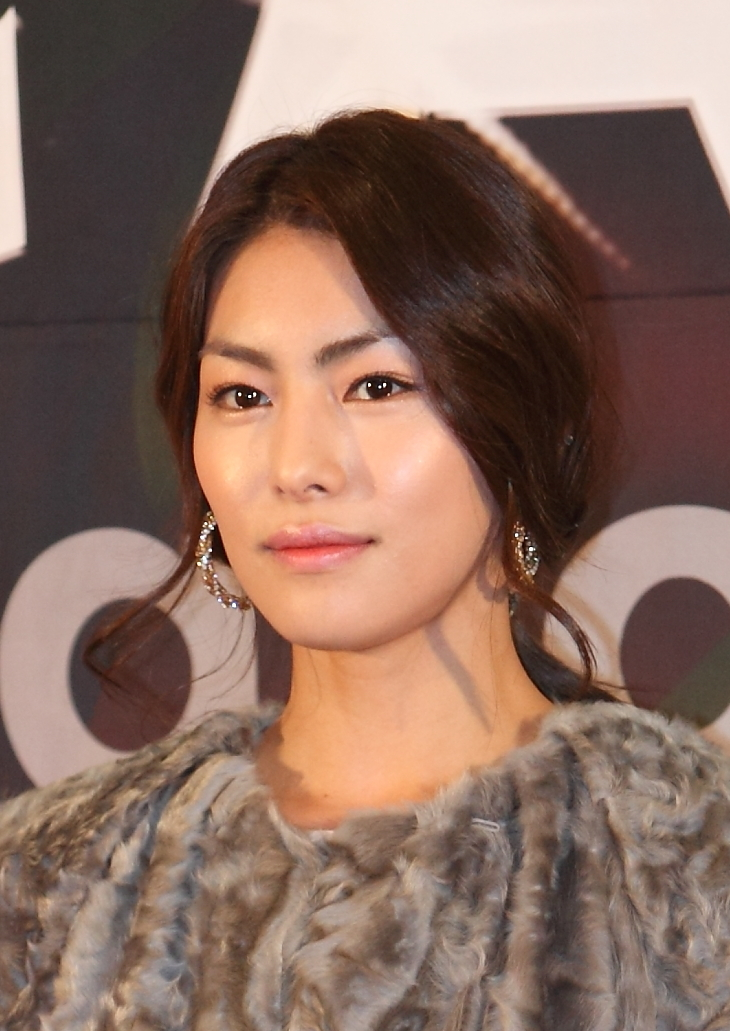
Kim in 2010

Kim continued to appear in television, notably in four-episode anthology Things We Do That We Know We Will Regret (2008), and historical dramas The Kingdom of the Winds (2009) and Gwanggaeto, The Great Conqueror (2011). In 2012, Kim starred in Solid but Fluid (titled "Silverscreen Lovers" in Korean), a 3D short film about a soon-to-be-married couple that catches a glimpse of their future while at the drive-in theater.

Kim published a book of essays in 2012, which included her musings on life as an actress, as well as stories about her volunteer work helping impoverished children as part of the fight against global hunger. She titled it Hello, Agnes!, after the African child with HIV/AIDS whom she met in Uganda and has sponsored since 2009. Kim donated all proceeds to charity.

After a supporting role in Dating Agency: Cyrano (2013), Kim returned to cable television in 2015 in the disaster/medical drama D-Day.

== Personal life ==
Kim married contemporary Christian music composer and missionary Yoo Eun-sung on August 24, 2013. They first met when both became goodwill ambassadors for the humanitarian organization Food for the Hungry International, and grew close when Yoo composed the music while Kim wrote the lyrics for the single "Hello, Agnes!" which accompanied the release of Kim's same-titled memoir.

She gave birth to their first child, son Yoo Hwa on June 14, 2014 in Atlanta, Georgia.

== Filmography ==
=== Television series ===
Year	Title	Role
2000–2002	New Nonstop	Kim Jung-hwa
2002	Glass Slippers	Park Yeon-woong
2002–2003	Nonstop 3	Kim Jung-hwa
2003	Into the Sun	Kang Soo-jin
2003	Something About 1%	Kim Da-hyun
2004	Nonstop 4	Part-time employee at fast food chain (cameo, ep 78)
2004	Snow White: Taste Sweet Love	Ma Young-hee
2004	Drama City: "Massage"	Eun Hee-sung
2004	Span Drama: "A Very Special Flavored Lemonade"	Woman reading a book
2005	Three-Leaf Clover	Park Yeon-hee
2007	War of Money	Lee Cha-yeon
2007	The Devil That Pours Red Wine	Min Soo-yeon
2008	Before and After: Plastic Surgery Clinic	TV reporter (cameo, ep 1)
2008	Things We Do That We Know; We Will Regret	Kim In-ah
2008	Night After Night	Wang Joo-hyun
2008–2009	The Kingdom of the Winds	Princess Yi-ji
2009	Good Job, Good Job	Na Mi-ra
2010	Life Is Beautiful	Woo Geum-ji
2011–2012	Gwanggaeto, The Great Conqueror	Seol Ji
2012	Ugly Cake	Kim Joo-hee
2013	She is Wow!	Actress (cameo, episode 3)
2013	Dating Agency: Cyrano	Yoon Yi-seol
2015	D-Day	Eun So-yul
2017	Children of the 20th Century	Sa Ho-sung
2018	Dear My Room	Shim Eun-jung
2019	Confession	Jenny Song
2019	Hot Stove League	Yoo Jeong-in
2020	Eccentric! Chef Moon	Yoo Hyo-myung
2020	Oh My Baby	Jung In-ah
2020	Wechul	Oh Min-ju
2021	Mine	Suzy Choi
2022	Good Job	Seon-woo's mother (Cameo)

=== Films ===
Year	Title	Role
2004	Spy Girl	Park Hyo-jin/Rim Kye-soon
2006	No Regret	Shim Hyun-woo (cameo)
2007	The Elephant on the Bike	Ji Ha-kyung
2008	Dooly and Me (short film)	Soon-ok
2010	Tokyo Taxi	Flight attendant (cameo)
2010	Read My Lips	Jung-hwa
2010	Star of Hope: Ikhwezi Le Themba	Documentary narrator
2012	Solid but Fluid (3D short film)	Jin-young
2016	Seondal: The Man Who Sells the River	
2018	Detective K: Secret of the Living Dead	
2018	Student A	Mi-rae's mother
2020	Ensemble	Hye-young
2021	Midnight Thriller	Ra Soo-jin

=== Music video appearances ===
Year	Title	Artist
2000	"You to You"	Lee Seung-hwan
2000	"Babybaby"	MOVE
2000	"Yesterday"	Island
2001	"Christmas Wishes"	Lee Seung-hwan
2002	"In My Heart"	4U
2002	"Holding On to You"	Naul
2002	"No Matter How Much"	Naul
2002	"Fate"	Naul
2002	"I Know"	Naul
2003	"Reincarnated"	Lee Seung-hwan
2004	"No More Now"	Lee So-ra
2009	"When I Watch a Drama"	Byul
2009	"My Love"	1sagain
2012	"Hello, Agnes!"	Kim Jung-hwa

=== Variety/radio shows ===
Year	Title	Notes
2000	Music Camp	VJ
2002–2003	Inkigayo	Host
2002–2003	Music for You with Kim Jung-hwa	DJ
2010–present	Project Hope Volunteer: Donating Is Happiness	Host
2012	Just a Moment Campaign	DJ

== Stage credits ==
=== Musical ===
Musical performance(s)
Year	Title		Role	Theater	Date	Ref.
Year	English	Korean	Role	Theater	Date	Ref.
2006	The Lower Depths	밑바닥에서	Nastya	Daehakro Sangsang Nanum Theater	May 2	
2007	Audition	오디션	Kim Sun-ah	Baekham Art Hall	November 1 to December 31	
2013	Those Days	그날들	Geunyeo (her)	Daehangno Musical Center Grand Theater	April 4 – June 30	
2013	Those Days	그날들	Geunyeo (her)	Daejeon Arts Center Art Hall	July 5–7	
2013	Those Days	그날들	Geunyeo (her)	Daegu Keimyung Art Center	July 19–21	

=== Theater ===
Theater performance(s)
Year	Title		Role	Theater	Date	Ref.
Year	English	Korean	Role	Theater	Date	Ref.
2006	Uncle Vanya	바냐 아저씨	Yelena Andreyevna Serebryakov	Daehakro Small Theater Festival in Seoul	March 6 to 7	
2010	Fool for Love	풀 포 러브	May	SM Art Hall in Seoul	July 6	
2010	Fool for Love	풀 포 러브	May	MBC Lotte Art Hall in Busan	October 16–17	
2010	Fool for Love	풀 포 러브	May	Donggu Arts & Sports Center in Daegu	October 23–24	

== Discography ==
=== Singles ===
Year	Song title	Notes
2008	"Guidelines for Ex-lovers"	Track from Audition cast recording
2012	"Hello, Agnes!"	Single

== Bibliography ==
Year	Title	Publisher	ISBN
2012	Hello, Agnes!	Paper Book	ISBN 9788997148233

== Awards and nominations ==
Year	Award	Category	Nominated work	Result
2002	MBC Entertainment Awards	Top Excellence Award, Actress in a Sitcom	Nonstop 3	Nominated
2002	SBS Drama Awards	New Star Award	Glass Slippers	Won
2003	39th Baeksang Arts Awards	Best New Actress (TV)	Nonstop 3	Nominated
2003	SBS Drama Awards	Best Supporting Actress	Into the Sun	Won
2003	MBC Drama Awards	Best New Actress	Something About 1%	Nominated
2004	KBS Drama Awards	Best Actress in a One-Act/Special/Short Drama	Massage	Nominated
2007	SBS Drama Awards	Best Supporting Actress in a Miniseries	War of Money	Nominated
2008	KBS Drama Awards	Best Actress in a One-Act/Special/Short Drama	Things We Do That We Know We Will Regret	Nominated
2008	KBS Drama Awards	Best Couple Award with Song Il-gook	The Kingdom of the Winds	Nominated
