= Kam Woo-sung =

South Korean actor

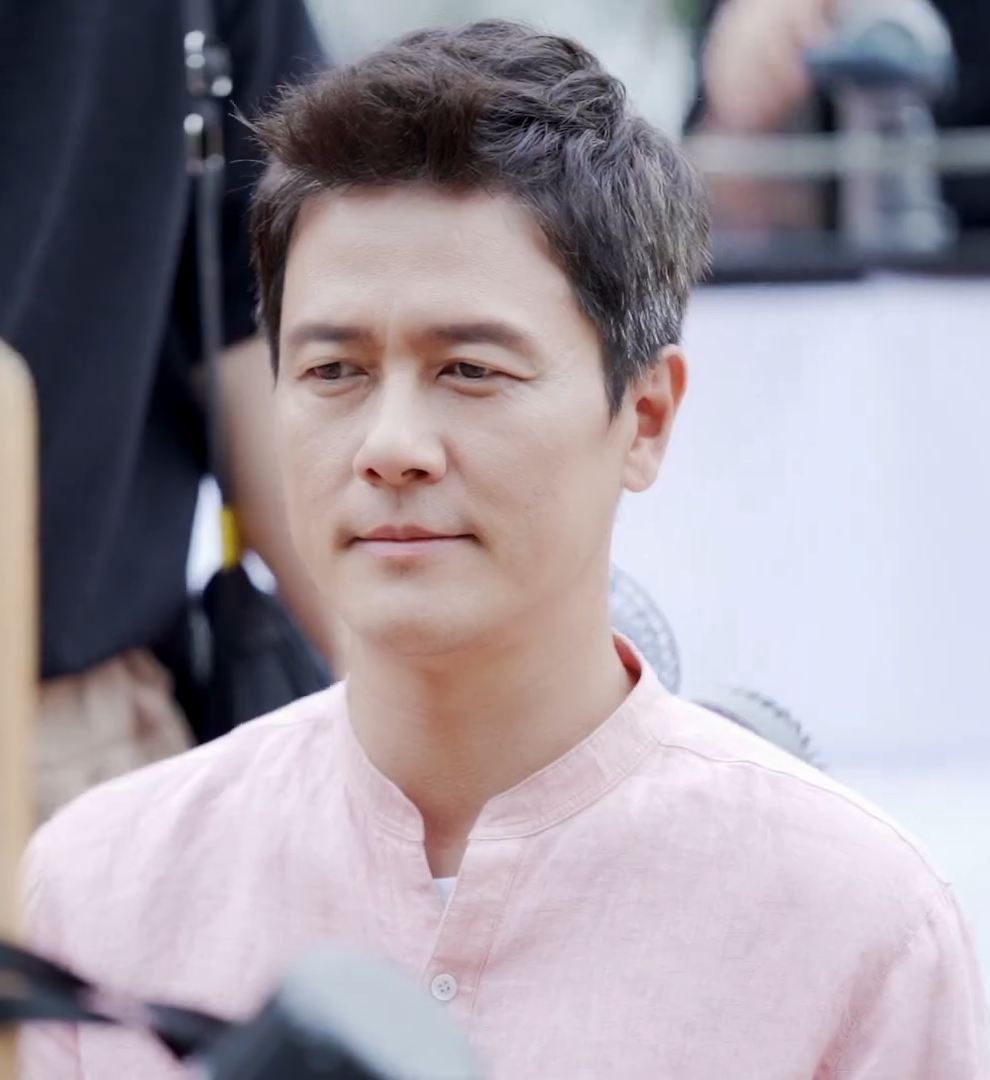
- Kam in 2019
- Born: October 1, 1970 (age 56); Okcheon County, North Chungcheong Province, South Korea
- Other names: Gam Woo-sung; Gam Wu-seong; Kam Woo-seong; Karm Woo-sung
- Education: Seoul National University – Oriental Painting
- Occupation: Actor
- Years active: 1991–present
- Agent: Bright Entertainment
- Spouse: Kang Min-young (m. 2006)

Korean name
- Hangul: 감우성
- Hanja: 甘宇成
- RR: Gam Useong
- MR: Kam Usŏng

Kam Woo-sung (born October 1, 1970) is a South Korean actor. He is best known for his portrayal of a court jester serving a despotic king in the hit period film The King and the Clown.

== Career ==
Kam Woo-sung majored in Oriental painting at the Seoul National University, then made his acting debut in the 1991 television drama Our Paradise. Through his roles on TV in the following decade, Kam became known for playing gentle and intellectual upper-middle-class men, notably in Hyun-jung, I Love You. Then in 2002, he successfully subverted this image in his first film, the critically acclaimed Marriage Is a Crazy Thing, in which he played a commitment-phobic professor having a passionate affair.

More characters followed in a variety of genres: a man trapped in a confusing and haunting sequence of events in Song Il-gon's mystery film Spider Forest; the PTSD-afflicted leader of a South Korean squadron in Vietnam who looks into the mysterious disappearance of 18 soldiers in the horror thriller R-Point; and a son struggling to fake Korea's reunification to fulfill an ailing father's wish in the comedy A Bold Family.

In late 2005, Kam reached a turning point in his 15-year career when he starred in The King and the Clown. Jang Hyuk was originally cast in the leading role of a court jester during the reign of Joseon dynasty tyrant King Yeonsan, but after Jang was implicated in a draft-dodging scandal, Kam was brought in to replace him. He trained extensively over two months in the art of Korean traditional performance, including street opera, and acrobatic, rope and mask dances. The low-budget film unexpectedly broke box office records to become (at the time) the highest grossing Korean film of all time. Critics praised Kam's "powerful energy and wit," and his performance garnered acting recognition, including Best Actor at the 2006 Grand Bell Awards.

He returned to television in Alone in Love (2006), which was lauded for its realistic portrayal of a divorced couple. Back on the big screen, Kam reunited with previous A Bold Family costar (and close friend in real life) Kim Soo-ro in Big Bang (2007), followed by the ensemble romantic comedy My Love and crime thriller The Outlaw (2010). Kam was listed as one of the highest paid entertainers on the KBS network in 2011, earning ₩440 million for playing Geunchogo of Baekje in the 60-episode series The King of Legend.

Though appearing less frequently in projects, Kam has starred in melodramas My Spring Days (2014), Should We Kiss First? (2018) and The Wind Blows (2019) in recent years.

== Personal life ==
After dating for 15 years, Kam married actress Kang Min-young in Australia in 2006.

== Discography ==
=== Soundtrack appearances ===
Title	Year	Album
"I Will"	2014	My Spring Days OST

== Filmography ==
=== Film ===
Year	Title	Role
2002	Marriage Is a Crazy Thing	Kim Jun-Yeong
2004	R-Point	Choi Tae-In
2004	Spider Forest	Kang Min
2005	A Bold Family	Kim Myung-Seok
2005	The King and the Clown	Jang-Saeng
2007	Big Bang	Park Man-Su
2007	My Love	Jang Se-Jin
2010	The Outlaw	Oh Jeong-Su

=== Television series ===
Year	Title	Role	Notes/Ref.
1991	Our Paradise	Art student	
1991	Woohwangcheongsimhwan	Hyun	MBC Best Theater
1992	A Story of Long Distance Couple	Choi Wang-jae	MBC Best Theater
1992	Investigation of Memory	Choi Jong-gwan	MBC Best Theater
1992	Enchantment	Cho Hoon-bae	
1993	At Our Last Winter	Geon-woo	MBC Best Theater
1993	Trumpet Flower	Chae I-eon	
1993	Stormy Season	Choi Han-yeong	
1993	Women's Generation	Kim Hyun-seok	MBC Best Theater
1993	A Tale of Childhood	Yong-sik	MBC Best Theater
1993	Jeremy	Jeremy	MBC Best Theater
1994	The White Journey	Cho Seong-gyu	MBC Best Theater
1994	A Verse of Sad Father	Cha Dong-hwa	Special drama
1995	A Three-color Friendship	Tae-hyung	Special drama
1995	To Make a Man	Meong Tae-min	
1997	The Mountain	Choi Seong-gyu	
1997	Instinct	Lee Jun-seob	
1998	Shy Lovers	Choi Myung-il	
1998	Song of the Wind	Song In-gyu	
1999	Michiko	Han Dong-wook	Special drama
1999	I'm Still Loving You	Kim Hyung-jun	
2000	Say It with Your Eyes	Jang Ki-woong	
2000	Medical Center	Kim Seung-jae	
2001	Stars Rise Even in the Day	Gab-soo	Special drama
2002	Hyun-jung, I Love You	Kim Beom-soo	
2006	Alone in Love	Lee Dong-jin	
2010	The King of Legend	King Geunchogo	
2014	My Spring Days	Kang Dong-ha	
2018	Should We Kiss First?	Son Mu-han	
2019	The Wind Blows	Do Dae-cheol	
2021	Joseon Exorcist (Note: cancels complete broadcast of show due to history distortion and Chinese style props. The show faced a massive amount of criticism leading to sponsorships and advertisements pulling out.)	Kim Tae-jong	

== Awards ==
Year	Ceremony	Awards	Works
1999	MBC Drama Awards	Popularity Award	I'm Still Loving You
1999	MBC Drama Awards	Best couple Award (with Chae-Lim)	I'm Still Loving You
2002	Grimae Awards	Best Actor	Hyun-jung, I Love You
2002	MBC Drama Awards	Top Excellence Award (Actor in a Miniseries)	Hyun-jung, I Love You
2002	Women Viewers Film Awards	Best Actor	Marriage is a Crazy Thing
2002	Korean Film Awards	Best New Actor	Marriage is a Crazy Thing
2002	Korea Best Dresser Swan Award	Swan Award (Actor in Film)	Marriage is a Crazy Thing
2004	Women Viewers Film Awards	Most Hopeful Actor Award	Spider Forest
2006	Grand Bell Awards	Best Actor	King and the Clown
2006	Chunsa Film Art Awards	Best Actor	King and the Clown
2006	Blue Dragon Awards	Best Couple Award (with Lee Joon-Ki)	King and the Clown
2008	National Tax Service	Prime Minister Commendation	
2018	Ministry of Health and Welfare	Minister Commendation	
2018	Korea Broadcasting Awards	Best Actor	Should We Kiss First?
2018	Korea Drama Awards	Top Excellence Award	Should We Kiss First?
2018	SBS Drama Awards	Grand Prize (Daesang)	Should We Kiss First?
2018	SBS Drama Awards	Best Couple	Should We Kiss First?
