= Love Is a Crazy Thing =

Love is a Crazy Thing
- Directed by: Oh Seok-geun
- Starring: Jeon Mi-seon; Jang Hyun-sung
- Release date: 9 December 2005
- Running time: 100 minutes
- Country: Republic of Korea
- Language: Korean

Love is a Crazy Thing is a 2005 South Korean film. Mismarketed as a romantic comedy, the film follows the journey of a downtrodden woman with an incompetent husband, two young sons and a load of debt into the world of Korean norebangs.

== See also ==
- List of Korean-language films
