= My Right to Ravage Myself =

- Theatrical poster
- Hangul: 나는 나를 파괴할 권리가 있다
- Hanja: 나는 나를 破壞할 權利가 있다
- RR: Naneun nareul pagoehal gwolliga itda
- MR: Nanŭn narŭl p'agoehal kwŏlliga itta
- Directed by: Jeon Soo-il
- Written by: Jeon Soo-il
- Based on: I Have the Right to Destroy Myself by Kim Young-ha
- Produced by: Cho In-sook
- Starring: Jeong Bo-seok; Chu Sang-mi; Jang Hyun-sung
- Cinematography: Kim Sung-tae
- Music by: Kim Seong-soo
- Release date: April 15, 2005
- Running time: 93 minutes
- Country: South Korea
- Language: Korean
- Budget: US$1,150,000

My Right to Ravage Myself (Korean: 나는 나를 파괴할 권리가 있다) is a 2005 South Korean film based on the 1996 novel by Kim Young-ha. It was controversial for its sex scenes and edgy theme of suicide. It was selected to appear in the 7th annual Pusan International Film Festival in 2003 and the 2004 Fribourg International Film Festival.

== Plot ==
The film follows a young man who makes a living by helping people commit the perfect suicide. After one woman's suicide, her boyfriend investigates the incident and discovers the man who is helping others with their suicides.
