= Jang Hyun-sung =

South Korean actor (born 1970)

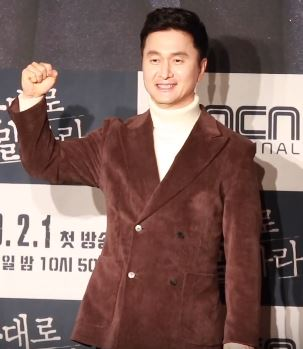
- Jang in January 2020
- Born: July 17, 1970 (age 56); Geoje, South Gyeongsang, South Korea
- Education: Seoul Institute of the Arts – Theater
- Occupation: Actor
- Years active: 1997–present
- Agent: YG Entertainment
- Spouse: Yang Hee-jung
- Children: 2

Korean name
- Hangul: 장현성
- Hanja: 張鉉誠
- RR: Jang Hyeonseong
- MR: Chang Hyŏnsŏng

Jang Hyun-sung (Korean: 장현성; born July 17, 1970) is a South Korean actor. He started his acting career as a member of the Hakjeon Theatre Company, before transitioning to film and television. Jang is best known for starring in director Song Il-gon's arthouse films such as Spider Forest (2004) and The Magicians (2006), and most notably Feathers in the Wind (2005), for which one review praised him for giving "the performance of his career." He also had major roles in Nabi (The Butterfly) (2001), Rewind (also known as A Man Watching Video, 2003), My Right to Ravage Myself (2005), Love Is a Crazy Thing (2005), and My Friend and His Wife (2008). Aside from acting, Jang was one of the screenwriters for the Moon Seung-wook film Romance (2006).

In 2013, Jang and his two sons began appearing in the reality/variety show The Return of Superman (also known as Superman is Back), in which celebrity fathers babysit their children by themselves for 48 hours after sending their wives on a 2-day vacation.

== Filmography ==
=== Film ===
Year	Title	Role
2023	Single in Seoul	President of the publishing company
2023	Rebound	Yongsan High School Coach
2023	Kill Boksoon	Gill Bok-soon's father
2022	My Son	Min-seok
2020	The Swordsman	King Gwanghae
2017	Steel Rain	Jung Se-young
2016	Curtain Call	Min-ki
2015	The Advocate: A Missing Body	CEO Moon Ji-hoon
2015	Love Never Fails	Sang-hyun
2015	C'est Si Bon	Lee Jang-hee
2013	Hwayi: A Monster Boy	Jin-sung
2011	Always	credited for original idea
2011	Painkiller (short film	voice
2009	Dance of Time	documentary narrator
2008	My Friend and His Wife	Ye-joon
2007	Femme Fatale	
2007	The Perfect Couple	cameo
2006	Maundy Thursday	Yoo-chan
2006	Romance	also credited as screenwriter
2006	The Magicians	
2005	Love Is a Crazy Thing	Min-su
2005	Princess Aurora	Kim Woo-tae
2005	Never to Lose	cameo
2005	My Right to Ravage Myself	Sang Hyun
2005	Feathers in the Wind	Jang Hyun-sung
2004	Springtime	Kyung Su
2004	Ghost House	Park Gi-tae
2004	Spider Forest	Choi Sung-hyun
2003	The Legend of the Evil Lake	
2003	Rewind	
2003	Spring Breeze	
2002	Break Out	
2002	Survival Game	
2001	Nabi	K
2001	Kiss Me Much	
2000	Real Fiction	
1999	Shiri	
1997	The Story of an Unemployed Man	

=== Television series ===
Year	Title	Role	Ref.
2025	The Art of Negotiation	Ha Tae-soo	
2024	Flex X Cop	Jin Myeong-chul	
2023	Agency	Yoo Jung-seok	
2022	Revenge of Others	Gi Wang-do	
2022	Under the Queen's Umbrella	Yoon Soo-kwang	
2022	Poong, the Joseon Psychiatrist	Yoo Hu-myeong (Cameo, Ep. 1)	
2022	Money Heist: Korea – Joint Economic Area	Kim Sang-man	
2021	The One and Only	Pyo Kang-seon	
2021	Melancholia	Sung Min-joon	
2021	Lovers of the Red Sky	Han Geon	
2020	Alice	Professor Jang Dong-shik (Cameo, Ep. 1)	
2020	Sweet Munchies	Kang In-shik	
2020	Tell Me What You Saw	Choi Hyung-pil	
2019	VIP	Jang Jin-chul	
2019	The Running Mates: Human Rights	Kim Hyun-suk	
2019	Angel's Last Mission: Love	Cho Seung-wan	
2019	Doctor Prisoner	Prosecutor Jung Wi-shik	
2018	Just Dance	Kwon Dong-suk	
2018	The Hymn of Death	Lee Yong-moon	
2018	Where Stars Land	Kwon Hee-seung	
2018	Twelve Nights	Lee Baek-man	
2018	Live	Eun Kyung-mo	
2017	Temperature of Love	guest appearance, ep 2	
2017	While You Were Sleeping	Jung Il-seung	
2017	Queen for Seven Days	Shin Soo-geun	
2017	Man to Man	Jang Tae-ho	
2016	Woman with a Suitcase	Lee Dong-soo	
2016	Dear My Friends	Il-woo	
2016	The Doctors	Kim Tae-ho	
2016	Signal	Kim Bum-joo	
2015	Assembly	Baek Do-hyun	
2015	Heard It Through the Grapevine	Seo Hyeong-sik	
2014	Punch	Jang Min-seok	
2014	Secret Door	Hong Gye-hee	
2014	Secret Affair	Kim In-gyeom (cameo, ep 15-16)	
2014	Three Days	Ham Bong-soo	
2013	Who Are You?	Psychiatrist Park Hyung-jin (cameo, ep 1-2)	
2013	Goddess of Marriage	No Seung-soo	
2013	The End of the World	Yoon Kyu-jin	
2012	Vampire Prosecutor 2	Jang Chul-oh (guest appearance, ep 10)	
2012	The King of Dramas	Kenji Watanabe	
2012	Five Fingers	Choi Seung-jae	
2012	Big	Kang Hyuk-soo	
2012	Phantom	Jeon Jae-wook	
2012	How Long I've Kissed	Han Sang-jin	
2012	History of a Salaryman	Choi Hang-ryang	
2011	Drama Special: For My Son	Tae-soo	
2011	A Thousand Days' Promise	Seo-yeon's doctor	
2011	Vampire Prosecutor	Jang Chul-oh	
2011	Sign	Jang Min-suk	
2010	Drama Special Series: Rock, Rock, Rock		
2010	Pure Pumpkin Flower	Hyun-mook	
2010	Grudge: The Revolt of Gumiho		
2010	Jejungwon	Min Young-ik	
2009	Son of Man		
2009	Love and Obsession		
2008	Glass Castle	Kim Gyu-sung	
2008	The Scale of Providence		
2007	New Heart	Kim Tae-joon	
2007	Daughters-in-Law		
2007	Conspiracy in the Court		
2007	The Great Catsby		
2007	Drama City: Aperture		
2007	Behind the White Tower		
2006	My Love		
2006	The Origin of Tears		
2006	Great Inheritance		
2005	Drama City: Who Murdered Kurt Cobain?		
2005	Drama City: Leslie Cheung Is Dead?		
2005	The Hard Goodbye		
2004	Precious Family		
2004	Terms of Endearment		
2004	Drama City: Flower Pinned on the Tip of a Knife		
2003	Rosemary		

=== Variety shows ===
Year	Title	Notes/Ref.
2013–2014	The Return of Superman	with sons Jang Jun-woo and Jang Jun-seo
2021	The Story of the Day Biting the Tail 3	Host
2022	Hot Singers	Cast Member

=== Radio shows ===
Year	Title	Role	Notes	Ref.
2022	To the Beautiful You	Special DJ	February 21	

=== Hosting ===
Year	Title	Role	Notes	Ref.
2022	23rd Jeonju International Film Festival	Host of the opening ceremony	with Yoo In-na	

== Theater ==
Year	English title	Korean title	Role	Ref.
2022	Love Letter	러브레터	Andy	

== Ambassadorship ==
- Ambassador of the Seoul International Environmental Film Festival (2022)

== Awards ==
- 2019 KBS Drama Awards: Best Couple Award with Kim Jung-nan (Doctor Prisoner)
- 2016 Korea Drama Awards: Top Excellence Award, Actor (Doctors)
- 2015 SBS Drama Awards: Special Award, Actor in a Drama (Heard It Through the Grapevine)
- 2013 SBS Drama Awards: Special Award, Actor in a Weekend Drama (Goddess of Marriage)
- 2007 KBS Drama Awards: Excellence Award, Actor in a Serial Drama (The Golden Era of Daughters-in-Law)
- 2005 KBS Drama Awards: Best Actor in a One-Act/Special Drama (Leslie Cheung Is Dead?)
