= Jeon Mi-seon =

South Korean actress (1970–2019)

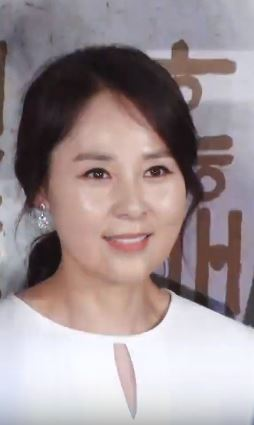
- Jeon in 2019
- Born: December 7, 1970; Seoul, South Korea
- Died: June 29, 2019 (aged 48); Jeonju, South Korea
- Education: Seoul Institute of the Arts
- Occupation: Actress
- Years active: 1986–2019
- Agent(s): Lejel E&M
- Spouse: Park Sang-hoon
- Children: 1

Korean name
- Hangul: 전미선
- Hanja: 全美善
- RR: Jeon Miseon
- MR: Chŏn Misŏn

Jeon Mi-seon (December 7, 1970 – June 29, 2019) was a South Korean actress. Though best known as a supporting actress in films and television series such as Memories of Murder (2003), Moon Embracing the Sun (2012), and Hide and Seek (2013), Jeon Mi-seon also played the leading role in Love Is a Crazy Thing (2005).

== Death ==
Jeon was found dead at a hotel in Jeonju on June 29, 2019, in what police have described as a likely suicide. She was 48.

== Filmography ==
=== Film ===
Year	Title	Role
1990	Well, Let's Look at the Sky Sometimes	Eun-kyung
1991	Theresa's Lover	Jin-hee
1993	No Emergency Exit	Eun-ji
1994	Sado Sade Impotence	Young-mi
1994	The Young Man	Jin-yi
1998	Christmas in August	Ji-won
2001	Bungee Jumping of Their Own	Seo In-woo's wife
2003	Memories of Murder	Kwak Seol-young
2004	A Wacky Switch	Lee Dong-hwa's ex-wife
2005	Love Is a Crazy Thing	Eo-jin
2006	Mission Sex Control	Soon-yi
2008	BA:BO	Seung-ryong's mother
2009	City of Damnation	Park Jong-ki's wife
2009	On Next Sunday	Choi So-ra's mother
2009	Mother	Mi-seon
2009	The Executioner	Yoon-sun
2010	Wedding Dress	Ji-hye
2010	Bread, Love and Dreams	Kim Mi-sun
2011	Funny Neighbors	Jo Mi-ra
2011	A Piano on the Sea	
2013	Hide and Seek	Min-ji
2016	The Last Ride	Go-hwan's Mother
2017	My Last Love	Hwa-yeon
2019	The King's Letters	Queen Sohun

=== Television series ===
Year	Title	Role
1986	MBC Best Theater: "What Is Santa Claus?"	
1988	Land	Lee Bong-soon
1988	Encounter	
1989	Country Diaries (until 2002)	Sook-yi
1990	Years of Ambition	
1991	West Wind	
1991	Eyes of Dawn	Oh Soon-ae
1992	To Give Over Campfire	Kang Soo-hee
1994	Eldest Sister	
1996	Until We Can Love	Lee Yoo-mi
1996	Drama Game: "Stronger Than Death"	Mo-ran
1996	MBC Best Theater: "Sallie and Suzie"	Suzie
1998	MBC Best Theater: "A Society That Recommends Laxatives"	Unmarried woman
1998	Hometown Legends: "Gokseong Tomb"	
1999	MBC Best Theater: "Destiny"	Madam Kang
2000	Taejo Wang Geon	Queen Sinmyeongsunseong
2002	Miss Mermaid	Yoon Sung-mi
2002	Rustic Period	Park Gye-sook
2003	Screen	Park Joo-young
2003	Briar Flower	Kim Soo-ok
2006	Hwang Jini	Jin Hyun-geum
2006	My Love	Jang Mi-ran's coworker
2008	East of Eden	Lee Jung-ja
2009	The Accidental Couple	Cha Yun-kyung
2010	Bread, Love and Dreams	Kim Mi-sun
2011	Royal Family	Im Yoon-seo
2011	Ojakgyo Family	Kim Mi-sook
2011	Girl K	Cha In-sook
2011	Poseidon	Park Min-jung
2012	Moon Embracing the Sun	Jang Nok-young
2012	The Thousandth Man	Gu Mi-seon
2012	Five Fingers	Song Nam-joo
2013	Pure Love	Kim Sun-mi
2013	Passionate Love	Yang Eun-sook
2014	Beyond the Clouds	Baek Nan-joo
2015	More Than a Maid	Lady Yoon
2015	Who Are You: School 2015	Song Mi-kyung
2015	The Return of Hwang Geum-bok	Hwang Eun-sil
2015	Reply 1988	Adult Sung Bo-ra
2015	Six Flying Dragons	Boon-yi's Mother
2016	The Unusual Family	Shim Sun-ae
2016	Secret Healer	Ms. Son, Heo-jun's stepmother
2016	Love in the Moonlight	Lady Park
2017	Chicago Typewriter	Madam Sophia, Jeon-seol's mother
2017	The Guardians	Park Yoon-hee
2017	Andante	Shi-kyung's mother
2017	Witch at Court	Go Jae-suk
2017	Love Returns	Gil Eun-jung
2018	Tempted	Seol Young-won
2019	He Is Psychometric	Kang Eun-joo

=== Music video appearances ===
Year	Title	Artist
2006	"Let's Not Meet Again"	Jang Hye-jin
2014	"특집 - 불후의 명곡2"	Jeon Mi-seon & Son Jun-ho

== Theater ==
Year	Title	Role
2009–2014	Our Mother, 3 Days and 2 Nights	Daughter (Mi-young)
2009	No Suicides Allowed in Spring	

== Awards and nominations ==
Year	Award	Category	Nominated work	Result
1994	17th Golden Cinematography Awards	Best New Actress	Sado Sade Impotence	Won
2003	24th Blue Dragon Film Awards	Best Supporting Actress	Memories of Murder	Nominated
2006	KBS Drama Awards	Best Supporting Actress	Hwang Jini	Won
2009	KBS Drama Awards	Best Supporting Actress	The Accidental Couple	Nominated
2010	KBS Drama Awards	Best Supporting Actress	Bread, Love and Dreams	Nominated
2012	5th Korea Drama Awards	Excellence Award, Actress	Moon Embracing the Sun	Nominated
2012	1st K-Drama Star Awards	Acting Award, Actress	Moon Embracing the Sun	Nominated
2012	MBC Drama Awards	Golden Acting Award, Actress	Moon Embracing the Sun	Nominated
2012	SBS Drama Awards	Excellence Award, Actress in a Serial Drama	Five Fingers	Nominated
2013	34th Blue Dragon Film Awards	Best Supporting Actress	Hide and Seek	Nominated
2013	21st Korean Culture and Entertainment Awards	Excellence Award, Actress in Film	Hide and Seek	Won
2014	34th Golden Cinema Festival	Best Supporting Actress	Hide and Seek	Won
2015	2015 SBS Drama Awards	Special Actress (daily drama)	The Return of Hwang Geum-bok	Won
