= Lee So-yeon (actress) =

South Korean actress (born 1982)

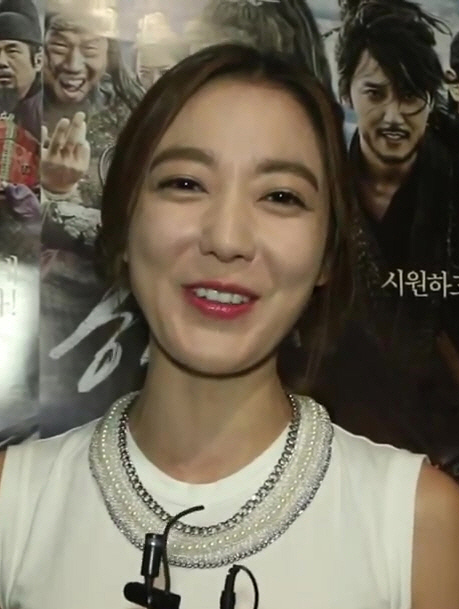
- Lee in July 2014
- Born: April 16, 1982 (age 44); Seoul, South Korea
- Education: Korea National University of Arts; Hanyang University – Theater and Film
- Occupation: Actress
- Years active: 2002–present
- Agent: Management Allum
- Spouse: Unknown (m. 2015; div. 2018)

Korean name
- Hangul: 이소연
- Hanja: 李昭娟
- RR: I Soyeon
- MR: I Soyŏn

Lee So-yeon (Korean: 이소연; born April 16, 1982) is a South Korean actress. She is best known for her roles in the films Untold Scandal (2003) and Feathers in the Wind (2004), and the television series Spring Waltz (2006), Temptation of an Angel (2009) and Dong Yi (2010).

== Career ==
Lee So-yeon first drew notice in the period film Untold Scandal, playing the Cécile role in the 2003 Korean adaptation of Les Liaisons dangereuses. She has since played villains in several television dramas, namely Super Rookie, Spring Waltz, Temptation of an Angel, and in her most high-profile yet, Korean history's famous femme fatale Jang Hui-bin in Dong Yi. Seemingly a victim of typecasting on TV, Lee was finally given her first leading role in the romantic comedy Why Did You Come to Our House? (also known as Wanted: Son-in-Law). More lighthearted fare followed with My Life's Golden Age (about a family of siblings), and My Love By My Side in which she played a cheerful single mother. In 2012 she returned to period dramas as a gisaeng in Dr. Jin, followed by the contemporary daily dramas The Birth of a Family and Ruby Ring.

Unlike her TV series, Lee's films are a more diverse mix of mainstream and indie. Feathers in the Wind in particular brought her critical raves, with Darcy Paquet of Koreanfilm.org crediting Lee's "considerable screen presence" in making her character "memorable."

Lee counts pansori and jazz dancing among her hobbies. In 2007, she was chosen to be the ambassador for the Jecheon International Music & Film Festival.

From September 2013 to March 2014, Lee appeared on the fourth season of reality/variety show We Got Married, in which celebrities are paired together as fake wedded couples; Lee's partner was pianist Yoon Han. She returned to acting in the cable drama 12 Years Promise in 2014.

In June 2022, Lee launched her personal YouTube channel called 'Lee So-yeon So So TV.

In January 2024, Lee signed with new agency Ekkeul Entertainment.

== Personal life ==
Lee married an IT entrepreneur on September 12, 2015. In May 2018, it was reported that the couple were divorcing.

== Filmography ==
=== Television series ===
Year	Title	Role
2005	Spring Day	Kim Kyung-ah
2005	Super Rookie	Seo Hyun-ah
2005	Let's Get Married	Kwon Eun-sun
2006	Spring Waltz	Song Yi-na
2008	Why Did You Come to Our House?	Han Mi-soo
2008	My Life's Golden Age	Lee Geum
2009	Temptation of an Angel	Joo Ah-ran
2010	Dong Yi	Jang Hui-bin
2011	My Love By My Side	Do Mi-sol
2012	Dr. Jin	Choon-hong
2012	The Birth of a Family	Lee Soo-jung
2013	Ruby Ring	Jung Ru-bi/Jung Ru-na
2014	12 Years Promise	Jang Gook/Jang Dal-rae
2015	Beautiful You	Cha Seo-kyung
2017	Man Who Dies to Live	Lee Ji-young "B"
2017	A Korean Odyssey	Mysterious Bookseller (Episodes 9–10)
2019	Blessing of the Sea	Sim Chung-yi
2021	Miss Monte-Cristo	Go Eun-jo
2023	Twinkling Watermelon	adult Choi Se-kyung
2024	The Two Sisters	Lee Hye-won

=== Film ===
Year	Title	Role	Notes/Ref.
2002	Unborn But Forgotten		
2003	Summer Story		
2003	Untold Scandal	Lee So-ok	
2004	Joy of Love		short film
2004	Feathers in the Wind	So-yeon	
2006	One Shining Day	Go-ny	segment: "The Beautiful Strangers"
2007	Highway Star	Cha Seo-yeon	
2007	Bravo My Life	Kim Yoo-ri	
2011	The Dog and Key		short film
TBA	Nineteen, Thirty-Nine	Park Yeon-mi	

=== Music video appearance ===
Year	Song title	Artist
2007	"Wintering"	Eru

=== Television shows ===
Year	Title	Notes/Ref.
2006	Happy Sunday - Heroine 6	
2006–2007	Music Bank	Host
2009	Living Beauty: Paris Hair Sketch with Lee So-yeon	
2011	Dugeun Dugeun Studio of Love	
2012–2013	The Track	
2013–2014	We Got Married - Season 4	Cast member
2022	Olive Show Season 2	Host

== Awards and nominations ==
Year	Award	Category	Nominated work	Result
2005	MBC Drama Awards	Best New Actress	Super Rookie	Nominated
2007	China Golden Rooster Awards and Hundred Flowers Awards	Best Actress in a Foreign Film	Bravo My Life	Won
2008	MBC Drama Awards	Best New Actress	My Life's Golden Age	Won
2009	SBS Drama Awards	New Star Award	Temptation of an Angel	Won
2010	MBC Drama Awards	Excellence Award, Actress	Dong Yi	Won
2011	SBS Drama Awards	Excellence Award, Actress in a Weekend/Daily Drama	My Love By My Side	Won
2012	MBC Drama Awards	Excellence Award, Actress in a Miniseries	Dr. Jin	Nominated
2013	MBC Entertainment Awards	Excellence Award, Actress in a Variety Show	We Got Married	Won
2013	SBS Drama Awards	Excellence Award, Actress in Weekend/Daily Drama	The Birth of a Family	Nominated
2013	KBS Drama Awards	Excellence Award, Actress in a Daily Drama	Ruby Ring	Won
2016	MBC Drama Awards	Top Excellence Award, Actress in a Serial Drama	Beautiful You	Nominated
2017	MBC Drama Awards	Excellence Award, Actress in a Miniseries	Man Who Dies to Live	Nominated
2019	MBC Drama Awards	Top Excellence Award, Actress in a Weekend/Daily Drama	Blessing of the Sea	Nominated
2021	KBS Drama Awards	Excellence Award, Actress in a Daily Drama	Miss Monte-Cristo	Nominated
