= Feathers in the Wind =

- Poster for Feathers in the Wind (2004)
- Directed by: Song Il-gon
- Written by: Han Gi-hyeon; Song Il-gon
- Produced by: Kim Chul-hwan
- Starring: Jang Hyun-sung; Lee So-yeon
- Cinematography: Park Yeong-jun
- Edited by: Choi Jae-geun; Eom Ji-hwa
- Music by: Yun Min-hwa
- Distributed by: Korea Green Foundation
- Release dates: October 22, 2004 (Seoul Green Film Festival); January 14, 2005
- Running time: 73 minutes
- Country: South Korea
- Language: Korean

Feathers in the Wind (Korean: 깃; RR: Git; lit. 'Feather') is a 2004 South Korean film directed by Song Il-gon. It was originally planned as a 30-minute section of a three-part omnibus film with two other directors, entitled 1.3.6. At 73 minutes, the film exceeded the limits of the original omnibus format and was released on its own theatrically and on DVD.

== Synopsis ==
A film director comes to a small island near Jeju Province where he had agreed to meet his first love 10 years before. The woman had gone to university in Germany after the promise was made, and married a German conductor. Not entirely expecting to meet her, he comes to the island to work on his second screenplay. While on the island, he develops a friendly relationship with a young woman who runs an inn with her uncle, who has not spoken since his wife mysteriously left. On the appointed day, a piano arrives with news from the director's first love.

== Cast ==
- Jang Hyun-sung
- Lee So-yeon
- Kim Dae-ryeong
- Jo Sung-ha

== Bibliography ==
- "깃 Feathers in the Wind, 2004" (in Korean). Cine21.
- "Git (a.k.a. Feathers in the Wind)". Koreanfilm.org.
- Feathers in the Wind at HanCinema
- Feathers in the Wind at IMDb
