= Chu Sang-mi =

South Korean actress (born 1972)

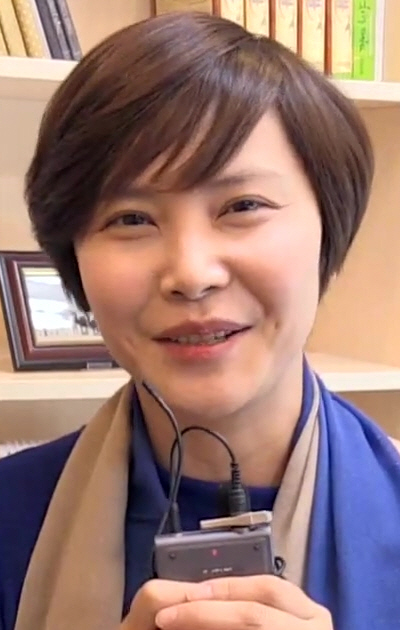
- Chu in May 2015

Korean name
- Hangul: 추상미
- Hanja: 秋相微
- RR: Chu Sangmi
- MR: Ch'u Sangmi

Chu Sang-mi (Korean: 추상미; born 9 May 1973) is a South Korean actress. She was born in Seoul, South Korea, to the popular stage actor Chu Song-woong. Along with Lee Byung-hun and Choi Ji-woo, Chu co-starred in the film Everybody Has Secrets, taking the role as the eldest sister of the trio.

== Filmography ==
=== Film ===
- 2007: The Wonder Years
- 2006: See You After School (cameo)
- 2006: Ssunday Seoul (cameo)
- 2005: My Right to Ravage Myself
- 2004: Everybody Has Secrets
- 2004: Twentidentity short - Under a Big Tree
- 2003: A Smile
- 2002: On the Occasion of Remembering the Turning Gate
- 2001: Say Yes
- 2000: Interview
- 1998: The Soul Guardians
- 1997: The Contact
- 1996: A Petal

=== Television drama ===
- 2024: When the Phone Rings (MBC) - Shim Kyu-jin
- 2022: Tracer (MBC) - Min So-jeong
- 2009: City Hall (SBS)
- 2008: My Woman (MBC)
- 2007: Snow in August (SBS)
- 2006: Love and Ambition (SBS)
- 2005: Let's Get Married (MBC)
- 2005: Lawyers (MBC)
- 2003: Yellow Handkerchief (KBS)
- 2003: Age of Warriors (KBS)
- 1999: Invitation (KBS)
- 1998: Lie (KBS)
- 1998: Sunflower (MBC)
- 1997: New York Story (SBS)

== Awards and nominations ==
Name of the award ceremony, year presented, category, nominee of the award, and the result of the nomination
Award ceremony	Year	Category	Nominee / Work	Result	Ref.
MBC Drama Awards	2022	Best Character Award	Tracer	Nominated	
