= Song Il-gon =

South Korean film director and screenwriter

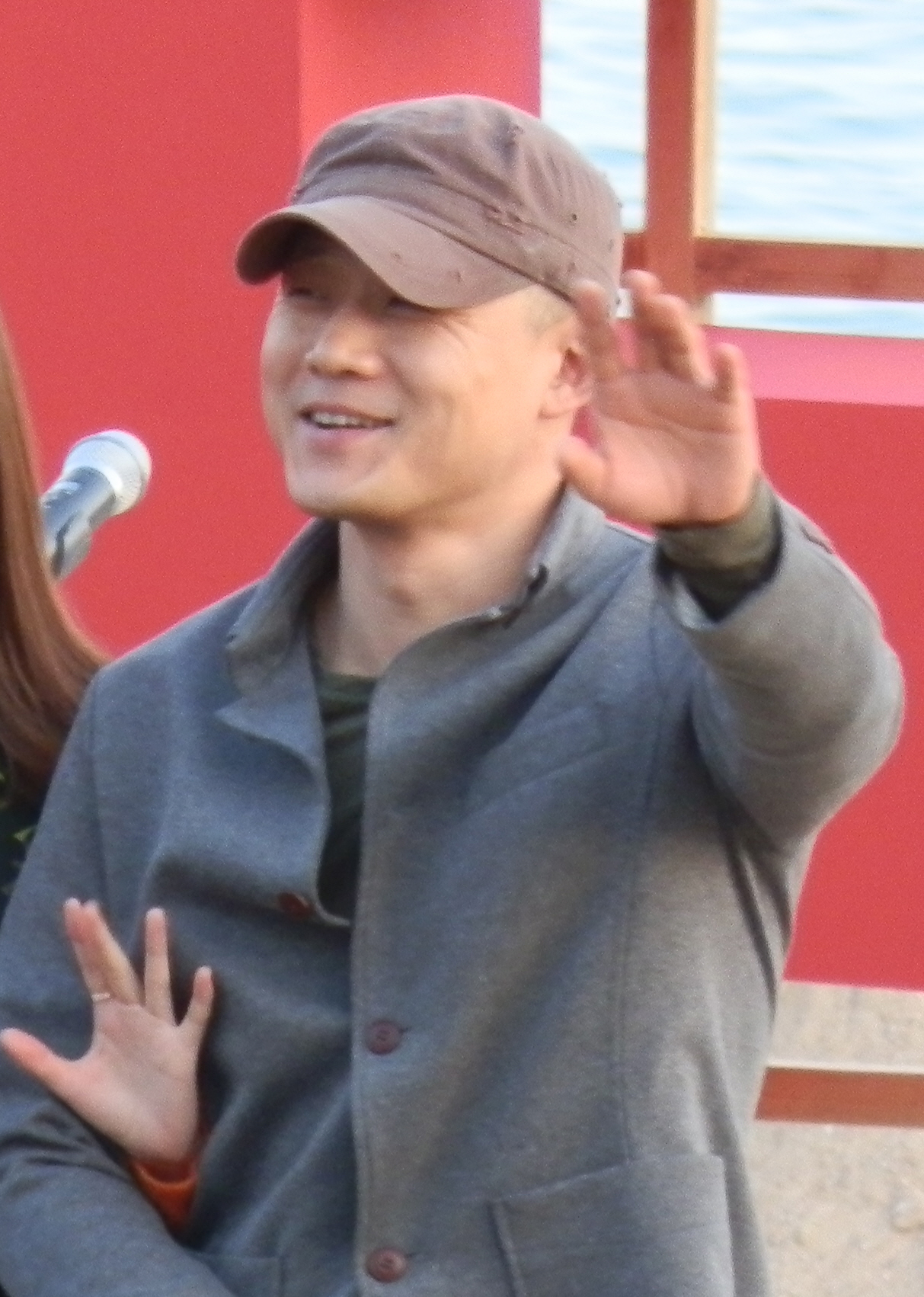
- Song Il-gon at the 2011 Busan International Film Festival
- Born: January 1, 1971 (age 55); Seoul, South Korea
- Education: Seoul Institute of the Arts; National Film School in Łódź
- Occupations: Film director, screenwriter
- Years active: 1998-present

Korean name
- Hangul: 송일곤
- Hanja: 宋一坤
- RR: Song Ilgon
- MR: Song Ilgon

Song Il-gon (born January 1, 1971) is a South Korean film director and screenwriter known for his internationally award-winning early short films, and later feature films such as Spider Forest (2004) and Feathers in the Wind (2005). Long more popular abroad than in South Korea, Song was the first Korean filmmaker to win an award at the Cannes Film Festival.

== Life and career ==
Song Il-gon was born in Seoul on January 1, 1971. He studied Fine Arts at the Seoul Institute of the Arts. After graduation he applied to study film in the United States. His visa application was rejected by that country, and Song instead attended the National Academy of Film in Łódź, Poland. He was only the second Korean student to study at this institution which is known for prominent alumni such as Roman Polanski and Krzysztof Kieślowski. Unable to deal with specifically Korean themes or history while in Poland, Song turned to themes influenced by psychology and Western mythology.

Beginning in 1998, Song's short films began attracting international attention. Liver and Potato (1998) took its inspiration from the biblical story of Cain and Abel. The Dream of the Clowns (also 1998) was filmed at a Polish circus. Both of these films were shown at international film festivals, and both were released at short-film specialty theaters in South Korea. Song became the first Korean to win an award at the Cannes Film Festival with his short film Picnic (Sopoong, 1999), which was given the Jury Prize for Best Short Film. This film was also given the Grand Prix at the Melbourne International Film Festival.

Back in Korea, Song was asked by the Seoul International Media Art Biennale (Media City Seoul) to make a 50-second video clip to be screened on electronic billboards for one month. He made Flush, about a teenage girl committing abortion in a public toilet. Even though Song had shown the screenplay to the government before filming, the authorities censored and removed the short after one day for its taboo subject.

Song's first feature film was Flower Island (2001), a story about three women with psychological wounds traveling together to an island that is said to have magical healing powers. The film was successful internationally, winning prizes at the Venice Film Festival and the Fribourg International Film Festival among others. Afterward Song took an acting role in director Park Kyung-hee's debut film, A Smile (Miso, 2004).

Spider Forest (2004), Song's second feature film, was not successful in the South Korean domestic market, either with audiences or critics. But it was Song's first film to be given a region-1 DVD release in the U.S.

Song's next feature film, Feathers in the Wind was originally planned as a 30-minute short as part of omnibus film 1.3.6, but major South Korean production studio CJ Entertainment gave Song funds to make the work into a feature for individual release. The resulting film was Song's first domestic success, with some Korean critics acclaiming it as the best romance ever filmed in Korea. The Magicians (2005) also began as a 40-minute short, one-third of the 2005 Jeonju Digital Project Talk to Her. Song expanded the experimental digitally shot film into a 96-minute feature done entirely in one tracking shot.

In February 2007, Song was reported to be working on a film with the working title of Telephone Girl. An adaptation of the stage play Telephone Modern Girl, the film was to deal with Korea during the 1920s and 1930s, when the country was modernizing under Japanese occupation. However, in January 2008, Song was reportedly in pre-production for a period horror film set during the Joseon dynasty entitled Sahwa ("Royal Massacre"). This film was scheduled to begin shooting in March 2008. Celebrated 1990s actor Moon Sung-keun was reported to be playing the lead role as a king dealing with murder as well as problems of a supernatural nature. These projects did not push through.

In 2009 Song turned to documentaries, telling the story of the Korean diaspora in Cuba in Dance of Time. He also contributed the titular short film to Sorry, Thanks, an omnibus film dealing with the profound relationships people establish with their pets.

Always, which opened the 2011 Busan International Film Festival, was his first mainstream film. Inspired by Charlie Chaplin's City Lights, Song said he wanted to make a "conventional love story which takes place in today's urban city."

Song shot the documentary Forest of Time in Yakushima, Japan, a UNESCO World Heritage Site that is said to have inspired Hayao Miyazaki's animated film Princess Mononoke.

== Filmography ==
- Liver and Potato (short film, 1998)
- The Dream of the Clowns (short film, 1998)
- Picnic (short film, 1999)
- Flush (short film, 2000)
- Flower Island (2001)
- Spider Forest (2004)
- Feathers in the Wind (2005)
- The Magicians (2006)
- Dance of Time (2009)
- Sorry, Thanks (short film, 2011)
- Always (2011)
- Forest of Time (2012)
- Still Shining (2026)

== Awards ==
=== Wins ===
- 1997 San Francisco International Film Festival: Certificate of Merit Film & Video - Short Documentary, The Dream of the Clowns (1997)
- 1999 Cannes Film Festival: Grand Prize of the Jury Best Short Film, Picnic (1999)
- 1999 Melbourne International Film Festival: Grand Prix, Picnic
- 2000 Aspen Shortsfest: Best Short Film Special Jury Award, Picnic
- 2001 Pusan International Film Festival: Audience Award and FIPRESCI Prize New Currents, Flower Island "For its remarkable direction in creating the interior universe of three women, and for its fine performances."
- 2001 Venice Film Festival 'CinemAvvenire' Award Best First Film, Flower Island
- 2002 Fribourg International Film Festival: FIPRESCI Prize, Flower Island "For its sensitive portrait of three human destinies, within an accomplished and mature cinematographic grammar."

=== Nominations ===
- 1999 Cannes Film Festival Golden Palm Best Short Film, Picnic (1999)
- 2004 San Sebastián International Film Festival: Golden Seashell, Spider Forest (2004)
