= Park Jin-hee =

South Korean actress (born 1978)

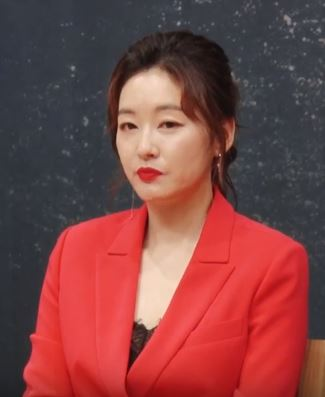
- Park in July 2019
- Born: January 8, 1978 (age 48); Haenam County, South Jeolla Province, South Korea
- Education: Dongduk Women's University (B.A. Broadcasting and Entertainment); Yonsei University (M.A. Social Welfare)
- Occupation: Actress
- Years active: 1996–present
- Agent: Elefun Entertainment
- Spouse: Unknown (m. 2014)
- Children: 2

Korean name
- Hangul: 박진희
- RR: Bak Jinhui
- MR: Pak Chinhŭi

Park Jin-hee (Korean: 박진희; born January 8, 1978) is a South Korean actress. She is best known for her leading roles in the television series Please Come Back, Soon-ae (2006), War of Money (2007), and Giant (2010), as well as for the film Shadows in the Palace (2007).

== Career ==
Park made her acting debut in 1996 teen drama Start, and rose to stardom in the 1998 horror film Whispering Corridors. She was praised for her emotional performance as a single mother in the KBS television series Stock Flower in 2001, but her other TV dramas were deemed forgettable. She starred in a string of commercial fare on the big screen, namely, Promenade with Kim Sang-joong, Just Do It! with Park Sang-myun, Star with Yoo Oh-sung, and Love in Magic with Yeon Jung-hoon, as well as the indie Love Talk with Bae Jong-ok and Park Hee-soon in 2005, but none of her films achieved critical or box office success. Park then stopped working for a year and a half, deciding to take some time off for a little introspection. The hiatus paid off in 2006 when she returned to the small screen in Please Come Back, Soon-ae, playing a 40-something ajumma trapped in the body of a sexy young 20-something (with the reverse played by Shim Hye-jin). The body swap comedy was a hit, with average ratings of 25%.

Her popularity continued in 2007 when her drama with Park Shin-yang, War of Money reached ratings of over 30%. As a righteous woman facing a slew of financial hardships, Park's acting was recognized at the SBS Drama Awards. She then drew laughs as a narcissistic character in the film Underground Rendezvous, a 1980s-set comedy about the North–south divide co-starring Im Chang-jung. But her next film would be even more high-profile: Shadows in the Palace, a mystery thriller set during the reign of King Jeongjo (1752–1800). Playing a court medic who investigates a murder within the ranks of the royal harem and household (the film's Korean title translates to kungnyŏ, or "palace women"), Park received critical acclaim for her performance, with one review calling it "the peak of her 10-year acting career." She won Best Actress at the Golden Cinematography Awards and the Fantasia Festival.

Following the 2008 film Sweet Lie (also known as Lost and Found) in which her character pretends to have amnesia to snag her dream guy, Park continued to explore the romantic comedy genre in The Woman Who Still Wants to Marry (also known as Still, Marry Me). In the low-rated 2010 series, she played a career woman in her 30s who falls for a musician ten years her junior (played by Kim Bum). Park then joined the epic period drama Giant, set during the economic boom of 1970-80s Korea, and co-starring Lee Beom-soo and Park Sang-min. The series was a hit with TV critics and audiences, with a ratings peak of 40%. And Park's portrayal of a vengeance-driven, ambitious woman who finds success as a loan shark was again lauded at the SBS Drama Awards.

She and Kim Hae-sook played mother and daughter in the melodrama A Long Visit (also known as My Mom), followed by Park's cameo appearance in war film 71: Into the Fire.

Park reunited with Stock Flower director Park Chan-hong and writer Kim Ji-woo in her next television series Kimchi Family, which aired on cable channel jTBC in 2011. She played a woman who takes over her father's kimchi restaurant and rediscovers her love for cooking and family, as she fights with and falls for a gangster played by Song Il-gook.

In 2012, she and John Park appeared in Music and Lyrics, an MBC Music reality show in which an actress and a male singer are paired together as lyricist and composer, respectively, to create a song. The song they composed, Maybe, Maybe, was recorded by Alex Chu and Horan of Clazziquai. Later that year, her arthouse film with Park Ji-yoon was released. Part-mystery, part-coming-of-age film, Grape Candy explored the nostalgia and tension at the reunion of two old high school friends who share a painful past.

Park joined the cast of Hur Jun, the Original Story (in Korean, Gu-am Heo Jun), about the Joseon-era royal physician Heo Jun (played by Kim Joo-hyuk). The historical drama aired daily on MBC in 2013.

After her childbirth, Park made a comeback in the tvN drama Memory. She next starred in family melodrama My Fair Lady.

Park replaced Go Hyun-jung as the lead actress in SBS thriller Return, after the latter quit due to conflicts with the production team.

In 2026, Park starred in KBS2's revenge drama Pearl in Red as twins Kim Myeong-hee and Kim Dan-hee.

== Other activities ==
In 2008, Park appeared in a Coreana cosmetics commercial dressed in a Nazi uniform. Amid protests from Jewish and international groups, the company apologized for their ill-conceived concept and pulled out the commercial after two days.

Park was one of the 40,000 volunteers who helped clean up after the 2007 MT Hebei Spirit oil spill in Taean County, South Chungcheong Province, the worst oil spill in Korean history. She came as part of the volunteer group Information Network Village (of which she was spokesperson), which aims to reduce the digital gap between rural and urban areas.

To promote the 2009 Green Film Festival in Seoul, she appeared in the short film Take Action, Now or Never!, directed by Kim Tae-yong. In the short, Park advocates riding bicycles to reduce greenhouse gas emissions. She was the 2012 honorary ambassador for the NGO Korea Green Foundation.

For her 2010 master's degree thesis for Yonsei University, "Studies on Depression and Suicidal Urges Among Actors," Park interviewed 260 actors with incomes ranging from ₩10 million-per-episode to less than ₩1 million a month. According to her findings, 40 percent were suffering from depression, and 20 percent had actually purchased pills or toxic agents and "devices" for suicide. Park said in the paper that the extreme stress to stay young and attractive and to remain in the limelight, or the job instability for lesser-known actors, drove them to mental anguish; and despite the perception of glamour and public adoration, actors were "some of the most lonesome and troubled" people.

== Personal life ==
Park married her boyfriend, a lawyer, on May 11, 2014, at the Hotel Shilla. She gave birth to her first child in December 2014. She gave birth to her second child on June 16, 2018.

== Filmography ==
=== Film ===
- Grape Candy (2012)
- 71: Into the Fire (2010) (cameo)
- A Long Visit (2010)
- Take Action, Now or Never! (short film, 2009)
- Turbanshell*cigarettebutt*egg roll (animated short, 2008) (voice)
- Sweet Lie (2008)
- Shadows in the Palace (2007)
- Underground Rendezvous (2007)
- Love Talk (2005)
- Love in Magic (2005)
- Star (2003)
- Just Do It! (2000)
- Promenade (2000)
- The Spy (1999)
- Love Wind Love Song (1999)
- Whispering Corridors (1998)

=== Television series ===
- Pearl in Red (2026)
- The King of Tears, Lee Bang-won (2021–2022)
- Taxi Driver (2021) (Cameo)
- Love Scene Number (2021)
- Doctor Detective (2019)
- Return (2018)
- My Fair Lady (2016)
- Memory (2016)
- Hur Jun, The Original Story (2013)
- Kimchi Family (2011)
- Giant (2010)
- The Woman Who Still Wants to Marry (2010)
- On Air (2008) (cameo, ep 1)
- War of Money (2007)
- Please Come Back, Soon-ae (2006)
- After Love (Japanese drama, 2005)
- MBC Best Theater "Love Without Regret" (2005)
- Since We Met (2002)
- Stock Flower (2001)
- Look Back in Anger (2000)
- KAIST (1999–2000)
- In Search of Love (1999)
- Will Make You Happy (1998)
- I Hate You, But It's Fine (1998)
- Start (1996–1997)

=== Variety show ===
- Angel Island (2022) - Regular Member; with Hong Seok-cheon
- The Sixth Mass Extinction (2021) - Narrator
- Happy Companion, Oh! My Life (2021) - Host
- Music and Lyrics (2012)
- It City: Park Jin-hee's Moving City (2009)

=== Radio program ===
- To You Who Forget the Night with Park Jin-hee (KBS Happy FM, 2002)
- Ten Ten Club with Kim Seung-hyun and Park Jin-hee (SBS Power FM, 2000)

=== Music video appearances ===
- "A Bottle of Liquor" (Haha feat. Tiger JK, 2010)
- "Woman" (Big Mama, 2005)
- "Standing in That Place" (Park Hyo-shin, 2002)

== Ambassadorship ==
- Natural Heritage Ambassador (2021)

== Awards ==
- 2022 KBS Drama Awards: Top Excellence Award, Actress (The King of Tears, Lee Bang-won)
- 2022 8th APAN Star Awards: Top Excellence Award, Actress in a Serial Drama (The King of Tears, Lee Bang-won)
- 2011 Korean Culture and Entertainment Awards: Hallyu Star Award
- 2011 KBS 감동대상: Hope Award
- 2011 7th Korea Green Foundation: 100 People Who Brightened Our World
- 2010 SBS Drama Awards: Excellence Award, Actress in a Special Planning Drama (Giant)
- 2010 SBS Drama Awards: Top 10 Stars (Giant)
- 2008 31st Golden Cinematography Awards: Best Actress (Shadows in the Palace)
- 2008 12th Fantasia Festival: Best Actress (Shadows in the Palace)
- 2007 SBS Drama Awards: Top Excellence Award, Actress (War of Money)
- 2007 SBS Drama Awards: Top 10 Stars (War of Money)
- 2007 27th Korea Best Dresser Swan Awards: Best Dressed
- 2006 SBS Drama Awards: Netizen Popularity Award (Please Come Back, Soon-ae)
- 2006 SBS Drama Awards: New Star Award (Please Come Back, Soon-ae )
- 2006 SBS Drama Awards: Top 10 Stars (Please Come Back, Soon-ae )
- 2000 23rd Golden Cinematography Awards: Best New Actress
