= The Beloved (2015 film) =

- 重生爱人
- Directed by: Cao Dawei
- Release date: May 15, 2015
- Running time: 89 minutes
- Country: China
- Language: Mandarin
- Box office: CN¥2.12 million (China)

The Beloved (Chinese: 重生爱人) is a 2015 Chinese suspense romance film directed by Cao Dawei. It was released on May 15, 2015 in China.

== Cast ==
- Wang Likun
- Kim Bum
- Joe Cheng
- Guan Yu
- Li Haoyu
- Zhang Cheng
- Jiang Peiyan
- Toby Lee

== Reception ==
By May 15, the film had grossed CN¥2.12 million at the Chinese box office.
