= Jin Yi-han =

South Korean actor

- Born: Kim Hyun-joong; October 10, 1978 (age 47); Yeongdeok County, North Gyeongsang Province, South Korea
- Education: Seoul Institute of the Arts
- Occupation: Actor
- Years active: 2002–present
- Agent: IHQ

Korean name
- Hangul: 김현중
- Hanja: 金鉉中
- RR: Gim Hyeonjung
- MR: Kim Hyŏnjung

Stage name
- Hangul: 진이한
- RR: Jin Ihan
- MR: Chin Ihan

Jin Yi-han (Korean: 진이한) (born Kim Hyun-Joong on October 10, 1978) is a South Korean actor. He began his acting career in 2002 in musical theatre, notably in Footloose. Jin soon branched out into television, and among his leading roles were in critically acclaimed Conspiracy in the Court (2007), family drama My Life's Golden Age (2008), daily drama Happiness in the Wind (2010), sitcom You're Here, You're Here, You're Really Here (2011), and mystery-romance My Secret Hotel (2014). He also played supporting roles in Who Are You? (2008), Bravo, My Love! (2011), Dr. Jin (2012), and Empress Ki (2013).

On September 23, 2016, Jin Yi-han changed his stage name to Kim Ji-han.

== Filmography ==
=== Television series ===
Year	Title	Role	Notes
2007	Conspiracy in the Court	Park Sang-Kyu	
2007	Evasive Inquiry Agency	Kim Jun-Soo	Cameo (Episode 7)
2008	Who Are You?	Shin Jae-Ha	
2008-2009	All About My Family	Lee Ki	
2010	Happiness in the Wind	Jang Dae-Han	
2010-2011	All My Love for You	Jeon Tae-Poong	
2011-2012	Bravo, My Love!	Han Jung-Soo	
2011-2012	Come, Come, Absolutely Come	Ko Chan-Young	
2011-2012	What's Up?	Kang Min-Woo	Cameo (Episode 12)
2012	Dr. Jin	Hong Young-Hwi	
2012	Drama Special Series	Seo In-Jae	Episode "Another Wedding"
2013	Master's Sun	Yoo Hye-Sung	Cameo (Episode 1)
2013-2014	Empress Ki	Tal Tal	
2014	A New Leaf	Jeon Ji-Won	
2014	My Secret Hotel	Ku Hae-Young	
2015	The Family is Coming	Choi Dong-Seok	
2016	Bring It On, Ghost	Hyun-Min	Special appearance (Episode 9-10)
2016-2017	Golden Pouch	Han Seok-Hoon	
2018	Cross	Lee Joo-Hyuk	
2023	Oasis	Oh Man-ok	

=== Film ===
Year	Title	Role
2004	Love, So Divine	Seminarian student 7
2010	Break Away	Park Min-Jae
2018	Faceless Boss	Goo Chul-Hwe

=== Variety show ===
Year	Title	Notes
2003	War of the Roses	
2011	National Heroes: On Your Command, Sir!	
2015	Useful Men	

=== Music video appearances ===
Year	Song title	Artist
2004	"Live Wire"	Seo Taiji
2009	"Tell Me Why"	Untouchable feat. Hwayoung
2009	"Like the First Time"	T-ara
2009	"Again, Waiting for the First Train"	Jung Tae-chun and Park Eun-ok
2011	"To Live at Least Once"	4Men
2011	"It's Not Working"	4Men

== Theater ==
Year	Title	Role
2002	UFO	
	Change	
2004	Padam Padam Padam	
2004	Lunatic	
2005-2006	Footloose	Ren McCormack
2005-2006	Six Minute Murder	Jung Si-kyu

== Awards and nominations ==
Year	Award	Category	Nominated work	Result
2007	KBS Drama Awards	Best New Actor	Conspiracy in the Court	Nominated
2010	KBS Drama Awards	Excellence Award, Actor in a Daily Drama	Happiness in the Wind	Nominated
