= Love in Magic =

- Theatrical poster
- Hangul: 연애술사
- Hanja: 戀愛術士
- RR: Yeonaesulsa
- MR: Yŏnaesulsa
- Directed by: Cheon Se-hwan
- Written by: Kim Kyu-won
- Produced by: Lee Hyo-seung; Lee Geun-du; Jo Yun-ho
- Starring: Park Jin-hee; Yeon Jung-hoon
- Cinematography: Hwang Chul-hyun
- Edited by: Nam Na-yeong; Heo Sun-mi
- Music by: Park Jeong-weon
- Distributed by: CJ Entertainment
- Release date: May 20, 2005
- Running time: 106 minutes
- Country: South Korea
- Language: Korean

Love in Magic (Korean: 연애술사; RR: Yeonaesulsa) is a 2005 South Korean romantic comedy film.

== Plot ==
The movie tells of a womanizing performing magician Woo Ji-hoon who one day discovers a hidden camera film on the Internet that shows him having sex with one of his former girlfriends, Koo Hee-won in a motel. Ji-hoon first tracks down Hee-won, who is working as a teacher at a local school. They decide that instead of going to the police, they'd be better off trying to track the film's makers themselves and get the film taken offline without making a fuss, since both of their careers could suffer. Ji-hoon and Hee-won start spending their evenings going through all the motels they visited while going out, and slowly rediscover their feelings for each other.

== Cast ==
- Park Jin-hee as Koo Hee-won
- Yeon Jung-hoon as Woo Ji-hoon
- Jo Mi-ryung as Lee Seon-hee
- Ha Dong-hoon (aka Haha) as Park Dong-sun
- Oh Yoon-ah as Kim Hyun-joo
- Kim Ji-seok as Yoon Woo-suk
- Choi Sung-kook as Han Joon-seok
- Choi Won-young as Han Joon-seok
- Park Yong-soo as Koo Hee-won's father
- Lee Kyung-jin as Koo Hee-won's mother
- Kim Ha-eun as Koo Mi-young
- Kang Jae-seop as Mi-young's boyfriend
- Kim Ji-young as sexy woman at the bar
- Kim Yong-hoon as Yoon Woo-suk's classmate
- Choi Eun-joo
- Choi Yeo-jin
- Shim Hyung-tak
- Jung Ui-gap
