= Hwang Young-hee =

South Korean actress (born 1969)

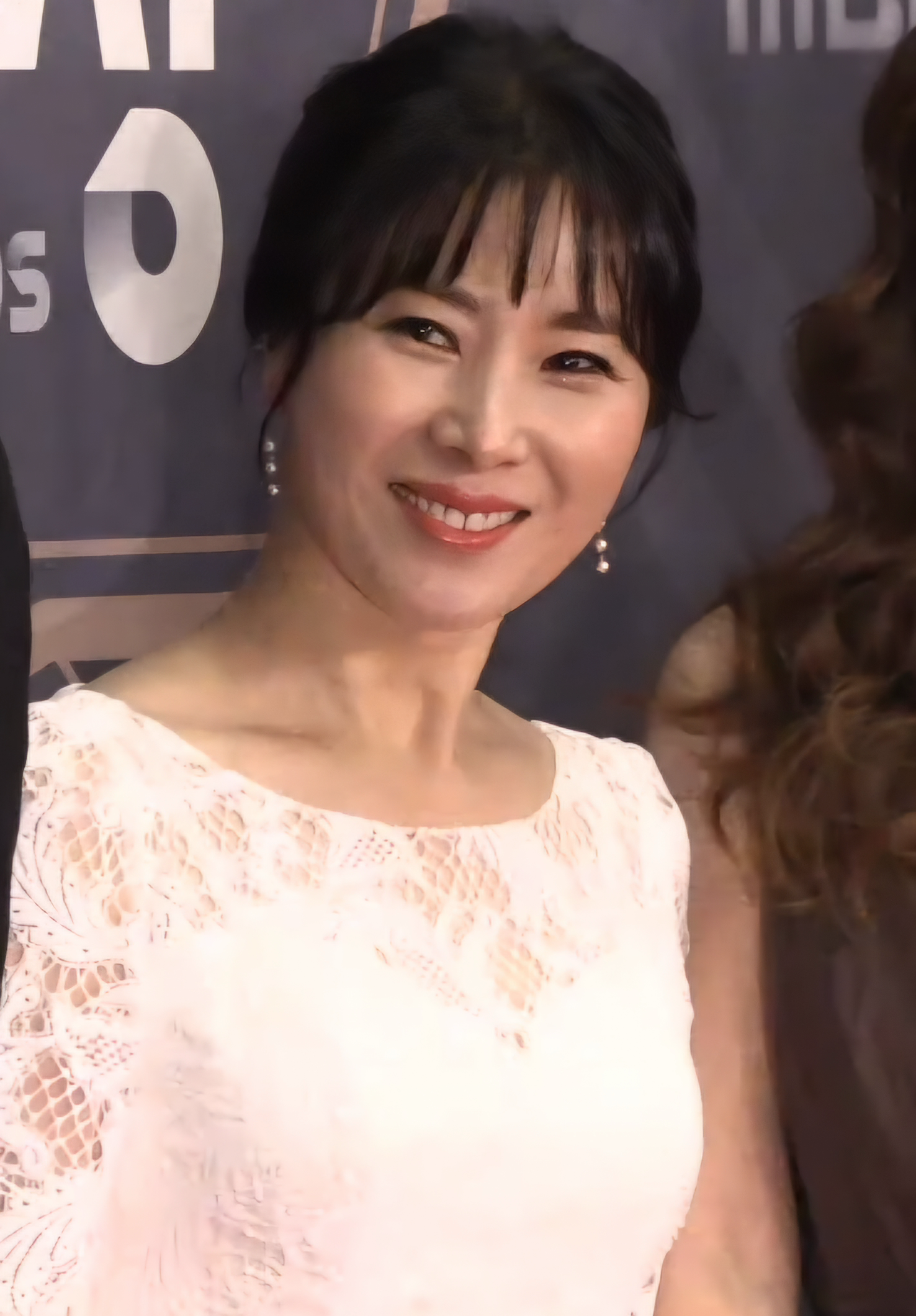
- Hwang in December 2018
- Born: March 22, 1969 (age 57); Mokpo, South Korea
- Education: Mokpo National University (Bachelor of Science)
- Occupations: Actress; model
- Years active: 1987–present
- Agent: Big Boss Entertainment

Korean name
- Hangul: 황영희
- RR: Hwang Yeonghui
- MR: Hwang Yŏnghŭi

Hwang Young-hee (Korean: 황영희; born March 22, 1969) is a South Korean actress and model. She is known for her roles in the dramas Queen of Tears, While You Were Sleeping, My Healing Love, and Nokdu Flower, and in movies such as The Witness, Stray Dogs, May 18, and Mother.

== Early life and education ==
Hwang was born on March 22, 1969, in Mokpo, South Korea. She attended Mokpo National University and graduated with a Bachelor of Science.

== Career ==
In 1987, she joined Big Boss Entertainment, starting off in many plays and theater performances.

In 2006, Hwang transitioned to screen appearances, starring in While You Were Sleeping, My Healing Love, Nokdu Flower and The King: Eternal Monarch. She also appeared in the films The Witness, Stray Dogs, May 18 and Mother.

== Filmography ==
=== Film ===
Year	Title	Role	Ref.
2007	Mr. Lee vs Mr. Lee	Woman in her 30s	
2008	May 18	In-bong's wife	
2009	Mother	Ah-jung's pregnant relative	
2012	Sex, Lies, and Videotape	Landlady	
2014	Miss Granny	Restaurant owner	
2014	Stray Dogs	Ham Bok-soon	
2016	Twenty Again	Mi-ra	
2018	Light My Fire	Chinese restaurant owner	
2018	The Witness	Women's society president	
2019	0.0MHz	Yoon-a	

=== Television series ===
Year	Title	Role	Ref.
2008	Beethoven Virus	Hyuk Kwon-chu	
2009	Three Men	Publishing editor-in-chief	
2011	My Princess	Hong In-ae	
2011	KBS Drama Special: "Guardian Angel Kim Young Goo"	Ms. Park	
2011	Kimchi Family	So-jung	
2011	Listen to My Heart	Seung-chul's mother	
2013	The Heirs	Jeguk High School teacher	
2013	KBS Drama Special: "The Strange Cohabitation"	Ms. Choi	
2013	The King's Daughter, Soo Baek-hyang	Gong-ok	
2014	Jang Bo-ri Is Here!	Min-jung's mother	
2014	Mr. Back	Lee In-ja	
2015	Sweden Laundry	Kim-bom's mother	
2015	Splendid Politics	Ok-joo	
2015	Divorce Lawyer in Love	Yoon Jung-sook	
2016	Gogh, The Starry Night	Lee Chung-kyung	
2016	Page Turner	Cha-shik's mother	
2016	Time of Miracle: Loss Time	Hyung-shik's mother	
2016	Marrying My Daughter Twice	Ma Seon-young	
2016	Secret Healer	Ms. Jeong	
2016	Wanted	Editor	
2016	Shopping King Louie	Hwang Geum-shim	
2017	Band of Sisters	Go Sang-mi	
2017	KBS Drama Special: "The Reason We Can't Sleep"	Hong Soon-ae	
2017	Innocent Defendant	Moong-chi's sister	
2017	Good Manager	Uhm Geum-shim	
2017	Romance Full of Life	In-sung's mother	
2017	The Secret of My Love	Mo Jin-ja	
2017	While You Were Sleeping	Yoon Moon-sun	
2017	The Package	So-so's mother	
2017	Revolutionary Love	Baek-joon's mother	
2018	Queen of Mystery 2	Park Kyung-ja	
2018	Rich Man	Jo Yun-shil	
2018	My Healing Love	Lee Sam-seuk	
2018	Tale of Fairy	Fairy Oh Seon-nyeo	
2018	The Last Empress	Baek Do-hee	
2018	The Hymn of Death	Madame Kim	
2019	Hotel del Luna	Hwang Mun-seok	
2019	When the Camellia Blooms	Lee Hwa-ja	
2019	Never Twice	Oh In-sook	
2019	Nokdu Flower	Chae Jung-shil	
2020	Hospital Playlist	Patient's relative	
2020	The King: Eternal Monarch	Min Hwa-yun	
2020	Men Are Men	Jung Young-soon	
2020	The Penthouse: War in Life	Yoon-hee's mother-in-law	
2020	Please Don't Date Him	Lee Eun-hwa	
2021	River Where the Moon Rises	Lady Sa	
2021	Youth of May	Choi Soon-nyeo	
2021	One the Woman	Kang Eun-hwa	
2021	The All-Round Wife		
2022	Jinxed at First	Mrs. Bang	
2022	Today's Webtoon	Hwang Mi-ok	
2022	The Law Cafe	Song Ok-ja	
2023	The First Responders Season 2	Song Hee-sook	
2023	Daily Dose of Sunshine	Da-eun's mother	
2024	Queen of Tears	Jeon Bong-ae: Hyun-woo's mother	
2024	Parole Examiner Lee	Lee Dong-myeong's mother	
2025	The Queen Who Crowns	Gyo Ha-daek	
2026	The East Palace	Consort Sukbin	

== Theatre ==
Year	Title	Korean Title	Role	Ref.
2021	The Dressing Room	분장실		

== Awards and nominations ==
Name of the award ceremony, year presented, category, nominee of the award, and the result of the nomination
Award ceremony	Year	Category	Nominee / Work	Result	Ref.
KBS Drama Awards	2021	Best Supporting Actress	River Where the Moon Rises	Nominated	
MBC Drama Awards	2018	Best Supporting Cast in Soap Opera	My Healing Love	Nominated	
SBS Drama Awards	2017	Best Supporting Actress	While You Were Sleeping	Nominated	
SBS Drama Awards	2021	Scene Stealer Award	One the Woman	Nominated	
