= Kimchi Family =

2011 South Korean television series

- Promotional poster
- Also known as: Fermented Family; Balhyo Family
- Hangul: 발효가족
- Hanja: 醱酵家族
- RR: Balhyo gajok
- MR: Parhyo kajok
- Genre: Romance; Comedy; Drama
- Written by: Kim Ji-woo
- Directed by: Park Chan-hong
- Starring: Song Il-kook; Park Jin-hee; Lee Min-young; Choi Jae-sung
- Country of origin: South Korea
- Original language: Korean
- No. of episodes: 24

Production
- Production location: Korea
- Running time: 70 minutes
- Production companies: Jidam Inc. (formerly Yein E&M)

Original release
- Network: JTBC
- Release: September 2, 2011 – June 8, 2012

Kimchi Family (Korean: 발효가족; lit. 'Fermentation Family') is a 2011 South Korean television series, starring Song Il-kook, Park Jin-hee, Lee Min-young and Choi Jae-sung. Song plays a gangster who turns over a new leaf and begins working at a kimchi restaurant run by two sisters. The series aired on jTBC from December 7, 2011 to February 23, 2012 on Wednesdays and Thursdays at 20:45 (KST) for 24 episodes.

== Synopsis ==
Lee Kang-san (Park Jin-hee) and Lee Woo-Joo (Lee Min-young) are sisters who suddenly have to take over running their family's traditional kimchi restaurant Chunjiin ("Heaven, Earth, and Man") after their father leaves without notice. The sisters must keep the restaurant going on their own, but they get some help from a troubled man, Ki Ho-tae (Song Il-gook), who shows up at the restaurant looking for his missing past. Ho-tae is an orphan who grew up to become a member of a crime syndicate, but he starts a new life as a worker at Chunjiin where he discovers the perks of having an excellent palate. Together with the other restaurant employees, long-time customers, and a growing circle of friends, they work towards their individual goals while finding warmth and family through their sharing of food and support of each other.

== Cast ==
- Song Il-kook as Ki Ho-tae
- Park Jin-hee as Lee Kang-san
- Lee Min-young as Lee Woo-Joo
- Choi Jae-sung as Kang Do-shik
- Kang Shin-il as Lee Ki-chan
- Kim Young-hoon as Oh Hae-joon
- Yoon Hee-soo as Na Eun-bi
- Lee Dae-geun as Elder Seol
- Kim Byeong-chun as Han Pyung-man
- Lee Il-hwa as Jung Geum-joo
- Lee Kan-hee as Kang-san's mother
- Choi Yong-min as Oh Myung-cheol
- Jung Ae-ri as Jung Hyun-sook
- Choi Deok-moon as Jo Dae-shik
- Kim Sang-hoon as Kim Dong-soo
- Jo Jae-wan as Park Hyun-soo
- Oh Yong as Jo Mi-nam
- Kim Ki-bok as Detective
- Lee A-rin as Bo-yo
- Hwang Young-hee as So-jung
- Cho Yeon-woo as Choi Yong-bin
- Kim Ha-eun as Ji-hyun
- Shin Hyun-tak as Sung-jin
- Kim Bo-mi as Hye-young
- Kim Do-yeon as Madame Soo
- Shin Hyun-been as Yukie
- Choi Jae-sup as Yoo Jung-ho
- Kim Kyu-chul as Jung Sung-min
- Cha Hyun-woo
- Kim Ga-eun

== International broadcast ==
- Philippines: TV5
- Iran: IRIB Namayesh TV - aired from March 26 to April 18, 2015, every day at 19:00.
- Thailand: True Asian Series
