= Kim Jeong-hoon =

South Korean singer and actor (born 1980)

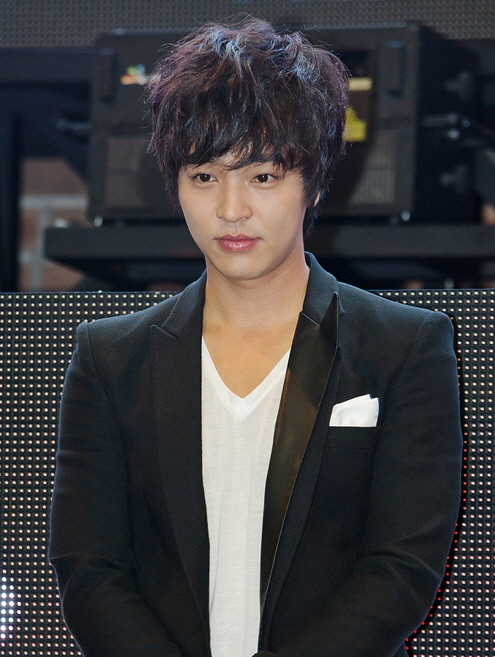
- Kim in June 2011
- Born: January 20, 1980 (age 46); Jinju, South Korea
- Other name: John Hoon
- Education: Chung-Ang University (BFA)
- Years active: 2000–present
- Agent: Mersenne Entertainment
- Height: 1.79 m (5 ft 10 1/2 in)

Korean name
- Hangul: 김정훈
- Hanja: 金楨勳
- RR: Gim Jeonghun
- MR: Kim Chŏnghun
- Website: kimjeonghoon.com

Kim Jeong-hoon (Korean: 김정훈; born January 20, 1980), also known by his stage name John Hoon, is a South Korean singer and actor. He initially rose to fame as a member of South Korean duo UN debuting with the single Voice Mail in 2000. After the duo disbanded in 2005, his fame increased as an actor starring in Princess Hours, a drama based on a manhwa.

== Career ==
He debuted as a member of Korean duo UN in 2000, an acronym for "United N-generation". After six years of success, the duo officially announced that they were disbanding in September 2005, and Kim announced that he was going to pursue an acting career instead. Kim had stated that the conditions of the Korean music industry prevented him from pursuing music he truly wanted to do.

He originally wanted to be a laboratory researcher. Kim did not realize that he would become an actor and singer. By 2005 he had already begun starring in Korean dramas, such as sitcom Orange and A Man and a Woman in 2004. However Kim Jeong-hoon made his major break through when he starred in the hit MBC drama Princess Hours alongside Yoon Eun-hye and Ju Ji-hoon. Kim played the role of Yul, a caring and gentle 19-year-old who is second in line to become the crown prince and has returned to Korea to reclaim the two things that were snatched from him after his father's death: the title of crown prince and the crown princess who was initially supposed to marry him. He had said his final dream is to become a renowned movie director. On April 28, 2009, he left the public for mandatory military service of two years. 80000 of Kim Jeong-hoon's fans from Japan, Korea, Turkey and China gathered to see him off to serve the country.

After serving two years in military, Kim returned to civilian life on February 28, 2011. He has appeared in a number of dramas and shows upon his return. In 2016, Kim was cast in the Chinese drama God of War, Zhao Yun along with Girls' Generation's YoonA. Kim portrayed Gao Ze, a love interest of YoonA's character in a love triangle. That was his first historical drama.

== Education ==
Kim attended Seoul National University and took up Dentistry but decided to drop out to focus on his acting career. Later on, he enrolled in Chung-Ang University, where he majored in acting.

== Filmography ==
=== Television drama ===
Year	Title	Role	Notes
1991	The Three Day Promise	Jung Dong-gyu	
2002	Orange	Kim Jeong-hoon	
2005	Promise	Jung Seung-woo	
2006	Princess Hours	Prince Lee Yul	
2006	An Angel Will Love You For Me	Yin Tangyao	
2007	Witch Yoo Hee	Yoo Jun-ha	
2008	Love Strategy	Jin Zhen Hao / Kim Jung-ho	
2011	I Need Romance	Kim Sung-soo	
2011	RUN60	Pierro / Second GHOST	
2012	Dummy Mommy	Lee Je-ha	
2013	Love in Her Bag	Do Ji-hoo	
2013	Love On Tiptoe	Wen Qing Yao	
2015	Missing Korea	Yoo Jung-hoon	
2015	Late Night Restaurant	Kang Hyun-sung	
2015	Immutable Law of First Love	Park Jong-goo	
2015-2016	The Three Witches	Joon-young	
2016	God of War, Zhao Yun	Gao Ze	
2016	Start Again	Ha Sung-jae	
2016	Distressed Beauty	Bao Wen Xun	

=== Film ===
Year	Title	Role	Notes
2004	DMZ	Kim Ji-hun	
2004	Shut Up!	Kwon Myung-seok	
2004	None of Your Cheek	Myung-suk	
2006	Fog street	Lee Yoon-soo	
2009	Cafe Seoul	Kim Sang-hyuk	Korean-Japanese film
2011	Sunday Punch	Lee Soo-hyun	
2012	RUN60 -GAME OVER	Kim Seon-hyeok	
2014	Stray Dogs	So Yoo-joon	
2015	Emperor's Holidays	Detective Park	
2018	Pacific Rim: Uprising	Lieutenant Huang	Hollywood Debut

=== Music video appearances ===
Year	Song title	Artist
2003	"Don't Cry"	Paran
2006	"2nd Story"	RAN

== Musical theatre ==
Year	Title	Role
2012	Catch Me If You Can	Frank Abagnale Jr.

== Discography ==
- Mini-Album (at UN Years) - Best Album [2006]
- 1st Mini-Album - 5 Stella Lights [25.10.2006]
- 1st Single - Sad Song [28.02.2007]
- 2nd Single - Boku Wa Kimi Wo Aishiteru [16.05.2007]
- 3rd Single - Kimi ni Deatta Hi Kara [05.09.2007]
- 1st Album - Bokutachi Itsuka Mata... ~ETERNITY~ [17.10.2007]
- 4th Single - Sakura TEARS [20.02.2008]
- 5th Single - Kimi wo Mamoritai [16.07.2008]
- 6th Single - You Are Not Alone [01.10.2008]
- 2nd Album - Kyo mo Atarashii Yume wo Miru [05.11.2008]
- 7th Single - Blue Moon [01.07.2009]
- 1st Single Korea - In Your Eyes [03.09.2009]
- 1st Single Korea - In Your Eyes [16.12.2009] Japan Version
- 8th Single - Rainy Flash [20.01.2010]
- 9th Single - Al Dente [18.08.2010]
- 3rd Album - Machi [17.11.2010]
- 2nd Single Korea - Present [16.04.2011]
- 4th Album - Voice [23.05.2012]
- 1st Mini Album Korea - My Story [12.10.2012]
- 10th Single - Message [31.10.2012]
- 5th Album - Voice 2 [31.10.2012]
- 1st Mini Album Chinese - Lov...ing [11.11.2012]
- 11th Single - Futari kinenbi [16.01.2013]
- 12th Single - Haru koi [03.04.2013]
- 6th Album - Love×Best [09.01.2014]
- 2nd Mini Album Korea - 5091 [03.07.2014]
- 1st Best Album - John Hoon -Do My Best- [16.07.2014]
- 13th Single - Special Day [21.01.2015]
- 14th Single - Harukaze [06.04.2016]
- 3rd Single Korea - Marry Me, Marry You [06.05.2016]
- 15th Single - Prologue ~ koi o yobu uta ~ [25.01.2017]
- 1st Mini Album Japan - Kioku no Kaori [26.07.2017]
- 16th Single - Ima ~ yume no yō ni kimi ga ~ [11.07.2018]

== Variety show ==
Year	Title	Network	Notes
2014	The Genius: Black Garnet	tvN	ep.4
2014-2015	'off to school	tvN	ep.1 - ep.6
2016	King of Mask Singer	MBC	ep. 51
2017	Radio Star	MBC	ep. 515
2017	Problematic Man	tvN	ep.94
2018	Its Good To Be A Little Crazy	SBS	ep.11
2018	secretgarden	tvN	ep.5
2018	Radio Star	MBC	ep. 576
2018	Foreigner	MBC	ep.1, ep.2
2018	Taste of Love	tvChosun	ep.1 - ep.9

== Ambassadorship ==
- 2003 UN (United Nations) Public Relations Ambassador
- 2005 'Korea Drama Festival 2005' Ambassador
- 2006 10th Seoul International Manga and Animation Festival (SICAF) Ambassador
- 2007 International Broadcasting Video Sample (STVF 2007) Korean Drama Ambassador

== Awards and nominations ==
- 2001 Selected as 'Healthy Tooth Artist' for the 56th Oral Health Week by the Seoul Dental Association
- 2001 SBS Music Awards Popularity Award
- 2001 KMTV Music Awards Bonsang
- 2002 SBS Music Awards Ballad Category Award
- 2003 SBS Gayo Daejeon Producer Award
- 2004 KBS Music Awards Singer of the Year (Bonsang)
- 2008 Seoul Hallyu Festival Achievement Award
