= Please Come Back, Soon-ae =

- Promotional poster
- Also known as: Come Back, Soon-ae! The Return of Soon-ae; Please Come Back Soon
- Hangul: 돌아와요 순애씨
- RR: Dorawayo Sunae ssi
- MR: Torawayo Sunae ssi
- Written by: Choi Soon-shik
- Directed by: Han Jung-hwan
- Starring: Shim Hye-jin; Park Jin-hee; Lee Jae-hwang; Yoon Da-hoon
- Opening theme: singer/s Kim Tae Hun hangeul 그대뿐이죠 Kudaeppunijyo (그대뿐이죠) Lyrics
- Ending theme: singer/s Park Rae Joon hangeul Day By Day Lyrics Lyrics
- Country of origin: South Korea
- Original language: Korean
- No. of episodes: 16

Production
- Executive producers: Kim Young-seop; Lee Joo-young; Kwon Hyuk
- Producers: Kang Shin-hyo; Kim Woo-no
- Camera setup: Multi-camera
- Running time: 60 minutes Wednesdays and Thursdays at 21:55
- Production companies: DRM Media; CU Production

Original release
- Network: Seoul Broadcasting System
- Release: July 12 – August 31, 2006

Related
- Ohlala Couple

Please Come Back, Soon-ae (Korean: 돌아와요 순애씨) is a 2006 South Korean television series that aired on SBS from July 12 to August 31, 2006, on Wednesdays and Thursdays at 21:55 for 16 episodes. In this comedy-drama starring Shim Hye-jin and Park Jin-hee, a body switch occurs between two women, forcing them to live the other's life and understand each other.

== Plot ==
Heo Soon-ae is a 40-year-old homemaker devoted to her pilot husband Yoon Il-seok, their son, and Il-seok's mother who lives with them. But one day Soon-ae discovers that her husband has been cheating on her with a 28-year-old flight attendant, Han Cho-eun. Cho-eun confronts Soon-ae to convince her to divorce Il-seok so she can take her place. The two get into a car together and drive towards the airport where Il-seok is due to arrive from a flight; the plan is to show up in front of Il-seok together and ask him directly who he wants to be with. The plot turns supernatural, however, when the two women fall victim to an accident that switches their identities; Soon-ae becomes trapped in Cho-eun's body, and vice versa. Since they can't seem to change back the two must learn to live in each other's body, posing as the other woman.

== Cast ==
=== Main characters ===
- Shim Hye-jin as Heo Soon-ae (Age: 40)
- Park Jin-hee as Han Cho-eun (Age: 28)
- Lee Jae-hwang as Jang Hyeon-woo (Age: 32)
- Yoon Da-hoon as Yoon Il-seok (Age: 42)

=== Supporting characters ===
- Jung Jae-soon as Yeo Myung-ja (Age: 65)
- Kwon Hae-hyo as Han Hyun-jong (Cho-eun's uncle)
- Park Mi-sun as Park Jung-sook (Age: 40)
- Ahn Moon-sook as Jo Dae-sook
- Lee Seon-jin as Kang Eun-kyung (Age: 30)
- Kim Hyung-bum as Seo Joon-ho (Age: 30)
- Hwang Ji-hyun as Lee So-myung
- Jang Ji-woo as Han Jae-woong (Cho-eun's brother)
- Shin Dong-woo as Yoon Chan
- Sung Dong-il as airline passenger
- Park Si-yeon as flight attendant on last airplane (guest appearance)
- Kim Kwang-kyu as male harassing passenger on airplane

== Remake ==
A Russian remake titled Немного не в себе ("In the Wrong Skin") aired on Channel One from August 29 to September 15, 2011, for 12 episodes.

An Indonesian remake was titled Pacarku bukan istriku.

== See also ==
- List of Korean television shows
- Contemporary culture of South Korea
