= War of Money =

South Korean television series

- Promotional poster for War of Money
- Also known as: Money's Warfare; Money War
- Hangul: 쩐의전쟁
- Hanja: 錢의戰爭
- RR: Jjeonuijeonjaeng
- MR: Tchŏnŭijŏnjaeng
- Written by: Lee Hyang-hee; Yoo Jung-soo
- Directed by: Jang Tae-yoo
- Starring: Park Shin-yang; Park Jin-hee; Shin Dong-wook; Kim Jung-hwa
- Music by: Jo Yoon-jong (CP); Kim Hyeong-seok; (1st album); Um Ki-eup; Ha Kwang-suk; (2nd album)
- Original language: Korean
- No. of episodes: 20 (16 + 4)

Production
- Executive producers: Lee Yong-suk; Kim Young-sup (SBS Drama Division)
- Producers: Seo Jeong-pil; Jo Yoon-jong
- Running time: Wednesdays and Thursdays at 21:55 (KST)
- Production company: Victory Production

Original release
- Network: SBS TV
- Release: May 16 – July 19, 2007

War of Money (Korean: 쩐의 전쟁; RR: Jjeonui jeonjaeng; also known as Money's Warfare) is a 2007 South Korean television drama series adaptation of Park In-kwon's comic of the same name. Starring Park Shin-yang and Park Jin-hee, it aired on SBS from May 16 to July 19, 2007 on Wednesdays and Thursdays at 21:55 for 20 episodes.

Originally scheduled for 16 episodes, due to its popularity it was extended to 20, but only Park Shin-yang starred in the four-episode "bonus round."

== Plot ==
Geum Na-ra was once a top-ranked investment banker, until his life falls apart when his debt-ridden father commits suicide after constantly being harassed by loan sharks. Traumatized, his mother collapses and is rushed to the hospital. Na-ra applies for a bank loan but is flatly denied, and his disgruntled boss takes advantage of Na-ra's troubles and uses them as an excuse to fire him. His mother eventually dies, despite his and his sister Eun-ji's (Lee Young-eun) desperate efforts to obtain cash to pay for her hospital fees. Newlywed Eun-ji had become a room salon hostess, while Na-ra agreed to break up with his longtime girlfriend Lee Cha-yeon (Kim Jung-hwa) in exchange for cash from Cha-yeon's disapproving grandmother Madam Bong (Yeo Woon-kay). Believing that it's the source of all evil, Na-ra declares war on money and becomes obsessed with avenging his parents' deaths. However, realizing the only way to defeat his enemy is to understand the enemy, Na-ra decides to become a loan shark himself, and begins working as a ruthless money collector for the notorious loan shark Ma Dong-po (Lee Won-jong), while learning the trade secrets along with life's philosophies from the old and legendary pro Dokgo Chul (Shin Goo) who reluctantly takes Na-ra under his wing.

Na-ra enters into a rivalry with Ha Woo-sung (Shin Dong-wook), another moneylender who works for Madam Bong and has secretly loved Cha-yeon for years. Then Na-ra meets Seo Joo-hee (Park Jin-hee). Joo-hee was supposed to marry a divorced man to solve her family's financial problems, but on the day of the wedding, Na-ra showed up to collect the debts and ended up ruining her plans. Joo-hee vows to take her revenge on him but she falls in love with him instead. When Na-ra learns that his gangster boss Ma Dong-po was the very man responsible for his father's death, he keeps his cool, waiting for the right time and the right place to seek his revenge. Meanwhile, competition between banks and loan sharks is getting tense and a war over money threatens to erupt.

== Cast ==
=== Main characters ===
- Park Shin-yang as Geum Na-ra
- Park Jin-hee as Seo Joo-hee
- Shin Dong-wook as Ha Woo-sung
- Kim Jung-hwa as Lee Cha-yeon

=== Supporting characters ===
- Shin Goo as Dokgo Chul
- Lee Won-jong as Ma Dong-po
- Lee Young-eun as Geum Eun-ji
- Jung Jae-soon as Lee Kyung-ja
- Nam Il-woo as Geum Sang-soo
- Park In-hwan as Seo In-chul
- Jung Soo-young as Kim Hyun-jung
- Jang Dong-jik as Kang In-hyuk
- Yeo Woon-kay as Madam Bong
- Kim Roi-ha as Kim Dong-goo
- Lee Moon-sik as boss of securities company
- Kim Hyung-bum as Jo Chul-soo
- Lee Jae-yong as Oh Jae-bong
- Choi Sung-ho as Lee Young-suk
- Kim Kwang-sik as Soo-pyo
- Kim Hee-jung as Dong-po's wife
- Jo Sang-ki as wayward son
- Lee Ki-yeol as insurance examiner
- Min Ji-young as Eun-joo
- Lee Byung-joon as Kim Min-goo
- Lee Dol-hyung as homeless person
- Im Sung-eun as swindler
- Choi Min as inspector of So-Mang bank
- Park Seung-jae as the CEO
- Kim Yong-il as the CEO's right-hand man

== Awards and nominations ==
| Year | Award | Category | Recipient | Result |
|---|---|---|---|---|
| 2007 | SBS Drama Awards | Daesang (Grand Prize) | Park Shin-yang | Won |
| 2007 | SBS Drama Awards | Top Excellence Award, Actress | Park Jin-hee | Won |
| 2007 | SBS Drama Awards | Best Supporting Actor in a Miniseries | Lee Won-jong | Won |
| 2007 | SBS Drama Awards | Best Supporting Actress in a Miniseries | Kim Jung-hwa | Nominated |
| 2007 | SBS Drama Awards | New Star Award | Shin Dong-wook | Won |
| 2007 | SBS Drama Awards | New Star Award | Lee Young-eun | Won |
| 2007 | SBS Drama Awards | Top 10 Stars | Park Shin-yang | Won |
| 2007 | SBS Drama Awards | Top 10 Stars | Park Jin-hee | Won |
| 2007 | SBS Drama Awards | Netizen Popularity Award | Park Shin-yang | Won |
| 2007 | SBS Drama Awards | Achievement Award | Shin Goo | Won |
| 2008 | 44th Baeksang Arts Awards | Best Drama | War of Money | Won |
| 2008 | 44th Baeksang Arts Awards | Best Director (TV) | Jang Tae-yoo | Nominated |
| 2008 | 44th Baeksang Arts Awards | Best Actor (TV) | Park Shin-yang | Won |
| 2008 | 44th Baeksang Arts Awards | Best Actress (TV) | Park Jin-hee | Nominated |

== Ratings ==
- In the table below, the blue numbers represent the lowest ratings and the red numbers represent the highest ratings.
- NR denotes that the drama did not rank in the top 20 daily programs on that date.

| Ep. | Original broadcast date | Average audience share | | | |
| Ep. | Original broadcast date | TNmS | | AGB Nielsen | |
| Ep. | Original broadcast date | Nationwide | Seoul | Nationwide | Seoul |
|---|---|---|---|---|---|
| 1 | May 16, 2007 | 17.3% (5th) | 18.8% (4th) | 16.4% (7th) | 17.9% (6th) |
| 2 | May 17, 2007 | 23.3% (2nd) | 25.2% (2nd) | 22.5% (2nd) | 24.2% (2nd) |
| 3 | May 23, 2007 | 26.5% (2nd) | 29.4% (1st) | 24.5% (2nd) | 26.4% (2nd) |
| 4 | May 24, 2007 | 28.8% (2nd) | 30.9% (1st) | 26.6% (2nd) | 28.3% (2nd) |
| 5 | May 30, 2007 | 27.3% (2nd) | 28.7% (1st) | 25.5% (2nd) | 26.0% (2nd) |
| 6 | May 31, 2007 | 30.5% (1st) | 32.3% (1st) | 30.0% (1st) | 31.0% (1st) |
| 7 | June 6, 2007 | 33.5% (1st) | 35.2% (1st) | 32.5% (1st) | 33.1% (1st) |
| 8 | June 7, 2018 | 31.9% (1st) | 33.2% (1st) | 34.1% (1st) | 36.0% (1st) |
| 9 | June 13, 2007 | 33.4% (1st) | 35.6% (1st) | 33.5% (1st) | 34.8% (1st) |
| 10 | June 14, 2007 | 34.6% (1st) | 37.1% (1st) | 33.9% (1st) | 34.5% (1st) |
| 11 | June 20, 2007 | 34.6% (1st) | 36.7% (1st) | 34.9% (1st) | 37.0% (1st) |
| 12 | June 21, 2007 | 35.3% (1st) | 35.9% (1st) | 35.2% (1st) | 35.6% (1st) |
| 13 | June 27, 2007 | 34.3% (1st) | 36.5% (1st) | 33.3% (1st) | 35.0% (1st) |
| 14 | June 28, 2007 | 34.2% (1st) | 36.0% (1st) | 34.6% (1st) | 35.6% (1st) |
| 15 | July 4, 2007 | 34.5% (1st) | 36.3% (1st) | 34.8% (1st) | 35.7% (1st) |
| 16 | July 5, 2007 | 36.0% (1st) | 37.3% (1st) | 36.3% (1st) | 36.6% (1st) |
| Average | | % | % | % | % |

== War of Money Bonus Round ==
Because of the series' high viewership ratings of over 30%, SBS filmed an additional four episodes featuring new characters and a new plot not found in the original comic, titled War of Money Bonus Round. Park Shin-yang was the only main cast member who reprised his role (Park Jin-hee and Shin Goo were unable due to scheduling conflicts). Among his costars were Kim Ok-vin, who played Geum Na-ra's girlfriend, and Park Hae-mi, who portrayed a physically-challenged moneylending tycoon. Under the theme "poetic justice" or "dilemma," the bonus round did not focus on revenge, but on Na-ra's new challenges as an ingenious debt collector. Ratings were also successful, recording over 25%.

=== Cast ===
- Park Shin-yang as Geum Na-ra
- Kim Ok-vin as Lee Soo-young
- Jung So-young as Kang Hye-won
- Park Hae-mi as Chairwoman Jin
- Seo Jun-young as Kim Byul, Chairwoman Jin's son
- Chae Min-seo as beautiful lady (cameo)
- Park Jin-hee as ex-secretary of a corrupt congressman (cameo, ep 4)

=== Controversy ===
According to his contract, Park Shin-yang was paid ₩45 million per episode for the original 16 episodes. But to appear in the four extra episodes, he negotiated a fee of ₩170 million per episode.

The producers agreed, but later reneged on the deal, alleging that Park tried to capitalize on the drama's high popularity by asking for too much money. Park took legal action, and in November 2009, he won the lawsuit, with the Seoul District Court ruling (upheld by the Seoul High Court) that "although the guarantees promised in the extra contract were three times higher than those paid for Park's appearances in the original contract," the two contracts were independent of each other, and the second contract was legal and binding.

Consequently, the Corea Drama Production Association (CODA) banned Park from appearing in any dramas produced by members of the association for an indefinite period. Calling Park's ₩170 million per episode fee higher than the fee paid to an outsourcing production company by a broadcaster, CODA said such exorbitant actor's salaries shouldn't be tolerated since it adversely affects the drama production industry, from writers and producers to technical staff. Following CODA's announcement, about 5,600 overseas fans issued a joint petition to denounce the decision.

After a three-year absence on television, the ban on Park was lifted in 2011.

== Remake ==
A Japanese drama remake also titled War of Money (銭の戦争, Zei no Senso), starring Tsuyoshi Kusanagi and Yuko Oshima, will air on Fuji TV in January 2015.
