= Jung Jae-soon =

South Korean actress (born 1947)

- Born: 15 February 1947 (age 79); Cheonan, South Korea
- Other name: Jeong Jae-soon
- Education: Cheonan Girls' High School
- Occupation: Actress
- Years active: 1968–present
- Known for: My Only One; Homemade Love Story; Three Bold Siblings
- Children: 2

Jung Jae-soon is a South Korean actress. She is known for her roles in dramas such as Homemade Love Story, My Only One, House of Bluebird and Three Bold Siblings. She also appeared in films Let's Look at the Sky Sometimes, Our Class Accepts Anyone Regardless Of Grade, Carnivorous Animal, Longing for Love, and Let's Look at the Sky Sometimes.

== Filmography ==
=== Television series ===
Year	Title	Role	Ref.
1991	Women 45	Jeong-sun	
1994	Farewell	Oh Jae-ok	
1995	Jang Nok Soo	Court Lady Park	
1996	Icing	Yoon Chan's mother	
1996	A Faraway Nation	Woon-ha's mother	
1996	Mom's Flag	Seung-joon's mother	
1996	Power of Love	Ko Min-ah	
1998	Song of The Wind	Mrs. Shin	
1999	Now is the Time to Love	Seo Mi-ri	
1999	Trap of Youth	Yoon-hee's aunt	
1999	Queen	Seung-ri's mother	
2000	Nice Man	Na Ahn-sim	
2000	Housewife's Rebellion	Shin Hye-ran	
2001	Well-Known Woman	Woo-jin's mother	
2002	Who's My Love	Nam-su	
2002	Confession	Kang Sook-nyu	
2003	My Fair Lady	Baek Seol-hwa	
2004	Proposal	Woo-kyung fiancé's mother	
2004	Traveling Women	Hye-sook's mother-in-law	
2005	Sad Goodbye	Yoon Jin-hee	
2006	Please Come Back, Soon-ae	Yuh Myung-ja	
2007	Heaven & Earth	Lee Soon-im	
2007	War of Money	Lee Kyeong-ja	
2008	Drama City: "The Secret Only You Don't Know"	Yoon Hye-sook	
2008	Glass Castle	Yoon In-suk	
2008	Hometown Legends	Lady Han	
2008	Aeja's Older Sister, Minja	Park Bok-nyeo	
2008	Single Dad in Love	Lee Wal-soon	
2008	Mom's Dead Upset	Lee Jong-won's mother	
2009	Kyung Sook's Father	Kyung-sook's grandmother	
2009	The Tale of Janghwa and Hongryeon	Tae-yoon's aunt	
2010	Definitely Neighbors	Lee Sun-ok	
2010	Three Sisters	Jang Jang-ae	
2011	A Thousand Kisses	Yum Jung-soon	
2011	Just Like Today	Lee Ok-ja	
2012	Family Portrait	Song Geum-sun	
2012	Dream of the Emperor	Queen Dowager Sado	
2012	Ohlala Couple	Park Bong-sook	
2012	Cheer Up, Mr. Kim!	Oh Ssang-ji	
2014	Mama	Park Nam-soon	
2015	House of Bluebird	Lee Jin-yi	
2016	Yeah, That's How It Is	Ha Myung-ran	
2016	Secrets of Women	Mi-hee	
2018	My Only One	Park Geum-byung	
2020	The World of the Married	Bae Jung-shim	
2020	Homemade Love Story	Lee Choon-seok	
2022	Three Bold Siblings	Choi Mal-soon	
2024	Beauty and Mr. Romantic	Gong Dae-sook	

=== Film ===
Year	Title	Role
1983	The Memo Of A 21-Year-Old	Jae-sun
1985	Carnivorous Animal	Wife
1988	Miri, Mari, Wuri, Duri	Mrs. Oh
1990	Let's Look at the Sky Sometimes	Tae-ho's mother
1990	Our Class Accepts Anyone Regardless Of Grade	Jae-soon
1991	Longing for Love	sun-young's mother
1992	I Want To Live Just Until 20 Years Old	Cho-hee's mother
1997	That Day I Stand Alone	Mrs. Song

== Awards and nominations ==
Name of the award ceremony, year presented, category, nominee of the award, and the result of the nomination
Award ceremony	Year	Category	Result	Ref.
TBC 8th Recruitment Talent	1968	Best New Actress	Won	
Olympic Watercolor Contest	1988	Best Actress in Sports	Won	
Seoul Art Festival Special Selectio	1988	Best Artist	Won	
Mokgu Association Guidance Exhibition	1990	Best Artist	Nominated	
