= My Secret Hotel =

- Promotional poster
- Genre: Romance, Comedy, Mystery
- Written by: Kim Do-hyun; Kim Ye-ri
- Directed by: Hong Jong-chan
- Starring: Yoo In-na; Jin Yi-han; Namkoong Min; Lee Young-eun
- Country of origin: South Korea
- Original language: Korean
- No. of episodes: 16

Production
- Executive producers: Park Ho-sik; Yoon Young-ha
- Producers: Hang Jun-hyuk; Lee Sung-hoon
- Production location: Korea
- Production company: Verdi Media

Original release
- Network: tvN
- Release: 18 August – 14 October 2014

My Secret Hotel (Korean: 마이 시크릿 호텔) is a 2014 South Korean mystery-romantic comedy television series starring Yoo In-na, Jin Yi-han, Namkoong Min and Lee Young-eun. It aired on tvN from August 18 to October 14, 2014 on Mondays and Tuesdays at 23:00 (KST) for 16 episodes.

== Synopsis ==
Nam Sang-hyo (Yoo In-na) is the head of the wedding planning division of The Secret Hotel, one of Korea's most elite and luxurious hotels and considered among the top wedding destinations in the country. Optimistic, cheerful and a perfectionist, she works hard and dreams of becoming the hotel's general manager someday. Sang-hyo faces the biggest challenge of her job when her next client turns out to be architect Gu Hae-young (Jin Yi-han), her ex-husband. Seven years ago, Sang-hyo and Hae-young fell madly in love and got hitched in Las Vegas, but because of Hae-young's easy-come-easy-go attitude towards relationships, they fought and broke up. Since the marriage lasted only 100 days, they never filed the paperwork to legally register it, so their short-lived marriage remains a secret.

Meanwhile, Sang-hyo has caught the eye of her boss Jo Sung-gyeom (Namkoong Min), a strict but thoughtful hotel managing director who has all the female employees swooning. But there's also ambitious public relations manager Yeo Eun-joo (Lee Young-eun), who competes with Sang-hyo for both a promotion and Sung-gyeom's heart.

To make matters even more complicated, a murder turns the hotel topsy-turvy. Sung-gyeom may be connected to the case, while Eun-joo attempts to use the circumstances surrounding the murder to get a leg up on the corporate ladder. As Sang-hyo and Hae-young juggle their sudden reunion under awkward circumstances, the exes also get sucked into the murder investigation.

== Cast ==
=== Main ===
- Yoo In-na as Nam Sang-hyo
- Jin Yi-han as Gu Hae-young
- Namkoong Min as Jo Sung-gyeom
- Lee Young-eun as Yeo Eun-joo

=== Supporting ===
- Ha Yeon-joo as Jung Soo-ah, Gu Hae-young's fiancée.
- Choi Jung-won as Yoo Shi-chan, Gu Hae-young's best friend.
- Hwang So-hee as Joo Jung-eun, Gu Hae-young's stalker.
- Kim Jae-seung as Kim Ki-ho, Jung Soo-ah's chauffeur.
- Choi Jung-woo as Lee Moo-yang, general manager of The Secret Hotel.
- Uhm Soo-jung as Yang Kyung-hee, employee of wedding planning division of The Secret Hotel.
- Kim Bo-mi as Heo Young-mi, employee of wedding planning division of The Secret Hotel.
- Choi Tae-hwan as Jang Ki-chul, employee of wedding planning division of The Secret Hotel.
- Go Yoon-hoo as Cha Dong-min, head of security team of The Secret Hotel.
- Ahn Gil-kang as Kim Geum-bo, police detective.
- Lee Kwang-hoon as Simon, Jo Sung-gyeom's secretary.
- Kim Byung-choon as Hwang Dong-bae, employee of wedding planning division of The Secret Hotel, murder victim.
- Ahn Bo-hyun as Sang-hoon.

=== Special appearances ===
- Hong Seok-cheon as Chef Andre Hong
- Hong Jin-young as herself looking for her husband Goong Min who looks like Jo Sung-gyeom (Hong Jin-young and Namkoong Min were pair in reality variety show We Got Married (season 4) aired at same time as this TV series) – ep. 7-8.

== Ratings ==
In this table, the blue numbers represent the lowest ratings and the red numbers represent the highest ratings.

Ep.	Original broadcast date	Average audience share
Ep.	Original broadcast date	AGB Nielsen
Ep.	Original broadcast date	Nationwide
1	August 18, 2014	0.961%
2	August 19, 2014	1.361%
3	August 25, 2014	1.003%
4	August 26, 2014	0.918%
5	September 1, 2014	1.083%
6	September 2, 2014	0.795%
7	September 15, 2014	1.193%
8	September 16, 2014	0.824%
9	September 22, 2014	0.724%
10	September 23, 2014	0.744%
11	September 29, 2014	0.676%
12	September 30, 2014	0.617%
13	October 6, 2014	0.741%
14	October 7, 2014	0.835%
15	October 13, 2014	0.595%
16	October 14, 2014	0.765%
Average		0.865%

- This drama airs on a cable channel/pay TV which normally has a relatively smaller audience compared to free-to-air TV/public broadcasters (KBS, SBS, MBC and EBS).
