= Shadows in the Palace =

- Film poster
- Hangul: 궁녀
- Hanja: 宮女
- RR: Gungnyeo
- MR: Kungnyŏ
- Directed by: Kim Mee-jung
- Written by: Kim Mee-jung; Choi Seok-hwan
- Produced by: Jung Seung-hye; Won Jung-sim; Kang Woo-suk; Lee Joon-ik
- Starring: Park Jin-hee; Yoon Se-ah; Seo Young-hee; Im Jung-eun
- Cinematography: Lee Hyung-deok
- Edited by: Kim Sang-bum; Kim Jae-bum
- Music by: Hwang Sang-jun
- Distributed by: Cinema Service; CJ Entertainment
- Release date: October 18, 2007
- Running time: 118 minutes
- Country: South Korea
- Language: Korean
- Budget: US$3,500,000
- Box office: US$9,723,970

Shadows in the Palace (Korean: 궁녀; RR: Gungnyeo; lit. Kungnyŏ) is a 2007 South Korean period mystery thriller film directed by Kim Mee-jung. The mystery thriller is a fictionalized account of kungnyŏ, court maids during South Korea's Joseon era.

This is Kim Mee-jung's first feature film. She previously worked as part of the directing staff in The King and the Clown (2005), and Shadows in the Palace was filmed on the same set.

== Plot ==
The film is set amongst a group of gungnyeo, or palace women in Korea during the Joseon period, and is primarily about the hidden dynamics that unfold between them. Sworn into secrecy, submission, and celibacy, the women of the palace officially devote their lives to the well-being of the royal family. Currently, the kingdom has no heir to the throne, and at such a time, the royal concubine Hee-bin (Yoon Se-ah) has given birth to a son. The queen mother wishes for the queen to adopt the child as her own, but Hee-bin hesitates proceeding with this, fearing she will be disposed of once the adoption is official.

One morning, as the court maids go about their work, one of them, Wol-ryung (Seo Young-hee), also Hee-bin's most trusted maid, is found dead, hanging from the rafters of the palace roof. Initially assuming it to be suicide, Chun-ryung (Park Jin-hee), the royal medic, discovers as she proceeds with the autopsy that Wol-ryung was actually strangled. She also discovers that there are signs that the maid had given birth at some time in the past, which would have been absolutely forbidden under palace rules. Ignoring orders from her superiors to wrap up the case quickly, Chun-ryung sets off in search of answers.

Amidst a tangled web involving suspicion of Wol-ryung's involvement in an affair with a teacher at the nearby school, the torture of a mute court maid, a beheading, and finally the records of the king's nightly visits to his concubine, an elaborate scheme spearheaded by Hee-bin's advisor transpires, where Wol-ryung was chosen to bear the crown prince, and later murdered to hide the truth of the baby's origin. When exposed, the advisor imprisons Chun-ryung, overpowers Hee-bin and makes off with the baby. She is however intercepted in the forest by the ghost of Wol-ryung, and is murdered. The ghost later also visits the royal palace, and kills the queen mother, thus removing the last obstacle between the crown prince and the throne.

The baby is later discovered in the forest by Chun-ryung. The next day, as the palace women mourn the death of the queen mother in white robes, they simultaneously also witness the coronation of the new prince in the arms of Hee-bin and the transfer of power to new hands.

== Cast ==
- Park Jin-hee as Chun-ryung
- Yoon Se-ah as Hee-bin
- Seo Young-hee as Wol-ryung
- Im Jung-eun as Ok-jin
- Jeon Hae-jin as Jung-ryul
- Kim Sung-ryung as Inspector
- Kim Nam-jin as Lee Hyung-ik
- Kim Mi-kyung as gungnyeo Shim
- Nam Jeong-hee as gungnyeo Noh
- Kim Hak-sun as the king
- Lee Yong-yi as gungnyeo Cheon
- Go Seo-hee as the queen
- Chu Kwi-jung as gungnyeo Uhm
- Moon Ka-young as Il-won
- Ye Soo-jung as the queen mother
- Son Young-soon as chief gungyeo
- Park Soo-young as government official
- Han Ye-rin as Sook-young

== Awards and nominations ==
2007 Blue Dragon Film Awards

- Nomination – Best Supporting Actress – Im Jung-eun
- Nomination – Best New Director – Kim Mee-jung
- Nomination – Best Lighting – Park Se-mun

2007 Korean Film Awards

- Best New Director – Kim Mee-jung
- Nomination – Best Supporting Actress – Jeon Hye-jin

2007 Women in Film Korea Awards

- Film of the Year

2008 Baeksang Arts Awards

- Nomination – Best New Director – Kim Mee-jung

2008 Buil Film Awards

- Nomination – Best Supporting Actress – Seo Young-hee
- Nomination – Best New Director – Kim Mee-jung
- Nomination – Best Lighting – Park Se-mun

2008 Chunsa Film Art Awards

- Best Lighting – Park Se-mun

2008 Grand Bell Awards

- Best Lighting – Park Se-mun
- Nomination – Best Actress – Park Jin-hee
- Nomination – Best Supporting Actress – Kim Sung-ryung
- Nomination – Best New Director – Kim Mee-jung
- Nomination – Best Cinematography – Lee Hyung-deok
- Nomination – Best Art Direction – Lee Ha-jun
- Nomination – Best Lighting – Park Se-mun
- Nomination – Best Costume Design – Shim Hyun-sub
- Nomination – Best Sound – Oh Seong-jin

2008 Golden Cinematography Awards

- Best Actress – Park Jin-hee

2008 Fantasia Festival

- Best Actress – Park Jin-hee
