= The Woman Who Still Wants to Marry =

2010 South Korean TV series

- Promotional poster
- Also known as: Still, Marry Me
- Genre: Romance
- Written by: Kim In-young
- Directed by: Kim Min-shik
- Starring: Park Jin-hee; Kim Bum; Uhm Ji-won; Wang Bit-na
- Country of origin: South Korea
- Original language: Korean
- No. of episodes: 16

Production
- Executive producer: Go Dong-sun
- Producer: Park Chang-shik
- Running time: 60 minutes
- Production company: Kim Jong-hak Production

Original release
- Network: MBC TV
- Release: January 20 – March 11, 2010

Related
- The Woman Who Wants to Marry (MBC, 2004)

The Woman Who Still Wants to Marry (Korean: 아직도 결혼하고 싶은 여자; RR: Ajikdo gyeolhonhago sipeun yeoja; also known as Still, Marry Me) is a 2010 South Korean romantic comedy television series that revolves around three thirtysomething career women in their quest for true love. It stars Park Jin-hee, Uhm Ji-won, Wang Bit-na, and Kim Bum. It aired on MBC from January 20 to March 11, 2010, on Wednesday and Thursday at 21:55 for 16 episodes.

== Plot ==
34-year-old broadcast journalist Lee Shin-young (Park Jin-hee) and wants to find love, but finds it hard to stay positive when she is faced with high workplace pressure and a string of failed relationships. Just when it seems like her chances may pass, Shin-young meets a musician ten years younger than her (Kim Bum), and her former fiancé (Lee Pil-mo) comes back to rekindle the flame. Korean-English translator Da-jung (Uhm Ji-won) desperately wants to get married within one year. Restaurant consultant Bu-ki (Wang Bit-na) is done with the marriage game. She broke off her engagement, studied overseas, and is satisfied on her own terms as an efficient, sophisticated woman.

== Cast ==
=== Main characters ===
- Park Jin-hee as Lee Shin-young
- Kim Bum as Ha Min-jae
- Uhm Ji-won as Jung Da-jung
- Wang Bit-na as Kim Bu-ki
- Choi Cheol-ho as Na Ban-suk
- Lee Pil-mo as Yoon Sang-woo
- Park Ji-young as Choi Sang-mi

=== Supporting characters ===
- Kim Yong-hee as Choi Myung-suk
- Ahn Hye-kyung as Jang Hye-jin
- Park Hyo-jun as Hee-dong
- Jeon Se-hong as Jeon Se-ri
- Jung Won-joong as Director Buk
- Chun Woo-hee as Shin-young's junior colleague
- Baek Il-seob as Ban-suk's father
- Jung Soo-young as Sang-woo's colleague
- Jo Han-sun as Shin-young's ex-fiancé (cameo)
- Min Ah-ryung as ex-fiancé's girlfriend
- Im Chang-jung as Jerry Oh (cameo)
- Danny Ahn as Bu-ki's ex-boyfriend (cameo)
- Park Chul-min as psychic (cameo)
- Kim Sung-hoon as gangster
- Na Young-hee as Shin-young's fan
- Kim Min-shik as Director Kim Min-shik (cameo, ep 12)
- Gook Ji-yun as Oh Se-na (cameo, ep 15)

== Episode ratings ==
| Date | Episode | Nationwide | Seoul Area |
|---|---|---|---|
| 2010-01-20 | 1 | 4.7% | 9.2% |
| 2010-01-21 | 2 | 4.6% | 8.4% |
| 2010-01-27 | 3 | 4.7% | 8.9% |
| 2010-01-28 | 4 | 4.2% | 8.2% |
| 2010-02-03 | 5 | 5.7% | 8.6% |
| 2010-02-04 | 6 | 5.3% | 8.7% |
| 2010-02-10 | 7 | 8.3% | 8.1% |
| 2010-02-11 | 8 | 8.3% | 8.0% |
| 2010-02-17 | 9 | 8.0% | 8.3% |
| 2010-02-18 | 10 | 8.6% | 8.0% |
| 2010-02-24 | 11 | 10.1% | 10.1% |
| 2010-02-25 | 12 | 4.7% | 9.9% |
| 2010-03-03 | 13 | 9.0% | 9.1% |
| 2010-03-04 | 14 | 8.3% | 8.2% |
| 2010-03-10 | 15 | 9.3% | 8.9% |
| 2010-03-11 | 16 | 8.9% | 8.4% |
| Average | | 7.0% | 8.6% |

Source: TNS Media Korea
