= Kim Ha-eun =

South Korean actress (born 1984)

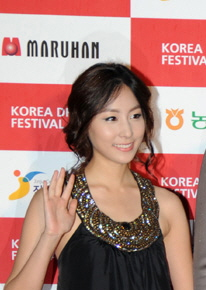
- Kim in 2010
- Born: Kim Hyun-jin; January 3, 1984 (age 42); South Korea
- Education: Dongduk Women's University - Broadcasting
- Occupation: Actress
- Years active: 2004-present
- Agent(s): JYP Entertainment (2007–2008); 4Doors Entertainment (present)

Korean name
- Hangul: 김하은
- Hanja: 金夏恩
- RR: Gim Haeun
- MR: Kim Haŭn

Birth name
- Hangul: 김현진
- RR: Gim Hyeonjin
- MR: Kim Hyŏnjin

Kim Ha-eun (Korean: 김하은; born January 3, 1984), born Kim Hyun-jin (김현진), is a South Korean actress. She is best known for her roles in the television series Conspiracy in the Court, and The Slave Hunters.

She is also the CEO of an online clothing store (301호 고양이).

== Filmography ==
=== Television series ===
Year	Title	Role	Ref.
2000	Days of Delight	Child	
2007	Drama City	Bit part	
2007	Conspiracy in the Court	Lee Na-young	
2007	Drama City	Kwak	
2008	Single Dad in Love	Jo Kyung-ah	
2008	Hometown Legends	Lee Seo-ok	
2010	The Slave Hunters	Seol-hwa	
2010	Ang Shim Jung	Min Chung-seol	
2011	The Thorn Birds	Yang Mi-ryun	
2011	Pianissimo - Happy Fiction		
2011	Kimchi Family	Ji-hyun (guest)	
2012	God of War	Choon-shim	
2013	Jang Ok-jung, Living by Love	Queen Ingyeong	
2013	Drama Festival	Geum-hong	
2015	Miss Mamma Mia	Kang Bong-sook	

=== Film ===
Year	Title	Role	Notes	Ref.
2004	Temptation of Wolves	Lee Na-yoon		
2005	Love in Magic	Gu Mi-young		
2006	APT	Woman who committed suicide		
2012	Juvenile Offender	Juvenile probation counselor		
2014	On the Road		Short film	

== Awards and nominations ==
Year	Award	Category	Nominated work	Result
2010	KBS Drama Awards	Best New Actress	The Slave Hunters	Nominated
2011	6th Cable TV Broadcasting Awards	Star Award	Ang Shim Jung	Won
