= Happiness in the Wind =

- Promotional poster
- Also known as: Good Days When the Wind Blows; Windy But Pleasant Day; Fine Windy Day
- Genre: Romance; Family; Drama; Comedy
- Written by: Lee Duk-jae
- Directed by: Lee Duk-gun
- Starring: Kim So-eun; Jin Yi-han
- Country of origin: South Korea
- No. of episodes: 173

Production
- Producer: Moon Bo-hyun
- Running time: 30 minutes

Original release
- Network: KBS1
- Release: February 1 – October 1, 2010

Happiness in the Wind (Korean: 바람 불어 좋은날; RR: Baram bureo joeunnal; lit. 'A Good Day for the Wind to Blow') is a 2010 South Korean television series starring Kim So-eun and Jin Yi-han. The daily drama aired on KBS1 from February 1 to October 1, 2010, from Mondays to Fridays at 20:25 for 173 episodes.

== Synopsis ==
Leading the cast is Kwon Oh-bok (Kim So-eun - in her first ever leading role in a drama series), a talented 19-year-old girl who aspires to be a recognized illustrator and allows herself very little in terms of being swayed by any trials or tribulations. Wanting to find her father who abandoned her when Oh-bok's mother had died 10 years earlier, she heads to Seoul where she earns a living selling her handmade merchandise out of a street-side stall. Very soon, she clashes with Jang Dae-han (Jin Yi-han), an irascible but lonely-at-heart man who also happens to be the head designer for Well-Being Dairy, one of South Korea's largest dairy product companies; incidentally it is also here where Oh-bok later succeeds in gaining employment as an illustrator. Their chance meeting initiates an "ongoing battle" which eventually unfolds into a somewhat love triangle between them and her old hometown oppa, Ki-chul (Kang Eun-tak).

As the drama continues, Oh-bok gets to know Dae-han's younger brother, Jang Min-guk (Lee Hyun-jin), a drifter, upon saving his life when she thought he was trying to commit suicide. And just as Dae-han opens up his feelings to Oh-bok, his first love and the mother of his son, Choi Mi-ran (Lee Sung-min), the only daughter to a rival food company who had moved to the States for an arranged marriage, returns to Korea as a divorcee to reconnect with her life with him and their son. But it is already too late as Dae-han and their son already have Oh-bok in their hearts.

== Cast ==
=== Kwon family ===
- Kim So-eun as Kwon Oh-bok

A 19-year-old talented girl who refuses to give up her dream of becoming a top illustrator, notwithstanding being left to care for herself. Because she grew up poor (and is still struggling), she is extremely frugal, but maintains an optimistic outlook on things. Oh-bok has nothing that she can call her own in her lifetime, not even the little room nor the bed she shares with her good friend, Han Ki-chul. However, her hot temper flares whenever she witnesses any injustices.

- Jung Seung-ho as Kwon Yi-moon

Oh-bok's father. He has an irresponsible nature and there's nothing at all that he does right. Although he always tries to treat his daughter well, he is nothing but a burden to Oh-bok whenever he is around.

=== Jang family ===
- Na Moon-hee as Na Kkeut-soon (grandmother)

She is a kind and active grandmother who ended up living next door to a lifelong friend whose son had died.

- Kang In-duk as Jang Jung-nam (father)

Kkeut-soon's son. A warm and kind-hearted man who works as a drug administration manager, he cannot tolerate dishonesty. He finds himself getting into an unexpected battle because of his mother.

- Yoon Mi-ra as Yoon Sun-hee (mother)

Jung-nam's wife. An easy-going, wise and liberal mother to all her kids, she suddenly suffers from fatigue because of her mother in-law's actions.

- Jin Yi-han as Jang Dae-han

The eldest son of the family, Dae-han is a design team leader who graduated from a top university and has a successful career. But he has a painful past experience with love, and is currently raising his six-year-old son on his own. He lives with his family in a three-generation house and has to deal with the problems that are caused by his siblings and grandmother along with his parents. He thinks that he has lost all hope in love until Oh-bok appears.

- Seo Hyo-rim as Jang Man-se

Man-se is a materialistic young woman with a princess complex who models for an internet shopping mall. She has always thought that she had to marry a rich man to enjoy a good life, and is even willing to do plastic surgery to reach her goal. Man-se is interested in Kang Sang-jun, a playboy who is the only son of a businessman, and she struggles to get his attention.

- Lee Hyun-jin as Jang Min-guk

Min-guk is Dae-han's younger brother. Curious, imaginative and always dreaming of making it rich, Jang Min-guk has always been the problematic son in the Jang family. Since his freshman year in high school, he's had a crush on his married teacher, Lee Kang-hee.

- Kang Han-byeol as Jang Dok-rip

His mother, Choi Mi-ran, abandoned him when she married another man. Raised by his father Dae-han, he gets caught in the middle of a conflict when his mother returns.

(Note: The given names of the three Jang children, "Dae-han", "Min-guk" and "Man-se" combined form a phrase that sounds like the exclamation "Long Live the Republic of Korea!")

=== Kang family ===
- Kim Sung-hwan as Kang In-soo (father)

Well-Being Dairy's figurehead president. He has the timid and gentle soul of a good man. Although he's rich, he doesn't look down on people. But because he's scared of his wife, he can't bring himself to go against her even when he knows that she is at fault.

- Na Young-hee as Cha Yeon-shil (mother)

In-soo's wife is the actual person managing their family company, and is thus Dae-han's direct supervisor. Always proudly confident and capable, she believes in her son, Sang-jun. But she suffers from a painful betrayal and becomes bitterly disappointed with him. She doesn't think Man-se, or any other young woman, should distract Sang-jun from becoming successor to the company.

- Kang Ji-sub as Kang Sang-jun

As the second generation heir to his family company, Sang-jun has never lacked for female company due to his good looks and family background. But when he meets Man-se accidentally, he is charmed by her.

=== Lee family ===
- Kim Mi-sook as Lee Kang-hee

Her husband died years ago when she was still teaching Min-guk in high school, and they never had any children. Because she still can't forget her deceased husband, she rejects Min-guk's declarations of love.

- Kwon Oh-hyun as Seo Dong-shik (brother-in-law)

A schemer with designs on easy money, he and his family live off the money earned by Kang-hee.

- Ahn Hye-kyung as Kim Nam-suk (Dong-shik's wife)

She is always thinking of ways to get money from Kang-hee.

- Ju Hye-rin as Seo Hyo-ri (Dong-shik's daughter)

A fun-loving girl, who cares deeply for her aunt. She is Dok-rip's "girlfriend" and best friend.

=== Extended cast ===
- Clara Lee (Note: Credited as Lee Sung-min.) as Choi Mi-ran

Jang Dok-rip's biological mother. She is the only daughter of the owner of Green Dairy, Well-Being's bitter rival. She found herself with an unexpected pregnancy when she and Dae-han were both still students. However, her parents sent her to the United States for an arranged marriage after forcing her to give up her child. She comes back to Korea six years later after getting a divorce, hoping to get back together with Dae-han and her son. But Oh-bok is already in their lives.

- Kang Eun-tak as Han Ki-chul

He is an upright man who is warm and tender on the inside. As Oh-bok's childhood friend and big brother figure, he rescues and helps her whenever she needs someone by her side. But by the time he discovers that he has fallen for the cheerful Oh-bok, her heart had already moved on to someone else.

- Jung Da-young as Ha Sol-ji

She is a smart orphan who is tough and behaves crazier than anyone else around her. Her heart beats faster whenever she sees Min-guk, despite knowing he only has eyes for Kang-hee. But she's not going to give up on her love just like that, no matter how frustrating it might get.
