= Stray Dogs (2014 film) =

- Theatrical poster
- Directed by: Ha Won-jun
- Written by: Ha Won-jun; Kim Su-yeon; Ahn Jong-jun
- Starring: Kim Jeong-hoon; Cha Ji-heon; Myung Kae-nam
- Cinematography: Yun Jong-ho
- Release date: March 23, 2014 (South Korea)
- Running time: 99 minutes
- Country: South Korea
- Language: Korean

Stray Dogs (Korean: 들개들; RR: Deulgaedeul) is a 2014 South Korean thriller film starring Kim Jeong-hoon, Cha Ji-heon and Myung Kae-nam. It is co-written and directed by first-time director Ha Won-jun.

== Plot ==
While searching for him, his car breaks down and he is stuck at the village.

Although the village seems peaceful, it is hiding a hideous secret – a young woman Kim Eun-hee (Cha Ji-heon), a long time resident, has inadvertently become the sexual plaything for the perverted and pathetic elder village men. When Yoo-joon tries to help Eun-hee, he finds himself on a violent collision course with the locals and the village chief Jang Gi-no (Myung Kae-nam).

== Cast ==
- Kim Jeong-hoon as So Yoo-joon
- Cha Ji-heon as Kim Eun-hee
- Hwang Young-hee as Ham Bok-soon
- Myung Kae-nam as Jang Gi-no
- Lee Jae-po as Han Dong-goo
- Jo Duk-je as Choi Yong-gil
- Kim Seong-gi as Lee Jong-gook
