= Padam Padam (TV series) =

2011–2012 South Korean television series

- Promotional poster
- Also known as: Padam Padam... The Music of Their Hearts
- Hangul: 빠담빠담... 그와 그녀의 심장박동소리
- Lit.: Padam Padam... The Sound of His and Her Heartbeats
- RR: Ppadamppadam... geuwa geunyeoui simjang bakdong sori
- MR: Ppadamppadam... kŭwa kŭnyŏŭi simjang paktong sori
- Genre: Romance; Fantasy; Crime
- Written by: Noh Hee-kyung
- Directed by: Kim Kyu-tae
- Starring: Jung Woo-sung; Han Ji-min; Kim Bum
- Country of origin: South Korea
- Original language: Korean
- No. of episodes: 20

Production
- Executive producers: Yoo Jung-joon; Lee Young-jun; Lee Jung-hee; Ahn Hyeong-jo
- Producer: Cho Joon-hyeong
- Production location: Korea
- Production companies: MI Inc. Master Works Media

Original release
- Network: JTBC
- Release: 5 December 2011 – 7 February 2012

Padam Padam (Korean: 빠담빠담... 그와 그녀의 심장박동소리) is a 2011 South Korean television series starring Jung Woo-sung, Han Ji-min, and Kim Bum. The romance / fantasy series was written by Noh Hee-kyung, and the title is a reference to a 1951 French song by Edith Piaf, an onomatopoeia expressing the sound of a heartbeat. It was one of the inaugural dramas on newly launched cable channel JTBC, and aired from December 5, 2011 to February 7, 2012 on Mondays and Tuesdays at 20:45 (KST) for 20 episodes.

== Synopsis ==
A convict named Yang Kang-chil (Jung Woo-sung) serves 16 years in prison for a murder he didn't commit. His innocent nature is protected by his best friend and "guardian angel" Gook-soo (Kim Bum). Prior to his release he experiences a near-death event and only survives thanks to a miracle. Gook-soo explains that Kang-chil will have three near-death miracles and he will only survive them if he learns from the experience.

After his release, Kang-chil becomes a carpenter and falls in love with Jang Ji-na (Han Ji-min), a veterinarian described as a "selfish woman". Despite her selfishness, Ji-na is irrevocably drawn to Kang-chil and falls deeply in love with him. However, things take a turn for the worse when it is revealed that Ji-na's uncle was the victim in Kang-chil's murder case, and Ji-na is the daughter of a police inspector who participated in his arrest and who, driven by the thirst for revenge, he goes after Kang-chil again when he knows that he has been freed. On the other hand, Ji-na's mother had always been convinced of Kang-chil's innocence and for years had gone to visit him in prison, and she had even contacted a lawyer, but he dies upon returning from a visit to prison and this causes the family to blame Kang-chil for said death as well. In order to prove his innocence, Kang-chil desperately seeks evidence that will bring the real murderer, Park Chan-gul (Jun-seong Kim), to justice and also save his relationship with Ji-na.

== Cast ==
- Jung Woo-sung as Yang Kang-chil
- Han Ji-min as Jung Ji-na
  - Kim So-hyun as teenage Ji-na
- Kim Bum as Lee Gook-soo
- Choi Tae-joon as Im Jung (Kang-chil's son who was raised by his mother's friend)
- Kim Min-kyung as Min Hyo-sook (Kang-chil's ex-girlfriend)
- Lee Jae-woo as Kim Young-cheol
- Na Moon-hee as Kim Mi-ja (Kang-chil's mother)
- Jang Hang-sun as Detective Jung (Ji-na's father)
- Kim Sung-ryung as Ji-na's mother
- Yoon Joo-sang as Prison warden Kim
- Kim Hyung-bum as Oh Yong-hak
- Jun-seong Kim as Park Chan-gul
- Kim Kyu-chul as Prosecutor Joo
- Park Jung-woo as Jin-goo
- Park Sang-hyun as Yang Kang-woo (Kang-chil's brother)
- Lee Ha-yool as Lee Yoo-jin
- Jeon Gook-hwan

== Ratings ==
Average TV viewership ratings (nationwide)
Ep.	Original broadcast date	Average audience share (Nielsen Korea)
1	December 5, 2011	1.601%
2	December 6, 2011	1.515%
3	December 12, 2011	1.613%
4	December 13, 2011	1.496%
5	December 19, 2011	2.151%
6	December 20, 2011	1.802%
7	December 26, 2011	2.073%
8	December 27, 2011	2.186%
9	January 2, 2012	1.782%
10	January 3, 2012	1.480%
11	January 9, 2012	1.480%
12	January 10, 2012	1.420%
13	January 16, 2012	1.825%
14	January 17, 2012	1.544%
15	January 23, 2012	1.295%
16	January 24, 2012	1.452%
17	January 30, 2012	1.402%
18	January 31, 2012	1.898%
19	February 6, 2012	1.601%
20	February 7, 2012	1.878%
Average		1.675%
In the table above, the blue numbers represent the lowest ratings and the red numbers represent the highest ratings.; This series aired on a cable channel/pay TV which normally has a relatively smaller audience compared to free-to-air TV/public broadcasters (KBS, SBS, MBC and EBS).
