= Choi Jung-won (singer) =

South Korean singer and actor

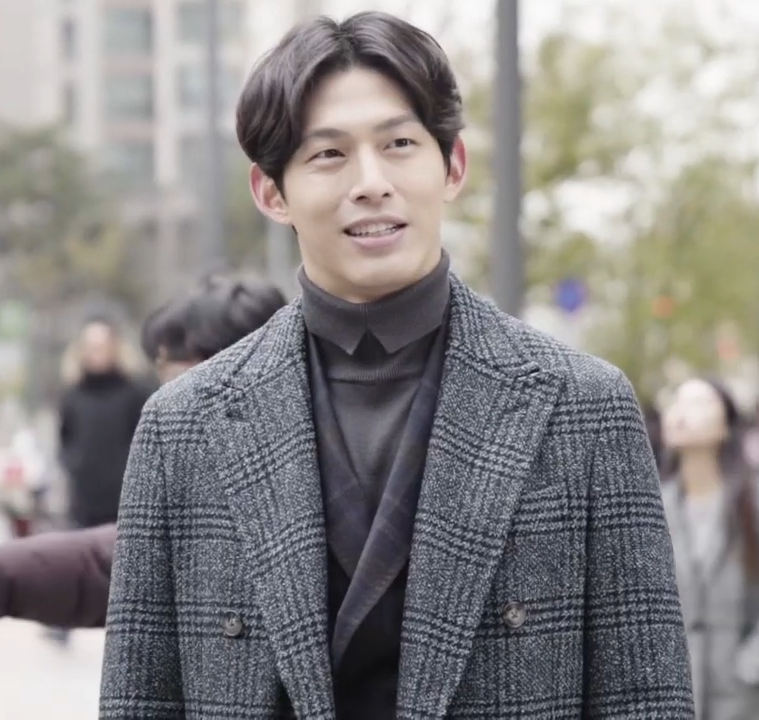
- Choi in December 2017
- Born: May 1, 1981 (age 45); Seoul
- Years active: 1999–present
- Agents: Will Entertainment; Flyup Entertainment

Korean name
- Hangul: 최정원
- Hanja: 崔正元
- RR: Choe Jeongwon
- MR: Ch'oe Chŏngwŏn

Choi Jung-won (born May 1, 1981) is a South Korean singer and actor. He initially rose to fame as a member of South Korean duo UN debuting with the single "Voice Mail" in 2000. After the duo disbanded in 2005, his fame increased as an actor.

== Filmography ==
=== Television series ===
Year	Title	Role	Notes	Ref.
2004	Between Agasshi and Ajumma			
2005	Beating Heart	Jung-hyun		
2012	Sent From Heaven	Geum Mo-rae		
2013	Empress Ki	Gongmin of Goryeo		
2014	My Secret Hotel	Yoo Si-chan		
2014	Healer	Lee Jun-bin		
2015	The Family is Coming	Han Sang-woo		
2015	A Daughter Just Like You	Ahn Jin-bong		
2015	The Time We Were Not in Love	Joo Ho-joon		
2016	The Shining Eun Soo	Yoon Su-hyeon		
2018	Love Alert	Hwang Jae-min		
2020	The Name	Mo Cheol-woo	Main cast	
2021	She Would Never Know	Ryu Han-Seo		
2022	Curtain Call	Song Hyo-jin's acquaintance	Cameo (Episode 1)	
