= Ghost Doctor =

2022 South Korean fantasy television series

- Promotional poster
- Hangul: 고스트 닥터
- RR: Goseuteu dakteo
- MR: Kosŭt'ŭ takt'ŏ
- Genre: Fantasy; Medical drama
- Created by: Hong Ki-Sung (tvN); Studio Dragon; Plan Production
- Written by: Kim Sun-soo
- Directed by: Boo Seong-cheol
- Starring: Rain; Kim Bum; Uee; Son Na-eun
- Music by: Kim Joon-seok; Jeong Se-rin
- Country of origin: South Korea
- Original language: Korean
- No. of episodes: 16

Production
- Executive producer: Lee Hae-young
- Producers: Moon Seok-Hwan; Oh Kwang-hee; Lee Seung-hoon; Jo A-ra
- Camera setup: Single-camera
- Running time: 60 minutes
- Production companies: Studio Dragon; Bon Factory Worldwide

Original release
- Network: tvN
- Release: January 3 – February 22, 2022

Ghost Doctor (Korean: 고스트 닥터; RR: Goseuteu dakteo is a 2022 South Korean supernatural medical comedy drama television series directed by Boo Seong-cheol and starring Rain, Kim Bum, Uee, and Son Na-eun. The series revolves around two doctors from different backgrounds and with different skills. It aired from January 3 to February 22, 2022, on tvN's Mondays and Tuesdays at 22:30 (KST) for 16 episodes. It is available for streaming on TVING, iQiyi, and Netflix.

== Synopsis ==
The series revolves around two doctors from extreme backgrounds, who have complete opposite personalities and medical skills: Cha Young-min (Rain) is a genius doctor and a high-skilled cardiothoracic surgeon, but is arrogant and selfish. Go Seung-tak (Kim-Bum), who possesses excellent medical knowledge, is hindered by his lack of surgical knowledge and fear of performing surgery. One day, Young Min gets involved in an unexpected case, and due to this, his spirit possesses Seung-tak's body.

== Cast and characters ==
=== Main ===
- Rain as Cha Young-min: 38 years old, a genius cardiothoracic surgeon who has a golden hand that can handle difficult surgeries. He is the best doctor of Eunsang Foundation Hospital.
- Kim Bum as Go Seung-tak: 28 years old, 1st year thoracic surgery resident who is a "silver spoon" resident in the hospital, as his grandfather is the founder of the hospital, and his mother is the current chairman of the foundation. He has excellent theoretical knowledge but is practically clumsy at work.
- Uee as Jang Se-jin: 38 years old, Cha Young-min's ex-girlfriend. She had to leave for overseas due to her father a decade ago without having the chance to explain to Cha Young-min. This made Young-min disappointed since he believed she left due to having found a rich father and she no longer cared for him. She is an overseas genius neurosurgeon and was raised by a single mother. Reconciled with Young-min in the end.
- Son Na-eun as Oh Soo-jeong: 28 years old, a highly talented emergency room intern who is straightforward at work and wants to be a cardiothoracic surgeon. She is Go Seung-tak's best friend and love interest, and the granddaughter of Oh Joo-Myung, who becomes the ghost "Tes" after his death.

=== Supporting ===
- Sung Dong-il as Tes/Oh Joo-myung: Oh Soo-jeong's grandfather. A genius and compassionate cardiothoracic surgeon before he died in his 60's. Twenty years after his death, he still wanders the hospital as a ghost, helping the patients by possessing the hospital staff, including Cha Young-min while in his residency.

==== Hospital people ====
- Tae In-ho as Han Seung-won: in his mid 40's, executive director and Go Seung-tak's older cousin. He is a two-faced man with an invisible dagger inside, and the main villain.
- Park Chul-min as Ban Tae-sik: in his early 50's, Chief of Thoracic Surgery. In front of other doctors, he shouts "I was a genius in my old days", but in front of Cha Young-min, he always gets smaller.
- Ko Sang-ho as Ahn Tae-hyun: 34 years old, 4th year as a thoracic surgery fellow and a loyal junior of Cha Young-min who betrays him after getting bribed by Jang Min ho.
- Ahn Tae-hwan as Kim Jae-won: 29 years old, a third year cardiothoracic surgeon who has a simple and clear personality. A kind and warm person who values every life, and likes Go Seung-tak.
- Kim Jae-yong as Lee Seon-ho: 30 years old, 4th year thoracic surgery resident. He was born and raised in a middle-class family.
- Seo Ji-young as Go Seong-hye: chairman of the Medical Foundation
- Choi Seok-won as Hun-gil: a coma ghost who dreams of becoming an actor, Bo-mi's love interest
- Yoon So-hee as Im Bo-mi: a coma ghost who feels pressured by her mother to be a professor, Hun-gil's love interest
- Han Seung-hyun as Hwang Guk-chan: a coma ghost whose family owns a walnut cookie shop
- Yoon Da-kyung as Seong Mi-ran: Go Seung-tak's mother. A person with two sides: a kind mother for Seung-tak, and a cold-hearted and stubborn president of a medical foundation.
- Hwang Seok-jeong as Mrs. Kim: hospital's custodian. She has the unique ability to meet various people in the hospital.
- Park So-eun as Nurse Jung.
- Shin Soo-hang as emergency room doctor.
- Kim Jung-hwan as doctor.
- Baek Ik-nam as doctor (ep. 1).
- Jeon Se-yong as internship interviewer (ep. 1).
- Bae Ki-bum as OR anesthesiologist (ep. 1).

==== Others ====
- Lee Tae-sung as Jang Min-ho: in his early 40's, son of Chairman Jang Myung-duk. He is a cold-hearted man who takes advantage of his father's illness to become the heir to the group.
- Lee Moon-soo as Chairman Jang Kwang-deok: 70 years old, chairman of the Chunmyung group who has cardiac sarcoma and is in need of surgery.
- Woo Yong-hee as paramedic (ep. 1).
- Park Sung-kyun as medical school professor (ep. 1).
- Kim Woo-jin as paramedic (ep. 1).
- Lee Kyu-hyun as mysterious motorcycle man.
- Kim Jung-woon as Jang Min-ho's secretary.
- Sugar Glider as Cha Mandu.

=== Special appearance ===
- Ahn Hee-yeon as Lee Ji-woo/ Jessica.

== Production ==
On March 17, 2021 it was reported that Rain would make a comeback with the TV series Ghost Doctor, directed by Bu Seong-cheol, written by Kim Seon-sun, and produced by Bone Factory. He last appeared in the 2019 series Welcome 2 Life. The cast lineup was confirmed on November 8, 2021. On November 2, Son Na-eun posted a photo from the filming site.

On February 6, 2022, it was reported that filming had been completed.

== Original soundtrack ==
Ghost Doctor

Soundtrack album by Various
- Released: 2022
- Genre: Soundtrack
- Languages: Korean; English
- Labels: Genie Music; Stone Music Entertainment

=== Part 1 ===
Released on January 19, 2022
No.	Title	Lyrics	Music	Artist	Length
1.	"Fly Away"	December 32, Ruid (Llwyd)	Kim Tae-young	Shinwoo (B1A4)	3:45
2.	"Fly Away" (instrumental)				3:45

=== Part 2 ===
Released on January 26, 2022
No.	Title	Lyrics	Music	Artist	Length
1.	"My heart is everything to me" (내겐 전부인 마음인 걸요)	KEHN	KEHN	K.Will	3:17
2.	"My heart is everything to me" (instrumental)				3:17

=== Part 3 ===
Released on February 1, 2022
No.	Title	Lyrics	Music	Artist	Length
1.	"Romance" (연애)	Kim Hyun-cheol	Kim Hyun-cheol	Sondia	4:07
2.	"Romance" (instrumental)				4:07

=== Part 4 ===
Released on February 8, 2022
No.	Title	Lyrics	Music	Artist	Length
1.	"You Better Not"	December 32, Ruid (Llwyd)	Kim Tae-young	Donggeon & Jaeyun (TO1)	2:44
2.	"You Better Not" (instrumental)				2:44

=== Part 5 ===
Released on February 22, 2022
No.	Title	Lyrics	Music	Artist	Length
1.	"Make a Smile For Me" (웃어주기로 해)	SNNNY	SNNNY	Yubin (Oh My Girl)	4:08
2.	"Make a Smile For Me" (instrumental)				4:08

== Viewership ==
Ghost Doctor : South Korea viewers per episode (millions)

Season	Episode number																Average
Season	1	2	3	4	5	6	7	8	9	10	11	12	13	14	15	16	Average
1	1.111	1.107	1.347	1.455	1.384	1.356	1.572	1.581	0.988	1.375	1.200	1.475	1.105	1.517	1.383	1.947	1.369

Source: Audience measurement performed nationwide by Nielsen Korea

Average TV viewership ratings
Ep.	Original broadcast date	Average audience share (Nielsen Korea)	
Ep.	Original broadcast date	Nationwide	Seoul
1	January 3, 2022	4.432% (1st)	4.863% (1st)
2	January 4, 2022	4.507% (1st)	4.712% (1st)
3	January 10, 2022	5.628% (1st)	6.673% (1st)
4	January 11, 2022	5.711% (1st)	6.376% (1st)
5	January 17, 2022	5.514% (1st)	5.958% (1st)
6	January 18, 2022	5.462% (1st)	6.048% (1st)
7	January 24, 2022	6.202% (1st)	6.510% (1st)
8	January 25, 2022	6.597% (1st)	7.121% (1st)
9	January 31, 2022	4.024% (1st)	4.145% (1st)
10	February 1, 2022	4.747% (3rd)	5.345% (3rd)
11	February 7, 2022	4.914% (1st)	5.203% (1st)
12	February 8, 2022	5.709% (1st)	6.002% (1st)
13	February 14, 2022	4.717% (1st)	4.780% (1st)
14	February 15, 2022	6.282% (1st)	6.717% (1st)
15	February 21, 2022	5.309% (1st)	5.155% (1st)
16	February 22, 2022	7.953% (1st)	8.394% (1st)
Average		5.482%	5.875%
In the table above, the blue numbers represent the lowest ratings and the red numbers represent the highest ratings.; This drama airs on a cable channel/pay TV which normally has a relatively smaller audience compared to free-to-air TV/public broadcasters (KBS, SBS, MBC and EBS).

== Accolades ==
Award ceremony	Year	Category	Nominee	Result	Ref.
Korea Drama Awards	2022	Top Excellence Award, Actor	Kim Bum	Won	
