= UN (band) =

South Korean pop band

- Also known as: United N-generation
- Origin: South Korea
- Genres: R&B, pop, k-pop
- Years active: 2000–2005
- Labels: NH Planning; Doremi Media; Bay
- Members: Choi Jung-won (최정원); Kim Jeong-hoon (김정훈)

UN (also known as United N-generation) was a South Korean musical group under NH Media (then NH Planning). It consisted of two members: Choi Jung-won and Kim Jeong-hoon. They released five albums from 2000 to 2005. "For a Lifetime", a single from their first album, was their first significant hit.

== Information ==
In 1999, the two members, both from top universities in Korea, formed UN but it was not until June 2000 that they released their first album.

In September 2005, five years after their debut and five albums later, their management agency, Laful Entertainment, announced that the duo would disband after the expiration of their contract.

== Discography ==
=== Album ===
Album #	Album Information	Track listing
1	United 'n' - Generation: Released: July 31, 2000; Label: NH Media	Track listing: 1. Intro; 2. Voice Mail; 3. 휴식 holiday 4. You are the one 5. Take it higher 6. 가 end 7. 평생 forever 8. 내 마음을 뺐어봐 Look steal my heart 9. 애원 appeal 10. 미움없는 이별 Hatred is not goodbye 11. You are the one (inst.); 12. Outro
2	Traveling You: Released: July 11, 2001; Label: NH Media	Track listing Disc 1: 1. 여름의 끝에서 At the end of the summer 2. 파도 wave 3. Coin; 4. 40 Days; 5. 선물 Gift; 6. 착각 Mistaken; 7. 후(後)...오늘도 버릇처럼 그녀 생각을 하다 After (Rear) ... Today is her habit of thinking like 8. Wait for me 9. We'll be together 10. Every Night; 11. 선물 (inst.) Gift (inst.); Disc 2: 1. M/Voice V-Mail, 평생, You Are The One; 2. Self Camera; 3. Photo Gallery; 4. Music Box; 5. Screen Saver; 6. Profile; 7. Star Web
3	Extreme Happiness: Released: November 14, 2002; Label: NH Media	Track listing: 1. 전화번호 주면 안되요... I can't give phone numbers ...; 2. 흰눈이 내리면 Get off the white snow 3. 니가 필요해 I Need You; 4. Miracle; 5. 아침 morning 6. Crazy for you 7. 나의 사랑 나의 신부 My Love, My Bride; 8. Tell me by your eyes 9. Full moon 10. 작별 farewell 11. 항해 sail 12. 오늘도 뿌듯한 Today, proud 13. 그대를 보내며 Sent thee 14. 라라라 La La La; 15. Miracle (inst.)
3.5	Sweet & Strong: Released: August 21, 2003; Label: NH Media	Track listing: 1. Feeling - 김정훈; 2. 유리(唯悝) - 비록 슬퍼진다 하더라도 Glass (Wei Kui) - even if they are sad 3. 나의 신부에게 My bride 4. 서약 pledge 5. Thank you 6. 아침 morning 7. 유리(唯悝) - 비록 슬퍼진다 하더라도 (inst.) Glass (Wei Kui) - even if they are sad (inst.); 8. 사랑을 믿어 - 최정원 Believe in Love - Choi Jung-won; 9. 니가 여자로 느껴져 I will feel as a woman 10. 말하자면 as it were 11. Summer story 12. 전화번호 주면 안되요... I can't give phone numbers ...; 13. White Dream in love 14. 사랑을 믿어 (inst.) Believe in Love (inst.)
4	Reunion: Released: June 29, 2004; Label: NH Media	Track listing: 1. UN story 2. Honeymoon; 3. 사랑할 걸 그랬나봐 It turns out you did love 4. 연인들의 바다 Sea lovers 5. Remember; 6. 알아요 I know 7. Romantic Boy/Comic Girl; 8. Love of my life 9. 늘always 10. Butti; 11. Paradise; 12. 아주 가끔 Very occasionally 13. Honeymoon (inst.)
5	Seventy Five Centimeter: Released: May 13, 2005; Label: NH Media	Track listing: 1. Intro; 2. 그녀에게 to her 3. 눈물아 제발 Tears Oh please 4. Late at night 5. 넌 친구? 난 연인! You're friends? I lover!; 6. No No No; 7. 사랑해요 당신이 날 생각하지 않는 시간에도 I love you even though you do not believe me hours 8. 희망사항 Wishful thinking 9. 별의 동화 Fairytale stars
Best	Good bye & Best: Released: January 26, 2006; Label: NH Media	Track listing: 1. 가지 말아요 Don't go 2. 사랑에 빠지다 Fall in love 3. 눈에 밟혀서 Balhyeoseo the eye 4. No! No! No! (Swing ver.); 5. 사랑해요 당신이 날 생각하지 않는 시간에도 (Unplugged Ver.) I also love the time you do not think of me (Unplugged Ver.); 6. 그녀에게 (Piano Ver.) To Her (Piano Ver.); 7. Remember (Piano Ver.); 8. Miss You (Unplugged Ver.); 9. Love Of My Life (Unplugged Ver.); 10. 40 Days; 11. 작별 (Unplugged Ver.) Goodbye (Unplugged Ver.); 12. 후(後)...오늘도 버릇처럼 그녀 생각을 하다 After (Rear) ... Today is her habit of thinking like 13. Felling (Unplugged Ver.); 14. 아침 (Unplugged Ver.) Breakfast (Unplugged Ver.)

=== Single ===
- 어쩌면 (2004-07-01)

=== DVD ===
- Special Album Music Video (2003-04-17)
- Sweet & Strong (2005-07-21)

== Awards ==
Year	Award-Giving Body	Category	Work	Result
2001	Mnet Asian Music Awards	Best Male Group	"Pado" (파도)	Nominated
2001	KMTV	Korean Music Awards gayodaesang		Won
2001	SBS	SBS Gayo Daejeon		Won
2001	SBS	August 26 Inkigayo	"wave" (파도)	Won
2001	SBS	November 11 Inkigayo	"Gift" (선물)	Won
2002	SBS Gayo Daejeon	Ballad Category		Won
2002	SBS	December 15 Inkigayo	"Miracle"	Won
2002	SBS	December 22 Inkigayo	"Miracle"	Won
2003	SBS Gayo Daejeon	Producer Award		Won
