= Lovers & Movies =

- Traditional Chinese: 愛我就陪我看電影
- Simplified Chinese: 爱我就陪我看电影
- Directed by: Niu Chaoyang
- Starring: Francis Ng; Yu Nan; Kim Bum; Guli Nazha; Simon Yam; Kara Hui
- Distributed by: Eastern April Day Film & Culture Zhejiang
- Release date: April 30, 2015
- Running time: 90 minutes
- Country: China
- Language: Mandarin
- Box office: CN¥3.11 million (China)

Lovers & Movies (Chinese: 爱我就陪我看电影) is a 2015 Chinese romantic comedy film directed by Niu Chaoyang. It was released on April 30, 2015.

== Cast ==
- Francis Ng as Yao Xingjie
- Yu Nan as Ruoyao
- Kim Bum as Lin Jun
- Guli Nazha as Jiameng
- Simon Yam as Qiu Guitang
- Kara Hui as Ruanhua
- Zhang Xueying as Siyu
- Wang Zongze as Qiu Shui
- Jiang Wu as Master Liu
- Niu Ben as Grandpa
- Lu Yuan as Grandma

== Reception ==
By May 4, the film had earned $1.13 million at the Chinese box office.
