= Conspiracy in the Court =

- Promotional poster
- Also known as: Seoul's Sad Song
- Genre: Historical
- Written by: Park Jin-woo
- Directed by: Kwak Jung-hwan
- Starring: Jin Yi-han; Kim Ha-eun; Lee Chun-hee; Ahn Nae-sang
- Composer: Choi In-hee
- Country of origin: South Korea
- No. of episodes: 8

Production
- Producer: KBS media
- Running time: Wednesdays and Thursdays at 21:55 (KST)

Original release
- Network: KBS2
- Release: July 9 – July 31, 2007

Conspiracy in the Court (Korean: 한성별곡; RR: Hanseongbyeolgok; lit. 'Seoul's Sad Song'), is a 2007 South Korean historical drama broadcast on KBS2. The mystery thriller revolves around a murder case set in Hanseong, the capital of Korea during the latter years of the Joseon period when the nation was experiencing a rapid influx of western influences. Featuring a band of newcomers in the leading roles, Conspiracy in the Court entails a story of four young visionary idealists and King Jeongjo, Joseon's popular 22nd monarch who fought for commoners' rights and bureaucratic reformation. Despite low ratings averaging 6.00% (5.1% lowest - 7.5% peak), it was lauded for its high standard of content and art direction.

== Plot ==
In the midst of investigating a serial murder case, detective Park Sang-kyu (Jin Yi-han) confiscates a clump of wild berries from a smuggler, suspecting that these colorless odorless berries are key to solving the mystery behind the murder. Meanwhile, leading merchant Yang Man-oh (Lee Chun-hee) expands his power and influence by accusing his rival Hong of illegal doings to the police bureau. Shortly after, the city of Hansung is terrorized once again when another corpse is found in the marketplace. Detective Park suspects that the perpetrator is using the berries to murder victims. But as he begins to unlock the puzzle, he discovers that there is more to the case than meets the eye.

The three main characters of this drama pose the question of what a "righteous life" is in the era of political and social turmoil of the late Joseon Dynasty, when progressive thinking and the Confucian social reform movement "Silhak" began penetrating into Joseon from the Qing Dynasty. It was also a period when the 400-year Joseon Dynasty was gradually losing ground, unable to respond to external and internal changes in the wake of the Japanese invasion of the 16th century and the Manchu War, resulting in clashes between the king, who dreamed of restoring his authority through powerful reforms aimed at improving the lives of the people at the grassroots level, and conservative political forces, which felt threatened by the self-justified royal authority.

== Characters ==
- Park Sang-kyu: Born to a nobleman and a servant, Sang-kyu has lived with his heart tightly closed given all the pain and discrimination he has gone through due to his ambiguous social status. The only joy in his dissipated life full of self-torment is Lee Na-young, a woman he falls in love with. He frequents her family's house, where he learns about Silhak, and eventually decides to go to study to China at Na-young's recommendation. But when he returns after four years, he learns that Na-young's family had been banished for conspiracy. He applies for a state exam hoping to take a high-ranking government post and find Na-young, but faces discrimination and ends up in despair and disappointment in Silhak.
- Lee Na-young: The only daughter of Lee Cham-pan, Na-young has high goals and strong ambitions. Well familiar with progressive thinking thanks to her father, she teaches her family's servants how to read and believes that society will change someday. She ends up falling in love with Sang-kyu as she tries to open his tightly closed heart. She turns down Yang Man-ho, a man of a high-ranking post and enormous wealth, and encourages Sang-kyu to go to study in China, hoping to become his wife and the mother of his children when he returns. But her life takes a tragic turn when her father becomes accused of conspiracy and her mother later dies after a life in exile. Just when she is unable to endure more pain and suffering, she meets Hwang Jip-sa, who offers her a chance to go to the capital and teaches her acupuncture and how to use herbs. Na-young transforms into a coldhearted killer to avenge her parents.
- Yang Man-oh: Not willing to cringe to the nobility, like his father did, Man-oh leaves Lee Cham-pan's house to rise to a higher post than noblemen. He joins the rebel group Saljugye to oust the nobility and pave the way for people like himself. Soon he becomes the leader of the group but it falls to pieces due to a massive suppression that forces Man-oh to return to Lee Cham-pan's house to ponder his next step. He learns about progressive thinking from Na-young, who welcomes him with a warm heart, unlike his father, and realizes that in order to gain power he doesn't need weapons, but money.

== Political relevance ==
As this politically charged drama began airing during the peak of Korea's 2007 presidential campaign, viewers compared the ideal leadership model of King Jeongjo to current affairs.

== Cast ==
- Jin Yi-han as Park Sang-kyu
- Kim Ha-eun as Lee Na-young
- Lee Chun-hee as Yang Man-oh
- Ahn Nae-sang as King Jeongjo
- Jung Ae-ri as the Queen Mother (Daebi)
- Do Ji-won as Wolhyang
- Kim Eung-soo as Park In-bin
- Han Jung-soo as Seo Joo-pil
- Park Sun-young as Lady Jo (sang-gung)
- Kim Gi-hyun as Shim Min-gu
- Nam Il-woo as Chae Seung-hwan
- Jang Hyun-sung as Lee Jae-han
- Kim Myung-soo as Butler Park
- Jeon Hyun as Minister of Personnel
- Park Su-hyun as Choi Il-woo
- Bae Sung-woo as Kang Do-sul
- Jo Sung-il as Do Sang-cheon
- Park Chul-min as the Commander of the Capital Police
- Lee Mi-ji as Lady Eom (gwi-in)
- Lee Seong as Lee Cham-pan, Na-young's father
- Kim Young-ae as Lady Han (sang-gung)
- Sa Hyun-jin as Lady Park (sang-gung)
- Kim Kyung-ryong as Han Doo-hee
- Jeon Il-beom as Shin Sung-doo
- Go In-beom as Kang Geuk-soo
- Kim Myung-gook as Hong Haeng-soo
- Park Pal-young as Hong Man-ki
- Lee Dae-ro as Noh Gaek-joo
- Jung Jin as Kang Jae-soon
- Jung Jin-gak as Choi Ui-won
- Kim Hee-ryung as Na-young's mother
