= Kim Bum =

South Korean actor and singer (born 1989)

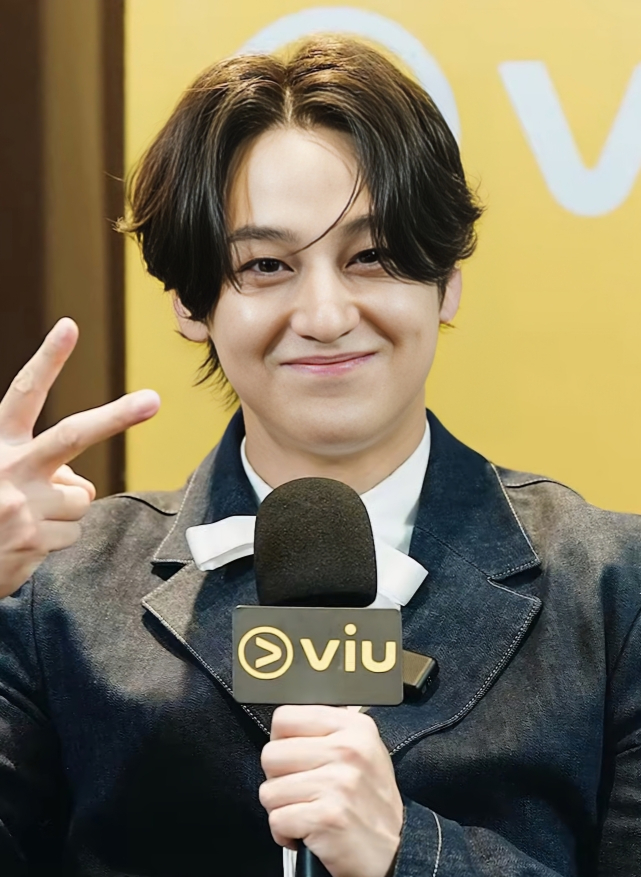
- Kim in 2023
- Born: Kim Sang-bum; July 7, 1989 (age 37); Mapo, Seoul, South Korea
- Education: Chung-Ang University
- Occupations: Actor; singer
- Years active: 2006–present
- Agent: King Kong by Starship

Korean name
- Hangul: 김상범
- Hanja: 金尚汎
- RR: Gim Sangbeom
- MR: Kim Sangbŏm

Stage name
- Hangul: 김범
- Hanja: 金汎
- RR: Gim Beom
- MR: Kim Pŏm
- Website: starship-ent.com

Signature
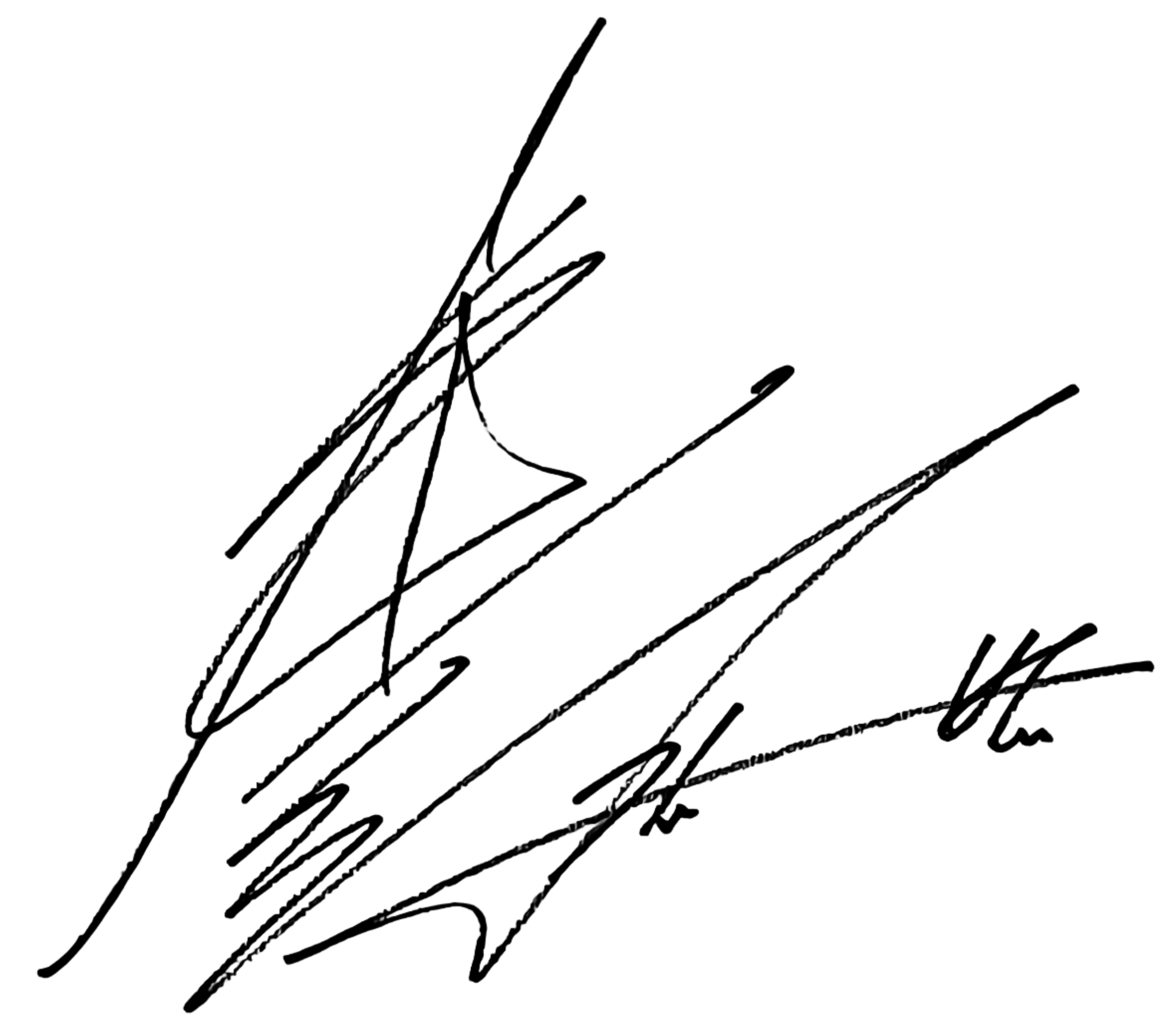

Kim Sang-bum (Korean: 김상범; born July 7, 1989), known professionally as Kim Bum (alternatively Kim Beom), is a South Korean actor and singer. He is best known for his television roles as F4 member So Yi-jung in Boys Over Flowers (2009), half-blood gumiho Lee Rang in Tale of the Nine Tailed (2020), and genius student Han Joon-hwi in Law School (2021). Kim reprised his role as Lee Rang in Tale of the Nine Tailed 1938 (2023).

== Early life and education ==
Kim Sang-beom was born in Seoul, South Korea on July 7, 1989. He attended Chung-ang University, majoring in Film and Theater.

== Career ==
=== 2006–2007: Beginnings ===
Kim joined the "Survival Star Audition", and was placed 6th out of hundreds of contestants. However, because he was under 20, he could not proceed in the competition. "Survival Star Audition" opened many opportunities for Kim, and he received multiple roles in television series. Kim made his acting debut in the sitcom High Kick!.

=== 2008–2011: Rising popularity ===
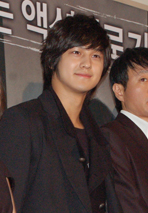
Kim in 2009

Kim first gained recognition for his scene-stealing role in MBC's anniversary drama East of Eden, winning the Netizen Popularity Award at the Korea Drama Awards. He rose to prominence in 2009 after playing the role of So Yi-jung in the hit drama Boys Over Flowers. He achieved further recognition with his supporting role in fantasy melodrama Padam Padam (2011), written by Noh Hee-kyung.

=== 2012–2015: Solo debut and overseas activities ===
Kim released his first studio album, Hometown, on June 20, 2012. He performed his first solo concert, Kim Beom Japan Live 2012, at the Stellar Ball in Tokyo's Shinagawa Prince Hotel.

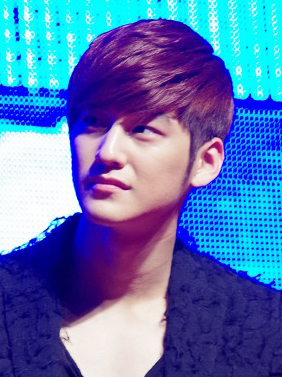
Kim in 2013

In 2013, Kim reunited with Noh in romance melodrama That Winter, the Wind Blows (2013). He made his Chinese film debut in Young Detective Dee: Rise of the Sea Dragon directed by Tsui Hark, which became one of the highest grossing Chinese films of the year. He then starred in the thriller Miracle Hands by Kwon Ho-young. The same year, he took on his first historical drama Goddess of Fire which co-stars Moon Geun-young.

In 2014, Kim was cast in his first Chinese television drama V Love, also known as the Chinese version of Gossip Girl. Kim subsequently starred in two Chinese films; romantic comedy Lovers & Movies and suspense film The Beloved.

=== 2015–present: Comeback to Korea ===
Kim made his small-screen comeback in tvN's crime thriller Hidden Identity in 2015. He starred in another crime thriller Mrs. Cop 2, and earned praise for his portrayal of a villain.

In 2018, Kim appeared in Detective K: Secret of the Living Dead, the third installment in the comedy-mystery Detective K film series, marking his return to Korean cinemas after four years.

In 2020, he starred in the fantasy drama Tale of the Nine Tailed alongside Lee Dong-wook and Jo Bo-ah.

In 2021, he starred in legal drama Law School.

In 2022, Kim starred in Ghost Doctor, acting alongside Rain. Later in July, Kim joined the UNIVERSE communication platform.

In 2023, Kim reprised his role of Lee Rang in Tale of the Nine Tailed 1938 alongside Lee Dong-wook.

== Personal life ==
=== Health ===
In February 2012, Kim's agency announced that he was suffering from degenerative arthritis due to the dramatic weight-loss he experienced after training for his role in the JTBC cable drama Padam Padam.

=== Military service ===
He enlisted in the military in April 2018 and was released in March 2020.

== Other ventures ==
=== Endorsements ===
In 2007, Kim appeared in advertisements for Crown's Big Pie with co-actors Kim Hye-seong and Park Min-young and for Ottogi's Ramen with actor Kim Kwang-kyu.

In 2008, he endorsed the KTF Show Show rate plan along with Shim Eun-kyung. In 2009, following his popularity from the drama Boys Over Flowers, he appeared in several commercials. These included ads for the clothing store Spris with Go Ara, for LG U^{+} Teen Ring with co-actors Lee Min-ho and Koo Hye-sun, for Samsung's Anycall with Kim So-eun, for Nintendo's Mario Kart Wii, for Dongseo food's Maxim Cafe with Seo Woo, for the T.I. for Men clothing brand, and for Hanbul Cosmetics' shop brand It's Skin. He was also appointed as the ambassador of Kia's Forte Koup.

In 2009, he appeared in a TV commercial in the Philippines for a beverage brand RC Cola alongside Filipino actress Maja Salvador.

In 2010, he endorsed the restaurant Demaris with actress Hwang Jung-eum, the clothing brand Edwin with Miss A, and Bon IF's Bonjuk restaurant with Kim So-eun.

=== Ambassadorships ===
Year	Organization/Event	Notes	Ref.
2009	Gyeonggi Province public relations ambassador		
2009	SK Environmental Campaign Green Village		
2010	12th Seoul International Youth Film Festival	with Son Eun-seo	
2010	12th University Economics Universiade Promotion Ambassador		
2010	Hallyu Dream Festival	with Yoon Sang-hyun	
2012	UNICEF Korea Committee Special Envoy	with Han Ga-in	

== Filmography ==
=== Film ===
Key
†	Denotes films that have not yet been released

Year	Title	Role	Notes	Ref.
2008	Hellcats	Lee Ho-jae		
2008	Death Bell	Kang Hyeon		
2009	Flight	Park Si-beom		
2013	Young Detective Dee: Rise of the Sea Dragon	Yuan Zhen		
2013	The Gifted Hands	Kim Joon		
2013	Hello Seoul	Kim Kyung-woo	Promotional web short film produced for MIOGGI Hong Kong	
2015	Lovers and Movies	Lin Jun		
2015	The Beloved	Jiang Suying		
2018	Detective K: Secret of the Living Dead	Cheon-moo		

=== Television series ===
Key
†	Denotes television productions that have not yet been released

Year	Title	Role	Notes	Ref.
2006	Rude Women	Jeong Hyeon-jun		
2006	High Kick!	Kim Bum		
2008	East of Eden	Lee Dong-cheol (15 years old)		
2009	Boys Over Flowers	So Yi-jung		
2009	Dream	Lee Jang-seok		
2009	High Kick Through the Roof	Ja-ok's nephew	Cameo (episode 72)	
2010	The Woman Who Still Wants to Marry	Ha Min-jae		
2010	Haru: An Unforgettable Day in Korea	Photographer	Produced by the Korea National Tourism Organization.	
2011	Padam Padam	Lee Gook-soo		
2012	High Kick: Revenge of the Short Legged		Cameo (episode 108)	
2013	That Winter, the Wind Blows	Park Jin-sung		
2013	Goddess of Fire	Kim Tae-do		
2014	V Love	Ou Hui	Chinese drama	
2015	Hidden Identity	Cha Gun-woo		
2016	Mrs. Cop 2	Lee Ro-joon		
2020	Tale of the Nine Tailed	Lee Rang		
2021	Law School	Han Joon-hwi		
2022	Ghost Doctor	Go Seung-Tak		
2023	Tale of the Nine Tailed 1938	Lee Rang		
2024	Wedding Impossible		Cameo (ep 11-12)	
2026	Sold Out on You	Seo Eric / Eric Desruets		

=== Musical ===
Musical play performances
Year	Title		Role	Theater	Date	Ref.
Year	English	Korean	Role	Theater	Date	Ref.
2024	A Gentleman's Guide to Love and Murder	젠틀맨스 가이드	Monty Navarro	Kwanglim Arts Center BBCH Hall	July 6 to October 20	

=== Music video appearances ===
Year	Song title	Artist	Ref.
2006	"Boom Up"	Boom	

== Discography ==
=== Albums ===
Title	Album details	Peak chart positions
Title	Album details	JPN
Christmas Eve's Sky (聖夜の空)	Released: December 16, 2009; Label: Glory Entertainment; Track listing: 1. イントロ（フォー・イブズ・ラバーズ） Intro (For Eve's Lovers); 2. 聖夜の空 (Christmas Eve's Sky); 3. 今、会いに行きます (I'm Going To Meet Her Now); 4. 今、会いに行きます（韓国語版） (I'm Going To Meet Her Now (Korean)); 5. 聖夜の空（インストゥルメンタル） (Christmas Eve's Sky (Inst.)); 6. 今、会いに行きます（インストゥルメンタル） (I'm Going To meet Her Now (Inst.))	109
Home Town	Released: June 20, 2012; Label: Pony Canyon; Track listing: 1. Day Break; 2. My Old Friend; 3. Home Town; 4. 雪月花 (The End of Silence / Serene Beauty); 5. 君のための歌 (Song for You); 6. 夢の後先 (Beyond Dreams / Consequences of a Dream ) 7. 太陽と月 (The Sun & The Moon)	39

=== Soundtrack appearances ===
Title	Year	Album
"Running To You Now"	2009	F4 Special Edition (Boys Over Flowers OST)
"The Woman Who Cut My Guitar Strings"	2010	The Woman Who Still Wants to Marry OST
"Confession"	2010	The Woman Who Still Wants to Marry OST

== Awards and nominations ==
Name of the award ceremony, year presented, category, nominee of the award, and the result of the nomination
Award ceremony	Year	Category	Nominee / Work	Result	Ref.
Andre Kim Best Star Awards	2009	Male Star Award	Kim Bum	Won	
Baeksang Arts Awards	2009	Best New Actor – Television	East of Eden	Nominated	
Baeksang Arts Awards	2013	Best New Actor – Film	The Gifted Hands	Nominated	
KBS Drama Awards	2009	Best New Actor	Boys Over Flowers	Nominated	
Korea Drama Awards	2008	Netizen Popularity Award	East of Eden	Won	
Korea Drama Awards	2022	Top Excellence Award, Actor	Ghost Doctor	Won	
Mnet 20's Choice Awards	2007	Best Couple Award	Kim Bum (with Kim Hye-sung); Unstoppable High Kick	Won	
Mnet 20's Choice Awards	2009	Hot Male Drama Star	Boys Over Flowers	Nominated	
SBS Drama Awards	2009	New Star Award	Dream	Won	
SBS Drama Awards	2013	Excellence Award, Actor in a Miniseries	That Winter, the Wind Blows	Nominated	
SBS Drama Awards	2016	Excellence Award, Actor in a Genre Drama	Mrs. Cop 2	Nominated	

=== Listicles ===
Name of publisher, year listed, name of listicle, and placement
Publisher	Year	Listicle	Placement	Ref.
Forbes	2010	Korea Power Celebrity 40	24th	
