= Han Go-eun =

South Korean actress (born 1975)

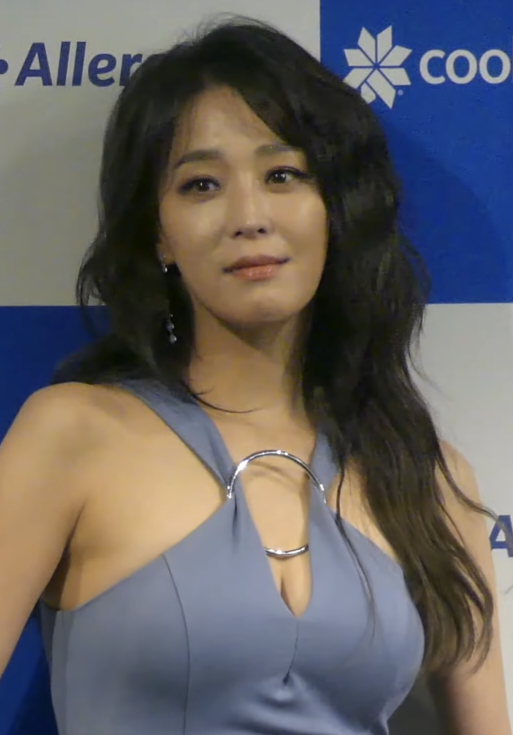
- Han in May 2019
- Born: March 10, 1975 (age 51); Seoul, South Korea
- Education: Fashion Institute of Design & Merchandising
- Occupation: Actress
- Years active: 1995–present
- Agent: Mada Entertainment
- Spouse: Shin Yeong-soo (m. 2015)

Korean name
- Hangul: 한고은
- Hanja: 韓高恩
- RR: Han Goeun
- MR: Han Koŭn

Han Go-eun (Korean: 한고은; born March 10, 1975) is a South Korean actress.

== Career ==
Han Go-eun entered the Korea Super Elite Model Contest in 1995, and after several years of modeling, she began acting full-time in 1998. That year, she made her acting debut in the film City of the Rising Sun, but stayed in television in subsequent years.

Despite the popularity of her television dramas such as Bodyguard (2003), Han was criticized early in her career for poor acting, particularly for her voice articulation and pronunciation.

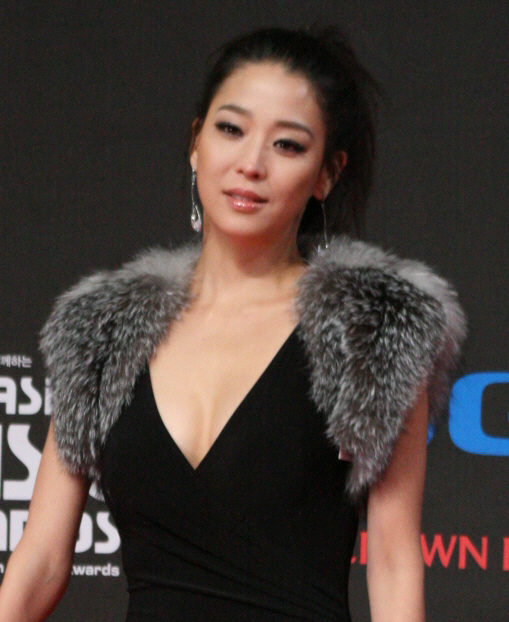
Han in 2009

But she later earned praise for her roles in More Beautiful Than a Flower, Love and Ambition (2006), Capital Scandal (2007), and The Reputable Family (2010).

In 2011, she starred in Daughters of Bilitis Club, part of the single-episode anthology Drama Special. Named after the American lesbian rights group, it was public broadcaster KBS's first lesbian-themed drama and was a frank portrayal of three same-sex couples across multiple generations. But it was later pulled off the air due to public pressure.

Afterwards, Han played antagonists in Me Too, Flower! (2011), and Goddess of Fire (2013).

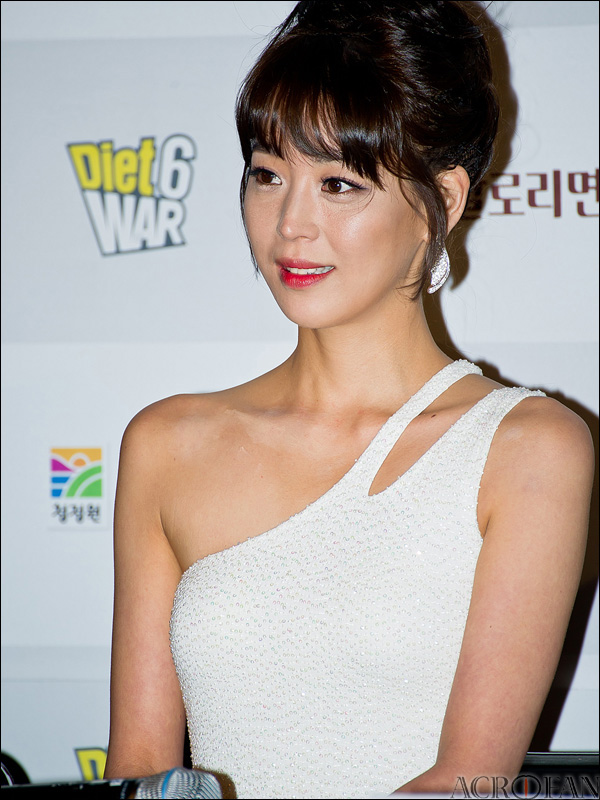
Han in 2012

She also hosted Diet Master, a weekly program on cable that invites guests who have struggled to lose weight and provides help from health experts.

In 2018, she starred in Same Bed, Different Dreams 2: You Are My Destiny, a reality show that received favourable feedback and became well known in some countries.

In 2019, she starred in Miss Korea/I Miss Korea, a cook-stay variety program that featured her traveling to homes around the world and sharing her cooking skills.

== Personal life ==
She lived in the US from middle school until college, which allowed her to learn English.

Her older sister, Han Seong-won, won Miss Korea 1995 Second Runner-up.

From 2001 to 2003, Han had a highly publicized relationship with Park Joon-hyung, singer and member of the boy band g.o.d.

She married a corporate employee, Shin Yeong-soo, on August 30, 2015.

== Filmography ==
=== Television series ===
- Family Register (MBC TV, 2026)
- Never Give Up (Netflix, 2022)
- Undercover (JTBC, 2021)
- Love Alert (MBN, 2018)
- Should We Kiss First? (SBS, 2018)
- Miss Mamma Mia (KBS, 2015)
- A Little Love Never Hurts (MBC, 2013)
- Goddess of Fire (MBC, 2013)
- Suspicious Family (MBN, 2012)
- Me Too, Flower! (MBC, 2011)
- KBS Drama Special "Daughters of Bilitis Club" (KBS2, 2011)
- The Slave Hunters 2010
- A Man Called God (MBC, 2010)
- The Reputable Family (KBS1, 2010)
- Can Anyone Love (SBS, 2009)
- Formidable Rivals (KBS2, 2008) (cameo, ep 16)
- Woman of Matchless Beauty, Park Jung-geum (MBC, 2008)
- Capital Scandal (KBS2, 2007)
- Love and Ambition (SBS, 2006)
- Lawyers (MBC, 2005)
- Spring Day (SBS, 2005)
- Jang Gil-san (SBS, 2004)
- More Beautiful Than a Flower (KBS2, 2004)
- Bodyguard (KBS2, 2003)
- That Woman Catches People (SBS, 2002)
- Like Father Unlike Son (KBS, 2001)
- Medical Center (SBS, 2000)
- Money.com (SBS, 2000)
- Love Story – "Lost Baggage" (SBS, 1999)
- Sweet Bride (SBS, 1999)
- Happy Together (SBS, 1999)
- LA Arirang (SBS, 1995)

=== Film ===
- The Black Hand (2015)
- City of Damnation (2009)
- City of the Rising Sun (1998)

=== Variety shows ===
- Legendary Actors (KBS2, 2021, Chuseok special program)
- Miss Korea (2019)
- Same Bed, Different Dreams 2: You Are My Destiny (2018)
- Diet Master (StoryOn, 2013)
- Law of the Jungle W (SBS, 2012)
- Diet Wars 6 (StoryOn, 2012)
- Entertainment Weekly (KBS2, 2001)
- Section TV (MBC, 1999)

=== Music video appearances ===
- Beige – "I Can't Drink" (2011)
- Park Hye-kyung – "New Boyfriend" (2010)
- Cho Eun – "Sad Love Song" (2004)
- MC the Max – "Poem of Love" (2003)
- Lee Soo-young – "Never Again" (2001)

== Awards ==
- 2007 KBS Drama Awards: Best Supporting Actress (Capital Scandal)
- 2003 KBS Drama Awards: Popularity Award (Bodyguard)
- 2002 SBS Drama Awards: Popularity Award (That Woman Catches People)
- 2001 KBS Drama Awards: Popularity Award, Photogenic Award (Like Father Unlike Son)
