= I Picked Up a Celebrity on the Street =

2018 South Korean television series

- Also known as: I Picked Up a Celebrity on the Road; I Picked Up a Star on the Road
- Hangul: 나는 길에서 연예인을 주웠다
- RR: Naneun gireseo yeonyeineul juwotda
- MR: Nanŭn kiresŏ yŏnyeinŭl chuwŏtta
- Genre: Romantic comedy
- Created by: YG Studioplex
- Written by: Lee Nam Gyu, Moon Jong Ho, Oh Bo Hyun
- Directed by: Kwon Hyuk Chan
- Starring: Sung Hoon; Kim Ga-eun
- Composer: Park Se-jun
- Country of origin: South Korea
- Original language: Korean
- No. of episodes: 10

Production
- Camera setup: Single camera
- Running time: 1 hour 5 minutes
- Production company: YG Studioplex

Original release
- Network: Oksusu
- Release: November 1 – November 30, 2018

I Picked Up a Celebrity on the Street (Korean: 나는 길에서 연예인을 주웠다; RR: Naneun gireseo yeonyeineul juwotda) is a 2018 South Korean television series produced by YG Studioplex starring Sung Hoon, Kim Ga-eun and Kim Jong-hoon. It aired on the Oksusu mobile platform from November 1 to 30, 2018 and is available internationally on Viki.

== Synopsis ==
Lee Yeon-seo (Kim Ga-eun) is a contract worker for a corporation called Bonjour. Her section chief, Mr. Nam, mistreats her, blaming her for his own mistakes (including the refusal of major K-pop celebrity Kang Joon-hyeok (Sung Hoon) to sign an endorsement deal), pawing at her, and neglecting the paperwork she needs to get paid. Yeon-seo loses her temper at a company drink party and in an alleyway outside the bar assaults a person from behind whom she mistakes for Nam and knocks him out cold. She realizes that in fact she has struck Joon-hyeok. Believing she has killed him, she manages to drag him to her apartment (with the help of some clueless police officers who think he is just her drunk boyfriend). She tries to think up ways to dispose of the body, only to discover that Joon-hyeok is alive. She decides to tie him up and keep him captive, fearing he will hand her over to the authorities. She employs her wrestling skills to keep control over Joon-hyeok and she also persuades her unemployed (and somewhat credulous) neighbor Hwang Nam-goo (Kim Jong-hoon) to help her, pretending that Joon-hyeok is her schizophrenic cousin who has delusions that he is the real Joon-hyeok because, naturally, he looks just like him.

While Joon-hyeok's manager, his rival Mir, and his girlfriend and would-be fiancée Se-ra (Park Soo-ah) wonder where he has gone and a nosy police officer and a reporter look for him, Yeon-so and Joon-hyeok settle into an uncomfortable relationship, marked mostly by moments of mistrust and occasional (and not very long-lasting) moments of rapprochement, as well as numerous comic near-misses when Yeon-seo is nearly caught. They make a deal that she will release him after three months, during which she tries various part-time jobs and then a humiliating return as a temporary worker at Bonjour, all to make enough money to be able to escape Korea. But she finds it impossible to save due to her having to pay rent, student loans and the luxury food that Joon-hyeok demands. (She doesn't ask for a ransom.) Gradually, although Joon-hyeok keeps trying to escape, the two get closer, while plots swirl around Joon-hyeok in his absence.

== Cast ==
=== Main ===
- Sung Hoon as Kang Joon-hyeok
- Kim Ga-eun as Lee Yeon-seo
  - Lee Do-yeon as child Yeon-seo
- Kim Jong-hoon as Hwang Nam-goo

=== Supporting ===
- Kang Sung-jin as CEO Kim, head of Joon-hyeok's agency
- Park Soo-ah as Jin Se-ra (Joon-hyeok's girlfriend)
- Han Eun-sun as Moon-hee (Yeon-seo's best friend)
- Ji Ho-sung as Mir (Joon-hyeok's rival)
- Yoon Kyung-ho, as Detective Byun Ji-yong
- Heo Jun-seok, Section Chief Nam, Bonjour Marketing Team
- Jung Mi-mi as Na Ji-eun, Bonjour Marketing Team
- Hwang Jung-min as Yeon-seo's mother

=== Guest Roles ===
- Park Seul-ki, Accounting department employee (Ep. 1)
- Seo Beom-seok, Bonjour CEO (Ep. 1)
- Lee Soo-ji, Radio talk show host (Ep. 1)
- Lee Seung-chul, Drunkard in the alley (Ep. 1)
- Son Young-sun, Sang-min's grandmother (Ep.3)
- Choi Dae-sung, Driving instructor (Ep. 4)
- Moon Se-yun, Wrestling coach (Ep.4)
- Ahn Young-mi, Joon-hyeok's fan (Ep. 4)
- Kim Jin-ok, Neighbor gossiping about Nak-goo (Ep. 4)
- Jeong Hee-tae, Reporter Seo (Eps. 6-7, 9)
- Seo Jung-yeon, Joon-hyeok's mother (Ep. 7)
- Jang Tae-min, Bonjour commercial PD (Eps. 7, 8)
- Yoo Byung-jae, PD Won (SKB Broadcasting) (Ep. 8)
- Jin Hyun-kwang, Reporter (Ep. 9)
- Lee Joo-shil, Yoon-seo's grandmother (Ep. 10)
- Yoon Joo-man, Gangster (Ep. 10)

== Sung Hoon claim for unpaid wages ==
It was reported that in January 2019, according to a source at Sung Hoon's agency Stallion Entertainment, "Sung Hoon has not been properly paid for starring in I Picked Up a Celebrity on the Street." The agency added, "The amount is 105 million won (approximately $93,600). We are currently planning to take legal action.",
