= Miss Mamma Mia =

- Promotional poster
- Genre: Melodrama; Romance
- Written by: Park Sung-jin; Sung Joo-hyun
- Directed by: Kim Jong-chang
- Starring: Kang Byul; Han Go-eun; Shim Hyung-tak; Seo Do-young
- Country of origin: South Korea
- Original language: Korean
- No. of episodes: 12

Production
- Executive producer: Oh Sung-min
- Production location: South Korea
- Running time: 60 minutes Wednesdays to Thursdays at 23:00 (KST)
- Production company: GnG Production

Original release
- Network: KBS Drama
- Release: January 28 – March 12, 2015

Miss Mamma Mia (Korean: Miss 맘마미아) is a 2015 South Korean television series starring Kang Byul, Han Go-eun, Shim Hyung-tak and Seo Do-young. It aired on KBS Drama on Wednesdays to Thursdays at 23:00 for 12 episodes beginning January 28, 2015.

== Plot ==
Seo Young-joo was abandoned by her parents as a child and betrayed by the man she loved. Despite all that, she stays positive as she raises her five-year-old daughter on her own while working part-time jobs.

== Cast ==
- Kang Byul as Seo Young-joo
- Han Go-eun as Oh Joo-ri
- Shim Hyung-tak as Na Woo-jin/Kevin Edwards
- Seo Do-young as Yoo Myung-han
- Jang Young-nam as Lee Mi-ryun
- Kim Ha-eun as Kang Bong-sook
- Jang Eun-poong as Joo Ki-chan
- Ahn Seung-hoon as President Ahn
- Park Soo-young as Shim Seok-bong
- Shin Yi as Seo Ha-roo's biological mother
- Gil Hae-yeon as Ma Hae-yeon
- Kim Ha-yoo as Seo Ha-ru
- Bae Kang-yoo as Lee Jong-min
