= Level Up (South Korean TV series) =

2019 South Korean television series

- Promotional poster
- Hangul: 레벨업
- RR: Rebereop
- MR: Reberŏp
- Genre: Romantic comedy
- Written by: Kim Dong-gyu
- Directed by: Kim Sang-woo
- Starring: Sung Hoon; Han Bo-reum; Cha Sun-woo; Kang Byul; Danny Ahn
- Country of origin: South Korea
- Original language: Korean
- No. of episodes: 12

Production
- Producers: Jung Hoon-tak; Kim Sang-young; Kang Min-gyu
- Camera setup: Single-camera
- Running time: 60 minutes
- Production companies: iHQ; ANEW

Original release
- Network: MBN; Dramax
- Release: July 10 – August 15, 2019

Level Up (Korean: 레벨업) is a 2019 South Korean television series starring Sung Hoon, Han Bo-reum, Cha Sun-woo, Kang Byul and Danny Ahn. Produced by iHQ and ANEW Productions, it aired from July 10 to August 15, 2019 on Wednesdays and Thursdays at 23:00 (KST) of MBN and Dramax.

== Synopsis ==
An Dan-Te is a director at Yoosung CRC, which specializes in restructuring companies. He does not express his feelings and he is a perfectionist at work. He seems cold-blooded. To save the game company Joybuster from bankruptcy, An Dan-Te is sent there and begins to work as their new CEO.

Meanwhile, Shin Yeon-Hwa is head of game development at Joybuster. She works on a new game, which can satisfy CEO An Dan-Te, but they come into conflict on pretty much everything.

== Cast ==
=== Main ===
- Sung Hoon as Ahn Dan-te

Head of headquarters for Yuseong CRC. The ace of Yuseong CRC, a company that specializes in structural reorganization. Any floundering company will be transformed into a thriving business under his magic hands. His impeccable manner of handling work comes with a hot personality and cold-hearted ruthlessness. Although he tried not to work with game companies due to bad childhood memories involving games, he starts to break the rules he imposed on himself one by one while working with Yeon Hwa.

- Han Bo-reum as Shin Yeon-hwa

Leader of Joybuster Development. After working at Joybuster for 3 years, she suddenly became the head of the design division after a series of voluntary resignations. She mistook Dan Te as one of the company shareholders and was shocked to discover that he would be Joybuster's new CEO. She's passionate and good at designing games, but she was unable to let her ideas come to fruition because of her lack of experience.

- Cha Sun-woo as Kwak Han-cheol

New employee at Yuseong CRC. A nice guy who pursues happiness over success. He gave up on going to college due to a family situation. After helping his father for a few years, he jumped into the job market later than his peers. By a strike of fate in his mundane life, he met Dan Te & Yeon Hwa. He considered Dan Te as a life coach, and Yeon Hwa as his soul mate.

- Kang Byul as Bae Ya-che

CEO of Arena Entertainment. She's the CEO of one of the companies Dan Te saved and has an unrequited love for him, and insists on having some kind of relationship, even though Dante makes it clear he has no interest. She becomes jealous of Yeon Hwa as she thinks they are competing for Dan Te's affections.

- Danny Ahn as Park Gi-woo

General Manager of Yuseong CRC. Dan Te's right-hand man. He is the only son of Yuseong's CEO. Gil Woo is aware that he's nowhere near as skilled as Dan Te. He trusts and follows Dan Te and is satisfied as the General Manager. He's a simple guy who prefers happiness over success with YOLO as his life motto.

=== Supporting ===
- Shin Jung-yoon as Song Joo-im
- Ryu Seung-soo as Jo Tae-goo
- Lee Byung-joon as Shin Yeon-hwa
- Jung Soo-kyo as Kang Seong-goo
- Son Sang-yeon as Kang Hoon
- Lee Ga-won as Oh Mi-ja
- Son Jin-hwan as Dan-te's father
- Kim Ji-in as Sang-mi

== Original soundtrack ==
Released on July 17, 2019
No.	Title	Artist	Length
1.	"Walk Alone" (걸어가네)	Jeje	3:44
2.	"Limpid Snow" (지금처럼)	Jeon Keonho	4:22
3.	"Love Song" (더 조금만 더)	Kim Areum	3:53
4.	"Walk Alone" (Inst.)		3:42

== Ratings ==
In this table, the blue numbers represent the lowest ratings and the red numbers represent the highest ratings.

Ep.	Broadcast date	
Ep.	Broadcast date	AGB Nielsen (Nationwide)
1	July 10, 2019	1.346%
2	July 11, 2019	0.789%
3	July 17, 2019	1.388%
4	July 18, 2019	0.856%
5	July 24, 2019	1.090%
6	July 25, 2019	0.716%
7	July 31, 2019	0.913%
8	August 1, 2019	0.717%
9	August 7, 2019	0.996%
10	August 8, 2019	0.698%
11	August 14, 2019	0.773%
12	August 15, 2019	0.534%
Average		0.901%

- This drama aired on a cable channel/pay TV which normally has a relatively smaller audience compared to free-to-air TV/public broadcasters (KBS, SBS, MBC and EBS).
