= Nice Witch =

2018 South Korean television series

- Promotional poster
- Hangul: 착한마녀전
- Hanja: 착한魔女傳
- Lit.: Good Witch
- RR: Chakhan manyeojeon
- MR: Ch'akhan manyŏjŏn
- Genre: Family; Melodrama
- Written by: Yoon Young-Mi
- Directed by: Oh Se-Gang
- Starring: Lee Da-hae; Ryu Soo-young; Ahn Woo-yeon; Bae Soo-bin; Yoon Se-ah
- Country of origin: South Korea
- Original language: Korean
- No. of episodes: 40 (Note: In order to circumvent Korean laws that prevent commercial breaks in the middle of an episode, what would previously have been aired as single 70 minute episodes are now being repackaged as two 35 minute episodes, with two episodes being shown each night with a commercial break between the two.)

Production
- Executive producer: Lee Young-hoon
- Running time: 35 minutes
- Production company: Hunus Entertainment

Original release
- Network: SBS TV
- Release: March 3 – May 5, 2018

Nice Witch (Korean: 착한마녀전) is a 2018 South Korean television series starring Lee Da-hae, Ryu Soo-young, Ahn Woo-yeon, Bae Soo-bin and Yoon Se-ah. The series airs four consecutive episodes on Saturday on SBS TV from 8:55 p.m. to 11:15 p.m. (KST) from March 3 to May 5, 2018.

== Cast ==
=== Main ===
- Lee Da-hae as Cha Sun-hee / Cha Do-hee
- Ryu Soo-young as Song Woo-jin
- Ahn Woo-yeon as Oh Tae-yang

=== Supporting ===
==== People in Share House ====
- Shin Hye-jeong as Joo Ye-bin

==== Sun-hee's family ====
- Bae Soo-bin as Bong Chun-dae
- Ahn Sol-bin as Bong Chun-ji
- Geum Bo-ra as Byun Ok-jung
- Yang Geum-seok as Lee Moon-sook
- Lee Han-seo as Bong Cho-rong

==== Woo-jin's family ====
- Kim Yong-gun as Song Tae-joon
- Moon Hee-kyung as Kim Gong-joo

==== People in Royal Family Flight ====
- Yoon Se-ah as Oh Tae-ri
- Shim Hyung-tak as Chae Kang-min
- Lee Deok-hwa as Oh Pyung-pan

==== Extended ====
- Choi Joon-yong as Gong Hyun-joon
- Yoo Seo-jin as Min Soo-hyun
- Kim Ha-kyun as Park Ki-bum
- Lee Chul-min as Cha Jong-chul
- Ha Jae-sook as Heo Min-ji
- Kim Ji-eun as Wang Ji-yeong

== Ratings ==
- In this table, The blue numbers represent the lowest ratings and the red numbers represent the highest ratings.
- NR denotes that the drama did not rank in the top 20 daily programs on that date.

Episode #	Original broadcast date	Average audience share			
Episode #	Original broadcast date	TNmS Ratings		AGB Nielsen	
Episode #	Original broadcast date	Nationwide	Seoul National Capital Area	Nationwide	Seoul National Capital Area
1	March 3, 2018	7.6% (16th)	8.8%	9.2% (10th)	10.4% (7th)
2	March 3, 2018	9.5% (9th)	10.0%	10.8% (5th)	11.3%(4th)
3	March 3, 2018	9.9% (8th)	10.5%	11.0% (4th)	11.6% (3rd)
4	March 3, 2018	11.1% (6th)	12.0%	11.7% (3rd)	12.6% (2nd)
5	March 10, 2018	7.0% (18th)	7.3%	7.4% (15th)	7.7% (13th)
6	March 10, 2018	7.7% (14th)	7.8%	8.3% (10th)	8.4% (8th)
7	March 10, 2018	7.1% (16th)	7.4%	8.0% (11th)	8.3% (11th)
8	March 10, 2018	8.2% (12th)	8.5%	8.6% (9th)	9.0% (7th)
9	March 17, 2018	5.9% (19th)	6.6%	6.0% (18th)	6.7% (13th)
10	March 17, 2018	7.4% (11th)	7.9%	7.7% (9th)	7.7% (11th)
11	March 17, 2018	7.1% (15th)	7.3%	7.4% (11th)	8.2% (8th)
12	March 17, 2018	7.2% (14th)	7.8%	8.3% (8th)	8.9% (7th)
13	March 24, 2018	5.0% (NR)	6.3%	5.9% (NR)	7.2% (15th)
14	March 24, 2018	6.6% (17th)	7.2%	7.0% (12th)	7.6% (12th)
15	March 24, 2018	6.8% (13th)	8.0%	6.9% (14th)	8.1% (9th)
16	March 24, 2018	6.8% (13th)	7.5%	7.8% (9th)	8.6% (7th)
17	March 31, 2018	4.5% (NR)	4.7%	5.0% (NR)	5.2% (NR)
18	March 31, 2018	6.0% (NR)	7.1%	6.6% (16th)	7.6% (11th)
19	March 31, 2018	6.1% (19th)	6.8%	6.2% (19th)	6.9% (12th)
20	March 31, 2018	6.7% (14th)	7.3%	8.0% (8th)	8.6% (5th)
21	April 7, 2018	6.9% (19th)	7.4%	6.3% (NR)	6.8% (17th)
22	April 7, 2018	8.4% (10th)	8.7%	7.8% (12th)	8.1% (10th)
23	April 7, 2018	8.0% (12th)	8.2%	8.3% (8th)	8.6% (7th)
24	April 7, 2018	8.1% (11th)	8.5%	8.8% (5th)	9.4% (6th)
25	April 14, 2018	6.6% (NR)	6.7%	5.9% (NR)	6.0% (NR)
26	April 14, 2018	7.3% (15th)	7.4%	6.9% (16th)	6.9% (13th)
27	April 14, 2018	7.0% (18th)	7.2%	7.0% (14th)	7.1% (12th)
28	April 14, 2018	7.3% (15th)	7.9%	8.2% (7th)	8.8% (6th)
29	April 21, 2018	5.6% (NR)	6.1%	5.7% (NR)	6.2% (18th)
30	April 21, 2018	7.1% (11th)	7.8%	7.1% (13th)	7.7% (11th)
31	April 21, 2018	6.7% (13th)	7.9%	7.1% (13th)	7.4% (12th)
32	April 21, 2018	8.0% (9th)	8.8%	8.1% (11th)	8.7% (8th)
33	April 28, 2018	6.3% (NR)	6.7%	6.8% (15th)	7.2% (11th)
34	April 28, 2018	7.9% (12th)	8.1%	7.9% (9th)	8.0% (9th)
35	April 28, 2018	7.8% (13th)	8.3%	8.5% (8th)	9.0% (7th)
36	April 28, 2018	8.5% (8th)	9.4%	10.1% (5th)	10.9% (5th)
37	May 5, 2018	5.8% (NR)	6.2%	5.7% (19th)	6.1% (17th)
38	May 5, 2018	7.8% (13th)	7.4%	7.2% (12th)	7.1% (12th)
39	May 5, 2018	7.3% (15th)	7.5%	7.4% (10th)	7.4% (8th)
40	May 5, 2018	8.7% (10th)	8.8%	8.9% (6th)	
Average		7.3%	%	7.7%	8.2%

== Awards and nominations ==
Year	Award	Category	Recipient	Result	Ref.
2018	11th Korea Drama Awards	Excellence Award, Actor	Ryu Soo-young	Nominated	
2018	SBS Drama Awards	Top Excellence Award, Actor in a Daily and Weekend Drama	Ryu Soo-young	Nominated	
2018	SBS Drama Awards	Excellence Award, Actor in a Daily and Weekend Drama	Bae Soo-bin	Nominated	
2018	SBS Drama Awards	Excellence Award, Actress in a Daily and Weekend Drama	Yoon Se-ah	Nominated	
2018	SBS Drama Awards	Best New Actor	Ahn Woo-yeon	Nominated	
2018	SBS Drama Awards	Best New Actress	Shin Hye-jeong	Nominated	
2018	SBS Drama Awards	Best Young Actress	Lee Han-seo	Nominated	
