= Family Register =

2026 South Korean television series

- Promotional poster
- Hangul: 가족관계증명서
- Lit.: Family Relationship Certificate
- RR: Gajok gwangye jeungmyeongseo
- MR: Kajok kwan'gye chŭngmyŏngsŏ
- Genre: Melodrama; Family; Revenge
- Written by: Park Ji-hyun
- Directed by: Kim Mi-sook
- Starring: Park Se-young; Han Go-eun; Im Ji-eun; Sung I-eon; Park Sol-la; Yoon Hee-seok
- Country of origin: South Korea
- Original language: Korean
- No. of episodes: 85

Production
- Executive producers: Lee Hyung-sun; Seo Ho-jin
- Production companies: MBC C&I; Void

Original release
- Network: MBC TV
- Release: July 6, 2026 – present

Family Register (Korean: 가족관계증명서) is an ongoing South Korean melodrama family television series written by Park Ji-hyun, directed by Kim Mi-sook, and starring Park Se-young, Han Go-eun, Im Ji-eun, Sung I-eon, Park Sol-la, and Yoon Hee-seok. The series depicts the story of a woman who, from birth, is branded as the destroyer of her family, and who fights against prejudice and fate to reclaim her life. It premiered on MBC TV on July 6, 2026, and airs every Monday to Wednesday and Friday at 19:05 (KST), and every Thursday at 19:10 (KST).

== Synopsis ==
The series follows Na Ji-ni, Na Se-ri, and Noh Young-joo as they navigate family conflict, public judgment, and personal struggles while redefining their relationships and the true meaning of family.

== Cast and characters ==
=== Main ===
- Park Se-young as Na Ji-ni

Although she grew up in a privileged household as the daughter of a famous cellist and a director, she harbors deep emotional wounds that she has not easily confided in others. Her status as an illegitimate child led to bullying and falsehoods in her youth. Do-hee, whom she had considered a friend, exposed the secret and led a bullying spree, significantly impacting Ji-ni's life. She studied Korean painting at Hankuk University, focusing on creating K-animation with international appeal.

- Han Go-eun as Na Se-ri

Ji-ni's mother. A cellist who once dominated Korea's classical music scene, she is driven by ambition and prioritizes her own interests above all else. Despite achieving career success through her appearance and talent, she was stigmatized as an "adulteress". She had an affair with Cha Min-ki, a married man, and gave birth to Ji-ni. In a tearful interview, she framed the relationship as a "romance of the century" and depicted Young-ju, who refused divorce, as a malicious wife. This allowed her to recast herself from perpetrator to victim in public perception and maintain her position at the National Symphony Orchestra. Following the press conference, Se-ri and Min-ki were believed by the public to have become a legally married couple.

- Im Ji-eun as Noh Young-joo

A vocal music major, she aspired to become a musical actress and developed her skills in singing and acting. Following a relationship with her university peer Cha Min-ki, she became pregnant. She discontinued her career aspirations to raise their two sons, Seung-hyun and Seung-woo, with Min-ki. Her family life ended when Min-ki began living with cellist Na Se-ri.

- Sung I-eon as Lim Ji-hoo

Director of the Korea Art & Culture Center. As a child, he received little attention at home. His father was often absent for months at a time due to work at sea, and his mother provided little care. He began playing piano during a period of isolation, and it became his primary focus.

- Park Sol-la as Do Do-hee

A painter and influencer with numerous followers. She was raised by wealthy parents and has depended on their resources. She perceives that others envy her, though she has not achieved independent accomplishments. Her primary focus is maintaining a glamorous presence on social media. Since private elementary school, Do-hee ranked second to Ji-ni in academic standings. Despite efforts to meet her mother's expectation of ranking first, she did not achieve first place. Her mother's emphasis on being number one affected Do-hee. After experiencing physical punishment, Do-hee directed her frustration toward Ji-ni. As a result, she revealed Ji-ni's secret.

- Yoon Hee-seok as Lim Sa-bin

Ji-hoo's uncle and a traditional Korean medicine doctor. He operates a clinic in the same building as Young-ju's singing class. Although he lacks musical ability, he attends her class more consistently than other students. After meeting Young-ju, he experiences romantic feelings.

=== Supporting ===
Young-joo's family

- Jeon No-min as Cha Min-ki

CEO of the production company "Cha Production" and father of Ji-ni, Seung-hyun and Seung-woo.

- Seo Do-young as Cha Seung-hyun

Young-joo and Min-ki's eldest son who works as a Grade 7 postal service civil servant.

- Jeong Seung-bin as Cha Seung-woo

Young-joo and Min-ki's second son and a documentary PD at a broadcasting station.

- Jung So-young as Dang Ngoc Mai

Youngest daughter of the chairman of a Vietnamese quasi-chaebol family, who later became Seung-hyun's wife.

- Jang Yi-jun as Cha Oh-reum

Seung-hyun and Mai's son.

- Kim Dong-jun as Noh Il-dong

Young-joo's younger brother and Jung-bin's secretary and personal attendant.

- Gong Sang-ah as Oh Soo-yeon

Il-dong's wife and Ji-hoo's butler.

Lim family

- Um Hyo-sup as Lim Jung-bin

Ji-hoo's father, who is a two-star rear admiral in the ROK Navy.

- Choi Su-rin as Kim Sun-kyung

Jung-bin's wife and Ji-hoo's mother.

Others

- Yoon Ji-won as Jeon Jung-ah

Ji-ni's college classmate and best friend.

- Park Young-woon as Geum Tae-oh

Ji-hoo's best friend and owner of the cafe on the first floor of the building where Ji-ni and Jung-ah's art studio is located.

- Cho Seung-hee as Han Jung-won

A writer for a broadcasting station.

== Production ==
=== Development ===
The series is directed by Kim Mi-sook, who helmed The Brave Yong Su-jeong (2024), and written by Park Ji-hyun, who wrote You Are the Boss! (2013) and Person Who Gives Happiness (2016–2017). It is jointly produced by MBC C&I and Void, the production company behind the 2024 film Hidden Face.

=== Casting ===
In April 2026, Han Go-eun and Park Se-young were reportedly cast to lead the series as mother-daughter. The following month, the appearances of both actress were officially confirmed, and Im Ji-eun, Sung I-eon, Park Sol-la, Seo Do-young, and Jeon Seung-bin joined the cast.

== Release ==
The series is scheduled to premiere on MBC TV on July 6, 2026. It will air every Monday to Wednesday and Friday at 19:05 (KST), and every Thursday at 19:10 (KST).

== Viewership ==
Family Register : South Korea viewers per episode (thousands)

Episodes	Episode number																								
Episodes	1	2	3	4	5	6	7	8	9	10	11	12	13	14	15	16	17	18	19	20	21	22	23	24	25
1–25	831	706	815	820	765	821	863	795	819	865	776	805	790	888	848	820	890	774	848	908	909	885	825	825	908
26–50	814	825	792	883	934	994	903	927	900	994	953	816	824	943	963	991	963	890	911	885	916	927	884	890	888
51–75	974	875	952	908	923	839	912	831	909	965	1013	1009	911	946	842	939	888	999	879	997	918	1058	916	904	918
76–100	974	989	957	1061	915	1071	956	1015	917	879	TBD	TBD	TBD	TBD	TBD	TBD	TBD	TBD	TBD	TBD	TBD	TBD	TBD	TBD	TBD
101–120	TBD	TBD	TBD	TBD	TBD	TBD	TBD	TBD	TBD	TBD	TBD	TBD	TBD	TBD	TBD	TBD	TBD	TBD	TBD	TBD	–				

Source: Audience measurement performed nationwide by Nielsen Korea.

Average TV viewership ratings
Ep.	Original broadcast date	Average audience share	
Ep.	Original broadcast date	Nielsen Korea	
Ep.	Original broadcast date	Nationwide	Seoul
1	July 6, 2026	4.3% (10th)	4.0% (8th)
2	July 7, 2026	3.9% (10th)	3.4% (10th)
3	July 8, 2026	4.3% (8th)	3.7% (8th)
4	July 9, 2026	4.3% (9th)	4.1% (7th)
5	July 10, 2026	4.1% (12th)	4.6% (10th)
6	July 13, 2026	4.6% (9th)	4.1% (8th)
7	July 14, 2026	4.9% (9th)	4.6% (6th)
8	July 15, 2026	4.2% (8th)	4.1% (8th)
9	July 16, 2026	4.4% (8th)	4.2% (6th)
10	July 17, 2026	4.4% (10th)	4.4% (10th)
11	July 20, 2026	4.3% (9th)	4.0% (9th)
12	July 21, 2026	4.2% (10th)	4.0% (9th)
13	July 22, 2026	4.3% (9th)	4.0% (7th)
14	July 23, 2026	4.4% (8th)	4.3% (7th)
15	July 24, 2026	4.5% (9th)	4.1% (9th)
16	July 27, 2026	4.4% (10th)	4.0% (8th)
17	July 28, 2026	4.5% (9th)	4.4% (6th)
18	July 29, 2026	4.1% (10th)	4.0% (7th)
19	July 30, 2026	4.5% (8th)	4.1% (6th)
20	July 31, 2026	4.4% (12th)	4.3% (11th)
21	August 3, 2026	4.5% (9th)	4.0% (8th)
22	August 4, 2026	4.6% (9th)	4.2% (7th)
23	August 5, 2026	4.2% (9th)	4.0% (7th)
24	August 6, 2026	4.4% (9th)	4.1% (6th)
25	August 7, 2026	4.5% (13th)	4.5% (10th)
26	August 10, 2026	4.3% (11th)	4.2% (7th)
27	August 11, 2026	4.2% (9th)	3.7% (9th)
28	August 12, 2026	3.8% (10th)	3.1% (12th)
29	August 13, 2026	4.5% (9th)	3.9% (8th)
30	August 14, 2026	4.6% (11th)	4.3% (10th)
31	August 17, 2026	4.7% (11th)	4.3% (8th)
32	August 18, 2026	4.3% (9th)	3.8% (7th)
33	August 19, 2026	4.8% (9th)	4.6% (6th)
34	August 20, 2026	4.6% (8th)	4.4% (6th)
35	August 21, 2026	5.5% (8th)	5.2% (8th)
36	August 24, 2026	4.8% (9th)	4.7% (6th)
37	August 25, 2026	4.5% (9th)	4.3% (6th)
38	August 26, 2026	4.5% (7th)	4.1% (7th)
39	August 27, 2026	4.8% (7th)	4.5% (6th)
40	August 28, 2026	5.1% (9th)	4.8% (9th)
41	August 31, 2026	5.6% (7th)	5.8% (4th)
42	September 1, 2026	4.9% (7th)	4.9% (6th)
43	September 2, 2026	4.9% (7th)	4.7% (6th)
44	September 3, 2026	4.8% (6th)	4.8% (5th)
45	September 4, 2026	4.6% (9th)	4.5% (8th)
46	September 7, 2026	4.8% (9th)	4.7% (6th)
47	September 8, 2026	4.8% (6th)	5.1% (5th)
48	September 9, 2026	4.6% (9th)	4.3% (7th)
49	September 10, 2026	4.8% (6th)	4.8% (5th)
50	September 11, 2026	4.7% (9th)	4.4% (8th)
51	September 14, 2026	5.2% (5th)	5.0% (6th)
52	September 16, 2026	4.6% (8th)	4.4% (7th)
53	September 17, 2026	5.0% (5th)	5.1% (5th)
54	September 18, 2026	4.5% (7th)	4.4% (7th)
55	October 5, 2026	4.9% (9th)	5.0% (7th)
56	October 6, 2026	4.4% (8th)	3.9% (7th)
57	October 7, 2026	4.7% (7th)	4.5% (6th)
58	October 8, 2026	4.4% (10th)	4.1% (7th)
59	October 9, 2026	4.7% (8th)	4.4% (7th)
60	October 12, 2026	5.1% (7th)	5.2% (6th)
61	October 13, 2026	5.0% (9th)	5.1% (5th)
62	October 15, 2026	5.3% (5th)	5.3% (5th)
63	October 16, 2026	4.6% (8th)	4.3% (8th)
64	October 19, 2026	4.9% (10th)	4.6% (8th)
65	October 21, 2026	4.7% (8th)	4.4% (7th)
66	October 22, 2026	4.8% (8th)	4.2% (6th)
67	October 23, 2026	4.7% (7th)	4.7% (7th)
68	October 27, 2026	5.2% (7th)	5.2% (5th)
69	October 28, 2026	4.7% (8th)	4.4% (7th)
70	October 29, 2026	5.0% (8th)	4.8% (6th)
71	October 30, 2026	4.6% (10th)	4.5% (8th)
72	November 2, 2026	5.5% (6th)	5.4% (5th)
73	November 3, 2026	4.9% (9th)	4.8% (7th)
74	November 5, 2026	4.8% (8th)	4.5% (7th)
75	November 6, 2026	4.9% (8th)	5.1% (6th)
76	November 9, 2026	5.2% (9th)	5.1% (8th)
77	November 10, 2026	5.2% (8th)	4.9% (6th)
78	November 11, 2026	5.0% (8th)	4.8% (6th)
79	November 12, 2026	5.5% (5th)	5.4% (4th)
80	November 13, 2026	4.8% (8th)	4.6% (8th)
81	November 16, 2026	5.5% (7th)	5.5% (6th)
82	November 17, 2026	5.1% (8th)	4.9% (7th)
83	November 18, 2026	5.2% (7th)	5.2% (6th)
84	November 19, 2026	4.9% (8th)	4.8% (6th)
85	November 20, 2026	4.8% (9th)	4.7% (9th)
86	November 23, 2026		
87	November 24, 2026		
88	November 25, 2026		
89	November 26, 2026		
90	November 27, 2026		
Average		—	—
In the table above, the blue numbers represent the lowest ratings and the red numbers represent the highest ratings.
