= Doll Master =

- Theatrical poster
- Directed by: Jeong Yong-ki
- Written by: Jeong Yong-gi
- Produced by: Han Man-taek
- Starring: Kim Yoo-mi; Shim Hyung-tak; Ok Ji-young; Lee Ka-yeong; Im Hyung-joon
- Cinematography: Jo Cheol-ho
- Edited by: Nam Na-yeong
- Music by: Kim Woo-chul
- Distributed by: Lotte Cinema; Cineclick Asia
- Release date: 30 July 2004
- Running time: 90 minutes
- Country: South Korea
- Language: Korean
- Budget: $2 million

The Doll Master (Korean: 인형사; RR: Inhyeongsa) is a 2004 South Korean horror film directed by Jeong Yong-ki.

== Plot ==
60 years ago, a doll and a woman in a red kimono (Jeong Yu-mi) fell in love in the Korean countryside with a young doll-maker, and when they begin to date he makes a doll in her likeness. Not long after they get married, the woman in the red kimono is murdered, and the blame was put on the doll-maker. He was arrested but was released by the police due to the lack of evidence but was later killed by vigilantes in the woods. Not content to be without her maker, the doll, possessed by the woman's spirit, sat by his grave for all eternity.

In present day, Hae-mi (Kim Yoo-mi), a sculptor, Tae-seong (Shim Hyung-tak), a model looking for work, Young-ha (Ok Ji-young), a woman who talks to her doll like it's alive, Jung-ki (Im Hyung-joon), a photographer, and Sun-young (Lee Ka-yeong), a ditzy high school student, arrive at an isolated doll museum after receiving an invitation that dolls will be made in their image. They are greeted by siblings Choi Jin-wan (Chun Ho-jin), the museum's curator, and Im Jae-won (Kim Do-young), the paraplegic doll-maker.

Then, odd events begin to occur. Hae-mi catches sight of a mysterious young girl in a red dress who shows up repeatedly on the museum grounds. Tae-seong has an encounter with a doll that reaches out and touches him, and it is shown that the curator is keeping a man chained underground. Hae-mi talks to the girl in the red dress, learning that her real name is Mi-na (Lim Eun-kyung). Things take a nasty turn when someone destroys Young-ha's doll, and she becomes suicidal and hangs herself, causing the group to panic. Hae-mi attempts to find her red-dressed friend, but is alarmed to find a crying Mi-na with bloody hands. Mi-na suddenly asks Hae-mi why she doesn't recognize or remember her, before fleeing in tears. Inside the house, Sun-young and Jung-ki are both murdered.

Hae-mi finally remembers that when she was younger, she had a doll that she loved so much that it gained a soul, resulting in Mi-na. Tae-seong reveals himself to be a police officer who had come to investigate a recent murder at the museum, and handcuffs Hae-mi in suspicion. However, Im reveals that she is possessed by the red kimono woman's doll, who wants to avenge its maker and has come alive due to being inhabited by the spirit of the woman in the red kimono; all the guests Im invited are the descendants of the doll-maker's vigilante killers. Furthermore, Tae-song's great-grandfather is revealed to be the real killer of the wife of the dollmaker. Angry at being rejected by Hae-mi, Mi-na admits to murdering the other guests and kills Tae-seong before going after Hae-mi. She stops her murder attempt when she sees Hae-mi's scar, remembering the childhood incident where Hae-mi protected her. However, Im destroys Mi-na's soul before attempting to finish off Hae-mi.

Im's husband, the previously chained man, shoots Im and then kills the curator. He finds his dying wife, saying he regrets bringing the red kimono doll from the woods after all the trouble it caused. In the end, Hae-mi and Im's husband burn the dolls and the remaining corpses.

== Cast ==
- Kim Yoo-mi as Hae-mi, the sculptor
- Shim Hyung-tak as Tae-seong, the "model" who later reveals to be a police officer
- Ok Ji-young as Young-ha, the woman with the Demian doll
- Lee Ka-yeong as Sun-young, the ditzy high school student
- Im Hyung-joon as Jung-ki, the photographer
- Lim Eun-kyung as Mi-na, the soul of the doll Hae-mi once owned. She was later retrieved by Im Jae-won after being discarded.
- Chun Ho-jin as Choi Jin-wan, the museum's curator and Im's brother
- Kim Do-young as Im Jae-won, the museum's doll maker
- Jeong Yu-mi as woman in red kimono. She was the muse for the red kimono doll.
- Byeon Ju-yeon as young Hae-Mi
- Nam Myung-ryul as Im Jae-won's husband who was chained throughout the film

== Dolls ==
Although the story states that the dolls are decades old, many of them featured in the film are modern ball-jointed dolls. Some of the dolls such as Mi-na and Demian are a part of the "Event" series of "The AI" dolls from a Korean doll company called Custom House.

== Release ==
The Doll Master was released in South Korea on 30 July 2004. In the Philippines, the film was released by Viva Entertainment on 20 October 2004.
