= Lim Eun-kyung =

South Korean actress (born 1984)

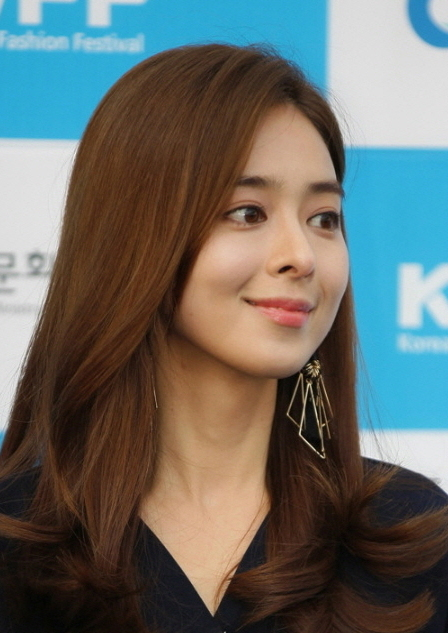
- Lim in 2015
- Born: July 7, 1984 (age 42); Seoul, South Korea
- Education: Chung-Ang University – Department of Theater
- Occupation: Actress
- Years active: 1999–present

Korean name
- Hangul: 임은경
- RR: Im Eungyeong
- MR: Im Ŭn'gyŏng

Lim Eun-kyung (Korean: 임은경; born July 7, 1984) is a South Korean actress. Lim first rose to fame as the "TTL Girl" in a series of SK Telecom commercials, then pursued a professional acting career. She starred in the films Resurrection of the Little Match Girl, Conduct Zero, Doll Master, and Marrying High School Girl.

== Early life ==
Lim Eun-kyung was born as an only child to deaf parents. She became fluent in Korean Sign Language. Her family's story was later published in 2006.

== Career ==
=== Modeling ===
Lim made her entertainment debut as a model for SK Telecom in 1999 when she was still in high school. TTL was a mobile phone service targeting the younger generation, especially those in their twenties. After appearing in a series of TTL ads, Lim's mysterious yet innocent looks attracted attention and popularity, and she became known as the "TTL Girl."

=== Acting ===
She made her acting debut in Jang Sun-woo's big-budget sci-fi blockbuster Resurrection of the Little Match Girl in 2002. But the film received mixed reviews, and became a box-office flop. Lim's performance was panned, with critics and audiences saying her unimpressive acting was merely a replay of her image in the TTL commercials.

Later in the year, she rebounded with her most commercially successful film, the 1980s-set teen comedy Conduct Zero. Lim received good reviews for transforming into a nerdy high school girl who becomes Ryoo Seung-bum's love interest. This performance earned her a Best New Actress nomination at the 2003 Korean Film Awards.

Lim then appeared in the popular television comedy series Bodyguard in 2003. She returned to the big screen in 2004, with leading roles in the horror films Doll Master and To Catch a Virgin Ghost, and the romantic comedy Marrying High School Girl. All three films did not do well at the box office.

After hosting the variety show !Exclamation Mark and starring in the short-lived sitcom Rainbow Romance, Lim stopped acting in 2006.

== Filmography ==
=== Film ===
Year	Title	Hangul	Role
2002	Resurrection of the Little Match Girl	성냥팔이 소녀의 재림	Little Match Girl
2002	Conduct Zero	품행제로	Min-hee
2004	Doll Master	인형사	Mi-na
2004	To Catch a Virgin Ghost	시실리 2 km	Song-yi
2004	Marrying High School Girl	여고생 시집가기	Ahn Pyung-gang
2015	Untouchable Lawmen	치외법권	In-jeong

=== Television ===
Year	Title	Hangul	Role	Network
2003	Bodyguard	보디가드	Na-young	KBS2
2005	Exclamation Mark	느낌표 진행자	Host	MBC
2005	Rainbow Romance	레인보우 로망스	Kim Eun-kyung	MBC
2006	Loving Insurance		Tong Xinyuan	Chinese television series
