= My Secret Romance =

South Korean 2017 TV series

- Promotional Poster
- Genre: Romance; Comedy
- Written by: Kim Ha-na; Kim Young-yoon
- Directed by: Kang Cheol-woo
- Starring: Sung Hoon; Song Ji-eun; Kim Jae-young; Jung Da-sol
- Country of origin: South Korea
- Original language: Korean
- No. of episodes: 13 (original broadcast); 14 (Japanese DVD compilation and oversees version)

Production
- Executive producers: Kang Seong-wook; Park Hyun; Lee Hyeong-hee
- Producers: Jeon Ju-ae; Park Suk; Kim Jong-won
- Running time: 45 minutes
- Production companies: Godin Media; DramaFever

Original release
- Network: OCN
- Release: April 17 – May 30, 2017

My Secret Romance (Korean: 애타는 로맨스; RR: Aetaneun romaenseu) is a 2017 South Korean television series starring Sung Hoon and Song Ji-eun. It aired on cable network OCN at 21:00 (KST) every Monday and Tuesday, from April 17 to May 30, 2017 for 13 episodes. It was also released on SK Telecom's "oksusu" mobile app.

My Secret Romance was selected in the 2017 Top Creator Audition held by KOCCA. The series is the first OCN drama to air on Monday and Tuesday, as well as the first romance-themed OCN drama.

== Synopsis ==
Jin-wook and Yoo-mi meet at a Gangwon-do resort and get caught up in a series of misunderstandings and accidents. Yoo-mi is there to attend her mother's second wedding while Jin-wook is there working as a bellhop (a position given to him by his Chairman father to teach him responsibility). Yoo-mi is charmed by Jin-wook's sly and playful personality, and they unexpectedly spend the night together on the beach. However, Yoo-mi disappears in the morning, leaving Jin-wook feeling perplexed and insulted.

Three years later, the two meet again when Yoo-mi becomes a nutritionist at the company cafeteria where Jin-wook works. It seems that once a playboy Jin-wook, has given up his carefree life and works at the company owned by his father. He has feelings for Yoo-mi and has kept her bra-pad as a memory of the night that they spent together. At first, he is strict toward her, though it is only because he is looking for reasons to be near her. He later confesses this to her and agrees to wait for her.

During the three years, Yoo-mi's mother has had a second child, Dong-goo, who is now three years old. Upon looking at Dong-goo, Jin-wook's father, the Chairman, mistakes him as Yoo-mi's son, not half-brother. The Chairman tells Jin-wook, admonishing him for having a child out of wedlock with a nutritionist. After finding this out, Jin-wook believes that he has wronged Yoo-mi and warms up to her, seeming to accept Dong-goo as his son. The misunderstanding is eventually cleared up but Yoo-mi gets upset at Jin-wook, accusing him of being with her only because he thought he had a child with her. Then enters a pretty girl, Joo Hye-ri (Jung Da-sol) who is deemed a "suitable" wife for Jin-wook. Yoo-mi's writer friend, Jung Hyun-tae (Kim Jae-young), is shown to have a secret crush on her. With all drama revolving around main characters' mothers, Cha Jin-wook and Lee Yoo-mi finally manage to keep their love strong, while also resolving their personal problems with their parents.

The drama ends with Hye-ri "traveling together" with Hyun-tae and Yoo-mi and Jin-wook attending Yoo-mi's mother's re-wedding and Jin-wook saying "Today is D-day. Do you know how much I've waited for this day?" and Yoo-mi replying "Me too."

== Cast ==
=== Main ===
- Sung Hoon as Cha Jin-wook (Gino Cha)

A prickly second generation chaebol and director of a company owned by his dad. He was playful and loved partying. After Yoo-mi disappeared from his sight, he turned into a hard-working and serious man while taking good care of his father's company.

- Song Ji-eun as Lee Yoo-mi (Yumi Lee)

A nutritionist who feels insecure about other people's opinions about her and her family. She is also scared to wear revealing clothes due to her mother's controversial reputation as an adult film actress.

- Kim Jae-young as Jung Hyun-tae (Jeffery Jung)

A successful travel writer and the owner of a book cafe. Warm and friendly, he is Yoo-mi's best friend. He has a crush on Yoo-mi, but he never tries to show it to her.

- Jung Da-sol as Joo Hye-ri (Annie Joo)

A young and beautiful announcer who is popular with men, but has an unrequited crush on Jin-wook.

=== Supporting ===
==== People around Jin-wook ====
- Lee Kan-hee as Kim Ae-ryung, Jin-wook's mother
- Kim Jong-goo as Cha Dae-bok, Jin-wook's father
- Park Shin-woon as Jang Woo-jin, Jin-wook's secretary

==== People around Yoo-mi ====
- Nam Gi-ae as Jo Mi-hee, Yoo-mi's mother
- Joo Sang-hyuk as Dong-goo, Yoo-mi's little brother
- Kim Si-young as Wang Bok-ja
- Im Do-yoon as Kang Je-ni
- Lee Hae-in as Jang Eun-bi
- Baek Seung-heon as Lee Shin-hwa

=== Special appearance ===
- Jeon So-min as Girl in the Club (Ep. 1)

== Original soundtrack ==
My Secret Romance OST album

Soundtrack album by Various Artists
- Genre: Soundtrack
- Label: Godin Media, Music&NEW; Elephant Media, LOEN Entertainment (Part 3 only)

=== Part 1 ===
No.	Title	Artists	Length
1.	"Same" (똑같아요)	Song Ji-eun, Sung Hoon	04:18
2.	"Same" (Inst.)		04:18
Total length:			08:36

=== Part 2 ===
No.	Title	Artists	Length
1.	"You Are the World of Me" (너뿐인 세상)	Sung Hoon	03:49
2.	"You Are the World of Me" (Singer Ver.)	Lee Shin-sung	03:49
3.	"You Are the World of Me" (Inst.)		03:49
Total length:			11:27

=== Part 3 ===
No.	Title	Artists	Length
1.	"Love Song" (이상해져가)	Eun Ji-won (Sechs Kies); Lee Su-hyun (I.B.I/DAYDAY); Kim Eun-bi (DAYDAY)	03:46
2.	"Love Song" (Inst.)		03:46
Total length:			07:32

=== Part 4 ===
No.	Title	Artists	Length
1.	"Love Is So Good"	Moon Myung-mi	02:45
2.	"Love Is So Good" (Acoustic Ver.)	Moon Myung-mi	02:45
3.	"Love Is So Good" (Inst.)		02:45
Total length:			08:15

== List of Episodes ==
Ep.	Title	Original broadcast date
1	The One Night Relationship (오늘만 보고 말 사이)	April 17, 2017
2	You've Deeply Insulted Me (넌 나에게 모욕감을 줬어)	April 18, 2017
3	My Insides Flip Like Buchimgae (부침개 뒤집히듯 내 속도 뒤집히고)	April 24, 2017
4	The Secret of the Jewelry Box (보석함의 비밀)	April 25, 2017
5	Playing with My Heart (들었다 놨다)	May 1, 2017
6	Let's Go to Work (갑시다, 일하러)	May 2, 2017
7	This Is How Business Is Done (비즈니스는 이렇게)	May 8, 2017
8	You're My Paderella (그대는 나의 뽕데렐라)	May 15, 2017
9	Tell Me the Truth (나에게 진실을 말해)	May 16, 2017
10	A Tender Farewell (다정하게, 안녕히)	May 22, 2017
11	I'm the Only One Who Can't Date (나만 안 되는 연애)	May 23, 2017
12	It's Time to Wake Up from This Dream (이제는 꿈에서 깰 시간)	May 29, 2017
13	You're My World, Tonight (온통 너뿐인 세상, 투나잇)	May 30, 2017
