= Ahn Woo-yeon =

South Korean actor

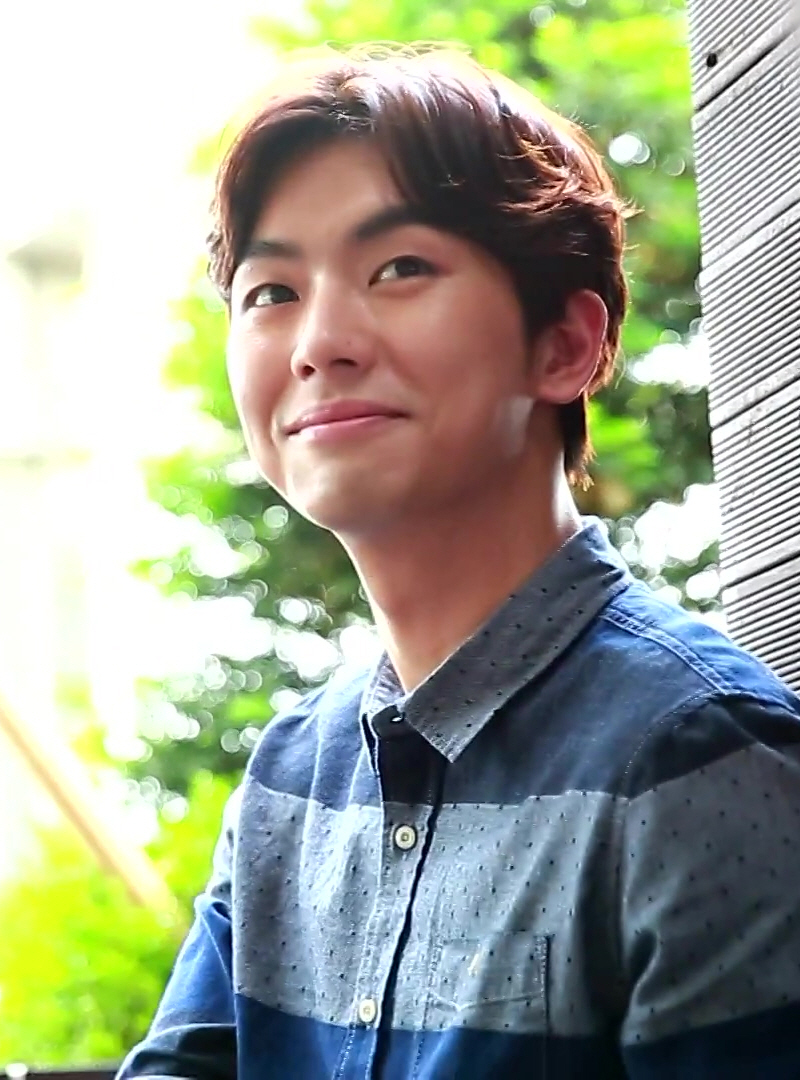
- Ahn in June 2016
- Born: Ahn Byeong-ho; January 7, 1991 (age 35); Ansan, South Korea
- Education: Seoul Institute of the Arts
- Occupation: Actor
- Agent: EL Park

Korean name
- Hangul: 안병호
- Hanja: 安秉浩
- RR: An Byeongho
- MR: An Pyŏngho

Stage name
- Hangul: 안우연
- RR: An Uyeon
- MR: An Uyŏn

Ahn Byeong-ho (born 7 January 1991), better known by his stage name Ahn Woo-yeon, is a South Korean actor. He starred in TV series such as Five Enough (2016), Don't Dare to Dream (2016) and Strong Girl Bong-soon (2017).

== Career ==
Ahn made his debut in theater through the play Realise Happiness. The cast lineup, unveiled on October 20, 2023 by Content Haap, included Ahn, Kim Seon-ho, and Lee Dong-ha, who were triple-cast in the roles of Kim Woo-jin, a character aspiring to become a photographer. The cast also featured Kim Seul-gi and Kim Na-young as Lee Eun-soo, along with Im Chul-soo, Lee Si-hyung, and Choi Jeong-heon as Jeong Ji-yong, as well as Lee Ji-hae, and Oh Se-mi as Seo Tae-young. The play, originally titled "Memory in Dream," was adapted to a Korean setting. It was staged at the TOM 2 Theater in Daehak-ro from December 5, 2023, to February 18, 2024.

== Filmography ==
=== Film ===
Year	Title		Role	Ref.
Year	English	Korean	Role	Ref.
2018	Concave Girl	오목소녀	Kim An-kyung	
2025	Crypto Man	폭락	Kang Ji-woo	

=== Television series ===
Year	Title		Role	Ref.
Year	English	Korean	Role	Ref.
2015	Alchemist	연금술사	Byeong Ho	
2015	My First Time	처음이라서	unknown	
2015	Bubblegum	풍선껌	Ye Joon-soo	
2016	Five Enough	아이가 다섯	Kim Tae-min	
2016	Don't Dare to Dream	질투의 화신	Oh Dae-goo	
2017	Strong Girl Bong-soon	힘쎈여자 도봉순	Do Bong-ki	
2017	Circle	써클: 이어진 두 세계	Kim Bum-gyun	
2017	Lovers in Bloom	무궁화 꽃이 피었습니다	Bong Yoon-jae (cameo)	
2017	Hello, My Twenties! 2	청춘시대2	Lee Jin-gwang	
2017	Hip Hop Teacher	힙한 선생	Lee Hwang	
2018	Number Woman Gye Sook-ja	숫자녀 계숙자	Lee Hae-joon	
2018	Nice Witch	착한마녀전	Oh Tae-yang	
2018	Let's Eat 3	식샤를 합시다 3	Sunwoo Sun	
2019	The Banker	더 뱅커	Seo Bo-geol	
2021	Writing Your Destiny	당신의 운명을 쓰고 있습니다	Hyun Joon [God of Destiny]	
2021	Mad for Each Other	미친 X	Lee Sang-yeop / Samantha [Unit 705]	
2021	Please Check the Event	이벤트를 확인하세요	Seo Ji-gang	
2021	Young Lady and Gentleman	신사와 아가씨	Park Dae-beom	
2023	Kokdu: Season of Deity	꼭두의 계절	Han Cheol	
2023	King the Land	킹더랜드	Gong Yoo-nam	
2025	I Dol I	아이돌아이	Kang Woo-seong	
2026	Doctor Shin	닥터신	Ha Yong-joong	

=== Web series ===
Year	Title	Role	Ref.
2025	Countdown to Death		

=== Web shows ===
Year	Title	Role	Notes	Ref.
2022	#Romantic City	Cast Member	in Hua Hin, Thailand	

== Stage ==
=== Theater ===
Theater play performances
Year	Title		Role	Venue	Date	Ref.
Year	English	Korean	Role	Venue	Date	Ref.
2023–2024	Realise Happiness	행복을 찾아서	Kim Woo-jin	Daehak-ro TOM 2	December 5 to February 18	

== Awards and nominations ==
Year	Award	Category	Nominated work	Result	Ref.
2018	26th SBS Drama Awards	Best New Actor	Nice Witch	Nominated	
2021	MBC Drama Awards	Excellence Award, Actor in a Short Drama	Please Check the Event	Nominated	
