= Kim Jae-kyung =

South Korean actress and singer (born 1988)

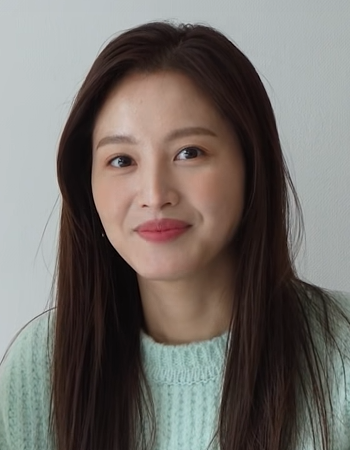
- Kim in January 2021
- Born: December 24, 1988 (age 37); Seoul, South Korea
- Education: Dongduk Women's University (Fashion Design)
- Occupation: Actress
- Years active: 2009–present
- Agent: Namoo Actors
- Spouse: Unknown (m. 2024)
- Family: Kim Jae-hyun (brother)
- Musical career
- Genre: K-pop
- Instrument: Vocals
- Years active: 2009–2016; 2019
- Label: DSP
- Formerly of: Rainbow; Rainbow Blaxx

Korean name
- Hangul: 김재경
- Hanja: 金栽經
- RR: Gim Jaegyeong
- MR: Kim Chaegyŏng
- Website: namooactors.com

Kim Jae-kyung (Korean: 김재경; born December 24, 1988) is a South Korean actress and former singer. Before transitioning to acting full-time, she was a member and leader of the South Korean girl group Rainbow.

== Early life and education ==
Kim was born in Seodaemun District, Seoul, South Korea on December 24, 1988. She studied at Deungchon High School and Dongduk Women's University, where she majored in Fashion Design. Her brother is N.Flying's Jaehyun.

== Career ==
=== Pre-debut ===
She was a trainee at JYP Entertainment before switching to DSP Media. While under DSP Media, in 2007 she was asked if she wanted to debut as a member of Kara. Kim turned the offer down because she thought she would be happy with her Rainbow members. In 2007, she was asked to join SM Entertainment, hinting at the possibility that she may have joined Girls' Generation. In 2008, she appeared in SS501's song "A Song Calling For You" music video before debuting as a Rainbow member.

=== 2009–2016: Rainbow, Rainbow Blaxx, solo activities ===
Kim debuted as leader of girl group Rainbow on November 12, 2009, with the release of mini album Gossip Girl. The group's first broadcast performance of "Gossip Girls" was held at MBC's music show Show! Music Core on November 14, 2009.

In 2010, she became a cast member in the variety television show Honey Jar. That same year, she also became a cast member in the school variety show 100 Points Out of 100.

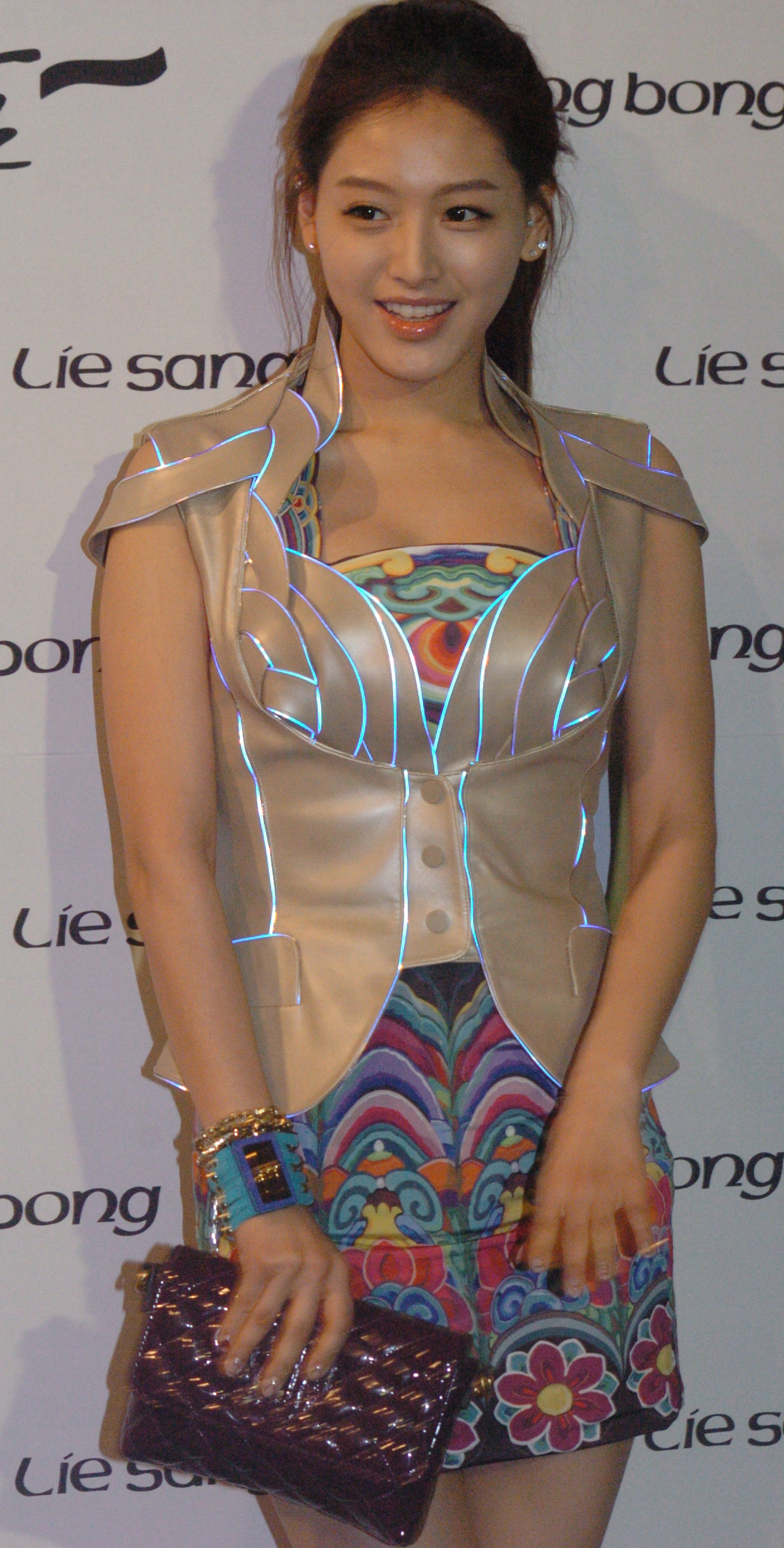
Kim in 2012

On March 31, 2012, Kim had her first leading role as Na Yoo-mi in the JTBC's drama Monster. Later that year, she became a cast member in the variety television show Law of the Jungle W.

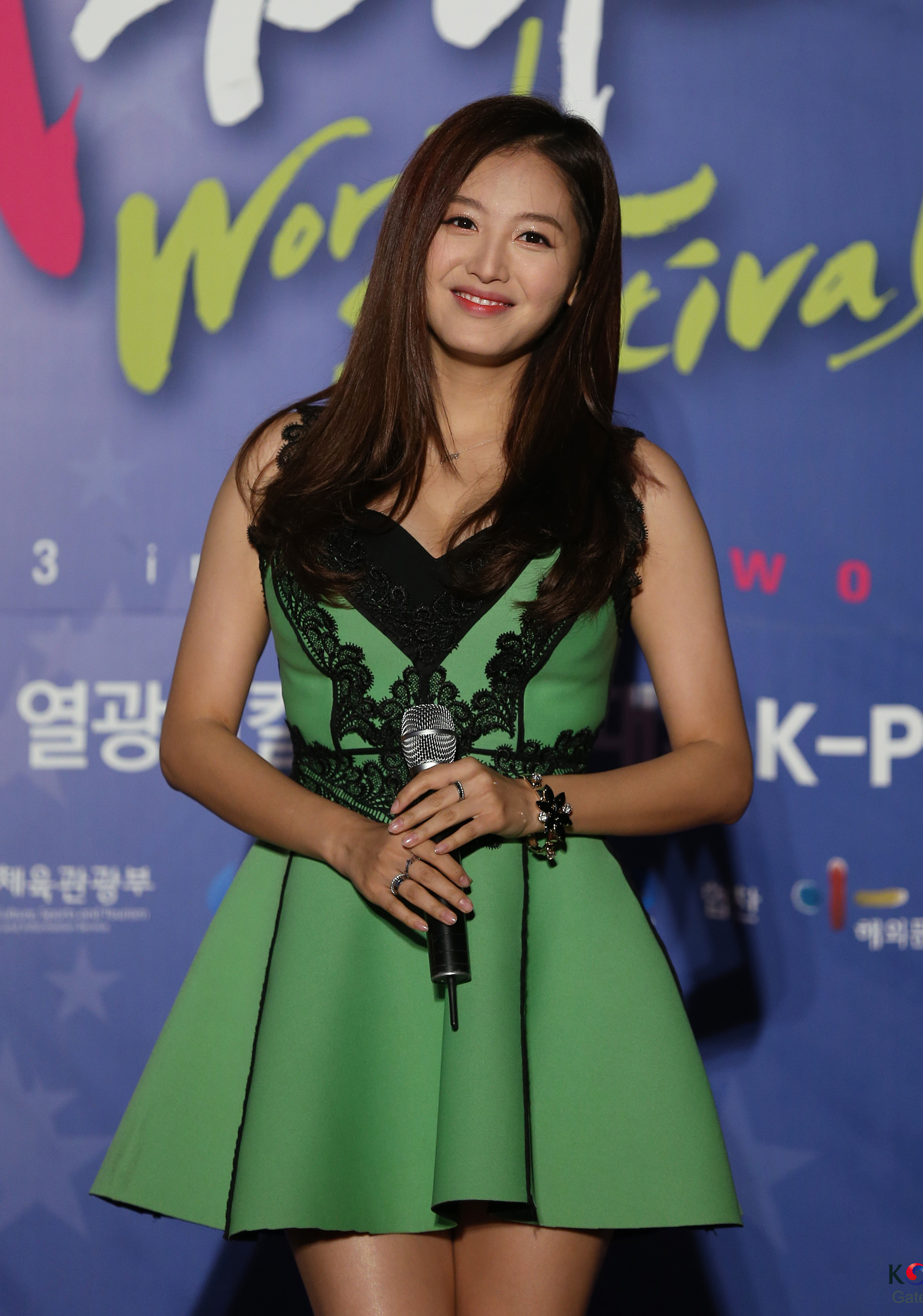
Kim during 2013 K-Pop World Festival

In December 2013, she was confirmed for tvN's new reality program, The Genius: Rule Breaker, with 12 other representative figures from different fields of work such as TV personalities, politicians, gamblers, and more. She was the second person eliminated.

Jaekyung, Woori, Seungah, and Hyunyoung debuted as Rainbow Blaxx, the second official sub-unit of Rainbow, in 2014. The group released their first mini album titled RB Blaxx on January 20, 2014.

Kim was cast in a supporting role in the 2014 drama Inspiring Generation. In 2014, she was also part of the main cast in Quiz of God 4. On January 12, 2014, she was a guest on Running Man.

In 2015, she entered the main cast of tvN's Always Cantare 2. She also starred in Noble, My Love as Cha Yoon-seo, a veterinarian who runs her own animal hospital, across from Sung Hoon.

In 2016, she became a host on Beauty Bible, alongside Jessica Jung.

On October 27, 2016, it was confirmed that Rainbow would be disbanding following the expiration of the members' contracts. In December 2016, Kim signed with new management agency Namoo Actors to start afresh as an actress.

=== 2017–present: Acting roles ===
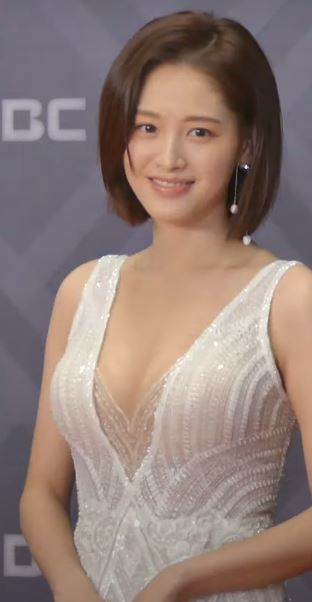
Kim in 2018

In 2018, Kim was cast in Life on Mars as Han Mal-sook. Later that year she appeared as part of the main cast in Bad Papa as Cha Ji-woo, the youngest female lieutenant.

In 2019, Kim appeared as Veronica Park, the CEO of a film production company and an heiress with an audacious personality, in The Secret Life of My Secretary. This led to her being nominated for Best Supporting Actress at the 2019 SBS Drama Awards.

In 2021, Kim appeared in The Devil Judge as Oh Jin-joo, an associate judge who idolizes Yo-han (Ji Sung).

In 2022, Kim appeared as Kim Han-mi, a former delinquent and current reporter who assists Hee-woo (Lee Joon-gi) against corrupt officials, in Again My Life.

== Personal life ==
On December 16, 2024, Namoo Actors confirmed reports that Kim had married her non-celebrity boyfriend the past summer.

== Discography ==
=== Soundtrack appearances ===
Title	Year	Album
"I Love You, I Like You" (with Cho Hyun-young)	2010	Secret Agent Miss Oh OST
"You and I"	2011	City Hunter OST
"Maybe"	2014	Quiz of God 4 OST
"Is It the Start?" (with Sung Hoon)	2015	Noble, My Love OST

== Filmography ==
Key
†	Denotes films that have not yet been released

=== Films ===
Year	Title	Role	Notes	Ref.
2010	Heartbeat	Girl group member	Cameo	
2021	A Way Station	Han Ji-ah		

=== Television series ===
Year	Title	Role	Notes	Ref.
2010	Big Thing	Herself (Rainbow)	Cameo	
2012	Monster	Na Yoo-mi	Lead	
2012	Family	Yoon Yoo-mi	Cameo	
2013	Reply 1994	Jun Ji-hyun	Cameo	
2014	Inspiring Generation	Meiling		
2014	Quiz of God	Im Tae-kyung	Season 4	
2014	Turning Point	Maeng Ran-young		
2014	My Lovely Girl	Radio DJ	Cameo	
2016	Madame Antoine: The Love Therapist	Jyoo Ni		
2018	The Miracle We Met	Mao	Cameo	
2018	Life on Mars	Han Mal-sook		
2018	Bad Papa	Cha Ji-woo		
2019	The Secret Life of My Secretary	Veronica Park		
2021	The Devil Judge	Oh Jin-joo		
2022	Again My Life	Kim Han-mi		
2026	Kidnap Game	Nam Ah-yoon		
2026	Reverse †	Hui-su	Lead	

=== Web series ===
Year	Title	Role	Notes	Ref.
2015	Noble, My Love	Cha Yoon-seo	Lead role	

=== Television shows ===
Year	Title	Role	Notes	Ref.
2010	Honey Jar	Cast member		
2010–2011	100 Points Out of 100	Cast member		
2012	Law of the Jungle W	Cast member		
2013–2014	The Genius: Rule Breaker	Contestant		
2015	Get It Beauty	Co-host		
2015	Always Cantare 2	Cast member		
2016	Beauty Bible	Co-host	With Jessica Jung	
2017	King of Mask Singer	Contestant	As "A Monstrous Net" (Episode 101)	

== Awards and nominations ==
Name of the award ceremony, year presented, category, nominee of the award, and the result of the nomination
Award ceremony	Year	Category	Nominee / Work	Result	Ref.
MBC Drama Awards	2018	Best Supporting Actress in a Monday-Tuesday Drama	Bad Papa	Won	
SBS Drama Awards	2019	Best Supporting Actress	The Secret Life of My Secretary	Nominated	
SBS Drama Awards	2022	Best Supporting Actress in a Miniseries Genre/Fantasy Drama	Again My Life	Won	
