= Sung Hoon (actor) =

South Korean actor (born 1983)

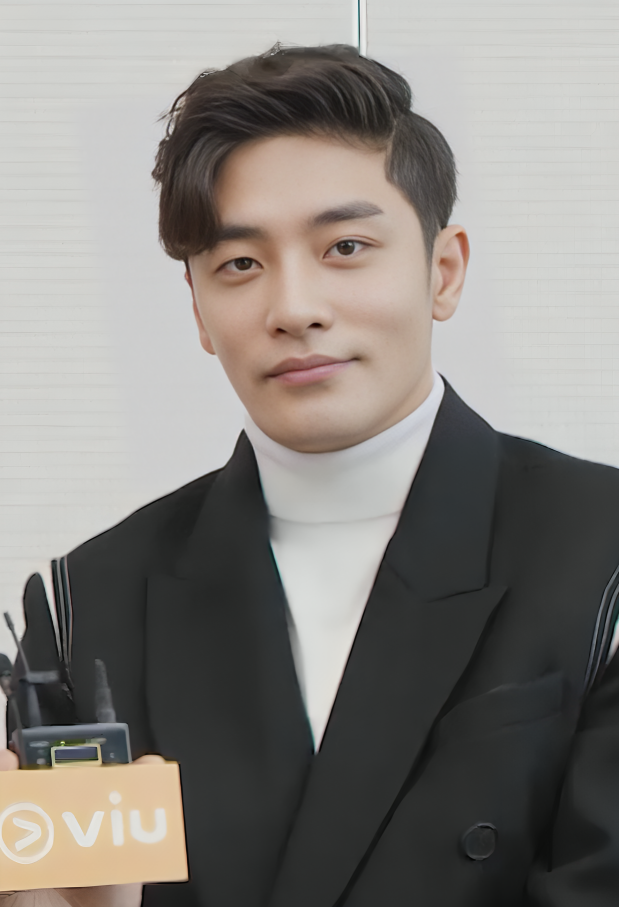
- Sung Hoon in June 2022
- Born: Bang In-gyu; February 14, 1983 (age 43); Nam District, Daegu, South Korea
- Education: Kyungwoon Middle School, Daegu; Dalseong High School, Daegu; Yong In University, majoring in Sociology and Physical Education
- Occupations: Actor; model
- Years active: 2009–present
- Agent: Stallion Entertainment
- Height: 1.85 m (6 ft 1 in)

Korean name
- Hangul: 방성훈
- RR: Bang Seonghun
- MR: Pang Sŏnghun

Former name
- Hangul: 방인규
- RR: Bang Ingyu
- MR: Pang In'gyu

Bang Sung-hoon (Korean: 방성훈; born February 14, 1983), born Bang In-gyu and known professionally as Sung Hoon, is a South Korean actor and model.

== Early life ==
Sung Hoon's birth name is Bang In-gyu but he legally changed his name to Bang Sung-hoon because since he was young, he was often sick and had many surgeries. He revealed the reason in a variety show I Live Alone in episode 312. He was a swimming champion at his University and specialized in butterfly stroke. He swam for 14 years but had to quit because of a spinal injury. He then enlisted in the military, but the same injury sent him home early. Sung Hoon then went on and became a swimming trainer. He debuted as an actor in 2009 with White Brown's Because I Love You.

== Career ==
=== 2011–2012: First acting roles and commercial success ===
Sung Hoon's breakthrough role was in the supernatural romance drama, New Tales of Gisaeng. His performance in this drama earned him a New Star Award at 2011 SBS Drama Awards.

In 2012, he was cast in his first Chinese drama, The Bodyguard. The same year, he featured in historical drama Faith, playing an antagonist role. Later that year, he was cast in the daily drama, The Birth of a Family.

=== 2013–2015: Acting setback and return to television ===
In 2013, Sung Hoon starred as the lead role in the weekend drama, Passionate Love. In 2014, Sung Hoon starred in the web drama 6 Persons Room, where he played a construction safety engineer who suffers an injury and finds himself in a hospital surrounded by strange patients.

In 2015, Sung Hoon starred in the web drama Noble, My Love, and featured in KBS's romantic comedy series Oh My Venus playing a professional MMA fighter.

Sung Hoon is also a musical disc jockey, and conducts DJ activities under the name Roiii. Sung Hoon has performed in various countries such as China, Hong Kong, Thailand, Malaysia, Singapore and Indonesia.

=== 2016–2017: Rising popularity ===
In 2016, Sung Hoon returned to the Korean small screen with KBS's weekend drama Five Enough, playing a model turned professional golfer, where his pairing with Shin Hye-sun gained popularity among the viewers.

In 2017, Sung Hoon starred in the romantic comedy drama My Secret Romance, in which he played a second-generation chaebol. He then played an entertainment company producer in The Idolmaster KR, which is based on The Idolmaster Japanese video game. The same year, Sung Hoon was cast in the romance-fantasy film Are You in Love? opposite Kim So-eun. The film premiered in 2020.

=== 2018–present: Resurgence and comeback to television ===
In 2018, Sung Hoon's debut action film Brothers in Heaven was released in January. He acted alongside Jo Han-sun as fraternal twins. He was also cast in the sitcom, The Sound of Your Heart: Reboot, as well as the romantic comedy web drama I Picked Up a Celebrity on the Street.

In 2019, Sung Hoon returned to small screen with the romantic comedy drama Level Up playing a character of a company restructuring expert.

By the end of 2020, Sung Hoon returned to web drama with My Secret Star playing a character of a Hallyu star who is hiding a big secret and meets an entertainment journalist who risked her life to get on the scoop, played by Vietnamese actress Hoàng Yến Chibi.

In 2021, Sung Hoon starred as a lawyer who have trouble in maintaining his marriage in season 1 & 2 drama Love (ft. Marriage and Divorce). In 2022, he played the role of Raphael in the SBS romantic comedy drama Woori the Virgin based on American series Jane the Virgin, reuniting with New Tales of Gisaeng co-star Im Soo-hyang.

== Philanthropy ==
Sung Hoon became the first Korean actor to hold a fan meeting in Brazil and donate all of the proceeds to Brazilian flood victims. On May 10, 2024, Sung Hoon held a solo fan meeting titled 'MOMENTO SECRETO COM SUNG HOON' at Espaço Unimed in São Paulo, Brazil; 2,400 fans attended.

== Filmography ==
=== Film ===
Year	Title	Role
2018	Brothers in Heaven	Tae-sung
2020	Are You in Love?	Seung Jae

=== Television series ===
Year	Title	Role	Notes	Ref.
2011	New Tales of Gisaeng	Ah Da-mo		
2012	The Bodyguard	Guo Xu		
2012	Faith	Chun Eum-ja		
2012	The Birth of a Family	Han Ji-hoon		
2013	Passionate Love	Kang Moo-yeol		
2015	Oh My Venus	Jang Joon-sung		
2016	Five Enough	Kim Sang-min		
2017	My Secret Romance	Cha Jin-wook		
2017	The Idolmaster KR	Kang Shin-hyuk		
2017	Jugglers	Lee Kyung-joon	Cameo (Ep. 1)	
2019	Level Up	Ahn Dan-te		
2021	Love (ft. Marriage and Divorce)	Pan Sa-hyun	Season 1–2	
2022	Woori the Virgin	Raphael		
2023	Perfect Marriage Revenge	Seo Do-guk		
2025	The Defects		Cameo	
2026	What a Boss Wants	Kwon Do-hyuk		

=== Web series ===
Year	Title	Role	Notes	Ref.
2014	6 Persons Room	Min-soo		
2015	Noble, My Love	Lee Kang-hoon		
2018	The Sound of Your Heart: Reboot	Jo Seok		
2018	I Picked Up a Celebrity on the Street	Kang Joon-hyuk		
2021	So I Married the Anti-fan	Choi Jae-hee	Cameo (Ep. 5, 13, 14 & 15)	
2021	My Secret Star	Jin	Arirang TV YouTube channel	video
2023–2024	Death's Game	Song Jae-seop	Cameo	

=== Television shows ===
Year	Title	Role	Notes	Ref.
2012	Let's Go! Dream Team Season 2	Swimming Team	Episode 124 (Coach Bang team, won gold medal with Jang Minho)	
2015	Our Neighborhood Arts and Physical Education	Swimming Team	Episode 113–124	
2017–2022	I Live Alone	Cast Member	Episode 212–431	
2017	Law of the Jungle	Cast Member	Wild New Zealand (Episode 265–268)	
2018	Law of the Jungle	Cast Member	Sabah, Malaysia (Episode 325–329)	
2018	Carefree Travellers	Cast Member	Season 2 (Episode 1–11)	
2020	기맥힌브로 (Gimmac Hinbro)	Cast Member	Episode 1–4	

=== Hosting ===
Year	Event	Note	Ref.
2019	18th FINA World Championships Gwangju 2019	MC for the 18th FINA World Championships Gwangju 2019 Eve Festival	
2020	12th DMZ International Documentary Film Festival	MC for opening ceremony with announcer, Lin Hyun Joo	

=== Music video appearances ===
Year	Title	Artist	Album	Ref.
2009	"Because I Love You" (사랑하기 때문에)	White Brown	Non-album single	video
2010	"Promise Me" (약속해줄래)	Oh Yun Hye (오윤혜) ft. Red Roc (레드락)	Promise Me	video
2013	"Just the Two of Us" (둘이서 한잔해)	Davichi	Mystic Ballad	video
2015	"Sunlight"	Crayon Pop's Geummi ft. Sung Hoon	6 Persons Room	video
2016	"Climax" (클라이막스)	Nop.K (Feat. Hoon.J)	Climax	video
2016	"Dream"	Real Girls Project	Non-album single	video
2021	"Lost"	Sung Hoon	Non-album single	

== Musical theater ==
Year	Title	Role	Ref.
2014	Summer Snow	Dr. Yoonjae	

== Theater ==
Year	Title	Role	Ref.
2024	Art	Serge	

== Discography ==
=== Singles ===
Title	Year	Album
"Sunlight" (with Geummi)	2016	6 Persons Room OST
"Has It Started?" (시작인가요) (with Kim Jae-kyung)	2016	Noble, My Love OST
"Has It Started?" (시작인가요)	2016	Noble, My Love OST
"Same" (똑 같아요) (with Song Ji-eun)	2017	My Secret Romance OST
"You Are the World of Me" (너뿐인 세상)	2017	My Secret Romance OST
"Nothing Is Easy" (쉬운 게 없구나)	2017	My Secret Romance OST
"Pumping Jumping"	2017	Non-album single
"Think About You" (자꾸 널 생각해)	2018	I Picked Up a Celebrity on the Street OST
"With You Forever" (모든 날 함께해) (with Lee Min-young)	2021	Love (ft. Marriage and Divorce) Season 1 OST
"It Will Be Okay" (괜찮아)	2021	Love (ft. Marriage and Divorce) Season 2 OST
"For You"	2021	Love (ft. Marriage and Divorce) Season 2 OST
"I'll Be With You" (있어줄게)	2022	Woori the Virgin OST Part 6
"Truth" (사실은)	2023	Perfect Marriage Revenge OST Part 6

== Ambassadorship ==
- 2019 - Honorary Ambassador for 18th FINA World Championships Gwangju 2019
- 2021 - Daegu's Public Relations Ambassador

== Awards and nominations ==
Name of the award ceremony, year presented, category, nominee of the award, and the result of the nomination
Award ceremony	Year	Category	Nominee / Work	Result	Ref.
APAN Star Awards	2016	Excellence Actor in a Serial Drama Award	Five Enough	Nominated	
Asia Artist Awards	2016	Best Choice Award	Sung Hoon	Won	
Asia Artist Awards	2017	Best Entertainer Award	Sung Hoon	Won	
Asia Artist Awards	2018	Favorite Award	Sung Hoon	Won	
Asia Artist Awards	2021	Best Acting Award	Sung Hoon	Won	
Asia Model Awards	2018	Korean Model Star	Sung Hoon	Won	
KBS Drama Awards	2016	Best New Actor	Five Enough	Won	
KBS Drama Awards	2016	Best Couple Award	Sung Hoon with Shin Hye-sun; Five Enough	Nominated	
MBC Entertainment Awards	2018	Best Entertainer in Variety Category (Male)	I Live Alone	Won	
MBC Entertainment Awards	2018	Rookie Award in Variety Category (Male)	I Live Alone	Nominated	
MBC Entertainment Awards	2019	Excellence Award in Variety Category (Male)	I Live Alone	Won	
MBC Entertainment Awards	2019	Best Teamwork Award	Sung Hoon (with Henry Lau, Kian84, Lee Si-eon); I Live Alone	Won	
MBC Entertainment Awards	2020	Top Excellence Award in Variety Category (Male)	I Live Alone	Won	
MBC Entertainment Awards	2020	Best Couple Award	Sung Hoon (with Son Dam-bi); I Live Alone	Nominated	
MTN Ad Festival Awards	2020	Commercial Star Award	Sung Hoon	Won	
SBS Drama Awards	2011	New Star Award	New Tales of Gisaeng	Won	
SBS Drama Awards	2022	Top Excellence Award, Actor in a Miniseries Romance/Comedy Drama	Woori the Virgin	Nominated	
SBS Drama Awards	2022	Best Couple Award	Sung Hoon (with Im Soo-hyang and Shin Dong-wook); Woori the Virgin	Nominated	
StarHub Night of Stars Award	2019	StarHub Dazzling Star Award	Sung Hoon	Won	
