= 5th APAN Star Awards =

2016 edition of award ceremony

- Date: October 2, 2016
- Site: MBC Sangam Culture Plaza, Sangam-dong, Seoul
- Hosted by: Shin Dong-yup; Lee Hanee

The 5th APAN Star Awards ceremony was held on October 2, 2016 at MBC Sangam Culture Plaza, Sangam-dong, Seoul. Shin Dong-yup and Lee Hanee were the host of the award ceremony. First held in 2012, the annual awards ceremony recognizes the excellence in South Korea's television. The nominees were chosen from 63 Korean dramas that aired on broadcasting networks MBC, KBS and SBS and cable channels tvN, jtbc, OCN, MBN and TV Chosun from September 1, 2015 to September 30, 2016.

The highest honor of the ceremony, Grand Prize (Daesang), was awarded to the actor Song Joong-ki of the drama series Descendants of the Sun.

== Nominations and winners ==
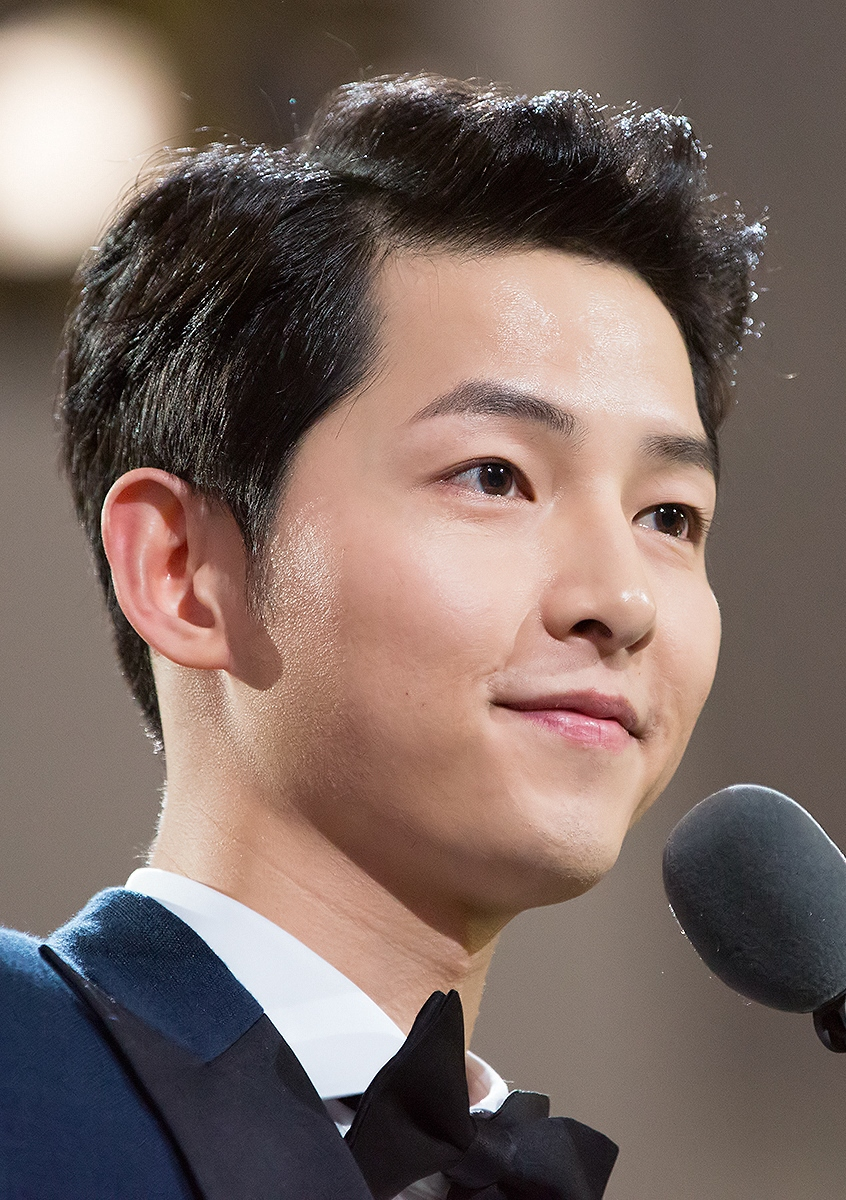
Song Joong-ki — Grand Prize (Daesang) winner for Descendants of the Sun

Winners are listed first, highlighted in boldface, and indicated with a dagger (†).

**Grand Prize (Daesang)**: **Song Joong-ki** - **Descendants of the Sun** †
**Top Excellence Award, Actor in a Miniseries**: **Cho Jin-woong** - **Signal** †; Kim Rae-won - The Doctors; Lee Jong-suk - W; Song Joong-ki - Descendants of the Sun	**Top Excellence Award, Actress in a Miniseries**: **Han Hyo-joo** - **W** †; Kim Hye-soo - Signal; Park Shin-hye - The Doctors; Song Hye-kyo - Descendants of the Sun
**Top Excellence Award, Actor in a Serial Drama**: **Ahn Jae-wook** - **Five Enough** †; Choi Min-soo - The Royal Gambler; Go Soo - Flowers of the Prison; Kim Myung-min - Six Flying Dragons	**Top Excellence Award, Actress in a Serial Drama**: **Kim So-yeon** - **Happy Home** †; Choi Kang-hee - Glamorous Temptation; Shin Se-kyung - Six Flying Dragons; So Yoo-jin - Five Enough
**Excellence Award, Actor in a Miniseries**: **Namkoong Min** - **Remember** †; Eric Mun - Another Miss Oh; Kim Woo-bin - Uncontrollably Fond; Park Hae-jin - Cheese in the Trap	**Excellence Award, Actress in a Miniseries**: **Seo Hyun-jin** - **Another Miss Oh** †; Bae Suzy - Uncontrollably Fond; Kim Ah-joong - Wanted; Uee - Marriage Contract
**Excellence Award, Actor in a Serial Drama**: **Lee Pil-mo** - **Happy Home** †; Jang Keun-suk - The Royal Gambler; Kang Ji-hwan - Monster; Sung Hoon - Five Enough	**Excellence Award, Actress in a Serial Drama**: **Jeong Yu-mi** - **Six Flying Dragons** †; Hong Eun-hee - Working Mom Parenting Daddy; So Yi-hyun - Secrets of Women; Won Mi-kyung - Happy Home
**Acting Award, Actor**: **Jin Goo** - **Descendants of the Sun** †; **Kim Eui-sung** - **W** †; Choi Moo-sung - Reply 1988; Lee Seung-joon - Descendants of the Sun; Ma Dong-seok - Squad 38	**Acting Award, Actress**: **Kim Ji-won** - **Descendants of the Sun** †; **Ye Ji-won** - **Another Miss Oh**†; Jeon Hye-bin - Another Miss Oh; Kim Sun-young - Reply 1988; Oh Yeon-seo - Come Back Mister
**Best New Actor**: **Park Bo-gum** - **Reply 1988** †; **Yoon Kyun-sang** - **The Doctors** †; Kang Min-hyuk - Entertainer; Kim Min-seok - Descendants of the Sun; Kwak Si-yang - Second to Last Love	**Best New Actress**: **Kim Yoo-jung** - **Love in the Moonlight** †; **Lee Hye-ri** - **Reply 1988** †; Kim Go-eun - Cheese in the Trap; Nana - The Good Wife; Park So-dam - Cinderella with Four Knights
**Rising Star Award**: **Hwang Chi-yeul** †; **Darren Wang** †	**Best Production Director**: **Shin Won-ho** - **Reply 1988** †
**Best Writer**: **Kim Eun-hee** - **Signal** †	**Drama of the Year**: **Descendants of the Sun** †
**Best Couple Award**: **Song Joong-ki** and **Song Hye-kyo** - **Descendants of the Sun** †; Jin Goo and Kim Ji-won - Descendants of the Sun; Kim Rae-won and Park Shin-hye - The Doctors; Lee Jong-suk and Han Hyo-joo - W; Eric Mun and Seo Hyun-jin - Another Miss Oh	**Best APAN Star Award**: **Kim Hee-sun** †; **Jessy Mendiola** †; **Hiroki Narimiya** †; **Song Joong-ki** †; **Joe Taslim** †; **Thanayong Wongtrakun** †
**Global Star Award**: **Lee Byung-hun** †	**Best Manager**: **Kim Jeong-yong** - **Blossom Entertainment** †
**Special Actor of the Year**: **Jun Kunimura** †	**Special APAN Award**: **Gökhan Alkan** and **Zeynep Çamcı**†
