= Five Enough =

South Korean television series

- Promotional poster of Five Enough, containing the drama's catchphrase Two plus three equals five (둘 + 셋 = 다섯)
- Also known as: Five Children; Five Kids
- Genre: Family drama
- Written by: Jung Hyun-jung; Jung Ha-na
- Directed by: Kim Jung-gyu
- Starring: see main cast
- Country of origin: South Korea
- Original language: Korean
- No. of episodes: 54

Production
- Executive producers: Bae Kyung-soo (KBS); Lee Sang-baek (AStory Co., Ltd.)
- Producer: Kim Jung-hyun
- Running time: 60 minutes
- Production company: AStory

Original release
- Network: KBS2
- Release: February 20 – August 21, 2016

Five Enough (Korean: 아이가 다섯; RR: Aiga daseot; lit. 'Five Children') is a 2016 South Korean television series starring Ahn Jae-wook, So Yoo-jin, Shim Hyung-tak, Shim Yi-young, Im Soo-hyang, Shin Hye-sun, Sung Hoon and Ahn Woo-yeon. It aired on KBS2 from February 20 to August 21, 2016, for 54 episodes.

== Synopsis ==
This is the story of five pairs of lovers and their families. The principal pair are Lee Sang-tae (Ahn Jae-wook) and Ahn Mi-jung (So Yoo-jin). Sang-tae is a widower who has raised two children with the help of his overbearing in-laws, the parents of his deceased wife, played by Choi Jung-woo as Jang Min-ho and Song Ok-sook as Park Ok-soon; while Mi-jung is divorced with three young children. Her ex-husband, Yoon In-chul (Kwon Oh-joong) cheated on her with her former best friend Kang So-young (Wang Bit-na). She does not tell her children or her feisty grandmother, who lives with them and looks after the children, that her ex-husband and best friend have gotten married. Instead she pretends he has been working in America. However, when he and So-young, along with So-young's mother, open a bakery not too far from Mi-jung's apartment, it becomes inevitable that the secret will come out.

Sang-tae, who is gentlemanly and reserved, is a team leader of the marketing group in charge of the Fantom sportswear brand. Early in the series, Mi-jung, who has a somewhat fiery temper, meets him when she becomes an assistant manager in the same group. Both are highly capable at their jobs. Sang-tae somewhat involuntarily becomes involved in Ahn Mi-jung's family problems. Gradually, the two fall in love with each other, but their relationship is not well received by their families. In particular, Sang-tae's in-laws have come to treat the widower of their deceased daughter as if he were their own son, and they resist the idea of his dating or marrying, lest he move out and take his children with him to a new home. Meanwhile, Sang-tae's parents would like him to remarry, although before meeting Mi-jung he had shown no inclination to do so as he, and especially his children, were living comfortably with his in-laws. But when his mother finds out that Mi-jung is divorced with three young children, she also opposes the couple's developing relationship.

At the same time, Sang-tae's shy younger sister, Lee Yeon-Tae (Shin Hye-sun), has had a secret crush on her university classmate, Kim Tae-min (Ahn Woo-yeon), for seven years, but has never had the nerve to confess to him. Tae-min had a crush on her for a time but could never penetrate Yeon-tae's wall of shyness. Just as Yeon-tae finally musters up the courage to confess, Tae-min meets Sang-tae's sister-in-law, Jang Jin-joo (Im Soo-hyang). Jin-joo is beautiful and outgoing, but an academic lightweight whose wealthy parents largely ignore her in favor of Sang-tae and his children, and try to buy her affection with a car and credit cards, which they try to use as means to control her. She easily befriends Tae-min and the two fall for each other, leaving Yeon-tae heartbroken. Yeon-tae later gets drunk at a club, and by coincidence ends up in a car with Kim Sang-min (Sung Hoon), Tae-min's brother, whose cellphone she accidentally walks off with. This results in a series of prickly meetings between the two, during the course of which Sang-min, who is a successful pro golfer and former fashion model, falls hard for Yeon-tae. He vigorously pursues her, but she at first and for a long time rebuffs him. Complicating matters for Sang-min is that he has an endorsement deal with Sang-tae and Mi-jung's company, Fantom, and he is a famously difficult celebrity, but he is forced to moderate his behavior as he comes to realize that Yeon-tae is Sang-tae's sister. Another key plot point is that neither Yeon-tae realizes that Sang-min and Tae-min are brothers, nor does Sang-min realize that Yeon-tae and Tae-min, having just graduated from teacher training school, are friends and working at the same school (which four of the five children attend - Mi-jung's youngest is too young to be in school).

The final pair is Sang-tae's younger brother, Lee Ho-tae (Shim Hyung-tak), a film director who runs out of money to make his movie, and has become homeless and unemployed and thus forced to return home, where he is not welcome, and Mo Soon-young (Shim Yi-young), a former dancer who now waits tables at the Lee family restaurant, although she doesn't realize that he is her employer's son, and he somehow doesn't realize that she works for his parents.

The series takes us through the love lives of the five couples, the difficulties they face from their various parents, and, in the case of Sang-tae and Mi-jung, their challenges in bringing their five children together, which prove problematic even though four of the children were already friends at school.

== Cast ==
=== Main characters ===
- Ahn Jae-wook as Lee Sang-tae: A single father of two children after the death of his wife. Team Leader of the marketing team at Fantom fashion corporation.
- So Yoo-jin as Ahn Mi-jung: A single mom of three children, a hard-working, well-spoken employee on the Fantom marketing team.
- Shim Hyung-tak as Lee Ho-tae: A jobless man, once a film director. Lee Sang-tae's younger brother.
- Shim Yi-young as Mo Soon-young: A former waitress. Lee Ho-tae's first love turned wife.
- Ahn Woo-yeon as Kim Tae-min: An elementary school teacher. Sang-min's younger brother and Yeon-tae's friend, Jin-joo's love interest. Teaches at the same school as Yeon-tae. (He and Yeon-tae secretly had a crush on each other for seven years.) Yoon Woo-young and Lee Soo are in his class.
- Im Soo-hyang as Jang Jin-joo: A college drop-out who loves to shop. Sang-tae's sister-in-law and Yeon-tae's friend, Tae-min's love interest.
- Sung Hoon as Kim Sang-min: A model turned professional golfer, Yeon-tae's love interest
- Shin Hye-sun as Lee Yeon-tae: A shy elementary school teacher. Sang-tae's younger sister, Jang Jin-joo's friend and Tae-min's friend, Sang-min's love interest. Yoon Woo-ri and Lee Bin are in her class.

=== Supporting characters ===
==== Sang-tae's family ====
- Jang Yong as Lee Shin-wook: Sang-tae's father. Sit-down restaurant proprietor.
- Park Hye-sook as Oh Mi-sook: Sang-tae's mother, restaurant proprietor's wife.
- Jo Hyun-do as Lee Soo, son, age 11, plays cello, raised by wealthy maternal grandparents
- Kwon Soo-jung as Lee Bin, daughter, age 9, plays piano, dreams of being an actress, raised (possibly spoiled) by wealthy maternal grandparents

==== Mi-jung's family ====
- Sung Byung-sook as Jang Soon-ae: Mi-jung's grandmother, age 75
- Jung Yoon-seok as Yoon Woo-young, son, age 11, learned responsibility at an early age
- Kwak Ji-hye as Yoon Woo-ri, daughter, age 9, dreams of being an actress
- Choi Yoo-ri as Yoon Woo-joo, daughter, age 5, inseparable from her pet rock "Woo-jin" which she says is her baby brother

==== Jin-joo's family ====
- Choi Jung-woo as Jang Min-ho: Jin-joo's father, wealthy former loan shark with elementary-school education
- Song Ok-sook as Park Ok-soon: Jin-joo's mother, also never made it to high school. This couple lavishes their grandchildren (Soo and Bin) with everything money can buy to cover the pain of the loss of their older daughter. They mostly ignore Jin-joo.
- "Brain" - The housekeeper with a university education who constantly gives advice. Min-ho and Ok-soon, having never learned any English, call their maid "Brain" because they think it means "housekeeper."
- "Driver Park" the chauffeur

==== Sang-min and Tae-min's Family ====
The parents are wealthy retired professors who spend most of their time living on an island. They value intellect and education and thus dote on their second son (Tae-min), a teacher of modest means, and ignore their older son (Sang-min), the renowned pro golfer.

- Park Hae-mi as Cha Min-kyung, Tae-min & Sang-min's mother
- Go In-Beom as Kim Seung-wook, Tae-min & Sang-min's father

==== Kang So-young's family ====
- Wang Bit-na as Kang So-young: Ahn Mi-jung's friend and Yoon In-chul's new wife.
- Kim Chung as Lee Jum-sook, So-young's mother, proprietor of a bakery/café. She pays the child support for In-chul and Mi-jung's three children.
- Kwon Oh-joong as Yoon In-chul: Ahn Mi-jung deadbeat ex-husband. He married the woman he had an affair with.

==== Marketing team ====
- Jun Se-hyun as Chun Sung-hee - she has a crush on Team Leader Sang-tae.
- Lee Chan-hee as Park Hae-sung
- Hae Bit-na as Yoo Young-jae

==== Other ====
- Kim Hyun as Helper
- Lee Ji-ha as Counselor
- Kim Ji-eun as Sang-tae's blind date partner (episode 5)
- ----- as Manager Do (Kim Sang-min's manager)
- ----- as Yeong-mi (episode 6)

== Ratings ==
In the tables below, the blue numbers represent the lowest ratings and the red numbers represent the highest ratings.

Episode #	Original broadcast date	Average audience share			
Episode #	Original broadcast date	TNmS Ratings		AGB Nielsen	
Episode #	Original broadcast date	Nationwide	Seoul National Capital Area	Nationwide	Seoul National Capital Area
1	February 20, 2016	24.3% (2nd)	22.3% (2nd)	24.6% (2nd)	25.8% (2nd)
2	February 21, 2016	26.9% (2nd)	24.6% (2nd)	26.5% (2nd)	26.4% (2nd)
3	February 27, 2016	23.7% (2nd)	21.9% (2nd)	22.4% (2nd)	23.0% (2nd)
4	February 28, 2016	27.9% (2nd)	27.7% (2nd)	27.1% (2nd)	27.7% (2nd)
5	March 5, 2016	23.5% (1st)	22.0% (1st)	23.6% (1st)	24.5% (1st)
6	March 6, 2016	27.3% (1st)	24.2% (1st)	27.7% (1st)	28.9% (1st)
7	March 12, 2016	24.4% (1st)	21.1% (1st)	23.3% (1st)	24.2% (1st)
8	March 13, 2016	27.8% (1st)	26.2% (1st)	27.2% (1st)	27.5% (1st
9	March 19, 2016	24.7% (1st)	22.9% (1st)	25.6% (1st)	26.3% (1st)
10	March 20, 2016	30.4% (1st)	28.1% (1st)	30.1% (1st)	30.9% (1st)
11	March 26, 2016	23.8% (1st)	22.7% (1st)	23.2% (1st)	23.4% (1st)
12	March 27, 2016	28.3% (1st)	26.3% (1st)	28.2% (1st)	29.5% (1st)
13	April 2, 2016	23.0% (1st)	22.2% (1st)	23.2% (1st)	23.3% (1st)
14	April 3, 2016	29.4% (1st)	27.9% (1st)	30.7% (1st)	31.3% (1st)
15	April 9, 2016	24.2% (1st)	22.4% (1st)	23.4% (1st)	24.4% (1st)
16	April 10, 2016	29.5% (1st)	27.9% (1st)	29.7% (1st)	30.6% (1st)
17	April 16, 2016	25.3% (1st)	24.7% (1st)	25.6% (1st)	25.7% (1st)
18	April 17, 2016	26.4% (1st)	25.6% (1st)	27.3% (1st)	27.4% (1st)
19	April 23, 2016	24.2% (1st)	23.2% (1st)	24.2% (1st)	24.5% (1st)
20	April 24, 2016	28.9% (1st)	27.4% (1st)	29.3% (1st)	30.0% (1st)
21	April 30, 2016	24.2% (1st)	23.4% (1st)	22.5% (1st)	23.0% (1st)
22	May 1, 2016	26.6% (1st)	26.1% (1st)	26.9% (1st)	27.3% (1st)
23	May 7, 2016	20.4% (1st)	19.6% (1st)	21.2% (1st)	21.0% (1st)
24	May 8, 2016	26.2% (1st)	23.9% (1st)	25.9% (1st)	26.1% (1st)
25	May 14, 2016	23.5% (1st)	22.7% (1st)	24.3% (1st)	24.1% (1st)
26	May 15, 2016	28.6% (1st)	26.8% (1st)	31.0% (1st)	31.8% (1st)
27	May 21, 2016	22.7% (1st)	20.5% (1st)	23.2% (1st)	22.4% (1st)
28	May 22, 2016	28.7% (1st)	27.5% (1st)	30.0% (1st)	30.7% (1st)
29	May 28, 2016	24.0% (1st)	22.4% (1st)	24.8% (1st)	24.0% (1st)
30	May 29, 2016	28.5% (1st)	27.2% (1st)	29.8% (1st	30.6% (1st)
31	June 4, 2016	24.6% (1st)	23.6% (1st)	25.0% (1st)	24.7% (1st)
32	June 5, 2016	26.9% (1st)	25.9% (1st)	27.0% (1st)	27.2% (1st)
33	June 11, 2016	23.8% (1st)	22.7% (1st)	26.5% (1st)	26.7% (1st)
34	June 12, 2016	27.8% (1st)	28.5% (1st)	30.8% (1st)	30.1% (1st)
35	June 18, 2016	23.9% (1st)	24.7% (1st)	25.4% (1st)	25.5% (1st)
36	June 19, 2016	29.5% (1st)	29.5% (1st)	29.0% (1st)	28.8% (1st)
37	June 25, 2016	25.3% (1st)	26.0% (1st)	25.6% (1st)	24.5% (1st)
38	June 26, 2016	29.1% (1st)	29.3% (1st)	30.9% (1st)	30.8% (1st)
39	July 2, 2016	26.3% (1st)	24.6% (1st)	26.8% (1st)	25.0% (1st)
40	July 3, 2016	31.3% (1st)	29.1% (1st)	31.0% (1st)	29.8% (1st)
41	July 9, 2016	26.3% (1st)	24.1% (1st)	25.6% (1st)	25.1% (1st)
42	July 10, 2016	29.3% (1st)	29.1% (1st)	30.6% (1st)	30.0% (1st)
43	July 16, 2016	26.4% (1st)	25.5% (1st)	28.9% (1st)	28.9% (1st)
44	July 17, 2016	29.3% (1st)	28.8% (1st)	31.6% (1st)	32.6% (1st)
45	July 23, 2016	28.5% (1st)	27.4% (1st)	27.8% (1st)	28.8% (1st)
46	July 24, 2016	32.2% (1st)	31.3% (1st)	32.1% (1st)	31.7% (1st)
47	July 30, 2016	27.5% (1st)	27.6% (1st)	26.4% (1st)	26.1% (1st)
48	July 31, 2016	30.6% (1st)	31.4% (1st)	30.1% (1st)	30.0% (1st)
49	August 6, 2016	28.2% (1st)	26.7% (1st)	28.6% (1st)	29.2% (1st)
50	August 7, 2016	33.4% (1st)	31.2% (1st)	32.1% (1st)	31.9% (1st)
51	August 13, 2016	24.9% (1st)	24.2% (1st)	24.1% (1st)	23.5% (1st)
52	August 14, 2016	29.8% (1st)	28.4% (1st)	28.6% (1st)	28.5% (1st)
53	August 20, 2016	28.0% (1st)	26.2% (1st)	27.1% (1st)	27.2% (2nd)
54	August 21, 2016	33.5% (1st)	32.6% (1st)	32.8% (1st)	33.4% (1st)
Average		26.9%	25.7%	27.2%	27.3%

== Awards and nominations ==
Year	Award	Category	Recipient	Result
2016	5th APAN Star Awards	Top Excellence Award, Actor in a Serial Drama	Ahn Jae-wook	Won
2016	5th APAN Star Awards	Top Excellence Award, Actress in a Serial Drama	So Yoo-jin	Nominated
2016	5th APAN Star Awards	Excellence Award, Actor in a Serial Drama	Sung Hoon	Nominated
2016	9th Korea Drama Awards	Special Jury Prize	So Yoo-jin	Won
2016	30th KBS Drama Awards	Daesang (Grand Prize)	Ahn Jae-wook	Nominated
2016	30th KBS Drama Awards	Top Excellence Award, Actor	Ahn Jae-wook	Nominated
2016	30th KBS Drama Awards	Top Excellence Award, Actress	So Yoo-jin	Nominated
2016	30th KBS Drama Awards	Excellence Award, Actor in a Serial Drama	Ahn Jae-wook	Won
2016	30th KBS Drama Awards	Excellence Award, Actor in a Serial Drama	Shim Hyung-tak	Nominated
2016	30th KBS Drama Awards	Excellence Award, Actress in a Serial Drama	So Yoo-jin	Won
2016	30th KBS Drama Awards	Excellence Award, Actress in a Serial Drama	Im Soo-hyang	Nominated
2016	30th KBS Drama Awards	Best Supporting Actress	Shin Hye-sun	Nominated
2016	30th KBS Drama Awards	Best New Actor	Sung Hoon	Won
2016	30th KBS Drama Awards	Best New Actress	Shin Hye-sun	Nominated
2016	30th KBS Drama Awards	Best Young Actor	Jung Yoon-seok	Won
2016	30th KBS Drama Awards	Best Young Actor	Jo Hyun-do	Nominated
2016	30th KBS Drama Awards	Best Couple	Sung Hoon & Shin Hye-sun	Nominated
