= Bodyguard (South Korean TV series) =

2003 Korean television series

- Promotional poster for Bodyguard
- Genre: Action; Romance; Comedy
- Written by: Lee Han; Yeom Il-ho; Kwon Min-soo
- Directed by: Jeon Ki-sang
- Starring: Cha Seung-won; Lim Eun-kyung; Han Go-eun
- Country of origin: South Korea
- Original language: Korean
- No. of episodes: 22

Production
- Executive producer: Lee Nok-young
- Producer: Choi Ji-young
- Production location: Korea
- Running time: 60 minutes Saturdays and Sundays at 19:50 (KST)

Original release
- Network: Korean Broadcasting System
- Release: 5 July – 14 September 2003

Bodyguard (Korean: 보디가드; RR: Bodigadeu) is a 2003 South Korean television series starring Cha Seung-won, Lim Eun-kyung and Han Go-eun. It aired on KBS2 from July 5 to September 14, 2003 on Saturdays and Sundays at 19:50 for 22 episodes.

== Plot ==
Since Kyung-tak was forced to resign from his military post due to the fault of his superior, he is jobless and tries to make a living helping out at his parents' restaurant. As luck would have it, while applying for a new job, he saves a client of Yoo-jin's, a bodyguard, which results in Kyung-tak becoming employed by the security firm where she works, which is run by Sung-soo. Kyung-tak's life is headed for further changes as Na-young moves into town with her grandmother and becomes friends with his younger sister Kyung-mi.

== Cast ==
- Cha Seung-won as Hong Kyung-tak
- Lim Eun-kyung as Na-young
- Han Go-eun as Park Yoo-jin
- Song Il-kook as Han Sung-soo
- Lee Se-eun as Han Shin-ae, Sung-soo's younger sister
- Lee Won-jong as Bang Man-bok
- Baek Il-seob as Kyung-tak's father
- Park Jung-soo as Kyung-tak's mother
- Jang Se-jin as Choi Tae-sung
- Kim Young-ok as Na-young's maternal grandmother
- Yoon Yong-hyun as Yoo-sung
- Kim Young-joon as Se-joon
- Maya as Hong Kyung-mi, Kyung-tak's younger sister
- Lee Joo-seok as Yoon-shik
- Shin Choong-shik as Sung-soo's father
- Hyun Bin as the stalker

== Awards ==
2003 Grimae Awards

- Best Actor: Cha Seung-won

2003 KBS Drama Awards

- Top Excellence Award, Actor: Cha Seung-won
- Popularity Award: Cha Seung-won
- Popularity Award: Han Go-eun
- Best New Actress: Maya
