= Resurrection of the Little Match Girl =

2002 South Korean film

- Poster for Resurrection of the Little Match Girl (2002)
- Hangul: 성냥팔이 소녀의 재림
- Hanja: 성냥팔이 少女의 再臨
- RR: Seongnyangpari sonyeoui jaerim
- MR: Sŏngnyangp'ari sonyŏŭi chaerim
- Directed by: Jang Sun-woo
- Written by: In Jin-mi; Jang Sun-woo
- Produced by: Yoo in-taek
- Starring: Lim Eun-kyung; Kim Hyun-sung; Kim Jin-pyo
- Cinematography: Kim Woo-hyung
- Edited by: Han Seung-ryeong; Kim Hyeon
- Music by: Dalpalan; Jung Jae-il
- Distributed by: Kihwik Cine
- Release date: July 26, 2002 (South Korea)
- Running time: 123 minutes
- Country: South Korea
- Language: Korean

Resurrection of the Little Match Girl (Korean: 성냥팔이 소녀의 재림; RR: Seongnyangpari sonyeoui jaerim) is a 2002 South Korean action film. It was screened at the 2003 London Film Festival and was the opening film of the Fantasia Festival that same year.

The film was inspired by the 1845 Hans Christian Andersen tale "The Little Match Girl".

== Plot ==
The story is set in modern Korea. The Match Girl wanders the streets, trying to sell her matches. No one will buy any, and stores kick her out. Cold and hungry, she tries to warm her hands with the matches. A passersby tells her she should sniff the fumes instead, which she does. Feeling no more hunger or cold, she sees the snowflakes turn into cherry petals, and in the midst of the beautiful scenery she dies in the street.

Ju and his friend Lee are entertaining two young women in a bar. Lee is a popular StarCraft player in a tournament. Ju is more interested in his meal and leaves alone. He works as a delivery boy, humiliated by his employer. He wants to be a great gamer like his friend Lee, who wins the tournament and becomes a professional.

Ju hangs out at the game arcade, where he meets the Match Girl and buys a lighter. He follows the girl, but she is joined by another man, so Ju follows them from a distance. They leave on a boat, and Ju wakes in front of the arcade, holding the lighter but the Match Girl is gone. He searches but finds no sign of her. He calls the number on the lighter and is greeted by a welcome message to the game "Resurrection of the Little Match Girl". After hearing an explanation of the game and its dangers, Ju joins. He must let the girl die, but she must die thinking of him as her beloved.

Ju is then shown some of the characters he must save the Match Girl from. An organ harvester's plans are foiled by a small gang and a female gunslinger who rides a motorcycle. Ju later meets this woman, her name is Lara and she is described as a lesbian. Ju begs her to take him as a student, but she rejects him.

The gang plans to attempt to rape the Match Girl, during which their leader would show up to save her, beating up his underlings to win her heart. but another gang shows up and captures the girl. Lara battles them, but she is knocked out and is saved from death by Ju's intervention. They chase the gangsters to a night club, where Lara is wounded after a gun fight.

The leader orders Lara to be killed, but then gets a call from the System. Ju is shown to be a suspected virus and he is targeted instead. Ju is on his way to the hospital with Lara when he is told that if he goes to the hospital he will lose. Ju abandons Lara and takes her guns and motorcycle. Ju is soon being chased by soldiers, and as he runs from them he is saved by the designer of the System, who hides in the world disguised as a fisherman. He also meets his friend Lee, who lets him go.

Ju finds the Match Girl and takes her to a restaurant while evading the soldiers. The next morning the girl wakes beside him and leaves with his machine gun. The girl continues to sell her lighters but now she retaliates with her gun when rejected. She quickly becomes a popular icon. After further failed attempts by the gangsters and soldiers to capture her she threatens to shoot herself if approached. The soldiers withdraw, but gangster leader talks to her - she hates him for killing her boyfriend, and she might use her last bullets on him. She shoots the lovesick gangster, but as he dies he says he did not kill her boyfriend - the System did. The Match Girl is taken away to be reprogrammed.

Ju finds the System designer fishing at the pier and asks for his advice. He is told to ask for a mackerel where he met Lara. The mackerel turns out to be a powerful toy gun. Armed with the mackerel and joined by Lara, who was saved by the designer, Ju attacks the System itself. After a battle leading to the System building, Lara is killed and Ju enters alone.

Inside, he encounters a changing virtual world and enemies emerging from everywhere. He can sense where the Match Girl is and runs through various landscapes to her. He meets Lee again, and after Ju defeats him they walk to the System core. Lee is shot but Ju is allowed to enter alone.

Ju is congratulated for his performance, however he is too late - the Match Girl has already been reprogrammed and does not recognize him. In a desperate attempt to reach her Ju is killed, and the words "Game Over" appear. Ju stares at the game screen and then returns to being a delivery boy.

Another version of the game's ending is shown. In this version, Ju asks to give the lighter back to the Match Girl, and he is allowed to do so. As he hands it to her, his tear falls on the girl's hand. This time as the girl is led away she seizes a machine gun and shoots them. The girl chases a butterfly out to the sea, shooting at it while running on the waves, but she misses. She is shot in the back and sinks. Ju dives in and saves her. He then shoots the butterfly, causing the world to shatter.

Ju awakes in an unknown place, where he lives with the Match Girl, who has forgotten everything about her past.

== Cast ==
- Lim Eun-kyung — Little Match Girl
- Kim Hyun-sung — Ju
- Kim Jin-pyo — Lee
- Jin Xing — Lala
- Myung Gye-nam
- Jung Doo-hong — Oberan
- Kangta — Special Guest Star
- Lee Chung-ah
- Lee Han-garl — Orunpal
- Seo Jae-kyeong

== Awards ==
Grand Bell Awards (2003)

- Best Art Direction (Choi Jeong-hwa)
- Best Costume Design
- Best Visual Effects (Cha Soo-min, Hwang Hyun-kyu, Kim Sung-hoon)

== See also ==
- Andromedia
- Mardock Scramble
