= Noble, My Love =

South Korean web series

- Original title: 고결한 그대
- Genre: Romance; Comedy
- Written by: Go Gyul
- Directed by: Kim Yang-hee
- Starring: Sung Hoon; Kim Jae-kyung
- Country of origin: South Korea
- Original language: Korean
- No. of seasons: 1
- No. of episodes: 20

Production
- Camera setup: Single-camera
- Running time: 15 min
- Production company: Godin Media

Original release
- Network: Naver TV; Viki
- Release: July 23 – September 16, 2015

Noble, My Love (Korean: 고결한 그대) is a 2015 South Korean web drama starring Sung Hoon and Kim Jae-kyung, broadcast by Naver TV. It surpassed one million views before the last episode aired.

A chance meeting with a veterinarian turns a successful CEO's life around.

== Synopsis ==
Lee Kang Hoon (Sung Hoon) is a wealthy heir who is attractive, but he cares little for the feelings of other people. Cha Yoon Seo (Kim Jae-kyung) is a cheerful and lovely veterinarian who runs her own animal hospital. After the two meet in an unexpected crisis, can feelings of dislike turn into feelings of love?

== Plot ==
Cha Yoon Seo runs an animal hospital in Dalsan-ri, South Korea. In the first episode, Cha Yoon Seo ends up in Seoul for a veterinarian reunion. On her way back from the reunion, she stops at a convenience store where she has a chance meeting with Lee Kang Hoon, the CEO of a famous corporation D.O.L. In episode 2, Lee Kang Hoon is kidnapped and eventually stabbed by the kidnappers. Lee Kang Hoon is able to fight his way out of the situation but, due to his injury, he ends up on the front step of the animal hospital. Cha Yoon Seo stitches up Lee Kang Hoon and he ends up falling asleep at the animal hospital. When he awakens, he calls his secretary and gets a ride home. While in the car, Lee Kang Hoon gets a call from his mother inquiring where he has been and then immediately starts telling him he needs to go on blind dates so that he can get married.

In the next few episodes, Lee Kang Hoon wishes to repay Cha Yoon Seo by buying her a new animal hospital in Seoul so that she can acquire more business. Cha Yoon Seo does not appreciate the gesture as he does everything in his power to force her to take the offer. She eventually caves and opens the Apsung Animal Hospital in Seoul. Eventually, as Lee Kang Hoon and Cha Yoon Seo get to know each other, Lee Kang Hoon proposes a contract relationship so that Lee Kang Hoon's mother stops pushing him to go on blind dates. While in the contract, Lee Kang Hoon and Cha Yoon Seo begin to develop feelings for each other and begin to officially date. However, once Lee Kang Hoon's mother comes into town, she does not approve of the relationship. Cha Yoon Seo is from rural South Korea and her parents own an apple orchard. As such, she is considered lower class and not considered worthy of Lee Kang Hoon, according to the mother's standards.

Lee Kang Hoon's mother wishes to test Cha Yoon Seo's love/loyalty to Lee Kang Hoon and tries to force her to sign another contract. The contract has strict rules which Cha Yoon Seo refuses to sign. Afterwards, Cha Yoon Seo goes back home to help her family at the orchard and refresh. However, Lee Kang Hoon is determined to marry Cha Yoon Seo and ends up finding her at the orchard where they are reunited. Lee Kang Hoon and Cha Yoon Seo ended up marrying each other and they live happily ever after.

== Cast ==
- Sung Hoon as Lee Kang-hoon
- Kim Jae-kyung as Cha Yoon-seo
- Park Eun-seok as Woo Sang-hyun
- Kim Dong-suk as Lee Kang-joon
- Park Shin-woon as Secretary Kang
- Lee Seung-un as Heo Jin-yung
- Seo Young as Moon Yoo-ra
- Lee Bit-na as Choi Ra-mi
- Seo Geun-soo as Cha Yoon-soo

== Episodes ==
No.	Title
1	"A Doomed Fate, Fated Doom" "의영 같은 인연, 인연 같은 의연"
2	"On a Stormy Night" "폭풍우 치는 밤에"
3	"How a Stalker Handled Curiosity" "호기심에 대처하는 스토커의 자세"
4	"A Lottery or a Nightmare?" "로또인가, 악몽인가?"
5	"The Powerful and the Weak are Already Decided" "'갑'과 '을'은 정해 졌다"
6	"I Need That Woman" "그 여자가 필요 해"
7	"Let's Go Out" "우리, 연애합시다"
8	"First Rule of Contract Relationship – Love Fiercely" "연애 계약 1조: 빡세게 사랑하라"
9	"Sweet Yet Scary Date" "달콤 살벌한 데이트"
10	"Green Light – Light is On" "그린라이트"
11	"Cinderella – Throw Away Your Glass Slipper" "신데렐라 유리구두를"
12	"A Lie – It Was a Mistake" "새빨간거짓말 – 실수였어"
13	"Truth in Wine – I Like You" "쥐중진담 – 그쪽이 좋아요"
14	"A Man Whom You Can't Help but Love" "본능적으로- 사랑할 수부ㅏ에 없는남자"
15	"Confidentiality Agreement, No Physical Contact, No Invasion of Privacy" "비밀보장, 스킨십 금물, 사생활노터치"
16	"It's Not a Mistake This Time" "이번엔, 실수가아니야"
17	"Jealousy – The Most Honest Feeling" "질투 – 가정직한감정"
18	"One Summer Night's Dream – You Don't Want to Wake Up" "한여름밤의꿈 – 깨고싶지않은"
19	"Marry Me – The Worst Proposal" "나와 결혼해줘 – 최악의 프러포즈"
20	"My Dear Love" "서로 상, 생각사 – 보고싶은그대에게"

== International Broadcasting ==
- Pakistan – H Now Entertainment (Coming Soon)
