= Welcome Rain to My Life =

2012 South Korean TV series

- Promotional poster
- Hangul: 내 인생의 단비
- RR: Nae insaengui Danbi
- MR: Nae insaengŭi Tanbi
- Genre: Romance; Melodrama
- Written by: Go Bong-hwang
- Directed by: Park Yong-soon
- Starring: Lee Da-hee; Shim Hyung-tak; Ryu Sang-wook; Shin Joo-ah; Kim Hae-in
- Country of origin: South Korea
- Original language: Korean
- No. of episodes: 106

Production
- Executive producer: Park Hyung-ki
- Producer: Kim Ki-bum
- Production location: Korea
- Running time: Mondays to Fridays at 08:40 (KST)

Original release
- Network: Seoul Broadcasting System; ONE TV ASIA
- Release: 2 April – 31 August 2012

Welcome Rain to My Life (Korean: 내 인생의 단비) is a 2012 South Korean television series starring Lee Da-hee, Shim Hyung-tak, Ryu Sang-wook, Shin Joo-ah and Kim Hae-in. The morning soap opera aired on SBS from April 2 to August 31, 2012, on Mondays to Fridays at 8:40 a.m. for 106 episodes.

== Plot ==
The series revolves around Han Dan-bi (Lee Da-hee), a rude woman who was raised in a wealthy family. Her life becomes difficult after her father, a once-popular singer, meets with an accident that was planned by his wife. Dan-bi then finds out that she was adopted. Her stepmother takes advantage of her husband's comatose state to kick Dan-bi out of their house, all in a plot to sell his land to the ruthless chairman of a hospital company.

This revelation leads Dan-bi to begin searching for her birth mother by using her adoptive father's will as leverage, not knowing that the truth about what happened to her birth father is directly tied to the chairman. She encounters several people along the way: the chairman's grandson who falls for Dan-bi but is uncertain of the outcome if they became a couple; a divorced lawyer whom Danbi loves, but whose father is also connected to her birth father, which is the reason why the lawyer's mother disapproves of Dan-bi for her son; the lawyer's ex-wife, and their daughter who likes Dan-bi more than her own mother; a step-sister who sees Dan-bi as a roadblock to climbing the corporate ladder; and an ailing doctor who was not only the love of Dan-bi's adoptive father's life, but knows the real truth about Dan-bi's parentage.

== Cast ==
- Lee Da-hee as Han Dan-bi, the main protagonist
- Shim Hyung-tak as Lee Seung-joo, a divorced lawyer and the love of Dan-bi's life
- Ryu Sang-wook as Choi Kyu-won, president of the hospital company and Dan-bi's half-brother
- Shin Joo-ah as Han Won-mi, Dan-bi's step-sister who wants Kyu Won
- Kim Hae-in as Joo Sun-hee, Seung-joo's ex-wife and owner of a bar

Dan-bi's family

- Lee Young-ha as Han Man-joon, Dan-bi's adoptive father
- Jung Kyung-soon as Chun Soo-ryung, Man-joon's scheming wife and Dan-bi's second stepmother
- Geum Bo-ra as Oh Min-ah, Dan-bi's stepmother

Kyu-won's family

- Jung Ae-ri as Ryu Ji-sun, the doctor who is the birth mother of Dan-bi and Kyu-won
- Jeon Gook-hwan as Ryu Tae-sub, the founder of Pancea who is also Ji-sun's father and Dan-bi and Kyu-won's grandfather

Seung-joo's family

- Jo Yang-ja as Park Sun-ja, a restaurant owner and Seung-joo's mother
- Lee Gun as Seo Eun-suk, a photographer
- Choi Dae-sung as Jo Ki-dong, a nurse at Pancea
- Kim Ji-young as Lee Ha-ra, Seung-joo's daughter with Sun-hee
- Shim So-hun as Kim Eun-nim, Sun-ja's assistant at her restaurant

Extended cast

- Kim Da-rae as Kang Shin-young, Dan-bi's best friend
- Gook Jung-sook as Moon So-ran, Chairman Ryu's assistant
- Park Geun-rok as Mister Kim, the Hans' driver

== International broadcast ==
In addition to its telecasts in South Korea and Southeast Asia, the series was shown in Hawaii on KBFD/Honolulu, with most of the 30 minute episodes compressed into 90 minutes, complete with in-house subtitles.
