= Kim Ji-in =

South Korean actress (born 1996)

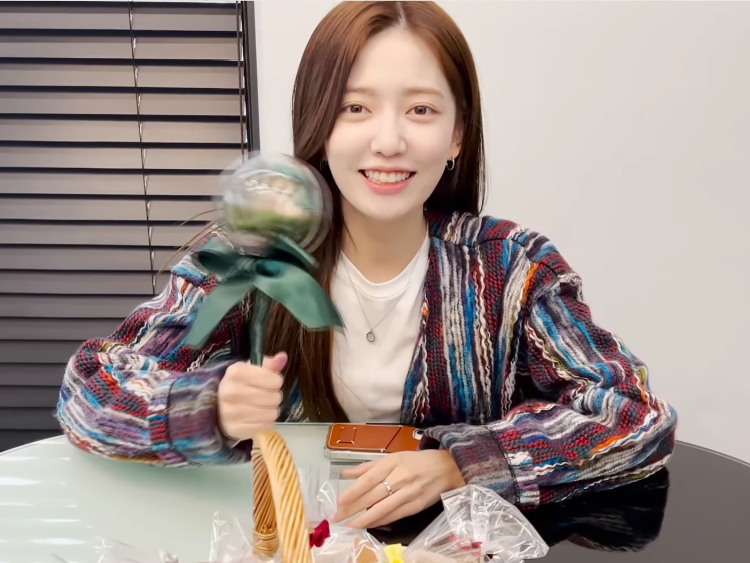
- Kim in 2022
- Born: 17 September 1996 (age 29); South Korea
- Occupations: Actress; model
- Years active: 2017–present
- Agent: VAST Entertainment

Korean name
- Hangul: 김지인
- RR: Gim Jiin
- MR: Kim Chiin

Kim Ji-in (Korean: 김지인; born 17 September 1996) is a South Korean actress. She is known for her roles in dramas Extraordinary You, So Not Worth It and Level Up.

== Filmography ==
=== Television series ===
Year	Title	Role	Ref.
2017	The Best Moment To Quit Your Job	Lee Min-seo	
2018	Just One Bite	Ha Eun-sung	
2018	Lady Cha Dal-rae's Lover	Tak Yi-ran	
2019	Just One Bite 2	Ha Eun-sung	
2019	How to Hate You	Oh Mi-ri	
2019	Level Up	Kim Sang-mi	
2019	Extraordinary You	Shin Sae-mi	
2020	Hyena	Tara	
2020	Memorist	Yoon Re-rim	
2020	Start-Up	Seo-hyun	
2021	So Not Worth It	Joo-ri	
2021	Idol: The Coup	So-yeon	
2022	O'PENing: "XX+XY"	Sera Lee	
2023	Not Others	Lee Na-gyun	
2024	Frankly Speaking	Choi Yoo-yeong	
