= Shim Hyung-tak =

South Korean actor

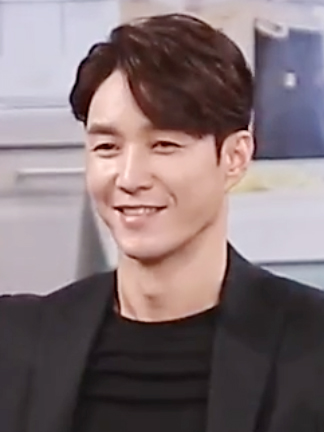
- Shim in 2017
- Born: January 12, 1978 (age 48); Seoul, South Korea
- Education: Sangji Youngseo College; University of Suwon
- Occupation: Actor
- Years active: 1998–present
- Agent: Humane Entertainment
- Spouse: Saya Hirai (m. 2023)
- Children: 1

Korean name
- Hangul: 심형탁
- Hanja: 沈亨倬
- RR: Sim Hyeongtak
- MR: Sim Hyŏngt'ak

Shim Hyung-tak (Korean: 심형탁, born January 12, 1978) is a South Korean actor. He starred in Korean dramas such as The Road Home (2009), Three Sisters (2010), Welcome Rain to My Life (2012), You Are the Boss! (2013), Let's Eat (2014), Miss Mamma Mia (2015), and Touch Your Heart (2019). He is famous for Doraemon Mania.

== Personal life ==
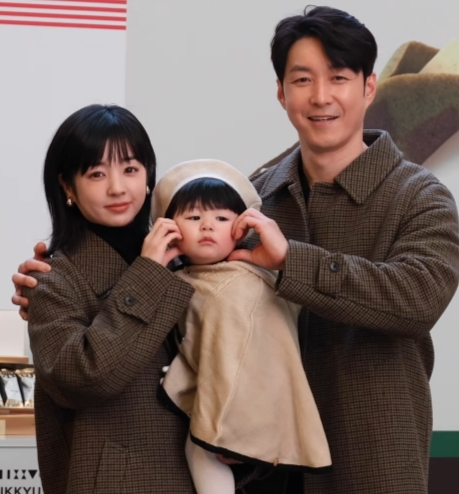
Shim's family in 2026

On April 3, 2023, Shim confirmed he would marry his girlfriend, Saya Hirai, who is 18 years younger than him, in July after dating for four years. They registered their marriage on June 5, 2023. On July 8, 2023, the couple held a private wedding ceremony near Mount Fuji in Japan.

On July 17, 2024, it was announced that Shim's wife was pregnant. Their first child, a son, was born on January 15, 2025.

== Filmography ==
Key
†	Denotes films that have not yet been released

=== Film ===
Year	Title	Role
2004	Doll Master	Tae-seong
2005	Love in Magic	(cameo)

=== Television series ===
Year	Title	Role
2002	Reservation for Love	Shin Jae-won
2002	To Be With You	Park Joon-ho
2002	Rustic Period	Jung Woon-kyung
2002	Lunch Lovers	Jung-hoo
2003	Drama City: "Terrible Love"	Lee Kyu
2003	Escape from Unemployment	Namgoong Hyuk
2004	Snow White: Taste Sweet Love	CEO Joo
2004	Drama City: "Storm"	Do-il
2007	Drama City: "Watch for the Angel!"	Oh Ryu
2007	Even So Love	Yoon Seok-bin
2008	The Secret of Coocoo Island	Shim Hyung-tak
2008	Love Is Delicious	Kim Jong-hyun
2009	The Road Home	Yoo Min-soo
2009	Hometown Legends – The Masked Ghost	Ah-saeng
2010	Master of Study	Jang Young-sik
2010	Three Sisters	Park Woo-chan
2011	I Trusted Him	Lee Sun-woo
2011	A Thousand Kisses	Park Tae-kyung
2011	Brain	Jo Dae-sik
2012	Welcome Rain to My Life	Lee Seung-joo
2012	Seoyoung, My Daughter	Choi Kyung-hoa
2013	Ad Genius Lee Tae-baek	Representative Ahn (cameo)
2013	You Are the Boss!	Lee Seon-nam
2013	Let's Eat	Kim Hak-moon
2014	Can We Fall in Love, Again?	Han Joon-mo
2014	KBS Drama Special: "Bomi's Room"	Kim Heung-sik
2014	High School King of Savvy	Jung Soo-young's friend (cameo, episode 16)
2014	Apgujeong Midnight Sun	Baek Young-joon
2015	Persevere, Gu Hae-ra	Tae-poong/Go Oh-hwan
2015	Miss Mamma Mia	Na Woo-jin/Kevin Edwards
2015	4 Legendary Witches	young Ma Tae-san (cameo)
2015	Divorce Lawyer in Love	Bong Min-gyu
2016	Five Enough	Lee Ho-tae
2016	Bring It On, Ghost	Professor (cameo)
2017	My Sassy Girl	Choon-poong/Prince Eun-sung
2017	Man in the Kitchen	Go Jung-do
2017	Children of the 20th Century	Terius/Jung Chang-hoon (cameo)
2018	Nice Witch	Chae Kang-min
2019	Touch Your Heart	Choi Yoon-hyuk
2019	Welcome to Waikiki 2	Gi-bong's senior (cameo, episodes 6-7)
2019	Melting Me Softly	Hwang Byeong-shim (old)
2021	Times	Han Do-kyung
2021	Undercover	Lee Min-yool (episodes 3-4)
2026	Reverse †	Detective Woo

=== Television shows ===
Year	Title	Notes
2009	My Daughter's Man	
2010	Star Golden Bell	
2010	Flower Bouquet	
2010	Let's Go! Dream Team	
2012	Star Love Village	Cast member
2015	Some Guys, Some Girls	Cast member
2015	Turn to the King	
2015	Law of the Jungle	Cast Member
2015	Mari and I	Cast Member
2015	Infinite Challenge	Episode 449-451
2016	Battle Trip	Contestant with Lee Jae-hoon, Episodes 2-3
2018	Omniscient Interfering View	Episodes 23-25
2018	My Money Partner : CEOs from Next Doors	Episodes 1-15
2020	Wannabe Ryan	Homeroom

=== Music video appearances ===
Year	Song title	Artist
2001	"You're Welcome"	As One
2005	"여기까진가요"	Flower
2005	"Goodbye My Love"	Lee Soo-young
2015	"Team Never Stop"	One Candle feat. Shim Hyung-tak
2020	"Shut Up & Squat" (닥치고 스쿼트)	Lee Seung-yoon

== Musical theatre ==
Year	Title	Role
2010–2011	Music in My Heart	Jang Jae-hyuk

== Awards and nominations ==
Year	Award	Category	Nominated work	Result
2015	9th Cable TV Broadcasting Awards	Star Award – Best Actor	Miss Mamma Mia	Won
2016	KBS Drama Awards	Best Male Artist Award in the Full-length Drama Part	Five Enough	Nominated
2019	27th Korean Culture and Entertainment Awards	Excellence Award, Actor in a Drama	Touch Your Heart	Won
2025	23rd KBS Entertainment Awards	Rookie Award (Reality)	The Return of Superman (with Shim Haru)	Won
