= Kang Byul =

South Korean actress (born 1990)

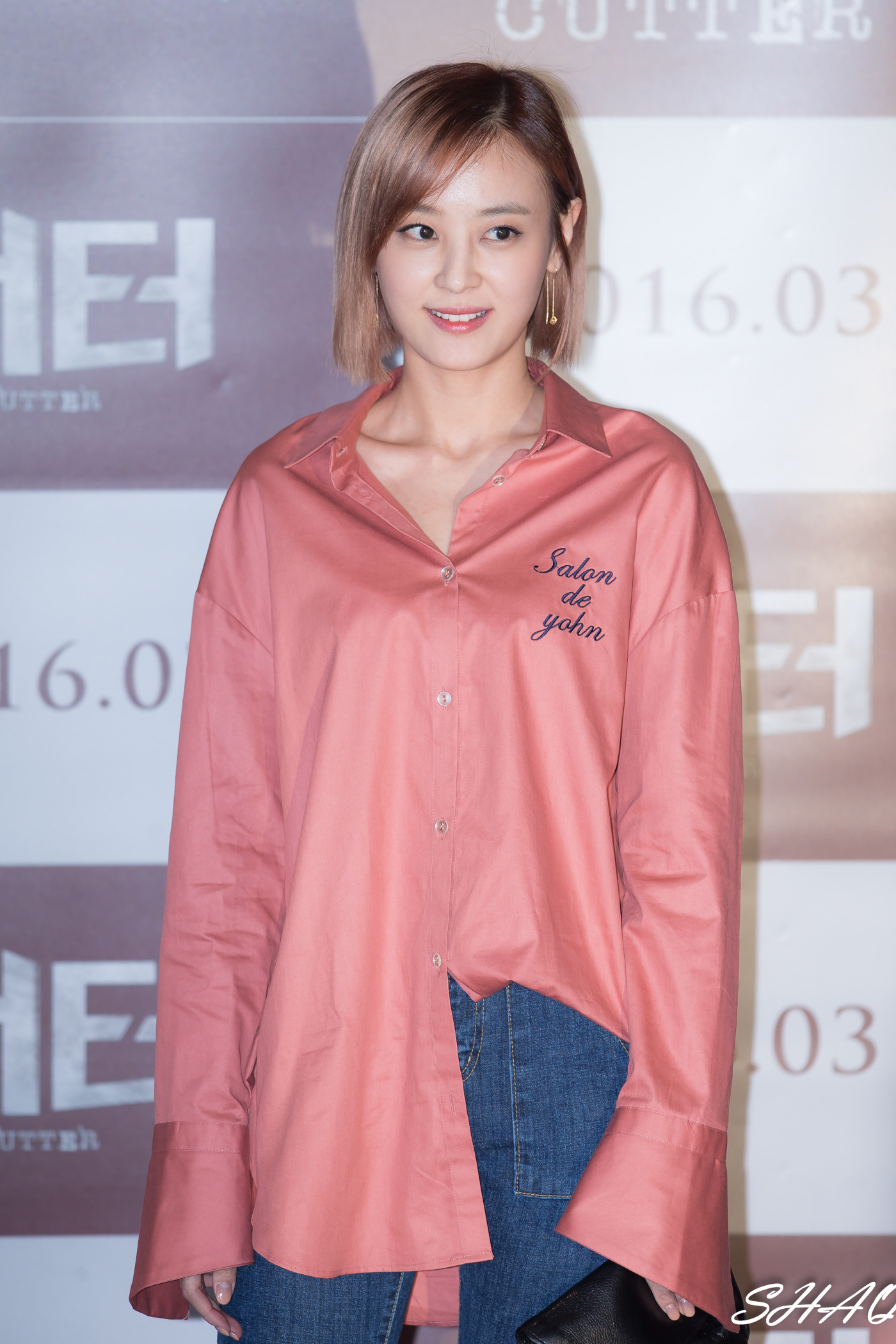
- Kang in March 2016
- Born: August 9, 1990 (age 36); Seoul, South Korea
- Education: Hanyang University - Theater and Film
- Occupation: Actress
- Years active: 2008–present
- Agent(s): Studio Santa Claus Entertainment (formerly Huayi Brothers Korea)
- Height: 168 cm (5 ft 6 in) (2017)

Korean name
- Hangul: 강별
- RR: Gang Byeol
- MR: Kang Pyŏl

Kang Byul (Korean: 강별, born August 9, 1990) is a South Korean actress. She made her acting debut in 2008 and was cast in her first leading role in the television drama Miss Mamma Mia (2015).

== Personal life ==
Her maternal uncle is actor Kang Sung-jin.

== Filmography ==
=== Television series ===
Year	Title	Role
2009	Creating Destiny	Han Hyo-eun
2010	Kim Su-ro, The Iron King	Ah-hyo/Ah-ni
2010	Golden House	Park Song-yi
2012	Rooftop Prince	Lady Mimi
2013	The Fugitive of Joseon	Choi Woo-young
2013	Ugly Alert	Gong Jin-joo
2014	God's Gift: 14 Days	Han Ki-tae's girlfriend (ep.6)
2015	Miss Mamma Mia	Seo Young-joo
2015	Save the Family	Lee Hae-soo
2016	Always Spring	Joo In-jeong
2019	Level Up	Bae Ya-che
2022	The Secret House	Nam Tae-hee
2024	Suji & Uri	Jin Na-young

=== Film ===
Year	Title	Role
2009	A Blood Pledge	Kang Bo-yoon
2011	Punch	Jeong Yun-ha
2012	Don't Click	Jung-mi
2015	Seoul Searching	Sue-Jin
2015	The File	Soo-gyeong
2021	3.5th period	

=== Variety show ===
Year	Title	Notes
2008	Jun Jin and 4 High School Girls	
2015	Star Golden Bell	

=== Music video appearance ===
Year	Song title	Artist
2012	"Made Another Girl Cry"	2BiC
