= Different Dreams =

2019 South Korean television series

- Promotional poster
- Hangul: 이몽
- RR: Imong
- MR: Imong
- Genre: Historical; Melodrama
- Developed by: Kim Seung-mo
- Written by: Jo Kyu-won
- Directed by: Yoon Sang-ho
- Starring: Lee Yo-won; Yoo Ji-tae; Lim Ju-hwan; Nam Gyu-ri
- Country of origin: South Korea
- Original language: Korean
- No. of episodes: 40 (Note: In order to circumvent Korean laws that prevent commercial breaks in the middle of an episode, what would previously have been aired as single 70 minute episodes are now being repackaged as two 35 minute episodes, with two episodes being shown each night with a commercial break between the two.)

Production
- Producer: Go Dae-hwa
- Running time: 35 minutes
- Production company: Imong Studio Culture Company (Note: The biggest investor in this company is KORTOP Media, the agency of Nam Gyu-ri.)

Original release
- Network: MBC TV
- Release: May 4 – July 13, 2019

Different Dreams (Korean: 이몽; RR: Imong) is a 2019 South Korean television series starring Lee Yo-won, Yoo Ji-tae, Lim Ju-hwan and Nam Gyu-ri. It aired four episodes every Saturday on MBC TV from 20:45 to 23:10 (KST), from May 4 to July 13, 2019.

The series celebrates the 100th anniversary of the March First Movement which led to the formation of the Provisional Government of the Republic of Korea in 1919.

== Synopsis ==
The story takes place in Gyeongseong (Seoul, Korea) and Shanghai (China) during the Japanese colonial rule of Korea. Lee Young-jin is a Korean surgeon who was raised by a Japanese family. She becomes a spy for the Korean government.

== Cast ==
=== Main ===
- Lee Yo-won as Lee Young-jin (36 years old)
- Yoo Ji-tae as Kim Won-bong (39 years old)
- Lim Ju-hwan as Fukuda (32 years old)
- Nam Gyu-ri as Miki (29 years old)

=== Supporting ===
==== People around Lee Young-jin ====
- Lee Hae-young as Hiroshi
- Lee Young-sook as Kim Hyun-ok
- Kim Tae-woo as Yoo Tae-joon
- Yoon Ji-hye as Esther

==== Heroic Corps ====
- Jo Bok-rae as Kim Nam-ok
- Baek Su-ho as Majar
- Park Ha-na as Cha Jeong-im
- Lee Kyu-ho as Yoon Se-ju
- Heo Ji-won as Park Hyeok
- Kim Joo-young as Kim Seung-jin

==== Joseon Governor Office ====
- Jeon Jin-ki as Oda
- Seol Jung-hwan as Ma Roo (Maru)
- Ahn Shin-woo as Kenta
- Yu Sang-jae as Roku

==== Jongno Police Station ====
- Heo Sung-tae as Matsuura
- Kang Pil-sun as Daiki
- Lee Kyo-yeob as Matsuda
- Yoon Joon-sung as Kimura
- Park Seon-woong as Taro

==== Joseon Governor Office Hospital ====
- Yoon Jong-hwa as Ishida
- Kim Kyu-jong as Seong Joon-soo

==== Cheongbang ====
- Kim Beob-rae as Do Wol-seong
- Jung Sung-il as Jin-soo
- Lee Sun-jin as Lee So-min

==== Others ====
- Sora Jung as Yu Madam
- Yoo Ha-bok as Kim Ku
- Kim Do-hyun as Murai
- Kim Sook-in as Macey
- Lee Han-wi as Song Byung-soo

== Production ==
- Lee Young-ae was supposed to portray Lee Young-jin but she withdrew from the television series due to schedule conflicts.
- The series is entirely pre-produced. Filming began in October 2018 and wrapped up on April 28, 2019.
- The drama also serves as a reunion project for both Lee Yo-won and Nam Gyu-ri who both starred in the 2011 hit drama 49 Days.

== Original soundtrack ==
Different Dreams OST

Soundtrack album by Various artists
- Released: 2019
- Genre: Soundtrack
- Languages: Korean; English
- Label: Danal Entertainment

=== Part 1 ===
Released on May 4, 2019
No.	Title	Artist	Length
1.	"Same But Different Dreams" (같지만 다른 꿈)	OLIVER	4:31
2.	"Same But Different Dreams" (Inst.)		4:31
Total length:			9:02

=== Part 2 ===
Released on May 11, 2019
No.	Title	Artist	Length
1.	"Candle in the Rain"	Nam Gyu-ri	4:50
2.	"Candle in the Rain" (Inst.)		4:50
Total length:			9:40

=== Part 3 ===
Released on May 18, 2019
No.	Title	Artist	Length
1.	"I Miss You"	Taesabiae	4:26
2.	"I Miss You" (Inst.)		4:26
Total length:			8:52

=== Part 4 ===
Released on May 25, 2019
No.	Title	Artist	Length
1.	"Crossing"	R.B	3:54
2.	"Crossing" (MR)		3:54
Total length:			7:48

=== Part 5 ===
Released on June 1, 2019
No.	Title	Artist	Length
1.	"Before Tonight is Over" (이밤이 다하기 전에)	Nam Gyu-ri	4:12
2.	"Before Tonight is Over" (Inst.)		4:12
Total length:			8:24

=== Part 6 ===
Released on June 8, 2019
No.	Title	Artist	Length
1.	"Goodbye"	Ladies	4:15
2.	"Goodbye" (Inst.)		4:15
Total length:			8:30

=== Part 7 ===
Released on June 15, 2019
No.	Title	Artist	Length
1.	"Dawn" (여명)	Han Dam-hee	4:27
2.	"Dawn" (Inst.)		4:27
Total length:			8:54

=== Part 8 ===
Released on June 22, 2019
No.	Title	Artist	Length
1.	"Because You're My Everything" (전부이니까)	Ahin (Momoland)	3:41
2.	"Because You're My Everything" (Inst.)		3:41
Total length:			7:22

=== Part 9 ===
Released on June 29, 2019
No.	Title	Artist	Length
1.	"Let Me Know"	Rich	3:47
2.	"Let Me Know" (Inst.)		3:47
Total length:			7:34

=== Part 11 ===
Released on July 14, 2019
No.	Title	Artist	Length
1.	"I Want You" (원하고 원하면)	Kim Dong-han	3:57
2.	"I Want You" (Inst.)		3:57
3.	"Dance Tonight"	Nam Gyu-ri	3:00
4.	"Dance Tonight" (Inst.)		3:00
Total length:			13:54

== Ratings ==
- In this table, the blue numbers represent the lowest ratings and the red numbers represent the highest ratings.
- NR denotes that the drama did not rank in the top 20 daily programs on that date.
- N/A denotes that the rating is not known.

Ep.	Original broadcast date	Average audience share		
Ep.	Original broadcast date	AGB Nielsen		TNmS
Ep.	Original broadcast date	Nationwide	Seoul	Nationwide
1	May 4, 2019	5.0% (NR)	—N/a	6.8%
2	May 4, 2019	7.1% (8th)	7.0% (9th)	8.2%
3	May 4, 2019	5.9% (14th)	5.7% (15th)	6.3%
4	May 4, 2019	6.5% (10th)	6.3% (12th)	6.3%
5	May 11, 2019	5.5% (NR)	6.2% (15th)	—N/a
6	May 11, 2019	6.4% (11th)	6.5% (14th)	6.6%
7	May 11, 2019	5.7% (NR)	5.5% (NR)	6.0%
8	May 11, 2019	6.1% (16th)	6.2% (15th)	—N/a
9	May 18, 2019	4.7% (NR)	—N/a	—N/a
10	May 18, 2019	5.8% (20th)	5.9% (16th)	6.5%
11	May 18, 2019	5.1% (NR)	—N/a	—N/a
12	May 18, 2019	5.2% (NR)	5.3% (20th)	—N/a
13	May 25, 2019 (Note: Only two episodes were aired due to the broadcast of the 2019 FIFA U-20 World Cup Group F match between South Korea and Portugal.)	4.9% (NR)	—N/a	—N/a
14	May 25, 2019	5.8% (16th)	5.3% (16th)	5.8%
15	June 1, 2019	3.9% (NR)	—N/a	
16	June 1, 2019	5.1% (NR)	5.2% (20th)	5.9%
17	June 1, 2019	4.5% (NR)	—N/a	—N/a
18	June 1, 2019	5.0% (NR)	—N/a	—N/a
19	June 8, 2019	4.7% (NR)	—N/a	—N/a
20	June 8, 2019	5.1% (NR)	—N/a	5.2%
21	June 8, 2019	4.8% (NR)	—N/a	—N/a
22	June 8, 2019	5.5% (19th)	5.8% (13th)	5.4%
23	June 15, 2019	3.3% (NR)	—N/a	
24	June 15, 2019	3.9% (NR)	—N/a	
25	June 15, 2019	4.0% (NR)	—N/a	
26	June 15, 2019	4.5% (NR)	—N/a	
27	June 22, 2019	3.0% (NR)	—N/a	
28	June 22, 2019	4.5% (NR)	—N/a	
29	June 22, 2019	4.2% (NR)	—N/a	
30	June 22, 2019	5.1% (20th)	—N/a	
31	June 29, 2019	2.9% (NR)	—N/a	
32	June 29, 2019	3.9% (NR)	—N/a	
33	June 29, 2019	4.5% (NR)	—N/a	
34	June 29, 2019	5.0% (NR)	—N/a	
35	July 6, 2019	2.2% (NR)	—N/a	
36	July 6, 2019	3.8% (NR)	—N/a	
37	July 6, 2019	4.1% (NR)	—N/a	
38	July 6, 2019	4.8% (NR)	—N/a	
39	July 13, 2019	3.0% (NR)	—N/a	
40	July 13, 2019	4.3% (NR)	—N/a	
Average		4.7%	— (Note: Due to some ratings not recorded, the exact average rating is unknown.)	
