= We Got Married season 1 =

South Korean television series season

WGM Season 1 Logo

We Got Married (Korean: 우리 결혼했어요) is a popular reality South Korean variety show and a segment of the Sunday Sunday Night program. First broadcast in 2008, the show pairs up Korean celebrities to show what life would be like if they were married. Each week, couples are assigned missions to complete, with candid interviews of the participants to reveal their thoughts and feelings.

With a new format and slightly different couples, newlyweds are given a mission to complete each week. As during the special pilot episode, interviewed participants provide a unique perspective on the ongoing relationship conflicts and developments. All of the recorded material is then played in front of the participants, MCs, and audience who add commentary or clarification.

Beginning with a Lunar New Year's Special in 2009 with three new couples, a new format is introduced into the show, first forecasted through the addition of Kangin and Lee Yoon Ji. Each couple is given a concept to portray; in Kangin and Lee Yoon Ji's case, a college couple living with a limited income. The show now consists of more special effects and editing in order to show each couple in a set atmosphere and theme.

== Original couples ==
- Alex & Shin Ae (Ep 1-8, 13-34) →(total: 7 months)
- Crown J & Seo In Young (Ep 1-41) →(total: 10 months)
- Andy & Solbi (Ep 1-28) →(total: 7 months)
- Jung Hyung Don & Saori (Ep 1-8) →(total: 2 months)

== Additional couples ==
- Lee Hwi-jae & Jo Yeo-jeong (Ep 9-17) →(total: 2 months)
- Kim Hyun-joong & Hwangbo (Ep 9-38) →(total: 7 months)
- Hwanhee & Hwayobi (Ep 25, 29-44) →(total: 5 months)
- Marco & Son Dam-bi (Ep 25, 29-44) →(total: 5 months)
- Choi Jin-young & Lee Hyun-ji (Ep 25)
- Kangin & Lee Yoon-ji (Ep 39-55) →(total: 5 months)
- Jung Hyung-don & Kim Taeyeon (Ep 42-54) →(total: 3 months)
- Shin Sung-rok & Kim Shin-young (Ep 42, 45-54) →(total: 3 months)
- Jun Jin & Lee Si-young (Ep 42, 45-55) →(total: 4 months)

== Season I Episode summaries ==
Ep	Date aired	Summary
1	16 March 2008	All newlyweds are to "Move into new house" on White Day, 14 March. While the couples prepare their new houses together, two of the grooms (Crown J & Andy) prepare surprises for this special day.
2	23 March 2008	The continuation of last week's mission. Hyung Don tries to make 'Star' surprise for Saori but the result doesn't come out as he wished. Alex sings "Like a Child" for Shinae after preparing several romantic events.
3	30 March 2008	On the next day, each couple wakes up and prepare breakfast. After 10 days, they are then given a new mission: "Today is the day to exercise together with your partner". Andy and Solbi play pool, Crown J and In Young 'finger' exercise, Alex and Shinae boxing, and Hyung Don and Saori go in-line skating.
4	6 April 2008	The continuation of last week's mission. While each couple enjoy doing exercises together, Hyung Don and Saori couple get into another conflict. The conflict brings up an argument between people in the recording studio.
5	13 April 2008	The next mission for each couple is "Spring Kimchi making". Alex and Shinae are assigned to make 'Oisobaegi' (cucumber kimchi). Hyung Don and Saori make 'Kakdoogi' kimchi together, their relationship getting better since through this.
6	20 April 2008	While eating Kimchi together, Andy calls up Eric and lets Solbi talk to him, knowing she had admired him long before. On another side, Crown J surprises In Young with new shoes he bought from Atlanta. We cut to a week later, and another new mission is given, "Making a love lunch box". Alex and Shin Ae prepare the lunch box together and go out for picnic. Hyung Don and Saori have a quarrel yet again, but nonetheless they still go out for a picnic with their lunch boxes and fly kites in the windy weather.
7	27 April 2008	Continuation of last week's mission. Crown J makes rice balls and decides to take In Young to a baseball match. Solbi prepares Kimbab with the help of her mother. She takes the lunch boxes and goes to visit Andy and Shinhwa at their 10th anniversary concert. While eating lunch, Andy and Solbi accidentally share their first kiss.
8	4 May 2008	The baseball game is cancelled because of bad weather and because of this, Crown J inevitably has another fight with In Young. Andy does a 'love' sign for Solbi on stage while performing at Shinhwa's 10th anniversary concert. Hyung Don keeps copying other couples actions from previous episodes and this leads to disappointment for Saori. Alex brings Shin Ae to his recording studio and sings her a song. He then tells her that he has to leave the show for a while because of his upcoming first solo album release.
9	11 May 2008	Saori doesn't appear in the episode, instead, she has left a message to Hyung Don, revealing they had decided to go for a 'divorce'. A new mission was given, "The Parents' Day. Buy gifts for your parents". After buying the gifts, Andy prepares an impressive banquet for Solbi's parents who come to their house later. Crown J prepares another big surprise for In Young by singing "Too Much". Two new couples appear at the end of episode. Hyun Joong and Hwangbo go for their honeymoon in Jeju Island, while the Hwi Jae and Yeo Jeong couple set up their new house.
10	18 May 2008	While having dinner, Hyun Joong continues to mispronounce 'ssangchu' (lettuce), much to Hwangbo's amusement, and since then, they have been dubbed by the hosts as the 'Lettuce' couple. During the first night together, the two new couples make marriage contracts. On another side, Andy meets Solbi's parents and they have dinner together. Afterward, he surprises Solbi with a ring. Crown J and In Young go to sauna together with Crown J's mother, who has just come back from overseas.
11	25 May 2008	The episode starts with Hyun Joong and Hwangbo moving into their new house. Another mission is given, "Today is the housewarming day". Each couple prepare food and invite people for their housewarming. Special guests' appearance for housewarming including: Andy & Solbi: Jung Hyung Don; Crown J & In Young: Lee Hyuk Jae, Sung Soo, and Ji Sang Ryul; Hwi Jae & Yeo Jeong: Ock Ju Hyun and Park Ye Jin, and Shin Bong-sun; Hyun Joong & Hwangbo: SS501 - Kim Kyu Jong, Heo Young Saeng, Kim Hyung Joon, Song Eun Ee, Choi Hwa-jung, and Park Shi Eun.
12	1 June 2008	The continuation of last week's mission. At the end of episode, Solbi confesses in the blackroom that she lost the ring which was given to her by Andy in the previous episode. Additional special guests' appearance for housewarming include: Hyun Joong & Hwangbo SS501 members (except Park Jung-min); Hwi Jae & Yeo Jeong: Lee Hoon, Kim Hyeon-chul, and Shin Bong-sun; Andy & Solbi: Chae Yeon, Kim Won-hee, So Yoo-jin, and Kang Soo-jung; Crown J & In Young: Go Young-wook
13	8 June 2008	Crown J and In Young receive another guest (Ji Sang Ryul) at the end of housewarming day and In Young, already exhausted and frustrated from the day, becomes more angry. One week later, each couple go on the next mission which is "Spending the day off together". Both Hyunjoong & Hwangbo and Crown J & In Young couples go to a water theme park. Meanwhile, Alex and Shin Ae reunite after being parted for 7 weeks.
14	15 June 2008	While spending the day at a shopping mall, Hwi Jae suddenly disappears, causing Yeo Jeong to become worried. Solbi and Andy spend the day at the theme park while they were trying to solve their conflict. After having a reunion, Alex and Shin Ae appear as awkward as their first meeting, going to Namsan Tower for love padlocks. Coincidentally, Crown J and In Young bumps into Hyunjoong and Hwangbo at the theme park, both couples appearing to have gone to the same place.
15	22 June 2008	After spending the day at the theme park, Solbi tearfully confesses to Andy that she lost the ring. Hwi Jae goes to Jamsil Baseball Stadium (Doosan vs Kia match) to see Yeo Jeong throwing the opening pitch that he had taught her before. Hyun Joong did not attend the recording studio for this episode because of his trip to Japan.
16	29 June 2008	Hyunjoong & Hwangbo and Hwi Jae & Yeo Jeong couples are given a mission, "Make a memory". Hyun Joong and Hwangbo move into a new house. Hwi Jae and Yeo Jeong go to Nami Island (famous for being the shooting place for Winter Sonata). The other three couples celebrate their 100th day wedding anniversary with a wedding photoshoot. They visit the beauty salon and wedding dress shop to prepare.
17	6 July 2008	The continuation of last week's missions. In order to make a memory, Hwi Jae gives Yeo Jeong a love-matching necklace. Hyun Joong presents to Hwangbo a paper crane, claiming he promises to make her one thousand to seal their love. He then sings Falling Slowly for her, and at the end a recorded video message by Hyun Joong is played in the studio. The other three couples have their 100th wedding day photoshoot.
18	13 July 2008	The next mission is "Taking care of your wife/husband". Andy and Solbi couple go to the fish market, While Crown J and In Young visit the hospital to have a medical check up. Alex brings a lunch box and makes a surprise visit to Shin Ae while she has her magazine photo shoot, but he himself is surprised at how different she is at work. On another side, Hwangbo surprises Hyun Joong by traveling to Japan and visiting SS501's dorm.
19	20 July 2008	The next morning in Japan, Hwangbo prepares breakfast for the members of SS501, and Hyun Joong then takes her to the recording studio. After having the medical check-up, Crown J takes In Young to Dongdaemun Market and gives her a hairband as a present. Meanwhile, Andy and Solbi exchange the couple rings that they both coincidentally bought. Shin Ae goes to the MBC radio station to see Alex working live as a DJ.
20	27 July 2008	The next mission given is "Go on a vacation with couples". Andy, Solbi, Crown J and In Young are asked to be at the Chung Ryung Ri Train Station at 9am. They are to spend a one night vacation at Ga Pyong, Gyeonggi Province and Jung Hyung Don is invited to come along. Hyunjoong, Hwangbo, Alex and Shinae have a vacation together at Haeundae Beach, Busan.
21	3 August 2008	The continuation of last week's mission. Hwangbo and Shin Ae play a trick on their husbands by acting as if they were having a fight to see their reaction. The other pair of couples have a barbecue together with Hyung Don.
22	24 August 2008	Hyun Joong and Hwangbo celebrate their "100th Day Wedding Anniversary" with a photoshoot, and Shin Ae-ra makes a special guest appearance as Hwangbo's helper. The other three couples get a mission to "Return to daily life after the vacation". Andy meets Solbi's sister for the first time, and the family celebrate Solbi's mother's belated birthday. Alex and Shin Ae have a carwash and play Go Stop, while Crown J and In Young get ready for a TV performance.
23	31 August 2008	Taking off from last week's episode, Alex and Shin Ae resume their leisure home vacation by planting vegetables in their garden and baking cookies. Crown J helps promote In Young's album by giving them as gifts to fellow artists. Among their special guests were Nam Gyu-Ri, Kara, and T.O.P and Tae Yang of Big Bang. Hyun Joong and Hwangbo continue their photoshoot, with Baek Bo Ram visiting briefly as another of Hwangbo's friends. Alex makes an appearance at Solbi's mother's birthday, and this irritates Solbi's father, causing Andy to jump in to help.
24	7 September 2008	Crown J & In Young and Alex & Shinae couples are assigned with the mission, "To take care of babies as a married couple". While Crown J and In Young are to take care of a baby girl, Alex and Shinae are given quadruplets to look after. The other couples get a different mission, "Experiencing the farms as a couple". Hyun Joong and Hwangbo go to a village and run errands for an elderly woman. Andy and Solbi, however, go to a farm and help feed the cattle and other hard chores.
25	14 September 2008	Chuseok Special. The new couples are introduced and given a mission, "The married couple to spend the first day together". They move into their new homes, go shopping and spend the night together at their house. In the second part, the original couples participate in several couple games such as wrestling, duo musical performances and peppero game. Deleted scenes from the past episodes are shown for the first time.
26	21 September 2008	The continuation of Ep 24's mission. Alex, Shinae, Crown J and In Young continue to take care of their respective babies. Crown J and In Young have yet another fight over a bowl of ramen with egg. When the parents come to collect the children, Shin Ae gives the babies each a pair of shoes from her collection. Andy and Solbi find time together while doing the chores, while Hyun Joong and Hwang Bo go fishing. In the end of episode, Hyun Joong prepares a romantic surprise for Hwangbo for her belated birthday, with a serenade and the one thousand origami cranes he promised.
27	28 September 2008	A new mission is given, "Farewell Journey for couple... To do whatever you want to do together for the last time". Hwangbo and Hyun Joong change their farewell mission into a mini Olympic tournament with the loser giving the winner a cheek kiss, piggyback ride and dinner. Shin Ae goes to Alex's concert and bakes him a cake for his birthday. Crown J and In Young go rollerblading. Andy and Solbi go to Namsan Tower and write messages on locks for each other.
28	5 October 2008	The continuation of last week's mission. Crown J prepares a romantic surprise for In Young's birthday. Hyun Joong and Hwangbo return home where Hwangbo must complete the remaining two missions through losing the tournament; dinner and the kiss. Shin Ae stays behind after Alex's concert and he performs a song just for her. Andy and Solbi play pool and take a stroll to the park. In the end, the couples chose whether to say "I love you" or "I'm sorry" to stay or leave. Andy and Solbi officially announce their leaving from the show.
29	12 October 2008	Crown J & In Young couple leads Hyunjoong, Hwangbo and the two new couples (Hwanhee & Hwayobi and Marco & Dambi) on an "Ant Tour" to the Anmyeon-do at Taean, South Chungcheong Province. Meanwhile, Alex and Shin Ae are left to take care of the quadruplets again, but when Shin Ae has to leave for work, Alex calls on Eunhyuk and Leeteuk of Super Junior to help.
30	19 October 2008	Continuation of last week's episode. The couples on the Ant Tour play paintball and couple activities at a spa. Crown J and In Young stage a fight to see the new couple's reactions. Alex visits Shin Ae with the babies at her photoshoot with Son Ho Young.
31	26 October 2008	Hyunjoong and Hwangbo couple visit an amusement park and enjoy themselves]. Marco and Dam Bi go shopping for books for Marco's Korean lesson, but fight. Alex surprises Shin Ae at her fanmeeting. Crown J and In Young move into a bigger house, but find out Jung Hyung Don is their new housemate. Hwayobi puts couple pictures around the house while Hwanhee is out, and they purchase a new sofa together.
32	2 November 2008	Crown J and In Young's new home turns into chaos with Hyung Don's arrival. Hwayobi cooks dinner at home while Hwanhee watches her old videos. Hwangbo and Hyun Joong decide to set up a blind date between Kyu Jong and Hyung Joon from SS501 with Ye Eun and Yoo Bin from Wonder Girls. Still with the tension after the shopping, three of Marco's friends arrive unexpectedly at the Marbi household. Alex takes Shinae to the observatory at Yangju.
33	9 November 2008	Crown J, In Young and Hyung Don get a mission, "Spend the day off with the family". Another mission is given to Hwanhee, "In your own way, plan a honeymoon that would make Hwayobi happy". Hyun Joong and Hwang Bo continue with the blind date for the brothers-in-law. Marco and Dam Bi get another mission which is "Find each other's weaknesses". Alex and Shin Ae's last mission is "To give thanks to the fans on the last day as a married couple".
34	16 November 2008	Hyun Joong and Hwang Bo get a mission envelope with a blank paper. So, they write the mission by themselves: "Hyun Joong becomes Buin's manager for a day while taking care of her pet dog, Jins". Hwayobi surprises Hwanhee in the wilderness campsite with a romantic event and a serenade. Marco takes Dam Bi to a club. In the end of episode, Alex and Shin Ae confirm their departure from the show.
35	23 November 2008	The continuation of last week's mission for Hyun Joong and Hwang Bo. A new mission is given to Hwayobi, "Pick out a house that the husband will like" and she decides on a traditional Korean house. Due to various complaints from viewers for his attitude and behavior, Marco prepares a romantic date for Dambi, Argentinean style in order to prevent a "forced farewell". Crown J, In Young and Hyung Don are given a mission, "Make kimjang and think about the meaning of family".
36	30 November 2008	Hyun Joong and Hwang Bo get a new mission, "Prepare together for winter" and they go iceskating. Hwayobi and Hwanhee finally settle down in their new house and have dinner with meal cooked by Hwayobi after buying the raw food from local market. While making kimjang, In Young surprises Crown J for his birthday with Hyung Don's help. MarBi couple's date continues with a series of romantic events including a serenade of Eres Tu from Marco.
37	7 December 2008	Hyun Joong and Hwang Bo go to Jeju Island for their "Farewell Vacation". A surprise guest appears at Crown J and In Young's house in plans "to matchmake Hyung Don up" so he would leave. The two new couples have their 100th day anniversary wedding photoshoot.
38	14 December 2008	The continuation of last week's episode. Hwayobi and Hwanhee are assigned "Write a couple song". Dam Bi's mission "Kiss Marco by midnight" ends with embarrassing results for both sides. Crown J, In Young and Hyung Don, along with the fan, go to a ceramics class. After hiking up Hallasan, Hyun Joong and Hwang Bo bid their farewell to each other.
39	21 December 2008	A new couple, Kangin and Yoon Ji meet each other for the first time in the library at JoongAhng University. Crown J, In Young and Hyung Don get a new mission, "Plan an end-of the year event and a Christmas party with your family". They end up holding the party in the midday as In Young has an event to attend at night. After listening to voice message, Hwanhee & Hwayobi get another mission, "Make a photo tree of a year-memories and prepare for the end of the year". Marco & Dambi go to the ski resort in Kangwondo to improve their bond as a true married couple.
40	28 December 2008	Kangin & Yoonji moves into a new house and were given some allowances to set up the new house. Marco & Dambi goes to see sunrise at the ski resort by riding a gondola. After completing the mission, Hwanhee & Hwayobi spend together in their house's sauna. Hwanhee prepares a surprise for Hwayobi as the last gift for her in 2008. Crown J, In Young and Hyung Don go to the bar to celebrate the end of year.
41	18 January 2009	The continuation of last week mission for Kangin & Yoonji. Marco & Dambi get a new mission, "Execute a unique 2009 project" and Dam Bi decides a swimming in winter ocean for Marco. Hwanhee and Hwayobi were given another mission, "Sing a song together in any concert" and they decide to perform together in FTTS's concert. Seo In Young and Crown J were given the last mission, "Break up coolly" and they prepare the farewell separately for each other. In the end of episode, they officially announced their departure from the show.
42	25 January 2009	2009 Lunar New Year Special which features three new couples. Sung Rok and Shin Young meet at the basketball court. Jun Jin meets Si Young in church. Hyung Don goes to SNSD's dorm to find out who's his bride.
43	1 February 2009	Kangin & Yoonji give rice cakes to their neighbours. Marco joins winter sea swimming competition without Dambi accompany him. He won cinema tickets as the third place but the tickets cannot be used in Seoul. Hwanhee and Hwayobi make a house guest party with Gong Hyung-jin and Yang Hee-jong as their guests. HyungDon and Tae Yeon were given a mission, "Make a final decision on whether to start a marriage life or not by having a date". They go to see a fortuneteller and then, go to a trout festival.
44	8 February 2009	Hwanhee and Hwayobi create their last mission for farewell and they meet with Hwayobi's friends (Young ji, Gummy, and Lynn). Marco & Dambi also leave the show by celebrating the Valentine's Day together. Dambi surprises Marco by dancing (together with After School members) for their farewell. A mission was given toKangin & Yoonji, "Express each other's sincerity". Hyungdon and Taeyeon meet Lee Wae Soo (novelist) and his wife. They decide to stay together as a married couple.
45	15 February 2009	Yoon Ji visits Kang In and Super Junior-Happy in Japan, and then both of them ride a ferris wheel. Sung Rok comes to Shin Young's house and they start decorating the house together. Junjin and Si Young were given a mission, "Have a wedding gift exchange and leave for honeymoon". Hyungdon and Taeyeon receive another mission, "Make a special day to commemorate marriage" and they decide to have a wedding photoshoot.
46	22 February 2009	Yoon Ji visits Kang In continue their second day of honeymoon in Japan. After having the photoshoot, Hyungdon and Taeyeon walk together in the park and exchange chocolates to each other for the Valentine's Day. The other two couples are not featured in this episode.
47	1 March 2009	Sung Rok and Shin Young having their housewarming party. Later, Sung Rok sends Shin Young to MBC radio station. Junjin and Si Young continue their honeymoon but they end up into quarrel. Hyungdon and Taeyeon have a fake wedding ceremony organized by SNSD's members. Each couple were given a mission, "WGM couple strengthening rally".
48	15 March 2009	The continuation of last week's mission. All four couples meet up for the rally. They compete with each other and play games. After that, they go to Shin Young's house to have karaoke and dinner together.
49	22 March 2009	Kangin & Yoonji plan to make a housewarming party and they invite Park Hyun Bin as one of their guests. Sung Rok helps Shin Young for her driving test. Junjin and Si Young receive a mission, "Start a hobby that both can enjoy" and they decide to play snooker. Hyung Don becomes a manager for SNSD while they were having a concert in Thailand.
50	29 March 2009	Super Junior members and Jay from The TRAX visit Kangin & Yoonji with housewarming gifts. Junjin and Si Young design their own couple shirt by handprinting. After much practice, Shin Young passes her driving test. Hyungdon and Taeyeon move into a new house and they were given a mission, "Evaluate each other as a husband and wife".
51	5 April 2009	Kangin & Yoonji move into another apartment, Yuhki Kuramoto makes a guest appearance and performs for Yoonji's belated birthday. Junjin and Si Young engage in a psychological battle as they are given the mission "Smile no matter what to prove you can be a harmonious couple". Sung Rok becomes a guest for Shinyoung's radio live show. Later, Shinyoung watches Sung Rok's musical theatre. Hyungdon and Taeyeon go bungee jumping but Hyung Don refused to do it because of acrophobia.
52	12 April 2009	Kangin and Yoonji both get a shock when they each invite one of their respective parents without the other knowing. Junjin and Si Young go to the amusement park. The next day, Junjin visits Si Young during the filming of her movie, and they have a meal with the director. Shin Young and Sung Rok go to sauna and have a serious talk there. Later, both of them visit Hyung Don and Tae Yeon 's house after they having their housewarming with SNSD and Oh Sang In.
53	19 April 2009	New mission was given to each couple, "Make good memories together for Spring Vacation". Sung Rok and Shinyoung go to amusement park. Junjin and Si Young go to Junjin's place to practice dancing. Kangin, Yoonji, Hyungdon and Taeyeon have their vacation in Dori Island.
54	26 April 2009	The continuation of last week's mission. Si Young makes Jun Jin a lunch box and visit him while he's having a recording for Infinity Challenge. Tae Yeon prepares dinner for Hyung Don for the last time. They exchange testimonial for each other before farewell. Sung Rok and Shinyoung also spend their time together before having their farewell in the end of episode.
55	3 May 2009	Kangin & Yoonji and Junjin & Siyoung couples prepare for their farewell. The composer of Jun Jin's new album asks Si Young to sing a part in a song. Being the last time together with mission "Last day of Marriage", Kangin takes Yoonji out for a magnificent outing, and they try on wedding clothes in a bridal shop. Later that night, they go for a walk along the Han River.
