= 2020 MBC Drama Awards =

39th edition of award ceremony

- Title card
- Date: December 30, 2020
- Site: MBC Media Center Public Hall, Sangam-dong, Mapo-gu, Seoul
- Hosted by: Kim Sung-joo
- Official website: 2020 MBC Drama Awards

Highlights
- Best Drama Serial: Kkondae Intern
- Grand Prize (Daesang): Park Hae-jin

Television coverage
- Network: MBC

The 2020 MBC Drama Awards, presented by Munhwa Broadcasting Corporation (MBC). It was hosted by Kim Sung-joo. It aired on December 30, 2020 at 21:00 (KST).

== Winners and nominees ==
- Winners denoted in **bold**

Grand Prize (Daesang)	Drama of the Year
**Park Hae-jin** – Kkondae Intern	**Kkondae Intern**; Find Me in Your Memory; 365: Repeat the Year; Kairos; The Spies Who Loved Me; Dinner Mate; When I Was Most Beautiful
Top Excellence Award, Actor in a Monday-Tuesday Miniseries / Short Drama	Top Excellence Award, Actress in a Monday-Tuesday Miniseries / Short Drama
**Shin Sung-rok** – Kairos; Jo Han-sun – She Knows Everything; Song Seung-heon – Dinner Mate	**Nam Ji-hyun** – 365: Repeat the Year; Kang Sung-yeon – She Knows Everything; Lee Se-young – Kairos; Oh Na-ra – Chip In; Seo Ji-hye – Dinner Mate
Top Excellence Award, Actor in a Wednesday-Thursday Miniseries	Top Excellence Award, Actress in a Wednesday-Thursday Miniseries
**Kim Eung-soo** – Kkondae Intern; Eric Mun – The Spies Who Loved Me; Ji Soo – When I Was Most Beautiful; Kim Dong-wook – Find Me in Your Memory; Ok Taec-yeon – The Game: Towards Zero; Park Hae-jin – Kkondae Intern	**Im Soo-hyang** – When I Was Most Beautiful; Lee Yeon-hee – The Game: Towards Zero; Moon Ka-young – Find Me in Your Memory; Yoo In-na – The Spies Who Loved Me
Excellence Award, Actor in a Monday-Tuesday Miniseries / Short Drama	Excellence Award, Actress in a Monday-Tuesday Miniseries / Short Drama
**Lee Joon-hyuk** – 365: Repeat the Year; Ahn Bo-hyun – Kairos; Lee Ji-hoon – Dinner Mate; Yang Dong-geun – 365: Repeat the Year	**Nam Gyu-ri** – Kairos; Kim Hye-jun – Chip In; Kim Ji-soo – 365: Repeat the Year; Kim Gyu-seon – She Knows Everything
Excellence Award, Actor in a Wednesday-Thursday Miniseries	Excellence Award, Actress in a Wednesday-Thursday Miniseries
**Lim Ju-hwan** – The Game: Towards Zero, The Spies Who Loved Me; Ha Seok-jin – When I Was Most Beautiful; Park Ki-woong – Kkondae Intern; Yoon Jong-hoon – Find Me in Your Memory	**Kim Seul-gi** – Find Me in Your Memory; Han Ji-eun – Kkondae Intern; Hwang Seung-eon – When I Was Most Beautiful
Best Supporting Actor	Best Supporting Actress
**Lee Sung-wook** – 365: Repeat the Year; Choi Jong-hwan – When I Was Most Beautiful; Ko Kyu-pil – Kairos; Joo Seok-tae – Find Me in Your Memory; Kim Tae-woo – The Spies Who Loved Me; Nam Moon-chul – Chip In	**Kim Sun-young** – Kkondae Intern; Jang Young-nam – Find Me in Your Memory; Hwang Jung-min – Kairos; Park Ji-young – When I Was Most Beautiful; Cha Joo-young – The Spies Who Loved Me
Best New Actor	Best New Actress
**Ahn Bo-hyun** – Kairos; Kang Seung-yoon – Kairos; Lee Jin-hyuk – Find Me in Your Memory; Bae In-hyuk – The Spies Who Loved Me; Kim Do-wan – She Knows Everything; Noh Jong-hyun – Kkondae Intern; Choi Kyu-jin – Chip In	**Kim Hye-jun** – Chip In; Park Shin-ah – She Knows Everything; Son Na-eun – Dinner Mate; Lee Joo-myung – Kairos; Park So-jin – The Spies Who Loved Me; Lee Joo-bin – Find Me in Your Memory
Golden Acting Award	Best Couple Award
**Shim Yi-young** – My Wonderful Life	**Kim Dong-wook and Moon Ka-young** – Find Me in Your Memory; Eric Mun and Yoo In-na – The Spies Who Loved Me; Im Soo-hyang and Ji Soo – When I Was Most Beautiful; Nam Ji-hyun and Lee Joon-hyuk – 365: Repeat the Year; Park Hae-jin and Kim Eung-soo – Kkondae Intern; Shin Sung-rok and Lee Se-young – Kairos; Song Seung-heon and Seo Ji-hye – Dinner Mate

== See also ==
- 2020 KBS Drama Awards
- 2020 SBS Drama Awards
- 7th APAN Star Awards
