= Lee Jin-hyuk =

South Korean singer, rapper and actor (born 1996)

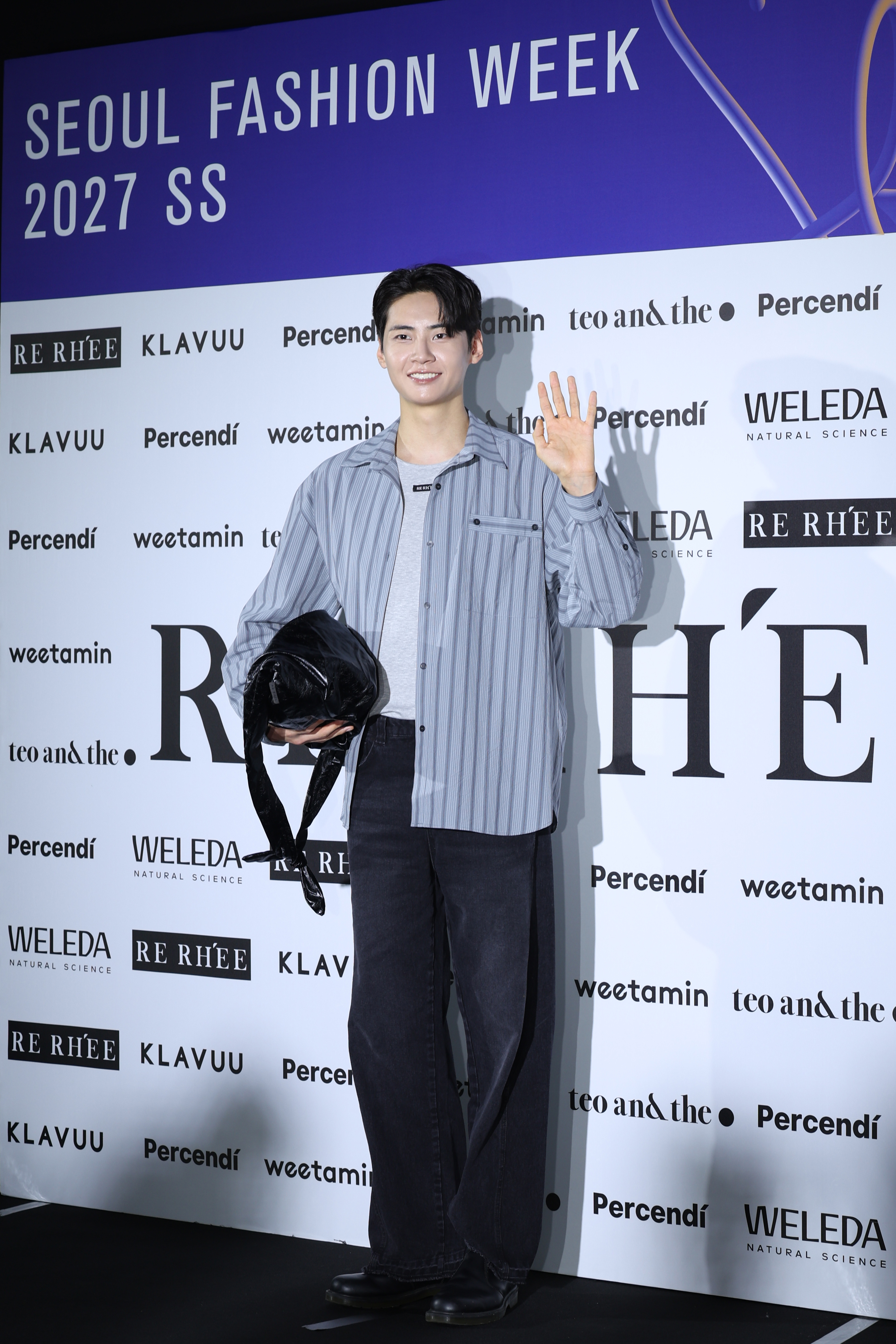
- Lee in 2026
- Born: Lee Sung-joon; June 8, 1996 (age 30); Seoul, South Korea
- Other name: Wei
- Occupations: Rapper; singer; actor
- Musical career
- Genres: K-pop; hip-hop
- Instrument: Vocals
- Years active: 2015–present
- Labels: Bill Entertainment; TOP Media
- Formerly of: Up10tion

Korean name
- Hangul: 이진혁
- Hanja: 李鎭赫
- RR: I Jinhyeok
- MR: I Chinhyŏk

Lee Jin-hyuk (Korean: 이진혁, born Lee Sung-joon on June 8, 1996), formerly known by the stage name Wei (Korean: 웨이), is a South Korean rapper, singer and actor. He debuted as a member of South Korean boy band UP10TION in 2015. In 2019, he rose to fame after finishing 14th on Produce X 101. Lee debuted as a solo artist with the release of his first extended play, S.O.L, on November 4, 2019. He debuted as an actor on MBC's drama Find Me in Your Memory as Jo Il-kwon.

== Career ==
=== 2015-present: Debut with UP10TION ===
Lee Jin-hyuk first appeared in UP10TION's pre-debut program "Masked rookie king" in 2015. He was the 9th member to be introduced to the group. He debuted as a member of UP10TION under the stage name Wei. On September 9, UP10TION held a debut showcase at AX Concert Hall in Seoul. UP10TION's debut mini album Top Secret, which includes the debut single "So, Dangerous", was released on September 11, 2015.

=== 2019–present: Produce X 101, solo debut and departure from Up10tion ===
Along with fellow member Kim Woo-seok, he took a hiatus from UP10TION group activities and competed as a trainee on Produce X 101. He finished the program ranking 11th, but because of the show's rule of the X position, he did not make the final lineup of X1. Officially, he ranked 14th in the finale.

After Produce X 101 completed, Lee held his first ever solo fan-meeting in Seoul, South Korea on August 10, 2019, followed by fan-meetings in Thailand on September 15, 2019, and in Taiwan on October 13, 2019. He is also holding solo fan-meetings in Philippines and Macau on December 14 and 21 respectively.

TOP Media announced that Lee would be debuting as a solo artist on November 4, 2019. His first extended play, S.O.L, was released, accompanied with the music video of the title track, "I Like That". He held his first solo debut showcase at KBS Arena on November 4, 2019, and the showcase was also broadcast live through Vlive app.

Lee released his second extended play Splash! on June 30, 2020, accompanied with the title track "Bedlam".

Lee debuted as an actor on a drama Find Me in Your Memory as Jo Il-kwon and it made him receive a nominee for MBC Drama Awards in the Best New Actor category. As of October 2020, it is confirmed that Lee will take part in the upcoming KBS2 drama Dear. M, set to be released in 2021, as the role of Gil Mok-jin, a second year student studying Psychology at Seoyeon University.

Lee returned with his third extended play Scene26 on April 5, 2021, accompanied with the title track "5K". In 2021, Lee participated in the semi-drama ON AIR - Secret Contract. Later, Lee was confirmed to be joining the 4-episode drama Check Out the Event which aired on MBC. Lee released his fourth extended play Ctrl+V on October 18, 2021, accompanied by the title track "Work Work".

In 2022, Lee joined the Weverse platform. The same year, he appeared in the SBS drama Why Her. On August 5, Lee has released spoiler posters for his 5th mini album 'Sight' (5ight), which was released on August 29.

In 2023, Lee held a solo concert '4eVer' at Watcha Hall from February 11 to 12. Later on February 28, it was announced that Lee would be leaving TOP Media, as well as Up10tion, after deciding not to renew his contract which expired on March 11. On March 27, Lee signed with Bill Entertainment.

== Personal life ==
As a child, Lee had an open heart surgery to repair his cardiac valve that did not function properly due to a heart disease.

On November 27, 2024, Lee was ruled exempt from mandatory military service due to congenital heart defect.

== Discography ==
=== Extended plays ===
Title	EP details	Peak chart positions	Sales
Title	EP details	KOR	Sales
S.O.L	Released: November 4, 2019; Label: TOP Media; Formats: CD, digital download, streaming; Track listing: 1. "I Like That"; 2. "Villein" (빌런); 3. "Follow Me & You" (돌아보지마)	2	KOR: 99,530
Splash!	Released: June 30, 2020; Label: TOP Media; Formats: CD, digital download, streaming; Track listing: 1. "Bedlam" (난장판); 2. "Picasso" (피카소); 3. "Rival" (라이벌); 4. "Holly Jolly" (홀리졸리); 5. "Playground" (놀이터); 6. "Sweet Rain" (단비); 7. "Don't Worry" (올라갈땐) (CD only)	6	KOR: 68,457
Scene26	Released: April 5, 2021; Label: TOP Media; Formats: CD, digital download, streaming; Track listing: 1. "5K"; 2. "Silence"; 3. "Asteroid" (소행성); 4. "Hati-Hati"; 5. "Be Half-Awake" (기지개); 6. "Wave" (끄덕); 7. "Coup d'État" (활)	6	KOR: 59,597
Ctrl+V	Released: October 18, 2021; Label: TOP Media; Formats: CD, digital download, streaming; Track listing: 1. "Work Work"; 2. "Bang All Night"; 3. "Dunk!"; 4. "Blue Marvel"; 5. "Coffee on Sunday"; 6. "Nothing" (의미 없 ≐ Art)	8	KOR: 52,725
5ight	Released: August 29, 2022; Label: TOP Media; Formats: CD, digital download, streaming; Track listing: 1. "Crack"; 2. "Exit"; 3. "Toy"; 4. "Morning Call"; 5. "Rooftop"; 6. "Jungle" (정글)	8	KOR: 21,926
New Quest: Jungle	Released: April 23, 2024; Label: Bill Entertainment; Formats: CD, digital download, streaming	10	KOR: 37,577

=== Singles ===
Title	Year	Peak chart position	Album
Title	Year	KOR	Album
"I Like That"	2019	141	S.O.L
"Bedlam" (난장판)	2020	—	Splash!
"5K"	2021	38	Scene26
"Work Work"	2021	116	Ctrl+V
"Crack"	2022	— (Note: "Crack" did not enter the Circle Digital Chart, but appeared at number 11 on the component Download Chart.)	5ight
"Relax"	2024	— (Note: "Relax" did not enter the Circle Digital Chart, but appeared at number 159 on the component Download Chart.)	New Quest: Jungle
"By Your Side"	2025	—	D-XXXX
"—" denotes releases that did not chart or were not released in that region.

== Filmography ==
=== Television series ===
Year	Title	Role	Notes	Ref.
2020	Find Me in Your Memory	Jo Il-kwon		
2021	Check Out the Event	Song Jong-ho	Short drama	
2022	Why Her	Nam Chun-poong		
2022	Dear.M	Gil Mok-jin		
2024	Frankly Speaking	Song Poong-baek		

=== Web series ===
Year	Title	Role	Ref.
2020	Hanging On!	Jeong Shin	
2021	ON AIR - Secret Contract	DJ Aaron / Ahn Du-ri	
2025	Spirit Fingers	Kwon Hyeok (Khaki Finger)	

=== Television shows ===
Year	Title	Role	Notes	Ref.
2019	Produce X 101	Contestant		
2019	Sister's Salon	Supporting cast		
2019	Tell Me	Cast member	Episodes 5–10	
2019	Five Cranky Brothers	Cast member (Regular)		
2019	Don Quixote	Cast member		
2021	I like rice on Saturday	Main cast		
2022	Godfather	Panelist	with Lee Geum-hee	
2022	9low On Top	Judge	Thai audition program	
2022	Sorry for Marriage	Host		

=== Web shows ===
Year	Title	Role	Ref.
2020	Boy's Mental Camp	Cast member	
2020	Holly Molly	Cast member	
2025	ZZINSAI	Host	

== Concert ==
- 4eVer (2023)

== Awards and nominations ==
Name of the award ceremony, year presented, category, nominee of the award, and the result of the nomination
Award ceremony	Year	Category	Nominee / Work	Result	Ref.
APAN Music Awards	2020	Entertainer of the Year – Male	Lee Jin-hyuk	Nominated	
MBC Drama Awards	2020	Best New Actor	Find Me in Your Memory	Nominated	
SBS Drama Awards	2022	Best Supporting Team	Why Her	Nominated	
