= Kairos (TV series) =

2020 South Korean fantasy television series

- Promotional poster
- Hangul: 카이로스
- RR: Kairoseu
- MR: K'airosŭ
- Genre: Fantasy; Thriller
- Created by: MBC Production Plan (Kwon Seong chang)
- Written by: Lee Soo-hyun
- Directed by: Park Seung-woo
- Starring: Shin Sung-rok; Lee Se-young; Ahn Bo-hyun; Nam Gyu-ri; Kang Seung-yoon
- Composer: Jang Young-kyu
- Country of origin: South Korea
- Original language: Korean
- No. of episodes: 16

Production
- Producers: Son Ok-hyun; Ju Bang-ok
- Running time: 70 minutes
- Production companies: OH Story; Blossom Story

Original release
- Network: MBC TV
- Release: October 26 – December 22, 2020

Kairos (Korean: 카이로스; RR: Kairoseu) is a South Korean television series starring Shin Sung-rok, Lee Se-young, Ahn Bo-hyun, Nam Gyu-ri, and Kang Seung-yoon. Directed by Park Seung-woo, the main themes of the series are opportunity and choice. It premiered on MBC TV on October 26 to December 22, 2020 and aired every Monday and Tuesday at 21:20 (KST).

The series is the last Monday-Tuesday drama project (월화 드라마) of MBC.

== Synopsis ==
Kim Seo-jin (Shin Sung-rok) is a successful and workaholic construction company director. One day, his daughter goes missing with no trace. Shortly after, his wife, Kang Hyun-chae (Nam Gyu-ri), commits suicide due to the shock.

Han Ae-ri (Lee Se-young) is a hard-working daughter whose mother goes missing in a hospital. She then receives a phone call from Seo-jin. He lives one month ahead of Ae-ri. He asks her to prevent the horrific events that destroyed his family and in return, she wants him to find her mother.

== Cast ==
=== Main ===
- Shin Sung-rok as Kim Seo-jin
  - Lee Jung-joon as young Kim Seo-jin
- Lee Se-young as Han Ae-ri
- Ahn Bo-hyun as Seo Do-gyun
- Nam Gyu-ri as Kang Hyun-chae, Seo-jin's wife and Kim Da-bin's mother
- Kang Seung-yoon as Im Geon-wook

=== Supporting ===
==== People associated with Seo-jin ====
- Shim Hye-yeon as Kim Da-bin, Kim Seo-jin and Kang Hyun-chae's daughter
- So Hee-jung as Jung Hye-kyeong, Da-bin's babysitter

==== People associated with Ae-ri ====
- Hwang Jung-min as Kwak Song-ja, Ae-ri's mother
- Lee Ju-myoung as Park Soo-jung, Ae-ri's best friend

==== Yujung Construction ====
- Shin Goo as Yoo Seo-il, Chairman of Yujung Construction
- Cho Dong-in as Lee Taek-gyu, Kim Seo-jin's personal assistant

==== Detectives ====
- Lim Chul-hyung as Park Ho-young
- Jeon Kwang-jin as Choi Deok-ho
- Jung Sung-joon as Lee Tae-woo
- Lee Tae-gu as Kang Byeong-suk

==== Others ====
- Choi Deok-moon as Kim Yoo-seok
- Kwon Hyuk as Han Tae-gil
- Ko Kyu-pil as Kim Jin-ho

=== Special appearances ===
- Lee Si-eon as delivery man, suspect in Da-bin's kidnapping case (Ep. 1–2)
- Sung Ji-ru
- Jung Hee-tae

== Original soundtrack ==
Soundtrack album by Various Artists
- Released: 2020
- Genre: Soundtrack
- Languages: Korean; English
- Label: Warner Music Korea

=== Part 1 ===
Released on October 26, 2020
No.	Title	Lyrics	Music	Artist	Length
1.	"Like a Star"	Norwegian Wood; iT's	Norwegian Wood; iT's; Gu Ye-bin	iT's	2:37
2.	"Like a Star" (Inst.)		Norwegian Wood; iT's; Gu Ye-bin		2:37
Total length:					5:14

=== Part 2 ===
Released on November 3, 2020
No.	Title	Lyrics	Music	Artist	Length
1.	"I Live a Day" (너라는 하루를 살아)	Juho; B.O.K	Juho; B.O.K	Juho	4:03
2.	"I Live a Day" (Inst.)		Juho; B.O.K		4:03
Total length:					8:06

=== Part 3 ===
Released on November 7, 2020
No.	Title	Lyrics	Music	Artist	Length
1.	"Own Pain"	Yoon Sang-jo; Kang Yeon-wook	Yoon Sang-jo; Kang Yeon-wook	Hajin	3:26
2.	"Own Pain" (Inst.)		Yoon Sang-jo; Kang Yeon-wook		3:26
Total length:					6:52

=== Part 4 ===
Released on November 9, 2020
No.	Title	Lyrics	Music	Artist	Length
1.	"Next Story" (다음이야기)	Kim Na-ra	Kim Na-ra; Yoon Sang-jo; Kang Yeon-wook	Jeong Dong-won	4:25
2.	"Next Story" (Inst.)		Kim Na-ra; Yoon Sang-jo; Kang Yeon-wook		4:25
Total length:					8:50

=== Part 5 ===
Released on November 14, 2020
No.	Title	Lyrics	Music	Artist	Length
1.	"Pray"	Ursa Major; Park Shi-on	Ursa Major; Park Shi-on	Tart	3:10
2.	"Pray" (Inst.)		Ursa Major; Park Shi-on		3:10
Total length:					6:20

=== Part 6 ===
Released on November 16, 2020
No.	Title	Lyrics	Music	Artist	Length
1.	"Scattered" (흩어져가)	Kim Tae-hyun (The Brothers)	Kim Tae-hyun (The Brothers); Ursa Major	Kim Tae-hyun (The Brothers)	3:49
2.	"Scattered" (Inst.)		Kim Tae-hyun (The Brothers); Ursa Major		3:49
Total length:					7:38

=== Part 7 ===
Released on November 22, 2020
No.	Title	Lyrics	Music	Artist	Length
1.	"Stopped" (헤어진 그날에 모든게 멈춰져 있어)	Pil Seung Bool Pae; Almond	Pil Seung Bool Pae; 1L2L	Gawon	2:34
2.	"Stopped" (Inst.)		Pil Seung Bool Pae; 1L2L		2:34
Total length:					5:08

=== Part 8 ===
Released on November 24, 2020
No.	Title	Lyrics	Music	Artist	Length
1.	"Can You Hear Me"	Pil Seung Bool Pae; Almond	Han Sang-won	Kang Seung-yoon (WINNER)	2:51
2.	"Can You Hear Me" (Inst.)		Han Sang-won		2:51
Total length:					5:42

=== Part 9 ===
Released on November 28, 2020
No.	Title	Lyrics	Music	Artist	Length
1.	"Where Are You"	Pil Seung Bool Pae; Almond	Pil Seung Bool Pae	A.C.E	3:41
2.	"Where Are You" (Inst.)		Pil Seung Bool Pae		3:41
Total length:					7:22

=== Part 10 ===
Released on November 30, 2020
No.	Title	Lyrics	Music	Artist	Length
1.	"Stay With Me"	Pil Seung Bool Pae; Jamie; Almond	Pil Seung Bool Pae; Jamie	Jung Ga-yi (Wine Loop)	3:45
2.	"Stay With Me" (Inst.)		Pil Seung Bool Pae; Jamie		3:45
Total length:					7:30

=== Part 11 ===
Released on December 6, 2020
No.	Title	Lyrics	Music	Artist	Length
1.	"I Cry and Miss You" (울다가 또 너를 그리워 하다가)	Pil Seung Bool Pae; Yoo Ji-hee; Almond	Pil Seung Bool Pae; Yoo Ji-hee	The Daisy	3:45
2.	"I Cry and Miss You" (Inst.)		Pil Seung Bool Pae; Yoo Ji-hee		3:45
Total length:					7:30

=== Part 12 ===
Released on December 7, 2020
No.	Title	Lyrics	Music	Artist	Length
1.	"Somehow We" (어쩌다 우리)	Pil Seung Bool Pae; Almond	Pil Seung Bool Pae; Park Ji-man	Seo Seong-hyuk	4:12
2.	"Somehow We" (Inst.)		Pil Seung Bool Pae; Park Ji-man		4:12
Total length:					8:24

=== Part 13 ===
Released on December 12, 2020
No.	Title	Lyrics	Music	Artist	Length
1.	"Why Is It" (왜 이런 건가요)	Pil Seung Bool Pae; Almond	Pil Seung Bool Pae	Damu	3:29
2.	"Why Is It" (Inst.)		Pil Seung Bool Pae		3:29
Total length:					6:58

=== Part 14 ===
Released on December 15, 2020
No.	Title	Lyrics	Music	Artist	Length
1.	"Heart Feels Cold" (가슴이 시리도록)	Pil Seung Bool Pae; Jamie; Almond	Pil Seung Bool Pae; Jamie; Laconic	The Lime	3:54
2.	"Heart Feels Cold" (Inst.)		Pil Seung Bool Pae; Jamie; Laconic		3:54
Total length:					7:48

=== Part 15 ===
Released on December 20, 2020
No.	Title	Lyrics	Music	Artist	Length
1.	"One Day Is a Mess" (하루가 엉망이야)	Pil Seung Bool Pae; Yoo Ji-hee; Almond	Pil Seung Bool Pae; Yoo Ji-hee	Lydia	4:21
2.	"One Day Is a Mess" (Inst.)		Pil Seung Bool Pae; Yoo Ji-hee		4:21
Total length:					8:42

=== Part 16 ===
Released on December 21, 2020
No.	Title	Lyrics	Music	Artist	Length
1.	"Yet" (아직)	Langyee	Langyee; Kim Sung-hyuk	Langyee	4:28
2.	"Yet" (Inst.)		Langyee; Kim Sung-hyuk		4:28
Total length:					8:56

== Ratings ==
Average TV viewership ratings
Ep.	Part	Original broadcast date	Average audience share (Nielsen Korea)
1	1	October 26, 2020	2.7%
1	2	October 26, 2020	3.7%
2	1	October 27, 2020	2.7%
2	2	October 27, 2020	3.1%
3	1	November 2, 2020	3.0%
3	2	November 2, 2020	3.3%
4	1	November 3, 2020	3.0%
4	2	November 3, 2020	3.5%
5	1	November 10, 2020	3.1%
5	2	November 10, 2020	3.4%
6	1	November 16, 2020	3.3%
6	2	November 16, 2020	3.0%
7	1	November 24, 2020	2.6%
7	2	November 24, 2020	2.7%
8	1	November 24, 2020	3.0%
8	2	November 24, 2020	3.8%
9	1	November 30, 2020	3.4%
9	2	November 30, 2020	3.2%
10	1	December 1, 2020	3.5%
10	2	December 1, 2020	2.8%
11	1	December 7, 2020	3.1%
11	2	December 7, 2020	2.7%
12	1	December 8, 2020	2.9%
12	2	December 8, 2020	2.6%
13	1	December 14, 2020	2.9%
13	2	December 14, 2020	2.7%
14	1	December 15, 2020	3.5%
14	2	December 15, 2020	2.6%
15	1	December 21, 2020	2.7%
15	2	December 21, 2020	2.2%
16	1	December 22, 2020	3.3%
16	2	December 22, 2020	3.3%
Average			3.0%
The blue numbers represent the lowest ratings and the red numbers represent the highest ratings.

== Awards and nominations ==
Name of the award ceremony, year presented, category, nominee of the award, and the result of the nomination
Award ceremony	Year	Category	Nominee / Work	Result	Ref.
MBC Drama Awards	2020	Drama of the Year	Kairos	Nominated	
MBC Drama Awards	2020	Top Excellence Award, Actor in a Monday-Tuesday Miniseries / Short Drama	Shin Sung-rok	Won	
MBC Drama Awards	2020	Top Excellence Award, Actress in a Monday-Tuesday Miniseries / Short Drama	Lee Se-young	Nominated	
MBC Drama Awards	2020	Excellence Award, Actor in a Monday-Tuesday Miniseries / Short Drama	Ahn Bo-hyun	Nominated	
MBC Drama Awards	2020	Excellence Award, Actress in a Monday-Tuesday Miniseries / Short Drama	Nam Gyu-ri	Won	
MBC Drama Awards	2020	Best Supporting Actor	Ko Kyu-pil	Nominated	
MBC Drama Awards	2020	Best Supporting Actress	Hwang Jung-min	Nominated	
MBC Drama Awards	2020	Best New Actor	Ahn Bo-hyun	Won	
MBC Drama Awards	2020	Best New Actor	Kang Seung-yoon	Nominated	
MBC Drama Awards	2020	Best New Actress	Lee Joo-myoung	Nominated	
MBC Drama Awards	2020	Best Couple Award	Shin Sung-rok and Lee Se-young	Nominated	
Seoul International Drama Awards	2021	Outstanding Korean Drama	Kairos	Won	
Seoul International Drama Awards	2021	Outstanding Korean Actress	Lee Se-young and Lee Il-hwa	Nominated	
