= Tell Me (TV series) =

South Korean television show

- Promotional Poster
- Also known as: Hurry Up and Talk
- Hangul: 어서 말을 해
- RR: Eoseo mareul hae
- MR: Ŏsŏ marŭl hae
- Genre: Reality
- Starring: Jun Hyun-moo; Park Na-rae; Kim Jung-nan; Moon Se-yoon; Lee Jin-hyuk
- Country of origin: South Korea
- Original language: Korean
- No. of seasons: 1
- No. of episodes: 10

Production
- Production location: South Korea
- Running time: 80 minutes

Original release
- Network: JTBC
- Release: August 13 – October 22, 2019

Tell Me (Korean: 어서 말을 해) is a South Korea quiz show program on JTBC starring Jun Hyun-moo, Park Na-rae, Kim Jung-nan, Moon Se-yoon and Lee Jin-hyuk. The show airs on every Tuesday at 22:00 (KST) starting from August 13, 2019.

== Casts ==
=== Current casts ===
- Jun Hyun-moo (1 – 10)
- Park Na-rae (1 – 10)
- Kim Jung-nan (1 – 10)
- Moon Se-yoon (1 – 10)
- Lee Jin-hyuk (5 – 10)

=== Previous casts ===
- Jung Sang-hoon (1 – 4)
- Kang Ji-young (1 – 4)

== Guests ==
Episode	Air Date	Guests	Ref.
1	August 13, 2019	Lee Hong-gi, DinDin, Yoo Hwe-seung (N.Flying)	
2	August 20, 2019	DinDin, Kim Hee-chul, Ravi (VIXX), Kim So-hye	
3	August 27, 2019	Yoo Min-sang, Hong Yoon-hwa, Ravi (VIXX)	
4	September 3, 2019	Irene, Jung Hyuk, Hwang Jae-sung	
5	September 10, 2019	Boom, Ji Sang-ryeol, Yoo Hwe-seung (N.Flying), DinDin	
6	September 17, 2019	Boom, Ji Sang-ryeol, DinDin, Swings	
7	September 24, 2019	Boom, Yoo Hwe-seung, Bona (Cosmic Girls), Soobin (Cosmic Girls)	
8	October 8, 2019	Boom, DinDin, Ahn Young-mi, Moonbin (Astro)	
9	October 15, 2019	Boom, DinDin, Kim Jong-min (Koyote), Shin Ji (Koyote)	
10	October 22, 2019	Boom, Kim Seung-hyun, Choi Jae-woo	

== Ratings ==
- Ratings listed below are the individual corner ratings of Tell Me. (Note: Individual corner ratings do not include commercial time, which regular ratings include.)
- In the ratings below, the highest rating for the show will be in red and the lowest rating for the show will be in blue each year.

Ep. #	Original Airdate	AGB Nielsen Ratings Nationwide
1	August 13, 2019	1.246%
2	August 20, 2019	1.199%
3	August 27, 2019	0.916%
4	September 3, 2019	0.934%
5	September 10, 2019	1.033%
6	September 17, 2019	0.848%
7	September 24, 2019	1.022%
8	October 8, 2019	0.853%
9	October 15, 2019	0.935%
10	October 22, 2019	0.612%
