= The Spies Who Loved Me =

2020 South Korean television series

- Promotional poster
- Also known as: The Spy Who Loves Me
- Hangul: 나를 사랑한 스파이
- RR: Nareul saranghan seupai
- MR: Narŭl saranghan sŭp'ai
- Genre: Action; Romance; Comedy
- Written by: Lee Ji-min
- Directed by: Lee Jae-jin
- Starring: Eric Mun; Yoo In-na; Lim Ju-hwan
- Country of origin: South Korea
- Original language: Korean
- No. of episodes: 16

Production
- Producer: Hwang Ji-woo
- Running time: 70 minutes
- Production company: Story & Pictures Media

Original release
- Network: MBC TV
- Release: October 21 – December 17, 2020

The Spies Who Loved Me (Korean: 나를 사랑한 스파이; RR: Nareul saranghan seupai) is a South Korean television series starring Eric Mun, Yoo In-na, and Lim Ju-hwan. The series revolves around Kang Ah-Reum (Yoo In-na), a wedding dress designer, and her two husbands; ex Jun Ji-Hoon (Eric Mun) and current husband Derek Hyun (Im Joo Hwan), who both hide their real identities from her. It premiered on MBC TV on October 21, 2020, airing twice a week. It is also available on iQIYI for streaming worldwide.

== Synopsis ==
Kang Ah-Reum is a wedding dress designer who has been married twice. Her ex happens to be an undercover Interpol agent, while her current husband is an industrial spy. After a close friend is murdered for her involvement in the well-known EcoSun project, Ah-Reum seeks the help of Ji-Hoon and his team in finding out the truth, along the way uncovering dark and shocking secrets about those closest to her.

== Cast ==
=== Main ===
- Eric Mun as Jun Ji-Hoon, Kang Ah-Reum's first husband who is a secret Interpol agent disguised as a travel writer.
- Yoo In-na as Kang Ah-Reum, a wedding dress designer and owner of the shop Areumdaun Dress. She is married to Derek Hyun.
- Lim Ju-hwan as Derek Hyun, Kang Ah-Reum's second husband and a cold-blooded industrial spy, who works as the CEO of an industrial spy agency.

=== Supporting ===
==== People around Jun Ji-hoon ====
- Kim Tae-woo as Ban Jin-min, Director of Asian Affairs at Interpol's Industrial and Confidential Bureau.
- Jeong Suk-yong as Kang Tae-ryong, the head of the second Asia Branch of Interpol's Industrial Confidentiality Bureau disguised as a representative of the publishing company, Gulliver's Publishers.
- Cha Joo-young as Hwang Seo-ra, an Interpol secret agent with an IQ of 157. She is the one who Ah-Reum believes Ji-Hoon had an affair with, though in reality, it was all a misunderstanding.
- Bae In-hyuk as Kim Young-goo, a junior agent of the Bureau disguised as the sales manager of the publishing company. The youngest of the team who specializes in analytics.

==== People around Kang Ah-reum ====
- Park So-jin as Bae Doo-rae, Ah-reum's business partner and best friend, and the co-CEO of the wedding dress shop
- Kim Chung as Han Bok-sim, Ah-reum's mother and the hostess of the Dongbaekjudan
- Yoon So-hee as Sophie Ahn, a genius scientist in charge of the EcoSun Project, and Ah-reum's friend. She is the informant that Ji-Hoon is looking for early in the series.

==== People around Derek Hyun ====
- Jeon Seung-bin as Peter, Asia division industrial spy.
- Lee Jong-won as Tinker, an agent, M Classic Car CEO and a classic car restoration specialist.
- Kim Hye-ok as Hye Ra-sin, Derek Hyun's grandmother.

=== Others ===
- Lee Joo-woo as Kim Dong-ran, DDK Group's second daughter and CEO of DDK Bora Food.
- Moon Ji-hoo as Doo-bong's underling
- Lee Ha-eun as Yoon Yeo-jung
- Jang Jae-ho as Kim Dong-taek
- Ji Hyun-joon as Jang Doo-bong

=== Special appearance ===
- Ahn Hee-yeon as Hacker (ep. 8-9)

== Production ==
It is the first drama by screenwriter Lee Ji-min, who has previously produced films such as The Man Standing Next, Forbidden Dream and The Age of Shadows. MBC confirmed the casting of Eric Mun, Yoo In-na and Lim Ju-hwan on June 22, 2020 in a press release that described the series as a "romantic spy drama". The main poster was revealed on September 29.

== Original soundtrack ==
The Spies Who Loved Me OST

Soundtrack album by Various artists
- Released: 2020
- Genre: Soundtrack
- Languages: Korean; English
- Labels: Kakao M; Flex M

=== Part 1 ===
Released on October 29, 2020
No.	Title	Lyrics	Music	Artist	Length
1.	"Shall We Kiss?" (키스해볼까?)	Choi Gap-won; Good Choice	ZigZag Note	Jung Yong-hwa (CNBLUE)	3:23
2.	"Shall We Kiss?" (Inst.)		ZigZag Note		3:23
Total length:					6:46

=== Part 2 ===
Released on October 29, 2020
No.	Title	Lyrics	Music	Artist	Length
1.	"Only You Don't Know" (너만 몰라)	Good Choice; Choi Gap-won	Sim; Jeon Geun-hwa (Weeky1); CLEF CREW	Lee Min-hyuk	3:20
2.	"Only You Don't Know" (Inst.)		Sim; Jeon Geun-hwa (Weeky1); CLEF CREW		3:20
Total length:					6:40

=== Part 3 ===
Released on November 7, 2020
No.	Title	Lyrics	Music	Artist	Length
1.	"Run To You"	Luka (Artmatic); Yoo Su-jinGadeul	Park Geun-cheol; Jeong Su-min; Yoo Woong-yeol	Yoo Hwe-seung (N.Flying)	3:54
2.	"Run To You" (Inst.)		Park Geun-cheol; Jeong Su-min; Yoo Woong-yeol		3:54
Total length:					7:48

=== Special Track ===
Released on November 12, 2020
No.	Title	Lyrics	Music	Artist	Length
1.	"Let Me Dance"	Park Kyung-jin; LE	Sypher Muzik; Kang Tae-won	Everglow	3:20
2.	"Let Me Dance" (Inst.)		Sypher Muzik; Kang Tae-won		3:20
Total length:					6:40

=== Part 4 ===
Released on November 18, 2020
No.	Title	Lyrics	Music	Artist	Length
1.	"Wherever" (어디라도)	Gaemi; Gadeul	Gaemi	Baek A-yeon	4:05
2.	"Wherever" (Inst.)		Gaemi		4:05
Total length:					8:10

== Viewership ==
Average TV viewership ratings
Ep.	Part	Original broadcast date	Average audience share (Nielsen Korea)
Ep.	Part	Original broadcast date	Nationwide
1	1	October 21, 2020	3.7%
1	2	October 21, 2020	4.3%
2	1	October 22, 2020	3.0%
2	2	October 22, 2020	3.2%
3	1	October 28, 2020	1.8%
3	2	October 28, 2020	2.4%
4	1	October 29, 2020	2.8%
4	2	October 29, 2020	2.6%
5	1	November 5, 2020 (Note: No episodes were aired on November 4 due to a KBO League baseball game broadcast.)	2.8%
5	2	November 5, 2020	3.2%
6	1	November 11, 2020	2.2%
6	2	November 11, 2020	2.4%
7	1	November 12, 2020	2.7%
7	2	November 12, 2020	3.1%
8	1	November 19, 2020	3.0%
8	2	November 19, 2020	2.8%
9	1	November 25, 2020	1.6%
9	2	November 25, 2020	1.5%
10	1	November 26, 2020	2.1%
10	2	November 26, 2020	2.5%
11	1	December 2, 2020	2.1%
11	2	December 2, 2020	2.2%
12	1	December 3, 2020	2.2%
12	2	December 3, 2020	2.6%
13	1	December 9, 2020	1.8%
13	2	December 9, 2020	2.3%
14	1	December 10, 2020	2.9%
14	2	December 10, 2020	2.8%
15	1	December 16, 2020	1.8%
15	2	December 16, 2020	2.0%
16	1	December 17, 2020	2.5%
16	2	December 17, 2020	2.8%
Average			%
In the table above, the blue numbers represent the lowest ratings and the red numbers represent the highest ratings.; NR denotes that the drama did not rank in the top 20 daily programs on that date.

== International broadcast ==
The series is available same time as Korea, as an iQIYI Original and exclusively on iQIYI globally (except China and Korea) with multilingual subtitles. It is also available non-exclusively on iQIYI in South Korea.

== Awards and nominations ==
Year	Award	Category	Recipient	Result
2020	39th MBC Drama Awards	Drama of the Year	The Spies Who Loved Me	Nominated
2020	39th MBC Drama Awards	Top Excellence Award, Actor in a Wednesday-Thursday Miniseries	Eric Mun	Nominated
2020	39th MBC Drama Awards	Top Excellence Award, Actress in a Wednesday-Thursday Miniseries	Yoo In-na	Nominated
2020	39th MBC Drama Awards	Excellence Award, Actor in a Wednesday-Thursday Miniseries	Lim Ju-hwan (Note: Lim won the award for his roles in The Spies Who Loved Me and The Game: Towards Zero.)	Won
2020	39th MBC Drama Awards	Best Supporting Actor	Kim Tae-woo	Nominated
2020	39th MBC Drama Awards	Best Supporting Actress	Cha Joo-young	Nominated
2020	39th MBC Drama Awards	Best New Actor	Bae In-hyuk	Nominated
2020	39th MBC Drama Awards	Best New Actress	Park So-jin	Nominated
2020	39th MBC Drama Awards	Best Couple	Eric Mun & Yoo In-na	Nominated
