= Find Me in Your Memory =

2020 South Korean television series

- Promotional poster
- Hangul: 그 남자의 기억법
- Lit.: Memoir of the Man
- RR: Geu namjaui gieokbeop
- MR: Kŭ namjaŭi kiŏkpŏp
- Genre: Romance; Melodrama; Mystery
- Written by: Kim Yoon-joo; Yoon Ji-hyun
- Directed by: Oh Hyun-jong; Lee Soo-hyun
- Starring: Kim Dong-wook; Moon Ka-young
- Music by: Kim Joon-seok; Jeong se-rin
- Country of origin: South Korea
- Original language: Korean
- No. of episodes: 32 (Note: In order to circumvent Korean laws that prevent commercial breaks in the middle of an episode, what would previously have been aired as single 70 minute episodes are now being repackaged as two 35 minute episodes, with two episodes being shown each night with a commercial break between the two.)

Production
- Camera setup: Single-camera
- Running time: 35 minutes
- Production company: Chorokbaem Media
- Budget: ₩8.992 billion

Original release
- Network: MBC TV
- Release: March 18 – May 13, 2020

Find Me in Your Memory (Korean: 그 남자의 기억법) is a 2020 South Korean television series starring Kim Dong-wook and Moon Ka-young. It aired on MBC TV from March 18 to May 13, 2020.

== Synopsis ==
A love story between a man who remembers every second of his life and a woman who forgot her painful past to live.

Lee Jung-hoon works as an anchorman at a broadcasting station. He has hyperthymesia, a condition that allows him to remember nearly every moment in his life. Meanwhile, Yeo Ha-jin is a top actress. She has forgotten her past. Due to this, she lives as she pleases.

== Cast ==
=== Main ===
- Kim Dong-wook as Lee Jung-hoon, anchorman for Live News who is loved for exposing his guests' wrongdoings.
- Moon Ga-young as Yeo Ha-jin, a model-turned-actress who is recognized as a power influencer.

=== Supporting ===
==== People around Jung-hoon ====
- Cha Kwang-soo as Lee Dong-young, Jung-hoon's father who's a carpenter.
- Gil Hae-yeon as Seo Mi-hyun, a poet and Jung-hoon's mother.
- Lee Joo-bin as Jung Seo-yeon, a ballerina who was Jung-hoon's first love and girlfriend.
- Yoon Jong-hoon as Yoo Tae-eun, a neuropsychiatrist and Jung-hoon's best friend.

==== People around Ha-jin ====
- Kim Seul-gi as Yeo Ha-kyung, Ha-jin's little sister and manager.
- Lee Soo-mi as Park Kyung-ae, the CEO of Ha-jin's agency.
- Shin Joo-hyup as Moon Cheol, Ha-jin's road manager.

==== People around Tae-eun ====
- Kim Chang-wan as Yoo Sung-hyuk, Tae-eun's father and a university professor who wrote a thesis on Jung-hoon's condition.
- Jang Yi-jung as Yoo Ji-won, Tae-eun's sister from his father's remarriage.
- Yoo Ji-soo as Jin So-young, Seong-hyeok's wife and Tae-eun's stepmother.

==== People at the Press Bureau ====
- Jang Young-nam as Choi Hee-sang, director of the news reporting bureau who is married to Cheol-woong.
- Lee Jin-hyuk as Jo Il-kwon, a newsroom reporter and Jung-hoon's junior colleague.
- Lee Seung-joon as Kim Cheol-woong, News Live director who is married to Hee-sang.

==== Others ====
- Ji Il-joo as Ji Hyun-geun, a movie director who helmed Ha-jin's film My First Love.
- Kwon Eun-soo as News Media Staff .
- Jang In-sub as Park Soo-chang, a reporter.
- Kim Nam-hee as Drama Director.
- Lee Soo-mi as Park Kyung-ae
- Park Ji-won as Kim Hee-young, a nurse.
- Joo Seok-tae as Moon Sung-ho, Seo-yeon's stalker.
- Han Da-mi as an assistant director.

=== Special appearances ===
- Park Sung-geun as Oh Taek-won (Ep. 1)

Chairman of Hwarang Department Store. During a live interview, Jung-hoon exposes him for abusing his personal assistant.

- Kim Seon-ho as Seo Gwang-jin (Ep. 1)

An actor who is caught up in a dating scandal with Ha-jin after a paparazzo takes a picture of them in the parking lot of Gwang-jin's building.

- Rowoon as Joo Yeo-min (Ep. 1)

An idol who is caught up in a dating scandal with Ha-jin after a paparazzo takes a picture of them in Yeo-min's car.

- Yura as herself (Ep. 2 & 4)

An actress who often bullied Ha-jin while working with her.

- Hong Yoon-hwa as herself (Ep. 4)

A reporter from Section TV Entertainment News who does a street interview with Ha-jin about her upcoming film My First Love.

- Kim Eana as herself (Ep. 5)

Host of the radio show Nighttime Letters who interviews Ha-jin about her film My First Love.

- Shin Dong-mi as Writer Hwang (Ep. 11)

A famous screenwriter that Ha-jin admires. She is a fan of Jung-hoon.

- Kim Nam-hui as himself (Ep. 11)

A drama director who works with writer Hwang. He was against Ha-jin's casting.

- Yangpa as herself (Ep. 18)

Radio DJ who receives Ha-jin as a guest.

- Ok Ja-yeon as Ms. Kang (Ep. 30)

A woman suspected of being involved in her husband Shim Jae-chul's murder. She is exposed by Lee Jung-hoon.

- Park Jin-woo as Yang Jin-woo (Ep. 31–32)

A film director who cast Ha-jin as the lead actress in his film Find Me in Your Memory.

== Production ==
The first script reading took place on February 12, 2020.

== Original soundtrack ==
Find Me in Your Memory OST

Soundtrack album by Various Artists
- Released: 2020
- Genre: Soundtrack
- Languages: Korean; English
- Labels: Music Buddy Co., Ltd.; Vlending Co., Ltd.

=== Part 1 ===
Released on March 26, 2020
No.	Title	Lyrics	Music	Artist	Length
1.	"Here We Are" (나의 오늘이 너의 오늘을 만나 (Note: Lit. "My Today Meets Your Today"))	Lee Chi-hoon	Park Sung-il	Jooyoung	4:04
2.	"Here We Are" (Inst.)		Park Sung-il		4:04
Total length:					8:08

=== Part 2 ===
Released on April 1, 2020
No.	Title	Lyrics	Music	Artist	Length
1.	"One Day" (하루)	Geumeumdal	Geumeumdal	Solji	4:05
2.	"One Day" (Inst.)		Geumeumdal		4:05
Total length:					8:10

=== Part 3 ===
Released on April 2, 2020
No.	Title	Lyrics	Music	Artist	Length
1.	"A Memory In My Heart" (마음의 기록)	Seo Ha-na; Yangpa	Park Sung-il	Yangpa	3:47
2.	"A Memory In My Heart" (Inst.)		Park Sung-il		3:47
Total length:					7:34

=== Part 4 ===
Released on April 8, 2020
No.	Title	Lyrics	Music	Artist	Length
1.	"Two People" (두사람)	Yoon Young-joon	Yoon Young-joon	Suran	4:28
2.	"Two People" (Inst.)		Yoon Young-joon		4:28
Total length:					8:56

=== Part 5 ===
Released on April 23, 2020
No.	Title	Lyrics	Music	Artist	Length
1.	"While The Memories Are Asleep" (기억이 잠든 사이에)	Taibian	Taibian, Bark	Kang Seung-sik	4:25
2.	"While The Memories Are Asleep" (Inst.)		Taibian, Bark		4:25
Total length:					8:52

== Ratings ==
In this table, the blue numbers represent the lowest ratings and the red numbers represent the highest ratings.

Ep.	Original broadcast date	Average audience share
Ep.	Original broadcast date	Nielsen Korea
Ep.	Original broadcast date	Nationwide
1	March 18, 2020	3.0% (44th)
2	March 18, 2020	4.5% (26th)
3	March 19, 2020	3.5% (34th)
4	March 19, 2020	3.4% (35th)
5	March 25, 2020	3.2% (39th)
6	March 25, 2020	4.3% (27th)
7	March 26, 2020	3.3% (33rd)
8	March 26, 2020	3.5% (30th)
9	April 1, 2020	3.4% (39th)
10	April 1, 2020	4.5% (26th)
11	April 2, 2020	3.2% (30th)
12	April 2, 2020	4.0% 25th)
13	April 8, 2020	4.0% (31st)
14	April 8, 2020	5.4% (24th)
15	April 9, 2020	3.3% (30th)
16	April 9, 2020	3.9% (25th)
17	April 16, 2020 (Note: Broadcast was delayed due to the 2020 South Korean legislative election.)	3.1% (34th)
18	April 16, 2020	3.2% (33rd)
19	April 22, 2020	3.6% (36th)
20	April 22, 2020	4.8% (25th)
21	April 23, 2020	2.6% (37th)
22	April 23, 2020	3.0% (31st)
23	April 29, 2020	2.9% (41st)
24	April 29, 2020	3.9% (32nd)
25	April 30, 2020	2.3% (48th)
26	April 30, 2020	3.1% (34th)
27	May 6, 2020	3.4% (33rd)
28	May 6, 2020	4.1% (26th)
29	May 7, 2020	2.6% (37th)
30	May 7, 2020	2.8% (36th)
31	May 13, 2020	2.5% (44th)
32	May 13, 2020	3.6% (33rd)
Average		3.5%

- On April 13, 2020, it was reported that episode scheduled for April 15 will air on April 16, and the episode scheduled for April 16 will air on April 22 due to the 2020 South Korean legislative election.

== Awards and nominations ==
Year	Award	Category	Recipient	Result
2020	39th MBC Drama Awards	Drama of the Year	Find Me in Your Memory	Nominated
2020	39th MBC Drama Awards	Top Excellence Award, Actor in a Wednesday-Thursday Miniseries	Kim Dong-wook	Nominated
2020	39th MBC Drama Awards	Top Excellence Award, Actress in a Wednesday-Thursday Miniseries	Moon Ga-young	Nominated
2020	39th MBC Drama Awards	Excellence Award, Actor in a Wednesday-Thursday Miniseries	Yoon Jong-hoon	Nominated
2020	39th MBC Drama Awards	Excellence Award, Actress in a Wednesday-Thursday Miniseries	Kim Seul-gi	Won
2020	39th MBC Drama Awards	Best Supporting Actor	Joo Seok-tae	Nominated
2020	39th MBC Drama Awards	Best Supporting Actress	Jang Young-nam	Nominated
2020	39th MBC Drama Awards	Best New Actor	Lee Jin-hyuk	Nominated
2020	39th MBC Drama Awards	Best New Actress	Lee Joo-bin	Nominated
2020	39th MBC Drama Awards	Best Couple	Kim Dong-wook & Moon Ga-young	Won
