= Shin Sung-rok =

South Korean actor

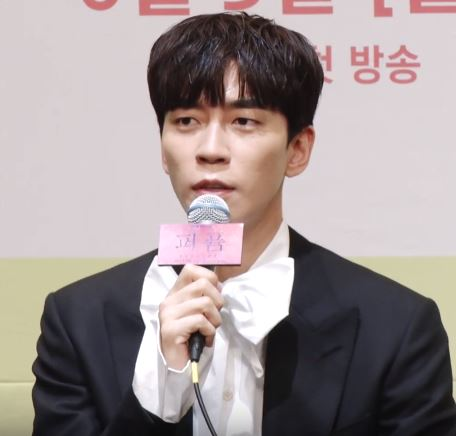
- Shin in 2019
- Born: November 23, 1982 (age 43); Seoul, South Korea
- Occupation: Actor
- Years active: 2003–present
- Agent: Y1 Entertainment
- Height: 1.89 m (6 ft 2 1/2 in)
- Spouse: Unknown (m. 2016)
- Children: 1

Korean name
- Hangul: 신성록
- Hanja: 申成祿
- RR: Sin Seongrok
- MR: Sin Sŏngnok

Shin Sung-rok (Korean: 신성록; born November 23, 1982) is a South Korean actor. He frequently appears in films and television series, but is better known as active in musical theatre.

== Early life ==
Shin had initially aspired to become a basketball player together with his brother Je-rok, who is two years younger. Both brothers attended Whimoon High School, known as one of Seoul's top high school basketball programs. An injury prompted Shin to reconsider another career and he transferred to Anyang Arts High School. He majored in Theater and Film at the University of Suwon but subsequently dropped out after being cast in a play.

== Career ==
Shin made his acting debut in 2003, but found it difficult to find acting jobs since directors were reluctant to cast the 189 centimeter-tall aspiring actor in supporting or minor roles. Thinking he would have a better chance if he gained more acting experience and honed his craft on the stage, Shin switched gears and joined the theater company Hakchon.

When Shin performed in his first musical Moskito, there were only 20-25 audience members in the 500-seat hall. Despite feeling depressed and frustrated, he said the experience made him strong and helped him become an actor with plenty of guts.

While doing the musical Dracula, Shin was cast in his first substantial onscreen role, in the risqué cable drama Hyena (2006). Supporting roles in dramas and films followed, notably in Thank You (2007) and My Life's Golden Years (also known as All About My Family, 2008). He also appeared on season 1 of the MBC dating reality show We Got Married as a "fake couple" with female comedian Kim Shin-young.

Mainstream breakthrough still eluded Shin, but in theater his star was rising. In 2007, Shin was picked from 400 auditionees for the lead role Solomon in Dancing Shadows, a musical adaptation of the realist play Forest Fire by celebrated Korean playwright Cha Beom-seok. He later received a Best New Actor nomination from the Korea Musical Awards.

As Shin starred in one hit musical after another, he continued to impress critics with his acting performances, his strong and powerful baritone vocals and his delicate and clear alto notes. He is now considered a top musical star, even drawing fans from outside Korea to his shows.

Definitely Neighbors (2010) further boosted his TV profile; for his role as a difficult chef who falls in love with an older divorcee, Shin won Best Supporting Actor in a Weekend/Daily Drama at the 2010 SBS Drama Awards. His most popular drama yet was the romantic comedy My Love from the Star (2013), in which he appeared as a villainous businessman. This was followed by supporting roles in the 2014 series Lovers of Music (as a talent agency CEO), Liar Game (as the host of a reality show), and The King's Face (as a face reader).

Despite branching out to film and television, Shin has maintained that his heart will always belong to the stage, and has stated, "I feel more affection toward the stage [rather than TV]. I think it is the stage where actors learn life and understand the meaning of acting. It is where I learned how to act and where I gained confidence. I think the core of my life will remain on the stage" (The Korea Herald, 2007). "The musical is like my old home and it made me what I am now, so I can't stop performing the musicals however busy I get" (The Korea Times, 2009)

In September 2021, Shin decided not to renew his contract with HB Entertainment. Later on September 27, 2021, Shin signed a contract with Screening ENT. After his contract with Sangyeong ENT ended in December 2023, Shin signed a contract with Y1 Entertainment on January 9, 2025.

== Personal life ==
Shin has a younger brother. Shin Jae-rok is a former professional basketball player who had short stints with Anyang KT&G Kites and Changwon LG Sakers before retiring. He became a chef and has since opened his own restaurant. Both of them appeared on KBS talk show Happy Together on July 30, 2015.

=== Relationships ===
Shin began dating ballerina Kim Joo-won in 2011; Kim was a principal dancer with the Korea National Ballet for 15 years from 1988 to 2003, and currently teaches at Sungshin Women's University. The pair broke up after four years of dating in August 2015.

In June 2016, Shin married a non-celebrity office worker in Hawaii. In November the same year, Shin became a father to a daughter.

== Filmography ==
=== Television series ===
Year	Title	Role	Ref.
2002	Shoot for the Stars		
2003	Heungbu's Good Luck		
2006	Hyena	Lee Seok-jin	
2007	Thank You	Choi Seok-hyun	
2007	Drama City: "I'm a Very Special Lover"	Lee Jin-ho	
2008	The Art of Seduction	Hyun-soo	
2008	One Mom and Three Dads	Na Hwang Kyung-tae	
2008	My Life's Golden Age	Go Kyung-woo	
2010	Definitely Neighbors	Jang Gun-hee	
2013	My Love from the Star	Lee Jae-kyung	
2014	Lovers of Music	Jo Geun-woo	
2014	Liar Game	Kang Do-young	
2014	The King's Face	Kim Do-chi	
2016	On the Way to the Airport	Park Jin-suk	
2017	Man Who Dies to Live	Kang Ho-rim	
2018	Return	Oh Tae-seok	
2018–2019	The Last Empress	Lee Hyuk	
2019	Vagabond	Gi Tae-woong	
2019	Perfume	Seo Yi-do	
2020	Kairos	Kim Seo-jin	
2022	Doctor Lawyer	Jayden Lee	
2024	The Judge from Hell	Bael (Special appearances)	

=== Film ===
Year	Title	Role	Ref.
2005	All for Love	Basketball player	
2007	The Worst Guy Ever	Kwon Jae-hoon	
2008	Lovers of Six Years	Lee Jin-sung	
2010	Bloody Innocent	Dong-shik	
2010	Finding Mr. Destiny	Captain Choi (cameo)	
2011	The Story of My Life	Sung-rok	
2011	Pitch High	Kang Dae-hyun (cameo)	
2016	The Age of Shadows	Jo Hwe-ryung	
2017	The Prison	Chang-gil	

=== Television shows ===
Year	Title	Role	Notes	Ref.
2009	We Got Married Season 1	Cast	With Kim Shin-young (Ep. 42, 45-54)	
2020	Double Casting	Host		
2020–2021	Master in the House	Cast Member	Ep. 102–177	
2022	OCine	Host		

== Stage ==
=== Musical ===
Musical play performances
Year	Title		Role	Theater	Date	Ref.
Year	English	Korean	Role	Theater	Date	Ref.
2004–2005	Moskito	모스키토	Voter	Baekam Art Hall in Samseong-dong, Gangnam-gu, Seoul	September 29 – February 6, 2005	
2004–2008	Passion of the Rain	사랑은 비를 타고	Dong-hyun	Hanseong Art Hall 2	December 3, 2004 – June 13, 2008	
2006	Kim Jong-wook	김종욱 찾기	Kim Jong Wook & First Love	JTN Art Hall 1	December 12, 2006 – April 8, 2007	
2006	Dracula	드라큘라	Count Dracula	Hanjeon Art Center	April 22, 2006 – July 9, 2006	
2006	Passion of the Rain	패션 오브 더 레인	Dong-hyun	Universal Art Center	December 29, 2006 – December 31, 2006	
2007	Mismatched Lover	실연남녀	Kang Yeon-oh	The Good Theater	January 8, 2008 – March 30, 2008	
2007	Dancing Shadow	댄싱 섀도우	Solomon	Seoul Arts Center Opera Theater	July 8, 2007 – August 26, 2007	
2007	Mismatched Lover	실연남녀	Kang Yeon-oh	Daehakro T.M. 1	October 13, 2007 – December 9, 2007	
2007	Finding Kim Jong Wook	김종욱 찾기	Kim Jong Wook & First Love	JTN Art Hall 1	October 23, 2007 – February 17, 2013	
2008	Mismatched Lover - Busan	실연남녀 - 부산	Kang Yeon-oh	Busan Cultural Center Chungmu Theater	June 14, 2008 – June 15, 2008	
2008	Fiddler on the Roof	지붕위의 바이올린	Percy	National Theater Haewolim Theater	November 21, 2008 – December 28, 2008	
2009	My Scary Girl	마이 스케어리 걸	Hwang Dae-woo	Chungmu Art Center Main Theater	March 6, 2009 – May 17, 2009	
2009	My Scary Girl	마이 스케어리 걸	Hwang Dae-woo	The Stage	May 30, 2009 – July 19, 2009	
2009	Roméo et Juliette	로미오 앤 줄리엣	Romeo	Seoul Arts Center Opera Theater	July 4, 2009 – August 2, 2009	
2009	My Scary Girl - Daejeon	마이 스케어리 걸 - 대전		Chungnam National University Cultural Center, Jeongsimhwa Hall	September 19, 2009 – September 20, 2009	
2009–2010	Jack the Ripper	살인마 잭	Daniel	Universal Art Center	November 13, 2009 – January 31, 2010	
2010	Monte Cristo	몬테크리스토	Edmond Dantès / Monte Cristo	Universal Art Centre	April 21, 2010 – June 13, 2010	
2010	Monte Cristo	몬테크리스토	Edmond Dantès / Monte Cristo	Daegu Arts Center	June 22, 2010 – June 27, 2010	
2010	Monte Cristo	몬테크리스토	Edmond Dantès / Monte Cristo	Gwangju Cultural Center, Daeguk Hall	July 16, 2010 – July 18, 2010	
2010	Monte Cristo	몬테크리스토	Edmond Dantès / Monte Cristo	Busan Citizens' Hall, Main Theater	August 6, 2010 – August 8, 2010	
2010	The Story of My Life	스토리 오브 마이 라이프	Thomas Weaver	Dongsoong Art Center, Dongsoong Hall	July 10, 2010 – September 19, 2010	
2010	Tick, Tick... Boom!	틱틱붐	Jon	Chungmu Art Center Main Theater, Black	September 30, 2010 – November 7, 2010	
2010	Hero	영웅	An Jung-geun	National Theater, Haorum Theater	December 4, 2010 – January 15, 2011	
2011	Hero	영웅	An Jung-geun	Daejeon Arts Center, Art Hall	January 21, 2011 – January 22, 2011	
2011	Hero	영웅	An Jung-geun	Ansan Culture and Arts Center, Sunrise Theater	January 29, 2011 – January 30, 2011	
2011	Monte Cristo	몬테크리스토	Edmond Dantès / Count of Monte Cristo	Chungmu Art Center Main Theater, Black	March 1, 2011 – April 24, 2011	
2011	Monte Cristo	몬테크리스토	Edmond Dantès / Count of Monte Cristo	Daejeon Arts Center, Art Hall	April 29, 2011 – May 1, 2011	
2011	Monte Cristo	몬테크리스토	Edmond Dantès / Count of Monte Cristo	Korea Sound Culture Hall, Chamber Hall, Jeonju	May 14, 2011 – May 15, 2011	
2011	Monte Cristo	몬테크리스토	Edmond Dantès / Count of Monte Cristo	Gwangju Cultural Center, Main Theater	May 21, 2011 – May 22, 2011	
2011	Monte Cristo	몬테크리스토	Edmond Dantès / Count of Monte Cristo	Gyeonggi Arts Center, Main Theater, Suwon	June 4, 2011 – June 5, 2011	
2011	Monte Cristo	몬테크리스토	Edmond Dantès / Count of Monte Cristo	Busan Cultural Center, Main Theater	June 10, 2011 – June 12, 2011	
2011	Monte Cristo	몬테크리스토	Edmond Dantès / Count of Monte Cristo	Mokpo Citizens' Culture and Sports Center, Main Theater	July 2, 2011 – July 3, 2011	
2011	Monte Cristo	몬테크리스토	Edmond Dantès / Count of Monte Cristo	Jeju Art Center	July 8, 2011 – July 10, 2011	
2013– 2014	Carmen	카르멘	Don José	LG Art Centre	December 3, 2013 — February 3, 2014	
2014	Le Roi Soleil	태양왕	Louis XIV	Blue Square Shinhan Card Hall	April 8, 2014 – June 1, 2014	
2014	Le Roi Soleil	태양왕	Louis XIV	Gimhae Cultural Center, Maru Hall	June 7, 2014 – June 8, 2014	
2014	Le Roi Soleil	태양왕	Louis XIV	Daegu Kyemyung Art Center	June 14, 2014 – June 15, 2014	
2014	Le Roi Soleil	태양왕	Louis XIV	Gwangju Cultural Center, Main Theater	June 21, 2014 – June 22, 2014	
2014	Le Roi Soleil	태양왕	Louis XIV	Daejeon Arts Center, Art Hall	June 28, 2014 – June 29, 2014	
2014	Le Roi Soleil	태양왕	Louis XIV	Goyang Aram Nuri Aram Theater	July 18, 2014 – July 20, 2014	
2015	Elisabeth	엘리자벳	Death	Blue Square Shinhan Card Hall	June 13, 2015 – September 6, 2015	
2015	Elisabeth	엘리자벳	Death	Daegu Kyemyung Art Center	September 17, 2015 – September 20, 2015	
2015	Elisabeth	엘리자벳	Death	Changwon Seongsan Art Hall, Main Theater	October 3, 2015 – October 4, 2015	
2015	Elisabeth	엘리자벳	Death	Daejeon Arts Center, Art Hall	October 10, 2015 – October 11, 2015	
2015	Elisabeth	엘리자벳	Death	Gyeonggi Arts Center, Main Theater, Suwon	October 17, 2015 – October 18, 2015	
2016	Mata Hari	마타하리	Colonel Ladoux	Blue Square Shinhan Card Hall	March 25, 2016 – June 12, 2016	
2016	Daddy Long Legs	키다리 아저씨	Jervis Pendleton	Yes24 Stage 1 Hall	July 19, 2016 – October 3, 2016	
2016	Monte Cristo	몬테크리스토	Edmund Dantes/The Count of Monte Cristo	Chungmu Art Center, Main Theater	November 19, 2016 – February 12, 2017	
2017	Monte Cristo	몬테크리스토	Edmund Dantes/The Count of Monte Cristo	Jeju Art Center	February 24, 2017 – February 26, 2017	
2017	Monte Cristo	몬테크리스토	Edmund Dantes/The Count of Monte Cristo	Korea Sound Culture Hall, Chamber Hall	March 10, 2017 – March 11, 2017	
2017	Monte Cristo	몬테크리스토	Edmund Dantes/The Count of Monte Cristo	Cheonan Arts Center, Main Theater	March 17, 2017 – March 19, 2017	
2017	Monte Cristo	몬테크리스토	Edmund Dantes/The Count of Monte Cristo	Ulsan Culture and Arts Center, Main Theater	March 24, 2017 – March 26, 2017	
2017	Monte Cristo	몬테크리스토	Edmund Dantes/The Count of Monte Cristo	Changwon Seongsan Art Hall, Main Theater	March 31, 2017 – April 2, 2017	
2017	Monte Cristo	몬테크리스토	Edmund Dantes/The Count of Monte Cristo	Gyeonggi Arts Center, Main Theater	April 14, 2017 – April 16, 2017	
2017	Monte Cristo	몬테크리스토	Edmund Dantes/The Count of Monte Cristo	Gwangju Culture and Arts Center, Main Theater	April 21, 2017 – April 23, 2017	
2017	Monte Cristo	몬테크리스토	Edmund Dantes/The Count of Monte Cristo	Icheon Art Hall, Main Theater	April 28, 2017 – April 30, 2017	
2017	Monte Cristo	몬테크리스토	Edmund Dantes/The Count of Monte Cristo	Busan Citizen's Hall, Main Theater	May 12, 2017 – May 14, 2017	
2017	Daddy Long Legs	키다리 아저씨	Jarvis Pendleton	Yes24 Stage 1	May 16, 2017 – July 23, 2017	
2017	Monte Cristo	몬테크리스토	Edmond Dantes/The Count of Monte Cristo	Incheon Culture & Arts Center Grand Theater	May 19, 2017 – May 21, 2017	
2017	Monte Cristo	몬테크리스토	Edmond Dantes/The Count of Monte Cristo	Ansan Culture & Arts Center Sunrise Theater	May 26, 2017 – May 28, 2017	
2017	Monte Cristo	몬테크리스토	Edmond Dantes/The Count of Monte Cristo	Daegu Keimyung Arts Center	June 2, 2017 – June 4, 2017	
2017	Monte Cristo	몬테크리스토	Edmond Dantes/The Count of Monte Cristo	Daejeon Arts Center Art Hall	June 9, 2017 – June 11, 2017	
2017	Daddy Long Legs	키다리 아저씨	Jarvis Pendleton	Daegu Bongsan Cultural Center Grand Theater (Gaon Hall)	August 18, 2017 – September 3, 2017	
2017–2018	Sandglass	모래시계	Park Tae-soo	Chungmu Art Center Main Theater	December 5, 2017 – February 11, 2018	
2018	The Devotion of Suspect X	용의자 X의 헌신	Yukawa	Yes24 Stage 1	May 15, 2018 – August 12, 2018	
2018	Daddy Long Legs	키다리 아저씨	Jarvis Pendleton	Baekam Art Hall	August 31, 2018 – November 18, 2018	
2019	Daddy Long Legs	키다리 아저씨	Jarvis Pendleton	Daehakro Dream Art Center 1	October 15, 2019 – January 1, 2020	
2019-2020	Rebecca	레베카	Maxim de Winter	Chungmu Art Center, Main Theater	November 16, 2019 – March 15, 2020	
2020	Rebecca	레베카	Maxim de Winter	Gimhae Cultural Center, Maru Hall	May 22, 2020 – May 24, 2020	
2020	Rebecca	레베카	Maxim de Winter	Busan Dream Theater	May 29, 2020 – May 31, 2020	
2020	Rebecca	레베카	Maxim de Winter	Gwangju Cultural Center (formerly Gwangju Cultural and Art Center)	June 5, 2020 – June 7, 2020	
2020-2021	Monte Cristo	몬테크리스토	Edmond Dantes/Monte Cristo	LG Art Center	November 17, 2020 – March 28, 2021	
2021	The Dracula	드라큘라	Dracula	Blue Square Shinhan Card Hall	May 20, 2021 – August 1, 2021	
2021-2022	Jekyll & Hyde	지킬 앤 하이드	Jekyll/Hyde	Charlotte Theater	October 19, 2021 – May 8, 2022	
2022	Jekyll & Hyde	지킬 앤 하이드	Jekyll/Hyde	Cheonan Arts Center, Grand Theater	July 15, 2022 – July 17, 2022	
2022	Jekyll & Hyde	지킬 앤 하이드	Jekyll/Hyde	Gyeongnam Cultural and Arts Center, Grand Theater, Jinju	July 22, 2022 – July 24, 2022	
2022	Jekyll & Hyde	지킬 앤 하이드	Jekyll/Hyde	Seongnam Arts Center, Opera House	July 29, 2022 – July 31, 2022	
2022	Jekyll & Hyde	지킬 앤 하이드	Jekyll/Hyde	Ulsan Culture & Arts Center, Main Hall	August 5, 2022 – August 7, 2022	
2022	Jekyll & Hyde	지킬 앤 하이드	Jekyll/Hyde	GS Caltex Yeoulmaru Grand Theater, Yeosu	August 12, 2022 – August 14, 2022	
2022	Elisabeth das Musical	엘리자벳 - 부산	Death	Blue Square Shinhan Card Hall	August 30, 2022 – November 13, 2022	
2022	Elisabeth das Musical	엘리자벳 - 부산	Death	Busan Dream Theater	November 22, 2022 – November 27, 2022	
2022	Sweeney Todd	스위니토드	Sweeney Todd	Charlotte Theater	December 1, 2022 – March 5, 2023	
2023	Ben-Hur	벤허	Ben-Hur	LG Art Center, Seoul LG SIGNATURE Hall	September 2, 2023 – November 19, 2023	
2023	Dracula	드라큘라	Dracula	Charlotte Theater	December 6, 2023 – March 3, 2024	
2024	Pagwa	파과	Tu-woo (Bullfighting)	Hongik University Daehangno Art Center, Grand Theater	March 15, 2024 – May 26, 2024	
2024	Dracula - Daejeon	드라큘라 - 대전	Dracula	Daejeon Arts Center, Art Hall	March 20, 2024 – March 24, 2024	
2024	Dracula - Busan	드라큘라 - 부산	Dracula	Busan Cultural Center, Grand Theater	April 2, 2024 – April 7, 2024	
2024	Frankenstein - 10th Anniversary	프랑켄슈타인 - 10주년	Victor Frankenstein/Jack	Blue Square Shinhan Card Hall	June 5, 2024 – August 25, 2024	

=== Theater ===
Theater play performances
Year	Title		Role	Theater	Date	Ref.
Year	English	Korean	Role	Theater	Date	Ref.
2007	Hamlet	햄릿	Prince Hamlet	Universal Art Center	October 12, 2007 – November 11, 2007	
2013	Closer	클로저	Dan	Art One Theatre 1	August 31, 2013 – December 1, 2013	

== Awards and nominations ==
Year	Award	Category	Nominated work	Result	Ref.
2007	13th Korea Musical Awards	Best New Actor	Dancing Shadows	Nominated	
2008	MBC Drama Awards	Best New Actor	My Life's Golden Age	Nominated	
2010	SBS Drama Awards	Best Supporting Actor in a Weekend/Daily Drama	Definitely Neighbors	Won	
2014	7th Korea Drama Awards	Hot Star Award	My Love from the Star	Won	
2014	3rd APAN Star Awards	Best Supporting Actor	My Love from the Star	Nominated	
2014	22nd Korea Culture and Entertainment Awards	Excellence Award, Actor in a Drama	My Love from the Star	Won	
2014	SBS Drama Awards	Excellence Award, Actor in a Drama Special	My Love from the Star	Won	
2014	KBS Drama Awards	Best Supporting Actor	Lovers of Music and The King's Face	Won	
2017	MBC Drama Awards	Excellence Award, Actor in a Miniseries	Man Who Dies to Live	Won	
2018	SBS Drama Awards	Top Excellence Award, Actor in a Wednesday-Thursday Drama	The Last Empress	Won	
2018	SBS Drama Awards	Best Character	Return	Won	
2019	12th Korea Drama Awards	Excellence Award, Actor	Perfume	Nominated	
2019	KBS Drama Awards	Excellence Award, Actor in a Miniseries	Perfume	Nominated	
2019	KBS Drama Awards	Netizen Award, Actor	Perfume	Nominated	
2019	KBS Drama Awards	Best Couple Award with Ko Won-hee	Perfume	Nominated	
2019	SBS Drama Awards	Excellence Award, Actor in a Miniseries	Vagabond	Nominated	
2020	SBS Entertainment Awards	Best Entertainer Award	Master in the House	Won	
2020	MBC Drama Awards	Top Excellence Award, Actor in a Monday-Tuesday Miniseries	Kairos	Won	
2020	MBC Drama Awards	Best Couple Award with Lee Se-young	Kairos	Nominated	
2022	MBC Drama Awards	Excellence Award, Actor in a Miniseries	Doctor Lawyer	Nominated	
