= Nam Gyu-ri =

South Korean actress and singer (born 1985)

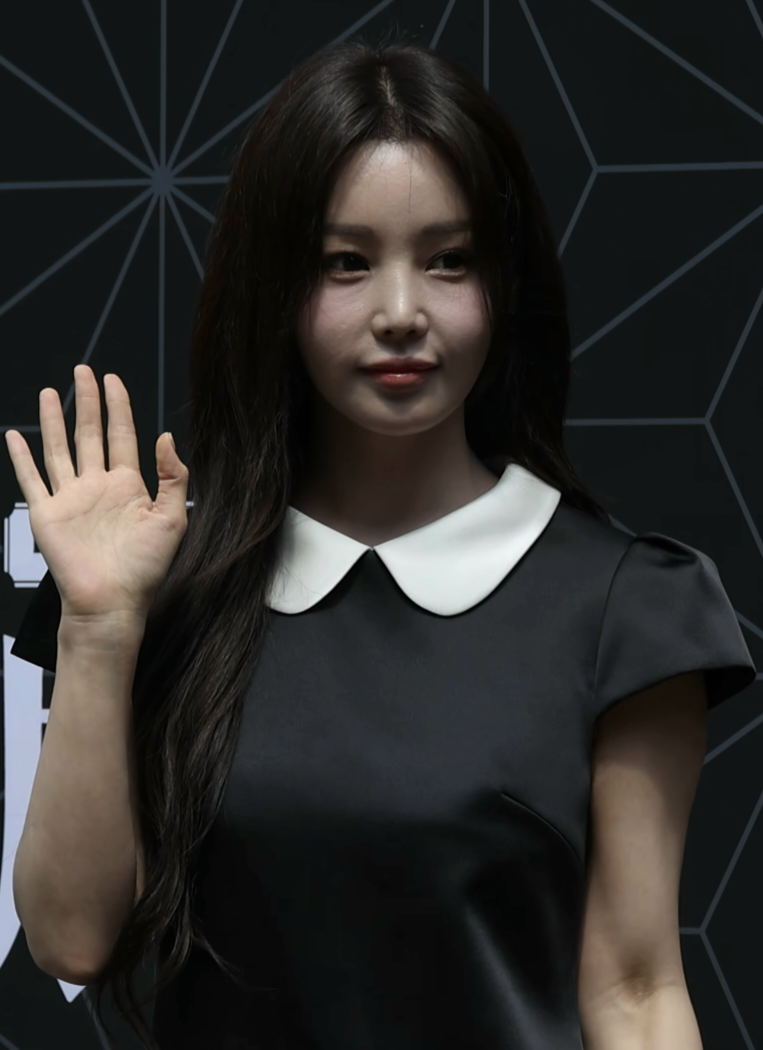
- Nam in June 2026
- Born: Nam Mi-jeong; April 26, 1984 (age 42); Seoul, South Korea
- Education: Kyung Hee University (Department Theater and Film)
- Occupations: Actress; singer
- Years active: 2006–present
- Agent: Higher Rank Entertainment
- Musical career
- Genres: K-pop; R&B
- Labels: Mnet Media; Core Contents Media
- Member of: SeeYa

Korean name
- Hangul: 남규리
- Hanja: 南奎里
- RR: Nam Gyuri
- MR: Nam Kyuri

Former name
- Hangul: 남미정
- Hanja: 南美静
- RR: Nam Mijeong
- MR: Nam Mijŏng

Nam Gyu-ri (Korean: 남규리; born April 26, 1984) is a South Korean actress and singer. She was the leader of the Korean female trio SeeYa. In 2009, Nam Gyu-ri had a contract dispute with the group's management company and left the group. Nam has also acted, most notably in the film Death Bell and the drama 49 Days. On March 12, 2026, she participates in SeeYa's 20th debut anniversary reunion and restarts group activities after nearly 17 years.

== Career ==
Nam was born in Gwanak District, Seoul, South Korea. She graduated from Kyunghee University specializing in Theater and Film (Department of Theater and Film).

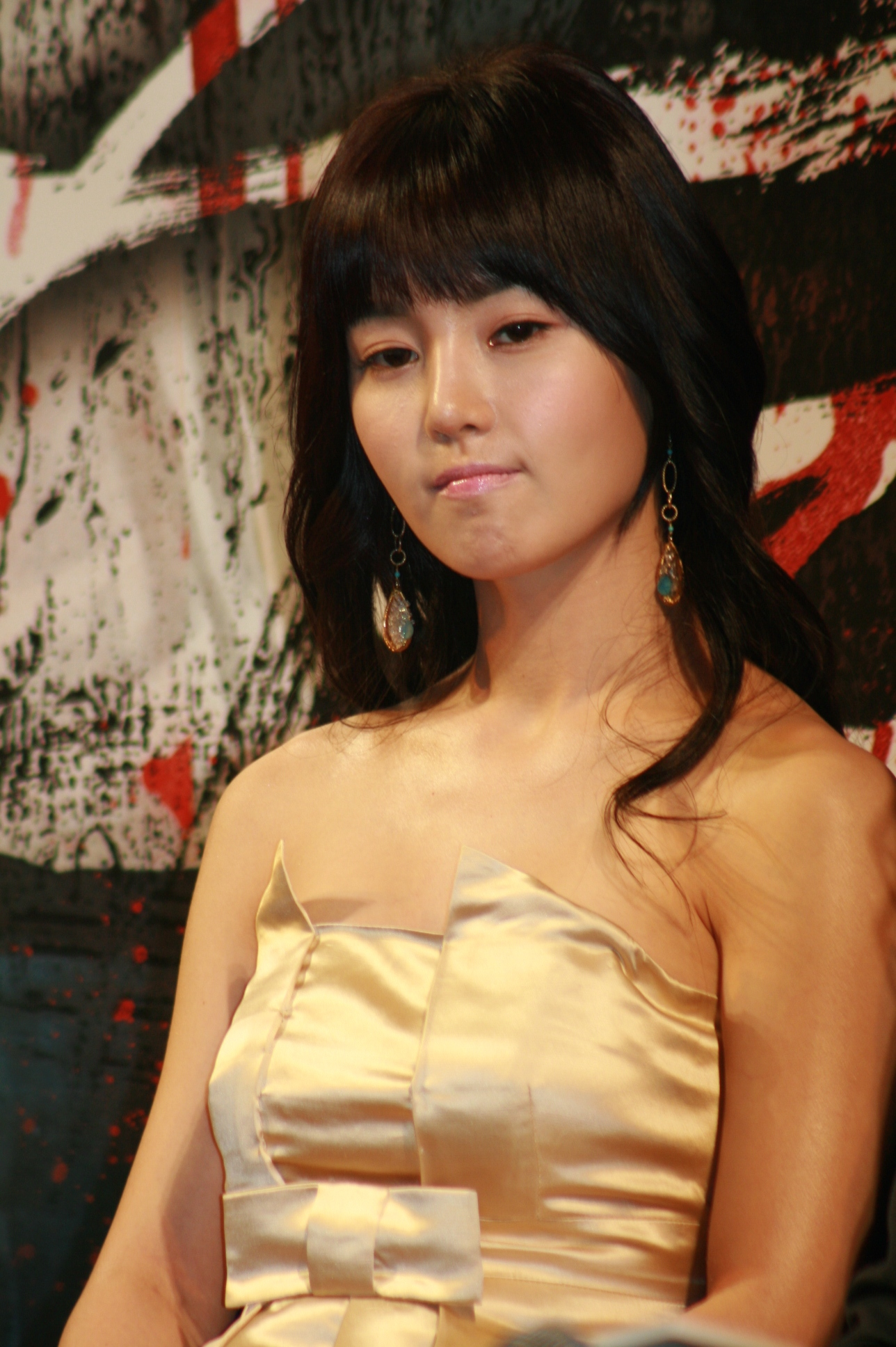
Nam in 2008

In April 2009, Core Contents Media, SeeYa's management company, announced that Nam Gyu-ri had violated the terms of her contract by refusing to perform her engagements as a member of SeeYa; the company also stated that it would potentially take legal action against Nam. Although the company later announced that she would return, it was eventually revealed that the issues could not be fully resolved, and Nam left again. In leaving the group permanently, Nam released a statement through her lawyers in which she said that she "could not possibly" return to SeeYa. In the statement, Nam announced that the reason for her departure was that she was more interested in pursuing an acting career than singing. Because it was impossible to pursue both paths, she had decided that she needed to give up working with the group. For this reason, she declined offers from all record companies that were interested in recruiting SeeYa, and would henceforth make a new beginning as an actor and not a singer.

Shortly after finding new management, however, Nam resumed her singing career as a solo artist. Her new management company, Eyagi Entertainment, has confirmed that Nam would pursue a solo career in both acting and singing. Despite the fact that Nam stated she would not pursue her singing career as a solo singer, she managed to contribute in Ivy's comeback album "I Be.." in 2009.

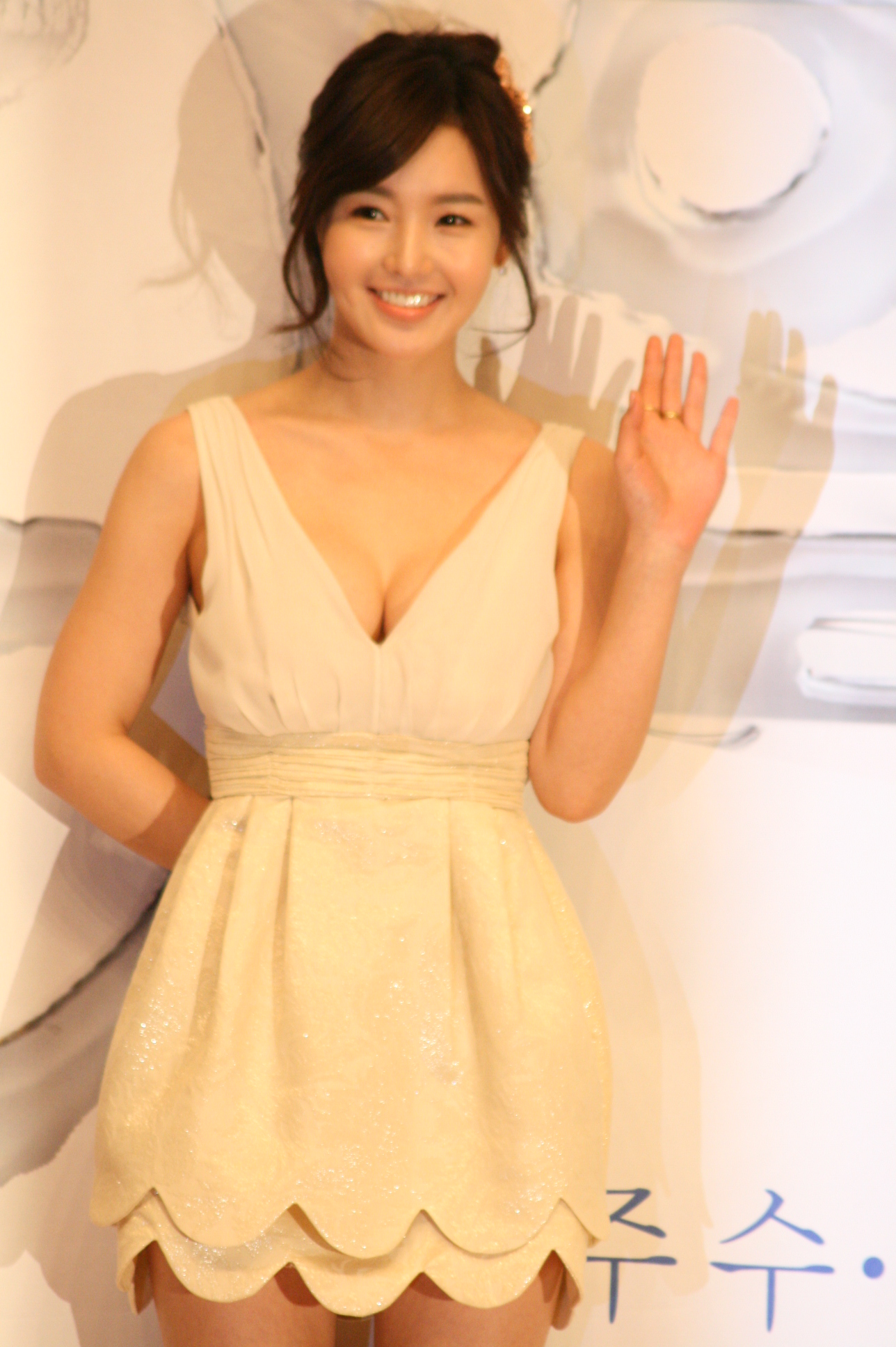
Nam in 2011

In 2011, Nam returned to SeeYa temporarily during the group's promotion of its final album. SeeYa officially disbanded on January 30, 2011.

In 2014, Nam signed with SidusHQ, one of South Korea's most famous talent agencies.

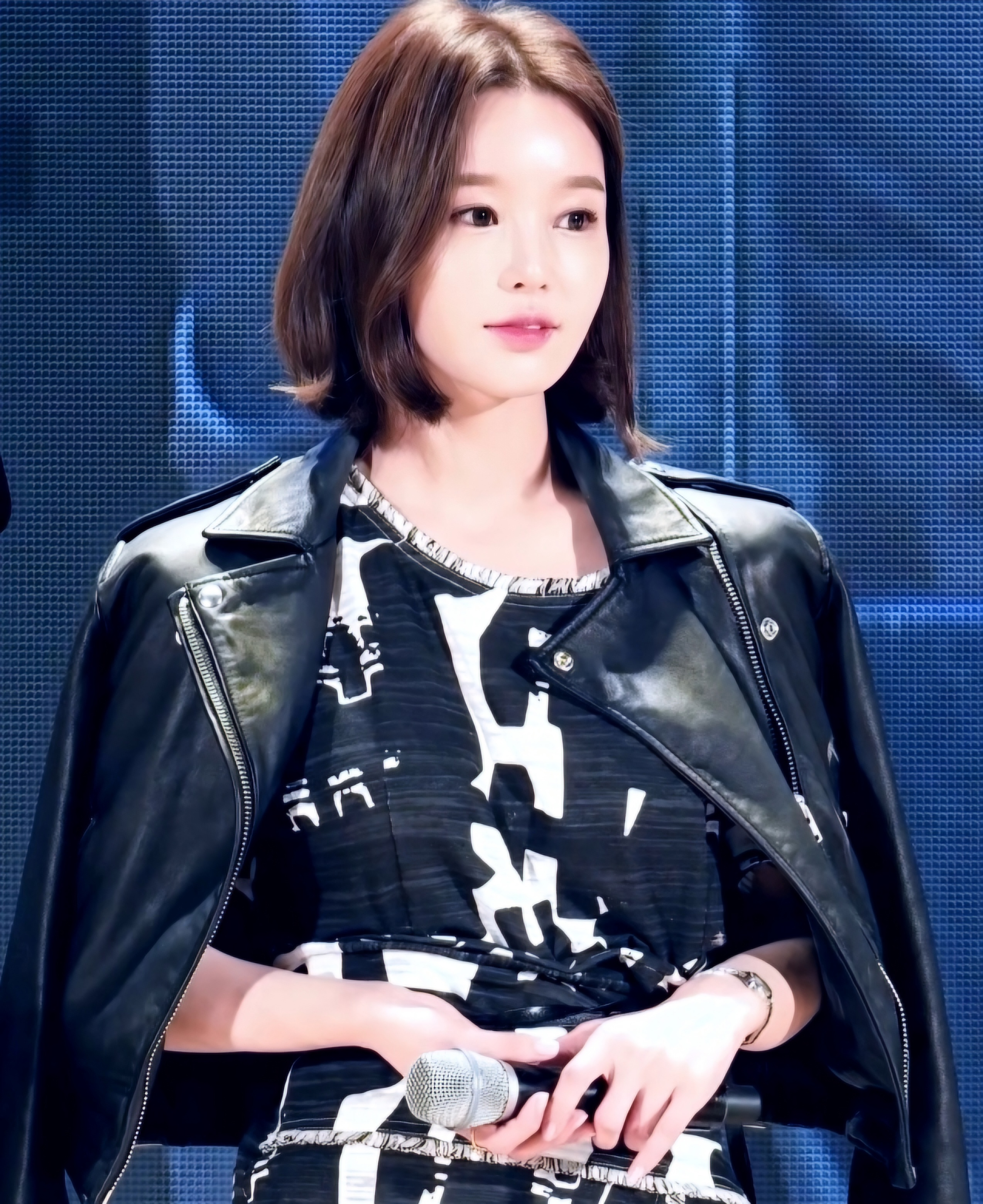
Nam in 2015

In November 2018, Nam signed with new agency KORTOP Media, founded by veteran drama producer Go Dae-hwa.

In 2020, Nam acted as the second lead in Kairos, acting as a violinist and a sociopath who was secretly having an affair behind her husband's back while acting as a good wife and mother. She received favourable reviews for her acting of the villain in the drama.

In May 2022, Nam signed with My Company after her contract with her former agency expired.

In July 2023, Nam signed with new agency Higher Rank Entertainment.

In March 12, 2026, Nam participates in SeeYa's 20th debut anniversary reunion.

== Discography ==
=== Singles ===
Title	Year	Peak chart positions	Album
Title	Year	KOR	Album
"Ride to Me" (내게 오는 자전거) (feat. One Way)	2010	49	Non-album singles
"Starlight Tears" (별빛눈물)	2011	35	Non-album singles
"That Man" (그 남자)	2012	41	Non-album singles
"A Man and Woman Meet for the First Time" (처음 본 남자 그리고 여자) (with Kyeol)	2013	96	Non-album singles
"Moon River"	2014	—	Non-album singles
"Halo"	2024	— (Note: "HALO" did not enter the Circle Digital Chart, but it peaked at number 42 on the component Download Chart.)	Non-album singles
"I'm In Love With You" (고백하는 거 맞아)	2024	— (Note: "I'm In Love With You" did not enter the Circle Digital Chart, but it peaked at number 27 on the component Download Chart.)	Non-album singles
"Love, Unspoken" (가슴앓이)	2025	— (Note: "Love, Unspoken" did not enter the Circle Digital Chart, but it peaked at number 58 on the component Download Chart.)	Non-album singles
"Still, I Like You" (그래도 좋아해요)	2025	— (Note: "Still, I Like You" did not enter the Circle Digital Chart, but it peaked at number 51 on the component Download Chart.)	Non-album singles
"—" denotes releases that did not chart or were not released in that region.

=== Soundtrack appearances ===
Title	Year	Peak chart positions	Album
Title	Year	KOR	Album
"Flying in the Deep Night" (깊은 밤을 날아서)	2007	—	Unstoppable Marriage OST
"Lately I" (요즘 나는) (with Lee Hong-ki)	2007	—	Unstoppable Marriage OST
"Man" (남자)	2008	—	Death Bell OST
"I Wanna See Your Face" (보고싶은 얼굴)	2009	—	More than Blue OST
"Say Love" (사랑한다는 말)	2010	82	Assorted Gems OST
"I Only Look at You" (그대만 보이네요)	2011	83	Mr. Idol OST
"Haeundae Lovers" (해운대 연인들)	2012	—	Haeundae Lovers OST
"Candle in the Rain"	2019	—	Different Dreams OST
"Before Tonight is Over" (이밤이 다하기 전에)	2019	—	Different Dreams OST
Dance Tonight	2019	—	Different Dreams OST
"—" denotes releases that did not chart or were not released in that region.

=== Collaborations ===
Title	Year	Album
"Don't Cheat" (Miss S feat. Nam Gyu-ri)	2008	Non-album single
"Goodbye and Goodbye" (Shin Hye-sung feat. Nam Gyu-ri)	2010	Non-album single

== Filmography ==
=== Film ===
Year	Title	Role	Notes	Ref.
2008	Death Bell	Kang Yi-na		
2009	More Than Blue	Catgirl		
2011	Mr. Idol	Mi-oh	Cameo	
2013	Top Star	Actress in Ice Flower	Cameo	
2014	Mad Sad Bad	Shi-wa	segment: "Saw you"	
2018	Deja Vu	Ji-min		
2018	History of Jealousy	Lee Su-min		

=== Television series ===
Year	Title	Role	Notes	Ref.
2010	Super Star – "Never Ending Love"	Ahn Gyu-ri	Episode 6	
2010	Life Is Beautiful	Yang Cho-rong		
2011	49 Days	Shin Ji-hyun		
2012	KBS Drama Special – "Butcher Barber"	Mi-ja		
2012	Lovers of Haeundae	Yoon Se-na		
2012	Ohlala Couple	Bae Jung-ah	Cameo (Episode 1)	
2013	Heartless City	Yoon Soo-min		
2014	My Forgetful Girlfriend	Xue Jia Bao	Chinese drama	
2014	KBS Drama Special – "House, Mate"	Seo-won		
2015	Late Night Restaurant	Min-kyung	Cameo (Episode 16)	
2016	Yeah, That's How It Is	Lee Na-young		
2018	My Secret Terrius	Choi Eun-kyung	Special appearance	
2018	Children of Nobody	Jeon Soo-young		
2019	Different Dreams	Miki		
2020	Kairos	Kang Hyun-chae		
2021	Drama Stage – "The Fair"	Ryu Hee-sun	Season 4	
2021	You Are My Spring	Ahn Ga-young		
2023–2024	The Story of Park's Marriage Contract	Yoon-hee	Special appearance	
2024	My Military Valentine	Baek Young-ok		

=== Web series ===
Year	Title	Role	Ref.
2017	Swan	Kim Min-seo	
2017	Hey Anna! Let's Eat!	Anna	

=== Television shows ===
Year	Title	Role	Notes	Ref.
2013	Burundi, Small Hope for the Six Brothers and Sisters	Narrator		
2015	Law of the Jungle	Cast member		

=== Music video appearances ===
Year	Song title	Artist	Ref.
2006	"Love Song"	SG Wannabe	
2008	"Don't Cheat On Me"	Miss S	
2011	"Ran into You By Chance"	Led Apple	
2013	" If This Ain't Love"	Verbal Jint feat. Ailee	

== Awards and nominations ==
Name of the award ceremony, year presented, category, nominee of the award, and the result of the nomination
Award ceremony	Year	Category	Nominee / Work	Result	Ref.
Baeksang Arts Awards	2011	Best New Actress – Television	Life Is Beautiful	Nominated	
Buil Film Awards	2008	Best New Actress	Death Bell	Nominated	
MBC Drama Awards	2018	Excellence Award, Actress in a Wednesday-Thursday Miniseries	Children of Nobody	Nominated	
MBC Drama Awards	2019	Excellence Award, Actress in a Monday-Tuesday Miniseries	Different Dreams	Nominated	
MBC Drama Awards	2020	Excellence Award, Actress in a Monday-Tuesday Miniseries	Kairos	Won	
SBS Drama Awards	2010	New Star Award	Life Is Beautiful	Won	
SBS Drama Awards	2011	Excellence Award, Actress in a Drama Special	49 Days	Nominated	
