= 49 Days =

2011 South Korean television series

- Promotional poster for 49 Days
- Also known as: Pure Love
- Hangul: 49일
- Hanja: 49日
- RR: 49il
- MR: 49il
- Genre: Romance; Melodrama; Fantasy; Body swap
- Written by: So Hyun-kyung
- Directed by: Jo Young-kwang
- Starring: Lee Yo-won; Nam Gyu-ri; Jung Il-woo; Jo Hyun-jae; Bae Soo-bin; Seo Ji-hye
- Opening theme: "I Can Feel It" by Navi
- Country of origin: South Korea
- Original language: Korean
- No. of episodes: 20

Production
- Producer: Choi Moon-suk
- Production location: South Korea
- Running time: 70 minutes
- Production company: HB Entertainment

Original release
- Network: SBS TV
- Release: March 16 – May 19, 2011

Related
- Pure Love (Philippine adaptation)

49 Days (Korean: 49일; RR: 49il) is a 2011 South Korean television series starring Lee Yo-won, Nam Gyu-ri, Jo Hyun-jae, Bae Soo-bin, Jung Il-woo, and Seo Ji-hye. It aired on SBS from March 16 to May 19, 2011 on Wednesdays and Thursdays at 21:55 (KST) for 20 episodes.

== Synopsis ==
Gullible yet cheerful Shin Ji-hyun (Nam Gyu-ri) is living a perfect life: she is the only daughter of wealthy, doting parents and is surrounded by supportive best friends. She is also engaged to be married to the perfect man, Kang Min-ho (Bae Soo-bin), in just a few weeks. Meanwhile, Song Yi-kyung (Lee Yo-won) is in an existential crisis following her boyfriend's tragic death. She works third shift at a convenience store, sleeps in the afternoon, and often spends what little time she has left in the day contemplating suicide.

One fateful day interweaves the two characters' stories as Yi-kyung attempts to kill herself by walking into oncoming traffic. A bystander saves Yi-kyung by pulling her out of harm's way. However, a massive pile-up ensues from her actions. Ji-hyun fails to hit the brakes as she approaches the collision site and crashes into a truck. When she regains consciousness after the accident, she shockingly finds that she could neither make physical contact with the people crowding around her car nor could any of them hear her protests. She also sees her own body being carted into an ambulance. A motorcyclist nearby seems to be the only person who can see her. After Ji-hyun leaves him to follow the paramedics attempting to revive her body in the ambulance, she meets the cyclist again at the hospital. The cyclist reveals to her that he is indeed the "Scheduler," an angelic being charged with guiding souls to their final destinations. He explains that since it was not yet her time to die, she is given the chance to recover from her comatose state and live again. The offer is contingent, however, on the completion of a mission: Ji-hyun must gather three teardrops shed out of pure love by three people not related to her by blood within the next 49 days. Elated by the seemingly easy task, Ji-hyun immediately thinks of her fiancé and two best friends and is certain she will live again. She then finds herself in the body of the suicidal Yi-kyung for which she will remain for the duration of her quest.

Ji-hyun proceeds by seeking employment as a waitress at a restaurant owned by her high school friend, Han Kang (Jo Hyun-jae). While in the process of obtaining her proof of employment at a hotel where the real Yi-kyung worked, Ji-hyun's memory begins to return to her. Before the accident, Ji-hyun had agreed to meet up with her best friend Shin In-jung (Seo Ji-hye) to show her the bridesmaid dress Ji-hyun had chosen for her. Ji-hyun's excitement is muted when she makes a significant discovery that reveals the deception around her. She painfully realizes her life was less than perfect, and that it won't be as easy to find people who truly love her.

== Cast ==
=== Main ===
- Lee Yo-won as Song Yi-kyung / Shin Ji-hyun (possessed) / Shin Ji-min
  - Kim Hyun-soo as young Ji-min

A despondent night-shift worker who lives in a run-down apartment alone. Yi-kyung is shown to be stoic and chronically depressed, with no interest whatsoever in living after her boyfriend's death. She partly contributes to Ji-hyun's fatal traffic accident as she unsuccessfully tries to end her life, one of many attempts. She develops a bond with Ji-hyun and rediscovers the strength to go on living from that friendship and after moving on from her tragic past. She was later revealed to be Ji-hyun's lost sister, Ji-min, but Ji-hyun had no memory of Yi-kyung before her disappearance and died without knowing the truth, which was only revealed after her death.

- Nam Gyu-ri as Shin Ji-hyun
  - Kim Yoo-bin as young Shin Ji-hyun

A beautiful, pampered yet kind bride-to-be. From the start of the series, Ji-hyun evinces deep feelings for her seemingly perfect fiancé, and strong attachment to her friends. She is nicknamed "Optimistic Princess" by her friends because she was known to view situations through rose-colored glasses prior to the accident. Throughout the drama, Ji-hyun develops the most as a character. While she gradually learns to accept the harsh realities of life, she is still able to maintain her faith in the goodness of others. Eventually, Ji-hyun managed to collect the tears of three people who truly loved her right before the end of her 49-day journey and awaken from her coma, but she died six days after regaining consciousness as her death happened to be predestined to occur around 55 days after the day of her accident. Despite knowing she will die shortly after she awakened, she nevertheless welcomed death and spent the remaining days of her life meaningfully with Han Kang and her family before dying peacefully as the old Ji-hyun who was optimistic prior to her 49-day journey.

- Jung Il-woo as Scheduler / Song Yi-soo

A happy-go-lucky guy who has been working as the Scheduler for almost 5 years. He does not retain any memories of his past; thus, he rarely evinces any sympathy towards humans. Nevertheless, after meeting the troublesome 49-day traveler Shin Ji-hyun, his perspective has changed; he even violated a few rules pertaining to his duty as a grim reaper to help her myriads of times. He is later revealed to be Yi-kyung's deceased boyfriend, Song Yi-soo, and volunteered to be a Scheduler to realize his final wish.

- Jo Hyun-jae as Han Kang

One of Ji-hyun's friends in high school, although they are no longer as close as before due to an unfortunate incident. Han Kang puts up the facade of being cold and rude towards Ji-hyun although in reality, he deeply cares for her. The depth of his feelings for her is revealed in such a way that he knows more about her than her own fiancé and friends. He is Ji-hyun's pillar of support throughout her 49-day journey. He is the first to shed a tear out of pure love for Ji-hyun, and also the first of Ji-hyun's acquaintances to realise that Song Yi-kyung, whose behaviour and personality remarkably resembled Ji-hyun (as Yi-kyung was possessed by Ji-hyun), is actually Ji-hyun in disguise.

- Bae Soo-bin as Kang Min-ho

Ji-hyun's seemingly perfect fiancé who possesses good looks and admirable talent. Min-ho initially showed strong romantic feelings towards Ji-hyun as he was apparently emotionally shattered upon receiving tragic news of her accident. Nevertheless, his manipulative and malicious nature is later revealed in his efforts to defraud Ji-hyun's family. He was later sent to jail for his crimes, and he gradually realised the error of his ways while serving his sentence.

- Seo Ji-hye as Shin In-jung

One of Ji-hyun's best friends. In-jung is first shown as the dependable friend. However, her altruistic image as the 'caring and trustworthy best friend' veils the envy and deep resentment she harbors against Ji-hyun and her family. This resentment blinded her from realising her true affections for Ji-hyun that she eventually felt regret and later shed a tear out of pure love for Ji-hyun while crying over her past actions, which effectively allowed Ji-hyun to accomplish the purpose of her 49-day journey and awaken from her coma.

=== Supporting ===
- Choi Jung-woo as Shin Il-shik, Ji-hyun's father
- Yu Ji-in as Jung Mi-ok, Ji-hyun's mother
- Bae Geu-rin as Park Seo-woo, Ji-hyun's close friend who later shed a tear out of pure love for Ji-hyun
- Son Byong-ho as Oh Hae-won
- Moon Hee-kyung as Bang Hwa-joon
- Kang Sung-min as Noh Kyung-bin, a doctor who stalks Song Yi Kyung. He is the one who saved the latter from accident where Shin Ji Hyun is one of the victims. He offered medical help to Yi Kyung by doing some tests.
- Yoon Bong-gil as Cha Jin-young
- Kim Ho-chang as Ki Joon-hee
- Jin Ye-sol as Ma Soon-jung
- Lee Jong-park as Go Mi-jin

=== Special appearances ===
- Ban Hyo-jung as Senior Scheduler
- Kim Hyung-bum as Another 49 days traveler (Ep. 15)
- Jung Da-hye
- Jo Young-jin
- Goo Seung-hyun as Little kid
- Kim Min-jwa

== Religious themes ==
49 Days explores interconnectedness of all things, such as fate, exorcism, and other spiritual topics. This TV series was inspired by the Korean Shaman concept of "Bardo," which holds that a soul usually wanders the earth for 49 days and then moves on to the next life. Thus the show frequently references relevant Buddhist (once a majority religion of Korea) ideas such as reincarnation and karma. Location names also borrow from theological ideas — as seen from Han Kang's restaurant "헤븐" (Heaven) and "운명산" (Mountain Destiny), where Ji-hyun and Min-ho first meet. However, Christian themes like true love, forgiveness, resurrection, loving one's enemy, and the quantity of three (reminiscent of the Trinity) are central to Ji-hyun's obtaining of the genuine tears. These themes are recurrently exploited throughout the drama under the manifestation of the relationships of the characters. When Ji-hyun asks whether the Scheduler is male, he answers that such gendered distinctions are not practiced in the afterworld, a concept in Matthew 22:30. The Scheduler also quotes Matthew 7:7, when he says, "Knock and the door will be opened to you." The "천기누설" (unutterable secret of the heavens) that Scheduler speaks about is similar to the mysteries of the kingdom of God that "man is not permitted to tell" (2 Corinthians 12:4, Mark 4:11, Matthew 13:11). When Ji-hyun desperately prays to God to save her, her tear necklace attains Han Kang's tear. Her droplet-shaped pendant may be a reference to the tear-collecting bottle that God has in Psalm 56:8. Ji-hyun's last name, Shin (신), means "God" in Korean.

== Ratings ==
Date	Episode	Nationwide	Seoul
2011-03-16	01	8.1% (18th)	9.5% (15th)
2011-03-17	02	8.0%	9.5% (12th)
2011-03-23	03	8.8% (16th)	10.7% (9th)
2011-03-24	04	10.2% (14th)	12.2% (9th)
2011-03-30	05	10.2% (9th)	13.2% (5th)
2011-03-31	06	10.5% (12th)	12.8% (7th)
2011-04-06	07	10.0% (9th)	12.5% (5th)
2011-04-07	08	10.5% (13th)	12.8% (7th)
2011-04-13	09	10.0% (9th)	12.1% (5th)
2011-04-14	10	10.8% (8th)	13.3% (6th)
2011-04-20	11	11.0% (5th)	13.7% (3rd)
2011-04-21	12	12.3% (5th)	15.1% (4th)
2011-04-27	13	12.3% (4th)	14.3% (3rd)
2011-04-28	14	11.9% (4th)	13.8% (4th)
2011-05-04	15	14.0% (3rd)	17.4% (3rd)
2011-05-05	16	14.5% (3rd)	16.2% (3rd)
2011-05-11	17	15.2% (3rd)	19.1% (3rd)
2011-05-12	18	12.7% (3rd)	15.4% (3rd)
2011-05-18	19	15.8% (3rd)	19.4% (1st)
2011-05-19	20	17.1% (2nd)	19.9% (1st)
Average		11.7%	14.1%

== Awards and nominations ==
Year	Award	Category	Nominee	Result
2011	Seoul International Drama Awards	Outstanding Korean Actress	Lee Yo-won	Nominated
2011	SBS Drama Awards	Top Excellence Award, Actress in a Drama Special	Lee Yo-won	Nominated
2011	SBS Drama Awards	Excellence Award, Actor in a Drama Special	Jo Hyun-jae	Nominated
2011	SBS Drama Awards	Excellence Award, Actor in a Drama Special	Bae Soo-bin	Nominated
2011	SBS Drama Awards	Excellence Award, Actress in a Drama Special	Nam Gyu-ri	Nominated
2011	SBS Drama Awards	Excellence Award, Actress in a Drama Special	Seo Ji-hye	Nominated
2011	SBS Drama Awards	Producers' Award, Actress	Lee Yo-won	Won
2011	SBS Drama Awards	Top 10 Stars	Lee Yo-won	Won

== Adaptation ==
In 2014, ABS-CBN produced a Philippine remake based on 49 Days. The adaptation, titled Pure Love, was originally aired from July to November 2014.
