= She Knows Everything =

2020 South Korean miniseries

- Promotional poster
- Also known as: Miss Lee Knows Everything; Miss Lee Knows; Miss Ri Knows
- Hangul: 미쓰리는 알고 있다
- RR: Misseurineun algo itda
- MR: Missŭrinŭn algo itta
- Genre: Mystery; Drama; Crime; Psychological
- Written by: Seo Young-hee
- Directed by: Lee Dong-hyun
- Starring: Kang Sung-yeon; Jo Han-sun
- Country of origin: South Korea
- Original language: Korean
- No. of episodes: 4 (8 parts)

Production
- Producers: Ahn Il-hwan; Kim Han-kil
- Running time: 75 minutes
- Production company: Studio HIM

Original release
- Network: MBC
- Release: July 8 – July 16, 2020

She Knows Everything (Korean: 미쓰리는 알고 있다) is a 2020 South Korean Mini series starring Kang Sung-yeon and Jo Han-sun. It aired on MBC from 8 July until 16 July 2020 at 21:30–22:45 every Wednesdays and Thursdays for 4 episodes.

== Plot ==
This series is depicting a mystery incident that deals with human desires and truths uncovered in pursuit of a suspect involved in a mysterious death.

Occurring in a reconstructed apartment, where Lee Koong-bok (played by Kang Sung-yeon), a real estate agent works, she is known with her popular name as The Queen of Nosiness or The Nosiest Queen by her neighborhood. She has a meddlesome type of personality. In Ho-chul (played by Jo Han-sun), is a self-conceited veteran detective. Although he is bad-tempered, he's a charismatic person. Together, they often bicker and try to chase and confront each other, but when they become embroiled in a mysterious incident, they find clues and choose to work together to find the truth.

== Cast ==
=== Main ===
- Kang Sung-yeon as Miss Lee(Ri) / Lee Koong-bok (woman, 40 years old)
  - A real estate agent in Koong Apartment, while her residence is the Building 9 Room 1004.
- Jo Han-sun as In Ho-chul (man, 42 years old)
  - A Gangnam ace and veteran detective with the highest arrest rate nationwide. He has a secret from 2 years ago.

=== Supporting ===
==== People in Koong Apartment ====
- Park Shin-ah as Yang Soo-jin (woman, 24 years old)
  - Yoo Chae-yun as young Yang Soo-jin (eps. 8)
  - The murder victim, a part-time music teacher at a nearby high school and a Model in the Shopping Mall. Yang Soo-jin is Lee Myung-won's first love, while her residence is the Building 9 Room 604.
- Kim Do-wan as Seo Tae-hwa (man, 19 years old)
  - The President of Gungbu Real Estate's son and residence is the Building 9 Room 1003.
- Lee Ki-hyuk as Lee Myung-won (man, 36 years old)
  - Yang Soo-jin's first love and the former Prosecutor. Myung-won become the son-in-law of Byungwoon Construction, who's aiming for the reconstruction of the Koong Apartment. His residence is the Building 9 Room 704.
- Moon Chang-kil as Bong Man-rae (man, 75 years old)
  - The Koong Apartment's reconstruction combination, his residence is the Building 9 Room 104.
- Jeon Soo-kyeong as the Women's society president (woman, 52 years old)
  - Sun-kyoo's mother and the Manager's wife, a simple and ignorant woman who knows a strong thing for a perforious thing. Both of her mouth, gaze and sex are rough.
- Woo Ji-won as the Manager (man, 46 years old)
  - Sun-kyoo's father and the Women's society president's husband. Beside his handsome appearance, he's a sensual five-year-old man who lives his life under the care of his wife who is much older than him.
- Kim Ye-won as Chong-Moo (woman, 24 years old)
  - She doesn't know where she came from. As a blind woman with a strangely cheap look, no, a wild beast. She's a tenant pretending to be the owner of Koong apartment.
- Kim Gyu-seon as Han Yoo-ra (woman, 35 years old)
  - Myung-won's wife and the daughter of Byungwoon Construction.
- Park Hye-jin as Nam Ki-soon (woman, 70 years old)
  - The Elderman's wife and a patient with severe dementia, sometimes she sneaks out at night to feed the stray cat. That day too, while hiding and feeding the cat, she met Soo-jin.
- Shin Won-jae as Kim Sun-kyoo (man, 19 years old)
  - The Women's society president and the Manager's son. A naughty and ignorant guy but is handsome, good-looking, popular and goes unnoticed.

==== People around Soo-jin ====
- Kim Keum-soon as Yoon Myung-hwa
  - Soo-jin's mother. She and Koong-bok are close like a sister. She shared a close friendship with Koong-bok and spent many years together, but now she is unable to move due to an accident.
- Bae Yoon-kyung as Yoo Hyun-ji (woman, 24 years old)
  - Soo-jin's middle-school's classmate and the head of the dressing room. She admire Soo-jin and Soo-jin admire her, she's so sad when see her classmate crumble.

==== Ho-chul's team, people in Police Station ====
- Yang Ki-won as Koo Dae-sung (man, 37 years old)
  - Ho-chul's partner, a long-time partner who has been silently watching Ho-chul's success as a detective. Even Ho-chul thinks that he doesn't know his secret from 2 years ago, but actually he already know that but hide it form Ho-chul.
- Kim Dae-gun as Kim Min-suk
  - As the youngest member of Ho-chul's team, Kim Min-suk nurtured his dream about becoming a detective in the midfield and learned the homicide business in there. Ho-chul thinks he is too crazy in work.

=== Extended cast ===
- Kim Kang-min as Bae Jin-woo (man, 25 years old)
  - The Apartment's delivery driver. He has been taking care by Miss Ri since she lived in a nearby apartment building. Since young, Bae Jin-woo was good at stealing cups and Miss Ri used her hand to stop him from going to prison several times.
- Kim Na-yoon as Byun Ki-nam (woman, about 40 years old)
  - A reporter of a Broadcasting Company and was once a resident of the Koong Apartment.
- Park Jung-un as a Gynecologist (eps. 8)
  - She is both of Han Yoo-ra and Yang Soo-jin's obstetrician and gynecologist. She's the one who test Yoo-ra and the result is Yoo-ra is declared infertile.
- Shin Jung-yoon as Teacher Hwang

== Ratings ==
Episode	Original broadcast date	Nielsen		ref.
Episode	Original broadcast date	South Korea		ref.
1	July 8, 2020	Part 1	3.2%	
1	July 8, 2020	Part 2	4,2%	
2	July 9, 2020	Part 1	3.2%	
2	July 9, 2020	Part 2	2.9%	
3	July 15, 2020	Part 1	2,3%	
3	July 15, 2020	Part 2	2.4%	
4	July 16, 2020	Part 1	2,3%	
4	July 16, 2020	Part 2	2.5%	
Average			2.8%	
The blue numbers represent the lowest ratings and the red numbers represent the highest ratings.
