= Lee Seung-il =

Lee Seung-il may refer to:

- Lee Seung-il (field hockey)
- Lee Seung-il (actor)
