= Woori the Virgin =

South Korean comedy drama television series

- Promotional poster
- Also known as: We Start Today; From Now On
- Hangul: 우리는 오늘부터
- Lit.: We, From Today
- RR: Urineun oneulbuteo
- MR: Urinŭn onŭlbut'ŏ
- Genre: Romantic comedy; Satire
- Based on: Jane the Virgin by Jennie Snyder Urman
- Developed by: Studio S (planning); Lifetime (production investment)
- Written by: Jeong Jeong-hwa
- Directed by: Jeong Jeong-hwa
- Starring: Im Soo-hyang; Sung Hoon; Shin Dong-wook; Hong Ji-yoon
- Composer: Choi Seung-kwon
- Country of origin: South Korea
- Original language: Korean
- No. of episodes: 14

Production
- Executive producer: Lee Seol-gi (Studio S)
- Producers: Kim Young-bae; Kim Tae-eun (CP)
- Running time: 70 minutes
- Production company: Group 8

Original release
- Network: SBS TV
- Release: May 9 – June 21, 2022

Related
- Jane the Virgin

Woori the Virgin (Korean: 우리는 오늘부터) is a 2022 South Korean television series written and directed by Jeong Jeong-hwa, and starring Im Soo-hyang in the lead role as Oh Woo-ri, with Sung-hoon, Shin Dong-wook and Hong Ji-yoon. Based on the American series Jane the Virgin, it premiered on SBS TV on May 9, 2022, and aired every Monday and Tuesday at 22:00 (KST) for 14 episodes. It is also available for streaming on Viu in selected regions.

== Synopsis ==
The series is a romantic comedy drama about Oh Woo-ri (Im Soo-hyang), a woman who kept her virginal purity, getting pregnant with a child of Raphael (Sung Hoon), the CEO of a cosmetic group, due to the doctor's mistake during a regular check-up.

== Cast and characters ==
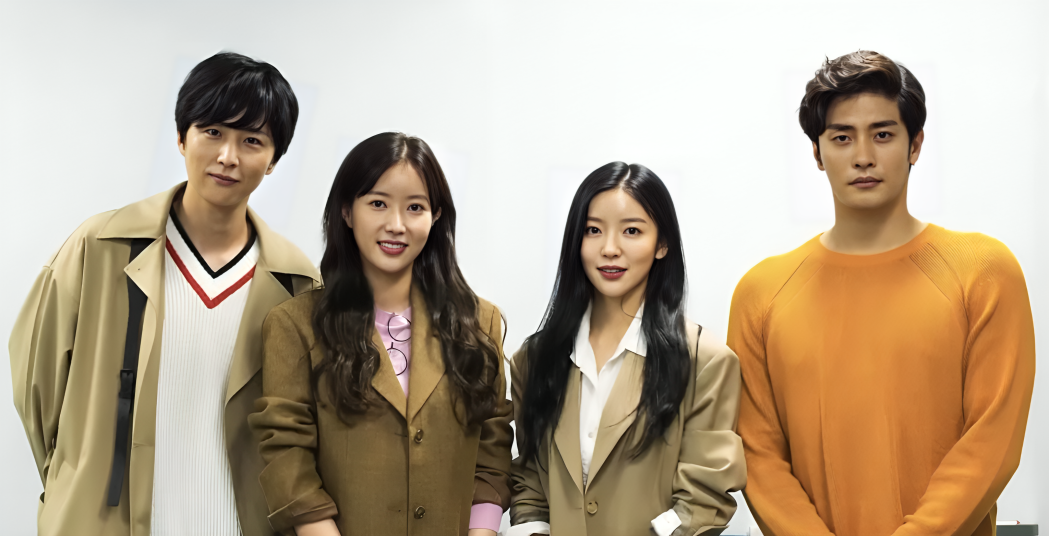
Woori the Virgin main cast at the script reading in 2022

=== Main ===
- Im Soo-hyang as Oh Woo-ri

29 years old, an assistant writer of a popular drama airing in that time.

- Sung Hoon as Raphael

33 years old, CEO of Diamond Cosmetics and the biological father of the child.

- Shin Dong-wook as Lee Kang-jae

33 years old, Woo-ri's fiance, a homicide detective.

=== Supporting ===
==== Seogwi-nyeo Tonkatsu ====
- Hong Eun-hee as Oh Eun-ran
  - Ko Joo-hee as young Oh Eun-ran

45 years old, Woo-ri's mother, singing class instructor.

- Yeon Woon-kyung as Seo Gwi-nyeo

66 years old. Owner of the tonkatsu shop.

==== Diamond Medical Foundation ====
- Joo Jin-mo as Kim Deok-bae

61 years old. Chairman of the Diamond Medical Foundation.

- Hong Ji-yoon as Lee Ma-ri/Lee Mal-ja

29 years old, Raphael's wife, Diamond Medical Foundation marketing team leader.

- Park Seon-young as Director Lim

36 years old, chief secretary.

- Nam Mi-jung as Byun Mi-ja

52 years old, trickster

==== Police office ====
- Han Jae-yi as Park Na-hee

29 years old, violent crimes detective.

- Kim Dong-hyun as class leader

47 years old, strong squad leader.

==== Broadcast stations ====
- Kim Soo-ro as Choi Seong-il

45 years old, broadcast age 39 years old, Eun-ran's first love, becomes a daily soap opera star after a long period of no fame. His real name is Choi Deok-chil.

- Lee Do-yeon as Yu Ye-ri

35 years old, drama writer.

- Im Jae-myung as director Park

37 years old, drama director.

- Yeon Min-ji as Choi Mi-ae

31 years old, actress.

=== Others ===
- Kim Sa-kwon as Park Doo-pal
- Kim Sun-woong as Noh Man-cheol
- Ahn Shin-woo as Jung Hyung-sik, the head of a security company.

=== Special appearance ===
- Hwang Woo-seul-hye as obstetrician-gynecologist

== Production ==
The series is a remake of American TV series Jane the Virgin which aired for five seasons on The CW television network in the United States from 2014 to 2019. The American series is itself based on the 2002 Venezuelan telenovela, Juana La Virgen.

Woori the Virgin reunites Im Soo-hyang and Sung Hoon after 2011 SBS drama New Tales of Gisaeng which was the debut drama of both of them, and 2016 KBS 2TV drama Five Enough.

On April 15, 2022, photos of the script reading were released.

== Original soundtrack ==
Woori the Virgin

Soundtrack album by Various
- Released: 2022
- Genre: Soundtrack
- Languages: Korean; English
- Labels: Genie Music; Major9

=== Part 1 ===
Released on May 10, 2022
No.	Title	Lyrics	Music	Artist	Length
1.	"I'm Going Crazy" (돌아버리겠네)	VIP, Drei	VIP, Drei	Lee Young-hyun	3:14
2.	"I'm Going Crazy" (inst.)				3:14

=== Part 2 ===
Released on May 17, 2022
No.	Title	Lyrics	Music	Artist	Length
1.	"I'm Going Crazy" (돌아버리겠네)	VIP, Drei	VIP, Drei	Kim Bum-soo	3:18
2.	"I'm Going Crazy" (inst.)				3:18

=== Part 3 ===
Released on May 24, 2022
No.	Title	Lyrics	Music	Artist	Length
1.	"Gosh"	VIP	VIP	Jessi	3:04
2.	"Gosh" (inst.)				3:04

=== Part 4 ===
Released on May 31, 2022
No.	Title	Lyrics	Music	Artist	Length
1.	"I'm in Love" (설레이는 중)	VIP	VIP, Drei	Shin Ye-young	3:01
2.	"I'm in Love" (inst.)				3:01

=== Part 5 ===
Released on June 7, 2022
No.	Title	Lyrics	Music	Artist	Length
1.	"Sunday to Monday"	VIP, Woody	VIP, Woody	Woody	3:43
2.	"Sunday to Monday" (inst.)				3:43

=== Part 6 ===
Released on June 20, 2022
No.	Title	Lyrics	Music	Artist	Length
1.	"I'll Be There" (있어줄게)	VIP	VIP	Sung Hoon	3:20
2.	"I'll Be There" (inst.)				3:20

=== Part 7 ===
Released on June 21, 2022
No.	Title	Lyrics	Music	Artist	Length
1.	"Goodbye"	VIP	VIP	Im Soo-hyang	3:10
2.	"Goodbye" (inst.)				3:10

== Viewership ==
Woori the Virgin : South Korea viewers per episode (thousands)

Season	Episode number														Average
Season	1	2	3	4	5	6	7	8	9	10	11	12	13	14	Average
1	712	866	699	757	N/A	557	N/A	640	N/A	N/A	N/A	640	N/A	613	N/A

Source: Audience measurement performed nationwide by Nielsen Korea.

Ep.	Original broadcast date	Average audience share		
Ep.	Original broadcast date	(Nielsen Korea)		TNmS
Ep.	Original broadcast date	Nationwide	Seoul	Nationwide
1	May 9, 2022	4.1% (18th)	4.6% (15th)	3.8% (18th)
2	May 10, 2022	4.5% (14th)	4.8% (13th)	4.2% (15th)
3	May 16, 2022	3.5% (22nd)	3.7% (19th)	4.0% (17th)
4	May 17, 2022	4.4% (15th)	4.8% (11th)	4.6% (14th)
5	May 23, 2022	3.1% (26th)	3.2% (N/A)	—N/a
6	May 24, 2022	3.4% (22nd)	3.6% (19th)	—N/a
7	May 30, 2022	3.6% (23rd)	3.6% (N/A)	—N/a
8	May 31, 2022	3.6% (15th)	3.7% (13th)	—N/a
9	June 6, 2022	3.1% (31st)	3.4% (N/A)	—N/a
10	June 7, 2022	3.5% (21st)	4.0% (16th)	—N/a
11	June 13, 2022	3.2% (27th)	3.5% (N/A)	—N/a
12	June 14, 2022	3.8% (20th)	4.0% (18th)	—N/a
13	June 20, 2022	3.1% (27th)	—N/a	—N/a
14	June 21, 2022	3.6% (23rd)	4.0% (14th)	3.7% (20th)
Average		3.6%	— (Note: Due to some ratings not recorded, the exact average rating is unknown.)	—
In the table above, the blue numbers represent the lowest ratings and the red numbers represent the highest ratings.

== Awards and nominations ==
Name of the award ceremony, year presented, category, nominee of the award, and the result of the nomination
Award ceremony	Year	Category	Nominee / Work	Result	Ref.
SBS Drama Awards	2022	Best Couple	Im Soo-hyang and Sung Hoon and Shin Dong-wook	Nominated	
SBS Drama Awards	2022	Top Excellence Award, Actor in a Miniseries	Sung Hoon	Nominated	
SBS Drama Awards	2022	Top Excellence Award, Actress in a Miniseries	Im Soo-hyang	Nominated	
SBS Drama Awards	2022	Best Supporting Actress in a Miniseries Romance/Comedy	Hong Eun-hee	Nominated	
SBS Drama Awards	2022	Best Supporting Actress in a Miniseries Romance/Comedy	Hong Ji-yoon	Nominated	
SBS Drama Awards	2022	Scene Stealer Award	Nam Mi-jung	Won	
