= Stealer: The Treasure Keeper =

2023 South Korean television series

- Promotional poster
- Also known as: Stealer
- Hangul: 스틸러: 일곱 개의 조선통보
- Hanja: 스틸러: 일곱 개의 朝鮮통보
- Lit.: Stealer: Seven Joseon Coins
- RR: Seutilleo: ilgop gaeui Joseontongbo
- MR: Sŭt'illŏ: ilgop kaeŭi Chosŏnt'ongbo
- Genre: Action; Comedy; Crime
- Developed by: Studio Dragon (planning)
- Written by: Shin Kyung-il
- Directed by: Choi Joon-bae; Min Jung-ah
- Starring: Joo Won; Lee Joo-woo; Jo Han-chul; Kim Jae-won; Choi Hwa-jung
- Music by: Park Se-joon
- Country of origin: South Korea
- Original language: Korean
- No. of episodes: 12

Production
- Executive producer: Lee Hye-young (CP)
- Producers: Kim Tae-hoon; Seo Jeong-hyun
- Running time: 70 minutes
- Production companies: Curo Holdings; Studio V+

Original release
- Network: tvN
- Release: April 12 – May 18, 2023

Stealer: The Treasure Keeper (Korean: 스틸러: 일곱 개의 조선통보) is a 2023 South Korean television series starring Joo Won, Lee Joo-woo, Jo Han-chul, Kim Jae-won and Choi Hwa-jung. It aired on tvN every Wednesday and Thursday at 22:30 (KST) from April 12 to May 18, 2023. It is also available for streaming on TVING in South Korea, and Viu in selected regions.

== Synopsis ==
Hwang Dae-myung (Joo Won) is a government official who is suddenly suspected of having a connection with a mysterious cultural property thief known as Skunk. He then joins an unofficial cultural asset recovery team named Karma to hunt down the thief and fight those who cannot be judged by the law.

== Cast and characters ==
=== Main ===
- Joo Won as Hwang Dae-myung and Skunk
1. Hwang Dae-myung is a civil servant of the Special Investigation Division of the Cultural Heritage Administration.
2. Skunk is a mysterious thief who wears a black mask and steals the country's cultural assets that are illegally taken by high-ranking members of society.
- Lee Joo-woo as Choi Min-woo

An elite police officer assigned to the cultural heritage team of the Seoul Metropolitan Police Agency.

- Jo Han-chul as Jang Tae-in

The founder of Karma, who is the former leader of the Violent Crime Section's Drug Squad.

- Kim Jae-won as Shin Chang-hoon

A former homicide detective.

- Choi Hwa-jung as Lee Chun-ja

A member of Karma who has unmatched hacking skills.

=== Supporting ===
Special Investigation Division of the Cultural Heritage Administration

- Min Su-hwa as Jin Ae-ri

The youngest civil servant of the Cultural Heritage Administration and Dae-myung's direct subordinate.

Cultural property offenders

- Lee Deok-hwa as Kim Young-soo

A person who stands at the peak of wealth with numerous cultural assets, but is blinded by endless greed.

- Kim Jae-chul as Jo Huin-dal

Young-soo's right-hand man who is a thief specializing in antiques and a cruel killer.

- Choi Jung-woo as Dr. Ko

A legendary grave robber and treasure hunter.

- Jung Eun-pyo as Choi Song-cheol

The director of the Institute of History and Culture.

- Jeon Jin-oh as Kim Young-chan

An antique and cultural property thief.

- Jang Gwang as Chairman Yang

An antique collector.

Others

- Lee Seol-ah as Ahn Yeon-ji

An orphan who lives alone with her younger brother in Taebaek Coal Mine Village.

- Jung Min-joon as Ahn Yeon-seok

Yeon-ji's younger brother.

=== Extended ===
- Shim Jin-hwa as Shim Mi-young
- Kim Won-hyo as Mi-young's husband
- Lee Seung-il as Seung-il
- Song Jae-hee as Jang Chun-peong

== Production ==
Early working title of the series was Karma: Seven Joseon Coins (카르마 – 일곱 개의 조선통보; Kareuma – ilgop gaeui Joseontongbo).

== Viewership ==
Stealer: The Treasure Keeper : South Korea viewers per episode (thousands)

Season	Episode number												Average
Season	1	2	3	4	5	6	7	8	9	10	11	12	Average
1	968	705	764	846	738	651	537	580	511	567	428	536	653

Source: Audience measurement performed nationwide by Nielsen Korea.

Average TV viewership ratings
Ep.	Original broadcast date	Average audience share (Nielsen Korea)	
Ep.	Original broadcast date	Nationwide	Seoul
1	April 12, 2023	4.678% (2nd)	4.964% (2nd)
2	April 13, 2023	3.668% (2nd)	4.397% (2nd)
3	April 19, 2023	3.582% (2nd)	3.913% (2nd)
4	April 20, 2023	3.766% (2nd)	3.926% (2nd)
5	April 26, 2023	3.638% (2nd)	4.224% (2nd)
6	April 27, 2023	3.140% (2nd)	3.677% (2nd)
7	May 3, 2023	2.396% (3rd)	2.951% (3rd)
8	May 4, 2023	2.225% (2nd)	2.213% (2nd)
9	May 10, 2023	2.418% (3rd)	2.739% (3rd)
10	May 11, 2023	2.325% (2nd)	2.521% (2nd)
11	May 17, 2023	1.939% (3rd)	2.287% (3rd)
12	May 18, 2023	2.320% (2nd)	2.812% (2nd)
Average		3.008%	3.385%
In the table above, the blue numbers represent the lowest ratings and the red numbers represent the highest ratings.; This series aired on a cable channel/pay TV which normally has a relatively smaller audience compared to free-to-air TV/public broadcasters (KBS, SBS, MBC and EBS).
