= Im Soo-hyang =

South Korean actress (born 1990)

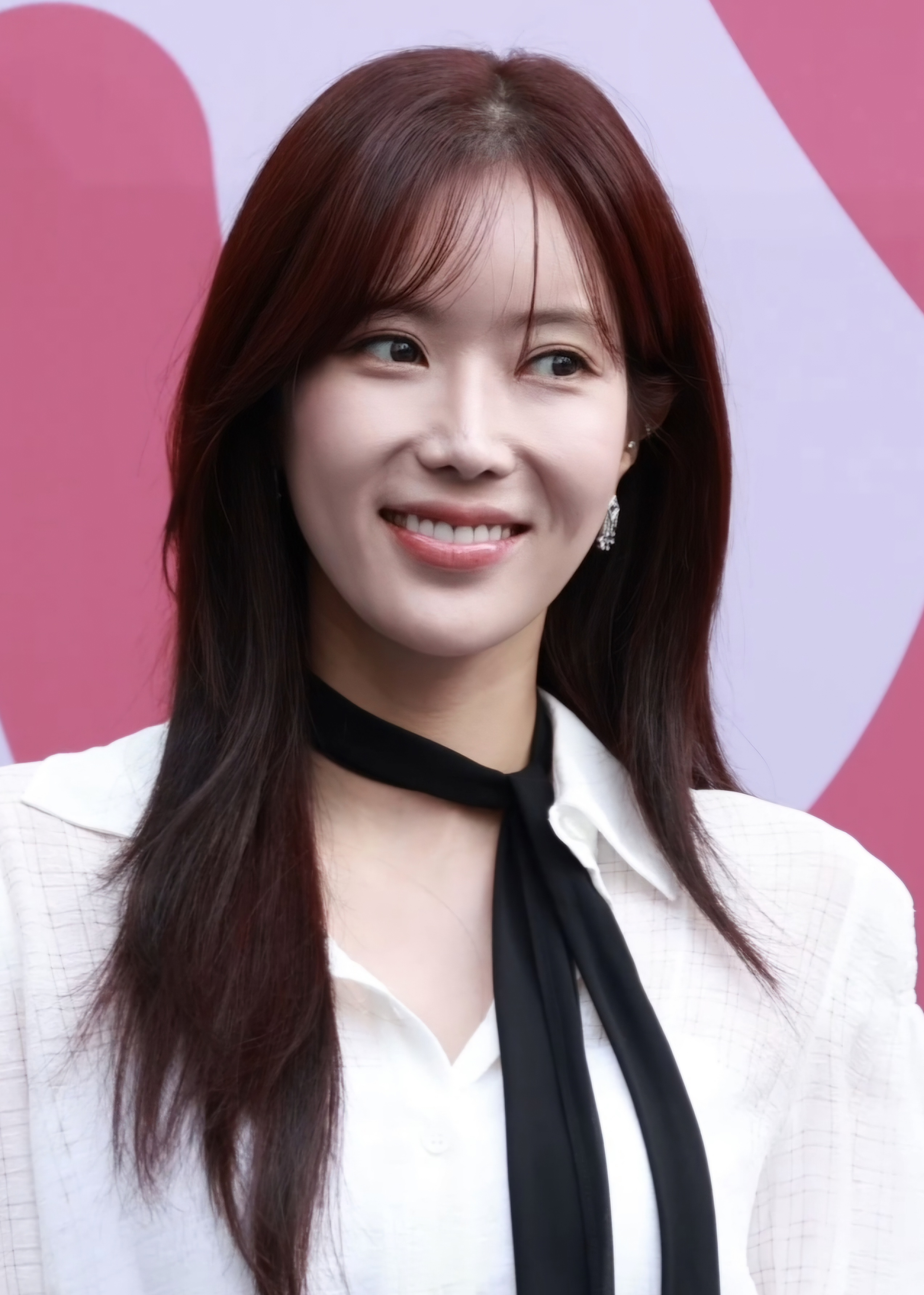
- Im in February 2024
- Born: April 19, 1990 (age 36); Busan, South Korea
- Other name: Lim Soo-hyang
- Education: Chung-Ang University (Theater and Film)
- Occupation: Actress
- Years active: 2009–present
- Agent: FN Entertainment (Note: formerly Hanyang E&M)

Korean name
- Hangul: 임수향
- Hanja: 林秀香
- RR: Im Suhyang
- MR: Im Suhyang

Im Soo-hyang (Korean: 임수향; born April 19, 1990) is a South Korean actress. She rose to fame playing leading roles in the television series New Tales of Gisaeng (2011) and Inspiring Generation (2014). After a series of supporting roles, she gained wide recognition for her performances in the campus romance My ID is Gangnam Beauty (2018) and the smash-hit mystery drama Graceful Family (2019). She then starred in When I Was the Most Beautiful (2020), Woori the Virgin (2022), and Doctor Lawyer (2022).

== Career ==
=== 2011–2017: New Tales of Gisaeng and diverse roles ===
After making a bit-part appearance in the 2009 film 4th Period Mystery while she was still a student at Chung-Ang University, Im landed her breakthrough role when she was cast as Dan Sa-ran, a prideful, lower-middle class dancer, in the 2011 popular television series New Tales of Gisaeng. Cast alongside Sung Hoon and Han Hye-rin, the series explored the premise that the gisaeng, the Korean equivalent of a geisha or courtesan, still existed in modern-day Korea. Im was nominated for several newcomer awards for her performance and won the SBS Drama Award for Best New Star and the Korea Drama Award for Best New Actress. That same year, she had a prominent supporting role in Paradise Ranch and made a cameo appearance in Salamander Guru and The Shadows.

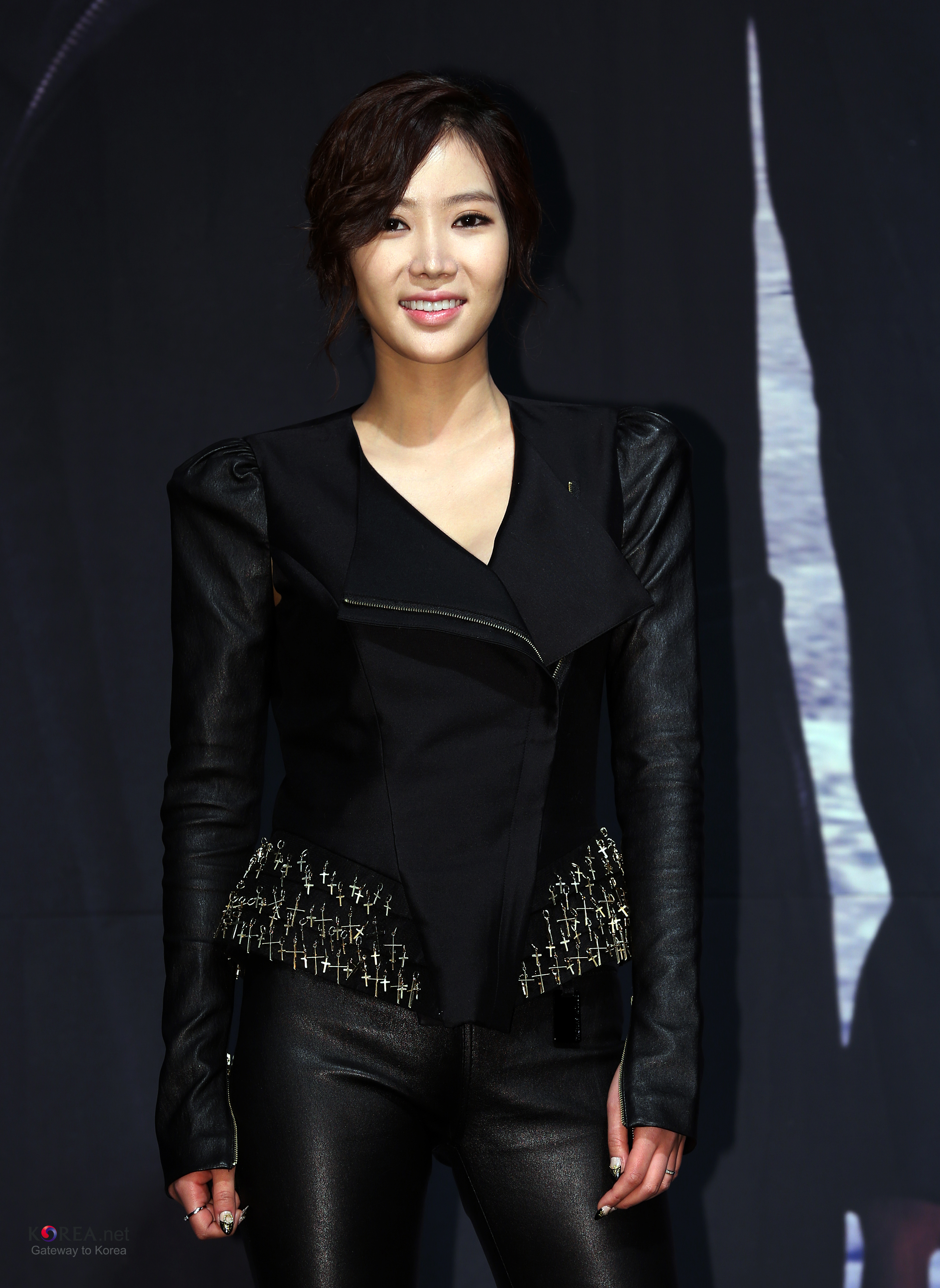
Im at the Iris II: New Generation press conference in 2013

To develop her range, Im increased her profile with starring roles as diverse as a feisty chairman's daughter in I Do, I Do (2012), a cool assassin in Iris II: New Generation (2013), the calculating stepdaughter of a high official in Inspiring Generation (2014), a college dropout in Five Enough (2015) and the female antagonist in Blow Breeze (2015). In 2016, Im played the title character in the prison romance film Eunha.

In 2017, Im was cast in the leading role of a widowed policewoman in Lovers in Bloom, for which she received a KBS Drama Award for Best Actress in a Daily Drama. Also that year, she made a cameo appearance as a serial killer who pretends to be a victim in tvN's crime procedural drama Criminal Minds, based on the American series of the same name.

=== 2018–present: My ID is Gangnam Beauty and rising popularity ===
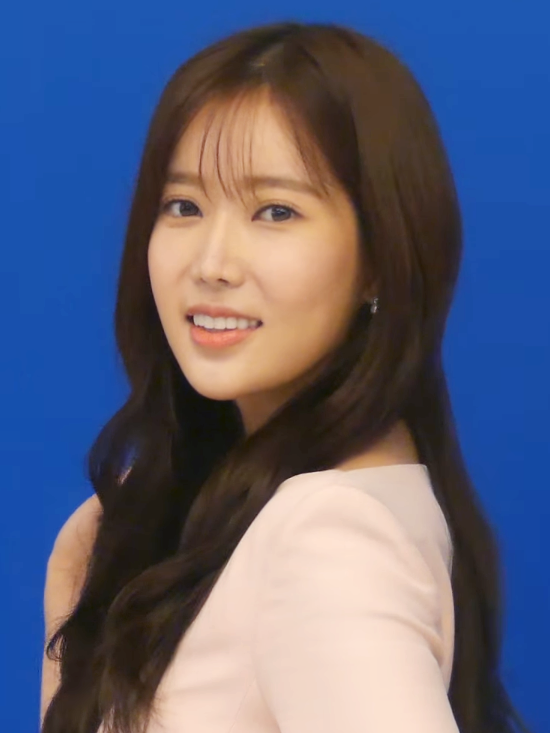
Im at the Atelier Cologne photo call event in 2018

In 2018, Im rose in popularity when she starred opposite Cha Eun-woo of Astro in the JTBC romantic comedy series Gangnam Beauty. For her performance as Kang Mi-rae, Im won the Top Excellence Award for Actress in a Drama at the 26th Korea Culture and Entertainment Awards.

In 2019, Im received critical acclaim for her portrayal of Mo Seok-hee, a confident, charismatic and savage chaebol heiress, in the mystery drama Graceful Family. The series premiered with high viewership ratings for MBN network and attracted media attention in Korea and internationally. In 2020, Im next starred in the romance melodrama When I Was the Most Beautiful opposite Ji Soo and Ha Seok-jin, portraying an optimistic ceramic artist who falls in love with two brothers. Im was again praised for her acting and she went on to gain the Top Excellence prize at the 39th MBC Drama Awards.

In 2022, she played the titular role of Oh Woo-ri in the SBS romantic comedy drama Woori the Virgin based on American series Jane the Virgin, reuniting with New Tales of Gisaeng co-star Sung Hoon. The same year she starred in the MBC medical-legal drama Doctor Lawyer in the role of a prosecutor. Later in July, Im joined the 'Bubble for Actors' platform.

In 2023, she played the role of Han Gye-jeol in the MBC romantic fantasy drama Kokdu: Season of Deity opposite Kim Jung-hyun portraying an ER doctor who graduated from the lowest-ranking medical school in the country. In 2024, she played the role of Park Do-ra in the KBS2 drama Beauty and Mr. Romantic opposite Ji Hyun-woo.

== Philanthropy ==
On March 16, 2023, Im donated sanitary napkins for vulnerable women through the NGO G Foundation.

== Filmography ==
=== Film ===
Year	Title	Role	Notes	Ref.
2009	4th Period Mystery	Number one fan Im Soo-hyang	Bit part	
2013	Iris 2: The Movie	Kim Yeon-hwa		
2014	Love of the Sea (海洋之戀)		Chinese film	
2016	Eun-ha	Eun-ha		

=== Television series ===
Year	Title	Role	Notes	Ref.
2011	New Tales of Gisaeng	Dan Sa-ran		
2011	Paradise Ranch	Lee Da-eun		
2012	Salamander Guru and The Shadows	Im Soo-min	Cameo (episode 8)	
2012	I Do, I Do	Yeom Na-ri / Jang Na-ri		
2013	Iris II: New Generation	Kim Yeon-hwa		
2014	Inspiring Generation	Teguchi Gaya		
2015	Great Stories: The Golden Days of Young-ja	Oh Young-ja		
2016	Five Enough	Jang Jin-joo		
2016	Blow Breeze	Park Shin-ae / Kang Mi-jung		
2017	Lovers in Bloom	Moo Goong-hwa		
2017	Criminal Minds	Song Yoo-kyung	Cameo	
2018	Gangnam Beauty	Kang Mi-rae		
2018	Top Star U-back	Herself	Cameo (episode 3)	
2019	Graceful Family	Mo Seok-hee		
2020	When I Was the Most Beautiful	Oh Ye-ji		
2022	Woori the Virgin	Oh Woo-ri		
2022	Doctor Lawyer	Geum Seok-yeong		
2023	Kokdu: Season of Deity	Han Gye-jeol		
2024	Beauty and Mr. Romantic	Park Do-ra		

=== Television shows ===
Year	Title	Role	Notes	Ref.
2015–2016	Shaolin Clenched Fists	Cast Member		
2017	Beauty Bible 2017	Host		
2018	Romance Package	Host		
2018–2019	Village Survival, the Eight	Cast Member	Season 1–2	
2019	The Quack Philosophers	Cast Member		
2022	Jump Like a Witch	Cast Member		

== Theater ==
Theater play performances of Im Soo-hyang
Year	Title		Role	Venue	Date	Ref.
Year	English	Korean	Role	Venue	Date	Ref.
2023	Our Little Sister	바닷마을 다이어리	Yoshino	Seoul Arts Center	October 8 to November 19	

== Discography ==
=== Soundtrack appearances ===
Title	Year	Album
"Goodbye"	2022	Woori the Virgin OST Part 7

== Awards and nominations ==
Name of the award ceremony, year presented, category, nominee of the award, and the result of the nomination
Award ceremony	Year	Category	Nominee / Work	Result	Ref.
APAN Star Awards	2024	Top Excellence Award, Actress in a Serial Drama	Beauty and Mr. Romantic	Won	
Baeksang Arts Awards	2012	Best New Actress – Television	New Tales of Gisaeng	Nominated	
KBS Drama Awards	2014	Excellence Award, Actress in a Mid-length Drama	Inspiring Generation	Nominated	
KBS Drama Awards	2014	Netizen Award, Actress	Inspiring Generation	Nominated	
KBS Drama Awards	2014	Best Couple Award	Im Soo-hyang with Kim Hyun-joong; Inspiring Generation	Nominated	
KBS Drama Awards	2016	Excellence Award, Actress in a Serial Drama	Five Enough	Nominated	
KBS Drama Awards	2017	Excellence Award, Actress in a Daily Drama	Lovers in Bloom	Won	
KBS Drama Awards	2024	Grand Prize (Daesang)	Beauty and Mr. Romantic	Nominated	
KBS Drama Awards	2024	Top Excellence Award, Actress	Beauty and Mr. Romantic	Won	
KBS Drama Awards	2024	Excellence Award, Actress in a Serial Drama	Beauty and Mr. Romantic	Nominated	
KBS Drama Awards	2024	Popularity Award, Actress	Beauty and Mr. Romantic	Nominated	
KBS Drama Awards	2024	Best Couple Award	Im Soo-hyang with Ji Hyun-woo; Beauty and Mr. Romantic	Won	
Korea Culture and Entertainment Awards	2018	Top Excellence Award, Actress in a Drama	Gangnam Beauty	Won	
Korea Drama Awards	2011	Best New Actress	New Tales of Gisaeng	Won	
MBC Drama Awards	2012	Excellence Award, Actress in a Miniseries	I Do, I Do	Nominated	
MBC Drama Awards	2016	Golden Acting Award, Actress in a Serial Drama	Blow Breeze	Nominated	
MBC Drama Awards	2020	Top Excellence Award, Actress in a Wednesday-Thursday Miniseries	When I Was The Prettiest	Won	
MBC Drama Awards	2020	Best Couple Award	Im Soo-hyang with Ji Soo; When I Was The Prettiest	Nominated	
MBC Drama Awards	2022	Top Excellence Award, Actress in a Miniseries	Doctor Lawyer	Nominated	
MBC Drama Awards	2023	Top Excellence Award, Actress in a Miniseries	Kokdu: Season of Deity	Nominated	
SBS Drama Awards	2011	New Star Award	New Tales of Gisaeng	Won	
SBS Drama Awards	2022	Top Excellence Award, Actress in a Miniseries Romance/Comedy Drama	Woori the Virgin	Nominated	
SBS Drama Awards	2022	Best Couple Award	Im Soo-hyang with Sung Hoon and Shin Dong-wook; Woori the Virgin	Nominated	
Soompi Awards	2019	Best Couple Award	Im Soo-hyang with Cha Eun-woo; Gangnam Beauty	Nominated	
