= Fall for You (TV series) =

2022 South Korean television series

- Hangul: 네가 빠진 세계
- Lit.: The World You Are Missing
- RR: Nega ppajin segye
- MR: Nega ppajin segye
- Genre: Romantic fantasy; Coming-of-age
- Written by: Shim So-young
- Directed by: Son Ye-eun; Kim Bo-ra
- Starring: Nana; Kim Jae-won; Yoon Hyun-suk; Keum Dong-hyun; Ha Sun-ho; Won Young-wook
- No. of episodes: 20

Production
- Production company: EBS

Original release
- Network: EBS1
- Release: October 20 – December 23, 2022

Fall for You (Korean: 네가 빠진 세계; also known as: The World You Are Missing) is a 2022 South Korean romantic fantasy coming-of-age television series written by Shim So-young, directed by Son Ye-eun and Kim Bo-ra, and starring Nana, Kim Jae-won, Yoon Hyun-suk, Keum Dong-hyun, Ha Sun-ho, and Won Young-wook. The series tells the story of Yoo Je-bi, who finds herself transported into her favorite romance web novel as the lead character amid the pressure of her group's comeback showcase.

It aired on EBS1 from October 20, to December 23, 2022, and airs every Thursday and Friday at 19:00 (KST). It is also available for streaming on Netflix. During its broadcast on EBS1, the series ranked first on Netflix Kids in South Korea around December 2022.

== Synopsis ==
Yoo Je-bi, a four-year veteran idol, debuted as the youngest winner of an audition program. Early in her career, she was referred to as a "national idol". Following public controversy and malicious comments, media outlets described her as the "nation's most hated person" and an "idol disliked by teenagers". Beset by malicious rumors, Yoo Je-bi prayed, believing she could endure if she remained innocent. She then hallucinated Je Su-oh, the male lead of her favorite web novel, and tripped and fell. Upon regaining consciousness, she found herself transported into the world of the novel as a high school villainess.

== Cast and characters ==
- Nana as Yoo Je-bi
- Kim Jae-won as Je Su-o, a core member of the Four Heavenly Kings in the web novel world, he is popular among female students for his looks despite his cold appearance.
- Yoon Hyun-suk as Jin Woo, the student body president and the one who actually controls the Four Heavenly Kings in the web novel world. As a senior to all students, he maintains a friendly image, but Yoo Je-bi discovers his secret.
- Keum Dong-hyun as Shin Han-se, one of the Four Heavenly Kings known for his playful charm. He grows close to the indifferent Yoo Je-bi and becomes a key ally in helping her return to reality.
- Ha Sun-ho as Lee Da-mi, the female protagonist in the web novel. She begins as an innocent protagonist and gradually becomes aware of her true feelings.
- Won Young-wook as Min Eun-hyun
- Kim Min-seol as Cha Sae Hee, a character who antagonizes Lee Da-mi in the web novel.
- Kim Shi-hoon as Kang Jun-seung, a mysterious transfer student at Habit High School.

== Production ==
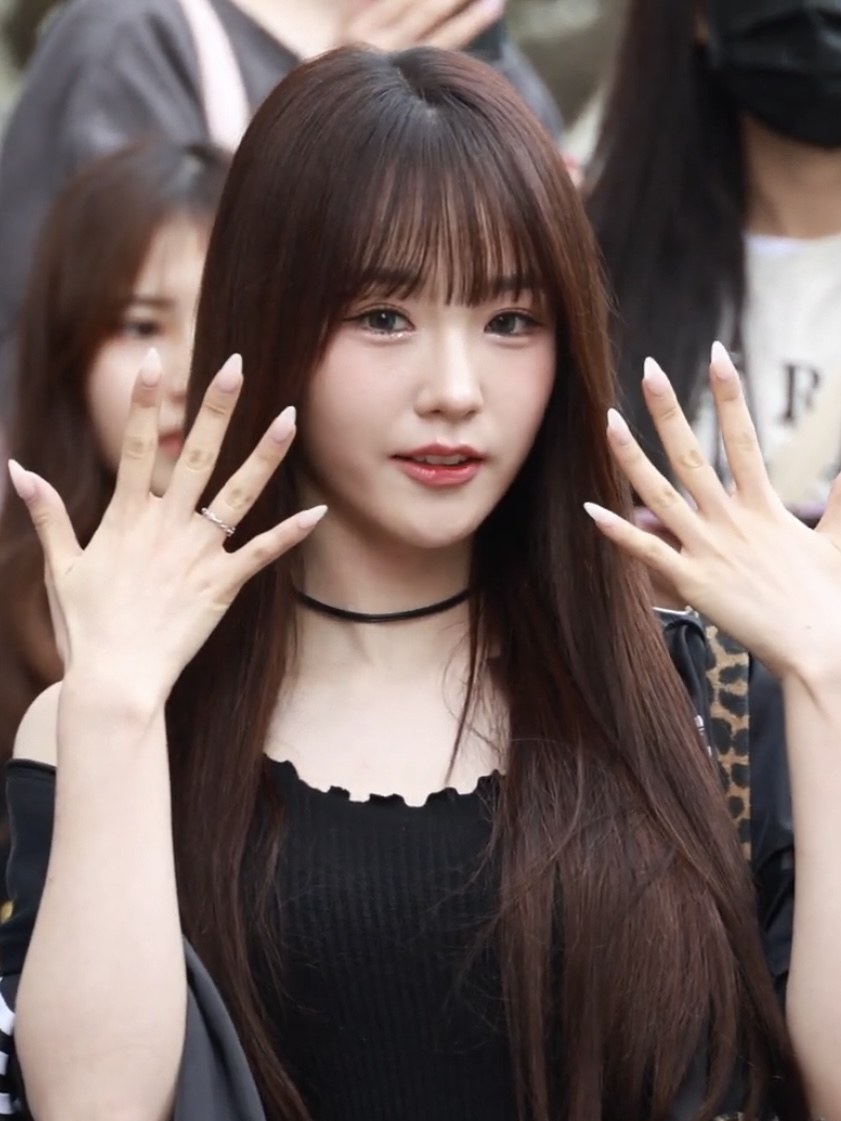
Nana as the central character

On September 9, 2022, Nana, Kim Jae-won, Yoon Hyun-suk, Keum Dong-hyun, and Ha Sun-ho were confirmed as the lead actors for the series. The series is co-directed by Son Ye-eun and Kim Bo-ra, written by Shin So-young, and produced by EBS. Nana accepted the role as a challenge to depict the character's duality, drawing on her experience as an idol. She struggled at first to differentiate the real-world and novel versions of the character, and opted to portray them with only subtle distinctions.

Producer Son Ye-eun described the premise as that of a national idol who, after suffering from malicious comments, falls into a novel and becomes a villainess. She noted the series combines fantasy elements between the novel and real world with coming-of-age themes and a youth love triangle. It explores how teenagers can navigate problems in a digital age "as natural as air", aiming to depict it "less self-destructively". She added that it portrays idol Yoo Je-bi, who is plagued by malicious comments and fake news, as she grows through her encounter with Je Su-o and gains the strength to overcome real-life difficulties.
