= Nam Gwon-a =

South Korean actress (born 1968)

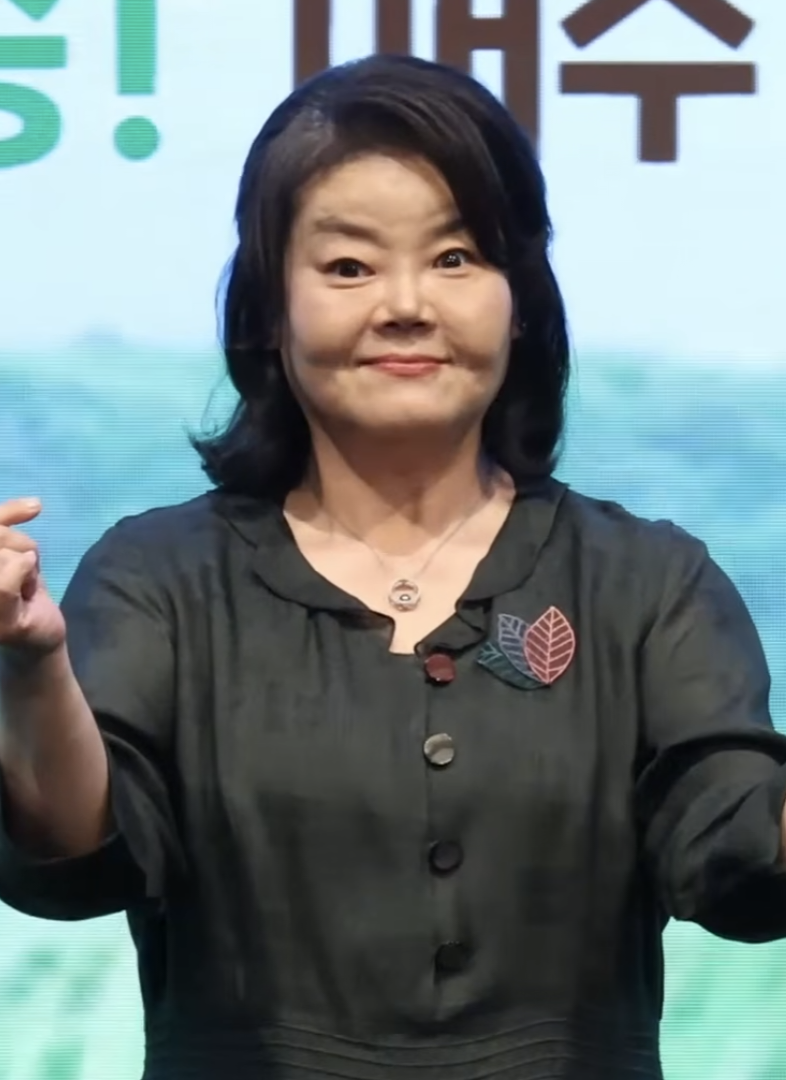
- Nam in March 2026
- Born: Nam Mi-jung; October 8, 1968 (age 57); Busan, South Korea
- Education: Pusan National University (Bacheol of Art at German Language and Literature)
- Occupation: Actress
- Years active: 1989–present
- Agent: Started Entertainment
- Height: 162 cm (5 ft 4 in)

Korean name
- Hangul: 남권아
- RR: Nam Gwona
- MR: Nam Kwŏna

Former name
- Hangul: 남미정
- RR: Nam Mijeong
- MR: Nam Mijŏng

Nam Gwon-a (Korean: 남권아; born Nam Mi-jung (남미정) on October 8, 1968) is a South Korean actress.

== Life and career ==
Nam Mi-jung was born October 8, 1968, in Busan, South Korea. She graduated from Pusan National University with a degree in German Language and Literature. Nam legally changed her name from Nam Mi-jung to Nam Gwon-a in 2022. She stated that the change was suggested by her mother and symbolized a "new beginning" for the second half of her life, noting that the new name felt more "independent and sturdy". Nam signed with Started Entertainment on October 11, 2024.

== Filmography ==
=== Film ===
Film performances
Year	Title	Role	Ref.
2014	Futureless Things	Yakult lady	
2016	Night Song	Seung Woo's mother	
2020	Hide and Seek	Mi-jeong	
2022	Good Boy	Chun-ja	
2022	Men of Plastic	Man Ki-cheon	

=== Television series ===
Television performances
Year	Title	Role	Ref.
2015	Reply 1988	Fortune teller	
2020	Chip In	Park Jin-soo	
2021	Beyond Evil	Fish market lady	
2021	You Are My Spring	Shaman	
2021	Happiness	Lee Deok-soon	
2021	Secret Royal Inspector & Joy	Jang Pat-sun	
2021	Snowdrop	Oh Deok-shim	
2022	Military Prosecutor Doberman	Ms. Paeng	
2022	Work Later, Drink Now 2	Tamna Restaurant Auntie	
2022	Woori the Virgin	Byun Mi-ja	
2023	The Good Bad Mother	Sun-young's mother	
2023	My Man Is Cupid	Ham Yeon-ja	
2024	Knight Flower	Bong Mal-daek	
2024	LTNS	Real estate agent	
2024	Doctor Slump	Nam Suk-Ja	
2024	Mr. Plankton	Hospital lobby mom	
2025	When Life Gives You Tangerines	Housekeeper	

== Awards and nominations ==
Name of the award ceremony, year presented, category, nominee of the award, and the result of the nomination
Award ceremony	Year	Category	Result	Ref.
40th Dong-A Theater Awards Best Actress	2004	Best New Actress	Won	
40th Dong-A Theater Awards New Concept Theater Award	2004	Best Actress	Won	
Seoul Theater Festival Grand Prize	2006	Best Actress	Won	
Seoul Theater Festival Directing Award	2006	Best Actress	Won	
SBS Drama Awards	2022	Scene Stealer Award	Won	
