= Why Her =

2022 South Korean romantic drama television series

- Promotional poster
- Hangul: 왜 오수재인가
- Lit.: Why Oh Soo-jae
- RR: Wae O Sujaeinga
- MR: Wae O Sujaein'ga
- Genre: Mystery; Melodrama; Legal; Romance
- Created by: Studio S (SBS); Viu (production investment)
- Written by: Kim Ji-eun
- Directed by: Park Soo-jin
- Starring: Seo Hyun-jin; Hwang In-youp; Huh Joon-ho; Bae In-hyuk
- Music by: Park Se-joon
- Country of origin: South Korea
- Original language: Korean
- No. of episodes: 16

Production
- Executive producer: Park Young-soo (SBS)
- Producers: Han Jeong-hwan; Park Bo-kyung; Kim Shin-ho
- Running time: 70 minutes
- Production companies: Studio S; VO Media

Original release
- Network: SBS TV
- Release: June 3 – July 23, 2022

Why Her (Korean: 왜 오수재인가) is a 2022 South Korean television series directed by Park Soo-jin. Starring Seo Hyun-jin in the title role of Oh Soo-jae, and features Hwang In-youp, Huh Joon-ho in pivotal roles, also Bae In-hyuk appears in the series. It premiered on SBS TV on June 3, 2022, and aired every Friday and Saturday at 22:00 (KST) till July 23. It is also available for streaming on Viu in selected regions.

== Synopsis ==
Oh Soo-jae (Seo Hyun-jin) is a talented lawyer and the youngest partner at TK Law Firm, the best law firm in South Korea. Oh Soo-jae is driven by her desire to win cases and also her self-righteous principles. She has lived her life to achieve success, but she gets involved in an unexpected case and she gets demoted to work as an adjunct professor at Seojung University law school. At the law school, Oh Soo-jae meets Gong Chan (Hwang In-youp). He is a student there. Gong Chan has experienced a painful past, but he still has a warm heart. He falls in love with Oh Soo-jae and he would do anything to protect her. Meanwhile, Choi Tae-kook (Huh Joon-ho) is the chairman of TK Law Firm. He would do anything to satisfy his desires, even if it's illegal or immoral.

== Cast and characters ==
=== Main ===
- Seo Hyun-jin as Oh Soo-jae

A star lawyer who is the youngest partner at TK Law Firm. She has become empty while pursuing only success. She is forced out because of an unexpected incident and demoted to becoming an adjunct professor at a law school.

- Hwang In-youp as Gong Chan / Kim Dong-gu
  - Lee Eugene as young Gong Chan / Kim Dong-gu

A twenty-seven-year-old law school student who is warm and innocent, but hides a painful past with a twisted fate.

- Huh Joon-ho as Choi Tae-kook

The chairman of TK Law Firm who crosses the boundaries of good and evil in the face of desire. He has power and hides his inner feelings. He watches over Oh Soo-jae, who is loyal to him.

=== Supporting ===
==== TK Law Firm ====
- Ji Seung-hyun as Choi Joo-wan

The eldest son and heir of TK Law Firm.

- Lee Joo-woo as Song Mi-rim

An associate lawyer at TK Law Firm and Legal Clinic Center Guest Attorney.

- Kim Seon-hyuk as Min Young-bae

Partner Attorney at TK Law Firm

- Jeon Jin-ki as Ha Il-goo

TK Law Firm chairman's chief secretary.

==== Seojung University Law School faculty and students ====
- Bae In-hyuk as Choi Yoon-sang

A second year student at Seojung University's law school and the second son of Choi Tae-kook.

- Kim Jae-hwa as Jo Kang-ja

A first year student at Seojung University Law School and Legal Clinic Center Team Member. She was a former police detective.

- Nam Ji-hyun^{1} as Na Se-ryun

A first year student at Seojung University Law School. Former employee of TK Law Firm's General Affairs Department, Legal Clinic Center Team Member

- Lee Jin-hyuk as Nam Chun-poong

A cheerful and optimistic law student who is also a former idol trainee.

- Kim Chang-wan as Baek Jin-gi

Dean of Seojung University Law School, Kang Eun-seo's father.

- Kim Young-pil as Seo Joon-myeong

Professor at Seojung University and The prosecutor became a professor. When he was a prosecutor 10 years ago, he was Kim Dong-goo's prosecutor. But he didn't know Gongchan.

- Ji Joo-yeon as Jeong Hee-yeong

A law school professor, and Min Young-bae's wife.

- Kim Ji-hwi as Park Jo-Gyo

Oh Soo-jae's teaching assistant.

==== Hansoo Group ====
- Lee Geung-young as Han Seong-beom

Chairman of Hansoo Group, the largest customer and sponsor of TK Law Firm.

- Park Shin-woo as Han Dong-oh

Hansoo Group's managing director.

- Jeon Jae-hong as Han Ki-tae

Nephew of Chairman Han Seong-beom, the head of the legal department of Hansoo Group.

==== People around Oh Soo-jae ====
- Lee Jong-nam as Yang Hwa-ja

Oh Soo-jae's mother.

- Nam Jung-woo as Oh Chun-jae

Oh Soo-jae's older brother.

- Lee Seung-bin as Oh Young-jae

Oh Soo-jae's younger brother

=== Extended ===
- Cha Chung-hwa as Chae Joon-hee

A professor of family medicine and Oh Soo-jae's only friend.

- Lee Kyu-sung as So Hyeong-chil

Gong Chan's roommate and the kitchen attendant in his pub. He was jailed for a year after dreaming of becoming a chef at a luxury hotel, but was caught in a gang brawl.

- Choi Young-joon as Yoon Se-pil

Representative director of SP Partners, Kang Eun-seo's fiancé. Works with Baek Jin-gi and Oh Soo-jae for Kang Eun-seo and Jeon Na-jeong's justice.

- Bae Hae-sun as Ji Soon-ok

Gong Chan's stepmother.

- Kim Joong-don as Do Jin-myung

A homicide detective.

- Seo Jin-won as Kim Sang-man

Gong Chan's father.

- Jo Dal-hwan as Gu Gu-gap

Gong Chan's roommate and in-charge of serving in his pub.

- Lee Jin-hee as Seo Jun-myung's Wife

The wife of a former prosecutor.

- Hwang Ji-ah as Jeon Na-jeong

Gong-chan's half-sister is warm-hearted with a bright nature and caring attitude. Helped Kang Eun-seo when Kang was sexually assaulted, and was killed for her involvement in the matter.

- Jo Young-jin as Lee In-soo

Together with the Labor Party future presidential candidates.

- Won Hoon-won as Lee Si-hyuk

Lee In-soo's son Chairman of the Social Welfare Foundation A bank run by skilled craftsmen.

- Hong Ji-yoon as Park So-young

who claims to be the rape victim of politician Ahn Kang-hoon

- Lee Tae-sung as Ahn Kang-hoon

A future politician who is a presidential candidate and a convicted rapist of Park So-young.

- Park Ji-won as Park Ji-young

Park So-young's younger sister who demands justice for his sister.

- Kim Yoon-seo as Im Seung-yeon

Choi Joon-wan's wife, who goes into flashbacks.

- Ryu Ye-ri as Oh Soo-jung

Oh Soo-jae's high school classmate and has a similar name.

- Kim Han-jun as Noh Byeong-chul

The real villain who raped Jeon Na-jung but was later released later

- Han Joo-hyun as Choi Jae-yi

Oh Soo-jae and Choi Joo-wan's daughter.

=== Special appearance ===
- Kwon Sang-woo as Jung Hyeon-soo

Chae Jun-hee's husband and a good hearted person.

- Han Sun-hwa as Kang Eun-seo

Yoon Se-pil's fiancée, Baek Jin-gi's daughter. Past victim of sexual violence and a road accident.

== Production ==
=== Casting ===
On December 10, 2020 SBS announcing its lineup for dramas to be released in 2021, including Why Oh Soo-jae with actress Seo Hyun-jin taking on the title role. The series is written by Kim Ji-eun and directed by Park Soo-jin. Seo would appear as an eccentric professor. Hwang In-youp and Huh Joon-ho were confirmed as part of the main cast in October 2021.

=== Filming ===
Script reading took place on October 19, 2021 while filming began in November of the same year, and ended on June 14, 2022.

On January 24, 2022 a representative from the entertainment industry told that filming stopped for two weeks after director Park Soo-jin was diagnosed with COVID-19. Park, who had never been vaccinated on the doctor's recommendation, was unable to return to the filming set for health reasons after the diagnosis; during his absence the series was co-directed by Kim Ji-yeon and Kang Bo-seung. On March 14, 2022, it was reported that Park had returned to direct the drama after three months of convalescence. On April 21, 2022 fresh photos from script reading site were released.

== Original soundtrack ==
=== Part 1 ===
Released on June 4, 2022
No.	Title	Lyrics	Music	Artist	Length
1.	"Vincent"	Don McLean	Don McLean	Sohyang	3:59
2.	"Vincent" (Inst.)		Don McLean		3:59
Total length:					7:58

=== Part 2 ===
Released on June 11, 2022
No.	Title	Lyrics	Music	Artist	Length
1.	"Beautiful"	Han Kyung-soo; Lee Do-hyeong	Han Kyung-soo; Lee Do-hyeong	Doko	3:49
2.	"Beautiful" (Inst.)		Han Kyung-soo; Lee Do-hyeong		3:49
Total length:					7:58

=== Part 3 ===
Released on June 18, 2022
No.	Title	Lyrics	Music	Artist	Length
1.	"What about us"	Eric Park; Sync Project; Hajin	ZigZag Note; Noh Eunjong	Hajin	3:44
2.	"What about us" (Inst.)		ZigZag Note; Noh Eunjong		3:44
Total length:					7:48

=== Part 4 ===
Released on June 25, 2022
No.	Title	Lyrics	Music	Artist	Length
1.	"I will love you"	Junwoo Jung	Junwoo Jung; Minken	K.Will	4:09
2.	"I will love you" (Inst.)				4:09

=== Part 5 ===
Released on July 9, 2022
No.	Title	Lyrics	Music	Artist	Length
1.	"I'm here"	Red Socks, INAN	Red Socks; INAN	Sojeong Lee	3:42
2.	"I'm here" (Inst.)				3:42

=== Part 6 ===
Released on July 16, 2022
No.	Title	Lyrics	Music	Artist	Length
1.	"Somewhere in the Mist" (안개 속 어디로)	Hanjun	Kang Butter	Gaho	3:49
2.	"Somewhere in the Mist" (Inst.)				3:49

== Viewership ==
Why Her : South Korea viewers per episode (millions)

Season	Episode number																Average
Season	1	2	3	4	5	6	7	8	9	10	11	12	13	14	15	16	Average
1	1.063	1.131	1.533	1.801	1.484	1.472	1.433	1.548	1.474	1.295	1.300	1.345	1.221	1.363	1.359	1.855	1.417

Source: Audience measurement performed nationwide by Nielsen Korea.

Average TV viewership ratings
Ep.	Original broadcast date	Average audience share		
Ep.	Original broadcast date	Nielsen Korea		TNmS
Ep.	Original broadcast date	Nationwide	Seoul	Nationwide
1	June 3, 2022	6.0% (8th)	6.1% (7th)	5.6% (10th)
2	June 4, 2022	6.5% (4th)	7.1% (3rd)	5.6% (7th)
3	June 10, 2022	8.4% (4th)	9.2% (3rd)	6.6%(10th)
4	June 11, 2022	10.1% (2nd)	10.5% (2nd)	8.4% (2nd)
5	June 17, 2022	8.9% (5th)	9.1% (3rd)	7.3% (7th)
6	June 18, 2022	8.8% (2nd)	9.5% (2nd)	7.5% (2nd)
7	June 24, 2022	8.7% (4th)	8.8% (5th)	6.1% (10th)
8	June 25, 2022	9.2% (2nd)	9.5% (2nd)	N/A
9	July 1, 2022	8.7% (4th)	8.7% (3rd)	7.1% (7th)
10	July 2, 2022	7.4% (3rd)	7.5% (2nd)	6.3% (4th)
11	July 8, 2022	7.0% (7th)	7.2% (6th)	N/A
12	July 9, 2022	7.7% (3rd)	8.6% (2nd)	5.7% (7th)
13	July 15, 2022	7.4% (6th)	7.9% (5th)	6.8% (8th)
14	July 16, 2022	7.8% (3rd)	8.5% (2nd)	6.3% (4th)
15	July 22, 2022	7.7% (5th)	7.9% (5th)	6.9% (9th)
16	July 23, 2022	10.7% (2nd)	11.4% (2nd)	8.2% (2nd)
Average		8.2%	8.6%	— (Note: Due to some ratings not recorded, the exact average rating is unknown.)
In the table above, the blue numbers represent the lowest ratings and the red numbers represent the highest ratings.; N/A denotes ratings that were not released.

== Accolades ==
Award ceremony	Year	Category	Nominee	Result	Ref.
APAN Star Awards	2022	Top Excellence Award, Actress in a Miniseries	Seo Hyun-jin	Nominated	
SBS Drama Awards	2022	Top Excellence Award, Actress in a Miniseries Genre/Fantasy Drama	Seo Hyun-jin	Won	
SBS Drama Awards	2022	Top Excellence Award, Actor in a Miniseries Genre/Fantasy Drama	Huh Joon-ho	Won	
SBS Drama Awards	2022	Best New Actor	Bae In-hyuk	Won	
SBS Drama Awards	2022	Best Young Actor	Lee Eugene	Won	
SBS Drama Awards	2022	Grand Prize (Daesang)	Seo Hyun-jin	Nominated	
SBS Drama Awards	2022	Excellence Award, Actor in a Miniseries Genre/Fantasy Drama	Hwang In-youp	Nominated	
SBS Drama Awards	2022	Excellence Award, Actress in a Miniseries Genre/Fantasy Drama	Lee Joo-woo	Nominated	
SBS Drama Awards	2022	Best Supporting Actor in a Miniseries Genre/Fantasy Drama	Ji Seung-hyun	Nominated	
SBS Drama Awards	2022	Best Supporting Team	Why Her (Note: Seo Hyun-jin, Hwang In-youp, Bae In-hyuk, Kim Jae-hwa, Lee Jin-hyuk, Lee Joo-woo and Nam Ji-hyun)	Nominated	

== Notes ==
- ^{1}Credited as Son Ji-hyun.
