= 2022 SBS Drama Awards =

30th edition of award ceremony

- 2022 SBS Drama Awards logo
- Date: December 31, 2022
- Site: SBS Prism Tower, Sangam-dong, Mapo-gu, Seoul
- Hosted by: Shin Dong-yup; Kim Se-jeong; Ahn Hyo-seop
- Produced by: Jang Seok-jin
- Official website: SBS Awards

Highlights
- Grand Prize (Daesang): Kim Nam-gil

Television coverage
- Network: SBS
- Viewership: Ratings: 5.4%; Viewership: 1.199 million

The 2022 SBS Drama Awards, presented by Seoul Broadcasting System (SBS). It was held on December 31, 2022, from 20:35 (KST) at SBS Prism Tower in Sangam-dong, Mapo-gu, Seoul. The show was hosted by Shin Dong-yup, Kim Se-jeong, and Ahn Hyo-seop.

Kim Nam-gil won the grand prize for his performance in Through the Darkness, whereas Namkoong Min received the Director's Award for One Dollar Lawyer.

== Winners and nominees ==
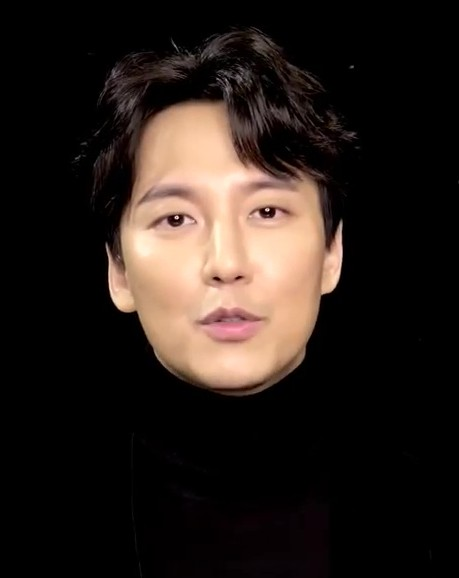
Kim Nam-gil, winner of Grand Prize (Daesang)

- Winners are listed first and denoted in **bold**

Grand Prize (Daesang)	Director's Award
**Kim Nam-gil – Through the Darkness**; Lee Joon-gi – Again My Life; Seo Hyun-jin – Why Her; Namkoong Min – One Dollar Lawyer; Kim Rae-won – The First Responders	**Namkoong Min – One Dollar Lawyer**; Kim Nam-gil – Through the Darkness
Top Excellence Award, Actor in a Miniseries Genre/Fantasy Drama	Top Excellence Award, Actress in a Miniseries Genre/Fantasy Drama
**Huh Joon-ho – Why Her**; **Kim Rae-won – The First Responders**; **Lee Joon-gi – Again My Life**; Kim Nam-gil – Through the Darkness	**Seo Hyun-jin – Why Her**; Kim So-jin – Through the Darkness
Top Excellence Award, Actor in a Miniseries Romance/Comedy Drama	Top Excellence Award, Actress in a Miniseries Romance/Comedy Drama
**Ahn Hyo-seop – Business Proposal**; Namkoong Min – One Dollar Lawyer; Sung Hoon – Woori the Virgin; Choi Daniel – Today's Webtoon	**Kim Se-jeong – Business Proposal**; Lim Soo-hyang – Woori the Virgin; Han Ji-hyun – Cheer Up
Excellence Award, Actor in a Miniseries Genre/Fantasy Drama	Excellence Award, Actress in a Miniseries Genre/Fantasy Drama
**Jin Seon-kyu – Through the Darkness**; Son Ho-jun – The First Responders; Hwang In-youp – Why Her	**Gong Seung-yeon – The First Responders**; Kim Ji-eun – Again My Life; Lee Joo-woo – Why Her
Excellence Award, Actor in a Miniseries Romance/Comedy Drama	Excellence Award, Actress in a Miniseries Romance/Comedy Drama
**Kim Min-kyu – Business Proposal**; Bae In-hyuk – Cheer Up; Shin Dong-wook – Woori the Virgin; Choi Dae-hoon – One Dollar Lawyer	**Kim Ji-Eun – One Dollar Lawyer**; Seol In-ah – Business Proposal; Jang Gyu-ri – Cheer Up
Best Supporting Actor in a Miniseries Genre/Fantasy Drama	Best Supporting Actress in a Miniseries Genre/Fantasy Drama
**Kang Ki-doong – The First Responders**; Kim Won-hae – Through the Darkness; Ji Seung-hyun – Why Her; Choi Kwang-il – Again My Life	**Kim Jae-kyung – Again My Life**; Ji Woo – The First Responders; Cha Joo-young – Again My Life
Best Supporting Actor in a Miniseries Romance/Comedy Drama	Best Supporting Actress in a Miniseries Romance/Comedy Drama
**Park Jin-woo – One Dollar Lawyer**; Park Ho-san – Today's Webtoon; Yang Dong-Geun – Cheer Up	**Gong Min-jung – One Dollar Lawyer**; Hong Eun-hee – Woori the Virgin; Hong Ji-yoon – Woori the Virgin
Best Couple Award	Scene Stealer Award
**Ahn Hyo-seop & Kim Se-jeong – Business Proposal**; **Kim Min-kyu & Seol In-ah – Business Proposal**; Sung Hoon, Im Soo-hyang and Shin Dong-wook – Woori the Virgin; Bae In-hyuk & Han Ji-hyun – Cheer Up	**Im Chul-soo – Today's Webtoon**; **Kim Ja-Young – One Dollar Lawyer**; **Nam Mi-jung – Woori the Virgin**
Best New Actor	Best New Actress
**Bae In-hyuk – Cheer Up and Why Her**; **Kim Hyun-jin – Cheer Up**; **Ryeoun – Through the Darkness**	**Jang Gyuri – Cheer Up**; **Lee Eun-saem – Cheer Up**; **Gong Sung-ha – Through the Darkness**
Best Young Actor	Best Young Actress
**Lee Eugene – Why Her**	**Kim Min-seo – The First Responders**
Best Supporting Team	Best Performance
**Cheer Up** (Note: with Bae In-hyuk, Han Ji-hyun, Jang Gyu-ri, Kim Hyun-jin, Ryu Hyun-kyung, Yang Dong-geun, Kim Shin-bi, Lee Eun-saem, Lee Jung-jun, Han Soo-ah and Hyun Woo-seok); Business Proposal (Note: with Yoon Sang-jung, Kim Se-jeong, Kim Hyun-sook and Lim Ki-hong); Through the Darkness (Note: with Kim So-jin, Kim Nam-gil, Jin Seon-kyu, Ryeoun, Kim Won-hae, Jung Se-woon and Lee Dae-yeon); Why Her (Note: with Seo Hyun-jin, Hwang In-youp, Bae In-hyuk, Kim Jae-hwa, Lee Jin-hyuk, Lee Joo-woo and Nam Ji-hyun)	**Lee Chung-ah – One Dollar Lawyer**

== Presenters ==
SN	Presenter(s)	Award(s)	Ref.
1	Kim Young-dae and Roh Jeong-eui	Best New Actor and Best New Actress	
2	Tang Jun-sang and Lee Jae-in	Best Young Actor/Actress	
3	Shm So-young	Scene Stealer Award	
4	Song Won-seok and Park Hyo-joo	Best Supporting Actor/Actress in a Miniseries Romance/Comedy Drama	
5	Lee Joon and Lee Yu-bi	Best Actor/Actress Mini-Series Genre/Fantasy Drama	
6	Kim Kang-hoon and Lee Ji-won	Best Supporting Team	
7	Lee Sang-yoon	Best Performance	
8	Shin Ye-eun and Ryeoun	Best Couple Award	
9	Kim Joo-hun and Jin Seo-yeon	Excellence Award for an Actor/Actress in a Mini-Series Romance/Comedy Drama	
10	Kim Eui-sung and Esom	Excellence Award for an Actor/Actress in a Mini-Series Genre/Fantasy Drama	
11	Lee Sun-kyun and Moon Chae-won	Top Excellence Award for an Actor/Actress in a Mini-Series Romance/Comedy Drama	
12	Lee Je-hoon and Pyo Ye-jin	Top Excellence Award for an Actor/Actress in a Mini-Series Genre/Fantasy Drama	
13	Park Hae-jin and Lim Ji-yeon	Director's Award	
14	Kim So-yeon	Grand Prize (Daesang)	

== Performances ==
Order	Artist	Act performed	Ref.
1	Matry		
2	Jang Ki-ha	"Envy None" + "New Year's Luck"	
3	Park Jin-young, Kim Hyun-jin, Ryeoun, Lee Jin-hyuk and Han Soo-ah	"Jailhouse Rock" + "Swing Baby" + "Honey" + "Groove Back" + "When We Disco"	

== See also ==
- 2022 KBS Drama Awards
- 2022 MBC Drama Awards
