= Jin Hyun-bin =

South Korean actor

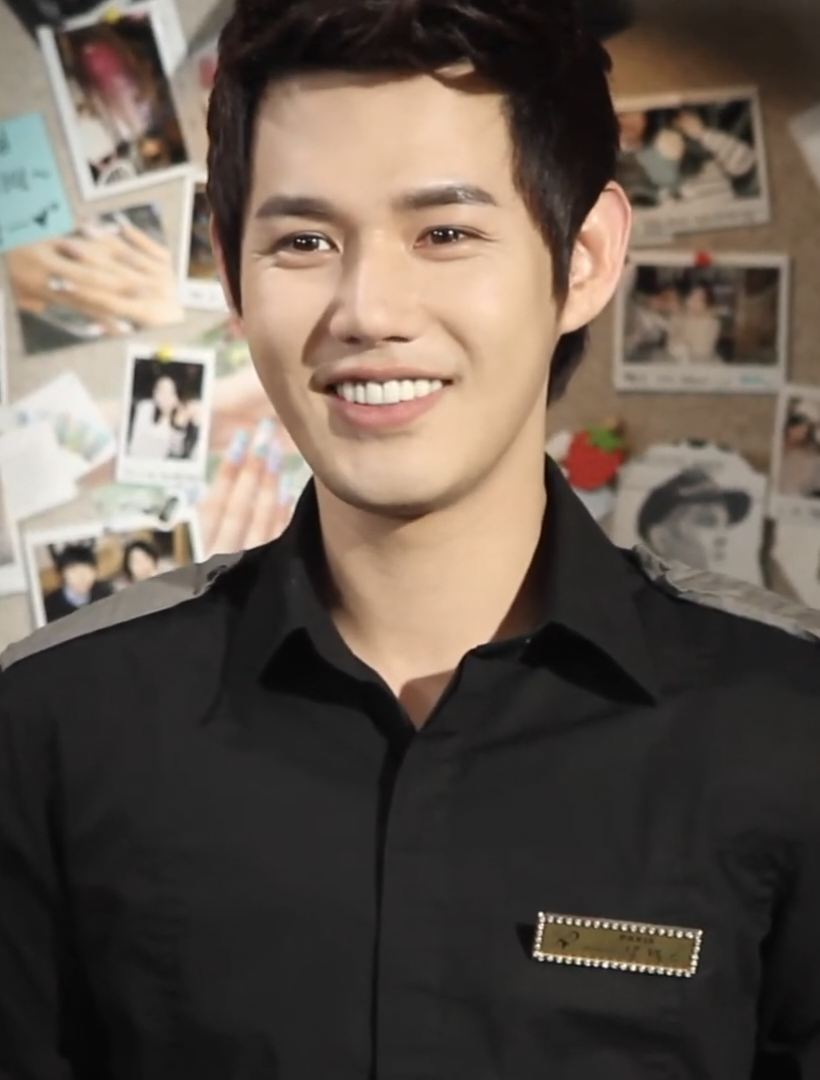
- Jin in 2013
- Born: 22 October 1985 (age 40); Seoul, South Korea
- Other names: Jun Ji Hoo, Jeon Ji Hu
- Education: Konkuk University
- Occupation: Actor
- Years active: 2010–present
- Agent: J Wide-Company
- Known for: Save Me 2 Master of Study; New Tales of Gisaeng

Jin Hyun-bin formerly known by the stage name Jeon Ji-hoo is a South Korean actor. He is best known for his roles in New Tales of Gisaeng, Jejungwon, Master of Study, and Save Me 2. He also appeared in Music Video of 2NE1 song "I Don't Care".

== Filmography ==
=== Television ===
Year	Title	Role	Ref.
2010	Master of Study	Ji-hoon	
2010	Jejungwon	Hyeon-ho	
2011	New Tales of Gisaeng	Son-ja	
2013	Nail Shop Paris	"Alex" / Kim Ji-hun	
2014	Love Frequency 37.2	Kang Hee-tae	
2019	Save Me 2	Choi Ji-woong	

=== Film ===
Year	Title	Role	Language	Ref.
2015	The Heaven is Only Open to the Single !	In-sung	Korean	
