= Criminal Minds (South Korean TV series) =

2017 South Korean television series

- Promotional poster
- Also known as: Criminal Minds: Korea
- Hangul: 크리미널 마인드
- RR: Keurimineol maindeu
- MR: K'ŭriminŏl maindŭ
- Genre: Procedural; Action
- Based on: Criminal Minds by Jeff Davis
- Developed by: Studio Dragon
- Written by: Hong Seung-Hyun; Andrew S. Wilder (original); Bo Crese (original)
- Directed by: Yang Yoon-ho; Lee Jung-hyo (resigned)
- Starring: Son Hyun-joo; Lee Joon-gi; Moon Chae-won; Yoo Sun; Lee Sun-bin; Go Yoon; Kim Yeong-cheol
- Country of origin: South Korea
- Original language: Korean
- No. of episodes: 20

Production
- Executive producer: Jung Tae-won
- Camera setup: Single-camera
- Running time: 60 minutes
- Production companies: Taewon Entertainment; ABC Studios (in association with)
- Budget: ₩16–20 billion (US$13.5–16.9 million)

Original release
- Network: tvN
- Release: July 26 – September 28, 2017

Related
- Criminal Minds; Criminal Minds: Suspect Behavior; Criminal Minds: Beyond Borders

Criminal Minds (Korean: 크리미널 마인드) is a South Korean television series starring Son Hyun-joo, Lee Joon-gi, Moon Chae-won, Yoo Sun, Lee Sun-bin with Go Yoon and Kim Yeong-cheol. The series is based on the American television series Criminal Minds. It was broadcast every Wednesday and Thursday from July 26 to September 28, 2017, on the cable channel tvN.

== Synopsis ==
The drama follows a group of highly trained profilers in the fictional National Criminal Investigation (NCI) team who track down criminals to solve cases. It begins a year after a crucial error results in a bomb detonating at a hospital, killing several SWAT officers and leaving the NCI team leader Kang Ki-hyung's confidence badly shaken. He returns to work after a long break and is immediately drawn into a serial murder case which requires the NCI team to collaborate with the local police agency's Violent Crimes Unit. They meet the temperamental police officer Kim Hyun-joon, who appears to have a bitter grudge against Ki-hyung.

== Cast ==
=== Main ===
- Son Hyun-joo as Kang Ki-hyung

The team leader and a veteran NCI profiler who has published a book on criminology. Despite his aloof and expressionless exterior he cares deeply for his team, whom he considers to be his second family. He and his wife Seo Hye-won have a son named Han-byul. He is the equivalent of Aaron Hotchner, portrayed by Thomas Gibson.

- Lee Joon-gi as Kim Hyun-joon
  - Kang Yi-seok as teenaged Hyun-joon

A second-generation police officer, joins the NCI at the recommendation of Kang Ki-hyung. He was initially a SWAT officer specializing in EOD who had transferred to the Violent Crimes Unit as an investigator after watching one of his subordinates die, when a bomb their team was defusing, exploded. He witnessed his father being murdered by a suspect when he was a child and has little sympathy for criminals. His brash nature and temperament has put him at odds with Ki-hyung and Sun-woo at times but he quickly proves his worth with his attention to detail, sharp instincts and accurate profiling skills. He is the equivalent of Derek Morgan, portrayed by Shemar Moore.

- Moon Chae-won as Ha Sun-woo
  - Jeong Ye-in as teenaged Sun-woo

An NCI agent and behavior analyst, her gruff demeanor and exacting mannerisms cause some friction between her and Hyun-joon. She tends to follow protocol and goes by the book, in contrast to Hyun-joon, who tends to rely on his instincts and experience. It is eventually revealed that it is her way of coping with the horrors she regularly witnesses on the job. Like Hyun-joon she is a former police officer. She was only hired to fulfill the female quota and relegated to desk jobs and running errands, which she said spurred her to work even harder to get to where she is now. Her father is a well-known defense lawyer whose clients include members of the business and political elite but Sun-woo remains estranged from him due to the fact that he has bailed out some of the very people she arrested. She is the equivalent of Emily Prentiss, portrayed by Paget Brewster.

- Yoo Sun as Nana Hwang

She is the NCI's bubbly technical analyst who provides support from her computer. She is the equivalent of Penelope Garcia, portrayed by Kirsten Vangsness.

- Lee Sun-bin as Yoo Min-young

She is the NCI's media liaison officer and handles press conferences. She has been the guardian of her orphaned niece Ha-eun since the deaths of her sister and brother-in-law. She is the equivalent of Jennifer "JJ" Jareau, portrayed by A.J Cook.

- Go Yoon as Lee Han

The resident genius and holder of two doctorate degrees, he is a profiler who often follows the team to the field to analyze the crime scene or the suspect's house for further clues. He is socially awkward and has a tendency to spout encyclopedic facts at the wrong time. He is the equivalent of Spencer Reid Ph.D., portrayed by Matthew Gray Gubler.

=== Supporting ===
- Kim Yeong-cheol as Baek San

He is Kang Ki-hyung's superior and has generally been supportive of him and his team. He is the equivalent of Erin Strauss, portrayed by Jayne Atkinson. Kim was busy filming My Father is Strange back and forth so he only made a few appearances.

- Kim Do-yeon as Yoon-ah's mother
- Kim Kang-hoon as Kang Han-byul, Kang Ki-hyung's son
- Im Soo-hyang as Song Yoo-kyung. (ep. 6-7)
- NewSun as Choi Na-young, Sang-hyun's younger sister. (ep. 1–2)
- Oh Yeon-soo as Seo Hye-won, Ki-hyung's wife. (ep. 1–4)
- Sung Chan as Choi Sang-hyun, Hyun-joon's best friend and a SWAT agent. (ep. 1)
- Kim Won-hae as Kim Yong-cheol, the serial killer also known as The Reaper.
- Hwang Bo-mi as reporter
- Park Geun-hyung as Commissioner General Kwon Sang-ho
- Park Han-sol as Son Na-kyung
- Shin Da-won
- Park Si-eun as Mo Ji-eun
- Hong Ji-yoon as Park In-hye
- Kwon So-hyun as Kwon Yoo-jin (cameo)
- Changjo (cameo)

== Production ==
The first script reading took place on April 7, 2017. Principal photography started on April 17, 2017.

The series was originally scheduled to be on KBS 2TV under Taewon Entertainment and Studio&NEW, but was later picked up for broadcast by tvN as its owner CJ E&M's subsidiary Studio Dragon replaced Studio&NEW as co-producer.

Kim Ah-joong was offered a role in the series.

Lee Jung-hyo resigned from his position as one of the show's directors due to differences with Taewon Entertainment.

== Soundtrack ==
Criminal Minds OST

Soundtrack album by Various artists
- Genre: Soundtrack
- Language: Korean
- Label: CJ E&M Music

=== Part 1 ===
| No. | Title | Artist | Length |
|---|---|---|---|
| 1. | "Higher Plane" | Flowsik; Kang Min-kyung | 03:37 |
| 2. | "Higher Plane" (Inst.) | | 03:37 |
| Total length: | | | 07:14 |

=== Part 2 ===
| No. | Title | Artist | Length |
|---|---|---|---|
| 1. | "Another Day" | Yoo Hwe-seung (N.Flying) | 04:04 |
| 2. | "Another Day" (Inst.) | | 04:04 |
| Total length: | | | 08:08 |

== Ratings ==
In this table, the blue numbers represent the lowest ratings and the red numbers represent the highest ratings.

| Ep. | Original broadcast date | Average audience share | | |
| Ep. | Original broadcast date | AGB Nielsen | | TNmS |
| Ep. | Original broadcast date | Nationwide | Seoul | Nationwide |
|---|---|---|---|---|
| 1 | July 26, 2017 | 4.187% | 5.491% | 4.9% |
| 2 | July 27, 2017 | 3.480% | 4.406% | 3.8% |
| 3 | August 2, 2017 | 2.884% | 3.363% | 3.3% |
| 4 | August 3, 2017 | 2.995% | 3.679% | 3.3% |
| 5 | August 9, 2017 | 2.368% | 2.996% | 2.8% |
| 6 | August 10, 2017 | 3.358% | 3.872% | 3.6% |
| 7 | August 16, 2017 | 2.544% | 3.269% | 2.7% |
| 8 | August 17, 2017 | 3.156% | 3.560% | 3.0% |
| 9 | August 23, 2017 | 2.292% | 2.794% | 2.3% |
| 10 | August 24, 2017 | 3.140% | 3.843% | 3.7% |
| 11 | August 30, 2017 | 2.036% | 2.539% | 2.3% |
| 12 | August 31, 2017 | 2.514% | 2.879% | 2.9% |
| 13 | September 6, 2017 | 2.236% | 2.766% | 2.4% |
| 14 | September 7, 2017 | 2.934% | 3.124% | 2.7% |
| 15 | September 13, 2017 | 2.119% | 2.647% | 2.5% |
| 16 | September 14, 2017 | 2.482% | 2.887% | 2.6% |
| 17 | September 20, 2017 | 2.474% | 3.126% | 2.5% |
| 18 | September 21, 2017 | 2.947% | 3.116% | 2.8% |
| 19 | September 27, 2017 | 2.241% | 2.982% | 2.3% |
| 20 | September 28, 2017 | 3.048% | 3.805% | 2.6% |
| Average | | 2.772% | 3.357% | 3.0% |

- This drama airs on a cable channel/pay TV which normally has a relatively smaller audience compared to free-to-air TV/public broadcasters (KBS, SBS, MBC and EBS).

== Awards and nominations ==
| Year | Award | Category | Recipient | Result | Ref. |
|---|---|---|---|---|---|
| 2017 | Asia Artist Awards | Fabulous Award | Lee Joon-gi | Won | |
| 2018 | 13th Soompi Annual Awards | Actor of the Year | Lee Joon-gi | Won | |
