= Joo In-young =

South Korean actress (born 1978)

- Born: 14 March 1978 (age 48); Seoul, South Korea
- Other name: Ju In-yeong
- Education: Sangmyung University (Bachelor of Theater and Film)
- Occupation: Actress
- Years active: 2002–present
- Agent: Eggplant Content
- Known for: The Devil Judge; When I Was the Most Beautiful; It's Okay to Not Be Okay
- Children: 1

Joo In-young (born 14 March 1978) is a South Korean actress. She is known for roles in dramas such as It's Okay to Not Be Okay, The Devil Judge, When I Was the Most Beautiful, Mother of Mine and The One and Only. She also appeared in movies A Reason to Live, The Bacchus Lady and Decision to Leave.

== Personal life ==
Joo is married and has one son.

== Filmography ==
=== Television series ===
Year	Title	Role	Ref.
2018	The Time	Manager Hong	
2019	Mother of Mine	Seo Kyung-jin	
2020	It's Okay to Not Be Okay	Yoo Sun-hae	
2020	When I Was the Most Beautiful	Hong Il-hwa	
2021	The Devil Judge	Kim Sang-sook	
2021	The One and Only	Chae Yeo-ul	
2022	Green Mothers' Club	Jae-bin's mother	
2023	One Day Off	Jin-young	
2023	Secret Playlist	Ji-yoon's mother	
2023	Boyhood	Kim Mi-yeong	
2023	Daily Dose of Sunshine	Nurse Lee	
2024	A Killer Paradox	Kang Jae-jun's mom	
2024	Chief Detective 1958	Fa Joo-daek	
2024	LTNS	Eun-hye	
2024	The Frog	Restaurant owner	
2024	A Virtuous Business	Cheol-mul	
2025	Second Shot at Love	Yeong-woong's mother	

=== Film ===
Year	Title		Role	Ref.
Year	English	Korean	Role	Ref.
2011	A Reason to Live	오늘	Baby's mother	
2016	The Bacchus Lady	죽여주는 여자	Migration center employee	
2022	Decision to Leave	헤어질 결심	Caregiver company director	
2023	Concrete Utopia	콘크리트 유토피아	Kim Po-daek	
2024	The Land of Morning Calm	아침바다 갈매기는	Immigration officer	

== Theatre ==
Year	Title	Korean Title	Role
2002	Gisaeng Bisaeng Chunhyangjeon	기생비생 춘향전	Gisaeng
2007	At The Marina	선착장에서	Reggie
2008	Yakiniku Dragon	야끼니꾸 드래곤	Mika Kim
2008	Gitven's Lunar New Year's Day	깃븐우리절믄날	Kwon Soon-young
2011	The Age of Love	연애시대	Wife
2014	Half-Body	반신	Shura / Maria
2014	Reply	반신	Sura
2014	The Flock of Stars	무리의 별	Marian
2015	Kyung-sook, Kyung-sook's father	경숙이, 경숙아버지	Gyeon-sook
2016	Kyung-sook, Kyung-sook's father - Ansan	경숙의 아버지 경숙 - 안산	Kyung-sook
2017	1945	1945	Ms. Hong
2017	Someone Who Does Miracles	기적을 행하는 사람	Grace
2018	Gilgok-myeon, Changnyeong-gun, Gyeongnam	경남 창녕군 길곡면	Stern lady
2018	Face Thief	얼굴 도둑	Fortune teller
2018	Fate	운명	Woman
2018	Texas Aunt	텍사스 이모	Teenage daughter
2019	Outlet - Consent	콘센트 - 동의	Sara
2019	Danton's Death	단톤의 죽음	Marion

== Awards and nominations ==
Name of the award ceremony, year presented, category, nominee of the award, and the result of the nomination
Award ceremony	Year	Category	Result	Ref.
11th Heather Theater Awards	2006	Expected Theater Impression Award	Won	
43rd Dong-A Theater Awards	2006	Best New Actress	Won	
