= When I Was the Most Beautiful =

2020 South Korean television series

- Hangul: 내가 가장 예뻤을때
- Lit.: When I Was the Prettiest
- RR: Naega gajang yeppeosseulttae
- MR: Naega kajang yeppŏssŭlttae
- Genre: Romance; Melodrama
- Written by: Jo Hyoun-kyoung
- Directed by: Oh Kyung-hoon
- Starring: Im Soo-hyang; Ji Soo; Ha Seok-jin; Hwang Seung-eon
- Music by: Gaemi (Music Director)
- Country of origin: South Korea
- Original language: Korean
- No. of episodes: 32 (Note: In order to circumvent Korean laws that prevent commercial breaks in the middle of an episode, what would previously have been aired as single 70 minute episodes are now being repackaged as two 35 minute episodes, with two episodes being shown each night with a commercial break between the two.)

Production
- Running time: 35 minutes
- Production companies: May Queen Pictures; RaemongRaein

Original release
- Network: MBC TV
- Release: August 19 – October 15, 2020

When I Was the Most Beautiful (Korean: 내가 가장 예뻤을때) is a 2020 South Korean television series starring Im Soo-hyang, Ji Soo, Ha Seok-jin and Hwang Seung-eon. The series follows a woman ceramic artist who falls in love with two brothers. Produced by May Queen Pictures and RaemongRaein Co. Ltd. for MBC, it aired on MBC TV on Wednesdays and Thursdays at 21:30 (KST) from August 19 to October 15, 2020.

== Synopsis ==
The drama tells the story Oh Ye-ji (Im Soo-hyang), an art student who dreams of becoming a ceramic artist. She heads to a school in Yangpyeong as both a student and a teacher, where she meets brothers Seo Hwan (Ji Soo) and Seo Jin (Ha Seok-jin). Hwan, who is Ye-ji's student, falls in love with her and takes her to his father's workshop to confess his feelings. However, at the workshop, Ye-ji meets Jin. Although Jin is aware of Hwan's feelings toward Ye-ji, he does not hesitate to win over her heart and eventually gets engaged to her. Overnight, those who are meant to be each other's strongest supporters end up becoming the worst enemies thanks to a twist of fate. Straddling desire and love, the three struggle to figure out what's right during the most beautiful time of their lives.

== Cast ==
=== Main ===
- Im Soo-hyang as Oh Ye-ji
  - Kim Do-Hye as young Oh Ye-ji

Oh Ye-ji is a ceramic artist. She has a pure heart and relentless optimism and refuses to give up no matter the situation. She dreams of finding ordinary happiness but in a cruel twist of fate gets caught in a love triangle with two brothers, Seo Hwan and Seo Jin.

- Ji Soo as Seo Hwan
  - Son Yi-hyun as young Seo Hwan

Seo Hwan, an architectural designer, is an innocent young man who falls in love with Ye-ji at first sight. His feelings put him at odds with his older brother Seo Jin, but he can't let go his fateful first love.

- Ha Seok-jin as Seo Jin
  - Park Min-Sang as teenage Seo Jin

Seo Jin is a race car driver and the leader of his rally team. He is cool and reserved on the outside but ruthless in the pursuit in what he desires. When he meet Oh Ye-ji for the first time at his father's workshop, he instinctually feels attracted to her.

- Hwang Seung-eon as Carrie Jung

Carrie Jung is a sponsor manager at Koryo Monster and ex-girlfriend of Jin. She is charismatic, and she is intensely jealous of her ex-lover and has a selfish egotistic streaks. She is still passionately in love with Seo Jin, and is unable to let him go even after their break up.

=== Supporting ===
==== People around Seo Hwan ====
- Park Ji-young as Kim Yeon-da, Hwan's mother
- Choi Jong-hwan as Seo Sung-gon, Hwan's father
- Jeon Yu-lim as Jung Da-woon, Seo Hwan's classmate
- Son Bo-seung as Baek Jung-il, Seo Hwan's classmate
- Joo In-young as Hong Il-hwa, Da Woon's mother
- Lee Seung-il as Song In-ho, Seo Hwan's classmate
- Stephanie Lee as Amber, Seo Hwan's College Classmate

==== People around Oh Ye-ji ====
- Kim Mi-kyung as Kim Go-woon, Ye-ji's mother
- Kim Jung-tae as Ye-ji's father
- Shin Yi as Oh Ji-young, Ye-ji's aunt
- Jung Eun-pyo as Lee Kyeong-sik, Ye-ji's uncle
- Kim No-jin as Lee Chan-hee, Ye-ji's cousin
- Lee Dong-ha as Ryu Sueng-min, Ye-ji's ex-boyfriend

==== People around Seo Jin ====
- Park Ji-young as Kim Yeon-da, Jin's mother
- Choi Jong-hwan as Seo Sung-gon, Jin's father
- Lee Jae-yong as President Bang
- Kim Tae-gyeom as Kang Ki-seok, Jin's racing team
- Jung Wook-jin as Park Woo-geun, Jin's racing team

==== Others ====
- Kwon Hyuk as Kim Yeon-cheol
- Jung Wook-jin as Park Woo-geun
- Seo Eun-woo as Yoon Ji-Yang (Ep. 1–3)
- Daniel Joey Albright as Sam (Ep. 1–3)
- Lee Seung-il as Song In-ho
- Shin Dam-soo as Song In-ho's father
- Hwang Hyo-eun as Song In-ho's mother

== Production ==
- The first script reading of the cast was held in April 2020 at MBC Ilsan Dream Centre in Gyeonggi Province, South Korea.

== Original soundtrack ==
When I Was the Most Beautiful OST Album

Soundtrack album by Various artists
- Released: 2020
- Genre: Soundtrack
- Language: Korean

=== Part 1 ===
Released on August 19, 2020
No.	Title	Artist	Length
1.	"Go With" (동행)	1415	04:39
2.	"Go With" (Inst.)		04:39
Total length:			08:78

=== Part 2 ===
Released on August 27, 2020
No.	Title	Artist	Length
1.	"Once" (한번)	So Hyang	04:12
2.	"Once" (Inst.)		04:12
Total length:			08:24

=== Part 3 ===
Released on September 3, 2020
No.	Title	Artist	Length
1.	"You Should Be Happy" (그대 행복해야 해요)	Jeon Sang Keun	03:34
2.	"You Should Be Happy" (Inst.)		03:34
Total length:			06:68

=== Part 4 ===
Released on September 10, 2020
No.	Title	Artist	Length
1.	"The Days Engraved" (새겨진 나날들이)	Lucia	03:54
2.	"The Days Engraved" (Inst.)		03:54
Total length:			07:08

=== Part 5 ===
Released on September 17, 2020
No.	Title	Artist	Length
1.	"Walking The Way We Only Know" (우리만 아는 그 길을 걸어가요)	Floody	03:21
2.	"Walking The Way We Only Know" (Inst.)		03:21
Total length:			06:42

=== Part 6 ===
Released on September 24, 2020
No.	Title	Artist	Length
1.	"Draw Into You" (너로 물든다는 것)	Monday (Weeekly)	03:28
2.	"Draw Into You" (Inst.)		03:28
Total length:			06:56

=== Part 7 ===
Released on October 1, 2020
No.	Title	Artist	Length
1.	"Dream of Mirror"	Jo Yuma (조유마)	05:47
2.	"Dream of Mirror" (Inst.)		05:47
Total length:			10:94

== Ratings ==
In this table, the blue numbers represent the lowest ratings and the red numbers represent the highest ratings.

Ep.	Original broadcast date	Average audience share (Nielsen Korea)
Ep.	Original broadcast date	Nationwide
1	August 19, 2020	2.4%
2	August 19, 2020	2.9%
3	August 20, 2020	2.0%
4	August 20, 2020	2.4%
5	August 27, 2020	1.9%
6	August 27, 2020	2.5%
7	September 2, 2020	2.2%
8	September 2, 2020	3.0%
9	September 3, 2020	2.8%
10	September 3, 2020	3.0%
11	September 9, 2020	2.6%
12	September 9, 2020	3.5%
13	September 10, 2020	3.2%
14	September 10, 2020	4.2%
15	September 16, 2020	2.7%
16	September 16, 2020	3.6%
17	September 17, 2020	3.7%
18	September 17, 2020	4.7%
19	September 23, 2020	2.7%
20	September 23, 2020	3.7%
21	September 24, 2020	3.8%
22	September 24, 2020	4.6%
23	September 30, 2020	1.7%
24	September 30, 2020	2.3%
25	October 7, 2020	2.6%
26	October 7, 2020	3.2%
27	October 8, 2020	3.4%
28	October 8, 2020	3.6%
29	October 14, 2020	3.1%
30	October 14, 2020	4.1%
31	October 15, 2020	3.9%
32	October 15, 2020	5.0%
Average		3.1%

- Note: On August 26, 2020, the broadcast was canceled in order to air special news coverage of Typhoon Bavi. Episodes 5 and 6 were aired on August 27 instead.
