= Yoon Hyun-suk =

South Korean actor and singer (born 2001)

- Yoon in 2020
- Born: September 8, 2001 (age 25); South Korea
- Occupations: Singer; actor
- Years active: 2019–present
- Agent: Management Run
- Musical career
- Genre: K-pop
- Instrument: Vocals
- Label: C9
- Formerly of: CIX

Korean name
- Hangul: 윤현석
- RR: Yun Hyeonseok
- MR: Yun Hyŏnsŏk
- Website: managementrun.co.kr/portfolio/현석/

Yoon Hyun-suk (Korean: 윤현석; born September 8, 2001), known mononymously as Hyunsuk, is a South Korean actor, singer, and rapper. He is a former member of the boy group CIX debuted in 2019. He is best known for his lead roles in Best Mistake 3 (2021), Fall for You (2022), and The Chairman Is Level 9 (2024).

== Career ==
On March 13, 2019, C9 Entertainment revealed Hyunsuk as the third member of its upcoming boy group, tentatively named C9Boyz, by releasing his first profile image. The group debuted as CIX on July 23, 2019. In 2021, Yoon made his acting debut in season 3 of the web series Best Mistake. On April 29, 2026, C9 announced CIX's disbandment and the end of his contract on May 31. In June 2026, he signed an exclusive contract with Management Run and began focusing on acting.

== Filmography ==
=== Television series ===
Key
†	Denotes television productions that have not yet been released

Year	Title	Role	Notes	Ref.
2022	Fall for You	Jin Woo		
2024	The Chairman Is Level 9	Boo Ro-won		
2026	My Bias, My Boss	Hyeok		
TBA	Study Group †	Ji Young-hyun	Season 2	

=== Web series ===
Year	Title	Role	Notes	Ref.
2021	Best Mistake	Kim Dae-young	Acting debut (season 3)	
2025	Me, Myself, and I	Nam Do-yoon	Short-form	
2025	The Prime Minister's Youngest Young Master's First Love	Lee Kwon	Short-form	
2026	My Little Chef	Do Yoon	Short-form	
