= Cloud Stairs =

2006 South Korean TV series

- Promotional poster
- Also known as: Stairway of Clouds; Cloud Staircase
- Written by: Kim Shi-hyun; Yoo Hyun-joo
- Directed by: Kim Yong-kyu; Sung Do-joon
- Starring: Shin Dong-wook; Han Ji-hye
- Opening theme: 세상 그 꿈 안에서 (Life in a Dream)
- Country of origin: South Korea
- Original language: Korean
- No. of episodes: 16

Production
- Producer: Hong Sung-deok
- Running time: 70 minutes Mondays and Tuesdays at 21:55 (KST)
- Production company: JS Pictures

Original release
- Network: Korean Broadcasting System
- Release: September 18 – November 7, 2006

Cloud Stairs (Korean: 구름계단; RR: Gureumgyedan) is a 2006 South Korean television series starring Shin Dong-wook, Han Ji-hye, Im Jung-eun and Kim Jung-hyun. It aired on KBS2 from September 18 to November 7, 2006, on Mondays and Tuesdays at 21:55 for 16 episodes.

== Plot ==
Jong-soo has no other choice but to give up going to medical school due to financial difficulties. He leaves for a remote island without telling anyone his whereabouts. On the island, he meets a doctor who teaches him medical techniques and begins to treat patients without a license. One day Jong-soo rescues Jung-won, a dying woman by mere chance, and is mistaken for a talented doctor. But things get messed up as he continues to meet with Jung-won, as one misunderstanding spawns another. He ends up falling in love with her, and gradually finds himself addicted to love. To protect his feelings, Jong-soo keeps lying about his educational background and tries to escape from his past. But when he reaches the pinnacle of his "success," he realizes that everything he has done so far was in vain. His love turns into poison and ruins his life.

== Cast ==
=== Main characters ===
- Shin Dong-wook as Choi Jong-soo
- Han Ji-hye as Yoon Jung-won
- Im Jung-eun as Oh Yoon-hee
- Kim Jung-hyun as Kim Do-hyun

=== Supporting characters ===
- Choi Jong-won as Doctor Byun
- Kim Yong-gun as Doctor Yoon, Jung-won's father
- Yang Geum-seok as Jung-won's mother
- Lee Mi-young as Yoon-hee's mother
- Yeon Kyu-jin as Director Kim, Do-hyun's father
- Kang Joo-hyung
- Jang Ji-min
- Kim Sang-won
