= Hong Ji-yoon =

South Korean actress

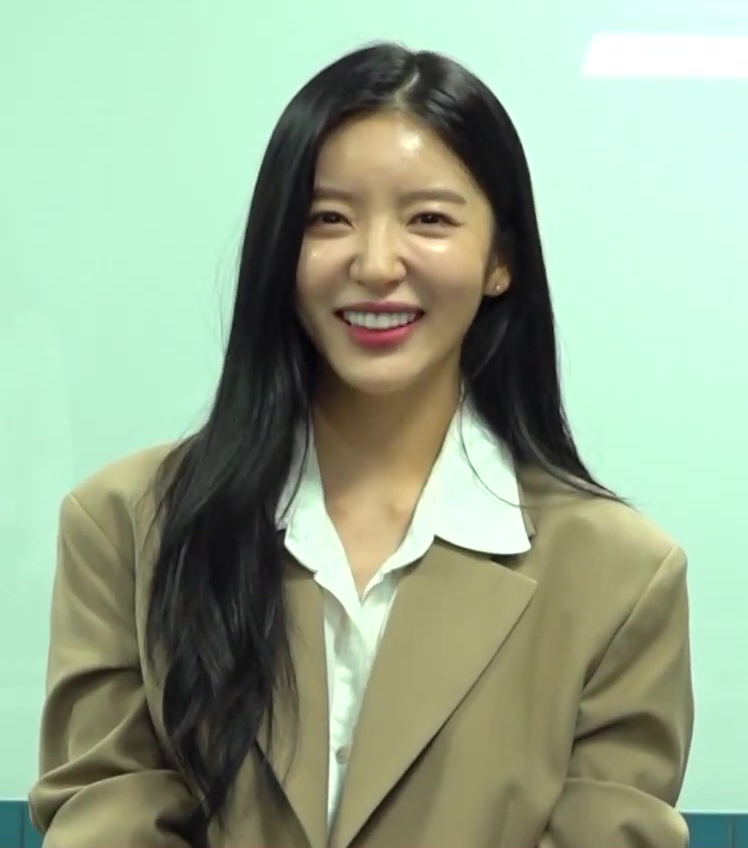
- Hong in 2022
- Born: March 3, 1991 (age 35); South Korea
- Occupation: Actress
- Years active: 2016–present
- Agent: Moving Pictures Company
- Height: 168 cm (5 ft 6 in)
- Relatives: Hong Ji-hee (sister)

Korean name
- Hangul: 홍지윤
- RR: Hong Jiyun
- MR: Hong Chiyun

Hong Ji-yoon (Korean: 홍지윤; born March 3, 1991) is a South Korean actress. She is best known for her roles in television series My First First Love (2019) and Woori the Virgin (2022).

== Career ==
Hong Ji-yoon made her debut in tvN's Criminal Minds in 2017, as Park In-hye. She also starred in Bad Guys 2.

She played the role of Oh Ji-ran in What's Wrong with Secretary Kim. She played a supporting role in Netflix's original series My First First Love with Ji Soo, Jung Chae-yeon and Jin Young. She made a cameo appeared as actress Ruby in My Absolute Boyfriend.

Hong Ji-yoon has also partaken in the drama My Country: The New Age which premiered in September 2019 on JTBC. In 2022, she starred in the SBS romantic comedy drama Woori the Virgin.

In January 2023, Hong signed with Ghost Studio.

== Filmography ==
=== Film ===
Year	Title	Role	Ref.
2018	Monstrum	Mother	
2022	Project Wolf Hunting	Eun-ji	

=== Television series ===
Year	Title	Role	Notes	Ref.
2017	Criminal Minds	Park In-hye		
2017	Bad Guys 2	Han So-yeong		
2018	Return	Bang Seon-Yeong		
2018	What's Wrong with Secretary Kim	Oh Ji-ran		
2019	My Absolute Boyfriend	Ruby		
2019	My Country: The New Age	Hwa-wol		
2022	Woori the Virgin	Lee Ma-Ri		
2022	Why Her	Park So-young	Cameo	

=== Web series ===
Year	Title	Role	Notes	Ref.
2019	My First First Love	Ryu Se-hyeon		
2023	Celebrity		Cameo	

== Awards and nominations ==
Name of the award ceremony, year presented, category, nominee of the award, and the result of the nomination
Award ceremony	Year	Category	Nominee / Work	Result	Ref.
SBS Drama Awards	2022	Best Supporting Actress in a Miniseries Romance/Comedy	Woori the Virgin	Nominated	
