= Shin Dong-wook =

South Korean actor (born 1982)

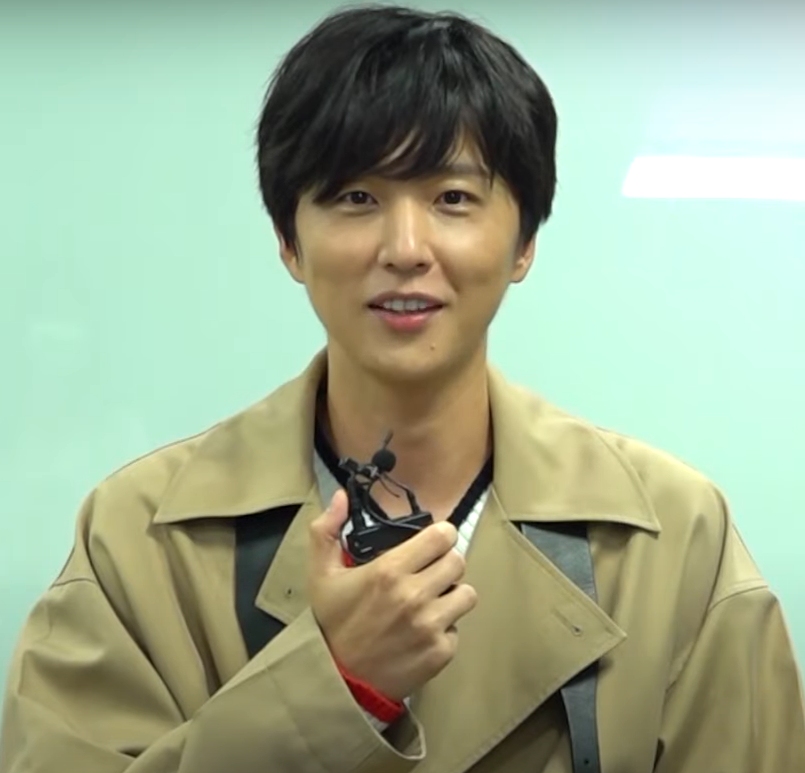
- Shin in 2022
- Born: Shin Hwa-shik; September 14, 1982 (age 44); Seoul, South Korea
- Education: Kookmin University - Theater and Film
- Occupation: Actor
- Years active: 2004–2010, 2017–present
- Agent: Snowball Entertainment
- Family: Kim Kibum (cousin)

Korean name
- Hangul: 신화식
- RR: Sin Hwasik
- MR: Sin Hwasik

Stage name
- Hangul: 신동욱
- RR: Sin Donguk
- MR: Sin Tonguk

Shin Dong-wook (Korean: 신동욱; born September 14, 1982), birth name Shin Hwa-shik, is a South Korean actor. He is best known for his leading roles in Soulmate and Cloud Stairs (both in 2006), and his supporting role in War of Money (2007).

== Career ==
In November 2016, Shin published his first novel, Writing, Space Journal about a man in a space elevator construction project that drifts into the galaxy, a love story between a cranky genius businessperson and a genius theoretical physicist. Soon after that, he appeared on TV for the first time in 6 years in a short video.

After a seven year hiatus in May 2017, Shin made his acting comeback with a supporting role in the drama The Guardians, in which he took a role of a Catholic priest. Later that year he was cast in the police procedural drama Live as a policeman.

In 2018, Shin took a main role in the romance drama Dae Jang Geum Is Watching alongside Kwon Yu-ri.

== Personal life ==
Shin stayed out of the public eye for 6 years, since 2011, when he was discharged early from mandatory military service upon diagnosis of a rare condition, complex regional pain syndrome (CRPS), a chronic disease that causes extreme bouts of pain without a known cause or cure. On May 24, 2017, Shin appeared as a guest in the Radio Star Episode 528 and assured his illness is under control.

In July 2018, Shin's agency confirmed that he is in a relationship with a Korean traditional medicine doctor who is nine years his junior who has been a long term fan of his.

== Filmography ==
=== Television series ===
Year	Title	Original title	Role	Notes/Ref.
2004	I'm Sorry, I Love You	미안하다, 사랑한다		Cameo (episode 1)
2004	If You Only Knew			
2004	Oh Feel Young	오!필승 봉순영		
2005	Hong Kong Express	홍콩 익스프레스	Joo Young-yuk	Credited as Shin Hwa-Shik
2005	Goodbye To Sadness	슬픔이여안녕		
2006	Soulmate	소울메이트	Dong Wook	
2006	Cloud Stairs	구름계단	Choi Jong-soo	
2007	War of Money	쩐의 전쟁	Ha Woo-Sung	
2008	On Air	온에어	Drama Actor	Cameo (episode 14)
2008	Keitai Deka Zenigata Kai (The Cellphone Detective)			guest appearance - season 2, ep 12
2008	Lottery Trio	복권3인조		
2010	Wish Upon a Star	별을 따다줘	Won Joon-ha	
2017	The Guardians	파수꾼	Lee Gwan-woo	
2018	Live	라이브	Choi Myung-ho	
2018	Dae Jang Geum Is Watching	대장금이 보고 있다	Han San-hae	
2020–2023	Dr. Romantic	낭만닥터 김사부	Bae Moon-jeong	Season 2–3
2020	My Unfamiliar Family	(아는 건 별로 없지만) 가족입니다	Im Gun-joo	
2021	Reflection of You	너를 닮은 사람	Jung Seon-woo	
2021–2022	Now, We Are Breaking Up	지금, 헤어지는 중입니다	Yoon Soo-wan	
2022	Woori the Virgin	오늘부터 우리는	Lee Kang-jae	

=== Film ===
- Yellow Hair 2 (2001)

=== Variety show ===
- Kko Kko Tours Single♥Single (KBS2, 2008)
- Tracking! X-Boyfriend (Mnet, 2007–2008)
- King of Mask Singer (MBC, 2017)

== Awards and nominations ==
Name of the award ceremony, year presented, category, nominee of the award, and the result of the nomination
Award ceremony	Year	Category	Nominee / Work	Result	Ref.
Andre Kim Best Star Awards	2007	New Star Award	Shin Dong-wook	Won	
SBS Drama Awards	2007	New Star Award	War of Money	Won	
SBS Drama Awards	2022	Best Couple Award	Shin Dong-wook (with Sung Hoon and Im Soo-hyang); Woori the Virgin	Nominated	
SBS Drama Awards	2022	Excellence Award, Actor in a Miniseries Romance/Comedy Drama	Woori the Virgin	Nominated	
