= Go Yoon =

South Korean actor

- Born: Kim Jong-min; September 12, 1988 (age 38); Busan, South Korea
- Other name: Ko Yoon
- Education: Dongguk University
- Occupation: Actor
- Years active: 2011–present
- Agent: NS ENM
- Father: Kim Moo-sung

Korean name
- Hangul: 김종민
- Hanja: 金鐘珉
- RR: Gim Jongmin
- MR: Kim Chongmin

Stage name
- Hangul: 고윤
- RR: Go Yun
- MR: Ko Yun

Go Yoon (born Kim Jong-min; September 12, 1988) is a South Korean actor. He is perhaps known for his roles in the television series Criminal Minds (2017) and Sisyphus: The Myth (2021).

== Filmography ==
=== Films ===
Year	Title	Role	Notes	Ref.
2011	Marrying the Mafia IV	Japanese fighter	Bit part	
2013	Iris 2: The Movie	Yoo Jin		
2014	Ode to My Father	Hyun Bong-hak		
2015	Love Forecast	Jae-joong		
2016	Operation Chromite	Oh Dae-soo		
2020	Steel Rain 2: Summit	Chief Han of the Presidential Protocol	Bit part	
2020	Farewell Restaurant	Hae-jin		
2023	Marrying the Mafia	Jongchill		

=== Television series ===
Year	Title	Role	Notes	Ref.
2013	Iris II: New Generation	Yoo Jin		
2014	Hotel King	Park Do-jin		
2014	Mr. Back	Kang Ki-chan		
2015	Love on a Rooftop	Jung Yoon-ho		
2016	Pied Piper	Jung Hyun-ho		
2016	Monster	Cha Woo		
2017	Criminal Minds	Lee Han		
2018	The Rich Son	Park Hyun-bin		
2019–2020	Queen: Love and War	Gae-pyung		
2021	Sisyphus: The Myth	Jung Hyun-ki		
2022	Adamas	Park Yo-won		
2023	Missing: The Other Side	Jung Ji-hoon	Season 2 Guest (episode 14)	
2024	Beauty and Mr. Romantic	Gong Jin-dan		

=== Web series ===
Year	Title	Role	Notes	Ref.
2018	Love in Memory	Noh Jin-woo		
2022	Stock Struck	Choi Jin-wook		
2022–2023	Big Bet	Choi Il-ho		
2024	Red Swan	Kim Yong-min		
