= Choi Hwa-jung =

South Korean entertainer (born 1961)

Choi Hwa-jeong
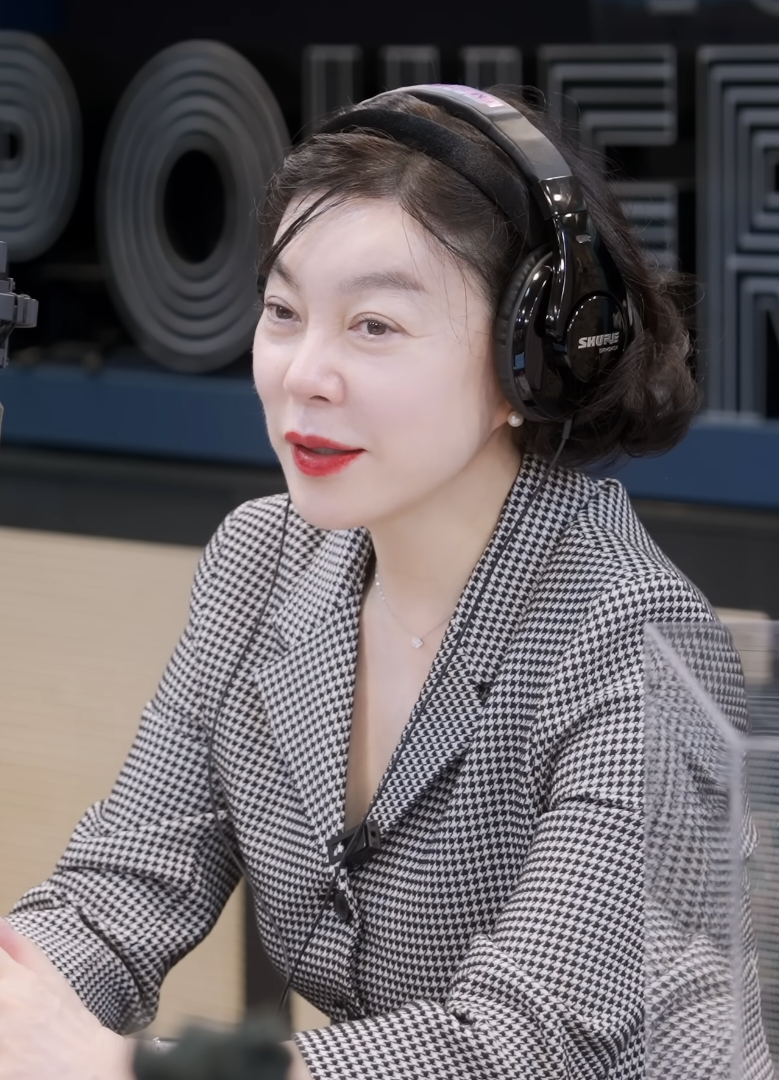
- Choi in May 2024
- Born: February 10, 1961 (age 65); Seoul, South Korea
- Occupations: Actress; radio presenter; television presenter

Korean name
- Hangul: 최화정
- Hanja: 崔化精
- RR: Choe Hwajeong
- MR: Ch'oe Hwajŏng

Choi Hwa-jeong (Korean: 최화정; born February 10, 1961) is a South Korean actress, radio presenter and television presenter. Her syndicated talk radio show Power Time, aired via SBS Power FM and its provincial affiliates since 1996.

== Filmography ==
=== Film ===
Year	Title	Role
1984	Divorce Court	
1985	Eve's Experience	
1986	A Long Journey, a Long Tunnel	Gan Ho-won
1986	Love Through the Whole Body	
1987	One-Winged Angel	
1987	Five Individuals	
1988	Prostitution	Hyeri
1988	The World of Women	Go A-ra
1990	Coming of Age	
1992	A Hyacinth Encircled by Vines	Dabi's sister
1994	No Need To Justify Yearning	Female worker
2012	Behind the Camera	
2014	Miss Granny	Radio DJ (cameo)
2015	Right Now, Wrong Then	Bang Soo-young
2019	Lucky Chan-sil	Representative Park (cameo)

Source: Korean Movie Database

=== Television series ===
Year	Title	Role
2001	Hotelier	Lee Soon-jung
2006	High Kick!	Beom's mother
2010	Kim Su-ro, The Iron King	Nok Sa-dan
2011	The Greatest Love	Representative Moon
2012	Can We Get Married?	Deul-rae
2013	One Warm Word	Choi An-na
2014	Wonderful Days	Ha Yeong-choon
2016	Don't Dare to Dream	Kim Tae-ra
2017	Hit the Top	Radio DJ (cameo)
2017	Temperature of Love	Lee Deul-lae
2018	Life on Mars	
2023	Stealer: The Treasure Keeper	Lee Chun-ja

Source: HanCinema

=== Television variety shows ===
Year	Title	Role	Ref.
2018–present	Taste of Love	Host	

=== Radio ===
Year	Title	Role	Ref.
1996–2024	Choi Hwa-jung's Power Time	DJ	
