= Lee Eugene =

South Korean actor (born 2004)

- Born: December 11, 2004 (age 21); South Korea
- Other names: Lee Yoo-jin, Yoo Jin-woo
- Occupation: Actor
- Years active: 2018–present
- Agent: Image Nine

Korean name
- Hangul: 이유진
- RR: I Yujin
- MR: I Yujin

Lee Eugene (Korean: 이유진; born December 11, 2004), formerly known by the stage name Yoo Jin-woo (Korean: 유진우) is a South Korean actor. He gained recognition for his role as Woo Soo-han in JTBC's television series Sky Castle.

== Filmography ==
=== Film ===
Year	Title	Role	Notes	Ref.
2018	Be the Reds			
2020	The Golden Holiday	young Hong Byung-soo		
2021	The Song in My Heart		Short film	

=== Television series ===
Year	Title	Role	Notes	Ref.
2018	Ms. Hammurabi	Student in a hardware store	Cameo	
2018	Sky Castle	Woo Soo-han		
2019	Pegasus Market	Jung Sang-tae	Ep. 1, 3 & 5	
2020	SF8	Tourist guide	Episode: "Joan's Galaxy"	
2021	Melancholia	Sung Yoo-chan		
2022	Why Her	young Gong Chan / Kim Dong-gu		
2023	The Escape of the Seven	Han Cheong-soo		

=== Web series ===
Year	Title	Role	Notes	Ref.
2020	Sweet Home	young Pyeon Sang-wook	Season 1	

=== Television show ===
Year	Title	Role	Notes	Ref.
2019	Produce X 101	Contestant	Finished 55th	

== Awards and nominations ==
Name of the award ceremony, year presented, category, nominee of the award, and the result of the nomination
Award ceremony	Year	Category	Nominee / Work	Result	Ref.
SBS Drama Awards	2022	Best Young Actor	Why Her	Won	
