= Lee Joo-woo =

South Korean actress (born 1990)

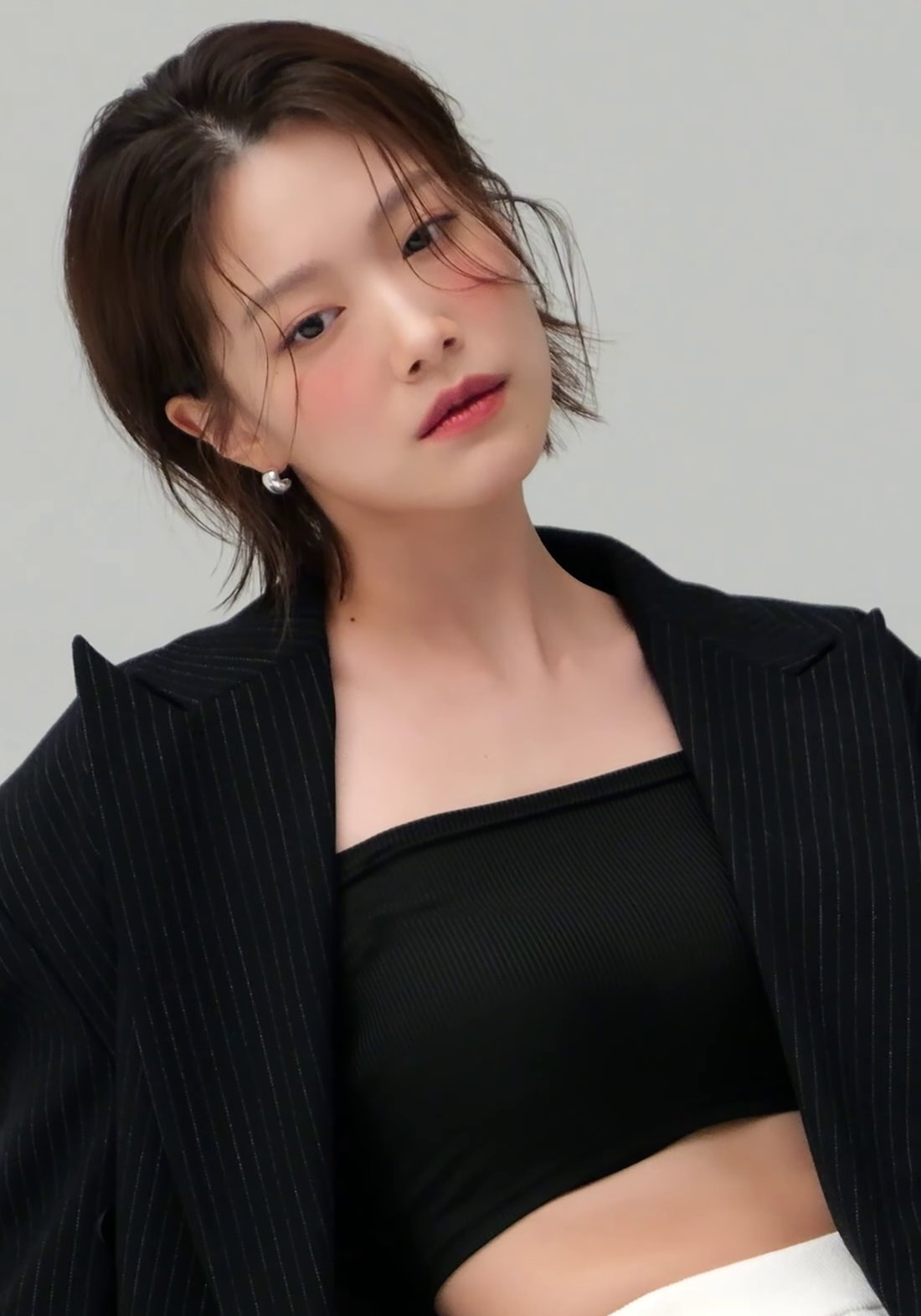
- Lee in July 2023
- Born: September 3, 1990 (age 36); Yongin, South Korea
- Education: Baekseok Arts University (Department of Music)
- Occupation: Actress
- Years active: 2012–present
- Agent: Echo Global Group

Korean name
- Hangul: 이주우
- RR: I Juu
- MR: I Chuu

Lee Joo-woo (Korean: 이주우; born September 3, 1990) is a South Korean actress. She is known for her supporting role in the MBC's television series Return of Fortunate Bok (2017), which earned her a MBC Drama Award nomination.

== Filmography ==
=== Film ===
Year	Title	Role	Notes	Ref.
2016	Mood of the Day	Information desk woman		
2017	Snowy Road	Ayako		
2017	To Be Sixteen	Soo-kyung		
2017	Calling	Jung Yoo-na	Cameo	

=== Television series ===
Year	Title	Role	Notes	Ref.
2014–2015	Schoolgirl Detectives	Choi Mi-rae		
2015	Hogu's Love	Min-ji		
2015	House of Bluebird	Park Joo-ri		
2015	Snowy Road	Ayako		
2015–2016	All is Well	Yang Na-ri		
2017	Return of Fortunate Bok	Shin Hwa-young		
2018	Welcome to Waikiki	Min Soo-ah	Season 1	
2018	Let's Eat 3	Lee Seo-yeon		
2019	The Running Mates: Human Rights	Lee Dal-sook		
2020	The Spies Who Loved Me	Kim Dong-ran		
2022	Why Her	Song Mi-rim		
2023	Stealer: The Treasure Keeper	Choi Min-woo		
2026	Mad Concrete Dreams	Go Joo-ran		

=== Web series ===
Year	Title	Role	Ref.
2021	Shh, Please Take Care of Him	Na Gong-joo	

=== Music video appearances ===
Year	Title	Artist	Ref.
2013	"Story of Someone I Know"	San E	
2013	"Break-Up Dinner"	San E	

== Musical theater ==
Year	Title	Role
2013–2014	Oh! While You Were Sleeping	Choi Min-hee

== Awards and nominations ==
Name of the award ceremony, year presented, category, nominee of the award, and the result of the nomination
Award ceremony	Year	Category	Nominee / Work	Result	Ref.
MBC Drama Awards	2017	Best Character Award, Fighting Spirit Acting	Return of Fortunate Bok	Nominated	
SBS Drama Awards	2022	Excellence Award, Actress in a Miniseries Genre/Fantasy Drama	Why Her	Nominated	
SBS Drama Awards	2022	Best Supporting Team	Why Her	Nominated	
