= Lee Seung-il (actor) =

South Korean actor

- Born: June 17, 1994 (age 32); South Korea
- Other name: Lee Seungil
- Education: High School Humanities
- Occupations: Actor; model
- Years active: 2019–present
- Agent: Different Company
- Known for: When I Was the Most Beautiful; At Eighteen; My Absolute Boyfriend

Lee Seung-il is a South Korean actor and model. He is known for his roles in dramas When I Was the Most Beautiful, Can Love Be Refunded, At Eighteen, My Absolute Boyfriend and he appeared in movies such as Lucky Monster, The Flatterer and The Labyrinth.

== Early life and education ==
He was born on June 7, 1994, in South Korea. In Middle School Lee Seung-il was interested in swimming at age four in third year but he dislocated his shoulder during a match and he quit swimming. Lee parents encouraged him for acting. He attended High School Humanities. After he completed his studies and he joined Different Company as a model and actor. He did modeling for various commercials of Samsung Electronics Samsung TV The Sero and Dungeon & Fighter Coming out! Arad Ranger.

== Career ==
In 2019, he made his acting debut in web series Love Can Be Refunded playing Hyun-su and also appeared in dramas At Eighteen and My Absolute Boyfriend. He also did modeling for Italian men's brand Benaco & Fontana.

The following year, in 2020, he appeared in dramas Twenty-Twenty, as Kwon Ki-jung When I Was the Most Beautiful as Song In-ho and he also appeared in movies Lucky Monster and The Flatterer.

In 2021, he appeared in drama Peng as Jeon Woo-sang and also appeared in horror movie The Labyrinth as No Dae-young.

== Personal life ==
Lee Seung-il already did his military service before making his debut as an actor and model and served in the military since 2018 at Republic of Korea Army Mark Army Marine Corps.

== Filmography ==
=== Television series ===
Year	Title	Role	Ref.
2019	My Absolute Boyfriend	Ma Gwi-hoon	
2019	At Eighteen	Joo Hyun-jang	
2020	When I Was the Most Beautiful	Song In-ho	
2021	Peng	Jeon Woo-sang	
2023	Stealer: The Treasure Keeper	Seung-il	

=== Web series ===
Year	Title	Role	Ref.
2019	Can Love Be Refunded	Hyun-su	
2020	Twenty-Twenty	Kwon Ki-jung	

=== Film ===
Year	Title		Role	Ref.
Year	English	Korean	Role	Ref.
2020	Lucky Monster	럭키 몬스터	Bully student	
2021	The Labyrinth	화이트데이: 귀멸의 퇴마학교	No Dae-young	
2022	The Flatterer	아부쟁이	Seung-il	

== Commercial advertisements ==
Year	Brand	Product	Ref.
2020	Samsung Electronics Samsung TV The Sero	The Sero Samsung	
2021	Dungeon & Fighter Coming out! Arad Ranger	Dungeon Fighter	
