= New Tales of Gisaeng =

2011 South Korean television series

- Promotional poster
- Also known as: New Gisaeng Story
- Genre: Romance, Melodrama
- Written by: Im Sung-han
- Directed by: Lee Young-hee; Son Moon-kwon
- Starring: Im Soo-hyang; Sung Hoon; Han Hye-rin
- Country of origin: South Korea
- Original language: Korean
- No. of episodes: 52

Production
- Producer: Oh Se-kang
- Running time: 60 minutes
- Production company: Golden Pine

Original release
- Network: Seoul Broadcasting System
- Release: 23 January – 17 July 2011

New Tales of Gisaeng (Korean: 신기생뎐; RR: Singisaengdyeon; also known as New Gisaeng Story) is a 2011 South Korean television series starring Im Soo-hyang, Sung Hoon, and Han Hye-rin. Written by Im Sung-han and directed by Son Moon-kwon, it aired on SBS from January 23 to July 17, 2011, on Saturdays and Sundays at 21:45 for 52 episodes. It is based on Lee Hyun-su's novel of the same name.

== Plot ==
"Gisaeng" was the Korean equivalent of a geisha or courtesan knowledgeable in poetry, dance, music, culture and politics, who entertained noblemen and royalty of the Joseon period. This series explores the premise that gisaeng still existed in modern-day Korea.

Dan Sa-ran (Im Soo-hyang) lost her mother at a young age, and never quite got along with her stepmother and stepsister. Despite her humble background, she carries herself with pride and grace, majoring in classical dance during college. Drawing the attention of Buyonggak's head gisaeng with her dancing talent and classic beauty, Sa-ran enters Korea's sole traditional gisaeng house, an exclusive establishment that serves only VIP guests. Ah Da-mo (Sung Hoon) is a cocky second-generation chaebol with his own set of daddy issues. He can't be bothered to give any woman the time of day... until he meets Sa-ran.

== Cast ==
=== Main characters ===
- Im Soo-hyang as Dan Sa-ran
- Sung Hoon as Ah Da-mo
- Han Hye-rin as Geum Ra-ra
- Kim Bo-yeon as Oh Hwa-ran
- Kim Hye-sun as Han Soon-deok
  - Jung Han-bi as young Soon-deok

=== Supporting characters ===
Dan family

- Baek Ok-dam as Dan Gong-joo
- Kim Joo-young as Dan Chul-soo
- Lee Sook as Ji Hwa-ja

Geum family

- Han Jin-hee as Geum Eo-san
  - Park Jin as young Eo-san
- Seo Woo-rim as Lee Hong-ah
- Lee Jong-nam as Jang Joo-hee
- Lee Dong-joon as Geum Kang-san
- Lee Dae-ro as Geum Shi-jo
- Lee Sang-mi as Shin Hyo-ri

Ah family

- Im Hyuk as Ah Soo-ra
- Kim Hye-jung as Cha Ra-ri
- Ahn Young-joo as Park Ae-ja

Buyonggak

- Lee Mae-ri as Lee Do-hwa
- Choi Sun-ja as Hwa-ran's mother
- Park Joon-myun as Noh Eun-ja
- Seo Dong-soo as Ma Dan-se
- Song Dae-kwan as Seo Saeng-kang
- Oh Ki-chan as Oh Bong-yi
- Kang Cho-hee as Han Song-yi
- Kim Yul as Baek Soo-jung
- Seol Yoon as Jang Soo-jin
- Yoon Ji-eun as Song Hye-eun
- Kim Eun-sun as Ye-rang
- Lee Sun-ah as Lee Ji-hyang
- Oh Ji-yeon as Kim-sshi
- Ha Na-kyung

Extended cast

- Jeon Ji-hoo as Son-ja
- Jin Ye-sol as Jin Joo-ah
- Lee Soo-jin as Sung Ah-mi
- Park Yoon-jae as Oh Jin-ahm
- Kim Ho-chang as Yoo Tae-young
- Michael Blunck as Kyle
- Shin Goo as Master Joong-bong
- Jun Sung-hwan as Master Jung-do
- Lee Hyo-jung as Ma Yi-joon (CEO Joon Entertainment) The Midas
- Kim Joon-hyung as Do-suk
- Son Ga-young as Choi Young-mim
- Won Jong-rye as Young-nim's mother
- Kim Sun-il as Min-jae
- Min Joon-hyun as manager

== Ratings ==
Episode #	Original broadcast date	Average audience share			
Episode #	Original broadcast date	TNmS Ratings		AGB Nielsen	
Episode #	Original broadcast date	Nationwide	Seoul National Capital Area	Nationwide	Seoul National Capital Area
1	23 January 2011	8.0%	9.9%	10.4%	12.2%
2	24 January 2011	9.9%	11.9%	12.4%	14.2%
3	29 January 2011	9.2%	10.7%	11.4%	13.2%
4	30 January 2011	8.3%	9.8%	9.4%	10.9%
5	5 February 2011	9.0%	11.3%	10.2%	11.3%
6	6 February 2011	8.9%	10.3%	10.8%	12.0%
7	12 February 2011	9.7%	12.1%	11.0%	12.0%
8	13 February 2011	9.0%	10.8%	10.9%	12.5%
9	19 February 2011	10.4%	12.1%	14.5%	16.3%
10	20 February 2011	9.0%	10.3%	13.6%	16.0%
11	26 February 2011	10.1%	11.4%	12.7%	14.4%
12	27 February 2011	10.1%	12.1%	13.7%	15.7%
13	5 March 2011	11.2%	13.0%	12.7%	14.4%
14	6 March 2011	10.5%	12.3%	13.7%	15.2%
15	12 March 2011	10.7%	12.8%	12.6%	14.3%
16	13 March 2011	11.5%	13.7%	13.4%	15.5%
17	19 March 2011	11.4%	14.0%	13.2%	15.4%
18	20 March 2011	11.0%	13.1%	14.4%	16.6%
19	26 March 2011	11.3%	13.1%	12.5%	14.1%
20	27 March 2011	10.8%	13.3%	13.0%	14.9%
21	2 April 2011	13.7%	15.9%	18.0%	20.2%
22	3 April 2011	15.6%	18.2%	18.7%	20.5%
23	9 April 2011	16.0%	18.7%	18.7%	21.0%
24	10 April 2011	14.8%	17.9%	19.2%	21.9%
25	16 April 2011	14.9%	16.9%	17.0%	18.4%
26	17 April 2011	15.7%	18.5%	18.5%	20.9%
27	23 April 2011	14.6%	17.2%	18.7%	21.0%
28	24 April 2011	15.1%	17.5%	19.3%	21.0%
29	1 May 2011	10.1%	11.8%	13.3%	14.9%
30	1 May 2011	15.7%	17.2%	19.0%	20.5%
31	7 May 2011	13.0%	14.3%	16.4%	16.9%
32	8 May 2011	14.8%	16.9%	18.3%	20.1%
33	14 May 2011	15.2%	18.5%	17.6%	19.6%
34	15 May 2011	16.4%	19.6%	19.1%	21.4%
35	21 May 2011	15.0%	17.3%	19.2%	21.8%
36	22 May 2011	16.5%	18.9%	19.3%	21.0%
37	28 May 2011	15.9%	18.7%	18.5%	19.8%
38	29 May 2011	16.3%	19.1%	20.2%	21.9%
39	4 June 2011	15.6%	19.1%	19.3%	20.2%
40	5 June 2011	15.9%	17.0%	19.4%	20.7%
41	11 June 2011	18.1%	21.0%	21.7%	22.9%
42	12 June 2011	19.3%	22.8%	22.3%	24.1%
43	18 June 2011	19.1%	20.9%	21.0%	22.0%
44	19 June 2011	19.6%	23.5%	23.1%	24.5%
45	25 June 2011	19.5%	22.2%	22.4%	24.3%
46	26 June 2011	20.3%	22.2%	25.0%	26.5%
47	2 June 2011	20.4%	23.3%	22.5%	23.2%
48	3 June 2011	20.9%	24.6%	24.4%	25.8%
49	9 June 2011	20.1%	20.8%	23.6%	24.7%
50	10 June 2011	21.1%	22.3%	24.7%	25.9%
51	16 June 2011	23.2%	25.1%	26.5%	28.3%
52	17 June 2011	24.0%	25.1%	28.3%	29.5%
Average		14.4%	16.6%	17.3%	19.0%

== Awards and nominations ==
Year	Award	Category	Recipient	Result
2011	4th Korea Drama Awards	Best New Actress	Im Soo-hyang	Won
2011	19th SBS Drama Awards	Special Award, Actor in a Weekend/Daily Drama	Im Hyuk	Nominated
2011	19th SBS Drama Awards	Special Award, Actor in a Weekend/Daily Drama	Han Jin-hee	Nominated
2011	19th SBS Drama Awards	Special Award, Actress in a Weekend/Daily Drama	Kim Hye-sun	Nominated
2011	19th SBS Drama Awards	New Star Award	Sung Hoon	Won
2011	19th SBS Drama Awards	New Star Award	Im Soo-hyang	Won
2012	48th Paeksang Arts Awards	Best New Actress	Im Soo-hyang	Nominated

== International broadcast ==
It aired in Japan on cable channel KNTV from September 9, 2012, to March 3, 2013, with reruns on cable channel BS Japan beginning February 20, 2013. In 2015, Hong Kong's HKTV also played this drama.
