= Hwang Dong-hyuk =

South Korean filmmaker (born 1971)

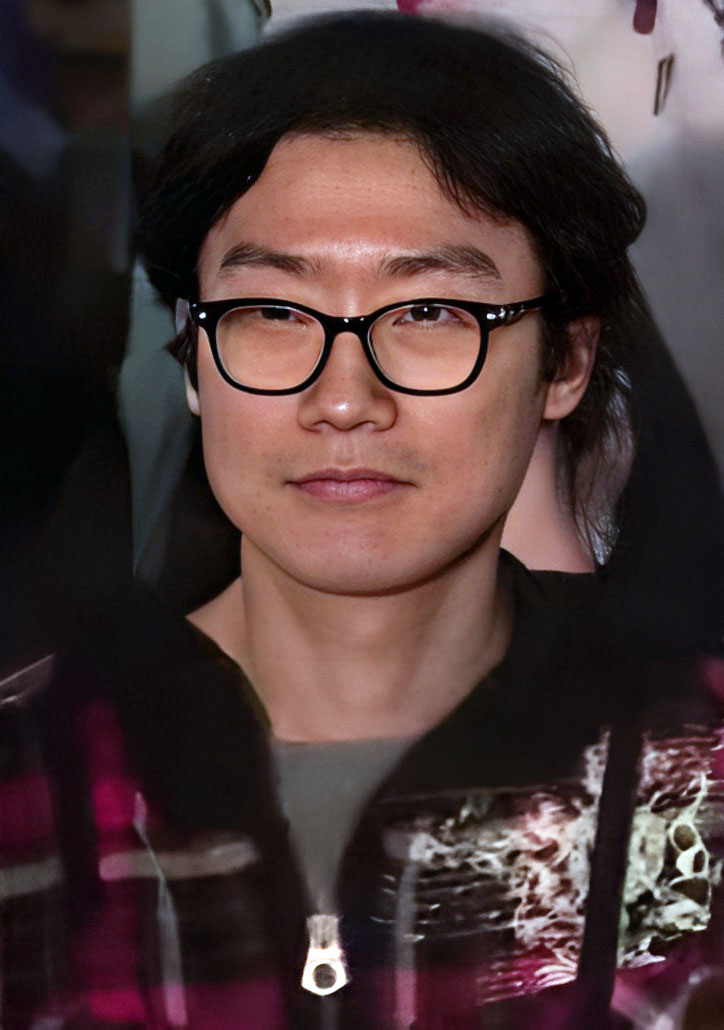
- Hwang in 2014
- Born: May 26, 1971 (age 55); Seoul, South Korea
- Other names: Pride of Ssangmun-dong, "Detective" Hwang [alias]
- Education: Seoul National University (BA); University of Southern California (MFA)
- Occupations: Film director; producer; screenwriter
- Years active: 2000–present
- Agent: Creative Artists Agency
- Honours: Geumgwan Order of Cultural Merit (2022)

Korean name
- Hangul: 황동혁
- Hanja: 黃東赫
- RR: Hwang Donghyeok
- MR: Hwang Tonghyŏk

Hwang Dong-hyuk (Korean: 황동혁; born May 26, 1971) is a South Korean filmmaker known for writing and directing the crime drama film Silenced (2011) and the creator of Netflix's Squid Game (2021–2025).

He won an Emmy for Outstanding Directing for a Drama Series in 2022 for directing the Squid Game episode "Red Light, Green Light", making him the first South Korean to win an Emmy in that category. Hwang is one of a few South Koreans who received the Geumgwan (1st Class) Order of Cultural Merit, the highest decoration awarded to those who have contributed to South Korean culture and arts, in 2022.

== Early life and education ==
Hwang Dong-hyuk was born and raised in Ssangmun-dong, Seoul, South Korea; he immersed himself in manhwa and manga, spending hours in comic book cafes. After he graduated from Seoul National University with a Bachelor of Arts in communications, he wrote and directed numerous short films including Our Sad Life and A Puff of Smoke. He then moved to Los Angeles to study for a Master of Fine Arts in Film Production at the University of Southern California.

== Career ==
=== 2000–2010: Short films and My Father ===
In 2000, Hwang started his filmmaking career and completed two short films Heaven & Hell and Desperation (2000). His graduation thesis film was Miracle Mile (2004), a short starring Karl Yune as a Korean-American illegal taxi driver who helps his fare, a young Korean woman (played by Hana Kim) search for her brother who was adopted by Americans 20 years ago. Miracle Mile screened at over 40 international film festivals and won several awards, including the Directors Guild of America Student Film Award and Student Emmy Award.

For his feature film debut, Hwang returned to the topic of adoption in My Father (2007). Based on the true story of Korean-American adoptee Aaron Bates, the film is about a U.S. Army soldier stationed in Korea who appears on national television to search for his birth parents, then finds his father on death row for murder. Kim Yeong-cheol played the father opposite lead actor Daniel Henney, whom Hwang decided to cast despite the latter being typecast as a heartthrob. Henney and Kim were praised for their acting, as was Hwang for his non-melodramatic handling of forgiveness and acceptance, intertwined with issues of cultural identity and the death penalty.

=== 2011–2020: Commercial success with The Crucible (Silenced), Miss Granny and The Fortress ===
Hwang's second film became one of the biggest stories in Korean cinema in 2011. Based on a novel by Gong Ji-young and starring Gong Yoo and Jung Yu-mi, The Crucible (also known as Silenced) depicts real-life events at the Gwangju Inhwa School for the deaf where young students were cruelly treated and sexually abused by their teachers and administrators. Hwang said he deliberated for about a month whether or not he should make the film, but decided to do it because "It had to be told." Hwang said, "I thought about two things when making this film. First, I wanted to let the world know about this horrific incident. Secondly, I wanted to expose the structural problems of society as revealed during the process of how the case was buried. The issues portrayed in the movie -- sexual violence against children, corrupt ties between police and influential families, negligence of duty by civil servants -- is not fictitious, but can be seen regularly on the daily news." The movie became a box-office hit in Korea, attracting 4.7 million viewers. But more significantly, it provoked widespread public anger and commentary, such that the case was reopened and lawmakers passed the "Dogani Bill" which abolishes the statute of limitations for sex crimes against minors and the disabled. Hwang said, "I took up filmmaking because I was so frustrated by all these unresolved social issues I saw. We can see through films how much we are changed by the world. You can't change society with just one movie, but looking at the repercussion of the release of this film, we can think about the power film has in terms of positively affecting society."

In a significant departure from his previous films, Hwang's third feature Miss Granny (titled Suspicious Girl in Korean) focuses on a 74-year-old woman who regains the appearance of her 20-year-old self (played by Na Moon-hee and Shim Eun-kyung, respectively), in a movie that straddles comedy, family drama, music and romance. Hwang said at the 2014 film's press conference, "With My Father and Silenced, I always seemed to be making social films with dark subject matter, but in reality, I am a fun person. This time I really wanted to make a happy and light film." Strong word of mouth propelled Miss Granny to the top of the box office chart, with more than 8.65 million admissions.

Based on Kim Hoon's novel Namhansanseong (the Korean title for the movie as well), The Fortress stars Lee Byung-hun and Kim Yoon-seok as rival advisors to King Injo at a critical moment during the Second Manchu invasion of Korea. A subtle tour de force in a totally different genre from Hwang's previous movies, it claimed both a popular and critical success with 3.8 million tickets sold in Korea, a distribution to 28 countries, and many awards across Asia.

=== 2021–present: International acclaim with Squid Game ===
Around 2008, Hwang had tried unsuccessfully to get investment for a different movie script that he had written, and he, his mother, and his grandmother had to take out loans to stay afloat, but still struggled amid the debt crisis within the country. (Note: Following the bankruptcy of Lehman Brothers in September 2008 and as part of the 2008 financial crisis, banks in South Korea had tried to help provide external investments to stabilize foreign currency rates. As the crisis worsened into 2009, these stabilization attempts had failed, causing a reversing of money from the country, and forcing banks to drastically increase interest rates and seek high-risk short-term loans made to citizens to try to recover.) He spent his free time in a Manhwabang (South Korean manga cafe) reading Japanese survival manga such as Battle Royale, Liar Game and Gambling Apocalypse: Kaiji. Hwang compared the characters' situation in these works to his own current situation and considered the idea of being able to join such a survival game to win money to get him out of debt, leading him to write a film script on that concept throughout 2009. Hwang stated, "I wanted to write a story that was an allegory or fable about modern capitalist society, something that depicts an extreme competition, somewhat like the extreme competition of life. But I wanted it to use the kind of characters we've all met in real life." Hwang feared the storyline was "too difficult to understand and bizarre" at the time. Hwang tried to sell his story to various Korean production groups and actors, but had been told it was too grotesque and unrealistic. Hwang put this script aside without any takers, and over the next ten years successfully completed three other films, including the crime drama film Silenced (2011) and the historical drama film The Fortress (2017).

In the 2010s, Netflix had seen a large growth in viewership outside of North America, and started investing in productions in other regions, including Korea. In 2018, Ted Sarandos, co-CEO of Netflix, stated that they were looking for more successes from overseas productions: "The exciting thing for me would be if the next Stranger Things came from outside America. Right now, historically, nothing of that scale has ever come from anywhere but Hollywood." Netflix had opened up a division in Asia in 2018, and while they were still operating out of temporary leased office space in Seoul, Hwang brought his script to their attention. Kim Minyoung, one of Netflix's content officers for the Asian regions, recognized Hwang's talent from The Fortress and his other films, and upon seeing his script for Squid Game, knew they needed it for the service. Kim said "[W]e were looking for shows that were different from what's traditionally 'made it,' and Squid Game was exactly it". In September 2019 Netflix formally announced that they would produce Hwang's work as an original series. Netflix's Bela Bajaria, head of global television operations, said of their interest in Hwang's work that "we knew it was going to be big in Korea because it had a well-regarded director with a bold vision", and that "K-Dramas also travel well across Asia". Regarding his return to the project, Hwang commented, "It's a sad story. But the reason why I returned to the project is because the world 10 years from then has transformed to a place where these unbelievable survival stories are so fitting, and I found that this is the time when people will call these stories intriguing and realistic." Hwang further believed that the COVID-19 pandemic impacted the economic disparity between classes in South Korea, and said that "All of these points made the story very realistic for people compared to a decade ago".

With the Netflix order, the film concept was expanded out to a nine-episode series. Kim stated that there was "so much more than what was written in the 120-minute format. So we worked together to turn it into a series." Hwang said he was able to expand the script so that it "could focus on the relationships between people [and] the stories that each of the people had". Initially, Netflix had named the season Round Six, rather than Squid Game as Hwang had suggested; according to Netflix's vice president for content in Asia Kim Minyoung, while they knew that the name "squid game" would be familiar to Korean viewers from the children's game, it "wouldn't resonate because not many people would get it", and opted to use Round Six as it self-described the nature of the competition. It has been titled as such in Brazil. As production continued, Hwang pushed on the service to use Squid Game instead; its cryptic name and unique visuals helped to draw in curious viewers, according to Kim. At the time that Hwang wrote the season, his goal was to have the season reach the most-watched show in Netflix in the United States for at least one day. Hwang had initially written the season as eight episodes, which was comparable to other Netflix shows, but found that the material for the last episode was longer than he planned, so it was split into two. Lee Jung-jae, who portrays Seong Gi-hun, leads an ensemble cast in the series.

Due to the stress of writing and producing the first series of nine episodes himself, Hwang initially had no immediate plans to write a second season to Squid Game, and did not have well-developed plans for a follow-up story and said that if he were to write one, he would likely need a staff of writers and directors to help him. However, with the immense popularity of the show, Hwang later opened about the possibility of a second season in 2021, telling CNN, "There's nothing confirmed at the moment, but so many people are enthusiastic that I'm really contemplating it." Hwang also said in an interview with The Times that a second season may focus more on the story of the Front Man as well as incorporating more about the police: "I think the issue with police officers is not just an issue in Korea. I see it on the global news that the police force can be very late in acting on things—there are more victims or a situation gets worse because of them not acting fast enough. This was an issue that I wanted to raise." He added that he also wanted to explore the relationship between antagonist Front Man (Lee Byung-hun) and police detective Hwang Jun-ho (Wi Ha-joon), as well as the background of the salesman character (portrayed by Gong Yoo). Speaking about the games that appear in the season, Hwang said "They are once again simple children's games that a lot of kids in Korea grew up playing. I remember being on set and being reminded of my childhood days" but he also wanted to open up the games to be more universally recognized this time "In many different countries around the world, there will be some kind of version similar to these games that you probably have played as a child,...They're going to be both very easy to understand and play, and very fun." In 2022, Kevin Yorn represented Hwang in negotiations for the second and third seasons of the series. The second season was released on December 26, 2024, with the third and final season released on June 27, 2025.

Hwang won an Emmy for Outstanding Directing for a Drama Series in 2022 for directing the Squid Game episode "Red Light, Green Light", making him the first South Korean to win an Emmy in that category. Hwang received the Geumgwan Order of Cultural Merit from President Yoon Suk Yeol, which is the highest decoration awarded to those who have contributed to culture and arts. Due to Squid Game's success, Netflix brought Hwang's last films Silenced, Miss Granny, and The Fortress to the service in the United States and other countries. Hwang had also worked with Netflix to create a mockumentary inspired by Squid Game's success, titled The Best Show on the Planet. Hwang said the comedy was based on his own personal experience of being pushed into the spotlight due to the rapid success of Squid Game. In 2022, Killing Old People Club, a feature film based on the writings of Umberto Eco, was announced as Hwang's next project.

== Filmography ==
| Year | Title | Director | Writer | Producer | Notes |
|---|---|---|---|---|---|
| 2000 | Our Sad Life | Yes | Yes | No | Short film |
| 2000 | A Puff of Smoke | Yes | Yes | No | Short film |
| 2000 | Heaven & Hell | Yes | No | No | Short film |
| 2000 | Desperation | Yes | Yes | Yes | Short film |
| 2000 | I Love Ultra Lotto | No | No | No | Short film, cinematographer, editor |
| 2004 | Big Time | No | No | No | Short film, production assistant |
| 2004 | Miracle Mile | Yes | Yes | No | Short film, editor |
| 2005 | Truck Stop Diner | No | No | No | Short film, actor, grip |
| 2007 | My Father | Yes | Yes | No | Adapted screenplay |
| 2011 | Silenced | Yes | Yes | No | |
| 2014 | Miss Granny | Yes | No | No | |
| 2017 | The Fortress | Yes | Yes | No | |
| 2020 | Collectors | No | No | Yes | Adapted screenplay |
| 2021–2025 | Squid Game | Yes | Yes | Yes | Netflix original series, creator; Season 3, episode 6 cameo |
| TBA | K.O. Club | Yes | Yes | TBA | |

== Accolades ==
=== Awards and nominations ===
Name of the award ceremony, year presented, category, nominee of the award, and the result of the nomination
| Award ceremony | Year | Category | Nominee / Work | Result | Ref. |
|---|---|---|---|---|---|
| Baeksang Arts Awards | 2018 | Best Director | The Fortress | Nominated | |
| Baeksang Arts Awards | 2022 | Best Director | Squid Game | Won | |
| Baeksang Arts Awards | 2022 | Best Screenplay | Squid Game | Nominated | |
| Beautiful Artist Award (Shin Young-kyun Arts and Culture Foundation) | 2021 | Film Artist Award | Hwang Dong-hyuk | Won | |
| Blue Dragon Awards | 2007 | Best New Director | My Father | Nominated | |
| Blue Dragon Awards | 2011 | Best Director | Silenced | Nominated | |
| Blue Dragon Awards | 2011 | Best Screenplay | Silenced | Nominated | |
| Blue Dragon Awards | 2014 | Best Director | Miss Granny | Nominated | |
| Blue Dragon Awards | 2017 | Best Director | The Fortress | Nominated | |
| Blue Dragon Awards | 2017 | Best Screenplay | The Fortress | Won | |
| Buil Film Awards | 2018 | Best Director | The Fortress | Nominated | |
| Buil Film Awards | 2018 | Best Screenplay | The Fortress | Nominated | |
| Chunsa Film Art Awards | 2018 | Best Director | The Fortress | Won | |
| Critics Choice Awards Asian Pacific Cinema & Television | 2022 | Director Award for TV | Squid Game | Won | |
| Director's Cut Awards | 2022 | Best Director in series | Squid Game | Won | |
| Director's Cut Awards | 2022 | Best Screenplay in series | Squid Game | Won | |
| Director's Cut Awards | 2026 | Best Director in series | Squid Game season 3 | Nominated | |
| Grand Bell Awards | 2018 | Best Director | The Fortress | Nominated | |
| Grand Bell Awards | 2018 | Best Screenplay | The Fortress | Nominated | |
| Gotham Awards | 2021 | Breakthrough Series – Long Form | Hwang Dong-hyuk (with Kim Ji-yeon) | Won | |
| Hollywood Critics Association TV Awards | 2022 | Best Directing in a Streaming Series, Drama | "Red Light, Green Light" | Nominated | |
| Hollywood Critics Association TV Awards | 2022 | Best Writing in a Streaming Series, Drama | "One Lucky Day" | Nominated | |
| Korea Image Award | 2022 | Stepping Stone Award | Hwang Dong-hyuk | Won | |
| Korean Association of Film Critics Awards | 2017 | Best Director | The Fortress | Won | |
| Max Movie Awards | 2015 | Best Director | Miss Granny | Nominated | |
| Pony Chung Foundation Innovation Award | 2022 | Pony Chung Innovation Award | Hwang Dong-hyuk | Won | |
| Primetime Emmy Awards | 2022 | Outstanding Directing for a Drama Series | "Red Light, Green Light" | Won | |
| Primetime Emmy Awards | 2022 | Outstanding Writing for a Drama Series | "One Lucky Day" | Nominated | |
| Primetime Emmy Awards | 2022 | Outstanding Drama Series | Squid Game (as executive producer) | Nominated | |
| Visionary Awards (Note: Visionary Awards, which started in 2020, selects and awards people who lead roles in the Korean entertainment industry. It highlights the meaning and achievements of a person whose chosen trend keywords penetrated the entertainment industry, including broadcasting, movies, music, and performances, and presents the next vision of the cultural sector with outstanding achievements and influence.) | 2021 | 2021 Visionary | Hwang Dong-hyuk | Won | |
| Udine Far East Film Festival | 2012 | Audience Award | Silenced | Won | |
| Udine Far East Film Festival | 2012 | Black Dragon Audience Award | Silenced | Won | |

=== Listicles ===
Name of publisher, year listed, name of listicle, and placement
| Organization | Year | Award | Ref. |
|---|---|---|---|
| Bloomberg Businessweek | 2021 | 50 People of the Year | |
| The Straits Times (Singapore) | 2021 | The Straits Times Asian of the Year | |
| Gold House (Note: The A100 List honours the most impactful Asians and Asian American & Pacific Islanders (AAPIs) in culture every May for AAPI Heritage Month. Gold House "champions trailblazing members of the AAPI community and their transformative contributions to entertainment, fashion, lifestyle, technology, business, social activism and politics from the past year".) | 2022 | A100 List (with Squid Games Creator & Stars) | |
| Time | 2022 | The 100 Most Influential People of 2022 | |
| Korea Newspaper Journalists Association | 2026 | K-Culture 100 Great Koreans Awards | |

=== State honors ===
(Order of Cultural Merit, 1st Class, 2022)
