= Dogani =

Dogani may refer to:

- Đogani, Serbian pop-folk duo
- Dogani, Jajce, a village in Bosnia and Herzegovina
- The Crucible (novel), 2009 South Korean novel by Gong Ji-young
- Silenced (film), 2011 film based on Gong's novel
