= Gong Yoo =

South Korean actor (born 1979)

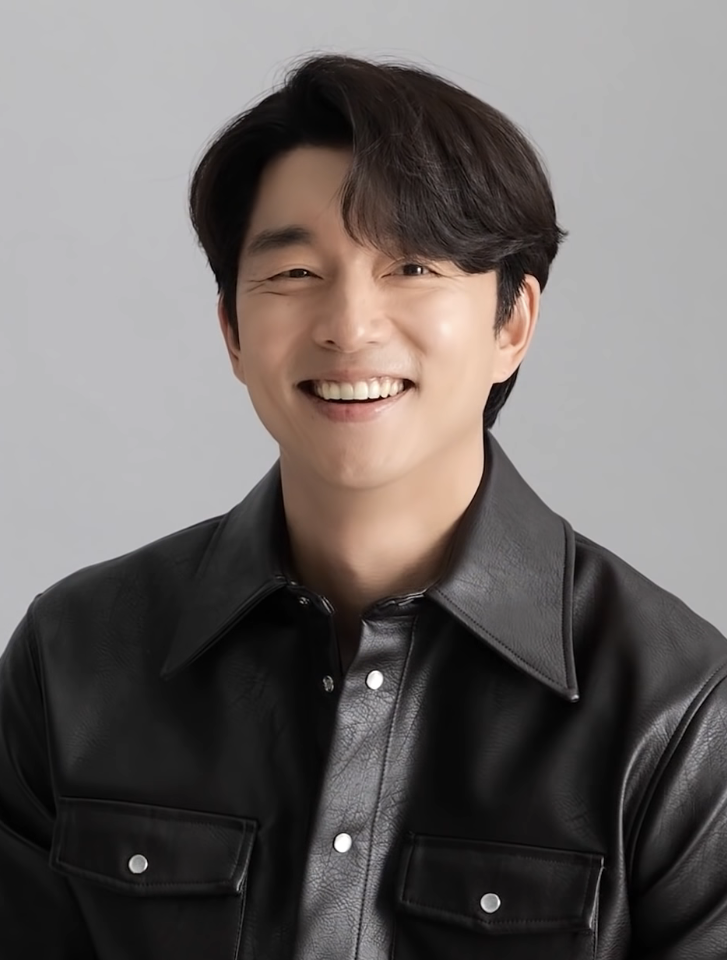
- Gong in September 2021
- Born: Gong Ji-cheol; July 10, 1979 (age 47); Busan, South Korea
- Education: Kyung Hee University
- Occupation: Actor
- Years active: 2001–present
- Agent: Management SOOP

Korean name
- Hangul: 공지철
- Hanja: 孔地哲
- RR: Gong Jicheol
- MR: Kong Chich'ŏl

Stage name
- Hangul: 공유
- Hanja: 孔劉
- RR: Gongyu
- MR: Kongyu
- Website: msoopent.com

Signature
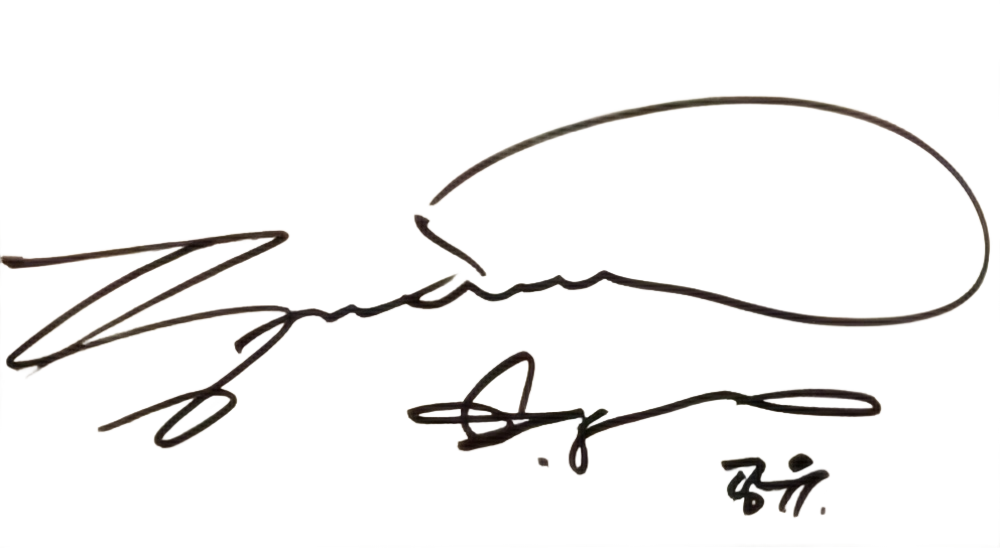

Gong Ji-cheol (Korean: 공지철; born July 10, 1979), known professionally as Gong Yoo (공유), is a South Korean actor. He is known for his starring roles in the television series Coffee Prince (2007), Guardian: The Lonely and Great God (2016–2017), the Netflix series Squid Game (2021–2025), and the films Silenced (2011), The Suspect (2013), Train to Busan (2016), and The Age of Shadows (2016).

== Early life and education ==
Gong Ji-cheol was born on July 10, 1979, in Busan, South Korea. He is the second child and only son of Gong Won and Yoo Myung-joo. His father attended Busan Sango, a baseball academy, and was a manager of the Lotte Giants from 1983 to 1985. Gong attended Dongin High School, and pursued undergraduate studies at Kyung Hee University's Department of Theater and Film.

A 1996 edition of Gokbu Gong clan's genealogy book in Korea recorded the ancestry of Gong Yoo, under the name "Gong Ji-cheol", who was listed as a 79th-generation descendant of ancient Chinese philosopher Confucius; his mother's bongwan is Paechon, from a cadet branch of the Gangneung Yoo clan, who claimed to be Goryeo descendants of Emperor Gaozu of the Han dynasty. In 2009, the 5th revision of Confucius' family tree was published in China; however, while thousands of Korean members from the Gokbu Gong clan are included, Gong Yoo and his relatives are not listed in this official genealogy book.

== Career ==
=== 2001–2004: Beginnings ===
Gong Yoo graduated from Kyung Hee University with a B.A. degree in theater. In 2000, he started his show business career as a video jockey on Mnet and debuted as an actor in the TV series School 4 in 2001. Thereafter, Gong did a number of supporting roles in dramas and movies and also hosted the music program Music Camp in 2004.

=== 2005–2007: Coffee Prince and breakthrough ===
In 2005, he landed his first lead role in SBS's Hello My Teacher opposite Gong Hyo-jin. This was followed by the romance melodrama One Fine Day in 2006.

Gong was then cast in MBC's romantic comedy Coffee Prince opposite Yoon Eun-hye, which became his breakout role. The popularity of the drama not only solidified his status as a leading man, but also made him a hallyu star.

=== 2008–2015: Military enlistment and comeback ===
On January 14, 2008, Gong enlisted for the mandatory service, and was discharged on December 8, 2009. He did eight months of frontline active service in Cheorwon and was transferred to the Defense Media Agency, where he served in the public relations department and hosted as a DJ for the army radio station.

He made his comeback in the romantic comedy Finding Mr. Destiny, which was a medium box office hit in Korea.

He then initiated and pursued the production of a theatrical adaptation of Gong Ji-young's novel The Crucible, a congratulatory gift from his senior for his promotion during enlistment. This movie was internationally released under the title Silenced. Upon its release on September 22, 2011, the film sparked public outrage. This led to a reopening of the investigations into the incidents on which the novel and film are based. Public demand for legislative reform reached the National Assembly, where a revised bill to target sex crimes against minors and the disabled, dubbed the Dogani Bill after the Korean title of the film, was successfully passed in late October 2011.

Gong then starred opposite Lee Min-jung in the romantic-comedy series Big written by the Hong sisters. The drama was well received, although it was criticized for its ending.

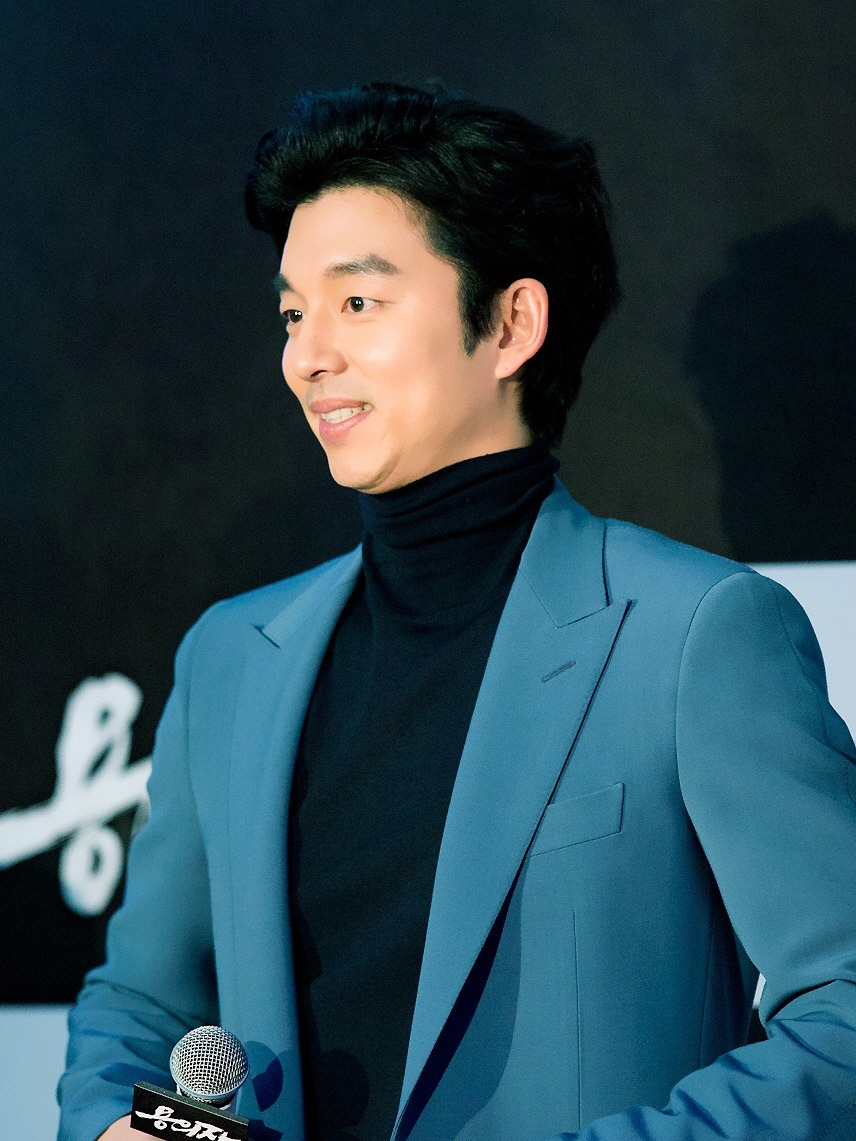
Gong in December 2013

In 2013, he returned to the big screen, after a two-year gap, in the movie The Suspect. He played an elite North Korean spy who defects after being betrayed by his country. In November 2013, Gong was appointed as a special representative of the United Nations Children's Fund (UNICEF) in Korea, in conjunction with a celebration of the 24th year since the Convention on the Rights of the Child (CRC) was adopted. Following his appointment, he has visited countries around the world to raise awareness of the situation of children in underdeveloped countries.

On July 7, 2014, Gong was named as an ambassador for the National Tax Service (NTS), alongside actress Ha Ji-won. The pair modeled for promotional posters and took part in street campaigns that encourage honest tax payment in support of the NTS.

=== 2016–present: Career resurgence ===
Gong experienced a new high in his career with consecutive hit works in 2016. His first film in 2016 was the melodrama A Man and a Woman alongside Jeon Do-yeon. He then starred in the hugely successful zombie blockbuster Train to Busan, which surpassed 11 million admissions in South Korea. Also that year, he starred in another box office hit The Age of Shadows, which surpassed 6 million admissions in two weeks.

In December 2016, Gong returned to television in Kim Eun-sook's fantasy-romance drama Guardian: The Lonely and Great God, playing the titular goblin. The drama was a massive hit and Gong won Best Actor at the Baeksang Awards for his performance.

In 2018, Gong was cast in the feminist film Kim Ji-young, Born 1982, which is his third collaboration with actress Jung Yu-mi (after Silenced and Train to Busan), Gong plays the role of Kim Ji-young's husband.

In March 2020, Gong confirmed to make a special appearance in Kim Tae-yong's film Wonderland.

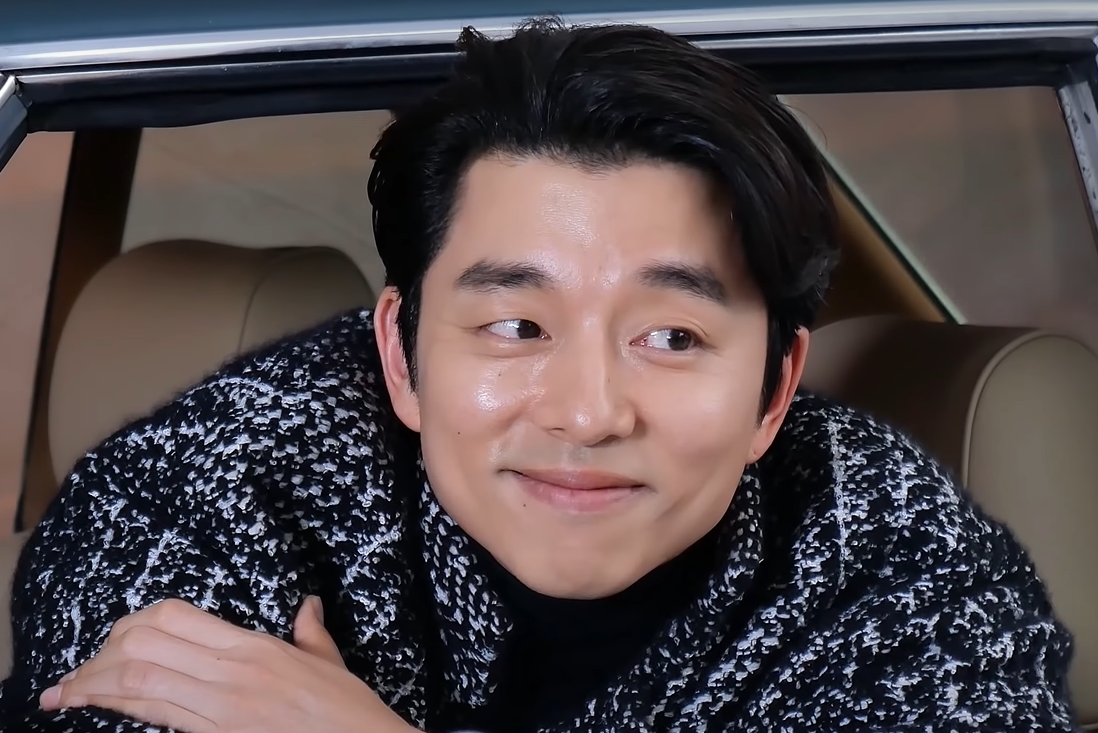
Gong in October 2021

In 2021, Gong starred in Lee Yong-ju's action thriller film Seo Bok alongside Park Bo-gum. Gong plays a former intelligence agent who is caught up in the chase of catching the first human clone to uncover the secret to eternal life. Later that year, he appeared as the Recruiter (a.k.a. the Salesman) in the first season of Squid Game, a role he reprised in the first episode of the second season in 2024. His brief appearance in the second season received positive reviews from fans on social media.

In December 2021, Gong appeared as team leader Han Yoon-jae alongside Bae Doona, Lee Joon, Kim Sun-young, and others in the Netflix original sci-fi thriller series The Silent Sea. Set in a distant dystopian future where Earth faces acute water shortage, the series follows an expedition team to an abandoned station on the moon. The fan response to the series was mixed, but it topped Netflix's global charts to become the most-watched non-English series in its second week. The Forbes review called it one of Netflix's "best sci-fi series to date."

In 2024, Gong starred in the mystery melodrama television series The Trunk opposite Seo Hyun-jin. Written by Park Eun-young and directed by Kim Kyu-tae, it is based on the novel of the same name by Kim Ryeo-ryeong about two people under a one-year marriage contract and a mysterious trunk. Gong played Han Jeong-won, a music producer.

== Filmography ==
Key
†	Denotes films that have not yet been released

=== Film ===
Year	Title	Role	Notes	Ref.
2003	My Tutor Friend	Lee Jong-soo		
2004	Spy Girl	Choi Ko-bong		
2004	Superstar Mr. Gam	Park Chul-so	Cameo	
2004	S Diary	Yoo-in		
2005	She's on Duty	Kang No-young		
2007	Like a Dragon	Park Chul	Japanese film	
2010	Finding Mr. Destiny	Han Gi-joon		
2011	Silenced	Kang In-ho		
2013	The Suspect	Ji Dong-chul		
2016	A Man and a Woman	Ki-hong		
2016	Train to Busan	Seok-woo		
2016	The Age of Shadows	Kim Woo-jin		
2019	Kim Ji-young: Born 1982	Jung Dae-hyun		
2021	Seo Bok	Min Gi-Heon		
2024	Wonderland	Sung-joon	Cameo	
2025	Love Untangled	Cafe Owner	Cameo	

=== Television series ===
Year	Title	Role	Notes	Ref.
2001	School 4	Hwang Tae-young	Episode 29–48	
2002	Whenever the Heart Beats	Park Chan-ho		
2002	Hard Love	Seo Kyung-chul		
2003	20 Years	Seo Joon		
2003	Best Theater: Flying Saucer	Ki Jin	Episode 533	
2003	Screen	Kim Joon-pyo		
2003	My Room, Your Room	Kim Sung-joon	SayClub Internet Drama	
2005	Hello My Teacher	Park Tae-in		
2006	One Fine Day	Seo Gun		
2007	Coffee Prince	Choi Han-kyul		
2012	Big	Seo Yoon-jae / Kang Kyung-joon		
2013	Dating Agency: Cyrano	Magician	Cameo (Episode 9)	
2016–2017	Guardian: The Lonely and Great God	Goblin / Kim Shin		
2021–2024	Squid Game	The Recruiter	Guest cast (season 1–2); 3 episodes	
2021	The Silent Sea	Han Yoon-jae		
2024	The Trunk	Han Jeong-won		
TBA	Tantara †	Dong-gu	Post-production	

=== Music video appearances ===
Year	Title	Artist	Ref.
2014	"How I Am"	Kim Dong-ryul	

=== Hosting ===
Year	Title	Notes	Ref.
2004	Music Camp	with Han Ji-hye; January 10–July 3, 2004	
2008–2009	Best Soldiers' Songs	with Jo Eun-bit; Episodes 155–186	

=== Radio shows ===
Year	Title	Role	Notes	Ref.
2008–2009	20 O'Clock, When Gong Yoo Is Waiting	DJ	371 episodes	

== Discography ==
=== Soundtrack appearances ===
List of singles, with year, and album
Title	Year	Album	Ref.
"Because It's You"	2012	Big OST	

== Accolades ==
=== Awards and nominations ===
Name of the award ceremony, year presented, category, nominee of the award, and the result of the nomination
Award ceremony	Year	Category	Nominee / Work	Result	Ref.
Asian Film Awards	2017	Best Actor	Train to Busan	Nominated	
Baeksang Arts Awards	2012	Best Actor – Film	Silenced	Nominated	
Baeksang Arts Awards	2017	Best Actor – Television	Guardian: The Lonely and Great God	Won	
BloodGuts UK Horror Awards	2017	Best Actor	Train to Busan	Nominated	
Blue Dragon Film Awards	2011	Best Leading Actor	Silenced	Nominated	
Blue Dragon Film Awards	2011	Popular Star Award	Silenced	Won	
Brand Customer Loyalty Award	2020	Advertising Model	Gong Yoo	Won	
Brand of the Year Awards	2017	Actor of the Year	Guardian: The Lonely and Great God	Won	
Chunsa Film Art Awards	2014	Best Actor	The Suspect	Nominated	
Chunsa Film Art Awards	2017	Best Actor	Train to Busan	Nominated	
DramaFever Awards	2017	Best Actor	Guardian: The Lonely and Great God	Won	
DramaFever Awards	2017	Best Couple	Gong Yoo (with Kim Go-eun); Guardian: The Lonely and Great God	Won	
Fangoria Chainsaw Awards	2017	Best Actor	Train to Busan	Nominated	
Fashionista Awards	2017	Best Fashionista – TV & Film Division	Guardian: The Lonely and Great God	Nominated	
iHorror Awards	2017	Best Actor	Train to Busan	Nominated	
KBS Drama Awards	2002	Best New Actor	Hard Love	Nominated	
KBS Drama Awards	2012	Excellence Award, Actor in a Miniseries	Big	Nominated	
Korea Advertisers Association Awards	2017	Best Model Award	Gong Yoo	Won	
Korea Culture and Entertainment Awards	2014	Best Actor	The Suspect	Won	
Korea Film Actors Association Awards	2016	Grand Prize (Daesang)	A Man and a Woman	Won	
MBC Drama Awards	2006	Special Award, Actor in a Miniseries	One Fine Day	Won	
MBC Drama Awards	2007	Excellence Award, Actor	Coffee Prince	Won	
Mnet 20's Choice Awards	2007	Best Style	Gong Yoo	Won	
SBS Drama Awards	2003	New Star Award	Screen	Won	
SBS Drama Awards	2005	Excellence Award, Actor in a Miniseries	Hello My Teacher	Nominated	
Seoul Creative Festival of Film Advertising	2017	Model of the Year	Gong Yoo	Won	

=== State honors ===
Name of country, year given, and name of honor
Country or Organization	Year	Honor or Award	Ref.
National Tax Service	2014	Presidential Commendation	

=== Listicles ===
Name of publisher, year listed, name of listicle, and placement
Publisher	Year	Listicle	Placement	Ref.
Forbes	2017	Korea Power Celebrity 40	27th	
Forbes	2018	Korea Power Celebrity 40	24th	
Forbes	2025	Korea Power Celebrity 40	15th	
Gallup Korea	2024	Best Television Couple of the Past Decade (Note: With Kim Go-eun for Guardian: The Lonely and Great God (2016))	2nd	
The Screen	2019	2009–2019 Top Box Office Powerhouse Actors in Korean Movies	17th	
