= Seo Hyun-jin =

South Korean actress and singer (born 1985)

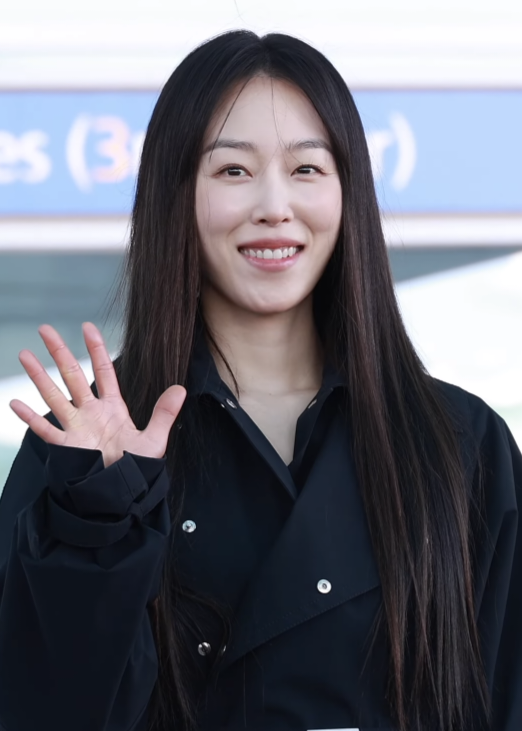
- Seo in 2025
- Born: February 27, 1985 (age 41); Seoul, South Korea
- Education: Dongduk Women's University
- Occupations: Actress; singer
- Years active: 2001–present
- Agent: Management Soop
- Height: 167 cm (5 ft 6 in)
- Musical career
- Genre: K-pop
- Instrument: Vocals
- Label: SM
- Formerly of: M.I.L.K; SM Town

Korean name
- Hangul: 서현진
- RR: Seo Hyeonjin
- MR: Sŏ Hyŏnjin
- Website: msoopent.com

Seo Hyun-jin (Korean: 서현진; born February 27, 1985) is a South Korean actress and singer. Seo debuted as the vocalist of South Korean girl group M.I.L.K. in 2001 and continued until the group disbanded in 2003. She contributed songs as a solo artist after the group broke up before she transitioned into acting in 2006.

Seo made her acting debut in the musical The Sound of Music (2006) then followed by appearances in several television series and film. She is best known for her leading role as Oh Hae-young in the romantic comedy TV series Another Miss Oh (2016), which gained her wider recognition. Seo has since gone on to have key parts in the medical melodrama Dr. Romantic (2016–2017), romance dramas Temperature of Love (2017), The Beauty Inside (2018), and You Are My Spring (2021), and the legal drama Why Her (2022).

== Life and career ==
=== 1985–2005: Early life and music career ===
Seo was born on February 27, 1985, in Dobong District (now Nowon District), Seoul, South Korea. She was scouted by S.M. Entertainment and later debuted as a vocalist of South Korean girl group, M.I.L.K in 2001, under the label's subsidiary BM Entertainment. However, the group soon fell by the wayside due to fierce competition among manufactured bands, which led to one of the members quitting before they completely disbanded in 2003. After M.I.L.K. was dissolved, Seo attended Dongduk Women's University, where she majored in applied musicology to keep her dream of a singing career alive. Seo contributed songs to a few soundtracks and SM Town compilations as a solo artist.

=== 2006–2014: Acting debut and further roles ===
Seo had the chance to perform in her first musical, The Sound of Music in 2006, which she saw as the turning point in her acting career.

Supporting roles followed in the period drama Hwang Jini (2006), TV police procedural H.I.T (2007), and the queer-themed film Ashamed (2011). Seo first drew attention for her subtler performance in The Duo (2011), as a neighborhood tomboy who later becomes a gisaeng. She played her first villain in Feast of the Gods (2012), as an extremely ambitious chef embroiled in a rivalry. Seo was then cast in leading roles for two historical dramas The King's Daughter, Soo Baek-hyang (2013) and The Three Musketeers (2014).

Seo has also frequently appeared in projects directed by her best friend, actress Ku Hye-sun, notably in the short film The Madonna and in the feature film Magic, in which she had her first leading role.

=== 2015–present: Rising popularity and continued television roles ===
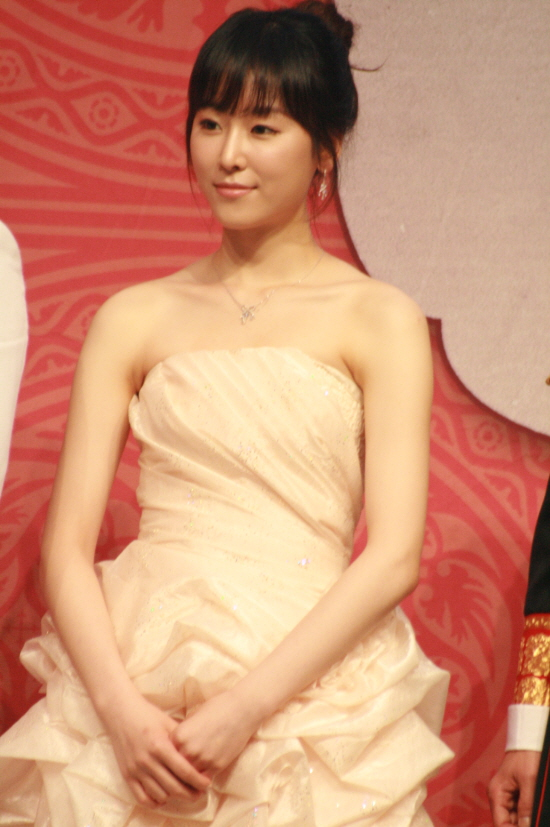
Seo in 2010

Seo said the character that most resembled her real-life personality was the foodie freelance writer in Let's Eat 2 (2015), adding that she "didn't realize how much fun shooting a lively and comedic drama could be." The drama was Seo's first foray into the romantic-comedy genre. She was reviewed well for the part, to the point that it became a turning-point in her career.

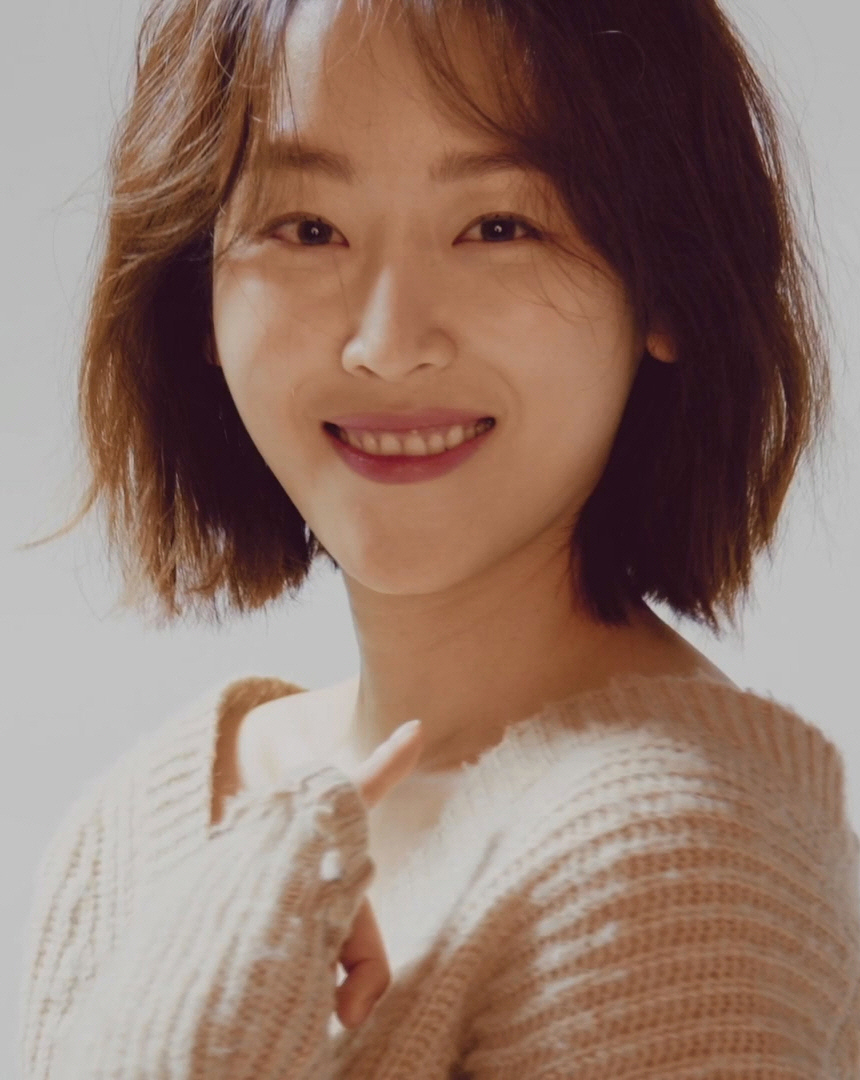
Seo for Marie Claire Korea in December 2016

Her popularity grew rapidly after the hit romance comedy drama Another Miss Oh (2016), in which she starred alongside Eric Mun. She was praised for her portrayal of a girl-next-door type, and won the Baeksang Arts Award for Best Actress. Later that same year, she starred in the SBS hit medical drama Dr. Romantic alongside Han Suk-kyu and Yoo Yeon-seok. In 2017, Seo starred in the romantic-themed television series Temperature of Love penned by Ha Myung-hee.

In 2018, Seo was cast in the fantasy melodrama The Beauty Inside which was based on the 2015 romantic comedy film of the same name. She played an actress who spends a week each month inhabiting someone else's body. She then starred in the high school television series Black Dog: Being A Teacher in 2019 and subsequently in the tvN drama series You Are My Spring in 2021.

In 2022, Seo starred in the SBS legal drama Why Her in the titular role of Oh Soo-jae, a lawyer-turned-professor and in the film Cassiopeia as a woman who is diagnosed with Alzheimer's disease and is slowly turning into a young child due to the loss of her memory.

In 2024, Seo starred in the mystery melodrama television series The Trunk opposite Gong Yoo. Written by Park Eun-young and directed by Kim Kyu-tae, it is based on the novel of the same name by Kim Ryeo-ryeong about two people under a one-year marriage contract and a mysterious trunk. Seo played Noh In-ji, a director of the company that arranges temporary marriages.

== Personal life ==
A devout Roman Catholic, Seo is an ambassador and a member of the One Heart One Body Movement, a Catholic organization from Seoul. Her baptismal name is Gabriella.

== Other activities ==
In 2019, Seo was recognised as an exemplary tax payer by the National Tax Service of South Korea and was named as an honorary ambassador together with Lee Je-hoon.

== Filmography ==
=== Film ===
Year	Title	Role	Notes	Ref.
2006	Love Me Not	Ji-hye		
2008	Story of Wine	Jin-ju		
2008	Dating on Earth (지구에서 연애중)	Soo-hyun		
2008	The Madonna (유쾌한 도우미)	Nun	Short film	
2010	Magic (요술)	Ji-eun		
2011	Ashamed	Hee-jin		
2012	The Peach Tree	Shi-yeon	Cameo	
2012	Fragments of Sweet Memories (기억의 조각들)	Mom	Short film	
2016	Familyhood	Sang-mi		
2017	Because I Love You	Hyun-kyeong		
2018	Mystery Pink (미스터리핑크)	Ju-eun	Short film	
2022	Cassiopeia	Su-jin		

=== Television series ===
Year	Title	Role	Notes	Ref.
2006	Hwang Jini	Jung Ga-eun		
2007	H.I.T	Jang Hee-jin		
2011	The Duo	Dal-yi		
2011	The Peak	Ahn Il-yang		
2012	Feast of the Gods	Ha In-joo / Song Yeon-woo		
2012	The King's Doctor	Jo So-yong (Gwi-in Jo)	Cameo	
2012–2013	Here Comes Mr. Oh	Na Jin-joo		
2013	Goddess of Fire	Shim Hwa-ryung		
2013	Drama Festival – "Unrest"	Joon-kyung's mother	Cameo	
2013–2014	The King's Daughter, Soo Baek-hyang	Seol-nan / Soo Baek-hyang		
2014	The Three Musketeers	Kang Yoon-seo		
2015	Let's Eat 2	Baek Soo-ji		
2016	Another Miss Oh	Oh Hae-young (Soil)		
2016	Bring It On, Ghost	Department store clerk	Cameo (Episode 13)	
2016–2017	Dr. Romantic	Yoon Seo-jung		
2017	Temperature of Love	Lee Hyun-soo		
2018	Let's Eat 3	Baek Soo-ji	Cameo	
2018	The Beauty Inside	Han Se-gye		
2019–2020	Black Dog: Being A Teacher	Go Ha-neul		
2020	Record of Youth	Lee Hyun-soo	Cameo	
2021	You Are My Spring	Kang Da-jung		
2022	Why Her	Oh Soo-jae		
2024	The Trunk	Noh In-ji		
2025	Love Me	Seo Jun-kyung		

=== Television shows ===
Year	Title	Role	Notes	Ref.
2014	SNS Expedition	Regular cast		
2015	Let's Eat with Friends	Regular cast		
2023	Wild Plains Serengeti 3	Narrator	Episode 1–4	

=== Music video appearances ===
Year	Song Title	Artist	Ref.
2009	"One Step at a Time"	Seo Young-eun	
2009	"Dugeun Dugeun, Tomorrow"	4Tomorrow	

== Theater ==
Year	title	Role	Ref.
2006	The Sound of Music	Liesl von Trapp	
2010	Goong: The Musical	Min Hyo-rin	
2015	Cinderella	Cinderella	

== Discography ==
=== Singles ===
Title	Year	Peak chart positions	Sales (DL)	Album
Title	Year	KOR Gaon	Sales (DL)	Album
As lead artist
"Paradise" (with Fly to the Sky, Lee Ji-hoon, Ji-yeon)	2003	—	—N/a	2003 Summer Vacation in SM Town
"Summer in Dream" (with Moon Hee-jun, Shoo, BoA, Jae-won, Park Hee-bon)	2003	—	—N/a	2003 Summer Vacation in SM Town
"Raindrops"	2006	—	—N/a	2006 Summer SM Town
"Winter of Memories"	2006	—	—N/a	2006 Winter SM Town – Snow Dream
"Have Yourself a Merry Little Christmas"	2007	—	—N/a	2007 Winter SM Town – Only Love
Soundtrack appearances
"Grip! " (Korean version)	2003	—	—N/a	Inuyasha OST
"Give Me a Little Try"	2006	—	—N/a	Princess Hours OST
"0"	2006	—	—N/a	Hyena OST
"Calling"	2007	—	—N/a	Air City OST
"Song of Jeongeup" (feat. Kim Nani)	2013	—	—N/a	The King's Daughter, Soo Baek-hyang OST
"Up & Down" (feat. Risso)	2015	—	—N/a	Let's Eat 2 OST
"What Is Love" (with Yoo Seung-woo)	2016	6	KOR: 705,741+	Another Miss Oh OST
"Falling Flower" (落花)'	2021		—N/a	You Are My Spring OST
"—" denotes releases that did not chart

== Accolades ==
=== Awards and nominations ===
Name of the award ceremony, year presented, category, nominee of the award, and the result of the nomination
Award ceremony	Year	Category	Nominee / Work	Result	Ref.
APAN Star Awards	2014	Excellence Award, Actress in a Serial Drama	The King's Daughter, Soo Baek-hyang	Nominated	
APAN Star Awards	2016	Excellence Award, Actress in a Miniseries	Another Miss Oh	Won	
APAN Star Awards	2021	Top Excellence Award, Actress in a Miniseries	Black Dog: Being A Teacher	Nominated	
APAN Star Awards	2022	Top Excellence Award, Actress in a Miniseries	Why Her	Nominated	
Baeksang Arts Awards	2017	Best Actress – Television	Another Miss Oh	Won	
Blue Dragon Series Awards	2025	Best Actress	The Trunk	Nominated	
Brand Customer Loyalty Awards	2020	Most Influential Actress (Drama)	Seo Hyun-jin	Won	
Grimae Awards	2017	Best Actress	Temperature of Love	Won	
Korea Best Star Awards	2018	Best Drama Star	The Beauty Inside	Won	
Korea Drama Awards	2011	Best New Actress	The Duo	Nominated	
Korea Drama Awards	2013	Excellence Award, Actress	Goddess of Fire, Here Comes Mr. Oh	Won	
Korea Drama Awards	2015	Excellence Award, Actress	Let's Eat 2	Nominated	
Korea Drama Awards	2016	Top Excellence Award, Actress	Another Miss Oh	Nominated	
MBC Drama Awards	2011	Best New Actress in a Miniseries	The Duo	Won	
MBC Drama Awards	2012	Excellence Award, Actress in a Serial Drama	Feast of the Gods, Here Comes Mr. Oh	Won	
MBC Drama Awards	2013	Excellence Award, Actress in a Serial Drama	The King's Daughter, Soo Baek-hyang	Nominated	
SBS Drama Awards	2016	Grand Prize (Daesang)	Dr. Romantic	Nominated	
SBS Drama Awards	2016	Excellence Award, Actress in a Genre Drama	Dr. Romantic	Won	
SBS Drama Awards	2016	Top 10 Stars	Dr. Romantic	Won	
SBS Drama Awards	2016	Best Couple	Seo Hyun-jin with Yoo Yeon-seok; Dr. Romantic	Won	
SBS Drama Awards	2016	Idol Academy Award – Best Kiss	Seo Hyun-jin with Yoo Yeon-seok; Dr. Romantic	Won	
SBS Drama Awards	2017	Grand Prize (Daesang)	Temperature of Love	Nominated	
SBS Drama Awards	2017	Top Excellence Award, Actress in a Monday–Tuesday Drama	Temperature of Love	Nominated	
SBS Drama Awards	2017	Best Couple	Seo Hyun-jin with Yang Se-jong; Temperature of Love	Nominated	
SBS Drama Awards	2022	Grand Prize (Daesang)	Why Her	Nominated	
SBS Drama Awards	2022	Top Excellence Award, Actress in a Miniseries Genre/Fantasy Drama	Why Her	Won	
SBS Drama Awards	2022	Best Supporting Team	Why Her	Nominated	
tvN10 Awards	2016	Best Actress	Another Miss Oh	Nominated	
tvN10 Awards	2016	Made in tvN, Actress in Drama	Another Miss Oh	Won	
tvN10 Awards	2016	Romantic-Comedy Queen	Another Miss Oh	Won	
tvN10 Awards	2016	Best Kiss	Seo Hyun-jin with Eric Mun; Another Miss Oh	2nd place	

=== State honors ===
Name of the organization, year presented, and the award given
Organization	Year	Award	Ref.
53rd Taxpayers' Day	2019	Presidential Commendation	

=== Listicles ===
Name of publisher, year listed, name of listicle, and placement
Publisher	Year	Listicle	Placement	Ref.
Forbes	2017	Korea Power Celebrity	26th	
