= The Trunk (TV series) =

2024 South Korean television series

- Promotional poster
- Hangul: 트렁크
- RR: Teureongkeu
- MR: T'ŭrŏngk'ŭ
- Genre: Mystery; Melodrama
- Based on: The Trunk by Kim Ryeo-ryeong
- Written by: Park Eun-young
- Directed by: Kim Kyu-tae
- Starring: Seo Hyun-jin; Gong Yoo
- Music by: Choi Seung-kwon; Kim Ji-soo
- Country of origin: South Korea
- Original language: Korean
- No. of episodes: 8

Production
- Executive producer: Kim Eun-young
- Producers: Shin Yeon-joo; Lee Dong-gyu
- Cinematography: Park Jang-hyuk
- Editor: Kim Yoo-mi
- Running time: 59–72 minutes
- Production companies: Project 318; GTist

Original release
- Network: Netflix
- Release: November 29, 2024

The Trunk (Korean: 트렁크) is a 2024 South Korean mystery melodrama television series based on the novel of the same name by Kim Ryeo-ryeong. Written by Park Eun-young, directed by Kim Kyu-tae, and starring Seo Hyun-jin and Gong Yoo. The series depicts two people under one-year marriage contract and a mysterious trunk. It was released on Netflix on November 29, 2024.

== Synopsis ==
Noh In-ji, an employee at NM (New Marriage), finds herself deeply alone despite living with a contract husband every year. Meanwhile, Han Jeong-won enters this contract marriage in an ironic attempt to save his previous marriage. Their lives are turned upside down when a mysterious trunk discovered in a lake sends them into a whirlwind of events involving the matchmaking service.

== Cast and characters ==
=== Main ===
- Seo Hyun-jin as Noh In-ji

Deputy director of NM (New Marriage), a company that arranges temporary marriages.

- Gong Yoo as Han Jeong-won

A music producer who is consumed by anxiety and loneliness due to past pain.

=== Supporting ===
- Jung Yun-ha as Lee Seo-yeon

Jeong-won's ex-wife.

- Jo I-geon as Yoon Ji-oh

An employee of NM.

- Kim Dong-won as Eom Tae-sung

A rice cake craftsman and In-ji's stalker.

- Hong Woo-jin as Oh Hyun-cheol

President of Label and Jeong-won's friend since their college days.

- Joo Min-kyung as Kang Yoon-ah

Hyun-cheol's wife who has deep emptiness and repression inside.

- Jeon Hae-jin as Jung Si-jung

In-ji's best friend.

- Choi Yoon-ji as Yoo In-young

An employee of NM.

- Yang Dae-hyuk as Oh Jin-bum

A detective of Violent Crimes Unit 1 at Gyeonggi Police Station.

- Kim Roi-ha as Ma Soo-sa

A detective of Narcotics Unit at Gyeonggi Police Station.

- Kim Ho-jung as Baek Yoo-shim

Director of Maeumjae.

- Kim Woo-jin as Engine
- Kang Hoo-jae as Robi
- Kim Eun-seok as Jeong-won's father
- Yoo Dam-yeon as Jeong-won's mother

=== Special appearances ===
- Cha Seung-won
- Uhm Ji-won as Lee Seon

CEO of NM and the person who scouted In-ji.

- Lee Jung-eun as Kwon Do-dam

A woman who has been watching In-ji for the past five years.

- Choi Young-joon as Kim Hyun-choo

A detective of Violent Crimes Unit 1 at Gyeonggi Police Station who pursues the mystery of a murder case.

- Lee Ki-woo as Seo Do-ha

Team leader at SB Electronics and was Inji's first marriage partner.

- Park Ji-ah as Pawn Shop Owner
- Jung Kyung-ho as Joon-ho

A client of NM.

== Production and release ==
According to multiple broadcasting officials in February 2023, Gong Yoo and Seo Hyun-jin, who are both under Management Soop, were cast and positively considering to star in the series which is based on the novel of the same name by Kim Ryeo-ryeong and produced by GTist. Kim Kyu-tae, who directed It's Okay, That's Love (2014), Moon Lovers: Scarlet Heart Ryeo (2016), Live (2018), and Our Blues (2022), and Park Eun-young, who wrote Hwarang: The Poet Warrior Youth (2016), collaborated for the series. Five months later, both Seo and Gong were officially confirmed their appearances and would act as a temporary marriage couple. In August 2023, Jung Yun-ha was cast and expected to have a large role in the drama.

Ten Asia reported that the filming lasted for about six months beginning at the end of August 2023 and wrapping up in February 2024.

The series was released exclusively on Netflix on November 29, 2024, with a total of eight episodes.

== Reception ==
=== Critical response ===
On the review aggregator website Rotten Tomatoes, 83% of 6 critics' reviews are positive, with an average rating of 7.8/10.

=== Accolades ===
Award ceremony	Year	Category	Nominee	Result	Ref.
Blue Dragon Series Awards	2025	Best Actress	Seo Hyun-jin	Nominated	
