= A Man and a Woman (2016 film) =

- Theatrical release poster
- Hangul: 남과 여
- RR: Namgwa yeo
- MR: Namgwa yŏ
- Directed by: Lee Yoon-ki
- Written by: Lee Yoon-ki; Sin Eun-yeong
- Produced by: Oh Jung-wan; Lee Dong-ha
- Starring: Jeon Do-yeon; Gong Yoo
- Cinematography: Kim Dong-young
- Edited by: Kim Hyung-ju
- Music by: Bang Jun-seok
- Production company: Bom Film Productions
- Distributed by: Showbox
- Release date: February 25, 2016
- Running time: 115 minutes
- Country: South Korea
- Language: Korean
- Box office: US$1.5 million

A Man and a Woman (Korean: 남과 여; RR: Namgwa yeo) is a 2016 South Korean romantic drama film directed by Lee Yoon-ki. It stars Jeon Do-yeon and Gong Yoo as two people who meet and begin a love affair in Finland. The film was released on February 25, 2016.

== Plot ==
On a cold winter day, Sang-min asks Ki-hong for a light. The two strangers have dropped their kids off at a pickup area for a children's camp in Helsinki, Finland.

The man and woman decide to trail their children to the campground. On their way back, a snowstorm forces them to spend an evening at an inn. In the morning, they walk through the woods and find a secluded sauna where they share a sexual encounter. They leave the next day without knowing each other's names and part ways.

Several months later back in South Korea, Sang-min fixes a display at her clothing shop and sees Ki-hong walking by. It is revealed that they are both married with their own children, but share a bond that defies their condition. As they go about their lives, they are shown to be facing significant family issues: Sang-min's son has an unspecified illness that strains her family, her caretakers at home who struggle to manage her son's illness, and her marriage lacks intimacy, while Ki-hong's own family manages the mental health of his young wife who is battling suicidal thoughts, depression, and alcoholic tendencies that place her at risk of being committed to asylums. Ki-hong finds himself serving more as a guardian or older brother than a husband to his wife, and spends less time with her and their daughter after each mental health episode. Eventually, both Sang-min and Ki-hong reconnect and begin seeing each other covertly, hiding their relationship from friends, family, and co-workers as an escape from the tremendous difficulties they face in their separate lives.

The pair spend several nights together, avoiding the reality that their worlds are slowly crumbling around them. Sang-min realizes that she is in love with Ki-hong and decides to divorce her husband. She then goes back to Finland, but sees Ki-hong smiling in a restaurant with his family. Heartbroken, she flees, although Ki-hong notices and attempts to follow her in his car but stops when he sees his daughter through the restaurant window. Ki-hong stops in his tracks and decides to stop his affair for the sake of his daughter. He is finally seen driving away with his family in his car with tears welling up in his eyes as Sang-min cries concurrently in her taxi.

== Cast ==
- Jeon Do-yeon as Sang-min
- Gong Yoo as Ki-hong
- Lee Mi-so as Moon-joo
- Park Byung-eun as Ahn Jae-suk
- Park Min-ji as Ha-jeong
- Yoon Se-ah as Se-na
- Min Moo-je as Se-na's boyfriend
- Kang Shin-chul as Ki-hong's friend
- Lee Ji-hoon as Ki-hong's friend
- No Kang-min as Jong-hwa
- Kang Ji-woo as Yoo-rim
- Jeon Ye-seo as Hyo-seon
- Kim Hye-ok as Moon-joo's mother

== Production ==
Filming began on November 19, 2014 and ended on March 23, 2015, with footage shot in Finland and Estonia in February 2015.
