= You Are My Spring =

2021 South Korean fantasy television series

- Promotional poster
- Hangul: 너는 나의 봄
- RR: Neoneun naui bom
- MR: Nŏnŭn naŭi pom
- Genre: Thriller; Mystery; Drama; Romance; Comedy
- Created by: Kim Je-hyeon (tvN)
- Developed by: Studio Dragon
- Written by: Lee Mi-na
- Directed by: Jung Ji-hyun
- Starring: Seo Hyun-jin; Kim Dong-wook; Yoon Park; Nam Gyu-ri
- Composer: Lim Ha-Young
- Country of origin: South Korea
- Original language: Korean
- No. of episodes: 16

Production
- Executive producer: Kim Seon-tae
- Producers: Yoon Ha-rim; Heo Seok-Won; Park Heon-Joo
- Camera setup: Single-camera
- Running time: 70 minutes
- Production company: Hwa&Dam Pictures

Original release
- Network: TVN
- Release: July 5 – August 24, 2021

You Are My Spring (Korean: 너는 나의 봄; RR: Neoneun naui bom) is a 2021 South Korean television series directed by Jung Ji-hyun and starring Seo Hyun-jin, Kim Dong-wook, Yoon Park, and Nam Gyu-ri. The series follows the three main characters who come to deal with their interconnected childhood traumas. It premiered on TVN on July 5, 2021, and aired every Monday and Tuesday at 21:00 (KST) for 16 episodes. It is available worldwide for streaming on Netflix.

== Synopsis ==
The series focuses on three characters dealing with interconnected childhood traumas. Kang Da-jung (Seo Hyun-jin), a hotel concierge manager with a history of bad relationships, moves to the rooftop of a new building for a fresh start. Joo Young-do (Kim Dong-wook) is a psychiatrist who does his best to help people live. Chae-joon (Yoon Park) pursues Da-jung after he finally finds her again. Ahn Ga-young (Nam Gyu-ri) is an actress recovering from depression who does not know how to deal with romantic relationships.

== Cast ==
=== Main ===
- Seo Hyun-jin as Kang Da-jung

34 years old, A hotel concierge manager, and a resident on the rooftop floor of the Gugu building.

  - Ok Ye-rin as young Kang Da-jung
- Kim Dong-wook as Joo Young-do
  - Choi Yoon-jae as young Joo Young-do

A psychiatrist who wants to make people live.

- Yoon Park as Chae Joon/Dr. Ian Chase
  - Choi Min-young as Young Chae Joon

The CEO of an investment company, he has a one-sided crush on Kang Da-jeong

- Nam Gyu-ri as Ahn Ga-yeong

An actress who is afraid to love due to a bad experience.

=== Supporting ===
==== People around Kang Da-jeong ====
- Oh Hyun-kyung as Mun Mi-ran

The mother of Kang Da-jeong. She runs a pizza shop.

- Kang Hoon as Kang Tae-jung

Kang Da-jung's younger brother, a handsome bartender who attracts female customers with his pleasant shape and a sentimental attitude

- Park Ye-ni as Heo Yoo-kyung

Kang Da-jeong's fellow hotelier who speaks English fluently as a result of attending an international school. She is a kind woman with an honest, playful and friendly personality

- Kim Ye-won as Park Eun-ha

Kang Da-jeong's close friend and a cafe owner.

- Han Min as Park Chul-do

Kang Da-jeong's close friend and the twin brother of Park Eun-ha.

- Park Jong-wook as Jung-bin

Hotel concierge manager and Kang Da-jeong's assistant

- Jang Seong-hoon as Secretary Chu

Handsome secretary for hotel VIP guests

==== People around Joo Yeong-do ====
- Baek Hyun-joo as Oh Mi-kyung

She works as a nurse.

- Lee Hae-Young as Go Jin-bok

The detective team leader of the 3rd strong team of the Pungji Police Station.

- Yoon Ji-on as Park Ho

The youngest detective in Team 3 at Pungji Police Station.

- Kim Seo-kyung as Cheon Seung-won

A self-proclaimed genius entertainment producer and the best friend of Joo Young-do.

- Ji Seung-hyun as Seo Ha-neul

A veterinarian who runs the animal hospital in Gugu Building, Joo Yeong-do's friend and has a warm and kind appearance.

==== People around Ahn Ga-young ====
- Park Sang-nam as Patrick / Ryu Seok-jun

A member of the third biggest boy group in Korea called Cayman who was Ahn Ga-young's fan even before he debuted

- Hwang Seung-eon as Jin-ho

A former boxer and fitness trainer who is in charge of Ahn Ga-young's training. She enjoys making people stronger.

==== Others ====
- Yoon Sang-jeong as Min Ah-ri, a professional part-time worker in a café.
- Nam Mi-jung as Shaman (Ep.2)
- Kim Nam-hee as Actor (Ep.9–10)
- Go Geon-han as Jun-ho, Eun-ha's ex-boyfriend (Ep.9)

== Production ==
=== Casting ===
On September 14, 2020, Seo Hyun-jin was confirmed to play the main lead in You Are My Spring as Kang Da-jung, a hotel concierge. On December 31, it was reported that Kim Dong-wook was reviewing the offer to play as male lead in the drama opposite Seo Hyun-jin. In the second week of January 2021, Seo Hyun-jin, Kim Dong-wook, Yoon Park and Nam Gyu-ri were confirmed as main casts of the drama.

=== Filming ===
Principal photography began in early February 2021, in Suamgol, Cheongju.

== Original soundtrack ==
You Are My Spring

Soundtrack album by Various Artists
- Released: 2021
- Genre: Soundtrack
- Languages: Korean; English
- Labels: YG Plus; Studio Maum C; Hwa&Dam Pictures

=== Part 1 ===
Released on July 6, 2021
No.	Title	Lyrics	Music	Artist	Length
1.	"In ruin"	Nino Lucarelli	Raiden, Nino Lucarelli, Nthonius, Meisobo	Raiden	3:33
2.	"In ruin" (Inst.)				3:33

=== Part 2 ===
Released on July 13, 2021
No.	Title	Lyrics	Music	Artist	Length
1.	"Because I'm You" (난 너여서)	Hamelli	Jeong Gu-hyun	Seol Ho-seung (SURL)	3:45
2.	"Because I'm You" (Inst.)				3:45

=== Part 3 ===
Released on July 19, 2021
No.	Title	Lyrics	Music	Artist	Length
1.	"Still Wonder"	Naiv	Ki-duk (9duck)	Ha Hyun-sang	2:42
2.	"Still Wonder" (Inst.)		Ki-duk (9duck)		2:42

=== Part 4 ===
Released on July 20, 2021
No.	Title	Lyrics	Music	Artist	Length
1.	"A Butterfly Flew Away" (나비가 날았습니다)	Park Chung-hak	Oh Dong-joon	Kim Min-seok (MeloMance)	4:16
2.	"A Butterfly Flew Away" (Inst.)		Oh Dong-joon		4:16

=== Part 5 ===
Released on July 27, 2021
No.	Title	Lyrics	Music	Artist	Length
1.	"Peacock (落花)" (낙화 (落花))	Ki-duk (9duck)	Ki-duk (9duck)	Yang Da-il	3:35
2.	"Peacock (落花)" (Inst.)		Ki-duk (9duck)		3:35

=== Part 6 ===
Released on August 2, 2021
No.	Title	Lyrics	Music	Artist	Length
1.	"Me So Bad"	OV, Ayul, Jeina Choi	OV, Ayul, Jeina Choi	Yoari	3:33
2.	"Me So Bad" (Inst.)		OV, Ayul, Jeina Choi		3:33

=== Part 7 ===
Released on August 3, 2021
No.	Title	Lyrics	Music	Artist	Length
1.	"Dear My Spring" (다정한 봄에게)	Lee Mina	Yoon Young-jun	Onew	4:41
2.	"Dear My Spring" (Inst.)				4:41
3.	"Dear My Spring" (Piano Ver.)				4:41

=== Part 8 ===
Released on August 10, 2021
No.	Title	Lyrics	Music	Artist	Length
1.	"Cliche"	Oh Dong-jun	Oh Dong-jun	Kwon Soon-kwan	4:38
2.	"Cliche" (Inst.)				4:38

=== Part 9 ===
Released on August 16, 2021
No.	Title	Lyrics	Music	Artist	Length
1.	"Nakhwa (Dajeongi Ver.)" (낙화 (다정이 Ver.))	Ki-duk (9duck)	Ki-duk (9duck)	Seo Hyun-jin	3:48
2.	"Nakhwa" (Inst.)				3:48

== Release ==
On May 31, 2021, the release date of You Are My Spring with a teaser was announced. The series premiered the same year on July 5 on TVN at 21:00 KST. It is available for streaming on Netflix.

== Viewership ==
You Are My Spring : South Korea viewers per episode (thousands)

Season	Episode number																Average
Season	1	2	3	4	5	6	7	8	9	10	11	12	13	14	15	16	Average
1	707	721	615	642	463	554	497	500	453	490	445	419	415	393	390	520	514

Source: Audience measurement performed nationwide by Nielsen Korea

Average TV viewership ratings
Ep.	Original broadcast date	Average audience share (Nielsen Korea)	
Ep.	Original broadcast date	Nationwide	Seoul
1	July 5, 2021	3.390% (1st)	3.560% (2nd)
2	July 6, 2021	2.958% (1st)	2.961% (2nd)
3	July 12, 2021	2.665% (1st)	2.702% (2nd)
4	July 13, 2021	3.065% (1st)	3.620% (1st)
5	July 19, 2021	2.120% (1st)	2.064% (2nd)
6	July 20, 2021	2.373% (2nd)	2.638% (2nd)
7	July 26, 2021	2.068% (1st)	2.340% (2nd)
8	July 27, 2021	1.989% (3rd)	2.141% 2nd)
9	August 2, 2021	1.941% (1st)	2.162% (1st)
10	August 3, 2021	2.372% (2nd)	2.540% (1st)
11	August 9, 2021	1.940% (1st)	2.084% (1st)
12	August 10, 2021	2.014% (2nd)	2.350% (2nd)
13	August 16, 2021	1.860% (5th)	1.782% (7th)
14	August 17, 2021	1.916% (3rd)	1.863% (6th)
15	August 23, 2021	1.767% (8th)	1.917% (5th)
16	August 24, 2021	2.387% (5th)	2.438% (3rd)
Average		2.301%	2.447%
In the table above, the blue numbers represent the lowest ratings and the red numbers represent the highest ratings.; This drama airs on a cable channel/pay TV which normally has a relatively smaller audience compared to free-to-air TV/public broadcasters (KBS, SBS, MBC and EBS).
