= Let's Eat 2 =

- Promotional poster
- Genre: Romance; Comedy
- Written by: Im Soo-mi
- Directed by: Park Joon-hwa
- Starring: Yoon Doo-joon; Seo Hyun-jin; Kwon Yul
- Opening theme: Delicious by Kangnam of M.I.B
- Country of origin: South Korea
- Original language: Korean
- No. of seasons: 1
- No. of episodes: 18

Production
- Production location: Sejong City
- Running time: 60 minutes
- Production company: CJ E&M

Original release
- Network: tvN
- Release: April 6 – June 2, 2015

Let's Eat 2 (Korean: 식샤를 합시다 2; RR: Siksyareul hapsida 2) is a South Korean television series starring Yoon Doo-joon, Seo Hyun-jin and Kwon Yul. It aired on tvN from April 6 to June 2, 2015, for 18 episodes. This is the second season of 2013 Let's Eat series, with Yoon Doo-joon reprising his role as Goo Dae-young, who moves to Sejong City and befriends new neighbors and friends played by Seo Hyun-jin and Kwon Yul.

== Synopsis ==
The series is about Goo Dae-young (Yoon Doo-joon), an insurance salesman, moving to the small town Sejong from the big city Seoul. He meets Baek Soo-ji (Seo Hyun-jin), who is his next door neighbour. They befriend each other quickly and make a contract while Soo-ji chases the love of her life, Lee Sang-woo (Kwon Yul).

== Cast ==
=== Main ===
- Yoon Doo-joon as Goo Dae-young
- Seo Hyun-jin as Baek Soo-ji
- Kwon Yul as Lee Sang-woo

=== Supporting ===
- Kim Hee-won as Lim Taek-soo, Dae-young's insurance colleague
- Hwang Seok-jeong as Kim Mi-ran, Dae-young and Soo-ji's landlady
- Jo Eun-ji as Hong In-ah, Soo-ji and Sang-woo's colleague
- Hwang Seung-eon as Hwang Hye-rim, a part-timer and beauty blogger
- Kim Ji-young as Lee Jum-yi, Dae-young and Soo-ji's first floor neighbor
- Lee Joo-seung as Lee Joo-seung / Ahn Chan-soo, Dae-young and Soo-ji's roof top neighbor
- Kim Dan-yool as Park Joo-wan, Mi-ran's son

=== Special appearances ===
- Bong Man-dae - himself (ep. 1)
- Jang Won-young - Choi Kyu-sik (ep. 1)
- Lee Do-yeon - Oh Do-yeon (ep. 1)
- Kevin Woo - Hye-rim's friend (ep. 5)
- Heo Ga-yoon - Hong Min-ah, In-ah's sister (ep. 7–9)
- Jo Jae-yoon - Mi-ran's husband (ep. 9)
- Gong Hyung-jin - In-ah's husband (ep. 11)
- Kim Hyun-suk - woman who bought treadmill from Soo-ji (ep. 11)
- Jung Ji-soon - laundry owner (ep. 14)
- Raymon Kim - restaurant owner (ep. 15)
- Tae In-ho - Lee Joo-seung (ep. 16)
- Yang Yo-seob - Dae-young's colleague (ep. 16)
- Lee Seung-joon - restaurant owner (ep. 17)
- Park Joon-hwa - potential tenant (ep. 18)
- Yoon So-yi - mysterious woman (ep. 18)

== Ratings ==
In this table, the blue numbers represent the lowest ratings and the red numbers represent the highest ratings.

Ep.	Original broadcast date	Average audience share
Ep.	Original broadcast date	AGB Nielsen
Ep.	Original broadcast date	Nationwide
1	April 6, 2015	1.090%
2	April 7, 2015	2.068%
3	April 13, 2015	1.247%
4	April 14, 2015	1.817%
5	April 20, 2015	1.760%
6	April 21, 2015	1.695%
7	April 27, 2015	1.604%
8	April 28, 2015	2.195%
9	May 4, 2015	1.413%
10	May 5, 2015	2.989%
11	May 11, 2015	2.233%
12	May 12, 2015	2.441%
13	May 18, 2015	1.885%
14	May 19, 2015	2.041%
15	May 25, 2015	2.137%
16	May 26, 2015	2.707%
17	June 1, 2015	1.735%
18	June 2, 2015	2.659%
Special	June 8, 2015	1.273%
Average		1.946%

- This drama airs on a cable channel/pay TV which normally has a relatively smaller audience compared to free-to-air TV/public broadcasters (KBS, SBS, MBC and EBS).

== Awards and nominations ==
Year	Award	Category	Nominee	Result
2016	tvN10 Awards	Romantic-Comedy King	Yoon Doo-joon	Nominated
2016	tvN10 Awards	Best Kiss Award	Yoon Doo-joon and Seo Hyun-jin	Nominated
