= Dogani, Jajce =

Dogani
- Village
- Location within Bosnia and Herzegovina
- Coordinates: 44.2803292°N 17.3904722°E
- Country: Bosnia and Herzegovina
- Entity: Federation of Bosnia and Herzegovina
- Canton: Central Bosnia
- Municipality: Jajce

Area
  - Total: 1.82 sq mi (4.72 km^{2})

Population (2013)
  - Total: 4
  - Density: 2.2/sq mi (0.85/km^{2})
- Time zone: UTC+1 (CET)
  - Summer (DST): UTC+2 (CEST)

Dogani is a village in the municipality of Jajce, Bosnia and Herzegovina.

== Demographics ==
According to the 2013 census, its population was 4, all Bosniaks.
