= Gwangju Inhwa School =

1961–2011 school in Gwangju, South Korea

- Korean: 광주인화학교
- Gwangju; South Korea

Information
- Established: 17 April 1961
- Closed: 2011
- Principal: Ryul Hyo-sook

Gwangju Inhwa School (Korean: 광주인화학교) was a school for deaf students founded in 1961 and located in Gwangju, South Korea. The school made national headlines after its decades-long record of sexually abusing students was uncovered in 2005. Following a series of investigations and amid public outcry, the school was closed in November 2011. The school was also responsible for the deaths of two children.

== History ==
The school was initially founded as the Jeonnam Deaf-Mute Welfare Center before becoming a junior high school. The senior high school section was opened in 1993.

== Sex abuse case ==
Gwangju Inhwa School sex abuse case
- Location: Gwangju Inhwa School, Gwangju, South Korea
- Date: 2000-2005 confirmed; possibly since as early as 1964
- Attack type: Child rape, rape, disability sexual abuse, school sexual abuse, child beating, alleged child murder
- Victim: Disabled students at Gwangju Inhwa School
- Perpetrators: Administration and staff at Gwangju Inhwa School
- Verdict: Guilty
- Convictions: Child rape, rape
- Sentence: Ranged from suspended sentences to 12 years in prison
- Litigation: Settlements reached for undisclosed amounts

According to a 2005 investigation, six teachers, including the principal, sexually molested or raped at least nine of their deaf students between 2000 and 2003. A newly appointed teacher alerted human rights groups in 2005, for which he was subsequently fired from his job. Nine victims came forward, but more victims were believed to have concealed additional crimes in fear of repercussions or because of trauma. The police began an investigation four months later, only after former students talked to a national TV station. As the Gwangju city government and school board tossed the case back and forth, students and parents staged a sit-in for eight months outside their offices, calling for justice.

Of the six perpetrators, four received prison terms, while the other two were freed immediately because the statute of limitations for their crimes had expired. The local court sentenced the principal (son of the school founder) to a five-year term in prison, and four others received relatively heavy penalties. But the appellate court reduced the initial court ruling, giving probation and a ₩3 million fine for the principal and lighter verdicts to the rest. Among those jailed, two were released after less than a year in jail after their terms were suspended. Four of the six teachers were reinstated in the school. The case did not draw much media attention when it went on trial in 2005, but at the time, human rights activists and victims criticised the lax legal action taken against the abusers.

The real-life events inspired bestselling novelist Gong Ji-young to write a book entitled The Crucible (Korean: 도가니; RR: Dogani), which was published in 2009 and was later adapted into the 2011 film of the same name (the film adaptation was also released internationally under the title Silenced). The Crucible depicted the sexual and physical violence against minors and the court proceedings marred by corruption, bribery, and Jeon-gwan ye-u. The film adaptation became a box office hit, drawing 4.7 million viewers, almost one-tenth of South Korea's population, and among its viewers was then-President Lee Myung-bak.

The film adaptation drew renewed interest to the case. Reacting to criticisms of leniency, Gwangju High Court judge Jang Jung-hee said, "The court could not sentence them to harsh punishments because the victims dropped the charges against the perpetrators." A law that had barred the prosecution of a child sex offender unless the victim made the complaint himself or herself, was only revised in 2010. Massive public outcry prompted the police to reopen and reinvestigate the case in 2011. One of the witnesses, 71-year-old ex-teacher Kim Yeong-il, claimed that he was beaten and forced to resign in 1968 by the school's principal and his brother, the vice principal, after Kim discovered that two children were beaten and starved to death then secretly buried in 1964. Other alumni claimed that the son of the school's chairman of the board of directors forced two female students to undress and drew nude paintings of them in 1975, adding that the offender was currently teaching art at another school in the city. Two months after the film's release, the city of Gwangju officially closed the school in November 2011.

Amid the nation's collective fury and mounting pressure on politicians, the South Korean parliament unanimously passed the "Dogani Bill" in October 2011, which eliminates the statute of limitations for sex crimes against children under 13 and women with disabilities; the bill also increases the maximum penalty to life in prison. However, many members of human rights organisations who have worked for a long time to promote the welfare of people with disabilities said the public backlash should lead to more profound, long-term solutions to tackle prevalent human rights violations against disabled people.

In the subsequent criminal cases following the release of the book and movie, several of the teachers pleaded guilty to sexual molestation charges. Among the guilty included the 63-year-old former administrator, who in July 2012 was sentenced by the Gwangju District Court to 12 years in prison for sexually assaulting an 18-year-old student in April 2005.
