= Silenced (2011 film) =

2011 South Korean film

- Film poster
- Hangul: 도가니
- RR: Dogani
- MR: Togani
- Directed by: Hwang Dong-hyuk
- Written by: Hwang Dong-hyuk
- Based on: The Crucible by Gong Ji-young
- Produced by: Uhm Yong-hun; Bae Jeong-min; Na Byung-joon
- Starring: Gong Yoo; Jung Yu-mi
- Cinematography: Kim Ji-yong
- Edited by: Hahm Sung-won
- Music by: Mowg; Justin Bieber
- Production companies: Samgeori Pictures; Fantagio; Paramount Pictures; Foxtel
- Distributed by: CJ Entertainment
- Release dates: 22 September 2011 (South Korea and United States)
- Running time: 125 minutes
- Countries: South Korean; United States; Australia
- Languages: Korean; Korean Sign Language; English
- Box office: US$30.7 million

Silenced (Korean: 도가니, romanized: Dogani, lit. 'The Crucible') is a 2011 crime drama film based on the novel The Crucible by Gong Ji-young, directed by Hwang Dong-hyuk and starring Gong Yoo and Jung Yu-mi. It is based on events that took place at Gwangju Inhwa School for the Deaf, where young Deaf students were the victims of repeated sexual assaults by faculty members over five years in the early 2000s.

Depicting both the crimes and the court proceedings that let the teachers off with minimal punishment, the film sparked public outrage upon its September 2011 release, which eventually resulted in a reopening of the investigations into the incidents. With over 4 million people in Korea having watched the film, the demand for legislative reform eventually reached its way to the National Assembly of South Korea, where a revised bill, dubbed the Dogani Bill, was passed in late October 2011 to abolish the statute of limitations for sex crimes and harassment against minors and disabled people.

== Plot ==
Kang In-ho is driving to the fictional city of Mujin, North Jeolla Province to accept a position as the art teacher at Ja-ae Academy, a special needs school for Deaf children. Upon arriving at the academy, In-ho meets with headmaster Lee Gang-seok and his identical twin brother, admin head Lee Gang-bok. He is excited to teach his new students, yet the children are aloof and distant, and avoid running into him as much as possible. In-ho persists in trying to show the kids that he cares. When the students finally open up, In-ho discovers the shocking and ugly truth about the school: the students have been secretly enduring physical and sexual abuse by the teachers and administration.

In-ho decides to expose the crimes being committed at the school and collaborates with human rights activist Seo Yoo-jin. However, In-ho and Yoo-jin soon realize the school's headmaster, teachers, staff, and even the police, prosecutors and community combine to cover up the truth. In-ho is fired from his position, but he stays in Mujin to pursue justice for the children. The defense attorney uses "privileges of the former post" and the accused unhesitatingly lie and bribe their way into getting very light sentences. Using their last night of freedom to go out partying, the Lee brothers and Park Bo-hyun (one of the sexually abusive teachers), are laughing with their attorney that the judge was so easy to pay off for a light sentence.

As Park leaves the party and walks home, he bumps into Min-su (one of the victims) along the way. Attempting to force the boy to come to his home to be raped once more, Park is shocked when Min-su stabs him in the side with a knife, having fallen into despair from his lost chance to put Park away for good. Park brushes off the stabbing and smacks Min-su to the ground, viciously beating and kicking the boy, proclaiming he will kill him. As he tries to finish Min-su off, Park is overpowered by the boy, who flings both of them onto a nearby railroad track. As an oncoming train barrels toward them, Park screaming in pain, suffering, and despair, losing blood, weakened by the stab wound, is held down by Min-su refusing to let him escape, before they are both killed.

Later, at a protest, In-ho and students Yeon-doo and Yoo-ri are seen mourning Min-su's death. A group of protesters and activists fill the street, when police attempt to disperse them. However, since most are deaf-mute, they continue unaware, forcing police to use water cannons to disperse them. As the clash plays out, In-ho stands amid the chaos carrying a picture of Min-su, repeatedly chanting, "Everyone! This boy could neither hear nor speak. This child is called Min-su," before he is apprehended by the police. The movie ends with In-ho back in Seoul where he receives an email from Yoo-jin with an update: the appeal to the case was lost but the children's condition has improved.

== Cast ==
- Gong Yoo – Kang In-ho
- Jung Yu-mi – Seo Yoo-jin
- Kim Hyun-soo – Kim Yeon-doo
- Jung In-seo – Jin Yoo-ri
- Baek Seung-hwan – Jeon Min-su
- Kim Ji-young – In-ho's mother
- Jang Gwang – headmaster Lee Gang-seok and his twin brother, admin head Lee Gang-bok
- Im Hyeon-seong – Young-hoon
- Kim Joo-ryoung – Yoon Ja-ae
- Kim Min-sang – Park Bo-hyun
- Um Hyo-sup – police officer Jang
- Jeon Kuk-hwan – Attorney Hwang
- Choi Jin-ho – prosecutor
- Kwon Yoo-jin – judge
- Park Hye-jin – headmaster's wife
- Kim Ji-young – Kim Sol-yi (In-ho's daughter)
- Eom Ji-seong – Young-soo
- Lee Sang-hee – auto repair shop owner
- Nam Myung-ryul – Professor Kim Jung-woo
- Jang So-yeon – courtroom sign language interpreter
- Hong Suk-youn – school custodian/guard

== Impact ==
The film sparked public outcry over lenient court rulings, prompting police to reopen the case and lawmakers to introduce bills for the human rights of the vulnerable. Four out of the six teachers at the Gwangju Inhwa School for whom serious punishment was recommended by the education authority were reinstated after they escaped punishment under the statute of limitations. Only two of them were convicted of repeated rapes of eight young students and received jail terms of less than a year. 71-year-old ex teacher Kim Yeong-il recently claimed that two children had died when the incident took place in 1964, after which he was beaten and forced to resign his job by the vice principal. Two months after the film's release and resulting controversy, Gwangju City officially shut down the school in November 2011. In July 2012, the Gwangju District Court sentenced the 63-year-old former administrator of Gwangju Inhwa School to 12 years in prison for sexually assaulting an 18-year-old student in April 2005. He was also charged with physically abusing another 17-year-old student who had witnessed the crime (the victims reportedly attempted to kill themselves afterward). The administrator, only identified by his surname Kim, was also ordered to wear an electronic anklet for 10 years following his release.

In 2011, the Korean National Assembly passed the "Dogani Law" (named after the Korean name of the film), removing any statute of limitations for sexual assault against children under 13 and disabled people. It also raised the maximum sentence for rape of young children and disabled people to up to life in prison, and abolished a clause requiring that victims prove they were "unable to resist" due to their disability.

== Reception ==
For the past few years, we have seen almost no South Korean films that actively examined the state of our society, the values of what is right, and what we need to do the way The Crucible does.

— Film critic Ahn Si-hwan

In Korea, the film ranked No. 1 for three consecutive weeks and grossed ₩7.8 billion in its first week of release and grossed a total of ₩35 billion after ten weeks of screening. On Rotten Tomatoes the film has a 100% rating based on 5 reviews.

After the film's release, the bestselling book of the same name by author Gong Ji-young, which first recounted the crimes and provided the bulk of the film's content, topped national bestseller lists for the first time in two years. Ruling conservative political party Grand National Party (GNP) then called for an investigation into Gong Ji-young for engaging in "political activities", a move that was met with public derision. The English translation of the novel was published with the title Togani in 2023.

It received the Audience Award at the 2012 Udine Far East Film Festival in Italy.

Conversations about the film and its impact re-emerged when the Samsung Economic Research Institute (SERI) released its annual survey of the year's top ten consumer favorites on December 7, 2011. Based on a poll of market analysts and nearly 8,000 consumers, SERI's "Korea's Top Ten Hits of 2011" ranked Silenced among the year's top events.

The film has been studied in several scholarly publications on Korean film and also on global representation of disability rights.

== Awards and nominations ==
Year	Award	Category	Recipient	Result
2011	32nd Blue Dragon Film Awards	Best Film	Silenced	Nominated
2011	32nd Blue Dragon Film Awards	Best Director	Hwang Dong-hyuk	Nominated
2011	32nd Blue Dragon Film Awards	Best Actor	Gong Yoo	Nominated
2011	32nd Blue Dragon Film Awards	Best Actress	Jung Yu-mi	Nominated
2011	32nd Blue Dragon Film Awards	Best Supporting Actor	Jang Gwang	Nominated
2011	32nd Blue Dragon Film Awards	Best Screenplay	Hwang Dong-hyuk	Nominated
2011	32nd Blue Dragon Film Awards	Best Music	Mowg	Won
2011	32nd Blue Dragon Film Awards	Popular Star Award	Gong Yoo	Won
2012	48th Baeksang Arts Awards	Best Actor	Gong Yoo	Nominated
2012	49th Grand Bell Awards	Best Film	Silenced	Nominated
2012	49th Grand Bell Awards	Best Supporting Actress	Kim Hyun-soo	Nominated
2012	KOFRA Film Awards	Best Film	Silenced	Won
2012	Udine Far East Film Festival	Audience Award	Hwang Dong-hyuk	Won
2012	Udine Far East Film Festival	Black Dragon Audience Award	Hwang Dong-hyuk	Won

== International release ==
The film's international title is Silenced. On November 4, 2011, the film was released in select theaters in Los Angeles, San Jose, Huntington Beach, New Jersey, Philadelphia, Atlanta, Dallas, Chicago, Seattle, Portland, Las Vegas, Toronto and Vancouver. It has been reviewed by The Wall Street Journal, The Economist and The New York Times. In 2019, the film was released on Netflix.

== See also ==
- Cinema of Korea
- List of South Korean films
- List of films featuring the deaf and hard of hearing
