= Gong Jiyeong =

South Korean writer

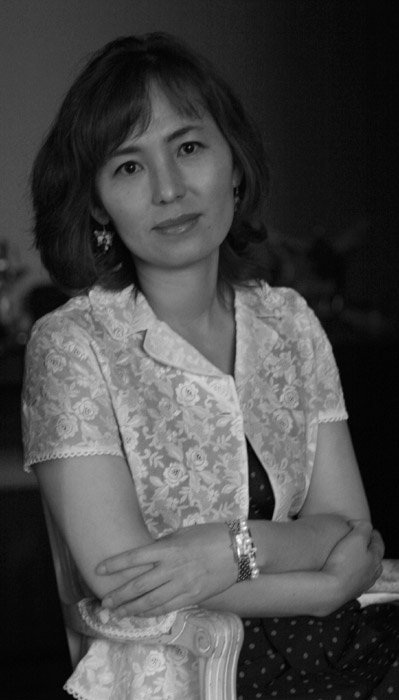
- Born: January 31, 1963 (age 63); Mapo District, Seoul, South Korea
- Citizenship: South Korean
- Education: Yonsei University
- Occupations: Novelist, influencer
- Writing career
- Pen name: 111
- Language: Korean
- Period: 1988 -
- Genre: fiction
- Notable works: The Crucible; My Sister Bongsoon
- Notable awards: Twenty-first Century Literature Award (2001); Oh Young-su Literature Award (2004); Yi Sang Literary Award (2011)

- Korean name
- Hangul: 공지영
- Hanja: 孔枝泳
- RR: Gong Jiyeong
- MR: Kong Chiyŏng

Gong Jiyeong (Korean: 공지영; born January 31, 1963) is a South Korean novelist.

== Life ==
Gong Jiyeong was interested in literature from an early age, and while still a teenager, self-published her own stories and poems.

It was during her college years in the 1980s that she came into contact with the student movement and it was from this experience that Gong drew her sense of purpose. In 1985 she received her B.A. in Literature from Yonsei University. Her first novel Rising Dawn was a direct result of her involvement in the student and labor movements of that era. Her earlier works chronicle the 1980s and the students who like the author herself came of age during that decade of violent protest and political upheaval in South Korea.

== Career ==
Gong Jiyeong began to write full-time in 1988. Her works have focused on issues surrounding laborers, the underprivileged and those who suffer discrimination. She has also written extensively about the lives of young educated women attempting to forge lives for themselves both within and without the family.

Gong has been considered a feminist writer by many, particularly since, in many of her works, the subject of women's struggle and that of labor movement conflate in characters that must face the twin task of building a new identity for themselves after the labor movement and finding a place for themselves in a male-dominated society. As the chaos and the repression of 1980s gave way to the relative calm and prosperity of the 1990s, the students who had sacrificed much to bring about the necessary social changes find themselves in a world that no longer seems to require their revolutionary fervor and sacrifice. They have no choice but to lead ordinary lives without the sense of direction that was once an integral part of their identity. For women, the process of integrating back into the capitalistic society as ordinary citizens entails not only embracing materialistic goals they once disdained but also subjugating themselves to patriarchal order. Resultant anger and confusion constitute the core of Gong's works.

While social activism is one of Gong's main thematic concerns, another equally important interest is the issue of women, particularly the failure of society to shed its patriarchal way of thinking. Gong continues to advocate gender equality, often pointing out that this equality, which is guaranteed by law, is not yet a reality. Her 1993 novel Go Alone Like the Horn of a Rhinoceros, which deals directly with women's issues, was made into a movie (in 1995 Go Alone Like a Rhino Horn was the first of Gong's novels to be made into a feature film), as well as play.

In the late 1990s, Gong continued to devote her attention to the issue of women and laborers, as well as expanding her creative energy to include the underprivileged and discriminated members of Korean society. In her 1998 novel, My Sister Bongsoon, Gong portrayed the life of a woman in the 1960s. In her bestselling novel Our Happy Time, she addressed the issue of capital punishment, and in her autobiographical novel Home of Happiness, she depicted the reality of a divorcee's household. In her most recent work, The Crucible, she exposed sexual repression in Korean society, as well as the increasing abuse and violence towards those with disabilities.

Our Happy Time was adapted into the film Maundy Thursday. It drew significant attention when the movie opened in September 2006, becoming the first Korean novel in four years to top the bestselling charts, and staying on top for eight weeks in a row.

Gong, along with South Korean writers Lee Ki-ho and Ham Min-bok, was an early adopter of the internet. She first published The Crucible on South Korean internet portal Daum on November 7, 2008, and left the work up for six months. This kind of serial writing is common in South Korea, but it is traditionally done in newspapers.

Her 2009 novel The Crucible had a substantial impact on Korean society and law with respect to the rights of people with disabilities. When its film adaptation became a major hit in 2011, members of South Korea's Grand National Party pressed for an investigation of Gong based on her engagement in "political activities." Kim Yeon-ho, a GNP politician and member of the Human Rights Commission, proposed to investigate Gong because her verbose depiction "over-intimidated" citizens. Gong later mocked Kim Yeon-ho's remark by expressing a humorous gratitude, posting "Thank you, Grand National Party, for making me internationally famous" on her Twitter account. Gong is an influential tweeter with about 300,000 followers, and has used the social networking platform to discuss social issues and controversial opinions.

== Personal life ==
Gong Jiyeong has been divorced three times, and has three children.

== Works in translation ==
- Almaden (Korean: 알마덴; MR: Almaden) translated by Bruce Fulton and Ju-Chan Fulton. In Wayfarer, Women in Translation, 1997. ISBN 9781879679092
- Human decency (Korean: 인간에 대한 예의; MR: In'gan e taehan yeŭi) translated by Bruce Fulton and Ju-chan Fulton. Asia, 2012. ISBN 9788994006352
- My sister Bongsoon (Korean: 봉순이 언니; MR: Pongsuni ŏnni) translated by Park Jung-eun. Mosaic Press, 2005. ISBN 9780889628311
- Our happy time (Korean: 우리들의 행복한 시간; MR: Uridŭl ŭi haengbok han sigan) translated by Sora Kim-Russell. Marble Arch Press, 2014. ISBN 9781476730455
- Togani (The Crucicle) (Korean: 도가니) translated by Bruce and Ju-Chan Fulton. University of Hawaii Press, 2023. ISBN 9780824894870

== Works ==
- 1993 - Go Alone Like a Rhino Horn (무소의 뿔처럼 혼자서 가라)
- 1994 - Mackerel (고등어)
- 1996 - The Unhurt Soul (상처없는 영혼)
- 1998 - My Sister Bong-soon (봉순이 언니)
- 1999 - Crying Existence (존재는 눈물을 흘린다)
- 2005 - Films of My Life
- 2005 - Our Happy Time (우리들의 행복한 시간); translated into English by Sora Kim-Russell
- 2006 - I Was Alone Like a Raindrop (빗방울처럼 나는 혼자였다)
- 2006 - Human Decency (인간에 대한 예의); translated into English by Bruce Fulton
- 2009 - People in the Bible for Children
- 2009 - The Crucible

== Adaptations ==
The 2011 film The Crucible, released internationally under the title Silenced, is based on Gong's 2009 non-fiction novel The Crucible. The novel is about the sex abuse cases at Gwangju Inhwa School.

== Awards ==
- 2001 - 7th 21st Century Literary Award
- 2001 - 27th Korean Novel and Literature Award from Korea Novelist Association
- 2004 - 12th Oh Young-soo Literature Award
- 2006 - 9th Special Media Award from Amnesty International
- 2007 - Korea Catholic Literature Award
- 2011 - Yi Sang Literary Award for Wander the Alleyways Barefoot

== See also ==
- Korean Literature
- List of Korean novelists
