= The Crucible (novel) =

2009 novel by Gong Ji-Young

- Author: Gong Ji-Young
- Language: Korean
- Publication date: 2009
- Publication place: South Korea

The Crucible (Korean: 도가니) is a 2009 novel by Gong Ji-Young (공지영) based on an actual case of mass sexual abuse at the Gwangju Inhwa School school for the deaf in South Korea. The title was taken from Arthur Miller's play of the same name.

== Plot ==
Kang In-ho is a teacher from Seoul that teaches deaf children how to do art. He settles in Mujin (a fictional city) where he finds employment as a teacher at a school for the hearing impaired.

On the first day of his new job, a young boy is struck and killed by a train, the latest of a series of accidents, he soon discovers. He hears of a young girl who had recently committed suicide by jumping off a cliff.

Kang soon suspects things are not as they seem and discovers that the students, (both boys and girls) are being abused by the principal (a powerful and highly respected member of the community), an administrative head and a dormitory superintendent.

Kang's efforts to bring the crimes to the attention of the public are met with resistance by corrupt police, doctors and other business leaders. When the case comes to trial, the defense lawyers further attempt to discredit Kang by bringing to light his past misdeeds, including the affair with his former student who committed suicide. Compounding all, the financially strapped parents of the abused students agree to remain silent about the incidents in exchange for money.

In the end, the three accused are sentenced to probation and set free to return to the school.

Kang, humiliated at having his personal failures publicized and frustrated by the lack of justice, decides to leave Mujin and return to his family in Seoul.

== Film adaptation ==
A film adaptation also titled The Crucible (Korean: 도가니; RR: Do-ga-ni), was released in 2011 starring Gong Yoo as Kang In-ho and Jung Yu-mi as Seo Yoo-jin.

== See also ==
- South Korean literature
