= Alex Landi =

American actor (born 1992)

- Born: September 28, 1992 (age 33); New York City, U.S.
- Occupations: Actor; model
- Years active: 2016–present

Alex Landi (born September 28, 1992) is an American actor and model of Korean-Italian descent, best known for his role as Dr. Nico Kim on ABC's Grey's Anatomy and Station 19.

== Early life and education ==
Landi was born in New York City. His mother, Nana Landi, is Korean and immigrated to the United States at age 15 with her family, settling in the Northern Valley, New Jersey. Landi described his ethnic background as "Half Korean, half Italian". He attended Northern Valley Regional High School at Demarest in New Jersey.

== Career ==
On September 6, 2018, it was announced that Landi was cast on Grey's Anatomy, Season 15, as Dr. Nico Kim, the series' first gay male surgeon, and first male surgeon of Asian descent. The multiple historic firsts of his casting landed him his first feature spread in Women's Wear Daily (WWD.com) in September 2018, followed by a feature cover in the February 2019 issue of Attitude magazine, and an article in the February/March 2019 issue of Da Man, an Indonesian men's fashion and lifestyle magazine. He reprised the role in the spin-off series Station 19.

In 2019, Landi had a recurring role in the second season of Netflix's Insatiable. In 2021, he began portraying Bret Nam on The CW's Walker. That year, a star was named after Landi in the International Star Registry.

He appeared in the music video for Doja Cat's 2021 single "Kiss Me More" featuring SZA.

He recently played a role in the K-drama Mr. Plankton as John Na.

== Filmography ==
Year	Title	Role	Notes
2016	264 Days	Soldier	Short
2017	Bull	Juror 1	Episode: "School for Scandal"
2017	Prillen Short Shorts	Max	Episode: "Dudes"
2018	Lycanphobic	Indio	Short
2018	Childlike	Unknown	Episode: "Sonder"
2018	Broken Land	Edmund Hu	Film
2018–2022, 2024	Grey's Anatomy	Dr. Nico Kim	Recurring role (Seasons 15–18) Guest role (Season 20)
2019	Insatiable	Henry Lee	Recurring role (Season 2)
2020	Connecting	Cameron	Recurring role
2020	Station 19	Nico Kim	Recurring role
2020	American Housewife	Flashback Greg	Cameo
2021–2022	Walker	Bret Nam	Recurring role
2021	"Kiss Me More"	Lead role	Music Video
2024	Mr. Plankton	John Na	Recurring role
