= Jung Hee-tae =

South Korean television and film actor

- Born: 5 July 1974 (age 52); Ulsan, Yeongnam, South Korea
- Education: Chung-Ang University - Bachelor of Journalism and Broadcasting
- Occupations: Film actor; theater actor
- Years active: 2002–present
- Agent: Big Boss Entertainment

Korean name
- Hangul: 정희태
- RR: Jeong Huitae
- MR: Chŏng Hŭit'ae

Jung Hee-tae (Korean: 정희태; born 5 July 1974) is a South Korean actor. He is known for his roles in My Mind's Flower Rain (2016), My Father Is Strange (2017) and 2018 drama series Radio Romance. He has appeared in about 75 TV series, theatrical plays and films including 2021 film Sweet & Sour. In 2021, he also appeared in TV series Navillera and is appearing in Artificial City.

== Career ==
Jung debuted as an actor in 2002 with the film The Coast Guard.

In August 2019, Jung was appointed as public relations ambassador for Nam-gu by the mayor. His short film Outing with Lee Seung-yeon won the Jury Grand Prize at the Spanish Short Film Festival.

In November 2021, Jung Hee-tae along with Jung Da-eun were appointed as ambassadors for sharing 'Warm Day' sanitary napkin support campaign by NGO under Ministry of Foreign Affairs and Trade.

== Filmography ==
=== Films ===
Year	Title	Role	Notes	Ref.
2002	The Coast Guard	Agent 7		
2003	My Tutor Friend	In front of the house police		
2003	Acacia	Seong-joon		
2003	The Greatest Expectation			
2004	How to Keep My Love	Man with a perm		
2004	Liar	Reporter #2		
2004	Mokpo, Gangster’s Paradise			
2005	Cracked Eggs and Noodles	Police		
2005	A Bold Family	Hardware store man		
2005	Love Talk			
2006	Don't Look Back	Alumni getting married		
2006	Moodori	Tae-Won		
2011	Invisible 2: Chasing The Ghost Sound	Pil U		
2011	Scars	Sang-hyeop		
2012	Mirage	Lost and found center staff		
2012	Still Strange	Joon-seop		
2012	26 Years	Teo Mi-neol		
2013	Miracle in Cell No. 7	Night supervisor		
2013	Montage	Intercepting team		
2013	10 Minutes	Union director		
2014	Man in Love	Tae-il's doctor 1		
2014	Mad Sad Bad	Concern party		
2014	The Wicked	Se-yeong's father		
2014	The Plan	Jong-soo		
2014	Miss The Train	Suitman		
2016	Luck Key	Kim Pil-gyoo		
2017	Room No.7	Pawn shop employee		
2017	The Seeds of Violence	Section chief Park		
2018	After Spring	Dad		
2019	The Land on the Waves	Yeong-gi		
2019	My First Client	Dong-cheol		
2019	The Culprit	Lawyer Jung		
2019	Cheer Up, Mr. Lee	Police officer		
2020	Best Friend	Assistant Han		
2021	Sweet & Sour	Head of department		
2025	The Noisy Mansion			

=== Television series ===
Year	Title	Role	Notes	Ref.
2003	Stairway to Heaven			
2008	White Lie	Ahn Bi-seo		
2009	The Return of Iljimae	Woo-dol		
2010	Legend of the Patriots	North Korean People's Army		
2011	Listen to My Heart	Detective		
2011	Gwanggaeto, The Great Conqueror	Batar		
2013	Pots of Gold	Oh Sang-goo		
2014	Jeong Do-jeon	Yi Soong-in		
2014	Misaeng: Incomplete Life	Jung Hee-seok		
2015	Blood	Choi Woo-sik		
2015	In Still Green Days	Jeong Man-soo		
2015	Assembly	Im Kyu-tae		
2015	KBS Drama Special - "Strange Fairy Tale"	Gi-poong	Ep. 12 season 6	
2016	Moorim School: Saga of the Brave	Kim Dae-ho		
2016	A Beautiful Mind	Park Soo-bum		
2016	KBS Drama Special - "My Happy Home"	Doctor	Ep.4	
2016	My Mind's Flower Rain	Kang Woo-sung	Nominated for Excellence Award, Actor in a Daily Drama at 2016 KBS Drama Awards	
2017	Save Me	Homeless man	Special appearance	
2017	My Father Is Strange	Kang Woo-sung		
2017	The Package	San Ma-roo		
2017	Witch at Court	Se-na's father, detective	Cameo	
2017	Distorted	Park Jin-woo		
2018	I Picked Up a Celebrity on the Street		Special appearance	
2018	Heart Surgeons	Lee Dae-young		
2018	Radio Romance	Ahn Bong-seob		
2018	Life	Seo Ji-yong		
2018	Mr. Sunshine	Police commissioner Jung		
2019	My Lawyer, Mr. Jo 2: Crime and Punishment	Park Woo-sung		
2019	Confession	Detective Seo		
2019	Everything and Nothing	Seo-yeon's father	Ep. 4	
2019	Miss Lee	Hwang Ji-sang		
2020	Kairos	Park Joo-myeong		
2020-21	Hush	Seo Jae-won		
2021	Navillera	Young-il		
2021	Youth of May	Kim kyung-soo		
2021	Racket Boys	Hong Jeong-hyeon	Special appearance	
2021	Artificial City	Yang Won- rok		
2022	Reborn Rich	Lee Hang-jae		
2022–2023	Unlock My Boss	Managing Director Kim		

== Theater ==
Year	Title	Native title	Role	Notes/Ref.
2016	Hobby Room	취미의 방	Mizusawa	
2019	The Magician of Reading	독심의 술사	Nai-kwang	
2022	The Masked Hut Murder Case	가면산장 살인사건	Nobuhiko	

== Awards and nominations ==
Year, Name of the award ceremony, category, nominee of the award, and the result of the nomination
Award ceremony	Year	Category	Nominee / Work	Result	Ref.
KBS Drama Awards	2016	Excellence Award, Actor in a Daily Drama	My Mind's Flower Rain	Nominated	
Korea Drama Awards	2023	KDF Award	Reborn Rich	Won	
