= Hello, My Twenties! =

2016 South Korean TV series

- Season 1 promotional poster
- Also known as: Age of Youth
- Hangul: 청춘시대
- Hanja: 青春時代
- RR: Cheongchun sidae
- MR: Ch'ŏngch'un sidae
- Genre: Romance; Mystery
- Written by: Park Yeon-seon
- Directed by: Lee Tae-gon; Kim Sang-ho
- Starring: Han Ye-ri; Han Seung-yeon; Park Eun-bin; Ryu Hwa-young; Park Hye-su; Ji Woo; Choi Ara
- Country of origin: South Korea
- Original language: Korean
- No. of seasons: 2
- No. of episodes: 26

Production
- Executive producers: Ham Young-hoon; Choi Hyuk-jin; Park Joon-seo
- Producers: Park Jae-sam; Park Jun-seo; Choi Jae-suk
- Cinematography: Jeon Hyun-seok; Hong Il-seop
- Editors: Park So-young; Bae Hee-kyung
- Running time: 70 minutes
- Production companies: Drama House; Celltrion Entertainment (season 1); Take 2 Media Group (season 2)

Original release
- Network: JTBC
- Release: July 22, 2016 – October 7, 2017

Hello, My Twenties! (Korean: 청춘시대; lit. 'Age of Youth') is a South Korean television series starring Han Ye-ri, Han Seung-yeon, Park Eun-bin, Ryu Hwa-young, Park Hye-su, Ji Woo and Choi Ara. It aired on JTBC from July 22, 2016 to October 7, 2017.

== Synopsis ==
A slice-of-life story about five girls who live together in a sharehouse called "Belle Epoque" and how they connect over the growing pains in their youth. It is based on the issues that younger generations are likely to face in South Korea.

== Cast ==
=== Overview ===
Character	Portrayed by	Season	
Character	Portrayed by	Season 1 (2016)	Season 2 (2017)
Yoon Jin-myung	Han Ye-ri	Main	Main
Jung Ye-eun	Han Seung-yeon	Main	Main
Song Ji-won	Park Eun-bin	Main	Main
Kang Yi-na	Ryu Hwa-young	Main	Guest
Yoo Eun-jae	Park Hye-su	Main	
Yoo Eun-jae	Ji Woo		Main
Jo Eun	Choi Ara		Main

=== Main ===
- Park Hye-su (season 1) and Ji Woo (season 2) as Yoo Eun-jae

A 20-year-old Psychology major student who comes from the countryside.

- Han Seung-yeon as Jung Ye-eun

A 22-year-old Culinary Arts major with a religious background.

- Han Ye-ri as Yoon Jin-myung

A 28-year-old hardworking business major with a complicated family situation.

- Park Eun-bin as Song Ji-won

A 22-year-old Journalism major, a quirky adventurous roommate who claims to have the ability to see ghosts.

- Ryu Hwa-young as Kang Yi-na (season 1; guest season 2)

A 24-year-old sugar baby with expensive taste. She eventually works hard to be a career woman.

- Choi Ara as Jo Eun (season 2)

=== Recurring ===
- Yoon Park as Park Jae-wan (season 1; guest season 2)

Jin-myung's love interest, Italian restaurant chef.

- Choi Deok-moon as Oh Jong-gyu – Yi-na's mystery man
- Ji Il-joo as Go Doo-young – Ye-eun's abusive ex-boyfriend
- Shin Hyun-soo as Yoon Jong-yeol – Eun-jae's boyfriend
- Son Seung-won as Im Sung-min – Ji-won's male friend
- Yoon Jong-hoon as Seo Dong-joo – Yi-na's friend
- Kim Min-seok as Seo Jang-hoon (season 2)

Deputy of the share house, Belle Epoque's owner, Jo Eun's love interest.

- Lee You-jin as Kwon Ho-chang (season 2)

Ye-eun's love interest; an engineering student who knows nothing about dating.

- Ahn Woo-yeon as Heimdallr / Lee Jin-kwang (season 2)

A member of an idol group Asgard who is five years into his debut, but yet to reach stardom.

- Lee Ji-ha as Ho-chang's mother
- Kim Hyo-jin as Yoon Jin-myung's mother
- Lee Kyung-shim as Ahn Jung-hee – Yoo Eun-jae's mother
- Kim Yong-hee as dentist – Kang Yi-na's third lover
- Min Sung-wook as restaurant manager
- Yoon Jin-sol as Jo Hyun-hee – restaurant waitress
- Han Jeong-woo as Kang Yi-na's second lover
- Song Ji-ho as Kang Yi-na's stalker
- Ha Eun-seol as Han Yoo-kyung – Jung Ye-eun's friend
- Choi Bae-young as Song Kyung-ah – Jung Ye-eun's friend
- Kim Si-eun as young Yoon Jin-myung
- Yoon Yong-joon as Shin Yool-bin – Yoo Eun-jae's crush
- Kim Kyung-nam
- Jung Yi-seo as Ye-eun's classmate
- Kim Chang-hwan as insurance employee
- Jung Yoo-min as dancing student
- Nam Moon-cheol as Song Ji-won's father
- Kwon Eun-soo as Yoon Jong-yeol's junior
- Shin Yeon-sook as Yoo Eun-jae's aunt
- Shin Se-hwi as Ahn Ye-ji, Jo Eun's friend
- Jo Byeong-kyu as Jo Chung-han
- Kim Ye-ji as Ye-ji
- Yoon Sa-bong as Ho Chang's sister
- Seo Ye-hwa as Su & Su receptionist
- Go Min-si as Oh Ha-na

=== Special appearances ===
Season 1:

- Moon Sook as home owner grandmother

Season 2:

- Ji Il-joo as Go Doo-young
- PENTAGON (Note: The members of PENTAGON who played the members of the boy group Asgard alongside Ahn Woo-yeon are: Kino (Main Dancer, Vocalist, Sub Rapper and Face of the Group), Shinwon (Vocalist), Jinho (Main Vocalist), Yeo One (Lead Vocalist), Yuto (Lead Rapper, Lead Dancer and Sub Vocalist) and Wooseok (Main Rapper, Sub Vocalist and Maknae, i.e. the youngest member of PENTAGON).) as members of idol group Asgard
- A.C.E as members of idol group The Fifth Column
- Ji Hye-ran
- Yoon Kyung-ho as Moon Hyo-jin's boyfriend
- Kim Jung-young as Song Ji-won' mother
- Kim Hak-sun as Jo-eun's father

== Episodes ==
=== Series overview ===
Season	Episodes	Originally released	
Season	Episodes	First released	Last released
1	12	July 22, 2016	August 27, 2016
2	14	August 25, 2017	October 7, 2017

=== Season 1 (2016) ===
No. overall	No. in season	English title	Korean title	Original release date
1	1	"Fear of Takeoff #Slipper"	출발선상의 두려움 #슬리퍼	July 22, 2016
2	2	"Is This Underwear Yours? #LiesandNoMakeupFaces"	이 팬티가 네 팬티냐? #거짓말과 민낯	July 23, 2016
3	3	"I've Never Once Loved Myself #RottenRoots"	단 한번도 스스로를 사랑하지 않았노라 #썩은 구근	July 29, 2016
4	4	"My Dream is to Be an Office Worker #ProofofPoverty"	내 꿈은 회사원이다 #가난의 증명	July 30, 2016
5	5	"The Reason For Loving Someone, The Reason For Not Loving Someone #MenandWomen"	누군가를 사랑하려는 이유, 혹은 사랑하지 않으려는 이유 #남과 여	August 5, 2016
6	6	"In Retrospect, It Was Foreshadowing #StartingPoint"	알고 나면 그날의 일은 복선이 된다 #시발점	August 6, 2016
7	7	"I'm Someone Who Shouldn't Be Happy #SleepParalysis"	나는 행복하면 안 되는 사람입니다 #가위	August 12, 2016
8	8	"Hope, That Damn Hope #SuspiciousMan"	희망, 그 빌어먹을 놈의 희망 #수상한 남자	August 13, 2016
9	9	"If You Stay in Your Place, You Won't Get Lost #Shoes"	제 자리에 서 있으면 길을 잃지 않는다 #구두	August 19, 2016
10	10	"We Believe Because We Want to Believe #Lie"	우리는 믿고 싶어서 믿는다 #거짓말	August 20, 2016
11	11	"If You Watch Closely, Everyone Has Special Circumstances #Earrings"	알고 보면 모두가 특별한 사연들 #귀걸이	August 26, 2016
12	12	"Even So, Life Goes On #Aftermath"	그래도 삶은 계속된다 #후유증	August 27, 2016

=== Season 2 (2017) ===
No. overall	No. in season	English title	Korean title	Original release date
13	1	"Angry Over Small Things #TheWorldofUs"	나는 작은 것에 열 받는다 #우리들	August 25, 2017
14	2	"Coward #TheStranger"	나는 겁쟁이다 #이방인	August 26, 2017
15	3	"Decide to Hate #CrimeandPunishment"	나는 널 미워하기로 마음먹었다 #죄와벌	September 1, 2017
16	4	"To Survive #TheSelfishGene"	나는 살아남았다 #이기적 유전자	September 2, 2017
17	5	"Wavering Heart #FirstLove"	나는 마음 갈대와 같도다 #첫사랑	September 8, 2017
18	6	"I'm a Miracle #InSearchofLostTime"	나는 기적이다 #잃어버린 시간을 찾아서	September 9, 2017
19	7	"Center of the World #TheScarletLetter"	나는 세상의 중심이었다 #주홍 글씨	September 15, 2017
20	8	"Self-Dishonesty #Confessions"	나는 나를 부정한다 #고백	September 16, 2017
21	9	"Wounds #ParadiseLost"	나는 상처가 되었다 #실낙원	September 22, 2017
22	10	"Might Be Me #TheSenseofanEnding"	나일지도 모른다 #확률	September 23, 2017
23	11	"Betraying Oneself #Disgrace"	나는 나를 배신했다 #추락	September 29, 2017
24	12	"Affirming Oneself #StandbyMe"	나는 나를 긍정한다 #스탠바이미	September 30, 2017
25	13	"Seeing Oneself #AllthePrettyHorses"	나는 나를 보았다 #모두 다 예쁜 말들	October 6, 2017
26	14	"Their Mirrors #SoLongSeeYouTomorrow"	그들은 그들의 거울이 있다 #안녕 내일 또 만나	October 7, 2017

== Production ==
On February 16, 2017, the series was renewed for a second season. It was announced that Ryu Hwa-young would only make a cameo appearance, and that a new actress would be cast as the fifth girl of the Belle Epoque.

Originally, it was expected that all five main roles would be the same from the previous season. However, early on Ryu Hwa-young was removed from the main cast due to an bullying incident regarding her group, T-ara. Instead, a new character, Jo Eun, was created to fill the five-person dynamic of the show. Park Hye-soo was also supposed to be part of the main cast, but due to a scheduling conflict, she stepped down from the role. Unlike Ryu Hwa-young, this happened late into pre-production and it was decided that another actress would play her character Yoo Eun-jae; Ji Woo was cast.

Onew was originally cast in the role of Kwon Ho-chang, but he stepped down in light of controversy surrounding him ten days before the drama's premiere, and was replaced with Lee Yoo-jin.

== Ratings ==
Average TV viewership ratings (season 1)
Ep.	Original broadcast date	Average audience share	
Ep.	Original broadcast date	AGB Nielsen	TNmS
Ep.	Original broadcast date	Nationwide	
1	July 22, 2016	1.310%	0.9%
2	July 23, 2016	0.473%	1.0%
3	July 29, 2016	0.911%	1.4%
4	July 30, 2016	0.807%	0.9%
5	August 5, 2016	0.788%	1.5%
6	August 6, 2016	1.279%	1.6%
7	August 12, 2016	1.361%	1.5%
8	August 13, 2016	1.373%	1.6%
9	August 19, 2016	1.752%	2.8%
10	August 20, 2016	1.265%	1.4%
11	August 26, 2016	2.508%	2.5%
12	August 27, 2016	2.122%	2.2%
Average		1.329%	1.6%
In the table above, the blue numbers represent the lowest ratings and the red numbers represent the highest ratings.; This drama aired on a cable channel/pay TV which normally has a relatively smaller audience compared to free-to-air TV/public broadcasters (KBS, SBS, MBC and EBS).

Average TV viewership ratings (season 2)
Ep.	Original broadcast date	Average audience share		
Ep.	Original broadcast date	AGB Nielsen		TNmS
Ep.	Original broadcast date	Nationwide	Seoul	Nationwide
1	August 25, 2017	2.228%	1.995%	2.5%
2	August 26, 2017	2.405%	2.341%	2.9%
3	September 1, 2017	1.657%	—N/a	1.7%
4	September 2, 2017	2.431%	2.256%	3.1%
5	September 8, 2017	2.248%	—N/a	2.8%
6	September 9, 2017	2.817%	2.658%	3.2%
7	September 15, 2017	2.839%	2.825%	3.1%
8	September 16, 2017	3.099%	3.092%	3.0%
9	September 22, 2017	2.772%	2.674%	2.7%
10	September 23, 2017	3.145%	3.029%	4.0%
11	September 29, 2017	3.657%	3.494%	3.6%
12	September 30, 2017	4.069%	3.725%	4.2%
13	October 6, 2017	3.040%	2.893%	2.8%
14	October 7, 2017	3.252%	2.960%	4.1%
Average		2.836%	2.829%	3.1%
In the table above, the blue numbers represent the lowest ratings and the red numbers represent the highest ratings.; N/A denotes that the rating is not known.; This drama aired on a cable channel/pay TV which normally has a relatively smaller audience compared to free-to-air TV/public broadcasters (KBS, SBS, MBC and EBS).

== Original soundtrack ==
No.	Title	Artist	Length
1.	"The Whereabouts Of Love"	Maximilian Hecker	05:00
2.	"On Your Collarbone"	Jordan Klassen	04:19
3.	"Enjoy The View"	David Choi	03:31
4.	"Offbeat"	Clara C	03:12
5.	"24 hours"	Mayu Wakisaka	03:51
6.	"Toodoo"	The Tellers	03:39
7.	"What Up?"	Hector Guerra	03:36
8.	"Dick & Jane"	Sidney York	02:18
9.	"Mirage Of Bliss (part I)"	Maximilian Hecker	03:39
Total length:			33:05

== Awards and nominations ==
Year	Award	Category	Recipient	Result
2016	9th Korea Drama Awards	Hallyu Star Award	Han Seung-yeon	Won
2016	1st Asia Artist Awards	Rising Star Award	Shin Hyun-soo	Won
2016	1st Asia Artist Awards	Rising Star Award	Park Hye-su	Won
2017	53rd Baeksang Arts Awards	Most Popular Actress (Television)	Park Hye-su	Nominated
