= Kim Yeong-cheol (actor) =

South Korean actor

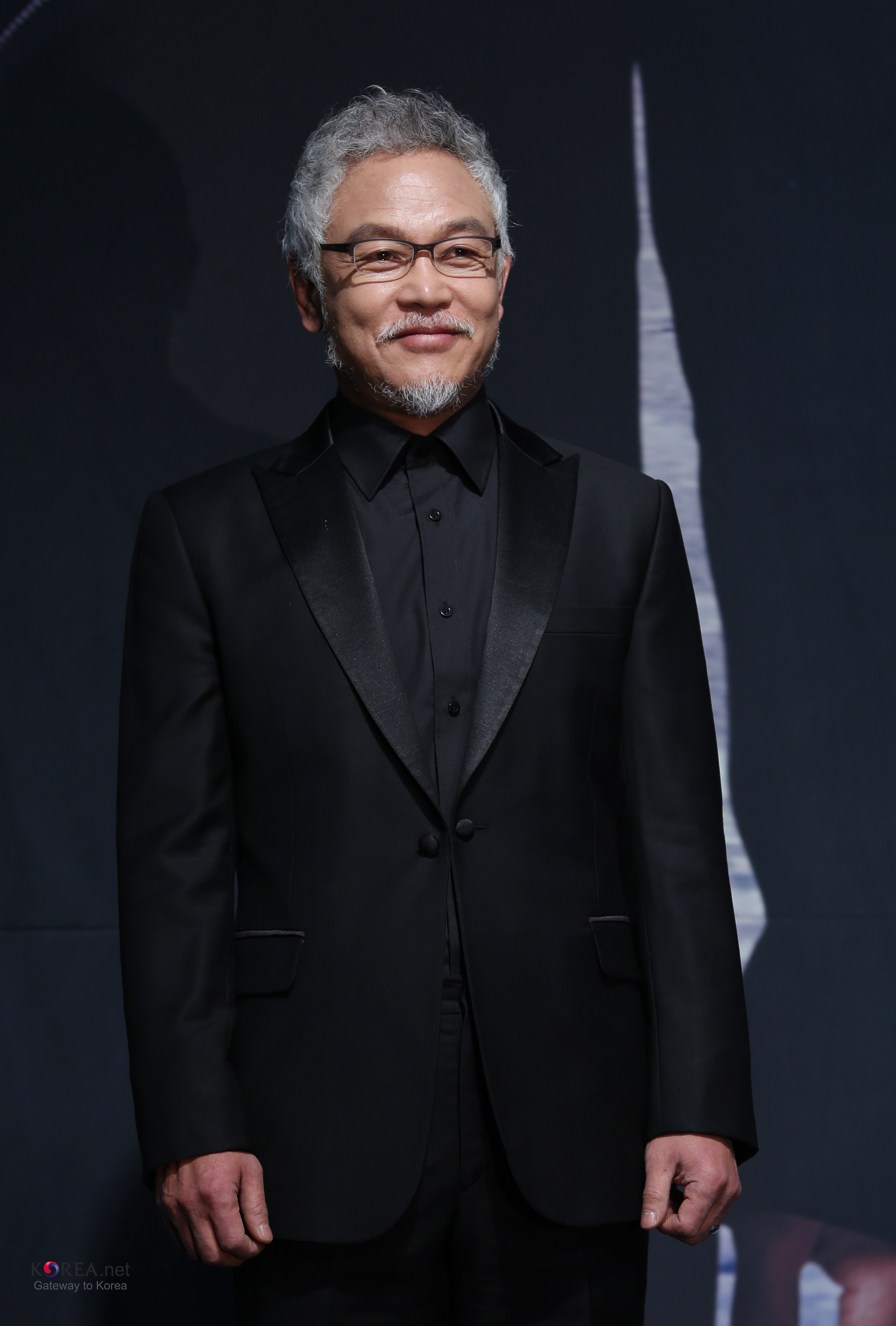
- Kim in 2013
- Born: Daegu, South Korea
- Other name: Kim Young-chul
- Occupation: Actor
- Years active: 1973–present
- Spouse: Lee Moon-hee
- Children: 2

Korean name
- Hangul: 김영철
- Hanja: 金永哲
- RR: Gim Yeongcheol
- MR: Kim Yŏngch'ŏl

Kim Yeong-cheol (Korean: 김영철) is a South Korean actor. One of his earliest appearances was in White Smile (1981). Other notable roles include playing Gung Ye in Emperor Wang Gun (2000–2002), a gangster boss in A Bittersweet Life (2005), and a NSS deputy director in IRIS (2009).

== Filmography ==
=== Television ===
Year	English Title	Hangul	Role
2021	The King of Tears, Lee Bang-won	태종 이방원	King Taejo
2021	Times	타임즈	Seo Gi-tae
2020	Royal Secret Agent	암행어사	
2019	My Country: The New Age	나의 나라	King Taejo
2017	Criminal Minds	크리미널 마인드	Baek San
2017	My Father Is Strange	아버지가 이상해	Byun Han-soo/Lee Yoon-seok
2016	Happy Home	가화만사성	Bong Sam-bong
2016	Jang Yeong-sil	장영실	King Taejong
2015	KBS Drama Special "The Wind Blows to the Hope"	드라마 스페셜 - 바람은 소망하는 곳으로 분다	Detective Jo Seong-gi
2014	Wonderful Days	참 좋은 시절	Kang Tae-sup
2014	Beyond the Clouds	태양은 가득히	Han Tae-oh
2013	The Blade and Petal	칼과 꽃	King Yeongnyu
2013	Iris II: New Generation	아이리스 2	Baek San
2012	The Innocent Man	세상 어디에도 없는 착한 남자	Seo Jung-gyu
2012	The Moon and the Stars for You	별도 달도 따줄게	Seo Man-ho
2012	Man from the Equator	적도의 남자	Jin No-shik
2012	Daddy's Sorry	아버지가 미안하다	Yong-man
2011	The Princess' Man	공주의 남자	Grand Prince Suyang
2011	Dancing with the Stars	댄싱 위드 더 스타	Himself (contestant)
2010	Athena: Goddess of War	아테나: 전쟁의 여신	Baek San (cameo)
2010	Life Is Beautiful	인생은 아름다워	Yang Byung-tae
2010	The Reputable Family	명가	Choi Jin-lip
2009	Iris	아이리스	Baek San
2008	Returned Earthen Bowl	돌아온 뚝배기	President Kang
2008	The Great King, Sejong	대왕세종	King Taejong
2006	How Much Love	얼마나 좋길래	Lee Dae-yang
2006	Seoul 1945	서울 1945	Moon Jung-kwan
2002	Rustic Period	야인시대	Older Kim Du-han
2002	Man in Crisis	위기의 남자	Lee Dong-joo
2000	Emperor Wang Gun	태조 왕건	Gung Ye
1998	Letters Written on a Cloudy Day	흐린날에 쓴 편지	Young-beom
1998	Spring After Winter	겨울 지나고 봄	Lee Dong-jin
1997	Spring Days Are Gone	봄날은 간다	
1997	Because I Really	정 때문에	Nam Ki-nam
1996	A Far Away Country	머나먼 나라	Kim Jae-goo
1996	Meeting	만남	Yoo Kang-ae's husband
1995	Sons of the Wind	바람의 아들	
1995	Old House	오래된 집	
1995	Earthquake	땅울림	
1994	With You	그대 있음에	Jang Hyun-sae
1993	How's Your Husband?	댁의 남편은 어떠십니까?	
1993	Wild Aster	들국화	Jong-soo
1992	Time and Tears	시간과 눈물	
1992	Hyung (My Older Brother)	형	Dong-shin
1991	The Royal Way	왕도 (王道)	Hong Guk-young
1991	Bait and Reins	미끼와 고삐	Sung-ha
1990	People and People	사람과 사람	
1989	History Flows	역사는 흐른다	
1989	Sunrise	일출	
1989	Two Sunsets	두 석양	
1988	Famine in the City	도시의 흉년	Gu Joo-hyun
1988	The Winter Was Warm That Year	그해 겨울은 따뜻했네	
1988	Human Market	인간시장	
1987	Land	토지	Kim Hwan
1986	Windfall	노다지	

=== Film ===
Year	English Title	Hangul	Role
2014	The Con Artists	기술자들	Boss Cho
2010	Iris: The Movie	아이리스: 더 무비	Baek San
2007	My Father	마이 파더	Hwang Nam-cheol
2007	Voice of a Murderer	그놈 목소리	Kim Wook-jung
2005	A Bittersweet Life	달콤한 인생	Mr. Kang
2000	Asako in Ruby Shoes	순애보	Jong-hwan
1995	The Great Hunter G. J.	위대한 헌터 G.J.	
1992	The Woman Everyone Wanted to Kill	모두가 죽이고 싶었던 여자	
1991	Mature Outing	성숙한 외출, 시간과 눈물	Boyfriend
1989	Speeding Horse	달아난 말	
1989	Shock Continues Long	그후로도 오랫동안	
1988	Karma	업	
1987	Young-ja in Her Prime in 1987	87 영자의 전성시대	
1985	Half-eaten Cherry Apple	먹다버린 능금	
1980	The Wooden Horse That Went to Sea	바다로 간 목마	
1980	White Smile	하얀 미소	
1979	Butterfly Amongst Flowers		
1979	Celadon (Jade Color)	비색	
1979	A Love Song in a Peanut Shell	땅콩껍질 속의 연가	
1971		인기유학생	

=== Television shows ===
Year	Title	Role	Notes	Ref.
2018–2022	Kim Young-chul's One Round Around the Neighborhood	Host	Season 1	

== Awards and nominations ==
Year	Award	Category	Nominated work	Result
2022	KBS Drama Awards	Excellence Award, Actor in a Serial Drama	The King of Tears, Lee Bang-won	Nominated
2017	KBS Drama Awards	Daesang (Grand Prize)	My Father Is Strange	Won
2017	KBS Drama Awards	Top Excellence Award, Actor	My Father Is Strange	Nominated
2017	KBS Drama Awards	Excellence Award, Actor in a Serial Drama	My Father Is Strange	Nominated
2012	KBS Drama Awards	Excellence Award, Actor in a Daily Drama	The Moon and Stars for You	Won
2011	KBS Drama Awards	Top Excellence Award, Actor	The Princess' Man	Nominated
2010	SBS Drama Awards	Top Excellence Award, Actor in a Weekend/Daily Drama	Life Is Beautiful	Nominated
2008	KBS Drama Awards	Excellence Award, Actor in a Daily Drama	Returned Earthen Bowl	Nominated
2008	16th Chunsa Film Art Awards	Best Supporting Actor	My Father	Won
2007	28th Blue Dragon Film Awards	Best Supporting Actor	My Father	Nominated
2007	1st Korea Drama Awards	Special Award	How Much Love	Won
2003	SBS Drama Awards	Excellence Award, Actor in a Daily/Weekend Drama	Rustic Period	Won
2003	SBS Drama Awards	Top 10 Stars	Rustic Period	Won
2001	Korea Best Dressed Awards	Special Award	—N/a	Won
2001	28th Korea Broadcasting Awards	TV Actor ("Talent") Award	Emperor Wang Gun	Won
2001	37th Baeksang Arts Awards	Best TV Actor	Emperor Wang Gun	Won
2000	KBS Drama Awards	Daesang (Grand Prize)	Emperor Wang Gun	Won
2000	13th Grimae Awards	Best Actor	Emperor Wang Gun	Won
1996	KBS Drama Awards	Excellence Award, Actor		Won
1991	KBS Drama Awards	Top Excellence Award, Actor	The Royal Way	Won
1989	25th Baeksang Arts Awards	Best TV Actor	Two Sunsets	Won
1987	KBS Drama Awards	Excellence Award, Actor		Won
1985	KBS Drama Awards	Excellence Award, Actor		Won

=== State honors ===
Name of country, year given, and name of honor
Country	Year	Honor	Ref.
South Korea (Note: Honors are given at the Korean Popular Culture and Arts Awards, arranged by the Korea Creative Content Agency and hosted by the Ministry of Culture, Sports and Tourism. They are awarded to those who have contributed to the arts and South Korea's pop culture.)	2021	Presidential Commendation	

== See also ==
- Cinema of Korea
