= Ex-Girlfriends' Club =

- Genre: Romance; Comedy
- Written by: Lee Jin-mae
- Directed by: Kwon Seok-jang
- Starring: Byun Yo-han; Song Ji-hyo; Lee Yoon-ji; Jang Ji-eun; Ryu Hwa-young
- Composer: Kang Min-guk
- Country of origin: South Korea
- Original language: Korean
- No. of episodes: 12

Production
- Executive producers: Lee Jin-seok; Lee Chan-ho
- Producers: Yoo Hyun-ki; Choi Jin-hee; Park Ji-young
- Cinematography: Han Se-hyun; Hwang Jin-dong
- Editors: Lee Hyun-mi; Hwang Yi-seul
- Running time: 60 minutes
- Production company: JS Pictures

Original release
- Network: tvN
- Release: May 8 – June 13, 2015

Ex-Girlfriends' Club (Korean: 구여친클럽; RR: Guyeochinkeulleop; lit. 'Ex-Girlfriend Club') is a 2015 South Korean television series starring Byun Yo-han, Song Ji-hyo, Lee Yoon-ji, Jang Ji-eun and Ryu Hwa-young. It aired on tvN from May 8 to June 13, 2015 on Fridays and Saturdays at 20:30 for 12 episodes.

Originally scheduled for 16 episodes, the series was cut down to 12 episodes when ratings proved disappointing.

== Plot ==
Bang Myung-soo is a popular writer of webtoons. He then writes a webtoon series about his past relationships, specifically his three ex-girlfriends, which includes an older, wealthy divorcee, a chic and successful woman who works at an investment firm, and a third-rate, airhead actress. The webtoon reveals plenty of details about Myung-soo's love life, and it becomes a huge hit. Soon, Myung-soo is considered a cross between Public Enemy Number One and National Heartthrob, and his webtoon gets adapted into a movie.

Kim Soo-jin is a film producer who's prepared to do whatever it takes to save their failing production company. Because of this, she accepts the assignment to produce a webtoon adaptation. But to her horror, Soo-jin belatedly finds out that the webtoon artist is her ex-boyfriend Myung-soo, who is writing about his ex-girlfriends. And as the movie starts shooting, the project also brings Myung-soo's other ex-girlfriends back into his life all at the same time.

== Cast ==
=== Main ===
- Song Ji-hyo as Kim Soo-jin (32)
- Byun Yo-han as Bang Myung-soo (32)
- Jang Ji-eun as Na Ji-ah (34, Myung-soo's first love)
- Lee Yoon-ji as Jang Hwa-young (32, Myung-soo's third love)
- Ryu Hwa-young as Goo Geun-hyung/Ra Ra (27, Myung-soo's second love)

=== Extended Cast ===
- Do Sang-woo as Jo Gun (35)
- Jo Jung-chi as Choi Ji-hoon (32, Soo-kyung's husband)
- Shin Dong-mi as Kim Soo-kyung (34, Soo-jin's elder sister)
- Kang Soo-jin as Song Eun-hye (27)
- Go Hyun as Lee Jin-bae (27, Cartoonist)
- Park Pal-young
- Son Jong-hak
- Choi Seung-hoon as Seong-hyeon (Soo-jin's nephew)
- Chae Jung-an as Baek Soo-hee (cameo, ep 1)

== Ratings ==
In this table, the blue numbers represent the lowest ratings and the red numbers represent the highest ratings.

| Ep. | Original broadcast date | Average audience share |
| Ep. | Original broadcast date | AGB Nielsen |
| Ep. | Original broadcast date | Nationwide |
|---|---|---|
| 1 | May 8, 2015 | 1.16% |
| 2 | May 9, 2015 | 0.90% |
| 3 | May 15, 2015 | 0.65% |
| 4 | May 16, 2015 | 0.72% |
| 5 | May 22, 2015 | 0.70% |
| 6 | May 23, 2015 | 0.88% |
| 7 | May 29, 2015 | 0.64% |
| 8 | May 30, 2015 | 0.81% |
| 9 | June 5, 2015 | 0.91% |
| 10 | June 6, 2015 | 0.64% |
| 11 | June 12, 2015 | 0.63% |
| 12 | June 13, 2015 | 0.78% |
| Average | | 0.79% |

- This drama airs on a cable channel/pay TV which normally has a relatively smaller audience compared to free-to-air TV/public broadcasters (KBS, SBS, MBC and EBS).

== International broadcast ==
| Country | Network(s)/Station(s) | Series premiere | Title |
|---|---|---|---|
| South Korea | TVN | May 8, 2015 – June 13, 2015 (tvN金土連續劇) | 구여친클럽 ( ; lit: ) |
| Singapore | Hub VV Drama | May 31, 2015 – July 5, 2015 (Korea Speed Honey Sunday 21:30 – 23:45) | 前女友俱樂部 ( ; lit: ) |
| Hong Kong | TVB Network Vision (Korean Drama) | January 2, 2016 – February 6, 2016 (Saturday 13:30 – 15:55, 18:30 – 21:00 and 23:30 – 01:45) | 前女友俱樂部 ( ; lit: ) |
| Hong Kong | TVBTVB J2 | June 17, 2016 – July 7, 2016 (Monday to Friday 23:05 – 00:00) | 前女友俱樂部 ( ; lit: ) |
| Malaysia | TV2 | April 24, 2018 – June 10, 2018 (Sunday to Tuesday 20:35 – 21:30); November 15, 2018 – December 18, 2018 (Sunday to Tuesday 20:35 – 21:30) | Ex-Girlfriend Club |
| Thailand | True4U | July 18, 2018 – August 23, 2018 (Every Wednesday and Thursday at 20:30 – 21:30) | มะรุมมะตุ้ม...คนรักเก่า ( ; lit: ) |
| Myanmar | Channel 7 | February 15, 2018 (Every Monday to Friday at 7: 00 PM) အခ်စ္ဆံုခ်စ္သူ | |
