= Jung Joon-won (actor, born 2004) =

South Korean actor

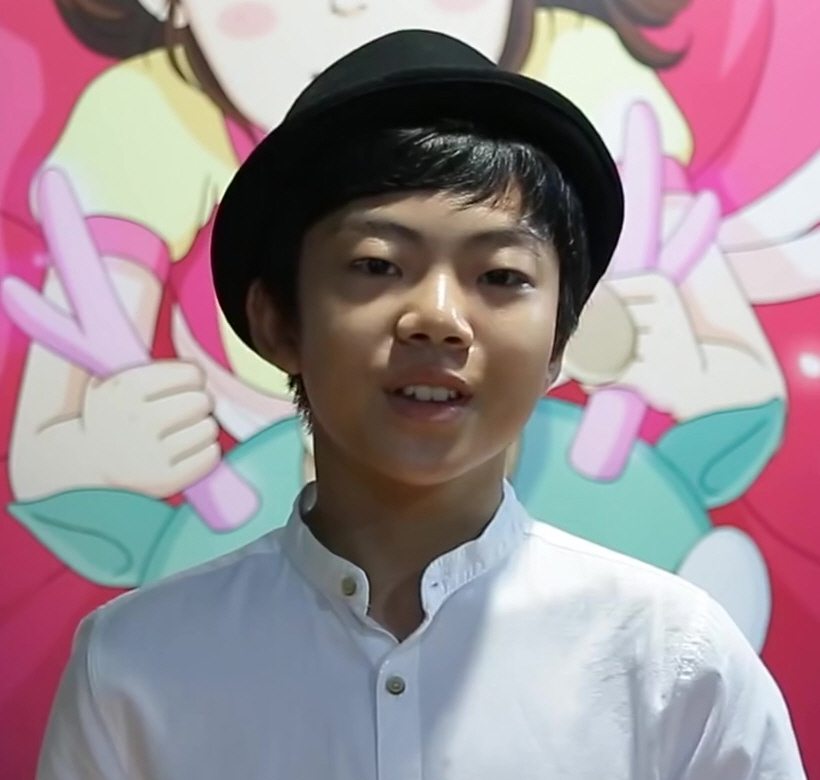
- Jung in 2016
- Born: 26 July 2004 (age 21); Gimhae, South Gyeongsang, South Korea
- Occupation: Actor

Korean name
- Hangul: 정준원
- RR: Jeong Junwon
- MR: Chŏng Chunwŏn

Jung Joon-won (Korean: 정준원; born 26 July 2004) is a South Korean actor.

== Filmography ==
=== Television series ===
Year	Title	Role	Notes
2009	Wife Returns	Kindergarten kid	
2010	Queen of Reversals		Cameo, episode 26
2011	City Hunter	Song Do-jin	Guest, episode 2-3 and 5
2011	Miss Ajumma	Yoo-jin	Guest
2011	Deep Rooted Tree	child with bone cancer	
2011	Living Among the Rich	Joon-won	
2012	Remember You		
2012	Angel's Choice	Young-min	
2012	Family		
2012	Quiz of God 3	Woo-ram	Cameo, episode 4
2012	Goodbye Dear Wife	Hoon	Guest
2012	Arang and the Magistrate	Kid	Cameo
2012	The Great Seer	King Woo (young)	Guest
2013	Gu Family Book	Choi Kang-chi (young)	
2013	The Scandal	Jang Eun-joong (8-year-old)	
2013	Potato Star 2013QR3	Kim Kyu-ho	
2014	KBS Drama Special	Soo-cheol	Episode "Bomi's Room"
2014	Healer		
2016	The Royal Gambler		
2017	Voice	Hwang Kyung-il (young)	Guest, episode 4-6
2017	Saimdang, Memoir of Colors	Lee Hyun-rong	
2017	My Father Is Strange	Na Min-ha	
2017	Circle	Lee Dong-soo (young)	
2017	Criminal Minds	Kim Jin-woo	Guest, episode 9-10
2017	Save Me	Jung-goo	
2017	Black	Jang Hyun-soo	Guest, episode 10-18
2017	Jugglers	Park Gun-woo	
2018	100 Days My Prince	Yoon Seok-ha (young)	
2019	Hello, Today	Jung In-won	
2019	The Great Show	Han Tak	
2020	The World of the Married	Cha Hae-kang	

=== Film ===
Year	Title	Role
2012	Pacemaker	Joo Seong-ho (young)
2012	The Concubine	Prince (voice only)
2013	South Bound	Ji-ho
2013	Happiness for Sale	Eung-cheol
2013	Hide and Seek	Ho-se
2013	The Attorney	Song Gun-woo
2015	The Chronicles of Evil	Myeong-ho
2015	The Piper	Chul-soo
2016	A Melody to Remember	Dong-goo
2016	Twenty Again	Han-bit
2017	My Little Brother	Nak-Oh
2017	The Mimic	Soon-ja's older brother (voice) (Special appearance)
2017	Chang-ok's Letters	Je-sung
2018	Seven Years of Night	Choi Hyun-soo (young)

== Awards and nominations ==
Year	Award	Category	Nominated work	Result
2017	KBS Drama Awards	Best Young Actor	My Father is Strange	Won
