= Mr. Plankton =

2024 South Korean television series

- Promotional poster
- Hangul: Mr. 플랑크톤
- RR: Mr. Peullangkeuton
- MR: Mr. P'ŭllangk'ŭt'on
- Genre: Romantic comedy Dark comedy
- Written by: Jo-young
- Directed by: Hong Jong-chan
- Starring: Woo Do-hwan; Lee Yoo-mi; Oh Jung-se; Kim Hae-sook
- Music by: Kim Tae-seong
- Country of origin: South Korea
- Original language: Korean
- No. of episodes: 10

Production
- Running time: 57–77 minutes
- Production companies: Base Story; HighZium Studio

Original release
- Network: Netflix
- Release: November 8, 2024

Mr. Plankton (Korean: Mr. 플랑크톤) is a 2024 South Korean romantic comedy television series written by Jo Yong, directed by Hong Jong-chan, and starring Woo Do-hwan, Lee Yoo-mi, Oh Jung-se, and Kim Hae-sook. The series tells the story of Hae-jo, a man who was the result of an error in artificial insemination, as he forces Jae-mi to accompany him on his last journey after learning he is terminally ill. It was released on Netflix on November 8, 2024.

== Synopsis ==
Mr. Plankton is a romantic comedy about a woman, Jae-mi, as she is forced by Hae-jo, a man who was the product of an incorrect artificial insemination, to accompany him on his last journey in life after learning he is terminally ill. Jae-mi also learns she has a medical problem, which is devastating to her.

== Cast and characters ==
=== Main ===
- Woo Do-hwan as Hae Jo/Chae Seung-hyeok

A terminally ill man who was born from a mistake.

- Lee Yoo-mi as Jo Jae-mi

A 28-year-old woman who has premature menopause.

- Oh Jung-se as Eo Heung

The only son of the 500-year-old, ancient Eo clan's main family and Jae-mi's fiancé.

- Kim Hae-sook as Bum Ho-ja

Eo Heung's mother and the daughter-in-law of the Eo clan's main family for 60 years.

=== Supporting ===
- Kim Min-seok as Yoo Ki-ho/Kkari

Hae jo's colleague

- Lee El as Bong suk/Ju Ri

Hae Jo's childhood friend

- Oh Dae-hwan as Wang Chil-seong

Leader of the Prince Gang, a crime gang.

- Lee Hae Young as Chae Yeong-jo

Hae Jo's father

- Alex Landi as John Na
- Kim Soo-jin as Park Gal-ja
- Ahn Suk-hwan as O Man-soo

Owner of a sundae shop and the first candidate for Hae-jo's biological father.

- Jo Han-chul as Ko Jae-geun

the second candidate for Hae-jo's biological father.

- Kim Jung-ho as Shin Myeong-su

Pharmaceutical company boss and the third candidate for Hae-Jo's biological father.

=== Others ===
- Nam Mi-jung as hospital lobby mom

== Production ==
=== Development ===
The series, which consists of ten episodes, was directed by Hong Jong-chan, who previously directed Juvenile Justice (2022) and written by Jo-young, who previously wrote It's Okay to Not Be Okay (2020). It is produced by Base Story and HighZium Studio.

=== Casting ===
On July 12, 2023, Netflix revealed the casting of Woo Do-hwan, Lee Yoo-mi, Oh Jung-se, and Kim Hae-sook.

== Release ==
Mr. Plankton was released on Netflix on November 8, 2024, with all its ten episodes.

== Reception ==
=== Critical response ===
On the review aggregator website Rotten Tomatoes, 40% of 5 critics' reviews are positive, with an average rating of 5.7/10.

=== Controversy ===
On October 16, 2023, the production company of the series told Newsen about a netizen's claim that the filming crew illegally dumped trash after filming on Jeju Island. The production company stated, "We filmed from the morning to the afternoon on October 15 at Hwasun Golden Sand Beach. Since filming ended after sunset, we had planned to clean up over two days, that day and the next morning. After checking, we found that the production team was even more careful and finished cleaning this morning. We will be even more careful during filming in the future."

=== Listicles ===
Name of publisher, year listed, name of listicle, and placement
Publisher	Year	Listicle	Placement	Ref.
Time Magazine	2024	The 10 Best K-Dramas of 2024	10th place	
