= My Father Is Strange =

2017 South Korean television series

- Promotional poster
- Hangul: 아버지가 이상해
- Hanja: 아버지가 異常해
- Lit.: Father is Strange
- RR: Abeojiga isanghae
- MR: Abŏjiga isanghae
- Genre: Family comedy drama
- Created by: KBS Drama Production (KBS 드라마 제작국)
- Written by: Lee Jung Sun
- Directed by: Lee Jae-sang
- Creative directors: Jung Yeo-jin; Jung Kwang-shik
- Starring: Kim Yeong-cheol; Kim Hae-sook; Ryu Soo-young; Lee Yu-ri; Lee Joon; Jung So-min; Min Jin-woong; Ryu Hwa-young; Ahn Hyo-seop
- Composer: Gaemi (개미)
- Country of origin: South Korea
- Original language: Korean
- No. of episodes: 52

Production
- Executive producers: Bae Kyung-soo; Teddy Hoon-tak Jung; Hwang Ki-yong
- Producer: Cho Woong
- Cinematography: Lee Yoon-jung
- Editor: Jung Hyun-kyung
- Camera setup: Single-camera
- Running time: 65 min
- Production company: iHQ

Original release
- Network: KBS2
- Release: March 4 – August 27, 2017

My Father is Strange (Korean: 아버지가 이상해) is a 2017 South Korean television series starring Kim Yeong-cheol, Kim Hae-sook, Ryu Soo-young, Lee Yu-ri, Lee Joon, Jung So-min, Min Jin-woong, Ryu Hwa-young, and Ahn Hyo-seop. The series aired on KBS2 every Saturday and Sunday from 7:55 p.m. to 9:15 p.m. (KST). The TV series gained huge popularity and was extended by 2 episodes (original 50).

== Synopsis ==
About a middle class family that lives on the outskirts of Seoul which consists of the father, his wife, their three daughters, and their one son. However, one day, a young man, who is a celebrity, shows up at the household claiming that he is the son of the family.

== Cast ==
=== Main ===
- Kim Yeong-cheol as Byun Han-su/Lee Yoon-seok (60) — He is the owner of Father's Snack Bar and the patriarch of the family. He was a former Judo player back in high school but after being accused of a crime he did not do, he ended up going to jail and ruining his future. His identity was changed to Byun Han-soo after getting his identity switched with his best friend due to an accident. He was forced to keep this new identity after his wife Young-shil got pregnant with Joon-young, and decided that living as Byun Han-su would give him the opportunity to restart his life and save his children from the repercussions of being known as a criminal's children. Years later, when Ahn Joong-hee tracks him down, he learns that Joong-hee is the real Han-su's son and could not refuse Joong-hee's request to move in with him and his family out of guilt for the identity switch, and he decides to be the father that Joong-hee never had. He eventually grows to love Joong-hee and cares for him sincerely like his own son. They eventually become a real family when Joong-hee decides to marry Mi-yeong. With the help of his daughter Hye-young, Yoon-seok manages to clear his name and at the end of the series, he reverts to his actual name, and manages to get a driver's licence for the first time.
- Kim Hae-sook as Na Young-sil (58) — Lee Yoon-seok's wife and the matriarch of the family. She helps Yoon-seok with the snack bar while raising her four children. She first met her husband at a hospital while she was working as a nurse. She was also the only one who believed his innocence and stood by him after he was released from jail. After learning that she was pregnant with Joon-young, she begged Yoon-seok to maintain his new identity as Byun Han-su for the sake of their child and his future. She is known to be very protective of her family and goes to great lengths to ensure that their children never learned of their father's true identity. She also does the driving for her husband since due to his switched identity, he could not obtain a driver's licence.
- Ryu Soo-young as Cha Jeong-hwan (38)— The only child of Cha Gyu-taek and Oh Bok-nyeo. Even though he works as a PD at KBC studios, his show is losing popularity which caused the company to cancel his show. He was in a relationship with Hye-young while they were in college but broke up after his mother forced Hye-young to break up with him. He eventually gets back together with Hye-young and they get married, despite his mother's strong disapproval of her. He also manages to come up with a new show about marriage counseling after being inspired by his own parents, and the show goes on to receive good ratings, which revives his career. He is shown to be fully supportive of Hye-young and her career, and even provides support and assistance when she was working on clearing her father's name.
- Lee Yu-ri as Byeon Hye-yeong/Lee Hye-yeong (34)—She is a lawyer and Lee Yoon-seok's and Na Young-shil's eldest daughter and 2nd child. She dated Cha Jung-hwan back in college but broke up after Jung-hwan's mother forced her to break up with him. After sleeping with him from fighting, they decide to start dating again and they eventually get married. Her personality is known for acting pretty while she is working. Hye-young eventually is the person responsible for restoring her father's good name as she embarks on the arduous task of proving his innocence from a case that happened a long time ago. Hye-young also gains fame from her success with her father's case, giving her access to more clients.
- Lee Joon as Ahn Joong-hee (36)— He is an idol-singer turned actor at Gabi Entertainment and the real Byun Han-soo's son. He lived in the U.S before moving to Korea to become an idol. Although he is an actor, he could not really act well which caused him to miss out on opportunities on doing more popular acting jobs like a mini series. After finally being cast on one, he decided to move with the Byuns/Lees, to know what it is like living with his "father", to help him with his acting. Living with the Byuns/Lees actually improves his acting skill and his image so much that he becomes famous again. He later starts to fall for Mi-young which causes him to believe that he is crazy because she is supposed to be his half-sister. He struggles with his feelings for Mi-Young and his anger at her father for posing as his father and betraying his trust. Eventually, he learns to forgive Yoon-seok and his wife Young-sil for their betrayal as he understands their reasons and he also has grown to love the family like his own. He also gets together with Mi-Yeong and they become engaged at the end of the series.
- Jung So-min as Byeon Mi-yeong/Lee Mi-yeong (31) — She is Lee Yoon-seok and Na Young-shil's 2nd daughter and the 3rd child of the family. She is a former Judo athlete and after suffering from a career-ending shoulder injury, became depressed, which caused her to be overweight. After deciding to start her life again, she decides to lose weight and find a job. She eventually gets a job as an intern at Gabi Entertainment and later as Ahn Joong-hee's manager. Although she gets a job at Gabi Entertainment, she is having troubles working there since a girl named Kim Yoo-joo who bullied her back in high school due to her weight, works there. Kim Yoo Joo also holds a more senior position in the company, and even ends up getting pregnant by and marries her brother, adding to her woes. She eventually changes her mind on Yoo-joo and truly forgives and accepts her after Yoo-joo finally shows remorse and apologizes for her past actions. She also begins to develop feelings for Ahn Joong-hee, causing great inner turmoils as she believes that they are half siblings. After the whole truth on her father's real identity is revealed, Mi-Yeong and Joong-Hee finally get together and later become engaged. She is also implied to have gotten a permanent job with another entertainment company.
- Min Jin-woong as Byun Joon-young/Lee Joon-young (35) — He is a 9th Grade Civil Servant and Lee Yoon-seok and Na Young-shil's oldest son and 1st child. He has been taking and studying his Civil Servant exam for almost 5 years and he eventually passes the test his 5th year. He has been dating Kim Yoo-joo while studying for his exam but after getting her pregnant by accident, they decide to get married. Initially shown as irresponsible, Joon-young eventually changes and steps up to the plate to become the eldest child of the family during their toughest time. He is also shown to possess great dislike for Joong-hee, as he seems to feel inferior to Joong-hee in every aspect, even though he changes his mind about him later, and starts to become nice and caring to Joong-hee.
  - Oh Jae-moo as young Byun Joon-young
- Ryu Hwa-young as Byeon Ra-yeong/Lee Ra-yeong (27) — She is a yoga instructor and Lee Yoon-seok and Na Young-shil's youngest daughter and 4th child. She is always known for using her social media account constantly and is always the first one to find out her siblings' dating secret. She meets Park Chul-soo when he gets a job as a soccer coach at the training center she works at. She at first thought he was gay after mistaking his twin brother as his boyfriend. She eventually starts to date him after he confesses his attraction to her. Eventually, she discovers her talent in sales and works at Chul-soo's father's company at the home shopping section.
- Ahn Hyo-seop as Park Chul-soo — A former soccer player and a soccer coach at the training center. He is actually from a rich family but after refusing to work at the family business, he decides to run away and cut all financial ties with them, causing him to sleep in the night duty room at the training center. He eventually dates Ra-young after confessing his feelings to her. Due to her influence, his father eventually approves of Ra-young and decides to support his interest and career choice instead of forcing him to work for the family business.

=== Supporting ===
==== Byun's household ====
- Lee Mi-do as Kim Yoo-joo — She is Gabi Entertainment Art Team Leader and Joon-young's wife after he got her pregnant. She bullied Mi-young back in high school because she was jealous how Mi-young's father treated her. Yoo-joo's mother left her which caused her father to get remarried.
- Park Hye-sook as Kim Mal-boon — Na Young-shil and Na Young-shik's mother.
- Lee Jun-hyeok as Na Young-shik — Na Young-shil's younger brother and Lee Bo-mi's husband. His family was doing well with business until his business partner stole all his money and ran away which caused his family to be bankrupt. His former business partner later comes back and gives half the money back and uses that money to open a pizza parlor after winning a pizza contest with his wife.
- Jang So-yeon as Lee Bo-mi — Na Young-shik's wife. She tries to make a living by selling homemade dish rags after her husband's business went bankrupt. After winning a pizza contest with her husband and getting pregnant with twins, she eventually opens the pizza parlor with her family.
- Jung Joon-won as Na Min-ha — Na Young-shik and Lee Bo-mi's son. He is a straight A student who is always the top of his class. He gets invited to be enrolled at a Science and Technology High School but chooses not to due to tuition. After meeting a pretty math teacher from a different high school, he decides to go there instead.

==== Cha Jung-hwan's family ====
- Kang Seok-woo as Cha Kyoo-taek – Cha Jung-hwan's father and a retired journalist who never got a scope. Although he retired, he never cares for his wife Oh Bok-nyeo and only cares for his dog Chico.
- Song Ok-sook as Oh Bok-nyeo – Cha Jung-hwan's mother and the owner of the building Lee Yoon-seok and his family lives in. She tries really hard to get her husband to pay attention to her no matter how hard she tries. She was really against the idea of Jung-hwan and Hye-young dating and she is against it more after getting into a fight with Na Young-shil.

==== People around Park Chul-soo ====
- Song Won-seok as Park Young-hee — Park Chul-soo's brother
- Lee Hyun-joo
- Yang Hak-jin as Yeon Tae-soo
- Lee Byung-joon as Park Hong-ik — Park Chul-soo's father

==== Extended ====
- Jung Hee-tae as Kang Woo-sung — Gabi Entertainment General Manager
- Kang Da-bin as Jin Sung-joon — Popular actor
- Sora Jung as Ahn Soo-jin — Joong-hee's mother
- Nam Tae-bu as Nam Tae-bu — Ahn Joong-hee's manager
- Lee Bong-ryun as Yoon-ryeon
- Choi Dae-sung as Deputy Director — Director of Jung-hwan's Broadcasting Station
- Jung Soo-kyo as Jong-bum — Jung-hwan's junior PD
- Kim Da-ye as Im Yeon-ji — Jung-hwan's junior PD
- Yoon Young-min as Team leader Lee Se-jin — Gabi Entertainment Management Team Manager
- Lee Chang as Ryoo Gyoon-sang — Director of the drama 'Oh My Boss'
- Jo Hyun-jin as Team leader Lim Jung-yoon — Gabi Entertainment Art Team Leader
- Jo Wang-ki as Joong-hee's acting teacher
- Choi Dae-hoon as PD Lee
- Park Seo-young as Mathematics teacher of Onjeong high school
- Song Min-ji as Hye-young's friend
- Choi Na-moo as Mi-young's high school alumnus
- So Hee-jung as Yoo-joo's mother
- Park Min-jung as Actress
- Han Choon-il as Real estate owner
- Park Seung-tae as deceased Han-soo's aunt
- Jun Hyun-tae as Community center's chief
- Hong Yi-joo as Community center's Yoga Instructor 1
- Jun Hye-young as Community center's Yoga Instructor 2
- Yoo Il-han as Community center's Yoga Instructor 3
- Kim Bo-neui as Gabi Entertainment Art Team Staff
- Lee Seung-joon as Reporter Kim Geun-soo
- Sung Chan-ho as Senior corporate executive
- Yeo Un-bok as Pizza House manager
- Choi Young as Central Police Station detective
- Jin Hyun-kwang as Attorney Lee Chan-soo
- Lee Jae-uk as Do Jung-tae
- Son Dong-hwa as Lee Shi-hoon
- Kim Jong-ho as Photographer
- In Sung-ho
- Son Joo-won
- Jung Han-jin
- Ham Jin-sung
- Lee Hyun-joo
- Seo Kwang-jae
- Lee Eun-sung
- Kim Tae-rang
- Min Joon-hyun
- Lee Tae-gum
- Gong Yoon-chan
- Lee Seo-hwan
- Park Min-jung
- Kim Min-kyung
- Choi In-sook
- Kim Do-kyum

=== Special appearances ===
- Kim Jung-young as Yoon-seok's mother
- Jo Woo-jong as Love and Battlefield host
- Kwon Jae-kwang as 2 Day 1 NightTogether Director
- Kim Jung-ha
- Seo Yoon-ah as Hyun-ji — Ahn Joong-hee's ex-girlfriend
- Hak-jin as Yeon Tae-soo — Byun Ra-young's ex-boyfriend
- Kim Chan-mi as Drama Staff
- Lee Na-eun as Drama Staff
- Uhm Ji-in
- Sung Hyuk as Moon Ji-sang

== Original soundtrack ==
My Father Is Strange OST

Soundtrack album by Various artists
- Released: 2017
- Genre: Soundtrack
- Languages: Korean, English
- Labels: iHQ; Gazi Contents; LOEN Entertainment

=== Part 1 ===
No.	Title	Lyrics	Music	Artist	Length
1.	"It's You" (그게 너라고)	Gaemi; Yoda	Kim Se-jin; Lohi	Na Yoon-kwon, Da-eun	03:41
2.	"It's You" (Inst.)		Kim Se-jin; Lohi		03:41
Total length:					07:22

=== Part 2 ===
No.	Title	Lyrics	Music	Artist	Length
1.	"Love Song"	Gaemi	Gaemi; Heo Sung-jin	Nam Joo	02:42
2.	"Love Song" (Inst.)		Gaemi; Heo Sung-jin		02:42
Total length:					05:24

=== Part 3 ===
No.	Title	Lyrics	Music	Artist	Length
1.	"My Heart"	Gaemi	Gaemi; Park Chan; Kim Se-jin	Kim Hyung-joong	03:52
2.	"My Heart" (Inst.)		Gaemi; Park Chan; Kim Se-jin		03:51
Total length:					07:43

=== Part 4 ===
No.	Title	Lyrics	Music	Artist	Length
1.	"Kongdak Kongdak (Acoustic Ver.)" (콩닥콩닥)	Lee Chang-gun	Lee Chang-gun	Sugar Bubble Acoustic	04:00
2.	"Kongdak Kongdak (Acoustic Ver.)" (Inst.)		Lee Chang-gun		04:00
Total length:					08:00

== Ratings ==
- In this table, The blue numbers represent the lowest ratings and the red numbers represent the highest ratings.
- NR denotes that the drama did not rank in the top 20 daily programs on that date.

Ep.	Broadcast date	Average audience share			
Ep.	Broadcast date	TNmS		AGB Nielsen	
Ep.	Broadcast date	Nationwide	Seoul	Nationwide	Seoul
1	March 4, 2017	21.1% (1st)	19.4% (1st)	22.9% (1st)	22.7% (1st)
2	March 5, 2017	24.4% (1st)	23.3% (1st)	26.5% (1st)	25.7% (1st)
3	March 11, 2017	19.6% (1st)	18.8% (1st)	21.4% (1st)	20.7% (1st)
4	March 12, 2017	21.9% (1st)	21.1% (1st)	24.4% (1st)	24.5% (1st)
5	March 18, 2017	21.1% (1st)	20.7% (1st)	22.5% (1st)	21.4% (1st)
6	March 19, 2017	26.2% (1st)	23.5% (1st)	27.1% (1st)	26.3% (1st)
7	March 25, 2017	22.6% (1st)	21.0% (1st)	22.4% (1st)	21.6% (1st)
8	March 26, 2017	26.9% (1st)	25.1% (1st)	26.8% (1st)	25.6% (1st)
9	April 1, 2017	23.5% (1st)	19.8% (2nd)	21.9% (1st)	
10	April 2, 2017	26.4% (1st)	24.6% (1st)	25.8% (1st)	25.5% (1st)
11	April 8, 2017	22.0% (1st)	19.6% (2nd)	22.3% (1st)	22.4% (1st)
12	April 9, 2017	25.5% (1st)	23.3% (1st)	26.8% (1st)	25.9% (1st)
13	April 15, 2017	22.9% (1st)	20.7% (1st)	22.8% (1st)	22.4% (1st)
14	April 16, 2017	27.6% (1st)	25.5% (1st)	28.0% (1st)	27.6% (1st)
15	April 22, 2017	24.7% (1st)	22.5% (1st)	23.0% (1st)	22.4% (1st)
16	April 23, 2017	24.4% (1st)	22.8% (1st)	23.5% (1st)	23.4% (1st)
17	April 29, 2017	24.4% (1st)	23.1% (1st)	24.2% (1st)	23.9% (1st)
18	April 30, 2017	28.2% (1st)	26.5% (1st)	27.1% (1st)	26.7% (1st)
19	May 6, 2017	25.7% (1st)	25.1% (1st)	25.2% (1st)	24.4% (1st)
20	May 7, 2017	28.8% (1st)	27.1% (1st)	29.2% (1st)	28.4% (1st)
21	May 13, 2017	24.7% (1st)	25.3% (1st)	26.1% (1st)	25.6% (1st)
22	May 14, 2017	27.9% (1st)	27.7% (1st)	30.4% (1st)	29.2% (1st)
23	May 20, 2017	24.7% (1st)	22.6% (1st)	24.0% (1st)	23.0% (1st)
24	May 21, 2017	30.2% (1st)	28.6% (1st)	30.5% (1st)	29.3% (1st)
25	May 27, 2017	25.1% (1st)	23.5% (1st)	24.2% (1st)	23.8% (1st)
26	May 28, 2017	30.5% (1st)	29.7% (1st)	31.0% (1st)	31.1% (1st)
27	June 3, 2017	25.6% (1st)	24.1% (1st)	26.4% (1st)	25.1% (1st)
28	June 4, 2017	28.7% (1st)	27.6% (1st)	31.0% (1st)	30.7% (1st)
29	June 10, 2017	27.3% (1st)	25.6% (1st)	26.1% (1st)	25.1% (1st)
30	June 11, 2017	29.9% (1st)	27.9% (1st)	31.7% (1st)	30.9% (1st)
31	June 17, 2017	25.8% (1st)	23.6% (1st)	26.5% (1st)	25.2% (1st)
32	June 18, 2017	30.5% (1st)	28.1% (1st)	31.6% (1st)	31.1% (1st)
33	June 24, 2017	27.1% (1st)	25.1% (1st)	27.4% (1st)	27.5% (1st)
34	June 25, 2017	29.7% (1st)	28.6% (1st)	31.4% (1st)	31.2% (1st)
35	July 1, 2017	27.0% (1st)	25.1% (1st)	28.8% (1st)	28.7% (1st)
36	July 2, 2017	31.7% (1st)	29.8% (1st)	33.2% (1st)	33.0% (1st)
37	July 8, 2017	28.8% (1st)	26.7% (1st)	28.8% (1st)	28.8% (1st)
38	July 9, 2017	31.9% (1st)	29.7% (1st)	32.5% (1st)	32.4% (1st)
39	July 15, 2017	28.1% (1st)	26.3% (1st)	28.7% (1st)	29.0% (1st)
40	July 16, 2017	31.5% (1st)	29.7% (1st)	33.4% (1st)	33.1% (1st)
41	July 22, 2017	28.1% (1st)	25.3% (1st)	27.0% (1st)	26.9% (1st)
42	July 23, 2017	32.7% (1st)	30.2% (1st)	32.1% (1st)	32.3% (1st)
43	July 29, 2017	24.1% (1st)	27.8% (1st)	28.0% (1st)	28.2% (1st)
44	July 30, 2017	32.4% (1st)	28.4% (1st)	31.0% (1st)	31.2% (1st)
45	August 5, 2017	27.1% (1st)	23.8% (1st)	28.3% (1st)	28.4% (1st)
46	August 6, 2017	32.3% (1st)	28.8% (1st)	32.2% (1st)	32.4% (1st)
47	August 12, 2017	27.8% (1st)	24.4% (1st)	27.9% (1st)	27.2% (1st)
48	August 13, 2017	32.6% (1st)	30.3% (1st)	34.1% (1st)	34.4% (1st)
49	August 19, 2017	27.7% (1st)	25.2% (1st)	30.3% (1st)	30.1% (1st)
50	August 20, 2017	34.1% (1st)	31.2% (1st)	36.5% (1st)	36.3% (1st)
51	August 26, 2017	29.2% (1st)	25.6% (1st)	28.6% (1st)	28.2% (1st)
52	August 27, 2017	33.1% (1st)	30.3% (1st)	33.7% (1st)	33.3% (1st)
Average		27.2%	25.4%	27.8%	27.4%

== Awards and nominations ==
Year	Award	Category	Recipient	Result	Ref.
2017	10th Korea Drama Awards	Grand Prize (Daesang)	Kim Yeong-cheol	Nominated	
2017	10th Korea Drama Awards	Excellence Award, Actor	Min Jin-woong	Won	
2017	1st The Seoul Awards	Best Supporting Actress	Jung So-min	Nominated	
2017	31st KBS Drama Awards	Grand Prize (Daesang)	Kim Yeong-cheol	Won	
2017	31st KBS Drama Awards	Top Excellence Award, Actor	Kim Yeong-cheol	Nominated	
2017	31st KBS Drama Awards	Top Excellence Award, Actress	Lee Yoo-ri	Won	
2017	31st KBS Drama Awards	Top Excellence Award, Actress	Kim Hae-sook	Nominated	
2017	31st KBS Drama Awards	Excellence Award, Actor in a Serial Drama	Kim Yeong-cheol	Nominated	
2017	31st KBS Drama Awards	Excellence Award, Actor in a Serial Drama	Lee Joon	Nominated	
2017	31st KBS Drama Awards	Excellence Award, Actor in a Serial Drama	Ryu Soo-young	Nominated	
2017	31st KBS Drama Awards	Excellence Award, Actress in a Serial Drama	Jung So-min	Nominated	
2017	31st KBS Drama Awards	Excellence Award, Actress in a Serial Drama	Kim Hae-sook	Nominated	
2017	31st KBS Drama Awards	Excellence Award, Actress in a Serial Drama	Lee Yoo-ri	Nominated	
2017	31st KBS Drama Awards	Best Supporting Actress	Lee Mi-do	Nominated	
2017	31st KBS Drama Awards	Best New Actress	Ryu Hwa-young	Won	
2017	31st KBS Drama Awards	Best Young Actor	Jung Joon-won	Won	
2017	31st KBS Drama Awards	Netizen Award – Female	Lee Yoo-ri	Nominated	
2017	31st KBS Drama Awards	Netizen Award – Female	Jung So-min	Nominated	
2017	31st KBS Drama Awards	Best Couple Award	Ryu Soo-young & Lee Yoo-ri	Won	

== Adaptation ==
In 2024, Disney+ Hotstar announced that it would create an Indian Tamil-language adaptation of the series. The remake titled Uppu Puli Kaaram is directed by M. Ramesh Baarathi and stars Ponvannan, Vanitha Krishnachandran, Naveen Muralidhar, Ayesha Zeenath, Ashwini Aanandita, Deepika Venkatachalam, Krishna Raghunandhan, Farina Azad, Raj Ayyappa and Pranav Mohan. This series eventually gained more popularity among its audience as well.
