= Ryu Hwa-young =

South Korean singer and actress (born 1993)

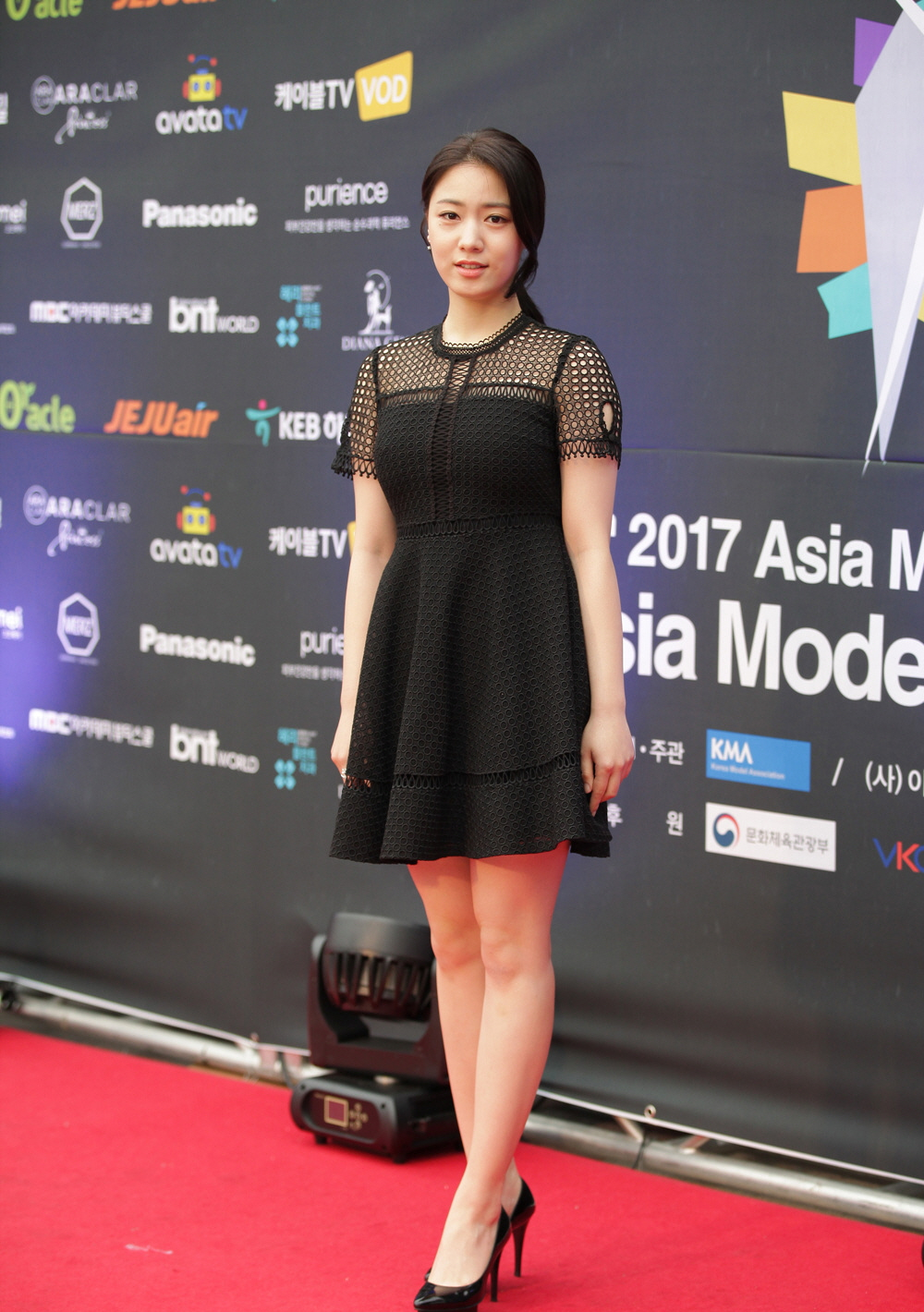
- Ryu in June 2017
- Born: April 22, 1993 (age 33); Gwangju, South Korea
- Occupations: Actress; singer
- Years active: 2014–present
- Agent: Never Die Entertainment
- Spouse: Unknown (m. 2026)
- Relatives: Ryu Hyo-young (twin sister)
- Musical career
- Genre: K-pop
- Instrument: Vocals
- Years active: 2010–2012
- Label: Core Contents
- Formerly of: T-ara

Korean name
- Hangul: 류화영
- Hanja: 柳和榮
- RR: Ryu Hwayeong
- MR: Ryu Hwayŏng

Signature
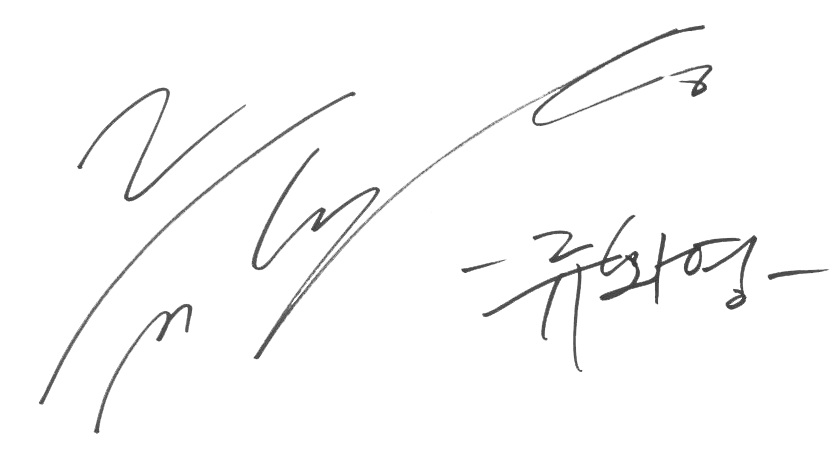

Ryu Hwa-young (Korean: 류화영; born April 22, 1993), better known by the mononym Hwayoung, is a South Korean actress and singer. She is a former member of South Korean girl group T-ara.

== Biography ==
Ryu Hwa-young was born on April 22, 1993, in Gwangju, South Korea. Her older twin sister is Ryu Hyo-young.

Ryu Hyo-young and Ryu Hwa-young made a guest appearance on SBS's variety show Star King in May 2010. They were both subsequently scouted and recruited by Core Contents Media.

== Career ==
=== 2010–2012: T-ara and solo activities ===
In July 2010, it was announced that Ryu Hwa-young would be added into T-ara as lead rapper while her sister would be debuting in the newly formed Coed School. She began promotions as part of T-ara in November 2010 by appearing on the third season of Hello Baby and promoting their first mini album Temptastic. T-ara held their first performance with Ryu on December 3, through KBS's Music Bank. During her time in the group, she participated in the collaboration between Davichi and T-ara for "We Were In Love" (Korean: 우리 사랑했잖아) in December 2011. She also participated in the writing of the rap lyrics of "Love is All the Same" (Korean: 사랑은 다 그런거래요) by fellow labelmate Yangpa.

On July 30, 2012, it was revealed Ryu would no longer be a member of T-ara. Despite rumours of a possible return to T-ara, Ryu announced that she would be returning to the music industry with a new image. On September 10, Ryu later participated in the hip-hop and rap event "Open Freestyle Day 2012", announcing that she was looking forward to studying music and eventually returning to the industry.

=== 2014–present: Acting career ===
On December 15, it was announced that Ryu signed an exclusive contract with Wellmade Yedang and was preparing to debut as an actress. On December 31, Ryu made an appearance at the "2014 Miller Countdown Party" as a DJ, alongside DJ Koo, Park Myung-soo and TATA, becoming the youngest female DJ to ever participate in the event.

Ryu debuted as an actress in the two-episode drama special Mother's Choice. She successfully made a transition into acting after receiving praise for her roles in tvN's romantic comedy Ex-Girlfriends' Club and JTBC's coming-of-age drama Hello, My Twenties!. In 2017, she was a part of the ensemble cast for weekend drama My Father is Strange. She was then cast in her first leading role in KBS's crime drama Mad Dog.

On June 24, 2020, it was announced that Ryu signed a new contract with Polaris Entertainment. Later on September 13, 2021, Ryu terminated her contract with Polaris Entertainment.

In November 2020, she was revealed to be on the variety show King of Masked Singer, her first singing activity since she was fired from T-ara. This led to immediate global backlash due to her past bullying controversies regarding T-ara.

On December 9, 2021, Ryu signed a contract with Never Die Entertainment.

== Controversies ==
=== Inkigayo wardrobe malfunction scandal ===
A wardrobe malfunction occurred during the January 29, 2012 episode of Inkigayo in which Ryu Hwa-young accidentally exposed her breast during her dance solo. A screencap made its rounds online through Korean media portals and SNS services. JoongAng Ilbo said that the show was airing live when the incident occurred. Core Contents Media issued an official statement about the incident: "T-ara's stage was done completely live, and it was a live broadcast accident. There weren't any problems during their rehearsal [...]. Before the fact that she's a celebrity, she's still a minor, so we hope that people will remember that she's a young girl." SBS issued an apology statement.

=== Bullying and legal issues ===
On July 28, 2012, several members of T-ara posted tweets that were purportedly seen to be derisive references to Ryu. An official announcement regarding these tweets and a "major announcement about T-ara" was made July 30, which revealed Ryu would no longer be a member of the group. Following the announcement of her abrupt contract termination with Core Contents Media, rumors of her experiencing severe bullying by other members of T-ara surfaced throughout the web and the media, which sparked intensive public interest and controversy. Some members of the public strongly believed that Ryu was mistreated by the other members of T-ara and her agency, and an outcry by T-ara's fan community led to the scheduling of a shut down, as well as the suspension of the members' activities, resulting in a huge blow to the group's popularity.

In 2017, a former T-ara staff member claimed that Ryu and her sister Ryu Hyo-young were the actual bullies in the scandal that plagued T-ara in 2012. Soon afterwards, more staffers came forwards with accounts that Ryu had been disrespectful to the other members as well as stylists, and claimed she had faked how severe an injury was in order to get more sympathy. Ryu initially denied the rumors, but later admitted parts were true. Following intense backlash, including a flood of negative messages on her social media and a reduction of her role in Hello, My Twenties! 2 to a cameo, Ryu temporarily deleted her Instagram account.

In 2024, former agency chief Kim Kwang-soo reignited the controversy and remarked: "T-ara members did nothing wrong." In response, Ryu countered that she was indeed subjected to physical and verbal abuse, had evidence to support her claims, but kept silent so she and her twin sister could be released from the agency contracts.

== Personal life ==
On September 12, 2026, Ryu married a non-celebrity businessman in Seoul.

== Filmography ==
=== Film ===
Year	Title	Role	Ref.
2015	Love Forecast	Hee-jin	
2022	Interesting Sound	Eun-su	

=== Television series ===
Year	Title	Role	Notes	Ref.
2014	A Mother's Choice	Seo Hyun-ah		
2015	Ok's Family	Han Ok		
2015	Ex-Girlfriends' Club	Rara (Goo Geun-hyung)		
2016	Come Back Mister	Wang Joo-yeon		
2016	Descendants of the Sun	Seo Dae-young's ex-girlfriend	Cameo (Episode 4)	
2016	KBS Drama Special: "Disqualified Laughter"	Shin Na-ra		
2016-17	Hello, My Twenties!	Kang Yi-na	Main (season 1); Guest (season 2)	
2017	My Father Is Strange	Byun Ra-young		
2017	Traces of Hand	Jung Min-young		
2017	Girl's War	Jina		
2017	Fortuneteller's Secret Recipe	Na Rae		
2017	Mad Dog	Jang Ha-ri		
2018	The Beauty Inside	Chae Yoo-ri	Special appearance	
2021	Love Scene Number	Yoon Ban-ya	Episode: "Love Scene #35"	

=== Variety show ===
Year	Title	Role	Notes	Ref.
2020	King of Mask Singer	Contestant	as "Oriental Stork" (Episode 279)	

== Awards and nominations ==
Year	Award	Category	Nominated work	Result	Ref.
2017	31st KBS Drama Award	Best New Actress	My Father is Strange and Mad Dog	Won	
2017	31st KBS Drama Award	Best Couple Award (with Woo Do-hwan)	Mad Dog	Nominated	
2022	New York True Venture Film Festival	Best Actress	Exist Within	Won	
