= Lee Mi-do =

South Korean actress (born 1982)

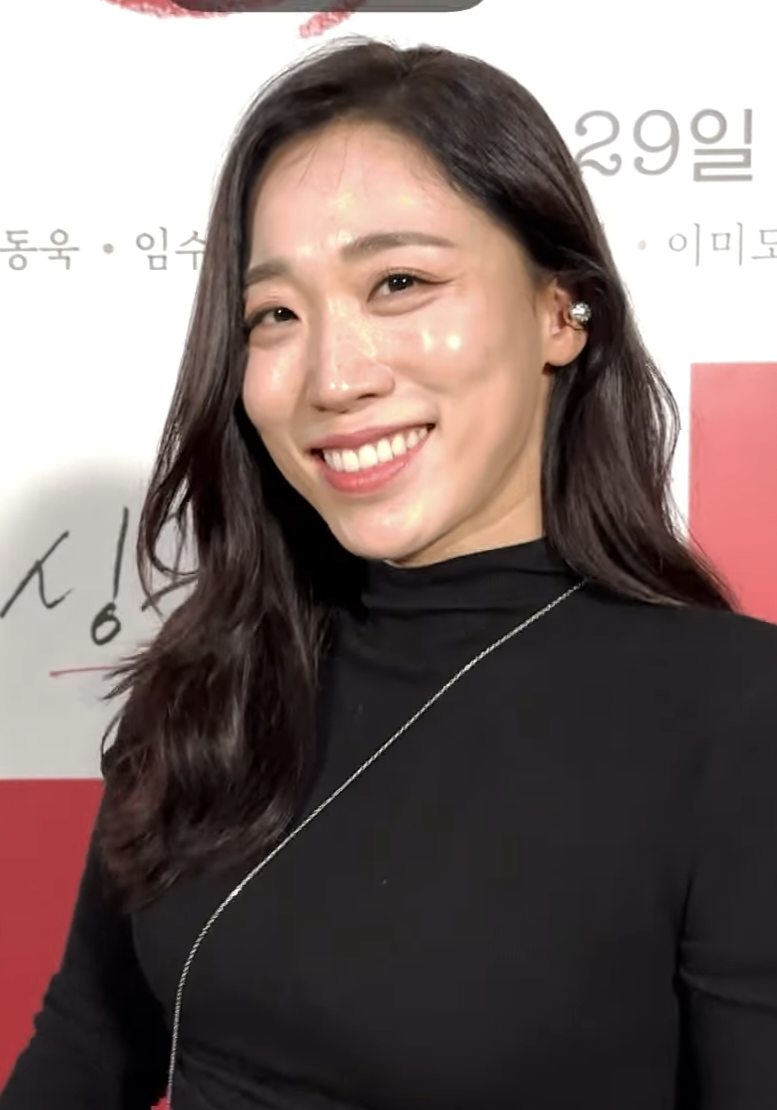
- Lee in November 2023
- Born: 25 May 1982 (age 44); Gwangju, South Korea
- Education: Hanyang University – Dept. of Theatre and Film
- Occupation: Actress
- Agent(s): J,Wide-Company
- Spouse: Lee Sang-joon (m. 2016)
- Children: 1

Korean name
- Hangul: 이미도
- RR: I Mido
- MR: I Mido

Birth name
- Hangul: 이은혜
- RR: I Eunhye
- MR: I Ŭnhye

Lee Mi-do (Korean: 이미도; born 25 May 1982), birth name Lee Eun-hye, is a South Korean actress.

== Career ==
In 2012, she started working in TV, while remaining active in the world of movies. Her notable TV credits include The Queen of Office (2013) and You Are My Destiny (2014).

In 2015, she got an award at the 1st Scene Stealer Festival as one of the 22 Scene Stealers of the Year in recognition of her outstanding work in acting.

== Personal life ==
Lee married a non-celebrity in 2016 and had a son in 2018.

== Filmography ==
=== Film ===
Year	Title	Role
2004	Flying Boys	Problematic student
2005	Another Public Enemy	
2005	Marrying the Mafia II	Waitress
2006	A Millionaire's First Love	
2006	Hanbando	
2007	Herb	Perilla leaf 3
2007	Skeletons in the Closet	
2008	Forever the Moment	Hyeon-ja
2009	Why Did You Come to My House?	Fun
2009	Mother	Student Hyung-teo
2009	The Code of a Duel	Secretary 2
2009	Paju	Human rights organization manager
2009	Jeon Woo-chi: The Taoist Wizard	Palace girl 2
2010	Attack the Gas Station 2	Lee Mi-do
2010	Secret Love	Nurse Park
2010	Happy Killers	Jjookkoomi
2010	A Long Visit	Screenwriter Lee
2010	Cyrano Agency	So-yun
2010	The Unjust	Lee Dong-seok's wife
2011	Chupachups (short film)	
2011	Little Black Dress	Pre-college girl
2011	Pained	Street vendor
2011	Pitch High	Miss Lee
2011	Spellbound	Yoo-jin
2012	I Am the King	
2012	Ghost Sweepers	Joon-kyung (cameo)
2012	26 Years	Kwak Jin-bae's mother
2013	Queen of the Night	Jeong-tae's mother
2013	Marriage Blue	Eccentric bride (special appearance)
2014	Whistle Blower	Yoon Min-cheol's wife
2014	Red Carpet	Sunny
2015	The Beauty Inside	Hong Eun-soo
2015	Sunshine Love	Sung-hee
2016	Familyhood	Lee Joo-hwa (special appearance)
2017	Daddy You, Daughter Me	Deputy Na Yoon-mi
2020	Night of the Undead	Yang-sun
2022	A Day in Tongyeong	Seong-seon
2023	Single in Seoul	Joo Hyeon-jin's coworker

=== Television series ===
Year	Title	Role
2011	Ojakgyo Family	Nam-sook
2012	21st Century Family	Lee Eun-pyo
2012	Ugly Miss Young-ae 10	Guest (ep. 1)
2012	It Was Love	Kim Mi-jin
2012	KBS Drama Special: "Mellow in May"	
2013	The Queen of Office	Park Bong-hee
2013	The King's Daughter, Soo Baek-hyang	Mak-geum
2013	Marry Him If You Dare	Bae Hyun-ah
2014	You Are My Destiny	Kim Mi-ja
2014	Mr. Back	Son Woo-young
2015	Unkind Ladies	Park Eun-shil
2015	Cheer Up!	Nam Jung-a
2016	Mrs. Cop 2	Bae Soo-min
2016	Sweet Stranger and Me	Lee Mi-sun
2017	My Father Is Strange	Kim Yoo-joo
2018	Hold Me Tight	Yoon Hong-sook
2019	My Lawyer, Mr. Jo 2: Crime and Punishment	Oh Jung-ja
2020	Oh My Baby	Kim Eun-young
2020	18 Again	Choo Ae-rin
2022	Rose Mansion	Sook-ja
2022	Kiss Sixth Sense	Lisa (cameo)
2022	The Fabulous	Hong Ji-seon
2023	The Secret Romantic Guesthouse	Naju
2023	My Dearest	Yang Si
2024	The Judge from Hell	Seo Hwa-seon
2025	Pump Up the Healthy Love	Rosa
2026	The Art of Sarah	Seong-a (cameo)

=== Variety shows ===
Year	Title	Role	Ref.
2019–2020	The Return of Superman	Narrator	
2021	Fireworks Handsome	Host	
2021	Goal Girl	Cast member	

== Awards and nominations ==
Year	Award	Category	Nominated work	Result
2015	1st Scene Stealer Festival	Scene Stealers of the Year	—N/a	Won
2015	KBS Drama Awards	Best Supporting Actress	Unkind Ladies, Cheer Up!	Nominated
2017	KBS Drama Awards	Best Supporting Actress	My Father Is Strange	Nominated
