= Tempted (TV series) =

2018 South Korean television series

- Promotional poster
- Hangul: 위대한 유혹자
- Lit.: The Great Seducer
- RR: Widaehan yuhokja
- MR: Widaehan yuhokcha
- Genre: Romance; Melodrama; Youth
- Based on: Les Liaisons dangereuses by Pierre Choderlos de Laclos
- Developed by: Son Hyung-suk
- Written by: Kim Bo-yeon
- Directed by: Kang In
- Starring: Woo Do-hwan; Park Soo-young; Kim Min-jae; Moon Ka-young
- Country of origin: South Korea
- Original language: Korean
- No. of episodes: 32 (Note: In order to circumvent Korean laws that prevent commercial breaks in the middle of an episode, what would previously have been aired as single 70 minute episodes are now being repackaged as two 35 minute episodes, with two episodes being shown each night with a commercial break between the two.)

Production
- Executive producers: Moon Seok-hwan; Oh Kwang-hee
- Camera setup: Single-camera
- Running time: 35 minutes
- Production company: Bon Factory

Original release
- Network: MBC TV
- Release: March 12 – May 1, 2018

Related
- Untold Scandal; Les Liaisons dangereuses (France); Cruel Intentions (US pilot)

Tempted (Korean: 위대한 유혹자) is a 2018 South Korean television series starring Woo Do-hwan, Park Soo-young, Kim Min-jae, and Moon Ka-young. It is loosely based on the 1782 French novel Les Liaisons dangereuses by Pierre Choderlos de Laclos. The series aired on MBC TV from March 12 to May 1, 2018, every Monday and Tuesday at 22:00 (KST) for 32 episodes.

== Synopsis ==
A romantic melodrama that depicts the lives of a young man and woman who begin to discover their true feelings whilst playing the dangerous game of love. The show is based on the classic 18th-century French novel Les Liaisons Dangereuses by Pierre Choderlos de Laclos.

Student president Choi Su-ji (Moon Ka-young), Kwon Si-hyeon (Woo Do-hwan) eldest heir of the JK Group, and casanova Lee Se-ju (Kim Min-jae) have been best friends since childhood. Su-ji's current boyfriend, Lee Ki-young (Lee Jae-kyun) humiliates her and her mother for trying to use him to climb up the social ladder and breaks up with her. As the last straw, when Su-ji's mother and Si-hyeon's father announce their engagement, the trio devise a plan to hit two birds with one stone.

Eun Tae-hui (Park Soo-young) is a hardworking female college student who no longer believes in love after watching the demise of her parents' marriage. Su-ji finds out that Tae-hui is Ki-young's first love, and asks Si-hyeon to seduce Tae-hui and then break her heart, as a way to prove his loyalty to Su-ji. After proving which, Su-ji and Si-hyeon will marry to prevent their parents from doing so themselves.

However, all does not go as planned, when Si-hyeon and Tae-hui begin to actually fall for each other. The strain this puts on the trio's friendship, Tae-hui's reaction after seeing their true faces and Ki-young's thirst for revenge make up the rest of this drama.

== Cast ==
=== Main ===
- Woo Do-hwan as Kwon Si-hyeon, the sole grandson and heir in the JK Group conglomerate who bets his life in a dangerous game of love. As he tries to seduce Tae-hee he gradually begins to fall for her.
  - Ji Min-hyuk as young Kwon Si-hyeon
- Park Soo-young as Eun Tae-hee, a 20-year-old hardworking college student, who after watching her parents unhappy marriage fall apart, believes that being swayed by love is the most pitiful thing until she meets Si-hyeon.
- Kim Min-jae as Lee Se-ju, a playboy chaebol who is Si-hyeon and Su-ji's best friend and is madly in love with Su-ji but rather has her as his friend as he knows about her feelings towards Si-hyeon.
- Moon Ga-young as Choi Su-ji, the daughter of a hospital director and the initiator of Tae-hee's seduction. She has been Si-hyeon and Se-ju's friend since childhood, but she loves Si-hyeon.
  - Kim Min-ju as young Choi Su-ji

=== Supporting ===
- Shin Sung-woo as Kwon Seok-woo, Si-hyeon's father and Seol Young-won's old love.
- Jeon Mi-seon as Seol Young-won, Tae-hee's mother.
- Kim Seo-hyung as Myung Mi-ri, an ambitious and established doctor. Su-ji's mother. Kwon Seok-woo's fiancé.
- Jeong Ha-dam as Ko Kyung-joo, Tae-hee's best friend.
- Moon Hee-kyung as Oh Se-ri, So-joo's Sister-in-law
- Lee Young-jin as Jung Na-yoon, Kyung-ju's mother
- Tae Hang-ho as Priest Matteo
- Kim Ah-ra as Bing Bing, a maid at Kyung-joo's house.
- Lee Jae-kyun as Lee Gi-young, the spoiled son of a lawyer. His first love is Tae-hee. He still hasn't moved on from Tae hee. He is enemies with the three rich heirs.
- Kim Do-wan as Yoo Joo-hwan, Hye-jung's boyfriend who is a bartender.
- Oh Ha-nee as Park Hye-jung, the daughter of an F&B CEO, and Gi-young's future fiancée.
- Shin Chang-joo as Park Gyu-jeong, Hye-jung's brother.
- Jung Hye-sun as Hong Sook-hee, Shi-hyun's grandmother and president of JK Group family

=== Special appearance ===
- Han Sun-hwa as Ji-young, Si-hyeon's ex-girlfriend who is a lawyer.
- Yeonwoo as Kwon Yeo-min, Si-hyeon's cousin.

== Production ==
- The series is formerly known as Love Game: The Great Seduction (러브게임: 위대한 유혹; reobeugeim: widaehan yuhok).
- Yeo Jin-goo was first offered the male lead role, but declined.
- The first script reading of the cast was held on January 16, 2018 at MBC Station in Sangam-dong.

== Original soundtrack ==
Tempted (The Great Seducer) OST

Soundtrack album by Various artists
- Released: 2018
- Genre: Soundtrack
- Languages: Korean; English
- Labels: Bon Factory Worldwide, kakao M (Note: Formerly LOEN Entertainment until March 23, 2018)
- Producers: Moon Seok-hwan, Oh Kwang-hee

=== Part 1 ===
Released on March 20, 2018
No.	Title	Lyrics	Music	Artist	Length
1.	"Hug Me" (안아줘)	KamDongis, Good Choice	Seo Jae-ha, Kim Young-sung	Momoland (Note: Credited as a song by Momoland, sung by members Taeha, JooE, Ahin and Nancy)	03:40
2.	"Hug Me" (Inst.)		Seo Jae-ha, Kim Young-sung		03:40
Total length:					07:20

=== Part 2 ===
Released on March 27, 2018
No.	Title	Lyrics	Music	Artist	Length
1.	"Nonsense (Note: 1theK's title for this song is "OMG!". For the song, the drama's lead female actress was credited under her stage name.)" (말도 안돼)	Fara Effect	Fara Effect	Joy (Red Velvet)	02:56
2.	"Nonsense" (Inst.)		Fara Effect		02:56
Total length:					05:52

=== Part 3 ===
Released on April 10, 2018
No.	Title	Lyrics	Music	Artist	Length
1.	"Missed Connections (Note: 1theK's title for this song is "Missed Connections". The artist was credited as DK.)" (내가 먼저)	Good Choice, A.Tone, Kim Hyun-seok	A.Tone, Kim Hyun-seok	Dokyeom (Seventeen)	03:56
2.	"Missed Connections" (Inst.)		A.Tone, Kim Hyun-seok		03:56
Total length:					07:52

=== Part 4 ===
Released on April 17, 2018
No.	Title	Lyrics	Music	Artist	Length
1.	"Side (Note: 1theK's title for this song is "With You".)" (곁)	Yoda, Good Choice	Kim Se-jin, Midnight	Yang Da-il	03:40
2.	"Side" (Inst.)		Kim Se-jin, Midnight		03:40
Total length:					07:20

== Reception ==
The series had a mixed reception in South Korea, but was well-received internationally. The drama had an overall Nationwide average audience share of 3.2% according to TNmS and 2.2% according to Nielsen Korea. Internationally, Tempted recorded the highest figure in individual programs since the US-based subscription service Kocowa launched with a peak daily market share of 14.9%, and achieved a rating of 9.3/10 on the global premium licensed streaming site Viki. In South Korea the main criticisms were stated to be the failure of the writer and director to set the genre and script issues. According to the Good Data Corporation survey of TV, Tempted was ranked first place in online video consumption of all dramas airing in South Korea, first in the list of top 10 most talked about dramas, and Park Soo-young and Woo Do-hwan were ranked second and third respectively in the list of top 10 most talked about actors and actresses in South Korea. Despite the question of idol singers in lead roles, Park Soo-young was subsequently praised for her improvement and potential in acting after erasing her idol color as lead actress. Woo Do-hwan was also praised for his ability to express a wide range of emotions in the drama, with the first and second leads commended for inhabiting their characters with the material given.

== Ratings ==
Ep.	Original broadcast date	Average audience share			
Ep.	Original broadcast date	TNmS		Nielsen Korea	
Ep.	Original broadcast date	Nationwide	Seoul	Nationwide	Seoul
1	March 12, 2018	5.2%	5.5%	3.6%	4.0%
2	March 12, 2018	4.8%	5.2%	3.4%	3.8%
3	March 13, 2018	4.8%	5.0%	3.1%	3.3%
4	March 13, 2018	4.8%	5.1%	2.7%	3.1%
5	March 19, 2018	3.9%	4.3%	2.6%	3.0%
6	March 19, 2018	3.8%	4.1%	2.9%	3.2%
7	March 20, 2018	3.9%	4.2%	2.5%	2.7%
8	March 20, 2018	3.5%	3.7%	2.3%	2.5%
9	March 26, 2018	3.1%	3.3%	2.2%	2.4%
10	March 26, 2018	3.8%	4.1%	2.5%	2.8%
11	March 27, 2018	3.5%	3.9%	2.3%	2.7%
12	March 27, 2018	3.9%	4.2%	2.6%	2.9%
13	April 2, 2018	2.6%	2.7%	2.3%	2.4%
14	April 2, 2018	3.1%	3.4%	2.3%	2.6%
15	April 3, 2018	3.3%	3.5%	1.9%	2.1%
16	April 3, 2018	3.3%	3.6%	2.1%	2.4%
17	April 9, 2018	2.6%	2.7%	1.8%	1.9%
18	April 9, 2018	2.4%	2.5%	1.6%	1.8%
19	April 10, 2018	3.8%	4.0%	2.0%	2.2%
20	April 10, 2018	3.2%	3.4%	1.9%	2.1%
21	April 16, 2018	2.5%	2.8%	1.7%	1.9%
22	April 16, 2018	2.5%	2.7%	1.6%	1.8%
23	April 17, 2018	3.1%	3.2%	1.9%	2.0%
24	April 17, 2018	3.1%	3.3%	1.9%	2.1%
25	April 23, 2018	2.6%	2.7%	1.6%	1.8%
26	April 23, 2018	2.7%	2.8%	1.9%	2.0%
27	April 24, 2018	2.4%	2.6%	1.9%	2.1%
28	April 24, 2018	2.2%	2.4%	1.7%	1.9%
29	April 30, 2018	1.5%	1.7%	1.5%	1.6%
30	April 30, 2018	1.7%	1.9%	1.7%	1.8%
31	May 1, 2018	2.6%	2.8%	2.4%	2.7%
32	May 1, 2018	2.3%	2.5%	2.2%	2.4%
Average		3.2%	3.4%	2.2%	2.4%
In the table above, the blue numbers represent the lowest ratings and the red numbers represent the highest ratings.

== Awards and nominations ==
Year	Award	Category	Nominee	Result	Ref.
2018	2018 Brand of the Year Awards	Actress of the Year	Park Soo-young	Nominated	
2018	6th APAN Star Awards	Best New Actor	Kim Min-jae	Nominated	
2018	2nd The Seoul Awards	Popularity Award (Drama Actress Category)	Park Soo-young	Nominated	
2018	2018 MBC Drama Awards	Excellence Award, Actor in a Monday-Tuesday Drama	Woo Do-hwan	Won	
2018	2018 MBC Drama Awards	Excellence Award, Actress in a Monday-Tuesday Drama	Moon Ga-young	Won	
2018	2018 MBC Drama Awards	Excellence Award, Actress in a Monday-Tuesday Drama	Park Soo-young	Nominated	
2018	2018 MBC Drama Awards	Best Supporting Cast in Monday-Tuesday Miniseries	Shin Sung-woo	Nominated	
2018	2018 MBC Drama Awards	Best New Actor	Kim Min-jae	Nominated	
2018	2018 MBC Drama Awards	Best New Actress	Moon Ga-young	Nominated	
2018	2018 MBC Drama Awards	Best New Actress	Park Soo-young	Nominated	
2018	2018 MBC Drama Awards	Frustrator Award	Woo Do-hwan and Park Soo-young	Won	
