= Save Me (South Korean TV series) =

2017 South Korean television series

- Promotional poster
- Also known as: Rescue Me
- Hangul: 구해줘
- RR: Guhaejwo
- MR: Kuhaejwŏ
- Genre: Thriller; Mystery
- Based on: "Out of the world" (세상 밖으로) by Jo Geum-san
- Developed by: Studio Dragon
- Written by: Jung Shin-kyoo (Note: In 2019, starting with the MBC TV drama Item, he started to use the pen name "Jung Yi-do".)
- Directed by: Kim Sung-soo
- Starring: Ok Taec-yeon; Seo Yea-ji; Jo Sung-ha; Woo Do-hwan
- Country of origin: South Korea
- Original language: Korean
- No. of episodes: 16

Production
- Executive producer: Lee Jae-moon
- Camera setup: Single camera
- Running time: 60 minutes
- Production company: Hidden Sequence

Original release
- Network: OCN
- Release: August 5 – September 24, 2017

Save Me (Korean: 구해줘; RR: Guhaejwo) is a 2017 South Korean television series starring Ok Taec-yeon, Seo Yea-ji, Jo Sung-ha, and Woo Do-hwan. Serving as the first television series from Signal producer Lee Jae-moon's company Hidden Sequence, it aired on OCN from August 5 to September 24, 2017, for 16 episodes. This drama series is based on the popular Daum webcomic Out of the World (세상 밖으로) by Jo Geum-san.

== Synopsis ==
Im Sang-mi and her family move from Seoul to the suburb of Muji County, after her father's business fails.

The religious cult Goseonwon has most of the county in its grasp, with a large number of followers. The cult disguises itself as a peaceful church, but dark secrets, torture, violence and murder lurk underneath, with even mischievously darker intentions that deceive their most devoted followers.

Sang-mi's twin brother, Sang-jin, who has had a limp since birth, is mercilessly bullied and assaulted at school. Because he can take such abuse no longer, he commits suicide by jumping off the school building. This tears Sang-mi's family apart. Sang Mi's mother soon loses her sanity, causing Sang Mi's hatred for the religious cult, which she blames for her mother's poor condition.

Taking advantage of their fragile state, the cult's leader lures her parents into Goseonwon. Despite Sang-Mi's repeated objections to something wrong with the cult, her father is fully brainwashed. With him in the clutches of the cult and her mother mentally unstable, Sang-mi is trapped and unable to escape.

Three years later, her classmate Han Sang-hwan, the son of the county chief who is now a law student, and his two friends Jung-hoon and Man-hee have a chance encounter with Sang-mi. She whispers to them, "Save me." Sang-hwan, determined to right the wrongs of his past, grows determined to save her and expose the cult to the county. He is joined by his third friend and convicted criminal, Dong-chul, and both Jung-hoon and Man-hee in his mission, unaware that the cult is just the tip of the iceberg. Using their abilities, the characters try to outwit each other in the tug of war over Sang-mi.

== Cast ==
=== Main ===
- Ok Taec-yeon as Han Sang-hwan

The only son of a corrupt politician, who tries to save Sang-mi from the cult. Having power and wealth, he uses it to break into the cult but finds a darker secret lurking inside it.

- Seo Yea-ji as Im Sang-mi

A new girl whose family moved from Seoul to Daegu after her father's business went bankrupt. Her twin brother Sang-jin committed suicide, and the incident caused her mother to go crazy. Her father started to get deeply involved in a cult as he was obscured by the vision of getting his family on the Boat of Salvation to reunite with his deceased son. She desperately tried to escape the hell for three years, until she met again with Han Sang-hwan and his gang, silently pleading for him to save her.

- Jo Sung-ha as Baek Jung-ki

The charismatic leader of the cult, whose kind demeanor and caring attitude are shadowed by violent and manipulative behavior. He is called the Spiritual Father.

- Woo Do-hwan as Suk Dong-chul

The friend of Sang-hwan, who has the most fighting skills out of the whole group. He was incarcerated for three years after Sang-hwan refused to testify for an accident he was involved in, and their relationship had become strained since ever. However, after his release from jail, he decided to mend their relationship and started to work together to save Sang-mi. He breaks into the cult to save Sang-mi, disguised as the son of a rich businessman.

=== Supporting ===
==== Hillbilly Quartet ====
- Lee David as Woo Jung-hoon

The best friend of Sang-hwan and Dong-chul, who's in debt and becomes a streamer.

- Ha Hwa-jung as Choi Man-hee

The smart friend of Sang-hwan and Dong-chul, who is soft and caring. He helps them out multiple times using his deductive abilities and selfless nature.

==== Sang-mi's family ====
- Jung Hae-Gyoon as Im Joo-ho

Sang-mi's father. After the demise of his son, he joined the cult as he strongly believed that his family would be reunited on the Ship of Salvation.

- Yoon Yoo-sun as Kim Bo-eun,

Sang-mi's mother. She became mentally unstable after Sang-jin's death and was locked in a sanitarium owned by the cult. She was used as a tool to threaten Sang-mi to give up on her attempt to escape.

- Jang Yoo-sang as Im Sang-jin

Sang-mi's twin brother, who had been limping since his birth. He suffered from depression and anxiety as a result of being bullied by his friends due to his disability. He eventually decided to commit suicide by jumping off the roof of their school.

==== People at Goosunwon ====
- Park Ji-young as Kang Eun-shil

A member of Goosunwon who stays loyal to Jung-ki, but secretly vies to take control of Goonsunwon.

- Jo Jae-yoon as Jo Wan-tae

The second in command at Goosunwon, who is extremely loyal to Jung-ki and takes advantage of the rich.

- Son Sang-kyung as Jo Wan-deok

The burly bodyguard of Jung-ki and Wan-tae's brother, whose obese stature gives him immense strength.

==== People in Muji ====
- Son Byung-ho as Han Yong-min

The father of Sang-hwan and the governor of Muji. He's corrupt and uses the cult as an advantage point to stay in power.

- Choi Moon-soo as Chae Min-hwa

Mother of Sang-hwan.

- Jang Hyuk-jin as Lee Kang-soo

A gang member and former cop.

- Kim Kwang-kyu as Woo Choon-kil

A cop who has ties with the cult and later joins it.

- Ko Jun as Cha Joon-goo

A thug without a gang, who gets involved in the cult and later rises to the ranks of "Holy Gatekeeper", alongside Dong-chul.

- Kang Kyung-hun as Lee Ji-hee

The aide of Han Yong-min, with whom she has an affair.

- Choi Hyuk-joo as Madame Tudari

Secretary of Jang-ki.

- Park Soo-yeon as Choi Kyung-hye

Woo Choon-kil's cop partner, who wants to save people but is unable to do so.

- Jeon Yeo-been as Hong So-rin

An undercover journalist in Guweonson, later becoming the right-hand of Sang-mi.

- Lee Jae-joon as Dae-shik

Son of a cult member, member of a gang and co-worker of Dong-chul.

- Yoon Jong-suk as Lee Byung-suk

==== Extended ====
- Lee Joon-gyu as Chil-goo
- Jung Jae-kwang as Lee Eun-sung
- Lee In-cheol as Elderly Man
- Hong Sung-deok as Dong-chul's father
- Son Young-soon as Dong-chul's grandmother
- Jung Joon-won as Jung-goo
- Kim Jung-pal as Lee Byung-seok's father
- Min Kyung-ok as Jung-goo's grandmother
- Ahn Min-young as Devotee
- Noh Eun-jung as Devotee
- Jong Seok as Iljin 1
- Lee Seung-hyub as Iljin 2
- Jang Won as Iljin 3
- Nam Hyun-jung as Iljin 4
- Jung Kang-hee as Gochujang
- Son Byung-wook as Pil-soo
- Yoo Yeon as Homeroom teacher
- Kim Ha-yeon as Devotee
- Kim Jin-hee as Devotee
- Im Ho-joon as Devotee
- Jwa Chae-won as Devotee
- Kim Doo-eun as Devotee
- Lee Seol-goo as Shaman
- Lee Tae-hyung as Lee Jin-seok
- Jung Jae-kwang as Eun-sung
- Cha Joon as Bu-jjang
- Lee Jung-heon as Police Chief
- Kim Seo-hwi as Yu-ra, Eun-shil's daughter
- Park Jung-min as Section Chief Park
- Jung Ki-seob as Senior Reporter
- Jang Se-ah as Hospital Nurse
- Kim Se-on as Hwa-ran
- Han Tae-il
- Kook Ji-yong
- Ahn Se-ho
- Kwon Oh-jin
- Jung Myung-joon

=== Special appearances ===
- Jung Hee-tae as homeless man
- Son Jong-hak as Cheon Jae-soon

== Second season ==
OCN confirmed that Save Me would return for a second season, this time based on the 2013 animated film The Fake. Save Me 2 premiered on May 8, 2019.

== Original soundtrack ==
Save Me OST Album

Soundtrack album by Various artists
- Released: 2017
- Genre: Soundtrack
- Language: Korean
- Labels: Studio Curiosity, Vlending Co., Ltd.

=== Part 1 ===
No.	Title	Lyrics	Music	Artist	Length
1.	"I Am (잉키)"	Seo Dong-sung	Park Sung-il (Copykumo)	Inkii	03:58
2.	"I Am (잉키)" (Inst.)		Park Sung-il (Copykumo)		03:58
Total length:					07:56

=== Part 2 ===
No.	Title	Lyrics	Music	Artist	Length
1.	"Hallucination (환각)"	Lee Chi-hoon	Kim Jong-ik	The Vane	04:06
2.	"Hallucination (환각)" (Inst.)		Kim Jong-ik		04:06
Total length:					08:12

=== Part 3 ===
No.	Title	Lyrics	Music	Artist	Length
1.	"Dust Wind (모래바람)"	Jung Cha-sik	Jung Cha-sik	Jung Cha-sik	05:09
2.	"Dust Wind (모래바람)" (Inst.)		Jung Cha-sik		05:09
Total length:					10:18

== Ratings ==
- In this table, the blue numbers represent the lowest ratings and the red numbers represent the highest ratings.
- N/A denotes that the rating is not known.

Ep.	Original broadcast date	Average audience share		
Ep.	Original broadcast date	AGB Nielsen		TNmS
Ep.	Original broadcast date	Nationwide	Seoul	Nationwide
1	August 5, 2017	1.059%	—N/a	1.8%
2	August 6, 2017	1.741%	1.690%	1.4%
3	August 12, 2017	1.284%	—N/a	1.2%
4	August 13, 2017	1.689%	1.805%	1.8%
5	August 19, 2017	1.779%	1.904%	1.1%
6	August 20, 2017	2.275%	2.525%	1.7%
7	August 26, 2017	2.251%	2.802%	1.6%
8	August 27, 2017	2.960%	3.286%	2.4%
9	September 2, 2017	2.433%	2.730%	1.4%
10	September 3, 2017	3.028%	3.192%	1.7%
11	September 9, 2017	2.646%	2.966%	2.2%
12	September 10, 2017	2.879%	2.940%	2.9%
13	September 16, 2017	2.549%	2.897%	2.0%
14	September 17, 2017	3.001%	2.825%	2.8%
15	September 23, 2017	3.244%	3.846%	2.5%
16	September 24, 2017	4.797%	4.639%	4.5%
Average		2.476%	2.861%	2.1%

- This drama airs on a cable channel/pay TV, which normally has a relatively smaller audience compared to free-to-air TV/public broadcasters (KBS, SBS, MBC and EBS).

== Awards and nominations ==
Year	Award	Category	Recipient	Result	Ref.
2018	54th Baeksang Arts Awards	Best New Actor	Woo Do-hwan	Nominated	
