= Woo Do-hwan =

South Korean actor (born 1992)

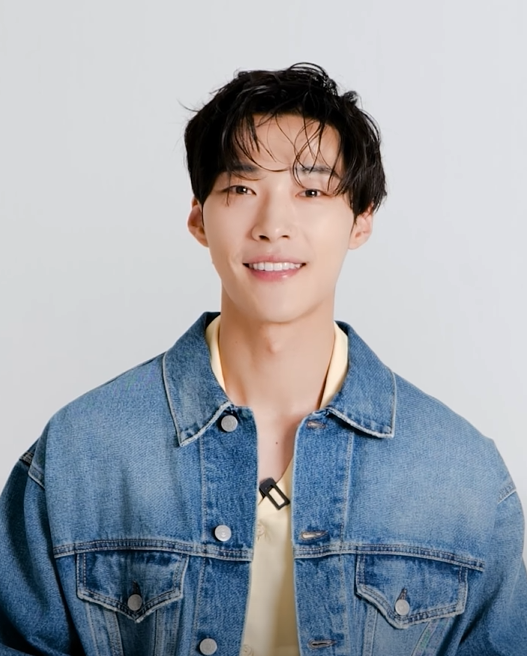
- Woo in March 2023
- Born: July 12, 1992 (age 34); Anyang, Gyeonggi, South Korea
- Education: Dankook University – Department of Performing Arts
- Occupation: Actor
- Years active: 2011–present
- Agent: Blitzway Entertainment

Korean name
- Hangul: 우도환
- Hanja: 禹棹煥
- RR: U Dohwan
- MR: U Tohwan

Woo Do-hwan (Korean: 우도환; born July 12, 1992) is a South Korean actor. He is best known for his roles in the television dramas Save Me (2017), Mad Dog (2017), Tempted (2018), My Country: The New Age (2019), The King: Eternal Monarch (2020), Bloodhounds (2023) and Mr. Plankton (2024). He also appeared in the film The Divine Fury (2019).

== Early life and education ==
Woo was born on July 12, 1992, in Anyang, Gyeonggi Province. He graduated from Dankook University, majoring in performance and film.

== Personal life ==
=== Military service ===
Woo began his mandatory military service on July 6, 2020. By attending six weeks of training as a company commander intern in the recruit training course, he graduated as a student leader at the 21st Department of Transportation Training. Woo was discharged from military service on January 5, 2022, not returning to the unit after his final vacation in accordance with the rules of the Ministry of Defense of the Republic of Korea.

== Filmography ==
=== Film ===
Year	Title	Role	Notes	Ref.
2016	Operation Chromite	Ri Kyung-shik's subordinate	Bit part	
2016	Master	Man with baseball cap		
2019	The Divine Fury	Ji Shin		
2019	The Divine Move 2: The Wrathful	Loner		
2023	My Heart Puppy	Husband of the first interviewee	Cameo	
TBA	Tropical Night	Tae-gang		

=== Television series ===
Year	Title	Role	Notes	Ref.
2011	You're Here, You're Here, You're Really Here		Bit part	
2012	Flower Band		Bit part	
2016	Sweet Stranger and Me	Kim Wan-shik		
2017	Save Me	Seok Dong-cheol		
2017	Mad Dog	Kim Min-joon (Jan Gebauer)		
2018	Tempted	Kwon Si-hyeon		
2019	My Country: The New Age	Nam Seon-ho		
2020	The King: Eternal Monarch	Jo Eun-seob / Jo Yeong		
2023	Poong, the Joseon Psychiatrist	Baek Gwang-hyun	Cameo (season 2)	
2023	Joseon Attorney	Kang Han-soo		
2023–present	Bloodhounds	Kim Geon-woo		
2024	Mr. Plankton	Hae-jo / Chae Seung-hyeok		
2025–2026	Made in Korea	Baek Ki-hyeon		
TBA	Knock-Off	Lee Min-seok		

=== Web series ===
Year	Title	Role	Notes	Ref.
2016	Dramaworld	Seung-woo	Cameo	

== Awards and nominations ==
Name of the award ceremony, year presented, category, nominee of the award, and the result of the nomination
Award ceremony	Year	Category	Nominee / Work	Result	Ref.
APAN Star Awards	2018	Best New Actor	Mad Dog	Nominated	
APAN Star Awards	2021	Best Supporting Actor	The King: Eternal Monarch	Nominated	
Asia Artist Awards	2020	Popularity Award (Actor)	Woo Do-hwan	Nominated	
Asia Top Awards	2023	Best Actor Of The Year	Joseon Attorney	Won	
Asia Top Awards	2024	Best Performance Award	Bloodhounds	Won	
Baeksang Arts Awards	2017	Best New Actor – Film	Master	Nominated	
Baeksang Arts Awards	2018	Best New Actor – Television	Save Me	Nominated	
Blue Dragon Film Awards	2021	Best New Actor	The Divine Move 2: The Wrathful	Nominated	
Chunsa Film Art Awards	2020	Best New Actor	The Divine Fury	Nominated	
Golden Cinema Film Festival	2021	Best New Actor	The Divine Fury	Won	
KBS Drama Awards	2017	Best New Actor	Mad Dog	Won	
KBS Drama Awards	2017	Netizen Award, Actor	Mad Dog	Nominated	
KBS Drama Awards	2017	Best Couple Award	Woo Do-hwan (with Ryu Hwa-young); Mad Dog	Nominated	
MBC Drama Awards	2018	Excellence Award, Actor in a Monday-Tuesday Drama	Tempted	Won	
SBS Drama Awards	2020	Excellence Award, Actor in a Miniseries Fantasy/Romance Drama	The King: Eternal Monarch	Nominated	
The Seoul Awards	2018	Best New Actor (Drama)	Mad Dog	Nominated	
