= 2017 KBS Drama Awards =

31st edition of award ceremony

- Date: December 31, 2017
- Site: KBS Hall, Yeouido, Seoul
- Hosted by: Main: Park Soo-hong; Lee Yoo-ri; Namkoong Min; Special: Heo Kyung-hwan
- Official website: http://www.kbs.co.kr/drama/2017award/

Television coverage
- Network: KBS2, KBS World
- Duration: 260 minutes

The 2017 KBS Drama Awards, presented by Korean Broadcasting System (KBS), was held on December 31, 2017 at KBS Hall in Yeouido, Seoul. It was hosted by Park Soo-hong, Lee Yoo-ri and Namkoong Min.

== Winners and nominees ==
(Winners denoted in bold)

Grand Prize (Daesang)
**Chun Ho-jin** – **My Golden Life**; **Kim Yeong-cheol** – **My Father is Strange**
Top Excellence Award, Actor	Top Excellence Award, Actress
**Namkoong Min** – **Good Manager**; Chun Ho-jin – My Golden Life; Kim Yeong-cheol – My Father is Strange; Kwon Sang-woo – Queen of Mystery; Park Seo-joon – Fight for My Way, Hwarang: The Poet Warrior Youth; Yoo Ji-tae – Mad Dog	**Jung Ryeo-won** – **Witch at Court**; **Lee Yoo-ri** – **My Father is Strange**; Choi Kang-hee – Queen of Mystery; Jang Na-ra – Confession Couple; Kim Hae-sook – My Father is Strange; Kim Ji-won – Fight for My Way; Shin Hye-sun – My Golden Life
Excellence Award, Actor in a Miniseries	Excellence Award, Actress in a Miniseries
**Park Seo-joon** – **Fight for My Way**; Go Kyung-pyo – Strongest Deliveryman; Kwon Sang-woo – Queen of Mystery; Son Ho-jun – Confession Couple; Yoo Ji-tae – Mad Dog; Yoon Hyun-min – Witch at Court	**Jang Na-ra** – **Confession Couple**; **Kim Ji-won** – **Fight for My Way**; Chae Soo-bin – Strongest Deliveryman; Choi Kang-hee – Queen of Mystery; Jung Ryeo-won – Witch at Court
Excellence Award, Actor in a Mid-length Drama	Excellence Award, Actress in a Mid-length Drama
**Lee Dong-gun** – **Queen for Seven Days**; **Lee Jun-ho** – **Good Manager**; Namkoong Min – Good Manager; Park Seo-joon – Hwarang: The Poet Warrior Youth; Yoon Sang-hyun – Ms. Perfect	**Cho Yeo-jeong** – **Ms. Perfect**; Go Ara – Hwarang: The Poet Warrior Youth; Ko So-young – Ms. Perfect; Nam Sang-mi – Good Manager; Park Min-young – Queen for Seven Days
Excellence Award, Actor in a Serial Drama	Excellence Award, Actress in a Serial Drama
**Park Si-hoo** – **My Golden Life**; Chun Ho-jin – My Golden Life; Kim Yeong-cheol – My Father is Strange; Lee Joon – My Father is Strange; Ryu Soo-young – My Father is Strange	**Shin Hye-sun** – **My Golden Life**; Jung So-min – My Father is Strange; Kim Hae-sook – My Father is Strange; Kim Hye-ok – My Golden Life; Lee Yoo-ri – My Father is Strange
Excellence Award, Actor in a Daily Drama	Excellence Award, Actress in a Daily Drama
**Kim Seung-soo** – **First Love Again**; **Song Chang-eui** – **The Secret of My Love**; Im Ho – TV Novel: Dal Soon's Spring; Kim Dong-jun – Still Loving You; Lee Chang-wook – Lovers in Bloom	**Im Soo-hyang** – **Lovers in Bloom**; **Myung Se-bin** – **First Love Again**; Bae Jong-ok – Unknown Woman; Hong Ah-reum – TV Novel: Dal Soon's Spring; Lee Hwi-hyang – The Secret of My Love; Lee Young-eun – Still Loving You; Oh Seung-ah – A Sea of Her Own
Best Actor in a One-Act/Special/Short Drama	Best Actress in a One-Act/Special/Short Drama
**Yeo Hoe-hyun** – **Girls' Generation 1979**, **Drama Special – Waltzing Alone**; Gong Myung – The Happy Loner; Im Ji-kyu – Drama Special – Why We Can Not Sleep; Jang Dong-yoon – Drama Special – If We Were a Season; Kwak Dong-yeon – Drama Special – Slow; Seo Young-joo – Girls' Generation 1979; Son Ho-jun – Drama Special – Let Us Meet, Joo Oh	**Ra Mi-ran** – **Drama Special – Madame Jung's Last Week**; Bona – Girls' Generation 1979; Chae Soo-bin – Drama Special – If We Were a Season; Jo Bo-ah – Drama Special – Let Us Meet, Joo Oh; Kim So-hye – Drama Special – Kang Duk-soon's Love History; Min Hyo-rin – The Happy Loner; Moon Ka-young – Drama Special – Waltzing Alone
Best New Actor	Best New Actress
**Ahn Jae-hong** – **Fight for My Way**; **Woo Do-hwan** – **Mad Dog**; Jang Ki-yong – Confession Couple; Kim Jung-hyun – School 2017, Drama Special – Buzz Cut's date; Kim Seon-ho – Good Manager, Strongest Deliveryman; Lee Jun-ho – Good Manager; Lee Tae-hwan – My Golden Life; Song Won-seok – TV Novel: Dal Soon's Spring	**Kim Se-jeong** – **School 2017**; **Ryu Hwa-young** – **My Father is Strange**, **Mad Dog**; Bona – Girls' Generation 1979, Hit the Top; Lim Hwa-young – Good Manager; Pyo Ye-jin – Love Returns, Fight for My Way; Seo Eun-soo – My Golden Life
Best Supporting Actor	Best Supporting Actress
**Choi Won-young** – **Hwarang: The Poet Warrior Youth, Mad Dog**; **Kim Sung-oh** – **Fight for My Way**; Dong Ha – Good Manager, Drama Special – You're Closer Than I Think; In Gyo-jin – Ms. Perfect, Girls' Generation 1979; Jo Hee-bong – Strongest Deliveryman, Naked Fireman; Jo Jae-yoon – Mad Dog; Kim Won-hae – Hwarang: The Poet Warrior Youth, Good Manager	**Jung Hye-sung** – **Manhole**, **Good Manager**; **Lee Il-hwa** – **Good Manager**, **Witch at Court**; Hong Soo-hyun – Mad Dog; Kim Sun-young – Girls' Generation 1979; Kim Yeo-jin – Witch at Court; Lee Mi-do – My Father is Strange; Seo Jeong-yeon – Good Manager, Naked Fireman; Song Ha-yoon – Fight for My Way
Best Young Actor	Best Young Actress
**Jung Joon-won** – **My Father is Strange**; Baek Seung-hwan – Queen for Seven Days; Ji Min-hyuk – Witch at Court; Jo Yeon-ho – Fight for My Way	**Lee Re** – **Witch at Court**; Lee Han-seo – Fight for My Way; Park Si-eun – Queen for Seven Days; Shin Rin-ah – Drama Special – Madame Jung's Last Week; Uhm Chae-young – TV Novel: Dal Soon's Spring, First Love Again
Netizen Award, Actor	Netizen Award, Actress
**Park Seo-joon** – **Fight for My Way, Hwarang: The Poet Warrior Youth**; Go Kyung-pyo – Strongest Deliveryman; Kim Jung-hyun – School 2017; Kwon Sang-woo – Queen of Mystery; Lee Jun-ho – Good Manager; Namkoong Min – Good Manager; Park Hyung-sik – Hwarang: The Poet Warrior Youth; Son Ho-jun – Confession Couple; Woo Do-hwan – Mad Dog; Yoon Hyun-min – Witch at Court	**Kim Ji-won** – **Fight for My Way**; Chae Soo-bin – Strongest Deliveryman; Cho Yeo-jeong – Ms. Perfect; Choi Kang-hee – Queen of Mystery; Jang Na-ra – Confession Couple; Jung Ryeo-won – Witch at Court; Jung So-min – My Father is Strange; Kim Se-jeong – School 2017; Lee Yoo-ri – My Father is Strange; Shin Hye-sun – My Golden Life
Best Couple Award	Best Writer
**Namkoong Min** and **Lee Jun-ho** – **Good Manager**; **Park Seo-joon** and **Kim Ji-won** – **Fight for My Way**; **Park Si-hoo** and **Shin Hye-sun** – **My Golden Life**; **Ryu Soo-young** and **Lee Yoo-ri** – **My Father is Strange**; **Son Ho-jun** and **Jang Na-ra** – **Confession Couple**; **Yoon Hyun-min** and **Jung Ryeo-won** – **Witch at Court**; Ahn Jae-hong and Song Ha-yoon – Fight for My Way; Go Kyung-pyo and Chae Soo-bin – Strongest Deliveryman; Kim Jung-hyun and Kim Se-jeong – School 2017; Kim Seung-soo and Myung Se-bin – First Love Again; Kwon Sang-woo and Choi Kang-hee – Queen of Mystery; Namkoong Min and Nam Sang-mi – Good Manager; Woo Do-hwan and Ryu Hwa-young – Mad Dog	**So Hyun-kyung** – **My Golden Life**
Special Achievement Award	Drama OST Award
**Late Kim Young-ae**	**BtoB** – **"Ambiguous" (알듯 말듯해)** – **Fight for My Way**

== Presenters ==
Order	Presenter	Award	Ref.
1	Jung Yoon-seok, Heo Jung-eun	Best Young Actor/Actress	
2	Lee Jun-hyeok, Ra Mi-ran	Best Supporting Actor/Actress	
3	Yoon Doo-joon, Kim So-hyun	Best New Actor/Actress	
4	Jung Sung-hyo, Cho Yeo-jeong	Best Writer	
5	Park Se-ho, Jang Na-ra	Netizen Award	
6	Yoon Hyun-min, Kim Sook	Best Actor/Actress in a One-Act/Special/Short Drama	
7	Lee Dong-gun, Choi Kang-hee	Special Achievement Award	
8	Zhu Liyuan, Kim Ji-won	Drama OST Award	
9	Park Soo-hong, Park Kyung-lim	Best Couple Award	
10	Choi Daniel, Baek Jin-hee	Excellence Award in a Mid-length Drama	
11	Oh Min-suk, So Yi-hyun	Excellence Award in a Daily Drama	
12	Seo Kang-joon, Gong Seung-yeon	Excellence Award in a Miniseries	
13	Lee Sang-woo, Han Ji-hye	Excellence Award in a Serial Drama	
14	Park Bo-gum, Kim Yoo-jung	Top Excellence Award	
15	Song Joong-ki	Grand Prize (Daesang)	

== Special performances ==
Order	Artist	Song	Ref.
1	Poppin' Hyun Joon & Park Ae-ri	"Bat Song" (뱃 노래)	
2	The Uni+	Congratulatory Dance Performance: "That's What I Like" (Bruno Mars) "My Turn" (마이턴)	
3	BtoB (Eunkwang, Changsub, Hyunsik)	"Ambiguous" (알듯 말듯해) (Fight for My Way OST)	
3	Sohyang	"Wind Song" (바람의 노래) (Confession Couple OST)	
3	DinDin	"Must Be The Money" (Good Manager OST)	

== See also ==
- 2017 MBC Drama Awards
- 2017 SBS Drama Awards
