= Choi Won-young =

South Korean actor

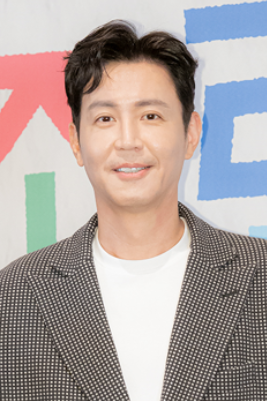
- Choi in 2024
- Born: Choi Seong-wook; January 10, 1976 (age 50); South Korea
- Education: Sangmyung University – Stage Design; Hongik University – Master's degree in Advertising and Public Relations
- Occupation: Actor
- Years active: 2002–present
- Agent(s): Hodu&U Entertainment
- Spouse: Shim Yi-young (m. 2014)
- Children: 2

Korean name
- Hangul: 최성욱
- RR: Choe Seonguk
- MR: Ch'oe Sŏnguk

Stage name
- Hangul: 최원영
- RR: Choe Wonyeong
- MR: Ch'oe Wŏnyŏng

Choi Won-young (Korean: 최원영; born Choi Seong-wook on January 10, 1976) is a South Korean actor.

== Career ==
Choi Won-young made his acting debut in 2002's Sex Is Zero, and has since appeared in both film and television. But his most notable roles have been in the TV dramas While You Were Sleeping, A Hundred Year Legacy, Sky Castle, Doctor Prisoner, Hwarang: The Beginning, Mad Dog as well as the low-budget crime thriller Your Time Is Up, which premiered at the 2012 Busan International Film Festival. In July 2024, Choi signed with new agency Hodu&U Entertainment.

== Personal life ==
Choi married actress Shim Yi-young on February 28, 2014, at the Grand Ballroom of the COEX Walkerhill Hotel in Samseong-dong. Choi and Shim met while filming the 2013 TV series A Hundred Year Legacy, where they played a married couple. On June 23, 2014, Choi's wife gave birth to their first child, a daughter. The couple's second daughter was born on June 14, 2017.

== Filmography ==
=== Film ===
| Year | Title | Role | Notes/Ref. |
|---|---|---|---|
| 2002 | Sex Is Zero | Park Chan-soo | |
| 2004 | To Catch a Virgin Ghost | Han-seok | |
| 2005 | Tarzan Park Heung-suk | Kang Hyun-woo | |
| 2005 | Love in Magic | Han Joon-seok | |
| 2006 | Mr. Wacky | Student teacher 1 | |
| 2007 | Cheaters | Seok-ho | |
| 2009 | Chaw | Sibi prosecutor | Cameo |
| 2010 | The Outlaw | Park Sung-chul | |
| 2011 | Earth Rep Rolling Stars | Jack | (voice) animated |
| 2011 | In Love and War | Jae-bok | Cameo |
| 2011 | Perfect Game | Sportscaster | Cameo |
| 2012 | Grape Candy | Ji-hoon | |
| 2012 | Ghost Sweepers | Choi Seung-woo | Cameo |
| 2012 | Confession of Murder | Jeong Tae-seok | |
| 2013 | Your Time Is Up | Seok-ho | |
| 2013 | Short! Short! Short! 2013 | Dong-kyu | segment: "Waltzing on Thunder" |
| 2014 | The Plan Man | Kang Byung-soo | |
| 2015 | Looking for My Family | Tae-seong | |
| 2019 | Jesters: The Game Changers | Hong Yoon-sung | |
| 2022 | Yaksha: Ruthless Operations | Lee Chan-young | Netflix Film |
| 2023 | Past Lives | Nora's father | Hollywood Film |
| 2024 | Land of Happiness | Baek Seung-gi | |
| 2026 | Dora | Sang-hun | |

=== Television series ===
| Year | Title | Role | Notes | Ref. |
|---|---|---|---|---|
| 2006 | Drama City: She's Smiling | Hyung-jin | | |
| 2007 | Heaven & Earth | Jang Young-min | | |
| 2007 | Belle | Im Kyung-ho | | |
| 2008 | You Are My Destiny | Nam Gyeong-woo | | |
| 2009 | Two Wives | Lee Young-min | | |
| 2009 | Queen Seondeok | General Gyebaek | Guest | |
| 2009 | Hometown of Legends Silent Village | Jin-sung | | |
| 2010 | Definitely Neighbors | Chae Ki-hoon | | |
| 2010 | KBS Drama Special: After the Opera | Lee Joong-do | | |
| 2010 | Stormy Lovers | Lee Tae-hoon | | |
| 2011 | While You Were Sleeping | Yoon Min-joon | | |
| 2012 | Tasty Life | Kang In-chul | | |
| 2013 | A Hundred Year Legacy | Kim Chul-gyu | | |
| 2013 | Wonderful Mama | Homeless man | Cameo (Episode 8) | |
| 2013 | Dating Agency: Cyrano | Sommelier | Cameo (Episode 1) | |
| 2013 | After School: Lucky or Not | Priest | Cameo | |
| 2013 | The Heirs | Yoon Jae-ho | | |
| 2014 | Three Days | Kim Do-jin | | |
| 2014 | KBS Drama Special: Climb the Sky Walls | Coach | | |
| 2014 | Diary of a Night Watchman | King Haejong | Cameo (Episode 1) | |
| 2014 | Secret Door | Chae Je-gong | | |
| 2015 | Kill Me, Heal Me | Ahn Gook | | |
| 2015 | Hello Monster | Lee Joon-ho | | |
| 2015 | Second 20s | Kim Woo-chul | | |
| 2016 | Come Back Mister | Cha Jae-guk | | |
| 2016–2017 | The Gentlemen of Wolgyesu Tailor Shop | Sung Tae-pyung | | |
| 2016–2017 | Hwarang: The Poet Warrior Youth | Ahn Ji | | |
| 2017 | While You Were Sleeping | Nam Chul-Doo | Cameo | |
| 2017 | Mad Dog | Joo Hyun-gi | | |
| 2017–2018 | Oh, the Mysterious | Jang-Pil Seong | | |
| 2018–2019 | Sky Castle | Hwang Chi-young | | |
| 2018 | Where Stars Land | Han Jae-young | | |
| 2019 | Doctor Prisoner | Lee Jae-Joon | | |
| 2019 | Nokdu Flower | Hwang Seok-joo | | |
| 2019 | KBS Drama Special : Scouting Report | | one act-drama | |
| 2020 | Hyena | Gong Hyun-kook | Cameo (Episode 5) | |
| 2020 | Mystic Pop-up Bar | Chief Gwi / Crown Prince Yi-Hon | | |
| 2020 | Alice | Seok Oh-won | | |
| 2020 | My Dangerous Wife | Kim Yoon-chul | | |
| 2021 | Youth of May | Hwang Hee-tae (Older) | Cameo (Episode 12) | |
| 2021 | Reflection of You | Ahn Hyeon-seong | | |
| 2021–2022 | Moonshine | Lee Si-heum | | |
| 2022 | The Golden Spoon | Hwang Hyeon-do | | |
| 2022 | Under the Queen's Umbrella | King Yi Ho | | |
| 2023 | O'PENing: Don't Press the Peach | Kim Kang-soo | one act-drama | |
| 2023 | The First Responders | Ha Young-doo | Season 2; Cameo (episode 1) | |
| 2023 | Twinkling Watermelon | adult Ha Yi-chan | | |
| 2024 | Family by Choice | Yoon Jeong Jae | | |
| 2025 | Our Chocolate Moments | Hong Sa-jang | | |
| 2026 | Undercover Miss Hong | Kang Myung-hwi | Special appearances | |
| 2026 | Phantom Lawyer | Shin Ki-joong | Special appearances | |
| 2026 | We Are All Trying Here | Choi Dong-hyun | | |

=== Television shows ===
| Year | Title | Role | Notes | Ref. |
|---|---|---|---|---|
| 2018–2019 | Apart Together | Regular Member | Episode 1–10 | |
| 2021 | Delicious Rendezvous | Cast Member | Episode 78–90 | |
| 2023 | Europe Outside the Tent | Cast Member | Season 2 | |

=== Music video appearances ===
| Year | Song title | Artist |
|---|---|---|
| 2007 | "Woman" | Jung Il-young |
| 2013 | "Love in Memory" | Byul |

== Theater ==
| Year | Title | Role |
|---|---|---|
| 2003 | Pandora's Box | |
| 2009–2010 | Love's Labour's Lost | Ji-am |

== Awards and nominations ==
| Year | Award | Category | Nominated work | Result |
|---|---|---|---|---|
| 2014 | SBS Drama Awards | Special Award, Actor in a Serial Drama | Secret Door | Nominated |
| 2016 | KBS Drama Awards | Best Supporting Actor | The Gentlemen of Wolgyesu Tailor Shop | Nominated |
| 2017 | KBS Drama Awards | Best Supporting Actor | Hwarang: The Poet Warrior Youth and Mad Dog | Won |
| 2019 | KBS Drama Awards | Excellence Award, Actor in a Miniseries | Doctor Prisoner | Won |
| 2019 | KBS Drama Awards | Best Actor in a One-Act/Special/Short Drama | Drama Special – Scouting Report | Nominated |
| 2019 | KBS Drama Awards | Netizen Award, Actor | Doctor Prisoner | Nominated |
| 2022 | MBC Drama Awards | Best Character Award | The Golden Spoon | Won |
| 2022 | OBS (Hot Icon) Awards | Actor | The Golden Spoon | Won |
