= Mad Dog (TV series) =

2017 South Korean television series

- Promotional poster
- Hangul: 매드독
- RR: Maedeudok
- MR: Maedŭdok
- Genre: Action
- Created by: KBS Drama Production
- Written by: Kim Soo-jin
- Directed by: Hwang Ee-kyeong
- Starring: Yoo Ji-tae; Woo Do-hwan; Ryu Hwa-young; Jo Jae-yoon; Kim Hye-sung; Hong Soo-hyun
- Music by: Kim Jun-seok
- Country of origin: South Korea
- Original language: Korean
- No. of episodes: 16

Production
- Executive producers: Kang Byung-taek (KBS); Park Jae-sam; Shim Jae-hyun
- Producers: Kim Young-chon; Lee Young-bum
- Camera setup: Single-camera
- Running time: 60 mins
- Production companies: Imagine Asia; Celltrion Entertainment

Original release
- Network: KBS 2TV
- Release: October 11 – November 30, 2017

Mad Dog (Korean: 매드독) is a South Korean television series starring Yoo Ji-tae, Woo Do-hwan, and Ryu Hwa-young. It aired on KBS2, from October 11, 2017 to November 30, 2017 on Wednesdays and Thursdays at 22:00 (KST) for 16 episodes.

== Synopsis ==
Choi Kang-woo, a former police and leader of Taeyang Insurance's investigators team, decides to create his own investigation team, Mad Dog, after an airplane crash takes the life of his wife and son. Two years later, he meets Kim Min-joon, a genius former swindler who is the younger brother of Kim Beom-joon, the co-pilot of the crashed JH 801 airplane, who was accused of crashing the aircraft on purpose in a suicide attempt.

== Cast ==
=== Main (Mad Dog) ===
- Yoo Ji-tae as Choi Kang-woo / Mad Dog

A former policeman and leader of the Mad Dog team. He has good eyes and sharp instincts, which help him achieve a 99% arrest rate. After meeting Kim Beom-joon's brother, he becomes suspicious of the reason for his wife and son's death, and so decides to re-investigate the case.

- Woo Do-hwan as Kim Min-joon / Jan Gebauer / Doctor Kim

A genius former swindler who was abandoned by his German foster parents. He has wits and good instincts, which allows him to transform into anybody. After 2 years, he returns to South Korea to prove his brother's innocence.

- Ryu Hwa-young as Jang Ha-ri / Player Jang

A former competing gymnast skilled at disguising herself in order to investigate insurance fraud schemes.

- Jo Jae-yoon as Park Soon-jung / Cheetah

An ex-thug with striking criminal records, who is now an insurance investigator that dreams of becoming a pediatric nurse for his love of children.

- Kim Hye-seong as On Nu-ri / Pentium

A computer genius who is allergic to the sun and hates going outside.

- Hong Soo-hyun as Cha Hong-joo

The only daughter of Cha Joon-kyu and Director of Taeyang Insurance. She has a crush on Kang-woo, but eventually decides to side with her father.

=== Supporting ===
==== Taeyang Life Insurance ====
- Jeong Bo-seok as Cha Joon-kyu

Chairman of Taeyang Life Insurance.

- Jang Hyuk-jin as Park Moo-shin

Kang-woo's best friend who still works at Taeyang Insurance.

==== Juhan Airlines ====
- Choi Won-young as Joo Hyun-gi

Vice-president of JH Airlines. He is extremely cunning in planning strategies against his enemy.

==== Others ====
- Lee Jun-hyeok as Jo Han-woo

Kang-woo's fellow teammate back when he was a policeman.

- Park In-hwan as Byun Gook-jin
- Baek Ji-won as Oh Seo-ra
- Kim Young-hoon as Kim Bum-joon

Kim Min-joon's older brother. Co-pilot of the crashed JH 801, who was accused of crashing the plane on purpose to take his own life.

- Park Sung-hoon as Ko Jin Chul
- Park Min-jung as Lee Young-mi

== Production ==
Gong Myung was initially offered the role of Kim Min-joon.

== Original soundtrack ==
Mad Dog OST

Soundtrack album by Various artists
- Released: 2017
- Genre: Soundtrack
- Language: Korean
- Labels: Warner Music Korea; Leon Korea

=== Part 1 ===
Released on Oct 12, 2017
No.	Title	Artists	Length
1.	"Before The Sun Sets" (해가 지기 전에)	Eric Nam	3:11
2.	"Before The Sun Sets" (Inst.)		3:11
Total length:			6:22

=== Part 2 ===
Released on Oct 19, 2017
No.	Title	Artist	Length
1.	"What I Want" (당신이 원하는 것)	NiiHWA	3:22
2.	"What I Want" (Inst.)		3:22
Total length:			6:44

=== Part 3 ===
Released on Nov 29, 2017
No.	Title	Artist	Length
1.	"You Can Cry" (당신은 울 수 있습니다)	Chan Yang	4:26
2.	"You Can Cry" (Inst.)		4:26
Total length:			8:52

== Ratings ==
- In this table, The blue numbers represent the lowest ratings and the red numbers represent the highest ratings.
- NR denotes that the drama did not rank in the top 20 daily programs on that date.

Ep.	Broadcast date	Average audience share			
Ep.	Broadcast date	TNmS		AGB Nielsen Ratings	
Ep.	Broadcast date	Nationwide	Seoul	Nationwide	Seoul
1	October 11, 2017	6.2% (20th)	6.6% (20th)	5.5% (NR)	6.2% (NR)
2	October 12, 2017	5.4% (NR)	6.4% (19th)	4.8% (NR)	5.5% (NR)
3	October 18, 2017	8.2% (13th)	7.9% (14th)	6.9% (16th)	6.6% (15th)
4	October 19, 2017	5.8% (NR)	6.4% (NR)	5.5% (NR)	6.1% (NR)
5	October 25, 2017	7.1% (18th)	7.5% (14th)	6.4% (NR)	6.5% (NR)
6	October 26, 2017	5.8% (NR)	6.5% (NR)	5.7% (NR)	6.4% (NR)
7	November 1, 2017	5.5% (NR)	5.8% (18th)	5.5% (17th)	5.7% (17th)
8	November 2, 2017	5.1% (NR)	5.5% (NR)	5.6% (NR)	6.1% (NR)
9	November 8, 2017	7.2% (18th)	7.8% (15th)	7.1% (16th)	7.0% (14th)
10	November 9, 2017	7.1% (NR)	7.3% (16th)	6.8% (16th)	6.6% (17th)
11	November 15, 2017	6.4% (17th)	6.1% (18th)	6.8% (16th)	6.9% (14th)
12	November 16, 2017	6.4% (NR)	6.7% (19th)	6.4% (NR)	6.6% (NR)
13	November 22, 2017	7.2% (16th)	7.8% (14th)	7.4% (13th)	7.5% (12th)
14	November 23, 2017	8.0% (13th)	7.8% (13th)	8.3% (10th)	8.4% (11th)
15	November 29, 2017	7.8% (11th)	7.5% (10th)	7.5% (13th)	7.5% (14th)
16	November 30, 2017	9.3% (12th)	8.6% (10th)	9.7% (7th)	9.7% (6th)
Average		6.78%	7.01%	6.62%	6.83%

== Awards and nominations ==
Year	Award	Category	Recipient	Result	Ref.
2017	31st KBS Drama Awards	Top Excellence Award, Actor	Yoo Ji-tae	Nominated	
2017	31st KBS Drama Awards	Excellence Award, Actor in a Miniseries	Yoo Ji-tae	Nominated	
2017	31st KBS Drama Awards	Best New Actor	Woo Do-hwan	Won	
2017	31st KBS Drama Awards	Best New Actress	Ryu Hwa-young	Won	
2017	31st KBS Drama Awards	Best Supporting Actor	Choi Won-young	Won	
2017	31st KBS Drama Awards	Best Supporting Actor	Jo Jae-yoon	Nominated	
2017	31st KBS Drama Awards	Best Supporting Actress	Hong Soo-hyun	Nominated	
2017	31st KBS Drama Awards	Netizen Award	Woo Do-hwan	Nominated	
2017	31st KBS Drama Awards	Best Couple Award	Woo Do-hwan and Ryu Hwa-young	Nominated	
2018	6th APAN Star Awards	Best New Actor	Woo Do-hwan	Nominated	
2018	2nd The Seoul Awards	Best New Actor	Woo Do-hwan	Nominated	
