= Da Man =

Indonesian men's fashion and lifestyle magazine

- Cover of the December 2015 – January 2016 issue, featuring Hidetoshi Nakata
- Categories: Men's fashion, lifestyle
- Frequency: Bi-monthly
- First issue: 2007
- Company: Destin Asian Media Group
- Country: Indonesia
- Language: English, Indonesia
- Website: daman.co.id

Da Man is an English-language Indonesian bimonthly men's fashion and lifestyle magazine, catering to male readers aged between 20 and 40. The magazine was first published in May 2007. It is published in Jakarta by the DestinAsian Media Group and features exclusive interviews and photo shoots of Hollywood actors, as well as Indonesian artists.

Cover models have included Star Trek actor Chris Pine (June/July 2009), retired Japanese soccer player and entrepreneur Hidetoshi Nakata (August/September 2009 and December 2015/January 2016), Twilight actor Kellan Lutz (June/July 2010), Paul Wesley of The Vampire Diaries (April/May 2010), Step Up 3D star Rick Malambri (August/September 2010), Glee star Mark Salling (October/November 2010), Garrett Hedlund (December 2010/January 2011), and Glee star Darren Criss (February 2011). Other featured actors have included Alex Meraz, Lucas Till, Daniel Dae Kim, Olivia Munn, Julia Jones, Brody Jenner, Grant Bowler, Jesse Metcalfe, Colton Haynes and Chord Overstreet of Glee.

Da Man is distributed mainly in Indonesia. The magazine is also distributed in Singapore and the United States.
