= Seo Sang-won =

South Korean actor (born 1967)

- 서상원
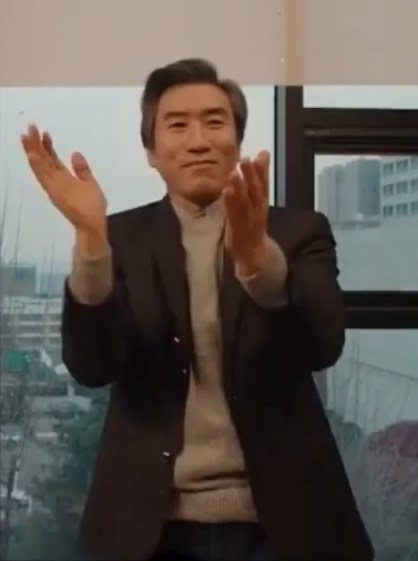
- Seo in 2020
- Born: 11 November 1967 (age 58); South Korea
- Occupation: Actor
- Years active: 1992–present

Korean name
- Hangul: 서상원
- Hanja: 徐祥源
- RR: Seo Sangwon
- MR: Sŏ Sangwŏn

Seo Sang-won (Korean: 서상원, November 11, 1967) is a South Korean actor. He has appeared in supporting roles in various films and television dramas, but is better known for his work as a stage actor. His most known works in television series are Record of Youth (2020), Hometown Cha-Cha-Cha (2021) and Queen of Tears (2024).

== Education ==
In 1986, Seo enrolled in the Department of Tourism Management at Catholic Kwandong University. During his studies, he was an active member of the university theater club, "Gil Donga People." Seo's interest in a performing arts career developed during a period of travel in Europe, where he observed the professional pride and public reception of street performers. This experience led him to re-evaluate his career goals; although he initially sought corporate employment for financial stability, he chose to pursue theater professionally in 1992.

== Career ==
=== Beginning ===
In 1992, Seo briefly worked in the sales department of Hyundai Motor Company before joining the Theatre Company Michu. (Note: Theatre Company Michu (Korean: 극단 미추; Hanja: 美醜) was founded in August 1986 by Son Jin-chaek. The theater company Michu originated with the 'Son Jinchaek Directing Lab', which established when CEO Son Jin-chaek was the representative of the Minye Theater. Michu continues to search for the identity of Korean theater that emphasizes spirit rather than form . Since 1987, Michu has performed Madangnori works every year. Madangnori refers to traditional Korean theater that combines various forms of folk entertainment, such as puppetry, mask dances and traditional percussion music.) During his five-year tenure with the company, he gained experience in translation, creative writing, and performance. His credits with the troupe include General Oh's Claw by Park Jo-yeol, Namsadang Sky, and several MBC Madangnori productions.

Following his departure from the company in 1995, Seo began working as a freelance actor. In 1997, he was appointed as a lecturer in the Department of Acting at the Sungkyunkwan University Social Education Center. During this period, director Lee Gwang-mo cast Seo in his film debut, Spring in My Hometown (also known as Beautiful Days), after viewing a recording of one of Seo's stage performances. Seo has attributed his career longevity to the establishment of consistent professional values and a focused approach to his creative goals.

=== Career as member of National Theater Company of Korea ===
In 2001, Seo became member of National Theater Company of Korea (NTCK). That same year, he appeared in a production of Shakespeare's Hamlet, performing the roles of a nobleman, a Norwegian soldier, and Guildenstern.

In 2007, after six years with the National Theater Company of Korea (NTCK), Seo was cast in the title role of Terrorist Hamlet. The production was a collaboration between the NTCK and German director Jens-Daniel Herzog, the former Artistic Director of the Mannheim National Theater. The script was adapted by Kim Min-hye and Johannes Kirsten as part of the NTCK's "World Masterpiece Stage" series. The production featured a contemporary reimagining of the classic play; Seo's Hamlet was depicted wearing modern clothing and carrying a pistol, while Claudius was portrayed as a democratic leader. For his performance, Seo received the Best Actor award at the 2008 Korea Drama Awards and a 2008 Commendation from the Minister of Culture, Sports and Tourism.

In 2008, the NTCK and director Jens-Daniel Herzog collaborated again for a second run of Terrorist Hamlet, staged as the 210th "World Masterpiece Stage" regular performance. Seo reprised his role as Hamlet. In 2010, Seo was awarded a Commendation from the Minister of Culture, Sports and Tourism. He did not attend the official ceremony.

=== Career as freelance actor ===
In 2011, Seo performed alongside Kim Young-pil, Kim Joo-wan, and Jeon Mi-do in the play The Author by British playwright Tim Crouch. Directed by Kim Dong-hyeon, the production served as the inaugural entry in the Doosan Art Center's "Borderline" series. The play is characterized by its experimental structure, which blurs the distinction between the performers and the audience while examining the psychological impact of violent theatrical content on both creators and viewers.

Seo made his television debut in 2017 with a minor role as a pastor in the series Prison Playbook. Following this debut, he continued to take primarily minor and supporting roles in television and film while maintaining his focus on theater. In 2019, he made a cameo appearance in the independent film Lucky Chan-sil.

== Filmography ==
=== Film ===
List of Film(s)
Year	Title		Role	Ref.
Year	English	Original	Role	Ref.
1993	Three Cups of Coffee	커피석잔	Tae-shik	
1998	Beautiful Times	아름다운 시절	Seong-hwan	
1998	Lee Jae-soo's Rebellion	이재수의 난	Musician 2	
2003	I live in the train station	역전에 산다	Reporter	
2005	Typhoon Taeyang	태풍태양	CF cameraman	
2005	Blood Silkworm	혈의 누	Villager 3	
2009	Marine Boy	마린보이	VIP Member 2	
2015	The Black Priests	검은 사제들	Professor	
2016	Detective Hong Gil-dong: The Lost Village	탐정 홍길동: 사라진 마을	TV Debate Professor	
2017	The Mayor	특별시민	Park Won	
2019	Lucky Chan-sil	찬실이는 복도 많지	Director Ji	Cameo
2019	Ruby	루비	Director	

=== Television ===
List of television series
Year	Title		Role	Note	Ref.
Year	English	Original	Role	Note	Ref.
2017	Prison Playbook	슬기로운 감빵생활	Pastor's prison guard	tvN	
2018	KBS Drama Special: "Review Notebook of My Embarrassing Days"	나의 흑역사 오답노트	Professor Bong	KBS	
2018	My Mister	나의 아저씨	Go Jin-beom	tvN	
2018	Mr. Sunshine	미스터 션샤인	Go Sa-Hong's relative	tvN	ep.10
2019	Her Private Life	그녀의 사생활	Noh Seok Photographer	tvN	
2019	Be Melodramatic	멜로가 체질	Jin-joo's father	JTBC	
2019	Vagabond	배가본드	Choi Jeong-woon – Airplane captain	SBS TV	
2020	My Unfamiliar Family	아는 건 별로 없지만	Yoo Seon-il	tvN	
2020	Melting Me Softly	날 녹여주오	Doctor Yoon	tvN	
2020	Record of Youth	청춘기록	Won Tae-kyeong	tvN	
2020	More Than Friends	경우의 수	Kyung Man-ho	JTBC	
2020	True Beauty	여신강림	Kang Joon-hyuk	tvN	
2020	Sell Your Haunted House	대박부동산	Yang Woo-Jin's father	KBS2	Ep. 1
2021	Hometown Cha-Cha-Cha	갯마을 차차차	Yoon Tae-ha	tvN	
2023	My Demon	마이 데몬	Priest	tvN	
2024	Queen of Tears	눈물의 여왕	Dr. Park Jin-kook	tvN	

== Stage ==
=== Theater ===
All works as Member of Theater Company Michu (1992 to 1997)
Year	Title		Role	Theatre	Date	Ref.
Year	English	Korean	Role	Theatre	Date	Ref.
1992	16th Seoul Theatre Festival: Strangers	(제16회) 서울연극제 : 이방인들	Lee Ju-seok	Literary Centre Big Theatre	September 2 to 7	
1993	Namsadang's Sky	남사당의 하늘	Beonaso	National Theatre of Korea Grand Theatre	June 18 to 24	
1993	Incense Day	제향날	soldier, commander, friend, primitive person	Cultural Center Small Theater	November 26 to 29	
1994	Macbeth	맥베드	Macbeth	Arts and Culture Center Grand Theater	May 24–30	
1994	Namsadang's Sky	남사당의 하늘	Beonaso	National Theatre of Korea Grand Theatre	June 18 to 26	
1994	General Oh's Claw	오장군의 발톱	Sergeant, Driver	Seoul Arts Center Towol Theater	November 22 to 25	
1995	General Oh's Claw	오장군의 발톱	Sergeant, Driver	National Theatre of Korea Small Theatre	June 5 to 17	
1995	From heaven to earth – Gyunwoo and Jiknyeo	하늘에서 땅에서 – 견우와 직녀	Elders of Heaven	National Theatre of Korea Grand Theatre	November 25 to 29	
1995	The Good Person of Szechwan	사천사는 착한사람		Jeonbuk Cultural Center	December 16 to 17, 1995	
1996	In the mountains when spring comes	봄이오면 산에들에				
1996	Tom Tom Nangrang Tom, Love Story of Hodong and Nangrang	둥둥 낙랑 둥	Dwarf	Seoul Art Center CJ Towol Theater	July 12–24	

=== Theater performances started from 2001 ===
Theater Performances started from 2001
Year	Title		Role	Theater	Date	Ref.
Year	English	Korean	Role	Theater	Date	Ref.
1998	Flower Swing	꽃그네	Geo Seung-pae	National Theatre of Korea Small Theatre	March 13 to 22	
1999	23rd Seoul Theater Festival: White Circle	(제23회) 서울연극제 : 하얀 동그라미		Hakjeon Blue Small Theater	September 4 to October 17	
2001	The Wedding Day	맹진사댁 경사	Close Relative	National Theatre Daloreum Theatre	January 21 to 28	
2001	Secret History of King Gongmin, Pamonggi	공민왕 비사, 파몽기	People	National Theatre Haeoreum Theatre	March 23 to April 1	
2001	When I Turned Nine	나 어릴적에	Close up philosopher, Geum Boklee's father	National Theatre Daloreum Theatre	May 3 to 25	
2001	Hamlet	햄릿	nobleman, norwegian soldier, guildenstern	National Theatre Haeoreum Theatre	September 7 to 16	
2002	Presto Korea Fantasy	마르고 닳도록	Secretary of the Embassy, Don Carlos Secundo	National Theatre Daloreum Theatre	February 8 to 17	
2002	Ki-saeng-bi-saeng ChunhyangJeon	기생비생 춘향전	Corpse's brother	National Theatre Daloreum Theatre	April 9 to 21	
2002	Korean Wooturi	우리나라 우투리	Donkey, Wooturi Soldier	Seoul Arts Center Jayu Small Theater	August 23 – September 1	
2002	Three Loves about Family – Home	집	Brother in law	National Theatre Daloreum Theatre	September 4 to 10	
2002	Julius Caesar	줄리어스 시저	Citizen, Athedorus, Klitters	National Theatre Daloreum Theatre	November 29 to December 8	
2003	Three Loves about Family – Home	집	Brother in law	National Theatre Daloreum Theatre	February 14 to 23	
2003	Titus Andronicus	타이터스 앤드러니커스	Saturninus	National Theatre Daloreum Theatre	April 18 to 25	
2003	Problematic Human Yeoun-san	문제적 인간 연산	Instead of young 2	National Theatre Daloreum Theatre	September 11 to 21	
2004	Thunderstorm	뇌우	Jo Woo-ping	National Theatre Daloreum Theatre	April 1 to 7	
2004	The Bourgeois Gentleman	귀족놀이	Swordsman Teacher, Mufti	National Theatre Daloreum Theatre	September 11 to 24	
2005	The Robbers	떼도적	Spiegelberg	National Theatre Haeoreum Theatre	April 29 to May 28	
2005	Splash	물보라	Yong-man	National Theatre Daloreum Theatre	June 9 to 19	
2005	The Wedding Day	맹진사댁 경사	Close Relative	National Theatre Daloreum Theatre	November 9 to 13	
2005	Story of a Stairway	어느 계단 이야기	Urbano	National Theatre Daloreum Theatre	April 1 to 12	
2006	The Bourgeois Gentleman	귀족놀이	Swordsman Teacher, Mufti	National Theatre Daloreum Theatre	June 3 to 11	
2006	Our Town	우리 읍내	Choir Sosi	National Theatre Daloreum Theatre	July 21 to August 6	
2006	Life Cord	태	Dan-jong	National Theatre Daloreum Theatre	November 10 to 19	
2007	The Yellow Inn	황색여관	Lawyer	National Theater Byuloreum Theater	March 22 to April 8	
2007	Wildfire	산불	Won-tae	National Theatre Daloreum Theatre	June 22 to 29	
2007	Life Cord	태	Dan-jong	National Theatre Daloreum Theatre	September 11, 2007 – September 23, 2007	
2007	Terrorist Hamlet	테러리스트 햄릿	Hamlet	National Theatre Daloreum Theatre	November 6, 2007 – November 24, 2007	
2007–2008	Winter Sunflower	겨울 해바라기	Tsuyuko	National Theater Byuloreum Theater	December 27, 2007 to January 6, 2008	
2008	Terrorist Hamlet	테러리스트 햄릿	Hamlet	National Theater Daloreum Theater	March 14 to 23	
2008	The Centennial Promise	백년언약	man, rooster	National Theater Haeoreum Theater	May 28, 2008 – June 1, 2008	
2008	Terrorist Hamlet	테러리스트 햄릿	Hamlet	National Theater Daloreum Theater	September 18 to 26	
2009	Three Sisters	세자매	Staff Captain Vassily Vasilyevich Solyony	Myeongdong Arts Theater, Seoul	September 4 to 13	
2009	New Birds	새 새	Persuasion	National Theater of Korea Haneul Theater	April 4 to 10	
2009	Tom Tom Nangrang Tom, Love Story of Hodong and Nangrang	둥둥 낙랑 둥	Uncle, Lion	National Theater of Korea Haneul Theater	December 22 to 27	
2010	Tom Tom Nangrang Tom, Love Story of Hodong and Nangrang	둥둥 낙랑 둥	Uncle, Lion	National Theater of Korea Haneul Theater	January 6 to 15	
2010	Macbeth Below the Equator	적도아래의 맥베스	Kim Choon-gil	Myeongdong Arts Theater	October 2, 2010 – October 14, 2010	
2011	The Author	디 오써	Writer	Doosan Art Center Space111	April 26, 2011 – May 28, 2011	
2011	Woyzeck	보이체크	Franz Woyzeck	Daehakro Arts Theater Grand Theater	August 21, 2011 – September 10, 2011	
2012	The Song of Spring Flows to the Sea	봄의 노래는 바다에 흐르고	Lieutenant General Shinoda	Namsan Arts Center Drama Center	June 12, 2012 – July 1, 2012	
2012	Long Day's Journey into Night	밤으로의 긴 여로	Edmund	Myeongdong Arts Theater	October 19, 2012 – November 11, 2012	
2013	The Story of Blue Boat	푸른배 이야기	Governor, I, Captain Nam Ho-cheol, Hong Gil, Dal-young, local residents	National Theater of Korea Small Theater	March 8, 2013 – March 24, 2013	
2013	Hot Spring in Asia	아시아 온천	—	CJ Towol Theater, Seoul Arts Center	June 10, 2013 – June 16, 2013	
2013	The Story of Blue Boat (Yeong-yang)	푸른배 이야기	Governor, I, Captain Nam Ho-cheol, Hong Gil, Dal-young, local residents	Nutrition Culture and Sports Centre	July 11	
2014	Whale	고래	Jo-jang	Sogang University Mary Hall	April 17, 2014 – May 4, 2014	
2014	The Shadow Boy	그림자 아이	Kwon	National Theater Baekseonghui Changminho Theater	October 24, 2014 – November 2, 2014	
2015	Three Sisters	세자매	Staff Captain Vassily Vasilyevich Solyony	Sogang University Mary Hall Grand Theater in Sinsu-dong, Seoul	October 30 to November 8	
2015	Chimerica	차이메리카	Joe Schofield	Doosan Art Center Space111	April 14, 2015 – May 16, 2015	
2016	Copenhagen	코펜하겐	Werner Heisenberg	Dongsoong Art Center Studio Theater	July 14, 2016 – July 31, 2016	
2017	Wonmu Intel	원무인텔	Kang Jung-hwan	Jin Theatre (formerly Algwahaek Small Theater)	May 4, 2017 – May 14, 2017	
2017	Delinquent Youth	불량청년	—	30 Studio	May 25, 2017 – June 11, 2017	
2017	Delinquent Youth	불량청년	—	Naru Art Center Main Theater	June 17, 2017 – June 25, 2017	
2018	Lonely person, difficult person, sad person	외로운 사람, 힘든 사람, 슬픈 사람	Aleksandr Vladimirovich Serebryakov	Doosan Art Center Space111	October 5, 2018 – October 27, 2018	
2022	Merry Christmas, Mom	메리크리스마스, 엄마	Son	JTN Art Hall 1	February 24, 2022 – February 27, 2022	
2022	Two Popes	두 교황	Pope Benedict XVI	KEPCO Art Center	August 30, 2022 – October 30, 2022	

== Accolades ==
=== Award ===
List of award(s)
Award	Year	Category	Works	Result	Ref.
Korean Drama Award	2008	Best Actor	Terrorist Hamlet	Won	

=== State honors ===
List of State Honour(s)
Country	Organization	Year	Honor	Ref.
South Korea	The Minister of Culture, Sports and Tourism	2008	Commendation from the Minister of Culture, Sports and Tourism for play Terrorist Hamlet	
South Korea	The Minister of Culture, Sports and Tourism	2010	Commendation from the Minister of Culture, Sports and Tourism; For former members of the National Theater Company (Note: It was said that he was nominated again in 2010 but refused to accept it)	
