= Milky Way Liberation Front =

- Theatrical poster
- Directed by: Yoon Seong-ho
- Written by: Yoon Seong-ho
- Produced by: Kim Jho Kwang-soo
- Starring: Im Ji-kyu; Park Hyuk-kwon; Seo Young-ju
- Cinematography: Kwon Sang-jun
- Edited by: Noh Yu-jeong
- Music by: Park Yong-jeon
- Distributed by: Indie Story
- Release date: November 29, 2007
- Running time: 85 minutes
- Country: South Korea
- Language: Korean

Milky Way Liberation Front (Korean: 은하해방전선; RR: Eunhahaebangjeonseon) is a 2007 South Korean film.

== Plot ==
Yeong-jae is dumped by his girlfriend as he struggles writing the script for his new film. As the pressure mounts, he develops aphasia.

== Cast ==
- Im Ji-kyu as Yeong-jae
- Park Hyuk-kwon as Hyuk-kwon
- Seo Young-ju as Eun-ha
- Kim Bo-kyung as Eun-kyeong
- Lee Eun-sung as Eun-seong
- Yu Hyeong-geun as Kimura Rei
- Yukie Mori as Japanese actress
- Park Mi-hyeon as Delegate Choi
- Jeong Seung-gil as PD Jeong
- Oh Chang-kyeong as Byeong-gil, cinematographer
- Jang Jeong-ae as Eun-jin, sound engineer
- Andrew Sung as Overseas staff
- Jo Han-chul as Columnist
