= Ahn Ji-hyun =

South Korean actress (born 1992)

- 안지현
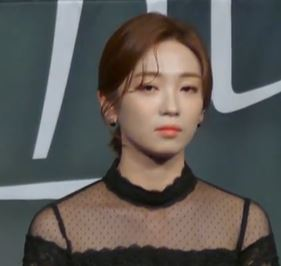
- Ahn in October 2018
- Born: July 10, 1992 (age 34); Busan, South Korea
- Education: Yonsei University - East Asian Economy and Business
- Occupation: Actress
- Years active: 2010–present
- Agent: Koom Entertainment

Korean name
- Hangul: 안지현
- Hanja: 安智炫
- RR: An Jihyeon
- MR: An Chihyŏn

Ahn Ji-hyun (Korean: 안지현, born July 10, 1992) is a South Korean actress.

== Filmography ==
=== Television series ===
Year	Title	Role	Notes	Ref.
2010	Drama Special		Episode: "Texas Hit"	
2011	While You Were Sleeping	Maeng Hyun-joo		
2011	Drama Special	Yoon Yeo-kyung	Episode: "Daughters of Bilitis Club"	
2012	Koisuru Maison ~Rainbow Rose~			
2012	School 2013	Ahn Ji-hyun		
2013	Drama Special Series	Moon Soo-jung	Episode: "Puberty Medley"	
2013	Secret Love	Yang Hae-ri		
2013	Drama Special	Choon-gil	Episode: "The Devil Rider"	
2014	Beyond the Clouds	Kang Han-na		
2014	Drama Special	Hwa-joo	Episode: "The Dirge Singer"	
2014	Gunman in Joseon	Jan-yi		
2015	Drama Special	Hee-jung	Episode: ""Crimson Moon"	
2016	Guardian: The Lonely and Great God	Go Jung-hyun		
2017	Prison Playbook	Ji-ho's friend		
2018	The Time	Oh Young-hee		
2018	When Time Stopped	Kim Sun-ah		

=== Film ===
Year	Title	Role	Notes/Ref.
2013	The Flu		
2013	Hello Seoul	Park Mi-ok	Promotional web short film produced for MIOGGI Hong Kong
2019	Jo Pil-ho: The Dawning Rage	Police officer	

=== Music video appearances ===
Year	Song title	Artist
2012	"Don't You Know"	Halla Man
