= My Prettiest Moments =

- KBS Drama Special episode
- Episode no.: Season 3 Episode 9
- Directed by: Baek Sang-hoon
- Written by: Lee Hyun-joo
- Original air date: August 26, 2012
- Running time: 71 minutes

Episode chronology
← Previous "A Still Picture"	Next → "Glass Prison"

"My Prettiest Moments" (Korean: 내가 가장 예뻤을때) is the ninth episode of the third season of the South Korean anthology series KBS Drama Special. Starring Jeon Ye-seo and Lee Jong-suk, it aired on KBS2 August 26, 2012.

== Synopsis ==
Lee Shin-ae (Jeon Ye-seo) is terminally ill with cancer and wants to live the rest of her given life without treatment but is forced into the hospital by her husband. There she meets Yoon Jung-hyuk (Lee Jong-suk), a popular university student who is the guardian and takes care of his sick girlfriend. Jung-hyuk falls in love with Shin-ae and finds out the meaning of true love. Shin-ae, while nearing the end of her life, finds new meaning to her life and love.

== Cast ==
- Jeon Ye-seo as Lee Shin-ae
- Lee Jong-suk as Yoon Jung-hyuk
- Song Young-kyu as Kim Ui-soo
- Kim Soo-yeon as Kim Yoon-ah

== Episode ratings ==
Date	Episode	Nationwide	Seoul
2012-08-26	1	(<3.2)	(<8.3)

Source: TNS Media Korea
