= Do You Know Taekwondo? =

- KBS Drama Special episode
- Promotional poster
- Episode no.: Season 3 Episode 14
- Directed by: Kim Young-kyun
- Written by: Yoo Bo-ra
- Original air date: October 7, 2012
- Running time: 68 minutes

Episode chronology
← Previous "My Wife Natree's First Love"	Next → "A Corner"

"Do You Know Taekwondo?" (Korean: 태권, 도를 아십니까?; RR: Taekwon, Doreul Ahshibnikka? is the fourteenth episode of the third season of the South Korean anthology series KBS Drama Special. Starring Im Ji-kyu, Niel and Han Yeo-reum, it aired on KBS2 on October 7, 2012.

== Synopsis ==
Yoon Do-hyeon dreams of becoming an action star but like his father before him can only get roles as a stunt actor. Out of the blue he is called up by the sports director of his old school, the school Taekwondo team has lost its coach and he wants Yoon Do-hyeon to take over as coach. Although Yoon was on the school Taekwondo team he was not the star athlete, of the same name, that the director thinks he is. However Yoon is just scraping by and takes the job anyway.

The school Taekwondo team is a far cry from the team that Yoon Do-hyeon was a member of, it has just six students who attend training just to bump up their course credits or to avoid detention. To cap it all the three best students at Taekwondo are outright bullies. In order to cut costs the school principal orders the Taekwondo team to be cut if it cannot attract more students.

Despite scepticism by the students Yoon manages to bluff his way through the sessions, using the two skills he does have. His stage combat experience makes him an excellent judge of distance and timing, so much so, that until he loses his concentration, he is impossible to hit. His second skill comes from a lifetime of being bullied by his elder brother, Yoon is very good at taking a beating and not getting hurt. This is enough to convince Choi Myeong-seong, the target of the bullies attacks, to ask Yoon for additional training.

When it appears that Yoon's protege was able to single-handedly defeat all three bullies at the same time, Yoon's reputation as a teacher rises and he finds his class full of those wanting to learn from him, saving the team from being disbanded.

== Cast ==
- Im Ji-kyu as Yoon Do-hyeon
- Ahn Daniel as Choi Myeong-seong
- Han Yeo-reum as Won-seon
- Kim Hee-won as Kwang-hyeon
- Kim So-young as Han-na
- Yoon Park as Seok-ho
- Gi Ju-bong as Teacher Im
- Lee Chae-eun as Hyeon-jin
- Nam Tae-bo as Jeong Tae-ho
- Choi Min-soo as Do-hyeon's father
- Lee Dae-hoon as Rising star Do-hyeon

== Ratings ==
Episode #	Original broadcast date	Average audience share			
Episode #	Original broadcast date	TNmS Ratings		AGB Nielsen	
Episode #	Original broadcast date	Nationwide	Seoul National Capital Area	Nationwide	Seoul National Capital Area
1	7 October 2012	2.8%	3.2%	<8.5%	<7.4%

== Awards and nominations ==
Year	Award	Category	Recipient	Result
2012	KBS Drama Awards	Excellence Award, Actor in a One-Act/Special/Short Drama	Im Ji-kyu	Nominated
