= KBS Drama Special =

South Korean television anthology series

- Hangul: KBS 드라마 스페셜
- RR: KBS deurama seupesyeol
- MR: KBS tŭrama sŭp'esyŏl
- Genre: Drama
- Created by: KBS Drama Production
- Screenplay by: Various
- Directed by: Various
- Starring: Various
- Country of origin: South Korea
- Original language: Korean
- No. of seasons: 11
- No. of episodes: 181

Production
- Camera setup: Single camera
- Running time: 70 minutes
- Production companies: KBS Drama Production (until 2018); UFO Production (2019); Monster Union (2020–2021, 2024–2026); Ascendio Entertainment (2022–2023); DK E&M (2024); OH Story (2024); Jerrygood Company (2025); KeyEast (2026); Contents G (2026)

Original release
- Network: KBS2
- Release: May 15, 2010 – present

KBS Drama Special (Korean: KBS 드라마 스페셜; RR: KBS deurama seupesyeol) is a South Korean anthology series created and broadcast by KBS2, with each episode having a different story, cast, director and scriptwriter. The format is based on its predecessor Drama City and MBC's Best Theater.

Drama City ended its run in 2008 after 14 years. Since then, television series adapted from comic books or online novels have been rising to the mainstream, leaving even less space for short series to make a comeback. However, on May 15, 2010, KBS Drama Special was introduced in the form of a single-episode anthology series, starting with "Red Candy" by veteran scriptwriter Noh Hee-kyung.

For the 2020 and 2021 editions, Monster Union, the drama production subsidiary of KBS, has been producing Drama Special.

In 2021, KBS introduced a film project 'TV Cinema' in Drama Special. It was aired for the first time in October and includes 10 works, including four 90-minute TV cinemas and six 70-minute single-act plays.

In 2022, 10 films were released in November and December, starting with the theatrical release of two films, and followed by eight single-act films. All of these were produced by Ascendio Entertainment for KBS.

== Series overview ==
Season	Broadcasting period	Airtime	Ep.
—N/a	March 9 – May 18, 1997	Sunday at 22:00 (KST)	14
—N/a	May 25 – June 8, 1997	Sunday at 21:00 (KST)	14
1	May 15 – November 27, 2010	Saturday at 23:15 (KST)	24
2	June 5 – July 17, 2011	Sunday at 23:15 (KST)	23
2	July 24 – November 6, 2011	Sunday at 23:25 (KST)	23
2	November 13–27, 2011	Sunday at 23:30 (KST)	23
3	June 3 – December 23, 2012	Sunday at 23:45 (KST)	24
4	June 12 – October 23, 2013	Wednesday at 23:10 (KST)	18
4	November 11 – December 8, 2013	Sunday at 23:55 (KST)	18
5	January 26 – February 2, 2014	Sunday at 23:55 (KST)	27
5	February 23 – April 13, 2014	Sunday at 23:55 (KST)	27
5	May 11 – June 8, 2014	Sunday at 23:55 (KST)	27
5	September 14 – November 2, 2014	Sunday at 00:00 (KST)	27
5	November 9 – December 7, 2014	Sunday at 00:10 (KST)	27
6	March 13 – April 3, 2015	Friday at 21:30 (KST) (Two consecutive episodes)	15
6	July 31 – August 28, 2015	Friday at 22:50 (KST)	15
6	October 24 – November 28, 2015	Friday at 23:50 (KST)	15
7	September 25 – November 27, 2016	Sunday at 23:40 (KST)	10
8	September 3 – November 5, 2017	Sunday at 22:40 (KST)	10
9	September 14 – November 16, 2018	Friday at 22:00 to 23:10 (KST)	10
10	September 27 – November 29, 2019	Friday at 23:00 (KST)	10
11	November 7 – December 24, 2020	Saturday at 22:30 (KST)	10
12	October 22 – December 24, 2021	Saturday at 22:30 (KST)	10
13	November 16 – December 28, 2022	Wednesday and Thursday at 21:50 (KST)	10
14	October 14 – December 16, 2023	Saturday at 21:50 (KST)	10
15	November 5 – December 10, 2024	Tuesday at 22:45 (KST)	5
16 (Love : Track)	December 14–28, 2025	Wednesday at 21.50 (KST) and Sunday at 22.50 (KST)	10
Total number of episodes (Seasons 1–15)			230

== Episodes ==
=== Season 1 (2010) ===
No.	Title	Directed by	Written by	Original release date	Ratings (Note: AGB Nielsen ratings)
1	"Red Candy" (Korean: 빨강 사탕)	Hong Seok-gu	Noh Hee-kyung	May 15, 2010	5.0%
Cast: Park Si-yeon, Lee Jae-ryong, Kim Yeo-jin, Yook Dong-il.
2	"The Scary One, The Ghost and I" (Korean: 무서운 놈과 귀신과 나)	Kim Yong-soo	Park Yeon-seon	May 22, 2010	4.1%
Cast: Lee Won-jong, Park Ki-woong, Kim Min-ji, Yeon Ji-ho, Shin Chang-joo.
3	"Hot Coffee" (Korean: 끝내주는 커피)	Lee Jae-sang	Lee Sun-young	May 29, 2010	7.6%
Cast: Cho Yeon-woo, Yoon Hae-young, Moon Hee-kyung.
4	"Our Slightly Risky Relationship" (Korean: 조금 야한 우리 연애)	Kim Hyung-seok	Park Eun-young	June 5, 2010	6.6%
Cast: Lee Sun-kyun, Hwang Woo-seul-hye.
5	"The Woman Next Door" (Korean: 옆집 아줌마)	Hwang Eui-kyung	Kwon Gi-young	June 19, 2010	4.8%
Cast: Sunwoo Sun, Lee Tae-sung, Hong Wan-pyo, Jung Woo-hyuk.
6	"Reason" (Korean: 이유)	Jung Chang-geun	Park Hyung-jin	July 3, 2010	4.3%
Cast: Lee Bo-hee, Greena Park, Choi Jung-woo, Kim Na-woon.
7	"The Great Gye Chun-bin" (Korean: 위대한 계춘빈)	Lee Eung-bok	Yoon Ji-hee	July 10, 2010	4.8%
Cast: Jung Yu-mi, Jung Kyung-ho, Ahn Seo-hyun, Choi Yu-hwa, Choi Dae-hoon, Jo Hee-bong, Oh Na-mi.
8	"Secret Flower Garden" (Korean: 비밀의 화원)	Moon Joon-ha	Ha Moo-soo	July 17, 2010	3.9%
Cast: Baek Jin-hee, Cha Min-ji, Lee Dong-gyu.
9	"An Awful Lot of Coincidences" (Korean: 우연의 남발)	Noh Sang-hoon	Son Hwang-won	July 24, 2010	3.1%
Cast: Choi Deok-moon, Oh Yong, Song Jae-ryong, Myung Gye-nam.
10	"Spy Trader Kim Chul-soo's Recent Condition" (Korean: 남파 트레이더 김철수 씨의 근황)	Park Hyun-seok	Lee Myung-sook	July 31, 2010	3.8%
Cast: Qri, Oh Man-seok, Seo Hyun-chul, Lee Dae-yeon.
11	"The Angel of Death Comes With Purple High Heels" (Korean: 보라색 하이힐을 신고 저승사자가 온다)	Hong Seok-gu	Joo Hwa-mi	August 7, 2010	5.1%
Cast: Jeon Hye-bin, Jung Sung-hwa, Jeon Boram.
12	"Aridong's Last Cowboy" (Korean: 아리동 라스트 카우보이)	Kim Yong-soo	Park Jin-woo	August 14, 2010	4.0%
Cast: Yang Taek-jo, Kim Jin-tae, Bang Joong-hyun.
13	"Last Flashman" (Korean: 마지막 후뢰시맨)	Kim Jin-won	Yoon Ji-hee	August 21, 2010	4.2%
Cast: Park Yoo-sun, Kim Ji-young, Lee Sung-min, Lee Mi-young, Nam Bo-ra.
14	"Summer Story" (Korean: 여름이야기)	Yoon Sung-sik	Min Jung-soo	August 28, 2010	4.1%
Cast: Yeo Wook-hwan, Son Yeo-eun, Baek Eun-ah, Kim Kwang-kyu.
15	"Stone" (Korean: 돌멩이)	Kim Hyung-seok	Bang Ji-young	September 4, 2010	3.7%
Cast: Jung Han-yong, Lee Do-kyung, Kim Hye-ok, Yeo Min-joo, Lee In.
16	"I'm a Butterfly" (Korean: 나는 나비)	Hwang Wi-kyung	Lee Hyun-joo	September 11, 2010	4.5%
Cast: Kim Hee-won, Kim Sun-kyung, Choi Il-hwa, Ryu Sang-wook, Jo Sun-hyung.
17	"Boy Meets Girl" (Korean: 소년 소녀를 만나다)	Kim Young-gyoon	Park Eun-young	October 2, 2010	4.5%
Cast: Yoon Hee-seok, Kim Jung-nan, Kim Hyo-seo, Lee Mi-so, Seo Shin-ae.
18	"Cutting Off the Heart" (Korean: 마음을 자르다)	Jeon Chang-geun	Heo Sung-hye	October 9, 2010	4.2%
Cast: Moon Jeong-hee, Im Ji-kyu, Kim Na-woon, Seo Mi-ja.
19	"When the Opera Is Over" (Korean: 오페라가 끝나면)	Noh Sang-hoon	Park Eun-young	October 16, 2010	3.9%
Cast: Kim Kap-soo, Choi Won-young, Kim Bo-kyung.
20	"Texas Hit" (Korean: 텍사스 안타)	Park Hyun-seok	Han Sang-woon	October 23, 2010	4.6%
Cast: Son Hyun-joo, Yoo Gun, Kim Kwang-hyun, Jo Chang-geun, Song Ji-in, Jeon Ye-seo.
21	"A Family's Secret" (Korean: 가족의 비밀)	Kim Jung-min	Heo Sung-hye	October 30, 2010	3.9%
Cast: Lee Hee-do, Kim Mi-kyung, Yoon Se-ah, Jeon Ah-min, Yoon Joo-sang.
22	"Snail Study Dorm" (Korean: 달팽이 고시원)	Kim Jin-won	Yoon Ji-hee	November 6, 2010	4.0%
Cast: Lee Kyu-han, Seo Ji-hye, Kim Gyeol.
23	"Hurry Up and Tell Me" (Korean: 어서 말을 해)	Yoon Sung-sik	Lee Do-yeol	November 20, 2010	4.2%
Cast: Bae Soo-bin, Kim Gyu-ri, Bang Joong-hyun, Jeon Ye-seo.
24	"Pianist" (Korean: 피아니스트)	Moon Joon-ha	Park Eun-young	November 27, 2010	4.6%
Cast: Choi Min-ho, Han Ji-hye, Choi Phillip, Jo Hee-bong.

=== Season 2 (2011) ===
No.	Title	Directed by	Written by	Original release date	Ratings
1	"Young-deok Women's Wrestling Team" (Korean: 영덕 우먼스 씨름단)	Kim Hyung-seok	Park Run-young	June 5, 2011	5.5%
Cast: Lee Jong-hyuk, Lee Se-young, Jeon So-min.
2	"That Man Is There" (Korean: 그 남자가 거기 있다)	Noh Sang-hoon	Kwon Se-jin	June 12, 2011	3.6%
Cast: Kim Sung-eun, Kim Young-hoon, Choi Deok-moon, Kim Kyung-ik, Kim Jin-seong.
3	"Men Cry" (Korean: 남자가 운다)	Han Joon-seo	Jung Hyun-min	June 19, 2011	5.4%
Cast: Son Hyun-joo, Jo Mi-ryung, Lee Yong-woo.
4	"Princess Hwapyung's Weight Loss" (Korean: 화평공주 체중감량사)	Song Hyun-wook	Kim Eun-ryung	June 26, 2011	8.2%
Cast: Eugene, Ryu Seung-soo, Choi Dae-chul, Jo Hye-jin, Lee Won-jong.
5	"The 7th Day" (Korean: 제7요일)	Moon Young-jin	Ahn So-min	July 3, 2011	4.6%
Cast: Ko Eun-mi, Kim Min-sung, Kim Hye-jin, Kim Cheon-man.
6	"The Beeper" (Korean: 삐삐가 울린다)	Shin Hyun-soo	Park So-young	July 10, 2011	3.9%
Cast: Ahn Suk-hwan, Seo Tae-hwa, Ban Min-jung, Lee Jae-gwan, Kang Pil-seok.
7	"The Woman from the Olle Road" (Korean: 올레길 그 여자)	Jin Hyung-wook	Jung Hyun-min	July 17, 2011	5.1%
Cast: Park Jung-ah, Dokgo Young-jae, Go Se-won, Kim Min-hee, Lee Bo-hee.
8	"Linger" (Korean: 미련)	Kim Sang-hee	Kim Sun-duk	July 24, 2011	5.5%
Cast: Jang Shin-young, Lee Chun-hee, Yang Jin-woo, Hyun Woo-jong.
9	"Cupid Factory" (Korean: 큐피드 팩토리)	Kim Hyung-seok	Heo Sung-hye	July 31, 2011	3.5%
Cast: Park Soo-jin, Lee Hee-joon, Kim Woo-bin.
10	"Daughters of Bilitis Club" (Korean: 클럽 빌리티스의 딸들)	Han Joon-seo	Son Ji-hye	August 7, 2011	5.0%
Cast: Kim Hye-ok, Choi Ran, Han Go-eun, Oh Se-jung, Jin Se-yeon, Ahn Ji-hyun, Son Min-ji.
11	"Identical Criminals" (Korean: 동일범)	Mo Wan-il	Lee Do-yeol	August 21, 2011	5.8%
Cast: Lee Ji-hoon, Lee Sung-min, Lee Hee-joon, Seo Hyun-chul, Shin Da-eun, Baek Won-gil, Seo Ji-yeon.
12	"Our Happy Days of Youth" (Korean: 기쁜 우리 젊은 날)	Song Hyun-wook	Han Hee-jung	August 28, 2011	3.8%
Cast: Choi Sung-won, Yoo Da-in, Moon Hyuk, Baek Soo-ryun, Kyung Kyu-won, Kim Hwan-hee, Jo Sun-hyung, Park Myung-shin.
13	"Strawberry Ice Cream" (Korean: 딸기 아이스크림)	Ji Byung-hyun	Ha Moo-soo	September 18, 2011	4.5%
Cast: Uhm Hyun-kyung, Kim Young-hoon, Na Hyun-joo.
14	"Human Casino" (Korean: 휴먼 카지노)	Kim Sung-yoon	Heo Sung-ye	September 25, 2011	3.6%
Cast: Lee Jang-woo, Kim Jung-tae, Kim Min-seo, Park Jeong-min, Moon Cheon-sik, Lee Joong-gu, Bang Joon-hyun, Kim Dong-beom.
15	"Lethal Move" (Korean: 필살기)	Kim Sang-hwi	Ahn Hong-ran	October 2, 2011	4.3%
Cast: Im Won-hee, Jung Man-sik, Shin Da-eun, Kim Du-yool, Ahn Sung-heon.
16	"Terminal" (Korean: 터미널)	Jeon Woo-sung	Jung Yoon-jung	October 9, 2011	5.0%
Cast: Kim Sung-oh, Lee Yoon-ji, Yang Hee-kyung, Lee Won-jong.
17	"Guardian Angel Kim Young-goo" (Korean: 수호천사 김영구)	Kim Jin-won	Jung Hyun-min	October 16, 2011	4.1%
Cast: Lee Pil-mo, Song Ha-yoon, (Note: Credited as Kim Byul.) Hwang Young-hee, Choi Deok-moon, Park Jae-woong, Jung Kang-hee.
18	"Ji-hoon, Born in 1982" (Korean: 82년생 지훈이)	Song Hyun-wook	Seo Yoo-sun	October 23, 2011	4.1%
Cast: Heo Jung-min, Choi Yoon-so, Kim Seung-wook, Shin Hye-kyung, Lee Moon-soo, Tae Woong, Hwang Seung-eon.
19	"The Sound of My Wife Breathing" (Korean: 아내의 숨소리)	Shin Hyun-soo	Ahn Hong-ran	October 30, 2011	4.7%
Cast: Cho Yeon-woo, Choi Ja-hye, Jeon Ye-seo, Hwang Dong-joo.
20	"Behind the Scenes of the Seokyeong Sports Council Reform" (Korean: 서경시 체육회 구조조정 비하인드 스토리)	Ji Byung-hyun	Jung Hyun-min	November 6, 2011	3.5%
Cast: Park Won-sang, Kim Min-seo, Lee Hae-young.
21	"Duet" (Korean: 이중주)	Mo Wan-il	Kim Hye-jin	November 13, 2011	4.0%
Cast: Jun Sung-hwan, Shim Yi-young, Jung In-seo, Jo Jae-wan, Yoon Jin-ho, Choi Jong-ryool.
22	"Sorry I'm Late" (Korean: 늦어서 미안해)	Kim Sung-yoon	Kim Bo-yeon	November 20, 2011	4.8%
Cast: Yoon Joo-sang, Sung Byung-sook, Jung Soo-young.
23	"My Wife Disappeared" (Korean: 아내가 사라졌다)	Jeon Woo-sung	Han Sang-woon	November 27, 2011	5.9%
Cast: Jo Hee-bong, Lee Se-eun, Park Hee-jin, Kim Joon-bae, Yang Han-yeol, Kim Joo-yeop.

=== Season 3 (2012) ===
No.	Title	Directed by	Written by	Original release date	Ratings
1	"Swamp Ecology Report" (Korean: 습지생태 보고서)	Park Hyun-seok	Han Sang-woon	June 3, 2012	2.8%
Cast: Sung Joon, Kim Chang-hwan, Jung Young-ki, Lee Jae-won, Goo Jae-yee, Choi Tae-hwan, Son San.
2	"The Whereabouts of Noh Sook-ja" (Korean: 노숙자씨의 행방)	Jeon Woo-sung	Ahn Hong-ran	June 17, 2012	4.0%
Cast: Jo Sung-ha, Oh Yoon-ah, Jo Hee-bong, Park Hyo-jun, Sun Hak, Kim Seul-gi.
3	"Re-Memory" (Korean: 리메모리)	Kim Young-gyoon	Hwang Min-ah	June 24, 2012	3.1%
Cast: Cha Soo-yeon, Kim Tae-hoon, Kim Kyu-chul, Choi Mu-in, Lee Mi-so, Nam Dong-jin, Park Hyun-min.
4	"Do I Look Like a Pushover?" (Korean: 내가 우스워보여?)	Hwang In-hyuk	Ahn Hong-ran	July 1, 2012	3.7%
Cast: Lee Chun-hee, Park Sang-wook, Choi Yu-hwa, Shin Seung-hwan, Park Sun-woo, Go In-bum.
5	"Gate of Non-Duality" (Korean: 불이문)	Lee Won-wi	Kim Min-sook	July 8, 2012	3.9%
Cast: Jeon Ye-seo, Jung Ui-kap, Seo Kap-sook, Kim Chul-woong, Oh Young-soo, Lee Young-eun, Kim Woo-seok.
6	"Don't Worry, I'm a Ghost" (Korean: 걱정마세요, 귀신입니다)	Lee Eun-jin	Hwang Da-eun	July 15, 2012	3.9%
Cast: Bong Tae-gyu, Park Shin-hye, Lee Ha-yool, Park Seo-yeon.
7	"Butcher Barber" (Korean: 칼잡이 이발사)	Lee Jung-seop	Baek Hye-jung & Kim Shin-tae	July 22, 2012	4.0%
Cast: Park Sung-woong, Nam Gyu-ri, Choi Seung-kyung, Jo Dal-hwan, Lee Chul-min, Jo Jae-yoon.
8	"A Still Picture" (Korean: 스틸사진)	Kwon Kye-hong	Kim Sun-hee	August 19, 2012	3.8%
Cast: Namkoong Min, Moon Jeong-hee, Shim Yi-young, Park Hyuk-kwon, Nam Myung-ryul, Park Bo-gum, Kyung Soo-jin.
9	"My Prettiest Moments" (Korean: 내가 가장 예뻤을 때)	Baek Sang-hoon	Lee Hyun-joo	August 26, 2012	3.8%
Cast: Jeon Ye-seo, Lee Jong-suk, Song Young-kyu, Kim Soo-yeon.
10	"Glass Prison" (Korean: 유리감옥)	Lee Eung-bok	Baek Hye-jung	September 2, 2012	4.5%
Cast: Im Jung-eun, Jin Tae-hyun, Bae Seong-woo, Park Joong-sun, Son Byung-wook, Seo Yi-an.
11	"The Great Dipper" (Korean: 칠성호)	Lee Eung-bok	Baek Hye-jung	September 9, 2012	3.3%
Cast: Jung Woo, Park Hyo-joo, Kim Roi-ha, Jung Man-sik, Kim Su-hyeon, Jo Jae-yoon, Lee Jae-won, Min Kyung-jin.
12	"Art" (Korean: 아트)	Park Hyun-seok	Han Sang-woon	September 16, 2012	1.7%
Cast: Lee Bo-hee, Park Joon-geum, Uhm Tae-goo, Kim Ye-won, Kim Jong-soo, Baek Chan-gi, Kim Ji-sook, Park Jong-hwan.
13	"My Wife Natree's First Love" (Korean: 내 아내 네이트리의 첫사랑)	Jung Gil-young	Jo Soo-young	September 23, 2012	3.4%
Cast: Park Won-sang, Kim Ye-won, Kim Jung-hun, Kim Ji-young.
14	"Do You Know Taekwondo?" (Korean: 태권, 도를 아십니까)	Kim Young-gyoon	Yoo Bo-ra	October 7, 2012	3.2%
Cast: Im Ji-kyu, Ahn Daniel, Han Yeo-reum, Kim Hee-won, Kim So-young, Yoon Park, Gi Ju-bong, Lee Chae-eun, Choi Min-soo, Lee Dae-hoon, Yoo Jae-sang, Nam Tae-bo.
15	"A Corner" (Korean: 모퉁이)	Kim Young-jin	Lee Joo-yeon	October 14, 2012	3.9%
Cast: Kim Yong-rim, Yeon Joon-seok, Park Hyun-jung, Yoon Yoo-sun.
16	"A Culprit Among Friends" (Korean: 친구 중에 범인이 있다)	Noh Sang-hoon	Kwon Gi-young	October 21, 2012	4.3%
Cast: Go Jung-min, Shim Yi-young, Shin Dong-mi, Min Ji-ah, Kim Young-hoon, Choi Deok-moon, Kim Neul-mae.
17	"Daddy's Coming" (Korean: 아빠가 간다)	Kim Myung-wook	Baek Hye-jung	October 28, 2012	4.6%
Cast: Jo Hee-bong, Shin So-mi, Kim Jin-soo, Bang Joon-seo, Kim Hyun-bum, Lee Yoon-ae, Hyun Seok, Lee Jung-ho, Lee Mi-ji.
18	"A Spoonbill Flies Away" (Korean: 저어새, 날아가다)	Jeon San	Yoo Bo-ra	November 4, 2012	3.9%
Cast: Song Jong-ho, Kim Hye-jung, Kim Jung-nan, Oh Yong, Jung Eun-pyo, Lee Joo-seok.
19	"Return Home" (Korean: 환향-쥐불놀이)	Lee Won-ik	Choi Seo-hyun	November 11, 2012	3.8%
Cast: Won Ki-joon, Oh In-hye, Heo Yoon-jung, Bang Yoong-hyun, Joo Hee-joong, Kim Sae-byuk, Kim Ho-young, Jang Kyung-ah, Lee Bum-woo.
20	"Pandemonium" (Korean: 복마전)	Moon Young-jin	Kang Ji-hee	November 18, 2012	3.2%
Cast: Ahn Nae-sang, Choi Woo-suk, Heo Jae-ho, Jin Won, Yoo Jong-geun, Jung Won-joong, Yang Seung-geol, Kim Cheon-man, Yoon Son-hong, Sung Chan-ho, Kang Gi-sung, Lee Ki-young, Park Hee-eun, Son Ha-jung.
21	"The Ultimate Miracle" (Korean: 기적 같은 기적)	Lee Eun-jin	Sun Young	December 2, 2012	4.0%
Cast: Nam Sang-mi, Lee Chun-hee, Ra Kyung-deok, Lee Tae-woo, Lee Joo-shil, Gu Hye-rung, Kim Gi-cheon, Kim Seung-wook.
22	"Mellow In May" (Korean: 오월의 멜로)	Baek Sang-hoon	Hwang Min-ah	December 9, 2012	4.3%
Cast: Jo An, Ki Tae-young, Gi Ju-bong, Lee Mi-do, Jo Jae-wan, Yoo Son-chul, Bang Joong-hyun, Kim Geum-ah, Jeon Ye-seo, Jang Dae-woong.
23	"Sangkwoni (Business District)" (Korean: 상권이)	Kim Jin-woo	Yoo Bo-ra	December 16, 2012	6.1%
Cast: Lee Moon-sik, Choi Moo-sung, Joo Jin-mo, Yoo Hyung-gwan, Jung Min-sung, Joo Jin-mo, Kim Nam-jin, Kim In-seo, Choi Mu-in, Seo Jin-won.
24	"Another Wedding" (Korean: 또 한번의 웨딩)	Choi Ji-young	Lee Jae-in, Choi Ji-young & Jeon Chan-ho	December 23, 2012	4.9%
Cast: Hong Soo-hyun, Jin Yi-han, Mina Fujii, Kim Seul-gi, Kim Min-kyo, Choi Hee.

=== Season 4 (2013) ===
No.	Title	Directed by	Written by	Original release date	Ratings
1	"The Memory in My Old Wallet" (Korean: 내 낡은 지갑 속의 기억)	Lee Jung-seop	Chae Seung-dae	June 12, 2013	3.0%
Cast: Ryu Soo-young, Nam Bo-ra, Yoo In-young.
2	"My Friend Is Still Alive" (Korean: 내 친구는 아직 살아있다)	Lee Eung-bok	Go Jung-won	June 19, 2013	3.1%
Cast: Lee Gi-kwang, Lee Joo-seung, Jeon Soo-jin, Kim Chang-hwan, Kim Ye-ryeong.
3	"Family Bandage" (Korean: 유리 반창고)	Kim Young-jin	Lee Joo-yeon	June 26, 2013	2.9%
Cast: Park Sang-myun, Lee Hye-in, Yoon Yoo-sun, Kim Dong-hyeon.
4	"Neighborhood Watch" (Korean: 불침번을 서라)	Lee Deok-geon	Jung Ji-eun	August 7, 2013	4.1%
Cast: Ki Tae-young, Kim Min-joo, Kim Yoo-hyun, Kwak Hee-sung, Lee Eun-ha, Kim Dae-hee, Shin Min-chul.
5	"Happy Rose Day" (Korean: Happy! 로즈데이)	Kim Young-jo	Kim Min-jung	August 14, 2013	3.6%
Cast: Kim Do-hyun, So Yoo-jin, Jung Woong-in, Ahn So-hee, Jang Do-yoon, Kim Mi-rim.
6	"The Strange Cohabitation" (Korean: 기묘한 동거)	Lee Jung-seop	Lee Ji-hyo	August 21, 2013	3.3%
Cast: Park Sung-woong, Yoo In-young, Lee Si-eon, Choo So-young, Lee Hwa, Hwang Young-hee, Yoon In-jo, Moon Se-yoon.
7	"The Mother's Island" (Korean: 엄마의 섬)	Song Hyun-wook	Yoo Byung-woo	August 28, 2013	3.8%
Cast: Kim Yong-rim, Nam Sung-jin, Yu Oh-seong, Hong Kyung-in, Jung Ji-ah, Lee Sang-ha, Lee In-hye, Kim Ji-young.
8	"Yeon-woo's Summer" (Korean: 연우의 여름)	Lee Na-jeong	Yoo Bo-ra	September 4, 2013	2.8%
Cast: Han Ye-ri, Im Se-mi, Han Joo-wan, Kim Hye-ok, Hwang Jung-min, Jung Soo-young, Jung In-gi, Kim Young-ok, Park Myung-hoon.
9	"Na-ra's Rain" (Korean: 비의 나라)	Ahn Joon-yong	Lee Ah-ram	October 2, 2013	3.4%
Cast: Jung Eun-chae, Yoo Min-kyu, Choi Jae-woong, Yoo Se-hyung, Byun Joon-seok.
10	"Your Noir" (Korean: 당신의 누아르)	Lee So-yeon	Kim Wook	October 9, 2013	4.0%
Cast: Hwang Chan-sung, Chae Jung-an, Hong Kyung-in, Kim Jong-soo, Min Sung-wook.
11	"Chagall's Birthday" (Korean: 그렇고 그런 사이)	Han Sang-woo	Hong Jung-hee	October 16, 2013	4.1%
Cast: Ye Ji-won, Song Ha-yoon, Cho Yeon-woo, Lee Young-yoo, Choi Sung-min.
12	"The Devil Rider" (Korean: 마귀)	Park Hyun-seok	Chae Sung-dae	October 23, 2013	4.4%
Cast: Yu Oh-seong, Lee Dae-yeon, Kim Young-jae, Lee Chae-young, Ahn Ji-hyun, Jung Soo-young, Park Soo-young, Uhm Tae-goo, Won Woong-jae.
13	"Came to Me and Became a Star" (Korean: 나에게로 와서 별이 되었다)	Hwang In-hyuk	Kim Min-jung	November 3, 2013	3.4%
Cast: Kim Ji-seok, Jung So-min, Lee Byung-joon, Yoo So-young, Nam Kyung-min, Kim Dong-hee.
14	"Eun-guk and the Ugly Duckling" (Korean: 오빠와 미운 오리)	Shin Hyun-soo	Choi Ha-nee	November 10, 2013	2.8%
Cast: Lee Si-eon, Jung Ji-so, Moon Hee-kyung, Park Joon-mok, Oh Shin-ha.
15	"The Unwelcome Guest" (Korean: 불청객)	Noh Sang-hoon	Lee Eun-mi	November 17, 2013	2.7%
Cast: Kang Shin-il, Park Joo-hyung, Uhm Hyun-kyung, Yoo Hyung-gwan, Heo Sung-tae, Son Woo-hyuk.
16	"My Dad Is a Nude Model" (Korean: 아빠는 변태중)	Kim Sung-yoon	Kim Bo-yeon	November 24, 2013	3.6%
Cast: Sung Ji-ru, Bang Eun-hee, Bae Noo-ri, Han Groo, Jo Hee-bong, Park Woo-cheon.
17	"Outlasting Happiness" (Korean: 끈질긴 기쁨)	Kim Jong-yeon	Jang Myung-woo	December 1, 2013	4.0%
Cast: Ryu Hyun-kyung, Jung Eun-woo, Lee Joo-seung, Jin Kyung, Song Min-ji, Heo Jung-min, Heo Joon-seok.
18	"Jin Jin" (Korean: 진진)	Cha Young-hoon	Kim Ji-woo	December 8, 2013	2.8%
Cast: Yoon Jin-seo, Shin So-yul, Kim Da-hyun, Lee Si-eon, Kim Min-sang, Han Gi-woong.

=== Season 5 (2014) ===
No.	Title	Directed by	Written by	Original release date	Ratings
1	"Curry" (Korean: 카레의 맛)	Han Sang-woo	Hong Jung-hee	January 26, 2014	3.9%
Cast: Jeon Hye-bin, Hyun Woo, Oh Mi-hee, Jung Won-kyu, Lee Mae-ri, Woo Hyun, Lee Joo-woo.
2	"First Birthday" (Korean: 돌날)	Kim Young-jo	Seo Yoo-sun	February 2, 2014	3.2%
Cast: Kim Ji-young, Go Young-bin, Seo Yoo-jung, Kim Gi-yeon, Park Joon-myun, Seo Hyun-chul, Kim Do-hyun, Jung Wi-kap, Ahn Shin-woo.
3	"Playing Games" (Korean: 들었다 놨다)	Lee Jung-seop	Yoo Mi-kyung	February 23, 2014	5.1%
Cast: Kim C, Woo Hee-jin, Shin So-yul, Park Joon-hyuk.
4	"You're Pretty, Oh Man-bok" (Korean: 예쁘다 오만복)	Hwang In-hyuk	Kim Mi-hee	March 2, 2014	2.6%
Cast: Kim Hyang-gi, Park Chul-min, Ra Mi-ran, Na Hae-ryung, Shin Dong-woo, Park Isaiah, Lee Gi-chan, Yoon Sun-woo, Roh Jeong-eui, Kim Hyun-bin, Kim Ji-eun.
5	"The Dirge Singer" (Korean: 곡비)	Lee Eun-jin	Heo Ji-young	March 9, 2014	3.8%
Cast: Kim You-jung, Seo Jun-young, Hwang Mi-sun, Im Ji-eun, Yoon Da-gyeong, Ahn Ji-hyun, Ahn Byung-kyung, Kim Ji-an, Lee Do-yeon, Son Woo-hyuk.
6	"I'm Dying Soon" (Korean: 나 곧 죽어)	Noh Sang-hoon	Yoo Soo-hoon	March 16, 2014	2.8%
Cast: Oh Jung-se, Kim Seul-gi, Kim Ji-hyun, Jo Hyun-sik, Lee So-yoon, Choi Deok-moon, Yoo Hyung-kwan, Choi Dae-hoon.
7	"The Reason I'm Getting Married" (Korean: 내가 결혼하는 이유)	Kim Sung-yoon	Kim Eun-ji	March 23, 2014	4.1%
Cast: Park Hee-von, Song Jong-ho, Hong Jong-hyun, Yoon Joo-sang, Sung Byung-sook, Kim Ji-won.
8	"Monster" (Korean: 괴물)	Kim Jong-yeon	Park Pil-joo	March 30, 2014	4.1%
Cast: Yeon Joon-seok, Kang Sung-min, Park Byung-eun, Kim Jong-soo, Kim Hee-jin, Shin Moon-sung.
9	"Middle School Student A" (Korean: 중학생 A양)	Baek Sang-hoon	Kim Hyuk-jung	April 6, 2014	2.9%
Cast: Lee Yul-eum, Kwak Dong-yeon, Lee Han-na, Kim Bum-joon, Jung Jae-eun, Go Yoon-hoo.
10	"That Kind of Love" (Korean: 그런 사랑)	Cha Young-hoon	Lee Joo-yeon	April 13, 2014	2.5%
Cast: Bae Soo-bin, Lee Yoon-ji, Choi Min-chul, Jung Kyu-soo.
11	"Youth" (Korean: 18세)	Kim Jin-woo	Yoo Bo-ra	May 15, 2014	2.3%
Cast: Seo Young-joo, Kim Heung-soo, Uhm Tae-goo, Lee Ji-oh, Choi Min, Choi Moo-sung, Park Myung-hoon.
12	"Illegal Parking" (Korean: 부정주차)	Park Jin-seok	Lee Min-young	May 18, 2014	2.6%
Cast: On Joo-wan, Kim Sang-ho, Jang Joon-woo, Jo Jae-yoon, Kim Sa-kwon, Ha Jae-sook, Ko Kyu-pil, Yoo Jae-myung.
13	"The Dreamer" (Korean: 꿈꾸는 남자)	Lee Eung-bok	Yoo Jung-hee	May 25, 2014	2.8%
Cast: Yang Jin-woo, Yoon Se-ah, Mi Ram, Lee Seung-joon.
14	"Pitch-Black Darkness" (Korean: 칠흑)	Park Gi-ho	Kim Mi-jung	June 1, 2014	2.3%
Cast: Danny Ahn, Kwak Jung-wook, Kim Sun-kyung, Song Ji-yoo, Jo Si-nae, Kwak In-joon, Kang Eui-sik, Yoo Se-hyung, Jo Mo-se, Nam Tae-bo, Lee Young-eun, Jung Min-sung.
15	"Bomi's Room" (Korean: 보미의 방)	Kim Sang-hwi	Lee Ha-na	June 8, 2014	2.1%
Cast: Ahn Seo-hyun, Lee Young-ah, Shim Hyung-tak, Park Hae-mi, Jung Joon-won, Jang Dae-woong, Seo Kang-joon (cameo), Gong Myung (cameo).
16	"The End of That Summer" (Korean: 그 여름의 끝)	Kim Young-jin	Soo Yeon	September 14, 2014	3.2%
Cast: Jo Eun-sook, Jun Jin-seo, Lee Kwang-ki, Lee Ga-hyun, Park Hyun-jung.
17	"The Three Female Runaways" (Korean: 세 여자 가출소동)	Lee Min-hong	Choi Hye-chul	September 21, 2014	3.5%
Cast: Seo Yea-ji, Park Hae-mi, Jang Hee-jin, Jo Young-jin, Choi Joon-yong, Lee Han-wi, Kim Jung-hak, Hong Seung-jin, Lee Woo-min, Lee Han-jong.
18	"We All Cry Differently" (Korean: 다르게 운다)	Lee Eung-bok	Lee Kang	October 5, 2014	2.5%
Cast: Kim So-hyun, Son Seung-won, Kim Hee-jung, Um Hyo-sup, Jung In-seo.
19	"Suspicious Ward No. 7" (Korean: 수상한 7병동)	Lee Min-jung	Choi Yong-wook	October 12, 2014	2.4%
Cast: Shin Yi, Kim Jung-min, Lee Byung-joon, Shim Eun-jin, Kim Ho-chang, Song Chae-han.
20	"The Tale of the Bookworm" (Korean: 간서치 열전)	Park Jin-seok	Lee Min-young	October 19, 2014	2.7%
Cast: Han Joo-wan, Min Ji-ah, Jung Eun-woo, Choi Dae-chul, Ahn Nae-sang, Lee Dae-yeon, Im Ho, Gil Hae-yeon.
21	"Repulsive Love" (Korean: 추한 사랑)	Ahn Joon-yong	Lee Seung-hyun & Seo Yoo-sun	October 26, 2014	2.7%
Cast: Jo Dal-hwan, Goo Jae-yee, Kim Young-hoon, Song Min-ji, Park Chul-min, Seo Dong-gap, Jung Young-gi, Kim Sun-ha, Oh Hee-joong.
22	"The Final Puzzle" (Korean: 마지막 퍼즐)	Kim Jung-hyun	Lee Jung-sun	November 2, 2014	2.9%
Cast: Yoon Tae-young, Jung Ji-yoon, Kim Min-sang, Kim Min-jae, Yeom Dong-hun, Lee Ah-hyun, Choi Dae-chul, Park Hyuk-min.
23	"The Girl Who Became a Photo" (Korean: 액자가 된 소녀)	Yoo Jong-sun	Lee Kang	November 9, 2014	1.6%
Cast: Choi Jong-won, Jung In-sun, Lee Jae-kyoon, Jin Kyung, Jung In-gi, Lee Se-eun, Gong Yoon-chan.
24	"Vengeful Spirit" (Korean: 원혼)	Lee Jae-hoon	Park Jae-bum	November 16, 2014	1.4%
Cast: Ahn Jae-mo, Park Eun-hye, Mi Ram, Yang Joon-mo, Kim Chang-hwan, Kim Joo-hwan.
25	"The Reason I Get Drunk" (Korean: 내가 술을 마시는 이유)	Jeon Woo-sung	Hong Eun-ae	November 23, 2014	1.8%
Cast: Ahn Suk-hwan, Oh Young-shil, Lee Cho-hee, Kim Hyun-joon, Kim Joon-bae, Kim Sang-won, Lee Jin-kwon.
26	"I Introduce My Father" (Korean: 아빠를 소개합니다)	Kim Young-kyoon	Yoo Jung-hee	November 30, 2014	2.2%
Cast: Song Ha-yoon, Moon Ji-yoon, Kim Min-sung, Gu Won.
27	"Bride in Sneakers" (Korean: 운동화를 신은 신부)	Lee Eun-jin	Yoo Jung-hee	December 7, 2014	2.2%
Cast: Lee Chung-ah, Kim Jin-woo, Lee Yi-kyung, Shin Bo-ra, Yoo So-young, Lee Min, Kim Jae-heung, Park Young-seo, Choi Jang-won, Jang Ji-sun, Go Eun-sung, Lee Seo-joon, Jin Young-bum, Kim Seung-hoon, Yoo Gun, Kim Sa-hee, Han Ji-sun.

=== Season 6 (2015) ===
No.	Title	Directed by	Written by	Original release date	Ratings
1	"Stay Still" (Korean: 가만히 있으라)	Kim Jong-yeon	Son Se-rim	March 13, 2015	3.7% (Part 1); 1.8% (Part 2)
Cast: Lee Moon-sik, Lee Joo-seung, Chae Bin, Park Gun-woo, Jo Duk-hyun, Gi Ju-bong, Kim Min-sang, Heo Joon-seok, Park Sun-woo, Lee Chul-min, Shin Moon-sung.
2	"The Wind Blows to the Hope" (Korean: 바람은 소망하는 곳으로 분다)	Kim Jong-soo	Hong Soon-mok	March 20, 2015	5.2% (Part 1); 4.1% (Part 2)
Cast: Kim Young-chul, Defconn, Choi Sung-won, Lee Won-jong, Seo Hyun-chul, Lee Yeong-hoon, Jung Jin, Lim Hyun-sung, Kim Gi-cheon, Park Gil-soo, Lim Yoon-ho, Lee Gyu-seop.
3	"Hair Day" (Korean: 머리심는 날)	Yoo Jong-sun	Baek Eun-kyung	March 27, 2015	3.6%
Cast: Choi Tae-hwan, Ha Eun-sul, Jang Sung-bum, Lee Han-wi, Yoon Ye-hee, Ji Dae-han, Lee Kan-hee, Kim Neul-me, Kim Chu-wol, Jeon Hyun-tae, Son Sun-geun, Lee Yoon-sang, Lee Jin-mok, Park Dae-gi, Song Young-hak.
4	"Funny Woman" (Korean: 웃기는 여자)	Kim Hyung-seok	Lee Jung-min	April 3, 2015	4.5% (Part 1); 2.9% (Part 2)
Cast: Moon Ji-in, Kim Ji-hoon, Lee Do-yeon, Hong Yoon-hwa, Im Do-yoon, Jung Yoon-min, Son Seong-yoon, Lee Sang-joon, Lee Ah-rin.
5	"What Is the Ghost Up To?" (Korean: 귀신은 뭐하나)	Cha Young-hoon	Son Se-rim	July 31, 2015	3.2%
Cast: Lee Joon, Cho Soo-hyang, Oh Sang-jin, Lee Yong-nyeo, Yang Jo-ah, So Hee-jung, Ryu Tae-ho, Lee Yoon-sang, Lee Won-jong.
6	"Crimson Moon" (Korean: 붉은 달)	Bae Kyung-soo	Yoo Young-seok	August 7, 2015	3.6%
Cast: Kim Dae-myung, Lee Hang-na, Park So-dam, Park Ha-na, Kim Myung-gon, Jo Mi-ryung, Ahn Ji-hyun, Kim Jong-hyun, Nam Hyun-joo, Jung Doo-gyeom, Yoon Yi-joon, Kim Hyun-bin.
7	"Live Shock" (Korean: 라이브 쇼크)	Kim Dong-hee	Kim Mi-jung & Kim Hyo-jin	August 14, 2015	3.3%
Cast: Baek Sung-hyun, Kim Ji-young, Yeo Min-joo, Jing Se-hyun, Kim Jong-soo, Lee Seung-hyung, Kim Tae-han, Jung Doo-gyeom, Han Suk-joon, Hwang Jin-woo, Lee Ye-jin, Lee Won-jin.
8	"In Search of Argenta" (Korean: 알젠타를 찾아서)	Kim Jung-hyun	Lee Min-jae	August 21, 2015	1.3%
Cast: Lee Soo-kyung, Kim Hee-jung, Hwang Se-on, Lee Jae-yong, Lee Hyun-gyeom, Choi Woong, Kim Min-sang, Kim Min-jae, Choi Ye-eun, Oh Eon-jong.
9	"The Brothers' Summer" (Korean: 그 형제의 여름)	Lee Jung-mi	Jung Ji-eun	August 28, 2015	2.9%
Cast: Choi Kwon-soo, Park Isaiah, Yu Oh-seong, Ahn Mi-na, Jo Jung-chi, Kim Su-yeon, Jung Won, Lim Tae-hwan, Baek Si-on, Heo In-young, Lee Jae-wook, Choi Seung-kyung, Kang Doo.
10	"Fake Family" (Korean: 짝퉁 패밀리)	Ahn Joon-yong	Son Se-rim	October 24, 2015	2.1%
Cast: Lee Ha-na, Lee Hak-joo, Park Jong-hwan, Gil Hae-yeon, Kim Won-hae, Jo Dal-hwan.
11	"Trains Don't Stop at Noryangjin Station" (Korean: 노량진역에는 기차가 서지 않는다)	Lee Jae-hoon	Kim Yang-gi	October 31, 2015	1.6%
Cast: Bong Tae-gyu, Ha Seung-ri, Kim Jung-woon, Han Sung-shik, Jung Jin-gap, Sung Byung-sook, Lee Sang-gu, Dong Hyun-bae, Jeon Hun-tae, Joo Boo-jin, Chae Min-hee, Kim Chang-hwan, Seo Dong-jin, Jo Min-hye, Kim Ji-hoon.
12	"Strange Fairy Tale" (Korean: 낯선 동화)	Park Jin-seok	Shin Soo-rim	November 7, 2015	2.3%
Cast: Kim Jung-tae, Jung Yoon-seok, Gil Jung-woo, Jung Hee-tae, Park Min-soo, Yoo Joon-hong, Ji Soo-won, Kang Moon-kyung, Lee Sang-hwa, Han Dong-kyu, Kim Yong-jin, Choi Ho-joong, Kim Min-sung, Kim Ji-won.
13	"Secret" (Korean: 비밀)	Jeon Woo-sung	Cha Yeon-joo	November 14, 2015	2.6%
Cast: Seo Eun-ah, Kim Joon-bae, Heo Ji-won, Jo Hee-bong, Lee Ik-joon, Baek Seung-chul, Son Young-soon, Yoon Byung-hee, Kim Do-young, Lee Ye-rin, Kim Sang-il, Choi Hyun-joon, Park Ye-chan.
14	"Avici" (Korean: 아비)	Kim Shin-il	Yoo Jung-hee	November 21, 2015	3.7%
Cast: Shin Eun-jung, Kwak Dong-yeon, Kim Kyu-chul, Choi Joon-yong, Go Bo-gyeol, Ban Min-jung, Hong Jin-gi.
15	"Contract Man" (Korean: 계약의 사내)	Lim Se-joon	Lim Ye-jin	November 28, 2015	1.5%
Cast: Choi Myung-gil, Oh Jung-se, Oh Eui-shik, Park Hye-jin, Choi Hong-il, Park Ji-a, Lee Hoon-jin, Lee Bon-kyu, Oh Hee-joon, Nam Moon-chul, Gong Ho-seok, Lee Kang-wook, Jeon Hoon-gi.

=== Season 7 (2016) ===
No.	Title	Directed by	Written by	Original release date	Ratings
1	"The Red Teacher" (Korean: 빨간 선생님)	Yoo Jong-sun	Kwon Hye-ji	September 25, 2016	2.4%
Cast: Lee Dong-hwi, Jung So-min, Lee Chae-eun, Jo Young-jin, Jeon Soo-ji, Lee Jae-kyoon, Lee Min-young, Park Se-wan, Lee Yoo-joon, Park Hoon, Kim Min-seok, Min Ji-hong.
2	"The Legendary Lackey" (Korean: 전설의 셔틀)	Kim Dong-hwa	Lim So-yeon	October 2, 2016	3.1%
Cast: Lee Ji-hoon, Kim Jin-woo, Seo Ji-hoon, Choi Sung-min, Han Jae-seok, Kim Joon-pyo, Son Dong-hwa, Jung Ji-hwan, Shim Jae-ho, Moon Yong-il, Lee Sung-deuk, Yu Oh-seong (cameo), Jun Hyun-moo (cameo), Ryu Dam (cameo), Yoo Min-sang (cameo).
3	"Summer Dream" (Korean: 한 여름의 꿈)	Jo Woong	Son Se-rin	October 9, 2016	2.9%
Cast: Kim Hee-won, Kim Ga-eun, Kim Bo-min, Lee Seo-hwan, Yoo Joo-won, Lee Kang-wook, Park Hye-jin, Yang Hyun-min, Lee Ta, Wook Joo-ri, Ryu Seung-soo (cameo), Kim Hyun-sook (cameo).
4	"My Happy Home" (Korean: 즐거운 나의 집)	Choi Yoon-seok	Choi Yoon-seok	October 16, 2016	3.3%
Cast: Son Yeo-eun, Lee Sang-yeob, Park Ha-na, Kim Myung-soo, Lee Il-hwa, Im Ji-kyu, Seo Dong-jin, Song Yoon-ah (cameo), Jung Hee-tae (cameo), Ok Taec-yeon (cameo).
5	"Twenty Dollars to Pyeongyang" (Korean: 평양까지 이만원)	Kim Young-kyoon	Kim Seung-won	October 23, 2016	2.2%
Cast: Han Joo-wan, Kim Young-jae, Mi Ram, Seo Jin-won, Seo Min-woo, Kim Hyo-jin, Woo Sang-jeon, Choi Jong-ryul, Lee Yong-nyeo, Choi Hyo-sang, Kwon Hong-seok, Seo Kwang-jae, Lee Mi-sook, Choi Gyu-sik, Heo Sung-tae, Myung Jae-hwan, Kang Hee-joong, Kim Yong-hwan, Kim Ki-hyeon, Lee Na-young, Seo In-kwon.
6	"Explicit Innocence" (Korean: 동정 없는 세상)	Kim Dong-hwa	Yoo Jung-hee	October 30, 2016	2.0%
Cast: Lee Joo-seung, Kang Min-ah, Yoon Yoo-sun, Min Sung-wook, Jang Yoo-sang, Kim Woo-hyuk, Lee Kang-wook, Song Sam-dong, Shin Dong-hoon, Kim Yoon-joo, Yoon Bo-jin, Kim Yi-an, Joo Soo-jin, Yoon Hee-kyung, Oh Han-gyul, Park Chul-min (cameo), Jung Yi-rang (cameo).
7	"Noodle House Girl" (Korean: 국시집 여자)	Kim Min-kyung	Kim Jung-joo	November 6, 2016	2.1%
Cast: Park Byung-eun, Jeon Hye-bin, Oh Dae-hwan, Shim Yi-young, Lee Jung-eun, Yoo Son-woong, Lee Yoo-joon, Jung Ji-ho, Kim Jae-chul, Han Tae-il, Yoo Byung-sun, Kim Geu-rim, Ma Min-hee, Kim Tae-woo (cameo).
8	"Disqualify Laughter" (Korean: 웃음실격)	Ahn Joon-yong	Jung Chan-mi & Gi Seung-tae	November 13, 2016	1.9%
Cast: Jo Dal-hwan, Ryu Hwa-young, Park Chul-min, Lee Hak-joo, Gu Ji-eun, Ryu Tae-ho, Kim Sun-ha, Lee Gap-sun, Lee Yoo-joon, Shin Yoo-joo, Oh Hee-joon, Park Kyung-hye, Kwon Oh-kyung, Noh Kang-min, Kim Hyun-jung, Cha Ji-won, Song Young-jae (cameo), Kim Won-hae (cameo), Kim Chang-han (cameo), Hwang Bo-ra (cameo), Lee Kwang-yong (cameo), Kim Yoon-ji (cameo), Lee Se-ra (cameo), Jung Hyun-seok (cameo), Lee Seung-hyun (cameo).
9	"A Dance from Afar" (Korean: 아득히 먼 춤)	Lim Se-joon	Lee Kang	November 20, 2016	1.3%
Cast: Lee Sang-hee, Koo Kyo-hwan, Cha Soo-yeon, Jung Young-gi, Jang Seo-kyung, Woo Ji-hyun, Lee Joon-young, Nam Myung-ryul, Son Min-seok, Kim Seung-hoon, Lee Young-seok, Yoon Son-shim, Lee Jae-hee, Kim Hyun, Kang Jin-ah, Choi Dae-seok, Lee Dong-yong, Hwang Woo-sang, Lee Jae-moon, Lee Ba-da, Shin Chi-young.
10	"Pinocchio's Nose" (Korean: 피노키오의 코)	Lee Jung-mi	Kim Seung-won	November 27, 2016	2.8%
Cast: Lee Yu-ri, Lee Ha-yool, Park Chan-han, Mi Ram, Kim Ye-ryeong, Kim Do-young, Kwon Hyuk, Lee Jae-wook, Park Geon-rak, Heo In-young, Han So-jung, Jang Joon-young, Kim Jung-woo, Jung Hyun-seok, Lee Ho-yeol, Kim Hyung-joon, Lee Hyun-woong, Park Soo-min, Kim Sa-hoon, Kim Sang-chul, Kim Ji-young, Lee Go-eun, Kim Bo-min, Lee Gap-kyung, King Seung-ha, Hwang Jung-ho.

=== Season 8 (2017) ===
No.	Title	Directed by	Written by	Original release date	Ratings
1	"If We Were a Season" (Korean: 우리가 계절이라면)	Kang Soo-yeon	Lim Ye-jin	September 3, 2017	4.1%
Cast: Chae Soo-bin, Jang Dong-yoon, Jung Jin-young, Lee Jun-hyeok, Jung In-gi, Nam Gi-ae, Ahn Seung-gyun, Kim Min-kyoo, Lee Hyun-jin, Yoon Da-gyeong, Lee Yoon-sang, Son Kang-kook, Yoo Ji-hyun, Lee Shi-won, Kim Yoo-na, Hwang Joon-woo, Kim Bo-min, Lee Shi-hoon.
2	"Let Us Meet" (Korean: 만나게 해, 주오 – feat. 경성혼인 정보회사)	Kang Min-kyung	Kim Eun-sun	September 10, 2017	4.5%
Cast: Son Ho-jun, Jo Bo-ah, Baek Soo-jang, Jung Yi-rang, Jo Jae-ryong, Choi Byung-mo, Jeon Bae-soo, Choi Da-in, Song Young-jae, Kwon Soo-hyun, Jo Yeon-ho, Hong Hyun-hee (cameo), Kang Hui (cameo).
3	"You Are Closer Than I Think" (Korean: 당신은 생각보다 가까이에 있다)	Choi Yoon-seok	Choi Mi-kyung	September 17, 2017	2.5%
Cast: Lee Sang-yeob, Kim So-eun, Lim Hwa-young, Kwak Hee-sung, Dong Ha, Kim Young-hee, Bang Ji-young, Kim Won-hae (cameo), Namkoong Min (cameo), Ok Taec-yeon (cameo).
4	"Dancing the Waltz Alone" (Korean: 혼자 추는 왈츠)	Hwang Seung-ki	Kwon Hye-jin	September 24, 2017	3.3%
Cast: Moon Ga-young, Yeo Hoe-hyun, Ha Ji-eun, Jo In-woo, Moon Ho-jin, Hyun Jin-soo, Kim Myung-sun, Kim Hyo-myung, Choi Woo-young, Han Dae-kwan, Oh Ji-yeon, Lee Da-hye, Shin Yul-yi, Nam Seung-woo, Jang Hye-min, Kim Joo-young, Choi Na-moo, Park Hye-jin, Han Jae-woong, Lim Shi-woo, Jin Joo-yeon, Kim Jin-joo, Ji Seo-ah.
5	"Madame Jung's One Last Week" (Korean: 정마담의 마지막 일주일)	Kang Min-kyung	Kim Se-rang	October 4, 2017	3.7%
Cast: Ra Mi-ran, Shin Rin-ah, Park Jung-hak, Lee Bong-ryun, Yoon Kyung-ho, Joo Seok-tae, Choi Hee-jin, Won Hyun-joon, Bae Jung-hwa, Park Se-wan, Jo Young-sun, Song Ha-rim, Kim Do-hye, Kim Ha-yoo, Song Young-jae (cameo).
6	"Kang Duk-soon's Love History" (Korean: 강덕순 애정 변천사)	Hwang Seung-ki	Baek So-yeon	October 5, 2017	2.9%
Cast: Kim So-hye, Oh Seung-yoon, Park Seo-yeon, Park Gyu-young, Shim Young-eun, Kim Yeo-jin, Baek Hyun-joo, Hong Sung-duk, Seo Jin-won (cameo), Han Ga-rim (cameo).
7	"A Bad Family" (Korean: 나쁜 가족들)	Kim Min-kyung	Kwon Hye-ji	October 15, 2017	3.6%
Cast: Shin Eun-kyung, Lee Joon-hyuk, Hong Seo-young, Song Ji-ho, Baek Soo-ryun, Park Sung-hoon, Jang Dong-joo, Kim Wang-geun, Kim Soo-min, Park Young-soo, Jung Wi-son, Jang Joo-yeon, Shin Yoon-jung, Cha Myung-wook, Gong Min-jeung, Jang Kyuk-soo, Kim Jin-mo, Seo Wang-seok, Kim Yong-jin, Wook Joo-ri, Park Mi-na.
8	"The Reason We Can't Sleep" (Korean: 우리가 못자는 이유)	Kang Soo-yeon	Baek So-yeon	October 22, 2017	4.0%
Cast: Im Ji-kyu, Im Se-mi, Lee Dae-yeon, Hwang Young-hee, Kim Gang-hyun, Ryu Ah-bel, Kim Se-ah, Kim Hyo-sook, Kim Hee-chang, Kim You-jung, Jung Ji-ho, Cha Jong-ho, Lee Sae-ro-mi, Jo Ji-seung.
9	"SLOW" (Korean: 슬로우)	Lim Se-joon	Kim Joo-man	October 29, 2017	1.7%
Cast: Kwak Dong-yeon, Jung Soo-ji, Ki Do-hoon, Nam Tae-bo, Choi Kwang-il, Lee Won-seop, Park Jong-hyun, Go Gil-joo, Heo Goo-yeon (cameo), Cho Sung-hwan (cameo).
10	"The Love of a Buzz Cut" (Korean: 까까머리의 연애)	Jo Woong	Lee Jin-seok	November 5, 2017	2.1%
Cast: Kang Yeon-jung, Kim Jung-hyun, Min Jin-woong, Lee Jung-eun, Oh Na-ra, Lee Seo-hwan, Park Gyu-young, Shin Duk-ho, Kim Mi-kyung, Kim Bo-jung, Kim Joong-don, Yoo Son-woong, Lee Kang-wook, Lim Jae-geun, Lee Kyu-hee, Oh Seung-hee, Ji Sung-geun, Kim Song, Jung Hyun-seok, Lee Sun-young, Go Do-yeon, Kang Ki-doong.

=== Season 9 (2018) ===
No.	Title	Directed by	Written by	Original release date	Ratings
1	"Review Notebook of My Embarrassing Days" (Korean: 나의 흑역사 오답노트)	Hwang Seung-gi	Bae Soo-young	September 14, 2018	2.2%
Cast: Jeon So-min, Park Sung-hoon, Oh Dong-min, Song Ji-in, Seo Sang-won, Park Sun-hee, Min Kyung-ok, Choi Sul, Lee Da-hye, Park Won-seok, Lee Jae-young, Jo Choong-hyun, Kim Sun-geun.
2	"Forgotten Season" (Korean: 잊혀진 계절)	Kim Min-tae	Kim Sung-joon	September 21, 2018	2.7%
Cast: Kim Mu-yeol, Go Bo-gyeol, Jung Joon-won, Go Min-si, Jae Ho, Lee Ji-ha, Lee Dae-yeon, Song Young-jae, Joo In-young, Jang Tae-min, Kim Jong-ho, Won Jong-sun, Oh Il-young, Im Yong-soon, Im Jae-geun, Shin Sun-hee, Yoo Seung-il, Shin Nan-ae, Park Hyun-kyung, Yoo Yeon-mi, Lee Joon-ho, Moon Yong-il, Hwang Myung-hwan, Yoo Kyung-hoon, Im Ji-hyun, Park Joo-won, Jae Ho, Park Hyun-sook (cameo).
3	"The Tuna and the Dolphin" (Korean: 참치와 돌고래)	Song Min-yeop	Lee Jung-eun	September 28, 2018	2.0%
Cast: Park Gyu-young, Yoon Park, Jung Gun-joo, Kim Soo-jin, Lee Seung-hoon, Heo Dong-won, Kim Mi-woo, Seo Yoo-ri, Kang Min-joo, Lee Chae-seo, Park Young-soo, Jang Tae-min, Go Se-hee, Seo In-sung, Joo Ye-rim, Jang Dong-yoon (cameo).
4	"Too Bright for Romance" (Korean: 너무 한낮의 연애)	Yoo Young-eun	Kim Geum-hee	October 5, 2018	1.6%
Cast: Choi Kang-hee, Go Jun, Park Se-wan, Jeon Sung-woo, Kim Joo-hun, Im Sung-mi, Yoon Sung-won, Kim Kyung-il, Jeon Byung-wook, Kim Do-bin, Choi Yoo-jin, Kim You-jung, Kim Dae-hwan, Gil Hae-yeon (cameo), Kim Min-sang (cameo), Woo Mi-hwa (cameo), Lee Yoo-joon (cameo), Jung Young-gi (cameo), Lee Jae-won (cameo), Lee Won-keun (cameo).
5	"Ms. Kim's Mystery" (Korean: 미스김의 미스터리)	Kim Shin-il	Park Sun-hee	October 12, 2018	2.6%
Cast: Kim Da-som, Kwon Hyuk-soo, Lee Gi-joon, Kim Jin-woo, Lee Chae-eun, Park Chul-min, Moon Tae-yoo, Heo Dong-won.
6	"The Long Goodbye" (Korean: 이토록 오랜 이별)	Song Min-yeop	Kim Joo-hee	October 19, 2018	2.7%
Cast: Jang Hee-jin, Lim Ju-hwan, Jung Wook-jin, Jung Jae-sung, Baek Eun-hye, Song Jin-woo, Yoo In-soo, Ha Min, Woo Sung-eun, Jwa Chae-won, Jung Chi-in.
7	"Dreamers" (Korean: 도피자들)	Yoo Young-eun	Bae So-yeon	October 26, 2018	1.1%
Cast: Lee Hak-joo, Kim Sae-byuk, Choi Yu-hwa, Kim Joo-hun, Choi Yoo-song, Lim Sung-jae, Seo Sang-jong, Kim Dae-hwan, Kim Dong-ha, Kim Won-hae (cameo).
8	"My Mom's Third Marriage" (Korean: 엄마의 세 번째 결혼)	Kim Young-jin	Jung Mi-hee	November 2, 2018	3.8%
Cast: Lee Yul-eum, Lee Il-hwa, Kim Young-ok, Han In-soo, Yeon Joon-seok, Park Yoo-hyun, Kim Dong-kyu, Park Hyun-jung, Lee Won-bal, Park Sung-joon, Kim Min, Kim Ha-neul, Lim Ho, Cha Soo-mi, Kim Yoon-seo, Shin Bi, Lee Soo-jin, Hwang Young-eun, Jeon Won-joo (cameo).
9	"The Expiration Date of You and Me" (Korean: 너와 나의 유효기간)	Kim Min-tae	Jung Mi-hee	November 9, 2018	2.1%
Cast: Shin Hyun-soo, Lee Da-in, Min Jin-woong, Lee Ju-eun, Kim Young-dae.
10	"So Close, Yet So Far" (Korean: 닿을 듯 말 듯)	Hwang Seung-gi	Bae Soo-young	November 16, 2018	1.3%
Cast: Park Yoo-na, Kim Min-seok, Park Han-sol, Jung Won-chang, Woo Gi-hoon, Kim Seung-pil, Jung Woo-il, Moon Gi-young, Han Young-kyoon, Oh Seung-hee.

=== Season 10 (2019) ===
No.	Title	Directed by	Written by	Original release date	Ratings
1	"Home Sweet Home" (Korean: 집우집주)	Lee Hyun-seok	Lee Kang	September 27, 2019	1.2%
Cast: Lee Joo-young, Kim Jin-yeop, Han Jae-yi, Yoon Yoo-sun, Seo Hyun-chul, Lee Jung-yul, Kim Nan-hee, Jang Da-kyung, Baek Hyun-joo, Kim Jae-chul, Lee Ta, Park Yoon-shik, Kim Shin-heon, Woo Sung-eun, Lee Hyun-seo, Jung Ho, Jeon Jin-woo, Shin Yong-jin, Lee Han-seo, Kim Ji-ah, Park Ye-chan, Ji Soo-won (cameo), Choi Dae-chul (cameo), Lee Chang-wook (cameo).
2	"Rural Outcasts" (Korean: 웬 아이를 보았네)	Na Soo-jin	Kim Ye-na	October 4, 2019	1.8%
Cast: Kim Soo-in, Tae Hang-ho, Kim Gi-cheon, Im Hyung-joon, Ahn Se-bin, Jin Kyung.
3	"Wreck Car" (Korean: 렉카)	Lee Ho	Yoon Ji-hyung	October 11, 2019	1.0%
Cast: Lee Tae-sun, Kang Ki-doong, Jo Hee-bong, Jang Yul, Yoo Su-bin, Lee Yoon-sun, Moon Jung-gi, Kim Hyun, Kim Do-kyung, Ji Sung-geun, Ahn Hee-joo, Choi Ga-in, Kim Hee-joong, Choi Sung-hee, Yoon Tae-in, Kim Mi-yeon, Seo Yi-soo, Oh Han-gyul, Jeon Bae-soo (cameo), Jung Won-joong (cameo).
4	"Live Like That" (Korean: 그렇게 살다)	Kim Shin-il	Choi Ja-won	October 18, 2019	2.1%
Cast: Jung Dong-hwan, Joo Seok-tae, Lee Kan-hee, Kim Gi-cheon.
5	"Scouting Report" (Korean: 스카우팅 리포트)	Song Min-yeop	Lee Joo-young	October 25, 2019	1.4%
Cast: Choi Won-young, Lee Do-hyun, Yoo Ji-yeon, Kim Ji-hoon, Lee Hyun-kyun, Jeon Gook-hyang, Lee Hwang-hwi.
6	"Goodbye B1" (Korean: 굿바이 비원)	Kim Min-tae	Jo Ah-ra & Kim Min-tae	November 1, 2019	1.0%
Cast: Kim Ga-eun, Jung Joon-won, Jung Yi-seo, Lee Yeon, Lee Ji-ha, Lee Dae-yeon, Cho Ryun.
7	"Socialization: Understanding of Dance" (Korean: 사교-땐스의 이해)	Yoo Young-eun	Lee Kang	November 8, 2019	1.1%
Cast: Shin Do-hyun, Ahn Seung-kyun, Kim Do-wan, Bae Yoon-kyung, Ahn Gil-kang, Baek Ji-won, Min Do-hee, Kim Sun-young, Baek Soo-hee.
8	"Clean and Polish" (Korean: 때빼고 광내고)	Na Soo-jin	Bae Soo-young	November 15, 2019	1.5%
Cast: Park Eun-seok, Na Hye-mi, Kang Ji-hyun, Im Ji-kyu, Byung Hun.
9	"Understanding of Electric Shock" (Korean: 감전의 이해)	Lee Ho	Kim Seung-won	November 22, 2019	1.1%
Cast: Joo Min-kyung, Jang In-sub, Yoon Ji-on, Oh Ryoong, Z.Hera, Do Sang-woo.
10	"Hidden" (Korean: 히든)	Lee Hyun-seok	Yoon Jin-hyung	November 29, 2019	1.2%
Cast: Ryu Hyun-kyung, Seo Dong-hyun, Oh Yeon-ah, Yoo Jae-sang, Yang Dae-hyuk, Choi Dae-hoon.

=== Season 11 (2020) ===
No.	Title	Directed by	Written by	Original release date	Ratings
1	"Modern Girl" (Korean: 모단걸)	Hong Eun-mi	Na Mi-jin	November 7, 2020	3.1%
Cast: Jin Ji-hee, Kim Si-eun, Yoon Ji-on, Oh Seung-hoon, Song Ji-on, Park Ji-won, Gi Eun-soo, Kim Hyun-kyoon, Lee Soo-yong, Lee Kang-min, Oh Joon-min, Ma Hyun-ji, Kim Myung-soo (cameo), Im Won-hee (cameo).
2	"Crevasse" (Korean: 크레바스)	Yoo Kwan-mo	Yeo Myung-jae	November 14, 2020	2.3%
Cast: Yoon Se-ah, Ji Seung-hyun, Kim Hyung-mok, Kim Kyung-min, Yoon Bo-jin, Byun Ho-jin, Kim Soo-kyung, Ahn Young-mi, Lee Ji-yeon, Kim Byung-ki (cameo).
3	"My Teacher" (Korean: 나의 가해자에게)	Na Soo-ji	Kang Han	November 19, 2020	1.5%
Cast: Kim Dae-geon, Moon Yoo-kang, Woo Da-vi, Lee Yeon, Oh Il-young, Park Yoon-young, Han Sang-jin (cameo), Kim Jae-hwa (cameo), Ryu Tae-ho (cameo).
4	"The Pleasures and Sorrows of Work" (Korean: 일의 기쁨과 슬픔)	Choi Sang-yeol	Choi Ja-won	November 21, 2020	1.8%
Cast: Go Won-hee, Kang Mal-geum, Oh Min-suk, Song Jin-woo, Kim Young, Kim Bo-jung, Kim Eun-soo, Cha Dong-ha, Son Jin-ho, Kim Young-joon, Shin Hye-ri, Kim Joo-young, Yoon Sung-won, Jo Sung-jin, Ryu Jin (cameo).
5	"The Reason Why I Can't Tell You" (Korean: 고백하지 않는 이유)	Hong Eun-mi	Yoon Kyung-ah	November 26, 2020	0.8%
Cast: Shin Hyun-soo, Go Min-si, Hwang Hee, Kang Seung-hyun, Kim Yo-han, Yoo Su-bin, Min Joon-hyun, Oh Joon-ho, Gu Yeo-rim, Lee Jae-hee, Shin Kyung-rim, Go In-beom (cameo), Yoon Bok-in (cameo).
6	"My Lilac" (Korean: 그곳에 두고 온 라일락)	Park Gi-hyun	Park Kwang-yeon	November 28, 2020	2.1%
Cast: Lee Han-wi, Jung Yoo-min, Seol Jung-hwan, Kim Kyu-chul, Yoo Min-sang, Ha Jae-sook, Hong Ji-yoon, Kim Duk-hyun, Son Young-son, Shim So-yeon, Kim Jin-seo, Lee Sun-young, Kim Sang-chul, Kim Dong-geon (cameo), Kim Seung-wook (cameo).
7	"A Jaunt" (Korean: 나들이)	Yoo Kwan-mo	Yeon Myung-jae	December 3, 2020	2.2%
Cast: Son Sook, Jung Woong-in, Jung Gi-seop, Kim So-hee, Park Soo-min, Sung No-jin, Kim Young-hee, Lee Chae-kyung, Oh Il-young, Kim Mi-ji, Kim Joo-ah, Lee Young-joo, Jeon Eun-mi, Son Sol.
8	"While You Are Away" (Korean: 도둑잠)	Choi Sang-yeol	Park Kwang-yeon	December 10, 2020	1.8%
Cast: Kim Bo-ra, Dong Ha, Hwang Bo-ra, Kong Yoo-rim, Shin Yoon-jung, Kim Min-sung, Kang Choon-sung, Min Gu-kyung, Park Young-soo, Gu Bon-woong, Lee Young-joon, Jang Young-hyun, Kim Sang-chul, Kang Soo-bin, Lee Eun-kang, Kim Min-jung.
9	"Traces of Love" (Korean: 연애의 흔적)	Yoo Young-eun	Jung Hyun	December 17, 2020	1.4%
Cast: Lee Yoo-young, Lee Sang-yeob, Hong In, Park Mi-hyun, Lee Seo-hwan, Jung Chae-yi, Won Choon-kyu, Lee Jung-hyung, Shim Seung-ah, Kim Joo-hun (cameo).
10	"One Night" (Korean: 원 나잇)	Lee Ho	Lim Ji-eun	December 24, 2020	1.7%
Cast: Kim Sung-cheol, Kim Mi-soo, Jang Sung-beom, Jo Hee-bong, Kang Hyung-seok, Park Kang-seop, Shim Jae-hyun, Yang Taek-ho, Kim Se-joon, Kim Hyung-myung, Kim Min-hee, Na Seo-kyung, Gu Bon-jin, Lee Sun-young, Baek Hyun-joo(cameo).

=== Season 12 (2021) ===
No.	Title	Directed by	Written by	Original release date	Ratings
1	"My Daughter" (Korean: 희수)	Choi Sang-yeol	Yeom Jae-yi	October 22, 2021	1.2%
Cast: Jeon So-min, Park Sung-hoon, Kim Yun-seul, Kim Kang-hyun and Park Ha-na
2	"F20" (Korean: 에프이공)	Hong Eun-mi	Chae-chae	Unaired	TBA
Cast: Jang Young-nam, Kim Jung-young, Kim Kang-min
3	"Nap on the Desert" (Korean: 통증의 풍경)	Hong Eun-mi	Kwon Hyuk-Jin, Song Seul-Ki	November 5, 2021	1.2%
Cast: Ahn Nae-sang, Gil Hae-yeon, Baek Ji-won, Lee Shin-ki
4	"Siren" (Korean: 사이렌)	An Joon-Yong	Go Woo-Jin	November 12, 2021	1.2%
Cast: Choi Jin-hyuk, Park Seong-yeon, Jo Dal-hwan, and Koo Ja-sung
5	"A Moment of Romance" (Korean: 딱밤 한 대가 이별에 미치는 영향)	Ko Sung-jun	Kim Mi-kyung	November 19, 2021	1.3%
Cast: Kang Tae-oh, Shin Ye-eun, Hong Kyung, Ha Yoon-kyung
6	"Be;twin" (Korean: 비트윈)	Choi Yeon-soo	Yeom Jay	November 26, 2021	0.7%
Cast: Sung Yoo-bin and Hong Su-zu
7	"The Palace" (Korean: 그녀들)	Lee Woong-hee	Kang Han	December 3, 2021	1.6%
Cast: Kim Sae-ron, Jung Da-eun, Lee Chae-kyung and Seo Eun-young
8	"Atonement" (Korean: 셋)	Koo Sung-joon	Lee Nam-hee	December 10, 2021	1.0%
Cast: So Joo-yeon, Jeong Yi-seo, and Jo In
9	"Oddinary" (Korean: 보통의 재화)	Choi Yeon-soo	Kim Sung-joon	December 17, 2021	0.7%
Cast: Kwak Sun-young, Choi Dae-hoon, and Kim Na-yeon
10	"Abyss" (Korean: 기억의 해각)	Lee Woong-hee	Park Jae-yoon	December 24, 2021	1.3%
Cast: Moon Geun-young, Jo Han-sun, and Kang Sang-joon

=== Season 13 (2022) ===
No.	Title	Directed by	Written by	Original release date	Ratings (Note: AGB Nielsen ratings 2022)
1	"The Stain" (Korean: 얼룩)	Lee Min-soo	Yeo Yeo-jae	November 16, 2022	2.6%
Cast: Cha Hak-yeon, Byun Seo-yoon, and Lee Si-woo
2	"Currently Offline" (Korean: 방종)	Choi Jeong-eun	Wi Jae-hwa	November 17, 2022	1.1%
Cast: Kim Ki-hae, Son Sang-kyung, Park Jung-pyo and Kim Sang-woo
3	"Prism" (Korean: 프리즘)	Lee Dae-kyung	Wi Jae-hwa	December 1, 2022 (Note: Due to FIFA World Cup, episodes were not aired on 23rd, 24th and 30 November.)	0.8%
Cast: Hong Seo-hee, Kim Min-chul, Kim Sun-bin, Pyo Yeong-seo
4	"Like Otters" (Korean: 열아홉 해달들)	Kim Su-jin	Ko Woo-jin	December 7, 2022	1.3%
Cast: Shin Eun-soo, Kim Jae-won, Lee Chan-hyung
5	"The Stranger" (Korean: 낯선 계절에 만나)	Lee Min-soo	Yeo Yeo-jae	December 8, 2022	1.4%
Cast: Han Ji-eun, Kim Gun-woo
6	"The Season of Undies" (Korean: 팬티의 계절)	Choi Jeong-eun	Lee Ji-woo	December 14, 2022	1.2%
Cast: Kang Seung-yoon, Choi Jae-seop, Kang Seong-hoon, and Woo Min-gyu
7	"In My Ashtanga Class" (Korean: 아쉬탕가를 아시나요)	Lee Dae-kyung	Jay Yeom	December 15, 2022	1.7%
Cast: Bae Yoon-kyung, Joo Jong-hyuk
8	"Silence of the Lambs" (Korean: 양들의 침묵)	Kim Su-jin	Kang Kang	December 21, 2022	1.5%
Cast: Kim Sae-byuk, Jeon Hye-won
9	"Devil in the Lake" (Korean: 귀못)	Tak Se-woong	Tak Se-woong	December 22, 2022	1.3%
Cast: Park Ha-na, Heo Jin, Jung Young-joo
10	"The Distributors" (Korean: 유포자들)	Hong Seok-gu	Jung Woo-cheol	December 28, 2022	1.5%
Cast: Park Sung-hoon, Kim So-eun

=== Season 14 (2023) ===
No.	Title	Directed by	Written by	Original release date	Ratings (Note: AGB Nielsen ratings 2023)
1	"No Path Back" (Korean: 극야)	Min-seok Jang	Choi Ja-won	October 14, 2023	0.6%
Cast: Lee Jae-won, Choi Seong-won, and Kim Kang-hyeon
2	"Half Lies" (Korean: 반쪽짜리 거짓말)	Hyun-kyung	Yun Tae-woo	October 21, 2023	1.1%
Cast: Kim Won-hae, Min Ji-ah, Ahn Se-bin and Park Ji-ah
3	"Shoot For Love" (Korean: 도현의 고백)	Seo Yong-soo	Cho Il-yeon	October 28, 2023	1.3%
Cast: Shin So-yul, Lee Yeon, and Cha Sun-woo
4	"Anyone Anywhere" (Korean: 우리들이 있었다)	Ham Yeong-geol	Yoon Tae-woo	November 4, 2023	0.9%
Cast: Lee Min-jae, Kim Hyun-soo, and Kang Na-eon
5	"Dog Days of Summer" (Korean: 폭염주의보)	Jang Min-seok	Choi Yi-kyung	November 11, 2023	0.7%
Cast: Moon Woo-jin, Park Seo-kyung
6	"The True Love of Madam" (Korean: 마님은 왜 마당쇠에게 고기를 주었나)	Ham Young-geol	Wi Jae-hwa	November 18, 2023	1.6%
Cast: Park Ha-sun, Kim Joo-hun
7	"Love Attack" (Korean: 고백공격)	Lee Hyun-kyung	Choi Yi-kyung	November 25, 2023	0.7%
Cast: Kim Do-hoon, Chae Won-bin
8	"Overlap Knife, Knife" (Korean: 오버랩 나이프, 나이프)	Seo Yong-su	Kwon Oh-joo	December 2, 2023	0.6%
Cast: Kim Dong-hwi, Jo Aram, Shim Yi-young, Joo Seok-tae
9	"Behind the Shadows" (Korean: 그림자 고백)	Lee Dae-kyung	Park Eun-seo	December 9, 2023	1.2%
Cast: Ren, Park Sang-nam, Hong Seung-hee, Hahm Eun-jung
10	"Joseon Chefs" (Korean: 수운잡방)	Choi Yeon-soo	Jo Soo-yeong, Kim Ik-hyun	December 16, 2023	1%
Cast: Kim Kang-min, Yoon San-ha, Baek Sung-hyun

=== 2024 ===
Ep.	Title	Original release date (2024)
1	The History of Us	November 5
2	Finding Handsome	November 12
3	The Two Women	November 26
4	The Road in Between	December 3
5	To My Lonely Sister	December 10

=== 2025 (Love : Track) ===
Ep.	Title	Original release date (2025)
1	Onion Soup After Hours	December 14
2	When We Were Wired	December 14
3	Love Hotel	December 17
4	Finding Us	December 17
5	My Father's Funeral	December 21
6	Kimchi	December 21
7	More Than Stars	December 24
8	Minji Minji Minji	December 24
9	Love's Grace Period	December 28
10	A Soundtrack Like No Other	December 28

== Awards and nominations ==
=== KBS Drama Awards ===
Year presented, category, nominated work, recipient, and the result of the nomination
Year	Category	Nominated work	Recipient	Result
2010	Best Actor in a One-Act/Special/Short Drama	"Red Candy"	Lee Jae-ryong	Nominated
2010	Best Actor in a One-Act/Special/Short Drama	"Our Slightly Risque Relationship"	Lee Sun-kyun	Won
2010	Best Actor in a One-Act/Special/Short Drama	"Rock, Rock, Rock"	No Min-woo	Nominated
2010	Best Actor in a One-Act/Special/Short Drama	"Spy Trader Kim Chul-soo's Recent Condition"	Oh Man-seok	Nominated
2010	Best Actor in a One-Act/Special/Short Drama	"Texas Hit"	Son Hyun-joo	Won
2010	Best Actress in a One-Act/Special/Short Drama	"Pianist"	Han Ji-hye	Nominated
2010	Best Actress in a One-Act/Special/Short Drama	"Our Slightly Risque Relationship"	Hwang Woo-seul-hye	Nominated
2010	Best Actress in a One-Act/Special/Short Drama	"The Great Gye Choon-bin"	Jung Yu-mi	Won
2010	Best Actress in a One-Act/Special/Short Drama	"Red Candy"	Park Si-yeon	Nominated
2010	Best Young Actress	"Last Flashman"	Park Yoo-sun	Nominated
2011	Best Actor in a One-Act/Special/Short Drama	"For My Son"	Choi Soo-jong	Won
2011	Best Actor in a One-Act/Special/Short Drama	"Crossing the Yeongdo Bridge"	Jung Jin-young	Nominated
2011	Best Actor in a One-Act/Special/Short Drama	"Perfect Spy"	Lee Hee-joon	Won
2011	Best Actor in a One-Act/Special/Short Drama	"Yeongdeok Women's Wrestling Team"	Lee Jong-hyuk	Nominated
2011	Best Actor in a One-Act/Special/Short Drama	"Perfect Spy"	Son Hyun-joo	Nominated
2011	Best Actress in a One-Act/Special/Short Drama	"Hair Show"	Baek Jin-hee	Nominated
2011	Best Actress in a One-Act/Special/Short Drama	"Princess Hwapyung's Weight Loss"	Eugene	Won
2011	Best Actress in a One-Act/Special/Short Drama	"400-year-old Dream"	Han Eun-jung	Won
2011	Best Actress in a One-Act/Special/Short Drama	"For My Son"	Hwang Soo-jung	Nominated
2011	Best Actress in a One-Act/Special/Short Drama	"Perfect Spy"	Yoo In-young	Nominated
2012	Best Actor in a One-Act/Special/Short Drama	"Don't Worry, I'm a Ghost"	Bong Tae-gyu	Nominated
2012	Best Actor in a One-Act/Special/Short Drama	"Do You Know Taekwondo?"	Im Ji-kyu	Nominated
2012	Best Actor in a One-Act/Special/Short Drama	"Still Picture"	Namkoong Min	Nominated
2012	Best Actor in a One-Act/Special/Short Drama	"Wetlands Ecology Report"	Sung Joon	Won
2012	Best Actor in a One-Act/Special/Short Drama	"Just an Ordinary Love Story"	Yeon Woo-jin	Won
2012	Best Actor in a One-Act/Special/Short Drama	"Missing Case of National Assembly Member Jung Chi-sung"	Yu Oh-seong	Nominated
2012	Best Actress in a One-Act/Special/Short Drama	"My Prettiest Moments" and "Gate of Non-Duality"	Jeon Ye-seo	Nominated
2012	Best Actress in a One-Act/Special/Short Drama	"A Corner"	Kim Yong-rim	Nominated
2012	Best Actress in a One-Act/Special/Short Drama	"Still Picture"	Moon Jeong-hee	Nominated
2012	Best Actress in a One-Act/Special/Short Drama	"Don't Worry, I'm a Ghost"	Park Shin-hye	Won
2012	Best Actress in a One-Act/Special/Short Drama	"Culprit Among Friends"	Shim Yi-young	Nominated
2012	Best Actress in a One-Act/Special/Short Drama	"Just an Ordinary Love Story"	Yoo Da-in	Won
2012	Best Young Actor	"Gate of Non-Duality"	Kim Woo-seok	Nominated
2012	Best Young Actor	"A Corner"	Yeon Joon-seok	Nominated
2012	Best Young Actress	"Girl Detective Park Hae-sol"	Nam Ji-hyun	Won
2012	Best Young Actress	"SOS: Save Our School"	Seo Shin-ae	Nominated
2013	Best Actor in a One-Act/Special/Short Drama	"Yeon-woo's Summer"	Han Joo-wan	Nominated
2013	Best Actor in a One-Act/Special/Short Drama	"Happy! Rose Day"	Jung Woong-in	Nominated
2013	Best Actor in a One-Act/Special/Short Drama	"The Memory in My Old Wallet"	Ryu Soo-young	Nominated
2013	Best Actor in a One-Act/Special/Short Drama	"Sirius"	Seo Jun-young	Nominated
2013	Best Actor in a One-Act/Special/Short Drama	"The Devil Rider" and "Mother's Island"	Yu Oh-seong	Won
2013	Best Actress in a One-Act/Special/Short Drama	"Yeon-woo's Summer"	Han Ye-ri	Won
2013	Best Actress in a One-Act/Special/Short Drama	"The Devil Rider"	Lee Chae-young	Nominated
2013	Best Actress in a One-Act/Special/Short Drama	"Outlasting Happiness"	Ryu Hyun-kyung	Nominated
2013	Best Actress in a One-Act/Special/Short Drama	"Their Perfect Day"	Song Seon-mi	Nominated
2013	Best Actress in a One-Act/Special/Short Drama	"Chagall's Birthday"	Ye Ji-won	Nominated
2013	Best New Actor	"Yeon-woo's Summer"	Han Joo-wan	Won
2013	Best New Actress	"The Memory in My Old Wallet"	Nam Bo-ra	Nominated
2014	Best Actor in a One-Act/Special/Short Drama	"Vengeful Spirit"	Ahn Jae-mo	Nominated
2014	Best Actor in a One-Act/Special/Short Drama	"The Tale of the Bookworm"	Han Joo-wan	Nominated
2014	Best Actor in a One-Act/Special/Short Drama	"Repulsive Love"	Jo Dal-hwan	Won
2014	Best Actor in a One-Act/Special/Short Drama	"I'm Dying Soon"	Oh Jung-se	Nominated
2014	Best Actor in a One-Act/Special/Short Drama	"The Dirge Singer"	Seo Jun-young	Nominated
2014	Best Actor in a One-Act/Special/Short Drama	"Monster"	Yeon Joon-seok	Nominated
2014	Best Actress in a One-Act/Special/Short Drama	"We All Cry Differently"	Kim So-hyun	Won
2014	Best Actress in a One-Act/Special/Short Drama	"The Dirge Singer"	Kim You-jung	Nominated
2014	Best Actress in a One-Act/Special/Short Drama	"Middle School Student A"	Lee Yeol-eum	Nominated
2014	Best Actress in a One-Act/Special/Short Drama	"Vengeful Spirit"	Park Eun-hye	Nominated
2014	Best Actress in a One-Act/Special/Short Drama	"Playing Games"	Woo Hee-jin	Nominated
2014	Best Supporting Actress	"The Girl Who Became a Photo"	Jin Kyung	Nominated
2014	Best New Actress	"I'm Dying Soon"	Kim Seul-gi	Won
2014	Best New Actress	"Playing Games"	Shin So-yul	Nominated
2014	Best Young Actor	"Middle School Student A"	Kwak Dong-yeon	Won
2014	Best Young Actress	"Bomi's Room"	Ahn Seo-hyun	Won
2015	Best Actor in a One-Act/Special/Short Drama	"Trains Don't Stop at Noryangjin Station"	Bong Tae-gyu	Won
2015	Best Actor in a One-Act/Special/Short Drama	"Crimson Moon"	Kim Dae-myung	Nominated
2015	Best Actor in a One-Act/Special/Short Drama	"The Wind Blows to the Hope"	Kim Yeong-cheol	Nominated
2015	Best Actor in a One-Act/Special/Short Drama	"What Is the Ghost Up To?"	Lee Joon	Nominated
2015	Best Actor in a One-Act/Special/Short Drama	"The Brothers' Summer"	Yu Oh-seong	Nominated
2015	Best Actress in a One-Act/Special/Short Drama	"What Is the Ghost Up To?"	Cho Soo-hyang	Nominated
2015	Best Actress in a One-Act/Special/Short Drama	"Contract Man"	Choi Myung-gil	Nominated
2015	Best Actress in a One-Act/Special/Short Drama	"Fake Family"	Lee Ha-na	Won
2015	Best Actress in a One-Act/Special/Short Drama	"Funny Woman"	Moon Ji-in	Nominated
2016	Best Actor in a One-Act/Special/Short Drama	"Twenty Dollars to Pyeongyang"	Han Joo-wan	Nominated
2016	Best Actor in a One-Act/Special/Short Drama	"The Red Teacher"	Lee Dong-hwi	Won
2016	Best Actor in a One-Act/Special/Short Drama	"The Legendary Lackey"	Lee Ji-hoon	Nominated
2016	Best Actor in a One-Act/Special/Short Drama	"My Happy Home"	Lee Sang-yeob	Nominated
2016	Best Actor in a One-Act/Special/Short Drama	"The Legendary Lackey"	Seo Ji-hoon	Nominated
2016	Best Actress in a One-Act/Special/Short Drama	"Noodle House Girl"	Jeon Hye-bin	Nominated
2016	Best Actress in a One-Act/Special/Short Drama	"The Red Teacher"	Jung So-min	Nominated
2016	Best Actress in a One-Act/Special/Short Drama	"My Happy Home"	Son Yeo-eun	Nominated
2016	Best Young Actress	"Summer Dream"	Kim Bo-min	Nominated
2017	Best Actor in a One-Act/Special/Short Drama	"The Reason We Can't Sleep"	Im Ji-kyu	Nominated
2017	Best Actor in a One-Act/Special/Short Drama	"If We Were a Season"	Jang Dong-yoon	Nominated
2017	Best Actor in a One-Act/Special/Short Drama	"Slow"	Kwak Dong-yeon	Nominated
2017	Best Actor in a One-Act/Special/Short Drama	"Let Us Meet"	Son Ho-jun	Nominated
2017	Best Actor in a One-Act/Special/Short Drama	"Dancing the Waltz Alone"	Yeo Hoe-hyun	Won
2017	Best Actress in a One-Act/Special/Short Drama	"If We Were a Season"	Chae Soo-bin	Nominated
2017	Best Actress in a One-Act/Special/Short Drama	"Let Us Meet"	Jo Bo-ah	Nominated
2017	Best Actress in a One-Act/Special/Short Drama	"Kang Duk-soon's Love History"	Kim So-hye	Nominated
2017	Best Actress in a One-Act/Special/Short Drama	"Dancing the Waltz Alone"	Moon Ga-young	Nominated
2017	Best Actress in a One-Act/Special/Short Drama	"Madame Jung's One Last Week"	Ra Mi-ran	Won
2017	Best New Actor	"The Love of a Buzz Cut"	Kim Jung-hyun	Nominated
2017	Best Supporting Actor	"You Are Closer Than I Think"	Dong Ha	Nominated
2017	Best Young Actress	"Madame Jung's One Last Week"	Shin Rin-ah	Nominated
2018	Best Actor in a One-Act/Special/Short Drama	"Forgotten Season"	Kim Mu-yeol	Nominated
2018	Best Actor in a One-Act/Special/Short Drama	"Review Notebook of My Embarrassing Days"	Park Sung-hoon	Nominated
2018	Best Actor in a One-Act/Special/Short Drama	"The Tuna and the Dolphin"	Yoon Park	Won
2018	Best Actress in a One-Act/Special/Short Drama	"Too Bright for Romance"	Choi Kang Hee	Nominated
2018	Best Actress in a One-Act/Special/Short Drama	"Review Notebook of My Embarrassing Days"	Jeon So-min	Nominated
2018	Best Actress in a One-Act/Special/Short Drama	"Forgotten Season"	Ko Bo-gyeol	Nominated
2018	Best Actress in a One-Act/Special/Short Drama	"My Mom's Third Marriage"	Lee Il-hwa	Won
2018	Best Actress in a One-Act/Special/Short Drama	"Too Bright for Romance"	Park Se-wan	Nominated
2019	Best Actor in a One-Act/Special/Short Drama	"Scouting Report"	Choi Won-young	Nominated
2019	Best Actor in a One-Act/Special/Short Drama	"Live Like That"	Jung Dong-hwan	Won
2019	Best Actor in a One-Act/Special/Short Drama	"Scouting Report"	Lee Do-hyun	Won
2019	Best Actor in a One-Act/Special/Short Drama	"Wreck Car"	Lee Tae-sun	Nominated
2019	Best Actor in a One-Act/Special/Short Drama	"Clean and Polish"	Park Eun-seok	Nominated
2019	Best Actor in a One-Act/Special/Short Drama	"Rural Outcasts"	Tae Hang-ho	Nominated
2019	Best Actress in a One-Act/Special/Short Drama	"Goodbye B1"	Kim Ga-eun	Nominated
2019	Best Actress in a One-Act/Special/Short Drama	"Home Sweet Home"	Lee Joo-young	Won
2019	Best Actress in a One-Act/Special/Short Drama	"Clean and Polish"	Na Hye-mi	Nominated
2019	Best Actress in a One-Act/Special/Short Drama	"Hidden"	Ryu Hyun-kyung	Nominated
2019	Best Actress in a One-Act/Special/Short Drama	"Socialization: Understanding of Dance"	Shin Do-hyun	Nominated
2019	Best New Actor	"Goodbye B1"	Jung Joon-won	Nominated
2019	Best New Actor	"Clean and Polish"	Park Eun-seok	Nominated
2019	Best Supporting Actor	"Wreck Car"	Jeon Bae-soo	Nominated
2019	Best Supporting Actress	"Socialization: Understanding of Dance"	Kim Sun-young	Nominated
2019	Best Supporting Actress	"Clean and Polish"	Na Hye-mi	Nominated
2019	Best Young Actress	"Rural Outcasts"	Kim Soo-in	Nominated
2020	Best Actor in a One-Act/Special/Short Drama	"My Lilac"	Lee Han-wi	Won
2020	Best Actor in a One-Act/Special/Short Drama	"My Teacher"	Kim Dae-geon	Nominated
2020	Best Actor in a One-Act/Special/Short Drama	"One Night"	Kim Sung-cheol	Nominated
2020	Best Actor in a One-Act/Special/Short Drama	"The Pleasures and Sorrows of Work"	Oh Min-suk	Nominated
2020	Best Actor in a One-Act/Special/Short Drama	"Traces of Love"	Lee Sang-yeob	Nominated
2020	Best Actress in a One-Act/Special/Short Drama	"Traces of Love"	Lee Yoo-young	Won
2020	Best Actress in a One-Act/Special/Short Drama	"A Jaunt"	Son Sook	Won
2020	Best Actress in a One-Act/Special/Short Drama	"The Reason Why I Can't Tell You"	Go Min-si	Nominated
2020	Best Actress in a One-Act/Special/Short Drama	"Modern Girl"	Jin Ji-hee	Nominated
2020	Best Actress in a One-Act/Special/Short Drama	"The Pleasures and Sorrows of Work"	Go Won-hee	Nominated
2020	Best Actress in a One-Act/Special/Short Drama	"Crevasse"	Yoon Se-ah	Nominated
2020	Best Supporting Actor	"Traces of Love"	Kim Joo-hun	Nominated
2020	Best New Actress	"The Pleasures and Sorrows of Work"	Kang Mal-geum	Nominated
2021	Best Actor in Drama Special/TV Cinema	"My Daughter"	Park Sung-hoon	Won
2021	Best Actress in Drama Special/TV Cinema	"My Daughter"	Jeon So-min	Won
2021	Best Actress in Drama Special/TV Cinema	"The Palace"	Kim Sae-ron	Won
2022	Best Actor in Drama Special/TV Cinema	"The Stain"	Cha Hak-yeon	Won
2022	Best Actress in Drama Special/TV Cinema	"Like Otters"	Shin Eun-soo	Won
2023	Best Actor in Drama Special/TV Cinema	"No Path BacK"	Lee Jae-won	Won
2023	Best Actress in Drama Special/TV Cinema	"Love Attack"	Chae Won-bin	Won
2023	Best Actress in Drama Special/TV Cinema	"Behind the Shadows"	Hong Seung-hee	Won
2023	Best Young Actor	"Dog Days of Summer"	Moon Woo-jin	Won

=== Other awards ===
Year	Award	Category	Nominated work	Result	Ref.
2021	Grimae Awards	Best New Actor	Lee Shin-ki in "Nap on the Desert"	Won	
2022	Stockholm Film & Television Festival	Best Feature Film	"Siren"	Won	
2022	APAN Star Awards	Best Short Drama	"My Daughter"	Nominated	

== See also ==
- Drama City
- Drama Special Series
- Drama Stage
