= Jeon So-min =

South Korean actress (born 1986)

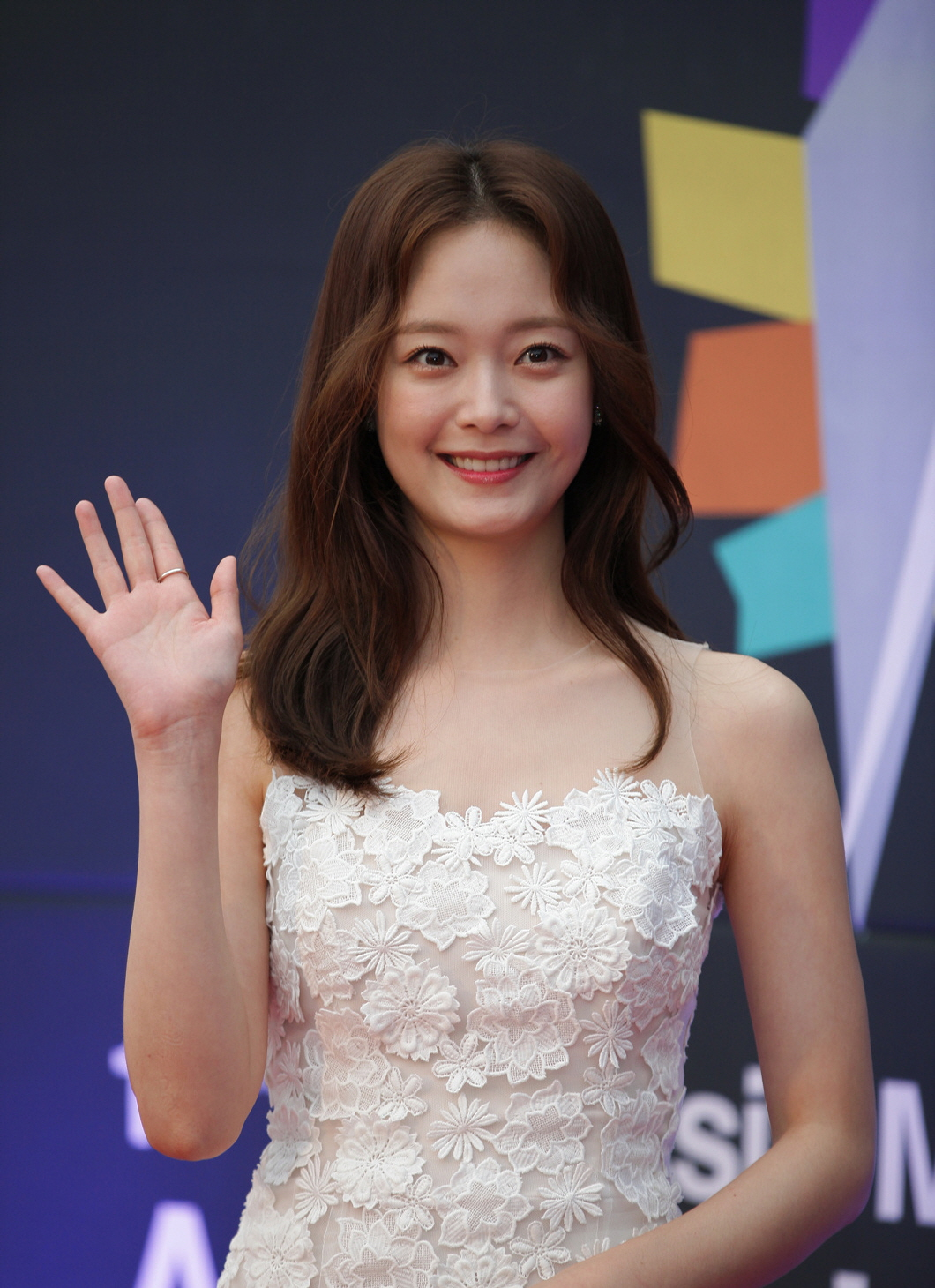
- Jeon in 2017
- Born: April 7, 1986 (age 40); Goyang, Gyeonggi Province, South Korea
- Education: Dongduk Women's University (Broadcasting and Entertainment)
- Occupation: Actress
- Years active: 2004–present
- Agent: Makit Studio

Korean name
- Hangul: 전소민
- RR: Jeon Somin
- MR: Chŏn Somin

Signature
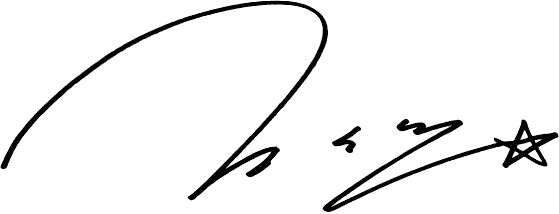

Jeon So-min (Korean: 전소민; born April 7, 1986) is a South Korean actress. Jeon made her debut in 2004 with the sitcom Miracle. In 2006, she made her big-screen debut through the film, Cinderella. Jeon played her first leading role in the television series Princess Aurora, for which she won the Best New Actress Award at the 2013 MBC Drama Awards.

Her other notable performances include the daily drama Tomorrow Victory (2015); romantic comedy drama Something About 1% (2016); medical thriller Cross (2018); and romantic comedy dramas Top Star U-back (2018), Review: Notebook of my Embarrassing Days (2018), Birthday Letter (2019), and Big Data Romance (2019).

Jeon was a regular cast member of variety show Running Man from April 2017 to October 2023, where she achieved international recognition. She also appeared in the first two seasons of variety show Sixth Sense.

== Early life ==
Jeon So-min was born on April 7, 1986. Her hometown is at Goyang, Gyeonggi Province. Jeon has a younger brother, Wook-min. Before Jeon's official debut in the acting industry, she had been working as a fashion magazine model on her second year of high school. She graduated from Dongduk Women's University, majoring in Broadcasting and Entertainment.

== Career ==
In April 2017, Jeon joined Running Man as a regular cast member.

In January 2020, Jeon published her first book titled You Can Call Me After a Drink.

In April 2020, it was announced that Jeon has signed with King Kong by Starship.

In October 2020, Jeon starred in The Name.

In May 2022, Jeon renewed her contract with King Kong by Starship.

On October 23, 2023, King Kong by Starship announced that Jeon would be stepping down from Running Man to recharge and focus on her acting. Her last recording took place on October 30, 2023.

On May 8, 2024, King Kong by Starship announced that Jeon's exclusive contract wouldn't be renewed, ending her 4-year collaboration with the agency. In July, she signed with new agency Studio Santa Claus Entertainment. Jeon later joined the management agency Makit Studio.

== Other ventures ==
=== Ambassadorship ===
Year	Title	Ref.
2010	Recycling Your Bicycle Promotional Ambassador	
2011	41st Earth Day Public Relations Ambassador	
2013	5th Ambassador for Climate Change Week	
2014	6th Ambassador to the Climate Change Week	
2014	Boryeong Mud Festival Public Relations Ambassador	
2015	Suncheon Bay Animal Film Festival Ambassador	
2016	Public Relations Ambassador of the "Four Great Social Policies: Sexual Violence, School Violence, Domestic Violence and Bad Food Distribution"	
2019	Personal information protection campaign promotional ambassadors with mobile carriers	

== Filmography ==
=== Film ===
Year	Title	Role	Notes	Ref.
2006	Cinderella	Hye-won		
2011	Help Me		Short film	
2012	Love Call	Soo-ah		
2013	Sun Cream		Short film	
2019	Shall We Do It Again		Cameo	
2020	THE NAME	Seo Ri-ae		
2022	2037	Jang Mi		
2024	Idiot Girls and School Ghost: School Anniversary	Homeroom Teacher	Cameo	
2025	Only God Knows Everything	Baek Soo-yeon		
2026	Eighteen Youth	Hee-joo		

=== Television series ===
Year	Title	Role	Notes	Ref.
2004	Miracle			
2004	Drama City: "Father of the Ocean"		One-act drama	
2007	The Great Catsby	Choi Soo-yeon		
2008	One Mom and Three Dads	Nam Jong-hee		
2008	East of Eden	Lee Ki-soon		
2010	Joseon X-Files	Choi Eui-sin	Cameo (Episode 6)	
2010	Jungle Fish 2	Ahn Ba-woo's dating partner	Cameo (Episode 3)	
2010–2011	Finding Mr. and Ms. Right	Young-hwa		
2011	Baby Faced Beauty	Lee Jin-hee	Cameo (Episode 7 and 9)	
2011	Drama Special: "Yeongdeok Women's Wrestling Team"	Cha Yeon-hee	One-act drama	
2011	KBS HDTV Literature Hall: "Gwangyeom Sonata"	Nam Jeong-yeon		
2011–2012	Insu, the Queen Mother	Jang Nok-soo	Cameo (Episode 56–58 and 60)	
2013	Princess Aurora	Oh Ro-ra		
2014	Endless Love	Kim Se-gyung		
2014	Mother's Garden	Baek Song-i	Cameo (Episode 16)	
2014	More Than a Maid	Dan-ji		
2015	Late Night Restaurant	Hye-jin	Cameo (Episode 13)	
2015–2016	Tomorrow Victory	Han Seung-ri		
2016	Drinking Solo	Kim Won-hae's sister-in-law Jin Jung-suk's blind date partner	Cameo (Episode 10)	
2016	Something About 1%	Kim Da-hyun		
2017	My Secret Romance	Girl in the Club	Cameo (Episode 1)	
2017	Idol Drama Operation Team	Herself	Cameo (Episode 1 and 8)	
2017	The Bride of Habaek	Patient	Cameo (Episode 4)	
2017	Single Wife	TV Host	Cameo (Episode 1)	
2018	Cross	Go Ji-in		
2018	Drama Special: "Review Notebook of My Embarrassing Days"	Do Do-hye	One-act drama	
2018	Top Star U-back	Oh Kang-soon		
2019	Drama Special: "Birthday Letter"	Kim Jae-yeon		
2019	Drama Stage: "Big Data Dating"	Ahn Bit-na	One-act drama	
2021	Drama Special: "Hee-soo"	Hwang Joo-eun	Four-act drama	
2021–2022	Show Window: The Queen's House	Yoon Mi-ra		
2022	Cleaning Up	Ahn In-kyung		
2023	Delivery Man	Ghost	Cameo (Episode 4)	
2024–2025	Sorry Not Sorry	Ji Song-yi		

=== Web series ===
Year	Title	Role	Notes	Ref.
2021	So I Married the Anti-fan	Kim Da-hyun	Cameo (Episode 11)	

=== Television shows ===
Year	Title	Role	Notes	Ref.
2017	Living Together in Empty Room	Cast member	With Brave Brothers and Yang Se-chan (Episode 1–7)	
2017–2023	Running Man	Cast member		
2020–2021	Sixth Sense	Cast member	Season 1–2	
2022–2023	The Skip Dating	Host		

=== Hosting ===
Year	Title	Notes	Ref.
2019	25th Dream Concert	With Leeteuk and Gongchan	
2021	2020 APAN Music Awards	With Kim Jong-kook	
2022	2022 K-Global Heart Dream Awards	With Lee Yong-jin	

=== Music video appearances ===
Year	Song title	Artist	Ref.
2004	"How Much"	Turtles	
2011	"Just Looking at You Is Nice"	No Reply	
2011	"Sun & Star"	Joosuc	
2013	"Atlantis Princess"	Lena Park	
2021	"Be With Me"	Soran	

== Discography ==
=== Singles ===
Title	Year	Album	Ref.
"He_Starlight" (Kim Dong-wan feat. Jeon So-min)	2014	Non-album single	
"Confession, Come Out Now" (with Soran and Yoo Jae-suk as JeonSoran and Yoo Jae-suk)	2019	Running Man Fan-meeting: Project Running 9	
"I Like It" (with Running Man members)	2019	Running Man Fan-meeting: Project Running 9	

=== Narrations ===
Title	Year	Album	Ref.
"Blue & Blue" (Choi Botton Narr. Jeon So-min)	2021	Normal Blue	
"I Love You" (Choi Botton Narr. Jeon So-min)	2021	Normal Red	
"Why Not Cut Long Hair" (Choi Botton Narr. Jeon So-min)	2021	Normal Black	

=== Composition credits ===
Title	Year	Artist	Album	Notes	Ref.
"Blue & Blue"	2021	Choi Botton	Normal Blue	As lyricist	
"I Love You"	2021	Choi Botton	Normal Red	As lyricist	
"Romantic"	2021	Choi Botton	Normal Red	As lyricist	
"Why Not Cut Long Hair"	2021	Choi Botton	Normal Black	As lyricist	
"Let's Be Forever"	2021	Choi Botton	Normal White	As lyricist	
"One Room"	2021	Lee Ki-chan	Non-album single	As lyricist	
"Witness"	2024	Choi Jung-in	Non-album single	As lyricist	

== Awards and nominations ==
Name of the award ceremony, year presented, category, nominee of the award, and the result of the nomination
Award ceremony	Year	Category	Nominee(s) / Work(s)	Result	Ref.
Asia Artist Awards	2020	Popularity Award (Actress)	Jeon So-min	Nominated	
Asia Model Awards	2014	Drama Star Award	Princess Aurora	Won	
Asia Model Awards	2017	Popular Star Award	Jeon So-min	Won	
Brand Customer Loyalty Awards	2019	Actress Brand Loyalty Leader	Jeon So-min	Won	
KBS Drama Awards	2018	Best Actress in a One-Act/Special/Short Drama	Review Notebook of My Embarrassing Days	Nominated	
KBS Drama Awards	2021	Best Actress in Drama Special/TV Cinema	Hee-soo	Won	
Korea Drama Awards	2014	Excellence Award, actress	Princess Aurora	Nominated	
Korea Drama Awards	2022	Excellence Award, actress	Show Window: The Queen's House	Won	
Korea First Brand Awards	2018	Female Commercial Model Award	Jeon So-min	Won	
Korea First Brand Awards	2020	Best Multi-Entertainer	Running Man and The Sixth Sense	Won	
Korea First Brand Awards	2021	Best Multi-Entertainer (Female)	Jeon So-min	Won	
MBC Drama Awards	2013	Best New Actress	Princess Aurora	Won	
MBC Drama Awards	2016	Excellence Award, Actress in a Serial Drama	Tomorrow Victory	Nominated	
SBS Entertainment Awards	2017	Rookie Award, Variety	Running Man	Won	
SBS Entertainment Awards	2017	Best Couple Award	Jeon So-min (with Lee Kwang-soo); Running Man	Won	
SBS Entertainment Awards	2018	Top Excellence Award in Variety Category	Running Man	Won	
SBS Entertainment Awards	2018	Excellence Award in Variety Category	Running Man	Nominated	
SBS Entertainment Awards	2018	Best Couple Award	Jeon So-min (with Lee Kwang-soo); Running Man	Nominated	
SBS Entertainment Awards	2020	Golden Content Award	With Running Man members	Won	
Seoul International Drama Awards	2022	Best Actress	Hee-soo	Nominated	
