= Review Notebook of My Embarrassing Days =

- KBS Drama Special episode
- Episode no.: Season 9 Episode 1
- Directed by: Hwang Seung-gi
- Written by: Bae Soo-young
- Original air date: September 14, 2018
- Running time: 69 minutes

Episode chronology
← Previous "The Love of a Buzz Cut"	Next → "Forgotten Season"

"Review Notebook of My Embarrassing Days" (Korean: 나의 흑역사 오답노트) is the ninth season premiere episode of the anthology television series KBS Drama Special. It stars Jeon So-min and Park Sung-hoon, and aired on KBS2 on September 14, 2018.

== Synopsis ==
A group of math teachers is chosen to review an exam. Do Do-hye and her ex-husband are among the group of teachers.Na Pil-seung, a security officer, is tasked with ensuring that the teachers do not leak exam material. Do-hye and Pil-seung shared some embarrassing moments during their college days. Do-hye tries her best to avoid these embarrassing memories.

The review process is crucial, as the exam results will have significant consequences for the students.

== Cast ==
- Jeon So-min as Do Do-hye
- Park Sung-hoon as Na Pil-seung
- Oh Dong-min as Choi Jin-sang
- Song Ji-in as Teacher Oh
- Seo Sang-won as Professor Bong
- Park Sun-hee as Professor Noh

== Awards and nominations ==
Year	Award	Category	Nominee	Result
2018	32nd KBS Drama Awards	Excellence Award, Actor in a One-Act/Special/Short Drama	Park Sung-hoon	Nominated
2018	32nd KBS Drama Awards	Excellence Award, Actress in a One-Act/Special/Short Drama	Jeon So-min	Nominated
