= Jun Ik-ryoung =

South Korean actress (born 1978)

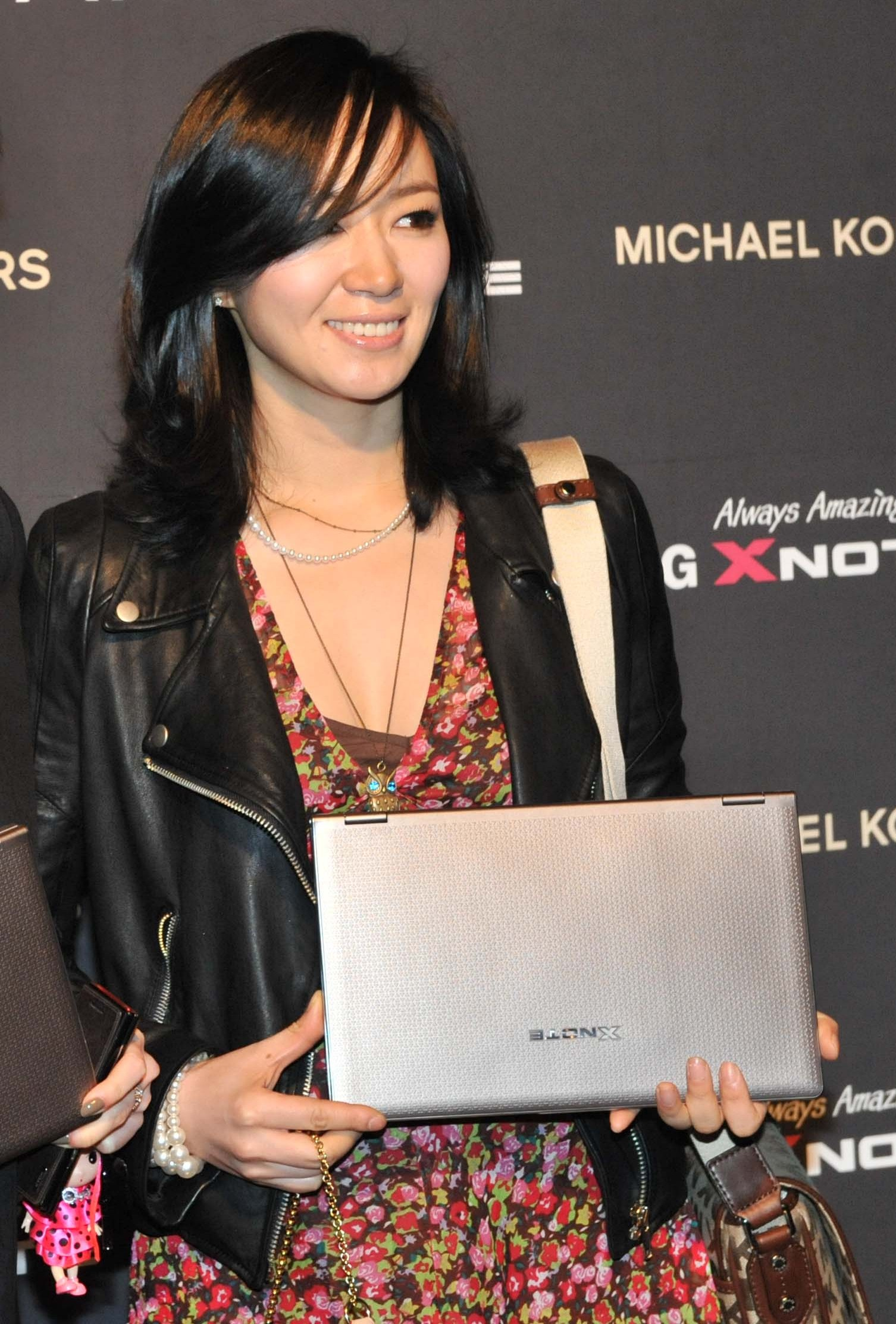
- Jun in 2010
- Born: July 26, 1978 (age 48); South Korea
- Education: Chung-Ang University – Theater and Film
- Occupation: Actress
- Years active: 2001–present

Korean name
- Hangul: 전익령
- RR: Jeon Ikryeong
- MR: Chŏn Ingnyŏng

Jun Ik-ryoung (Korean: 전익령; born July 26, 1978) is a South Korean actress. After her debut, she used the stage name Jeon Ye-seo for a while, but has been using her real name since 2011.

== Filmography ==
=== Television series ===
Year	Title	Role	Network
2003	Jewel in the Palace		MBC
2004	Immortal Admiral Yi Sun-sin	Chung-hyang	KBS1
2005	KBS TV Novel: "Hometown Station"	Chae Sun-kyung	KBS1
2006	Drama City: "Chunyoung"		KBS2
2007	Drama City: "A Death Messenger With Amnesia"		KBS2
2007	Lucifer	Oh Seung-hee	KBS2
2007	Belle	Oh Hyang-sook	KBS1
2008	Life Special Investigation Team	Yoon Ji-eun (cameo, episodes 9, 10)	MBC
2010	The Great Merchant	Baek Jo-rye	KBS1
2010	KBS Drama Special: "Texas Hit"		KBS2
2010	KBS Drama Special: "Just Say It!"	Ham Kye-shin	KBS2
2011	Indomitable Daughters-in-Law	Park Se-ryung	MBC
2012	KBS Drama Special: "Gate of Non-Duality"	Hae-jung	KBS2
2012	KBS Drama Special: "My Prettiest Moments"	Lee Shin-ae	KBS2
2013	The Suspicious Housekeeper	Writer Kwon (cameo)	SBS
2014	Jeong Do-jeon	Lady Jang	KBS1
2015	Enchanting Neighbor	Seo Bong-hee	SBS
2017	Good Manager	Chief Lee's wife	KBS2
2018	Still 17	Kim Hyun-jin	SBS

=== Film ===
Year	Title	Role	Notes/Ref.
2002	Who Are You?		
2003	Runaway		short film
2003	Float in the air		short film
2005	Possible Changes		
2010	The Most Beautiful Picnic in The World	Documentary writer	unreleased
2013	Meet a Life Companion		short film
2016	A Man and a Woman	Hyo-seon	
2024	Noise	Jeong-in in room 804	

== Awards and nominations ==
Year	Award	Category	Nominated work	Result
2006	KBS Drama Awards	Excellence Award, Actress in a One-Act/Special/Short Drama	Chunyoung	Nominated
2007	KBS Drama Awards	Excellence Award, Actress in a One-Act/Special/Short Drama	A Death Messenger With Amnesia	Won
2012	KBS Drama Awards	Excellence Award, Actress in a One-Act/Special/Short Drama	My Prettiest Moments, Gate of Non-Duality	Nominated
