= Im Ji-kyu =

South Korean actor

- Born: March 7, 1978 (age 48); Busan, South Korea
- Education: Kosin University – Mathematics
- Occupation: Actor
- Years active: 2004–present
- Agent: Blue Dragon Entertainment
- Spouse: Park Ye-son (m. 2014)

Korean name
- Hangul: 임지규
- RR: Im Jigyu
- MR: Im Chigyu

Im Ji-kyu (born March 7, 1978) is a South Korean actor. He is best known for his leading roles in the indie films Who's That Knocking at My Door?, Milky Way Liberation Front, and Magic. Im also played supporting roles in the television romantic comedies Queen of Reversals and The Greatest Love.

== Personal life ==
Im Ji-kyu married Park Ye-son, his girlfriend of four years, in a small private wedding in Seoul on May 17, 2014. He met his wife, a lawyer, at church.

== Filmography ==
=== Film ===
Year	Title	Role	Notes
2004	Fingerprint		short film
2007	Who's That Knocking at My Door?	Min Je-hwi	
2007	Milky Way Liberation Front	Young-jae	
2008	In the Boutique		short film
2008	Scandal Makers	Park Sang-yoon	
2009	Bubble Wrap	Sung-taek	short film
2009	One Step More to the Sea	Waiter	
2009	White Night	Yak-tong	
2010	Read My Lips	Church youth	
2010	Magic	Myeong-jin	
2011	Children...	Dong-chul	
2012	Helpless	Stalker	
2012	Spring, Snow	Young-jae	
2012	The Peach Tree	cameo	
2013	Precious Love	On-yoo	
2017	A Day	Yong-sun	
2021	Dark Yellow		short film

=== Television series ===
Year	Title	Role	Network
2007	High Kick!	(guest, episode 99)	MBC
2008	Tazza	Sung-Chan	SBS
2009	Partner	Jung Jae-ho (guest, episodes 1-3)	KBS2
2010	Roller Coaster Plus Date Big Bang	Im Ji-kyu	tvN
2010	KBS Drama Special – "Cutting Off the Heart"	Jae-woo	KBS2
2010	Queen of Reversals	Kang-Woo	MBC
2011	The Greatest Love	Kim Jae-seok	MBC
2012	Phantom	Byun Sang-woo	SBS
2012	KBS Drama Special – "Do You Know Taekwondo?"	Yoon Do-hyeon	KBS2
2013	The Suspicious Housekeeper	Eun Se-kyul's homeroom teacher	SBS
2014	God's Gift: 14 Days	Ryu Jin-woo	SBS
2014	Turning Point	Kim Young-bok	MBC
2014	The King's Face	Heo Gyun	KBS2
2015	Assembly	Shim Dong-chun	KBS2
2015	I'm After You	Secretary Min	SBS
2016	The Doctors	Gunman	SBS
2016	Still Loving You	Park Hyeong-sik	KBS1
2017	Man to Man	(guest)	JTBC
2017	Go Back	Park Hyeon-seok	KBS2
2018	Radio Romance	Lee Seung-soo	KBS2
2018	Your House Helper	Oh Yoon-gi	KBS2
2018	Fates & Furies	Assistant Kim	SBS
2019	Her Private Life	Kang Seung-min	tvN
2019	When the Devil Calls Your Name	Kyung-Soo	tvN
2019	I Wanna Hear Your Song	Yi-young's blind date (Cameo, Ep. 10)	KBS2
2020	18 Again	Ji Hoon's older brother (Cameo)	JTBC
2021	The Uncanny Counter	Dong-pal (Cameo, Ep.15)	OCN
2021	Sell Your Haunted House	Kim Byeong-ho	KBS2
2021–2022	The King of Tears, Lee Bang-won	King Woo	KBS1
2023	Divorce Attorney Shin	Park Hyun-tae	JTBC

=== Web series ===
Year	Title	Role	Platform
2022	Kiss Sixth Sense	Young Adult Kim Hae-jin (Cameo, Ep. 11-12)	Disney+

== Awards and nominations ==
Year	Award	Category	Nominated work	Result
2008	17th Buil Film Awards	Best New Actor	Milky Way Liberation Front, Who's That Knocking at My Door?	Won
2012	KBS Drama Awards	Best Actor in a One-Act Drama/Special	Do You Know Taekwondo?	Nominated
