= Park Soo-young =

Park Soo-young (Korean: 박수영) may refer to:

- Park Soo-young (actor)
- Park Soo-young (entertainer)
- Park Soo-young (singer)
