= Lee Chae-kyung =

South Korean television and film actress (born 1975)

- Born: January 22, 1975 (age 51); Ulsan
- Other name: Lee Chae-kyeong
- Occupations: Actress; theater actor; musical actor
- Years active: 1998–present
- Agent: YK Media Plus

Korean name
- Hangul: 이채경
- RR: I Chaegyeong
- MR: I Ch'aegyŏng

Lee Chae-kyung (Korean: 이채경; born on 22 January 1975) is a South Korean actress. She made her acting debut in 1998 in theater, and since then, she has appeared in a number of plays, films and television series. She got recognition for her supporting roles in Hotel del Luna, The Crowned Clown (2019), Love Scene Number, Jirisan and Moonshine (2021). She has acted in films such as Overman (2015) and #ALIVE (2020) among others.

== Career ==
Lee Chae-kyung has had an exclusive contract with artist management company YK Media Plus since August 2021.

She was active as a musical actor in the Seoul Arts Troupe (2000–2007). In 2016, she appeared in the TV series Love in the Moonlight, Guardian: The Lonely and Great God and Dr. Romantic.

== Personal life and education ==
Lee was Born in Sinjeong-dong, Nam-gu, Ulsan. She graduated from JoongAng Girls' Middle and High School and University of Ulsan.

== Filmography ==
=== Films ===
Year	Title	Role	Notes	Ref.
2012	Horror Stories	Ghost, elder sister	Segment: "Don't Answer to the Door"	
2015	Overman	Psychiatrist		
2015	Georgia	Mother	Short film	
2017	Hide and Seek	tenant, mother	Short film	
2020	Alive	Zombified wife of the masked man		
2022	Mother and Daughter	Sang-soon	23rd JIFF	

=== Television series ===
Year	Title	Role	Notes	Ref.
2015	Save the Family	Song Woo-sik's wife		
2015	She Was Pretty	Children's book author		
2016	Signal	Lee Soon-yeong		
2016	Beautiful Gong Shim	Joon-pyo's real mother		
2016	W	Registered Nurse		
2016	Hello, My Twenties!	Cooking Professor		
2016	Love in the Moonlight	Court lady Kim		
2016	Guardian: The Lonely and Great God	Manager Jang Il-ok		
2017	Voice	Do Mi-yeong		
2017	Tomorrow, with You			
2017	Queen of Mystery	Lee Myeong-hee		
2017	Bad Thief, Good Thief	Teacher		
2017	Sisters-in-Law	Publishing company president		
2017	School 2017	Go Hak-joong's mother		
2017	Live Up to Your Name	Yeon-kyeong's mother		
2017	Hospital Ship	Head Nurse		
2017	Girls' Generation 1979	Son Jin's mother		
2017	Because This Is My First Life			
2017	Witch at Court	Hong Seon-hwa		
2017	Avengers Social Club			
2018	Tempted			
2018	A Poem a Day	Kim Seong-hee		
2018	Life	Min-seo's mother		
2018	Gangnam Beauty	Team Leader		
2018	100 Days My Prince	Court Lady		
2018	The Third Charm	Civil Complaint Head of Department		
2019	The Crowned Clown	Head		
2019	Her Private Life	Choi Eun-hye		
2019	Search: WWW	Executive Director		
2019	Hotel del Luna	Hotel CEO		
2019	Class of Lies	Judge		
2019	I Wanna Hear Your Song	Kim Soo-in		
2020	365: Repeat the Year	Kim Soo-yeon		
2020	The King: Eternal Monarch	Great Democratic Party Member of National Assembly		
2020	Stranger	Butler	Season 2	
2020	Lie After Lie	Prison Guard		
2020	KBS Drama Special: "A Jaunt"		Season 11, Epi. 7	
2021	Love Scene Number	President of Guleum Cinema	Love Scene #35	
2021	Sell Your Haunted House	Secretary Choi Sun-mi		
2021	Jirisan	Il-man's wife		
2021	KBS Drama Special: "The Palace"	Court Lady Choi	Season 12, Epi. 7	
2021–2022	Moonshine	Jo Haeng-soo		
2023	Our Blooming Youth	Shaman		

=== Theater ===
Year	Title	Role	Notes/Ref.
1999	Empress Myeongseong	Shaman	
2002	Typhoon	Aerial	
2004	Summer Night's Dream	Nanu	
2005	Romeo and Juliet	Queen of Maps	
2006	Country of Wind	Ga-hee	
2007	Subway Line 1	Golga	
2009	Mister Joe	Shalala	
2010	The Palace	Hyejeonggung	
2012	When Smoke Gets into Your Eyes	Kang Mi-hee	

== Awards and nominations ==
Year	Award	Category	Nominated work	Result	Ref.
2020	4th Ulsan Short Film Festival	Best Acting Award	Georgia	Won	
2020	23rd Short Shorts International Short Film Festival Nangboda	Best Acting Award	Georgia	Won	
2021	4th Jeonju International Short Film Festival	Best Actress	Georgia	Won	
2022	8th Seoul Webfest Film Festival	Best Actress / Actor (shorts)	Georgia	Pending	
