= Seo Yea-ji =

South Korean actress (born 1990)

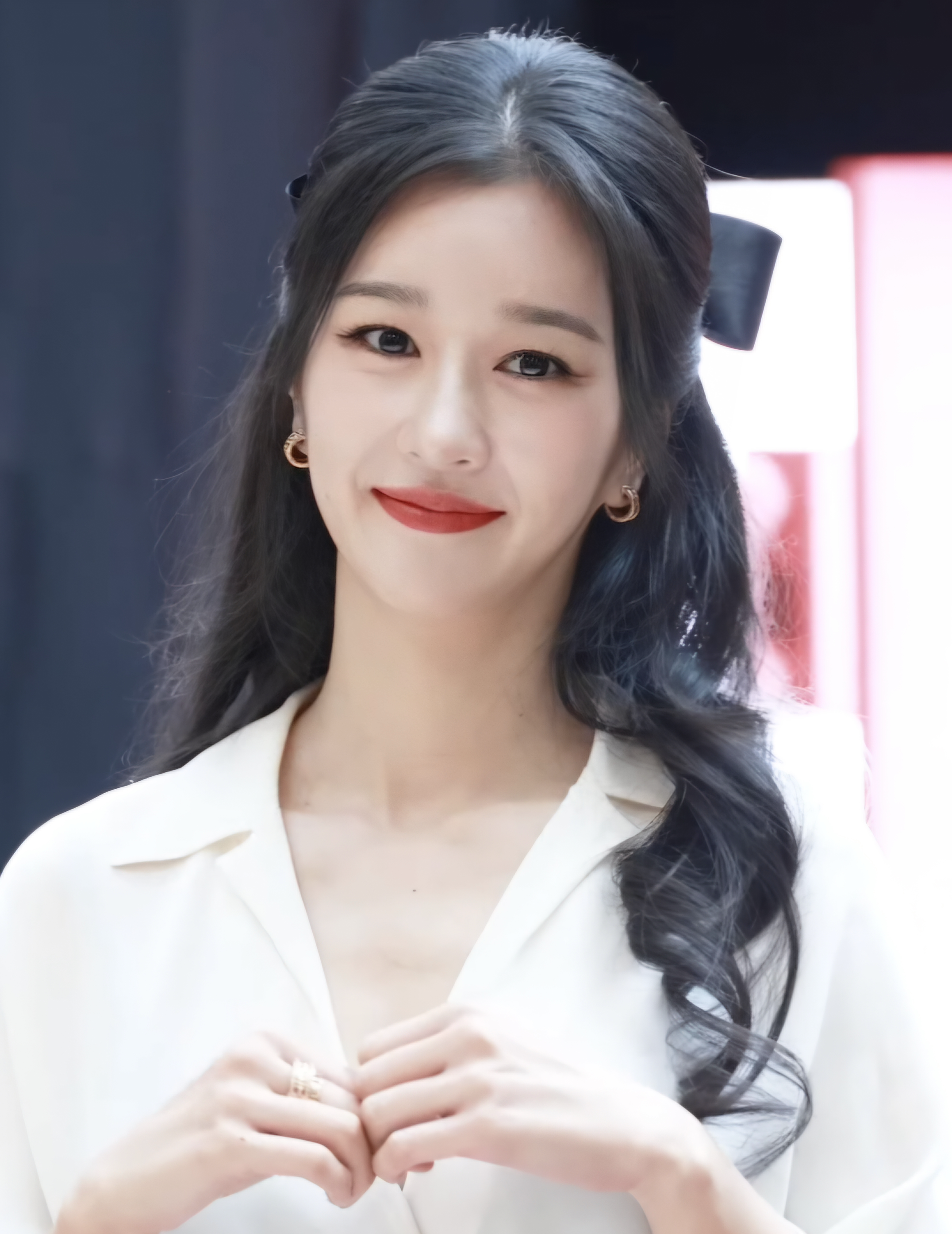
- Seo in 2024
- Born: April 6, 1990 (age 36); Seoul, South Korea
- Occupation: Actress
- Years active: 2013–present
- Agent: B.Wave Entertainment

Korean name
- Hangul: 서예지
- RR: Seo Yeji
- MR: Sŏ Yeji

Signature
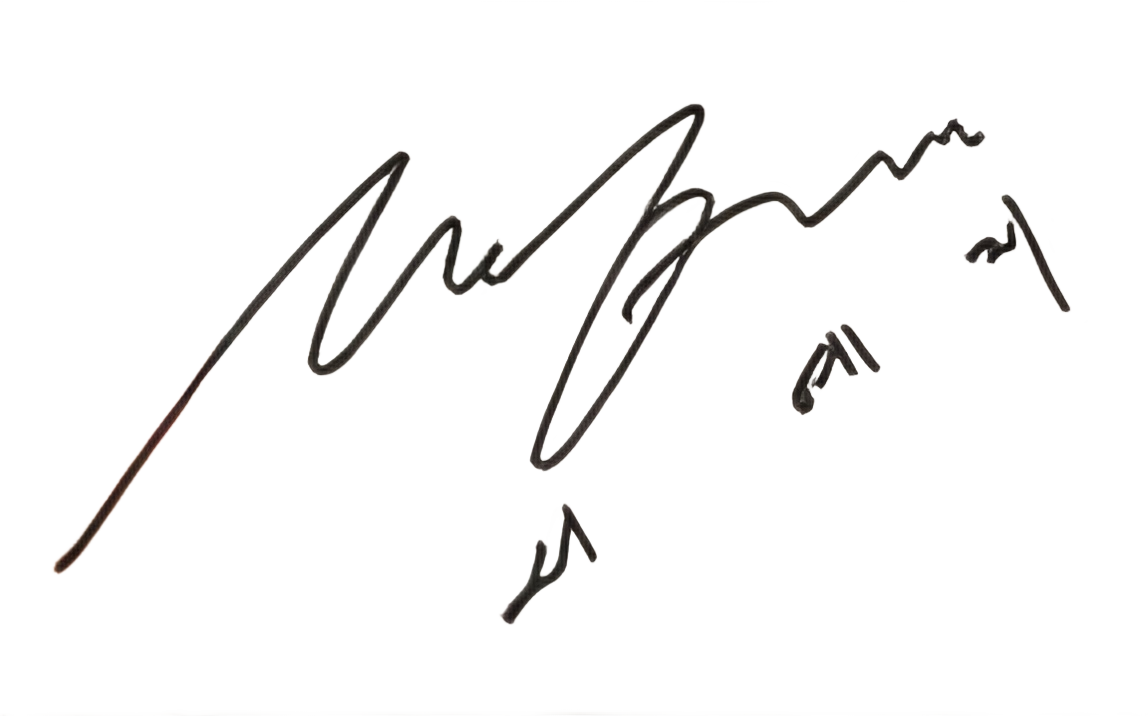

Seo Yea-ji (Korean: 서예지; born April 6, 1990) is a South Korean actress. She began her acting career in the sitcom Potato Star 2013QR3 (2013–2014). This was followed by major roles in period drama Diary of a Night Watchman (2014), thriller Last (2015), and fantasy Moorim School: Saga of the Brave (2016). Her notable lead roles in television series include Save Me (2017) and Lawless Lawyer (2018). She rose to prominence with the romantic comedy It's Okay to Not Be Okay (2020).

== Career ==
=== 2013–2016: Debut and diverse roles ===
Seo had no plans to pursue a career in acting but things took a different turn when she caught the attention of the CEO of her then-management company, Made in Chan Entertainment, who persuaded her to venture into acting. In March 2013, she stepped in the entertainment industry by appearing in an advertisement for SK Telecom. In May 2013, she featured in the Samsung Galaxy S4 short film Love essaying the role of Min-joo. She debuted as an actress in the tvN sitcom Potato Star 2013QR3 which aired for 120 episodes from September 23, 2013, to May 15, 2014.

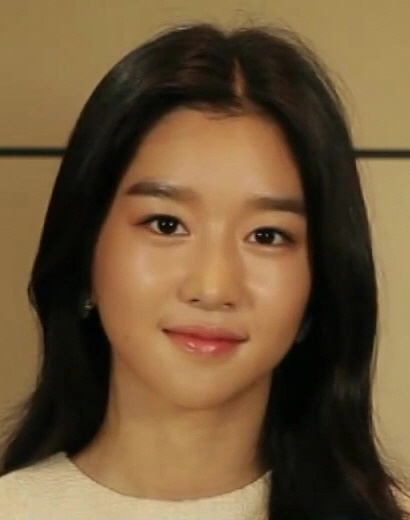
Seo in 2015

She next starred in the MBC historical drama Diary of a Night Watchman (2014) where she essayed a major role for which she was nominated at the 2014 MBC Drama Awards in the Best New Actress category. This was followed by her appearance in tvN television series Super Daddy Yeol (2015) and notable JTBC television series Last (2015) starring as a civil servant.

After capturing viewers' attention through her drama Last, Seo made her debut on the big screen with the hit historical drama film The Throne (2015) where she played the role of Queen Jeongsun. This was followed by her film Circle of Atonement (2015). She also appeared in the music video of South Korean boy band Big Bang titled "Let's Not Fall In Love" (2015).

In 2016, she played one of the main characters in the KBS drama Moorim School: Saga of the Brave (2016) and marked next big-screen project with the film Seondal: The Man Who Sells the River (2016) in a supporting role. This was followed by supporting role in the KBS drama Hwarang: The Poet Warrior Youth (2016–17).

Following the expiration of her contract with her management company in 2016, Seo left Made in Chan Entertainment and became associated with King Entertainment.

=== 2017–present: Another Way and rising popularity ===
Starting of 2017 was marked by Seo's first leading role in the film Another Way (2017) which dealt with the issue of suicide pacts. Seo was praised from viewers as "New Thriller Queen" when she starred in OCN thriller mystery television series Save Me (2017).

She then starred in world's 1st 4DX VR Film Stay With Me (2018) opposite Kim Jung-hyun. She played a role of lawyer who finds it hard to control her temper in the tvN drama Lawless Lawyer (2018) alongside Lee Joon-gi. The series was a commercial hit and became one of the most highly rated Korean dramas in cable television history.

In 2019, she starred in the films Warning: Do Not Play and By Quantum Physics: A Nightlife Venture.

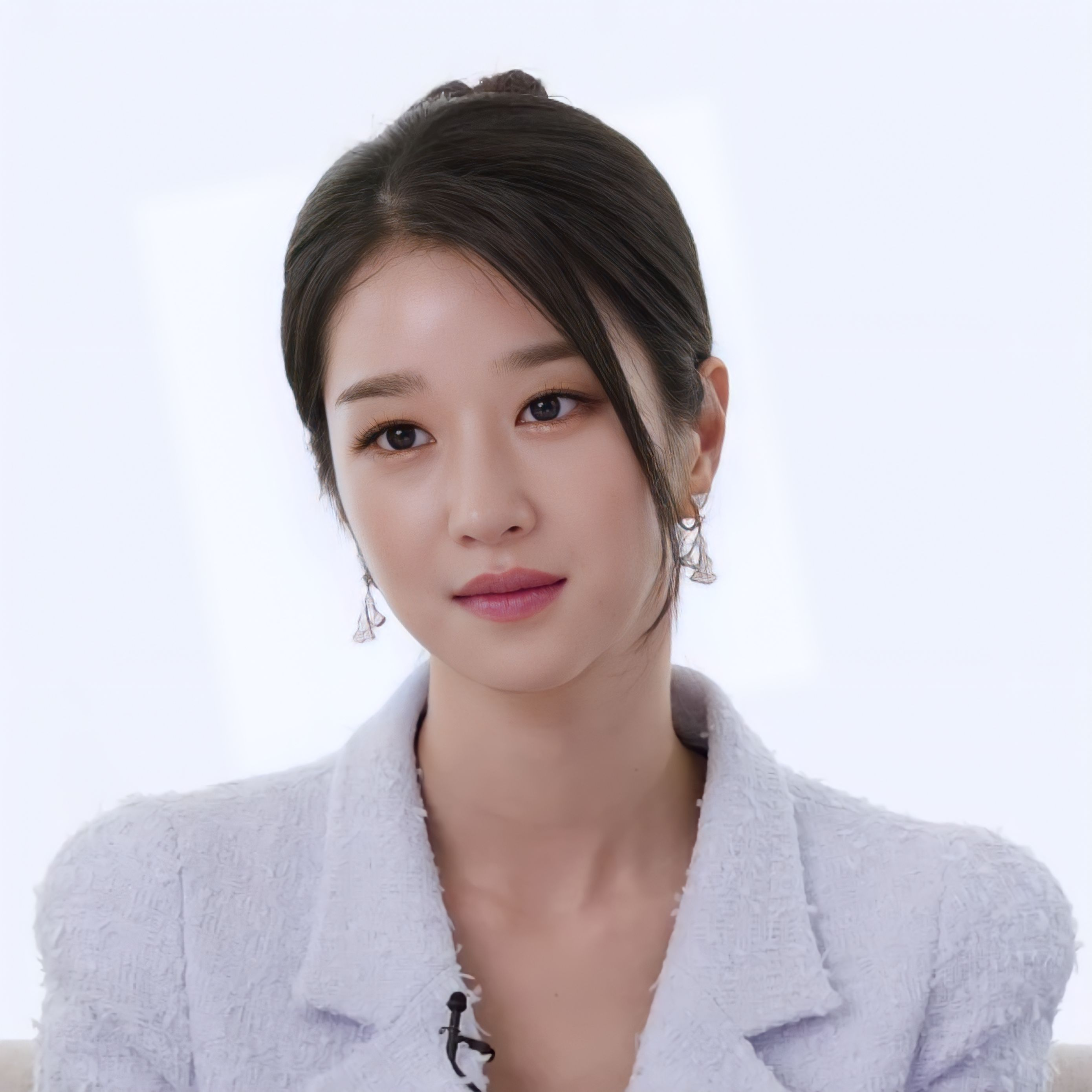
Seo in 2020

On January 1, 2020, Seo joined newly established entertainment agency Gold Medalist.

Seo's first venture with her new management company came with tvN and Netflix broadcast romantic comedy It's Okay to Not Be Okay (2020). She starred opposite Kim Soo-hyun and featured in the role of a bestselling children's book author who has a personality disorder. Her portrayal of the character was critically acclaimed by Manila Bulletin, The Hindu, and The New York Times named the series one of "The Best International Shows of 2020" and called Seo's performance as "mesmerizing". Seo also experienced a substantial rise in popularity and attracted media attention in Korea and internationally.

In 2021, she starred in a mystery-thriller film Recalled, directed by Seo Yoo-min alongside Kim Kang-woo which was a resounding success. It topped local box office on its opening weekend. In December 2021, Seo renewed her contract with the Gold Medalist.

In 2022, Seo starred in the tvN melodrama Eve.

On November 30, 2023, Gold Medalist shared that Seo would be leaving the agency following her contract expiration.

In June 2024, Seo signed with new agency Sublime.

In January 2026, Seo made her theater debut in Crying for You as Yun Sim-deok. On July 16, she signed an exclusive contract with B.Wave Entertainment. In November 2026, Seo was set to return to the big screen after six-year hiatus with the upcoming horror fiction film Geumwoldo.

== Other ventures ==
=== Ambassadorship ===
In December 2018, Seo was appointed as an honorary police officer by the Korean National Police Agency for capturing the police's activities through movies and dramas.

=== Endorsements ===
Seo became advertising model for health and beauty brand Inner Flora, health and lifestyle brands New Origin and Yuhan Care, mask brand Aer, sunglasses brand Rieti, and cosmetics brand Luna. Seo also appeared in CF series for Naver Webtoon.

== Personal life ==
In April 2021, Seo was accused of being the reason behind Kim Jung-hyun's behavior at a 2018 press conference for The Time and his exit from the series. On April 12, South Korean local tabloid Dispatch revealed alleged text messages between Kim Jung-hyun and Seo, which showed the actress demanding Kim to refrain from any physical contact with female actors in the drama The Time. She allegedly told him to get the romantic scenes deleted from the script. He eventually quit in the middle of production citing eating and sleeping disorders.

In response, Seo's agency, Gold Medalist, denied the claim that she was the reason behind Kim's behaviour and abrupt exit from the series. They argued that "it is unreasonable to assume that a lead actor would make a decision that would jeopardize his career without free will", adding that they "confirmed" this with Kim Jung-hyun. The agency argued that messages exchanged between them were "very misleading" and were "merely jealous quarrels about shooting scenes". Amid these allegations, Seo withdrew from the ongoing production of the Korean drama Island. According to the production, her character would be recast and rewritten.

In May 2021, Kim Jung-hyun revealed that he had ended his contract with his agency, whom he accused of forcing the 2018 press conference on him despite his health problems. Kim added that he would pursue legal action against the agency for putting up false claims against him since that event. In addition, Kim also denied Seo has any involvement in how he acted, reiterating the issues on his health problems and company's mistreatment.

== Filmography ==
Key
†	Denotes films that have not yet been released

=== Film ===
Year	Title	Role	Notes	Ref.
2013	Love	Min-joo	short film	
2015	The Throne	Queen Jeongsun		
2015	Circle of Atonement	Kang Yoo-shin		
2016	Seondal: The Man Who Sells the River	Gyu-young		
2017	Another Way	Jung-won		
2017	The Bros	Sa-ra	Special appearance	
2018	Stay With Me	Yeon-soo	4DX VR film (also known as Meet the Memories - First Love)	
2019	Warning: Do Not Play	Mi-jung		
2019	By Quantum Physics: A Nightlife Venture	Seong Eun-yeong		
2021	Recalled	Soo-jin		
2027	Geumwoldo †	Kim Ji-hoo		

=== Television series ===
Year	Title	Role	Notes	Ref.
2013	Potato Star 2013QR3	Noh Soo-young		
2014	Diary of a Night Watchman	Park Soo-ryeon		
2014	KBS Drama Special – "The Three Female Runaways"	Soo-ji	One-act drama	
2014	Drama Festival – "Gabon"	Kyung Hee	One-act drama	
2015	Super Daddy Yeol	Hwang Ji-hye		
2015	Last	Shin Na-ra		
2016	Moorim School: Saga of the Brave	Shim Soon-duk		
2016	Another Miss Oh	Oh Seo-hee	Cameo (Episode 15)	
2016	Hwarang: The Poet Warrior Youth	Princess Sook-myung		
2017	Save Me	Im Sang-mi		
2018	Lawless Lawyer	Ha Jae-yi		
2020	It's Okay to Not Be Okay	Ko Mun-yeong		
2022	Eve	Lee La-el		

=== Television shows ===
Year	Title	Role	Notes	Ref.
2015	World Changing Quiz	MC	Also known as Three Wheels	

=== Web show ===
Year	Title	Role	Notes	Ref.
2025	SNL Korea Reboot	Cast member	Season 7	

=== Music video appearances ===
Year	Song title	Artist	Ref.
2015	"Let's Not Fall in Love"	Big Bang	

== Theatre ==
Year	Title	Role	Ref.
2026	Crying for You	Yun Sim-deok	

== Awards and nominations ==
Name of the award ceremony, year presented, category, nominee of the award, and the result of the nomination
Award ceremony	Year	Category	Nominee / Work	Result	Ref.
APAN Star Awards	2021	Excellence Award, Actress in a Miniseries	It's Okay to Not Be Okay	Won	
APAN Star Awards	2021	Popular Star Award, Actress	It's Okay to Not Be Okay	Won	
APAN Star Awards	2021	KT Seezn Star Award	Seo Yea-ji	Nominated	
Asia Artist Awards	2020	Best Artist Award	It's Okay to Not Be Okay	Won	
Asia Artist Awards	2020	AAA Hot Issue Award	Seo Yea-ji	Won	
Baeksang Arts Awards	2017	Most Popular Actress – Film	Another Way	Nominated	
Baeksang Arts Awards	2021	Best Actress – Television	It's Okay to Not Be Okay	Nominated	
Baeksang Arts Awards	2021	Most Popular Actress	Seo Yea-ji	Won	
Brand of the Year Awards	2020	Actress of the Year	Seo Yea-ji	Won	
Buil Film Awards	2020	Popular Star Award	By Quantum Physics: A Nightlife Venture	Won	
MBC Drama Awards	2014	Best New Actress	Diary of a Night Watchman	Nominated	
Soompi Awards	2019	Actress of the Year	Lawless Lawyer	Nominated	
