= Recalled (film) =

2021 South Korean mystery-thriller film

- Theatrical release poster
- Hangul: 내일의 기억
- Hanja: 來日의 記憶
- RR: Naeirui gieok
- MR: Naeirŭi kiŏk
- Directed by: Seo Yoo-min
- Written by: Seo Yoo-min
- Produced by: Jeong Hye-on
- Starring: Seo Yea-ji; Kim Kang-woo; Yeom Hye-ran; Kim Kang-hoon; Sung Hyuk; Kim Joo-ryoung
- Cinematography: Kim Gi-tae
- Edited by: Kim Sun-min
- Music by: Kim Jun-seong; Lee Geon-ho
- Production companies: Tori Pictures; iFilm Corporation
- Distributed by: CJ CGV; Finecut
- Release date: April 21, 2021
- Running time: 99 minutes
- Country: South Korea
- Language: Korean
- Box office: est. US$2.56 million

Recalled (Korean: 내일의 기억; RR: Naeirui gieok; lit. Memories of Tomorrow) is a 2021 South Korean mystery-thriller film directed by Seo Yoo-min and starring Seo Yea-ji, Kim Kang-woo and Yeom Hye-ran. The film is about a woman who starts seeing her future after losing her memory. The film was released on April 21, 2021.

According to Korean Film Council data, it ranks 15th among all the Korean films released in the year 2021 in South Korea, with gross of US$2.56 million and 335,025 admissions, as of December 12, 2021.

== Synopsis ==
Soo-jin (Seo Yea-ji) is involved in an accident and loses her memory. She begins to see the future and as illusions start becoming reality, her confusing memories bring her face-to-face with a truth about her husband Ji-hoon (Kim Kang-woo).

== Cast ==
- Seo Yea-ji as Soo-jin
- Kim Kang-woo as Ji-hoon
- Yeom Hye-ran
- Bae Yoo-ram as detective Bae
- Bae Je-ki
- Kim Kang-hoon
- Park Sang-wook as Ki-sang
- Sung Hyuk
- Kim Joo-ryoung
- Song Chang-gyoo as apartment security guard

== Production ==
=== Casting ===
On 7 March 2019, it was announced that Kim Kang-woo and Seo Yea-ji were reviewing the appearance in the film Remembrance of Tomorrow directed by Seo Yoo-min. On 7 May 2019 their casting in the film was confirmed. Park Sang-wook joined the cast as detective.

=== Filming ===
Principal photography began on May 2, 2019.

== Release ==
The film was released on April 21, 2021. In spite of ongoing controversies around Seo Yea-ji, the film with 33,012 advance reservation of admission tickets and reservation rate ranking of 36.6%, was ranked at number 1 on the eve of its release on April 20, 2021. The film was screened at 10th Korean Film Festival Frankfurt on October 23, 2021.

== Reception ==
=== Box office ===
The film was released on April 21, 2021 on 957 screens. It ranked at number 1 place at the Korean box office, on the opening day of its release, collecting 19,281 audience. The film maintained its number 1 rank on second day of its release with 18,235 audience. Recalled was at number 1 rank in the opening weekend of its release with 101,636 audiences for three days from April 23 to April 25 and recorded 136,040 cumulative audiences.

According to Korean Film Council data†, it is at 15th place among all the Korean films released in the year 2021, with gross of US$2.56 million and 335,025 admissions, as of as of December 12, 2021.

- †The system of KOBIS (Korean Box Office Information System) is managed by KOFIC.
