= Kim Jung-hyun (actor, born 1990) =

South Korean actor

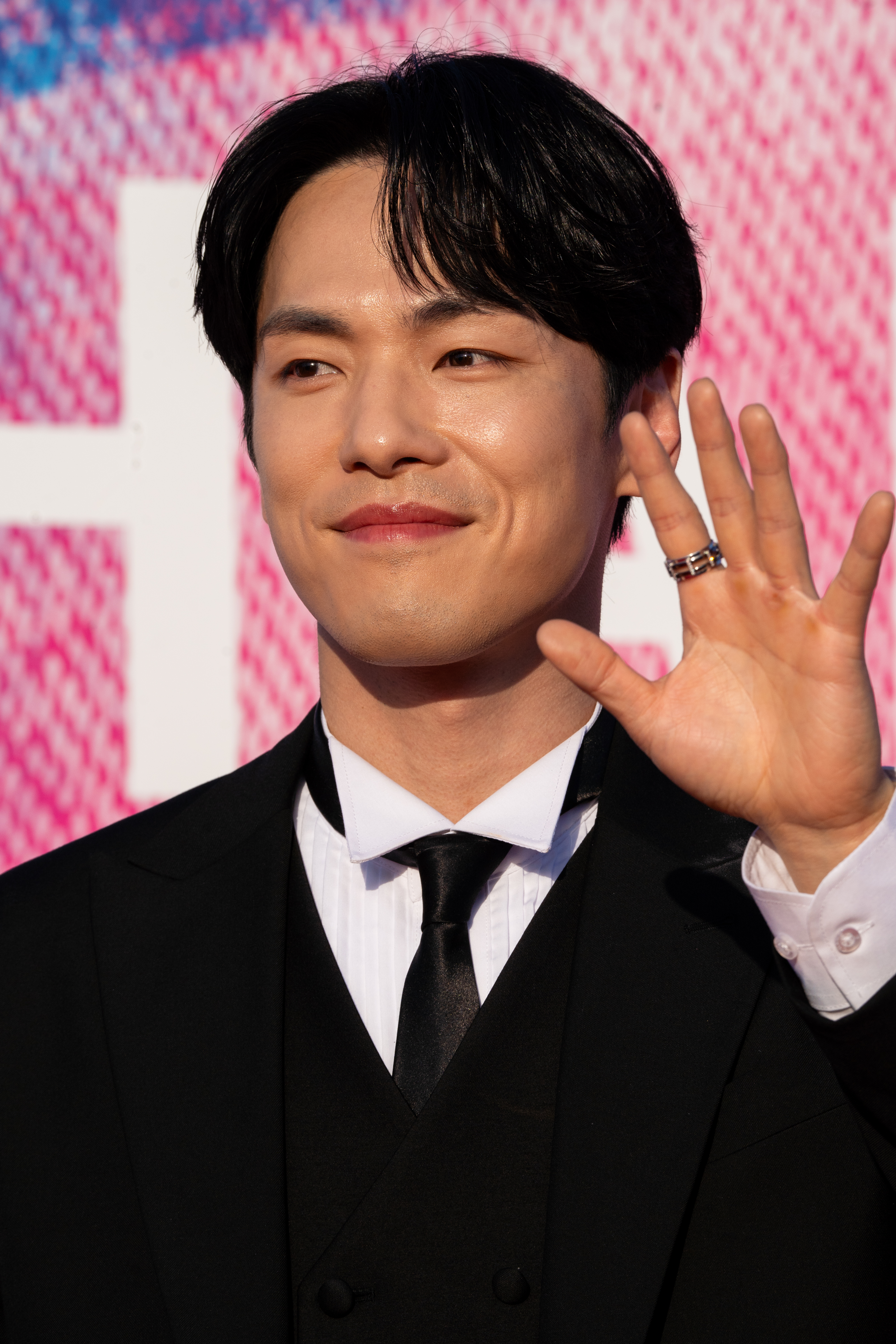
- Kim at the Yokohama International Film Festival in 2024
- Born: April 5, 1990 (age 36); Busan, South Korea
- Education: Korea National University of Arts (Department of Acting)
- Occupation: Actor
- Years active: 2015–present
- Agent: Management Seesun
- Height: 183 cm (6 ft 0 in)

Korean name
- Hangul: 김정현
- Hanja: 金正賢
- RR: Gim Jeonghyeon
- MR: Kim Chŏnghyŏn

Kim Jung-hyun (Korean: 김정현; born April 5, 1990) is a South Korean actor. He is best known for his lead roles in popular television series School 2017 (2017), Welcome to Waikiki (2018), and Time (2018). He gained international recognition by starring in the dramas Crash Landing on You (2019–2020) and Mr. Queen (2020–2021), which rank amongst the highest-rated Korean dramas in cable television history.

== Early life ==
Kim was born in Busan in South Korea. He majored in acting at the Korea National University of Arts.

== Career ==
=== 2015: Beginnings ===
After having acted in several musical theatre plays, Kim made his silver screen debut in the film Overman, which premiered at the 2015 Busan International Film Festival. This earned him Best New Actor nominations at 25th Buil Film Awards and 22nd Chunsa Film Art Awards.

=== 2016–2018: Rising popularity ===
Kim made his small screen debut in 2016 and gained attention with his role as Gong Hyo-jin's younger brother in the romance comedy Don't Dare to Dream.

He then starred in historical drama The Rebel. The series was a critical and commercial success, and Kim won the Best New Actor award at the 2017 MBC Drama Awards.

The same year, he was cast in MBC's two-episode series, Binggoo, alongside Han Sun-hwa.

He also played the male lead in KBS2's teen drama School 2017 alongside Gugudan's Kim Se-jeong. The series was very popular among the youth leading to his increased popularity. Kim's portrayal of a troubled and rebellious student was praised by critics and audiences. The series earned him Best New Actor nominations at the 54th Baeksang Arts Awards, the 2017 KBS Drama Awards and the 1st The Seoul Awards.

Kim then featured in 4Men's Music Video Break Up In The Morning.

Later in the year Kim was cast in a lead role in KBS2 drama special Buzzcut Love.

In 2018, Kim starred in JTBC's youth series titled Welcome to Waikiki playing a cynical but kind-hearted movie director. The series was popular across Asia and solidified Kim's status as a versatile actor.

He then starred in the 4DX VR movie Stay With Me alongside Seo Yea-ji playing the role of an aspiring musician with stage fright. Kim lent his vocals to the OST of the movie titled Moonlight.

In July 2018, he starred in MBC melodrama Time alongside Girls' Generation's Seohyun, playing a chaebol whose time is running out due to his failing health. During the press conference for the drama, he was criticised for "answering questions unenthusiastically" and for refusing to link arms with his co-star Seohyun. He explained that it was because he was trying to stay in his character from the drama. He withdrew from the series halfway through its run, officially citing health reasons.

=== 2019–present: Comeback and international fame ===
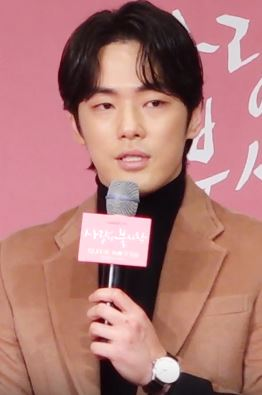
Kim in December 2019

Kim returned to television in December 2019 when he joined the tvN romance drama Crash Landing on You alongside Hyun Bin, Son Ye-jin and Seo Ji-hye. It became the highest-rated tvN drama and the third-highest-rated Korean drama in cable television history. Kim's portrayal of Goo Seung-joon, former fiancé of Yoon Se-ri (Son Ye-jin) and eventual love interest to Seo Dan (Seo Ji-hye), received positive reviews from audiences. His character's name "Goo Seung-joon" went on to trend at No. 1 in Korea's realtime search rankings, which he later described in an interview as incredibly rewarding.

In May 2020, Kim made a cameo appearance in his Crash Landing on You co-star Seo Ji-hye's drama Dinner Mate playing the role of her long-term boyfriend.

On June 5, 2020, it was confirmed that Kim would lead tvN's fusion sageuk drama, Mr. Queen alongside Shin Hye-sun playing the role of King Cheoljong. The drama aired from December 2020 to February 2021. On February 15, 2021, Mr. Queen became the seventh-highest-rated Korean drama in cable television history and the fifth highest rated tvN drama on record. The Korea Times article praised Kim's complex portrayal of the two-faced King and noted that he "left a deep impression on viewers with a heavy presence that took the center of the play." Kim contributed his vocals to the soundtrack with the song Like the First Snow; for which he also wrote the lyrics.

In September 2021, Kim signed with Story J Company followed by movie and drama casting news in 2022.

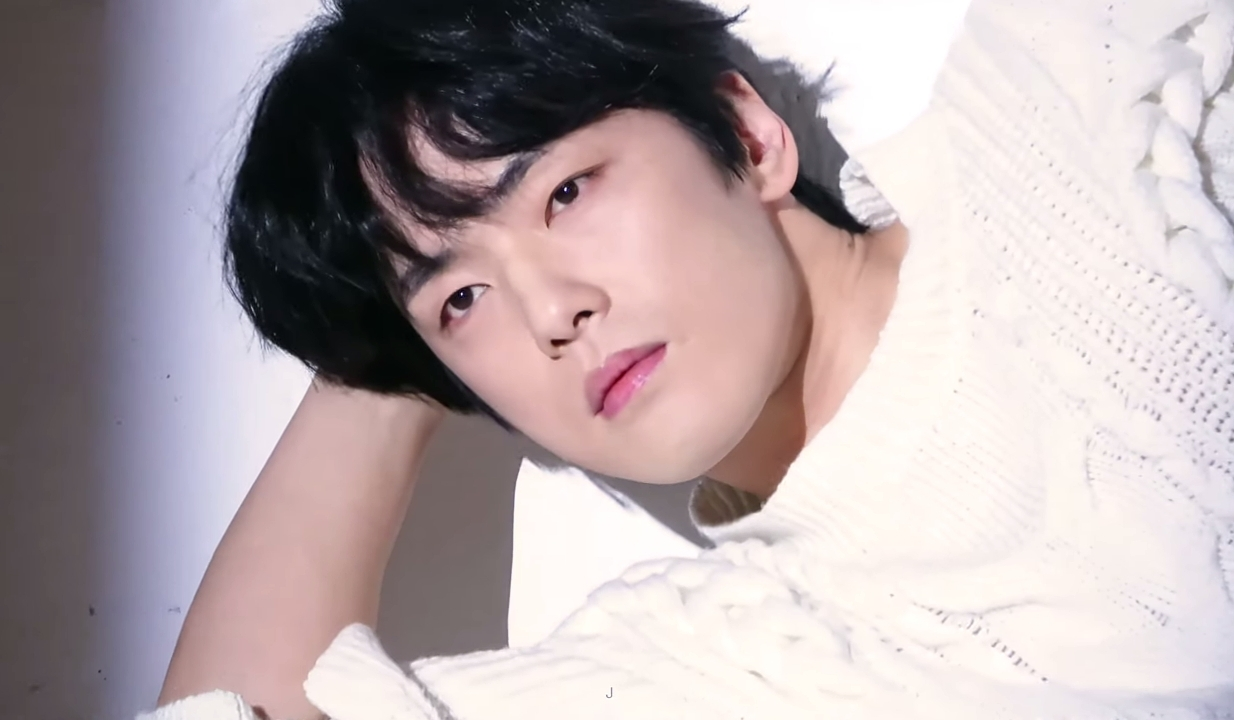
Kim in March 2022

In January 2022, his agency confirmed that he will appear as a Detective in an indie film called Se2cret.

In 2023, Kim returned to television with MBC's Kokdu: Season of Deity opposite actress Im Soo-hyang playing dual role of a Grim reaper and doctor. Kim received praise for 'Perfectly portraying two conflicting characters' through a variety of charms. He also lent his vocals to the opening theme song of the drama titled I am.

In March 2025, Kim officially parted ways with Story J Company after his exclusive contract expired, ending a four-year partnership that began in 2021.

In May 2025, Kim signed an exclusive contract with Management Seesun, a newly established agency that also manages his Mr. Queen co-stars Shin Hye-sun and Cha Chung-hwa, marking a new chapter in his career.

== Personal life ==
=== Military enlistment ===
Kim completed his mandatory military service as an assistant in Gangwon Province's 3rd division when he was 21 years old.

== Controversy ==
In April 2021, South Korean local tabloid Dispatch revealed alleged text messages between Kim and actress Seo Yea-ji and pointed out requests from Seo as the reason behind Kim's behaviour at the Time press conference. In response, Seo's agency, Gold Medalist, denied the claim that she was the reason behind Kim's behaviour and abrupt exit from the series. On April 14, he posted a personal handwritten apology.

On May 12, Kim's representative released a statement to announce the expiration of his contract with O& Entertainment and to address the actor's health condition while filming Time in 2018. Kim claimed that his agency had failed to fulfill their duty, and that he would take legal action against them for defamation and spreading false information. The same day, YTN revealed that they had obtained Kim's hospital records which showed that he was diagnosed with anxiety disorder, panic disorder, sleep disorder, and having depressive episodes. After the handwritten apology, he met Time director, Jang Jun-ho, who expressed his willingness to work with him again.

== Filmography ==
Key
†	Denotes films that have not yet been released

=== Film ===
Year	Title	Role	Notes	Ref.
2012	I'll Be with You	Jin-woo	Short film	
2014	The Beginning of Murder	Do-hyun	Short film	
2016	Going My Home	Lee Shi-joon	Short film	
2016	Overman	Choi Do-hyun	Independent film	
2017	One Day	Assistant manager Cha		
2018	Stay with Me	Woo-jin	4DX VR film	
2019	Rosebud	Woo-seong		
2021	Black Out: Mafia Game		Short film	
2023	Unforgivable	Detective Lee Dong-geun	Independent film	

=== Television series ===
Year	Title	Role	Notes	Ref.
2016	Don't Dare to Dream	Pyo Chi-yeol		
2017	The Rebel	Mo Ri		
2017	Frozen Love	Go Man-soo	Miniseries	
2017	School 2017	Hyun Tae-woon		
2017	Drama Special – The Love of a Buzz Cut	Bae Chi-hwan	One act-drama	
2018	Welcome to Waikiki	Kang Dong-gu		
2018	The Time	Cheon Soo-ho		
2019–2020	Crash Landing on You	Gu Seung-jun / Alberto Gu		
2020	Dinner Mate	Lee Young-dong	Cameo (Eps. 1–2)	
2020–2021	Mr. Queen	Lee Won-beom / King Cheoljong		
2023	Kokdu: Season of Deity	Kokdu / Do Jin-woo / Oh Hyun		
2024	Iron Family	Seo Kang-joo		
2025	A Hundred Memories	Jeong Hyeon	Special appearance	
2026	Siren's Kiss	Baek Jun-beom		
2026	Love in Disguise	Kim Si Hyun		

=== Music video appearances ===
Year	Song title	Artist	Ref.
2017	"Break Up in the Morning"	4Men	

== Discography ==
=== Soundtrack appearances ===
Title	Year	Album
"Moonlight"	2018	Stay with Me OST
"Like the First Snow"	2021	Mr. Queen OST
"I Am"	2023	Kokdu: Season of Deity OST

== Theatre ==
Year	Title	Role	Ref.
2013	경성아리랑 26년 Musical Arirang		
2013	Therese Raquin	Laurent LeClaire	
2015	조그만 입술		
2015	가야십이지곡 Gayashib i Jigok Musical		
2026	그 갈들 Those Days Musical	Jeonghak	

== Awards and nominations ==
Name of the award ceremony, year presented, category, nominee of the award, and the result of the nomination
Award ceremony	Year	Category	Nominee / Work	Result	Ref.
APAN Star Awards	2021	Best Supporting Actor	Crash Landing on You	Nominated	
APAN Star Awards	2024	Top Excellence Award, Actor in a Serial Drama	Iron Family	Nominated	
Asia Artist Awards	2020	Popularity Award (Actor)	Kim Jung-hyun	Nominated	
Baeksang Arts Awards	2018	Best New Actor – Television	School 2017	Nominated	
Buil Film Awards	2016	Best New Actor	Overman	Nominated	
Chunsa Film Art Awards	2017	Best New Actor	Overman	Nominated	
KBS Drama Awards	2017	Best New Actor	School 2017	Nominated	
KBS Drama Awards	2017	Netizen Award, Male	School 2017	Nominated	
KBS Drama Awards	2017	Best Couple Award (with Kim Se-jeong)	School 2017	Nominated	
KBS Drama Awards	2024	Top Excellence Award, Actor	Iron Family	Won	
KBS Drama Awards	2024	Best Couple Award (with Keum Sae-rok)	Iron Family	Won	
KBS Drama Awards	2024	Grand Prize (Daesang)	Iron Family	Nominated	
KBS Drama Awards	2024	Excellence Award, Actor in a Serial Drama	Iron Family	Nominated	
KBS Drama Awards	2024	Popularity Award, Actor	Iron Family	Nominated	
MBC Drama Awards	2017	Best New Actor	The Rebel	Won	
MBC Drama Awards	2018	Best Couple Award (with Seohyun)	Time	Nominated	
Soompi Awards	2018	Best Couple Award (with Kim Se-jeong)	School 2017	Nominated	
Soompi Awards	2018	Breakout Actor Award	School 2017	Nominated	
The Seoul Awards	2017	Best New Actor (Drama)	School 2017	Nominated	
