= Warning: Do Not Play =

2019 South Korean horror film

- Theatrical release poster
- Hangul: 암전
- RR: Amjeon
- MR: Amjŏn
- Directed by: Kim Jin-won
- Written by: Kim Jin-won
- Produced by: Jo Yoon-jin; Lee Yoon-jin; Won Jung-sim
- Starring: Seo Yea-ji; Jin Seon-kyu
- Cinematography: Yoon Young-soo
- Production companies: Tonic Project; INEW Company
- Distributed by: The Contents On; Finecut Co., Ltd. (International sales)
- Release date: 15 August 2019 (South Korea)
- Running time: 86 minutes
- Country: South Korea
- Language: Korean

Warning: Do Not Play (Korean: 암전; RR: Amjeon) is a 2019 South Korean horror/mystery film starring Seo Yea-ji and Jin Seon-kyu.

== Plot ==
Park Mi-jung (Seo Yea-ji), a rookie horror movie director, wanted to make her next movie. In the preparing process, she heard about a banned horror movie from 8 years ago, directed by Kim Jae-hyun (Jin Seon-kyu). Mi-jung decided to find out what happened in the past, expecting that it might give some inspiration for her upcoming movie.

== Cast ==
- Seo Yea-ji as Park Mi-jung
- Jin Seon-kyu as Kim Jae-hyun
- Kim Bo-ra as Kim Ji-soo.
- Cha Yup as Cha Kwang-bae.
- Ji Yoon-ho as Kim Joon-seo
- Jo Jae-young as Jo Young-min
- Seo Suk-kyu as Senior Colleague Kang
- Kim Jae-in as actress Mi-jung
- Yoon Jung-ro as Movie company producer
- Kim Mi-kyung as Professor in Film department (cameo)
- Nam Tae-boo as grilled clam restaurant Sung-Tae
- Shin So-I as audience member
- Cha Woo-jin as male college student
