= Love in Disguise (TV series) =

2026 South Korean television series

- Promotional poster
- Hangul: 나의 유죄인간
- Lit.: My Guilty Human
- RR: Naui yujoe ingan
- MR: Naŭi yujoe in'gan
- Genre: Workplace; Romantic comedy
- Based on: Why You Don't Know It's a Girl? by: Lee A-yeon; Ryu Do-ha
- Written by: Moon Soo-jung
- Directed by: Park Dan-hee
- Starring: Yim Si-wan; Seol In-ah; Kim Jung-hyun; Yeonwoo
- Country of origin: South Korea
- Original language: Korean
- No. of episodes: 10

Production
- Production companies: CJ ENM Studios; Pitapat Studio

Original release
- Network: tvN
- Release: October 19, 2026 – present

Love in Disguise (Korean: 나의 유죄인간) is an ongoing South Korean workplace romantic comedy television series starring Yim Si-wan, Seol In-ah, Kim Jung-hyun, and Yeonwoo. Based on the web novel Why You Don't Know It's a Girl? by Lee A-yeon and Ryu Do-ha, the series tells the story of a former special forces officer turned detective who disguises herself as a man and goes undercover as the personal secretary and bodyguard of a chaebol heir suspected of murder. It premiered on tvN on October 19, 2026, and airs every Monday and Tuesday at 20:50 (KST). It is also available for streaming on Amazon Prime Video.

== Synopsis ==
Yoon Yi-jun is the successor of the Taegang Group who isolates himself at home after becoming the prime suspect in his former secretary's mysterious murder. To solve the high-profile case, Kang Jae-hee, a skilled police detective and former special forces operative, goes undercover by cross-dressing as a man to infiltrate his inner circle. She is hired as Yi-jun's male secretary and personal bodyguard. As they work together, Yi-jun's erratic and demanding behavior conflicts with Jae-hee's covert investigation. While operating within the conglomerate, Jae-hee begins to develop genuine romantic feelings for Yi-jun, complicating her undercover mission.

== Cast and characters ==
=== Main ===
- Yim Si-wan as Yoon Yi-jun
  - Park Da-on as young Yi-jun

A third-generation chaebol who becomes a prime suspect in a murder case at his company and goes into hiding. His life changes when he hires a new assistant.

- Seol In-ah as Kang Jae-hee

A detective from a special forces unit who poses as a man and goes undercover as Yi-jun's personal secretary to investigate him.

- Kim Jung-hyun as Kim Si-hyun

A lawyer in the legal team of Taegang Group and Yi-jun's best friend.

- Yeonwoo as Lee Hye-jung

Secretary to the Chairman of Taegang Group.

=== Supporting ===
==== Taegang Group ====
- Jeong Han-seol as Jeong Da-woon

Yi-jun's secretary.

- Kim Do-yoon as Park Min-hwan

Taegang Group Accounting Team Manager.

- Jung Yoo-min as Han Eun-young

Yi-jun's secretary and Cabinet Murder Case Victim.

==== Criminal Investigation Unit ====
- Kim In-kwon as Park Bong-i

Criminal Investigation Mobile Unit Special Investigation Team Leader.

- Kim Ki-bang as Jeong Wan-gu

Sergeant of the Special Investigation Team, Mobile Criminal Investigation Unit.

- Nam Hae-jun as Kim Seok-jin

Inspector of the Special Investigation Team, Mobile Criminal Investigation Unit. He is Jae-hee's direct senior.

- Ahn Sang-woo as Ma Hee-do

Criminal Investigation Mobile Unit Superintendent.

==== Taegang family ====
- Choi Jin-ho as Yoon Tae-sik

Taegang Group Chairman and Yi-jun's father.

- Hong Eun-hee as Yoon Mi-jin

Taegang Retail CEO and Yi-jun's eldest sister.

- Park Ah-in as Yoon Na-jung
  - Han Seo-hee as young Na-jung

Taegang Group Executive Director and Yi-jun's second older sister.

- Jo Seung-yeon as Na Man-seok

Taegang Group Chief of Staff and Ji-hyun's younger brother.

- Lee Young-jun as Moon Jun-hyun

Media CEO and Na-jung's husband.

- Bas Yu-ri as Na Ji-hyun

Yi-jun's mother, who took her own life.

- Lee Seo-yeon as Kim Ka-on

Mi-jin's daughter and Yi-jun's niece

==== Jae-hee's family ====
- Ryu Seung-soo as Kang Seok-gu

Jae-hee's father.

- Park Jun-myeon as Jo Suk-ja

Jae-hee's mother.

==== Others ====
- Choi Hee-jin as Lee Si-a

Naon Art Center Director and Yi-jun's fiancée.

- Jeon Young as Choi Myeong-suk

Yi-jun's housekeeper.

- Choi Jung-hun as Sergeant Go

Jae-hee's senior in the special force unit, who died while on duty.

- Hyun Tae-l as Go Jin-young

Sergeant Go's son who Jae-hee takes care of him after Sergeant Go died.

==== Special Apperances ====
- Kim Min-kyu as Mr.Ko

Si-a's boyfriend

== Production ==
=== Development ===
Love in Disguise is based on the Kakao Page web novel and webtoon Why You Don't Know It's a Girl? by Lee A-yeon and Ryu Do-ha, produced by CJ ENM Studios and Pitapat Studio, directed by Park Dan-hee, and written by Moon Soo-jung. The series' Korean title was originally (여자인 걸 왜 모르지?; Yeojain geol wae moreuji?; 'Why Don't You Know It's a Woman?'), then changed to (그놈은 예뻤다; Geunomeun yeppeotda; 'He's Pretty'), before being finalized as (나의 유죄인간; Naui yujoeingan; 'My Guilty Human').

The script reading took place on December 17, 2025.

=== Casting ===
In October 2025, Yim Si-wan and Seol In-ah were in talks to star. The next month, Kim Jung-hyun was cast to star, while Yeonwoo and Kim In-kwon were reportedly considering. By December 2025, Yim and Seol were confirmed to lead the series.

=== Filming ===
Principal photography began in mid-December 2025, and concluded in June 2026.

== Release ==
Love in Disguise premiered on tvN on October 19, 2026, airing every Monday and Tuesday at 20:50 (KST). It is also available for streaming on Amazon Prime Video.

== Viewership ==
Love in Disguise : South Korea viewers per episode (thousands)

Season	Episode number												Average
Season	1	2	3	4	5	6	7	8	9	10	11	12	Average
1	1281	1143	1130	1305	1167	1259	1278	1225	1222	1256	TBD	TBD	TBD

Source: Audience measurement performed nationwide by Nielsen Korea.

Average TV viewership ratings
Ep.	Original broadcast date	Average audience share (Nielsen Korea)	
Ep.	Original broadcast date	Nationwide	Seoul
1	October 19, 2026	5.6% (1st)	5.6% (1st)
2	October 20, 2026	4.7% (1st)	4.7% (1st)
3	October 26, 2026	4.9% (1st)	4.7% (1st)
4	October 27, 2026	6.0% (1st)	5.7% (1st)
5	November 2, 2026	5.0% (1st)	5.0% (1st)
6	November 3, 2026	5.5% (1st)	5.6% (1st)
7	November 9, 2026	5.5% (1st)	5.9% (1st)
8	November 10, 2026	5.4% (1st)	5.3% (1st)
9	November 16, 2026	5.3% (1st)	4.8% (1st)
10	November 17, 2026	5.4% (1st)	5.2% (1st)
11	November 23, 2026		
12	November 24, 2026		
Average		—	—
In the table above, the blue numbers represent the lowest ratings and the red numbers represent the highest ratings.; This drama airs on a cable channel/pay TV which normally has a relatively smaller audience compared to free-to-air TV/public broadcasters (KBS, SBS, MBC, and EBS).
