= Coffee, Do Me a Favor =

2018 South Korean television series

- Promotional poster
- Hangul: 커피야, 부탁해
- Lit.: Coffee, Please
- RR: Keopiya, butakhae
- MR: K'ŏp'iya, put'akhae
- Genre: Romantic comedy Fantasy
- Written by: Seo Bo-ra; Lee A-yeon
- Directed by: Park Soo-chul
- Starring: Yong Jun-hyung; Kim Min-young; Chae Seo-jin
- Country of origin: South Korea
- Original language: Korean
- No. of episodes: 12

Production
- Executive producers: Choi Joong-rak; Jung Hee-wook; Kang Hyun-joo
- Producer: Song Byeong-soo
- Camera setup: Single-camera
- Production companies: BM Cultures; Contents Pool

Original release
- Network: Channel A
- Release: December 1 – December 30, 2018

Coffee, Do Me a Favor (Korean: 커피야, 부탁해; RR: Keopiya, Butakhae) is a 2018 South Korean television series starring Yong Jun-hyung, Kim Min-young and Chae Seo-jin. It premiered on December 1, 2018, and aired on Channel A's Saturdays and Sundays at 19:40 KST.

== Synopsis ==
It tells the story of an overweight woman who, after sipping on a cup of magic coffee, becomes a beauty; and a handsome man who doesn't believe in love.

== Cast ==
=== Main ===
- Yong Jun-hyung as Im Hyun-woo

A webtoon writer who doesn't believe in love.

- Chae Seo-jin as Oh Go-woon

A beautiful woman whom Seul-bi transforms into after drinking a cup of magic coffee.

- Kim Min-young as Lee Seul-bi

Hyun-woo's assistant / trainee who has a crush on him.

=== Supporting ===
- Jung Da-eun as Jang So-myung
- Lee Tae-ri as Moon Jung-won
- Gil Eun-hye as Kang Ye-na
- Ryu Hye-rin as Park A-reum
- Han Je-hoo as Jung Sook
- Maeng Se-chang as Lee Dong-goo
- Kim Neul-mae as Cafe Owner
