= Overman (film) =

- Theatrical poster
- Hangul: 초인
- RR: Choin
- MR: Ch'oin
- Directed by: Seo Eun-Young
- Written by: Seo Eun-Young
- Produced by: Park Young-Soi
- Starring: Kim Jung-hyun; Chae Seo-jin
- Cinematography: Jung Ki-Wook
- Release dates: October 2, 2015 (Busan); May 5, 2016
- Running time: 120 minutes
- Country: South Korea
- Language: Korean

Overman (Korean: 초인) is a 2015 South Korean film directed by Seo Eun-Young and starring Kim Jung-hyun and Chae Seo-jin. The film had its world premiere on October 2, 2015 at the Busan International Film Festival.

== Plot ==
High school gymnast Do-hyun (Kim Jung-hyun) is ordered to perform community service as a punishment for fighting. While serving as a library assistant, he meets Soo-hyun (Chae Seo-jin), a schoolgirl who borrows a lot of books. Finding her attractive, he talks to her and they gradually grow closer. This love between a teenage boy and girl looks cheerful enough, but they are both suffering in their own way. Each of them face new choices. It's a teenage love story and coming-of-age film in which the bright and wholesome protagonists bring joy throughout.

== Cast ==
- Kim Jung-hyun as Do-Hyun
- Chae Seo-jin as Soo-Hyun
- Seo Young-Hwa as Yeon-Hee
- Lee Chae-kyung as Psychiatrist
- Myung Gye-Nam as teacher
- Kim Min-Seok as Min-Sik

== Film Festival ==
The film world premiered at the 2015 (20th) Busan International Film Festival where it was screened from October 1–10 and it was awarded for "promoting independent cinema" according to The Hollywood Reporter.
