= Bae Noo-ri =

South Korean actress (born 1993)

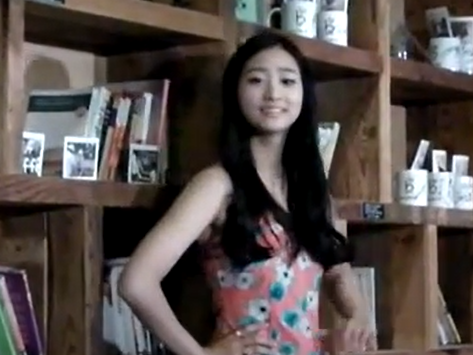
- Bae in 2012
- Born: February 4, 1993 (age 33); Anyang, Gyeonggi, South Korea
- Education: Dongduk Women's University – Broadcasting and Entertainment
- Occupation: Actress
- Years active: 2008–present
- Agent: Echo Global Group

Korean name
- Hangul: 배누리
- RR: Bae Nuri
- MR: Pae Nuri

Bae Noo-ri (Korean: 배누리; born February 4, 1993) is a South Korean actress. She began modeling in 2008 for the brand Litmus, then made her acting debut in 2010. Bae is best known for playing a shaman in a period television series Moon Embracing the Sun.

== Filmography ==
=== Television series ===
| Year | Title | Role |
|---|---|---|
| 2010 | Ang Shim Jung | Myung-wol |
| 2011 | Dream High | Han So-ri (ep. 6, 9, 12-13) |
| 2011 | Killer K | Nal Na-ri |
| 2011 | My Daughter the Flower | Daily tea lady |
| 2011 | Drama Special Series': "Sorry I'm Late" | Student Seung-hye |
| 2012 | Moon Embracing the Sun | Jan-shil |
| 2012 | To My Beloved | Hong Ran |
| 2013 | Puberty Medley | Jang Hyun-jin |
| 2013 | KBS Drama Special: "My Dad Is a Nude Model" | Shin-hye |
| 2014 | Inspiring Generation | Yang-yang |
| 2014 | You're All Surrounded | New cop |
| 2014 | Sweden Laundry | Bae Young-mi |
| 2016 | Woman with a Suitcase | Oh An-na |
| 2016-2021 | Dramaworld | Seo-yeon |
| 2017 | The Bride of Habaek | Shin Ja-ya |
| 2018 | Mysterious Personal Shopper | Kkot-nim / Lee Jae-young |
| 2018 | Your Honor | Bae Min-jung |
| 2019 | Doctor Detective | Park Hye-mi |
| 2020 | Cheat on Me If You Can | Eom Ji-eun |
| 2020 | In Your Dream | Yoo Nam Hee |
| 2022-23 | The Love in Your Eyes | Lee Young-Yi |

=== Films ===
| Year | Title | Role |
|---|---|---|
| 2010 | Mr. Zombie | So-ra |
| 2018 | Unstoppable | So-yeon |
| 2018 | Stay with Me | Mi-hee |
| 2023 | The Roundup: No Way Out | Mimi |

=== Music video appearances ===
| Year | Song title | Artist |
|---|---|---|
| 2010 | "Crackin' Love" | Catch the Goblin |

== Awards and nominations ==
Name of the award ceremony, year presented, category, nominee of the award, and the result of the nomination
| Award ceremony | Year | Category | Nominee / Work | Result | Ref. |
|---|---|---|---|---|---|
| KBS Drama Awards | 2022 | Excellence Award, Actress in a Daily Drama | The Love in Your Eyes | Nominated | |
