= Another Way (2015 film) =

2019 South Korean drama film

- Theatrical release poster
- Hangul: 다른 길이 있다
- RR: Dareun giri itda
- MR: Tarŭn kiri itta
- Directed by: Cho Chang-ho
- Written by: Cho Chang-ho
- Starring: Kim Jae-wook; Seo Yea-ji
- Cinematography: Lee Sung-jae
- Edited by: Bae Ye-eun
- Music by: Kim Kyung-jong
- Production company: Mohm Pictures
- Release dates: October 2015 (Busan); 19 January 2017 (South Korea)
- Running time: 89 minutes
- Country: South Korea
- Language: Korean

Another Way (Korean: 다른 길이 있다) is 2015 South Korean romantic drama film directed by Cho Chang-ho which premiered in 2015 at the 20th Busan International Film Festival, and was released to theatres in South Korea in January 2017.

== Plot ==
Soo-wan (Kim Jae-wook) and Jung-won (Seo Yea-ji) come from unstable families and have their own problems. After they meet on an online internet cafe, both of them decide to do a suicide pact.

== Cast ==
- Kim Jae-wook as Soo-wan
- Seo Yea-ji as Jung-won
- Kang Soo-jin as Hye-mi
- Jo Young-jin as Soo-wan's father
- Kang Ae-shim as Jung-won's mother
- Kim Se-dong as Jung-won's father
