= Be Positive =

- Official Poster
- Also known as: Positive Physique
- Genre: Web series Drama; Romantic comedy
- Written by: Lee Byung-heon
- Directed by: Lee Byung-heon
- Starring: Do Kyung-soo; Chae Seo-jin; Lee David
- Country of origin: South Korea
- Original language: Korean
- No. of episodes: 6

Production
- Producers: Choi Yoon-suk; Choo Hyun-sung
- Running time: 10 mins
- Production companies: Samsung; Cheil Worldwide

Original release
- Network: Naver TV Cast; JTBC2
- Release: October 31 – November 5, 2016

Be Positive (Korean: 긍정이 체질; RR: Geungjeongi chejil; lit. 'Positive Constitution') is a South Korean web series starring Doh Kyung-soo, Chae Seo-jin and Lee David. The web drama was produced by Samsung, and intends to send a message of support to the younger generation. The drama aired on October 31, 2016 at 17:00 (KST). The web drama started airing on JTBC2 on March 1, 2017.

== Plot ==
A story about Hwan-dong (Doh Kyung-soo), a film major who is preparing for his graduation project as a movie director. His script wins a grand prize, but he faces difficulty after difficulty while trying to finalize the film. He asks his ex-girlfriend Hye-jung (Chae Seo-jin) to play the main role in his production. She is understandably surprised at his bold request but in any case, she agrees. He completes his production with success.

== Cast ==
=== Main cast ===
- Doh Kyung-soo as Kim Hwan-dong

A film major who aspires to be a film director.

- Chae Seo-jin as Bang Hye-jung

Hwan-dong's ex-girlfriend who was quite a successful actress once.

- Lee David as Hwang In-guk

Hwan-dong's best friend who dreams to become a film producer.

=== Supporting cast ===
- Kim Jong-soo as Professor Ma
- Kim Eui-sung as Hwan-dong's father
- Nam Gi-ae as Hwan-dong's mother
- Heo Joon-suk as Noh Seung-boo
- Unknown as Kim Han-joo

== Original soundtracks ==
No.	Title	Artists	Length
1.	"The Common People"	Song Yoo-bin	3:23
2.	"Don't Let me Down"	Ryu Ji-hyun	4:07
Total length:			7:30

== Reception ==
It was reported that Be Positive became the second most watched web drama ever with 21.83 million views in just two weeks of its release, following Falling for Challenge (which was also produced by Samsung and starring D.O.'s bandmate, Xiumin), which has over 24 million views. On November 22, it was announced that the web drama surpassed 30 million views, making it the fastest web drama to reach this number of views within 18 days from its release, making it the most watched web drama of all time. As of December 30, 2016, the drama's views from Naver, Daum, Facebook and YouTube surpassed 50 million views. The web drama became the most watched in 2016 on Naver.

== Awards and nominations ==
Year	Award	Category	Recipient	Result
2017	12th Soompi Awards	Best Web Series	Be Positive	Won
