= Eve (South Korean TV series) =

2022 South Korean television series

- Promotional poster
- Also known as: Eve's Scandal
- Hangul: 이브
- RR: Ibeu
- MR: Ibŭ
- Genre: Melodrama; Revenge
- Written by: Yoon Young-mi
- Directed by: Park Bong-seop
- Starring: Seo Yea-ji; Park Byung-eun; Yoo Sun; Lee Sang-yeob
- Music by: Ha Geun-young
- Country of origin: South Korea
- Original language: Korean
- No. of episodes: 16

Production
- Executive producer: Kim Gun-hong
- Producers: Baek Chang-joo; Kwon Byung-wook; Kwon Jae-hyun; Choi Na-eun
- Editor: Bang Yoon-hee
- Running time: 60 minutes
- Production companies: Studio Dragon; C-JeS Entertainment

Original release
- Network: tvN
- Release: June 1 – July 21, 2022

Eve (Korean: 이브) is a South Korean television series starring Seo Yea-ji, Park Byung-eun, Yoo Sun, and Lee Sang-yeob. It aired on tvN from June 1 to July 21, 2022, every Wednesday and Thursday at 22:30 (KST) for 16 episodes.

== Plot ==
Teenager Lee La-el witnesses the destruction of her family and murder of her father in a hostile takeover orchestrated by Han Pan-ro, a powerful former prime minister. La-el is adopted by Jang Moon-hee, a woman whose daughter was also murdered by Pan-ro. Moon-hee encourages La-el's need for revenge, and the pair prepare to punish Pan-ro and his right-hand man Kim Jeong-chul.

Thirteen years later La-el, using the name Kim Sun-bin, has married Jang Ji-wook, who was also involved in Pan-ro's hostile takeover. Using this connection, La-el befriends Han So-ra, Pan-ro's daughter, and initiates an affair with Kang Yoon-gyeom, So-ra's husband. La-el is helped by Seo Eun-pyung, a congressman who was mentored by La-el's father, and who is in love with La-el.

The plan was for La-el to access Yoon-gyeom's business files and file a lawsuit against Pan-ro, but when she learns that So-ra killed her mother, she escalates. La-el reveals the affair to So-ra and Ji-wook to sabotage both marriages, and encourages Yoon-gyeom to pursue business dealings that betray Pan-ro and his own father.

Moon-hee realizes that La-el is falling in love with Yoon-gyeom. La-el and Moon-hee have a falling out, but agree to work on their revenge plans separately, with Moon-hee focused on filing the lawsuit.

Yoon-gyeom files for a divorce; So-ra rejects it, but Pan-ro wants So-ra to accept and countersues Yoon-gyeom. So-ra discovers Moon-hee's connection to Pan-ro, and tortures her for information in the hopes of winning Yoon-gyeom back.

When Moon-hee's lawsuit goes public, Pan-ro kills Moon-hee, and Yoon-gyeom realizes who La-el is and the extent of her manipulation. The police recover Moon-hee's body, and La-el finds a recorder in Moon-hee's clothes that has recorded Pan-ro, Jeong-chul and So-ra admitting their crimes. La-el shames Yoon-gyeom for his involvement with Pan-ro's crimes, though Yoon-gyeom protests that he didn't know the extent of them.

La-el takes over Moon-hee's lawsuit and reclaims her true identity. She and Eun-pyung work together to make Pan-ro, So-ra and Jeong-chul turn on each other. Pan-ro tries to kill So-ra, who imprisons him in his mansion's basement.

Yoon-gyeom holds a press conference admitting that violence was used in the hostile takeover, and endorses an investigation into the murders of Moon-hee and La-el's mother. Afterward, he disappears and leaves behind a will that assigns his company shares to La-el. Believing that Yoon-gyeom is going to commit suicide, La-el finds him and admits her true feelings for him.

Jeong-chul tries to kill La-el, but is killed by Yoon-gyeom. So-ra kidnaps La-el, and in response Yoon-gyeom drives with So-ra off a cliff; Yoon-gyeom dies, but So-ra survives, goes crazy and is placed in a mental hospital. Pan-ro, abandoned, dies in his house's basement.

La-el takes charge of Yoon-gyeom's company, turns it into a non-profit, and compensates all victims of the hostile takeover. She leaves for Buenos Aires, and some time later Eun-pyung travels there to find her, though La-el dreams of how her love with Yoon-gyeom might have gone if they met without pretense.

== Cast ==
=== Main ===
- Seo Yea-ji as Lee La-el/Kim Sun-bin
  - Kim Ji-an as young Lee La-el

A 28-year-old who is the daughter of a genius scientist. Thirteen years ago, her happy family life was shattered by her father's death. She therefore began to seek and plan revenge for 13 years, starting by targeting Kang Yoon-gyeom, one of the main culprits who orchestrated the death of her father. Unexpectedly, she slowly falls in love with Yoon-gyeom, and thus becomes torn between her desire for revenge, and her feelings for him.

- Park Byung-eun as Kang Yoon-gyeom

The 41-year-old heir of LY Group and So-ra's husband. He falls in love with La-el and has an affair with her, without realizing that this is part of La-el's revenge for her family's tragedy that he and his family had masterminded 13 years ago.

- Yoo Sun as Han So-ra

The 45-year-old wife of Yoon-Hyeon and daughter of South Korea's highest-ranking politician. She is dangerously obsessive about her husband. She is also responsible for the death of La-el's mother.

- Lee Sang-yeob as Seo Eun-pyung

A 38-year-old former human rights lawyer who became the youngest member of the National Assembly. He helped La-el leave South Korea after her family's tragedy 13 years ago. He is a righteous person willing to give up anything for love.

=== Supporting ===
==== People around Lee La-el ====
- Lee Il-hwa as Jang Moon-hee

A woman who pretends to be La-el's mother, and an accomplice in her revenge plot.

- Lee Ha-yool as Jang Jin-wook

La-el's husband who loves his wife dearly. He has a close working relationship with Yoon-gyeom.

- Kim Si-woo as Jang Bo-ram

Jin-wook's daughter and La-el's stepdaughter. She is doted and cared for by La-el.

- Jo Deok-hyun as Lee Tae-joon

La-el's father and a genius scientist who was killed 13 years ago due to a sinister plot by the corrupt higher-ups of South Korea.

- Kim Jung-young as Kim Jin-sook

La-el's mother, who was loving and caring towards her daughter. She went missing after her husband died. She is later revealed to have been killed by So-ra. But she was also has mental illness and does not believe in taking medication

==== People around Kang Yoon-gyeom ====
- Park Myung-hoon as Kang Si-gyeom

Yoon-gyeom's elder brother.

- Lee Se-na as Yoon Soo-jung
- Noh Ha-yeon as Kang Da-bi

Yoon-gyeom's second child and daughter. She is a timid but good-natured girl.

==== People around Han So-ra ====
- Jeon Kook-hwan as Han Pan-ro

So-ra's father and the highest ranking politician of South Korea. He is ruthless and corrupt, and was one of the plotters behind La-el's father's death.

- Jung Hae-kyun as Kim Jeong-chul

Pan-ro's faithful henchman who killed La-el's father and forced him to transfer his company to LY Group.

- Cha Ji-hyuk as Moon Do-wan
- Son So-mang as Eun Dam-ri
- Kim Ye-eun as Yeo Ji-hee
- Lee Ji-ha as Chae Ri-sa

==== People around Seo Eun-pyung ====
- So Hee-jung as Kim Gye-young

== Production and release ==
On November 21, 2021, it was announced that filming had begun, with premiere period scheduled for the first half of 2022. On February 25, 2022, a photo showing the main cast holding the script was released.

Eve was originally scheduled to premiere on May 25, 2022, but it was delayed by a week due to quality enhancement of the series.

== Original soundtrack ==
=== Part 1 ===
Released on June 8, 2022
No.	Title	Lyrics	Music	Artist	Length
1.	"Hold Me Tight"	Ha Geun-young; Lee Su-yeon; Truth	Ha Geun-Young; Very Berry; Truth	Kim Ye-ji	4:03
2.	"Hold Me Tight" (Inst.)		Ha Geun-Young; Very Berry; Truth		4:03
Total length:					8:06

=== Part 2 ===
Released on June 23, 2022
No.	Title	Lyrics	Music	Artist	Length
1.	"Adios Amante"	Snnny	Snnny	Shin You-me	4:03
2.	"Adios Amante" (Inst.)		Snnny		4:03
Total length:					8:06

=== Part 3 ===
Released on July 7, 2022
No.	Title	Lyrics	Music	Artist	Length
1.	"Want To Be Your Everyday" (매일이고 싶어)	Kyung Soo-han; Lee Do-hyeong (AUG)	Kyung Soo-han; Lee Do-hyeong (AUG); Jung Soo-wan	Sondia	3:42
2.	"Want To Be Your Everyday" (매일이고 싶어; Inst.)		Kyung Soo-han; Lee Do-hyeong (AUG); Jung Soo-wan		3:42
Total length:					7:24

=== Part 4 ===
Released on July 14, 2022
No.	Title	Lyrics	Music	Artist	Length
1.	"Only You" (오직, 그대)	Chicok; Ruach	Chicok; Ruach	Lee Hyun	4:10
2.	"Only You" (오직, 그대 Inst.)		Chicok; Ruach		4:10
Total length:					8:20

== Viewership ==
Eve : South Korea viewers per episode (thousands)

Season	Episode number																Average
Season	1	2	3	4	5	6	7	8	9	10	11	12	13	14	15	16	Average
1	763	776	650	677	727	824	798	909	816	780	745	728	732	859	786	931	781

Source: Audience measurement performed nationwide by Nielsen Korea.

Average TV viewership ratings
Ep.	Original broadcast date	Average audience share (Nielsen Korea)	
Ep.	Original broadcast date	Nationwide	Seoul
1	June 1, 2022	3.644% (1st)	3.256% (2nd)
2	June 2, 2022	3.700% (1st)	3.419% (1st)
3	June 8, 2022	3.009% (2nd)	2.872% (2nd)
4	June 9, 2022	2.967% (2nd)	2.495% (2nd)
5	June 15, 2022	3.537% (2nd)	3.971% (2nd)
6	June 16, 2022	3.919% (2nd)	3.822% (2nd)
7	June 22, 2022	3.571% (2nd)	3.599% (2nd)
8	June 23, 2022	4.141% (2nd)	4.230% (2nd)
9	June 29, 2022	4.093% (2nd)	3.985% (2nd)
10	June 30, 2022	3.852% (2nd)	3.618% (2nd)
11	July 6, 2022	3.630% (3rd)	3.469% (3rd)
12	July 7, 2022	3.690% (3rd)	3.363% (3rd)
13	July 13, 2022	3.354% (3rd)	3.342% (3rd)
14	July 14, 2022	3.782% (3rd)	3.461% (3rd)
15	July 20, 2022	3.685% (2nd)	3.681% (3rd)
16	July 21, 2022	4.497% (2nd)	4.639% (2nd)
Average		3.692%	3.576%
In the table above, the blue numbers represent the lowest ratings and the red numbers represent the highest ratings.; This drama airs on a cable channel/pay TV which normally has a relatively smaller audience compared to free-to-air TV/public broadcasters (KBS, SBS, MBC, and EBS).

== Awards and nominations ==
Name of the award ceremony, year presented, category, nominee of the award, and the result of the nomination
Award ceremony	Year	Category	Nominee	Result	Ref.
APAN Star Awards	2022	Excellence Award, Actress in a Miniseries	Yoo Sun	Won	
