= Kokdu: Season of Deity =

2023 South Korean television series

- Promotional poster
- Hangul: 꼭두의 계절
- Hanja: 꼭두의 季節
- Lit.: Season of Kkokdu (Note: Kkokdu is Korea's traditional wooden puppet, usually used to decorate a funeral bier.)
- RR: Kkokduui gyejeol
- MR: Kkoktuŭi kyejŏl
- Genre: Fantasy; Romance
- Developed by: Kim Ho-jun (planning)
- Written by: Kang Yi-heon; Heo Jun-woo
- Directed by: Baek Soo-chan; Kim Ji-hoon
- Starring: Kim Jung-hyun; Im Soo-hyang; Kim Da-som; Ahn Woo-yeon; Kim In-kwon; Cha Chung-hwa
- Music by: Park Se-joon
- Country of origin: South Korea
- Original language: Korean
- No. of episodes: 16

Production
- Producers: Jeong Chan-hee; Bae Seon-hae; Yoo Cheol-yong; Jung Gu-young
- Running time: 70 minutes
- Production companies: People Story Company; Story TV

Original release
- Network: MBC TV
- Release: January 27 – March 24, 2023

Kokdu: Season of Deity (Korean: 꼭두의 계절) (Note: The Korean title is a play on the names of lead characters Kokdu and Han Gye-jeol, which can also be literally translated to Kokdu's Gye-jeol.) is a 2023 South Korean television series starring Kim Jung-hyun, Im Soo-hyang, Kim Da-som, Ahn Woo-yeon, Kim In-kwon, and Cha Chung-hwa. It aired on MBC TV from January 27 to March 24, 2023, every Friday and Saturday at 21:50 (KST). It is also available for streaming on Wavve in South Korea, and on IQIYI, Viki and Viu in selected regions.

== Synopsis ==
The series is about a grim reaper named Kokdu (Kim Jung-hyun) who visits the mortal world every 99 years to punish humans. He meets Dr. Han Gye-jeol (Im Soo-hyang), a doctor with mysterious abilities, and starts working as a visiting doctor.

== Cast ==
=== Main ===
- Kim Jung-hyun as Kokdu / Do Jin-woo / Oh-hyeon
1. Kokdu: an underworld god who has been cursed to lead the deceased in the afterlife after angering the Creator, and has to enter a human body that looks just like him to carry out the murders of immoral people.
2. Do Jin-woo: a successful surgeon and Gye-jeol's fellow hospital worker, who is possessed by Kokdu.
3. Oh-hyeon: Seol-hee's lover who was cursed by the Creator to become Kokdu.
- Im Soo-hyang as Han Gye-jeol / Seol-hee
1. Han Gye-jeol: an ER doctor who graduated from the lowest-ranking medical school in the country.
2. Seol-hee: Gye-jeol in a past life, who is a princess that was loved by Oh-hyeon for a long time.
- Kim Da-som as Tae Jeong-won

A talented woman who never missed the first rank from the time she entered Korea University of Medicine until graduation.

- Ahn Woo-yeon as Han Cheol

Gye-jeol's younger brother who is a detective.

- Kim In-kwon as Oksin / Lee Eung-chul

A demigod whose purpose of existence is to assist Kokdu. In the human world he poses as a chaebol.

- Cha Chung-hwa as Gaksin / Seo Bok-gyeong

The god of rumor with the highest level of nunchi. In the human world, she poses as a YouTube influencer, and later, a nurse.

=== Supporting ===
==== Pilseong Bio ====
- Choi Kwang-il as Kim Pil-soo

Chairman of Pilseong Hospital.

- Kim Young-woong as Jung-sik

Pil-soo's shadow who is a murderer with fourteen convictions.

==== People in Yeongpo City ====
- Lee Jung-joon as Jung Yi-deun

Gye-jeol's ex-boyfriend.

- Kim Byeong-ok as Shin Hong-geun

Owner of Yongwang-nim Samgyeopsal.

- Oh Young-sil as Oh Kyung-seung

Hong-geun's wife.

- Lee Young-ran as Moon Myung-ja

CEO of Yeongpo Jongga Co.

- Woo Hyun as Choi Dal-seung

Myung-ja's husband who is the president of Yeongpo Small Business Association.

- Kim Byeong-chun as Bae Jeong-guk

Manager of Fire Fist Gym.

- Min Jun-ho as Detective Kim

A homicide detective.

==== Pilseong Hospital ====
- Son So-mang as Sa Guk-hwa

Jeong-won's friend who is a nurse at Pilseong Hospital.

=== Extended ===
- Jung Ah-mi as Jang Mi-soon

Jin-woo's biological mother who is a professor of Hepatobiliary and Pancreatic Surgery at Pilseong Hospital.

- Oh Yeon-ah as Ji Soo-yeon

A doctor at Pilseong Hospital.

- Park Shin-woo as Jo Bong-pil

A pharmacist who does not hesitate to commit illegal and evil acts.

- Jung Wook as Park Chung-seong

=== Special appearances ===
- Jung Young-joo as a deceased patient's daughter
- Sung Byeong-sook as a patient
- Kim Kang-hoon as the Creator
- Yoo Jae-suk as an employee
- Jeong Jun-ha as an employee
- Lee Mi-joo as an employee
- Wang Bit-na as Gye-jeol's mother

== Production ==
Filming of the series had started by September 2022.

Hangout with Yoo cast members Yoo Jae-suk, Jeong Jun-ha and Lee Mi-joo made cameo appearances on Kokdu: Season of Deity as part of the variety show's "HWY HR" segment. The filming of their scene with lead actress Im Soo-hyang was conducted in Ganghwa County, and was broadcast on the show on October 22, 2022.

On October 31, 2022, the production team announced that filming for the series was halted due to the death of actor Lee Ji-han who died on October 29 during the Seoul Halloween crowd crush tragedy, and would resume at a later date after reorganization. It was reported that Lee took the role of Jung Yi-deun, the ex-boyfriend of Im Soo-hyang's character. On November 7, an official from MBC confirmed that filming would resume on that day, and the production team decided to find a replacement for the late actor after much deliberation. It was later announced that Lee Jung-joon would join the cast, taking over Lee Ji-han's role.

== Release ==
The series was initially scheduled to premiere at the end of 2022, but was pushed back to January 2023.

== Viewership ==
Kokdu: Season of Deity : South Korea viewers per episode (thousands)

Season	Episode number															
Season	1	2	3	4	5	6	7	8	9	10	11	12	13	14	15	16
1	858	N/A	560	N/A	N/A	N/A	523	N/A	N/A	N/A	N/A	N/A	N/A	N/A	N/A	N/A

Source: Audience measurement performed nationwide by Nielsen Korea.

Average TV viewership ratings
Ep.	Original broadcast date	Average audience share (Nielsen Korea)	
Ep.	Original broadcast date	Nationwide	Seoul
1	January 27, 2023	4.8% (14th)	4.8% (14th)
2	January 28, 2023	2.2% (33rd)	N/A
3	February 3, 2023	3.1% (20th)	3.2% (19th)
4	February 4, 2023	2.4% (34th)	N/A
5	February 10, 2023	2.8% (24th)	N/A
6	February 11, 2023	1.9% (36th)	N/A
7	February 17, 2023	2.7% (23rd)	N/A
8	February 18, 2023	1.4% (47th)	N/A
9	February 24, 2023	2.0% (29th)	N/A
10	February 25, 2023	1.7% (43rd)	N/A
11	March 3, 2023	1.6% (36th)	N/A
12	March 4, 2023	2.0% (31st)	N/A
13	March 11, 2023	1.4% (43rd)	N/A
14	March 17, 2023	1.4% (37th)	N/A
15	March 18, 2023	1.3% (43rd)	N/A
16	March 24, 2023	1.6% (37th)	N/A
Average		2.1%	— (Note: Due to some unpublished ratings, the exact average rating is unknown.)
In the table above, the blue numbers represent the lowest ratings and the red numbers represent the highest ratings; N/A denotes ratings that were not published.

== Awards and nominations ==
Name of the award ceremony, year presented, category, nominee(s) of the award, and the result of the nomination
Award ceremony	Year	Category	Nominee / Work	Result	Ref.
MBC Drama Awards	2023	Best Supporting Actor	Cha Chung-hwa	Won	
MBC Drama Awards	2023	Top Excellence Award, Actress in a Miniseries	Im Soo-hyang	Nominated	
