= Stay with Me (2018 film) =

2018 South Korean romance film

- Theatrical release poster
- Hangul: 기억을 만나다
- RR: Gieogeul mannada
- MR: Kiŏgŭl mannada
- Directed by: Bryan Ku
- Produced by: Kwak Kyung-taek
- Starring: Seo Yea-ji; Kim Jung-hyun; Dong Hyun-bae; Bae Noo-ri
- Production companies: Barunson E&A; EVR Studio
- Release date: 31 March 2018 (South Korea)
- Running time: 37.49 minutes
- Country: South Korea
- Language: Korean

Stay with Me (Korean: 기억을 만나다; also known as Meet the Memories - First Love) is the world's 1st 4DX VR film that screened in a 4DX theater.

== Plot ==
Bittersweet first love story of a stage frightened prospective musician Woo-jin (Kim Jung-hyun) and vivacious would be actress Yeon-soo (Seo Yea-ji).

== Cast ==
- Seo Yea-ji as Yeon-Soo
- Kim Jung-hyun as Woo-jin
- Dong Hyun-bae as jae-hyun
- Bae Noo-ri as Mi-hee
