= Will You Be There? =

2016 film by Hong Ji-young

- Theatrical release poster
- Hangul: 당신, 거기 있어줄래요
- Hanja: 當身, 거기 있어줄래요
- RR: Dangsin, geogi isseo jullaeyo
- MR: Tangsin, kŏgi issŏ chullaeyo
- Directed by: Hong Ji-young
- Screenplay by: Hong Ji-young
- Based on: Seras-tu là ? by Guillaume Musso
- Produced by: Park Sun-hye; Min Kyu-dong; Min Jin-soo
- Starring: Kim Yoon-seok; Byun Yo-han; Chae Seo-jin
- Cinematography: Lee Seung-min; Park Hong-yeol
- Edited by: Kim Chang-ju; Park Kyoung-suk
- Music by: Kim Jun-seong
- Production company: Soo Film
- Distributed by: Lotte Entertainment
- Release date: December 14, 2016
- Running time: 111 minutes
- Country: South Korea
- Language: Korean
- Box office: US$8.3 million

Will You Be There? (Korean: 당신, 거기 있어줄래요) is a 2016 South Korean fantasy drama film directed by Hong Ji-young, based on the French novel, Seras-tu là?, by Guillaume Musso. The film stars Kim Yoon-seok, Byun Yo-han and Chae Seo-jin.

== Synopsis ==
=== Present Day (2015) ===
Soo-hyun, while volunteering on a medical mission, saves a young girl's life. In gratitude, the girl's grandfather gives him ten mysterious pills. Out of curiosity, Soo-hyun takes one and instantly falls asleep. When he wakes up, he finds himself face-to-face with his own past self from 30 years ago.

=== Past (1985) ===
The younger Soo-hyun, living happily with his longtime love Yeon-ah, comes across a man collapsed on the street and helps him. The man claims to be Soo-hyun from 30 years in the future. Though skeptical at first, the younger Soo-hyun begins to feel shaken as the man presents undeniable proof.

When the present-day Soo-hyun confesses that he desperately wants to see his lost love Yeon-ah just once more, the younger Soo-hyun is overcome with a strange sense of unease and soon learns of an unbelievable future awaiting him.

== Cast ==
- Kim Yoon-seok as Soo-hyun
- Byun Yo-han as Soo-hyun (young)
- Chae Seo-jin as Yeon-ah (young)
- Kim Sang-ho as Tae-ho
- Ahn Se-ha as Tae-ho (young)
- Park Hye-su as Soo-ah
- Kim Ho-jung as Hye-won
- Yoon Jin-yeong as dolphin show business head
- Lee Yoo-mi as animal society employee
- Lee Ho-cheol as cigarette store clerk
- Kim Ji-young as veterinarian
- Jang Gwang as Soo-hyun's father
- Kim Sun-a as Sun-yeong
- Kim Kwang-kyu as postman
- Park Kil-soo as barbershop owner
- Park Hee-von as Hye-won (young)
- Kim Sung-ryung as Yeon-ah
- Jung In-gi as Yoon
- Kim Hyo-jin as Irina
- Shim Eun-jin as woman at conference

== Awards and nominations ==
| Year | Award | Category | Recipient | Result | Ref. |
|---|---|---|---|---|---|
| 2017 | 37th Golden Cinema Film Festival | Popularity Award | Byun Yo-han | Won | |
| 2017 | 54th Grand Bell Awards | Best New Actor | Byun Yo-han | Nominated | |
