= Afterwards (2008 film) =

- French promotional poster
- Directed by: Gilles Bourdos
- Screenplay by: Gilles Bourdos; Michel Spinosa
- Based on: Et après... by Guillaume Musso
- Produced by: Olivier Delbosc; Christian Gagné; Christian Larouche; Marc Missonnier
- Starring: Romain Duris; John Malkovich; Evangeline Lilly
- Cinematography: Mark Lee Ping Bin
- Edited by: Valérie Deseine
- Music by: Alexandre Desplat
- Distributed by: Seville Pictures (Canada); Mars Distribution (France)
- Release dates: September 7, 2008 (TIFF); January 14, 2009 (France)
- Running time: 107 minutes
- Countries: Canada; France
- Language: English
- Budget: C$10 million
- Box office: $3.3 million

Afterwards (French: Et après) is a 2008 English-language psychological thriller film directed by Gilles Bourdos and starring Romain Duris, John Malkovich and Evangeline Lilly. Based on Guillaume Musso's novel Et après..., the story is about a workaholic lawyer who is told by a self-proclaimed visionary that he must try to prevent his imminent death. The film was shot in New York City, Montreal and various New Mexico locations over June and July 2007, and had a French release in January 2009.

== Synopsis ==
In the fall of 1972, on a wooden pontoon on the edge of a lake on the island of Nantucket, two children, Claire and Nathan (8 years old, of French origin) observe a swan. The pontoon breaks and Claire falls into the water. Nathan runs to get his parents out of breath, but he is hit by a car near his house. He then sees himself out of his body and has the impression of flying towards a living light where he feels good (see: near-death experience). But he does not die; he comes out of a coma and a doctor questions him about what he saw. Many years later, Nathan (Romain Duris), an adult, is a lawyer in New York and must deal with an air disaster file. He married Claire (Evangeline Lilly) with whom he had two children, a girl: Tracy (Sara Waisglass) and a boy: Paul, but the little boy died in his sleep and since the sudden death of the infant, Nathan has taken refuge in his work. His wife then left him and went to live elsewhere with their daughter.

One day, Nathan meets Dr. Joseph Kay (John Malkovich), a mysterious doctor who became known as the "Messager". Kay claims to know that some people will die when he sees a white halo springing out of them, and thinks he is in charge of helping these people put their lives in order before leaving for the afterlife. If Nathan does not believe a word of all this, he nevertheless witnesses more than disconcerting scenes, seeming to confirm the doctor's words. Nathan is afraid that something might also happen to him and becomes almost paranoid.

== Cast ==
- Romain Duris as Nathan Del Amico, a workaholic New York lawyer whose success has led him to neglect his wife and daughter
- John Malkovich as Joseph Kay, a doctor who claims to be able to predict people's deaths
- Evangeline Lilly as Claire, Nathan's recently divorced wife and childhood sweetheart
- Reece Thompson as Jeremy
- Sara Waisglass as Tracey, the daughter
- Sophi Knight as 7 year old Claire
- Morgan Costa Rouchy as 7 year old Nathan Del Amico

== Production ==
Gilles Bourdos and Michel Spinosa wrote Afterwards as a film adaptation of Guillaume Musso's French novel Et après.... The film, a C$10 million co-production between Canada's Christal Films Productions and France's Fidélité Films, was filmed over six weeks in New York, Quebec and New Mexico. Filming in Manhattan commenced on June 4, 2007. Production moved to New Mexico from June 15–19, where scenes were shot at various locations in Albuquerque, Alamogordo, Jemez Springs and Tularosa. Filming resumed in Montreal on July 7 and lasted for approximately 25 days; the city was chosen as a filming location for its tax deduction incentives and the ease in making "Montreal look like anywhere in the world". Though writer/director Bourdos is French, as is Musso's adapted novel and co-financier Christal Films Productions, Afterwards was shot almost entirely in English.

== Release ==
The film had its world premiere on September 7, 2008 at the 2008 Toronto International Film Festival, looking for a U.S. distribution buyer. It was theatrically released by Mars Distribution on January 14, 2009 in France and Belgium, earning US$159,500 from 250 screens on its opening weekend in France. It went on to gross $1.1 million in its first week and ranked fifth in the Paris area.

Seville Pictures bought the rights to the film's Canadian distribution from Christal Films, which also produced the film and provided 30% of finances.
