= Kim Min-young =

South Korean actress (born 1990)

- Born: Kim Min-young; January 26, 1990 (age 36); Seoul, South Korea
- Other name: Kim Min-yeong
- Education: Sangmyung University
- Occupation: Actress
- Years active: 2009–present
- Agent: Starit Entertainment

Korean name
- Hangul: 김민영
- RR: Gim Minyeong
- MR: Kim Minyŏng

Kim Min-young (Korean: 김민영; born January 26, 1990) is a South Korean actress. She is best known for her supporting roles in Hi! School: Love On, Guardian: The Lonely and Great God and Plus Nine Boys. Kim appeared in the teen drama Who Are You: School 2015 as Jin Kwon. Kim also played lead roles in films such as Sunny and Makgeolli Girls and in the drama Coffee, Do Me a Favor.

== Filmography ==
=== Film ===
Year	Title	Role	Ref.
2009	Lifting King Kong	Lee Bo-yeong	
2010	Death Bell 2: Bloody Camp	Min-jung	
2011	Sunny	Kim Jang-mi	
2015	Makgeolli Girls	Jang-mi	
2024	Walker	Byeong-tae's older sister	

=== Television series ===
Year	Title	Role	Ref.
2009	You're Beautiful	AN Jell fan	
2011	High Kick: Revenge of the Short Legged	Ji-won's high school friend	
2012	Flower Band	Eun-in	
2013	Monstar	Shim Eun-ha	
2013	KBS Drama Special: "Yeonu's Summer"	High school student	
2013	Looking Forward to Romance	Eun-jung	
2013	Reply 1994	Blind date	
2013	One Well-Raised Daughter	Ha-myung	
2014	Glorious Day	Mi-na	
2014	Endless Love	Hwa-ja	
2014	Hi! School: Love On	Na Yeong-eun	
2014	Plus Nine Boys	Jung Yeon	
2014	Pinocchio	Song Yeong-joo	
2015	Unkind Ladies	Ahn Jong-mi	
2015	Who Are You: School 2015	Lee Soo-mi	
2016	Uncontrollably Fond	Go Na-ri	
2016–2017	Guardian: The Lonely and Great God	So-jin	
2017	Queen of the Ring	Pi On-hwa	
2017	Man to Man	Woon Gwang's fan	
2017	Temperature of Love	Kim Ki-da	
2018	Coffee, Do Me a Favor	Lee Seul-bi	
2021	Drama Stage: "Deok Gu is Back"	Cheon Do-hee	
2023	Pandora: Beneath the Paradise	Park Soo-jeong	
