= Guillaume Musso =

French novelist

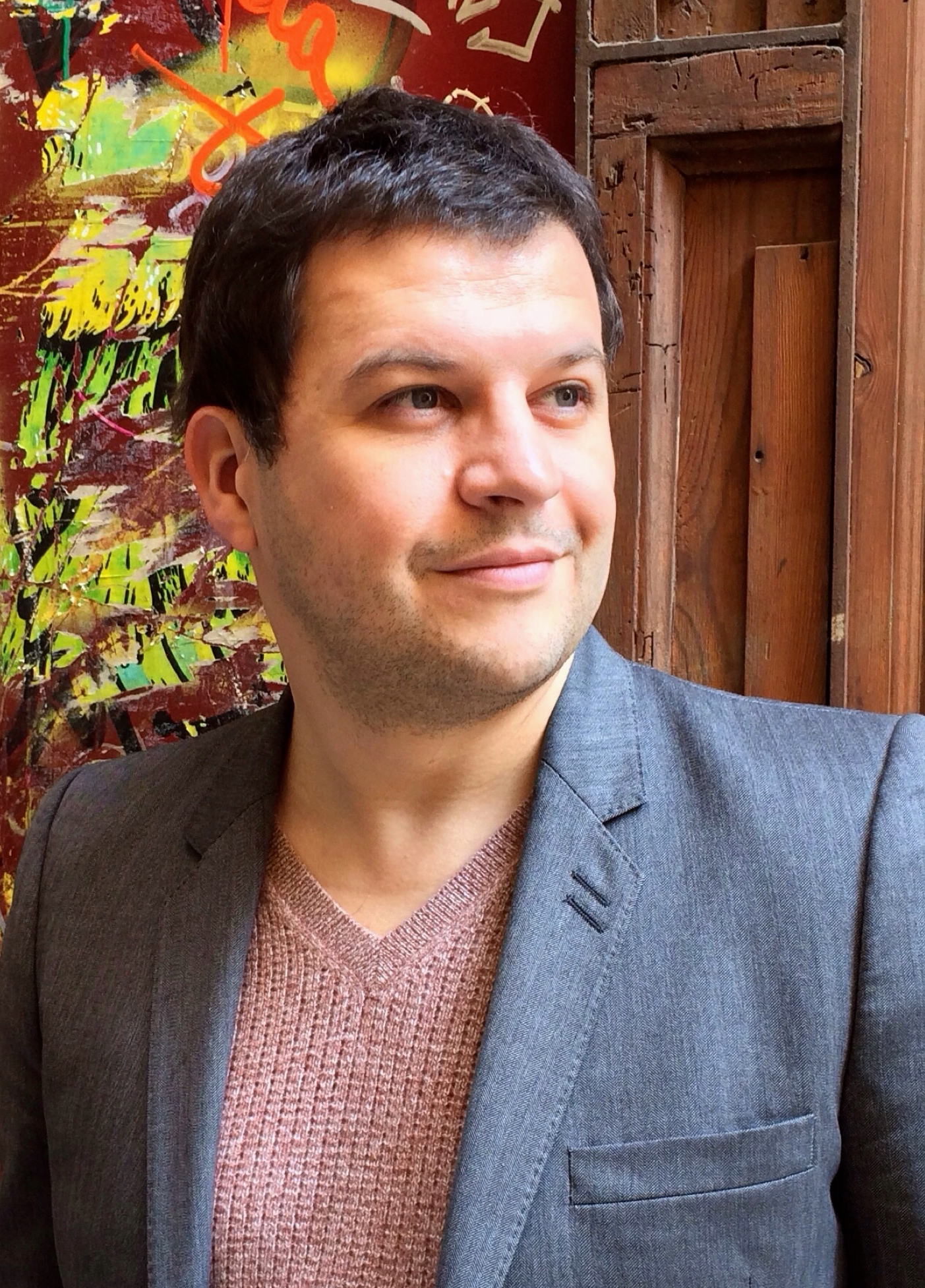
Guillaume Musso (2014)

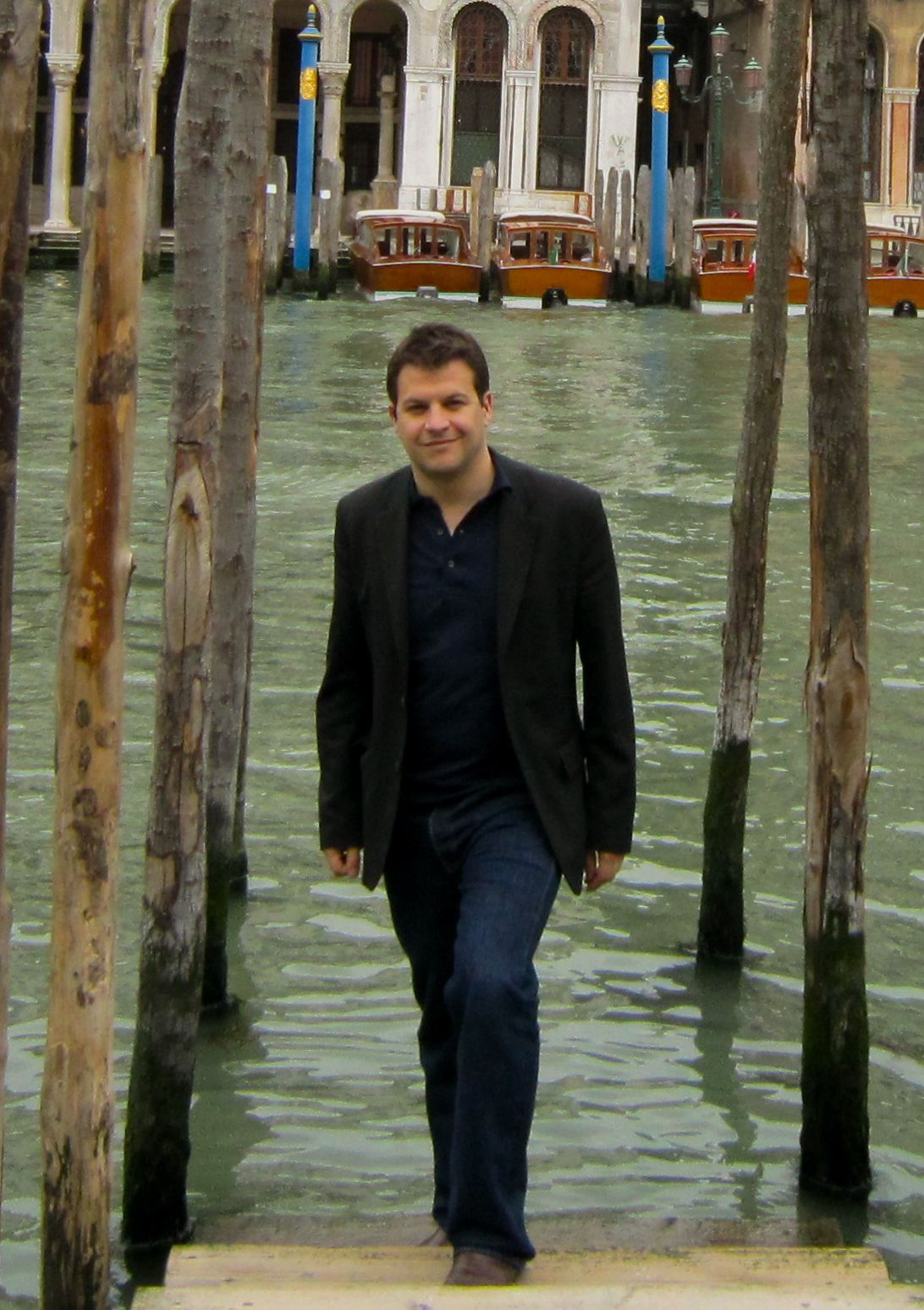
Guillaume Musso in Venice

Guillaume Musso (French pronunciation: [ɡijom myso]; born 6 June 1974) is a French novelist. He is one of the most popular contemporary French authors.

== Career ==
Musso was born in 1974 in Antibes (Alpes-Maritimes), France. After finishing high school, he left for the United States at the age of 19. He spent several months in New York City, living with other young foreigners and earning money by selling ice-cream. Then he came back to France, earned a degree in economics, and taught in high schools. His first published novel, Skidamarink, a thriller that opens with the theft of the Mona Lisa from the Musée du Louvre, was published in 2001.

After a car accident he became interested in near-death experiences and imagined a story about a man who returns to life after touching death. This became the novel Afterwards... published in 2004 by XO Editions, which sold more than 1 million copies in France and has been translated into 23 languages. Afterwards, the film directed by Gilles Bourdos starring John Malkovich and Evangeline Lilly, was released in France in January 2009 and then internationally.

Musso wrote A mix up in Heaven in 2005, Will you be there in 2006, Lost and Found in 2007, One Day, Perhaps in 2008, Where Would I Be Without You? in 2009,Girl on Paper in 2010 and Call from an Angel in 2011. In 2009, Musso was the #2 bestselling author in France, and according to a 2011 Edistat study he holds third place on the list of authors who have sold the most books in France since 2008, just after Stephenie Meyer and before Harlan Coben. Some 11 million copies of his novels have been sold worldwide and they have been translated into 46 languages.

== Novels ==
- Skidamarink, Éditions Anne Carrière, 2001 and Calmann-Lévy, 2020
- Afterwards... (original title: Et après) XO Editions, 2004
- A Mix-Up in Heaven (original title: Sauve-moi) XO Editions, 2005
- Will You Be There? (original title: Seras-tu là?) XO Editions, 2006
- Lost and Found (original title: Parce que je t'aime) XO Editions, 2007
- One Day, Perhaps (original title: Je reviens te chercher) XO Editions, 2008
- Where Would I Be Without You? (original title: Que serais-je sans toi ?) XO Editions, 2009
- Girl on Paper (original title: La Fille de papier) XO Editions, 2010
- Call from an Angel (original title: L'Appel de l'ange) XO Editions, 2011
- Seven years later (original title: 7 ans après) XO Editions, 2013
- Tomorrow (original title: Demain) XO Editions, 2013
- Central Park XO Editions, 2014
- This very instant (original title: L'instant présent) XO Edition, 2015
- Brooklyn Girl (original title: La Fille de Brooklyn) XO Edition, 2016
- Un appartement à Paris, XO Edition, 2017
- La Jeune Fille et la Nuit, Calmann-Levy, 2018 (English title: The Reunion)
- La vie secrète des écrivains, Calmann-Lévy, 2019
- La vie est un roman, Calmann-Lévy, 2020
- L'Inconnue de la Seine, Calmann-Lévy, 2021
- Angélique, Calmann-Lévy, 2022
- Quelqu'un d'autre, Calmann-Lévy, 2024
- Le Crime du paradis, Calmann-Lévy, 2026

== Awards ==
- Italy, Award for the love novel Scrivere per Amore, Verone, 2005
- France, Best adaptable novel for the cinema Prix du meilleur roman adaptable au cinéma, 2004
