= Chae Seo-jin =

South Korean actress

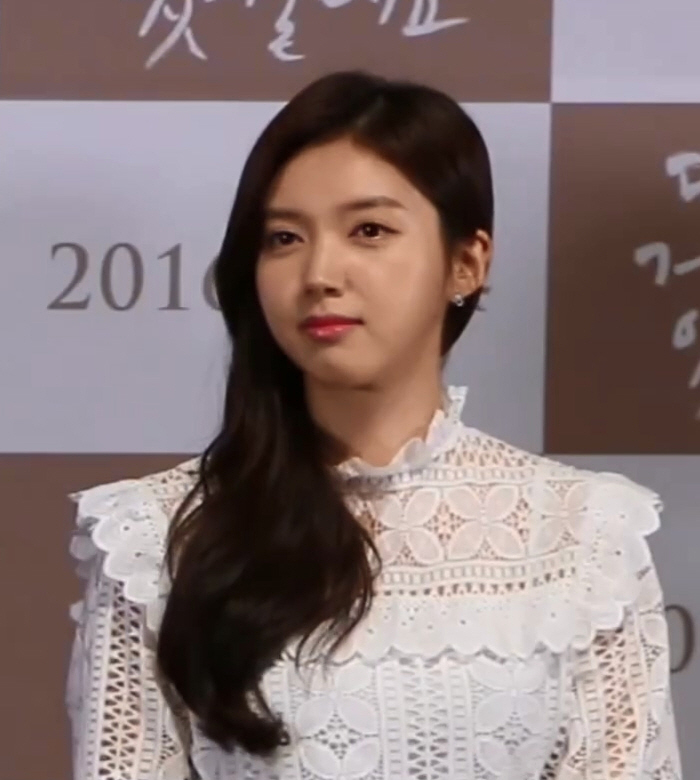
- Born: Kim Ko-woon; 30 April 1994 (age 32); Gwangyang-eup, Gwangyang, South Korea
- Education: School of Performing Arts Seoul; Korea National University of Arts
- Occupation: Actress
- Years active: 2006–present
- Agent: Huayi Brothers
- Height: 169 cm (5 ft 7 in)
- Spouse: Unknown (m. 2024)
- Relatives: Kim Ok-vin (sister)

Korean name
- Hangul: 김고운
- RR: Gim Goun
- MR: Kim Koun

Stage name
- Hangul: 채서진
- RR: Chae Seojin
- MR: Ch'ae Sŏjin

Kim Ko-woon (Korean: 김고운; born 30 April 1994), known professionally as Chae Seo-jin (채서진), is a South Korean actress. She started her career as a young actress in Over the Rainbow (2006). She is known to be Kim Ok-vin's sister. In May 2016, Chae decided to use Chae Seo-jin as her stage name instead of her birth name, Kim Ko-woon.

== Career ==
Chae started her acting career in 2006 where she played young Jung Hee-soo in Over the Rainbow.

In 2011, Chae made her musical debut in Catch a Timid Man.

In 2014, Chae made her big screen debut in the movie My Brilliant Life.

In 2015, Chae was cast as the female lead role in the movie Overman, which was played at the 20th Busan International Film Festival.

Chae was cast in several films in 2016; namely Write or Dance, Curtain Call, and Will You Be There?. The same year, Chae starred in the web drama Be Positive alongside EXO's Do Kyung-soo.

In 2017, Chae was cast in the teen drama Girls' Generation 1979.

In 2018, Chae starred in the romantic comedy drama Coffee, Do Me a Favor.

In 2019, Chae made a short appearance in the romantic fantasy drama Melting Me Softly along with Ji Chang Wook. The same year, Chae starred in the romantic drama Yeonnam Family as the main lead alongside Na In Woo.

== Personal life ==
On March 14, 2024, Ghost Studio announced that Chae would marry her non-celebrity boyfriend in April. The couple married in a private ceremony on April 7, 2024.

== Filmography ==
=== Film ===
Year	Title	Role
2014	My Brilliant Life	Lee Seo-ha
2016	Overman	Soo-hyeon / Se Young
2016	Curtain Call	Seul-gi
2016	Will You Be There?	Young Yeon-ah
2017	Write or Dance	Go-un
2022	Late Night Cafe : Missing Honey	Namgoong yoon

=== Television series ===
Year	Title	Role	Notes
2006	Over the Rainbow	young Jung Hee-soo	
2016	Be Positive	Bang Hye-jung	Web drama
2017	Girls' Generation 1979	Park Hye-joo	Main Lead
2018	Coffee, Do Me a Favor	Oh Go-woon	Main Lead
2019	Melting Me Softly	Na Ha-yeong (young)	Supporting
2019	Yeonnam Family	Jeong Joo Yeon	Main Lead

=== Music video appearances ===
Year	Album	Song	Artist
2015	Yoon Jong Shin Monthly Project 2015 August	"The Missing Girls"	Yoon Jong-shin feat. Lucite Tokki

== Musical ==
Year	Title	Role
2011	Catch a Timid Man	Lee Sang-hae
