= Girls' Generation 1979 =

2017 South Korean television series

- Promotional poster
- Hangul: 란제리 소녀시대
- Lit.: Lingerie Girls' Generation
- RR: Ranjeri sonyeosidae
- MR: Ranjeri sonyŏsidae
- Genre: Coming-of-age; Teen; Mystery
- Based on: Lingerie Girls' Generation by Kim Yong-hee
- Developed by: KBS Drama Production
- Written by: Yoon Kyung-ah
- Directed by: Hong Seok-gu
- Starring: Bona; Chae Seo-jin; Seo Young-joo; Lee Jong-hyun; Yeo Hoe-hyun; Min Do-hee
- Country of origin: South Korea
- Original language: Korean
- No. of episodes: 8

Production
- Executive producers: Ahn Suk-joon; Lee Sung-jin; Min Hyun-il; Moon Joon-ha
- Producer: Noh Sang-hoon
- Camera setup: Single-camera
- Running time: 60 minutes
- Production companies: FNC Add Culture; Signal Entertainment Group

Original release
- Network: KBS2
- Release: September 11 – October 3, 2017

Girls' Generation 1979 (Korean: 란제리 소녀시대) is a South Korean television series based on the 2009 novel of the same name by Kim Yong-hee. The drama slated for eight episodes with 1970s Daegu as the backdrop. It premiered on KBS2 on September 11, 2017, and aired every Monday and Tuesday at 22:00 (KST).

== Synopsis ==
Lee Jung-hee is the second daughter of a family who owns a lingerie factory. She leads a group of teenage girls who have chaotic adventures together. She meets Bae Dong-moon through a group date, and Dong-moon immediately falls for her. However, Jung-hee has a crush on Son Jin, a cute looking senior student of a boys school, and begins to follow him around to attract his attention.

One day, Park Hye-joo, a transfer student from Seoul, joins their class and becomes the center of attention, creating jealousy and friction among the heroine and her friends. Despite Jung-hee's attention, Son Jin is attracted to Hye-joo. However, Hye-joo has no romantic feelings for Son Jin, as she is interested in Joo Young-choon, an ex-gangster now turned local handyman.

This is the story of their growing friendship, as the heroine and the new girl start to bond despite their initial rivalry.

There is also a darker side to the story, with a mystery surrounding an increasing number of sexual assaults in the city. And at the local toy factory, female workers begin disappearing one by one.

== Cast ==
=== Main ===
- Bona as Lee Jung-hee

A girl who is a late bloomer that has a crush on a senior boy from a neighbourhood school.

- Chae Seo-jin as Park Hye-joo

A girl who transferred from Seoul with her father. She is a smart, mature, kindhearted, and pretty girl who is the neighbour of Lee Jung-hee, that happens to be in the same class as her in school. She immediately gets the attention of the neighbourhood boys.

- Seo Young-joo as Bae Dong-moon

A typical nerd who is head over heels for Lee Jung-hee, and does his best to win her heart.

- Lee Jong-hyun as Joo Young-choon

A former gangster who turns out to be a kindhearted and a reliable handyman in the neighbourhood. He is a hard worker who does multiple jobs in a local pharmacy. He also works as a carpenter, mover and a technician — all to look after his young sister.

- Yeo Hoe-hyun as Son Jin

A popular, cute and handsome guy in town who is the dream guy for many girls at that time. He is the only son of a high-ranking police officer. Despite being the centre of attention of many girls, he has an unrequited crush on Park Hye-joo.

- Min Do-hee as Shim Ae-sook

A bully who is rebellious in school, and has family problems.

=== Supporting ===
==== Jung-hee's family ====
- Kwon Hae-hyo as Jung-hee's father
- Kim Sun-young as Jung-hee's mother
- Park Ha-na as Hong Do-hwa, Jung-hee's aunt
- Jo Byeong-kyu as Lee Bong-soo, Jung-hee's brother

==== Junghyeon Girls' High School ====
- In Gyo-jin as Oh Man-sang, Maths teacher
- Kim Jae-hwa as drill instructor
- Baek Eun-kyung as Jun Hyun-hee
- Bang Su-jin as Kim Eon-joo
- Seo Ye-seul as Soh Eun-ja
- Kim Su-hyeon as Kim Ki-ryeo
- Lee Bom as Park Gwi-ja
- Jo Mi-nyeo as Han Ma-eun

==== Others ====
- Ahn Bo-hyun as Young-choon's friend
- Jo Duk-hyun as Hye-joo's father
- Han Geu-rim as Unni #3
- Jo Ah-in as Joo Aeng-cho, Young-choon's sister
- Lee Chae-kyung as Son Jin's mother

== Production ==
The first script reading meeting of the cast was held on August 18, 2017, at KBS Annex Building in Yeouido, Seoul.

== Original soundtrack ==
=== Part 1 ===
Released on September 13, 2017
No.	Title	Lyrics	Music	Artist	Length
1.	"Again, We Meet" (다시 우리 만나도)	Han Seung-hoon	Han Seung-hoon, Kim Chang-rak, Jung Jin-wook	Jaeyoon (SF9)	03:43
2.	"Like You (Drama Ver.)" (반하겠어 (Drama Ver.))	Kim Cheol-min, Shin Seung-ik, Denis Seo	Kim Cheol-min, Shin Seung-ik, Denis Seo	HONEYST	03:51
3.	"Again, We Meet" (Inst.)		Han Seung-hoon, Kim Chang-rak, Jung Jin-wook		03:43
Total length:					11:17

=== Part 2 ===
Released on September 19, 2017
No.	Title	Lyrics	Music	Artist	Length
1.	"Love Girl" (사랑소녀)	Go Jin-young, Jung Jin-wook	Go Jin-young, Jung Jin-wook	Hyejeong (AOA)	03:41
Total length:					03:41

== Ratings ==
- In this table, the blue numbers represent the lowest ratings and the red numbers represent the highest ratings.
- NR denotes that the drama did not rank in the top 20 daily programs on that date.

Ep.	Original broadcast date	Average audience share			
Ep.	Original broadcast date	TNmS		AGB Nielsen	
Ep.	Original broadcast date	Nationwide	Seoul	Nationwide	Seoul
1	September 11, 2017	4.7% (NR)	5.2% (NR)	4.3% (NR)	4.8% (NR)
2	September 12, 2017	4.8% (NR)	5.3% (NR)	4.8% (NR)	5.4% (NR)
3	September 18, 2017	4.8% (NR)	5.3% (NR)	4.1% (NR)	4.6% (NR)
4	September 19, 2017	5.0% (NR)	5.8% (NR)	4.1% (NR)	4.9% (NR)
5	September 25, 2017	5.0% (NR)	5.2% (NR)	4.2% (NR)	4.4% (NR)
6	September 26, 2017	5.3% (NR)	5.4% (NR)	4.7% (NR)	4.8% (NR)
7	October 2, 2017	4.5% (NR)	4.8% (NR)	4.4% (NR)	4.7% (NR)
8	October 3, 2017	3.8% (NR)	3.9% (NR)	3.7% (NR)	3.8% (NR)
Average		4.7%	5.1%	4.3%	4.7%

== Awards and nominations ==
Year	Award	Category	Nominee(s)	Result
2017	31st KBS Drama Awards	Best Actor in a One-Act/Special/Short Drama	Yeo Hoe-hyun	Won
2017	31st KBS Drama Awards	Best Actor in a One-Act/Special/Short Drama	Seo Young-joo	Nominated
2017	31st KBS Drama Awards	Best Actress in a One-Act/Special/Short Drama	Bona	Nominated
2017	31st KBS Drama Awards	Best New Actress	Bona	Nominated
2017	31st KBS Drama Awards	Best Supporting Actor	In Gyo-jin	Nominated
2017	31st KBS Drama Awards	Best Supporting Actress	Kim Sun-young	Nominated
