= Last (TV series) =

2015 South Korean television series

- Promotional poster
- Genre: Crime; Action; Thriller; Drama
- Based on: Last by Kang Hyung-kyu
- Written by: Han Ji-hoon
- Directed by: Jo Nam-kook
- Starring: Yoon Kye-sang; Lee Beom-soo; Seo Yea-ji; Park Ye-jin; Park Won-sang
- Country of origin: South Korea
- Original language: Korean
- No. of episodes: 16

Production
- Executive producer: Park Joon-seo
- Production companies: AStory; Drama House

Original release
- Network: jTBC
- Release: July 24 – September 12, 2015

Last (Korean: 라스트) is a 2015 South Korean television series based on the webtoon of the same name by Kang Hyung-kyu. Starring Yoon Kye-sang and Lee Beom-soo, it aired on jTBC on Fridays and Saturdays at 20:40 (KST) from July 24 to September 12, 2015 for 16 episodes.

== Synopsis ==
Jang Tae-ho (Yoon Kye-sang) is a successful fund manager whose seemingly fool-proof financial deal goes horribly awry, leading to a loss of ₩35 billion and his business partner's death. In desperate straits, Tae-ho goes on the run from loan shark gangsters and descends into the underbelly of Seoul. He discovers a secret society of homeless people living inside Seoul Station, one that has its own strict hierarchy and rules. Tae-ho vows to find out what went wrong with his deal, claw himself up from rock bottom, and get his life back.

== Cast ==
=== Main ===
- Yoon Kye-sang as Jang Tae-ho
- Lee Beom-soo as Kwak Heung-sam
- Seo Yea-ji as Shin Na-ra
- Park Ye-jin as Seo Mi-joo
- Park Won-sang as Ryu Jong-gu

=== Supporting ===
- Gong Hyung-jin as Cha Hae-jin
- Jeong Jong-jun as Chairman Jo
- Ahn Se-ha as Go Young-chil
- Goo Jae-yee as Yoon Jung-min
- Lee Yong-woo as Kang Se-hoon
- Kim Hyung-kyu as Samagwui ("mantis")
- Lee Cheol-min as Doksa ("poisonous snake")
- Jang Won-young as Akeo ("crocodile")
- Kim Young-woong as Sergeant Bae
- Jo Jae-yoon as Baemnun ("snake eye")
- Yoon Je-moon as Jakdoo ("straw cutter")
- Lee Do-kyeong as President Jung
- Park Hyuk-kwon as Park Min-soo
