= School 2017 =

2017 South Korean television series

- Promotional poster
- Hangul: 학교 2017
- RR: Hakgyo 2017
- MR: Hakkyo 2017
- Genre: Coming-of-age; Teen; Comedy; Romance
- Written by: Jung Chan-mi; Kim Seung-won
- Directed by: Park Jin-suk; Song Min-yeob
- Creative directors: Na Soo-ji; Kim Seok-won; Lee Jung-hyun
- Starring: Kim Se-jeong; Kim Jung-hyun; Jang Dong-yoon; Han Sun-hwa; Han Joo-wan
- Composer: Park Sung-jin
- Country of origin: South Korea
- Original language: Korean
- No. of episodes: 16

Production
- Executive producers: Hwang Chang-woo; Jo Hye-rin; Lee Gun-joon
- Producer: Yoon Jae-hyuk
- Cinematography: Moon Chang-soo; Kim Jae-hwan
- Editor: Kim Byung-rok
- Camera setup: Single-camera
- Running time: 70 minutes
- Production companies: School 2017 SPC; Production H

Original release
- Network: KBS2
- Release: July 17 – September 5, 2017

School 2017 (Korean: 학교 2017; Hanja: 學校 2017; RR: Hakgyo 2017) is a South Korean television series starring Kim Se-jeong, Kim Jung-hyun, Jang Dong-yoon, Han Sun-hwa, and Han Joo-wan. It aired on KBS2 from July 17 to September 5, 2017, every Monday and Tuesday at 22:00 (KST) for 16 episodes. The series is the seventh installment of KBS2's School franchise.

== Synopsis ==
The plot follows a class of high school students attempting to overcome the stress of being ranked by their exam grades, and facing the difficulties of being a teenager in a high-pressure, corrupt system. Its central protagonist is Ra Eun-ho (Kim Se-jeong), a cheerful and kind-hearted 18-year-old who dreams of being a webtoon artist but is caught up in the search for a mysterious troublemaker in the school, known as 'Student X'. When she is accused of being Student X, her dream of going to university to study art is put at risk as she faces expulsion. Hyun Tae-woon (Kim Jung-hyun) is the son of the director of the school who enjoys his youth but hides deep scars. Song Dae-hwi (Jang Dong-yoon) is a bright student who's ranked 1st every time but doesn't have enough money for his dream college.

== Cast ==
=== Main ===
- Kim Se-jeong as Ra Eun-ho

An 18-year-old student who is low-ranked but optimistic and dreams of studying to become a webtoon artist. She comes from a working-class family that owns a chicken restaurant.

- Kim Jung-hyun as Hyun Tae-woon / Student X

The rebellious son of the school's director. He doesn't take school seriously and resents his father. Secretly, as Student X, he plays pranks on the school without revealing his true identity. He was involved in a motorcycle accident in which his best friend Joon-ki died after saving Eun-ho, who later becomes Tae-woon's love interest.

- Jang Dong-yoon as Song Dae-hwi

The school's student president. He is a seemingly perfect student who is always ranked first place, despite coming from a poor family. He is in a relationship with Hong Nam-joo, who comes from a poor family but appears wealthy. He was best friends with Tae-woon and Joon-ki before the accident. However, after the death of Joon-ki, he and Tae-woon fell into a conflicted relationship.

- Han Sun-hwa as Han Soo-ji

A police detective who gets demoted for mishandling a case, and ends up assigned as the school police officer. She is an ace detective and a stickler for rules. She falls in love with teacher Shim Kang-myung.

- Han Joo-wan as Shim Kang-myung

Form teacher for Class 2-1. Though he struggles to speak up against authority, he cares deeply for his students and always believes in them, despite the backlash he receives from school management. He falls in love with the police officer Han Soo-ji.

=== Supporting ===
==== Students ====
- Seol In-ah as Hong Nam-joo

Dae-hwi's girlfriend. She pretends to be from a rich family because she is ashamed of her father's actual profession as a taxi driver. She is frustrated and stressed because of her family's financial struggles.

- Park Se-wan as Oh Sa-rang

Eun-ho's loyal best friend, who is a big fan of Issue. Her mother is a cleaner at the school, and she has given up her dreams to support her mother. She often gets into fights with Eun-ho, but always makes it up.

- Seo Ji-hoon as Yoon Kyung-woo

A guitarist and singer-songwriter who had been educated abroad. He has a crush on Sa-rang. He often comforts her.

- Rowoon as Kang Hyun-il / Issue

An unpopular member of the K-pop boy group Cherry on Top whose stage name is Issue. A transfer student at Eun-ho's school. He is the guy Oh Sa-rang has a crush on.

- Kim Hee-chan as Kim Hee-chan

Son of a prominent prosecutor. He is tutored by Dae-hwi but is jealous of him because he always comes in second place to him. When he was in grade 10, he used to date Seo Bo-ra, but ended up splitting because he is obsessive and abusive. He really wants to prove who X is.

- Hong Kyung as Won Byung-goo

Tae-woon's clueless friend, often seen drinking strawberry milk.

- Han Bo-bae as Seo Bo-ra

A target of bullying in the class. She is afraid to report Young-gun and her other bullies to teachers because of their previous failings. She used to date Kim Hee-chan in grade 10 before she broke up with him for being abusive. She takes a while to trust people and believes in forgiveness. She is a loyal friend to Eun-ho.

- Ji Hye-ran as Yoo Bit-na

Highly-strung daughter of a sought-after plastic surgeon. She is one of Bo-ra's bullies. She often blames everything on herself and overreacts. She uses her money against everyone.

- Ha Seung-ri as Hwang Young-gun

A troublemaker who bullies Bo-ra. She later trains to become a police officer, inspired by Han Soo-ji. She is loyal and will owe up to anyone's mistakes. She is struggling to find a place to belong.

- Kim Min-ha as Yeo Sung-eun

A member of Young-gun's group.

- Song Yoo-jung as Choi Hyun-jung

A member of Young-gun's group.

- Lee Joon-woo as Go Hak-jung
- Ahn Seung-gyun as Ahn Jung-il
- Choi Sung-min as Han Duk-soo

==== School personnel ====
- Lee Jong-won as Hyun Kang-woo

Rich and powerful director of the school. He is the father of Hyun Tae-woon.

- Kim Eung-soo as Yang Do-jin

The school's corrupt principal.

- Park Chul-min as Park Myung-deok

Assistant to the principal, who dreams of being promoted.

==== Teachers ====
- Lee Jae-yong as Koo Young-goo, a strict but fair teacher who succeeds Hyun Kang-woo to become Geumdo High School's principal.
- Min Sung-wook as Jung Joon-soo, a PE teacher who is Shim Kang-myung's rival for police officer Han Soo-ji's affections.
- Jo Mi-ryung as Jang So-ran

==== Ra family ====
- Sung Ji-ru as Ra Sun-bong, Eun-ho's father, who secretly works laying pavements to earn money for Eun-ho to go to extracurricular classes.
- Kim Hee-jung as Kim Sa-bun, Eun-ho's mother. She is seen as strict, but she is very caring. She manages everything around the house.
- Jang Se-hyun as Ra Tae-shik, Eun-ho's brother. He is seen as irresponsible by his family and doesn't have big dreams. All he wants is to be an employee at a company.

==== Extended ====
- Mi Jung as Na Young-ok, Song Dae-hwi's mother.
- Kim Soo-jin as Oh Sa-rang's mother, a cleaner at Geumdo High School.
- Choo Kwi-jung as Kim Hee-chan's mother.
- Kim Jin-woo as Im Joon-ki, Tae-woon and Dae-hwi's late best friend.
- Shin Yun-sook as Im Joon-ki's grandmother.
- Kim Sun-hwa as Ahn Jung-il's mother.
- Lee Jae-kyung as Parent.
- Song Yoo-hyun as College Academic Counselor.
- Lee Hyun-suk
- Ahn Tae-joon
- Kim Song
- Kim Bo-kyung
- Lee Jae-seo
- Kwon Se-rin
- Shin Joo-hang
- Won Jin-ho
- Kim Si-eun as Lee Min-jung
- Jung Yo-han
- Park Hye-young
- Lee Yoon-ji
- Kim Ji-sung as Ham Yoon-hee
- Choi Moon-kyung
- Yoo Chae-mok
- Lee Se-rang
- Park Ji-yun
- Kim Jae-chul
- Yoo In-soo as Min-joon
- Jo Jae-hyun
- So Joon-hyung
- Lee Mi-kyung
- Park Ok-chul

=== Special appearance ===
- Kang Min-hyuk as Jong-geun (Ep. 1)

A student at Eun-ho's dream college, whom Eun-ho has a crush on.

== Production ==
In May 2017, KBS offered the leading role to Kim You-jung as a follow-up project to her popular series Love in the Moonlight (2016). By June 2017, she officially declined.

The first script reading of the series took place on June 19, 2017, at the KBS Annex Building in Yeouido, Seoul, South Korea.

== Original soundtrack ==
School 2017 OST Album

Soundtrack album by Various artists
- Released: 2017
- Genre: Soundtrack
- Language: Korean
- Labels: Leon Korea; Music&New
- Producers: Lee Woo-hyun (executive), Jung Hee-chul

=== Part 1 ===
Released on July 17, 2017
No.	Title	Lyrics	Music	Artist	Length
1.	"Believe In This Moment" (이 순간을 믿을게)	Shim Hyun-bo	Choi Min-chang	Gugudan	03:16
2.	"Believe In This Moment" (Inst.)		Choi Min-chang		03:16
Total length:					06:32

=== Part 2 ===
Released on July 24, 2017
No.	Title	Lyrics	Music	Artist	Length
1.	"Throbbing Summer Day" (두근두근 여름날)	Shim Hyun-bo	Choi Min-chang, Park Sung-jin	Yozoh	03:20
2.	"Throbbing Summer Day" (Inst.)		Choi Min-chang, Park Sung-jin		03:20
Total length:					06:40

=== Part 3 ===
Released on July 31, 2017
No.	Title	Lyrics	Music	Artist	Length
1.	"Going Home"	Kang Woo-kyung	Jung Sung-am	Tarin	03:24
2.	"Going Home" (Inst.)		Jung Sung-am		03:24
Total length:					06:48

=== Part 4 ===
Released on August 7, 2017
No.	Title	Lyrics	Music	Artist	Length
1.	"Stay In My Life"	Park Geun-cheol; Taeyong; Jung Soo-min	Park Geun-cheol; Jung Soo-min	Taeil, Taeyong, Doyoung (NCT)	03:15
2.	"Stay In My Life" (Inst.)		Park Geun-cheol; Jung Soo-min		03:15
Total length:					06:30

=== Part 5 ===
Released on August 8, 2017
No.	Title	Lyrics	Music	Artist	Length
1.	"Reach To You" (너에게 닿기를)	Lee Sang-joon; Jung Jin-woo	Lee Sang-joon; Cha Gil-wan	Maktub	03:34
2.	"Reach To You" (Inst.)		Lee Sang-joon; Cha Gil-wan		03:34
Total length:					07:08

=== Part 6 ===
Released on August 14, 2017
No.	Title	Lyrics	Music	Artist	Length
1.	"I Pray 4 You"	MATHI; Park Geun-cheol; Jeong Soo-min	Park Geun-cheol; Jeong Soo-min; MATHI	Apink BnN (Bomi, Namjoo)	03:50
2.	"I Pray 4 You" (Inst.)		Park Geun-cheol; Jeong Soo-min; MATHI		03:51
Total length:					07:41

== Ratings ==
Ep.	Original broadcast date	Title	Average audience share			
Ep.	Original broadcast date	Title	Nielsen Korea		TNmS	
Ep.	Original broadcast date	Title	Nationwide	Seoul	Nationwide	Seoul
1	July 17, 2017	"Grade Class Society"	5.9% (NR)	6.4% (NR)	6.5% (NR)	7.0% (NR)
2	July 18, 2017	"About Trouble Kids"	4.2% (NR)	4.5% (NR)	4.8% (NR)	5.1% (NR)
3	July 24, 2017	"Suspect Your Friend"	4.2% (NR)	4.4% (NR)	4.6% (NR)	4.8% (NR)
4	July 25, 2017	"Encounter"	4.1% (NR)	4.6% (NR)	4.6% (NR)	5.0% (NR)
5	July 31, 2017	"Something the Student Evaluation Doesn't Record"	4.2% (NR)	4.5% (NR)	4.2% (NR)	4.4% (NR)
6	August 1, 2017	"The Real Records of Our Lives"	4.6% (NR)	4.8% (NR)	4.7% (NR)	4.9% (NR)
7	August 7, 2017	"Everyone Lies"	4.4% (NR)	4.6% (NR)	4.6% (NR)	4.8% (NR)
8	August 8, 2017	"After the Lie"	4.7% (NR)	4.9% (NR)	5.0% (NR)	5.2% (NR)
9	August 14, 2017	"The Weight Rumors Carry"	4.4% (NR)	4.5% (NR)	4.4% (NR)	4.6% (NR)
10	August 15, 2017	"How to Endure the Weight"	4.4% (NR)	4.6% (NR)	4.7% (NR)	4.9% (NR)
11	August 21, 2017	"Dreams, the Shining Worries"	4.7% (NR)	4.8% (NR)	4.8% (NR)	5.0% (NR)
12	August 22, 2017	"Soaring Up, You"	4.1% (NR)	4.3% (NR)	4.7% (NR)	4.8% (NR)
13	August 28, 2017	"Two People's Lines"	4.3% (NR)	4.5% (NR)	4.4% (NR)	4.6% (NR)
14	August 29, 2017	"How to Face Different Lines"	4.4% (NR)	4.6% (NR)	5.1% (NR)	5.3% (NR)
15	September 4, 2017	"How to Protect You"	4.1% (NR)	4.4% (NR)	4.9% (NR)	5.2% (NR)
16	September 5, 2017	"On My Way to Meet the Real You"	4.6% (NR)	4.7% (NR)	4.5% (NR)	4.8% (NR)
Average			4.8%	5.2%	4.5%	4.9%
In the table above, the blue numbers represent the lowest ratings and the red numbers represent the highest ratings.; NR denotes that the drama did not rank in the top 20 daily programs on that date.

== Awards and nominations ==
Year	Award	Category	Recipient	Result	Ref.
2017	10th Korea Drama Awards	Best New Actress	Kim Se-jeong	Nominated	
2017	1st The Seoul Awards	Best New Actor	Kim Jung-hyun	Nominated	
2017	1st The Seoul Awards	Best New Actress	Kim Se-jeong	Nominated	
2017	31st KBS Drama Awards	Best New Actor	Kim Jung-hyun	Nominated	
2017	31st KBS Drama Awards	Netizen Award - Male	Kim Jung-hyun	Nominated	
2017	31st KBS Drama Awards	Best New Actress	Kim Se-jeong	Won	
2017	31st KBS Drama Awards	Netizen Award - Female	Kim Se-jeong	Nominated	
2017	31st KBS Drama Awards	Best Couple Award	Kim Jung-hyun and Kim Se-jeong	Nominated	
2018	13th Annual Soompi Awards	Best Couple Award	Kim Jung-hyun and Kim Se-jeong	Nominated	
2018	54th Baeksang Arts Awards	Best New Actor	Kim Jung-hyun	Nominated	
2018	54th Baeksang Arts Awards	Best New Actress	Kim Se-jeong	Nominated	

== See also ==
- School (South Korean TV series)
