= The Time (TV series) =

2018 South Korean television series

- Promotional poster
- Hangul: 시간
- Hanja: 時間
- RR: Sigan
- MR: Sigan
- Genre: Romance; Melodrama
- Written by: Choi Ho-chul
- Directed by: Jang Joon-ho
- Starring: Kim Jung-hyun; Seohyun; Kim Jun-han; Hwang Seung-eon
- Composer: Jeung Se-rin
- Country of origin: South Korea
- Original language: Korean
- No. of episodes: 32 (Note: In order to circumvent Korean laws that prevent commercial breaks in the middle of an episode, what would previously have been aired as single 70 minute episodes are now being repackaged as two 35 minute episodes, with two episodes being shown each night with a commercial break between the two.)

Production
- Executive producers: Kim Seung-jo; Son Ji-hyun
- Camera setup: Single-camera
- Running time: 35 minutes
- Production companies: SILKWOOD (Note: Due to unforeseen circumstances, Imagine Asia opted out of co-producing Time and it was replaced by Silkwood, a production company founded by ex-KBS business reporter Kim Seung-jo.); Will Entertainment (Note: A subsidiary of Soribada)

Original release
- Network: MBC
- Release: July 25 – September 20, 2018

The Time (Korean: 시간; RR: Sigan) is a South Korean television series starring Kim Jung-hyun, Seohyun, Kim Jun-han and Hwang Seung-eon. It aired on MBC from July 25 to September 20, 2018.

== Synopsis ==
A man who is terminally ill and facing death does everything that he can in his last days to help a woman whose life he ruined.

== Cast ==
=== Main ===
- Kim Jung-hyun as Cheon Soo-Ho, son of W Group's CEO, and CEO of a restaurant. He is seen as a perfect man. His time is running out due to his failing health.
- Seohyun as Seol Ji-hyun, a bright and optimistic woman who becomes the breadwinner at a young age. Her time hasn't moved on since the death of her sister.
- Kim Jun-han as Shin Min-seok, Ji-hyun's boyfriend. A lawyer of W Group's legal team. He is seen as a trustworthy person.
- Hwang Seung-eon as Eun Chae-ah, Soo-Ho's fiancé. Only daughter of the CEO of Taeyang Group. Her obsession with Soo-Ho causes an accident and she hides behind manipulated time.

=== Supporting ===
==== Cheon Su-ho's family ====
- Choi Jong-hwan as CEO Cheon, CEO of W Group. Soo-Ho's father
- Jeon Soo-kyeong as Jang Ok-soon, W Group's madam and Soo-Ho's stepmother.
- Seo Hyun-woo as Cheon Soo-chul, Soo-Ho's elder half-brother.

==== Seol Ji-hyun's family ====
- Kim Hee-jung as Yang Hee-seok, Ji-hyun's immature mother.
- Yoon Ji-won as Seol Ji-eun, Ji-hyun's younger sister.

==== People around Cheon Su-ho ====
- Jo Byeong-kyu as Kim Bok-kyu
- Joo In-young as Manager Hong
- Kim Yong-joon as Chef Wang
- Kang Min-ah as Miss Yang

==== People around Seol Ji-hyun ====
- Ahn Ji-hyun as Oh Young-hee
- Kim Jung-tae as Geum Tae-sung, a loan shark and Yang Hee-seok's ex-lover.
- Heo Jung-do as Nam Dae-chul

==== People around Shin Min-seok ====
- Choi Deok-moon as Nam Dae-chul

Head of W Group's legal team.

== Production ==
- Jeon So-min was offered the lead female role but declined.
- The script reading was held on April 28, 2018.
- On August 26, 2018, it was announced that lead actor Kim Jung-hyun dropped out of the cast due to health concerns. His agency revealed that there would be no replacement for him and the production crew was working on revising the script for his character to naturally fall out of the story. He officially finished filming on September 3.

== Original soundtrack ==
Time OST

Soundtrack album by Various artists
- Recorded: Early 2018
- Genre: Soundtrack
- Languages: Korean; English
- Labels: Blending Co., Ltd.

=== Part 1 ===
Released on August 2, 2018
No.	Title	Lyrics	Music	Artist	Length
1.	"Time" (시간)	Seo Dong-sung	Park Sung-il	Gaho	03:45
2.	"Time" (Inst.)		Park Sung-il		03:45
Total length:					07:30

=== Part 2 ===
Released on August 16, 2018
No.	Title	Lyrics	Music	Artist	Length
1.	"Close Your Eyes" (눈을 감아)	Lee Chi-hoon	Park Sung-il	Sohyang	04:25
2.	"Close Your Eyes" (Inst.)		Park Sung-il		04:25
Total length:					08:50

=== Part 3 ===
Released on August 23, 2018
No.	Title	Lyrics	Music	Artist	Length
1.	"It Will Pass" (지나간다)	Lee Bo-ram	Eunju-ssi	Owl	04:11
2.	"It Will Pass" (Inst.)		Eunju-ssi		04:11
Total length:					08:22

=== Part 4 ===
Released on August 29, 2018
No.	Title	Lyrics	Music	Artist	Length
1.	"I'm Okay, I'm Not Okay" (괜찮아 괜찮지 않아)	Seo Dong-sung	Park Sung-il	Vincent	04:25
2.	"I'm Okay, I'm Not Okay" (Inst.)		Park Sung-il		04:25
Total length:					08:50

=== Part 5 ===
Released on September 6, 2018
No.	Title	Lyrics	Music	Artist	Length
1.	"Request" (당부)	Seo Dong-sung	Park Sung-il	Bily Acoustie	03:50
2.	"Request" (Inst.)		Park Sung-il		03:50
Total length:					07:40

=== Part 6 ===
Released on September 19, 2018
No.	Title	Lyrics	Music	Artist	Length
1.	"Long Dream"	Lee Chi-hoon	Park Sung-il	Park Ji-woo	03:36
2.	"Long Drema" (Inst.)		Park Sung-il		03:36
Total length:					07:12

Disc 2:
No.	Title	Artist	Length
1.	"Disappear"	Various Artists	4:06
2.	"Decide to Live"	Various Artists	6:28
3.	"Empty Heart"	Various Artists	2:17
4.	"Guardian Angel"	Various Artists	3:06
5.	"Longing in your heart"	Various Artists	3:49
6.	"Protective Love"	Various Artists	3:46
7.	"Regret for wasting time"	Various Artists	5:38
8.	"Sorrow that cannot be shared"	Various Artists	3:49
9.	"Star's Wish"	Various Artists	3:07
10.	"Time and Fate"	Various Artists	3:26
11.	"Want to keep time"	Various Artists	3:12

== Controversy ==
In July 2018, Kim Jung-Hyun was involved in a controversy over his "emotionless" behavior during a press conference. His agency, O& Entertainment, defended him by stating that "Because [Kim Jung Hyun] is spending a lot of time thinking about his character, immersing himself into the life of someone terminally ill every day, he had difficulty maintaining his [physical and mental] condition, and unintentionally made a mistake." In 2021, Kim released an apology letter regarding his behavior during that period, after a local tabloid claimed that he allegedly requested to remove several scenes that included physical contact with his then co-star.

== Ratings ==
- In the table below, the blue numbers represent the lowest ratings and the red numbers represent the highest ratings.
- NR denotes that the drama did not rank in the top 20 daily programs on that date.
- N/A denotes that the rating is not known.

Ep.	Original broadcast date	Average audience share			
Ep.	Original broadcast date	TNmS		AGB Nielsen	
Ep.	Original broadcast date	Nationwide	Seoul	Nationwide	Seoul
1	July 25, 2018	3.1%	3.3%	3.5% (NR)	3.7% (NR)
2	July 25, 2018	3.6%	3.8%	4.0% (NR)	4.2% (NR)
3	July 26, 2018	2.9%	3.1%	3.3% (NR)	3.5% (NR)
4	July 26, 2018	3.8%	4.0%	4.2% (NR)	4.4% (NR)
5	August 1, 2018	2.7%	2.8%	3.1% (NR)	3.2% (NR)
6	August 1, 2018	3.6%	3.7%	4.0% (NR)	4.1% (NR)
7	August 2, 2018	2.4%	2.5%	2.8% (NR)	2.9% (NR)
8	August 2, 2018	3.1%	3.2%	3.5% (NR)	3.6% (NR)
9	August 8, 2018	3.4%	3.5%	3.8% (NR)	4.0% (NR)
10	August 8, 2018	4.2%	4.3%	4.6% (NR)	5.3% (NR)
11	August 9, 2018	3.1%	3.4%	3.7% (NR)	3.8% (NR)
12	August 9, 2018	3.3%	3.5%	3.7% (NR)	3.9% (NR)
13	August 16, 2018	2.5%	2.6%	2.9% (NR)	3.0% (NR)
14	August 16, 2018	3.0%	3.1%	3.4% (NR)	3.5% (NR)
15	August 22, 2018	2.5%	2.6%	2.9% (NR)	3.1% (NR)
16	August 22, 2018	3.3%	3.5%	3.7% (NR)	3.8% (NR)
17	August 29, 2018	2.1%	2.2%	2.6% (NR)	2.7% (NR)
18	August 29, 2018	2.8%	2.9%	3.2% (NR)	3.3% (NR)
19	August 30, 2018	3.7%	4.0%	4.1% (NR)	4.5% (NR)
20	August 30, 2018	4.3%	4.8%	4.7% (NR)	5.0%(NR)
21	September 5, 2018	3.4%	—N/a	2.8% (NR)	—N/a
22	September 5, 2018	3.7%	—N/a	3.2% (NR)	—N/a
23	September 6, 2018	—N/a	—N/a	3.1% (NR)	—N/a
24	September 6, 2018	—N/a	—N/a	3.5% (NR)	—N/a
25	September 12, 2018	—N/a	—N/a	3.1% (NR)	—N/a
26	September 12, 2018	—N/a	—N/a	3.6% (NR)	—N/a
27	September 13, 2018	—N/a	—N/a	3.2% (NR)	—N/a
28	September 13, 2018	—N/a	—N/a	4.0% (NR)	—N/a
29	September 20, 2018	—N/a	—N/a	2.7% (NR)	—N/a
30	September 20, 2018	—N/a	—N/a	3.3% (NR)	—N/a
31	September 20, 2018	—N/a	—N/a	3.6% (NR)	—N/a
32	September 20, 2018	—N/a	—N/a	3.6% (NR)	—N/a
Average		N/A	N/A	3.1%	N/A

- Episodes did not air on August 15 due to the broadcast of the 2018 Asian Games: Soccer Men's Tournament - Preliminary Group E match between South Korean and Bahrain.
- Episodes did not air on August 23 due to the coverage of the 2018 Asian Games.

== Awards and nominations ==
Year	Award	Category	Recipient	Result	Ref.
2018	2nd The Seoul Awards	Popularity Award, Actress	Seohyun	Won	
2018	2018 Korea Best Star Awards	Best Drama Star	Seohyun	Won	
2018	2018 MBC Drama Awards	Top Excellence Award, Actress in a Monday-Tuesday Miniseries	Seohyun	Nominated	
2018	2018 MBC Drama Awards	Excellence Award, Actor in a Wednesday-Thursday Miniseries	Kim Jun-han	Nominated	
2018	2018 MBC Drama Awards	Excellence Award, Actress in a Monday-Tuesday Miniseries	Hwang Seung-eon	Nominated	
2018	2018 MBC Drama Awards	Best Supporting Cast in Wednesday-Thursday Miniseries	Seo Hyun-woo	Nominated	
2018	2018 MBC Drama Awards	Fighting Performer Award	Seohyun	Won	
2018	2018 MBC Drama Awards	Best Couple Award	Kim Jung-hyun and Seohyun	Nominated	
