= Kim You-jung filmography =

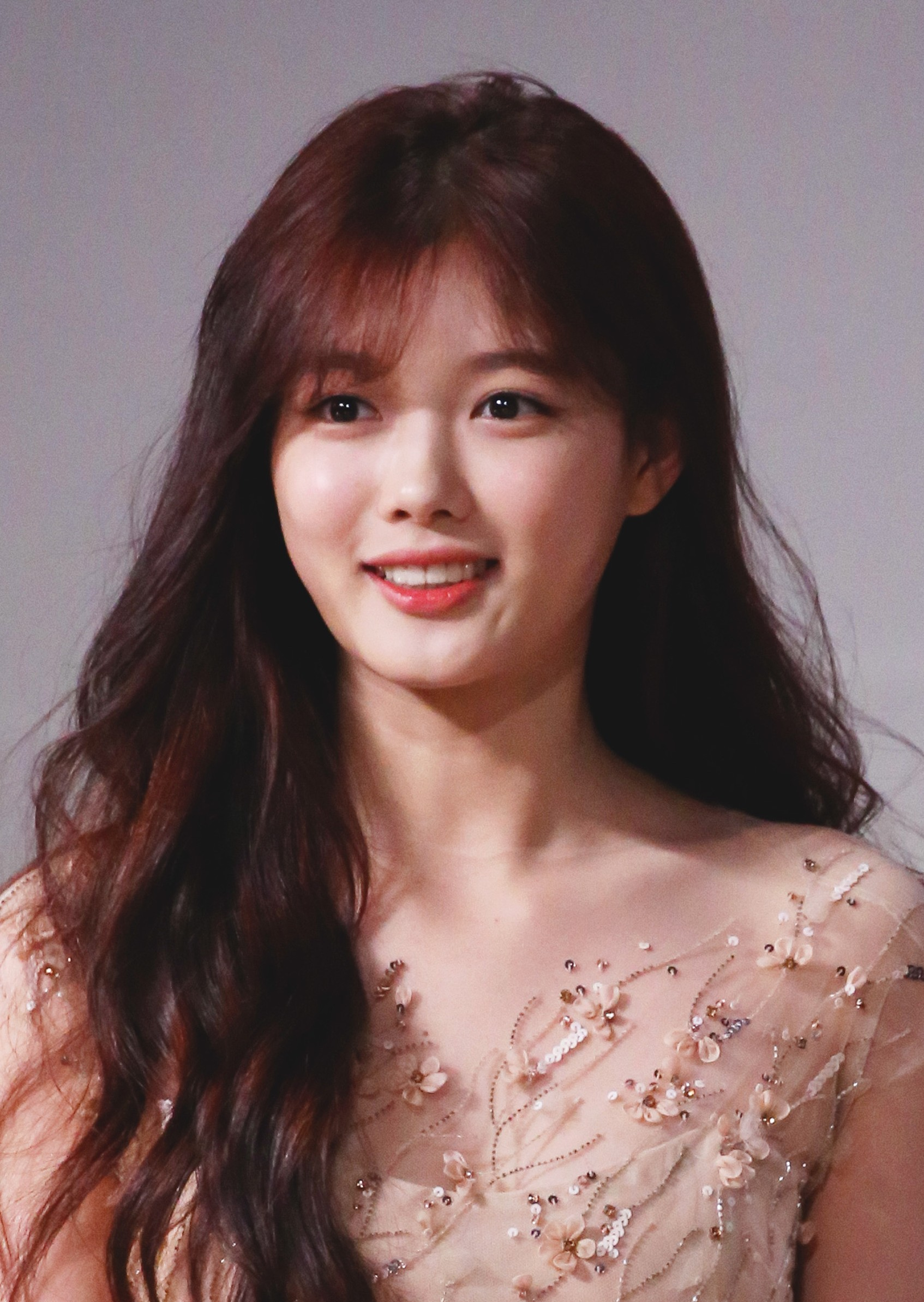
- Kim in 2016
- Film: 24
- Television series: 37
- Web series: 4
- Television show: 44
- Web show: 1
- Documentary: 3
- Hosting: 8
- Music videos: 8
- Narrating: 8

Kim You-jung (Korean: 김유정; born September 22, 1999) is a South Korean actress. After her acting debut in 2003, she became one of the best known child actresses in Korea and since then, has transitioned into teen roles by starring in television series Moon Embracing the Sun (2012), May Queen (2012) and Angry Mom (2015). She hosted music show Inkigayo from November 2014 to April 2016 and took on her first leading role in KBS2's historical drama Love in the Moonlight (2016).

Key
| † | Denotes films that have not yet been released |

== Film ==
| Year | Title | Role | Notes | Ref. |
|---|---|---|---|---|
| 2004 | DMZ | young Lee Soo-hyun | | |
| 2005 | Sympathy for Lady Vengeance | Yoo Jae-kyung | | |
| 2005 | All for Love | Kim Jin-ah | | |
| 2006 | Forbidden Floor | Yeo Joo-hee | | |
| 2006 | Lump Sugar | young Kim Shi-eun | | |
| 2007 | Hwang Jin Yi | young Hwang Jini | | |
| 2007 | Bank Attack | Yeon-hee | | |
| 2007 | Rainbow Eyes | young Lee Yoon-seo / Lee Hae-seo's daughter | | |
| 2008 | The Chaser | Yoo Eun-ji | | |
| 2008 | Unforgettable | Jang Young-mi | | |
| 2009 | Tidal Wave | Kim Ji-min | | |
| 2009 | Living Death | Ji-eun | | |
| 2009 | Paradise | Im Hwa-ran | | |
| 2010 | One Life | Narrator (voice) | Documentary | |
| 2012 | The Nutcracker in 3D | Mary (voice) | Korean dub | |
| 2013 | Commitment | Ri Hye-in | | |
| 2014 | Thread of Lies | Hwa-yeon | | |
| 2014 | Room 731 | Wei | Short film | |
| 2015 | Circle of Atonement | Lee Jung-hyun | | |
| 2017 | Because I Love You | Jang Soo-yi (Scully) | | |
| 2018 | Golden Slumber | Soo-ah | Cameo | |
| 2021 | The 8th Night | Ae-ran | | |
| 2022 | 20th Century Girl | Na Bo-ra | | |
| 2023 | My Heart Puppy | Ah-min | Cameo | |
| TBA | Revenger † | | | |

== Television series ==
| Year | Title | Role | Notes | Ref. |
|---|---|---|---|---|
| 2004 | Freezing Point | Choi Eun-yi | | |
| 2006 | Thank You Life | Yoo Hyun-ji | | |
| 2006 | MBC Best Theater: "A Teddy Bear's Smile" | Moon Ah-young | One-act drama | |
| 2006 | Princess Hours | young Shin Chae-kyeong | | |
| 2006 | My Beloved Sister | Pink / Choi Ga-eul | | |
| 2007 | Belle | Jung Da-jung | | |
| 2007 | Evasive Inquiry Agency | young Yoo Eun-jae | | |
| 2007 | New Heart | Yoon-ah | Cameo | |
| 2008 | Iljimae | young Byun Eun-chae | | |
| 2008 | Formidable Rivals | Yoo Kkot-nim | | |
| 2008 | Painter of the Wind | young Shin Yun-bok | | |
| 2009 | Cain and Abel | young Kim Seo-yeon | | |
| 2009 | Queen Seondeok | 10-year-old Princess Cheonmyeong | | |
| 2009 | Tamra, the Island | Jang Beo-seol | | |
| 2009 | Temptation of an Angel | young Joo Ah-ran | | |
| 2010 | Dong Yi | young Dong Yi | | |
| 2010 | Road No. 1 | young Kim Soo-yeon | | |
| 2010 | Grudge: The Revolt of Gumiho | Yeon-yi | | |
| 2010 | Flames of Desire | young Yoon Na-young / young Baek Soo-bin | | |
| 2010 | Pure Pumpkin Flower | young Park Soon-jung | | |
| 2011 | Mom, I'm Sorry | Ga-young | | |
| 2011 | Gyebaek | Ga-hee | | |
| 2012 | Moon Embracing the Sun | young Heo Yeon-woo | | |
| 2012 | May Queen | young Chun Hae-joo | | |
| 2013 | Golden Rainbow | young Kim Baek-won | | |
| 2014 | Drama Special: "The Dirge Singer" | Yeon Shim | One-act drama | |
| 2014 | Secret Door | young Seo Ji-dam | Eps. 1–13 | |
| 2015 | Angry Mom | Oh Ah-ran | | |
| 2016 | Love in the Moonlight | Hong Ra-on / Hong Sam-nom | | |
| 2018 | Clean with Passion for Now | Gil Oh-sol | | |
| 2020 | Backstreet Rookie | Jung Saet-byul | | |
| 2021 | Lovers of the Red Sky | Hong Chun-gi | | |
| 2021 | One Ordinary Day | Joong-han's new client | Special appearance (ep. 8) | |
| 2023–2024 | My Demon | Do Do-hee | | |
| 2024 | Chicken Nugget | Choi Min-ah | Special appearance | |
| 2025 | Dear X | Baek A-jin | | |
| 2026 | 100 Days of Deception | Lee Ga-kyung / Geum Seo-hee | | |

== Web series ==
| Year | Title | Role | Ref. |
|---|---|---|---|
| 2014 | Love Cells | Ne-bi | |
| 2015 | Love Cells 2 | Ne-bi | |

== Television shows ==
| Year | Title | Role | Notes | Ref. |
|---|---|---|---|---|
| 2011 | Our Greatest Gift | Narrator | TV documentary | |
| 2011 | A Happy Day | | Episode 'Best prospect of 2011, child actor Kim Yoo-jung' | |
| 2011 | 26th Children's Green Song Contest | Narrator | Recording : Apr 23 – Broadcast : May 5 | |
| 2011 | I Would Really Like to Be on Television | | Children's audition show; Judge | |
| 2011 | Just Like That Show | Host | Children's variety show | |
| 2011–2012 | Just Like That Show 2: Random Expedition | Host | Children's variety show | |
| 2012 | New Life for Children | Narrator | | |
| 2012 | Environment Special | Narrator | episode 503 – Jun 20 | |
| 2013 | New Life for Children | Narrator | May 3 | |
| 2013 | From Daejanggeum to Nagasu (special Daejanggeum 10 years) | Host | with Choi Jin-hyuk, Kim Sung-joo, and Lee Young-ae – Oct 18 | |
| 2013 | I'm Real Kim Yoo-jung in L.A. | Main Cast | | |
| 2014 | Seven Tasters | Cast member | May 30 – Aug 29; Travel-reality show | |
| 2014 | Hometown Theater | Narrator | Jul 26; 'Punggeum of My Heart' | |
| 2014–2016 | Inkigayo | Host | Nov 16, 2014 – Apr 3, 2016 | |
| 2015 | Jin Sil's Mother II: Hwanhee and Joonhee | Narrator | TV documentary; June 1 | |
| 2016 | A Young Girl Wearing a Veil | Narrator | TV documentary; Feb 22 | |
| 2019 | '100 Years of Spring' on The Eve of 100th Anniversary of 3.1 Movement | Host | with Jin-young; Feb 28 | |
| 2019 | When That Day Comes | Narrator | Factual documentary drama, a special feature of 100th Anniversary of 3.1 Movement (Part 2);Mar 1 – 2 | |
| 2019 | Kim Yoo Jung's Half Holiday in Italy | Main cast | | |
| 2021 | Gungon Project, Changdeokgung on Moonlight | | Two weeks from November 17 ; Gungon Project' Changdeokgung on Moonlight Tour | |
| 2022 | Young Actors' Retreat | Cast member | | |

== Hosting ==
| Year | Title | Notes | Ref. |
|---|---|---|---|
| 2020 | 2020 SBS Drama Awards | with Shin Dong-yub | |
| 2021 | 2021 SBS Drama Awards | with Shin Dong-yub | |
| 2023 | 2023 SBS Drama Awards | with Shin Dong-yub | |

== Music video appearances ==
| Year | Title | Artist | Ref. |
|---|---|---|---|
| 2004 | "White Christmas" | Various Artists | |
| 2011 | "VVIP" | Seungri | |
| 2012 | "Return" | Lee Seung-gi | |
| 2012 | "Going to You" | Take Hyun | |
| 2013 | "Gone" | JIN | |
| 2013 | "Srrr" | SunBee | |
| 2015 | "7E77 ME B43Y" | Lim Seulong | |
| 2019 | "Begin Again" | Kim Jae-hwan | |
