= Officer Black Belt =

2024 South Korean action comedy film

- Promotional release poster
- Hangul: 무도실무관
- Lit.: The Martial Arts Officer
- RR: Mudo silmugwan
- MR: Mudo silmugwan
- Directed by: Jason Kim
- Written by: Jason Kim
- Produced by: Byun Seung-min; Jang Joo-yeon
- Starring: Kim Woo-bin; Kim Sung-kyun
- Cinematography: Lee Tae-woo
- Edited by: Kim Seon-mi
- Music by: Gu Ja-hwan
- Production companies: Climax Studio; Seven O Six
- Distributed by: Netflix
- Release date: September 13, 2024
- Country: South Korea
- Language: Korean

Officer Black Belt (Korean: 무도실무관) is a South Korean action comedy film directed and written by Jason Kim, and starring Kim Woo-bin and Kim Sung-kyun. The film tells the story of a contract martial arts officer under the Ministry of Justice who closely manages parolee subject to electronic ankle bracelets, assists probation officers in their work, and suppresses verbal and physical abuse and violence that occurs in emergencies with martial arts. It was released on Netflix on September 13, 2024.

== Plot ==
Lee Jung-do is a black belt in taekwondo, kendo, and judo who spends his days playing video games with his nerdy friends when not working as a delivery rider for his father's fried chicken restaurant. After one such delivery, Jung-do helps supervisor probation officer Cho Min-jo in subduing a violent parolee who was caught violating his probation. After receiving a commendation for his help, probation department manager Kim Sun-min persuades Jung-do to join up as a "martial arts officer", who use their skills to handle aggressive probation violators, with Sun-min serving as his partner and mentor. After taking on the job, the two become fast friends and Jung-do soon considers Sun-min to be like an older brother to him. Their work also instils a strong sense of justice in Jung-do.

Notorious child molester Kang Ki-jung is released from prison on parole and Sun-min and Jung-do are assigned to keep tabs on him. Despite their constant surveillance, Ki-jung manages to reunite with his friend and accomplice Han Byung-soon and meets with dark web pornographer Kim Min-wook who requests Ki-jung film child exploitation material for him. A young girl is kidnapped by them and Sun-min, Min-jo and Jung-do are tricked into going to different locations as a distraction where they are ambushed by former parolees seeking revenge. Min-jo is killed and Sun-min is left with a serious neck injury in the ambush but Jung-do manages to escape his attackers. He races to Ki-Jung's apartment building, where he realizes that Ki-jung and Byung-soon are hiding in the basement and confronts them. He fights Ki-Jung, who leaves Jung-do seriously injured and manages to escape with Byung-soon, but the girl is rescued unharmed.

With Sun-min recovering in hospital, Jung-do enlists his friends to track down Ki-jung and Byung-soon. They find Min-wook, who reveals that the two have been using a debit card he had given them. Using this information, Jung-do and his friends tracks Ki-jung and Byung-soon to a restaurant. In the subsequent melee, Jung-do takes down Byung-Soon and beats Ki-Jung in a one-on-one fight. Jung-do and his friends are commended for their actions, and he and Sun-min return to duty as probation officers.

== Cast ==
- Kim Woo-bin as Lee Jung-do, a young man who is a skilled martial artist with black belts in taekwondo, kendo, and judo, with three degrees in each discipline's black belt and becomes a martial arts officer
- Kim Sung-kyun as Kim Sun-min, a probation officer who manages parolee wearing electronic ankle bracelets
- Lee Hyun-geol as Kang Gi-jung, a serial child sex offender who was convicted and served a 20-year sentence for sexually assaulting 15 children
- Park Ji-yeol as Cho Min-jo, a supervisor martial arts officer
- Lee Joong-ok as Han Byung-soon
- Kim Yo-han as Moisture, Jung-do's close friend who is good at using drones
- Kang Hyung-suk as Writer K, Jung-do's close friend who is a screenwriter
- Cha Wang-hyun as Earthworm, Jung-do's close friend who doesn't get angry easily
- Kang Seung-ho as Kim Min-wook, a distributor of child pornography on dark web
- Son Sang-yeon as Lee Yang-ho, an offender who was convicted for raping a middle-school girl
- Park Jong-hee as Kim Geum-nam, an offender who was convicted for sex crime
- Choi Hwan-yi as Ahn Joong-ho, Moisture's older brother who is good at computers
- Jin Mi-sa as Manager Park
- Jang Joon-hyuk as Huh Dong-won, a senior martial arts officer
- Lee Dong-joo as Yoon Dong-ju, an assistant manager probation officer
- Lee Jeong-gwi as Han Dong-joon, an assistant manager probation officer
- Bang Byung-hyun as Park Young-bin
- Joo Hyuk as Min-wook's bodyguard
- Ahn Chae-heum as Lee Min-joo
- Woo Sang-ki as Min Do-woong, an offender who was convicted for involuntary manslaughter
- Nam Ji-woo as Lee Jong-in, a convicted offender
- Choi Wooo-gyeom as Choi Dae-hong
- Park Min-gyu as Lee Soon-kyung
- Kim Yool-ho as Detective Choi
- Son Suk-bae as a manager
- Shin Mi-young as Hyun Yoo-jin, Min-joo's aunt
- Jung Ji-ho as Professor Kim

=== Special appearances ===
- Lee Hae-young as Lee Sang-woo, Jung-do's father who runs Munchicken, a chicken restaurant
- Kim Ji-young as Ha Sun-jung, Jung-do's aunt who runs a hair salon
- Ji Jin-hee as the President of South Korea
- Lee Jung-hyun as a self-defense equipment shop clerk
- Kwon Yong-il as a former police profiler

== Production ==
The action comedy film was directed and written by Jason Kim, who worked on Midnight Runners (2017), The Divine Fury (2019), and Bloodhounds (2023–present) and would schedule to began filming in the latter half of 2023. Climax Studio and Seven O Six managed the production.

Kim Woo-bin and Kim Sung-kyun were confirmed as the lead actors of the film which would be released through Netflix.

== Release ==
In August 2024, Netflix announced that Officer Black Belt would be released exclusively on its platform on September 13, 2024.
