= Kim You-jung =

South Korean actress (born 1999)

- Kim in September 2026
- Born: September 22, 1999 (age 27); Seongdong District, Seoul, South Korea
- Education: Goyang High School of Arts
- Occupation: Actress
- Years active: 2003–present
- Agent: Awesome ENT
- Works: Filmography; discography; theater
- Awards: Full list

Korean name
- Hangul: 김유정
- RR: Gim Yujeong
- MR: Kim Yujŏng

Signature
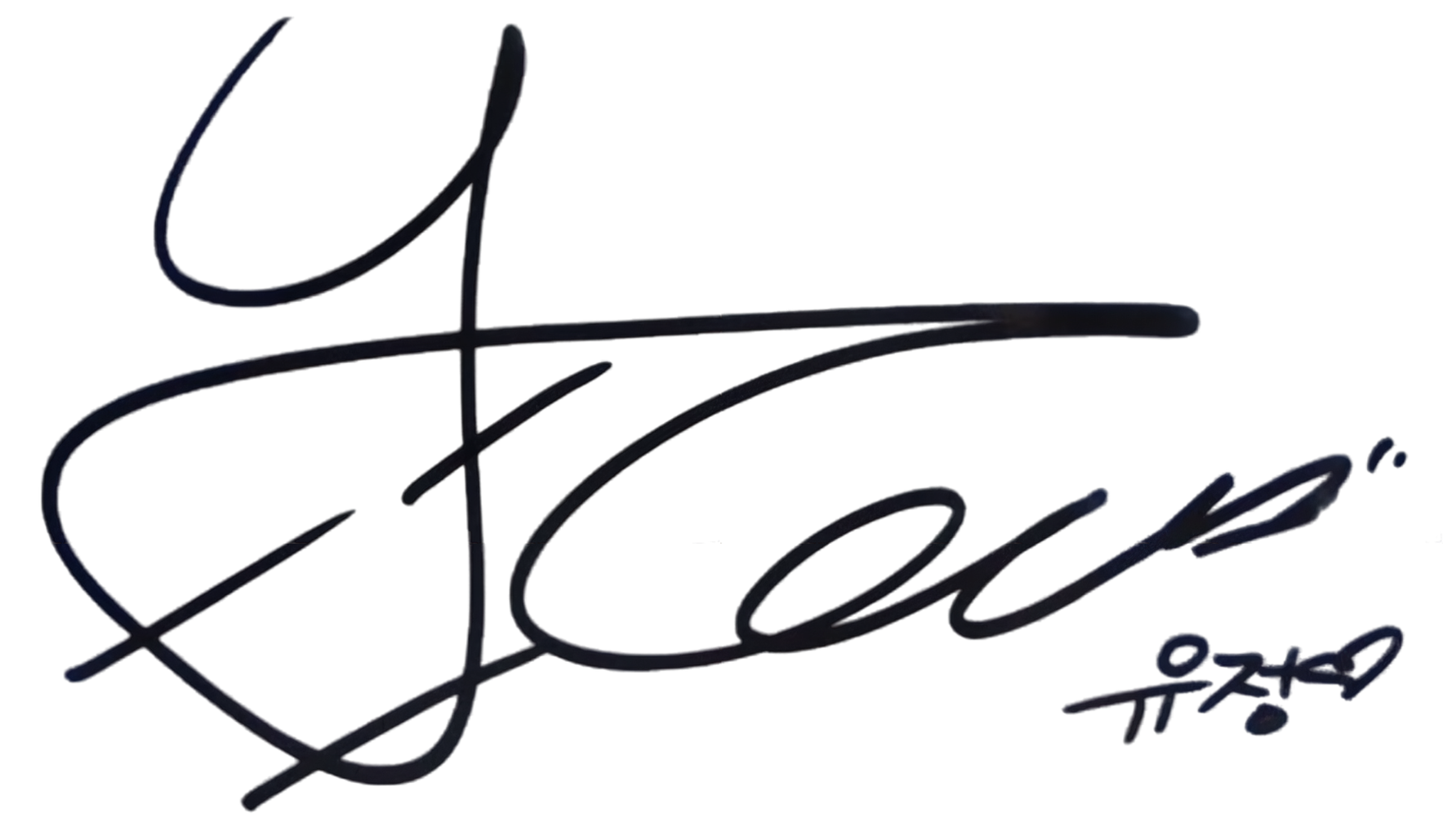

Kim You-jung (Korean: 김유정; born September 22, 1999) is a South Korean actress. She started out as a model for a confectionery brand at the age of four and after her acting debut in 2003, Kim became one of the most in-demand child actresses in South Korea leading her to be called "Nation's Little Sister". Kim had her first starring role in the historical romance Love in the Moonlight in 2016 which catapulted her to fame as a leading actress in television and film. She ranked 8th on the Forbes Korea Power Celebrity list in 2017, the youngest to be included in the Top 10 at the age of 17.

Through her roles in several acclaimed historical television series in her teens, Kim has been referred to as "Sageuk Fairy" by media outlets. Since then, she further received attention for her performances in the romantic-comedy Backstreet Rookie (2020), historical fantasy Lovers of the Red Sky (2021), teen romance film 20th Century Girl (2022), fantasy romance My Demon (2023–2024), and psychological thriller Dear X (2025). She gained the nicknames "Nation's First Love" following her performance in 20th Century Girl.

== Early life and education ==
Kim was born in Seongdong District, Seoul, South Korea on September 22, 1999 as the youngest of three siblings. Her older sister, Kim Yeon-jung, debuted as an actress in 2017. She attended Goyang High School of Arts and graduated in January 2018. Kim deferred taking the national College Scholastic Ability Test in 2017, and instead decided to focus on her acting career.

== Career ==
=== 2003–2011: Beginnings as a child model and actress ===
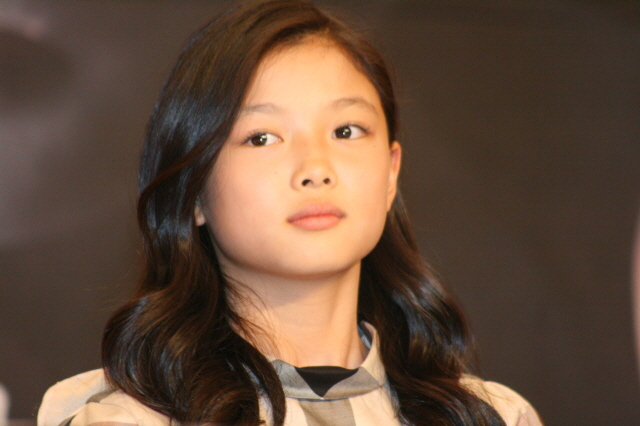
Kim in July 2010

Kim debuted as a model for a confectionery brand at the age of four. After her acting debut when she was four, she quickly became one of the most in-demand child actresses in Korea. By the time she was a fifth grader, Kim had already appeared in 13 television dramas and 15 films.

In 2008, she received her first acting award as Best Child Actress for action-adventure series Iljimae and historical drama Painter of the Wind. This was followed by acclaimed performances in Dong Yi (2010) and Flames of Desire (2010). Grudge: The Revolt of Gumiho (2010) marked Kim's first major role that wasn't the childhood counterpart of the female protagonist.

=== 2012–2015: Rising popularity and teen roles ===
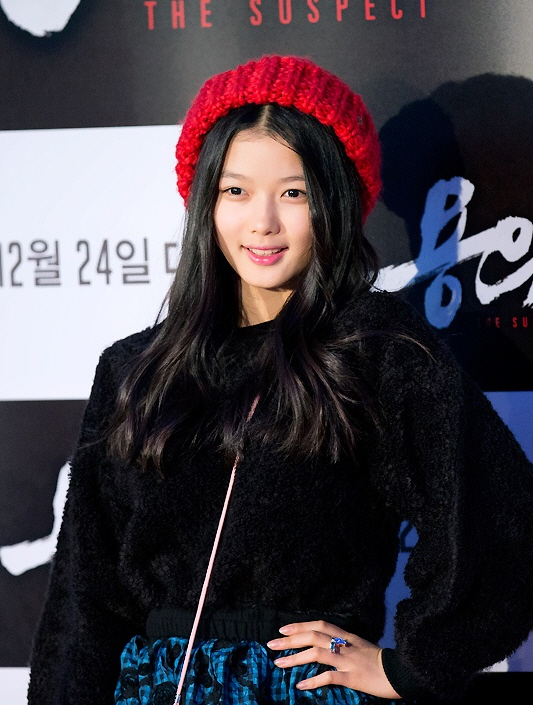
Kim in July 2014

She rose to popularity in 2012 when she starred in the fantasy-period drama Moon Embracing the Sun, which reunited Kim with Grudge: The Revolt of Gumiho costar Lee Tae-ri and Iljimae costar Yeo Jin-goo. Moon surpassed 40% ratings and gained "national drama" status. For her good portrayal of the young protagonist, she was nominated for Best New Actress in the 48th Baeksang Arts Awards, and she won Best Young Actress Award in the 1st K-Drama Star Awards and 2012 MBC Drama Awards. She followed this with a well-received turn in May Queen (2012) and a supporting role in the 2013 film Commitment, and family drama Golden Rainbow (2013).

In 2014, Kim's performance as a teenage bully in Thread of Lies drew critical acclaim and she was nominated for the Best New Actress in Blue Dragon Film Awards. She next played a traditional funeral singer (or "gok-bi") in the single-episode Drama Special anthology, and was cast in the horror mystery Room 731, an English-language graduate thesis film by USC filmmaker Kim Young-min. This was followed by a starring role in the period drama Secret Door. Kim also began hosting music show Inkigayo in November 2014 and left the show in April 2016.

In 2015, she starred in the television series Angry Mom which tackled bullying and school violence. The same year, she reprised her role as a cat-turned-woman in Love Cells, a two-season web series adapted from the webtoon of the same title and played a murderer's daughter in the thriller film Circle of Atonement.

=== 2016–2021: Leading roles ===
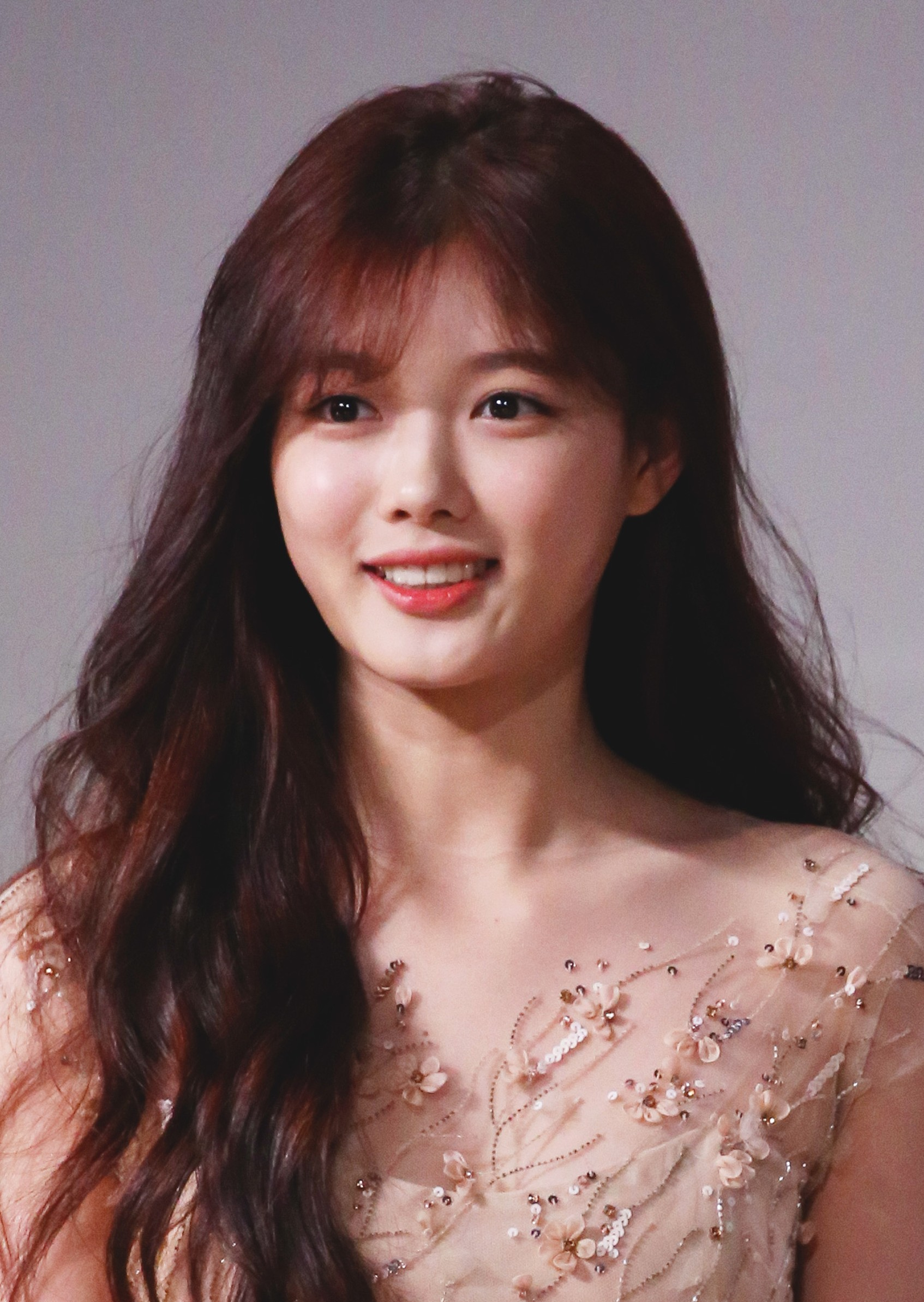
Kim at the MAMA Awards red carpet in 2016

In August 2016, Kim starred in her first adult leading role in the youth historical drama Love in the Moonlight as Hong Ra-on - a girl who was raised as a boy and eventually became a eunuch of Crown Prince of Joseon, played by Park Bo-gum. A domestic hit, Moonlight achieved peak audience rating of 23.3% and its popularity was referred to as "Moonlight Syndrome". Kim won an Excellence Award for portraying Moonlight's cross-dressing heroine at the 30th KBS Drama Awards. It also earned her a Baeksang Arts Award for Most Popular Actress – Television.

In 2017, she starred with Cha Tae-hyun in the romantic-comedy film Because I Love You. In 2018, Kim starred in the romantic-comedy drama Clean with Passion for Now, based on the webtoon of the same name. She played an employee at a cleaning company who doesn't care about dirtiness.

In 2020, Kim was cast in the romantic-comedy drama, Backstreet Rookie, alongside Ji Chang-wook, based on a webtoon with the same name. She acted as Jung Saet-byul, a former high school troublemaker who becomes a part-time employee at a convenience store. Kim attended action school in order to perform her own stunts. During the 2020 SBS Drama Awards held on December 31, 2020, Kim was chosen to be the main host together with Shin Dong-yup. At the same event, Kim was awarded Excellence Award, Actress in a Miniseries Fantasy/Romance Drama for her acting in the series Backstreet Rookie.

In December 2020, Kim was confirmed as the female lead role in the historical-fantasy drama Lovers of the Red Sky. Adapted from the novel written by Jung Eun-gwol, the drama premiered in August 2021 on SBS TV and Kim played the titular role of Hong Chun-gi, the Joseon dynasty's only female painter, alongside Ahn Hyo-seop as Ha Ram, a blind astrologer. The series reunited Kim with director Jang Tae-yoo after 13 years since Painter of the Wind (2008) where Kim played the childhood counterpart of the protagonist. That same year, Kim also appeared in the mystery thriller Netflix film The 8th Night in the role of an enigmatic psychic. In December 2021, she made a cameo appearance in the final episode of Coupang Play's television series One Ordinary Day. At the end of 2021, Kim hosted 2021 SBS Drama Awards with Shin Dong-yup for the second year in a row, receiving Top Excellence Award, Actress in a Miniseries Genre/Fantasy Drama and winning Best Couple Award with Ahn Hyo-seop for the drama Lovers of the Red Sky at the same event.

=== 2022–present: Theater debut and continued success ===
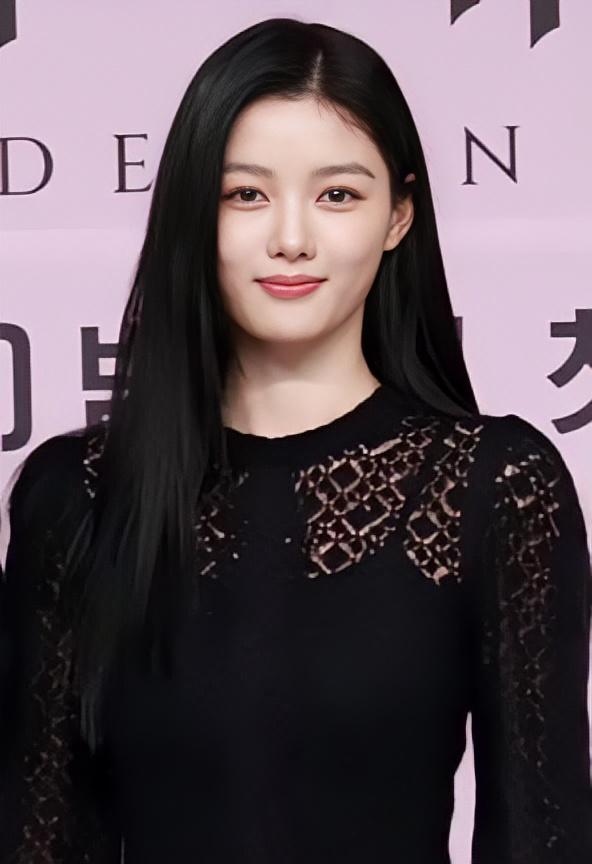
Kim in November 2023

In 2022, Kim reunited with the director and cast members of Love in the Moonlight in the TVING travel entertainment program Young Actors' Retreat. The same year, she appeared in the Netflix film 20th Century Girl playing the title role as 17-year-old Na Bo-ra in 1999.

Kim made her theatrical stage debut in January 2023, taking part in Kim Dong-yeon's play Shakespeare in Love, adapted from the 1998 film of the same name. She played the role of Viola de Lesseps, the daughter of a wealthy merchant, who disguises herself as a man named Thomas Kent to become a theater actress, which was taboo for women at the time. Kim alternate the rooe with Chae Soo-bin and Jung So-min. The play received favorable reviews and Kim's performance was praised by the critics and the audience. In March, she made a special appearance in Jason Kim's film My Heart Puppy as Ah-min, a disabled girl who looks after abandoned dogs. In January, she was also confirmed for SBS television series My Demon. The series was released in November 2023. She portrayed Do Do-hee, a chaebol heiress who get into a contract marriage with Jeong Gu-won (Song Kang), a demon who temporarily loses his powers.

In 2024, Kim made a special appearance in the Netflix original series Chicken Nugget. She portrayed the character Choi Min-ah, the daughter of Choi Seon-man (played by Ryu Seung-ryong), the president of More Than Machines. She mistakenly believes that a new machine in her father company is designed to alleviate fatigue and accidentally turns into a chicken nugget after using it.

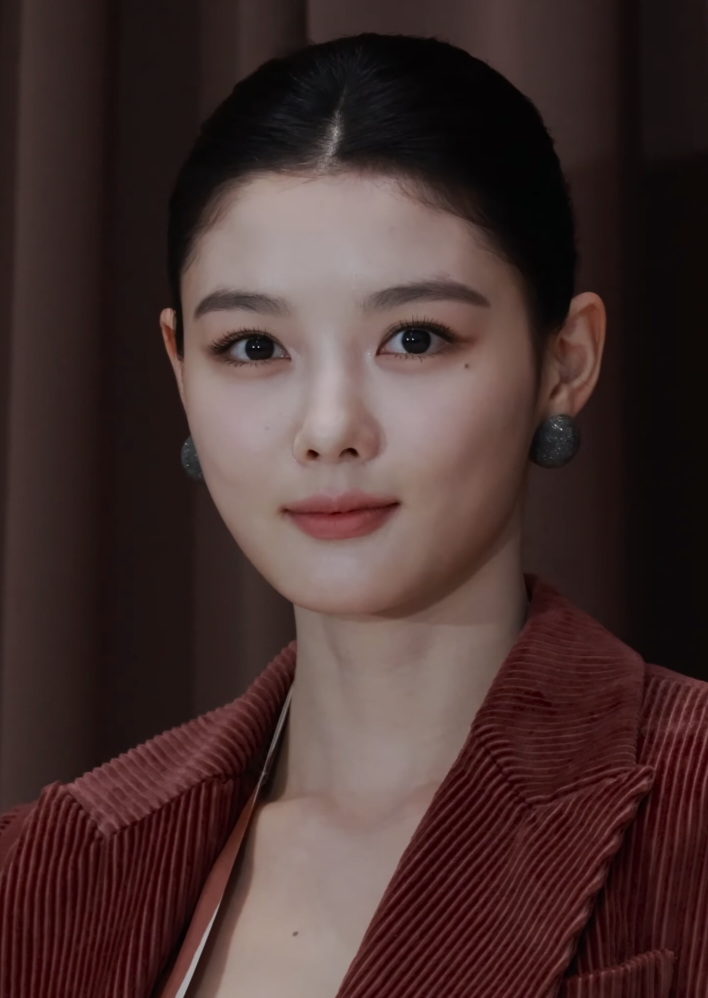
Kim in October 2025

In September 2025, Kim was honored as the inaugural recipient of the Busan International Actors Award at the 30th Busan International Film Festival, recognizing her contributions to the Korean film industry. Later that year, she starred in the TVING original series Dear X, which premiered on November 6, 2025. She played the role of Baek A-jin, a sociopath who hides her cruel nature behind a beautiful appearance, marking a significant transformation in her acting career. Kim's performance received widespread praise with The Korea Times calling it "chilling" which "anchors [the] story about trauma [and] manipulation". The series achieved global success, topping OTT charts in 108 countries shortly after its release.

In 2026, Kim starred as Lee Ga-kyung in the tvN television series 100 Days of Deception, portraying a skilled pickpocket in Japanese-occupied Gyeongseong who becomes an undercover spy for the Korean independence movement.

== Other activities ==
=== Endorsement ===
After making her debut in an advertisement for Crown Confectionery in 2003, Kim appeared in a number of commercials for a variety of brands as a child actress. In 2012, following her appearance in Moon Embracing the Sun, she became an advertising model for Domino's Pizza with Kim Soo-hyun, appeared in a washing machine advertisement for Samsung Electronics with Han Ga-in, became the face of a dairy product by Seoul Milk with Yeo Jin-goo and featured in a video game commercial for Nintendo 3DS with Kim So-hyun.

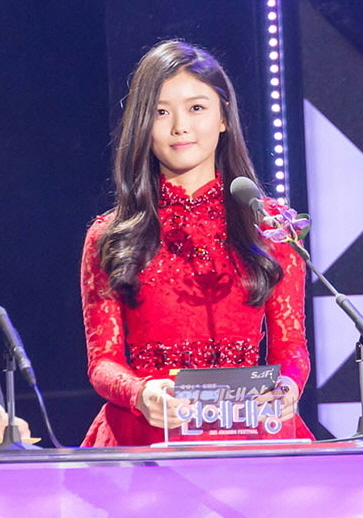
Kim in December 2014

In 2017, Kim became the brand model for South Korean sportswear manufacturer, FILA, and promoted the brand till 2022. In 2018, she became a brand model for cosmetics brand Laneige. In 2021, she was selected as an advertising model for Alcon contact lenses and Torretta – a water/ion supplement drink by Coca-Cola. In January 2022, Kim featured in a 7-minute-long commercial video named Dark Farm for Laneige's Radian-C Cream, which recorded 1.45 million views within 10 days of its release. The same year, she became an advertising model for Hana Bank. In August 2022, BBQ announced that Kim would be its new brand endorser. In August 2023, Nordisk, a Danish premium outdoor brand chose Kim as one of its model along with Ryu Jun-yeol and Choi Woo-sik. In November 2023, she was selected as brand ambassador of Couronne, a women's luxury handbag brand. In December 2023, she was appointed as an exclusive model for the English academy brand Adot English Academy and their online version Adot On.

=== Ambassadorships ===
Year	Title	Notes	Ref.
2004	Korea Association of Children's Adoptive Parents Ambassador		
2010	Cheong Wa Dae Children's newspaper Ambassador		
2010	Food and Drug Administration (KFDA) Child Ambassador		
2012	Ministry of Gender Equality and Family Youth Ambassador	with Lee Tae-ri	
2012	Gyeonggi Anti-Child Abuse Ambassador		
2013	The 58th Memorial Day Big Tree National Love badge	South Korean President Park Geun-hye award	
2014	Seoul Tourism Ambassador	with Jang Hyuk	
2014	9th Conference of the Korean Volunteer Ambassador		
2015	6th Korea Sharing Festival	with Oh Ji-ho	

=== Philanthropy ===
Throughout her career, Kim has consistently engaged in diverse philanthropic endeavors. Her early charitable work often involved collaborative projects with fellow artists and industry organizations. On August 26, 2010, she joined the "Kiss of Love" campaign, which sold products featuring celebrities' lip marks, autographs, and caricatures to support the self-reliance and education of children from low-income families. In December of that year, she joined 33 other Sidus HQ actors in the Love Sharing Hanbok Calendar event to showcase traditional Korean attire, with proceeds donated to Korea Compassion. Her collaborative efforts continued on February 2, 2012, when she joined various actors and models in a photography exhibition for Kolon Sport's 2012 S/S Collection to benefit neighbors in need. Later, in December 2015, Kim joined actors Lee Ki-woo and Hong Jong-hyun to deliver 5,600 briquettes to residents of Baeksa Village in Junggyebon-dong, Nowon District.

Kim has frequently utilized her public image to bolster humanitarian causes through media partnerships. On April 20, 2012, she distributed t-shirts designed by Kathleen Kye as part of a Samsung Electronics "Insight Exhibition" to support students at the Hanbit School for the Blind, meanwhile the donated clothes were delivered to neighbors in need. Between January 9 and 16, 2013, she auctioned a personalized iPhone case to a charity auction held by Gyeonggi Province and Daum's portal site titled Infinite Care Campaign Auction for Neighborhood Love to aid local residents. On November 23, 2013, she participated in Elle magazine's "Share Happiness" project, a collaborative charity initiative involving photo talent donations and relief funds dedicated to supporting women and children in society.

Kim has frequently donated her time in media projects with good cause. On May 5, 2012, she and Yeo Jin-goo provided narration for the MBC documentary New Life to Children, which aired on Children's Day to benefit youth with rare incurable diseases. She returned to MBC on June 1, 2015, donating her entire earnings from the documentary Jin-sil Eomma II to the Samhyewon Child Welfare Center, an organization she had previously supported with food donations. She also joined other prominent stars to record the campaign song "Talk About Love", an initiative by Environment TV to raise funds for climate refugees in Tanzania and Malawi, Africa.

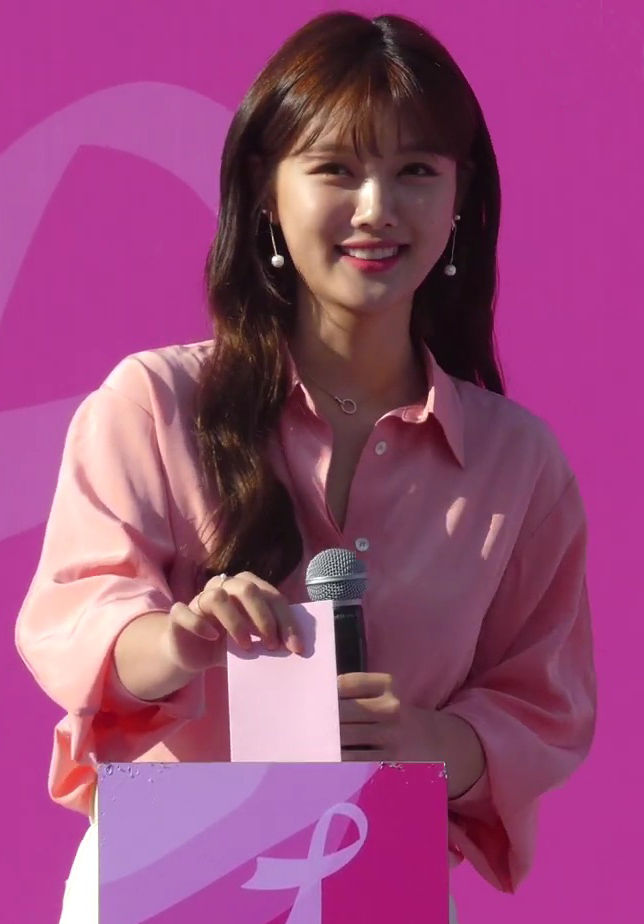
Kim at Seoul Pink Run Competition in October 2019

Kim has been a consistent advocate for medical causes. On August 21, 2014, she participated in the Ice Bucket Challenge to raise funds for ALS research and patient care. She supported the cause again on June 7, 2018, by donating 2.1 million won toward the construction of the Lou Gehrig Care Hospital, accompanying her contribution with a handwritten letter citing health (hypothyroidism) reasons to encourage public interest. On October 13, 2019, she participated in the "Pink Run" Seoul Competition, where her participation fees were donated to the Korea Breast Health Foundation for patient screenings and surgeries.

In October 2019, ChildFund Korea announced that Kim had become the 229th and youngest patron of the Green Noble Club, a group for individuals who have donated at least 100 million won. Since her debut, she has quietly made donations under a pseudonym to assist low-income children during the COVID-19 pandemic and to cover medical expenses for sick youth. On October 1, 2021, she celebrated her birthday by donating 30 million won to the Green Umbrella Children's Foundation to provide emergency living and medical subsidies for children at risk of crime. She made another contribution in February 2024 with a 100 million won donation to the Korea Pediatric Cancer Foundation for the treatment of childhood leukemia and rare diseases. In October 2024, it was revealed that she had personally donated another 100 million won to the Elderly Support Center and the Green Umbrella Hansarang Village. These funds were allocated for dietary products for the elderly and rehabilitation and nursing expenses for children with severe disabilities.

Kim has also responded to disaster relief. In April 2019, Kim made donations to help residents in affected areas caused by the first-ever large forest fire in Gangwon Province. In March 2025, she donated 80 million won through the Hope Bridge National Disaster Relief Association to help with recovery efforts from wildfires that have occurred in the Ulsan, Gyeongbuk, and Gyeongnam regions.

== Personal life ==
=== Health ===
In February 2018, it was revealed that Kim was diagnosed with dysfunctions of the thyroid gland and would take a break from acting.

== Filmography ==
Selected filmography

- Moon Embracing the Sun (2012)
- Love in the Moonlight (2016)
- Backstreet Rookie (2020)
- Lovers of the Red Sky (2021)
- 20th Century Girl (2022)
- My Demon (2023–2024)
- Dear X (2025)
- 100 Days of Deception (2026)

== Discography ==
List of singles, showing year released, and name of the album
Title	Year	Album
"The Most Beautiful Christmas In My Life" (with Lee Byung-joon)	2005	Non-album single
"I Love So Much"	2014	Love Cells OST
"We're Happy"	2014	Non-album single
"Together as One" (with various artists)	2016	Hooxi, The Beginning
"Your Night, Your Star, Your Moon" (with Giriboy)	2021	Dingo Record

== Theater ==
Theater play performances
Year	Title		Role	Venue	Date	Ref.
Year	English	Korean	Role	Venue	Date	Ref.
2008	Chorus of Angels	천사들의 합창	Lee Ha-neul	Seoul Education Center and Culture Center Grand Theater	April 18 to 20	
2017	The Crucible	시련	A Girl / Ann Putnam			
2022	Shakespeare in Love	셰익스피어 인 러브	Viola de Lesseps	CJ Towol Theater	January 28 to March 26	
2023	Shakespeare in Love	셰익스피어 인 러브 - 서울	Viola de Lesseps	Seoul Arts Center CJ Towol Theater	January 28 to March 26	
2023	Shakespeare in Love	셰익스피어 인 러브 - 서울	Viola de Lesseps	Sejong Arts Centre	April 8 to 9	

== Accolades ==
=== Awards and nominations ===
Name of the award ceremony, year presented, category, nominee of the award, and the result of the nomination
Award ceremony	Year	Category	Nominee / Work	Result	Ref.
APAN Star Awards	2012	Best Young Actress	Moon Embracing the Sun	Won	
APAN Star Awards	2016	Best New Actress	Love in the Moonlight	Won	
APAN Star Awards	2021	Excellence Award, Actress in a Miniseries	Backstreet Rookie	Nominated	
APAN Star Awards	2024	Popular Actress Award	Kim You-jung	Nominated	
Asia Artist Awards	2016	Most Popular Actress	Love in the Moonlight	Nominated	
Asia Artist Awards	2016	Best Icon Award, Drama	Love in the Moonlight	Won	
Asia Artist Awards	2025	Best Artist — Actress	Dear X	Won	
Asia Artist Awards	2025	Legendary Couple	Kim You-jung (with Park Bo-gum)	Won	
Asia Star Awards	2022	Face of Asia	Kim You-jung	Won	
Asia Star Entertainer Awards (ASEA)	2026	Best Artist — Actress	Kim You-jung	Nominated	
Asians on Film Festival	2015	Best Ensemble Cast	Room 731	Nominated	
Baeksang Arts Awards	2012	Best New Actress – Television	Moon Embracing the Sun	Nominated	
Baeksang Arts Awards	2017	Most Popular Actress (TV)	Love in the Moonlight	Won	
Blue Dragon Film Awards	2014	Best New Actress	Thread of Lies	Nominated	
Brand Consumer Loyalty Awards	2026	Best Actress (Hot Trend)	Kim You-jung	Nominated	
ContentAsia Awards	2026	Silver, Best Female Lead in a TV Programme/Series Made in Asia	Dear X	Silver	
Director's Cut Awards	2026	Best Actress (Series)	Dear X	Nominated	
Fashionista Awards	2016	Best Fashionista – Beauty Category	Kim You-jung	Nominated	
Fashionista Awards	2017	Best Fashionista – Red Carpet Category	Kim You-jung	Nominated	
FUNdex Awards	2026	Best Actress of OTT Original Drama	Dear X	Pending	
FUNdex Awards	2026	Popular Star Prize - K-Drama Actress	Dear X	Pending	
Global OTT Awards	2026	Best Lead Actress	Dear X	Nominated	
Global OTT Awards	2026	People's Choice Award	Dear X	Nominated	
Grand Bell Awards	2006	Best New Actress	All for Love	Nominated	
Herald Donga TV Lifestyle Awards	2012	Style Icon Rookie	Kim You-jung	Won	
KBS Drama Awards	2010	Best Young Actress	Grudge: The Revolt of Gumiho	Won	
KBS Drama Awards	2010	Netizen Award, Actress	Grudge: The Revolt of Gumiho	Nominated	
KBS Drama Awards	2010	Best Couple Award	Kim You-jung (with Seo Shin-ae); Grudge: The Revolt of Gumiho	Nominated	
KBS Drama Awards	2014	Best Actress in a One-Act/Special Drama	Drama Special: The Dirge Singer	Nominated	
KBS Drama Awards	2016	Top Excellence Award, Actress	Love in the Moonlight	Nominated	
KBS Drama Awards	2016	Excellence Award, Actress in a Mid-length Drama	Love in the Moonlight	Won	
KBS Drama Awards	2016	Best New Actress	Love in the Moonlight	Nominated	
KBS Drama Awards	2016	Netizen Award, Actress	Love in the Moonlight	Nominated	
KBS Drama Awards	2016	Best Couple Award	Kim You-jung (with Park Bo-gum); Love in the Moonlight	Won	
KCCI•Forbes CSR Awards	2026	Positive Influence Award (Actress)	Kim You-jung	Won	
Korea Drama Awards	2012	Best Young Actress	Moon Embracing the Sun	Nominated	
MBC Drama Awards	2010	Best Young Actress	Dong Yi, Flames of Desire	Won	
MBC Drama Awards	2012	Best Young Actress	Moon Embracing the Sun, May Queen	Won	
MBC Drama Awards	2012	Popularity Award	Moon Embracing the Sun	Nominated	
MBC Drama Awards	2012	Best Couple Award	Kim You-jung (with Yeo Jin-goo); Moon Embracing the Sun	Nominated	
MBC Drama Awards	2015	Popularity Award, Actress	Angry Mom	Nominated	
MBC Drama Awards	2015	Top 10 Stars Award	Angry Mom	Won	
Mnet 20's Choice Awards	2012	20's Upcoming 20's	Moon Embracing the Sun	Nominated	
Pierson Movie Festival	2012	Best Child Actress	Moon Embracing the Sun	Won	
Pierson Movie Festival	2014	Trend Choice Best Actress	Kim You-jung	Won	
SBS Drama Awards	2008	Best Young Actress	Iljimae, Painter of the Wind	Won	
SBS Drama Awards	2014	New Star Award	Secret Door	Won	
SBS Drama Awards	2020	Excellence Award, Actress in a Miniseries Fantasy/Romance Drama	Backstreet Rookie	Won	
SBS Drama Awards	2020	Best Couple Award	Kim You-jung (with Ji Chang-wook); Backstreet Rookie	Nominated	
SBS Drama Awards	2021	Best Couple Award	Kim You-jung (with Ahn Hyo-seop); Lovers of the Red Sky	Won	
SBS Drama Awards	2021	Top Excellence Award, Actress in a Miniseries Genre/Fantasy Drama	Lovers of the Red Sky	Won	
SBS Drama Awards	2023	Top Excellence Award, Actress in a Miniseries Romance/Comedy Drama	My Demon	Won	
SBS Drama Awards	2023	Best Couple Award	Kim You-jung (with Song Kang); My Demon	Won	
Style Icon Asia	2016	Awesome Teen Award	Kim You-jung	Won	
Yahoo! Asia Buzz Awards	2016	Top Buzz Star: Female	Kim You-jung	Won	

=== Listicles ===
Name of publisher, year listed, name of listicle, and placement
Publisher	Year	Listicle	Placement	Ref.
Forbes	2017	Korea Power Celebrity 40	8th	
Forbes	2024	30 Under 30 – Korea	Included	
Gallup Korea	2016	Television Actor of the Year	4th	
Gallup Korea	2021	Television Actor of the Year	17th	
Gallup Korea	2024	Television Actor of the Year	23rd	
Gallup Korea	2024	Best Television Couple of the Past Decade (Note: With Park Bo-gum for Love in the Moonlight (2016))	10th	
Korean Film Council	2021	Korean Actors 200 (Note: Introduces 200 actors that best represent the present and future of Korean cinema to the people in the film industry all over the world.)	Included	
Teen Vogue	2025	New Hollywood Class of 2025 (Note: New Hollywood's rising stars. These are the young celebrities shaping up to be the next generation of tastemakers.)	Included	
Times Now India	2025	Top 10 K-Drama Performers Of 2025	Included	
