= Lee Joong-ok =

South Korean actor

- Born: Lee Joong-ok; 17 August 1979 (age 47); South Korea
- Other name: Lee Jung-ok
- Education: University of Daegu (Science)
- Occupation: Actor
- Years active: 2007–present
- Agent: DSP Media

Korean name
- Hangul: 이중옥
- Hanja: 李中玉
- RR: I Jungok
- MR: I Chungok

Lee Joong-ok (born 1979) is a South Korean actor. He is known for his roles in dramas such as Hell Is Other People, Sketch and Hi Bye, Mama!.

== Filmography ==
=== Film ===
Year	Title	Role	Ref.
2007	Secret Sunshine	Hope House employee	
2008	Santamaria	Place of enshrinement employee	
2011	The Cat	Chief Lee	
2014	See, Beethoven	Omitted man	
2014	Broken	Sang Hyun's section chief	
2015	The Umbilical Cord	Psychology Therapist	
2016	4th Place	Administrator Kim	
2016	Train to Busan	Man in western clothes	
2018	Burning	Patrolman	
2018	The Drug King	Yoon Kang-shik	
2019	Extreme Job	Hwan-dong	
2019	Forbidden Dream	Uigeumbu	
2020	Hitman: Agent Jun	Forman	
2021	A Year-End Medley	Executive Director Hotel Emross	
2022	Stellar	Seo's right hand man	
2022	Paroho	Do-woo	
2022	Come Back Home	Jun Cheol	
2022	Heartbeat	Police Officer	
2023	Brave Citizen	Seo Sang-u	
2024	Only God Knows Everything	Hee-joong	
2024	Spring Garden	Detective Nam	
2024	Officer Black Belt	Han Byeong-soon	

=== Television series ===
Year	Title	Role	Ref.
2015	Six Flying Dragons	Peanut warrior	
2018	Sketch	Seo Sang-goo	
2018	Ping Pong Ball	Detective	
2018	The Guest	Choi Min-sang	
2019	Watcher	Jae Shik's friend	
2019	Hell Is Other People	Hong Nam-bok	
2020	The Cursed	Chun Joo-bong	
2020	Hi Bye, Mama!	Ji Park-ryeong	
2020	Zombie Detective	Wang Wey	
2021	L.U.C.A.: The Beginning	Kim Hwang-sik	
2021	Mine	Kim Seong-Tae	
2022	Twenty-Five Twenty-One	Na Hee-do's Fencing Club Coach at old high school	
2022	A Year-End Medley: Extended Version	Hotel Emros' executive director	
2022	The Good Detective 2	Jang Ki-jin	
2023	Strong Girl Nam-soon	Kim Nam-gil	
2023	Castaway Diva	Kang Sang-du / Lee Uk	
2024	A Killer Paradox	Kang Sang-Muk	
2024	No Gain No Love	Nam Gil	
2024	Pachinko Season 2	Korean Association's leader	
2024	The Auditors	Park Jae-hwa	
2024	The Pork Cutlets	Deok Sam	
2024	The Judge from Hell	Jae-hyun	
2025	Second Shot at Love	Ki-beom's father	
2025	Tastefully Yours	Butcher store owner	

=== Web series ===
Year	Title	Role	Notes	Ref.
2022	Unicorn	Kwak Seong-beom		
2022–2023	The Glory	Tae-wook	Part 1–2	
2023	Bloodhounds	Drunkard		

=== Television shows ===
Year	Title	Role	Notes	Ref.
2022	Accapella	Cast member		

== Awards and nominations ==
Name of the award ceremony, year presented, category, nominee of the award, and the result of the nomination
Award ceremony	Year	Category	Result	Nominee / Work	Ref.
25th Daegu Drama Festival	2008	Best Actor	Won	Lee Joong-ok	
27th KBS Entertainment	2020	Best Challenge Award	Won	Zombie Detective	
10th Wildflower Film Awards	2023	Best Actor	Won	Paroho	
