= Park Jin-joo =

South Korean actress (born 1988)

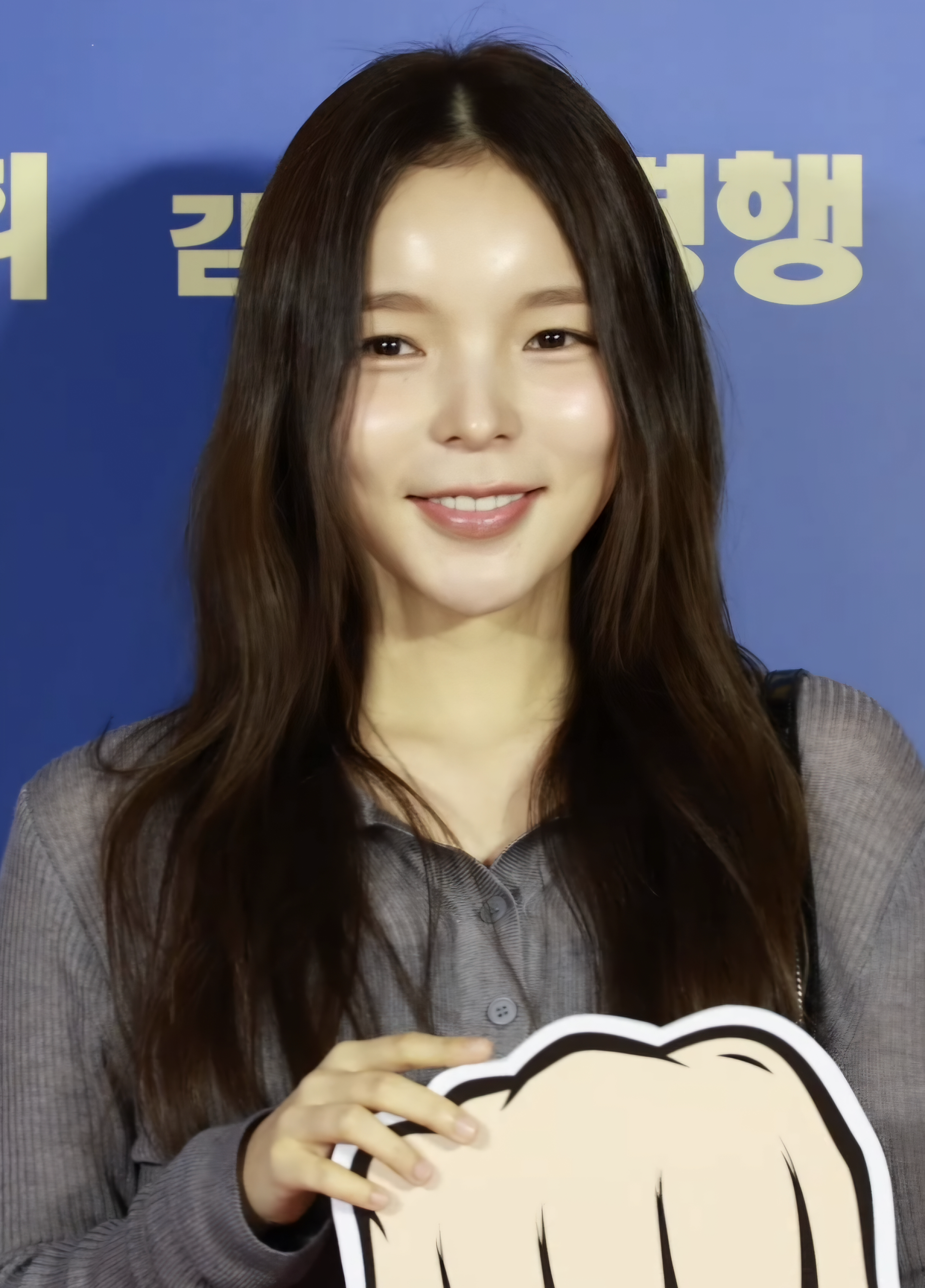
- Park in April 2024
- Born: December 24, 1988 (age 37); Gwangju, South Korea
- Education: Seoul Institute of the Arts
- Occupation: Actress
- Years active: 2011–present
- Agent: Prain TPC
- Spouse: Unknown (m. 2025)

Korean name
- Hangul: 박진주
- RR: Bak Jinju
- MR: Pak Chinju

Park Jin-joo (Korean: 박진주; born December 24, 1988) is a South Korean actress. She starred in television series such as Don't Dare to Dream (2016) and Something About 1% (2016), Encounter (2018–19), and Our Beloved Summer (2021).

== Personal life ==
On October 20, 2025, it was announced that Park would be marrying a non-celebrity. Park married on November 30, 2025.

== Filmography ==
=== Film ===
Year	Title	Role	Notes	Ref.
2011	Sunny	Hwang Jin-hee in 1980s		
2012	The Sleepless	Park In-jeong		
2013	Koala	Han Woo-ri		
2014	The Plan Man	Eun-ha		
2015	My Sister, the Pig Lady	Mi-ja		
2017	Uhm Bok-dong	Bong-seon		
2018	Swing Kids	Linda		
2018	Sovereign Default	Kang Yun-ju		
2018	The Princess and the Matchmaker	Ok-hee	Cameo	
2019	Race to Freedom: Um Bok Dong	Um Bong-seon		
2019	The Divine Fury	Chinese restaurant delivery woman	Cameo	
2022	Honest Candidate 2	Bong Man-soon	Special appearance	
2022	Hero	Ma Jin-joo		
2023	My Heart Puppy	Mi-seon		
2026	Okay! Madam 2	Seon-ah		

=== Television series ===
Year	Title	Role	Notes	Ref.
2011–2012	High Kick: Revenge of the Short Legged	Hong Bo-hee		
2012	Operation Proposal	Jo Jin-joo		
2013	Flower of Revenge	Park Nam-hee		
2013	KBS Drama Special: "The Memory in My Old Wallet"	Soo-A's friend		
2013	Waiting for Love	Seo Do-kyung		
2013–2014	Ruby Ring	Go So-young		
2014	Bride of the Century	Oh Jin-joo		
2014	Her Lovely Heels	Lee Soo-young		
2014	Wife Scandal: "The Wind Blows"			
2014	Angel Eyes	Kim Yoon-jeong		
2014	Only Love	Saet-byul's friend	Cameo	
2014	Modern Farmer	Han Sang-eun		
2015	The Family is Coming	Park Jin-joo	Cameo	
2015	A Girl Who Sees Smells	Ma Ae-ri		
2015	My Unfortunate Boyfriend	Mal-sook		
2015	Yumi's Room	Heo Se-ji		
2015	My Fantastic Funeral	Na-rae		
2016	Webtoon Hero Toondra Show: "The Texts of the Joseon Dynasty"	Hwang Deok-jeong (15 years old)	Season 2	
2016	The Vampire Detective	Radio staffer	Cameo (episode 2)	
2016	Don't Dare to Dream	Nurse Oh Jin-joo		
2016	Something About 1%	Han Yoo-kyung		
2016	The Legend of the Blue Sea	Nurse	Cameo (episode 5)	
2016–2017	The Gentlemen of Wolgyesu Tailor Shop	Coffee shop's staff	Cameo	
2017	Super Family 2017	Na Ik-hee's tutor		
2017	My Sassy Girl	Woman falling in love with Joon-young	Cameo (episode 32)	
2017	Reunited Worlds	Hong Jin-joo		
2017	While You Were Sleeping	Moon Hyang-mi		
2017	Two Cops	Nurse Song Kyung-mi		
2018	Encounter	Eun-jin		
2019	Her Private Life	Lee Seon-joo		
2019	Hotel del Luna	Gyeong Ah	Cameo (episode 8)	
2020	Backstreet Rookie	Gang Leader	Cameo (episode 1)	
2020	It's Okay to Not Be Okay	Yoo Seung-jae		
2021	Four Men	Park Hyun-soo		
2021–2022	Our Beloved Summer	Lee Sol-yi		
2022	If You Wish Upon Me	Se-hee	Cameo	
2023	My Dearest	Farmer	Cameo (episode 12)	
2023	Tell Me That You Love Me	Oh Ji-yu		
2025	When the Stars Gossip	Reporter	Cameo	

=== Web series ===
Year	Title	Role	Notes	Ref.
2015	Love Detective Sherlock K	Jin-joo		
2016	Spark	Yang Jin-soon		
2016	Dramaworld	Park Jin-joo	Cameo (episode 1)	
2016	Click Your Heart	Neoz High Teacher		
2020	Lovestruck in the City	Ra-Ra	Cameo (episode 1)	
2022	X of Crisis	Kim Dae-ri		

=== Television shows ===
Year	Title	Role	Notes	Ref.
2016	King of Mask Singer	Contestant	as "'Rain Is Falling From The Sky' Poncho Girl" (episodes 81–82); Panel (episodes 85–86)	
2022–2025	Hangout with Yoo	Cast member	as WSG Wannabe member	
2022–2025	Hangout with Yoo	Permanent cast member	Episode 150–283	

=== Radio shows ===
Year	Title	Role	Ref.
2022	This is Ahn Young-mi, the date muse at two o'clock	Special DJ	

== Stage ==
Year	Title		Role	Venue	Date	Ref.
Year	English	Korean	Role	Venue	Date	Ref.
2011	Briquet Road	연탄길		Yongsan Art Hall	April 22 – May 22	
2011	Briquet Road	연탄길		Busan Civic Centre Grand Theatre	June 18–19	
2012–2013	Rude Miss Young-ae	막돼먹은 영애씨	Tae-hee	KT&G Sangsang Madang Daechi Art Hall	November 20 – January 13	
2013	Rude Miss Young-ae	막돼먹은 영애씨	Tae-hee	Seosan Cultural Center Grand Performance Hall	March 28–29	
2013	Rude Miss Young-ae	막돼먹은 영애씨	Tae-hee	CGV Shinhan Card Art Hall (formerly CGV Pop Art Hall)	June 6 – July 14	
2023	Red Book	레드북	Anna	Hongik University Daehakro Art Center Grand Theater	March 14 – May 28	
2023	Red Book	레드북	Anna	Dream Theater	July 14–15	
2023	Red Book	레드북	Anna	Goyang Eoullim Nuri Oullim Theatre	August 5–6	
2024	Maybe Happy Ending	어쩌면 해피엔딩	Claire	Yes24 Stage 1 in Daehakro, Seoul	June 18 – September 8	
2024–2025	Ghost Bakery	고스트 베이커리	Sun-hee	Doosan Art Center, Jongno District, Seoul	December 19 – February 23	

== Accolades ==
=== Awards and nominations ===
Name of the award ceremony, year presented, category, nominee of the award, and the result of the nomination
Award ceremony	Year	Category	Nominee / Work	Result	Ref.
Director's Cut Awards	2023	Best New Actress in Film	Hero	Nominated	
MBC Entertainment Awards	2022	Rookie Award in Variety Category – Female	Hangout with Yoo	Won	
SBS Drama Awards	2017	Best Supporting Actress	Reunited Worlds	Won	
SBS Drama Awards	2021	Excellence Award for an Actress in a Mini-Series Romance/Comedy Drama	Our Beloved Summer	Nominated	

=== Listicles ===
Name of publisher, year listed, name of listicle, and placement
Publisher	Year	Listicle	Placement	Ref.
Korean Film Council	2021	Korean Actors 200 (Note: Introduces 200 actors that best represent the present and future of Korean cinema to the people in the film industry all over the world.)	Included	
