= Bloodhounds (TV series) =

2023 South Korean television series

- Hangul: 사냥개들
- Lit.: Hounds
- RR: Sanyanggaedeul
- MR: Sanyangkaedŭl
- Genre: Action drama; Crime thriller
- Based on: Bloodhounds by Jeong Chan
- Written by: Jason Kim
- Directed by: Jason Kim
- Starring: Woo Do-hwan; Lee Sang-yi; Park Sung-woong; Huh Joon-ho; Rain
- Music by: Koo Ja-kwan
- Country of origin: South Korea
- Original language: Korean
- No. of seasons: 2
- No. of episodes: 15

Production
- Producer: Kwon Mi-kyung
- Running time: 49–75 minutes
- Production companies: Studio N; Seed Film; Seven O Six

Original release
- Network: Netflix
- Release: June 9, 2023 – April 3, 2026

Bloodhounds (Korean: 사냥개들) is a South Korean action crime thriller television series written and directed by Jason Kim, and starring Woo Do-hwan, Lee Sang-yi, Park Sung-woong and Huh Joon-ho. Based on the Naver Webtoon of the same name by Jeong Chan, the series follows the story of a young boxer who teams up with a delinquent and a moneylender to fight against a loan shark organization. The first season premiered on Netflix on June 9, 2023. A second season was confirmed to be in production and released on April 3, 2026.

== Plot ==
=== Season 1 ===
Kim Gun-woo, a promising young boxer, dreams of providing a better life for his single mother. However, his mother falls prey to Smile Capital, a ruthless loan shark organization led by Kim Myeong-gil. Desperate to save his mother from their clutches, Gun-woo reluctantly accepts help from Choi Tae-ho, a benevolent moneylender with his own complex history. Gun-woo crosses paths with Hong Woo-jin, a former marine and a troubled delinquent who also finds solace in boxing. Despite their vastly different backgrounds, they form an unlikely and powerful bond, driven by a shared desire for justice and a need to protect those they love. Together with Tae-ho, Gun-woo and Woo-jin embark on a dangerous mission to bring down Smile Capital. They delve into the murky underworld of debt collection, facing off against ruthless enforcers and navigating the moral gray areas of their chosen path. As they confront Myeong-gil and his formidable organization, Gun-woo and Woo-jin grapple with their own internal struggles. They confront their pasts, confront the harsh realities of the world, and ultimately discover the true meaning of friendship, loyalty, and the price of freedom.

=== Season 2 ===
Fresh from taking down the loan sharks, Gun-woo and Woo-jin gear up for another fight when a global syndicate running an illegal boxing league targets them and puts their loved ones at risk.

== Cast and characters ==
=== Main ===
- Woo Do-hwan as Kim Gun-woo

A sincere and considerate boxing prospect and a former Marine.

- Lee Sang-yi as Hong Woo-jin

Gun-woo's partner in action and a former Marine.

- Park Sung-woong as Kim Myeong-gil (season 1)

The CEO of Smile Capital, and a notorious illegal loan shark who reigns above the law.

- Huh Joon-ho as Choi Tae-ho (season 1)

Formerly a legend of the private loan industry, he provides loans with no interest to people who have no money for medical treatment.

- Rain as Im Baek-jeong (season 2)

A menacing boxer who fights for money and power above all else. He would stop at nothing to get Gun-woo into the illegal boxing league Iron Knuckle Fighting Championship (IKFC), which he set up.

=== Supporting ===
- Choi Si-won as Hong Min-beom

A third-generation Chaebol, and the eldest son of the Chairman of I'll Corporation. He has relatives who hold very high positions within the government. He is Gang-yong's younger cousin.

- Choi Young-joon as Min Gang-yong

The leader of the Serious Crime Investigation Division of the National Investigation Headquarters, and Min-beom's older cousin.

- Park Ye-ni as Kang Tae-young

The leader of the Cyber Crimes Investigation Division.

- Park Hoon as Moon Kwang-moo

A private loan shark who formerly worked under Tae-ho, and a former Marine.

- Yoon Yoo-sun as Yoon So-yeon

Gun-woo's mother.

- Tae Won-seok as Kang In-beom

Myeong-gil's underling whom he met in prison.

Season 1

- Kim Sae-ron as Cha Hyun-joo

Tae-ho's successor and foster granddaughter.

- Lee Hae-yeong as Hwang Yang-jung

Tae-ho's right-hand man who runs a Japanese restaurant.

- Min Kyung-jin as Oh In-mook

Tae-ho's driver who was originally the security guard for Tae-ho's building.

- Cheon Dong-bin as Cheon Dong-woo
- Ha Soo-ho as Im Jang-do

The strategy management director of Smile Capital, who has connections with the police.

- Jo Wan-gi as Kim Jun-min

A sales manager of Smile Capital.

- Bae Jae-gi as Yang Jae-myeong

Myeong-gil's underling who pretends to be a homeless man in order to steal identification cards for loan purposes.

- Hong Jun-young as Captain Jung

A service representative of Smile Capital, and a former fighter.

- Park Min-jung as Madame Im

A business partner and Myeong-gil's lover.

- Jeong Da-eun as Oh Da-min

The granddaughter of In-mook, and an archer.

Season 2

- Hwang Chan-sung as Yun Tae-geom

A former 17th Special Forces sergeant specializing in explosives who was dishonorably discharged, currently working with Baek-jeong as an enforcer.

- Lee Si-eon as Lee Man-bae

A former NIS black ops agent currently working with Baek-jeong, specializing in operation planning, bribery and threatening. His real name is Lee Dong-hyeon.

- Lee Myeong-ro as Allen

An IT professional working with Baek-jeong, and the IKFC site operator.

- Kwak Seung-hyun as LOL

The host of the live streaming of the IKFC.

- Kang Min-ah as Gi-na

A casino dealer who communicates with Man-bae to distribute drugs.

- Cha Ji-hyeok as Lee Woo-jeong

A detective of the Serious Crime Investigation Division of the National Investigation Headquarters, and Gang-yong's junior.

- Hwang Dae-ki as Sun-bo

Kwang-moo's assistant.

=== Special appearances ===
Season 1

- Lee Joong-ok as a drunkard
- Ryu Soo-young as Lee Doo-young

Tae-ho's left arm who is loyal to him.

- Lim Hwa-young as Min-ji

Doo-young's wife.

- Kim Min-jae as Kim Jae-min (ep. 8)

A corrupt officer of the Serious Crime Investigation Division Unit 1, and a junior of Gang-yong.

Season 2

- Gong Myung as Dong-hyun (ep. 1)

Gun-woo's fan, and a taekwondo practitioner.

- Ryu Kyung-soo as Choi Kyung-won (ep. 2–3)

A detective of the Incheon Seo-gu Police Station.

- Ha Young as Nurse Yoon (ep. 3)
- Choi Kwang-il as Director Kang (ep. 5)

The director of the NIS, and Min-beom's uncle.

- Ryu Soo-young as Lee Doo-young (ep. 6–7)
- Park Seo-joon as Choi Sin-hyeong / Premium (ep. 6–7)

A NIS black ops agent.

- Kim Jin-young as Han Seul-gi (ep. 6–7)

A newly joined NIS black ops agent working with Premium.

- Kang Shin-il as Heo Chung-ho (ep. 7)

The chief of Gunsan Gymnasium, and the former boxing mentor of Baek-jeong.

- Jo Hyun-jae as Myung-hwan (ep. 7)

Gang-yong and Woo-jeong's senior.

- Park Sung-geun as Jeong Hee-jae (ep. 7)

The director of the Investigation Bureau of the National Investigation Headquarters.

- Lee Seol as An Ye-seo (ep. 7)

A NIS agent specializing in make-up and disguise.

- Lee Hyun-wook as Kang Hae-gwan (ep. 7)

A staff sergeant of the 17th Special Forces.

== Production ==
=== Season 1 ===
Actress Kim Sae-ron played the role of Cha Hyun-joo. On June 2, 2022, Netflix Korea announced Kim would be removed from the series following a DUI incident.

=== Season 2 ===
On January 16, 2025, Netflix Korea confirmed the production of the series' second season with Woo Do-hwan and Lee Sang-yi reprising their respective roles. In addition, Rain joined the cast to play a villain role, a first in his 20-year acting career.

== Reception ==
On the review aggregator website Rotten Tomatoes, 89% of 9 critics' reviews are positive, with an average rating of 7.6/10.

== Accolades ==
=== Awards and nominations ===
| Award ceremony | Year | Category | Nominee / Work | Result | Ref. |
|---|---|---|---|---|---|
| Korea Drama Awards | 2023 | Excellence Award, Actor | Lee Sang-yi | Won | |

=== Listicle ===
| Publisher | Year | Listicle | Placement | Ref. |
|---|---|---|---|---|
| Time | 2023 | The 10 Best Korean Dramas of 2023 on Netflix | Included | |
