= Dear X (TV series) =

2025 South Korean television series

- Promotional poster
- Hangul: 친애하는 X
- RR: Chinaehaneun X
- MR: Ch'inaehanŭn X
- Genre: Melodrama; Thriller
- Based on: Dear X by Vanziun
- Developed by: Studio Dragon
- Written by: Choi Ja-won
- Directed by: Lee Eung-bok; Park So-hyun
- Starring: Kim You-jung; Kim Young-dae; Kim Do-hoon; Lee Yul-eum
- Music by: Gaemi
- Country of origin: South Korea
- Original language: Korean
- No. of episodes: 12

Production
- Executive producers: Kim Ryun-hee (C.P.); Jang Kyung-ik; Yoo Sang-won; Baek Hyun-ki
- Producers: Ji Yong-ho; Lee Ji-min; Park Sol-bin
- Cinematography: Kim Woo-seung
- Editor: Oh Joo-ri
- Running time: 60 to 70 minutes
- Production companies: Monster Union; Siwoo Company

Original release
- Network: TVING
- Release: November 6 – December 4, 2025

Dear X (Korean: 친애하는 X) is a 2025 South Korean melo-thriller television series co-written by Choi Ja-won and Vanziun, directed by Lee Eung-bok and Park So-hyun, and starring Kim You-jung, Kim Young-dae, Kim Do-hoon and Lee Yul-eum. Based on the Naver Webtoon of the same title by Vanziun, it depicts the rise and downfall of top actress Baek Ah-jin and her two faces hidden behind it. The series first premiered in the On Screen section of the 30th Busan International Film Festival on September 18, 2025, where two of its twelve episodes were screened. It then premiered on TVING with the release of its first four episodes on November 6, 2025, at 18:00 (KST), followed by two new episodes every Thursday, for a total of 12 episodes. It is also available for streaming on HBO Max and Viki in selected regions, on Disney+ in Japan, and on STARZPlay in the MENA region.

== Synopsis ==
Growing up, Baek Ah-jin faced abuse and neglect. Early on, she learned how to mask her feelings and pull the strings for her benefit. That was how she could survive and later make her ambition a path to success. As she grew older, she turned herself into an up-and-coming actress whose beauty, talent, and charm cloaked a merciless drive for fame and power. By her side since childhood was Yoon Jun-seo. He loved and protected her unconditionally and believed his devotion could save her. As Ah-jin's actions turned darker over time, Jun-seo began to question whether he had been helping or enabling her. Another person molded by a tragic past was Kim Jae-oh, who became close with Ah-jin. He played the role of being her shadow to support and protect her while being deeply involved in her moral struggles. She rose to the top in her career amid opposition from Im Re-na, a rival actress and former idol. Re-na's presence and interest in Jun-seo developed tension and rivalry, complicating the relationships between Ah-jin, Jun-seo, and Jae-oh. As Ah-jin navigated the world of entertainment, power, and betrayal, her manipulations created a web of secrets and shifting loyalties. Those who loved or trusted her, including Jun-seo and Jae-oh, became caught in the chaos.

== Cast and characters ==
=== Main ===
- Kim You-jung as Baek Ah-jin
  - Ki So-yu as young Baek Ah-jin

A top South Korean actress who suffers from antisocial personality disorder, she's a sociopath who hides her cruel nature behind her beautiful face and wears a mask to survive. Abused and abandoned when she was a child, it had made her a master manipulator, using her charm and intelligence. During her school days, she mostly used Yoon Jun-seo and Kim Jae-oh to support and protect her to get ahead. She harbors a lot of grudges behind her somewhat good-natured demeanor. She climbs the ladder of success step by step, treading on childhood traumas, but everything begins to crumble the moment she reaches the top.

- Kim Young-dae as Yoon Jun-seo
  - Park Hoo as young Yoon Jun-seo

Ah-jin's childhood friend. After witnessing what his mom did to her when she was little, he felt bad and wanted to make it right. He thought love was the answer and was willing to do anything for her.

- Kim Do-hoon as Kim Jae-oh

A man who becomes Ah-jin's shadow, driven by a deep connection rooted in their shared trauma, and is fiercely devoted to protecting her at all costs.

- Lee Yul-eum as Im Re-na

She's an idol-turned-actress and Ah-jin's rival.

=== Supporting ===
- Kim Yi-kyung as Shim Sung-hee

Ah-jin's rival. She's jealous and resentful of Ah-jin due to her insecurities. She harbors a grudge against Ah-jin, who had her accused of stealing, and her status as a rich daughter no longer stands.

- Bae Soo-bin as Baek Seon-gyu

Ah-jin's heartless father, who abandoned her when she was young due to greed, and returned only to abuse her and take away her finances.

- Kim Yoo-mi as Hwang Ji-seon

Jun-seo's mother. She is Ah-jin's cruel ex-stepmother.

- Kim Ji-young as Seo Mi-ri

The CEO of Longstar Entertainment who turns Baek Ah-jin into a star.

- Hyun Seo-ha as Seok Hyang-i

Ah-jin's manager.

- Shin Moon-sung as Park Dae-ho

A detective who's in charge of the Baek Seon-gyu murder case.

=== Special appearances ===
- Hwang In-youp as Heo In-gang

An idol-turned-actor with a secret. He is Ah-jin's boyfriend for a year.

- Kim Ji-hoon as Choi Jeong-ho

Ex-baseball pro turned cafe owner. He's Ah-jin's boss at the cafe where she works part-time. He tried to protect Ah-jin from a stalker but mistakenly attacked her father, who is actually physically abusing her for money, and got involved in a murder case.

- Hong Jong-hyun as Moon Do-hyeok

Ah-jin's husband, the heir to a powerful conglomerate family, has been secretly watching her for a long time. He's the one who reached out to her and arranged the contract offer from her new agency. With a past wrapped in mystery, including a previous marriage that ended in divorce, he's a man with a hidden side.

- Park Seung-tae as Hong Kyung-sook

In-gang's grandmother.

- Ryu Kyung-hwan as Im Hee-gook.

Ah-jin's entertainment reporter.

== Production ==
=== Development ===
Dear X was co-directed by Lee Eung-bok and Park So-hyun and written by Choi Ja-won, who won the grand prize at the 2018 KBS One-Act Drama Script Contest. The series is based on a popular Naver Webtoon of the same title by Vanziun, who also co-wrote the screenplay with Choi. It is planned by Studio Dragon, produced by Monster Union and Siwoo Company, and primarily distributed by TVING. The series was a recipient of the OTT-Specific Content Production Support in 2024, a program owned and operated by the Korea Creative Content Agency (KOCCA) to support domestic streaming services and production companies.

=== Casting ===
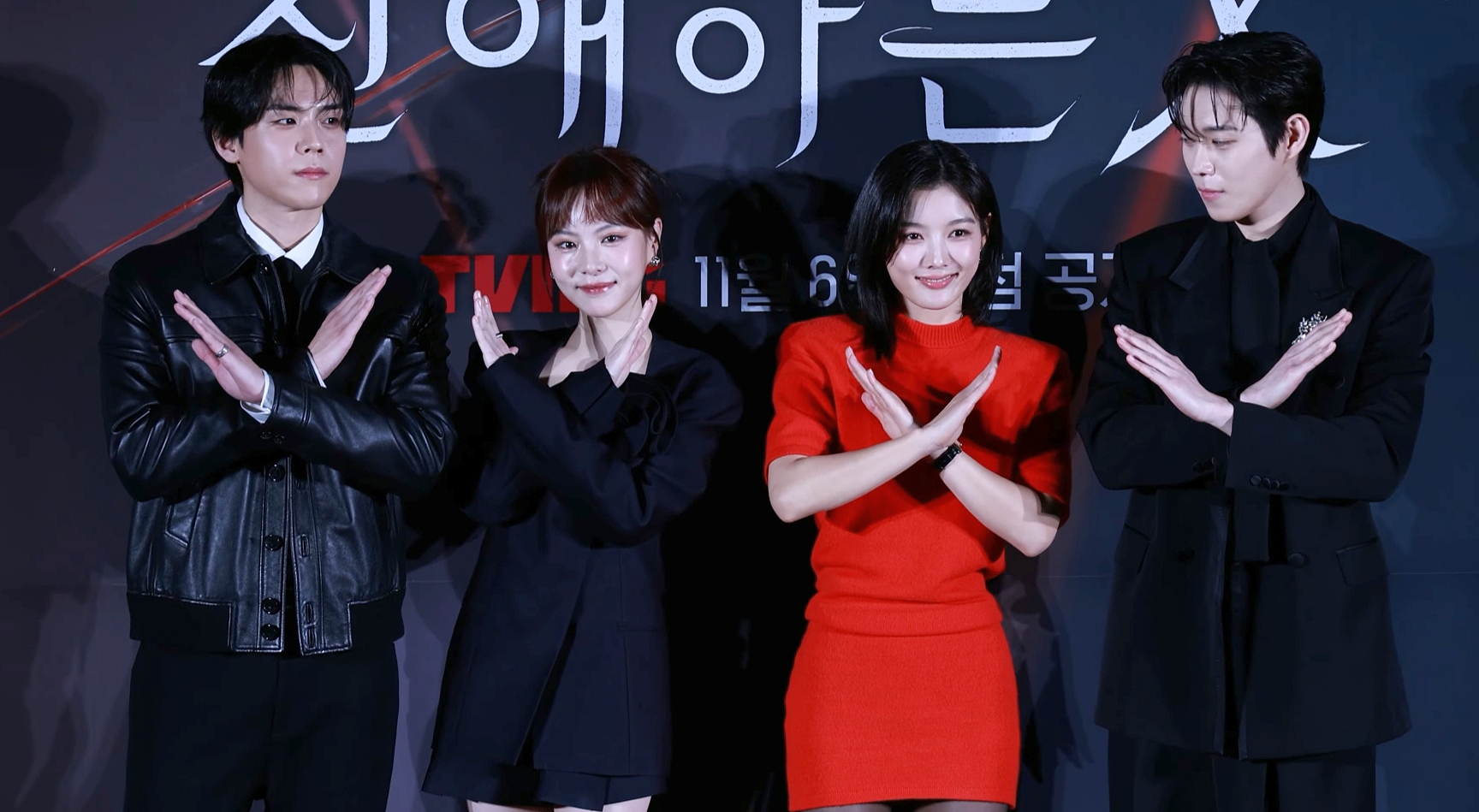
The main cast of Dear X from left to right: Kim Do-hoon, Lee Yul-eum, Kim You-jung, and Kim Young-dae.

On June 4, 2024, Kim You-jung was reportedly offered the role of sociopathic actress Baek Ah-jin and was considering it. A day later, Kim Young-dae was also considering joining. According to OSEN, both actors were confirmed to star together. On June 25, Kim Do-hoon received an offer and was in talks to join the series. The next day, Hwang In-youp was confirmed for a special appearance after receiving an offer. On August 8, TVING officially confirmed the casting of Kim Yoo-jung, Kim Young-dae, Kim Do-hoon and Lee Yul-eum.

== Original soundtrack ==
The OST singer lineup, which includes Lim Kim, Elaine Kim, Minnie, Sam Ock, Cocona, and Olivia Marsh, was unveiled on November 4, 2025. The music director of the series is Gaemi. The soundtrack album was released on December 8, 2025, containing all of the singles and background tracks from the series.

Dear. X (Original Soundtrack)

Soundtrack album by Various artists
- Released: December 8, 2025
- Language: Korean
- Label: Most Contents

Singles from Dear X
- 1. "Run & Run" Released: October 12, 2025; 2. "Insane" Released: October 19, 2025; 3. "Insane (Soft. ver)" Released: October 26, 2025; 4. "Devil's Angel" Released: November 2, 2025; 5. "Goodnye" Released: November 9, 2025; 6. "Ego" Released: November 16, 2025

=== Singles ===
Singles included on the album were released from November 6 to December 4, 2025.

Original soundtrack (Part 1–6)

=== Part 1 ===
All lyrics are written by Ssuvy; all music is composed by Gaemi and Soo-kyung.

Released on November 6, 2025
No.	Title	Artist	Length
1.	"Run & Run"	Lim Kim	2:54
2.	"Run & Run" (Inst.)		2:54
Total length:			5:48

=== Part 2 ===
All lyrics are written by Ssuvy; all music is composed by Gaemi and Soo-kyung.

Released on November 13, 2025
No.	Title	Artist	Length
1.	"Insane"	Elaine Kim	3:24
2.	"Insane" (Soft version)	Elaine Kim	1:40
3.	"Insane" (Inst.)		3:24
4.	"Insane" (Soft version; Inst.)		1:40
Total length:			10:08

=== Part 3 ===
All lyrics are written by Ssuvy; all music is composed by Gaemi and Soo-kyung.

Released on November 20, 2025
No.	Title	Artist	Length
1.	"Devil's Angel"	Minnie	2:48
2.	"Devil's Angel" (Inst.)		2:48
Total length:			5:36

=== Part 4 ===
All lyrics are written by Sam Ock; all music is composed by Gaemi and Soo-kyung.

Released on November 21, 2025
No.	Title	Artist	Length
1.	"Goodbye"	Sam Ock	4:26
2.	"Goodbye" (Inst.)		4:26
Total length:			8:52

=== Part 5 ===
All tracks are written by Huze, Viz, and Miyoku.

Released on November 27, 2025
No.	Title	Artist	Length
1.	"Ego"	Cocona	3:24
2.	"Ego" (Inst.)		3:24
Total length:			6:48

=== Part 6 ===
All lyrics are written by Ssuvy; all music is composed by Gaemi and Soo-kyung.

Released on December 4, 2025
No.	Title	Artist	Length
1.	"Eyes on Me"	Olivia Marsh	3:00
2.	"Eyes on Me" (Inst.)		3:00
Total length:			6:00

== Release ==
Dear X premiered on TVING on November 6, 2025, at 18:00 (KST). The first four episodes were released on November 6, followed by two new episodes every Thursday, for a total of 12 episodes. It is also available on HBO Max in selected regions. It became available in select Asian cable channels through tvN Asia on January 29, 2026, every Thursday and Friday.

On June 6, 2026, it premiered on linear television on tvN in South Korea airing at 22:30 (KST) every Saturday and Sunday.

Dear X was invited as one of six drama series in the On Screen section of the 30th Busan International Film Festival, where two of its twelve episodes were screened on September 18, 2025. On September 23 and 24, 2026, the Korean Cultural Institute in Rome held public screenings of the first episode, followed by a talk show with directors Lee Eung-bok and Park So-hyun. On October 16, 2026, the series was screened at the Garden Cinema in London as the closing event of Curated Korea 2026, a program organized by CJ ENM, the Korean Cultural Centre UK and KOCCA, followed by a Q&A with CJ ENM's head of European content sales.

== Reception ==
=== Critical response ===
Kim You-jung plays Baek Ah-jin in Dear X

Dear X received widespread acclaim from critics and was frequently described as a "prestige psychological thriller". Following its film festival screening, the South China Morning Post (SCMP) described the series as a high-energy "wicked melodrama noir". It reimagined the original webtoon's characters with a bolder narrative, leading to a more intense plot. Drama Critic Yun Suk-jin, in an article for The Korea Times wrote that Dear X "depicts the brutality of domestic violence with almost cinematic realism", further stating that by the fourth episode, it was clear that it depicted how monsters were made.

The performance of Kim You-jung was singled out as the series' defining feature, as well as her "career best performance". The Chosun Ilbo lauded her "masterful pacing between emotional outbursts and restraint", noting that her nuanced portrayal, together with how she revealed the character's pain and emptiness through a lack of emotion, significantly elevated the drama's overall quality. Pop Culture Critic Jeong Deok-hyeon, who also serves as judge for Baeksang Art Awards and the Republic of Korea Art Awards, described her performance as breaking away from her "Nation's Little Sister" image, transforming into "a villain who evokes both pity and horror". Times Now India also named her as one of the Top Ten Korean Performers in a Drama for 2025.

Director Lee Eung-bok was also lauded for his cinematic approach, where the use of a muted palette elevated the dark atmospheric tone of the series.

=== Viewership ===
The series was a massive commercial success for TVING. Domestically, it served as a cornerstone for TVING's domestic growth in late 2025. Upon its release, the series ranked number one in new paid membership contributions for five consecutive weeks. It set new records for total viewing time and the number of completions among all TVING original series, with the platform labeling it its "top blockbuster" of the year. The series also consistently ranked in the top three of the TV-OTT integrated drama buzz rankings during its run, with Kim You-jung reaching the number one spot for actor popularity in November 2025.

Internationally, the series became a global hit through distribution partnerships with HBO Max, Disney+, and Rakuten Viki:

- Global Reach: The series topped viewership charts in 108 countries, including the United States, United Kingdom, Brazil, Mexico, and India.
- Regional Performance: It ranked first on Disney+ in Japan and was selected as one of the top-performing Asian titles on HBO Max in the Asia-Pacific region, recording its highest viewership in the Philippines and Thailand.
- Milestone: It was the first CJ ENM title to be released with simultaneous Arabic subtitles on STARZPlay, where it reached the top five in the UAE and Saudi Arabia.

On June 6, 2026, the series premiered on tvN and aired every Saturday and Sunday at 22:30 (KST).

Dear X : South Korea viewers per episode (thousands)

Season	Episode number												Average
Season	1	2	3	4	5	6	7	8	9	10	11	12	Average
1	510	388	303	N/A	N/A	265	N/A	N/A	N/A	N/A	N/A	N/A	N/A

Source: Audience measurement performed nationwide by Nielsen Korea.

Average TV viewership ratings
Ep.	Original broadcast date	Average audience share (Nielsen Korea)	
Ep.	Original broadcast date	Nationwide	Seoul
1	June 6, 2026	2.063% (5th)	1.574% (7th)
2	June 7, 2026	1.476% (5th)	1.286% (8th)
3	June 13, 2026	1.384% (9th)	—N/a
4	June 14, 2026	1.0% (22nd)	—N/a
5	June 20, 2026	1.0% (22nd)	—N/a
6	June 21, 2026	1.1% (13th)	1.195% (5th)
7	June 27, 2026	0.9% (33rd)	—N/a
8	June 28, 2026	1.0% (31st)	—N/a
9	July 4, 2026	0.8% (32nd)	—N/a
10	July 5, 2026	1.0% (27th)	—N/a
11	July 11, 2026	1.3%	1.132% (10th)
12	July 12, 2026	1.0%	1.169% (10th)
Average		1.168%	—
In the table above, the blue numbers represent the lowest ratings and the red numbers represent the highest ratings.; This drama airs on a cable channel/pay TV which normally has a relatively smaller audience compared to free-to-air TV/public broadcasters (KBS, SBS, MBC, and EBS).

=== Impact ===
Dear X served as a pivotal case study for CJ ENM's "Brand Hall" strategy. The series was a flagship title in the multi-year partnership between CJ ENM and Warner Bros. Discovery which established a branded TVING hub on HBO Max, and also on Disney+ in Japan. This model improved profitability beyond content partnerships as it enabled the sale of older titles as packaged content together with the series.

This "Brand Hall" strategy with Dear X as pilot has been widely discussed as a breakthrough in the South Korean content production market. Instead of reliance on single-platform release, local production companies and domestic streaming platforms could expand overseas through multiple platform agreements while also maintaining ownership of IP Content. In its Year End review, the Korea Creative Content Agency (KOCCA) recognized the "Brand Hall" model used in distributing the series as a benchmark for a global distribution model that could restore balance to the South Korea content ecosystem.

Financially, the series contributed to a significant turnaround for CJ ENM: Q4 2025 operating profit more than doubled year-over-year driven by the success of global content, and the advertising revenue generated by TVING through its hit originals Dear X and Transit Love 4.

=== International Recognition ===
Dear X was included in the 2026 Overseas Korean Wave Survey (해외한류실태조사), an annual study commissioned by South Korea's Ministry of Culture, Sports and Tourism. The series ranked fifth among the most preferred Korean dramas globally, based on responses from 27,400 Korean cultural content consumers across 30 countries, making it the only TVING original to appear in the survey's top five.

Throughout 2026, the series was presented at several international content markets and industry forums. CJ ENM included it in its 2026 slate for the Latin American market and listed it in its catalogue for MIP London in February. In March, it was featured in a showcase of Korean series hosted by the Korea Creative Content Agency (KOCCA) at the Series Mania Forum in Lille, where South Korea was the inaugural Country of Honor. At the 20th Busan Content Market, CJ ENM presented the series' global rollout as a case study during the BCM Academy program. In October, it was among the titles presented in the KOCCA-organized panel "Code Korea: Korea's OTT Original Showcase" at the 12th MIA International Audiovisual Market in Rome. In November, Dear X was officially selected for the TV Beats Screenings program at TV Beats 2026, part of Industry@Tallinn & Baltic Event held alongside the Tallinn Black Nights Film Festival. It was the only Korean and Asian title among the 27 drama projects chosen by TV Beats that year, and one of seven series selected for the screenings program.

== Accolades ==
=== Awards and nominations ===
Award Ceremony	Year	Category	Recipient(s)	Result	Ref.
Asian Academy Creative Awards	2026	Best Direction (Scripted) National Winner - Korea	Lee Eung-bok	Won	
Asia Artist Awards	2025	Best Artist — Actress	Kim You-jung	Won	
Asia Star Entertainer Awards (ASEA)	2026	Best Artist — Actress	Kim You-jung	Nominated	
Asian Television Awards	2026	Best Drama Series (OTT)	Dear X	Won	
Brand Consumer Loyalty Awards	2026	Best Actress (Hot Trend)	Kim You-jung	Nominated	
ContentAsia Awards	2026	Silver, Best Female Lead in a TV Programme/Series Made in Asia	Kim You-jung	Silver	
ContentAsia Awards	2026	Best Drama Series Made in Asia for a Regional or International Market	Dear X	Nominated	
ContentAsia Awards	2026	Viewers' Choice: Favourite TV Series	Dear X	Nominated	
Director's Cut Awards	2026	Best Actress (Drama)	Kim You-jung	Nominated	
FUNdex Awards	2026	Best Actress of OTT Original Drama	Kim You-jung	Pending	
FUNdex Awards	2026	Popular Star Prize - K-Drama Actress	Kim You-jung	Pending	
FUNdex Awards	2026	Best of Original OTT Drama	Dear X	Pending	
Global OTT Awards	2026	Best Lead Actress	Kim You-jung	Nominated	
Global OTT Awards	2026	People's Choice Award	Kim You-jung	Nominated	
K-Brand Index Star Awards	2026	Best Drama	Dear X	Won	
Korea Content Awards	2026	Broadcasting & Video Industry Development Merit	Lee Eung-bok	Pending	
Korea Drama Awards	2026	Best Drama	Dear X	Nominated	
Korea Drama Awards	2026	Global Star Award	Kim You-jung	Nominated	
Korea Drama Awards	2026	Hot Star Award (Female Category)	Kim You-jung	Nominated	
Seoul International Drama Awards	2026	Outstanding Asian Star: Korea Popularity Award (Female)	Kim You-jung	Nominated	

=== Listicles ===
Name of publisher, year listed, name of listicle, and placement
Publisher	Year	Listicle	Placement	Ref.
Collider	2025	10 Best K-Thrillers of 2025	7th	
Ministry of Culture, Sports and Tourism	2026	Most Preferred Korean Dramas of 2025	5th	
Rakuten Viki	2025	Top K-Dramas of 2025	Included	
South China Morning Post	2025	15 Best K-Dramas of 2025	11th	
Starzplay Arabia	2026	Best of 2025	Included	
The Telegraph	2025	Top 5 K-Dramas of 2025	5th	
The Korea Herald	2025	Best K-Dramas of 2025	Included	
Times Now India	2025	Top 10 K-Dramas of 2025	4th	
Times Now India	2025	Top 10 K-Drama Performers Of 2025 (Kim You-Jung)	Included	
TIME	2025	10 Best K-Dramas of 2025	Honorable Mention	
