= Circle of Atonement =

2015 South Korean drama film

- Theatrical release poster
- Hangul: 비밀
- Hanja: 秘密
- RR: Bimil
- MR: Pimil
- Directed by: Park Eun-gyoung; Lee Dong-ha
- Produced by: Jang So-jung; Lee Haeng-bok
- Starring: Sung Dong-il; Son Ho-jun; Kim You-jung
- Cinematography: Jeon Dae-sung
- Edited by: Sung Su-ah
- Music by: Choi In-yeong
- Production company: Film Dorothy
- Distributed by: CGV Arthouse
- Release date: 15 October 2015 (South Korea)
- Running time: 101 minutes
- Country: South Korea
- Language: Korean

Circle of Atonement (Korean: 비밀; RR: Bimil; lit. 'Secret') is a 2015 South Korean mystery drama film starring Sung Dong-il, Son Ho-jun and Kim You-jung, and directed by Park Eun-gyoung and Lee Dong-ha.

The film premiered at the Busan International Film Festival on 2 October 2015. It was released in theaters on 15 October 2015.

== Plot ==
Detective Lee Sang-won (Sung Dong-il) and his daughter, Lee Jung-hyun (Kim You-jung), meet high school teacher Nam Chul-woong (Son Ho-jun) and discover common ties to a tragic murder case that happened 10 years earlier.

== Cast ==
- Sung Dong-il as Detective Lee Sang-won
- Son Ho-jun as Nam Chul-woong
- Kim You-jung as Lee Jang-hyun
- Im Hyung-joon as Shin Ji-chul
- Seo Yea-ji as Kang Yoo-sin
- Lee Kyung-jin as Yoo-shin's mother
- Choi Yoo-ri as Shin Ki-jung
- Jin Kyung as Reporter Kim
