= The Divine Fury =

- Theatrical release poster
- Hangul: 사자
- Hanja: 使者
- Lit.: Emissary
- RR: Saja
- MR: Saja
- Directed by: Kim Joo-hwan
- Written by: Kim Joo-hwan
- Starring: Park Seo-joon; Ahn Sung-ki; Woo Do-hwan
- Music by: Koo Ja-wan
- Production companies: KeyEast; Studio 706
- Distributed by: Lotte Entertainment
- Release date: 31 July 2019
- Running time: 129 minutes
- Country: South Korea
- Language: Korean
- Budget: ₩14.7 billion
- Box office: US$11.8 million

The Divine Fury (Korean: 사자; RR: Saja; lit. 'emissary') is a 2019 South Korean action horror film written and directed by Kim Joo-hwan. It stars Park Seo-joon, Ahn Sung-ki and Woo Do-hwan. The film was released on July 31, 2019.

== Plot ==
The film tells the story of Yong-hoo (Park Seo-joon), a martial arts champion who gains divine powers to fight a powerful evil force. After a tragic childhood in which both of his parents died, Yong-hoo harbors deep resentment toward the Almighty. He channels his anger to become a successful MMA fighter. After a bout in the United States, he develops a stigmata, which forces him to seek the help of Father Ahn (Ahn Sung-ki). The priest, who is an exorcist, sees potential in Yong-hoo after his wound defeats a demon. The two partner up to battle demonic activity in Korea and run up against the disciple of evil, Ji-shin.

== Cast ==
- Park Seo-joon as Yong-hoo
  - Lee Chan-yoo as young Yong-hoo
- Ahn Sung-ki as Father Ahn
- Woo Do-hwan as Ji-shin
- Park Ji-hyun as Soo-jin
- Jung Ji-hoon as Ho-seok
- Lee Seung-hee as Possessed Man
- Sim Hee-seop as Father Kim
- Kim Si-eun as Nun Theresa
- Kim Seon-min as Angela
- Kim Bum-soo as Bum-soo
- Ryu Kyung-soo as Doctor
- Seo Jeong-yeon as Soo-jin's Mother
- Jo Eun-hyung as Hong-jin
- Jung Eui-soon as Veronica
- Kim Ye-ji as Past Apostle
- Choi Woo-shik as Father Choi
- Park Jin-joo as Chinese restaurant delivery woman
- Lee Seol as Seol

== Production ==
The film began production on August 14, 2018. It reunites director Jason Kim and actor Park Seo-joon, after Midnight Runners.

== Release ==
The film was released in cinemas in Australia and New Zealand on August 8, 2019, licensed by Purple Plan and distributed by Magnum Films, and in the United States and Canada on August 16, 2019, distributed by Well Go USA Entertainment.

== Reception ==
The film was released on 1405 screens on July 31, 2019. It opened at second place with 380,092 admissions. With a total production cost of ₩14.7 billion, it required at least 3 million (South Korean) admissions to cross the break-even point. The film was produced with a sequel in mind, but the successor is unclear due to the film's box office failure.

== Projected sequel ==
The closing credits ends with a teaser announcement, for a sequel film to be called "The Green Exorcist", that would follow Father Choi.
