= My Heart Puppy =

2022 South Korean film

- Theatrical release poster
- Hangul: 멍뭉이
- RR: Meongmungi
- MR: Mŏngmungi
- Directed by: Jason Kim
- Screenplay by: Jason Kim
- Starring: Yoo Yeon-seok; Cha Tae-hyun
- Cinematography: Kim Yong-seong
- Edited by: Kim Sun-min
- Music by: Koo Ja-wan
- Production companies: Yworks Entertainment; Don Quixote Entertainment; 7OSIX
- Distributed by: Little Big Pictures; Kidari Studio
- Release dates: October 31, 2022 (Seoul Animal Film Festival); March 1, 2023 (South Korea)
- Running time: 113 minutes
- Country: South Korea
- Language: Korean
- Budget: ₩3 billion
- Box office: US$1.3 million

My Heart Puppy (Korean: 멍뭉이) is a 2022 South Korean comedy-drama film directed by Jason Kim, starring Yoo Yeon-seok and Cha Tae-hyun. The film revolves around two men who are going to be separated from their family-like pet dog, and their journey to find a new owner. It was released theatrically on March 1, 2023.

== Synopsis ==
Min-soo (Yoo Yeon-seok) is an ordinary office worker who dreams of a perfect family. He has a dog, Rooney, whom he treats as a younger brother. Unexpected circumstances arise in Min-soo's life, when he can no longer live with Rooney ahead of his marriage with his fiancée who is allergic to dogs. Together with his cousin, Jin-guk (Cha Tae-hyun) who owns a cafe that went bankrupt, Min-soo decides to find a new family for Rooney. On their journey that starts in Seoul and continues to Jeju Island to find the perfect owner, the two encounter the heartbreaking reality of abandoned pets.

== Cast ==
- Yoo Yeon-seok as Min-soo
- Cha Tae-hyun as Jin-guk
- Jung In-sun as Seong-gyeong, Min-soo's girlfriend
- Kang Shin-il as Jin-guk's uncle
- Park Jin-joo as the first interviewee
- Woo Do-hwan as the husband of the first interviewee
- Tae Won-seok as the second interviewee
- Jung Ji-hoon as middle school student
- Kim Ji-young as director of the abandoned dog center
- Ryu Soo-young as a father
- Lee Ho-jung as girl on boat
- Kim You-jung as Ah-min

== Production ==
=== Development ===
Director-screenwriter Jason Kim wrote the story of the film based on his experience of separating from his dog, which he had been raising since childhood. Rooney, the name of the pet dog in the film, is also the name of his dog. Kim began writing the script of the film in 2018.

=== Casting and filming ===
Initially, in June 2019, Choi Woo-sik and Gong Myung were confirmed to star in the movie and the filming was expected to start in the second half of that year. But in August 2019, it was reported that production companies had decided to step down from the film and the production was put on hold. Later, Choi and Gong withdrew from the project.

In March 2020, Cha Tae-hyun was confirmed to appear in the film, Yoo Yeon-seok joined the film in May and filming began in June. The film reunited actors Cha and Yoo after their 2008 drama General Hospital 2.

Director Kim revealed that actors Cha and Yoo agreed to lower the amount they would normally get paid for appearing in the film, while Kim Yoo-jung, who makes a cameo appearance, stars in the film without pay.

== Release ==
The film was selected as the closing film of the 5th Seoul Animal Film Festival where it premiered on October 31, 2022. It was released on March 1, 2023, in theatres in South Korea.
