= Secret Door (TV series) =

2014 South Korean television series

- Genre: Historical; Drama; Political; Mystery
- Written by: Yoon Sun-joo
- Directed by: Kim Hyung-shik
- Starring: Han Suk-kyu; Lee Je-hoon; Kim Yoo-jung; Yoon So-hee; Park Eun-bin; Kim Min-jong; Choi Won-young
- Country of origin: South Korea
- Original language: Korean
- No. of episodes: 24

Production
- Executive producers: Choi Moon-suk; Gil Don-sup
- Producers: Lee Young-joon; Lee Sang-min
- Production location: Korea
- Running time: Mondays and Tuesdays at 22:00 (KST)
- Production company: Paulownia

Original release
- Network: Seoul Broadcasting System
- Release: 22 September – 9 December 2014

Secret Door (Korean: 비밀의 문; RR: Bimirui mun) is a 2014 South Korean television series starring Han Suk-kyu, Lee Je-hoon, Kim Yoo-jung, Park Eun-bin, Kim Min-jong, and Choi Won-young. It aired on SBS on Mondays and Tuesdays at 22:00 from 22 September to 9 December 2014 for 24 episodes.

== Plot ==
The period drama explores the conflicted and ultimately tragic relationship between King Yeongjo and his son, Yi Sun (Crown Prince Sado). Shrewd Yeongjo wants to strengthen royal power, but passionate and idealistic son dreams of equality and a status-free society.

== Cast ==
- Han Suk-kyu as King Yeongjo
- Lee Je-hoon as Yi Sun, later Crown Prince Sado; as Yi San, Son of Yi Sun, later King Jeongjo
- Kim Yoo-jung as Seo Ji-dam (episodes 1-13)
  - Yoon So-hee as adult Ji-dam / Park Bingae (episodes 14-24)
- Park Eun-bin as Lady Hyegyeong
- Kim Min-jong as Na Chul-joo
- Choi Won-young as Chae Je-gong
- Kim Chang-wan as Kim Taek
- Jang In-sub as Jang Dong-gi
- Lee Won-jong as Park Mun-su
- Kang Seo-joon as Min Woo-sub
- Seo Jun-young as Shin Heung-bok
- Choi Jae-hwan as Heo Jung-woon
- Kim Myung-gook as Hong Bong-han
- Jang Hyun-sung as Hong Gye-hui
- Kim Ha-kyun as Kim Sang-ro
- Um Hyo-sup as Min Baek-sang
- Jung Moon-sung as Byun Jong-in
- Jeon Gook-hwan as Lee Jong-sung
- Kim Seung-wook as Jo Jae-ho
- Baek Seung-hyeon as Shin Chi-woon
- Ha Seung-ri as Queen Jeongsun
- Lee Seol as Moon Suk-ui, Yeongjo's concubine
- Son Byong-ho as Kim Sung-ik
- Park Hyun-sook as Court lady Choi
- Kim Kang-hyun as Eunuch Jang
- Kim Mi-ran as Court lady Kim
- Kim Tae-hoon as Kang Pil-jae
- Lee Won-jae as Kang Seo-won
- Choi Won-hong as Uhm Jae-sun
- Park Hyo-joo as Woon-shim
- Kim Bo-ryung as Choon-wol
- Jung Wook as Heuk-pyo
- Yoon Choong as Jang Sam
- Ji Sang-hyuk as Lee Sa
- Park So-eun as Shin Go-eun
- Kwon Hae-hyo as Seo Gyun
- Jung Gyu-soo as Yang Soon-man
- Lee Mi-young as Court lady Min
- Kim Young-sun as Heung-bok's mother
- Kim Han-joon as Constable Choi
- Kim Hyun as Painter Jang
- Yoon Seo-hyun as Chun Seung-se
- Kwak Hee-sung as Kim Moo
- Go On as Lee Gyo
- Lee Won-keun as Kim Moon

== Historical background ==
Secret Door is a revisionist take on the last eight years of Crown Prince Sado's life.

According to historical documents, primarily those written by his wife in the Memoirs of Lady Hyegyeong, Sado was insane and violent, and was a serial rapist and killer. He was deemed unfit to rule, but court rules forbade Yeongjo from directly killing royalty. So Yeongjo issued a royal decree that ordered Sado to climb into and be sealed within a large wooden rice chest on a hot July day in 1762. After eight days, Sado died of suffocation and starvation at age 27. In the 19th century, conspiracy theories arose that Sado had not been mentally ill, but had pushed for revolutionary changes and thus his political opponents had framed him for crimes he did not commit. The circumstances surrounding his death continue to be an issue of debate among Korean historians.

Upon his ascension to the throne, Sado's son King Jeongjo memorialized and honored his father's tomb, and Sado and Hyegyeong were posthumously elevated in status and given the titles Emperor Yangjo and Empress Heonyeong.

== Awards and nominations ==
Year	Award	Category	Recipient	Result
2014	SBS Drama Awards	Top Excellence Award, Actor in a Serial Drama	Lee Je-hoon	Won
2014	SBS Drama Awards	Top Excellence Award, Actor in a Serial Drama	Han Suk-kyu	Nominated
2014	SBS Drama Awards	Special Award, Actor in a Serial Drama	Choi Won-young	Nominated
2014	SBS Drama Awards	Top 10 Stars	Lee Je-hoon	Won
2014	SBS Drama Awards	New Star Award	Kim Yoo-jung	Won
2014	SBS Drama Awards	Netizen Popularity Award	Lee Je-hoon	Nominated
2014	SBS Drama Awards	Best Couple Award	Lee Je-hoon and Park Eun-bin	Nominated
