= Jason Kim =

South Korean film director and screenwriter

- Born: Kim Ju-hwan; 1981 (age 44–45); Seoul, South Korea
- Education: Georgetown University
- Occupations: Film director, screenwriter

Korean name
- Hangul: 김주환
- RR: Gim Juhwan
- MR: Kim Chuhwan

Jason Kim (Korean: 김주환; born 1981), birth name Kim Ju-hwan (Korean: 김주환), is a South Korean film director and screenwriter.

== Career ==
Kim, born in 1981, majored in international politics from Georgetown University in the United States. He served for three years as an interpreter in the Republic of Korea Air Force before joining Showbox's promotion department and later the film investment department. He dreams of making his own films and has made in his spare time youth drama films Goodbye My Smile (2010) and Koala (2013). He later quit his job to pursue his career in filmmaking. He spent three years working on the script of his first mainstream film Midnight Runners (2017) which became a hit in South Korea and was also screened overseas.

== Filmography ==
- Goodbye My Smile (2010) - director
- Koala (2013) - director, screenwriter
- Retriever (short film, 2016) - director
- Midnight Runners (2017) - director, screenwriter
- The Divine Fury (2019) - director, screenwriter
- My Heart Puppy (2023) - director, screenwriter
- Bloodhounds (2023) - Netflix original series, director, screenwriter.
- Officer Black Belt (2024) - Netflix original film, director, screenwriter
