= The 8th Night =

2021 South Korean horror thriller film

- Official release poster
- Hangul: 제8일의 밤
- RR: Je8irui bam
- MR: Che8irŭi pam
- Directed by: Kim Tae-hyoung
- Screenplay by: Kim Tae-hyoung
- Produced by: Hyun Kwang Seo
- Starring: Lee Sung-min; Park Hae-joon; Kim You-jung; Nam Da-reum
- Cinematography: Choo Kyeong-yeob
- Edited by: Kim Sun-min
- Music by: Shim Hyun-jung
- Production companies: Gom Pictures; Gogo Studio
- Distributed by: Netflix; Little Big Pictures
- Release date: July 2, 2021
- Running time: 115 minutes
- Country: South Korea
- Language: Korean

The 8th Night (Korean: 제8일의 밤; RR: Je8irui bam) is a 2021 South Korean horror film directed by Kim Tae-hyoung for Gom Pictures starring Lee Sung-min, Park Hae-joon, Kim You-jung, and Nam Da-reum. The film depicts the struggle of a former exorcist attempting to stop the resurrection of two mysterious beings who tormented humans and were locked up in separate caskets for 2500 years. It was released on Netflix and made available for streaming in 190 countries on 2 July 2021.

== Plot ==
2,500 years ago, a monster crossed from hell into the human realm to create human suffering. Buddha ripped both its Red Eye and the Black Eye and sealed them in separate Śarīra caskets, which were buried in the Far East and Far West. In the present day, Professor Kim Joon-cheol discovers one of the caskets in the desert, but his findings are dismissed as fraudulent. Fourteen years later, Professor Kim, now a bitter individual, is determined to prove the truth of his discovery by reuniting the Black Eye and Red Eye. He opens the casket and pours six vials of blood into it from himself and members of his meditation group. The Red Eye emerges from the casket, presumably possessing him, beginning a chain of deaths among the group's members.

In Gwangju, Bhante Ha-jung, protector of the Black Eye casket, realizes the Red Eye has reawakened and tells the young Cheong-seok that it must be stopped before it reunites with the Black Eye. Ha-jung dies soon afterward, leaving Cheong-seok to find his former disciple, Bhante Seon Hwa. Meanwhile, in Chilgok, the Red Eye moves between human hosts, leaving victims whose bodies are shriveled and decomposed. Detectives Kim Ho-Tae and Dong-jin investigate the strange murders, eventually discovering their connection to Kim Joon-cheol's meditation group.

Cheong-seok finds Seon Hwa, who had abandoned the monastery after the deaths of his wife and daughter and refused to become Ha-jung's successor. The two set out to find the seventh "pillar," believed to be a Virgin Shaman who can prevent the Eyes from meeting. Their search leads them to a young woman named Ae-ran and a mysterious shaman. Seon Hwa believes Ae-ran is the seventh pillar and attempts to kill her, while Cheong-seok takes her away to protect her. Meanwhile, Detective Kim and Dong-jin uncover the connection between the meditation group, the victims, and the Virgin Shaman.

It is revealed that the woman Seon Hwa tried to kill is the real Virgin Shaman, while Ae-ran is the ghost of an abused girl whom Professor Kim once rescued. Kim had groomed Ae-ran to become a sacrifice and manipulated members of his meditation group into giving blood through supposedly free health tests. Ae-ran subsequently manipulated the Virgin Shaman and Dong-jin to further Kim's plan. The Red Eye ultimately possesses Dong-jin and heads to Gwangju, where Cheong-seok and Seon Hwa attempt to stop it.

Seon Hwa and Cheong-seok devise a plan to trap the Red Eye inside Dong-jin and kill him, but the Red Eye reveals that Cheong-seok himself is actually the seventh pillar. Because Seon Hwa never became Ha-jung's successor, the role passed to Cheong-seok, making him the only person capable of opening the casket containing the Black Eye. The Red Eye possesses Cheong-seok and pursues him, while Seon Hwa and Detective Kim try to intervene. The Red Eye uses Cheong-seok's appearance to torment Seon Hwa over his family's deaths, but Seon Hwa resists and manages to transfer the Red Eye into himself using a blood-drawn talisman.

Possessed by the Red Eye, Seon Hwa asks Cheong-seok to kill him before the Eye can reunite with the Black Eye. Cheong-seok kills Seon Hwa, preventing the two Eyes from being reunited. Later, Cheong-seok returns the Śarīra casket to the place where it was originally discovered. Ae-ran's spirit appears before him, and when Cheong-seok offers his hand, the chains binding her spirit fall away, finally freeing her.

== Cast ==
- Lee Sung-min as Park Jin-soo / Seon Hwa, the guardian
- Park Hae-joon as Kim Ho-tae, homicide detective
- Kim You-jung as Kim Ae-ran, a girl with a secret
- Nam Da-reum as Cheong-seok
- Kim Dong-young as Dong-jin
- Lee Eol as Ha-jeong
- Choi Jin-ho as Professor Kim Joon-cheol
- Kim Han-sol as delivery man
- Park Se-hyun as a high school girl

== Production ==
=== Casting ===
In May 2019, Lee Sung-min, Park Hae-joon, Kim You-jung, and Nam Da-reum were confirmed to appear in the film. Later, Lee Eul and Choi Jin-ho joined the cast.

=== Filming ===
Filming began on May 19, 2019, and was wrapped up on September 26, 2019. The film was shot in Suwon, Incheon, Paju, Daejeon, Daegu, Yeongyang County and Kazakhstan. It was set to release in 2020 but was postponed due to COVID-19.

== Reception ==
On the review aggregator website Rotten Tomatoes, 63% of 8 critics' reviews are positive, with an average rating of 5.60/10.

Sarah Musnicky, writing for Nightmarish Conjurings, rated it with 4.5/5 stars and wrote that the screenplay is 'incredibly thoughtful' as it kept the audience guessing. She opined, "The writing helps to elevate the story beyond a typical "save the day" scenario." Musnicky also praised the performances of the cast because in her opinion that really helped the development of characters. Praising the FX makeup and the VFX, she penned, "And its in that simplicity that I think the Makeup and VFX teams really shone." Concluding the review Musnicky expressed, "Altogether, The 8th Night is a strong contender for one of my favorite films of 2021."

Johnny Loftus of Decider praised Nam Da-reum's performance. He opined that The 8th Night, was a well-made film which eschews 'big scares' and 'jump scenes' for a 'suitably creepy' juxtaposition of the supernatural and mundane. Ending his write-up, he wrote, "A different film might fling the door to Hell open with a little more flair, but The 8th Night still drives at its central conceit with subtle notes of character and spirit world mystery."

For JumpCut Online, Nguyen Le said the film has "the style, the startles and the sight to certify deeper currents" despite an overly rapid pacing and average English subtitling work that can cause details to be lost. He ended his 3.5/5 review by saying this is a film "you should, at least once, give the time of day to."

Writing for Culture Mix, Carla Hay opined that The 8th Night has innovative cinematography and visual effects making the film an above average horror film. Hay wrote that the film with solid plot overcame decoration over content scenes, and suspenseful and surprising twists made up for the film's messy climax. Ending the review Hay said, "The 8th Night has enough captivating mystery and horror that viewers, confused or not, shouldn't get easily bored from watching this movie."
