= Jo Mi-ryung (actress, born 1973) =

South Korean actress

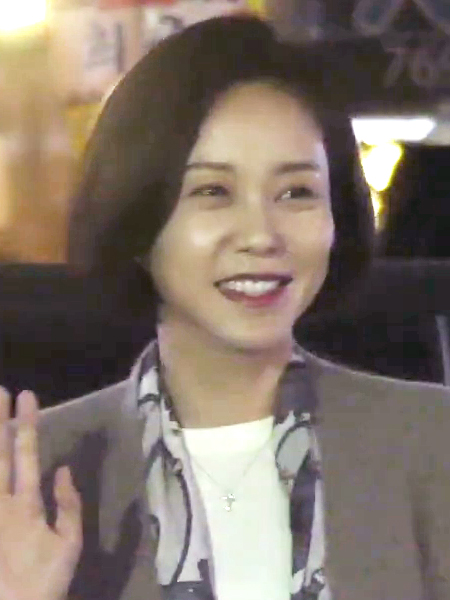
- Jo in 2019
- Born: April 16, 1973 (age 53); Seoul, South Korea
- Education: Seoul Institute of the Arts - Theater
- Occupation: Actress
- Years active: 1995–present
- Agent: Jump Entertainment

Korean name
- Hangul: 조미령
- Hanja: 趙美玲
- RR: Jo Miryeong
- MR: Cho Miryŏng

Jo Mi-ryung (born April 16, 1973) is a South Korean actress. She is best known as a supporting actress, in television dramas such as Dae Bak Family (2002), Passion (2004), I Love You (2008), The Slave Hunters (2010), and Can't Lose (2011).

== Filmography ==
=== Television series ===
Year	Title	Role	Notes/Ref.
1995	4th Republic	Jung In-sook	
1995	Sibling Relations	Park Mi-ryung	
1995	Sook-hee		
1996	Truth		
1996	Their Embrace		
1996	Illusionist		
1996	Homicide		
1997	Star in My Heart	Ahn Yi-hwa	
1998	My Love by My Side		
1998	Love	Maeng Yoo-mi	
1998	Run Barefoot		
1998	The Solid Man		
2001	Guardian Angel	Yeo Eun-joo	
2002	Dae Bak Family	Eldest daughter	
2004	Match Made in Heaven	Jo An-na	
2004	Between Agasshi and Ajumma	Eldest daughter-in-law	
2004	Passion	Choi Kang-ji	
2005	Three-Leaf Clover	Kim Sung-sil	
2005	Queen's Conditions	Nam Nan-joo	
2005	Single Again	Kang Hye-ran	
2005	Golden Apple	Jo Mi-ja	
2006	Dr. Kkang	Nurse Seo	
2006	Hearts of Nineteen	Na Pal-ja	
2006	Look Back with a Smile		
2006	Common Single	Jo Min-sook	
2007	Thank You	Park So-ran	
2007	Good Day to Love	Kim Myung-jin	
2008	I Love You	Na Jin-hee	
2009	Ja Myung Go	Mi-chu	
2009	Joseon Mystery Detective Jeong Yak-yong	Han Sung-ho's wife	Cameo (episode 1)
2010	The Slave Hunters	Keun Jumo	
2010	Golden House	Madam Hong	
2010	Life Is Beautiful	Yang Soo-ja	
2011	KBS Drama Special: "Men Cry"	Young-chae	
2011	Ojakgyo Family	Jung Yoon-sook	
2011	Can't Lose	Kim Young-joo	
2011	Lights and Shadows	Soon-ae	
2012	Dr. Jin	Silk merchant	Cameo
2012	Here Comes Mr. Oh	Lee Ki-young	
2013	The Secret of Birth	Shim Yeon-jung	
2013	Secret Love	Hong In-joo	
2014	Temptation	Myung-hwa	
2014	Mr. Back	Choi Mi-hye	
2015	KBS Drama Special: "Red Moon"	Middle-aged woman	
2015	All About My Mom	Han Eun-ok	
2015	All Is Well	Bae Dong-sook	
2016	Cinderella with Four Knights		
2017	Fight for My Way	Lee Ji-sook	Cameo (episode 5)
2017	School 2017	Jang So-ran	
2018	Man in the Kitchen	Choi Teresa	
2018	Mysterious Personal Shopper	Eun Sook-ja	
2018	Hide and Seek	Park Hae-ran	
2019	The Golden Garden	Han Soo-mi	
2019	I Wanna Hear Your Song	Seo Soo-hyang	
2020	No Matter What	Lee Ji-ran	
2020	Once Again	Hong Yeon-hong	
2022	Bravo, My Life	Bang Hye-ran	
2023	Meant To Be	Chae Young-eun	

=== Film ===
Year	Title	Role
2003	My Wife Is a Gangster 2	Geum Eun-bang
2003	The Greatest Expectation	Mi-ae
2004	Who's Got the Tape?	Mi-sook
2005	Love in Magic	Lee Seon-hee
2006	Three Fellas	Shim Jung-soon
2008	Life Is Beautiful	Woman at beauty parlor (cameo)
2008	Sunny	Jeni (cameo)

== Awards and nominations ==
Year	Award	Category	Nominated work	Result
2002	SBS Drama Awards	Excellence Award, Actress in a Sitcom	Dae Bak Family	Won
2004	42nd Grand Bell Awards	Best Supporting Actress	Love in Magic	Nominated
2008	SBS Drama Awards	Best Supporting Actress in a Special Planning Drama	I Love You	Nominated
2010	KBS Drama Awards	Best Supporting Actress	The Slave Hunters	Nominated
2018	MBC Drama Awards	Best Supporting Actress in a Weekend Special Project	Hide and Seek	Nominated
