= The Golden Garden =

2019 South Korean television series

- Promotional poster
- Hangul: 황금정원
- Hanja: 黃金庭院
- RR: Hwanggeumjeongwon
- MR: Hwanggŭmjŏngwŏn
- Genre: Melodrama; Mystery; Thriller; Romance
- Developed by: Kim Seung-mo
- Written by: Park Hyeon-joo
- Directed by: Lee Dae-yeong; Lee Dong-hyun
- Starring: Han Ji-hye; Lee Sang-woo; Oh Ji-eun; Lee Tae-sung
- Music by: Lee Pil-ho
- Country of origin: South Korea
- Original language: Korean
- No. of episodes: 60 (Note: In order to circumvent Korean laws that prevent commercial breaks in the middle of an episode, what would previously have been aired as single 70 minute episodes are now being repackaged as two 35 minute episodes, with two episodes being shown each night with a commercial break between the two.)

Production
- Producers: Son Ki-won; Kim Nam-pyo
- Running time: 35 minutes
- Production company: Kim Jong-hak Production

Original release
- Network: MBC TV
- Release: July 20 – October 26, 2019

The Golden Garden (Korean: 황금정원) is a 2019 South Korean television series starring Han Ji-hye, Lee Sang-woo, Oh Ji-eun and Lee Tae-sung. It aired four episodes every Saturday on MBC TV from 20:45 to 23:10 (KST), from July 20 to October 26, 2019.

== Synopsis ==
Eun Dong Joo attempts to get back her stolen life. When she was 6 years-old, she was abandoned at an orphanage. She did not remember anything except her name. Despite her difficult environment, she has grown into a woman with a positive and bright personality. Cha Pil Seung is a detective, who is good at his job. His parents died when he was young and he was then raised by his wealthy grandmother. Even though he is popular with women, he doesn't fall in love with anyone due to trauma from his parents' deaths.

== Cast ==
=== Main ===
- Han Ji-hye as Eun Dong-joo
- Lee Sang-woo as Cha Pil-seung
- Oh Ji-eun as Sabina / Eun Dong-joo
- Lee Tae-sung as Choi Joon-ki

=== Supporting ===
==== People around Dong-joo ====
- Jung Si-ah as Oh Mi-joo

==== People around Pil-seung ====
- Kim Young-ok as Kang Nam-doo
- Yeon Je-hyung as Lee Gi-yeong

==== People around Sabina ====
- Jung Young-joo as Sin Nam-sook

==== People around Joon-ki ====
- Cha Hwa-yeon as Jo Nam-hee
- Kim Yu-seok as Choi Dae-seong
- Jo Mi-ryung as Han Soo-mi

==== Others ====
- Baek Seung-hee as Seo Hye-yeong
- Kang Joon-hyuk as Lee Mit-eum
- Jung Seo-yeon as Lee Sa-rang
- Moon Ji-yoon as Lee Seong-wook

== Production ==
- The first script reading took place in May 2019.
- Han Ji-hye and Lee Sang-woo previously starred together in Marry Me Now (2018).
- Han Ji-hye and Lee Tae-sung previously starred together in Pots of Gold (2013).

== Ratings ==
- In this table, the blue numbers represent the lowest ratings and the red numbers represent the highest ratings.
- NR denotes that the drama did not rank in the top 20 daily programs on that date.
- N/A denotes that the rating is not known.
- Each night's broadcast is divided into four 35-minute episodes with three commercial breaks in between.

Ep.	Original broadcast date	Average audience share (AGB Nielsen)	
Ep.	Original broadcast date	Nationwide	Seoul
1	July 20, 2019	4.5% (NR)	—N/a
2	July 20, 2019	7.2% (14th)	6.9% (14th)
3	July 20, 2019	6.4% (19th)	6.5% (19th)
4	July 20, 2019	7.3% (13th)	7.4% (11th)
5	July 27, 2019	4.9% (NR)	—N/a
6	July 27, 2019	6.9% (14th)	6.6% (11th)
7	July 27, 2019	6.6% (17th)	—N/a
8	July 27, 2019	7.4% (10th)	6.9% (13th)
9	August 3, 2019	5.2% (19th)	4.9% (19th)
10	August 3, 2019	7.5% (8th)	7.5% (8th)
11	August 3, 2019	7.3% (9th)	6.8% (9th)
12	August 3, 2019	7.9% (5th)	7.7% (6th)
13	August 10, 2019	5.6% (NR)	—N/a
14	August 10, 2019	7.6% (8th)	7.5% (8th)
15	August 10, 2019	7.0% (14th)	7.2% (9th)
16	August 10, 2019	8.2% (5th)	8.1% (7th)
17	August 17, 2019	4.3% (NR)	—N/a
18	August 17, 2019	7.2% (11th)	7.2% (9th)
19	August 17, 2019	6.8% (14th)	6.7% (16th)
20	August 17, 2019	8.0% (6th)	8.1% (6th)
21	August 24, 2019	5.4% (20th)	5.3% (18th)
22	August 24, 2019	7.5% (8th)	7.6% (5th)
23	August 24, 2019	7.3% (10th)	7.2% (8th)
24	August 24, 2019	7.7% (7th)	7.7% (4th)
25	August 31, 2019	4.2% (NR)	—N/a
26	August 31, 2019	7.0% (7th)	6.5% (8th)
27	August 31, 2019	6.7% (11th)	6.2% (10th)
28	August 31, 2019	7.3% (6th)	6.7% (7th)
29	September 7, 2019	5.0% (NR)	—N/a
30	September 7, 2019	8.5% (9th)	8.0% (14th)
31	September 7, 2019	8.3% (10th)	7.9% (15th)
32	September 7, 2019	9.5% (8th)	9.0% (7th)
33	September 14, 2019	3.6% (NR)	—N/a
34	September 14, 2019	7.6% (7th)	6.8% (8th)
35	September 14, 2019	7.5% (9th)	6.8% (8th)
36	September 14, 2019	8.3% (4th)	7.5% (6th)
37	September 21, 2019	6.0% (NR)	—N/a
38	September 21, 2019	8.8% (7th)	7.7% (9th)
39	September 21, 2019	8.3% (8th)	7.0% (13th)
40	September 21, 2019	9.1% (6th)	7.8% (8th)
41	September 28, 2019	5.7% (18th)	5.5% (18th)
42	September 28, 2019	9.2% (5th)	8.6% (7th)
43	September 28, 2019	8.8% (7th)	8.2% (9th)
44	September 28, 2019	9.3% (4th)	8.8% (5th)
45	October 5, 2019	6.6% (15th)	6.2% (16th)
46	October 5, 2019	9.6% (6th)	9.1% (7th)
47	October 5, 2019	9.3% (7th)	8.4% (10th)
48	October 5, 2019	9.9% (5th)	9.6% (5th)
49	October 12, 2019	6.3% (16th)	5.9% (16th)
50	October 12, 2019	9.9% (5th)	9.3% (6th)
51	October 12, 2019	9.7% (6th)	8.9% (8th)
52	October 12, 2019	10.4% (3rd)	9.9% (4th)
53	October 19, 2019	6.6% (14th)	5.9% (16th)
54	October 19, 2019	9.0% (5th)	8.2% (5th)
55	October 19, 2019	9.0% (5th)	8.2% (5th)
56	October 19, 2019	9.8% (4th)	8.8% (4th)
57	October 26, 2019	4.6% (NR)	—N/a
58	October 26, 2019	7.8% (8th)	7.4% (7th)
59	October 26, 2019	6.0% (15th)	5.7% (17th)
60	October 26, 2019	9.8% (5th)	9.3% (6th)
Average		7.4%	— (Note: Due to some ratings not recorded, the exact average rating is unknown.)
