= Korea Drama Awards =

South Korean drama awards

- Current: 17th Korea Drama Awards
- Native name: 코리아 드라마 어워즈
- Awarded for: Excellence in television
- Location: Jinju, South Gyeongsang Province
- Country: South Korea
- Presented by: Korea Drama Festival Organizing Committee
- First award: 2007
- Final award: 2026
- Website: http://www.kdfo.org/

The Korea Drama Awards (Korean: 코리아 드라마 어워즈) is an awards ceremony for excellence in television in South Korea. It was established in 2007, and is held annually in October in Jinju, South Gyeongsang Province as the official main event of the annual Korea Drama Festival (which was launched a year ago). The eligibility period is October of the previous year to September of the current year. Nominees are chosen from Korean dramas that aired on the three major broadcasting networks (KBS, MBC and SBS) and cable channels.

The 2009 ceremony was cancelled due to the swine flu pandemic. The 2020 and 2021 ceremonies were cancelled due to the COVID-19 pandemic.

The 2023 ceremony was held on October 14, 2023, as an event of Korea Drama Festival at Gyeongnam Culture and Arts Center, Grand Performance Hall, Jinju. It was hosted by Gong Seo-young and Park Chan-min. Rocket Punch and pop singer Go Hyun-joo gave congratulatory performances. The grand prize was awarded to Lee Sung-min for Shadow Detective 2 and The Glory won the best drama award.

== Ceremonies ==
| Edition | Date |
|---|---|
| 1st Korea Drama Awards | 2007 |
| 2nd Korea Drama Awards | November 1, 2008 |
| 3rd Korea Drama Awards | October 2, 2010 |
| 4th Korea Drama Awards | October 2, 2011 |
| 5th Korea Drama Awards | October 2, 2012 |
| 6th Korea Drama Awards | October 2, 2013 |
| 7th Korea Drama Awards | October 1, 2014 |
| 8th Korea Drama Awards | October 9, 2015 |
| 9th Korea Drama Awards | October 7, 2016 |
| 10th Korea Drama Awards | October 2, 2017 |
| 11th Korea Drama Awards | October 2, 2018 |
| 12th Korea Drama Awards | October 2, 2019 |
| 13th Korea Drama Awards | October 8, 2022 |
| 14th Korea Drama Awards | October 14, 2023 |
| 15th Korea Drama Awards | October 12, 2024 |
| 16th Korea Drama Awards | October 11, 2025 |
| 17th Korea Drama Awards | October 10, 2026 |

== Categories ==
- Grand Prize (Daesang)
- Best Drama
- Best Production Director
- Best Screenplay
- Top Excellence Award, Actor
- Top Excellence Award, Actress
- Excellence Award, Actor
- Excellence Award, Actress
- Best Supporting Actor
- Best Supporting Actress
- Best New Actor
- Best New Actress
- Best Young Actor/Actress
- Best Original Soundtrack
- Special Jury Prize

== Grand Prize (Daesang) ==
| No. | Year | Recipient | Drama |
|---|---|---|---|
| 1 | 2007 | Kim Hee-ae | My Husband's Woman |
| 1 | 2007 | Yoo Dong-geun | Yeon Gaesomun |
| 2 | 2008 | Kim Myung-min | Beethoven Virus |
| 3 | 2010 | —N/a | —N/a |
| 4 | 2011 | —N/a | Secret Garden |
| 5 | 2012 | Kim Nam-joo | My Husband Got a Family |
| 6 | 2013 | Lee Bo-young | I Can Hear Your Voice, Seoyoung, My Daughter |
| 7 | 2014 | Kim Soo-hyun | My Love from the Star |
| 8 | 2015 | Kim Soo-hyun | The Producers |
| 9 | 2016 | Kim So-yeon | Happy Home |
| 10 | 2017 | Kim Sang-joong | The Rebel |
| 11 | 2018 | Yoo Dong-geun | Marry Me Now |
| 12 | 2019 | Choi Soo-jong | My Only One |
| 13 | 2022 | Ha Jung-woo | Narco-Saints |
| 14 | 2023 | Lee Sung-min | Shadow Detective 2 |
| 15 | 2024 | Lee Hanee | Knight Flower |
| 16 | 2025 | Ahn Jae-wook | For Eagle Brothers |

== Best Drama ==
| No. | Year | Recipient |
|---|---|---|
| 1 | 2007 | Jumong |
| 2 | 2008 | Mom's Dead Upset |
| 3 | 2010 | The Slave Hunters |
| 4 | 2011 | —N/a |
| 5 | 2012 | My Husband Got a Family |
| 6 | 2013 | Seoyoung, My Daughter |
| 7 | 2014 | My Love from the Star |
| 8 | 2015 | Misaeng |
| 9 | 2016 | Descendants of the Sun |
| 10 | 2017 | The Emperor: Owner of the Mask |
| 10 | 2017 | Guardian: The Lonely and Great God |
| 11 | 2018 | Marry Me Now |
| 12 | 2019 | Sky Castle |
| 13 | 2022 | Extraordinary Attorney Woo |
| 14 | 2023 | The Glory |
| 15 | 2024 | Queen of Tears |
| 16 | 2025 | Our Movie |

== Best Director ==
| No. | Year | Recipient | Drama | |
|---|---|---|---|---|
| 1 | 2007 | Kim Byung-wook | Unstoppable High Kick! | |
| 2 | 2008 | —N/a | | —N/a |
| 3 | 2010 | Kim Kyu-tae (Miniseries) | Iris | |
| 3 | 2010 | Lee Jung-sub (Serial Drama) | Bread, Love and Dreams | |
| 4 | 2011 | Kim Won-seok | Sungkyunkwan Scandal | |
| 5 | 2012 | Jang Tae-yoo | Deep Rooted Tree | |
| 6 | 2013 | Jo Soo-won | I Can Hear Your Voice | |
| 7 | 2014 | Shin Won-ho | Reply 1994 | |
| 8 | 2015 | Seo Soo-min and Pyo Min-soo | The Producers | |
| 9 | 2016 | Kim Jin-min | Marriage Contract | |
| 10 | 2017 | Lee Jang-soo | Good Manager | |
| 11 | 2018 | —N/a | | |
| 12 | 2019 | —N/a | | |
| 13 | 2022 | Park Joon-hwa | Alchemy of Souls | |
| 14 | 2023 | Ahn Gil-ho | The Glory | |
| 15 | 2024 | —N/a | | |

== Best Screenplay ==
| No. | Year | Recipient | Drama | |
|---|---|---|---|---|
| 1 | 2007 | —N/a | —N/a | |
| 2 | 2008 | —N/a | —N/a | |
| 3 | 2010 | Chun Sung-il (Miniseries) | The Slave Hunters | |
| 3 | 2010 | Kang Eun-kyung (Serial Drama) | Bread, Love and Dreams | |
| 4 | 2011 | Kim Eun-sook | Secret Garden | |
| 5 | 2012 | Park Ji-eun | My Husband Got a Family | |
| 6 | 2013 | Park Jae-bum | Good Doctor | |
| 7 | 2014 | Jung Hyun-min | Jeong Do-jeon | |
| 8 | 2015 | Jang Hyuk-rin | Yong-pal | |
| 9 | 2016 | Noh Hee-kyung | Dear My Friends | |
| 10 | 2017 | Park Hye-jin | The Emperor: Owner of the Mask | |
| 11 | 2018 | Park Pil-joo | Marry Me Now | |
| 12 | 2019 | Jo Jung-sun | Mother of Mine | |
| 13 | 2022 | —N/a | | —N/a |

== Top Excellence Award, Actor ==
| No. | Year | Recipient | Drama |
|---|---|---|---|
| 1 | 2007 | Kim Sang-joong | My Husband's Woman |
| 2 | 2008 | Choi Soo-jong | Dae Jo-yeong |
| 3 | 2010 | Jang Hyuk | The Slave Hunters |
| 4 | 2011 | Lee Min-ho | City Hunter |
| 5 | 2012 | Kim Sang-joong | The Chaser |
| 6 | 2013 | Jung Woong-in | I Can Hear Your Voice |
| 6 | 2013 | Lee Jung-jin | A Hundred Year Legacy |
| 7 | 2014 | Kim Jae-joong | Triangle |
| 8 | 2015 | Lee Jong-suk | Pinocchio |
| 9 | 2016 | Ahn Jae-hyun | Cinderella and Four Knights |
| 9 | 2016 | Jang Hyun-sung | The Doctors |
| 10 | 2017 | Kim Ji-seok | The Rebel |
| 10 | 2017 | Kwon Yul | Whisper |
| 11 | 2018 | Kam Woo-sung | Should We Kiss First? |
| 12 | 2019 | Kim Dong-wook | Special Labor Inspector |
| 13 | 2022 | Kim Bum | Ghost Doctor |
| 14 | 2023 | Oh Jung-se | Revenant |
| 15 | 2024 | Ji Seung-hyun | Korea-Khitan War |
| 16 | 2025 | Yook Sung-jae | The Haunted Palace |

== Top Excellence Award, Actress ==
| No. | Year | Recipient | Drama |
|---|---|---|---|
| 1 | 2007 | —N/a | —N/a |
| 2 | 2008 | Kim Ha-neul | On Air |
| 3 | 2010 | Han Hyo-joo | Dong Yi |
| 4 | 2011 | Yum Jung-ah | Royal Family |
| 5 | 2012 | Han Ji-min | Rooftop Prince |
| 6 | 2013 | Jo Yoon-hee | Nine: Nine Time Travels |
| 7 | 2014 | Oh Yeon-seo | Jang Bo-ri is Here! |
| 8 | 2015 | Kim Tae-hee | Yong-pal |
| 9 | 2016 | Baek Jin-hee | My Daughter, Geum Sa-wol |
| 10 | 2017 | Lee Ha-nui | The Rebel |
| 11 | 2018 | Wang Bit-na | Mysterious Personal Shopper |
| 12 | 2019 | Kim Min-jung | My Fellow Citizens! |
| 13 | 2022 | Shin Hyun-been | Reflection of You |
| 14 | 2023 | Kim Sun-a | Queen of Masks |
| 15 | 2024 | Go Min Si | Sweet Home 2 |
| 16 | 2025 | Park Bo-young | Our Unwritten Seoul |

== Excellence Award, Actor ==
| No. | Year | Recipient | Drama |
|---|---|---|---|
| 1 | 2007 | —N/a | —N/a |
| 2 | 2008 | Kim Rae-won | Gourmet |
| 3 | 2010 | —N/a | —N/a |
| 4 | 2011 | —N/a | —N/a |
| 5 | 2012 | Lee Hee-joon | My Husband Got a Family |
| 5 | 2012 | Kwak Do-won | Phantom |
| 6 | 2013 | Lee Jong-suk | I Can Hear Your Voice |
| 6 | 2013 | Kim Dong-wan | Cheer Up, Mr. Kim! |
| 7 | 2014 | Lee Kwang-soo | It's Okay, That's Love |
| 8 | 2015 | Lee Joon | Heard It Through the Grapevine |
| 8 | 2015 | Kim Dae-myung | Misaeng |
| 9 | 2016 | Jo Jae-yoon | Descendants of the Sun |
| 10 | 2017 | Jeon No-min | The Emperor: Owner of the Mask |
| 10 | 2017 | Min Jin-woong | My Father is Strange |
| 11 | 2018 | Hwang Chan-sung | What's Wrong with Secretary Kim |
| 11 | 2018 | On Joo-wan | Man in the Kitchen |
| 12 | 2019 | Kang Ki-young | At Eighteen |
| 12 | 2019 | Lee Kyu-hyung | Doctor John |
| 13 | 2022 | Lee Ki-woo | My Liberation Notes |
| 14 | 2023 | Kim Sung-kyun | D.P. 2 |
| 14 | 2023 | Lee Sang-yi | Bloodhounds |
| 15 | 2024 | Yim Si-wan | Boyhood |
| 16 | 2025 | Lee Hyun-wook | The Queen Who Crowns, Shark: The Storm |

== Excellence Award, Actress ==
| No. | Year | Recipient | Drama |
|---|---|---|---|
| 1 | 2007 | —N/a | —N/a |
| 2 | 2008 | Han Ji-hye | Likeable or Not |
| 3 | 2010 | —N/a | —N/a |
| 4 | 2011 | —N/a | —N/a |
| 5 | 2012 | Song Seon-mi | Golden Time |
| 6 | 2013 | Seo Hyun-jin | Here Comes Mr. Oh |
| 7 | 2014 | Kang So-ra | Doctor Stranger |
| 8 | 2015 | Choi Soo-young | My Spring Days |
| 9 | 2016 | Park Se-young | My Daughter, Geum Sa-wol |
| 10 | 2017 | Lee Il-hwa | Good Manager |
| 10 | 2017 | Song Ha-yoon | Fight for My Way |
| 11 | 2018 | Chae Jung-an | Suits |
| 12 | 2019 | Lee Se-young | The Crowned Clown |
| 13 | 2022 | Jeon So-min | Show Window: The Queen's House |
| 14 | 2023 | Kim Ji-eun | Longing for You |
| 15 | 2024 | Jung Ryeo-Won | The Midnight Romance in Hagwon |
| 16 | 2025 | Kim Ji-yeon | The Haunted Palace |

== Best Supporting Actor ==
| No. | Year | Recipient | Drama |
|---|---|---|---|
| 1 | 2007 | —N/a | —N/a |
| 2 | 2008 | —N/a | —N/a |
| 3 | 2010 | Jung Dong-hwan | Dong Yi |
| 4 | 2011 | Joo Sang-wook | Giant |
| 5 | 2012 | —N/a | —N/a |
| 6 | 2013 | —N/a | —N/a |
| 7 | 2014 | —N/a | —N/a |
| 8 | 2015 | —N/a | —N/a |
| 9 | 2016 | —N/a | —N/a |
| 10 | 2017 | —N/a | —N/a |
| 11 | 2018 | —N/a | —N/a |
| 12 | 2019 | —N/a | —N/a |
| 13 | 2022 | Park Ho-san | Today's Webtoon |
| 14 | 2023 | Ahn Se-ha | King the Land |

== Best Supporting Actress ==
| No. | Year | Recipient | Drama |
|---|---|---|---|
| 1 | 2007 | —N/a | —N/a |
| 2 | 2008 | —N/a | —N/a |
| 3 | 2010 | Kim Hae-sook | Life Is Beautiful |
| 4 | 2011 | Lee Yoo-ri | Twinkle Twinkle |
| 5 | 2012 | —N/a | —N/a |
| 6 | 2013 | —N/a | —N/a |
| 7 | 2014 | —N/a | —N/a |
| 8 | 2015 | —N/a | —N/a |
| 9 | 2016 | —N/a | —N/a |
| 10 | 2017 | —N/a | —N/a |
| 11 | 2018 | —N/a | —N/a |
| 12 | 2019 | —N/a | —N/a |
| 13 | 2022 | Hwang Bo-ra | Kiss Sixth Sense |
| 14 | 2023 | So Joo-yeon | Dr. Romantic 3 |

== Best New Actor ==
| No. | Year | Recipient | Drama |
|---|---|---|---|
| 1 | 2007 | —N/a | —N/a |
| 2 | 2008 | —N/a | —N/a |
| 3 | 2010 | Yoon Shi-yoon | Bread, Love and Dreams |
| 4 | 2011 | Kim Soo-hyun | Dream High |
| 5 | 2012 | Seo In-guk | Reply 1997 |
| 6 | 2013 | Park Seo-joon | Pots of Gold |
| 6 | 2013 | Yong Jun-hyung | Monstar |
| 7 | 2014 | Ahn Jae-hyun | My Love from the Star |
| 7 | 2014 | Seo Kang-joon | Cunning Single Lady |
| 8 | 2015 | Park Chanyeol | Exo Next Door |
| 9 | 2016 | Seo Ha-joon | The Flower in Prison |
| 10 | 2017 | Yook Sung-jae | Guardian: The Lonely and Great God |
| 11 | 2018 | Cha Eun-woo | Gangnam Beauty |
| 12 | 2019 | Ong Seong-wu | At Eighteen |
| 13 | 2022 | Kim Do-hoon | Today's Webtoon |
| 14 | 2023 | Park Ji-hoon | Weak Hero Class 1 |
| 15 | 2024 | Lee Si-woo | Boyhood |
| 15 | 2024 | Baek Seo-hoo | Miss Night and Day |
| 16 | 2025 | Choo Young-woo | The Tale of Lady Ok, Head Over Heels |
| 16 | 2025 | Heo Nam-jun | When the Phone Rings, When the Stars Gossip |

== Best New Actress ==
| No. | Year | Recipient | Drama |
|---|---|---|---|
| 1 | 2007 | —N/a | —N/a |
| 2 | 2008 | —N/a | —N/a |
| 3 | 2010 | Seo Woo | Cinderella's Sister |
| 4 | 2011 | Im Soo-hyang | New Tales of Gisaeng |
| 5 | 2012 | Yoon Jin-yi | A Gentleman's Dignity |
| 6 | 2013 | BoA | Waiting for Love |
| 7 | 2014 | Min Do-hee | Reply 1994 |
| 8 | 2015 | Lim Ji-yeon | High Society |
| 9 | 2016 | Kim Sae-ron | Mirror of the Witch |
| 10 | 2017 | Ko Won-hee | Strongest Deliveryman |
| 11 | 2018 | Seo Eun-soo | My Golden Life |
| 12 | 2019 | Kwon Nara | Doctor Prisoner |
| 13 | 2022 | Bae Woo-hee | A Business Proposal |
| 13 | 2022 | Bona | Twenty-Five Twenty-One |
| 14 | 2023 | Lee Yeon | Delightfully Deceitful |
| 15 | 2024 | Kang Hye-won | Boyhood |
| 16 | 2025 | Chung Su-bin | Friendly Rivalry |
| 16 | 2025 | Hong Hwa-yeon | Buried Hearts, Tastefully Yours, I Am a Running Mate |

== Best Young Actor/Actress ==
| No. | Year | Recipient | Drama |
|---|---|---|---|
| 1 | 2007 | —N/a | —N/a |
| 2 | 2008 | —N/a | —N/a |
| 3 | 2010 | —N/a | —N/a |
| 4 | 2011 | —N/a | —N/a |
| 5 | 2012 | Kwak Dong-yeon | My Husband Got a Family |
| 6 | 2013 | Kal So-won | The Secret of Birth |
| 7 | 2014 | Kim Ji-young | Jang Bo-ri is Here! |
| 8 | 2015 | —N/a | —N/a |
| 9 | 2016 | —N/a | —N/a |

== Best Original Soundtrack ==
| No. | Year | Recipient | Drama |
|---|---|---|---|
| 1 | 2007 | —N/a | —N/a |
| 2 | 2008 | —N/a | —N/a |
| 3 | 2010 | —N/a | —N/a |
| 4 | 2011 | Huh Gak – "Don't Forget Me" | The Greatest Love |
| 5 | 2012 | Lyn – "Back in Time" | Moon Embracing the Sun |
| 6 | 2013 | 4Men – "Only You" | Gu Family Book |
| 7 | 2014 | Ailee – "Goodbye My Love" | Fated to Love You |
| 8 | 2015 | Jang Jae-in – "Auditory Hallucination" | Kill Me, Heal Me |
| 9 | 2016 | Insooni – "It's Okay Because I Am A Mom" | My Mom |
| 10 | 2017 | DinDin – "Must Be The Money" | Good Manager |
| 11 | 2018 | Monday Kiz – "The Person Within Me" | Marry Me Now |
| 12 | 2019 | Ha Jin - "We All Lie" | Sky Castle |
| 15 | 2024 | Kim Tae-rae (Zerobaseone) – "More Than Enough" | Queen of Tears |
| 16 | 2025 | Young Tak – "An Unknown Life" | For Eagle Brothers |

== Special Jury Prize ==
| No. | Year | Recipient | Drama |
|---|---|---|---|
| 1 | 2007 | —N/a | —N/a |
| 2 | 2008 | Kim Hae-sook | First Wives' Club |
| 3 | 2010 | Kim Byung-wook | High Kick Through the Roof |
| 4 | 2011 | —N/a | —N/a |
| 5 | 2012 | Lee Hee-joon | My Husband Got a Family |
| 5 | 2012 | —N/a | Queen Insoo |
| 6 | 2013 | —N/a | —N/a |
| 7 | 2014 | —N/a | —N/a |
| 8 | 2015 | Yim Si-wan | Misaeng |
| 9 | 2016 | So Yoo-jin | Five Enough |
| 10 | 2017 | —N/a | —N/a |

== Most Popular Actor ==
| No. | Year | Recipient | Drama |
|---|---|---|---|
| 1 | 2007 | Kim Dong-wook | Coffee Prince |
| 1 | 2007 | Kim Jae-wook | Coffee Prince |
| 1 | 2007 | Lee Eon | Coffee Prince |
| 1 | 2007 | Lee Han-wi | Coffee Prince |
| 2 | 2008 | Kim Bum | East of Eden |
| 3 | 2010 | Jung Yong-hwa | You're Beautiful |
| 4 | 2011 | Kim Soo-hyun | Dream High |
| 5 | 2012 | —N/a | —N/a |
| 6 | 2013 | —N/a | —N/a |
| 7 | 2014 | —N/a | —N/a |
| 8 | 2015 | —N/a | —N/a |
| 9 | 2016 | —N/a | —N/a |
| 10 | 2017 | —N/a | —N/a |

== Most Popular Actress ==
| No. | Year | Recipient | Drama |
|---|---|---|---|
| 1 | 2007 | —N/a | —N/a |
| 2 | 2008 | Im Yoona | You're My Destiny |
| 2 | 2008 | Kim Hee-jung | First Wives' Club |
| 2 | 2008 | Kim Hyun-sook | Rude Miss Young-ae – Season 3 |
| 3 | 2010 | Hwang Jung-eum | High Kick Through the Roof |
| 4 | 2011 | —N/a | —N/a |
| 5 | 2012 | —N/a | —N/a |
| 6 | 2013 | —N/a | —N/a |
| 7 | 2014 | —N/a | —N/a |
| 8 | 2015 | —N/a | —N/a |
| 9 | 2016 | —N/a | —N/a |
| 10 | 2017 | —N/a | —N/a |

== Best Couple Award ==
| No. | Year | Recipient | Drama |
|---|---|---|---|
| 1 | 2007 | —N/a | —N/a |
| 2 | 2008 | —N/a | —N/a |
| 3 | 2010 | —N/a | —N/a |
| 4 | 2011 | —N/a | —N/a |
| 5 | 2012 | Seo In-guk and Jung Eun-ji | Reply 1997 |
| 6 | 2013 | Lee Jong-suk and Lee Bo-young | I Can Hear Your Voice |
| 7 | 2014 | Kim Sung-kyun and Min Do-hee | Reply 1994 |
| 8 | 2015 | —N/a | —N/a |
| 9 | 2016 | —N/a | —N/a |
| 10 | 2017 | —N/a | —N/a |
| 15 | 2024 | Kim Soo-hyun and Kim Ji-won | Queen of Tears |
| 16 | 2025 | Lee Hye-ri and Chung Su-bin | Friendly Rivalry |

== Hallyu Star Award ==
| No. | Year | Recipient | Drama |
|---|---|---|---|
| 1 | 2007 | —N/a | —N/a |
| 2 | 2008 | Bae Yong-joon | The Legend |
| 3 | 2010 | —N/a | —N/a |
| 4 | 2011 | Lee Min-ho | City Hunter |
| 5 | 2012 | —N/a | —N/a |
| 6 | 2013 | —N/a | —N/a |
| 7 | 2014 | Kim Soo-hyun | My Love from the Star |
| 8 | 2015 | Kim Soo-hyun | The Producers |
| 8 | 2015 | Park Chanyeol | Exo Next Door |
| 9 | 2016 | Han Seung-yeon | Hello, My Twenties! |
| 10 | 2017 | Kwon Mina | Hospital Ship |
| 10 | 2017 | Park Gyu-ri | Lovers in Bloom |
| 11 | 2018 | Hwang Chan-sung | What's Wrong with Secretary Kim |
| 11 | 2018 | Cha Eun-woo | Gangnam Beauty |
| 12 | 2019 | Ong Seong-wu | At Eighteen |

== Lifetime Achievement Award ==
| No. | Year | Recipient | Drama |
|---|---|---|---|
| 1 | 2007 | Lee Soon-jae | High Kick! |
| 2 | 2008 | Baek Il-seob | Mom's Dead Upset |
| 3 | 2010 | Lee Byung-hoon | Dong Yi |
| 4 | 2011 | —N/a | |
| 5 | 2012 | —N/a | |
| 6 | 2013 | —N/a | |
| 7 | 2014 | —N/a | |
| 8 | 2015 | Kim Young-ae | —N/a |
| 9 | 2016 | Im Dong-jin | The Jingbirok: A Memoir of Imjin War |
| 10 | 2017 | Jung Young-sook | Dal Soon's Spring |
| 11 | 2018 | Kim Young-ok | Rich Family's Son |
| 12 | 2019 | Jung Dong-hwan | Hotel Del Luna |
| 13 | 2022 | Choi Bool-am | —N/a |
| 14 | 2023 | Kil Yong-woo | —N/a |
| 15 | 2024 | Byun Hee-bong | —N/a |
| 16 | 2025 | Kim Yong-rim | —N/a |

== Other Awards ==
| No. | Year | Award | Recipient | Drama |
|---|---|---|---|---|
| 1 | 2007 | Special Award | Kim Yeong-cheol | How Much Love? |
| 1 | 2007 | Special Award | Yang Jung-a | Here Comes Ajumma |
| 1 | 2007 | Best Drama; Voted by Asian Viewers | —N/a | Super Rookie |
| 3 | 2010 | Best TV Producer | Chung Tae-won | Iris |
| 3 | 2010 | New Media Award | Jo Hyun-tak | Golden House |
| 4 | 2011 | Special Award for Cable TV | Jeon Hye-bin | Yaksha |
| 6 | 2013 | Hot Star Award | Clara | Goddess of Marriage |
| 7 | 2014 | Hot Star Award | Shin Sung-rok | My Love from the Star |
| 7 | 2014 | Global Star Award | Ryohei Otani | Gunman in Joseon |
| 8 | 2015 | KDA Award | Park Hae-jin | Bad Guys |
| 8 | 2015 | Hot Star Award | Seo Kang-joon | Splendid Politics |
| 8 | 2015 | Star of the Year Award | Kim So-hyun | Who Are You: School 2015 |
| 8 | 2015 | Global Star Award | Sam Okyere | Warm and Cozy |
| 9 | 2016 | Hot Star Award | Lee Ki-woo | Memory |
| 9 | 2016 | Star of the Year Award | Kim So-yeon | Happy Home |
| 9 | 2016 | Global Star Award | Ahn Jae-hyun | Cinderella and Four Knights |
| 9 | 2016 | Global Management Award | Moon Bo-mi | —N/a |
| 10 | 2017 | KDA Award | Huh Joon-ho | The Emperor: Owner of the Mask |
| 10 | 2017 | Hot Star Award | Lee Tae-im | Woman of Dignity |
| 10 | 2017 | Star of the Year Award | Yook Sung-jae | Guardian: The Lonely and Great God |
| 10 | 2017 | Popular Character Award | Kim Byung-cheol | Guardian: The Lonely and Great God |
| 10 | 2017 | Popular Character Award | Park Kyung-hye | Guardian: The Lonely and Great God |
| 10 | 2017 | Global Management Award | Cube Entertainment | —N/a |
| 11 | 2018 | Star of the Year Award | Jo Woo-ri | Gangnam Beauty |
| 11 | 2018 | Popular Character Award | Jung Sang-hoon | My Contracted Husband, Mr. Oh |
| 11 | 2018 | Popular Character Award | Pyo Ye-jin | What's Wrong with Secretary Kim |
| 11 | 2018 | KDA Award | Park Jung-sook | —N/a |
| 12 | 2019 | Star of the Year Award | Go Jun | The Fiery Priest |
| 12 | 2019 | Star of the Year Award | Shin Ye-eun | He Is Psychometric |
| 12 | 2019 | Popular Character Award | Ahn Chang-hwan | The Fiery Priest |
| 12 | 2019 | Popular Character Award | Kim Bo-ra | Sky Castle |
| 12 | 2019 | Hot Star China Award | Kim Seo-hyung | Sky Castle |
| 13 | 2022 | Global Excellence Award | Lee Jae-wook | Alchemy of Souls |
| 13 | 2022 | Global Star Award | Kim Myung-soo | Royal Secret Agent |
| 13 | 2022 | KDF Award | Min Chae-eun | Namgang blues |
| 14 | 2023 | Global Star Award | Bae Hyun-sung | Miraculous Brothers |
| 14 | 2023 | KDF Award | Jung Hee-tae | Reborn Rich |
| 14 | 2023 | Hot Star Award Male | Ko Kyu-pil | Heartbeat |
| 14 | 2023 | Hot Star Award Female | Jung Yoo-min | Celebrity |
| 15 | 2024 | Global Star Award | Kim Soo-hyun | Queen of Tears |
| 15 | 2024 | Hot Star Award Female | Kim Ji-won | Queen of Tears |
| 15 | 2024 | Hot Star Award Male | Byeon Woo-seok | Lovely Runner |
| 15 | 2024 | Best Villain Award | Lee Yi-kyung | Marry My Husband |
| 16 | 2025 | Global Star Award | Byeon Woo-seok | —N/a |
| 16 | 2025 | Hot Star Award Male | Byeon Woo-seok | —N/a |
| 16 | 2025 | Hot Star Award Female | Chung Su-bin | —N/a |
| 16 | 2025 | Multitainer Award | Park Jae-chan | —N/a |
| 16 | 2025 | Scene Stealer Award Male | Lee Hae-young | Buried Hearts, Unmasked |
| 16 | 2025 | Scene Stealer Award Female | Lee Ho-jung | Good Boy |
| 16 | 2025 | Best Villain Award | Oh Jung-se | Good Boy |

== See also ==
- List of Asian television awards
