= Lee Sang-woo =

South Korean actor (born 1980)

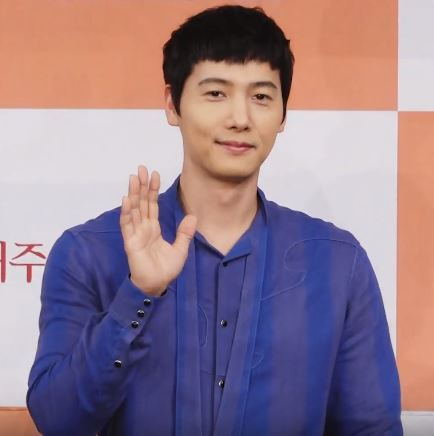
- Lee in July 2019
- Born: February 13, 1980 (age 46); Seoul, South Korea
- Education: Korea University – Department of Food Science and Biotechnology
- Occupation: Actor
- Years active: 2005–present
- Agent: Alomalo Humane Entertainment
- Spouse: Kim So-yeon (m. 2017)

Korean name
- Hangul: 이상우
- Hanja: 李尚禹
- RR: I Sangu
- MR: I Sangu

Lee Sang-woo (Korean: 이상우; born February 13, 1980) is a South Korean actor. He rose to fame in the 2007 television drama First Wives' Club, and has since played leading roles on The Road Home (2009), Don't Hesitate (2009), Life Is Beautiful (2010), and Feast of the Gods (2012).

== Career ==
Lee Sang-woo launched his acting career in 2005, starring in a Drama City episode and a minor role in the television drama 18 vs. 29. This was followed by more supporting roles on television, including his big screen debut in Almost Love, a romantic comedy film headlined by Kwon Sang-woo and Kim Ha-neul. During this time, he also starred as one of the three leading actors of the independent film Don't Look Back (2006), which was the closing film of that year's Jeonju International Film Festival, and won a critic's prize at the Locarno International Film Festival.

Lee began his rise to fame with a supporting role in First Wives' Club, a popular drama which aired from 2007 to 2008 with a peak viewership rating of 41.3%. For his performance, he received a New Star Award at the SBS Drama Awards.

It was not until 2009 that Lee was cast in his first mainstream leading role, in The Road Home, followed soon after by another daily drama Don't Hesitate. In the same year, he also appeared as one of the leading actors in Searching for the Elephant, an erotic-psychological thriller about three thirty-something men struggling with schizophrenia, sex addiction and infidelity.

In 2010, Lee starred with Song Chang-eui in Life Is Beautiful as a gay couple. The drama is one of the few Korean dramas about an openly gay couple in Korean society, which have conservative views on sexuality. Despite the controversy, the show was successful in the ratings, and Lee would later work again with renowned screenwriter Kim Soo-hyun on A Thousand Days' Promise (2011) and Childless Comfort (2012).

After a supporting role in Believe in Love (also known as My Love, My Family, 2011), Lee was once again cast in the leading role in Feast of the Gods (2012). He later won the Excellence Award, Actor in a Special Project Drama at the MBC Drama Awards for Feast of the Gods and his supporting role in the period drama The King's Doctor.

In 2013, Lee joined the ensemble cast of Goddess of Marriage, followed by the adultery drama One Warm Word. Unlike his previous calm and quiet roles, in 2014 he was cast as the leading man in Glorious Day, a peculiar character which Lee said he looked forward to playing since it most resembles his real-life personality.

Lee then starred in two weekend dramas, All About My Mom and Happy Home. He returned to prime-time television, starring in romantic comedy drama 20th Century Boy and Girl.

In 2018, Lee was cast in the KBS2 weekend drama Marry Me Now as a doctor and was partnered with Han Ji-hye.

In 2019, Lee starred in the legal romantic comedy drama Touch Your Heart as an elite prosecutor. In the same year, Lee made a special appearance in the KBS drama Mother of Mine. Lee later appeared in the MBC drama The Golden Garden.

In 2020, Lee made a special appearance in the drama. Lovestruck in the City

In 2021, Lee made a special appearance in the SBS drama The Penthouse: War in Life 2. Later, Lee participated in the variety golf show King of Golf aired on TV Chosun along with Yang Se-hyung, Lee Dong-gook, and Jang Min-ho, and Lee was confirmed to participate in the TV Chosun drama Uncle.

== Personal life ==
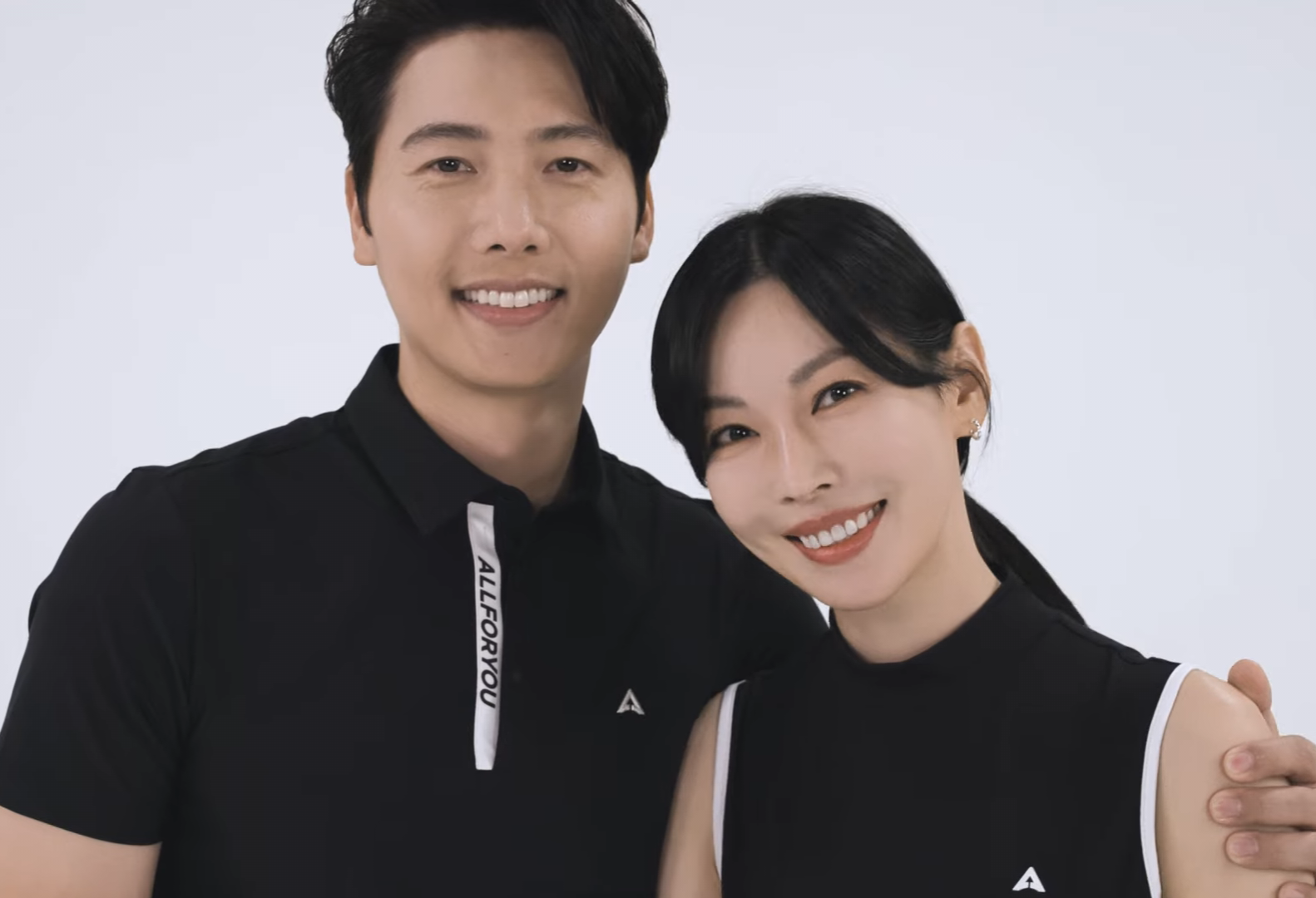
Lee and Kim in 2022

Lee married actress Kim So-yeon in June 2017. Their romantic relationship started in 2016. The pair met on the set of MBC's weekend drama Happy Home.

== Filmography ==
=== Film ===
| Year | Title | Role | Notes | Ref. |
|---|---|---|---|---|
| 2006 | Almost Love | Moon Young-hoon | | |
| 2006 | Don't Look Back | Geun-woo | | |
| 2008 | Black Heart (Beyond All Magic) | Jun | | |
| 2009 | Searching for the Elephant | Jin-hyuk | | |
| TBA | The Hotel | Mr. Yoon | | |

=== Television series ===
| Year | Title | Role | Notes | Ref. |
|---|---|---|---|---|
| 2005 | Drama City No One Loves Me | Jo Seung-joo | | |
| 2005 | 18 vs. 29 | Kang Bong-kyu | | |
| 2005 | Can Love Be Refilled? | Lee Sang-woo | | |
| 2007 | Two Outs in the Ninth Inning | Lee Joon-mo | | |
| 2007 | First Wives' Club | Koo Se-joo | | |
| 2009 | The Road Home | Yoo Hyun-soo | | |
| 2009 | Don't Hesitate | Han Tae-woo | | |
| 2010 | Life Is Beautiful | Kim Kyung-soo | | |
| 2011 | Believe in Love | Han Seung-woo | | |
| 2011 | A Thousand Days' Promise | Jang Jae-min | | |
| 2012 | Feast of the Gods | Kim Do-yoon | | |
| 2012 | The King's Doctor | Lee Sung-ha | | |
| 2012 | My Kids Give Me a Headache | Ha In-chul | Cameo | |
| 2013 | Goddess of Marriage | Kim Hyun-woo | | |
| 2013 | One Warm Word | Kim Sung-soo | | |
| 2014 | Let's Eat | Kim Sung-soo | Cameo (Episode 8) | |
| 2014 | Glorious Day | Seo Jae-woo | | |
| 2015 | High Society | Jang Kyung-joon | Cameo (Episode 1–4, 15–16) | |
| 2015 | All About My Mom | Kang Hoon-jae | | |
| 2016 | Happy Home | Seo Ji-geon | | |
| 2017 | Children of the 20th Century | Anthony / Lee Chul-min | | |
| 2018 | Marry Me Now | Jung Eun-tae | | |
| 2019 | Touch Your Heart | Kim Se-won | | |
| 2019 | Mother of Mine | Mi-ri's blinddate | Cameo (Episode 1) | |
| 2019 | The Golden Garden | Cha Pil-seung | | |
| 2021 | The Penthouse: War in Life 2 | Reporter Son Hyung-jin | Cameo (Episode 2 & 4) | |
| 2021–2022 | Uncle | Joo Kyung-il | | |
| 2022 | Shooting Stars | Han Seung-Il | Cameo (Episode 4) | |
| 2022–2023 | Red Balloon | Go Ji-won | | |

=== Web series ===
| Year | Title | Role | Notes | Ref. |
|---|---|---|---|---|
| 2020 | Lovestruck in the City | Bin | Cameo (Episode 1,3–4,12) | |

=== Television shows ===
| Year | Title | Role | Notes | Ref. |
|---|---|---|---|---|
| 2017 | It's Dangerous Beyond the Blankets | Main cast | | |
| 2021 | King of Golf | Main cast | Season 1 | |
| 2022 | King of Golf | Special trainee | Season 3; Episode Dubai Special | |

=== Music video appearances ===
| Year | Song title | Artist |
|---|---|---|
| 2004 | "Nitpicking" | Kim Gun-mo |
| 2007 | "Loving One Person" | Oh Hyun-ran |
| 2007 | "My Angel" | Fly to the Sky |
| 2007 | "Pretty Today Too" | Fly to the Sky |

== Awards and nominations ==
Name of the award ceremony, year presented, category, nominee of the award, and the result of the nomination
| Award ceremony | Year | Category | Nominee / Work | Result | Ref. |
|---|---|---|---|---|---|
| Andre Kim Best Star Awards | 2008 | Male Star Award | First Wives' Club | Won | |
| APAN Star Awards | 2015 | Excellence Award, Actor in a Serial Drama | All About My Mom | Nominated | |
| APAN Star Awards | 2018 | Top Excellence Award, Actor in a Serial Drama | Marry Me Now | Won | |
| APAN Star Awards | 2021 | Top Excellence Award, Actor in a Serial Drama | The Golden Garden | Nominated | |
| Baeksang Arts Awards | 2009 | Best New Actor – Television | First Wives' Club | Nominated | |
| KBS Drama Awards | 2009 | Excellence Award, Actor in a Daily Drama | The Road Home | Nominated | |
| KBS Drama Awards | 2015 | Excellence Award, Actor in a Serial Drama | All About My Mom | Nominated | |
| KBS Drama Awards | 2015 | Netizen Award, Actor | All About My Mom | Nominated | |
| KBS Drama Awards | 2015 | Best Couple Award | Lee Sang-woo (with Eugene); All About My Mom | Nominated | |
| KBS Drama Awards | 2018 | Excellence Award, Actor in a Serial Drama | Marry Me Now | Won | |
| KBS Drama Awards | 2018 | Netizen Award, Actor | Marry Me Now | Nominated | |
| KBS Drama Awards | 2018 | Best Couple Award | Lee Sang-woo (with Han Ji-hye); Marry Me Now | Nominated | |
| Korea Drama Awards | 2018 | Top Excellence Award, Actor | Marry Me Now | Nominated | |
| MBC Drama Awards | 2012 | Excellence Award, Actor in a Special Project Drama | Feast of the Gods, The King's Doctor | Won | |
| MBC Drama Awards | 2016 | Top Excellence Award, Actor in a Serial Drama | Happy Home | Won | |
| MBC Drama Awards | 2016 | Best Couple Award | Lee Sang-woo (with Kim So-yeon); Happy Home | Nominated | |
| MBC Drama Awards | 2017 | Excellence Award, Actor in a Monday-Tuesday Drama | Children of the 20th Century | Nominated | |
| MBC Drama Awards | 2019 | Grand Prize (Daesang) | The Golden Garden | Nominated | |
| MBC Drama Awards | 2019 | Top Excellence Award, Actor in a Weekend Drama | The Golden Garden | Won | |
| SBS Drama Awards | 2008 | New Star Award | First Wives' Club | Won | |
| SBS Drama Awards | 2011 | Excellence Award, Actor in a Special Planning Drama | A Thousand Days' Promise | Nominated | |
| SBS Drama Awards | 2013 | Excellence Award, Actor in a Weekend/Daily Drama | Goddess of Marriage | Nominated | |
| SBS Drama Awards | 2014 | Top Excellence Award, Actor in a Serial Drama | Glorious Day | Nominated | |
