= Samhwa Networks =

Korean drama production company

Samhwa Networks Co., Ltd.
- Samhwa Networks's logo
- Type: Joint-stock
- Traded as: KRX: 046390
- Industry: entertainment and media production
- Founded: September 1980; 46 years ago (as Samhwa Video Production Co., Ltd.)
- Founder: Shin Hyun-taek
- Headquarters: 705-17, Yeoksam-dong, Gangnam District, Seoul, South Korea
- Area served: South Korea
- Key people: Ahn Je-hyun (Note: Shin Chae-eun's husband; Shin Hyun-taek and Nam Sook-ja's son-in-law; Shin Sang-yoon's brother-in-law) (CEO); Shin Sang-yoon (Note: Eldest son of Shin Hyun-taek, the company's founder, and Nam Sook-ja) (CEO)
- Products: TV series
- Services: production
- Revenue: 14,917,372,948 (June 30, 2015)
- Operating income: -584,639,146 won (June 30, 2015)
- Net income: -346,712,393 won (June 30, 2015)
- Total equity: 8,556,586,600 won (June 30, 2015)
- Owner: As of 2019: Shin Sang-yoon (18.00%); Nam Sook-ja (Note: Shin Hyun-taek's widow) (12.91%); Shin Chae-eun (Note: Shin Hyun-taek and Nam Sook-ja's daughter; Shin Sang-yoon's sister) (5.83%); Ahn Je-hyun (1.97%)
- Number of employees: 36 (June 2017)
- Subsidiaries: Studio Icon; WS Entertainment

Korean name
- Hangul: 삼화네트웍스
- RR: Samhwa neteuwokseu
- MR: Samhwa net'ŭwŏksŭ
- Website: www.shnetworks.co.kr

Samhwa Networks (Korean: 삼화네트웍스) is a Korean drama production company. Founded in 1980 by Shin Hyun-taek as a home video distributor, it later became well-known because of its drama productions.

As of 2019, Shin's family (including his eldest son and son-in-law, who are the co-CEO's of the company) owns 38.71% of its stocks. The rest are owned by the public.

== List of works ==
Year	Title	Network	Note(s)
1999	Street King	MBC TV	—N/a
2001	Empress Myeongseong	KBS2	in association with GM Agency
2004	Terms of Endearment	KBS2	—N/a
2004	Precious Family	KBS2	
2006	Snow Flower	SBS TV	—N/a
2007	Daughters-in-Law	KBS2	—N/a
2007	My Husband's Woman	SBS TV	in association with Segyo Entertainment and Media Plant
2007	First Wives' Club	SBS TV	—N/a
2007	Evasive Inquiry Agency	KBS2	—N/a
2008	Mom's Dead Upset	KBS2	—N/a
2008	Bitter Sweet Life	MBC TV	—N/a
2009	Temptation of an Angel	SBS TV	—N/a
2010	Life Is Beautiful	SBS TV	—N/a
2010	Bread, Love and Dreams	KBS2	—N/a
2011	My Love, My Family	KBS2	—N/a
2011	Paradise Ranch	SBS TV	in association with SM Entertainment
2011	Living in Style	SBS TV	—N/a
2012	Daddy's Sorry	TV Chosun	—N/a
2012	My Kids Give Me a Headache	JTBC	—N/a
2013	Gu Family Book	MBC TV	—N/a
2013	Goddess of Marriage	SBS TV	—N/a
2014	Wonderful Days	KBS2	—N/a
2014	What Happens to My Family?	KBS2	—N/a
2015	My Heart Twinkle Twinkle	SBS TV	—N/a
2015	Divorce Lawyer in Love	SBS TV	in association with JS Top Entertainment
2016	Bong-soon - A Cyborg in Love	Naver TV / UMAX	—N/a
2016	Uncontrollably Fond	KBS2	in association with iHQ
2016	Dr. Romantic	SBS TV	—N/a
2016	Father, I'll Take Care of You	MBC TV	in association with GnG Production
2016	My Horrible Boss	JTBC	in association with Drama House Studio
2017	Revolutionary Love	tvN	in association with Studio Dragon
2018	Where Stars Land	SBS TV	in association with Kim Jong-hak Production
2018	Dokgo Rewind	KakaoPage / oksusu	—N/a
2019	The Fiery Priest	SBS TV	—N/a
2019	Investiture of the Gods	Hunan Television	in association with Mango Studio, Cathay Media Group, China Television Production Center and CCTV
2019	A Place in the Sun	KBS2	—N/a
2019	Be Melodramatic	JTBC	—N/a
2019	Graceful Family	MBN / Dramax	—N/a
2020	Dr. Romantic 2	SBS TV	—N/a
2020	Mystic Pop-up Bar	JTBC	in association with Drama House Studio
2020	Phoenix 2020	SBS TV	—N/a
2021	Now, We Are Breaking Up	SBS TV	in association with United Artist Agency (Spackman Entertainment Group)
2022	From Now On, Showtime!	MBC TV	—N/a
2022	Again My Life	SBS TV	in association with Kross Pictures
2022	The Golden Spoon	MBC TV	In association with Studio N
2023	Brain Works	KBS2	—N/a
2023	Longing for You	ENA	—N/a
2024	Wonderful World	MBC TV	—N/a
2024	Suji & Uri	KBS1	In association with Monster Union
2024	Miss Night and Day	JTBC	In association with SLL
2025	Would You Marry Me?	SBS TV	In association with Studio S
2025	Dynamite Kiss	SBS TV	In association with Studio S
2026	Nine to Six	SBS TV	In association with Studio S
