= Yoo Dong-geun =

South Korean actor (born 1956)

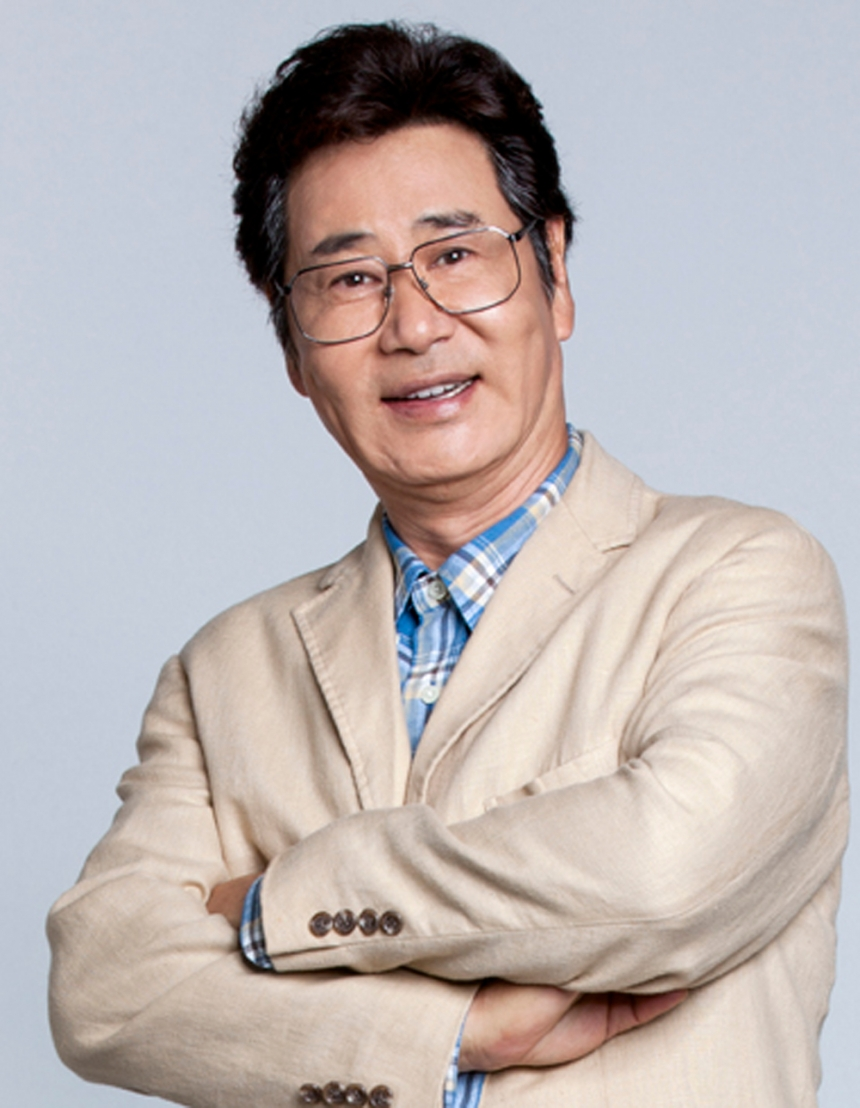
- Yoo in 2017
- Born: June 18, 1956 (age 70); Goseong, Gangwon Province, South Korea
- Other name: Yoo Dong-kun
- Education: Seoul Institute of the Arts - Theater
- Occupation: Actor
- Years active: 1980–present
- Agent: Imagine Asia
- Spouse: Jeon In-hwa (m. 1989)
- Children: 2

Korean name
- Hangul: 유동근
- Hanja: 劉東根
- RR: Yu Donggeun
- MR: Yu Tonggŭn

Yoo Dong-geun (born June 18, 1956) is a South Korean actor. He is best known for his leading roles in the historical television dramas Tears of the Dragon, Empress Myseongseong, and Yeon Gaesomun.

He was also an adjunct professor of 연기학담당 at Daekyeung University in 1997. Since 2007, Yoo has been an activist of Sunfull Movement, a non-profit organization against cyberbullying.

On December 29, 2007, Yoo landed in the news for assaulting two producers of The King and I. Yoo was reportedly enraged because the scripts were routinely turned in late, which exhausted his wife Jeon In-hwa, an actress in the TV series. He later apologized for the incident.

== Filmography ==
=== Television series ===
- Again My Life (2022)
- The Banker (2019)
- Marry Me Now (KBS2 / 2018)
- The Most Beautiful Goodbye (tvN / 2017)
- What Happens to My Family? (KBS2 / 2014)
- Jeong Do-jeon (KBS1 / 2014)
- Gu Family Book (MBC / 2013)
- My Kids Give Me a Headache (jTBC / 2012–2013)
- Athena: Goddess of War (SBS / 2010–2011)
- What Happens to My Family? (MBC / 2010)
- East of Eden (MBC / 2008)
- Yeon Gaesomun (SBS / 2006–2007)
- The Age of Heroes (MBC / 2004–2005)
- Wife (KBS2 / 2003)
- Empress Myseongseong (KBS2 / 2001–2002)
- The Aspen Tree (SBS / 2000)
- Rookie (SBS / 2000–2001)
- Encounter (KBS2 / 1999)
- Burnt Rice Teacher and Seven Potatoes (KBS2 / 1999)
- You Don't Know My Mind (MBC / 1999–2000)
- Legendary Ambition (KBS2 / 1998)
- Sea of Ambition (KBS2 / 1997)
- Tears of the Dragon (KBS1 / 1996–1998)
- Lovers (MBC / 1996)
- Jo Gwang-jo (KBS2 / 1996)
- Jang Nok-su (KBS2 / 1995)
- Way of Living: Man (SBS / 1994)
- How's Your Husband? (SBS / 1993)
- Rose Garden (SBS / 1992)
- The Three Kingdoms (KBS1 / 1992)
- Door of Solitude (SBS / 1991)
- Three-Day Promise (KBS2 / 1991)
- My Dad's Home Run (KBS2 / 1990)
- Pacheonmu (The Dance of Sky Breaking) (KBS2 / 1990)
- Half a Failure (KBS2 / 1989)
- Bond of Love (KBS2 / 1989)
- Mandate of Heaven (KBS2 / 1989)
- Joseon White Porcelain Mary Statue (KBS1 / 1988)
- Kkochimi (KBS2 / 1987)
- Yi-hwa (KBS1 / 1987)
- Sanyuhwa (KBS1 / 1987)
- Honey, I'm Sorry (KBS2 / 1986)
- Flower Ring (KBS2 / 1984)
- Geum-nam's House (KBS2 / 1983)
- Mist (KBS2 / 1983)

=== Film ===
- Marrying the Mafia 5: Return of the Family (2012)
- Sunday Punch (2011)
- Running Wild (2006)
- Who's Got the Tape? (2004)
- Hitchhiking (short film, 2004)
- Crazy First Love (2003)
- Marrying the Mafia (2002)
- Camels Don't Cry Alone (1991)
- Milk Chocolate 1950-1990 (1991)
- Sunshine at Present (1988)
- Women, Women (1985)
- The Tiger Butterfly is Lonely at Dusk (1985)
- Brother (1984)
- Kalmae-gi's Burning Passion (1983)
- Human Market: A 22-Year Old's Diary (1983)

== Theater ==
Year	Title	Role	Ref.
2022–2023	Red	Mark Rothko	

== Discography ==
- Yoo Dong-geun and Dating (1997)
- Yoo Dong-geun (1987)

== Accolades ==
=== Awards ===
- 2018 KBS Drama Awards: Daesang/Grand Prize, Best Couple (Marry Me Now)
- 2018 Korea Drama Awards: Daesang/Grand Prize (Marry Me Now)
- 2014 KBS Drama Awards: Daesang/Grand Prize (What's With This Family)
- 2008 MBC Drama Awards: Golden Acting Award, Veteran Actor (East of Eden)
- 2007 1st Korea Drama Awards: Daesang/Grand Prize (Yeon Gaesomun)
- 2002 KBS Drama Awards: Daesang/Grand Prize (Empress Myseongseong)
- 2002 23rd Blue Dragon Film Awards: Best Supporting Actor (Marrying the Mafia)
- 2002 38th Baeksang Arts Awards: Best TV Actor (Empress Myseongseong)
- 2000 36th Baeksang Arts Awards: Most Popular TV Actor (You Don't Know My Mind)
- 1998 25th Korea Broadcasting Awards: Best TV Actor (Tears of the Dragon)
- 1998 34th Baeksang Arts Awards: Best TV Actor (Tears of the Dragon)
- 1997 KBS Drama Awards: Daesang/Grand Prize (Tears of the Dragon)
- 1997 33rd Baeksang Arts Awards: Best TV Actor (Lovers)
- 1996 9th Grimae Awards: Best Actor (Lovers)
- 1995 KBS Drama Awards: Top Excellence Award, Actor (Jang Nok-su)
- 1990 KBS Drama Awards: Special Award (Pacheonmu)

=== State honors ===
Name of country, year given, and name of honor
Country	Year	Honor	Ref.
South Korea (Note: Honors are given at the Korean Popular Culture and Arts Awards, arranged by the Korea Creative Content Agency and hosted by the Ministry of Culture, Sports and Tourism. They are awarded to those who have contributed to the arts and South Korea's pop culture.)	2011	Prime Minister's Commendation	
