= First Wives' Club =

South Korean television series

- Also known as: The First Wives' Club; The Good Old Wives' Club
- Hangul: 조강지처 클럽
- Hanja: 糟糠之妻 클럽
- RR: Jogangjicheo keulleop
- MR: Chogangjich'ŏ k'ŭllŏp
- Genre: Romance; Drama
- Written by: Moon Young-nam
- Directed by: Son Jung-hyun
- Starring: Kim Hye-sun; Kim Hae-sook; Oh Hyun-kyung; Ahn Nae-sang; Lee Joon-hyuk; Son Hyun-joo
- Country of origin: South Korea
- Original language: Korean
- No. of episodes: 104

Production
- Producer: Kim Young-seob (SBS)
- Camera setup: Multi-camera
- Running time: 60 minutes
- Production company: Samhwa Networks

Original release
- Network: SBS
- Release: September 29, 2007 – October 5, 2008

First Wives' Club (Korean: 조강지처 클럽; RR: Jogangjicheo keulleop) is a 2007 South Korean drama series starring Kim Hye-sun, Kim Hae-sook, Oh Hyun-kyung, Ahn Nae-sang, Lee Joon-hyuk and Son Hyun-joo. The weekend drama aired on SBS from September 29, 2007 to October 5, 2008 on Saturdays and Sundays at 21:45 for 104 episodes.

== Cast ==
- Kim Hye-sun as Han Bok-soo
- Kim Hae-sook as Ahn Yang-soon
- Oh Hyun-kyung as Na Hwa-shin
- Oh Dae-gyu as Lee Ki-jeok (Bok-soo's husband)
- Park In-hwan as Lee Hwa-sang (Ki-jeok's father)
- Han Jin-hee as Han Shim-han (Yang-sun's husband)
- Ahn Nae-sang as Han Won-soo (Hwa-shin's husband)
- Kang Yi-seok as Chul (Won-soo and Hwa-shin's son)
- Son Hyun-joo as Gil-eok
- Byun Jung-min as Jung Na-mi (Gil-eok's wife)
- Lee Mi-young as Bok Boon-ja
- Lee Joon-hyuk as Han Sun-soo
- Yoo Ha-na as Choi Hyun-shil
- Kim Hee-jung as Mo Ji-ran
- Jang Da-yoon as Jin-joo (Ji-ran's daughter)
- Kim Ha-kyun as Mr. Kam (Ji-ran's husband)
- Lee Sang-woo as Koo Se-joo
- Kim Ae-ran as President Joo
- Yoon Joo-hee as Bang Hae-ja / Director Bang (fashion department)
- Yoo Seung-bong as Chairman Koo (Se-joo's father)
- Lee Il-hwa as Jo Yong-hee (doctor, Ki-jeok's old classmate)
- On Jo as Pan Mae-soon
- Okabe Tomoaki as Kang Go-joo
- Yoo Se-rye as Hong Bo-hae
- Son Jong-bum as Mr. Jong (Gil-eok's friend)
- Roh Joo-hyun as Mayor Choi (Hyun-shil's father)
- Hong Soon-chang as Baek Won-man (small hospital director)

== Awards and nominations ==
Year	Award	Category	Recipient	Result
2007	SBS Drama Awards	Best Supporting Actor in a Serial Drama	Oh Dae-gyu	Won
2008	2nd Korea Drama Awards	Excellence Award, Actor	Ahn Nae-sang	Nominated
2008	2nd Korea Drama Awards	Special Jury Prize	Kim Hae-sook	Won
2008	2nd Korea Drama Awards	Netizen Popularity Award	Kim Hee-jung	Won
2008	SBS Drama Awards	Top Excellence Award, Actress	Kim Hae-sook	Nominated
2008	SBS Drama Awards	Excellence Award, Actor in a Serial Drama	Ahn Nae-sang	Won
2008	SBS Drama Awards	Excellence Award, Actress in a Serial Drama	Kim Hye-sun	Won
2008	SBS Drama Awards	Excellence Award, Actress in a Serial Drama	Oh Hyun-kyung	Won
2008	SBS Drama Awards	Best Supporting Actor in a Serial Drama	Lee Sang-woo	Nominated
2008	SBS Drama Awards	Best Supporting Actress in a Serial Drama	Kim Hee-jung	Won
2008	SBS Drama Awards	Top 10 Stars	Ahn Nae-sang	Won
2008	SBS Drama Awards	Top 10 Stars	Oh Hyun-kyung	Won
2008	SBS Drama Awards	New Star Award	Lee Joon-hyuk	Won
2008	SBS Drama Awards	New Star Award	Lee Sang-woo	Won
2008	SBS Drama Awards	Achievement Award	Moon Young-nam	Won
2009	45th Baeksang Arts Awards	Best New Actor (TV)	Lee Sang-woo	Nominated

== International broadcast ==
- The series also aired in Singapore on MediaCorp Channel 8, and in the Philippines in 2010 on TV5.
