= My Kids Give Me a Headache =

2012 South Korean television series

- Promotional poster
- Hangul: 무자식 상팔자
- Hanja: 無子息 上八字
- Lit.: Childless Comfort
- RR: Mujasik sangpalja
- MR: Mujasik sangp'alcha
- Genre: Family drama
- Written by: Kim Soo-hyun
- Directed by: Jung Eul-young
- Starring: Lee Soon-jae; Kim Hae-sook; Yoo Dong-geun; Uhm Ji-won
- Composer: Gaemi
- Country of origin: South Korea
- Original language: Korean
- No. of episodes: 40

Production
- Executive producers: Ahn Je-hyun; Shin Sang-yoon
- Producers: Jo Joon-hyung; Kwon Hyuk-joon
- Production location: Korea
- Cinematography: Ji Jae-woo
- Editor: Kim Hyun-woo
- Running time: Saturdays and Sundays at 20:50 (KST)
- Production company: Samhwa Networks

Original release
- Network: jTBC
- Release: 27 October 2012 – 17 March 2013

My Kids Give Me a Headache (Korean: 무자식 상팔자) is a 2012 South Korean television series, starring Lee Soon-jae, Kim Hae-sook, Yoo Dong-geun and Uhm Ji-won. It is about three generations of the Ahn family who are all living in one house in the suburbs of Seoul, and how they deal with the societal discrimination that their smart and highly educated, eldest granddaughter faces when she becomes a single mother. It aired on cable channel jTBC from October 27, 2012 to March 17, 2013 on Saturdays and Sundays at 20:50 (KST) for 40 episodes.

The series received consistently solid ratings, and its January 26, 2013 episode reached 7.955%, breaking the previous record of Reply 1997 to become the highest viewership ratings that a drama has received on Korean cable. It went on to break its own record for the February 24 episode, with another cable drama all-time rating high of 10.715%.

== Plot ==
"My Kids Give Me a Headache" is a television series that delves into the multigenerational dynamics of a family, spanning parents, three sons, three daughters-in-law, and their children.

The narrative unfolds when the three daughters-in-law, namely Ji-Ae, Yoo-Jung, and Sae-Rom, embark on a shopping excursion to an outlet mall. During this outing, Sae-Rom stumbles upon her niece So-Young in the mall's restroom, leading to a shocking revelation. Sae-Rom discovers that So-Young, who is still unmarried, is expecting a child, evident from the size of her pregnant stomach. Faced with this unexpected news, Sae-Rom grapples with the decision of whether to disclose So-Young's pregnancy to the family, a secret So-Young implores her to keep.

== Cast ==
=== Ahn family ===
Patriarch and Matriarch

- Lee Soon-jae as Ahn Ho-shik
- Seo Woo-rim as Choi Geum-shil

First son's family

- Yoo Dong-geun as Ahn Hee-jae
- Kim Hae-sook as Lee Ji-ae
- Uhm Ji-won as Ahn So-young
- Ha Seok-jin as Ahn Sung-ki
- Lee Do-yeong as Ahn Joon-ki

Second son's family

- Song Seung-hwan as Ahn Hee-myung
- Im Ye-jin as Ji Yoo-jung
- Jung Joon as Ahn Dae-ki
- Kim Min-kyung as Kang Hyo-joo

Third son's family

- Yoon Da-hoon as Ahn Hee-gyu
- Kyeon Mi-ri as Shin Sae-rom
- Jeon Yang-ja as Shin Young-ja

=== Supporting ===
- Oh Yoon-ah as Lee Young-hyun
- Yoo Se-hyung as Min-gyu
- Son Na-eun as Oh Soo-mi
- Kim Young-jae as Kim Chang-ho

=== Special appearances ===
- Lee Sang-woo as Ha In-chul
- Kim Ji-sook as In-chul's mother
- Park Hyun-sook as In-chul's sister
- Kim Ha-kyun as barista teacher
- Joo Da-young as single mother
- Kim Kwang-kyu as gas station customer
- Kim In-kwon as Joo Jae-won (the man who went on a blind date with So-young)
- Jung Suk-young as guard
- Hwang In-young as cafe customer
- Im Hyung-joon as clothing store customer
- Lee Seon-jin as clothing store customer
- Bang Eun-hee as divorce suit client
- Jung Dong-hwan as In-chul's father in-law
- Kim Bo-yeon as Young-hyun's mother
- Han Jin-hee as Young-hyun's father
- Hong Yeo-jin as Young-hyun's aunt
- Yang Hee-kyung as Young-hyun's aunt
- Ahn Hae-sook as Young-hyun's aunt
- Cho Yeon-woo as Oh Hyun-soo, Young-hyun's friend
- Kim Ji-young as So-young's friend
- Ha Jae-sook as Sun-hwa

== International broadcast ==
- It aired in Vietnam on VTV3 from April 8, 2014 under the title Cuộc sống không con cái.
