= The Road Home (South Korean TV series) =

2009 South Korean television series

- Promotional poster
- Also known as: The Way Home; On the Way Home
- Genre: Drama, Romance, Drama
- Written by: Lee Geum-rim; Park Ji-sook
- Directed by: Moon Bo-hyun
- Starring: Lee Sang-woo; Jang Shin-young; Shim Hyung-tak; Jo Yeo-jeong; Park Hye-won; Ryohei Otani
- Country of origin: South Korea
- Original language: Korean
- No. of episodes: 120

Production
- Producer: Han Chul-kyung
- Running time: 30 minutes

Original release
- Network: KBS1
- Release: January 12 – June 26, 2009

The Road Home (Korean: 집으로 가는 길; RR: Jibeuro ganeun gil) is a South Korean daily drama starring Lee Sang-woo, Jang Shin-young, Shim Hyung-tak, Jo Yeo-jeong, Park Hye-won and Ryohei Otani. It aired on KBS1 from January 12 to June 26, 2009 on Mondays to Fridays at 20:25 for 120 episodes.

== Plot ==
A simple yet heartwarming story of a three-generation family, The Road Home portrays the love and conflicts between family members running a general hospital. It explores the lives of the grown-up children, each facing their own challenges, and how they cope with their aging parents.

Yoo Min-soo is the eldest son of the hospital's CEO. His wife, Jang Mi-ryung, bears a child out of wedlock but raises it with maternal love.

Hiro, a Japanese model, confesses his love for Ji-soo, Min-soo's sister. However, Ji-soo must later come to grips with the secrets behind her birth.

== Cast ==
Yoo family

- Lee Sang-woo as Yoo Hyun-soo
- Park Hye-won as Yoo Ji-soo (sister)
- Shim Hyung-tak as Yoo Min-soo (brother, doctor)
- Jang Yong as Yoo Yong-joon (father, doctor)
- Youn Yuh-jung as Bam Soon-jung (mother, doctor)
- Park Geun-hyung as Yoo Keon-young (the great grandfather)
- Cho Yeo-jeong as Jang Mi-ryung (Min-soo's wife)
- Yoo Yeon-mi as Yoo Eun-ji (Min-soo and Mi-ryung's daughter)
- Cha Jae-dol as Yoo Hyun (Min-soo and Mi-ryung's son)

Park family

- Im Ye-jin as Yoo Yong-sun (Hyun-soo's aunt)
- Lee Dae-yeon as Park Chil-nam (husband)
- Kim So-young as Park Shin-ae (daughter)

Han family

- Jang Shin-young as Han Suin
- Kim Yoo-ri as Han Sumi (sister)
- Choi Min-hwan as Han Joo-ho (brother)
- Han Jin-hee as Han Dae-hoon (father)
- Lee Bo-hee as Oh Seon-young (mother)

Extended cast

- Ryohei Otani as Hiro
- Ban Hyo-jung as Gook Hyo-soon (Keon-young's friend)
- Jung Jae-soon as Jang Yoon-joo
- Kim Byung-sun as Song Jin-kyung
- Yang Hee-kyung as Mi-ryung's mother
- Kim Joo-hwan as Hwang Sung-tae
- Yoo Hyung-kwan as Oh Young-gil
- Jung Soo-young as Kim Min-kyung
- Seo Hoo as Bae Hyung-tae
- Min Joon-hyun as doctor
- Lee Tae-seung as model
- Cha Ji-yeon
- Kang Cho-hee
- Lee Jin-wook (cameo, ep 21-22)

== Awards and nominations ==
Year	Award	Category	Recipient	Result
2009	KBS Drama Awards	Excellence Award, Actor in a Daily Drama	Lee Sang-woo	Nominated
2009	KBS Drama Awards	Excellence Award, Actress in a Daily Drama	Jang Shin-young	Nominated
2009	KBS Drama Awards	Best Young Actor	Choi Min-hwan	Nominated
2009	KBS Drama Awards	Best Young Actress	Kim So-young	Nominated
2009	KBS Drama Awards	Best Couple Award	Shim Hyung-tak and Cho Yeo-jeong	Nominated
2009	KBS Drama Awards	Best Couple Award	Lee Sang-woo and Jang Shin-young	Nominated
2009	KBS Drama Awards	Best Couple Award	Ryohei Otani and Park Hye-won	Nominated
