= 2008 SBS Drama Awards =

16th edition of award ceremony

- Date: December 31, 2008
- Site: SBS Open Hall, Deungchon-dong, Seoul
- Hosted by: Ryu Si-won; Han Ye-seul

Television coverage
- Network: SBS

The 2008 SBS Drama Awards is a ceremony honoring the best performances in television on the SBS network for the year 2008. It was held on December 31, 2008, at the SBS Open Hall in Deungchon-dong, Seoul, and was hosted by Ryu Si-won and Han Ye-seul.

== Nominations and winners ==
Complete list of nominees and winners:

| Grand Prize (Daesang) | Achievement Award |
|---|---|
| Moon Geun-young - Painter of the Wind as Shin Yun-bok | Moon Young-nam - First Wives' Club |
| Top Excellence Award, Actor | Top Excellence Award, Actress |
| Lee Joon-gi - Iljimae as Lee Gyeom/Iljimae; Kim Rae-won - Gourmet as Lee Sung-chan; Lee Beom-soo - On Air as Jang Ki-joon; Park Shin-yang - Painter of the Wind as Kim Hong-do | Kim Ha-neul - On Air as Oh Seung-ah; Song Yun-ah - On Air as Seo Young-eun; Kim Hae-sook - First Wives' Club as Ahn Yang-soon; Moon Geun-young - Painter of the Wind as Shin Yun-bok |
| Excellence Award, Actor in a Drama Special | Excellence Award, Actress in a Drama Special |
| Park Yong-ha - On Air as Lee Kyung-min; Bong Tae-gyu - Working Mom as Park Jae-sung; Ji Hyun-woo - My Sweet Seoul as Yoon Tae-oh; Lee Sun-kyun - My Sweet Seoul as Kim Young-soo; Song Chang-eui - The Scales of Providence as Jang Joon-ha | Choi Kang-hee - My Sweet Seoul as Oh Eun-soo; Lee Da-hae - Robber as Jin Dal-rae; Lee Young-ah - Iljimae as Bong-soon; Yum Jung-ah - Working Mom as Choi Ga-young |
| Excellence Award, Actor in a Special Planning Drama | Excellence Award, Actress in a Special Planning Drama |
| Jang Hyuk - Tazza as Kim Goni; Kim Joo-hyuk - Terroir as Kang Tae-min; Kim Min-jun - Tazza as Young-min; Kim Rae-won - Gourmet as Lee Sung-chan | Han Ye-seul - Tazza as Go Eun-sung; Han Hye-jin - Terroir as Lee Woo-joo; Kim Sa-rang - Tokyo Sun Shower as Lee Soo-jin; Nam Sang-mi - Gourmet as Kim Jin-soo |
| Excellence Award, Actor in a Serial Drama | Excellence Award, Actress in a Serial Drama |
| Ahn Nae-sang - First Wives' Club as Han Won-soo; Lee Hoon - I Am Happy as Jun-su; Lee Jin-wook - Glass Castle as Kim Joon-sung; Park Si-hoo - Family's Honor as Lee Kang-suk | Kim Hye-sun - First Wives' Club as Han Bok-soo; Oh Hyun-kyung - First Wives' Club as Na Hwa-shin; Yoon Jung-hee - Family's Honor as Ha Dan-ah; Yoon So-yi - Glass Castle as Jung Min-joo |
| Best Supporting Actor in a Drama Special | Best Supporting Actress in a Drama Special |
| Lee Moon-sik - Iljimae as Soe-dol; Ahn Gil-kang - Iljimae as Kongkal Aje; Lee Hyung-chul - On Air as Jin Sang-woo; Ryu Seung-ryong - Painter of the Wind as Kim Jo-nyun | Kim Ja-ok - Working Mom as Kim Bok-sil; Hong Ji-min - On Air as Lee Hye-kyung; Kim Sung-ryung - Iljimae as Dani; Moon Jeong-hee - My Sweet Seoul as Nam Yoo-hee |
| Best Supporting Actor in a Special Planning Drama | Best Supporting Actress in a Special Planning Drama |
| Son Hyun-joo - Tazza as Go Kwang-ryeol; Jin Goo - Tokyo Sun Shower as Park Sang-kil; Kim Kap-soo - Tazza as Agwi; Won Ki-joon - Gourmet as Gong Min-woo | Kim So-yeon - Gourmet as Yoon Joo-hee; Jo Mi-ryung - I Love You as Na Jin-hee; Kang Sung-yeon - Tazza as Madam Jeong; Kim Ae-kyung - Gourmet as Madam Jo |
| Best Supporting Actor in a Serial Drama | Best Supporting Actress in a Serial Drama |
| Lee Han-wi - Glass Castle as Son Dong-sik; Lee Kye-in - I Am Happy as Lee Cheol-kon; Lee Sang-woo - First Wives' Club as Koo Se-joo; Yoon Young-joon - Daughter-in-Law as Park Min-hyuk | Kim Hee-jung - First Wives' Club as Mo Ji-ran; Ha Joo-hee - Aquarius as Myung Eun-young; Kim Yeon-joo - Daughter-in-Law as Kim Joo-ri; Park Won-sook - Glass Castle as Yoon In-kyung |
| Producer's Award | Achievement in Production |
| Bong Tae-gyu - Working Mom as Park Jae-sung; Moon Jeong-hee - My Sweet Seoul as Nam Yoo-hee Daughter-in-Law as Lee Soon-jung | Go Dae-hwa |
| Friendship Award | Best Young Actor/Actress |
| Do Ki-seok - Iljimae | Yeo Jin-goo - Iljimae as young Lee Gyeom; Kim Yoo-jung - Painter of the Wind as young Shin Yun-bok |
| Netizen Popularity Award | Best Couple Award |
| Lee Joon-gi - Iljimae as Lee Gyeom/Iljimae; Han Ye-seul - Tazza as Go Eun-sung; Jang Hyuk - Tazza as Kim Goni, Robber as Kwon Oh-joon; Kim Ha-neul - On Air as Oh Seung-ah; Kim Rae-won - Gourmet as Lee Sung-chan; Lee Beom-soo - On Air as Jang Ki-joon; Moon Geun-young - Painter of the Wind as Shin Yun-bok; Oh Hyun-kyung - First Wives' Club as Na Hwa-shin; Park Yong-ha - On Air as Lee Kyung-min; Song Yun-ah - On Air as Seo Young-eun | Moon Geun-young and Moon Chae-won (Painter of the Wind); Ahn Nae-sang and Kim Hee-jung (First Wives' Club); Jang Hyuk and Han Ye-seul (Tazza); Ji Hyun-woo and Choi Kang-hee (My Sweet Seoul); Kim Rae-won and Nam Sang-mi (Gourmet); Lee Beom-soo and Kim Ha-neul (On Air); Lee Jin-wook and Yoon So-yi (Glass Castle); Lee Joon-gi and Han Hyo-joo (Iljimae); Oh Hyun-kyung and Lee Sang-woo (First Wives' Club); Park Yong-ha and Song Yun-ah (On Air) |

=== Top 10 Stars ===
- Ahn Nae-sang - First Wives' Club
- Han Ye-seul - Tazza
- Jang Hyuk - Tazza
- Kim Ha-neul - On Air
- Kim Rae-won - Gourmet
- Lee Joon-gi - Iljimae
- Moon Geun-young - Painter of the Wind
- Oh Hyun-kyung - First Wives' Club
- Park Yong-ha - On Air
- Song Yun-ah - On Air

=== New Star Award ===
- Bae Soo-bin - Painter of the Wind
- Cha Ye-ryun - Working Mom
- Chae Young-in - Temptation of Wife
- Ha Seok-jin - I Am Happy
- Han Hyo-joo - Iljimae
- Im Jung-eun - Aquarius
- Ji Hyun-woo - My Sweet Seoul
- Lee Joon-hyuk - First Wives' Club
- Lee Sang-woo - First Wives' Club
- Moon Chae-won - Painter of the Wind
- Yoon So-yi - Glass Castle
