= Ryohei Otani =

Japanese actor and model

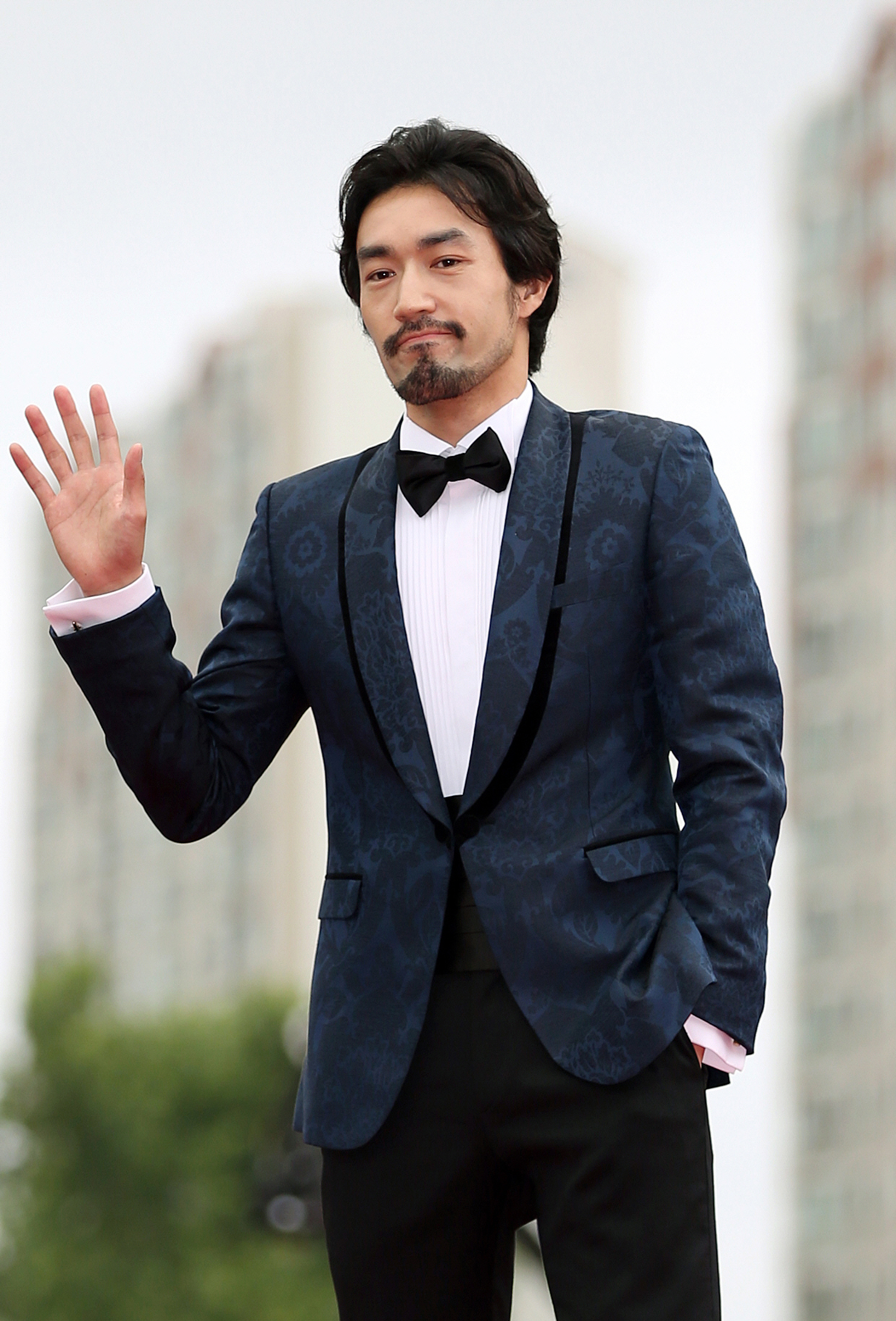
- Otani at the 18th PiFan in 2014
- Born: October 1, 1980 (age 46); Suita, Osaka, Japan
- Occupation: Actor
- Years active: 2003–present
- Agent: Mystic Actors (2015–present)

Ryohei Otani (大谷 亮平, Ōtani Ryōhei; born October 1, 1980) is a Japanese actor and model. He began his modeling career in Japan, then entered Korean entertainment by being featured in a commercial for Dunkin' Donuts in 2003, followed by Hyundai Motors, Olympus and SK Telecom. His popularity helped him land roles on television, beginning with the 2006 sitcom Soulmate. Otani's acting career continued to be active in South Korea, starring in television dramas such as The Road Home, Dear My Sister, Hero, The Chaser, and Gunman in Joseon that earned him Global Star Award in the 7th Korea Drama Awards as well as the period blockbusters War of the Arrows and The Admiral: Roaring Currents. He has currently been acting in Japan; starring in hit Japanese dramas like The Full-Time Wife Escapist as Ryota Kazami, Love Rerun as Ryosuke Sagisawa in 2018, and will be taking part in many more Japanese works later in 2018 as well.

== Filmography ==
=== Television series ===
- Soulmate (2006)
- Tokyo Sun Shower (2008)
- Matchmaker's Lover (2008) (cameo)
- The Road Home (2009)
- Dear My Sister (2012)
- Hero (OCN, 2012)
- The Chaser (2012)
- Gu Family Book (2013)
- Gunman in Joseon (2014)
- The Full-Time Wife Escapist (2016)
- Chase (2017)
- Tokyo Alice (2017)
- Love Rerun (2018)
- Manpuku (2018)
- Miss Sherlock (2018)
- No Side Manager (2019)
- Scams (2019)
- Isekai Izakaya "Nobu" (2020–22), Nobuyuki Yazawa "Taishō"
- Reach Beyond the Blue Sky (2021), Abe Masahiro
- Love You as the World Ends (2021), Daiki Hongo
- Golden Kamuy: The Hunt of Prisoners in Hokkaido / Karafuto Pursuit Arc (2024–27), Genjirō Tanigaki
- Chosen Home (2025), Yutaro Koito

=== Film ===
- War of the Arrows (2011)
- The Admiral: Roaring Currents (2014)
- Roaring Currents: The Road of the Admiral (documentary, 2015)
- When I Get Home, My Wife Always Pretends to be Dead (2018)
- Zenigata (2018)
- My Dad is a Heel Wrestler (2018)
- Yakiniku Dragon (2018), Hasegawa
- Tezuka's Barbara (2019)
- You Are Brilliant Like a Spica (2019)
- Masked Ward (2020), Kosakai
- Golden Kamuy (2024), Genjirō Tanigaki
- Stolen Identity: Final Hacking Game (2024), Kim Kang-hoon
- Hokusai's Daughter (2025), Hatsugoro
- Golden Kamuy: The Abashiri Prison Raid (2026), Genjirō Tanigaki
- A Distant Neighborhood (2026), Hiroshi Nakahara
- Three Millimeters to You (2026), Mitsuo

=== Variety show ===
- Roommate - Season 2 (SBS, 2014–2015)
- 2 Days & 1 Night - (KBS 2015)
- Cool Kiz On The Block - (KBS 2016)
- The Friends in Chiang Mai - (K-Star 2016)

=== Music video appearances ===
- Jung Yeop - "Without You" (2010)
- Tablo - "Bad" (2011)
- G.NA - "G.NA's Secret" (2014)
- Jonghyun - "End Of A Day" (2015)
- Kim Hyung Jung (singer) Big Brother Project (feat Kim BoA of Spica) - "Zero" (2015)
- Lil' Something - Chen x Heize (For SM Station Album) 2016

== Awards ==
- 2014 7th Korea Drama Awards: Global Star Award (Gunman in Joseon)
- 2019 14th Osaka Cinema Festival: Best New Actor Award (Yakiniku Dragon)
