= Han Jin-hee =

South Korean actor

- Born: March 14, 1949 (age 77); Yongin, South Korea
- Education: Yonsei University - Philosophy (dropped out)
- Occupation: Actor
- Years active: 1969–present
- Family: Jeong Ae-ran (mother-in-law)

Korean name
- Hangul: 한진희
- Hanja: 韓振熙
- RR: Han Jinhui
- MR: Han Chinhŭi

Han Jin-hee (born March 14, 1949) is a South Korean actor. He made his acting debut in 1969 and has remained active in television and film.

In 1990 he served as president of the TV Broadcasting Actors Association.

== Filmography ==
=== Film ===
- My Little Bride (2004)
- My Sassy Girl (2001)
- You Are My Ecstatic Hell (1990)
- Hwa-chun (1989)
- A Forest Where a Woman Breathes (1988)
- Frozen Sea (1987)
- Saturdays with No Nights (1986)
- The Revolt of Women (1985)
- My Love 3 (1985)
- The Winter That Year Was Warm (1984)
- Ban-no 2 (1984)
- Wife (1983)
- My Love 2 (1983)
- The Man Made to Cry by a Woman (1981)
- Freezing Point '81 (1981)
- The One I Love (1981)
- The Woman Outside the Window (1980)
- A Rose with Thorns (1979)
- The Trappings of Youth (1979)
- Portrait of a Rock (1979)
- Flame Sonata (1979)
- Byung-tae and Young-ja (1979)
- Climax (1978)
- Miss O's Apartment (1978)
- Sons for My Wife (1977)
- Target (1977)
- Cold-Hearted Days (1976)
- Excellent Guys (1974)

=== Television series ===
- Record of Youth (tvn, 2020)
- Never Twice (MBC, 2019–2020)
- Tomorrow Victory (MBC, 2015–2016)
- Remember (SBS, 2015–2016)
- Birth of a Beauty (SBS, 2014)
- Apgujeong Midnight Sun (MBC, 2014)
- High School King of Savvy (tvN, 2014)
- Jang Bo-ri Is Here! (MBC, 2014)
- Thrice Married Woman (SBS, 2013)
- Two Women's Room (SBS, 2013)
- Pots of Gold (MBC, 2013)
- Cheongdam-dong Alice (SBS, 2012)
- Here Comes Mr. Oh (MBC, 2012)
- Missing You (MBC, 2012)
- My Kids Give Me a Headache (jTBC, 2012)
- You're Here, You're Here, You're Really Here (MBN, 2011)
- Bride of the Sun (SBS, 2011)
- The Greatest Love (MBC, 2011)
- New Tales of Gisaeng (SBS, 2011)
- The King of Legend (KBS1, 2010)
- Gloria (MBC, 2010)
- Life Is Beautiful (SBS, 2010)
- Temptation of an Angel (SBS, 2009)
- Assorted Gems (MBC, 2009)
- Green Coach (SBS, 2009)
- The Road Home (KBS2, 2009)
- The Kingdom of the Winds (KBS2, 2008)
- Aeja's Older Sister, Minja (SBS, 2008)
- Even So Love (MBC, 2007)
- First Wives' Club (SBS, 2007)
- Heaven & Earth (KBS1, 2007)
- Queen of the Game (SBS, 2006)
- KBS TV Novel: Sunok (KBS1, 2006)
- Hearts of Nineteen (KBS1, 2006)
- End of Love (MBC, 2006)
- Autumn Shower (MBC, 2005)
- Goodbye to Sadness (KBS2, 2005)
- Green Rose (SBS, 2005)
- Lotus Flower Fairy (MBC, 2004)
- Island Village Teacher (SBS, 2004)
- Terms of Endearment (KBS2, 2004)
- One Million Roses (KBS1, 2003)
- Rose Fence (KBS2, 2003)
- On the Green Prairie (KBS2, 2003)
- To Be With You (KBS1, 2002)
- Golden Carriage (MBC, 2002)
- Who's My Love (KBS2, 2002)
- We Are Dating Now (SBS, 2002)
- Mina (KBS2, 2001)
- This Is Love (KBS1, 2001)
- Rules of Marriage (MBC, 2001)
- Hotelier (MBC, 2001)
- Stock Flower (KBS2, 2001)
- Flower Garden (KBS2, 2001)
- Foolish Love (KBS2, 2000)
- The More You Love (MBC, 2000)
- The Aspen Tree (SBS, 2000)
- Did You Really Love (KBS2, 1999)
- Beautiful Choice (MBC, 1999)
- Who Are You (SBS, 1999)
- My Love by My Side (KBS1, 1998)
- I Love You, I'm Sorry (KBS2, 1998)
- Legend of Ambition (KBS2, 1998)
- Lie (KBS2, 1998)
- I Love You! I Love You! (SBS, 1998)
- Miari No. 1 (SBS, 1997)
- Because I Love You (SBS, 1997)
- Happiness Is in Our Hearts (SBS, 1997)
- Propose (KBS2, 1997)
- A Bluebird Has It (KBS2, 1997)
- Dad is the Boss (SBS, 1996)
- Power of Love (MBC, 1996)
- Sometimes Like Strangers (SBS, 1996)
- Mornings at a Park in Paris (KBS2, 1996)
- Reasons For Not Getting Divorced (MBC, 1996)
- Your Voice (SBS, 1995)
- Even if the Wind Blows (KBS1, 1995)
- Matsu (MBC, 1994)
- Farewell (SBS, 1994)
- Love and Farewell (KBS2, 1993)
- Deputy (KBS1, 1992)
- And Shaky Times (KBS2, 1991)
- The Love Song of Lethe (KBS2, 1991)
- Beyond the Mountains (MBC, 1991)
- Mongshil (MBC, 1990)
- The Sinner We Love (KBS2, 1990)
- Tree Blooming with Love (KBS2, 1990)
- Copper Ring (KBS2, 1990)
- Endless Love (KBS2, 1989)
- Half a Failure (KBS2, 1989)
- The 5th Row (MBC, 1989)
- The 7th Ward (KBS2, 1988)
- Others (KBS2, 1987)
- Time (KBS1, 1987)
- Gilson (KBS2, 1986)
- My Heart Is Like a Star (KBS2, 1986)
- Stars on the Prairie (KBS2, 1986)
- The Youth (KBS2, 1985)
- Guest House (KBS2, 1984)
- Family (KBS2, 1984)
- Burning Sea (KBS1, 1984)
- A Twist on the Tale of Chunhyang (KBS2, 1984)
- Mom is Busy (KBS2, 1983)
- Thaw (KBS2, 1983)
- Soul Mates (KBS2, 1982)
- Fantasy Horror (KBS2, 1981)
- Covenant (TBC, 1977)
- Wedding March (TBC, 1976)
- Eldest Daughter-in-law (TBC, 1976)
- Jade Flute (TBC, 1975)
- Mihwa (TBC, 1975)
- Detective (TBC, 1975)
- Mother (TBC, 1974)

== Theater ==
- Love Letters (2006)

== Radio program ==
- Music Album (KBS Cool FM)

== Awards ==
- 2013 MBC Drama Awards: Lifetime Achievement Award (Pots of Gold)
- 2006 8th KBS Right Language Awards: Special Award
- 1979 Theater, Film and TV Arts Awards: Popularity Award
- 1977 13th Baeksang Arts Awards: Best Actor (Daughter-in-law)
- 1976 TBC Drama Awards
- 1975 TBC Drama Awards
