= Life Is Beautiful (South Korean TV series) =

2010 South Korean television series

- Promotional poster
- Also known as: Beautiful Life
- Hangul: 인생은 아름다워
- Hanja: 人生은 아름다워
- RR: Insaengeun areumdawo
- MR: Insaengŭn arŭmdawŏ
- Genre: Romance; Drama; Family
- Written by: Kim Soo-hyun
- Directed by: Jung Eul-young
- Starring: Song Chang-eui; Lee Sang-woo; Lee Sang-yoon; Nam Sang-mi
- Country of origin: South Korea
- Original language: Korean
- No. of episodes: 63

Production
- Executive producer: Choi Jang-won
- Producers: Kim Yong-jin; Park In-taek
- Running time: 60 minutes
- Production companies: SBS Plus; Samhwa Networks

Original release
- Network: SBS TV
- Release: 20 March – 7 November 2010

Life Is Beautiful (Korean: 인생은 아름다워) is a 2010 South Korean television series starring Song Chang-eui, Lee Sang-woo, Lee Sang-yoon and Nam Sang-mi. It aired on SBS TV from March 20 to November 7, 2010 on Saturdays and Sundays at 21:45 for 63 episodes.

Aside from scoring high ratings that were in the mid-twenty range during its run, the series is notable for its sensitive portrayal of a loving, openly gay couple in a Korean drama on primetime network television. Although the approach to homosexual themes is quite sympathetic, it has been argued that "major changes in the last episodes of 'Life is Beautiful' were made due to the strong opposition towards the issue," and that there are "no kissing scenes between the main actors in 'Life is Beautiful' in the midst of endless kissing scenes in other K-dramas that depict heterosexual couples."

== Plot ==
Set in Jeju, the drama revolves around a loving, multi-generation family led by the parents Yang Byung-tae (Kim Yeong-cheol) and Kim Min-jae (Kim Hae-sook), and their four children Tae-sub (Song Chang-eui), Ji-hye (Woo Hee-jin), Ho-sub (Lee Sang-yoon) and Cho-rong (Nam Gyu-ri), as well as assorted grandparents and uncles. The story follows the family's everyday lives and conflicts, including oldest daughter Ji-hye's marital problems with her husband Soo-il (Lee Min-woo); younger son Ho-sub's pursuit of his mother's assistant, Yeon-joo (Nam Sang-mi); and oldest son Tae-sub's romantic pairing with divorced professor Kyung-soo (Lee Sang-woo), whose homosexual relationship their families react to while addressing issues of personal, social, and familial acceptance, leading to, finally, love and understanding.

== Cast ==
Yang family

- Kim Yong-rim as Byung-tae's mother
- Choi Jung-hoon as Byung-tae's father
- Kim Yeong-cheol as Yang Byung-tae
- Kim Hae-sook as Kim Min-jae
- Kim Sang-joong as Yang Byung-joon
- Yoon Da-hoon as Yang Byung-kil
- Song Chang-eui as Yang Tae-sub
- Lee Sang-yoon as Yang Ho-sub
- Nam Gyu-ri as Yang Cho-rong

Lee family

- Lee Min-woo as Lee Soo-il
- Woo Hee-jin as Yang Ji-hye
- Jung Da-bin as Lee Ji-na

Park family

- Lee Sang-hoon as Mr. Park
- Jo Mi-ryung as Yang Soo-ja
- Kang Yi-seok as son

Extended cast

- Chang Mi-hee as Jo Ah-ra
- Nam Sang-mi as Boo Yeon-joo
- Lee Sang-woo as Kim Kyung-soo
- Yoo Min as Chae-young
- Kim Woo-hyun as Hyun-jin
- Lee Kyun as Dong-geun
- Bang Eun-hee as Jo Nam-shik
- Im Ye-jin as Ji-hye's aunt (cameo)
- Han Jin-hee as Min-jae's ex-husband (cameo)
- Kim Jung-hwa as Woo Geum-ji (cameo)

== Awards and nominations ==
Year	Award	Category	Recipient	Result	Ref.
2010	3rd Korea Drama Awards	Best Drama	Life Is Beautiful	Nominated	
2010	3rd Korea Drama Awards	Best Supporting Actress	Kim Hae-sook	Won	
2010	SBS Drama Awards	Top Excellence Award, Actor in a Weekend/Daily Drama	Kim Yeong-cheol	Nominated	
2010	SBS Drama Awards	Top Excellence Award, Actress in a Weekend/Daily Drama	Kim Yong-rim	Nominated	
2010	SBS Drama Awards	Excellence Award, Actor in a Weekend/Daily Drama	Song Chang-eui	Won	
2010	SBS Drama Awards	Best Supporting Actor in a Weekend/Daily Drama	Yoon Da-hoon	Nominated	
2010	SBS Drama Awards	Best Supporting Actress in a Weekend/Daily Drama	Nam Sang-mi	Nominated	
2010	SBS Drama Awards	New Star Award	Nam Gyu-ri	Won	
2011	47th Baeksang Arts Awards	Best Director (TV)	Jung Eul-yong	Nominated	
2011	47th Baeksang Arts Awards	Best New Actress (TV)	Nam Gyu-ri	Nominated	

== Episode ratings ==
Date	Episode	Seoul Area	Nationwide
2010-03-20	1	12.3% (10th)	12.5% (9th)
2010-03-21	2	12.6% (10th)	12.2% (10th)
2010-03-27	3	14.3% (7th)	15.1% (7th)
2010-03-28	4	14.8% (7th)	15.2% (7th)
2010-04-03	5	15.2% (5th)	15.6% (3rd)
2010-04-04	6	16.0% (4th)	17.2% (3rd)
2010-04-10	7	17.9% (4th)	19.0% (4th)
2010-04-11	8	16.9% (4th)	17.6% (4th)
2010-04-17	9	15.7% (3rd)	16.8% (3rd)
2010-04-18	10	16.4% (3rd)	17.6% (3rd)
2010-04-24	11	17.3% (4th)	18.1% (4th)
2010-04-25	12	17.9% (3rd)	18.9% (3rd)
2010-05-01	13	17.5% (3rd)	19.2% (3rd)
2010-05-02	14	17.9% (4th)	18.6% (4th)
2010-05-08	15	17.2% (3rd)	17.9% (3rd)
2010-05-09	16	18.5% (4th)	19.3% (4th)
2010-05-15	17	14.4% (2nd)	14.9% (2nd)
2010-05-16	18	17.6% (4th)	18.3% (4th)
2010-05-22	19	18.0% (4th)	18.9% (4th)
2010-05-23	20	18.6% (4th)	19.3% (4th)
2010-05-29	21	21.8% (3rd)	22.1% (3rd)
2010-05-30	22	17.9% (6th)	18.5% (6th)
2010-06-05	23	19.7% (4th)	20.1% (4th)
2010-06-06	24	20.3% (4th)	21.2% (4th)
2010-06-27	25	17.6% (3rd)	18.0% (3rd)
2010-07-03	26	17.5% (2nd)	18.1% (2nd)
2010-07-04	27	20.3% (2nd)	21.0% (2nd)
2010-07-10	28	19.6% (3rd)	20.6% (3rd)
2010-07-11	29	20.9% (4th)	21.4% (2nd)
2010-07-17	30	21.7% (3rd)	22.5% (3rd)
2010-07-18	31	21.5% (3rd)	21.6% (3rd)
2010-07-24	32	20.0% (3rd)	20.5% (2nd)
2010-07-25	33	21.2% (3rd)	21.7% (3rd)
2010-07-31	34	20.1% (1st)	20.4% (2nd)
2010-08-01	35	19.7% (4th)	20.0% (4th)
2010-08-07	36	20.1% (4th)	20.6% (3rd)
2010-08-08	37	20.2% (4th)	20.7% (4th)
2010-08-14	38	21.8% (3rd)	22.2% (3rd)
2010-08-15	39	21.9% (4th)	21.6% (4th)
2010-08-21	40	22.3% (2nd)	22.6% (3rd)
2010-08-22	41	22.1% (4th)	23.0% (4th)
2010-08-28	42	22.5% (2nd)	23.1% (2nd)
2010-08-29	43	22.7% (4th)	23.5% (4th)
2010-09-04	44	22.8% (2nd)	23.9% (1st)
2010-09-05	45	23.3% (4th)	23.9% (3rd)
2010-09-11	46	22.7% (2nd)	23.3% (2nd)
2010-09-12	47	23.9% (4th)	24.5% (3rd)
2010-09-18	48	23.6% (2nd)	24.6% (2nd)
2010-09-19	49	23.4% (3rd)	24.2% (3rd)
2010-09-25	50	21.3% (3rd)	22.2% (3rd)
2010-09-26	51	25.7% (3rd)	26.5% (3rd)
2010-10-02	52	20.7% (2nd)	20.9% (2nd)
2010-10-03	53	20.5% (4th)	20.7% (4th)
2010-10-09	54	18.9% (3rd)	19.5% (4th)
2010-10-10	55	19.4% (4th)	19.6% (5th)
2010-10-16	56	19.7% (2nd)	19.8% (2nd)
2010-10-17	57	20.3% (4th)	21.0% (4th)
2010-10-23	58	18.6% (3rd)	19.2% (3rd)
2010-10-24	59	20.1% (3rd)	20.1% (2nd)
2010-10-30	60	20.0% (3rd)	20.8% (3rd)
2010-10-31	61	20.0% (4th)	20.3% (4th)
2010-11-06	62	17.0% (2nd)	17.5% (2nd)
2010-11-07	63	20.6% (3rd)	21.3% (3rd)
Average		19.4%	-

Source: TNS Media Korea

== International broadcast ==
It aired on Japan's cable channel KNTV under the title Beautiful Life, beginning February 24, 2011.

It aired in Thailand on True4U beginning November 18, 2015.

== See also ==
- LGBT rights in South Korea
