= Goddess of Marriage =

2013 South Korean romantic comedy-drama series

- Promotional poster
- Genre: Romance; Comedy; Drama
- Written by: Jo Jung-sun
- Directed by: Oh Jin-suk
- Starring: Nam Sang-mi; Lee Sang-woo; Kim Ji-hoon
- Composer: Oh Joon-seong
- Country of origin: South Korea
- Original language: Korean
- No. of episodes: 36

Production
- Executive producer: Han Jung-hwan
- Producers: Park Young-soo; Lee Hee-soo
- Production company: Samhwa Networks

Original release
- Network: SBS TV
- Release: 29 June – 3 November 2013

Goddess of Marriage (Korean: 결혼의 여신; RR: Gyeolhonui yeosin) is a 2013 South Korean romantic comedy-drama series starring Nam Sang-mi, Kim Ji-hoon, Lee Sang-woo, Lee Tae-ran, Kim Jung-tae, Jo Min-su, Kwon Hae-hyo, Jang Young-nam and Jang Hyun-sung. It premiered on SBS on June 29, 2013, and ended on November 3, 2013, airing every Saturday and Sunday at 21:50 for 36 episodes.

== Plot ==
The drama explores modern love, life as a career woman, and the meaning of marriage as experienced by four couples.

== Cast ==
- Nam Sang-mi as Song Ji-hye

A radio writer who's assertive, but dreams of a sweet, pure love. She becomes caught in a love triangle between two men, which makes her question the romantic ideal versus the reality of marriage.

- Lee Sang-woo as Kim Hyun-woo

An architect. He suddenly appears in Ji-hye's life and seems to be her soulmate.

- Kim Ji-hoon as Kang Tae-wook

A prosecutor from a wealthy family. Ji-hye's longtime boyfriend.

- Lee Tae-ran as Hong Hye-jung

She used to work as a television announcer, and is now a mother of two and a "Cheongdam-dong daughter-in-law" (a stylish young married women of the upper crust living in that wealthy neighborhood).

- Kim Jung-tae as Kang Tae-jin

Married to Hye-jung. Tae-wook's older brother.

- Jo Min-su as Song Ji-sun

A "Supermom" who works while raising three children. Ji-hye's older sister.

- Kwon Hae-hyo as Noh Jang-soo

He and Ji-sun got married when he got her pregnant. Jang-soo is a kind and meek husband who is overpowered by his wife's strong energy and can't raise his voice.

- Jang Young-nam as Kwon Eun-hee

She tries so hard to meet her husband's exacting standards on what constitutes a "good wife."

- Jang Hyun-sung as Noh Seung-soo

Married to Eun-hee. He is having an affair with his colleague Cynthia.

- Jeon Guk-hwan as Kang Man-ho

Tae-wook and Tae-jin's father.

- Yoon So-jung as Lee Jung-sook

Tae-wook and Tae-jin's mother.

- Baek Il-seob as Song Nam-gil

Ji-hye and Ji-sun's father.

- Kim Ki-chun as Noh Hee-bong

Jang-soo's father.

- Sung Byung-sook as Byun Ae-ja

Jang-soo's mother.

- Kim Mi-kyung as Hyun-woo's mother
- Yeon Woon-kyung as Hye-jung's mother
- Lee Se-young as Noh Min-jung

Ji-sun and Jang-soo's daughter.

- Yang Han-yeol as Noh Chang-ho

Eun-hee's son

- Kim Joon-goo as Kim Ye-sol
- Shim Yi-young as Nam Mi-ra

She seduces Tae-jin.

- Park Wan-kyu as Jung Dae-hyun

Yeon-soo's husband.

- Lee Seol-hee as Kim Yeon-soo

Ji-hye's friend.

- Clara Lee as Cynthia Jung

Anchorwoman of KoreaTV, and Seung-soo's lover.

- Yeom Dong-heon as Managing director Hwang
- Go Na-eun as Han Se-kyung
- Park Joon-geum as Han Se-kyeong's mother
- Jo Woo-jin as the husband of Hye-jung's younger sister
- Kwak Hee-sung as Pil-ho
- Son Woo-hyuk

== Ratings ==
In the tables below, the blue numbers represent the lowest ratings and the red numbers represent the highest ratings.

Episode #	Original broadcast date	Average audience share			
Episode #	Original broadcast date	TNmS Ratings		AGB Nielsen	
Episode #	Original broadcast date	Nationwide	Seoul National Capital Area	Nationwide	Seoul National Capital Area
1	June 29, 2013	9.2% (8th)	11.5% (6th)	9.1% (8th)	9.6% (7th)
2	June 30, 2013	7.8% (14th)	9.6% (11th)	8.0% (15th)	8.7% (14th)
3	July 6, 2013	8.7% (9th)	10.0% (8th)	8.4% (15th)	8.8% (13th)
4	July 7, 2013	7.6% (18th)	9.4% (13th)	8.7% (15th)	9.1% (14th)
5	July 13, 2013	9.0% (10th)	10.8% (8th)	9.1% (14th)	9.6% (13th)
6	July 14, 2013	8.5% (16th)	11.1% (11th)	9.2% (14th)	10.7% (12th)
7	July 20, 2013	9.2% (10th)	10.6% (7th)	8.8% (12th)	10.1% (10th)
8	July 21, 2013	8.6% (14th)	10.5% (10th)	9.1% (14th)	9.5% (16th)
9	July 27, 2013	9.4% (7th)	11.2% (5th)	9.7% (8th)	11.0% (8th)
10	July 28, 2013	8.4% (16th)	9.7% (13th)	8.5% (14th)	9.0% (13th)
11	August 3, 2013	9.2% (10th)	11.0% (6th)	8.6% (11th)	8.9% (10th)
12	August 4, 2013	7.7% (19th)	9.0% (13th)	8.2% (15th)	9.4% (9th)
13	August 10, 2013	9.9% (8th)	10.2% (9th)	11.0% (6th)	12.5% (5th)
14	August 11, 2013	8.6% (12th)	10.2% (11th)	9.6% (9th)	10.3% (7th)
15	August 17, 2013	10.8% (8th)	11.9% (5th)	10.0% (7th)	10.6% (7th)
16	August 18, 2013	9.3% (11th)	11.1% (9th)	9.1% (11th)	10.0% (11th)
17	August 24, 2013	9.3% (12th)	10.8% (7th)	9.4% (10th)	10.0% (7th)
18	August 25, 2013	9.1% (13th)	10.4% (10th)	9.7% (9th)	10.5% (7th)
19	August 31, 2013	10.2% (8th)	11.3% (7th)	11.1% (6th)	12.7% (6th)
20	September 1, 2013	9.4% (11th)	11.3% (7th)	9.7% (8th)	10.3% (7th)
21	September 7, 2013	10.3% (7th)	12.1% (5th)	9.3% (8th)	10.6% (7th)
22	September 8, 2013	9.7% (9th)	11.7% (8th)	9.2% (10th)	9.5% (11th)
23	September 14, 2013	10.1% (11th)	11.7% (8th)	11.2% (7th)	11.8% (6th)
24	September 15, 2013	10.6% (8th)	13.5% (6th)	10.5% (9th)	11.1% (8th)
25	September 21, 2013	10.4% (8th)	13.1% (4th)	11.2% (8th)	11.9% (7th)
26	September 22, 2013	9.8% (11th)	11.4% (9th)	11.0% (9th)	11.3% (7th)
27	September 28, 2013	10.7% (8th)	12.9% (6th)	11.4% (5th)	12.1% (5th)
28	September 29, 2013	11.6% (9th)	13.5% (8th)	12.3% (8th)	13.2% (7th)
29	October 5, 2013	8.8% (10th)	10.4% (6th)	12.7% (4th)	13.3% (5th)
30	October 6, 2013	9.9% (9th)	12.2% (7th)	11.2% (6th)	12.2% (7th)
31	October 12, 2013	14.2% (3rd)	17.9% (3rd)	13.9% (4th)	14.9% (4th)
32	October 13, 2013	10.4% (7th)	12.6% (5th)	12.0% (6th)	12.7% (6th)
33	October 19, 2013	11.3% (6th)	14.6% (4th)	11.5% (5th)	12.3% (5th)
34	October 20, 2013	10.7% (7th)	13.0% (6th)	10.4% (8th)	11.2% (8th)
35	October 26, 2013	11.7% (6th)	14.5% (4th)	12.7% (5th)	13.8% (4th)
36	October 27, 2013	11.3% (7th)	13.4% (5th)	11.7% (6th)	12.2% (6th)
Average		9.8%	11.7%	10.2%	11.0%

== Awards and nominations ==
Year	Award	Category	Recipient	Result
2013	6th Korea Drama Awards	Hot Star Award	Clara	Won
2013	2nd APAN Star Awards	Acting Award, Actress	Jang Young-nam	Nominated
2013	SBS Drama Awards	Top Excellence Award, Actress in a Weekend/Daily Drama	Nam Sang-mi	Won
2013	SBS Drama Awards	Excellence Award, Actor in a Weekend/Daily Drama	Kim Ji-hoon	Won
2013	SBS Drama Awards	Excellence Award, Actor in a Weekend/Daily Drama	Lee Sang-woo	Nominated
2013	SBS Drama Awards	Special Award, Actor in a Weekend/Daily Drama	Jang Hyun-sung	Won
2013	SBS Drama Awards	Special Award, Actress in a Weekend/Daily Drama	Jang Young-nam	Won
2013	SBS Drama Awards	Special Award, Actress in a Weekend/Daily Drama	Yoon So-jung	Nominated
2013	SBS Drama Awards	Top 10 Stars	Nam Sang-mi	Won
