= All About My Mom =

2015 South Korean television series

- Promotional poster
- Hangul: 부탁해요, 엄마
- RR: Butakhaeyo, eomma
- MR: Put'akhaeyo, ŏmma
- Genre: Melodrama; Family
- Written by: Yoon Kyung-ah
- Directed by: Lee Gun-joon
- Starring: Eugene; Lee Sang-woo
- Country of origin: South Korea
- Original language: Korean
- No. of episodes: 54

Production
- Executive producers: Jung Sung-hyo; Yoon Chang-bum; Lee Jae-gil
- Producers: Jo Woong; Yoon Jae-hyuk
- Running time: 80 minutes
- Production companies: Hidden Picture Media; KBS Media

Original release
- Network: KBS2
- Release: August 15, 2015 – February 14, 2016

All About My Mom (Korean: 부탁해요, 엄마; RR: Butakhaeyo, eomma; lit. 'Please, Mom') is a 2015 South Korean television series starring Eugene and Lee Sang-woo. It aired on KBS2 from August 15, 2015, to February 14, 2016, every Saturday and Sunday at 19:55 (KST).

== Synopsis ==
Jin-ae (Eugene) works hard to make money only to end up spending it on her family, and her mother San-ok shows so much affection towards her first son only. Jin-ae then meets Kang Hoon-jae (Lee Sang-woo), who coincidentally is the son of her boss whom she admires, and marries him. While experiencing difficult times with her mother-in-law, Jin-ae begins to understand her own mother for the first time.

== Cast ==
=== Main ===
- Eugene as Lee Jin-ae
- Lee Sang-woo as Kang Hoon-jae

=== Supporting ===
==== Lee Jin-ae's family ====
- Go Doo-shim as Im San-ok
- Kim Kap-soo as Lee Dong-chul
- Oh Min-suk as Lee Hyung-kyu
- Choi Tae-joon as Lee Hyung-soon

==== Kang Hoon-jae's family ====
- Kim Mi-sook as Hwang Young-sun
- Hwang Jung-min as Yeom Nan-sook

==== Sun Hye-joo's family ====
- Son Yeo-eun as Sun Hye-joo
- Nam Gi-ae as Hong Yoo-ja
- Gil Jung-woo as Kim San

==== Jang Chul-woong's family ====
- Song Seung-hwan as Jang Chul-woong
  - Jang Seung-jo as young Chul-woong
- Jo Bo-ah as Jang Chae-ri
- Kim Young-ok as Song Ki-nam

=== Extended ===
- Song Jong-ho as Yoon Sang-hyuk
- Kwon Mina as Go Aeng-doo
- Kim Sun-woong as Min-sun
- Chae So-young as Shin Yoo-hee
- Tae Hang-ho as Park Kye-tae
- Min Ji-ah as Son Yoo-kyung
- Susanna Noh as Gong Na-ri
- Yang Joo-ho as Lawyer Hwang
- Jung Eun-pyo as Manager Yang
- Kim Ji-eun as Hong-do
- Lee Si-won as Yoo Ji-yeon
- Yoon Hee-seok as Song Joon-young
- Lee Jin-kwon as Supporting
- Jang In-sub as Shin Jae-min

=== Cameo appearances ===
- Kim Jun-hyun as President Kim

== Ratings ==
In the table below, the blue numbers represent the lowest ratings and the red numbers represent the highest ratings.

Episode #	Original broadcast date	Average audience share			
Episode #	Original broadcast date	TNmS Ratings		AGB Nielsen Ratings	
Episode #	Original broadcast date	Nationwide	Seoul National Capital Area	Nationwide	Seoul National Capital Area
1	15 August 2015	14.1%	13.2%	14.9%	15.7%
2	16 August 2015	22.7%	22.3%	24.3%	24.5%
3	22 August 2015	17.0%	16.2%	17.3%	16.8%
4	23 August 2015	19.5%	18.2%	20.5%	20.5%
5	29 August 2015	19.8%	18.6%	19.9%	20.4%
6	30 August 2015	21.3%	20.6%	22.5%	22.8%
7	5 September 2015	21.0%	20.1%	21.9%	21.9%
8	6 September 2015	24.0%	23.0%	26.5%	26.8%
9	12 September 2015	21.7%	20.3%	22.2%	21.7%
10	13 September 2015	25.7%	23.7%	26.6%	26.2%
11	19 September 2015	21.5%	20.2%	22.5%	22.5%
12	20 September 2015	26.2%	25.7%	27.0%	27.6%
13	26 September 2015	19.5%	18.3%	20.1%	21.0%
14	27 September 2015	20.3%	18.9%	20.6%	20.4%
15	3 October 2015	22.0%	19.9%	23.2%	23.6%
16	4 October 2015	26.4%	24.1%	28.3%	29.0%
17	10 October 2015	23.5%	21.7%	24.2%	24.1%
18	11 October 2015	23.5%	23.2%	26.3%	27.2%
19	17 October 2015	23.3%	22.4%	24.0%	23.9%
20	18 October 2015	27.9%	26.2%	29.4%	29.4%
21	24 October 2015	24.3%	23.7%	26.7%	27.9%
22	25 October 2015	28.2%	28.1%	30.3%	31.7%
23	31 October 2015	24.9%	23.5%	24.5%	24.6%
24	1 November 2015	28.0%	26.8%	29.2%	30.3%
25	7 November 2015	24.2%	22.3%	27.0%	26.7%
26	8 November 2015	27.3%	25.5%	31.1%	31.3%
27	14 November 2015	22.7%	21.4%	23.7%	24.1%
28	15 November 2015	27.3%	24.8%	29.5%	29.6%
29	21 November 2015	19.4%	18.0%	22.4%	23.2%
30	22 November 2015	29.1%	28.4%	30.7%	31.3%
31	28 November 2015	21.4%	20.5%	24.7%	25.1%
32	29 November 2015	27.2%	26.4%	30.9%	31.7%
33	5 December 2015	22.0%	21.0%	25.2%	26.0%
34	6 December 2015	28.2%	28.1%	31.7%	33.3%
35	12 December 2015	22.0%	20.3%	24.2%	24.3%
36	13 December 2015	27.7%	25.5%	32.1%	33.1%
37	19 December 2015	21.3%	19.8%	25.7%	25.9%
38	20 December 2015	26.7%	25.5%	32.4%	33.4%
39	26 December 2015	22.9%	20.6%	26.2%	27.6%
40	27 December 2015	26.2%	24.5%	32.1%	32.8%
41	2 January 2016	25.2%	22.8%	27.6%	28.1%
42	3 January 2016	28.2%	26.1%	33.3%	34.1%
43	9 January 2016	25.8%	23.1%	27.3%	30.8%
44	10 January 2016	32.6%	30.2%	33.8%	34.8%
45	16 January 2016	27.6%	25.4%	28.0%	28.5%
46	17 January 2016	35.6%	33.6%	35.8%	36.0%
47	23 January 2016	31.9%	29.2%	32.4%	34.0%
48	24 January 2016	37.1%	33.3%	36.9%	38.0%
49	30 January 2016	32.9%	29.1%	33.4%	34.0%
50	31 January 2016	35.9%	32.8%	36.3%	37.7%
51	6 February 2016	33.3%	29.6%	33.2%	33.2%
52	7 February 2016	33.5%	31.8%	31.1%	31.1%
53	13 February 2016	34.3%	31.8%	35.5%	35.6%
54	14 February 2016	39.1%	36.6%	38.2%	39.0%
Average		25.8%	24.2%	27.5%	28%

== Awards and nominations ==
Year	Award	Category	Recipient	Result
2015	4th APAN Star Awards	Excellence Award, Actor in a Serial Drama	Lee Sang-woo	Nominated
2015	4th APAN Star Awards	Excellence Award, Actress in a Serial Drama	Eugene	Nominated
2015	4th APAN Star Awards	Best Dressed	Oh Min-suk	Won
2015	28th Grimae Awards	Best New Actress	Jo Bo-ah	Won
2015	29th KBS Drama Awards	Grand Prize (Daesang)	Go Doo-shim	Won
2015	29th KBS Drama Awards	Top Excellence Award, Actress	Go Doo-shim	Nominated
2015	29th KBS Drama Awards	Excellence Award, Actor in a Serial Drama	Kim Kap-soo	Won
2015	29th KBS Drama Awards	Excellence Award, Actor in a Serial Drama	Lee Sang-woo	Nominated
2015	29th KBS Drama Awards	Excellence Award, Actress in a Serial Drama	Eugene	Won
2015	29th KBS Drama Awards	Excellence Award, Actress in a Serial Drama	Go Doo-shim	Nominated
2015	29th KBS Drama Awards	Best Supporting Actor	Oh Min-suk	Nominated
2015	29th KBS Drama Awards	Best Supporting Actress	Son Yeo-eun	Nominated
2015	29th KBS Drama Awards	Popularity Award, Actress	Jo Bo-ah	Won
2015	29th KBS Drama Awards	Best New Actress	Jo Bo-ah	Nominated
2015	29th KBS Drama Awards	Best New Actor	Choi Tae-joon	Nominated
2015	29th KBS Drama Awards	Best Young Actor	Gil Jung-woo	Nominated
2015	29th KBS Drama Awards	Best Couple Award	Lee Sang-woo and Eugene	Nominated
2015	29th KBS Drama Awards	Best Couple Award	Oh Min-suk and Son Yeo-eun	Nominated
2015	29th KBS Drama Awards	Best Couple Award	Choi Tae-joon and Jo Bo-ah	Nominated

== Remake ==
- Vietnam - This series is remade in Vietnam as Giấc mơ của mẹ, aired on government-owned HTV2 and VieOn on July 4, 2022.
