= Marry Me Now =

South Korean TV series

- Promotional poster
- Hangul: 같이 살래요
- Lit.: Shall We Live Together
- RR: Gachi sallaeyo
- MR: Kach'i sallaeyo
- Genre: Family; Melodrama
- Created by: KBS Drama Division
- Written by: Park Pil-joo
- Directed by: Yoon Chang-beom
- Starring: Han Ji-hye; Lee Sang-woo
- Country of origin: South Korea
- Original language: Korean
- No. of episodes: 50 (Note: This series is the final KBS series to air hour-length episodes, following a repacking of episodes in subsequent dramas and in accordance with the other drama time-slots.)

Production
- Executive producer: Kim Seong-geun → Hwang Eui-kyung (KBS Drama Management Team)
- Producers: Lee-ho; Lee Young-seop; Kim Gil-woong
- Camera setup: Single-camera
- Running time: 80 min
- Production company: GnG Production

Original release
- Network: KBS2
- Release: March 17 – September 9, 2018

Marry Me Now (Korean: 같이 살래요; RR: Gachi sallaeyo) is a 2018 South Korean television series starring Han Ji-hye and Lee Sang-woo. The series aired on KBS2 from March 17 to September 9, 2018.

== Synopsis ==
The drama centers around a balanced, multigenerational family.

Park Hyo-seob, is a widower and a compassionate father to his four children: Park Sun-ha, Park Yoo-Ha, Park Jae-hyung and Park Hyun-ha. His life takes a turn when he meets his first love, Lee Mi-yeon, after 36 years.

After their mother's untimely death, Park Sun-ha takes the responsibility of her younger siblings. She acts as a mother to the family.

On the other hand, the second daughter, Park Yoo-ha studied hard in medical school and finished her intern course, but sacrifices her dream to become a doctor in order to marry her love, who is from a rich family. They have a daughter, Eun-su. However, her life isn't as perfect as people think it to be.

Meanwhile, Jung Eun-tae is an enthusiastic doctor. He volunteered to perform medical services abroad in Africa, but he comes back to Korea. Eun-tae is not interested in marriage because he believes he is like his father, who places priority on his medical work over family.

Later, Park Yoo-ha and Jung Eun-tae's lives become intertwined.

== Cast ==
=== Main ===
- Han Ji-hye as Park Yoo-ha

She is Hyo-seob's second daughter. She is a rational woman with a passionate heart. Whereas the eldest daughter, Sun-ha, looked after the siblings like a mother, Yoo-ha was the type who would give her younger siblings a lesson. The fact that she got into medical school made her the pride and joy of the family. When she married Seongun, a millionaire's son, she was called a Cinderella and became the envy of many women. Although Seongun made her forgo her dream of becoming a doctor, she still loved him. As time went by, she found herself gradually becoming a woman befitting a member of Seongun's family. As she did for Seongun, she starts to endure everything for her lovely daughter Eun-su.

- Lee Sang-woo as Jung Eun-tae
  - Choi Seung-hoon as young Jung Eun-tae

He's an internist at Jahan Hospital. He is a cranky doctor who takes the lead in going on voluntary medical services abroad. He may be a rogue, but he's the finest doctor. People call him an arrogant, rude and unruly "mad dog," but he doesn't mind it at all because thanks to this nickname, no other doctor would try to irritate him. Surprisingly, he is the most caring brother and uncle to his older sister and his niece, and he's as generous as a saint to his patients. His late father was in the forefront of overseas medical services. Back then, he resented his father for being neglectful of his family while he was busy taking care of his patients. But when he followed his father's footsteps and served in Africa, he finally came to understand his father. But as a side effect, he decided not to marry. Dating is fine, but forget marriage. He doesn't want to hurt his family like his father did. He would commit to practicing medicine for his entire life. After serving in Africa for several years, he returns to Korea when his brother-in-law, who is the director of Jahan Hospital, calls for help. Eventually, he starts dating Yoo-ha.

- Yoo Dong-geun as Park Hyo-seob
  - Yoo In-hyuk as young Park Hyo-seob

He is the master shoemaker and owner of a handmade shoe store. At the same time, he is a compassionate father of four children. This man of perseverance has been making handmade shoes for several decades at the same spot. Ever since his wife died, he has been sacrificing his life for his children, who mean the world to him along with shoes. However, wind suddenly starts blowing in his peaceful life. He had wished that his eldest daughter would marry a reliable man, but she brings a younger boyfriend as a potential spouse. His town, where he has lived his entire life, is targeted for redevelopment. On top of all, his first love, Miyeon, shows up after 36 years, just like a storm and she's no ordinary woman. She's a proud building owner.

- Chang Mi-hee as Lee Mi-yeon
  - Jung Chae-yeon as young Lee Mi-yeon

She is a woman of overbearing haughtiness. But she's also a majestic and elegant landlord. She is arrogant, but she behaves with common decency. She is rude, but she keeps it within bounds. She makes poignant remarks, but she only says the right things. That's why even her audacity and evil tongue seem to make her more charming. Every single investment she makes hits the jackpot, and everything prospers with her. Nevertheless, her life was not without a few bumps on the road. After her husband ran off overseas when his company went bankrupt, she started from the bottom and kept on rolling until she came to own a building. Although she is enjoying a glamorous single life, she feels empty inside somehow. In the beginning, she lives with her "son" Moon-sik. To recollect the happiest time of her life, she decides to restore the house in which she lived with her father in her twenties. Then she comes across Hyoseob, her first love and object of her hatred.

- Park Sun-young as Park Sun-ha

Hyo-seob's first daughter. She became the mother of the family after her mother died.

- Yeo Hoe-hyun as Park Jae-hyung

Hyo-seob's only son. He's trying to find a job.

- Keum Sae-rok as Park Hyun-ha

Hyo-seob's last born child.

=== Supporting ===
- Park Chul-ho as Ma Dong-ho
- Kim Ye-ryeong as Shim Il-soon
- Choi Jung-woo as Yeon Chan-koo
- Kim Mi-kyung as Jung Jin-hee
- Park Se-wan as Yeon Da-yeon
- Kim Kwon as Choi Moon-sik
- Park Joon-geum as Woo A-mi
- Kang Sung-wook as Cha Kyung-su
- Hwang Dong-joo as Chae Sung-woon
- Kim Yoon-kyung as Chae Hee-kyung
- Park Sang-myun as CEO Yang
- Kim Ae-ran as Kim Young-shik's wife
- Choi Dae-chul as Team Leader Go
- Lee Ji-hoon as Manager Yoo
- Hong Seung-hwi as Assistant Manager Kim
- Lee Kan-hee as Kang Young-jin
- Kim Woo-hyuk as Ji Woong-hee
- Kang Yu-chan as VIP customer (Cameo)
- Ji Yoon-ho as Han Tae-soo
- Kim Yu-seok as Choi Dong-jin
- Lee Han-wi as Kim Young-sik (cameo)

== Production ==
The first script read was held in December 2017 at KBS Annex Building.

=== Controversy ===
The "Hope Solidarity Union" (희망연대노조) recently expressed concern about the well-being of the drama's working staff. According to the union, the production staff members were exposed to a harsh working environment: they were overworked but their salary was too low. The HSU is currently mediating a dialogue between the staff, KBS, and GnG Production.

== Original soundtrack ==
No.	Title	Artist	Length
1.	"꿈" (Dream)	Kim Jung Min (김정민)	3:46
2.	"커플" (Couple)	Taeha (태하)	3:10
3.	"여자로 살래" (Living as a woman)	Shin Yeong Ah (신연아)	3:43
4.	"내 안에 그 사람" (The Person Within Me)	Monday Kiz (먼데이 키즈)	3:59
5.	"그래도 사랑이야" (It's Still Love)	Beige (베이지)	3:56
6.	"사랑한다는 말" (Saying I Love You)	Ock Joo Hyun (옥주현)	3:43
7.	"사랑이란건" (The Thing Called Love)	Dong Woo (동우)	4:12

== Viewership ==
Marry Me Now : South Korea viewers per episode (millions)

Episodes	Episode number									
Episodes	1	2	3	4	5	6	7	8	9	10
1-10	3.616	4.490	3.685	4.336	3.571	4.652	3.572	4.956	4.105	5.011
11-20	4.663	5.429	4.242	5.142	3.877	4.680	4.920	5.280	4.043	5.204
21-30	4.164	5.508	4.187	5.336	4.558	5.456	3.938	5.410	5.277	5.064
31-40	6.066	4.418	5.753	4.651	5.786	4.712	6.011	4.781	5.781	4.851
41-50	5.882	5.364	6.234	5.174	5.832	5.017	4.394	6.205	5.207	6.669

Source: Audience measurement performed nationwide by Nielsen Media Research.

Average TV viewership ratings
Ep.	Original broadcast date	Average audience share			
Ep.	Original broadcast date	TNmS Ratings		AGB Nielsen	
Ep.	Original broadcast date	Nationwide	Seoul National Capital Area	Nationwide	Seoul National Capital Area
1	March 17, 2018	24.5% (1st)	20.1%	23.3% (1st)	22.9% (1st)
2	March 18, 2018	28.2% (1st)	24.4%	27.1% (1st)	26.3% (1st)
3	March 24, 2018	24.4% (1st)	20.3%	23.1% (1st)	23.1% (1st)
4	March 25, 2018	28.3% (1st)	23.9%	26.7% (1st)	26.3% (1st)
5	March 31, 2018	23.1% (1st)	19.3%	21.8% (1st)	21.0% (1st)
6	April 1, 2018	28.3% (1st)	24.0%	27.7% (1st)	27.4% (1st)
7	April 7, 2018	25.2% (1st)	21.4%	23.2% (1st)	22.2% (1st)
8	April 8, 2018	29.8% (1st)	25.5%	28.3% (1st)	28.0% (1st)
9	April 14, 2018	26.9% (1st)	23.0%	24.8% (1st)	23.9% (1st)
10	April 15, 2018	30.9% (1st)	27.0%	29.4% (1st)	27.5% (1st)
11	April 21, 2018	26.1% (1st)	22.2%	26.6% (1st)	25.7% (1st)
12	April 22, 2018	31.3% (1st)	27.4%	31.6% (1st)	30.3% (1st)
13	April 28, 2018	26.1% (1st)	22.6%	25.7% (1st)	24.2% (1st)
14	April 29, 2018	30.2% (1st)	26.3%	30.4% (1st)	28.6% (1st)
15	May 5, 2018	25.3% (1st)	21.0%	23.7% (1st)	22.4% (1st)
16	May 6, 2018	29.1% (1st)	25.6%	26.7% (1st)	24.3% (1st)
17	May 12, 2018	28.4% (1st)	24.3%	27.8% (1st)	26.8% (1st)
18	May 13, 2018	32.3% (1st)	28.6%	30.7% (1st)	30.0% (1st)
19	May 19, 2018	27.5% (1st)	23.9%	24.1% (1st)	22.5% (1st)
20	May 20, 2018	30.8% (1st)	26.4%	29.1% (1st)	27.7% (1st)
21	May 26, 2018	25.1% (1st)	21.3%	24.5% (1st)	22.9% (1st)
22	May 27, 2018	28.9% (1st)	27.6%	31.5% (1st)	30.0% (1st)
23	June 2, 2018	27.8% (1st)	23.5%	25.8% (1st)	24.7% (1st)
24	June 3, 2018	33.0% (1st)	29.6%	30.5% (1st)	28.1% (1st)
25	June 9, 2018	28.0% (1st)	23.7%	28.0% (1st)	26.8% (1st)
26	June 10, 2018	31.4% (1st)	26.9%	31.7% (1st)	30.2% (1st)
27	June 16, 2018 (Note: Delayed by an hour due to coverage of the 2018 FIFA World Cup.)	26.9% (1st)	22.6%	23.8% (1st)	21.7% (1st)
28	June 17, 2018	33.2% (1st)	29.4%	31.8% (1st)	30.0% (1st)
29	June 24, 2018 (Note: No episode was shown on June 23 due to coverage of the 2018 FIFA World Cup Group F match between South Korea and Mexico.)	32.1% (1st)	28.0%	31.4% (1st)	30.3% (1st)
30	June 30, 2018	29.8% (1st)	25.4%	29.7% (1st)	28.3% (1st)
31	July 1, 2018	34.2% (1st)	30.0%	34.2% (1st)	33.1% (1st)
32	July 7, 2018	26.7% (1st)	22.1%	26.9% (1st)	25.2% (1st)
33	July 8, 2018	33.0% (1st)	28.9%	33.1% (1st)	31.1% (1st)
34	July 14, 2018	27.7% (1st)	23.8%	27.1% (1st)	26.2% (1st)
35	July 15, 2018	32.5% (1st)	28.7%	32.1% (1st)	31.3% (1st)
36	July 21, 2018	28.6% (1st)	24.9%	27.1% (1st)	25.5% (1st)
37	July 22, 2018	33.5% (1st)	29.0%	32.6% (1st)	31.1% (1st)
38	July 28, 2018	29.8% (1st)	26.1%	28.9% (1st)	28.2% (1st)
39	July 29, 2018	33.3% (1st)	29.5%	32.0% (1st)	31.3% (1st)
40	August 4, 2018	28.2% (1st)	24.3%	27.4% (1st)	25.6% (1st)
41	August 5, 2018	30.9% (1st)	27.2%	32.4% (1st)	31.7% (1st)
42	August 11, 2018	29.5% (1st)	25.8%	29.2% (1st)	30.4% (1st)
43	August 12, 2018	32.9% (1st)	29.1%	34.4% (1st)	33.6% (1st)
44	August 18, 2018	30.3% (1st)	26.5%	30.6% (1st)	28.8% (1st)
45	August 19, 2018	33.0% (1st)	29.2%	33.4% (1st)	32.1% (1st)
46	August 25, 2018	28.8% (1st)	25.0%	29.2% (1st)	27.4% (1st)
47	August 26, 2018	24.6% (1st)	20.5%	25.0% (1st)	23.9% (1st)
48	September 2, 2018 (Note: No episode was shown on September 1 due to coverage of the 2018 Asian Games football match finals between South Korea and Japan.)	35.4% (1st)	—N/a	34.0% (1st)	32.0% (1st)
49	September 8, 2018	32.3% (1st)	—N/a	32.0% (1st)	29.8% (1st)
50	September 9, 2018	38.8% (1st)	—N/a	36.9% (1st)	34.7% (1st)
Average		29.5%	–	28.8%	27.5%
Special	June 23, 2018	—N/a		13.6% (1st)	13.4% (1st)
In this table above, the blue numbers represent the lowest ratings and the red numbers represent the highest ratings.; N/A denotes that the rating is not known.

== Awards and nominations ==
Year	Award	Category	Recipient	Result	Ref.
2018	11th Korea Drama Awards	Grand Prize	Yoo Dong-geun	Won	
2018	11th Korea Drama Awards	Best Drama	Marry Me Now	Won	
2018	11th Korea Drama Awards	Best Screenplay	Park Pil-joo	Won	
2018	11th Korea Drama Awards	Top Excellence Award, Actor	Lee Sang-woo	Nominated	
2018	11th Korea Drama Awards	Top Excellence Award, Actress	Han Ji-hye	Nominated	
2018	11th Korea Drama Awards	Best New Actor	Yeo Hoe-hyun	Nominated	
2018	11th Korea Drama Awards	Best New Actress	Park Se-wan	Nominated	
2018	11th Korea Drama Awards	Best Original Soundtrack	"The Person Within Me" (Monday Kiz)	Won	
2018	6th APAN Star Awards	Top Excellence Award, Actor in a Serial Drama	Lee Sang-woo	Won	
2018	6th APAN Star Awards	Top Excellence Award, Actress in a Serial Drama	Han Ji-hye	Nominated	
2018	2018 KBS Drama Awards	Grand Prize	Yoo Dong-geun	Won	
2018	2018 KBS Drama Awards	Top Excellence Award, Actor	Yoo Dong-geun	Nominated	
2018	2018 KBS Drama Awards	Top Excellence Award, Actress	Chang Mi-hee	Won	
2018	2018 KBS Drama Awards	Excellence Award, Actor in a Serial Drama	Yoo Dong-geun	Nominated	
2018	2018 KBS Drama Awards	Excellence Award, Actor in a Serial Drama	Lee Sang-woo	Won	
2018	2018 KBS Drama Awards	Excellence Award, Actress in a Serial Drama	Han Ji-hye	Won	
2018	2018 KBS Drama Awards	Excellence Award, Actress in a Serial Drama	Chang Mi-hee	Nominated	
2018	2018 KBS Drama Awards	Excellence Award, Actress in a Serial Drama	Park Sun-young	Nominated	
2018	2018 KBS Drama Awards	Best New Actor	Kim Kwon	Won	
2018	2018 KBS Drama Awards	Best New Actress	Park Se-wan	Won	
2018	2018 KBS Drama Awards	Best New Actress	Keum Sae-rok	Nominated	
2018	2018 KBS Drama Awards	Best Couple Award	Yoo Dong-geun & Chang Mi-hee	Won	
