= Lee Chung-ah =

South Korean actress (born 1984)

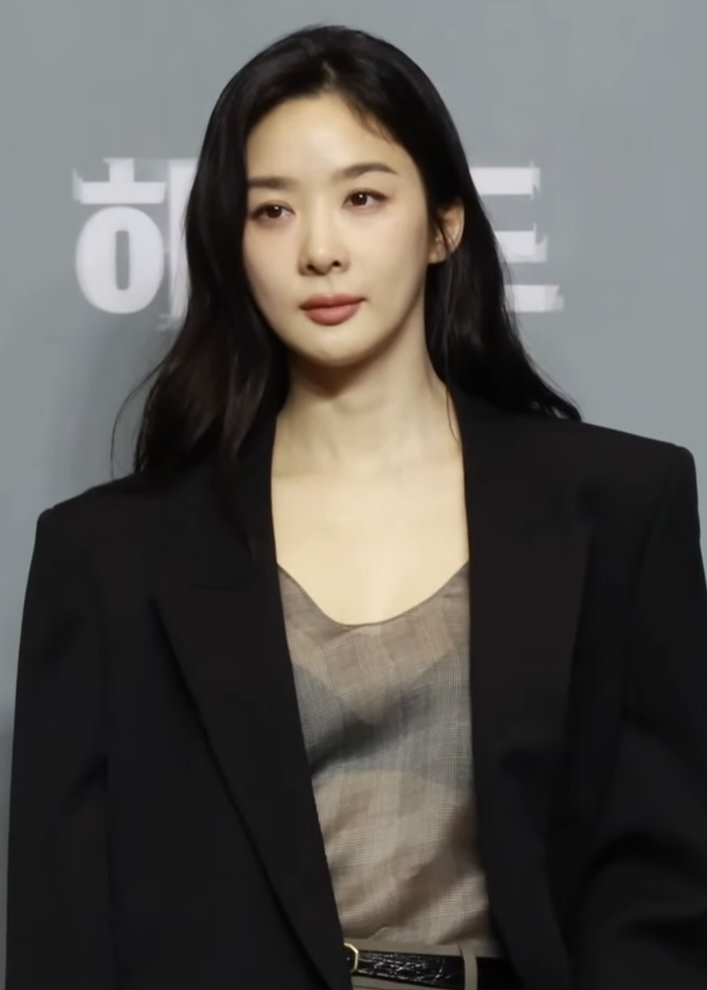
- Lee in March 2024
- Born: October 29, 1984 (age 41); South Korea
- Education: Hanyang University (Theater and Film)
- Occupation: Actress
- Years active: 2002–present
- Agent: Management Soop
- Height: 166 cm (5 ft 5 in)
- Father: Lee Seung-chul

Korean name
- Hangul: 이청아
- RR: I Cheonga
- MR: I Ch'ŏnga

Lee Chung-ah (Korean: 이청아; born October 29, 1984) is a South Korean actress. She is best known for her leading roles in the films Temptation of Wolves (2004) and My Tutor Friend 2 (2007), as well as the cable dramas Cool Guys, Hot Ramen (2011), VIP (2019) and Celebrity (2023).

== Career ==
Lee Chung-ah began her acting career by playing supporting roles in the films Resurrection of the Little Match Girl (2002) and Happy Ero Christmas (2003). In 2004, she landed her first leading role in Temptation of Wolves (2004), a film adaptation of an internet novel by Guiyeoni. Lee played a country girl who moves to the city and attracts the attention of the two most popular boys in town, played by Jo Han-sun and Kang Dong-won. The film made the two actors into breakout stars, but not Lee.

She was cast as a lead actress in her first television drama Let's Go to the Beach (2005), where she and Lee Wan played bickering lifeguards who later fall in love. In 2006, Lee starred in the family drama Going Together and the omnibus film Ssunday Seoul.

Lee then starred in My Tutor Friend 2 (2007), the sequel to the 2003 hit film of the same title. She studied Japanese for her role as a Japanese exchange student who goes to Korea in search of her first love, then meets a happy-go-lucky university student (Park Ki-woong) who becomes her Korean language tutor. A year later, she was cast in Kim Jee-woon's kimchi western The Good, the Bad, the Weird (2008) in a small role as the foster sister of Jung Woo-sung's character. Lee said that she practiced horseback riding for this film but those scenes were deleted in post-production. She later showed her horseback riding skills in Chosun Police Season 2, a series set during the reign of Emperor Gojong in which she played a damo with a dark past.

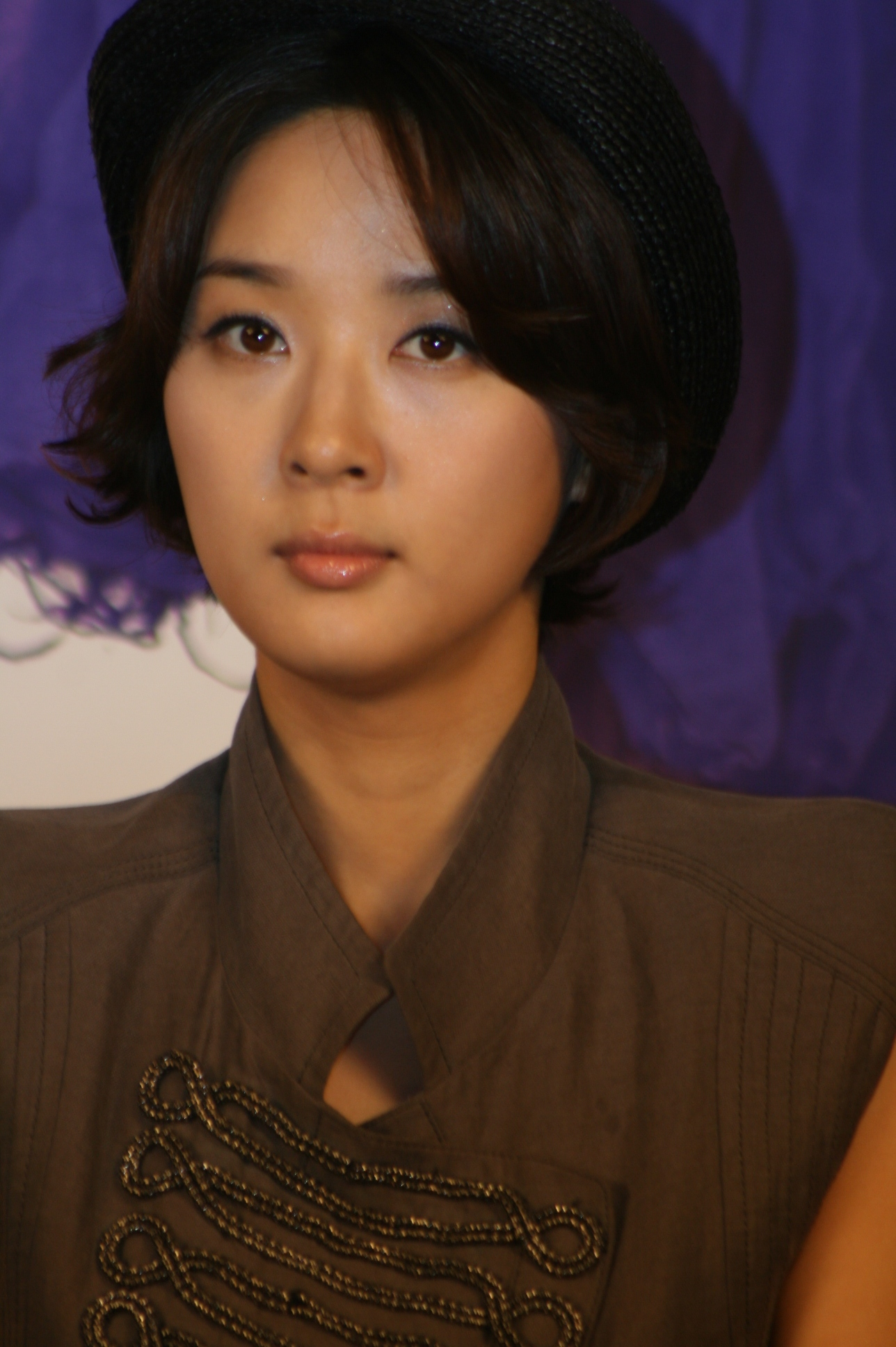
Lee in April 2009

On television, Lee continued to appear in supporting roles in 2009 with the romantic comedy The Accidental Couple and family drama Jolly Widows. This was followed by the 2010 daily drama Pure Pumpkin Flower, where she played a pure-hearted girl who never loses hope even in difficult circumstances.

In 2011, she starred in the leading role in cable romantic comedy series Cool Guys, Hot Ramen. Lee played a college girl preparing for teacher certification examination who unexpectedly inherits her father's ramen restaurant; she becomes involved in a love triangle with two of her employees, the arrogant heir to the biggest food conglomerate in Korea (Jung Il-woo) and a lazy but warm-heated genius chef (Lee Ki-woo). Cool Guys, Hot Ramen received solid ratings for a Korean cable drama, and became the first of tvN's "flower boy" programming, which included Dating Agency: Cyrano on which Lee made a guest appearance in 2013.

Lee was in two variety shows in 2012. She hosted Cats and Dogs, a talk show in which pet owners shared information to foster a more mature pet culture. Lee then appeared in the second season of Music and Lyrics, a reality show in which a celebrity pair write and compose a song together. She wrote the lyrics and actor Seo Ji-seok composed the music for the ballad "Looking Forward to It," which was sung by Heo Young-saeng and used as the theme song of Seo In-guk's character in the family drama The Sons.

Lee reunited with Happy Ero Christmas costar Kim Sun-a in the 2013 revenge thriller The Five. Adapted from the webtoon of the same title, she played a detective with a delinquent credit history who helps kill a serial killer in exchange for an organ transplant for her ill mother. Later in the year, she played a doormat wife in the weekend drama series Wonderful Mama.

In 2019, Lee returned to small screen with office mystery drama VIP.

In July 2021, Lee signed a contract with J-Wide Company.

In 2022, Lee appeared in the SBS drama One Dollar Lawyer.

In October 2024, Lee signed an exclusive contract with Management Soop.

In 2026, Lee starred in ENA's mystery legal thriller television series Honour alongside Jung Eun-chae and Lee Na-young. It is based on the Swedish television series Heder which evolves around a 20-year-old secret that the three lawyer friends buried, which resurfaces and throws their lives into chaos.

She was scheduled to appear in the 2027 TVING drama The Obedient Killer (Korean: 고분고분한 킬러), but was involved in a traffic accident while traveling for filming around August 2026. The accident aggravated her pre-existing back condition, making it difficult for her to continue filming the series' action scenes, and her withdrawal from the drama was subsequently discussed.

== Personal life ==
Her father is musical theatre actor Lee Seung-chul.

She began dating actor Lee Ki-woo in 2013; they were co-stars in the 2011 series Cool Guys, Hot Ramen and broke up in 2019.

== Filmography ==
=== Film ===
Year	Title	Role	Notes	Ref.
2002	Resurrection of the Little Match Girl	Girl in soju-bang		
2002	Tears	Girl		
2003	Happy Ero Christmas	Lee Hae-min		
2004	Twentidentity	Girl	Segment: "Convenience Store at 2:00 a.m."	
2004	Temptation of Wolves	Jung Han-kyung		
2005	The Dark Plan of Green Tea Planet	S	Short film	
2006	Ssunday Seoul	Young-ja	Segment: "The Young Adventurer"	
2007	My Tutor Friend 2	Kitano Junko		
2008	The Good, the Bad, the Weird	Song-yi		
2010	The First Love Series	Han Seo-yeon	Segment: "Paper Crane"	
2010	Finding Mr. Destiny	Ji-hye		
2010	Oh! Happy Day	Girl next door	Short film	
2010	Lee Chung-ah's Seoul Play		Short film	
2013	The Five	Park Jeong-ha		
2014	First Love Struck Me One Day	Yong-jae		
2014	Twinkle-Twinkle Pitter-Patter		Short film	
2015	Northern Limit Line	Lieutenant Choi Yoon-jung	Cameo	
2017	Bluebeard	Mi-yeon		
2019	Spring, Again			

=== Television series ===
Year	Title	Role	Notes	Ref.
2005	Let's Go to the Beach	Yoon So-ra		
2006	Going Together	Da-seul		
2008	Chosun Police 2	Han Da-kyung		
2009	The Accidental Couple	Goo Min-ji		
2009	Jolly Widows	Han Soo-hyun		
2010	Pure Pumpkin Flower	Park Soon-jung		
2011	Cool Guys, Hot Ramen	Yang Eun-bi		
2013	Wonderful Mama	Oh Da-jung		
2013	Dating Agency: Cyrano	Seol Yoo-jin	Cameo (Episode 1)	
2014	High School King of Savvy	Attractive woman	Cameo (Episode 17)	
2014	KBS Drama Special – "Bride in Sneakers"	Park Bo-kyung		
2015–2016	Riders: Catch Tomorrow	Yoon So-dam		
2016	The Vampire Detective	Yo-na		
2016	Lucky Romance	Seol-hee / Amy		
2017	Because This Is My First Life	Go Jung-min		
2019	Beautiful World	Kang Joon-Ha		
2019	VIP	Lee Hyeon-ah		
2020	JTBC Drama Festa – "Hello Dracula"	So-jung		
2020–2021	Awaken	Jamie Leighton		
2022	One Dollar Lawyer	Lee Joo-young		
2023	My Dearest	Gak-hwa	Part 2	
2026	Honour	Hwang Hyun-jin		

=== Web series ===
Year	Title	Role	Ref.
2017–2018	The Best Moment to Quit Your Job	Sun-hee	
2023	Celebrity	Yoon Shi-hyeon	
2024	Hide	Ha Yeon-ju	

=== Television shows ===
Year	Title	Role	Notes	Ref.
2010	The Fox's Butler	Host		
2012	Cats and Dogs	Host		
2012	Music and Lyrics (Season 2)		Paired with Seo Ji-seok	
2016	Battle Trip	Contestant	With Seo Hyo-rim (Episodes 27–30)	
2018	Rural Police	Cast member	Seasons 3–4	
2018	Everyone's Kitchen	Cast member	Pilot episode	
2019	Everyone's Kitchen	Cast member	Episode 1–11 (except episode 6)	
2022	The Power of the Art Market, Art Collection	Narrator	Special documentary	

=== Music video appearances ===
Year	Title	Artist	Ref.
2004	"We Were in Love"	Lyn	
2005	"Coward"	Buzz	
2008	"웃어도 눈물이"	Ryu Joo-hwan	
2008	"Because of You"	Shin Hye-sung	
2010	"Telephone"	Electro Boyz (feat. Horan)	
2010	"Full Story"	V.O.S	
2013	"The Day to Love"	Lee Seung-chul	
2015	"The Only Thing I Can't Do"	Gummy	

== Ambassadorship ==
- Ambassador for the 1st Ulsan International Film Festival (2021)

== Accolades ==
=== Awards and nominations ===
Name of the award ceremony, year presented, category, nominee of the award, and the result of the nomination
Award ceremony	Year	Category	Nominee / Work	Result	Ref.
The 11th Asian Model Awards	2016	Model Star Award	Lee Chung-ah	Won	
Cable TV Broadcasting Awards	2016	Best Character	Riders: Get Tomorrow	Won	
Golden Cinematography Awards	2005	Best New Actress	Temptation of Wolves	Won	
Grand Bell Awards	2005	Best New Actress	Temptation of Wolves	Won	
KBS Drama Awards	2009	Best New Actress	The Accidental Couple and Jolly Widows	Nominated	
MBC Drama Awards	2016	Excellence Award, Actress in a Miniseries	Lucky Romance	Nominated	
MBC Drama Awards	2023	Top Excellence Award, Actress in a Miniseries	My Dearest	Nominated	
SBS Drama Awards	2019	Best Supporting Actress	VIP	Won	
SBS Drama Awards	2022	Best Performance	One Dollar Lawyer	Won	

=== Listicles ===
Name of publisher, year listed, name of listicle, and placement
Publisher	Year	Listicle	Placement	Ref.
Forbes	2020	Korea Power Celebrity	35th	
