= 2009 KBS Drama Awards =

23rd edition of award ceremony

- Date: December 31, 2009
- Hosted by: Tak Jae-hoon; Lee Da-hae; Kim So-yeon

Television coverage
- Network: KBS

The 2009 KBS Drama Awards is a ceremony honoring the outstanding achievement in television on the Korean Broadcasting System (KBS) network for the year of 2009. It was held on December 31, 2009 and hosted by Tak Jae-hoon, Lee Da-hae and Kim So-yeon.

== Nominations and winners ==
(Winners denoted in bold)

Grand Prize (Daesang)
**Lee Byung-hun** – **IRIS**
| Top Excellence Award, Actor | Top Excellence Award, Actress |
| **Son Hyun-joo** – **My Too Perfect Sons**; Hong Yo-seob – Jolly Widows; Hwang Jung-min – The Accidental Couple; Ji Jin-hee – He Who Can't Marry; Kim Seung-woo – IRIS; Lee Byung-hun – IRIS | **Chae Shi-ra** – **Empress Cheonchu**; Choi Myung-gil – Again, My Love; Kim Tae-hee – IRIS; Ku Hye-sun – Boys Over Flowers; Oh Yeon-soo – The Queen Returns; Yoon Mi-ra – My Too Perfect Sons |
| Excellence Award, Actor in a Miniseries | Excellence Award, Actress in a Miniseries |
| **Ji Jin-hee** – **He Who Can't Marry**; Hwang Jung-min – The Accidental Couple; Ji Hyun-woo – Invincible Lee Pyung Kang; Lee Dong-wook – The Partner; Yoon Sang-hyun – My Fair Lady | **Kim Ah-joong** – **The Accidental Couple**; Kim Hyun-joo – The Partner; Nam Sang-mi – Invincible Lee Pyung Kang; Uhm Jung-hwa – He Who Can't Marry; Yoon Eun-hye – My Fair Lady |
| Excellence Award, Actor in a Mid-length Drama | Excellence Award, Actress in a Mid-length Drama |
| **Jung Joon-ho** – **IRIS**; **Kim Seung-woo** – **IRIS**; Jung Gyu-woon – Again, My Love; Lee Byung-hun – IRIS; Lee Min-ho – Boys Over Flowers; Park Hae-jin – Hot Blood; Park Yong-ha – The Slingshot | **Kim Tae-hee** – **IRIS**; **Ku Hye-sun** – **Boys Over Flowers**; Choi Myung-gil – Again, My Love, Invincible Lee Pyung Kang; Jeon In-hwa – Again, My Love; Kim So-yeon – IRIS; Park Si-yeon – The Slingshot; Park Ye-jin – Again, My Love |
| Excellence Award, Actor in a Serial Drama | Excellence Award, Actress in a Serial Drama |
| **Kim Suk-hoon** – **Empress Cheonchu**; Choi Jae-sung – Empress Cheonchu; Lee Joon-hyuk – Three Brothers; Lee Pil-mo – My Too Perfect Sons; Son Hyun-joo – My Too Perfect Sons | **Yoo Sun** – **My Too Perfect Sons**; Do Ji-won – Three Brothers; Park Sun-young – My Too Perfect Sons; Shim Hye-jin – Empress Cheonchu |
| Excellence Award, Actor in a Daily Drama | Excellence Award, Actress in a Daily Drama |
| **Oh Man-seok** – **Jolly Widows**; Lee Jong-won – Jolly Widows; Lee Sang-woo – The Road Home; Jang Hyun-sung – Tale of Two Sisters | **Jo An** – **Jolly Widows**; Jang Shin-young – The Road Home; Kim Sae-ah – Tale of Two Sisters; Lee Eung-kyung – Jolly Widows; Shim Hye-jin – Jolly Widows; Yoon Hae-young – Tale of Two Sisters |
| Excellence Award, Actor in a One-Act/Special/Short Drama | Excellence Award, Actress in a One-Act/Special/Short Drama |
| **Kim Kyu-chul** – **Korean Ghost Stories "The Grudge Island"**; Ahn Jae-mo – Korean Ghost Stories "Gumiho"; Jeong Bo-seok – My Dad Loves Trouble; Jung Gyu-woon – Korean Ghost Stories "The Grudge Island"; Yoon Hee-seok – Korean Ghost Stories "The Forbidden Book" | **Kim Sung-eun** – **Korean Ghost Stories "The Forbidden Book"**; Jang Hee-jin – Korean Ghost Stories "Come with Me to Hell"; Jeon Hye-bin – Korean Ghost Stories "Gumiho"; Jung Ae-ri – TV Literature "Sister's Menopause"; Shim Eun-kyung – My Dad Loves Trouble |
| Best Supporting Actor | Best Supporting Actress |
| **Choi Cheol-ho** – **Empress Cheonchu**, **Hot Blood**, **The Partner**; **Yoon Joo-sang** – **My Too Perfect Sons**, **The Accidental Couple**, **IRIS**; Cho Jin-woong – My Too Perfect Sons, Hot Blood; Han Sang-jin – My Too Perfect Sons; Kim Myung-soo – Empress Cheonchu; Lee Moon-sik – The Slingshot | **Moon Jeong-hee** – **Empress Cheonchu**; Jeon Mi-seon – The Accidental Couple; Kim Hye-ok – My Too Perfect Sons; Lee Bo-hee – Three Brothers; Park Hae-mi – Jolly Widows; Yang Jung-a – He Who Can't Marry |
| Best New Actor | Best New Actress |
| **Lee Min-ho** – **Boys Over Flowers**; Jung Il-woo - My Fair Lady; Kim Bum – Boys Over Flowers; Kim Hyun-joong – Boys Over Flowers; Park Ki-woong – The Slingshot, Invincible Lee Pyung Kang; T.O.P. – IRIS; Yoo Ah-in – He Who Can't Marry | **Kim So-eun** – **Boys Over Flowers**, **He Who Can't Marry**, **Empress Cheonchu**; Jo Yoon-hee – Hot Blood; Lee Chung-ah – The Accidental Couple, Jolly Widows; Moon Chae-won – My Fair Lady; Oh Ji-eun – Three Brothers; Park Han-byul – Jolly Widows |
| Best Young Actor | Best Young Actress |
| **Park Chang-ik** – **Splendor of Youth**; Choi Min-hwan – The Road Home; Oh Seung-yoon – The Queen Returns; Park Ji-bin – Boys Over Flowers; Wang Seok-hyeon – My Fair Lady | **Park Eun-bin** – **Empress Cheonchu**; Kim Hwan-hee – Invincible Lee Pyung Kang; Kim So-young – The Road Home; Shim Eun-kyung – My Dad Loves Trouble; Seo Shin-ae – Splendor of Youth |
| Netizen Award, Actor | Netizen Award, Actress |
| **Lee Byung-hun** – **IRIS**; Choi Cheol-ho – Empress Cheonchu, Hot Blood, The Partner; Hwang Jung-min – The Accidental Couple; Ji Hyun-woo – Invincible Lee Pyung Kang; Jung Gyu-woon – Again, My Love; Kim Dong-gun – TV Novel Glory of Youth; Kim Dong-wook – The Partner; Kim Hyun-joong – Boys Over Flowers; Kim Suk-hoon – Empress Cheonchu; Lee Dong-wook – The Partner; Lee Joon-hyuk – Three Brothers; Lee Min-ho – Boys Over Flowers; Lee Phillip – The Slingshot; Lee Pil-mo – My Too Perfect Sons; Lee Sang-woo – The Road Home; Oh Man-seok – Jolly Widows; Park Hae-jin – Hot Blood; Park Yong-ha – The Slingshot; Son Hyun-joo – My Too Perfect Sons; Tak Jae-hoon – The Queen Returns; Yoon Sang-hyun – My Fair Lady | **Ku Hye-sun** – **Boys Over Flowers**; Chae Jung-an – Hot Blood; Chae Shi-ra – Empress Cheonchu; Han Yeo-woon – The Slingshot; Hwang Shin-hye – The Queen Returns; Jang Shin-young – The Road Home; Jo An – Jolly Widows; Kim Ah-joong – The Accidental Couple; Kim Hyun-joo – The Partner; Kim Tae-hee – IRIS; Lee Chae-young – Empress Cheonchu; Lee Tae-ran – My Precious You; Nam Sang-mi – Invincible Lee Pyung Kang; Oh Ji-eun – Three Brothers; Oh Yeon-soo – The Queen Returns; Park Si-yeon – The Slingshot; Park Sun-young – My Too Perfect Sons; Park Ye-jin – Again, My Love; Shin Yi – The Partner; Yoo Sun – My Too Perfect Sons; Yoon Eun-hye – My Fair Lady |
| Popularity Award, Actor | Popularity Award, Actress |
| **Yoon Sang-hyun** – **My Fair Lady** | **Kim So-yeon** – **IRIS**; **Yoon Eun-hye** – **My Fair Lady** |
| Best Couple Award | Best Writer |
| **Lee Byung-hun** and **Kim Tae-hee** – **IRIS**; **Lee Min-ho** and **Ku Hye-sun** – **Boys Over Flowers**; **Lee Pil-mo** and **Yoo Sun** – **My Too Perfect Sons**; **Yoon Sang-hyun** and **Yoon Eun-hye** – **My Fair Lady**; Bae Do-hwan and Ha Yi-en – Hometown Over Hills; Gil Yong-woo and Choi Myung-gil – Invincible Lee Pyung Kang; Hwang Jung-min and Kim Ah-joong – The Accidental Couple; Ji Hyun-woo and Nam Sang-mi – Invincible Lee Pyung Kang; Jung Gyu-woon and Park Ye-jin – Again, My Love; Kim Ho-jin and Shin Ae – Empress Cheonchu; Kim Hyeong-min and Lee Eun-jung – Empress Cheonchu; Kim Hyun-joong and Ku Hye-sun – Boys Over Flowers; Kim Jin-soo and Ahn Sun-young – The Tale of Janghwa and Hongryeon; Kim Sung-soo and Lee Tae-ran – My Precious You; Kim Young-jun and Moon Bo-ryung – TV Novel Glory of Youth; Lee Byung-hun and Kim So-yeon – IRIS; Lee Dong-wook and Kim Hyun-joo – The Partner; Lee Joon-hyuk and Oh Ji-eun – Three Brothers; Lee Sang-woo and Jang Shin-young – The Road Home; Moon Soo and Yoon Ji-sook – Wife and Woman; Oh Man-seok and Jo An – Jolly Widows; Otani Ryohei and Park Hye-won – The Road Home; Park Hae-jin and Jo Yoon-hee – Hot Blood; Park Jin-woo and Hong Ah-reum – I'll Give You Everything; Park Yong-ha and Park Si-yeon – The Slingshot; Shim Hyung-tak and Cho Yeo-jeong – The Road Home; Tak Jae-hoon and Oh Yeon-soo – The Queen Returns | **Jo Jung-sun** – **My Too Perfect Sons** |
Lifetime Achievement Award
**Yeo Woon-kay**
