= Son Ji-chang =

South Korean actor, singer, and songwriter

- Born: February 20, 1970 (age 56); South Korea
- Occupations: Actor; singer
- Years active: 1989–present
- Spouse: Oh Yeon-soo (m. 1998)
- Children: 2

Korean name
- Hangul: 손지창
- RR: Son Jichang
- MR: Son Chich'ang

Son Ji-chang (born February 20, 1970) is a South Korean actor, singer and songwriter. He starred in television series such as Mudong's House (1991), The Last Match (1994), Trio (2002), and Rose Fence (2003). He is also member of musical duo The Blue.

== Filmography ==
=== Television series ===
Year	Title	Role	Network
1992	Calendula	Cha Song-joo	SBS
1992	Wind in the Grass	Jin Soo	MBC
1993	Walking up to the Sky	Gu Yeon-su	MBC
1994	The Last Match	Lee Dong-min	MBC
1994	Feelings	Han Bin	KBS2
1994	Koreiski		MBC
1996	1.5 Generation	Suk Hyun	MBC
1996	Beginning of Happiness	Myung Gyu	SBS
1997	Premonition	Kyung Min	MBC
1999	Young Sun	Park Min	SBS
2000	The Truth	Park Seung-jae	MBC
2001	Well-known Woman	Jung Byung-hoon	SBS
2002	Present	Oh Kyung-sik	MBC
2002	Trio	Jang Bum-soo	MBC
2003	Rose Fence	Nam Gun-woo	KBS2

=== Variety shows ===
Year	Title	Network	Role	Notes/Ref.
2021	Fireman Boy	tvN STORY & tvN	Cast Member	
2021	Star Golf Big League	tvN D	Cast Member	

== Awards and nominations ==
Year	Award	Category	Nominated work	Result	Ref.
1993	KBS Drama Awards	Popularity Award, Actor	Never on Sunday	Won	
1993	KBS Drama Awards	Excellence Award, Actor	Never on Sunday	Nominated	
1993	29th Baeksang Arts Awards	Best New Actor – Television	Walking up to the Sky	Won	
1994	KBS Music Awards	Artist of the Year		Won	

== Legal matters ==
According to Mr. Son's Facebook, on September 10, 2016, his all electric Sport Utility Vehicle Tesla Model X crashed into his garage.

He has been requesting Tesla Inc. to investigate the accident. Tesla has stated that logs downloaded from the car show that the driver pressed the accelerator instead of the brake. Tesla's press statement to Reuters states,

"We take the safety of our customers very seriously and conducted a thorough investigation following Mr. Son's claims. The evidence, including data from the car, conclusively shows that the crash was the result of Mr. Son pressing the accelerator pedal all the way to 100%."

It also asserts that the actor threatened to use his celebrity to damage Tesla,

"Before filing his class action lawsuit against Tesla, Mr. Son had threatened to use his celebrity status in Korea to hurt Tesla unless we agreed to make a financial payment and acknowledge that the vehicle accelerated on its own. However, the evidence clearly shows the vehicle was not at fault. Our policy is to stand by the evidence and not to give in to ultimatums."

According to the NHTSA, there have been about 16,000 preventable pedal error automobile collisions in the U.S. every year.

Nevertheless, Son filed a lawsuit to claim damages.

On Friday, March 31, 2017, Tesla submitted a motion for an order to dismiss 13 of the 27 causes of action in Plaintiffs' First Amended Complaint ("FAC") citing that they are not relevant to the laws.

The plaintiff now has 15 days as of April 15, 2019 to amend the complaint or the lawsuit is dismissed by U.S. District Judge James V. Selna. The slander and defamation filing is outside of the one-year statute of limitations. For the false advertising and breach of warranty claims, the Judge ruled that Tesla's designs are for safety enhancement and not to prevent the plaintiff's claims of sudden unintended acceleration.
