= Kim Ah-joong =

South Korean actress, model and singer (born 1982)

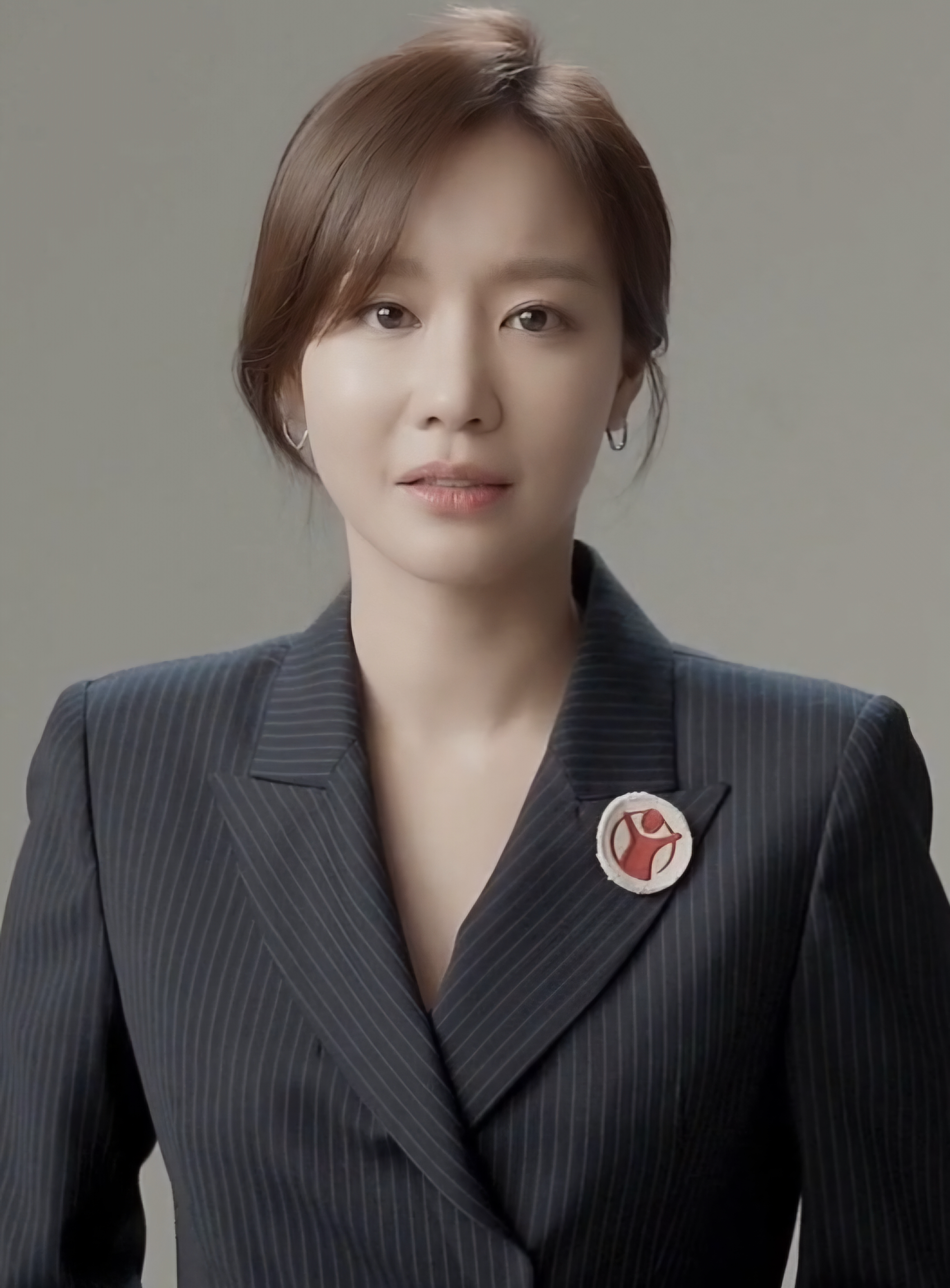
- Kim in April 2020
- Born: October 16, 1982 (age 44); Seoul, South Korea
- Occupations: Actress; singer; model
- Years active: 2004–present

Korean name
- Hangul: 김아중
- Hanja: 金亞中
- RR: Gim Ajung
- MR: Kim Ajung

Kim Ah-joong (Korean: 김아중; born October 16, 1982) is a South Korean actress, model and singer. She is best known for playing the main character in the romantic comedy 200 Pounds Beauty.

== Education ==
Kim graduated from Korea University with a master's degree in journalism.

== Career ==
Kim made her film debut in the romance film When Romance Meets Destiny (2005). She appeared in several commercials and landed her first leading role in the daily soap opera Bizarre Bunch.

Her breakthrough came in the comedy film 200 Pounds Beauty, where she played an overweight girl who undergoes a cosmetic surgery makeover to become a pop sensation. She was awarded the Best Actress award at the 2007 Grand Bell Awards. She released soundtracks of the film, "Beautiful Girl" and the Korean version of the song "Maria". "Beautiful Girl" won Digital Music Awards' "Song of the Month" by Cyworld.

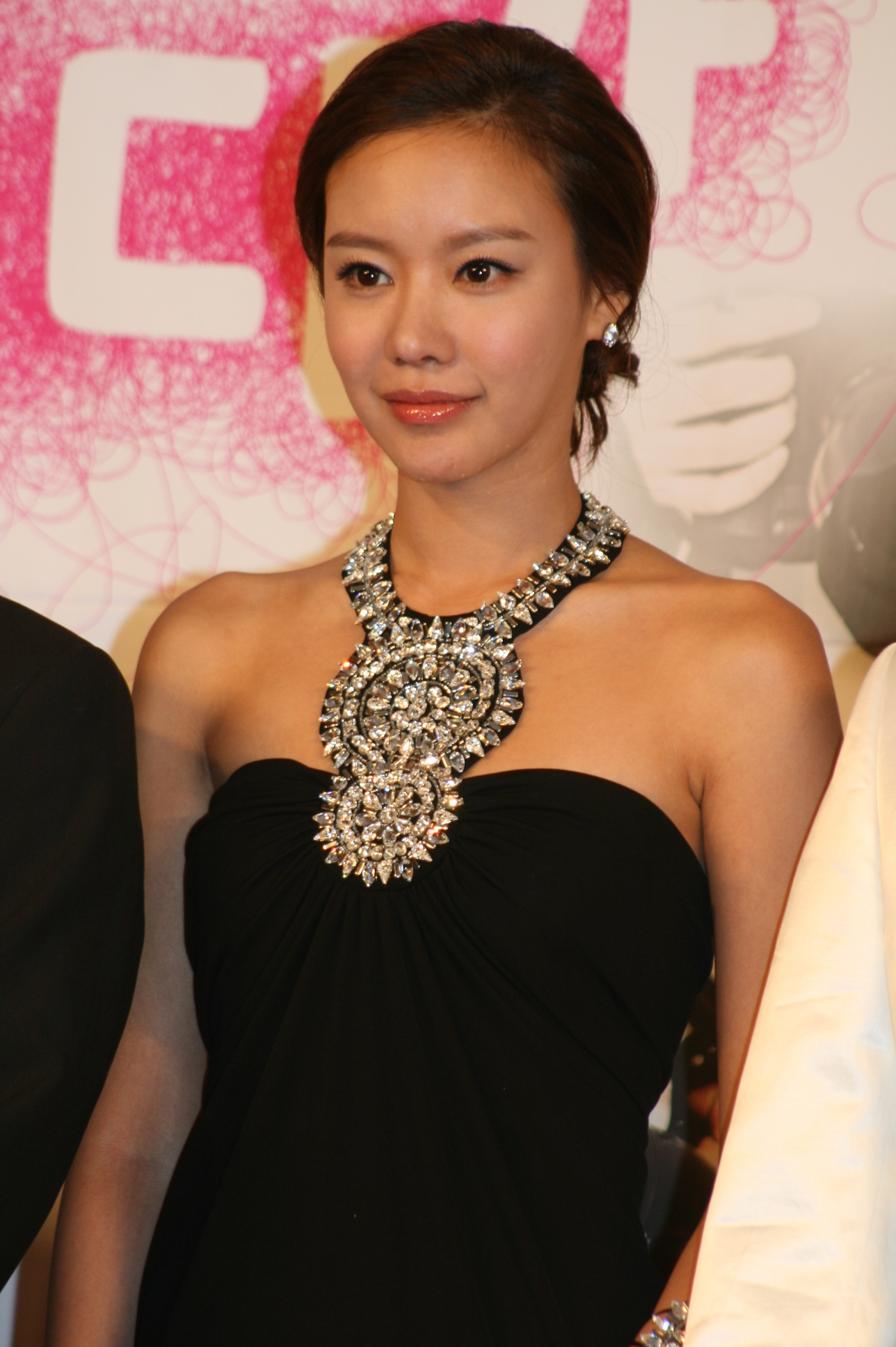
Kim at The Accidental Couple press conference in 2009

Kim returned to acting three years later, starring alongside Hwang Jung-min in the romantic comedy The Accidental Couple. In 2010, Kim was cast in a U.S.-Chinese film project Amazing, a sci-fi film about the development of a virtual-reality basketball game. The same year, she was cast in the medical drama Sign by Kim Eun-hee, playing a forensic scientist.

In September 2011, Kim was found guilty of tax evasion. She also had to pay an additional $600,000 fine. She and her management at the time parted ways due to the verdict. Due to this scandal she was banned from TV work in South Korea from late 2011 to late 2014, and she focused on films. In December 2012, Kim co-starred with Ji Sung in the romantic comedy film My PS Partner. This was followed by another romantic comedy film Steal My Heart in 2013.

She returned to TV in the legal drama Punch, where she received positive reviews for her portrayal of a prosecutor. In 2016, Kim starred in the crime thriller Wanted. In 2017, she starred in the time-slip romantic comedy Live Up to Your Name alongside Kim Nam-gil.

In 2018, Kim was cast in the film adaptation of OCN's crime drama Bad Guys.

In 2022, Kim starred in science fiction thriller Grid as a detective.

== Ambassadorship ==
- 2009: Goodwill Ambassador of FranceExpress
- 2009: 46th Savings Day: Prime Minister Commendation
- 2015: Ambassador for 17th Seoul International Women's Film Festival

== Filmography ==
=== Film ===
Year	Title	Role	Notes	Ref.
2005	When Romance Meets Destiny	Lee Kyung-jae		
2006	200 Pounds Beauty	Kang Han-na / Jenny		
2009	Present	Spy W	Short film	
2010	Foxy Festival	Soo-jung	Cameo	
2012	My PS Partner	Yoon-jung		
2013	Catch Me	Yoon Jin-sook / Lee Sook-ja		
2013	Amazing	Erin		
2017	The King	Sang-hee		
2019	The Bad Guys: Reign of Chaos	Kwak No-soon		

=== Television series ===
Year	Title	Role	Ref.
2004	Emperor of the Sea	Ha Jin	
2005	Our Attitude to Prepare Parting	Seo Hee-won	
2005	Bizarre Bunch	Kim Jong-nam	
2009	The Accidental Couple	Han Ji-soo	
2011	Sign	Go Da-kyung	
2014	Punch	Shin Ha-Gyung	
2016	Wanted	Jung Hye-in	
2017	Live Up to Your Name	Choi Yeon-kyung	
2022	Grid	Jeong Sae-byeok	

=== Music video appearances ===
- Shin Hye-sung – "Same thought"
- Youme – "Words that I couldn't say because I'm a girl" (여자라서 하지 못한 말)

== Awards and nominations ==
Year	Award	Category	Nominated work	Result	Ref.
2005	Dong-A TV Fashion-Beauty Awards	Best Dresser	—N/a	Won	
2005	MBC Drama Awards	Best New Actress	Our Attitude to Prepare Parting	Nominated	
2005	KBS Drama Awards	Best New Actress	Bizarre Bunch	Won	
2006	42nd Baeksang Arts Awards	Best New Actress	When Romance Meets Destiny	Nominated	
2006	42nd Baeksang Arts Awards	Most Popular Actress	When Romance Meets Destiny	Won	
2006	27th Blue Dragon Film Awards	Best New Actress	When Romance Meets Destiny	Nominated	
2007	6th Cyworld Digital Music Awards	Song of the Month	"Beautiful Girl"	Won	
2007	2nd Asia Model Awards	Popular Star Award	—N/a	Won	
2007	30th Golden Cinematography Awards	Best New Actress	200 Pounds Beauty	Won	
2007	4th Max Movie Awards	Best Actress	200 Pounds Beauty	Won	
2007	44th Grand Bell Awards	Best Actress	200 Pounds Beauty	Won	
2007	44th Grand Bell Awards	Popularity Award	200 Pounds Beauty	Won	
2007	1st Mnet 20's Choice Awards	Best Actress	200 Pounds Beauty	Won	
2007	15th Chunsa Film Art Awards	Best Actress	200 Pounds Beauty	Won	
2007	3rd Premiere Magazine's Rising Star Awards	Rising Star	200 Pounds Beauty	Won	
2007	1st Korea Movie Star Awards	Rookie Award	200 Pounds Beauty	Won	
2007	1st Korea Movie Star Awards	Best Couple Award with Joo Jin-mo	200 Pounds Beauty	Won	
2007	45th Motion Pictures Day	Most Promising Actress	200 Pounds Beauty	Won	
2007	28th Blue Dragon Film Awards	Best Actress	200 Pounds Beauty	Nominated	
2007	28th Blue Dragon Film Awards	Popular Star Award	200 Pounds Beauty	Won	
2007	6th Korean Film Awards	Best Actress	200 Pounds Beauty	Nominated	
2007	22nd Golden Disc Awards	Ceci Special Award	"Beautiful Girl"	Won	
2007	Elle Style Award Asia	Hot Face Award	—N/a	Won	
2009	3rd André Kim Best Star Award	Female Star Award	—N/a	Won	
2009	7th Korea Lifestyle Awards	Best Dresser Award	—N/a	Won	
2009	KBS Drama Awards	Excellence Award, Actress in a Miniseries	The Accidental Couple	Won	
2009	KBS Drama Awards	Netizen Award, Actress	The Accidental Couple	Nominated	
2009	KBS Drama Awards	Best Couple Award with Hwang Jung-min	The Accidental Couple	Nominated	
2011	47th Baeksang Arts Awards	Best Actress (TV)	Sign	Nominated	
2011	SBS Drama Awards	Top Excellence Award, Actress in a Drama Special	Sign	Nominated	
2011	SBS Drama Awards	Best Couple Award with Park Shin-yang	Sign	Nominated	
2015	SBS Drama Awards	Top Excellence Award, Actress in a Drama Special	Punch	Nominated	
2015	SBS Drama Awards	Best Couple Award with Kim Rae-won	Punch	Nominated	
2016	5th APAN Star Awards	Excellence Award, Actress in a Miniseries	Wanted	Nominated	
2017	1st The Seoul Awards	Best Actress (TV)	Live Up to Your Name	Nominated	
2019	8th Korea Best Star Awards	Best Actress	The Bad Guys: Reign of Chaos	Won	
