= Mr. Butterfly =

- Theatrical poster
- Directed by: Kim Hyeon-seong
- Written by: Song Min-ho; Kim Hee-jae; Kim Hyeon-seong
- Produced by: Jung Tae-won
- Starring: Kim Jung-eun; Kim Min-jong; Lee Jong-won
- Edited by: Nam Na-yeong
- Distributed by: Taewon Entertainment
- Release date: 1 May 2003
- Running time: 124 minutes
- Country: South Korea
- Language: Korean

Mr. Butterfly (Nabi) is a 2003 South Korean action film. The film is the writing and directorial debut (and, as of 2011, only) film of Kim Hyeon-seong, sometimes credited outside Korea as Marc Kim.

As the distinction between singular and plural is not as important in Korean, the original title could be translated as "butterfly or "butterflies".
