= Park Hae-mi =

South Korean actress (born 1964)

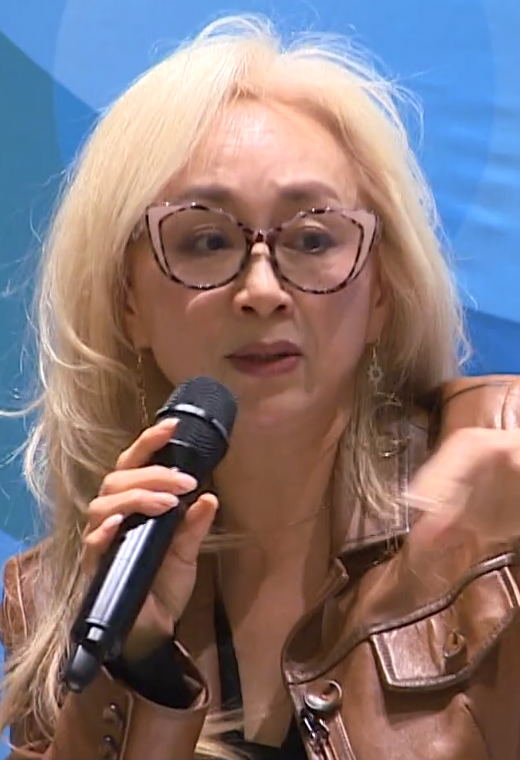
- Park in December 2024
- Born: January 28, 1964 (age 62); Daejeon, South Korea
- Education: Ewha Womans University – Voice
- Occupation: Actress
- Years active: 1984–present
- Agent: Rayun Wellness
- Spouse: Unknown (m. 1988; div. 1994) Hwang Min (m. 1995; div. 2019)
- Children: 2

Korean name
- Hangul: 박해미
- Hanja: 朴海美
- RR: Bak Haemi
- MR: Pak Haemi
- Website: haemee.net

Park Hae-mi (Korean: 박해미; born January 28, 1964) is a South Korean actress. She is best known as a musical theatre actress, starring in stage productions of Mamma Mia!, 42nd Street, and Really Really Like You. Park rose to mainstream popularity with her roles in the television drama Dear Heaven and the sitcom High Kick!.

== Filmography ==
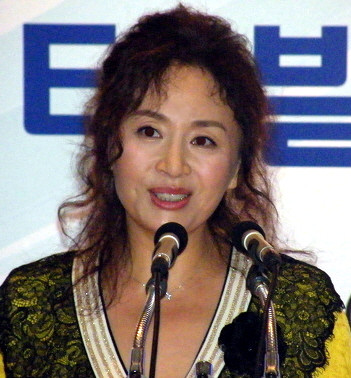
Park in 2009

=== Television series ===
Year	Title	Role	Network
2005	Dear Heaven	Kim Bae-deuk	SBS
2006	High Kick!	Park Hae-mi	MBC
2007	War of Money Bonus Round	Chairwoman Jin	SBS
2008	My Precious You	Nam Joo-ri	KBS2
2009	Jolly Widows	Oh Dong-ja	KBS1
2010	Personal Taste	Jeon Jang-mi	MBC
2010	Smile Again	Byun Sool-nyeo	KBS1
2011	High Kick: Revenge of the Short Legged	Extra (ep.58)	MBC
2011	Bolder By the Day	Park Hae-mi	MBN
2012	Welcome to Town Healing	Oh Ha-ra	TV Chosun
2012	School 2013	Principal Im Jung-soo	KBS2
2013	Princess Aurora	Hwang Mi-mong	MBC
2013	Empress Ki	Shaman (ep.34-35)	MBC
2014	Wife Scandal: The Wind Rises: "One Fine Spring Day"	Wife	TV Chosun
2014	12 Years Promise	Pyung Bum-sook	JTBC
2014	KBS Drama Special: "Bo-mi's Room"	Oh Gil-ja	KBS2
2014	KBS Drama Special: "The Three Female Runaways"	Hyung-ja	KBS2
2015	A Daughter Just Like You	Heo Eun-sook	MBC
2015	Cheer Up!	Principal Choi Kyung-ran	KBS2
2016	One More Happy Ending	Hong Ae-ran's mother (ep.3)	MBC
2016	Five Enough	Cha Min-kyung	KBS2
2017	Lovers in Bloom	Heo Sung-hee	KBS1
2019	Beautiful Love, Wonderful Life	Hong Hwa-yeong	KBS2
2022	Bravo, My Life	Choi Mi-kyung	KBS1

=== Films ===
Year	Title	Role
2010	Sera and Rami	Sera's mother
2013	Youth Talk	Yoon-Sung's mother
2021	Give Water to the Cactus	Hee-sook
2026	Wild Sing	Do-mi's mother-in-law

=== Web series ===
Year	Title	Network	Role	Ref.
2021	The Magic	KT Seezn		

=== Variety shows ===
Year	Title	Network	Notes/Ref.
2007	The Stories of One Thousand People	SBS	MC
2007	Pandora's Box with Park Hae-mi	Olive TV	MC
2011	Happy Weekend with Park Hae-mi	SBS Love FM	DJ
2011	Cantabile	JTBC	
2013	Star King	SBS	Panel of judges
2021	Bride X Club	JTBC	consultant

== Ambassadorship ==
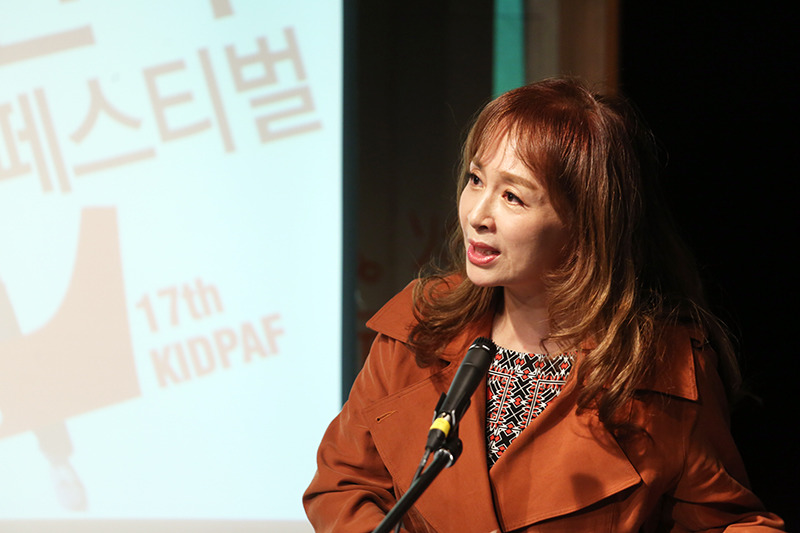
Park in 2017

- Public Relations Ambassador of the Seoul Social Welfare Council (2021)

== Theater ==
Year	Title	Role
1984	Jesus Christ Superstar	
2002	Sunny - The Happiest Girl in the World	
2003	Nunsense Jamboree	
2004	Mamma Mia!	
2004	42nd Street	Dorothy Brock
2005	Menopause The Musical	
2005	Carmen	
2006	Mamma Mia!	
2006	I Do! I Do!	Agnes
2007	Sweeney Todd: The Demon Barber of Fleet Street	Mrs. Lovett
2008	Really Really Like You	Shin Jang-mi
2008	설 Fantasy	
2009	Really Really Like You	Shin Jang-mi
2009	42nd Street	Dorothy Brock
2010	Kiss & Make Up	
2010	Queen of Musical	
2010	Really Really Like You	Shin Jang-mi
2010	42nd Street	Dorothy Brock
2011	Cats	Grizabella
2011	Arirang Fantasy	
2011	Kiss & Make Up	
2012	Roly-Poly of Our Youth	Hyeon-joo
2013	42nd Street	Dorothy Brock
2013	Memories - Copper	Oh Hae-jeong
2013	High Five	
2014	42nd Street	Dorothy Brock
2014	Memories - Copper	Oh Hae-jeong
2018	Matilda	Miss Honey
2021	A Train Named Desire	

== Awards and nominations ==
Year	Award	Category	Nominated work	Result
1986	10th MBC Campus Music Festival	Bronze Award	—N/a	Won
2006	6th MBC Entertainment Awards	Excellence Award, Actress in a Comedy/Sitcom	High Kick!	Won
2007	1st Mnet 20's Choice Awards	Best Drama Star	High Kick!	Won
2007	7th MBC Entertainment Awards	Popularity Award, Actress in a Comedy/Sitcom	High Kick!	Won
2008	16th Korean Culture and Entertainment Awards	Grand Prize (Daesang) in Musical Theatre		Won
2008	22nd KBS Drama Awards	Excellence Award, Actress in a Serial Drama	My Precious You	Nominated
2009	23rd KBS Drama Awards	Best Supporting Actress	Jolly Widows	Nominated
2013	32nd MBC Drama Awards	Golden Acting Award, Actress	Princess Aurora	Nominated
