= Lee Jong-won =

South Korean actor

- Born: September 25, 1969 (age 57); South Korea
- Education: Dankook University
- Occupation: Actor
- Years active: 1988–present
- Agent: Jellyfish Entertainment

Korean name
- Hangul: 이종원
- RR: I Jongwon
- MR: I Chongwŏn

Lee Jong-won (born September 25, 1969) is a South Korean actor.

== Filmography ==
=== Television series ===
- Love Is Blue (1994)
- The Last Match (1994)
- Partner (1994)
- Our Sunny Days of Youth (1995)
- The Scent of Apple Blossoms (1996)
- Icing (1996)
- Women (1997)
- Yesterday (1997)
- Barefooted Youth (1998)
- Heart of Lies (1998)
- Hong Gil-dong (1998)
- Trap of Youth (1999)
- Woman On Top (1999)
- Tough Guy's Love (2000)
- SWAT Police (2000)
- Law Firm (2001)
- Pure Heart (2001)
- Like Father, Unlike Son (2001)
- Terms of Endearment (2004)
- Choice (2004)
- Sad Love Story (2005)
- A Farewell to Sorrow (2005)
- One Day Suddenly (2006)
- My Husband's Woman (2007)
- Daughters-in-Law (2007)
- Fly High (2007)
- I Am Happy (2008)
- East of Eden (2008)
- All About My Family (2008)
- The Kingdom of the Winds (2008)
- General Hospital 2 (2008)
- Jolly Widows (2009)
- Hometown Legends – "Myo-jeong's Pearl" (2009)
- Kim Su-ro, The Iron King (2010)
- Gloria (2010)
- The King of Legend (2010)
- Lights and Shadows (2011)
- Goddess of Fire (2013)
- Master's Sun (2013)
- The Eldest (2013)
- Tears of Heaven (2014)
- 4 Legendary Witches (2014)
- The Great Wives (2015)
- The Promise (2016)
- School 2017 (2017)
- Hide and Seek (2018)
- Young Lady and Gentleman (2021–2022)
- Woman in a Veil (2023)
- Bumpy Family (2023–2024)

=== Films ===
- Unfinished Song, My Love (1987)
- Teenage Coup (1991)
- Green Sleeves (1991)
- Couple By Contract (1994)
- Ardor (2002)
- Mr. Butterfly (2003)
- Come Tomorrow (2003)
- Flying Boys (2004)

== Awards and nominations ==
Year	Award	Category	Nominated work	Result
2009	KBS Drama Awards	Excellence Award, Actor in a Daily Drama	Jolly Widows	Nominated
2012	MBC Drama Awards	Excellence Award, Actor in a Special Project Drama	Lights and Shadows	Nominated
2021	KBS Drama Awards	Best Supporting Actor	Young Lady and Gentleman	Nominated
