= Red Shoes (TV series) =

2021 South Korean television daily drama

- Promotional poster
- Hangul: 빨강 구두
- RR: Ppalgang gudu
- MR: Ppalgang kudu
- Genre: Family drama; Melodrama; Revenge; Romance
- Created by: Lee Jung-mi; Jung Woo-jin; KBS Drama Division
- Written by: Hwang Soon-young
- Directed by: Park Gi-hyeon
- Starring: Choi Myung-gil; So Yi-hyun; Park Yoon-jae
- Composer: Choi In-hee
- Country of origin: South Korea
- Original language: Korean
- No. of episodes: 100

Production
- Executive producers: Hong Seok-gu (KBS); Hwang Joon-young
- Producers: Sohn Seok-jin; Sohn Ok-hyeon; Lee Seung-beom
- Camera setup: Single-camera
- Running time: 40 minutes
- Production company: OH Story

Original release
- Network: KBS2
- Release: July 5 – December 10, 2021

Red Shoes (Korean: 빨강 구두; RR: Ppalgang gudu) is a 2021 South Korean television series starring Choi Myung-gil, So Yi-hyun and Park Yoon-jae. The series, directed by Park Gi-hyeon and written by Hwang Soon-young, tells the story of a daughter who seeks to take revenge on her heartless mother, who left her father and brother in search of love and success. The daily drama premiered on KBS2 on July 5 and aired on every weekday at 19:50 (KST) till December 10, 2021.

== Synopsis ==
The series revolves around Kim Jem-ma (So Yi-hyun), a daughter who has a strong desire to take revenge on her heartless mother, who left her father and brother in search of love and success.

Choi Myung-gil portrays Min Hee-kyeong, Kim Jem-ma's cold-hearted mother, who abandons her family after reuniting with her first love. Kim Jem-ma seeks to find out the secrets related to, and to avenge, her father's death. Yoon Gi-seok (portrayed by Park Yoon-jae) does not believe in love due to his wife's betrayal, but falls in love with Kim Jem-ma. Yoon Hyeon-seok (Shin Jung-yoon) is Yoon Gi-seok's younger brother, with free soul and defiant charm.

The title of the series as explained by the writer Hwang Soon-young: "The day the main character woman was kicked out of her house by her husband, she comes out wearing the 'red shoes' that a man in the past gave her. And the last gift she left for her daughter is a necklace of red shoe accessories. If the 'red shoes' are 'desire' for the mother, it becomes 'revenge' for the daughter."

== Cast ==
=== Main ===
- Choi Myung-gil as Min Hee-kyeong, Kim Jem-ma's mother

She has her desires and instincts and transforms from the past when she was tied to the roles of mother and wife, leader in the shoe industry with the name 'Laura'

- So Yi-hyun as Kim Jem-ma

Daughter of Kim Jeong-guk and Min Hee-kyeong, Min Hee-kyeong disappears one night, her father is killed in a hit and run case, she grows up as the adopted daughter of the aunt Ok-kyung next door

- Park Yoon-jae as Yoon Gi-seok

Grandson of Choi Sook-ja, representative of the fusion Korean restaurant. Afraid of love due to the betrayal of his former wife, closed the door to his heart due to the wounds of the past

- Shin Jung-yoon as Yoon Hyeon-seok, Yoon Gi-seok's younger brother, the second grandson of Choi Sook-ja
- Jung Yoo-min as Kwon Hye-bin, Kim Jem-ma's half-sister

A gold spoon princess character, born late to CEO Kwon Hyuk-sang and Min Hee-kyung, and grew up only being cute

=== Supporting ===
==== People around Kim Jem-ma ====
- Yang Geum-seok as Lee Kyung-hee
- Yang Seon-hee as Lee Sook

So Ok-kyung's social friend, older sister, and rival, sells coffee in the same traditional market

- Kyeong In-seon as So Ok-kyung
- Kim Kwang-young as So Tae-gil

A white-bearded gangster who lives with his older sister Ok-kyung

- Ji Ji-yoon as Lee Kun-wook, So Ok-kyung's son of a wealthy man.
- Ha Eun-jin as Jung Yoo-kyung

Kim Jem-ma's best friend and Lee Kun-wook's girlfriend

==== People around Min Hee-kyeong ====
- Sunwoo Jae-duk as Kwon Hyuk-sang

Min Hee-kyeong's former lover, current husband

- Choi Yeong-wan as Kwon Soo-yeon

Kwon Hyuk-sang's younger sister

- Ban Hyo-jung as Choi Sook-ja

A famous big fish in the underground lending industry. Kim Jem-ma's long-lost adoptive grandmother.

- Kim Kyu-chul as Kim Jeong-guk, Min Hee-kyung's husband
- Hwang Dong-ju as Kwon Joo-hyeong

=== Others ===
- Kim Yu-seok as Kwon Seok-hwan
- Park Chan-hwan as Mi Jeong
- Kim Ri-won as Ye Won
- Han In-soo as Yoon Jin-beom
- Seo Kwon-soon
- Han Chae-kyung as Go Eun-cho, Yoon Gi-seok's ex-wife, disappeared before, now reappears

=== Special appearance ===
- Park Geon-il as Jin-ho, younger brother of Kim Jem-ma

== Production ==
=== Casting ===
So Yi-hyun was confirmed to appear in the revenge series in May 2021. She last appeared in 2016 KBS daily drama Secrets of Women. It is her comeback after five years. A script reading session was held on May 18 in KBS studio. Script writer Hwang Soon-Young has written three daily dramas, 2013 series Ruby Ring, 2014 series Two Mothers and 2015 series The Great Wives. Jung Yoo-min and director Park Gi-hyeon are working together for third time. Their previous two series are: Unasked Family (2019) and 2020 KBS Drama Special, Season 11 episode "My Lilac". First joint script reading session was held on June 14.

=== Filming ===
On June 16, KBS released first stills of So Yi-hyun from the filming of drama. On August 19, a confirmed case of COVID-19 was reported from the filming site of the TV series. An actor, who came in contact with that person has been sent under self-quarantine.

== Original soundtrack ==
Red Shoes

Soundtrack album by Various Artists
- Released: 2021
- Genre: Soundtrack
- Languages: Korean; English
- Labels: Danal Entertainment; Plus Media

=== Part 1 ===
Released on July 10, 2021
No.	Title	Lyrics	Music	Artist	Length
1.	"Bad Girls" (나쁜 여자 (소찬휘))	Kang Woo-Kyung	Park Hyeon-Am	So Chan-whee	3:10
2.	"Bad Girls" (Inst.)		Park Hyeon-Am		3:10

=== Part 2 ===
Released on July 17, 2021
No.	Title	Lyrics	Music	Artist	Length
1.	"It Was Tears" (눈물이었다 (장희영))	Kang Woo-Kyung	Park Hyeon-Am	Jang Hee-young	3:18
2.	"It Was Tears" (Inst.)		Park Hyeon-Am		3:18

=== Part 3 ===
Released on July 24, 2021
No.	Title	Lyrics	Music	Artist	Length
1.	"I must erase my heart to forget it" (타이틀 심장도 지워야 잊나봐 (황가람))	Honsu Sang-tae	Algoboni, Honsu Sang-tae, Hun Choe-cheol	Hwang Ga-ram	3:40
2.	"I must erase my heart to forget it" (Inst.)				3:40

=== Part 4 ===
Released on July 31, 2021
No.	Title	Lyrics	Music	Artist	Length
1.	"I loved you, Why Did You Leave" (타이틀 사랑했는데 왜 떠나서)	Honsu sang-tae	Algoboni, Honsu sang-tae, Choi Cheol-hoon	J-Sera	4:02
2.	"I loved you, Why Did You Leave" (Inst.)				4:02

=== Part 5 ===
Released on August 7, 2021
No.	Title	Lyrics	Music	Artist	Length
1.	"My Heart Keeps Going" (자꾸 마음이 가)	Burning Sweet Potato (Kim Seon-Yeop, Lee Sang-Min)	Burning Sweet Potato (Kim Seon-Yeop, Lee Sang-Min Lee)	Ji Yeon	3:34
2.	"My Heart Keeps Going" (Inst.)				3:34

=== Part 6 ===
Released on August 14, 2021
No.	Title	Lyrics	Music	Artist	Length
1.	"'cause I'll be Sicker" (내가 더 아플 테니까)	Kang Woo-kyung	Choi Byung-chang	Shin-yu	4:09
2.	"Because I'll Hurt More" (Inst.)				4:09

=== Part 7 ===
Released on August 21, 2021
No.	Title	Lyrics	Music	Artist	Length
1.	"One love"	Honggom, Ju Jin-hee	Honggom, Ju Jin-hee	Yeo Eun	3:28
2.	"One love" (Inst.)				3:28

=== Part 8 ===
Released on August 28, 2021
No.	Title	Lyrics	Music	Artist	Length
1.	"Bloom" (피어나)	Win and Lose, Jamie	Win and Lose, Jamie	The Daisy	4:07
2.	"Bloom" (Inst.)				4:06

=== Part 9 ===
Released on September 4, 2021
No.	Title	Lyrics	Music	Artist	Length
1.	"I Remember You ..." (그대 생각나…)	Turns coma, Choecheolhun	Turns coma, Choecheolhun	Jang Hee-young	3:40
2.	"I Remember You ..." (Inst.)				3:40

=== Part 10 ===
Released on September 11, 2021
No.	Title	Lyrics	Music	Artist	Length
1.	"In Your Time" (너의 시간에)	OneK, Choi Seungil	OneK, HBLR, MOOK	OneK (one.k)
2.	"In Your Time" (Inst.)

=== Part 11 ===
Released on September 18, 2021
No.	Title	Lyrics	Music	Artist	Length
1.	"All Days Together" (함께였던 모든 날)	Invincible, Jamie	Invincible, Jamie	Woo Yi Kyung
2.	"All Days Together" (Inst.)

=== Part 12 ===
Released on September 22, 2021
No.	Title	Lyrics	Music	Artist	Length
1.	"I Loved You So Much" (참 사랑했었는데)	Absolute Victory, Jamie	Absolute Victory, Jamie	Morning Coffee
2.	"I Loved You So Much" (Inst.)

=== Part 13 ===
Released on September 25, 2021
No.	Title	Lyrics	Music	Artist	Length
1.	"You are in Me" (내 안에 넌 그대로)	Undefeated, Sok Sok-hee	Undefeated, Sok Sok-hee, Lee Joo-yong	Kim Min-wool	4:08
2.	"You are in Me" (Inst.)				4:08

=== Part 14 ===
Released on October 2, 2021
No.	Title	Lyrics	Music	Artist	Length
1.	"I Can't Break Up" (헤어질 수 없어요)	Undefeated, Jamie Lee Ju-yong	Undefeated, Jamie Lee Ju-yong	Han Kyung-il	3:14
2.	"I Can't Break Up" (Inst.)		Undefeated, Jamie Lee Ju-yong		3:14

=== Part 15 ===
Released on October 9, 2021
No.	Title	Lyrics	Music	Artist	Length
1.	"How Can I Forget You" (어떻게 그대를 잊을 수 있을까요)	Hwang Seong-jin, Jeong Jeong- ni	Absolute Victory	Lydia	3:30
2.	"How Can I Forget You" (Inst.)		Absolute Victory		3:30

=== Part 16 ===
Released on October 11, 2021
No.	Title	Lyrics	Music	Artist	Length
1.	"Love Please" (사랑아 제발)	Algo Boni Coma, Counter Punch, Park Ye-ji	Algo Boni Coma, Counter Punch, Park Ye-ji	Coda Bridge	3:52
2.	"Love Please" (Inst.)				3:52

=== Part 17 ===
Released on October 16, 2021
No.	Title	Lyrics	Music	Artist	Length
1.	"I Wish You" (바래요)	Invincible, Jamie	Invincible, Jamie, Lee Ju-yong	RAN	3:23
2.	"I Wish You" (Inst.)				3:23

=== Part 18 ===
Released on October 23, 2021
No.	Title	Lyrics	Music	Artist	Length
1.	"Clumsy Love" (서툰 사랑)	Immortal, Jamie, Americano	Impossible, Jamie, Lee Joo-Yong	Vivian (BBAHN)	4:05
2.	"Clumsy Love" (Inst.)				4:05

=== Part 19 ===
Released on October 30, 2021
No.	Title	Lyrics	Music	Artist	Length
1.	"I'll be There for you"	Major Leaguers, Seong-Hyun	Major Leaguers, Chi-Yong Park	Seo J	4:07
2.	"I'll be There for you" (Inst.)				4:07

=== Part 20 ===
Released on November 1, 2021
No.	Title	Lyrics	Music	Artist	Length
1.	"Over the Sea"	Major Leaguers, Park Seong- mi	Lee Yong-joo, Major leaguer, Hong Eun-mi	Hannah Yang	3:56
2.	"Over the Sea" (Inst.)				3:56

=== Part 21 ===
Released on November 6, 2021
No.	Title	Lyrics	Music	Artist	Length
1.	"Winter Night" (겨울밤)	Major Leaguers, Jiyeon Seo	Major Leaguers, Heonje Ha, Jiyeon Seo	Sook Haeng	3:20
2.	"Winter Night" (Inst.)				3:20

=== Part 22 ===
Released on November 10, 2021
No.	Title	Lyrics	Music	Artist	Length
1.	"It's My Fault" (내 잘못이죠)	Invincible, Jamie	Invincible, Jamie, Lee Ju-yong	Cheon Soa	3:43
2.	"It's My Fault" (Inst.)				3:43

=== Part 23 ===
Released on November 13, 2021
No.	Title	Lyrics	Music	Artist	Length
1.	"Why Did You Leave Me Like That" (왜 날 그렇게 떠나갔니)	Invincible, Sok Sok	Invincible, Sok Sok, LeeJu- yong	The Bridge	4:01
2.	"Why Did You Leave Me Like That" (Inst.)				4:01

=== Part 24 ===
Released on November 20, 2021
No.	Title	Lyrics	Music	Artist	Length
1.	"A Pretty Good Day" (꽤나 괜찮았던 하루)	Major Leaguer	Major Leaguer, Jung Mi-hyun	Jang Hyeri	4:23
2.	"A Pretty Good Day" (Inst.)		Major Leaguer, Jung Mi-hyun		4:23

=== Part 25 ===
Released on November 23, 2021
No.	Title	Lyrics	Music	Artist	Length
1.	"I Keep Having Sad Expectations" (슬픈 기대만 자꾸 하게 돼)	Bad Boss, Kaiser	Bad Boss, Kaiser	Club Soul	3:54
2.	"I Keep Having Sad Expectations" (Inst.)		Bad Boss, Kaiser		3:54

=== Part 26 ===
Released on November 27, 2021
No.	Title	Lyrics	Music	Artist	Length
1.	"I'm Afraid I'll Never See You Again" (다신 못 볼까 봐)	Immortal, Jamie	Immortal, Jamie, Lee Ju-yong	Yoon Tae-Hwa	4:50
2.	"I'm Afraid I'll Never See You Again" (Inst.)		Immortal, Jamie, Lee Ju-yong		4:50

=== Part 27 ===
Released on December 2, 2021
No.	Title	Lyrics	Music	Artist	Length
1.	"Take My Hand Once Again" (다시 한번 내 손을 잡아요)	Immortal, Jamie	Immortal, Jamie, Lee Ju-yong	So Young	3:40
2.	"Take My Hand Once Again" (Inst.)		Immortal, Jamie, Lee Ju-yong		3:40

=== Part 28 ===
Released on December 4, 2021
No.	Title	Lyrics	Music	Artist	Length
1.	"That Person" (그 사람)	Immortal, Jamie	Immortal, Jamie, Lee Ju-yong	Song Min-kyung	3:58
2.	"That Person" (Inst.)		Immortal, Jamie, Lee Ju-yong		3:58

=== Part 29 ===
Released on December 6, 2021
No.	Title	Lyrics	Music	Artist	Length
1.	"Your Season" (당신의 계절)	Park Seongmi	Major Leaguer, Park Seongmi	Hansal Chai	3:15
2.	"Your Season" (Inst.)				3:15

=== Part 30 ===
Released on December 9, 2021
No.	Title	Lyrics	Music	Artist	Length
1.	"Walking in Winter" (겨울을 걷다)	Raeun (Chic Angel)	Lee Hyun-soo	Seunghan	3:13
2.	"Walking in Winter" (Inst.)		Lee Hyun-soo		3:13

=== Part 31 ===
Released on December 10, 2021
No.	Title	Lyrics	Music	Artist	Length
1.	"Bestie"	Major Leaguer, Yoon Min-hee	Major Leaguer, Hong Eun-mi, Buzzer Beater	An Ye-seul	3:42
2.	"Bestie" (Inst.)		Major Leaguer, Hong Eun-mi, Buzzer Beater		3:42

== Viewership ==
Red Shoes : South Korea viewers per episode (millions)

Episodes	Episode number																			
Episodes	1	2	3	4	5	6	7	8	9	10	11	12	13	14	15	16	17	18	19	20
1–20	2.015	1.883	2.008	1.914	1.946	2.249	2.013	2.133	1.973	2.204	2.216	2.239	2.493	2.129	2.051	2.270	2.309	2.421	2.280	2.257
21–40	2.474	2.547	2.511	2.518	2.493	2.821	2.560	2.436	2.539	2.545	2.772	2.697	2.518	2.476	2.737	2.707	2.655	2.594	2.579	2.538
41–60	2.680	2.685	2.715	2.555	2.428	2.697	2.716	2.581	2.787	2.798	2.704	2.622	2.880	2.801	2.680	2.560	2.544	2.845	2.727	2.694
61–80	2.609	2.517	2.703	2.630	2.492	2.648	2.570	2.661	2.632	2.706	2.564	2.637	2.679	2.712	2.654	2.708	2.488	2.913	2.778	2.571
81–100	2.659	2.762	2.636	2.635	2.677	2.869	2.673	2.794	2.794	2.578	2.753	2.881	2.821	2.802	2.745	2.788	3.033	2.846	2.880	3.074

Source: Audience measurement performed nationwide by °Nielsen Korea.

Ep.	Original broadcast date	Average audience share		
Ep.	Original broadcast date	Nielsen Korea		TNmS
Ep.	Original broadcast date	Nationwide	Seoul	Nationwide
1	July 5, 2021	12.8%	10.9%	14.3%
2	July 6, 2021	12.0%	10.2%	13.0%
3	July 7, 2021	12.2%	10.4%	13.2%
4	July 8, 2021	12.0%	10.5%	12.1%
5	July 9, 2021	11.6%	9.8%	13.6%
6	July 12, 2021	13.1%	11.5%	14.7%
7	July 14, 2021 (Note: The episode on July 13, 2021 was cancelled due to Live broadcast of Korea vs. Argentina evaluation soccer game.)	12.3%	10.7%	14.0%
8	July 15, 2021	13.3%	12.1%	15.4%
9	July 16, 2021	12.8%	11.1%	14.7%
10	July 19, 2021	13.4%	12.2%	14.8%
11	July 20, 2021	14.0%	13.2%	15.1%
12	July 21, 2021	13.8%	12.4%	14.9%
13	July 22, 2021	15.0%	13.2%	16.4%
14	July 23, 2021	12.3%	10.7%	14.4%
15	August 9, 2021 (Note: The episode on July 26 to August 6, 2021 will not be aired due to coverage of the 2020 Summer Olympics. It will resume airing from August 9.)	12.6%	11.3%	—N/a
16	August 10, 2021	13.9%	12.1%	—N/a
17	August 11, 2021	13.9%	12.3%	—N/a
18	August 12, 2021	14.6%	12.8%	—N/a
19	August 13, 2021	14.2%	12.8%	16.6%
20	August 16, 2021	14.2%	13.5%	15.6%
21	August 17, 2021	15.2%	13.6%	16.1%
22	August 18, 2021	15.8%	13.7%	15.7%
23	August 19, 2021	15.1%	13.0%	16.5%
24	August 20, 2021	15.4%	14.0%	16.0%
25	August 23, 2021	15.9%	14.1%	17.8%
26	August 24, 2021	17.6%	15.8%	18.4%
27	August 25, 2021	16.2%	13.8%	16.5%
28	August 26, 2021	15.3%	13.5%	17.1%
29	August 27, 2021	16.1%	14.0%	17.0%
30	August 30, 2021	15.8%	13.9%	16.7%
31	August 31, 2021	17.0%	14.5%	17.7%
32	September 1, 2021	16.9%	14.5%	17.4%
33	September 2, 2021	15.9%	13.6%	15.8%
34	September 3, 2021	15.9%	14.0%	17.0%
35	September 6, 2021	16.8%	14.2%	17.4%
36	September 7, 2021	17.0%	15.0%	16.4%
37	September 8, 2021	16.2%	14.3%	17.0%
38	September 9, 2021	15.9%	14.0%	16.4%
39	September 10, 2021	15.8%	13.7%	—N/a
40	September 13, 2021	16.5%	14.3%	17.4%
41	September 14, 2021	16.7%	15.0%	17.1%
42	September 15, 2021	16.3%	13.8%	17.7%
43	September 16, 2021	16.6%	14.5%	16.3%
44	September 17, 2021	16.0%	13.8%	15.9%
45	September 22, 2021	15.6%	14.0%	14.9%
46	September 23, 2021	17.0%	15.3%	16.9%
47	September 24, 2021	16.7%	14.8%	17.0%
48	September 27, 2021	16.7%	14.2%	17.5%
49	September 28, 2021	17.5%	14.9%	17.5%
50	September 29, 2021	17.5%	15.4%	17.2%
51	September 30, 2021	16.6%	14.4%	17.2%
52	October 1, 2021	16.5%	14.9%	16.9%
53	October 4, 2021	17.4%	15.0%	17.1%
54	October 5, 2021	16.7%	13.9%	17.6%
55	October 6, 2021	16.4%	14.2%	17.5%
56	October 7, 2021	16.0%	13.4%	17.4%
57	October 8, 2021	15.4%	12.8%	16.4%
58	October 11, 2021	17.3%	14.7%	17.6%
59	October 12, 2021	16.8%	14.1%	17.1%
60	October 13, 2021	17.0%	14.6%	17.0%
61	October 14, 2021	16.0%	14.1%	17.1%
62	October 15, 2021	16.0%	13.1%	17.3%
63	October 18, 2021	16.9%	14.8%	18.1%
64	October 19, 2021	16.4%	13.7%	17.1%
65	October 20, 2021	16.2%	14.6%	17.2%
66	October 21, 2021	16.8%	13.8%	17.9%
67	October 22, 2021	16.9%	14.2%	17.0%
68	October 25, 2021	16.1%	13.1%	17.8%
69	October 26, 2021	17.0%	14.1%	17.6%
70	October 27, 2021	16.2%	13.5%	17.5%
71	October 28, 2021	15.9%	14.2%	18.1%
72	October 29, 2021	16.8%	14.6%	17.9%
73	November 1, 2021	16.7%	13.9%	19.2%
74	November 2, 2021	17.2%	14.9%	18.9%
75	November 3, 2021	16.7%	13.2%	19.0%
76	November 4, 2021	17.2%	14.8%	18.3%
77	November 5, 2021	16.1%	13.2%	18.3%
78	November 8, 2021	17.5%	15.6%	18.9%
79	November 10, 2021	17.4%	14.6%	18.5%
80	November 11, 2021	16.9%	14.2%	18.5%
81	November 12, 2021	17.0%	14.4%	—N/a
82	November 16, 2021	17.1%	14.0%	18.9%
83	November 17, 2021	16.8%	13.9%	18.2%
84	November 18, 2021	17.5%	14.8%	18.8%
85	November 19, 2021	17.1%	15.2%	19.0%
86	November 22, 2021	18.6%	16.0%	19.5%
87	November 23, 2021	17.2%	14.3%	18.6%
88	November 24, 2021	17.6%	14.6%	19.2%
89	November 25, 2021	17.6%	15.6%	18.1%
90	November 26, 2021	17.1%	14.6%	18.2%
91	November 29, 2021	17.1%	14.8%	18.0%
92	November 30, 2021	18.2%	15.5%	17.9%
93	December 1, 2021	18.0%	14.7%	17.5%
94	December 2, 2021	18.1%	15.4%	17.9%
95	December 3, 2021	17.4%	15.2%	—N/a
96	December 6, 2021	17.9%	15.0%	17.4%
97	December 7, 2021	19.2%	17.2%	—N/a
98	December 8, 2021	18.6%	15.5%	19.9%
99	December 9, 2021	19.0%	16.1%	19.9%
100	December 10, 2021	19.6%	17.1%	19.9%
Average		—	—	—
In this table, the blue numbers represent the lowest ratings and the red numbers represent the highest ratings.; N/A denotes that the rating is not known.

== Awards and nominations ==
Year	Award	Category	Recipient	Result	Ref.
2021	KBS Drama Awards	Excellence Award, Actress in a Daily Drama	So Yi-hyun	Won	
2021	KBS Drama Awards	Excellence Award, Actress in a Daily Drama	Choi Myung-gil	Nominated	
2021	KBS Drama Awards	Top Excellence Award, Actress	Choi Myung-gil	Nominated	
2021	KBS Drama Awards	Excellence Award, Actor in a Daily Drama	Sunwoo Jae-duk	Nominated	
2022	APAN Star Awards	Top Excellence Award, Actress in a Serial Drama	Choi Myung-gil	Nominated	
2022	APAN Star Awards	Excellence Award, Actress in a Serial Drama	So Yi-hyun	Won	
