= My Tutor Friend 2 =

- My Tutor Friend 2 poster (2007)
- Hangul: 동갑내기 과외하기 레슨 II
- Hanja: 同甲내기 課外하기 레슨 II
- RR: Donggamnaegi gwaoehagi reseun II
- MR: Tonggamnaegi kwaoehagi resŭn II
- Directed by: Kim Ho-jung; Ji Kil-woong
- Written by: Choi Won; In Eun-ah; Jo Joong-hoon
- Produced by: Baek Jong-jin; Lee Seo-yeol; Jeong Geun-hyeon; Kim Jae-hong
- Starring: Lee Chung-ah; Park Ki-woong
- Cinematography: Ji Kil-woong
- Edited by: Moon In-dae
- Music by: Kim Bong-soo
- Distributed by: CJ Entertainment
- Release date: April 19, 2007
- Running time: 125 minutes
- Country: South Korea
- Language: Korean

My Tutor Friend 2 (Korean: 동갑내기 과외하기 레슨 II; lit. 'Tutoring a Friend of My Age Lesson 2') is a 2007 South Korean romantic comedy film released on April 19, 2007.

It was promoted as a sequel to the 2003 movie My Tutor Friend, but the films' characters and plots are unrelated, and only share the basic premise of a boy and girl of the same age that happen to meet as student and tutor, and later fall in love.

== Plot ==
My Tutor Friend 2 follows Junko (Lee Chung-ah), a Japanese exchange student of Korean descent, who arrives in Seoul hoping to reconnect with a Korean guy she met in Japan. She checks into a guesthouse expecting a private room, only to find it already occupied by Jong-man (Park Ki-woong), the abrasive and lazy son of the owner. When Junko threatens to leave, the guesthouse owner persuades her to stay by offering free Korean lessons from Jong-man, who is in debt and has no choice but to agree.

Junko and Jong-man start off on the wrong foot. She’s eager to learn the language and adapt, while he’s indifferent and unwilling to help. Their tutor-student dynamic is filled with miscommunication, personality clashes, and comedic misunderstandings. However, as time passes, their tension gives way to growing affection, and the two slowly start to fall for each other.

Although marketed as a sequel to My Tutor Friend (2003), the film tells a completely separate story with new characters, sharing only the tutoring premise. Filled with humor, cultural clashes, and a sweet slow-burn romance, My Tutor Friend 2 delivers a light and heartwarming take on unexpected love and self-discovery in a foreign land.

== Cast ==
- Lee Chung-ah - Junko
- Park Ki-woong - Jong-man
- Lee Young-ha - Heo Ha-ryong
- Yoon Young-sam - Sung Moon-ran
- Julian Quintart - George
- Jo Dal-hwan - Seon Poong-gi
- Jang Young-ran - assistant teacher Hee-jung
- Yang Geum-seok - Dong-wook's mother
- Baek Seung-woo - Lee Dong-wook
- Yang Jin-woo - Jung Woo-sung
- Shin Cheol-jin - Professor
- Choi Il-hwa - Junko's father
- Ah Yong-joo - gang boss
- Shin Jung-geun - film professor
- Jung Jae-hoon - gunman
- Jung Eun-woo - Woo-sung's friend
- Shin Cheol-jin - Professor
- Lee Joo-yeon - Azumi
- Kim Tan-hyun - cop 1
- Kim Kwang-sik - drunk man 1
- Jung Dae-yong - drunk man 2
- Lee Won - wine bar employee
