= Wanted (South Korean TV series) =

2016 South Korean series by Park Yong-soon

- Promotional poster
- Genre: Thriller; Crime
- Developed by: Park Young-soo (SBS Drama Production)
- Written by: Han Ji-wan
- Directed by: Park Yong-soon
- Starring: Kim Ah-joong; Ji Hyun-woo; Uhm Tae-woong; Park Hae-joon
- Country of origin: South Korea
- Original language: Korean
- No. of episodes: 16

Production
- Executive producers: Jung Ah-reum; Park Hyun-seo; Sim Jae-hyun
- Producer: Jo Sung-hoon
- Cinematography: Hong Sung-gil; Lee Moo-jin; Lee Young-cheol
- Editor: Bang Soo-yeon
- Running time: 60 minutes
- Production companies: Imagine Asia; Happy Campus Projects

Original release
- Network: SBS TV
- Release: June 22 – August 18, 2016

Wanted (Korean: 원티드) is a 2016 South Korean television series starring Kim Ah-joong, Ji Hyun-woo, Uhm Tae-woong and Park Hae-joon. It aired on SBS TV on Wednesdays and Thursdays at 21:55 (KST) from June 22 to August 18, 2016 for 16 episodes.

== Plot ==
Jung Hye-in (Kim Ah-joong) is a top actress in Korea who reigns over dramas, movies, and commercials. The drama begins when Jung Hye-in's son is kidnapped on the day she announces her retirement. With the help of PD Shin Dong-wook (Uhm Tae-woong) and police detective Cha Seung-in (Ji Hyun-woo), she ends up participating in a live reality show where she follows the kidnapper's orders, and in the process uncovers clues towards catching the culprit and finding her son.

== Cast ==
=== Main cast ===
- Kim Ah-joong as Jung Hye-in – 35-year-old, actress
- Ji Hyun-woo as Cha Seung-in – 33-year-old, detective of Kangnam Police station's homicide investigation team
- Uhm Tae-woong as Shin Dong-wook – 38-year-old, "Jung Hye-in's Wanted" PD
- Park Hae-joon as Song Jeong-ho – 42-year-old, Hye-in's husband, UCN's CEO

=== Broadcast production member ===
- Lee Moon-sik as Choi Joon-goo – 48-year-old, Head of UCN Drama Bureau, "Wanted" executive producer
- Park Hyo-joo as Yeon Woo-shin – 35-year-old, freelance broadcasting writer
- Jun Hyo-seong as Park Bo-yeon – 26-year-old, assistant director

=== Investigation team ===
- Shin Jae-ha as Lee Young-gwan – 27-year-old, Kangnam Police station's homicide investigation team newcomer, Seung-in's partner
- Kim Sun-young as Oh Mi-ok – 39-year-old, profiler, inspector of Police Hall's crime information support section
- Kim Byeong-ok as Jung Jung-ki – 54-year-old, Kangnam Police station's homicide investigation team leader
- Ji Hyun-joon as Park Young-sik – 38-year-old, detective of Kangnam Police station's homicide investigation team
- Jo Ji-hwan as Yoo Dong-joon – 31-year-old, detective of Kangnam Police station's homicide investigation team

=== People around Jung Hye-in ===
- Bae Yoo-ram as Kwon Kyung-hoon – 25-year-old, Hye-in's manager
- Lee Seung-joon as Jang Jin-woong – 36-year-old, internet entertainment show "Star Live" reporter
- Park Ho-san as Ham Tae-seop – SG Group CEO, Tae-young's older brother
- Park Min-su as Song Hyun-woo – 7-year-old, Jeong-ho and Hye-in's son

=== Events and mission-related people ===
- Han Geun-seop as Park Se-hyung – Hyun-woo kidnap's suspect
- Shim Eun-woo as Lee Ji-eun – BJ
- Jung Wook as Kim Woo-jin – teacher, Han-sol's father (first mission)
- Kim Ye-jun as Kim Han-sol – child found in the car trunk (first mission)
- Son Jong-hak as Ha Dong-min – Soo Jeong Hospital's Head of Pediatrics (second mission)
- Han Min as Kim Sang-mi – Soo Jeong Hospital nurse (second mission)
- N/A as Kim Hae-joo – people who solicited the killing of Kim Sang-mi (second mission)
- Park Sang-wook as Jo Nam-cheol – old hand
- Choo Gyo-jin as Im Hyung-soon – people who was killed by Jo Nam-cheol
- Ahn Soo-bin as Kim Yang-hee – Jo Nam-cheol's girlfriend
- Seo Hyun-chul as Kim Sang-sik – Jo Seung-in's police senior
- Lee Jae-gyun as Na Soo-hyun – coffee shop's part-time staff
- Park Sung-geun as Go Hyung-joon – detective investigating the disappearance of Na Jae-hyun
- Jin Hyun-kwang as Moon Sung-hyuk
- Jang Joon-ho as Lee Yong-hwan – Lee Ji-eun's father
- Choi Hong-il as Lee Tae-gyun – Police Hall chief
- Han Ga-rim as Kim So-hyun – Song Jeong-ho's lady
- Baek Seung-hyeon as Choi Pil-gyu – lawyer
- Lee Jae-woo as Ham Tae-young – Jung Hye-in's deceased husband, Hyun-woo's biological father

=== Extended cast ===
- Ri Min as Kim Hong-joon – director of film "Mother" in which starred Jung Hye-in
- Jung Hyun-seok as Broadcasting PD – successor PD of the program directed by Shin Dong-wook
- Lee Chang as talk show "Kiss and Talk" PD
- Kim Sung-kyung as talk show "Kiss and Talk" MC
- Joo Woo-jae as talk show "Kiss and Talk" guest
- Hwang Young-hee as internet entertainment show "Star Live" editor-in-chief
- Yeo Woon-bok as debate program's police panelist
- Go In-beom as Cha Seung-in's father
- Shin Young-jin as autopsy responsibility
- Kang Chan-yang as nurse
- Choi Yoo-ri as Na Young-hyun – Na Soo-hyun's younger sister
- Oh Hee-joon as Pierrot
- Kim Min-sang as Kaepko
- Kang Heon as convenience store's customer
- Song Young-gyu
- Kim Jeong-hak
- Son Seon-geun as Police Hall deputy
- Kang Dong-yeop as Kim Sang-oh – Ham Tae-seop's lawyer
- Sung Min-soo as Kang Young-min – Internal Affairs Department's police officer
- Jung Dong-gyu
- Kim Ji-eun as Nurse

== Ratings ==
In the table below, the blue numbers represent the lowest ratings and the red numbers represent the highest ratings.

Episode #	Original broadcast date	Average audience share			
Episode #	Original broadcast date	TNmS Ratings		AGB Nielsen	
Episode #	Original broadcast date	Nationwide	Seoul National Capital Area	Nationwide	Seoul National Capital Area
1	June 22, 2016	6.9%	8.9%	5.9%	6.7%
2	June 23, 2016	6.6%	8.4%	7.8%	8.2%
3	June 29, 2016	6.2%	7.9%	6.7%	8.0%
4	June 30, 2016	7.0%	8.6%	7.6%	8.6%
5	July 6, 2016	5.7%	7.3%	7.0%	7.5%
6	July 7, 2016	8.4%	10.0%	7.1%	7.9%
7	July 13, 2016	7.1%	8.8%	7.7%	9.0%
8	July 14, 2016	7.2%	9.2%	7.7%	9.0%
9	July 20, 2016	5.5%	6.7%	5.4%	6.0%
10	July 21, 2016	6.9%	8.7%	6.5%	7.4%
11	July 27, 2016	5.8%	7.8%	6.0%	7.1%
12	July 28, 2016	6.7%	8.3%	6.5%	7.5%
13	August 3, 2016	5.3%	7.1%	5.2%	5.8%
14	August 4, 2016	6.1%	7.3%	5.2%	5.4%
15	August 17, 2016	4.7%	6.1%	4.7%	<6.9%
16	August 18, 2016	5.1%	6.7%	4.9%	<6.7%
Average		6.33%	7.99%	6.37%	<7.36%

== Remark ==
- Episode 15 and 16 wasn't aired on August 10 and 11 due to broadcast of the 2016 Summer Olympics in Rio de Janeiro, Brazil. This episode was re-scheduled to be aired on August 17 and 18, 2016.

== Original soundtrack ==
=== OST Part 1 ===
No.	Title	Artist	Length
1.	"Broken"	Lydia Lee	3:45
2.	"Broken" (English Ver.)		3:45
3.	"Broken" (Inst.)		3:45
Total length:			11:15

=== OST Part 2 ===
No.	Title	Artist	Length
1.	"To You (나는 너에게)"	Ha Dong-kyun	3:47
2.	"To You (나는 너에게)" (Inst.)		3:47
Total length:			7:34

=== OST Part 3 ===
No.	Title	Artist	Length
1.	"Shadow (그림자)"	Yezi (Fiestar) & Jung Chae-yeon (DIA)	4:01
2.	"Shadow (그림자)" (Inst.)		4:01
Total length:			8:02

=== OST Part 4 ===
No.	Title	Artist	Length
1.	"Don't Leave Me (떠나지마)"	Hoon.J (훈 제이)	3:44
2.	"Don't Leave Me (떠나지마)" (Inst.)		3:44
Total length:			7:28

== Awards and nominations ==
Year	Award	Category	Recipient	Result
2016	5th APAN Star Awards	Excellence Award, Actress in a Miniseries	Kim Ah-joong	Nominated
2016	SBS Drama Awards	Excellence Award, Actress in a Genre Drama	Park Hyo-joo	Nominated
2016	SBS Drama Awards	Special Award, Actress in a Genre Drama	Jun Hyo-seong	Won
