= The Last Match =

1994 South Korean television series

- Poster
- Hangul: 마지막 승부
- RR: Majimak seungbu
- MR: Majimak sŭngbu
- Genre: Drama; Sports
- Starring: Jang Dong-gun; Son Ji-chang; Shim Eun-ha; Lee Sang-ah
- Country of origin: South Korea
- Original language: Korean
- No. of episodes: 16

Production
- Production location: South Korea
- Running time: 60 minutes Mondays and Tuesdays at 21:50 (KST)

Original release
- Network: MBC TV
- Release: January 3 – February 22, 1994

The Last Match (Korean: 마지막 승부; RR: Majimak seungbu) is a 1994 South Korean television series starring Jang Dong-gun, Son Ji-chang, Shim Eun-ha, and Lee Sang-ah. It aired on MBC on Mondays and Tuesdays at 21:50 for 16 episodes beginning January 3, 1994.

== Cast ==
=== Main ===
- Jang Dong-gun as Yoon Chul-joon
- Son Ji-chang as Lee Dong-min
- Shim Eun-ha as Jung Da-seul
- Lee Sang-ah as Choi Mi-joo

=== Supporting ===
Myung Sung University basketball team

- Park Hyung-joon as player #9
- Huh Joon-ho as player #10
- Song Ki-yoon as Myung-sun's coach

Han Young University basketball team

- Lee Jong-won as Kim Seon-jae
- Kang In-duk as Han-young's coach
- Jun In-taek as Han-young's coach

Other people

- Jang Hang-sun as Chul-joon's father (vegetable vendor)
- Shin Eun-kyung as Kim Soo-jin
- Park Chul
- Lee Dong-shin
- Lee Jung-hoon
- Park Jae-hoon
- Hong Yo-seob
