= Hong Yo-seob =

South Korean actor

- Born: Seoul, South Korea
- Education: Chung-Ang University - Theater and Film
- Occupation: Actor
- Years active: 1976–present

Korean name
- Hangul: 홍요섭
- Hanja: 洪耀燮
- RR: Hong Yoseop
- MR: Hong Yosŏp

Hong Yo-seob is a South Korean actor.

== Filmography ==
=== Television series ===
Year	Title	Role	Network
1983	Eun-ha's Dream		KBS1
1983	Eldest Daughter		KBS1
1984	The Person I Love	Ji Won-beom	KBS1
1986	Your Portrait	Ji-seob	KBS2
1987	Floating Weeds	Ha-myung	MBC
1987	Blue Sunflower		KBS1
1988	Golden Tower	Kyung So-yoon	KBS2
1988	Punggaek	Jang Woo-rim	KBS2
1989	Endless Love	Sung Yo-seob	KBS2
1990	People of Dangchu-dong		KBS2
1990	Guest in Autumn	Kang Min-gu	KBS2
1991	Yesterday's Green Grass	Yoon Young-joon	KBS1
1992	Women's Room	Jang Geon-young	MBC
1993	To the Lovely Others	Novelist	SBS
1994	The Last Match	College basketball coach	MBC
1994	I Want to Be Happy	Oh Kang-hoon	SBS
1994	The Road to You		KBS2
1995	The Road		KBS2
1995	Old House		KBS1
1996	Until We Can Love		KBS1
1997	Hometown Legends "Reaper's Smile"		KBS2
1997	Wedding Dress	Park Dal-soo	KBS2
1998	As We Live Our Lives		KBS1
1999	Now Is the Time to Love	Park Do-hoon	SBS
2000	Nice Man		SBS
2002	Successful Story of a Bright Girl	Director Oh	SBS
2002	Solitude	Kang Eun-seok	KBS2
2003	KBS TV Novel: Buni	Kang Tae-soo	KBS1
2004	My 19 Year Old Sister-in-Law	Jung Joon-seok	SBS
2006	Seoul 1945	Moon Dong-ki	KBS1
2007	Heaven & Earth	Seok Jong-hoon	KBS1
2009	Ja Myung Go	Choi Ri, King of Nakrang	SBS
2009	Jolly Widows	Kang Shin-wook/Han Tae-soo	KBS1
2010	Definitely Neighbors	Kim Woo-jin	SBS
2010	The President	Kim Kyung-mo	KBS2
2011	Just Like Today	Moon Sang-yub	MBC
2012	Seoyoung, My Daughter	Choi Min-seok	KBS2
2013	Shining Romance	Jang Jae-ik	MBC
2016	Yeah, That's How It Is	Yoo Jae-ho	SBS
2018-19	It's My Life	Han Man-seok	KBS2
2023	The Real Has Come!	Gong Chan-sik	KBS2

=== Film ===
Year	Title	Role
1989	Sand Castle	

== Awards and nominations ==
Year	Award	Category	Nominated work	Result
1991	KBS Drama Awards	Excellence Award, Actor	Yesterday's Green Grass	Won
2009	KBS Drama Awards	Top Excellence Award, Actor	Jolly Widows	Nominated
