= Trio (TV series) =

South Korean drama

- Hangul: 삼총사
- Hanja: 三銃士
- RR: Samchongsa
- MR: Samch'ongsa
- Genre: Drama
- Screenplay by: Jung Young-sun (정영선)
- Directed by: Jang Doo-ik (장두익)
- Starring: Ryu Jin; Son Ji-chang; Lee Jung-jin; Kim So-yeon; Hwang In-young; Jung Da-bin
- Country of origin: South Korea
- Original language: Korean
- No. of episodes: 17

Production
- Production company: BCWW (now Group 8)

Original release
- Network: MBC
- Release: November 6, 2002 – January 2, 2003

Trio (Korean: 삼총사; RR: Samchongsa) is a South Korean television drama produced by the MBC in 2002. The drama ran for a total of 17 episodes and opened with an 11.8% viewership score.

== Synopsis ==
Park, Jang and Roh were bosom friends as youths, along with Sa-yeong and Miri. Park and Jang later became entrepreneurs when they grew up.

One day, in Kuala Lumpur, Malaysia, Park and his company encountered gangsters who attempted assassination upon him. The company, one driving in a Perak-registered turquoise Volvo and the other in a Kuala-Lumpur registered bluish-purple Proton Wira was chased by one gangster on a motorbike and his company.

As they drove through a road surrounded by woods, the company stopped their car and took out their revolvers to shoot the gangsters, and hit the one riding on a motorbike, who fell off as he was riding on it. Meanwhile, the gangster's Malay accomplices attempted to restart the car.

Da-yeong faced several reporters who interviewed him about the ordeal. As he was about to enter the (black) car, an assassin hiding in the bushes fired his sniper, and the bullet hit right on Da-yeong's head. Jun-ki, whose face was splashed with his father's blood, shouted out and carried his mortally wounded father who was staggering.

== Cast ==
- Ryu Jin as Park Jun-ki
  - Baek Sung-hyun as young Jun-ki
- Son Ji-chang as Jang Bum-soo
- Lee Jung-jin as Roh Ji-mun
- Kim So-yeon as Choi Seo-young
- Hwang In-young as Jeong Miri
- Jeong Wook as Lee Da-yeong
- Jang Yong as Ahn Dong-kwon
- Jeong Da-bin as Jang Yoon-jung (Bum-soo's sister)
- Yu Ji-in as Park Jung-hae (Jun-ki's mother)
- Kim Young-ok as Bum-soo's grandmother
- Kim Chang-sook as Soo-young's mother
- Lee Jung-hoon as Kim Hyung-joo
- Suh Hyun-suk as Oh Hyun-tae
- Kim So-won
