= The Blue (musical duo) =

South Korean musical duo

- Origin: South Korea
- Genres: R&B
- Years active: 1990s, 2009
- Labels: SM Entertainment
- Members: Son Ji-chang; Kim Min-jong

The Blue is a South Korean musical duo that was formed in 1992, consisting of Son Ji-chang and Kim Min-jong. Both members were prominent actors at that time, playing leading roles in hit dramas, which contributed to their widespread popularity among women when they debuted with ballads and dance music. They went their separate ways for a while after their first album, but reunited in 1995 for a second project and produced many chart-toppers.

== Discography ==
=== Album ===
- 1st The Blue – New Release (1992)
- The Blue (1995)

=== EP ===
- The Blue – The First Memories (2009)
