= Jolly Widows =

South Korean romance musical drama

- Also known as: All of Us, Cha-cha-cha
- Genre: Drama, Romance, Family
- Directed by: Kim Sung-geun; Kim Young-kyun
- Starring: Shim Hye-jin; Lee Jong-soo; Park Hae-mi; Lee Chung-ah; Park Han-byul; Jo An
- Country of origin: South Korea
- Original language: Korean
- No. of episodes: 156

Production
- Running time: 30 minutes

Original release
- Network: KBS1
- Release: 29 June 2009 – 30 January 2010

Jolly Widows (Korean: 다함께 차차차; RR: Dahamkke chachacha; lit. 'Everybody Cha-cha-cha') is a South Korean romance musical drama starring Shim Hye-jin, Lee Jong-soo, Park Hae-mi, Lee Chung-ah, Park Han-byul and Jo An. It aired on KBS1 from June 29, 2009, to January 30, 2010, on Mondays to Saturdays at 20:25 for 156 episodes.

== Plot ==
Two women became widows on the same day, same hour.

Ha Yoon-jung becomes the matriarch of her husband's family, supporting them because she feels guilty about her husband's disappearance. Oh Dong-ja, Yoon-jung's sister-in-law, has been living with Yoon-jung's help as well. After the terrifying day when they lost their husbands, the two women have been living as each other's friend and companion.

However, they become implacable enemies because of their children, since their daughters are rivals in love. And then Yoon-jung's husband, whom everyone assumed was dead, suddenly appears before them as the future father-in-law of Dong-ja's son.

== Cast ==
The Widows' family

- Shim Hye-jin as Ha Yoon-jung (Soo-hyun's mother)
- Park Hae-mi as Oh Dong-ja (Jin-woo & Jin-kyung's mother)
- Kim Young-ok as Park Jung-nyeo (mother-in-law/grandmother)
- Lee Chung-ah as Han Soo-hyun
  - Kim Ji-won as young Soo-hyun
- Oh Man-seok as Han Jin-woo
- Park Han-byul as Han Jin-kyung

Lee family

- Lee Jong-soo as Lee Chul
- Lee Joong-moon as Lee Han (older brother)
- Choi Joo-bong as Lee Jang (father)
- Kim Bo-mi as Lee Jung-sook (aunt, Lee Jang's sister)

Kang family

- Jo An as Kang Na-yoon
- Lee Eung-kyung as Na Eun-hye (mother)
- Hong Yo-seob as Kang Shin-wook (stepfather, Eun-hye's husband)
- Seo Ji-hee as Kang Na-jung (Eun-hye & Shin-ok's daughter)

Extended cast

- Lee Jong-won as Lee Joon-woo
- Kim Seok-ok as Joon-woo's mother
- Kim Byung-man as Moon Goon (Yoon-jung's auto mechanic)
- Han Seol-ah as Mi-kyung (Han Jin-kyung's friend)
- Jung Sung-woon as Min Kyung-hyun (animation producer)
- Lee Da-in as Cha Seung-min
- Kim Do-yeon

== Awards and nominations ==
Year	Award	Category	Recipient	Result
2009	KBS Drama Awards	Top Excellence Award, Actor	Hong Yo-seob	Nominated
2009	KBS Drama Awards	Excellence Award, Actor in a Daily Drama	Oh Man-seok	Won
2009	KBS Drama Awards	Excellence Award, Actor in a Daily Drama	Lee Jong-won	Nominated
2009	KBS Drama Awards	Excellence Award, Actress in a Daily Drama	Jo An	Won
2009	KBS Drama Awards	Excellence Award, Actress in a Daily Drama	Shim Hye-jin	Nominated
2009	KBS Drama Awards	Excellence Award, Actress in a Daily Drama	Lee Eung-kyung	Nominated
2009	KBS Drama Awards	Best Supporting Actress	Park Hae-mi	Nominated
2009	KBS Drama Awards	Best New Actress	Lee Chung-ah	Nominated
2009	KBS Drama Awards	Best New Actress	Park Han-byul	Nominated
2009	KBS Drama Awards	Popularity Award, Actress	Jo An	Nominated
2009	KBS Drama Awards	Best Couple Award	Oh Man-seok and Jo An	Nominated
