= Choi Myung-gil =

South Korean actress (born 1962)

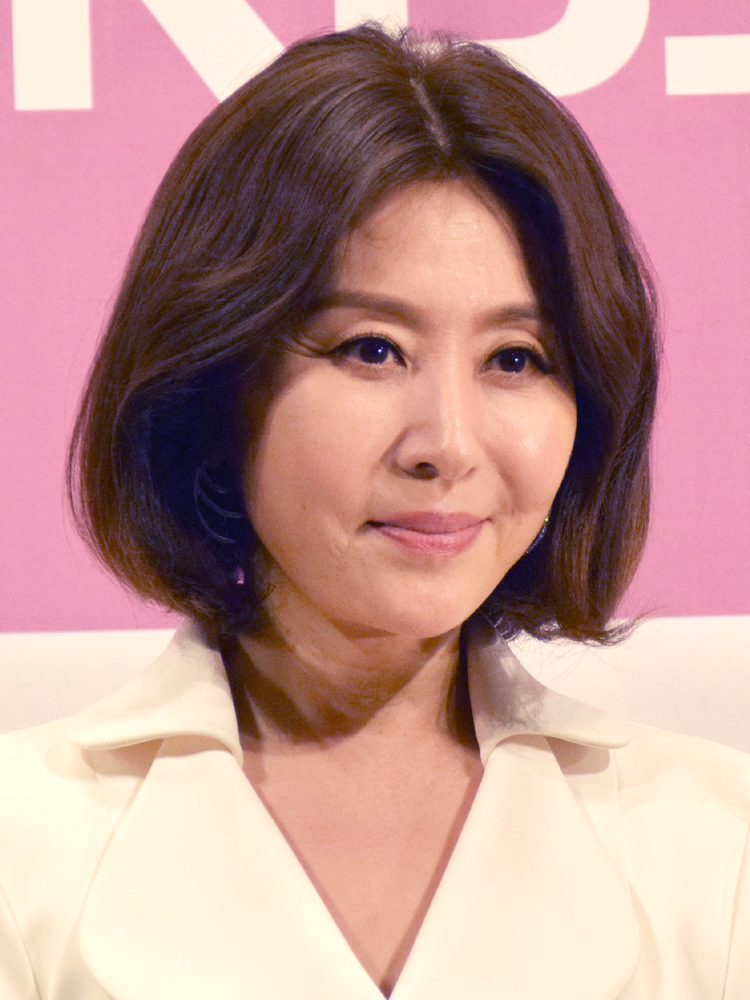
- Choi in 2019
- Born: November 11, 1962 (age 63); Seoul, South Korea
- Education: Seoul Art College - Broadcasting and Entertainment
- Occupation: Actress
- Years active: 1981–present
- Spouse: Kim Han-gil
- Children: 2

Korean name
- Hangul: 최명길
- Hanja: 崔明吉
- RR: Choe Myeonggil
- MR: Ch'oe Myŏnggil

Choi Myung-gil (Korean: 최명길; born November 11, 1962) is a South Korean actress. Choi received several Best Actress awards for her portrayal of a proprietress who rents out her comic book shop as an overnight shelter in the 1994 film Rosy Life (also known as La Vie en Rose). She has also starred in numerous television dramas, notably Marriage (1993), Tears of the Dragon (1996), Empress Myeongseong (2001), and Again, My Love (2009).

== Biography ==
Choi is married to politician and lawmaker Kim Han-gil; Kim is chairman of the Democratic Party and co-chairman of the New Politics Alliance for Democracy. The couple have two sons.

== Career ==
In 2023, Choi starred in TV Chosun's fantasy melodrama series Durian's Affair.

== Filmography ==
=== Film ===
Year	Title	Role	Notes	Ref.
1983	A Story About Lovers			
1986	Milky Way in Blue Sky			
1986	With Her Eyes and Body	Yang Jin-hee		
1986	Night Fairy			
1987	Pillar of Mist	"I"		
1989	Honeymoon			
1990	The Lovers of Woomook-baemi	Min Gong-rye		
1994	Rosy Life	Madam		
2011	Sunny	Past photo	Cameo	
2026	Nowhere to Lay My Eyes			

=== Television series ===
Year	Title	Role	Notes	Ref.
1981	Angry Eyes			
1982	Friend, Friend			
1982	Linger			
1983	500 Years of Joseon: "The King of Chudong Palace"	Daughter of Goryeo royalty		
1983	Sunflower in Winter			
1984	MBC Bestseller Theater: "Looking for a Woman"	Mi-yeon		
1984	500 Years of Joseon: "The Ume Tree in the Midst of the Snow"	Queen Jeonghyeon		
1985	The Season of Men	Park Mi-ran		
1985	500 Years of Joseon: The Wind Orchid"	Queen Jeonghyeon		
1986	Drama Game			
1987	The Face of a City	Lee Jung-hwa		
1988	Three Women	Lee Min-ja		
1988	500 Years of Joseon: "Memoirs of Lady Hyegyeong"	Lady Hyegyeong		
1990	That Woman	Han Jae-sook		
1991	Another's Happiness	Cha Moon-young		
1991	Windmills of Love			
1992	The Chemistry Is Right	Seo Hyun-ja		
1992	Reunion	Ji-hye		
1993	Marriage	Na Ji-young		
1993	Theme Series "Father"			
1993	Friday's Woman: "Woman on the Edge of the Cliff"			
1994	There is No Love	Han So-jin		
1996	TV Literature: "Lost in the Supermarket"	Kim Sun-young		
1996	Tears of the Dragon	Queen Wongyeong		
2000	Foolish Princes	Kim Young-sook		
2000	Gibbs' Family			
2001	Empress Myeongseong	Empress Myeongseong	episodes 82–124	
2003	South of the Sun	Jung Yeon-hee		
2005	Woman Above Flowers	Kim Jung-ah		
2007	By My Side	Jang Seon-hee		
2008	The Great King, Sejong	Queen Wongyeong		
2009	Again, My Love	Han Myung-in		
2009	Invincible Lee Pyung Kang	Je Hwang-hu ("Queen Je-mun")		
2010	The King of Legend	Haebi Haesosul, King Biryu's first queen consort		
2010	Stormy Lovers	Seo Yoon-hee		
2011	Miss Ripley	Lee Hwa		
2011	Glory Jane	Park Gun-ja		
2013	Pots of Gold	Yoon Shim-deok		
2013	Marry Him If You Dare	Na Mi-rae's future self		
2014	Punch	Yoon Ji-sook		
2015	House of Bluebird	Han Sun-hee		
2015	Sweet Home, Sweet Honey	Bae Gook-hee		
2016	You Are a Gift	Eun Young-ae		
2016	Entourage	Kang Ok-ja		
2018	Mysterious Personal Shopper	Geum Young-sook		
2019	Mother of Mine	Jeon In-sook		
2019–2020	Gracious Revenge	Cha Mi-yeon / Carrie Jung Mi-ae		
2020	Men Are Men	Kim Seon-hee		
2021	Red Shoes	Min Hee-kyung		
2023	Durian's Affair	Baek Do-i		

== Awards and nominations ==
Year	Award ceremony	Category	Nominated work	Result	Ref.
1985	21st Baeksang Arts Awards	Best New Actress (TV)	Looking for a Woman	Won	
1985	MBC Drama Awards	Excellence Award, Actress	The Ume Tree in the Midst of the Snow	Won	
1986	25th Grand Bell Awards	Best Actress	Pillar of Mist	Won	
1990	MBC Drama Awards	Top Excellence Award, Actress	That Woman	Won	
1990	28th Grand Bell Awards	Best Actress	The Lovers of Woomook-baemi	Nominated	
1990	11th Blue Dragon Film Awards	Best Actress	The Lovers of Woomook-baemi	Nominated	
1994	16th Three Continents Festival	Best Actress	Rosy Life	Won	
1994	15th Blue Dragon Film Awards	Best Actress	Rosy Life	Won	
1994	5th Chunsa Film Art Awards	Special Jury Prize	Rosy Life	Won	
1994	SBS Drama Awards	Grand Prize (Daesang)	Marriage	Won	
1995	Korea Broadcasting Awards	Excellence Award, Actress	Marriage	Won	
1995	31st Baeksang Arts Awards	Best Actress	Rosy Life	Won	
1995	15th Korean Association of Film Critics Awards	Best Actress	Rosy Life	Won	
1995	33rd Grand Bell Awards	Best Actress	Rosy Life	Nominated	
1997	10th Grimae Awards	Best Actress	Tears of the Dragon	Won	
1997	KBS Drama Awards	Top Excellence Award, Actress	Tears of the Dragon	Won	
2002	KBS Drama Awards	Top Excellence Award, Actress	Empress Myeongseong	Won	
2003	SBS Drama Awards	Top Excellence Award, Actress	South of the Sun	Nominated	
2003	SBS Drama Awards	Excellence Award, Actress in a Serial Drama	South of the Sun	Won	
2003	SBS Drama Awards	Top 10 Stars	South of the Sun	Won	
2007	MBC Drama Awards	Golden Acting Award, Actress in a Serial Drama	By My Side	Won	
2008	KBS Drama Awards	Top Excellence Award, Actress	The Great King, Sejong	Nominated	
2009	KBS Drama Awards	Top Excellence Award, Actress	Again, My Love, Invincible Lee Pyung Kang	Nominated	
2009	KBS Drama Awards	Excellence Award, Actress in a Mid-length Drama	Again, My Love	Nominated	
2013	MBC Drama Awards	Golden Acting Award, Actress	Pots of Gold	Nominated	
2015	SBS Drama Awards	Top Excellence Award, Actress in a Drama Special	Punch	Won	
2021	KBS Drama Awards	Top Excellence Award, Actress	Red Shoes	Nominated	
2021	KBS Drama Awards	Excellence Award, Actress in a Daily Drama	Red Shoes	Nominated	
2022	8th APAN Star Awards	Top Excellence Award, Actress in a Serial Drama	Red Shoes	Nominated	
