= Invincible Lee Pyung Kang =

2009 South Korean television drama series

- Promotional poster
- Also known as: Taming of the Heir
- Hangul: 천하무적 이평강
- Hanja: 天下無敵李平岡
- RR: Cheonhamujeok I Pyeonggang
- MR: Ch'ŏnhamujŏk I P'yŏnggang
- Genre: Romantic comedy
- Written by: Park Kye-ok
- Directed by: Lee Jung-seob
- Starring: Nam Sang-mi; Ji Hyun-woo; Seo Do-young; Cha Ye-ryun
- Country of origin: South Korea
- Original language: Korean
- No. of episodes: 16

Production
- Running time: Mondays and Tuesdays at 21:55 (KST)
- Production companies: Shinyoung E&C Group

Original release
- Network: Korean Broadcasting System
- Release: 9 November – 29 December 2009

Invincible Lee Pyung Kang (Korean: 천하무적 이평강), also known as Taming of the Heir, is a 2009 South Korean television series starring Nam Sang-mi and Ji Hyun-woo. In a modern retelling of the classic Korean folktale "Princess Pyeonggang and the Fool Ondal" in which a princess helps her timid husband transform into an outstanding general during the Three Kingdoms era, Lee Pyung-kang is a golf course planner who "tames" Woo On-dal, the prodigal son of a rich man. It aired on KBS2 from 9 November to 29 December 2009 on Mondays and Tuesdays at 21:55 for 16 episodes.

== Synopsis ==
Lee Pyung-kang moved to Gangwon Province, far away from Seoul as a teen due to her father's occupation. Thanks to him, a renowned golf course designer, Pyung-kang was able to fully understand every detail of golf course planning while growing up. Her father, however, met with an untimely death before completing his ambitious work. Frustrated, Pyung-kang tried to support the family, but the harsh reality did not allow her and the rest of the family to live a comfortable life.

Eight years later. Pyung-kang who wanted to follow in her father's footsteps to become a golf course designer, has to come to terms with the reality. She is now the breadwinner of the family, living paycheck by paycheck. She does odd jobs at a resort town where she meets Woo On-dal, the owner's eldest son.

On-dal's charismatic father Pyung-won demands that On-dal pass the semi-pro qualification test in a month. When he fails to make it, On-dal is told that he will be removed from his father's will due to his incompetence. Pyung-won then collapses from a sudden stroke and in the midst of misfortune rumor circulates that On-dal's stepmother and her son are going to take over the resort town. Being cornered, On-dal has no other choice but to stand on his own feet. But for On-dal who lacks competence and determination, retaking the resort is beyond his capacity.

Ever since they met, On-dal and Pyung-kang have been on bad terms with each other, but together they join forces to save the resort. As Pyung-kang whips On-dal into shape, thus taming the spoiled heir, they bicker their way to friendship and romance.

== Cast ==
=== Main characters ===
- Nam Sang-mi as Lee Pyung-kang ("Princess Pyung-kang")

She may have been the infamous crybaby "Princess Pyung-kang" in her previous life, but in this life, she is the headstrong and stubborn employee of a resort town. Pyung-kang wants to follow in her dead father's footsteps to become a golf course designer, and she proudly works hard at her lowly chores. Everything was going well for her until she meets Woo On-dal, the hateful prodigal son of the rich man who employed her to design the new golf resort. She and On-dal are always bickering whenever they meet. But she wonders sometimes if they'd already met a long time ago as she finds him strangely familiar... And why is she developing endearing feelings towards him? Shouldn't she be hating him for making her life miserable?

- Ji Hyun-woo as Woo On-dal ("General On-dal")

In his previous life, On-dal was once the most famous fool in Korean history, often bullied by people around him because of his good nature and extreme honesty. But he managed to turn his fate around in his present life as Woo On-dal, the son of a rich man. Being sharp-tongued and cold, he commands fear and respect from the people around him. So how dare that lowly employee, Lee Pyung-kang go against him and cause him to get into embarrassing situations all the time? But why is he feeling the sting of jealousy whenever he sees Edward getting close to her?

- Seo Do-young as Edward

Born to an American father and a Korean mother, he is a professional golfer who's won the PGA Championship several times since he was young. As Pyung-kang's "daddy-long-legs" suitor, he gets on On-dal's nerves, which makes him realize that he's fallen for the stubborn girl.

- Cha Ye-ryun as Kwan Ja-rak ("Princess Ja-rak")

In her past life, she was a rival princess who lost in her battle of love against Princess Pyung-kang, who entered On-dal's life first. But in this present life, she is a model and Woo On-dal's girlfriend, the only person he loves wholeheartedly despite his cold exterior. But she notices that On-dal is beginning to change since he met Pyung-kang. Although he is becoming more like a human being instead of the ice prince that he has always been, she feels that they are drifting further apart.

- Choi Myung-gil as Je Hwang-hu ("Queen Je-mun")

She was the evil queen that separated Princess Pyung-kang and On-dal in 1400 BC, and she has followed their reincarnations into their present lives as well. As Woo On-dal's stepmother and a real estate tycoon, she creates trouble and misunderstandings between Pyung-kang and On-dal when they get in the way of her ambitious plans. Will she be able to keep the destined couple separated or be outwitted by them this time?

- Park Ki-woong as Jo Sun-in

He lost his parents and childhood memories due to a Gangwon landslide accident when he was young. It caused him to develop autism, and he can only express his feelings through rap music which is like medicine that heals his inner wounds. He is in love with Jo Bi-yun, a divorcee.

- Yeon Mi-joo as Jo Bi-yun ("Princess Pyung-kang's lady-in-waiting")

In her previous life, she was Princess Pyung-kang's palace maid who was willing to risk her life to protect the princess from danger and harm. And in her present life, she is a loyal friend and "eonni" to the stubborn Pyung-kang, protecting her like always. She knows that Jo Sun-in likes her, but she keeps rejecting him because of their age difference and her divorced background.

- Kim Heung-soo as Je Young-ryu

The son of real estate tycoon Je Hwang-hu, and the stepbrother of Woo On-dal. Though he possesses the skills and resourcefulness in dealing with others, he was forced to give up on his dreams and love due to his mother's ambitions.

- Kil Yong-woo as Woo Pyung-won ("King Pyung-won")

In his past life, he was a king who threatened his crying daughter that he was going to marry her off to the fool On-dal if she didn't stop, but ended up regretting it when Princess Pyung-kang later insisted that he keep his word. Though she married On-dal, Pyung-won kept rejecting him until her "training" made him a worthy son-in-law in his eyes. In the present life, he is On-dal's father who is constantly worried and angry over the actions of his wayward son. So it's time for Pyung-kang, to whom he has taken a fatherly liking, to "train" On-dal once again and stop his ambitious new wife and stepson from taking over his golf "kingdom."

=== Supporting characters ===
- Lee Deok-hee as Yun Na-bu
- Jo Deok-hyun as So Doo-shik
- Ahn Hye-kyung as Wang Sung-hee
- Shin Ha-yeon as Go Min-hee
- Choi Yoon-young as Bong So-hee
- Kang Soo-han as Lee Sung-woo
- Kim Hwan-hee as Lee Pyung-ohn
- Oh Wook-chul as Ma Hyun-tae
- Kang Dong-yup as Lawyer Han
- Kim Ji-won as Kim So-hee
- Jung Eun-pyo as Lee Jang
- Lee Cheol-min as Chun-bong
- Choi Seung-kyung as village leader
- Lee Jin-sung as Taebaek policeman (ep 4)
- Yoo Oh-sung as policeman (cameo)
- Song Mi-jin
- Shin Na-ri
- Hwang Gun

== Ratings ==
Date	Episode	Nationwide	Seoul
2009-11-09	1	6.7%	9.2%
2009-11-10	2	5.2%	8.0%
2009-11-16	3	6.2%	9.2%
2009-11-17	4	6.2%	8.0%
2009-11-23	5	6.1%	8.5%
2009-11-24	6	6.8%	8.2%
2009-11-30	7	7.0%	8.4%
2009-12-01	8	5.7%	8.6%
2009-12-07	9	4.8%	8.1%
2009-12-08	10	5.5%	7.9%
2009-12-14	11	5.5%	8.4%
2009-12-15	12	6.2%	7.9%
2009-12-21	13	6.1%	8.5%
2009-12-22	14	5.0%	7.9%
2009-12-28	15	7.0%	9.2%
2009-12-29	16	8.0%	9.3%
Average		6.1%	-

Source: TNS Media Korea

== Awards and nominations ==
Year	Award	Category	Recipient	Result
2009	KBS Drama Awards	Top Excellence Award, Actress	Choi Myung-gil	Nominated
2009	KBS Drama Awards	Excellence Award, Actor in a Miniseries	Ji Hyun-woo	Nominated
2009	KBS Drama Awards	Excellence Award, Actress in a Miniseries	Nam Sang-mi	Nominated
2009	KBS Drama Awards	Best New Actor	Park Ki-woong	Nominated
2009	KBS Drama Awards	Best Young Actress	Kim Hwan-hee	Nominated
2009	KBS Drama Awards	Best Couple Award	Ji Hyun-woo and Nam Sang-mi	Nominated
2009	KBS Drama Awards	Best Couple Award	Kil Yong-woo and Choi Myung-gil	Nominated
