= The Accidental Couple =

South Korean television series

- Promotional poster
- Hangul: 그저 바라 보다가
- RR: Geujeo bara bodaga
- MR: Kŭjŏ para podaga
- Genre: Romantic comedy
- Written by: Jung Jin-young; Kim Eui-chan
- Directed by: Ki Min-soo
- Starring: Hwang Jung-min; Kim Ah-joong
- Country of origin: South Korea
- Original language: Korean
- No. of episodes: 16

Production
- Running time: 60 minutes Wednesdays and Thursdays at 21:55 (KST)
- Production company: RaemongRaein

Original release
- Network: KBS2
- Release: April 29 – June 18, 2009

The Accidental Couple (Korean: 그저 바라 보다가; RR: Geujeo bara bodaga; lit. 'Just Looking'), shortened to That Fool (그바보; Geubabo), is a 2009 South Korean television series starring Hwang Jung-min and Kim Ah-joong. The romantic comedy series focuses on the relationship between a post office clerk and an actress after they agree to a six-month contract marriage. It aired on KBS2 from April 29 to June 18, 2009, on Wednesdays and Thursdays at 21:55 (KST) for 16 episodes.

The drama was acclaimed film and stage actor Hwang Jung-min's first TV drama in a career spanning over fourteen years.

== Synopsis ==
Top actress Han Ji-soo (Kim Ah-joong) is in a car accident. The problem is that her secret boyfriend, who is the son of a famous politician, was driving the car. To cover up their relationship, Ji-soo lets her boyfriend escape the scene quickly and drags an innocent onlooker, Gu Dong-baek (Hwang Jung-min), into the car instead, asking him to pretend to have driven the car. The paparazzi arrive and take their photos. After this incident, Dong-baek, a post office employee, quickly draws public attention as the actress's new boyfriend. But one of the paparazzi photographers suspects that somebody else was driving the car when the accident occurred, and the man veiled in secrecy is her real boyfriend. To drive the persistent paparazzi away, Ji-soo asks Dong-baek to continue acting as her boyfriend. Dong-baek, an avid fan of Ji-soo, readily accepts her proposal and they agree to a six-month contract marriage. Before the contract period ends, however, the actress finds herself deeply attached to this humble man's pure love.

== Cast ==
- Hwang Jung-min as Gu Dong-baek
- Kim Ah-joong as Han Ji-soo
  - Im Si-eun as young Ji-soo
- Joo Sang-wook as Kim Kang-mo (Ji-soo's secret boyfriend)
- Lee Chung-ah as Gu Min-ji (Dong-baek's younger sister)
  - Lee Jua as young Min-ji
- Baek Sung-hyun as Han Sang-chul (Ji-soo's younger brother)
  - Cha Jun-hwan as young Sang-chul
- Jeon Mi-seon as Cha Yun-kyung (Ji-soo's manager & best friend)
- Lee Soo-young as Jo Seung-eun (Min-ji's best friend)
- Yeon Mi-joo as Park Kyung-ae
- Hong Ji-young as Jo Myung-jin
- Moon Jae-won as Yoon-seob
- Kang Hee-soo as Tae-won
- Kim Hyung-gyu as Kim Suk-hyun
- Kim Kwang-kyu as Team leader Go at the post office
- Yoon Joo-sang as Director Yoon
- Jung Dong-hwan as Kim Jung-wook (Kang-mo's father, a politician)
- Ryu Tae-ho as Assistant Kim (Jung-wook's secretary)
- Lee Hae-young as Reporter Baek
- Park Ha-sun as Choi Soo-yeon (Kang-mo's fiancée)
- Jo Sang-gun as President Choi (Soo-yeon's father)
- Hong Seok-cheon as movie director (cameo)
- Choi Yoon-young as stylist

== Ratings ==
In the tables below, the blue numbers represent the lowest ratings and the red numbers represent the highest ratings.

Ep.	Original broadcast date	Average audience share	
Ep.	Original broadcast date	TNmS Ratings	
Ep.	Original broadcast date	Nationwide	Seoul
1	April 29, 2009	8.6% (17th)	8.5% (16th)
2	April 30, 2009	9.1% (14th)	8.7% (14th)
3	May 6, 2009	10.5% (11th)	10.5% (14th)
4	May 7, 2009	10.6% (12th)	10.8% (12th)
5	May 13, 2009	10.3% (11th)	10.4% (11th)
6	May 14, 2009	9.7% (12th)	9.5% (12th)
7	May 20, 2009	11.2% (8th)	11.3% (9th)
8	May 21, 2009	10.7% (11th)	10.9% (11th)
9	May 27, 2009	10.9% (8th)	11.3% (7th)
10	May 28, 2009	11.0% (9th)	11.6% (8th)
11	June 3, 2009	12.8% (7th)	13.9% (6th)
12	June 4, 2009	13.1% (7th)	13.8% (7th)
13	June 10, 2009	12.8% (6th)	13.3% (6th)
14	June 11, 2009	10.0% (9th)	10.1% (9th)
15	June 17, 2009	15.0% (6th)	15.6% (5th)
16	June 18, 2009	14.4% (6th)	14.9% (6th)
Average		11.3%	11.6%

== Awards and nominations ==
Year	Award	Category	Recipient	Result
2009	KBS Drama Awards	Top Excellence Award, Actor	Hwang Jung-min	Nominated
2009	KBS Drama Awards	Excellence Award, Actor in a Miniseries	Hwang Jung-min	Nominated
2009	KBS Drama Awards	Excellence Award, Actress in a Miniseries	Kim Ah-joong	Won
2009	KBS Drama Awards	Best Supporting Actor	Yoon Joo-sang	Won
2009	KBS Drama Awards	Best Supporting Actress	Jeon Mi-seon	Nominated
2009	KBS Drama Awards	Best New Actress	Lee Chung-ah	Nominated
2009	KBS Drama Awards	Popularity Award, Actor	Hwang Jung-min	Nominated
2009	KBS Drama Awards	Popularity Award, Actress	Kim Ah-joong	Nominated
2009	KBS Drama Awards	Best Couple Award	Hwang Jung-min and Kim Ah-joong	Nominated

== International broadcast ==
It aired in Thailand on Channel 7 every Thursday to Friday at 8.30 a.m. starting from February 14, 2013.

It aired in the Philippines on TV5 every Monday to Friday at 9.00 p.m. starting from January 25, 2016.
