= Park Ki-woong =

South Korean actor

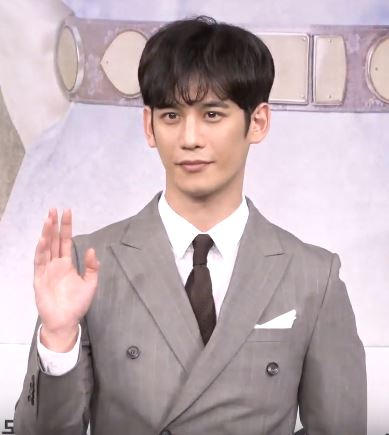
- Park in July 2019
- Born: February 13, 1985 (age 41); Andong, North Gyeongsang Province, South Korea
- Other name: Park Gi-woong
- Education: Daejin University - Visual Communication Design; Kyongbuk University of Foreign Studies - Chinese
- Occupations: Actor; painter
- Years active: 2004–present
- Agent: SidusHQ

Korean name
- Hangul: 박기웅
- Hanja: 朴基雄
- RR: Bak Giung
- MR: Pak Kiung

Park Ki-woong (born February 13, 1985) is a South Korean actor. He is best known for the TV series The Slingshot (2009) and Bridal Mask (2012), Return (2018) and Rookie Historian Goo Hae-ryung (2019) as well as the films My Tutor Friend 2 (2007) and Secretly, Greatly (2013).

== Career ==
Park Ki-woong made his entertainment debut in the 2004 K2 music video "Giving You Love," then launched his acting career in 2005. He rose to stardom for being the "mill dance (맷돌춤)" guy in a 2006 SKY PMP Phone commercial. After a series of supporting roles on TV and film, Park starred in his first leading role in the 2007 romantic comedy My Tutor Friend 2, but the film wasn't commercially successful. In 2008, he became the honorary ambassador of his hometown Andong.

The Slingshot (2009) gave Park his first acting accolades. Critics and viewers praised his portrayal of an autistic genius who transforms into the best stock market analyst in the country. His other notable roles include an invading Manchurian prince in period action film War of the Arrows (2011); a sociopathic Japanese officer in colonized Korea in Bridal Mask (2012); and an elite North Korean spy undercover as a rock musician in box office hit Secretly, Greatly (2013).

In July 2013, Park released the EP You Are My Baby as a special gift to his fans. He also wrote the lyrics of the title song "You Are My Baby" which featured Younha. Park then joined the newly launched reality/variety show Beating Hearts (also known as Heart Is Beating) in September 2013, which follows six celebrities as they undergo the process of becoming firefighters and EMTs.

Park next appeared in the Kim Ki-duk-produced film Made in China. But before its release, he enlisted for his mandatory military service on May 8, 2014. After undergoing basic training, Park was assigned as a policeman for 21 months.

Following his discharge, Park made a comeback in MBC's revenge melodrama Monster. He was next cast in the big-screen adaptation of popular webcomic Cheese in the Trap, playing the role of a musical genius.

In 2018, Park starred in mystery thriller Return.

In 2019, Park joined Jellyfish Entertainment, home of artists such as gugudan. The same year, he was also cast in the historical drama Rookie Historian Goo Hae-ryung.

In March 2021, Park signed with the Mountain Movement, making his debut as a painter. later in April Park joins the original wave drama You Raise Me Up with Yoon Shi-yoon and Ahn Hee-yeon.

In April 2023, Park signed with SidusHQ.

== Filmography ==
=== Film ===
Year	Title	Role	Notes	Ref.
2005	Kaidan	Lee Dong-ho		
2006	Art of Fighting	Jae-hoon		
2007	My Tutor Friend 2	Jong-man		
2007	Someone Behind You	Hong Seok-min		
2011	War of the Arrows	Dorgon		
2012	Never Ending Story	Dong-joo's brother		
2013	Secretly, Greatly	Rhee Hae-rang		
2014	Mad Sad Bad	Yeo-wool	segment: "I Saw You"	
2015	Made in China	Chen		
2018	Cheese in the Trap	Baek In-ho		

=== Television series ===
Year	Title	Role	Notes	Ref.
2005	Chosun Police	Choi Jong-gil		
2007	Encore TV Literature: "Castella"	Kim Seung-il		
2008	Drama City: "Love Hunt Thirty Minus Three"	Jo Hwi-min		
2008	Night After Night	Heo Gyun		
2008	Seoul Warrior Story	Kim Dong-hae		
2008	Love Marriage	In Kyung-hwan		
2009	The Slingshot	Ahn Kyeong-tae		
2009	Invincible Lee Pyung Kang	Jo Sun-in		
2010	The Slave Hunters	That person		
2010	KBS Drama Special: "The Scary One, The Ghost and I"	Kang Doo-sub		
2010	Golden Fish	Han Kang-min		
2011	The Musical	Yoo Jin		
2011	Me Too, Flower!	Cha Bong-sun's ex-boyfriend	Cameo	
2011	Pianissimo			
2012	Bridal Mask	Kimura Shunji		
2012	Full House Take 2	Won Kang-hwi		
2013	Good Doctor	Park Woong-ki	Cameo (Episode 20)	
2013	Drama Festival: "Swine Escape"	Lee Ho-yeon		
2016	Monster	Doh Geon-woo		
2018	Return	Kang In-ho		
2019	Rookie Historian Goo Hae-ryung	Crown Prince / King Yi Jin		
2020	Kkondae Intern	Namgoong Joon-soo		
2021	The King's Affection	Chief Eunuch and Envoy from the Ming Dynasty	Cameo (Episode 7)	
2023	Pandora: Beneath the Paradise	Jang Do-jin		
2026	Recipe for Love	Yang Hyun-bin		

=== Web series ===
Year	Title	Role	Ref.
2021	You Raise Me Up	Do Ji-hyuk	
2023	A Time Called You	Choi Myung-il (episode 4)	
2023	My Man Is Cupid	Seo Jae-hee	

=== Television shows ===
Year	Title	Role	Notes	Ref.
2013–2014	Beating Hearts	Cast member		

=== Web shows ===
Year	Title	Role	Notes	Ref.
2020	Tupac Talk Travel	Host	with Park Hae-jin	
2020–present	Park Ki-woong's Culture Live	Host		

=== Music video appearances ===
Year	Song Title	Artist	Ref.
2004	"Giving You Love"	K2	
2006	"City Life"	Defconn	
2008	"Because of a Man"	Joo	
2013	"The Reason We Broke Up"	Younha	
2021	"Tonight"	Brown Eyed Soul	

== Discography ==
=== EP ===
Year	Album Information	Track listing
2008	다시 시작해 (Let's Start Again): Released: August 8, 2008; Label: iMBC; Format: digital download	Track list: 1. 다시 시작해 (Let's Start Again); 2. 다시 시작해 (Let's Start Again) (Inst.)
2013	You Are My Baby: Released: July 24, 2013; Label: CJ E&M Music and Live; Format: CD, digital download	Track list: 1. "고백해요 (Confession)" (feat. Jungyup); 2. "You Are My Baby" (feat. Younha); 3. "눈을 감아도 (Close My Eyes)"

=== Soundtrack ===
Year	Song Title	From the Album
2012	"Touch" (duet with No Min-woo)	Full House Take 2 OST
2012	"Baby Why"	Full House Take 2 OST

== Awards and nominations ==
Name of the award ceremony, year presented, category, nominee of the award, and the result of the nomination
Award ceremony	Year	Category	Nominee / Work	Result	Ref.
Gwanak Contemporary Art Competition	2021	Face of Flame	Park Ki-woong	Won	
Hallyu Culture Awards Ceremony	2021	Special Achievement Award	Park Ki-woong	Won	
KBS Drama Awards	2009	Best New Actor	The Slingshot, Invincible Lee Pyung Kang	Nominated	
KBS Drama Awards	2012	Best Supporting Actor	Bridal Mask	Won	
KBS Drama Awards	2012	Best Couple Award	Park Ki-woong with Joo Won; Bridal Mask	Nominated	
MBC Drama Awards	2016	Excellence Award, Actor in a Special Project Drama	Monster	Nominated	
MBC Drama Awards	2019	Excellence Award, Actor in a Wednesday-Thursday Miniseries	Rookie Historian Goo Hae-ryung	Nominated	
MBC Drama Awards	2020	Excellence Award, Actor in a Wednesday-Thursday Miniseries	Kkondae Intern	Nominated	
Newsis Hallyu Expo Hallyu Culture Grand Prize	2021	K-Art Award	Park Ki-woong	Won	
SBS Drama Awards	2018	Excellence Award, Actor in a Wednesday-Thursday Drama	Return	Nominated	
SBS Drama Awards	2018	Best Character	Return	Won	
