= Lee Joon-gi filmography =

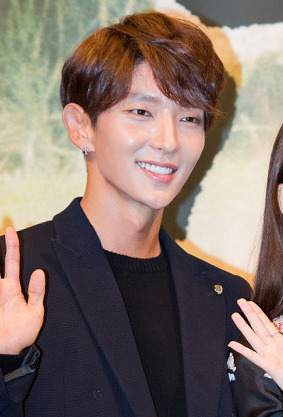
- Lee Joon-gi in 2016
- Film: 8
- Television series: 20
- Web series: 2
- Television show: 4
- Music videos: 1

Lee Joon-gi (Korean: 이준기; born April 17, 1982) is a South Korean actor who quickly rose to fame on his first leading role playing a clown in the critically acclaimed film The King and the Clown (2005) and gained further recognition in the romantic comedy My Girl (2005−06). Since then, he has diversified into other genres such as historical dramas (sageuk) and action thrillers. The popularity of his work overseas, especially in Asia, have established him as a top Hallyu star.

== Film ==
Year	Title	Role	Notes	Ref.
2004	The Hotel Venus	Boy	Japanese production	
2004	Flying Boys	Dong-wan		
2005	The King and the Clown	Gong-gil		
2006	Fly, Daddy, Fly	Go Seung-suk		
2007	Virgin Snow	Kim Min	Korean and Japanese co-production	
2007	May 18	Kang Jin-woo		
2016	Never Said Goodbye	Jun-ho	Chinese production	
2016	Resident Evil: The Final Chapter	Commander Chu	Hollywood debut	
TBA	Dochabi	Yi Do-gwan	Netflix film	

== Television series ==
Key
†	Denotes films that have not yet been released

Year	Title	Role	Notes	Ref.
2003	Nonstop 4	Himself	Cameo	
2004	Drama City – "What Should I Do?"	Seong-ho	Cameo (ep. 234)	
2004	Star's Echo	Chan-gyu		
2005	My Girl	Seo Jung-woo		
2006	The 101st Proposal	Himself	Cameo (ep. 1)	
2007	Time Between Dog and Wolf	Lee Soo-hyun / Kay		
2008	Iljimae	Yong / Lee Geom		
2009	Hero	Jin Do-hyuk		
2012	Arang and the Magistrate	Kim Eun-oh		
2013	Two Weeks	Jang Tae-san		
2014	Gunman in Joseon	Park Yoon-kang / Hasegawa Hanjo		
2015	The Scholar Who Walks the Night	Kim Sung-yeol		
2015	She Was Pretty	Himself	Cameo (ep. 9)	
2016	Moon Lovers: Scarlet Heart Ryeo	4th Prince Wang So		
2017	Criminal Minds	Kim Hyun-joon		
2018	Lawless Lawyer	Bong Sang-pil		
2019	Hotel del Luna	Exorcist	Cameo (ep. 3)	
2020	Flower of Evil	Baek Hee-sung / Do Hyun-soo		
2022	Again My Life	Kim Hee-woo		
2023	Arthdal Chronicles	Adult Eun-seom / Saya	Season 2	
2026	Kidnap Game	Han Ki-ju		

== Web series ==
Year	Title	Role	Notes	Ref.
2016	7 First Kisses	Himself	Episode 1–2	
2018	Secret Queen Makers	Himself	Episode 6	

== Television shows ==
Year	Title	Notes	Ref.
2009	World Special "LOVE" – Indonesia with Lee Joon-gi and Kim Ha-neul	March 21 and 28	
2012	Lee Joon-Gi's JG Style		
2013	Lee Joon-Gi's JG World		
2018	Lee Joon-Gi's JG Island		

== Music video appearances ==
Year	Song title	Artist	Ref.
2006	"Anystar"	Lee Hyo-ri	
