= My Jun, My Style =

Single by Lee Joon-gi
- Released: April 26, 2007
- Genre: Pop
- Label: Universal Music (TW)
- Producer(s): J&H Media

Lee Joon-gi singles chronology
"My Jun, My Style" (2007)	"J Style" (2009)

My Jun, My Style is the first single album by Lee Joon-gi. He released his mini album My Jun, My Style on April 26, 2007 which contains three ballads, which he wrote primarily for his fans at the Episode 1 fan meeting on May 21, 2006. In addition, this release comes with a DVD containing special footage of Lee's visits around Asia and behind-the-scenes footage. The photo album offers a first look at Lee's highly anticipated upcoming film Virgin Snow, which co-stars Japanese actress Aoi Miyazaki.

A poll by a music website Jukeon that asked "Who will be the most popular if they release an album?" Lee ended up being in first place with 66% of the votes.

== My Jun Collection ==
The My Jun Collection which was released August 16, 2006 comes with such essential gifts as a special Jun Ki standing base figure as well as special USB kit accessory. The set's 256 MB USB allows fans to access 3 special songs including the principal track's MV plus exclusive making of and photo material. Also included in this edition is the "My Jun" manual.

== Track listing ==
1. One Word (한마디만)
2. Don’t Know Love (사랑을 몰라)
3. Foolish Love (바보사랑)
