= List of GetBackers episodes =

First DVD volume cover, featuring Ban Mido and Ginji Amano, released by Bandai Visual on January 25, 2003

GetBackers is a Japanese anime television series based on the manga series GetBackers by Yuya Aoki and Rando Ayamine. The story follows the GetBackers, a retrieval duo composed of Ban Midou, a man born with the illusionary "Evil Eye" technique, and Ginji Amano, the former leader of the VOLTS gang that once ruled Shinjuku's dangerous Limitless Fortress. The series was produced by Studio Deen and directed by Kazuhiro Furuhashi and Keitaro Motonaga. It was broadcast for 49 episodes on TBS from October 5, 2002, to September 20, 2003. Bandai Visual collected its episodes on 17 DVDs released from January 25, 2003, to May 28, 2004.

The series features six music themes. The first opening song is "Yuragu Koto Nai Ai" (揺らぐことない愛; lit. 'Love That Never Wavers'), performed by Naomi Tamura, and the second opening song is "Barairo no Sekai" (薔薇色の世界; lit. '"Rose-Colored World"'), performed by Pierrot. The first ending song is "Ichibyō no Refrain" (一秒のリフレイン; lit. 'One Second Refrain'), performed by Otoha; the second ending song is "Namida no Hurricane" (涙のハリケーン, Namida no Harikēn; lit. 'Hurricane of Tears'), performed by Bon-Bon Blanco; the third ending song is "Mr. Déjà vu", performed by Naja; and the fourth ending song is "Changin", performed by Nona Reeves featuring You the Rock.

In North America, the series was licensed for English release by ADV Films. The episodes were collected on ten DVDs released from August 24, 2004, to November 1, 2005. In February 2012, Sentai Filmworks announced that it had re-licensed the series and released it on home video on May 8 of that same year.

== Episodes ==
=== Season 1 ===
| No. | Title | Original release date |
|---|---|---|
| 1 | "The Initials are G & B"; Transliteration: "Inisharu wa Jī ando Bī" (Japanese: イニシャルはG&B) | October 5, 2002 |
Natsumi Mizuki, a schoolgirl, loses a cherished kitty key chain from her mother after a police officer mistakes her for photographing him sharing information with yakuza members. Paul Wan, owner of the Honky Tonk cafe and an associate of the GetBackers, persuades Ban and Ginji to take the case. Despite initial setbacks, they recover the key chain, only to discover Natsumi has been kidnapped by the officer and his yakuza allies. The GetBackers intervene—Ginji generates lightning from his body, akin to an electric eel, while Ban employs his two hundred kilogram-force grip. Ban's Evil Eye traps the officer in an illusion where he murders Ban and Ginji before being gunned down by fellow officers. Once the illusion ends, Natsumi reclaims her key chain. She later begins working part-time at the Honky Tonk, the GetBackers' frequent gathering spot.
| 2 | "Get Back the Rusted Bonds!"; Transliteration: "Sabi ta Kizuna o Tori Kaese!" (Japanese: 錆びた絆を奪り還せ!) | October 12, 2002 |
Ban and Ginji, unemployed and starving, receive food and shelter from a homeless man named Yamamura. He reveals he was once a factory owner but lost everything after his daughter, Rika Yamamura, was kidnapped due to financial ruin and yakuza pressure. Yamamura hires the GetBackers to rescue her. After infiltrating the yakuza's mansion, Rika betrays them, claiming she willingly stays with the yakuza. However, the yakuza admit they intend to sell her and force her father's compliance. Ban uses his Evil Eye to trap Rika in an illusion where the yakuza leader kills Ban and Ginji, only for the gangsters to then burn alive. Upon waking, Ginji pleads with Rika to return to her father, but she refuses. Soon after, Yamamura suffers a fatal heart attack. In his final moments, Ban grants him a dying dream in which Rika comes back to him.
| 3 | "Operation: Recover the Platinum!"; Transliteration: "Purachina Dakkan Sakusen!" (Japanese: プラチナ奪還作戦!) | October 19, 2002 |
The negotiator Hevn presents the GetBackers with a job, leading them to meet Haruo Ohtaki, who tasks them with retrieving a stolen box from a group known as the Transporters. In exchange for taking the case, the GetBackers demand a share of the box's contents—later believed to be platinum. They attempt to intercept the Transporters, engaging in a high-speed chase. During the pursuit, Himiko Kudo sprays Ginji with a poisonous perfume that temporarily reduces his mind to that of an ape, causing Ban to lose control of their vehicle and crash off a cliff. While searching for the Transporters, Ban recounts to Ginji the origin of Himiko's nickname, Lady Poison. Meanwhile, the Transporters are ambushed by an interceptor and his gang, only for Kuroudo Akabane to slaughter them single-handedly. When the GetBackers finally catch up, both groups stop their vehicles and prepare for battle.
| 4 | "Recovery Service vs. Transport Service"; Transliteration: "Dakkanya bāsasu Hakobiya" (Japanese: 奪還屋VS運び屋) | October 26, 2002 |
As the GetBackers face the Transporters, Ginji prepares to confront Akabane while Ban focuses on retrieving the box. The situation turns dire when Akabane nearly eviscerates Ginji, forcing Ban to surrender. Ginji is taken captive inside the Transporters' semi-trailer truck, where he speaks with Himiko about Ban. She recalls her past alongside Ban and her older brother, Yamato, as part of a former recovery team. However, Himiko resents Ban, blaming him for Yamato's death—though Ginji insists he still trusts him. Ban later catches up to the Transporters, using his Evil Eye to free Ginji and secure the box. Realizing their disadvantage, the Transporters strategize their next move. Himiko informs Akabane that the Evil Eye can only affect a person three times in a single day, meaning Ban cannot use it against them again in the immediate confrontation.
| 5 | "Death Match at Sunrise: The Lightning Emperor vs. Doctor Jackal"; Transliteration: "Akatsuki no Shitou Raitei bāsasu Dokutā Jakkaru" (Japanese: 暁の死闘 雷帝 VS Dr. J) | November 2, 2002 |
The Transporters confront the GetBackers in an abandoned shrine. Ginji battles Akabane while Ban fights Himiko. Ban overpowers Himiko with his grip, nearly revealing the truth about Yamato's death before stopping himself. Meanwhile, Akabane demonstrates the full power of his glowing knives, but Ginji counters by magnetically manipulating them with electricity, defeating him. After the battle, the GetBackers depart to complete their mission. The next morning, Himiko seeks revenge, but Akabane declares he has had enough amusement for now and leaves alone. Himiko and the driver Maguruma locate the GetBackers, and Maguruma attempts to ram them with the semi-trailer truck. Ban uses his Evil Eye on a nearby crow, inducing a hallucination of a murder attacking the vehicle, causing Maguruma to crash into a pole. Upon delivering the box to Ohtaki, the GetBackers discover its contents are merely a watermelon labeled as "platinum". As payment, they receive one-tenth of the fruit.
| 6 | "Get Back the Divine Melody!"; Transliteration: "Kami no Shirabe o ToriKaese!" (Japanese: 神の旋律を奪り還せ!) | November 9, 2002 |
Madoka Otowa, a blind violin prodigy, and her guide dog Mozart face street thugs until Ginji intervenes. They meet Kazuki Fuchouin, Ginji's former subordinate from VOLTS. At Honky Tonk, the GetBackers accept a job to retrieve Madoka's stolen Stradivarius from renowned violinist Shunsuke Akutsu before her performance. Disguised as musicians, they infiltrate Akutsu's estate but are ambushed by Shido Fuyuki, another ex-VOLTS member now serving Akutsu. Madoka searches for her violin and encounters Shido, who lets her go. The trapped GetBackers face a caged lion—Ban uses Evil Eye to escape. Later, Ban, Paul, and Natsumi are surrounded by Shido's animal army. Ban uses Evil Eye again, reaching his limit, but challenges Shido to fight outside.
| 7 | "The Animal Transformation of the Beast Master"; Transliteration: "Jyuuhenge Biisuto Masutaa" (Japanese: 獣変化ビーストマスター) | November 16, 2002 |
As Ban prepares to crush Shido, Kazuki intervenes, allowing Ban to retreat. Ginji, Hevn, and Madoka face Ryuudou Hishiki while Ginji triggers a blackout. Ban reunites with Paul and Natsumi, while Ginji's group confronts Akutsu, who returns the Stradivarius—only to order Kazuma Kurobe to bury Madoka alive. Escaping the estate, they meet Sugahara, Madoka's guardian, who reveals himself as Tsujima Kurobe (Kazuma's brother) and abandons Ban and Ginji. Back at the estate, Shido battles Kurobe, transforming into a beast. Meanwhile, Sugahara attempts to kill Madoka but falls victim to Ban's Evil Eye trap. Ban defeats Sugahara as Ginji reengages Hishiki.
| 8 | "Timbre of Life, Resound!"; Transliteration: "Hibike, Inochi no Oto" (Japanese: 響け、生命の音色) | November 23, 2002 |
Ginji overpowers Hishiki with his electric abilities, then apologizes to Ban for Shido's rampage, regretting abandoning him. While searching for Shido with Hevn and Madoka, Ginji offers help but Shido insists on fighting alone. After defeating Kurobe, Shido secretly has Mozart return the Stradivarius to Akutsu's estate. Madoka chooses to perform with a regular violin that evening. Shido ultimately returns the Stradivarius, and Madoka repays him with a street performance that attracts her teacher Visconti, who teases her about liking Shido. During Akutsu's concert, Ban sabotages the performance using Evil Eye. The next day, Shido and Madoka bond in her backyard.
| 9 | "Get Back the Phantom Sunflowers!"; Transliteration: "Maboroshi no Himawari o Tori Kaese!" (Japanese: 幻のひまわりを奪り還せ!) | November 30, 2002 |
| 10 | "Get Back the Phantom Sunflowers!"; Transliteration: "Maboroshi no Himawari o Tori Kaese!" (Japanese: 幻のひまわりを奪り還せ!) | December 7, 2002 |
Hachisu, an art dealer, and Abukawa, a museum curator, hire the GetBackers to recover a mysterious thirteenth version of Van Gogh's Sunflowers. During their investigation, they trail Clayman, whose associate Himiko leads them through decoys wearing her likeness. Himiko poisons Ban with her mind-controlling perfume, forcing him to attack Ginji until lightning breaks the spell. Captured and restrained at Clayman's hideout, the duo easily escapes. Clayman then reveals the contested Sunflowers, challenging them to determine its authenticity. The GetBackers must now unravel the painting's secret while navigating their adversaries' schemes. At Clayman's gallery, the GetBackers marvel at displayed masterpieces. Clayman proposes becoming their new client, revealing she steals art to protect it from corrupt dealers. Suddenly, Hachisu and SWAT teams storm in—he admits using the GetBackers to locate Clayman and confirms the thirteenth Sunflowers was fake. Ban traps Hachisu in an Evil Eye vision of burning paintings. The next day, the GetBackers recover the fake Sunflowers during Hachisu's meeting, revealing Clayman (actually a woman) had disguised herself as Abukawa to return artworks. After helping restore the collection, they learn from Kazuki that Clayman's medium mother channeled deceased artists to create these posthumous masterpieces.
| 11 | "Breach the Limitless Fortress – Operation: Recover IL"; Transliteration: "Sennyuu, Mugenjyou · IL dakkan sakusen" (Japanese: 潜入、無限城·IL奪還作戦) | December 14, 2002 |
Hevn assembles a team (Ban, Ginji, Shido, Kazuki, Akabane, Himiko) for a mission near the Limitless Fortress. At an abandoned building, masked operatives task them with retrieving "IL" before the structure self-destructs. The next morning, the team enters the fortress after Hevn's sudden abduction. They encounter modified enemies and meet Shuu, a former VOLTS member, before Kumon Horii murders him and releases toxic gas. The gas sends Ginji into a rage while weakening him. When Horii moves for the kill, Akabane intervenes lethally, eliminating the threat but leaving the team to confront the fortress' greater mysteries without their employer.
| 12 | "The Unknown Boy, Makubex"; Transliteration: "Michinaru Shōnen, Makube Ekkusu" (Japanese: 未知なる少年、MAKUBEX) | December 21, 2002 |
Akabane waits as Ginji recovers from the gas, informing him the team went ahead to find IL. Meanwhile, Ban and Shido face former VOLTS members Ryouma and Ayame Magami, who wield modified bodies. Ayame lures Ban into a lab where captive women await modification. Ban unleashes enhanced strength, destroys Ayame's augmented form, and frees the prisoners. Shido defeats Ryouma separately. Reuniting, Ban and Shido deduce MakubeX—the fortress-born Four King—must be behind these experiments, fueling their determination to uncover the truth behind IL and the fortress' dark operations.
| 13 | "Explosion! Fuchouin School Thread Technique"; Transliteration: "Sakuretsu! Fuuchouin ryuugen jutsu" (Japanese: 炸裂!風鳥院流弦術) | December 28, 2002 |
MakubeX monitors the team via cameras as Himiko and Kazuki battle attackers. A fake Kazuki appears, trapping Himiko in threads before being exposed as Kogenta Akame of the West Fuchouin School. The real Kazuki defeats Akame in a thread duel, but Himiko falls under MakubeX's remote control via hidden wiring. As Kazuki attempts to sever the connection, Juubei Kakei intervenes with needle attacks. Kazuki escapes through an explosion while Juubei delivers the unconscious Himiko to MakubeX. The strategist then receives Hevn from Kagami, recognizing her potential value for his unfolding plans.
| 14 | "The New Four Kings"; Transliteration: "Aratanaru Shitenou" (Japanese: 新たなる四天王) | January 11, 2003 |
Ginji hallucinates his younger self and rages when Akabane destroys the illusion. After dispatching more projections, Akabane calms the real Ginji. Meanwhile, Kazuki recovers at Gen Radou's pharmacy, learning of MakubeX's goal to create a distrustful world. Imprisoned, Hevn and Himiko escape by using her mind-control perfume on guards. The groups reunite, tracking MakubeX to the underground garbage facility via Himiko's perfume. En route, wire-controlled puppets attack them until Takuma Fudou appears, challenging Ban over their past conflict. The battle is interrupted by Haruki Emishi's arrival, forcing Fudou to retreat as the team prepares to confront MakubeX and recover the IL.
| 15 | "The Loulan Dance Whip That Whirls in the Night"; Transliteration: "Yami ni Mau Rouranbu Toupen" (Japanese: 闇に舞う楼蘭舞踏鞭) | January 18, 2003 |
Emishi leads Ban and Shido to his safehouse filled with girls. After attacking Shido unconscious, Emishi turns on Ban but falls victim to Evil Eye—Ban had ensnared him earlier, exposing his loyalty to MakubeX. During their battle, Emishi escapes. The team then discovers IL is an atomic implosion lens. While battling more wire-controlled puppets, Kazuki learns Gen raised MakubeX. Separately, Ginji flees Akabane, who independently deduces IL's location in the garbage facility. The revelations culminate with both teams converging on the truth about MakubeX's dangerous weapon and his twisted origins.
| 16 | "Explosion! The Lightning Emperor Angry"; Transliteration: "Bakuhatsu! Ikari no Raitei" (Japanese: 爆発!怒りの雷帝) | January 25, 2003 |
Ginji clashes with Akabane over their fighting ethics as they battle fortress operatives. Meanwhile, MakubeX explains his plan to dominate the fortress' three tiers—Lower Town, Beltline, and Babylon City. When Juubei falsely claims to have killed Kazuki, Ginji erupts in a devastating lightning storm that scatters all combatants. Akabane drives off Kagami, while Juubei begins questioning MakubeX's motives. Separately, Ban and Shido locate the garbage facility housing the IL. Elsewhere, Kazuki rescues Hevn and Himiko from attackers, reuniting the team as they prepare for their final confrontation with MakubeX's forces.
| 17 | "Gathering, Retrieval Team!"; Transliteration: "Shuuketsu, Dakkan Chiimu!" (Japanese: 集結、奪還チーム!) | February 1, 2003 |
MakubeX strategizes while Fudou grows restless for revenge. Kazuki's group reluctantly subdues child puppets before entering a circular chamber where Ban's team arrives. Gen and Ren observe from a control room, revealing Gen designed Babylon City. Six numbered doors surround them. Ginji proposes a dice game to assign doors—all but Hevn participate. Akabane confronts MakubeX separately. Meanwhile, Kazuki and Emishi prepare to duel until Shido and Juubei arrive as reinforcements, setting up parallel battles. The team's separation becomes strategic as each member faces their destined challenge in MakubeX's labyrinthine fortress.
| 18 | "Crash! Shido vs. Emishi"; Transliteration: "Gekitotsu! Shido bāsasu Emishi" (Japanese: 激突!士度VS笑師) | February 8, 2003 |
The battlefield is revealed to be a virtual Grand Canyon simulation. Shido engages Emishi seriously after the first whip strike. Emishi confesses he cannot win but fights anyway to protect his clan under MakubeX's control. When Emishi triggers a flame explosion, Shido rescues him and decides to take him to Gen and Ren, exposing the virtual reality illusion. Meanwhile, Kazuki dominates early with his threads against Juubei's needle attacks. As Juubei struggles, the true nature of MakubeX's deceptive battleground becomes clear, forcing all combatants to reconsider their perceptions of the ongoing conflict.
| 19 | "Oh, My Friend... Kazuki vs. Juubei"; Transliteration: "Tomoyo... Kazuki bāsasu Juubei" (Japanese: 友よ...花月VS十兵衛) | February 15, 2003 |
At the Honky Tonk cafe, a stranger inquires about Ginji's whereabouts, to which Paul and Natsumi respond that he is within the Limitless Fortress. In the virtual Grand Canyon battlefield, Juubei employs his forbidden black needle technique—magnetic projectiles controlled by a black ore stone, though the technique gradually drains his stamina. Kazuki is struck but deduces the mechanism and counters with his threads, creating a whirlwind clash. Flashbacks reveal Juubei's clan once protected Kazuki after the West Fuchouin School burned down, and MakubeX later indoctrinated them. As Hevn and Shido arrive at Gen's pharmacy, Juubei impales himself with his own needles. Kazuki carries his lifeless body from the simulation, overcome with grief.
| 20 | "The Man From Babylon City"; Transliteration: "Babylon City kara Kita Otoko" (Japanese: バビロンシティから来た男) | February 22, 2003 |
Akabane discloses his dual mission: delivering plutonium to MakubeX while honoring his promise to retrieve the IL. From the pharmacy, Hevn and Shido observe Himiko confronting Kagami, confident in her abilities. Their battle unfolds in a virtual Mayan Temple, where Kagami initially overpowers Himiko and prepares a sacrificial ritual. Ban intervenes with Evil Eye, reversing their positions so Kagami becomes the intended sacrifice. Himiko then employs her Acceleration Perfume to outmaneuver Kagami, aided by Ban's coordinated attacks. Forced to retreat, Kagami flees to protect the IL. After Himiko collapses from exhaustion, Ban assists her recovery before departing to confront Fudou in another virtual arena.
| 21 | "Blades of Revenge – Ban vs. Fudou"; Transliteration: "Fukushuu no Yaiba Ban bāsasu Fudou" (Japanese: 復習の刃·蛮VS不動) | March 1, 2003 |
Fudou declares his intent to inflict endless suffering on Ban as retribution for his severed arm. Their battle commences in a virtual Roman Coliseum, observed by Gen and others. Meanwhile, Kazuki arrives at the pharmacy carrying Juubei's body. Ginji, wandering the fortress ruins, encounters the resurrected Shuu and zombie-like children, triggering traumatic memories. Takeru Teshimine appears, recounting Ginji's childhood tragedies and admitting he sought to exploit Ginji's Lightning Emperor form for power. Enraged, Ginji transforms, unleashing catastrophic lightning that disrupts the fortress' illusions. The Coliseum simulation vanishes mid-battle, granting Fudou temporary advantage until Ban recites an empowering incantation, destroying Fudou's prosthetic arm. Ban then pursues Ginji to halt his rampage.
| 22 | "Awakening! The Advent of the Lightning Emperor"; Transliteration: "Kakusei! Raitei Kōurin" (Japanese: 覚醒!雷帝降臨) | March 8, 2003 |
The Teshimine confronting Ginji is revealed as an illusion, while the real Teshimine remains at Honky Tonk. Ginji wounds Sakura with lightning before Akabane arrives, evading his attacks with superior speed. A blackout in Lower Town forces Kazuki and Emishi to abandon Gen and Ren. During their clash, Ban intervenes, appearing injured but revealing he used Evil Eye to feign death, shocking Ginji back to sanity. At Honky Tonk, Teshimine departs amicably. Meanwhile, MakubeX's bomb installation is thwarted by Gen's system interference, though an intruder program slows the recovery team. Akabane admits delivering plutonium, betraying Ban and Ginji. As Akabane takes Ginji to retrieve the IL, Ban faces a resurrected Fudou.
| 23 | "Attack! Virtual Corps"; Transliteration: "Shuugeki! Baacharu Gundan" (Japanese: 襲撃!ヴァーチャル軍団) | March 15, 2003 |
Fudou ambushes Ban, but Shido intervenes. Suddenly, cloned replicas of Fudou and Akabane materialize—products of MakubeX's intruder program. Kazuki and Emishi deduce the system generates clones from combat data and assist Shido against the Fudou duplicates. Meanwhile, Akabane battles his own clones while Ginji reunites with Ban and Hevn to confront MakubeX. At the pharmacy, Sakura awakens, learning from Juubei that MakubeX miscalculated. Gen admits to raising MakubeX, who stole Babylon City's data for his simulations. Juubei, Sakura, and Himiko depart to stop him. After defeating their clones, Shido's group joins Ban's team. Kagami permits all seven to proceed, revealing MakubeX awaits them.
| 24 | "The Final Fight! Ginji vs. Makubex"; Transliteration: "Saigo no tatakai! Ginji bāsasu Makube Ekkusu" (Japanese: 最後の戦い!銀次 VS MAKUBEX) | March 22, 2003 |
Ginji implores MakubeX to surrender the IL, but when refused, challenges him directly. MakubeX counters Ginji's attack, electrocuting the six observers, then morphs the room into a visceral illusion of his own body—blurring reality. Ginji perceives MakubeX's anguish and fights to free him. Their evenly matched battle prompts Ban to question whether the Limitless Fortress itself is virtual, given rapid healing and amplified strength. A flashback reveals Ban originally recruited Ginji due to his instability as the Lightning Emperor. Ginji lands a decisive strike, exposing MakubeX's ruse: the bodily illusion was a diversion to complete the bomb's assembly.
| 25 | "Get Back the Limitless Future!"; Transliteration: "Mugen no Mirai o Tori Kaese!" (Japanese: 無限の未来を奪り還せ!) | April 5, 2003 |
The intruder program prevents the GetBackers from stopping MakubeX, who reveals he accessed Babylon City's Archive, a prophetic database justifying his rebellion. He offers the fortress' deity a choice: freedom or annihilation. Through Evil Eye, Ban forces MakubeX to witness his own dystopian future—a ruined fortress devoid of the VOLTS. Though MakubeX detonates the IL in this vision, Ban destroys the real detonator. Ginji pursues MakubeX as he attempts suicide, saving him while affirming his worth. Redeemed, MakubeX reforms the New VOLTS to protect Lower Town and returns the IL (a floppy disk). The masked clients are killed by Akabane during the exchange, voiding the GetBackers' payment. Ban and Ginji return to Honky Tonk, unpaid yet again.

=== Season 2 ===
| No. | Title | Original release date |
|---|---|---|
| 26 | "Stream Recovery: The Hot Springs Travel Diary!?"; Transliteration: "Yukemuri Onsen Dakkan Kikou!?" (Japanese: 湯けむり温泉奪還紀行!?) | April 12, 2003 |
Ban and Ginji are dispatched to recover a stolen ring at a hot springs resort, accompanied by Paul, Natsumi, and Hevn. When a thief snatches a woman's necklace and escapes unseen, the duo stakes out the ladies' baths, suspecting a nude bather near the healing springs. There, they encounter Kazuki and Juubei—the latter seeking restoration for his blindness from their prior battle. Juubei requests comedic training from Ginji (later revealed as inept), citing Emishi's mockery. After Juubei departs, Natsumi and Hevn report a stolen wristwatch. The pursuit leads to a monkey troop, whose combat prowess unexpectedly challenges Ban and Ginji.
| 27 | "High School Girl vs. Recovery Service"; Transliteration: "Jyoshikousei bāsasu Dakkanya" (Japanese: 女子高生VS奪還屋) | April 19, 2003 |
Ban and Ginji accept a job from Mr. Sasakida to retrieve a stolen briefcase allegedly taken by teenage girls. Their investigation leads them to Riko Tachibana, a manipulative high schooler who extorts meals, clothing, and jewelry in exchange for information. After enlisting Shido, Kazuki, and Himiko—who grow increasingly frustrated—they locate the briefcase in a garbage heap, only to discover it is empty except for a disk. When Sasakida arrives with armed associates and takes Riko hostage, the GetBackers intervene. Akabane appears, revealing he was hired to transport the briefcase. Sasakida confesses he sought the disk to regain his demoted position. The team returns the disk, Akabane befriends Riko, and the others pursue Ban and Ginji for involving them in the ordeal.
| 28 | "The Man Who Lost His Past"; Transliteration: "Kako o nakushita otoko" (Japanese: 過去を失くした男) | April 26, 2003 |
Ban and Ginji are hired by Yuuji Takamura to recover his lost memories from a car accident three months prior. As they investigate, Paul discovers Yuuji's supposed memories—provided by his girlfriend Midori—are fabricated. Midori pleads with the GetBackers to halt the search, insisting some truths are better forgotten. Returning to the accident site, they are ambushed by a sniper from a lighthouse. Ban employs the Evil Eye to restore Yuuji's true memories, revealing both are underworld spies seeking to escape their past. That night, Yuuji and Midori depart for Europe, leaving their criminal lives behind.
| 29 | "Get Back the Arms of the Goddess!"; Transliteration: "Megami no Ude o ToriKaese!" (Japanese: 女神の腕を奪り還せ!) | May 3, 2003 |
Ban is interrupted during negotiations with Hevn by Clayman's arrival. Clayman hires the GetBackers to recover the Venus de Milo's arms—not for profit, but to preserve the statue's eternal mystery. They travel to Okinawa, where the arms are to be auctioned aboard a ship. Meanwhile, Hera and Natsuhiko Miroku prepare to unveil the restored statue globally, while Mouen Ryuu oversees security. The GetBackers are tricked by Emishi (working with Shido) into wasting Ban's Evil Eye usage. At the harbor, Akabane—the arms' transporter—tests Ban briefly before departing. The duo attempts to board via wine cask but are intercepted by Ryuu's assassins, Shakuryuu and Hyouko. Ginji reaches the departing ship as Ban is struck down by Natsuhiko and falls into the sea.
| 30 | "Mystery Assassins: The Miroku Brothers"; Transliteration: "Nazo no Shikaku · Miroku Kyoudai" (Japanese: 謎の刺客·弥勒兄弟) | May 10, 2003 |
Ginji battles Akabane aboard the ship, impressing him enough to earn a warning about the protection service's strength. Separately, Yukihiko Miroku befriends Ginji, while Hera chastises Akabane for failing to stop the intruders. Ban arrives via jet ski, joining Shido and Emishi—who infiltrated using dolphins—in confronting Ryuu's assassins, Shakuryuu and Hyouko. Emishi recognizes their Chinese martial arts, enabling their escape via Shido's summoned flying fish. Meanwhile, Akabane postpones his duel with Ban until Battleship Island, offering cigarettes as an odd gesture of respect. The ship arrives amid fireworks, with an unconscious Ginji under Yukihiko's watch, setting the stage for the final confrontation.
| 31 | "Hera and Kait"; Transliteration: "Hera to Kaito" (Japanese: ヘラとカイト) | May 17, 2003 |
Shido and Emishi survey Battleship Island when Ban collapses mid-conflict; they reluctantly safeguard him despite mutual disdain. Meanwhile, Yukihiko justifies sparing Ginji as bait for Ban, having immobilized him by dislocating his joints. Hera arrives, revealing her vendetta against sculptor Kait—who abandoned her for the Venus de Milo's perfection. When Ginji condemns her revenge plot, she orders his execution, but he escapes through a window. Ban awakens to learn Shido's true mission: the replica statue contains Aphrodite, a lethal drug masked as art. Natsuhiko's transmitter leads armed guards to the reunited team, cornering them as the auction's dark purpose is exposed.
| 32 | "The Mission Starts! Ginji vs. Miroku"; Transliteration: "Sakusen kaishi! Ginji bāsasu Miroku" (Japanese: 作戦開始!銀次VS弥勒) | May 24, 2003 |
The team divides after defeating the guards: Shido and Emishi confront Shakuryuu and Hyouko underground, overcoming their enhanced flame and ice techniques through tenacity. Meanwhile, Ban duels Akabane on the surface while Ginji battles the Miroku brothers—discovering they share one body. After defeating Natsuhiko with an electric surge, Ginji faces Yukihiko's black hole ring blade. A distant explosion alarms Ban and Akabane, suggesting Ginji's possible demise. Separately, Ryuu anticipates global domination through the Aphrodite drug auction, while Hera clings to revenge as her sole purpose, dismissing Ginji's earlier idealism. Shido and Emishi proceed toward the auction hall as the conflicts converge.
| 33 | "Get Back the Eternal Goddess!"; Transliteration: "Towa no Megami o ToriKaese!" (Japanese: 永久の女神を奪り還せ!) | May 31, 2003 |
Following the explosion, Ban outmaneuvers Akabane with decoy balloons before pursuing Ginji. Yukihiko concedes defeat after Ginji explains how he neutralized the black hole. During the auction's blackout, Hera reflects on Kait's philosophy of beauty through loss. Ban then uses Evil Eye via broadcast, causing chaos as the team escapes with the arms and drug-laden replica. Hera fires at their boat, puncturing the fuel tank—forcing them to jettison their cargo. Though unpaid, Clayman approves as the Venus' mystery endures. Later, the GetBackers reunite Hera with Kait, now debilitated by Aphrodite, revealing his hidden masterpiece of her. Ryuu's attempted deal with MakubeX proves an Evil Eye illusion, culminating in his arrest.
| 34 | "The GetBackers Break Up?! The Enemy is Ban Midou!"; Transliteration: "GB Kaisan?! Teki wa Midou Ban!" (Japanese: GB解散?!敵は美堂蛮!) | June 7, 2003 |
Ban and Ginji stage a breakup to infiltrate Daitetsu Mahoroba's estate, targeting the legendary Aztec Star diamond. Ginji recalls Ban's failed attempt one year prior with Himiko and Yamato, thwarted by Daitetsu's explosive decoy. While Ginji defeats a Bruce Lee-inspired bodyguard, Ban is captured but uses the Jagan to fake their mutual demise. The ruse allows Ginji to secure the diamond. During their escape with Shido and Himiko's assistance, Ginji drops the Aztec Star, which is snatched by one of Shido's crows. The GetBackers once again lose their reward, continuing their streak of misfortunes.
| 35 | "Get Back the Flame of Life!"; Transliteration: "Inochi no Honō o Tori Kaese!" (Japanese: 命の炎を奪り還せ!) | June 14, 2003 |
Hevn tasks the GetBackers with retrieving rare Bombay blood for Yumiko Imai's life-saving transfusion. The blood is held by the Transporters (Akabane and Maguruma), who are delivering it to the mafia. During a highway pursuit, Akabane repels Ginji and blocks Ban with explosives. As Yumiko's condition worsens, Ginji recalls a similarly ill friend from his past in the Limitless Fortress, fueling his resolve. In a twist, Akabane betrays the mafia, surrendering the blood to Ginji, who defeats the syndicate using amplified lightning. Ban arrives via helicopter, transporting Ginji and the blood to the hospital in time to save Yumiko, fulfilling Ginji's emotional vow.
| 36 | "Children of Destiny"; Transliteration: "Unmei no Kodomo Tachi" (Japanese: 運命の子供たち) | June 21, 2003 |
The GetBackers and Himiko are hired to recover a kidnapped infant from CEO Takao Kiyokawa, who disapproves of his son Yuuichiro's marriage. During the extraction, Himiko—herself a former abductee—relives trauma while evading pursuers in the woods, recalling her brother Yamato's similar protection of her. The team learns of the Last Children curse, which drives descendants to madness, explaining Yamato's request for Ban to end his life preemptively. Returning to Honky Tonk, they discover Kiyokawa orchestrated the kidnapping to reunite the family. The resolution leaves Himiko unaware of Yamato's fate, while Ban silently reaffirms his promise to him, symbolized by the cigarette lighter.
| 37 | "Do Your Best, Natsumi!"; Transliteration: "Natsumi Ganbaru!" (Japanese: 夏実がんばる!) | June 28, 2003 |
Ban and Ginji travel to the beach on what appears to be a leisure trip disguised as work. Meanwhile, an elderly woman visits Honky Tonk Café seeking help retrieving a hidden memento from her former home, now occupied by jewel thieves who ignore her requests. Natsumi accepts the case despite Paul's surprise. After failing to recruit Shido at Madoka's residence, Natsumi enlists Emishi's help. Their initial infiltration attempts through disguises prove unsuccessful, leading them to stake out the property. During their surveillance, Natsumi relates the sentimental value of objects by mentioning her own keepsake from Ban and Ginji. When the thieves temporarily leave, Natsumi enters alone but triggers a security trap. After escaping capture through quick thinking and ping-pong skills, she is nearly overpowered until Emishi and Kazuki intervene. The recovered memento is revealed to be a collection of love letters from the woman's late husband.
| 38 | "A Recital Just For You"; Transliteration: "Anata dake no Recital" (Japanese: あなただけのリサイタル) | July 5, 2003 |
After losing a shogi match to Natsumi, Ban and Ginji wash dishes at Honky Tonk while Shido prepares for Madoka's recital with Hevn's assistance. When a hostage situation arises, Shido intervenes using his animal command abilities. Kirihito, a former mafia rival, ambushes Shido to prove insect mastery surpasses beast mastery. With Ban and Ginji's aid, Shido prevails, though Ban prevents lethal retaliation, reminding him of Madoka's performance. Himiko erases Kirihito's memories per Ban's request. Arriving late, Shido finds the recital ended but discovers Madoka waiting onstage. She plays a private piece for him, deepening their bond as he reflects on their connection.
| 39 | "Ginji's Hospitalized? It's a Hospital! Everyone Assembled"; Transliteration: "Ginji Nyūin? Byōin da yo! Zenin Shūgō" (Japanese: 銀次入院?病院ダヨ!全員集合!) | July 12, 2003 |
During a rooftop assignment, Ginji spots dropped food and instinctively gives chase, only to slip and fall, landing himself in the hospital and forcing the team to abandon the mission. Ban seethes as Shido steps in to complete their job. When hospital nurses ask for help retrieving confiscated patient letters, Ban and Shido turn the task into a fierce competition, each wagering their professional pride. Their rivalry spirals out of control until the letters are accidentally flung from the rooftop—only for Emishi to later recover them, much to the nurses' relief. Meanwhile, chaotic misunderstandings unfold in the hospital: Kazuki is repeatedly mistaken for a nurse, Himiko nearly administers unnecessary CPR to Ginji, and Akabane's ominous visit startles Ginji into unconsciousness. After a jolt of static electricity revives him, Ginji takes one look at Akabane and promptly faints again.
| 40 | "Monkey Counterattack!"; Transliteration: "Gyakushuu no Saru!" (Japanese: 逆襲の猿!) | July 19, 2003 |
Ban, Ginji, and Natsumi travel to Madoka's summer house when a monkey steals their food. Ban and Ginji chase it into a forest but lose it. Ginji finds the food—only to realize it is a trap as monkeys surround them. They recognize the thieves as the same group that stole jewelry from a hot spring. Returning empty-handed, they see the boss monkey mockingly eating their food. Natsumi reveals she had prepared their favorite meals, deepening their frustration. At the summer house, Shido dismisses their story, but Madoka urges him to act after spotting the monkeys stealing from a food stand. Shido confronts them in the forest, defeats the boss monkey, and gains the group's submission. Ban and Ginji encounter the boss monkey again, falling into the same trap before discovering Shido now leads the monkeys. After tasting the stolen food, Shido declares it inedible, prompting Ban and Ginji to retreat. Later, at the hot spring, Shido insults the food, upsetting Madoka. The next day, the monkeys resume stealing, leading to a fight between Shido, Ban, and Ginji—ending in their arrest.
| 41 | "Farewell, My Beloved"; Transliteration: "Saraba Itoshiki Hito yo" (Japanese: さらば愛しき人よ) | July 26, 2003 |
Ban and Ginji investigate a stolen government alloy, but Hevn cancels their mission after recognizing her former partner Eiji in their footage. Flashbacks reveal Eiji was shot during a commando raid on their research facility years prior. Hevn infiltrates the thieves' ship alone, discovering Eiji alive—now revealed as an agent who manipulated her to steal the alloy. When Ban and Ginji (disguised as commandos) assist her, Eiji's alloy-reinforced clothing neutralizes their attacks. Following tense exchanges and evidence of his sincere concern, Hevn spares him. The following day at Honky Tonk, she presents the GetBackers with a new assignment in her usual manner, restoring their typical working relationship.
| 42 | "The Cost of Betrayal"; Transliteration: "Uragiri no daishou" (Japanese: 裏切りの代償) | August 2, 2003 |
At Honky Tonk, jobless Ban and Ginji can't pay their tab. Paul's old associate Azuma arrives, seeking help retrieving an item from Sakai—a former partner who betrayed their thief group years ago. A flashback shows their final heist: Sakai sided with the mafia, causing Azuma's apparent death. Paul and Azuma recruit Ban and Ginji to steal back their antique vase, offering to clear their debt. Infiltrating the mafia mansion, Azuma betrays the plan to confront Sakai. Captured, he threatens to detonate the building. During the chaos, Ban's Jagan forces Sakai to confess he wanted Azuma to kill him. The reunited thieves part ways after destroying the mansion.
| 43 | "The Man Who Came Back... The Limitless Fortress, Once More"; Transliteration: "Kaettekita Otoko... Mugenjyou, Futatabi" (Japanese: 帰ってきた男...無限城、再び) | August 9, 2003 |
Kagami witnesses Kurusu's return to the Limitless Fortress while Sarai observes from above. Sakura is attacked by former VOLTS member Kaoru Ujiie, who brands her with a lethal Seal of Flame. Himiko rescues Sakura and brings her to Honky Tonk, where she reveals MakubeX was kidnapped after his Archive data project was destroyed. Inside the Fortress, Emishi and Juubei search for MakubeX. Emishi deduces Kurusu's involvement after fighting former VOLTS member Jouya. Kurusu threatens Gen at his pharmacy, while Ren leaves with Uryuu after being promised a meeting with Kazuki. Ban's team (Ban, Ginji, Kazuki, Shido, Himiko) enters the fortress to rescue MakubeX and find a cure for Sakura's seal, leaving her in Hevn's care at the cafe.
| 44 | "The Last of the Four Kings"; Transliteration: "Saigo no Shitennou" (Japanese: 最後の四天王) | August 16, 2003 |
In the monitoring room, Kaoru, Uryuu and Jouya argue while Ren ignores them. Spotting the GetBackers on surveillance, Ren alerts them, sending the trio to find Kurusu. Ban's group searches MakubeX's empty computer room before heading to Gen's pharmacy. There, injured Emishi reveals Jouya attacked him and that Kurusu has returned, kidnapping MakubeX. In the Archive, Kurusu betrays MakubeX, declaring the Lightning Emperor obsolete. The teams split up: Ban, Ginji and Himiko get separated in virtual reality—Himiko fights Kaoru at the pyramid while Ban faces Fudou. Shido's group also fractures; Kazuki and Juubei battle Jouya and Uryuu in the Grand Canyon before escaping. Shido confronts Kurusu but is overpowered until Teshimine intervenes.
| 45 | "Demon of Revenge: Fudou Passes Away"; Transliteration: "Fukushuu Ki Fudou Iku" (Japanese: 復讐鬼·不動逝く) | August 23, 2003 |
A flashback shows Teshimine admitting to Masaki his plan to exploit Ginji's power for control of the Limitless Fortress. Overcome with guilt, he later left, entrusting Ginji to Masaki. Now, Teshimine attacks Masaki for breaking this trust. Sakura's condition worsens as Hevn cares for her. After Natsumi helps with cold towels, Hevn and Paul access his old computer. Sakura struggles downstairs, asking to contact MakubeX. At the Mayan temple, Himiko's Flame Perfume and Puppet Perfume fail against Kaoru's combustion ability. Using excessive Acceleration Perfume, Himiko defeats Kaoru but collapses. Ban fights Fudou, ultimately trapping him in an Evil Eye illusion until death. Kagami appears, warning Ban about Himiko's danger. Shido reaches Gen for treatment after his injuries. MakubeX tries sending Archive data but is blocked by Ren. Ban brings unconscious Himiko to Gen as Shido reveals Masaki killed Teshimine. At the Honky Tonk, Sakura sees MakubeX's message confirming Masaki's betrayal before collapsing. Paul and Hevn find an Archive map meant for Ginji. When emails fail, Hevn sends Akabane to deliver it physically. Ginji, alone and scared, mistakes Kagenuma for Ban. Akabane arrives at the Honky Tonk, preparing to take the data to Ginji's group.
| 46 | "The Brain Trust"; Transliteration: "Burein Torasuto" (Japanese: ブレイン·トラスト) | August 30, 2003 |
Sarai gives Ginji cryptic directions before disappearing. Akabane arrives in Lower Town and delivers a crucial data disc to the GetBackers at Gen's pharmacy. When examined, the disc reveals a map pinpointing MakubeX's location in the dangerous Archive sector. Under pressure, Gen confesses his former membership in the Brain Trust—the shadowy organization that designed the Limitless Fortress as an unethical experiment, using its residents as unwitting test subjects. The team (Ban, Ginji, Kazuki, Juubei) reluctantly allows Akabane to accompany them as they venture into the hazardous Beltline. Meanwhile in the monitoring room, tensions explode when Jouya berates Ren for letting Kazuki escape earlier. Uryuu intervenes, hinting at his conflicted loyalties, while Ren quietly questions her own artificial existence. Upon entering the Beltline, the group finds themselves in a deceptive VR flower field. Ren remotely manipulates the simulation, causing Ginji to suddenly vanish into another sector where he comes face-to-face with Masaki. The former ally coldly declares Ginji obsolete before attacking with his territory power, forcing Ginji to defend himself against his once-trusted comrade.
| 47 | "Storm the Beltline! Ginji vs. Masaki"; Transliteration: "Beltline Tounyuu! Ginji bāsasu Masaki" (Japanese: ベルトライン突入!銀次VS柾) | September 6, 2003 |
Ban, Kazuki, Juubei, and Akabane search for Ginji, still trapped in virtual reality. MakubeX creates an escape door, allowing them to exit Ren's VR. Masaki fights Ginji, who refuses to fight back, but Kazuki stops Masaki's killing strike with his strings. After a warning, Masaki retreats, and Juubei destroys Ren's surveillance camera. Kaoru and Jouya battle again while Uryuu leaves. Ginji heals by absorbing the Fortress's electricity, angering Ban for risking his transformation into the Lightning Emperor. Sarai reappears, and Ginji agrees to move forward, accepting his guidance. The group follows, though Akabane stays behind as Kagami arrives. Sarai leads them onward, explaining Akabane's separate path. Juubei splits off to duel Uryuu, while Kazuki accompanies Ginji. Ban deduces Sarai's ties to Babylon City, prompting questions about Ginji's past. They find Kaoru and Jouya. Juubei fights Uryuu to settle their rivalry. Ban defeats Jouya, while Ginji faces Kaoru, who demands his love or death. He embraces her instead, extinguishing her flames, and tells her the Lightning Emperor is gone—but he remembers her love. Meanwhile, Masaki confronts MakubeX over his betrayal.
| 48 | "Fated Showdown – Ban vs. Akabane"; Transliteration: "Shukumei no Taiketsu Ban bāsasu Akabane" (Japanese: 宿命の対決、·蛮VS赤屍) | September 13, 2003 |
MakubeX is revealed to be an illusion, like Ren. Masaki leaves him in the Archive and departs. Ban and Ginji abandon Kaoru, hoping she will choose to help recover Sakura. Meanwhile, Juubei and Uryuu continue their duel. A flashback reveals Kazuki, Juubei, and Uryuu once formed a group, but Uryuu's overwhelming strength caused its dissolution. As Juubei and Uryuu prepare to unleash their full power—needles against force palm—Kazuki intervenes, aware Ren is observing them. Ban is led to Akabane, while Ginji faces Masaki. Masaki admits he was sent by The Brain Trust to monitor Lower Town and that he betrayed Ginji after Teshimine entrusted him to his care. Meanwhile, Gen enacts a scheme with Ren and Paul's assistance. Ban and Akabane battle as equals, their skills perfectly matched. However, Ban declares that Ginji inspired him to reject violence in favor of protection—a conviction that allows him to defeat Akabane.
| 49 | "GetBackers"; Transliteration: "GettoBakkaazu" (Japanese: ゲットバッカーズ) | September 20, 2003 |
Ginji defeats Masaki and questions his motives. Meanwhile, Kanou confronts Ren, discovering her involvement in Makubex's rescue, but Shido and Emishi intervene. Masaki reveals to Ginji that The Brain Trust sent him to erase Makubex—an illusion he opposed. He joins Ginji and Ban in the Archive, only to witness Makubex deleting his own existence. Ginji unleashes his lightning, destroying the Archive and cutting power to the Limitless Fortress. When emergency power restores the system, Makubex is revived—his data already transferred out, freeing Lower Town from The Brain Trust's experiments. Teshimine reappears, reuniting with Ginji. At the Honky Tonk cafe, Kaoru removes the seal from Sakura's arm, healing her. Ren returns to Gen's pharmacy. Ban and Ginji resume their work as a recovery team, their lives returning to normal.

== See also ==
- List of GetBackers characters
