= Nam Sang-mi =

South Korean actress (born 1984)

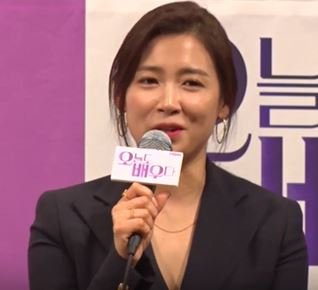
- Nam in 2019
- Born: May 3, 1984 (age 42); Yeongju, South Korea
- Occupation: Actress
- Years active: 2001–present
- Agent: JR Entertainment
- Spouse: Lim Jae-hyun (m. 2015)
- Children: 1

Korean name
- Hangul: 남상미
- Hanja: 南相美
- RR: Nam Sangmi
- MR: Nam Sangmi
- Website: Official website

Nam Sang-mi (Korean: 남상미; born May 3, 1984) is a South Korean actress.

== Career ==
Nam was working in a Lotteria restaurant near Hanyang University in the fall of 2001 when someone posted her personal photos on the internet. Her popularity as an ulzzang led to her discovery as an actress. She made her debut in the 2003 melodrama series Love Letter, and began her acting career by taking small roles in films, TV dramas, and commercials. Her first leading role came with Sweet Spy in 2005. This was followed by leading roles in comedy drama Bad Family (2006) and action romance drama Time Between Dog and Wolf (2007).

In 2008, Nam starred as an aspiring food columnist in Gourmet, a hit series based on Huh Young-man's manhwa Sikgaek.

Nam said regarding her role in horror film Possessed (2009), "The moment I read the script, I wanted this part badly. After such a long time away from films, it excited me, and I can show a completely different side than I've shown in dramas." She next played the titular character in romantic comedy drama Invincible Lee Pyung Kang.

After starring in close friend Ku Hye-sun's short film You (2010), Ku cast her as the leading lady of her second feature film The Peach Tree (2012). Meanwhile, on the small screen, Nam starred in the retro music drama Lights and Shadows (2011) and romantic comedy drama Goddess of Marriage (2013).

In 2014, Nam reunited with Time Between Dog and Wolf costar Lee Joon-gi in the period drama Gunman in Joseon. This was followed by a starring role in the comedy film Slow Video.

In 2017, Nam starred in the office comedy drama Good Manager. In 2018, Nam starred in the mystery thriller series Let Me Introduce Her.

== Personal life ==
=== Marriage and family ===
Nam married a businessman at a small church in Yangpyeong County, Gyeonggi Province on January 24, 2015. She gave birth to a baby girl on the afternoon of November 12, 2015.

== Filmography ==
=== Film ===
Year	Title	Role
2004	Spy Girl	Nam Jin-ah
2004	Too Beautiful to Lie	Jae-eun
2004	Dead Friend	Su-in
2005	She's on Duty	Cha Seung-hee
2005	Never to Lose	Lee Hae-ryung
2009	Possessed	Hee-jin
2010	You (short film)	
2012	The Peach Tree	Park Seung-ah
2014	Slow Video	Bong Soo-mi

=== Television series ===
Year	Title	Role	Network
2003	Love Letter	young Im Kyung-eun	MBC
2003	Open Drama Man & Woman: "Spring Came to Me Like a Hooligan"	Sun-young	SBS
2003	Drama City: "The Truth about Wormwood and Garlic"	Sa-rang	KBS2
2003	Escape from Unemployment	Wang Bit-na	SBS
2004	Not Alone	Sang-mi	SBS
2005	Drama City: "Freesias, Teddy Bears, Hot Chocolate and..."	Choi Da-young	KBS2
2005	My Sweetheart, My Darling	Yoo In-kyung	KBS1
2005	Sweet Spy	Lee Soon-ae	MBC
2006	Bad Family	Kim Yang-ah	SBS
2007	Time Between Dog and Wolf	Seo Ji-woo	MBC
2008	Gourmet	Kim Jin-soo	SBS
2009	Invincible Lee Pyung Kang	Lee Pyung-kang	KBS2
2010	Life Is Beautiful	Boo Yeon-joo	SBS
2011	Lights and Shadows	Lee Jung-hye	MBC
2012	KBS Drama Special: "Like a Miracle"	Han Myung-joo	KBS2
2013	Goddess of Marriage	Song Ji-hye	SBS
2014	Gunman in Joseon	Jung Soo-in	KBS2
2017	Good Manager	Yoon Ha-kyung	KBS2
2018	Let Me Introduce Her	Ji Eun-han	SBS

=== Variety shows ===
Year	Title	Notes
2003	Declaration of Freedom Saturday Big Operation: The War of Roses	
2004	Brain Survival	
2004	Real Situation Saturday - X-Man	
2005	Good Sunday - X-Man	
2006	Live TV Entertainment	MC

=== Music video appearances ===
Year	Song title	Artist
2002	"Christmas Miracle"	Shin Seung-hun
2004	"She's Laughing..."	Kim Hyung-joong
2005	"Love Is..."	Vintage Blue
2006	"Difficult Words to Say"	Lee Seung-gi
2009	"Have a Drink"	Zia

== Awards and nominations ==
Year	Award	Category	Nominated work	Result
2006	42nd Baeksang Arts Awards	Best New Actress (TV)	Sweet Spy	Nominated
2006	MBC Drama Awards	Best New Actress	Sweet Spy	Won
2007	MBC Drama Awards	Excellence Award, Actress	Time Between Dog and Wolf	Won
2008	3rd Seoul International Drama Awards	Most Popular Actress	Time Between Dog and Wolf	Won
2008	SBS Drama Awards	Excellence Award, Actress in a Special Planning Drama	Gourmet	Nominated
2009	KBS Drama Awards	Excellence Award, Actress in a Miniseries	Invincible Lee Pyung Kang	Nominated
2010	SBS Drama Awards	Best Supporting Actress in a Weekend/Daily Drama	Life Is Beautiful	Nominated
2012	MBC Drama Awards	Top Excellence Award, Actress in a Special Project Drama	Lights and Shadows	Nominated
2013	SBS Drama Awards	Top Excellence Award, Actress in a Weekend/Daily Drama	Goddess of Marriage	Won
2013	SBS Drama Awards	Top 10 Stars	Goddess of Marriage	Won
2014	KBS Drama Awards	Top Excellence Award, Actress	Gunman in Joseon	Nominated
2014	KBS Drama Awards	Excellence Award, Actress in a Mid-length Drama	Gunman in Joseon	Won
2014	KBS Drama Awards	Best Couple Award with Lee Joon-gi	Gunman in Joseon	Won
2018	6th APAN Star Awards	Excellence Award, Actress in a Serial Drama	Let Me Introduce Her	Nominated
2018	SBS Drama Awards	Producers Award for Actress	Let Me Introduce Her	Won
2018	SBS Drama Awards	Top Excellence Award, Actress in a Daily and Weekend Drama	Let Me Introduce Her	Nominated
