= J Style =

Single album by Lee Joon-gi
- Released: April 20, 2009
- Genre: Dance, pop
- Label: Mentor Entertainment
- Producer: Yejeon Media

J Style is the second maxi single by Lee Joon-gi produced with musician Kim Hyeong-seok. The album includes four new songs, including three songs from his previous album My Jun, My Style. One of the songs, "Selfless Dedicated Trees", was written by Lee's fans at the Episode Two – Mask fan meeting in April 2009. J Style reached the first rank in the Hanteo chart within a day of its release.

== Background ==
Originally an actor, Lee Joon-gi performed three songs at a fan concert in 2006, which were later released to online music services; these songs were not specially promoted. While Lee was preparing for his second fan concert, Episode Two – Mask, in April 2009, a preview of the music video for "J Style", which he was to show at the event, was released. Photos from inside the album were also leaked to the internet two months later. On April 14, it was reported that he would make his musical debut. Lee stated during a press conference that the release was a project and did not spell for an official debut; he sought to "repay" his fans through its release.

== Release and promotion ==
On April 18, 2009, Lee held his second fan concert, Episode Two – Mask, and first released the "J Style" music video to an audience of 6,000 global fans. J Style was pre-sold during the concert, in order to prevent illegal sharing; it was officially released on April 20, 2009. Two months later, Lee opened a fan meeting in China, for fans who were unable to attend the previous concert due to visa issues. A special edition of the album was also sold exclusively at a Japanese fan concert. Various music programs requested Lee to appear on their shows upon his debut, but he reportedly rejected every offer. Korean broadcaster KBS also deemed the title track, "J Style", unfit to air on their stations, judging its lyrics as suggestive.

=== Music videos ===
For 5 months, Lee recorded an exclusive music video titled J Style for his Episode Two – Mask fan meeting. Produced by film director Chang, the video's concept was "cyber oriental", and featured "dreamy and groundbreaking images". For the video, 5 different sets were built, which were cycled through with an automatic stage change mechanism. Model Yoon Ji-a, who Chang had previously worked with, appeared in the video as a woman who seduces Lee.

A music video for "혼잣말" was produced as well. It features Lee driving in a sports car towards "the middle of a certain memory".

== Track listing ==
Bold tracks are noted as the promotional tracks of the album.

No.	Title	Lyrics	Music	Translated Title	Length
1.	"J Style"	Lee Tae-gun	Kim Hyeong-seok^{[a]} (ko)
2.	"혼잣말" (Honjatmal)		Kim^{[a]}	Soliloquy
3.	"I'm Ready"
4.	"아낌없이 주는나무" (akkimeopsi juneunnamu)	Lee	Kim^{[a]}	Selfless Dedicated Trees
5.	"한마디만" (hanmadiman)			One Word
6.	"사랑을 몰라" (sarangeul molla)			I Don't Know How to Love
7.	"바보사랑" (Babosarang)			Foolish Love
8.	"혼잣말" (instrumental)

- ^{^[a]} signifies a composer who is also the arranger.
