= Gunman in Joseon =

2014 South Korean television series

- Promotional poster
- Also known as: The Joseon Gunman; The Joseon Shooter; Gunfighter of Joseon
- Hangul: 조선 총잡이
- Hanja: 朝鮮 銃잡이
- RR: Joseon chongjabi
- MR: Chosŏn ch'ongjabi
- Genre: Historical; Action; Drama; Romance
- Written by: Lee Jung-woo; Han Hee-jung
- Directed by: Kim Jung-min; Cha Young-hoon
- Starring: Lee Joon-gi; Nam Sang-mi; Jeon Hye-bin; Han Joo-wan; Yu Oh-seong
- Music by: Lee Ji-yong (이지용)
- Country of origin: South Korea
- Original language: Korean
- No. of episodes: 22

Production
- Executive producer: Lee Gun-joon
- Producer: Yoon Jae-hyuk
- Production location: Korea
- Running time: Wednesdays and Thursdays at 21:55 (KST)
- Production company: KBS Media

Original release
- Network: KBS2
- Release: June 25 – September 4, 2014

Gunman in Joseon (Korean: 조선 총잡이) is a 2014 South Korean television series starring Lee Joon-gi, Nam Sang-mi, Jeon Hye-bin, Han Joo-wan, and Yu Oh-seong. It aired on KBS2 from June 25 to September 4, 2014 on Wednesdays and Thursdays at 21:55 for 22 episodes.

== Synopsis ==
The story begins in 1876, the third year of Emperor Gojong's reign. It is a time of great upheaval and rapid modernization, with conflict brewing between the two leading political factions, the Sugu (conservative) and the Kaehwa (enlightenment). Those on the Kaehwa side support Gojong's enlightenment policies during this time of change; Joseon was known as a hermit kingdom through the nineteenth century, keen to isolate itself from foreign influence. In previous years, Joseon had rejected Western overtures to open trade lines, which had led to military clashes with American and French forces. While newer ideology advocated a more open policy, it had yet to take root. Adding to the mounting tensions, recently Gojong's Kaehwa supporters have begun, one by one, to fall victim to a mysterious figure toting a brand-new style of gun.

Park Yoon-kang (Lee Joon-gi) is the son of the last great swordsman of nineteenth century Joseon. After the tragic death of his father and the enslavement of his younger sister, Yoon-kang trades his sword for a Western-made lever action rifle as he embarks on a revenge mission, but ends up becoming a hero for the people.

== Cast ==
=== Main ===
- Lee Joon-gi as Park Yoon-kang/Hasegawa Hanjo
  - Seo Dong-hyun as young Park Yoon-kang

Estranged from his father Park Jin-han, Yoon-kang lives an indolent life, drinking and flirting at the gisaeng house while performing daredevil acts with his sword for extra tips. Like his father who is a legendary swordsman, Yoon-kang himself is a highly skilled swordsman but went through life with little ambition or direction, which his father often admonished him for. After Jin-han is killed by conspirators then falsely branded a traitor, his children are also punished. The girl Yoon-kang loves, Soo-in, helps him escape arrest, but while on a boat he is shot, falls into the water, and is presumed dead. Fortunately, Yoon-kang is rescued by a group of men heading to Japan, and three years later, he returns to Joseon under the assumed name Hasegawa Hanjo to embark on his revenge mission and has traded his sword for a rifle.

- Nam Sang-mi as Jung Soo-in

Soo-in is a feisty and intelligent noblewoman, despite her sheltered upbringing. Though she retains her wonder at modern gadgets such as the camera, Soo-in's heartbreak over Yoon-kang's "death" has made her jaded at the seeming pointlessness of changing the world for the better. But upon meeting Hasegawa Hanjo, she instantly recognizes him as Yoon-kang despite his repeated denials. Through the twists of fate that follow, Soo-in develops into a strong, tough modern woman.

- Jeon Hye-bin as Choi Hye-won

A cold-hearted, unapproachable merchant's daughter. Hye-won desires to acquire enough wealth to hold the world in her hand, but things change when she inconveniently falls for the Japanese trader Hasegawa Hanjo, who unbeknownst to her is Yoon-kang, her father's enemy. As a child, she was a slave who was raped by her master and beaten by her mistress.

- Han Joo-wan as Kim Ho-kyung

He leads a lonely existence due to his status as the illegitimate son of Minister Kim Byung-je. Thus, Ho-kyung dreams of revolution and a new world after being influenced by Kaehwa-aligned politicians and scholars. Ho-kyung is close to the Jung family, who treat him as a beloved son, but the feelings he harbors for Soo-in are romantic rather than brotherly.

- Yu Oh-seong as Choi Won-shin

A merchant and assassin with an expressionless face and a heart full of ambition which was driven by a past of being humiliated by those in higher ranks. He is involved in a conspiracy against the king, picking off the latter's allies one by one with his rifle. Won-shin is also Hye-won's father and his daughter's enslavement is a source of his hatred for the ruling elite class. Due to this, he wants power more than anything else since only then could he keep himself and his daughter safe and saw money as the future and thus became a businessman.
Somewhere in the past, he had to make a deal which allowed him and his daughter to be free of slavery, but in return, he became a hunting dog.

=== Supporting ===
- Choi Jae-sung as Park Jin-han

A stern but principled man, he is Yoon-kang and Yeon-ha's father. As head of the king's royal guard, his job includes tracking down those plotting to interfere with the king's reforms. However, his loyalty to the king and dedication to his job has put his family in the cross hairs of the very people he tracks down.

- Kim Hyun-soo as Park Yeon-ha

Yoon-kang's younger sister. Upon the court's orders, she becomes a slave after her father is posthumously branded a traitor. Though she's saved before anything major happening by her brother.

- Choi Cheol-ho as Moon Il-do

Park Jin-han's second-in-command. Three years after Jin-han's death, Emperor Gojong orders him to secretly reopen the gunman case. He remained loyal to the Park family all these years and steadfastly believed in his former superior's innocence.

- Lee Dong-hwi as Han Jung-hoon

A clumsy timid and quite greedy police officer serving under Il-do and also Yoon-kang's best friend. He realizes Hanjo's real identity as Yoon-kang and agrees to secretly help his friend.

- Choi Ji-na as Park Jin-han's wife

When Yoon-kang was a young boy and Yeon-ha a baby, their mother was kidnapped and used as bait by a group of bandits her husband was after. She sacrificed herself to prevent them from searching their house for the children. For many years Yoon-kang blamed his father Park Jin-han for not complying with the ransom demand to stop advancing his troops in order to spare his wife's life, believing that was the reason she was killed.

- Um Hyo-sup as Jung Hwe-ryung

The official state interpreter, and Soo-in's father. He and Park Jin-han became friends after the latter saved his life during one of his travels, so Hwe-ryung welcomes Jin-han's children into his household to hide them from their father's enemies.

- Kim Ye-ryeong as Lady Kim

Jung Hwe-ryung's wife and Soo-in's mother. She worries that her daughter has disconnected herself from the world since Yoon-kang's death.

- Ahn Ji-hyun as Jan-yi

Soo-in's loyal maid.

- Nam Myung-ryul as Hyun Am

Leader of the Kaehwa faction, who is assassinated while giving a speech to his followers. Among his pupils were Soo-in and Ho-kyung. Hyun Am wrote a book of his teachings and left it in Soo-in's keeping before his death.

- Kim Jung-hak as Oh Kyung

The last living Kaehwa scholar who becomes the assassins' next target.

- Choi Jong-won as Kim Jwa-young

Nobleman who is the head of the powerful Andong Kim clan. He is Gojong's most powerful political opposition and is the leader of the conservative Sugu faction.

- Ahn Suk-hwan as Kim Byung-je

One of the top state councilors in Gojong's court. He is a member of the Sugu faction.

- Lee Min-woo as Emperor Gojong
- Ha Ji-eun as Queen Min
- Choi Jae-hwan as Sang-chu / Sato

Hanjo's loyal Joseon-born interpreter and servant. He chooses to remain with Hanjo despite being allowed to leave.

- Ryohei Otani as Ganemaru

A Japanese man who is part of Hanjo's entourage, but doesn't know his real identity.

- Yoon Hee-seok as Kim Ok-gyun

The man who rescued Yoon-kang from near death and took him to Japan. He is a Kaehwa scholar.

- Jin Sung as Sung-gil

One of Won-shin's assassins.

- Kang Sung-jin as Kim Moo-deok

One of Won-shin's assassins.

- Park Jae-min as Jong-tae

Traveling peddler turned assassin.

- Jung Geun as Son Taek-soo

Won-shin's mole in the police force who was bribed to give false testimony that Jin-han was a traitor.

- Kim Ga-eun as Im Je-mi

A slave girl who enters Hanjo's employ and teaches Ganemaru the Korean language.

- Kim Eung-soo as Yamamoto Shinji

An influential Japanese merchant who has ties with the Japanese government.

- Song Ji-ho as Nakamura
- Seo Dong-won as Gunpowder technician

== Production ==
Lee Joon-gi, Nam Sang-mi and Choi Jae-sung previously starred together in Time Between Dog and Wolf (2007).

Filming locations included Andong, Buan, Gochang, Mungyeong, Yeongju, Masan, and Sokcho.

All of the guns in the drama are props, and are just used to fire blanks. Ryu Young Jae, who is in charge of special effects said, "Use of real firearms in movies and broadcasts is prohibited in South Korea. The guns have been borrowed from Hong Kong".

== Original soundtrack ==
Gunman in Joseon: Original Sound Track

Soundtrack album by Various Artists
- Released: September 3, 2014
- Genres: Pop, K-pop, soundtrack
- Labels: A&G Modes; AGMK-10016

Disc 1:
No.	Title	Artist	Length
1.	"달픈" (Aching)	Bubble Sisters	3:54
2.	"돌 틈 꽃" (A Flower in the Rock)	ALi	4:32
3.	"아파도 그대죠" (Though It Hurts, It's You)	Misty	4:17
4.	"기다리라 해요" (Try to Wait)	Im Chang-jung	4:15
5.	"내 맘을 아나요" (Do You Know My Heart?)	Ivy	3:33
6.	"무한지애 (無限之愛)" (Infinite Love)	Jo Jang-hyuk	4:25
7.	"눈물을 닮아" (Resembling Tears)	The Ray	4:10
8.	"언제쯤 그칠까요" (When Will It End?)	Yang Sun-mi	4:04
9.	"행복합니다" (Happiness)	Timber	4:36

Disc 2:
No.	Title	Artist	Length
1.	"義 - 흑랑 (黑狼)"	Various Artists
2.	"雄 - Hero (Title)"	Various Artists
3.	"鬪 - 혈투 (血鬪)"	Various Artists
4.	"命 - Croce"	Various Artists
5.	"慈 - Salvami l'anima Mia"	Various Artists
6.	"心 - 그대 머무는 곳에"	Various Artists
7.	"連 - 다홍치마"	Various Artists
8.	"相 - 동동 (動動)"	Various Artists
9.	"安 - 태평가 (太平歌)"	Various Artists
10.	"哀 - 이 비가 그치면"	Various Artists
11.	"殘 - 붉은 달 (赤月)"	Various Artists
12.	"覺 - 폭풍 속으로"	Various Artists
13.	"忍 - 바람이라면"	Various Artists
14.	"孤 - 이제 어디로"	Various Artists
15.	"憬 - 단 하루만"	Various Artists
16.	"希 - 희망가 (希望歌)"	Various Artists

== Ratings ==
Episode #	Original broadcast date	Average audience share			
Episode #	Original broadcast date	TNmS Ratings		AGB Nielsen	
Episode #	Original broadcast date	Nationwide	Seoul National Capital Area	Nationwide	Seoul National Capital Area
1	25 June 2014	8.9%	9.1%	8.4%	8.8%
2	26 June 2014	6.6%	8.2%	8.0%	8.6%
3	2 July 2014	8.3%	8.6%	8.0%	8.3%
4	3 July 2014	8.0%	8.7%	8.7%	9.4%
5	9 July 2014	8.5%	8.7%	9.9%	9.6%
6	10 July 2014	8.9%	9.9%	10.5%	10.6%
7	16 July 2014	8.3%	8.8%	10.2%	11.1%
8	17 July 2014	8.3%	8.8%	10.6%	12.1%
9	23 July 2014	9.3%	10.3%	11.6%	12.4%
10	24 July 2014	10.7%	11.7%	11.9%	12.2%
11	30 July 2014	9.5%	10.6%	11.2%	12.1%
12	31 July 2014	9.4%	11.2%	11.7%	12.8%
13	6 August 2014	9.9%	10.3%	10.5%	11.5%
14	7 August 2014	9.6%	10.3%	12.2%	13.1%
15	13 August 2014	10.1%	10.6%	11.1%	11.3%
16	14 August 2014	10.0%	10.4%	11.0%	10.7%
17	20 August 2014	9.4%	9.4%	11.1%	11.4%
18	21 August 2014	10.0%	10.7%	11.7%	11.9%
19	27 August 2014	8.8%	9.8%	10.8%	11.7%
20	28 August 2014	9.0%	9.4%	11.5%	12.5%
21	3 September 2014	9.1%	9.2%	11.8%	12.0%
22	4 September 2014	9.8%	10.5%	12.8%	13.0%
Average		9.1%	9.8%	10.7%	11.2%

== Awards and nominations ==
Year	Award	Category	Recipient	Result
2014	KBS Drama Awards	Top Excellence Award, Actor	Lee Joon-gi	Nominated
2014	KBS Drama Awards	Top Excellence Award, Actress	Nam Sang-mi	Nominated
2014	KBS Drama Awards	Excellence Award, Actor in a Mid-length Drama	Lee Joon-gi	Won
2014	KBS Drama Awards	Excellence Award, Actress in a Mid-length Drama	Nam Sang-mi	Won
2014	KBS Drama Awards	Best Supporting Actor	Yu Oh-seong	Nominated
2014	KBS Drama Awards	Best Supporting Actress	Jeon Hye-bin	Nominated
2014	KBS Drama Awards	Best New Actress	Kim Ga-eun	Nominated
2014	KBS Drama Awards	Best Young Actress	Kim Hyun-soo	Nominated
2014	KBS Drama Awards	Best Couple Award	Lee Joon-gi and Nam Sang-mi	Won
2015	48th WorldFest-Houston International Film Festival	Gold Remi for TV Miniseries	Gunman in Joseon	Won
2015	10th Seoul International Drama Awards	Outstanding Korean Drama	Gunman in Joseon	Won
2015	10th Seoul International Drama Awards	Outstanding Korean Actor	Lee Joon-gi	Won

== International broadcast ==
Country	Network	Airing dates
Thailand	PPTV HD	June 21, 2015 – September 26, 2015
Thailand	Channel 9 MCOT HD	July 3, 2017 - on air
Myanmar	MRTV	2015
Vietnam	HTV2	September 4, 2015
Hong Kong	ViuTV	August 14, 2016 – October 23, 2016 (Sunday 12:30 – 15:00 (two consecutive episodes))

== See also ==
- Kapsin Coup
