= Anystar =

Promotional single by Lee Hyori
- Released: December 26, 2006
- Recorded: 2006
- Genre: K-pop
- Length: 3:48
- Label: BCS Korea
- Songwriters: Park Geun-tae; Lee Joon-gi
- Producer: Park Geun-tae

Lee Hyori singles chronology
"Straight Up" (2006)	"Anystar" (2006)	"Toc Toc Toc" (2007)

"Anystar" is a song by South Korean recording artist Lee Hyori, featuring singer and actor Lee Joon-gi. It is Lee's third installment of her Samsung Anycall promotional campaign, with the first two singles being "Anymotion" featuring Shinhwa's Eric Mun (2005) and "Anyclub" featuring Teddy Park (2005).

== Background ==
"Anystar" is Lee Hyori's third promotional single for Samsung's Anycall mobile phone brand; the first single "Anymotion" was released on February 24, 2005, while the second single "Anyclub" was released on October 26, 2005. All three singles were composed by Park Geun-tae, while the rap lyrics of "Anystar" were penned by Lee Joon-gi.

== Music video and promotion ==
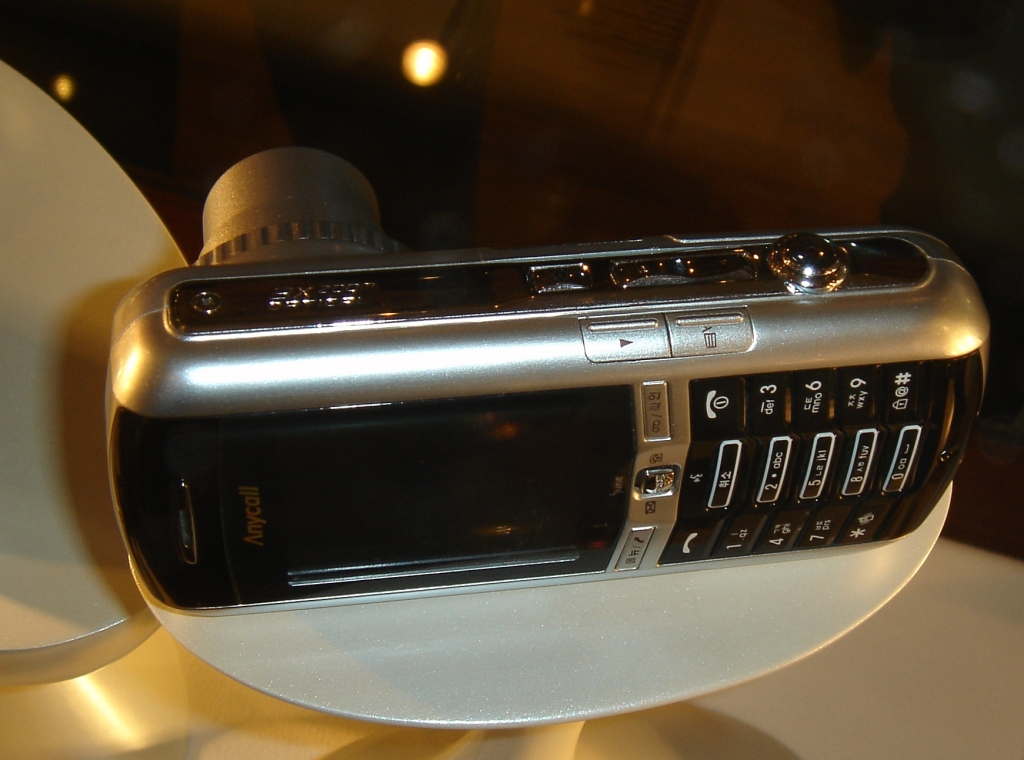
A Samsung Anycall phone

The music video for "Anystar" featured appearances from Lee Joon-gi and Park Bom of 2NE1. Lee held an "Anystar" showcase on December 20, 2006.

== Track listing ==
- Digital download / streaming
1. "Anystar" – 3:48

== Release history ==
Country	Date	Label	Format
Various	December 26, 2006	BCS Korea	Digital download
