= Love in Sadness =

2019 South Korean television series

- Promotional poster
- Hangul: 슬플 때 사랑한다
- Lit.: I Love You When I'm Sad
- RR: Seulpeul ttae saranghanda
- MR: Sŭlp'ŭl ttae saranghanda
- Genre: Melodrama; Romantic thriller
- Based on: Beauty by Shinji Nojima
- Developed by: Kim Seung-mo
- Written by: Song Jung-rim
- Directed by: Choi Yi-sub; Yoo Beom-sang
- Starring: Ji Hyun-woo; Park Han-byul; Ryu Soo-young; Park Ha-na; Wang Bit-na
- Composer: Lee Se-woo
- Country of origin: South Korea
- Original language: Korean
- No. of episodes: 40 (Note: In order to circumvent Korean laws that prevent commercial breaks in the middle of an episode, what would previously have been aired as single 70 minute episodes are now being repackaged as two 35 minute episodes, with two episodes being shown each night with a commercial break between the two.)

Production
- Producers: Kim Dong-gu; Choi Jin-ho
- Running time: 35 minutes
- Production companies: DK E&M; Hello Contents by SH Entertainment Group

Original release
- Network: MBC TV
- Release: February 23 – April 27, 2019

Love in Sadness (Korean: 슬플 때 사랑한다) is a 2019 South Korean television series starring Ji Hyun-woo, Park Han-byul, Ryu Soo-young and Wang Bit-na. It is a remake of the 1999 TBS drama Beauty (a/k/a Le Bel Homme and Beautiful Person). The series aired four episodes every Saturday on MBC TV from February 23 to April 27, 2019.

== Synopsis ==
Yoon Ma-ri (Park Ha-na/Park Han-byul) is in an unhappy marriage with Kang In-wook (Ryu Soo-young), an abusive, and obsessively possessive husband who is also of a chaebol family. She meets Seo Jung-won (Ji Hyun-woo), a kind-hearted plastic surgeon. After seeing the abuse she receives, Seo Jung-won operates on her face to help her start a new life with a new identity after which she develops feelings for the surgeon, and he for her.

== Cast ==
=== Main ===
- Ji Hyun-woo as Seo Jung-won (37 years old)
- Park Han-byul as Yoon Ma-ri (37 years old)
- Ryu Soo-young as Kang In-wook (38 years old)
- Wang Bit-na as Joo Hae-ra (37 years old)

=== Supporting ===
==== People around Jung-won ====
- Moon Hee-kyung as Lim Yeon-hwa (64 years old)

Jung-won's mother. She used to be a doctor.

==== Seo & Ha Plastic Surgery ====
- Go Joo-won as Ha Seong-ho (37 years old)

Director of Seo & Ha Plastic Surgery. Jung-won's friend and rival.

- Hwang Jung-in as Park Na-yeon (28 years old)

She's a nurse.

- Park Sang-shin as Kim Bong-woo (34 years old)

He's an anesthesiologist.

==== People around Ma-ri ====
- Kim Yeong-ryeong as Lee Kyung-hee (60 years old)

Ma-ri's mother.

- Kim Yun-joo as Choi Woo-sun (32 years old)

Mari's friend. She works at an Art Academy.

==== People around In-wook ====
- Jeong Won-jung as Gang Il-guk (66 years old)

In-wook's father. He's the president of Geonha Group.

- Kook Jung-sook as Moon Hye-sook (52 years old)

In-wook's stepmother.

- Jung Sung-hoon as Kang In-sang (17 years old)

In-wook's half-brother.

- Kang Sung-wook as Kim Secretary (29 years old)

In-wook's secretary.

- Go Woo-ri (Note: Credited as Go Na-eun) as Oh Cheol-young (32 years old)

Former detective employed by In-wook.

==== People around Hae-ra ====
- Heo Eun-jeong as Eun Jung (22 years old)

She works at the Gyeong Gallery.

=== Special appearances ===
- Park Ha-na as former Yoon Ma-ri
- Kim Beop-rae as Divorce Lawyer (Ep.36)

== Production ==
- The series is written by Song Jung-rim (Miss Ajumma, Secrets of Women) and directed by Choi Yi-sub (Miss Ripley, Working Mom Parenting Daddy) and Yoo Beom-sang.
- The first script reading took place in late November 2018 at MBC Broadcasting Station in Sangam, South Korea.

=== Comparisons with Let Me Introduce Her ===
Ahead of its premiere, netizens were comparing Love in Sadness with the 2018 SBS TV weekend drama Let Me Introduce Her.

== Ratings ==
- In this table, the blue numbers represent the lowest ratings and the red numbers represent the highest ratings.
- N/A denotes that the rating is not known.

Ep.	Original broadcast date	Title	Average audience share		
Ep.	Original broadcast date	Title	AGB Nielsen		TNmS
Ep.	Original broadcast date	Title	Nationwide	Seoul	Nationwide
1	February 23, 2019	Tomorrow, I Die (나는 내일 죽습니다)	9.7% (10th)	8.9% (13th)	11.0%
2	February 23, 2019	Tomorrow, I Die (나는 내일 죽습니다)	10.5% (7th)	9.8% (9th)	12.3%
3	February 23, 2019	You Are My Hope (당신은 나의 희망입니다)	9.7% (10th)	9.7% (11th)	10.5%
4	February 23, 2019	You Are My Hope (당신은 나의 희망입니다)	9.9% (9th)	9.8% (9th)	10.6%
5	March 2, 2019	You Make Me Live Again (당신은 나를 다시 살아나게 해요)	11.1% (8th)	10.4% (8th)	10.9%
6	March 2, 2019	You Make Me Live Again (당신은 나를 다시 살아나게 해요)	13.0% (5th)	12.2% (7th)	12.7%
7	March 2, 2019	Tell Me (나에게 말해주세요)	10.3% (11th)	9.5% (11th)	10.4%
8	March 2, 2019	Tell Me (나에게 말해주세요)	10.9% (9th)	9.9% (9th)	11.1%
9	March 9, 2019	Fear Comes To Me (두려움이 나를 찾아와)	12.0% (6th)	11.2% (7th)	11.1%
10	March 9, 2019	Fear Comes To Me (두려움이 나를 찾아와)	13.0% (4th)	11.9% (6th)	11.9%
11	March 9, 2019	If You Stay With Me (당신이 곁에 있어준다면)	11.4% (8th)	10.6% (10th)	10.0%
12	March 9, 2019	If You Stay With Me (당신이 곁에 있어준다면)	11.5% (7th)	10.8% (9th)	10.3%
13	March 16, 2019	I Am Lucky To Have Met You (당신을 만난 건 행운입니다)	10.5% (7th)	9.5% (9th)	10.0%
14	March 16, 2019	I Am Lucky To Have Met You (당신을 만난 건 행운입니다)	11.3% (6th)	10.3% (7th)	11.2%
15	March 16, 2019	Your Love Remains In My Heart (당신의 사랑이 나의 마음에 머물러)	9.4% (11th)	9.0% (12th)	8.9%
16	March 16, 2019	Your Love Remains In My Heart (당신의 사랑이 나의 마음에 머물러)	9.6% (10th)	9.1% (11th)	9.1%
17	March 23, 2019	I Got Caught By The Magic Of Love (사랑의 마법에 걸렸어요)	9.9% (8th)	9.5% (10th)	9.7%
18	March 23, 2019	I Got Caught By The Magic Of Love (사랑의 마법에 걸렸어요)	10.9% (7th)	10.7% (7th)	10.5%
19	March 23, 2019	I Am Happy To Be In Your Heart (당신의 마음을 알게 되어 기쁩니다)	9.1% (13th)	9.1% (13th)	8.5%
20	March 23, 2019	I Am Happy To Be In Your Heart (당신의 마음을 알게 되어 기쁩니다)	9.6% (9th)	9.2% (12th)	8.8%
21	March 30, 2019	Can I Confess It, My Love (고백해도 될까요, 내 사랑을)	8.8% (12th)	8.0% (14th)	9.0%
22	March 30, 2019	Can I Confess It, My Love (고백해도 될까요, 내 사랑을)	10.4% (6th)	9.7% (8th)	10.4%
23	March 30, 2019	When Endless Sadness Sings In My Heart (끝없는 슬픔이 내 마음을 적실 때)	8.1% (15th)	7.6% (16th)	8.5%
24	March 30, 2019	When Endless Sadness Sings In My Heart (끝없는 슬픔이 내 마음을 적실 때)	8.2% (14th)	7.7% (15th)	9.0%
25	April 6, 2019	If You Are Allowed To Love Again (허락된다면 사랑을 다시 한번)	8.0% (14th)	7.6% (15th)	7.8%
26	April 6, 2019	If You Are Allowed To Love Again (허락된다면 사랑을 다시 한번)	9.7% (6th)	9.0% (7th)	9.9%
27	April 6, 2019	Hello, Thank You For That (안녕, 그동안 고마웠어요)	8.2% (12th)	8.0% (10th)	8.3%
28	April 6, 2019	Hello, Thank You For That (안녕, 그동안 고마웠어요)	8.5% (8th)	8.3% (9th)	8.4%
29	April 13, 2019	I Want To Shake Off My Anxiety (나의 불안을 떨쳐주세요)	7.5% (15th)	6.8% (15th)	—N/a
30	April 13, 2019	I Want To Shake Off My Anxiety (나의 불안을 떨쳐주세요)	9.0% (6th)	8.3% (8th)	—N/a
31	April 13, 2019	A Love That I Cannot Have (이루어 질 수 없는 사랑)	7.8% (9th)	7.0% (14th)	—N/a
32	April 13, 2019	A Love That I Cannot Have (이루어 질 수 없는 사랑)	7.8% (9th)	7.1% (12th)	—N/a
33	April 20, 2019	Do Not Give In To Adversity (역경에 굴하지 않는다)	6.6% (18th)	—N/a	8.2%
34	April 20, 2019	Do Not Give In To Adversity (역경에 굴하지 않는다)	9.0% (7th)	8.6% (7th)	10.3%
35	April 20, 2019	I Will Tell You (당신에게 소식을 전합니다)	7.9% (11th)	7.0% (14th)	8.7%
36	April 20, 2019	I Will Tell You (당신에게 소식을 전합니다)	8.6% (8th)	7.7% (11th)	8.7%
37	April 27, 2019	Nothing Will Change Even If I Die (죽어도 변함이 없습니다)	9.3% (7th)		9.4%
38	April 27, 2019	Nothing Will Change Even If I Die (죽어도 변함이 없습니다)	10.7% (5th)	10.2% (5th)	11.2%
39	April 27, 2019	Even When You Are Sad, I Love You (당신이 슬플 때에도, 나는 당신을 사랑합니다)	10.1% (6th)	9.3% (7th)	10.6%
40	April 27, 2019	Even When You Are Sad, I Love You (당신이 슬플 때에도, 나는 당신을 사랑합니다)	10.8% (3rd)	10.3% (3rd)	11.4%
Average			9.71%	— (Note: Due to some ratings not recorded, the exact average rating is unknown.)	—
