= Let Me Introduce Her =

2018 South Korean television series

- Promotional poster
- Hangul: 그녀로 말할 것 같으면
- RR: Geunyeoro malhal geot gateumyeon
- MR: Kŭnyŏro marhal kŏt kat'ŭmyŏn
- Genre: Mystery; Thriller; Romance
- Created by: Hong Chang-wook
- Written by: Park Un-hee
- Directed by: Park Gyung-ryeol
- Starring: Nam Sang-mi; Kim Jae-won; Jo Hyun-jae
- Country of origin: South Korea
- Original language: Korean
- No. of episodes: 40 (Note: In order to circumvent Korean laws that prevent commercial breaks in the middle of an episode, what would previously have been aired as single 70 minute episodes are now being repackaged as two 35 minute episodes, with two episodes being shown each night with a commercial break between the two.)

Production
- Executive producers: Kim Hyun-jung; Kim Yong-jin
- Producer: Park Ji-eun
- Running time: 35 minutes
- Production companies: SBS Plus; Shinyoung E&C Group

Original release
- Network: SBS TV
- Release: July 14 – September 29, 2018

Let Me Introduce Her (Korean: 그녀로 말할 것 같으면) is a South Korean television series starring Nam Sang-mi, Kim Jae-won, and Jo Hyun-jae. The series aired four consecutive episodes on Saturday on SBS TV from July 14 to September 29, 2018.

== Synopsis ==
The story of Ji Eun-han who loses her memory after undergoing plastic surgery to assume another identity, and searches for memories to find out who she was.

== Cast ==
=== Main ===
- Nam Sang-mi as Ji Eun-han

A woman who loses her memory after a plastic surgery.

- Kim Jaewon as Han Kang-woo

Ji Eun-han's plastic surgeon.

- Jo Hyun-jae as Kang Chan-ki

A news anchorman and Ji Eun-han's husband.

=== Recurring ===
- Lee Mi-sook as Min Ja-young
- Han Eun-jung as Jung Soo-jin
- Yang Jin-sung as Song Chae-young
- Lee Dae-yeon as Han Young-cheol
- Kim Roi-ha as Detective Kim
- Kim Jung-young as Lee Sook-hyun
- Jung Young-joo as Madame Hwang
- Jeong Jin-woon as Han Hee-young
- Lee Ho-jung as Lee Hyun-soo
- Kim Bo-kang as Jang Seok-joon
- Kang Hoon as Ji Soo-han
- Lee Si-a as Ji Eun-han
- Kim Jung-young as Ji Eun-han's mother.

== Production ==
The first script reading took place on May 22, 2018 at SBS Prism Tower in Sangam-dong, Seoul, South Korea.

Let Me Introduce Her was the last drama series executive produced by Kim Yong-jin for SBS Plus before he became the vice-president and head of scripted programming of Kakao M's television production subsidiary Mega Monster the same year. (His first project with Mega Monster (as showrunner/executive producer), the mystery-thriller miniseries Children of Nobody, premiered on rival network MBC TV almost two months after Let Me Introduce Her aired its last episode.)

== Plagiarism controversy ==
In September 2018, South Korean production company DK E&M (CEO Kim Dong-gu), the company behind the dramas Blow Breeze, Working Mom Parenting Daddy and Here Comes Mr. Oh, announced an intention to file a plagiarism lawsuit against SBS, its subsidiary SBS Plus and Shinyoung E&C Group, accusing Let Me Introduce Her of "plagiarizing" the 1999 Japanese drama Beautiful Person. DK E&M has been in talks with TBS (the original network of Beautiful Person) since November 2017 to produce a Korean drama adaptation of it, and was planning to broadcast the series in 2019 but that was affected, allegedly because SBS aired Let Me Introduce Her first.

SBS has since denied the accusation, stating that "only the themes of plastic surgery and romance are similar" in the two dramas. It also plans to file a defamation suit against DK E&M for the latter's "baseless" claims.

On October 8, 2018, DK E&M sought help from the Korean Television and Radio Writers Association regarding the controversy, saying that "the attitude of SBS regarding the situation was disappointing".

== Original soundtrack ==
=== Part 1 ===
Released on July 14, 2018
No.	Title	Lyrics	Artist	Length
1.	"기억을 걸어" (Snowball)	Kim Ho-kyung (김호경)	JK Kim Dong-wook (JK 김동욱)	4:01
2.	"기억을 걸어" (Inst.)			4:01
Total length:				8:02

=== Part 2 ===
Released on July 28, 2018
No.	Title	Lyrics	Artist	Length
1.	"Save Me"	Lee Shin-sung (이신성)	leeSA (리싸)	3:50
2.	"Save Me" (Inst.)			3:50
Total length:				7:40

=== Part 3 ===
Released on August 4, 2018
No.	Title	Lyrics	Artist	Length
1.	"This Love" (이 사랑)	Kang Eden (강이든)	Jinsol (April) (진솔 (에이프릴))	4:41
2.	"This Love" (Inst.)			4:41
Total length:				9:22

=== Part 4 ===
Released on August 18, 2018
No.	Title	Lyrics	Artist	Length
1.	"Even If You Hate It" (미워해봐도)	Seo Jae-ha (서재하), Kim Young-sung (김영성)	Navi (나비)	3:27
2.	"Even If You Hate It" (Inst.)			3:27
Total length:				6:54

=== Part 5 ===
Released on August 25, 2018
No.	Title	Lyrics	Artist	Length
1.	"Wait A Minute"	Yoo Song-yeon (유송연), Jay Lee	Cha Yeoul (차여울)	3:16
2.	"Wait A Minute" (Inst.)			3:16
Total length:				6:32

== Ratings ==
- In the table below, the blue numbers represent the lowest ratings and the red numbers represent the highest ratings.
- NR denotes that the drama did not rank in the top 20 daily programs on that date.
- N/A denotes that the rating is not known.

Ep.	Original broadcast date	Average audience share			
Ep.	Original broadcast date	TNmS		AGB Nielsen	
Ep.	Original broadcast date	Nationwide	Seoul	Nationwide	Seoul
1	July 14, 2018	4.0%	4.2%	4.4% (NR)	4.6% (NR)
2	July 14, 2018	4.9%	5.1%	5.3% (NR)	5.5% (NR)
3	July 14, 2018	5.4%	5.6%	5.8% (NR)	6.0% (NR)
4	July 14, 2018	6.6%	6.7%	7.1% (14th)	7.2% (13th)
5	July 21, 2018	3.5%	3.7%	3.9% (NR)	4.1% (NR)
6	July 21, 2018	5.4%	5.5%	5.8% (19th)	5.8% (20th)
7	July 21, 2018	5.1%	5.3%	5.5% (NR)	5.7% (NR)
8	July 21, 2018	6.5%	7.1%	7.2% (13th)	7.8% (10th)
9	July 28, 2018	5.2%	5.4%	4.8% (NR)	5.0% (NR)
10	July 28, 2018	6.8%	7.3%	5.9% (NR)	6.4% (NR)
11	July 28, 2018	7.2%	7.8%	6.4% (19th)	7.0% (17th)
12	July 28, 2018	8.9%	9.6%	8.3% (7th)	9.0% (6th)
13	August 4, 2018	4.8%	5.0%	5.3% (NR)	5.5% (NR)
14	August 4, 2018	5.4%	6.1%	6.6% (15th)	7.3% (13th)
15	August 4, 2018	5.8%	6.3%	7.1% (13th)	7.6% (12th)
16	August 4, 2018	7.0%	7.6%	8.4% (4th)	9.0% (4th)
17	August 11, 2018	6.0%	6.4%	6.6% (17th)	6.9% (15th)
18	August 11, 2018	8.3%	9.0%	8.7% (6th)	9.4% (6th)
19	August 11, 2018	8.5%	9.1%	9.3% (4th)	9.9% (4th)
20	August 11, 2018	10.5%	10.8%	11.9% (2nd)	12.3% (2nd)
21	August 18, 2018	5.9%	6.4%	6.3% (15th)	6.8% (12th)
22	August 18, 2018	7.8%	7.9%	8.6% (8th)	8.7% (7th)
23	August 18, 2018	8.5%	8.6%	9.1% (5th)	9.1% (6th)
24	August 18, 2018	10.2%	10.4%	11.8% (2nd)	12.0% (2nd)
25	August 25, 2018	5.3%	5.8%	5.7% (19th)	6.1% (17th)
26	August 25, 2018	7.5%	7.7%	8.4% (8th)	8.6% (8th)
27	August 25, 2018	7.6%	8.3%	8.7% (7th)	9.4% (7th)
28	August 25, 2018	9.2%	10.1%	10.4% (3rd)	11.3% (2nd)
29	September 8, 2018 (Note: No episodes aired on September 1 due to coverage of the 2018 Asian Games in Jakarta and Palembang.)	—N/a		6.9% (13th)	7.4% (10th)
30	September 8, 2018	—N/a		8.7% (4th)	8.5% (7th)
31	September 8, 2018	—N/a		8.5% (6th)	9.2% (4th)
32	September 8, 2018	—N/a		9.8% (2nd)	9.7% (2nd)
33	September 15, 2018	—N/a		7.0% (17th)	7.5% (16th)
34	September 15, 2018	—N/a		8.8% (8th)	9.4% (7th)
35	September 15, 2018	—N/a		10.1% (4th)	10.7% (4th)
36	September 15, 2018	—N/a		12.0% (3rd)	12.3% (3rd)
37	September 29, 2018 (Note: No episodes aired on September 22 due to the broadcast of the film Little Forest.)	—N/a		8.0% (12th)	8.8% (8th)
38	September 29, 2018	—N/a		9.6% (5th)	10.3% (5th)
39	September 29, 2018	—N/a		10.4% (2nd)	11.1% (4th)
40	September 29, 2018	—N/a		12.7% (3rd)	13.6% (3rd)
Average		–	–	7.9%	8.3%

== Awards and nominations ==
Year	Award	Category	Recipient	Result	Ref.
2018	6th APAN Star Awards	Excellence Award, Actor in a Serial Drama	Jo Hyun-jae	Nominated	
2018	6th APAN Star Awards	Excellence Award, Actress in a Serial Drama	Nam Sang-mi	Nominated	
2018	SBS Drama Awards	Top Excellence Award, Actor in a Daily and Weekend Drama	Kim Jaewon	Won	
2018	SBS Drama Awards	Top Excellence Award, Actress in a Daily and Weekend Drama	Nam Sang-mi	Nominated	
2018	SBS Drama Awards	Top Excellence Award, Actress in a Daily and Weekend Drama	Han Eun-jung	Nominated	
2018	SBS Drama Awards	Producers' Award for Actress	Nam Sang-mi	Won	

== See also ==
- Love in Sadness, the official remake of Beautiful Person
