= Virgin Snow =

- Poster
- Hangul: 첫눈
- RR: Cheonnun
- MR: Ch'ŏnnun
- Directed by: Han Sang-hye
- Written by: Kazuhiko Ban
- Produced by: Jonathan Kim
- Starring: Lee Joon-gi; Aoi Miyazaki; Kimiko Yo; Otoha; Ayaka Morita; Shun Shioya; Miyu Yagyu
- Cinematography: Shigeru Ishihara
- Edited by: Kyung Min-ho
- Music by: Jeong Jae-hwan; Naotarō Moriyama (theme)
- Distributed by: CJ Entertainment
- Release dates: May 12, 2007 (Japan); November 1, 2007 (South Korea)
- Countries: South Korea; Japan
- Languages: Korean; Japanese; English
- Box office: $1,583,867

Virgin Snow (Korean: 첫눈; Japanese: 初雪の恋 ヴァージン・スノー, Hatsuyuki no koi) is a 2007 South Korean romance film directed by Han Sang-hye and starring Korean actor Lee Joon-gi, and Japanese actress Aoi Miyazaki.

== Plot ==
Min, a young Korean boy, moves to Japan with his father, who is a potter. One day at a local shrine, Min meets Nanae, a beautiful local girl and aspiring painter. He falls in love at first sight. She is a student at his new school, and their friendship develops despite their cultural and language differences. However, Min's grandmother suddenly falls ill, and Min returns to Korea without having a chance to explain to Nanae. While he is gone, Nanae is forced to move away to protect her and her sister from their mother's violent boyfriend. Before Min and Nanae separate, Nanae gives Min an amulet pouch with a letter inside. She tells him to open it later, and so he doesn't open it before he goes to see his grandmother. Min's grandmother notices it in his pocket and assumes that it is a present for her from Japan; not wanting to disappoint his grandmother, Min gives away the amulet pouch. When Min's grandmother eventually recovers, he returns to Japan only to find that Nanae is gone.

Two years later a friend of Min finds Nanae drawing in a park. Nanae explains the reason she disappeared, and learns that Min returned to Korea because he felt there was no reason to stay. A few months later Nanae and Min stumble upon each other at an art show in Korea. However, Min is still bruised from being left without news and reacts harshly at the reunion.

Later Min's grandmother discovers the letter inside the amulet pouch and gives it to him. The letter says that Nanae wants to be with Min forever but cannot because she has to go, but asks him to meet her at the first snow on Deoksugung street in Seoul. Min travels to Kyoto and finds diary entries from Nanae, saying that she has been waiting for him in vain there for several years. He leaves back to Seoul, but when at the airport in Seoul notices snowflakes starting to fall. He rushes to Deoksugung, and on a tree finds a paper note hoping that he will return (he tied the paper note there after he met with Nanae in Seoul). He turns to find Nanae and they tearfully reunite.

== Cast ==
- Lee Joon-gi as Kim-min
- Aoi Miyazaki as Sasaki Nanae
- Kimiko Yo
- Otoha
- Ayaka Morita
- Shun Shioya
- Miyu Yagyu
- Lee-hwan as Kim Da-hyeon

== Bibliography ==
- Hatsuyuki No Koi Official Site (in Japanese)
- Hatsuyuki no koi: Virgin snow at IMDb
- "First Snow (Cheonnun)(2007)". Korean Movie Database.
- Virgin Snow at HanCinema
