= Lee Joon-gi =

South Korean actor and singer (born 1982)

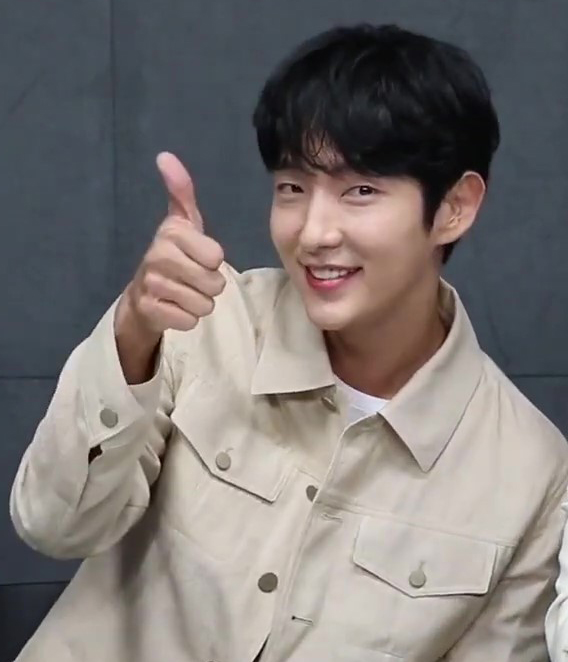
- Lee in 2022
- Born: 17 April 1982 (age 44); Busan, South Korea
- Education: Seoul Arts College
- Occupations: Actor; singer; dancer
- Years active: 2001–present
- Agent: Namoo Actors

Korean name
- Hangul: 이준기
- Hanja: 李準基
- RR: I Jungi
- MR: I Chun'gi
- Website: leejoongi.co.kr

Signature
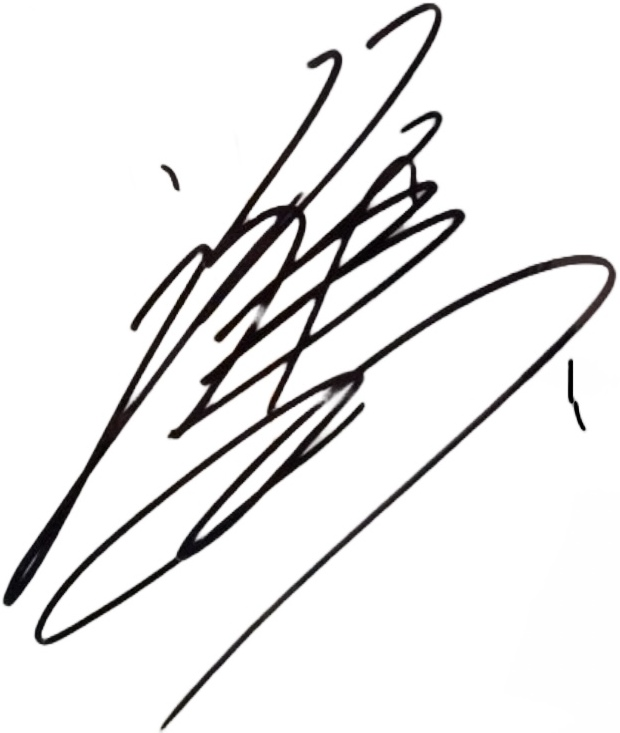

Lee Joon-gi (Korean: 이준기; born 17 April 1982) is a South Korean actor, singer, and dancer. He rose to fame on his first leading role playing a clown in the critically acclaimed film The King and the Clown (2005) and gained further recognition in the romantic comedy My Girl (2005−06). Since then, he has diversified into other genres such as historical dramas (sageuk) and action thrillers. He is also known for his roles in Iljimae (2008), Two Weeks (2013), Moon Lovers: Scarlet Heart Ryeo (2016), Lawless Lawyer (2018), and Flower of Evil (2020). The popularity of his work overseas, especially in Asia, have established him as a top Hallyu star.

== Early life and education ==
Lee Joon-gi was born in Daeyeon-dong, Nam District, Busan, South Korea but spent his schooling years in nearby Changwon. He first became interested in the performing arts as a high school student after watching a performance of Hamlet. After finishing high school, he went against his parents' wishes for him to enter university and moved to Seoul to pursue a career in the entertainment industry. For the next several years, Lee worked at various part-time jobs such as waiting tables while auditioning for roles and also debuted as a print and commercial model in 2001. He was accepted into the Seoul Arts College on a scholarship and graduated in 2007.

== Career ==
=== 2005: King and the Clown and rising fame ===
After bit-part roles in several dramas and films, Lee had his first major acting role in the 2005 film The King and the Clown, in which he played the historical figure Gong-gil, an effeminate clown in the Joseon period. The film, which achieved both critical and commercial success, propelled the then-unknown actor into Asia-wide stardom. Apart from winning numerous Best Newcomer recognition at the Korean Film Awards, Grand Bell Awards and Baeksang Art Awards, Lee also won the Best Actor Award at the Max Movie Awards.

Producer Lee Joon-ik revealed the story of how he chose Lee for The King and the Clown, despite being an unknown and relatively new actor, by just seeing him do handstands, saying, "Just because of handstands, Lee Joon-gi became the person he is today." After the film, Lee became "an icon" of the South Korean "pretty boy" trend. Lee has since tried to downplay this kkonminam image, saying that his character Gong-gil in the film felt like being in foot-irons so he wanted to escape from the image: "After my performance in The King and the Clown, I found myself at the forefront of this 'pretty boy' trend, whether or not that was my intention. Suddenly, people were interested in me, and there was all this praise and criticism all at the same time. Everything was just so overwhelming. I felt like I was floating on air."

Lee was against the halving of screen quotas in South Korea that allows foreign films to be shown in theaters on certain days, while domestic films are allotted another number of days. He believed that without the screen quotas, The King and the Clown would not have been as successful in competing against foreign films.

=== 2006–2007: Overseas popularity ===
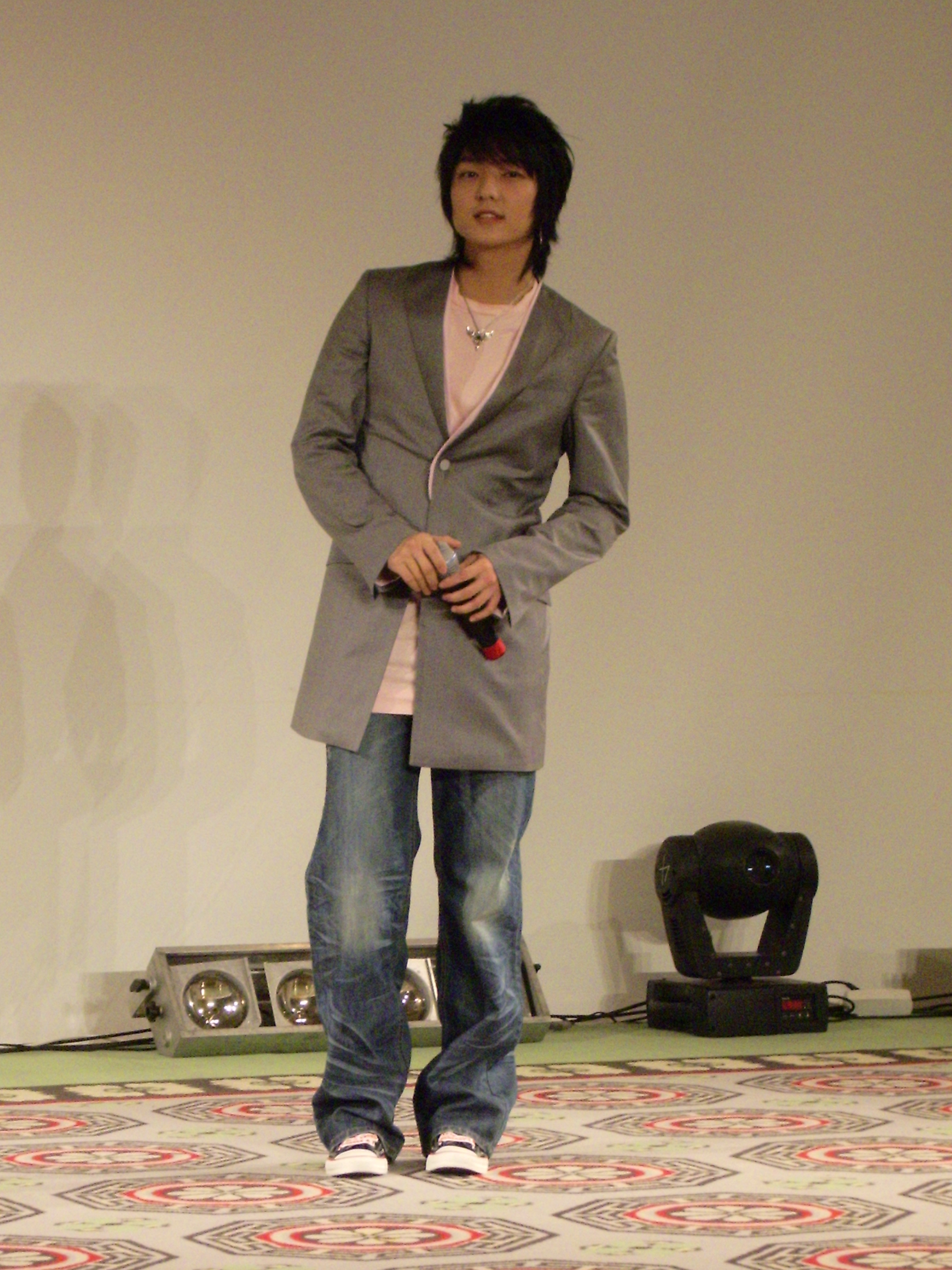
Lee at the King and the Clown fan meeting in January 2006

Lee was then cast as the second lead character in SBS's My Girl alongside Lee Da-hae and Lee Dong-wook. With an average viewership rating of 20%, the romance comedy series became a hit during its run both domestically and across Asia, further catapulting Lee into Korean Wave stardom. Due to the drama's popularity, the 'Lee Joon-gi Syndrome' occurred, establishing himself as a cultural icon of his time.

For his follow-up film Fly, Daddy, Fly, directed by Choi Jong-tae and produced by Dyne Film-Guardtec, he was reportedly paid ₩100 million, relatively low given his rising popularity following King and the Clown. This is because the contract was signed in early December before the film's release when Lee was an unknown actor. The film garnered much attention and media coverage among Chinese viewers.

In 2007, Lee filmed a joint Korea-Japan movie entitled Virgin Snow with Japanese actress Aoi Miyazaki, in which he plays a Korean exchange student. Virgin Snow was successful as it placed 9th at the box office chart and set a new ticket admissions record for a Korean film released in Japan. Lee later received the Rising Star Award at the 27th Hawaii International Film Festival. The same year, he participated in the film May 18, which is based on the events surrounding the Gwangju Massacre of 1980. 18 May achieved excellent box office results, and was later awarded the Gold Orchid Best Feature Film for the year of 2007. However, there was criticism that both of these productions, along with Fly, Daddy, Fly, had "either fallen short of expectations at the box office or cast Lee in minor roles."

Lee also took on his first drama leading role in MBC action drama, Time Between Dog and Wolf, as in which his character portrays a vengeful NIS agent with a violent streak, planning to infiltrate a drug gang to avenge the death of his mother. Prior from his previous work, the actor portrays variety of complexive emotions, successfully dispelling the 'pretty boy image' by showing off a manly short haircut in preparation for his role. With Lee Joon-Gi's notable performance, he successfully won the Excellence Award at the 2007 MBC Drama Awards. Director Kim Jin-min opined some years later that it was a turning point for Lee as the role enabled him to shed his "pretty boy" image and also highlight his martial arts background.

=== 2008–2009: Tourism ambassadorship and contractual dispute ===
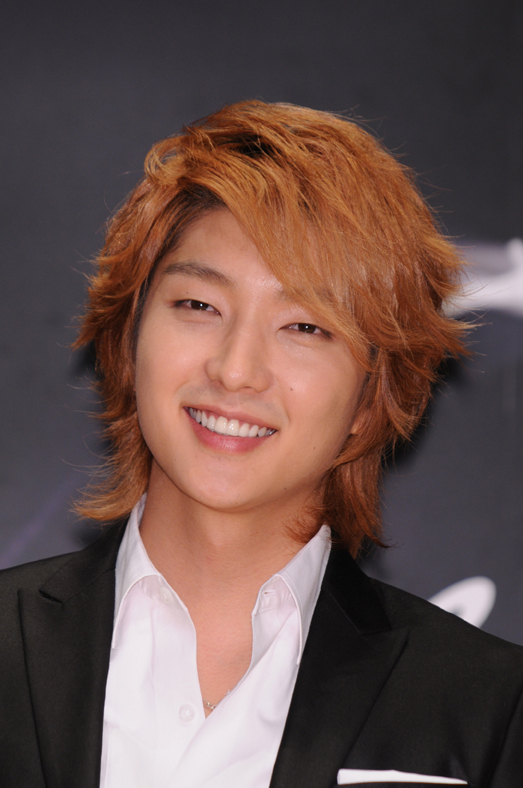
Lee at the Japan FM press conference in 2009

From April to July 2008, Lee played the titular role in SBS's Iljimae, a period-action drama based on Chinese folklore from the Ming dynasty about a masked Robin Hood-esque character during the Joseon era. The final episode achieved a rating of 31.4% viewership, and Lee later received the Top Excellence Award at the 2008 SBS Drama Awards. The drama was also aired in Japan on the channel TV Tokyo.

On 29 July 2008, Lee was chosen as the Ambassador for the 2008 Seoul Hallyu Festival. He was also appointed the first Honorary Legal System Officer since the constitution of the Government Legislation Agency to commemorate their 60th anniversary.

In September 2008, Lee had a contractual dispute with his agency Mentor Entertainment, whom he was signed to since March 2004 in an exclusive contract for five years. Lee was being sued for ₩500 million for breach of contract and for supposedly hiding ₩1 billion in an attempt to "established his own agency in association with his manager". Lee countered that he "underwent significant financial damage as the company was poor in dealing with tax affairs and profit distribution" and he is said to have notified them of contract cancellation in February.

On 5 August 2009, Lee was appointed promotional ambassador of the Korea Tourism Organization. The same year, he starred in the comedic-action drama Hero, playing a reporter.

=== 2010–2012: Military service ===
In February 2010, upon the expiration of Lee's contract with Mentor Entertainment, he signed with a newly established independent agency, JG Company.

On 3 May 2010, Lee enlisted in the Republic of Korea Army to serve his mandatory military service. He first underwent five weeks of basic training at Nonsan military training camp, earning top scores in marksmanship, and was later drafted into active duty. He was assigned to the public relations department of the Ministry of National Defense He had initially applied for a postponement because he was in the midst of shooting Grand Prix with actress Kim Tae-hee, and was cast to star in television drama Faith. He was also chosen to represent Korea as a goodwill ambassador at the 2010 Shanghai Expo. However, Military Manpower Administration declined and sent a final notice for enlistment, leading him to pull out of both projects.

In August, Lee co-starred with fellow actor Ju Ji-hoon in military musical, Voyage of Life to commemorate the 60th anniversary of the Korean War. The musical was also co-produced by the Ministry of National Defense and Korea Musical Theatre Association, and was shown from 21 to 29 August in the National Theater of Korea. After serving 21 months of active duty, Lee was discharged on 16 February 2012 from the Defense Media Agency at Yongsan-dong, Yongsan District, Seoul.

=== 2012–2013: Comeback ===
In May 2012, Lee co-starred with Shin Min-a in MBC's period horror-romance Arang and the Magistrate, his first project after being discharged. The series was a success and became the most expensive drama to be sold to Japan by MBC. Lee was later recognized at the Seoul International Drama Awards, winning the Outstanding Korean Drama Actor award.

On 27 September 2012, Lee Joon Gi's JG Style was shown on Mnet Japan, documenting Lee's comeback to the entertainment industry. The series was later awarded the Grand Prize in the Korean wave category at the Skapa Award 2012 in Japan.

In 2013, Lee starred in the action thriller Two Weeks, playing a father struggling to save his daughter from leukemia while fighting a murder charge. He received Top Excellence Award in the male category at the 2nd APAN Star Awards.

=== 2014–present: Historical dramas and action roles ===
Lee signed with a new management agency, Namoo Actors. He then starred in the period drama Gunman in Joseon (2014) and won critical acclaim for his acting and action scenes, winning the Outstanding Korean Drama Actor for a second time at the Seoul International Drama Awards. The drama topped the ratings for its time slot and also garnered attention overseas, especially in China where it surpassed 200 million views in a month on Tencent QQ's video-viewing platform. This was followed by the vampire romance series Scholar Who Walks the Night in 2015, which earned Lee a "Top Ten Stars" award at the MBC Drama Awards. The same year, he was cast in his first Chinese movie, Never Said Goodbye.

In January 2016, Lee was cast in the lead role of 4th prince, Wang So, in Moon Lovers: Scarlet Heart Ryeo, a Korean remake of the Chinese television series, Scarlet Heart. The 20-episode drama, budgeted at US$13 million, premiered on 29 August 2016. The production was not well received domestically, but averaged 100 million cumulative views per episode during its simulcast on the Chinese video hosting site Youku and led to a rise in popularity for Lee in China. In preparation for his role as Wang So, the actor lost about 15 kg. During an interview with Chinese media outlet Sina, Lee Goon-gi explained in an interview, "The director wanted me to have a sharp vibe like an injured animal . So I went on a diet for 5-6 months and lost 15kg (~33lbs).

In October 2016, Lee signed as a new model for Lotte Duty-Free Shop. He also co-starred in a promotional web drama titled 7 First Kisses for the company. Lee made his expansion to Hollywood, when he made his debut with a small appearance in the sixth and final installment of the Resident Evil series titled, Resident Evil: The Final Chapter which was released worldwide in January 2017. The filming was originally conducted in secret, but the casting news was announced on 17 October 2015, when the film's lead actress Milla Jovovich posted a photo with Lee Joon-gi on her SNS. Director Paul W.S. Anderson screened Lee Joon-gi's drama and action scenes and offered him a special appearance via email. Lee Joon-gi revealed that he is a fan of the Resident Evil series, saying, "Rather than making a full-fledged Hollywood debut, I am doing my best to film as a fan of the series, focusing on the meaning of the appearance itself."

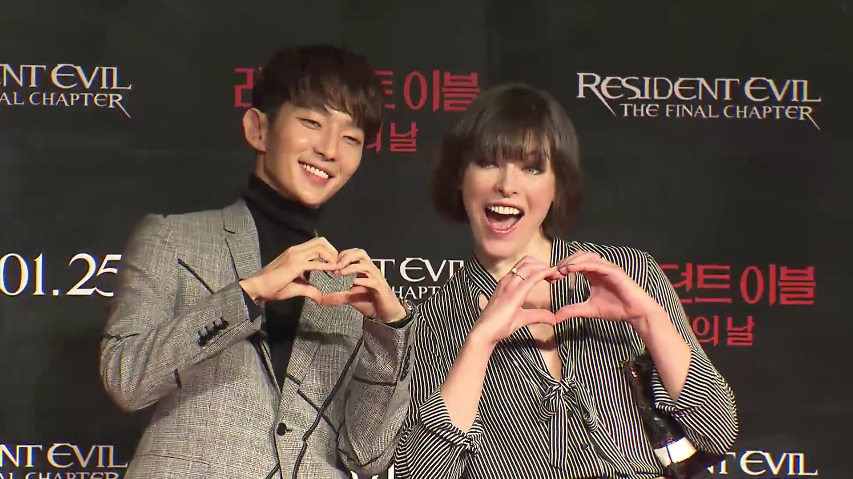
Lee poses for a photo with Milla Jovovich, who visited Korea to promote Resident Evil: The Final Chapter on 13 January 2017.

In 2017, Lee starred in tvN's crime procedural drama Criminal Minds, based on the American series of the same name. His convincing acting performance as a criminal profiler garnered him plaudits from critics and viewers.

In 2018, Lee returned to tvN and was cast in Lawless Lawyer, his first legal drama and the first time he has portrayed a lawyer. He reunited with director Kim Jin-min, who previously worked with him in Time Between Dog and Wolf.

In 2020, Lee was cast in the tvN thriller melodrama The Flower of Evil, reuniting him with Criminal Minds co-star Moon Chae-won. He was praised for his chemistry with Moon portraying a married couple. Lee's name was the most searched keyword on domestic search engines for three consecutive weeks, based on data compiled by Good Data Corporation. In an interview with magazines GQ and Allure, the actor revealed that unlike his previous acting style, he showed his acting ability by going back and forth between melodrama and thriller, with acting that was more subtle and contained emotions. For his performance, Lee was nominated for Best Actor – Television at 57th Baeksang Arts Awards.

In 2022, Lee made a comeback to the small screen with SBS drama Again My Life, his return to terrestrial television in six years since 2016.

In 2023, Lee starred in the second season of the tvN historical fantasy drama Arthdal Chronicles, where he portrayed a set of twins.

== Public image and acting style ==
Lee is widely recognized as a versatile and charismatic figure in South Korea's entertainment industry. He rose to fame with his breakout role in The King and the Clown (2005), which not only showcased his acting prowess but also positioned him as a central figure in the "flower boy" trend—a cultural shift that redefined masculinity in Korean pop culture by embracing softer, more androgynous aesthetics. By multiple sources, Lee has often been considered one of the most popular and handsome Korean actors, as well as one of K-drama's most beloved actors and a top Hallyu icon.

He is affectionately dubbed the "King of Sageuk" (historical dramas), due to his extensive and acclaimed work in period pieces such as Iljimae, Arang and the Magistrate, Gunman in Joseon, and The Scholar Who Walks the Night.

As an actor, Lee is celebrated for his "intense emotional range" and "physical expressiveness" Ten Asia commented, "his ability to harmonize a wide spectrum of emotions—from the dark, heavy tones of suspense to the warmth of melodrama—demonstrates an acting range without limits" as Nate News once commented on the actors most notable feature is his "refined and feminine appearance", but his actual personality is far from it. When Lee appeared in The King and the Clown, playing a clown man with a feminine personality. In a 2009 interview, the actor once said about his role, explaining "It was so different from my original personality that it was difficult to act." His acting is often characterized by his effective use of facial expressions and body language to convey the essence of each character he portrays. Senior Reporter Seo Byeong-gi from Herald Economy wrote in 2016 that Lee is "genuine, in ways passionate, sincere, and communicates genuinely. He never plays, he is serious and positive attitude is also reflected in his acting."

== Personal life ==
Lee enjoys learning and practicing different types of martial arts during his spare time. His father had signed him up for martial arts lessons as a child to keep him out of trouble and he continued practicing into adulthood, mostly to prepare for specific roles. Due to his proficiency in taekwondo and several other forms of martial arts, he rarely uses a stunt double for fight scenes and is recognized within the industry as one of the country's top action stars.

=== Tax audit ===
In 2023, the Gangnam Tax Office audited Lee and Namoo Actors. In March 2025, the agency said he had been assessed about ₩900 million in additional tax and had paid the amount. Namoo Actors said the dispute concerned tax-invoice transactions with JG Entertainment, a company Lee established, and whether the related income should be treated as that company's corporate income or as Lee's personal income. It described the outcome as a difference in the interpretation and application of tax law, said no other finding of evasion or underreporting had been raised, and noted that the issue had not been raised in regular audits in 2015 and 2019.

A pre-assessment review was rejected. Namoo Actors said an appeal had been filed with the Tax Tribunal. As of September 2026, no public decision on that appeal had been widely reported.

== Musical ==
Year	Title	Role	Ref.
2010	Voyage of Life		

== Discography ==
=== Albums ===
Year	Name	Track listing
2006	My Jun, My Style	1. "One Word"; 2. "Don't Know Love"; 3. "Foolish Love" (Babo Sarang)
2006	Nam Hyun-joon - One & Only	1. "Fly High" feat. Seo In-young
2009	J Style	1. "J Style"; 2. "Soliloquy"; 3. "I'm Ready"; 4. "Selfless Dedicated Tree"; 5. "Fiery Eyes" (Japanese album)
2012	Deucer Released: 16 March (limited edition); 25 April (regular edition)	1. "Together"; 2. "The Rain"; 3. "Born Again"; 4. "Sweet Memory"
2013	CBC / Case by Case Released: 29 January	1. "The Answer (Intro)"; 2. "Tonight"; 3. "Case By Case"; 4. "Closer"; 5. "Lost Frame"
2013	My Dear Released: 10 December	1. "Fever"; 2. "My Dear"; 3. "Fiery Eyes (New ver.)" 4. "Foolish Love (New ver.)" 5. "Selfless Dedicated Tree (New ver.)"
2014	Exhale Released: 21 November	1. "Ma Lady"; 2. "U"; 3. "For A While"; 4. "Bring Da Beat" (Feat. Yoo Seung-chan); 5. "Ma Lady (Inst.)"; 6. "For A While (Inst.)"
2016	Thank You Released: 3 December	1. "Thank You"; 2. "Now"; 3. "We Wish You a Merry Christmas"
2018	Delight Released: 10 December	1. "Accepted"; 2. "For Us"; 3. "Can't Be Slow"

=== Soundtrack appearances ===
Title	Year	Album	Ref.
"One Day"	2012	Arang and the Magistrate OST part 6	

== Bibliography ==
Year	Title	Notes	ISBN
2009	Lee Joon-gi Sawasdee Khrab	Photobook	ISBN 978-8996333319
2010	Hello Korean 1 with Lee Joon-gi (Korean, English, Chinese, Japanese edition)	Korean Textbooks + Audio CD	ISBN 978-8994011141 Korean Edition
2011	O'boy - for Splendid 2wenties of Lee Joon-gi (Published in Japan)	Photobook	ISBN 978-4903323527
2012	Time Between Dog and Wolf with Lee Joon-gi	Drama making book	ISBN 928-9201878
2013	Hello Korean 2 with Lee Joon-gi (Korean, English, Chinese, Japanese edition)	Korean Textbooks + Audio CD	ISBN 978-8994011332 Korean Edition
2014	Hello Korean 3 with Lee Joon-gi (Korean, English, Chinese, Japanese edition)	Korean Textbooks + Audio CD	ISBN 978-8994011417 Korean Edition

== Ambassadorship ==
Year	Activities	Ref.
2006	Honorary Ambassador for the 10th Bucheon International Fantastic Film Festival	
2007	Honorary PR Ambassador for the exhibition of 'Immortal painter'-Van Gogh	
2007	Honorary Ambassador for anti-piracy film	
2008	Goodwill Ambassador for cultural exchange between Korea and China	
2008	Honorary Ambassador for Seoul Hallyu Festival	
2008–2009	Honorary Legal System Officer (名譽法制官)	
2009–2010	Honorary Tourism Ambassador for the Korea Tourism Organization	
2010	Honorary PR Ambassador for the 2010 Shanghai Expo: Korea Pavilion in Shanghai, China	
2015–2016	Promotional ambassador of Ritz-Carlton Seoul	

== Awards and nominations ==
Name of the award ceremony, year presented, category, nominee of the award, and the result of the nomination
Award ceremony	Year	Category	Nominee / Work	Result	Ref.
Andre Kim Best Star Awards	2007	New and Superior Star Award	Lee Joon-gi	Won	
APAN Star Awards	2013	Top Excellence Award	Two Weeks	Won	
APAN Star Awards	2021	Popular Star Award, Actor	Flower of Evil	Nominated	
APAN Star Awards	2021	KT Seezn Star Award	Flower of Evil	Nominated	
Asia Artist Awards	2017	Fabulous Award	Criminal Minds	Won	
Asia Artist Awards	2020	Asia Celebrity	Flower of Evil	Won	
Asia Artist Awards	2020	Best Artist Award	Flower of Evil	Won	
Asia Model Awards	2007	K-Wave Special Award	Lee Joon-gi	Won	
Baeksang Arts Awards	2006	Best New Actor – Film	King and the Clown	Won	
Baeksang Arts Awards	2006	InStyle Fashionista Award	Lee Joon-gi	Won	
Baeksang Arts Awards	2007	Most Popular Actor – Film	Fly, Daddy, Fly	Won	
Baeksang Arts Awards	2009	Best Actor – Television	Iljimae	Nominated	
Baeksang Arts Awards	2021	Best Actor – Television	Flower of Evil	Nominated	
Blue Dragon Film Awards	2006	Best New Actor	King and the Clown	Nominated	
Blue Dragon Film Awards	2006	Popular Star Award	King and the Clown	Won	
Blue Dragon Film Awards	2006	Best On-Screen Couple Award (with Kam Woo-sung)	King and the Clown	Won	
Busan International Film Festival	2006	Male Rising Star Award	Lee Joon-gi	Nominated	
Busan International Film Festival	2007	Male Rising Star Award	Lee Joon-gi	Nominated	
China Fashion Awards	2007	South Korean Artist of the Year	Lee Joon-gi	Won	
Chunsa Film Art Awards	2006	Best New Actor	King and the Clown	Nominated	
Golden Cinema Film festival	2006	Best New Actor	King and the Clown	Won	
Grand Bell Awards	2006	Best New Actor	King and the Clown	Won	
Grand Bell Awards	2006	Popularity Award	King and the Clown	Won	
Grand Bell Awards	2006	Korean Wave Popularity Award	King and the Clown	Won	
Hawaii International Film Festival	2007	Rising Star Award	Lee Joon-gi	Won	
KBS Drama Awards	2014	Top Excellence Award	Gunman in Joseon	Nominated	
KBS Drama Awards	2014	Excellence Award	Gunman in Joseon	Won	
KBS Drama Awards	2014	Best Couple Award (with Nam Sang-mi)	Gunman in Joseon	Won	
Korean Film Awards	2006	Best New Actor	King and the Clown	Won	
Korean Martial Arts Federation	2009	Martial Arts Actor Award	Time Between Dog and Wolf, Iljimae	Won	
Korea Youth Film Festival	2006	Best New Actor	Lee Joon-gi	Won	
Max Movie Awards	2006	Best Actor	King and the Clown	Won	
MBC Drama Awards	2007	Excellence Award	Time Between Dog and Wolf	Won	
MBC Drama Awards	2009	Top Excellence Award	Hero	Nominated	
MBC Drama Awards	2009	Popularity Award	Hero	Won	
MBC Drama Awards	2012	Top Excellence Award	Arang and the Magistrate	Nominated	
MBC Drama Awards	2012	Best Couple Award (with Shin Min-a)	Arang and the Magistrate	Won	
MBC Drama Awards	2013	Excellence Award	Two Weeks	Nominated	
MBC Drama Awards	2015	Top Excellence Award	Scholar Who Walks the Night	Nominated	
MBC Drama Awards	2015	Top 10 Stars Award	Scholar Who Walks the Night	Won	
Mnet 20's Choice Awards	2007	Best Pretty Boy	Lee Joon-gi	Nominated	
Mnet 20's Choice Awards	2008	Hot Global Star	Lee Joon-gi	Nominated	
Mnet 20's Choice Awards	2008	Hot Drama Star, Male	Iljimae	Nominated	
Mnet KM Music Festival	2006	Best Actor in a Music Video	Grace (by Lee Soo-young)	Won	
SBS Drama Awards	2008	Top Excellence Award	Iljimae	Won	
SBS Drama Awards	2008	Netizen Popularity Award	Iljimae	Won	
SBS Drama Awards	2008	Top 10 Stars	Iljimae	Won	
SBS Drama Awards	2016	Grand Prize (Daesang)	Moon Lovers: Scarlet Heart Ryeo	Nominated	
SBS Drama Awards	2016	Top Excellence Award	Moon Lovers: Scarlet Heart Ryeo	Nominated	
SBS Drama Awards	2016	Hallyu Star Award	Moon Lovers: Scarlet Heart Ryeo	Won	
SBS Drama Awards	2016	Top 10 Stars Award	Moon Lovers: Scarlet Heart Ryeo	Won	
SBS Drama Awards	2016	Best Couple Award (with Lee Ji-eun)	Moon Lovers: Scarlet Heart Ryeo	Won	
SBS Drama Awards	2022	Top Excellence Award, Actor in a Miniseries Genre/Fantasy Drama	Again My Life	Won	
SBS Drama Awards	2022	Grand Prize (Daesang)	Again My Life	Nominated	
Seoul International Drama Awards	2008	Most Popular Actor	Time Between Dog and Wolf	Won	
Seoul International Drama Awards	2013	Outstanding Korean Actor	Arang and the Magistrate	Won	
Seoul International Drama Awards	2015	Outstanding Korean Actor	Gunman in Joseon	Won	
Shanghai International Film Festival	2007	Overseas Star Award	Lee Joon-gi	Won	
Skapa Awards	2012	Grand Prize, Korean wave category	Lee Joon-gi's JG Style	Won	
Soompi Awards	2018	Actor of the Year	Criminal Minds	Won	
StarHub's Night of Stars Awards	2018	Best Male Asian Star	Lawless Lawyer	Won	
Taiwan's KKTV Awards	2016	Actor of the Year	Moon Lovers: Scarlet Heart Ryeo	Won	
Tourism Authority of Thailand	2009	Special plaque of Appreciation	Lee Joon-gi	Won	
