= Otoha =

- Gender: Female

Origin
- Origin: Japanese
- Meaning: different meanings depending on the kanji used

Other names
- Alternative spelling: おとは, オトハ

Otoha (おとは, オトハ) is a feminine Japanese given name.

Otoha can be written using different kanji characters and can mean:

- 乙羽, "maiden, feathers"
- 乙葉, "maiden, leaf"
- 音羽, "sound, feathers"
- 音葉, "sound, leaf"

The name can also be written in hiragana or katakana.

== People ==
- Otoha (actress) (乙葉, born 1981), a Japanese tarento and gravure idol

== Fictional Characters ==
- Otoha (音翅), a character in the Genesis of Aquarion (OVA)
- Otoha (音羽), a character in H2O: Footprints in the Sand series
- Otoha (乙羽), the protagonist of Karas
- Otoha Kisaragi (如月 乙羽), a supporting character in Kannazuki no Miko
- Otoha Kurogane (黒鉄 音羽), a main character in Rock Is a Lady's Modesty
- Otoha Sakurano (桜野 音羽), a main character in the Sky Girls anime
- Otoha Shinjo (新城 音羽), a character in the light novel and manga series Marriage Royale
- Otoha Takanashi (小鳥遊 おとは), a character in the Pretty Rhythm: Rainbow Live
