= Time Between Dog and Wolf =

South Korean television program

- Promotional poster
- Also known as: Hour of the Dog and Wolf; Time of Dog and Wolf
- Hangul: 개와 늑대의 시간
- Hanja: 개와 늑대의 時間
- RR: Gaewa neukdaeui sigan
- MR: Kaewa nŭktaeŭi sigan
- Genre: Action, Drama; Romance
- Written by: Han Ji-hoon; Yoo Young-jae
- Directed by: Kim Jin-min
- Starring: Lee Joon-gi; Nam Sang-mi; Jung Kyung-ho
- Music by: Noh Hyeong-woo
- Country of origin: South Korea
- Original language: Korean
- No. of episodes: 16

Production
- Producers: Yoon Shin-ae; Kim Ju-sung; Bang Sang-yeon
- Production locations: South Korea; Thailand
- Running time: 60 minutes
- Production companies: Apple Tree Pictures; CJ Entertainment

Original release
- Network: MBC TV
- Release: July 18 – September 6, 2007

Time Between Dog and Wolf (Korean: 개와 늑대의 시간) is a 2007 South Korean action-romance drama, starring Lee Joon-gi, Nam Sang-mi and Jung Kyung-ho. It aired on MBC from July 18 to September 6, 2007 on Wednesdays and Thursdays at 21:55 (KST) for 16 episodes.

== Title ==
The unique title is taken from a French saying "entre chien et loup" and refers to the moments after sunset when the sky darkens and vision becomes unclear, making it difficult to distinguish between dogs and wolves, friends and foe.

== Synopsis ==
After his mother was brutally murdered in front of him by the Thai Qing Faction's gangster Mao, Lee Soo-hyun (Lee Joon-gi) was adopted into NIS agent Kang Jung-ho's family. Together with Min-ki (Jung Kyung-ho), Jung-ho's son, Soo-hyun becomes an NIS agent. Soo-hyun met Ji-woo (Nam Sang-mi) when they were about twelve years old and has another fateful encounter with her 10 years later. Together they have promises for the future.

One day, Soo-hyun leaves for an operation dealing with the Cheongbang, only to return in failure because of the resurfacing terrible childhood memories of when he was in Thailand. Due to his thirst for personal revenge and ignoring orders, Soo-hyun was fired and stripped of his title as an NIS agent. The head of NIS, Jung, proposes to the distraught Soo-hyun to infiltrate the Cheongbang. Through Chief Jung's proposition, Soo-hyun becomes an undercover NIS agent after staging his own death (car accident). Hiding his past, Soo-hyun infiltrates the Cheongbang with revenge in mind, leaving Ji-woo behind. Under the pseudonym Kay, he passes through the backstreets of Bangkok. He plans on becoming one of Mao's underlings to uncover Mao's illegal business. What Soo-hyun didn't know was Ji-woo is the daughter of the same villain, who killed his mother and father.

Meanwhile, Min-ki has fallen in love with Ji-woo and she begins to consider his proposal to officially court and forget Soo-hyun. Soo-hyun, now known as Kay, heard that Mao likes Muay Thai (Thailand Kickboxing), so Kay becomes a Muay Thai athlete, hoping Mao would see him. Mao came to one Muay Thai game in which Kay deliberately loses the match. At the fighter's resting room, he overheard conversation between a Cheongbang's Mini Boss and his subordinate planning to kill Mao. When Mao went up to the stage to honour the champion, the assassin aims at him but Kay saves Mao. Mao then took Kay as his right-hand man. Mao and his gang go to Korea to expand their drug business. They started a company called BS Enterprise. Kay's mission was to protect Ji-woo from the Korean gang, Spider.

The Spider Boss tries to kidnap Ji-woo, but little did they know Soo-hyun was protecting her by following around in his car under Mao's orders. When Ji-woo was rescued by him, she was in great shock. He hides her from the Spider gang by dropping her off behind the containers and backs right out of the dead end to engage in a dangerous car chase. Soo-hyun gets shot in the head and loses control, his car then falls off the port wharf into the sea. He wakes up later in a wise old lady's house. But he suffered from amnesia. Later, he gets kidnapped by the Spider gang and is used as bait for their trap to capture Mao. Things get turned around and Kay kills the Spider Boss and saves Mao once again. Mao now sees Kay as not only his life savior but a son. For the Qing Faction gang, Kay's words are Mao's orders.

One day, Mao comes to Ji-woo (his daughter) and she sees Soo-hyun. She is in shock again. Later, she meets him again but does not believe it is him because of his jerkish attitude. He told her that she was heartless for rejecting her biological father when he went to see her and very selfish. She gets angry and when she gets home, she ripped up a picture she drew of him before.

While protecting Mao's girlfriend as she was shopping, Soo-hyun's adopted dad sees him. He looked at him without recognizing him as his adopted father was checking him out. His adopted dad then tells the Chief of the NIS that Soo-hyun has amnesia. They plan to save him from the gang. While on this mission, the Spider gang's follower (now part of Mao's gang) stabs Soo-hyun's adopted dad when he was trying to tell Soo-hyun that he is not Kay but Soo-hyun. This is where Soo-hyun begins to doubt himself as Kay.

The ex-follower of the Spider gang ran away after trying to persuade Kay to go with him. Min-ki arrives at the scene and sees Kay looking over his fatally wounded father. When his father dies subsequently at the hospital, Min-ki vows to kill Kay with his own hands.

Over the span of the next episodes, Min-ki and an old ex-NIS agent and restaurant owner form an investigation team secretly with two other NIS employees. Min-ki becomes obsessed with bringing down Kay and Cheongbang (Mao's gang). Ji-woo is convinced that Kay is Soo-hyun.

== Cast ==
- Lee Joon-gi as Lee Soo-hyun / Kay
  - Park Gun-woo as young Soo-hyun

He is an NIS agent. Underneath his quiet demeanor, he has a violent temper. At a young age, he lost his mother when she was killed by Mao, a Triad gang member. NIS agent Kang Jung-ho adopted him and raised him with his son Min-ki. After learning that Mao became a Triad boss, he infiltrates the gang as an undercover agent. He assumes a new name, Kay, and goes on a rampage as a gangster to gain the trust of his gang. His life breaks out in chaos due to the grief he can't let go of in his heart, which leads him to become obsessed with revenge and lose much of the precious things in life.

- Nam Sang-mi as Seo Ji-woo / Ari

She is an art director. She has a bright personality and is very considerate to other people. She's honest about her feelings. She is the only daughter of Cheongbang's Boss, Mao.

- Jung Kyung-ho as Kang Min-ki

An NIS agent as well, he is the biological son of Lee Soo-hyun's adopted father. Growing up together with Soo-hyun, he realizes that he will always be Soo-hyun's shadow in everyone's eyes. But he doesn't let this get in the way of his and Soo-hyun's close relationship. He longs for his father's attention (who seems to be trained on Soo-hyun) and the love of Ji-woo, who is in love with Soo-hyun. He changes during the series from a carefree smile to eyes of revenge.

- Kim Kap-soo as Chief Jung Hak-soo
- Choi Jae-sung as Mao
- Cha Soo-yeon as Oh Ming
- Lee Ki-young as Kang Jung-ho
- Lee Tae-sung as Bae Sang-shik
- Choi Ji-ho as "Giraffe"

== Ratings ==
- In the table below, the blue numbers represent the lowest ratings and the red numbers represent the highest ratings.

Ep.	Original broadcast date	Average audience share	
Ep.	Original broadcast date	AGB Nielsen	
Ep.	Original broadcast date	Nationwide	Seoul
1	July 18, 2007	10.8% (9th)	11.7% (9th)
2	July 19, 2007	10.9% (10th)	12.0% (9th)
3	July 25, 2007	13.7% (7th)	14.3% (6th)
4	July 26, 2007	15.1% (6th)	16.2% (5th)
5	August 1, 2007	13.0% (6th)	14.1% (7th)
6	August 2, 2007	14.1% (5th)	15.3% (3rd)
7	August 8, 2007	17.1% (3rd)	18.4% (2nd)
8	August 9, 2007	17.1% (4th)	18.6% (2nd)
9	August 15, 2007	18.0% (3rd)	19.4% (2nd)
10	August 16, 2007	16.7% (3rd)	17.0% (3rd)
11	August 22, 2007	15.6% (7th)	16.6% (7th)
12	August 23, 2007	15.8% (6th)	16.8% (5th)
13	August 29, 2007	15.5% (6th)	16.3% (6th)
14	August 30, 2007	16.3% (6th)	16.7% (6th)
15	September 5, 2007	16.6% (6th)	17.4% (6th)
16	September 6, 2007	16.7% (6th)	17.3% (5th)
Average		15.2%	16.1%

Source: TNS Media Korea

== Awards ==
2007 MBC Drama Awards

- Excellence Award, Actor - Lee Joon-gi
- Excellence Award, Actress - Nam Sang-mi

2008 Seoul International Drama Awards

- Netizen Popularity Award, Actor - Lee Joon-gi
- Netizen Popularity Award, Actress - Nam Sang-mi
- Netizen Favorite Drama

== International broadcast ==
It aired in Japan on satellite channel WOWOW in February 2008.
