= Ijinasi =

- Hangul: 이진아시
- Hanja: 伊珍阿豉
- Revised Romanization: Ijinasi
- McCune–Reischauer: Ijinasi

Ijinasi or Naejinjuji (內珍朱智) was the founder and first king of Daegaya.

== Name ==
The name Ijinasi and Naejinjuji appears in the Samguk sagi. (Note: Samguk sagi, Book 34. Geography of Silla, "高靈郡，本大加耶國，自始祖伊珍阿豉王一云內珍朱智至道設智王凡十六世五百二十年，眞興大王侵滅之，以其地爲大加耶郡，景德王改名，今因之，領縣二，冶爐縣，本赤火縣，景德王改名，今因之，新復縣，本加尸兮縣，景德王改名，今未詳")

== Legends about his birth ==
There are two legends about his birth.

=== Fall from the sky and born from an egg ===
According to a legend recorded in the Samguk yusa written in the 13th century, in the year 42 CE, six eggs descended from heaven with a message that they would be kings. Six boys were born, and within 12 days they grew mature. One of them, named Suro, became the king of Geumgwan Gaya, and the other five founded the remaining five Gayas, namely Daegaya, Seongsan Gaya, Ara Gaya, Goryeong Gaya, and Sogaya.

=== The son of Junggyeonmoju ===
According to Joseon dynasty geography book Shinjeungdonggukyeojiseungram (新增東國輿地勝覽), a local goddess called Jeonggyeonmoju (正見母主) gave birth to Ijinasi and King Suro after being influenced by sky god Ibiga (夷毗訶) (Note: Shinjeungdonggukyeojiseungram, Book 29, The History of Goryeong County, "本大伽倻國(詳見金海府山川下) 自始祖伊珍阿豉王 (一云 內珍朱智) 至道設智王 凡十六世五百二十年 (按崔致遠 釋利貞傳云, 伽倻山神, 正見母主, 乃爲天神夷毗謌之所感, 生大伽倻王惱窒朱日. 金官國王惱窒靑裔二人, 則惱窒朱日, 爲伊珍阿豉王之別稱, 靑裔, 爲首露王之別稱, 然與駕洛國왕古記六卵之說, 俱荒誕不可信, 又釋順應傳, 大伽倻國月光太子, 乃正見之十世孫, 父曰異腦王, 求婚于新羅, 迎夷粲比枝輩之女, 而生太子, 則異腦王, 乃惱窒朱日之八世孫也, 然亦不可考.)".)

== In popular culture ==
- Portrayed by Go Joo-won in the 2010 MBC TV series Kim Su-ro, The Iron King
