= Kim Su-ro, The Iron King =

2010 South Korean television series

- Promotional poster
- Also known as: Kim Soo-ro
- Hangul: 김수로
- RR: Gim Suro
- MR: Kim Suro
- Genre: Period drama
- Written by: Kim Mi-sook; Jang Seon-ah
- Directed by: Choi Jong-soo
- Starring: Ji Sung; Bae Jong-ok; Yu Oh-seong; Seo Ji-hye; Go Joo-won; Kang Byul; Lee Pil-mo
- Country of origin: South Korea
- Original language: Korean
- No. of episodes: 32

Production
- Executive producer: Jang Geun-soo
- Producer: Hong Soon-gwan
- Production company: Sangsang Networks

Original release
- Network: Munhwa Broadcasting Corporation
- Release: May 29 – September 18, 2010

Kim Su-ro, The Iron King (Korean: 김수로) is a 2010 South Korean television series on the life of Suro of Geumgwan Gaya, starring Ji Sung, Bae Jong-ok, Yu Oh-seong, Seo Ji-hye, Go Joo-won, Kang Byul and Lee Pil-mo. It aired on MBC from May 29 to September 18, 2010, on Saturdays and Sundays at 21:45 for 32 episodes.

== Plot ==
The ₩20 billion-budget historical drama charts the life of Kim Su-ro, who unified 12 small countries to become the legendary founder and ruler of Geumgwan Gaya, the city-state of the Gaya confederacy which dominated sea trade and iron working during the Three Kingdoms period in the 5th century. Kim Su-ro's fiery temperament, charisma and intelligence are his only defense in an extended political struggle, with competition for the throne from his half-brother and lifelong rival, Ijinashi (first king of the state of Daegaya), his former friend Seok Tal-hae, and the dangerous ambitions of Shingwi Ghan.

== Cast ==
=== Main ===
- Ji Sung as Kim Su-ro
  - Park Gun-woo as young Kim Su-ro
- Bae Jong-ok as Queen Jeong-kyeon, Su-ro and Ijinashi's mother
- Yu Oh-seong as Shingwi Gan / Tae-gang
- Seo Ji-hye as Heo Hwang-ok aka Sembavalam, the daughter of an Indian merchant who later becomes Su-ro's wife
- Go Joo-won as Ijinashi, Queen Jeongkyeon's son and later the founder of Daegaya
  - Won Deok-hyun as young Ijinashi
- Kang Byul as Ah-hyo, Princess of Saro State
- Lee Pil-mo as Seok Tal-hae, 4th King of Saro State
  - Shin Dong-ki as young Tal-hae

=== Supporting ===
==== People around Kim Su-ro ====
- Lee Jong-won as Jo-Bang, Su-ro's stepfather
- Jang Dong-jik as Yoo-Chun / Deuk-Sun, the Former Emperor Kwangmoo's nephew and Won-Su's son who is Su-ro's helper
- Lee Duk-hee as Doctor Ah-jin (nickname: Uiseonhalmi [의선할미])
- Kang Shin-il as Seon-Do, a Godfather of international trade and Su-ro's teacher
- Yoon Joo-sang as Mul-Soe, a Blacksmith
- Choi Soo-rin as Jo-Bang's wife and Su-ro's stepmother
- Jung Jae-gon as Sa-Bok, Jo-Bang's pawn

==== People in Gaya State ====
- Lee Hyo-jung as Yibiga, Ijinashi's biological father
- Lee Won-jong as Yeom Sa-chi
- Choi Hwa-jung as Nok Sa-dan

==== People in Silla ====
- Kwon Sung-duk as Namhae-chachawoong
- Wang Bit-na as Ah-Ro, Chachawoong's little sister and Park Hyeokgeose's daughter
- Kim Shi-won as Ho-Gong

==== Other ====
- Kim Ki-hyun as Heo Jang-sang, Heo Hwang-ok's father
- Kim Hye-eun as Na Chal-nyeo, Goddess of Heaven who protects Sodo
- Baek So-mi as Hae-rye, a Bridesmaid
- Kim Hyung-beom as Chu-Kyung, Yeom Sa-chi's loyalman
- Seo Sung-gwang as Yong-Bi
- Chae Bin as Yeo-Ui, Shin Gwi-chon's slave
- Lee Ah-jin as Beo-Deul, a Long Prelude Mountain Girl
- Jun Jin-gi as Ya-Chul
- Joo Ho as Seok-chil
- Kim Hyung-il as Kim-Yoong, Su-ro's biological father
- Han Min-chae as So-Hwa
- Shim Hoon-gi as No-Du
- Joo Sung-min

== Lawsuit ==
After she was fired in June 2010, writer Kim Mi-sook sued the production company for damages amounting to ₩576 million (or US$478,600).
