= Park Hee-jun =

South Korean filmmaker (born 1971)

- Born: 1971 (age 54–55); South Korea
- Occupations: Film director, screenwriter

Korean name
- Hangul: 박희준
- RR: Bak Huijun
- MR: Pak Hŭijun

Park Hee-jun (Korean: 박희준; born 1971) is a South Korean film director and screenwriter. Park debuted with the fantasy action film Dream of a Warrior (2001) which starred Hong Kong actor Leon Lai.

== Filmography ==
- Dream of a Warrior (2001) - director, screenwriter
- Birth of a Man (2002) - director, script editor
- Mandate (2008) - director, screenwriter, executive producer
- Brothers in Heaven (2018) - director, screenwriter
