= Lee Young-ah =

South Korean actress (born 1984)

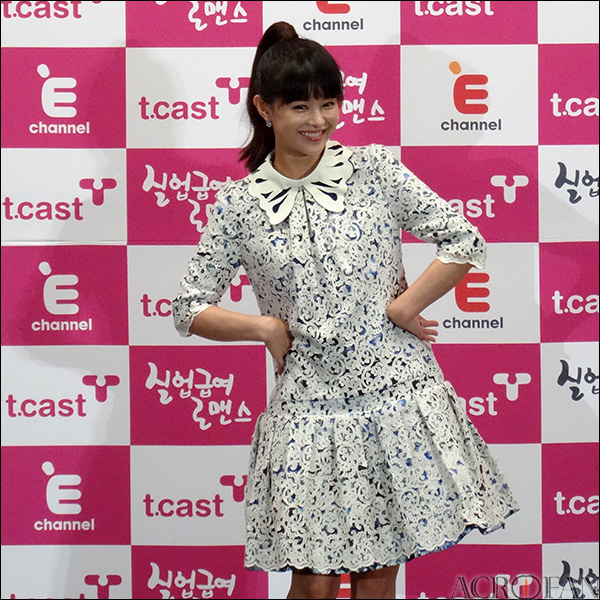
- Lee in 2013
- Born: October 23, 1984 (age 42); Suseong District, Daegu, South Korea
- Education: Hanyang University – Bachelor of Arts in Dance
- Occupation: Actress
- Years active: 2003–present
- Spouse: Unknown (m. 2021)
- Children: 1

Korean name
- Hangul: 이영아
- Hanja: 李英雅
- RR: I Yeonga
- MR: I Yŏnga

Lee Young-ah (Korean: 이영아; born October 23, 1984) is a South Korean actress and model. She is best known for playing the role of Nguyen Jin Joo in Golden Bride, a 2008 drama that was extended by 14 episodes due to its popularity. It was in the Top 3 Korean Dramas of the South Korean Nielson Ratings during January–February 2008 and the Top 7 for TNmS Ratings.

She is also known for her role in the drama Bread, Love and Dreams as Yang Mi-sun, the love interest of main character, Kim Tak-goo. She won the 2010 KBS Drama Awards "Best Couple Award" for this role together with Yoon Shi-yoon.

== Career ==
Lee Young Ah began acting when she was 19 years old. She first appeared in the SBS TV Drama I Love You, My Enemy as well as The Youth in Bare Foot, Golden Apple and Wedding. In the 42nd Baeksang Arts Awards, she won the Best New Actress Award for her role as the young Kyung Sook in Golden Apple.

She also put in cameo appearances in movies such as Ghost Story, Caramel, Two Faces of My Girlfriend and lent her voice in Dachimawa Lee.

In 2006, she got her first lead in a TV series, Love Can't Wait, where she plays a 19-year-old senior in a girls' school who falls in love with a poor college law student played by Hong Kyung-min. In the same year, she appeared in a music video by Eru, titled Black Glasses along with Kim Hyun-joong.

Her next lead role in a drama was Golden Bride in 2007, where Lee plays a young bride from Vietnam. In order to appease her blind mother, she marries a Korean man to search for her father in Korea. The drama acquired high TV Ratings which led to the addition of 14 more episodes.

In 2008, she was cast as the second female lead in the drama Iljimae where she played Bong Soon, a funny and silly swindler related to the past of the male lead. She co-stars with Han Hyo-joo, Lee Joon-gi and Park Si-hoo.

In 2009, she was in the drama Empress Chun Chu where she played Empress Dae Mok.

In 2010, she was again one of the main leads in Bread, Love and Dreams as Yang Mi-sun. She sang a song in the series titled Love Is. The series earned high ratings and was also shown in the Philippines, Vietnam and other countries.

After her success in Bread, Love and Dreams, she joined the main cast in Vampire Prosecutor and again in Vampire Prosecutor 2 as prosecutor, Yoo Jung-In.

In 2013, she starred in the short 10 episode drama Unemployed Romance along with Namkoong Min. The drama follows the love story of an unemployed drama screenwriter who ends up meeting and then falling in love with, the worker at the unemployment benefits center responsible for distributing her unemployment checks.

== Personal life ==
In November 2018, it was confirmed by their respective agencies that Lee and her Love to the End co-star Kang Eun-tak have been dating since October 2018. In April 2019, it was confirmed by their respective agencies that Lee and Kang Eun-tak had ended their relationship earlier that year.

Lee Young-ah was due to be marry her non-celebrity boyfriend in March 2020, but due to the COVID-19 pandemic in South Korea, the wedding was postponed to the end of the year. On August 23, 2020, Lee's agency announced that she had given birth to her first child, a son.

== Filmography ==
=== Film ===
Year	Title	Role	Notes	Ref.
2006	A Ghost's Story			
2006	Caramel			
2007	Two Faces of My Girlfriend	Glamor girl		
2008	Dachimawa Lee	Navigation voice	Cameo	
2011	Julie's Land Adventures	Julie	Animated; Korean dubbing	
2012	Natural Burials	Chung-ah		
2015	Snow in Sea Breeze	Sun-mi		
2018	Notebook from My Mother	Daughter		

=== Television series ===
Year	Title	Role	Notes	Ref.
2005	I Love You, My Enemy	Kim Mi-hyang		
2005	The Barefooted Youth			
2005	Wedding			
2005	Golden Apple	young Kyung-sook		
2006	Love Can't Wait	Seo Eun-min		
2007	Golden Bride	Nguyen Jin-joo		
2008	Iljimae	Bong-soon		
2009	Empress Cheonchu	Empress Daemok		
2010	Bread, Love and Dreams	Yang Mi-sun		
2011	Vampire Prosecutor	Yoo Jung-in		
2012	Natural Burials	Chung-ah		
2012	Dream of the Emperor	Queen Seungman		
2012	Vampire Prosecutor 2	Yoo Jung-in		
2013	Unemployed Romance	Im Seung-hee		
2014	KBS Drama Special: "Bomi's Room"	Gong Eon-joo		
2014	Run, Jang-mi	Baek Jang-mi		
2015	Cheo Yong	Kim Yoo-ri	Season 2; Cameo (Episode 1)	
2018	Love to the End	Han Ka-young		

=== Variety shows ===
Year	Title	Role	Notes	Ref.
2003	Kang Ho-dong's Soulmates			
2011	Home Sweet Home (Dalgona) (추석특집 달고나)	Host		
2011–2012	Comedy Big League	Host	Season 1–2	
2012	Love Cook			
2014	Law of the Jungle in Borneo	Cast member		

=== Music videos appearances ===
Year	Song title	Artist	Ref.
2006	"Black Glasses"	Eru	
2009	"Why Did You Call..."		

== Discography ==
=== Soundtrack appearances ===
Year	Track	Album
2010	"Love Is"	Bread, Love and Dreams OST

== Awards and nominations ==
Name of the award ceremony, year presented, category, nominee of the award, and the result of the nomination
Award ceremony	Year	Category	Nominee / Work	Result	Ref.
Baeksang Arts Awards	2006	Best New Actress (TV)	Golden Apple	Won	
Baeksang Arts Awards	2009	Most Popular Actress (TV)	Iljimae	Nominated	
KBS Drama Awards	2010	Best Couple Award	Lee Young-ah (with Yoon Shi-yoon); Bread, Love and Dreams	Won	
KBS Drama Awards	2018	Excellence Award, Actor in a Daily Drama	Love to the End	Nominated	
Korean Broadcasting Awards	2008	Best New Actress	Iljimae	Won	
SBS Drama Awards	2008	Excellence Award, Actress in a Drama Special	Iljimae	Nominated	
SBS Drama Awards	2015	Excellence Award, Actress in a Serial Drama	Run, Jang-mi	Nominated	
