= Go Joo-won =

South Korean actor (born 1981)

- Born: Go Young-chul; October 16, 1981 (age 44); Gwangju, South Korea
- Education: Sogang University; Yonsei University Graduate School of Journalism and Mass Communication
- Occupation: Actor
- Years active: 2003–present
- Agent: Huayi Brothers

Korean name
- Hangul: 고영철
- RR: Go Yeongcheol
- MR: Ko Yŏngch'ŏl

Stage name
- Hangul: 고주원
- RR: Go Juwon
- MR: Ko Chuwŏn

Go Joo-won (Korean: 고주원; born October 16, 1981), birth name Go Young-chul, is a South Korean actor. He made his acting debut in the 2003 boxing series Punch, followed by a supporting role in the revenge-themed Resurrection (2005). In 2006, Go became a household name after appearing in the popular family dramas Bizarre Bunch and Famous Chil Princesses. He then played historical figures in two period dramas—King Seongjong of Joseon in The King and I (2007), and Ijinashi, the first king of Daegaya in Kim Su-ro, The Iron King (2010). Go also starred in the medical drama OB/GYN (also known as Obstetrics and Gynecology Doctors, 2010), and another family drama You Are the Best! (2013).

== Filmography ==
=== Television series ===
Year	Title	Role
2003	Punch	Yoon-pyo
2004	Kkakdugi	Gak-doo
2004	Toji, the Land	Song Young-kwang
2005	Resurrection	Jung Jin-woo
2005	Bizarre Bunch	Jang Seok-hyun
2006	Famous Chil Princesses	Yoo Il-han
2007	The King and I	King Seongjong
2008	My Lady	Kim Hyun-min
2010	OB & GY	Lee Sang-shik
2010	Kim Su-ro, The Iron King	Ijinashi
2013	You Are the Best!	Park Chan-woo
2014	There Is a Bluebird	Doctor Oh
2014	4 Legendary Witches	Ma Do-hyun (cameo)
2014	Run, Jang-mi	Hwang Tae-ja
2016	Madame Antoine: The Love Therapist	Go Hye-rim's ex-husband
2019	Love in Sadness	Ha Seong-ho
2019	Haechi	Yi In-jwa
2023–2024	Live Your Own Life	Kang Tae-min

=== Film ===
Year	Title	Role
2005	Tarzan Park Heung-suk	Park Heung-suk

=== Variety shows ===
Year	Title	Role
2009–2010	Let's Go! Dream Team Season 2	Cast member (episodes 10–13, 28)
2014	Star Friend	Cast member
2015	Off to School	Cast member (episodes 53–56)
2016	Let's Go Expedition Time	Cast member
2019	Taste of Love	Cast member (episode 16 – present)

== Awards and nominations ==
Year	Award	Category	Nominated work	Result
2005	KBS Drama Awards	Best New Actor	Bizarre Bunch	Won
2006	7th Korea Visual Arts Festival	Photogenic Award, Actor category	—N/a	Won
2006	KBS Drama Awards	Excellence Award, Actor	Famous Chil Princesses	Won
2015	SBS Drama Awards	Excellence Award, Actor in a Serial Drama	Run, Jang-mi	Nominated
