= Love Can't Wait (TV series) =

- Also known as: The Love That Will Not Be Stopped by Anyone
- Written by: Jung Hyung-jung
- Directed by: Lee Tae-gon; Kim Dae-jin
- Starring: Hong Kyung-min; Lee Young-ah; Choi Jung-yoon; Choi Kyu-hwan
- Country of origin: South Korea
- Original language: Korean
- No. of episodes: 198

Production
- Executive producer: Jang Geun-soo
- Running time: 30 minutes
- Production company: JS Pictures

Original release
- Network: Munhwa Broadcasting Corporation
- Release: January 1 – July 2, 2006

Love Can't Wait (Korean: 사랑은 아무도 못말려; RR: Sarangeun amudo monmallyeo) is a 2006 South Korean television series starring Hong Kyung-min and Lee Young-ah. It aired on MBC from January 1 to July 2, 2006 on Mondays to Fridays at 20:20 for 198 episodes.

It tells the love story of an immature 19-year-old senior from a girls' high school and a penniless but intelligent 25-year-old college student studying law.

== Synopsis ==
Cheerful and flighty high school senior Seo Eun-min (Lee Young-ah) meets Tae-kyeong (Hong Kyung-min), an independent and responsible law student, when she goes to the university library to run an errand for her sister. She instantly falls in love and lies to him that she's a scriptwriter. They start dating, and Tae-kyeong falls in love with the charming Eun-min. However, Eun-min's lie does not last long when they meet again as private tutor and student. Since Eun-min hates studying more than anything, Tae-kyeong tells her that she should do something else with her life if she does not want to go to college, and drags her to the Haja Center. Knowing that he has faith in her and wants what's best for her, Eun-min impulsively decides to marry him. Proud that Tae-kyeong is the first thing that's hers alone, at first Eun-min treats their marriage as an accomplishment in itself and their poor circumstances as a game: she does not mind that their ₩10 million basement apartment is windowless, and has leaky ceilings and rats. But the hardships of poverty and newlywed life soon make her grow up fast.

== Cast ==
=== Main cast ===
- Hong Kyung-min as Kim Tae-kyeong, college student
- Lee Young-ah as Seo Eun-min, high school senior
- Choi Jung-yoon as Seo Eun-joo, scriptwriter and Eun-min's older sister
- Choi Kyu-hwan as Hwang Young-min, scriptwriter

=== Supporting cast ===
- Baek Il-seob as Kim Cheol-hwan, Tae-kyeong's father
- Jung Hye-sun as Kang Soon-ja, Tae-kyeong's mother
- Yoon Hae-young as Kim Tae-hee, Tae-kyeong's sister
- Lee Doo-il as Kim Tae-soo, Tae-kyeong's older brother
- Kim Ji-young as Kang Hee-jung, Tae-soo's wife
- Jo Yoon-hee as Kang Hee-soo, Hee-jung's younger sister
- Park Won-sook as Kang Yeon-sook, Eun-min's mother
- Sunwoo Yong-nyeo as Kang In-sook, Eun-min's aunt
- Hyun Seok as Eun-min's father
- Lee Hyun-woo as Yoon Ki-hoon, divorced manhwa artist
- Lee Eun as Oh Young-shim, Eun-min's friend
