= Vampire Prosecutor =

2011–2012 South Korean television series

- Promotional poster
- Hangul: 뱀파이어 검사
- Hanja: 뱀파이어 檢査
- RR: Baempaieo geomsa
- MR: Paemp'aiŏ kŏmsa
- Genre: Mystery; Police procedural Thriller
- Written by: Han Jung-hoon (season 1-2); Yang Jin-ah (season 1); Park Hyung-jin (season 1); Lee Seung-hoon (season 2); Kang Eun-sun (season 2)
- Directed by: Kim Byung-soo (season 1); Yoo Seon-dong (season 2)
- Starring: Yeon Jung-hoon; Lee Won-jong; Lee Young-ah
- Country of origin: South Korea
- Original language: Korean
- No. of seasons: 2
- No. of episodes: 23

Production
- Producer: Lee Seung-hoon
- Cinematography: Kim Tae-seong
- Running time: 60 minutes
- Production company: CMG Chorok Stars

Original release
- Network: OCN
- Release: October 2, 2011 – November 18, 2012

Related
- The Vampire Detective

Vampire Prosecutor (Korean: 뱀파이어 검사; RR: Baempaieo geomsa) is a South Korean television series, starring Yeon Jung-hoon, Lee Won-jong, Lee Young-ah and Kim Joo-young. The crime procedural drama tells the story of a prosecutor who hides his identity of being a vampire and solves crimes with his special powers.

The first season aired on cable channel OCN from October 2 to December 18, 2011 on Sundays at 23:00 for 12 episodes.

The second season aired on OCN from September 9 to November 18, 2012 on Sundays at 23:00 for 11 episodes.

== Series overview ==
Season	Episodes	Originally released		Time slot
Season	Episodes	First released	Last released	Time slot
1	12	October 2, 2011	December 18, 2011	Sundays at 23:00 (KST)
2	11	September 9, 2012	November 18, 2012	Sundays at 23:00 (KST)

== Synopsis ==
Min Tae-yeon is a respected prosecutor who gets bitten and becomes a vampire. His strong sense of justice and aloof personality is shaped by his own painful past. He drinks the blood of the deceased victim, even though it causes him physical pain, in order to find out what happened to them and bring the perpetrator to justice. His close associate Detective Hwang Soon-bom is the only member of the team who knows about his secret.

== Season 1 ==
=== Cast ===
==== Main characters ====
- Yeon Jung-hoon as Min Tae-yeon, prosecutor
- Lee Young-ah as Yoo Jung-in, prosecutor
- Lee Won-jong as Hwang Soon-bom, detective
- Kim Joo-young as Choi Dong-man, intern forensic scientist

==== Supporting characters ====
- Jang Hyun-sung as Jang Chul-oh, chief prosecutor and Min's boss
- Park Jae-hoon as Bartender/Ra Jae-wook
- Kim Ye-jin as Soo-hee, coroner
- Kim Eung-soo as Yoo Won-kook
- Min Woo-hyuk as Kim Jin-ha
- Oh Hee-joon as Lee Seung-hak

==== Guest appearances ====
- Gong Jung-hwan as Park Hoon (ep 1, 10)
- Choi Yong-min as President Gum (ep 1, 2)
- Lee Ah-jin (ep 3)
- Song Min-jung as Seo Ji-yeon (ep 2)
- Seo Woo-jin as Oh Min-ho (ep 3)
- Choi Min as Nam Gun-wook (ep 4)
- Jang Young-nam as Yoon Ji-hee (ep 4, 8, 11)
- Jo Jung-eun as Park Hyun-joo (ep 5)
- Kim Ye-ryeong as Hyun-joo's mother (ep 5)
- Yoon Gi-won as Choi Wook (ep 7)
- Jung Da-hye as Yoon Se-hwa (ep 8)
- Jung Eui-chul as Min Jung-woo (ep 8)
- Lee Jong-hyuk as Prosecutor Jin (ep 8)
- Kim Hyun-sung as Lee Jung-moon (ep 12)
- Jang Gwang as Kwak No-seung
- Kim Hyo-sun
- Kim Jong-kook

=== Ratings ===
Episode	Original airdate	Title	AGB Nielsen
Episode	Original airdate	Title	Average rating
1	October 2, 2011	The Room with the French Dolls	2.05%
2	October 9, 2011	Death Scene	2.82%
3	October 16, 2011	Memories of a Rapist	2.70%
4	October 23, 2011	Trauma	2.87%
5	October 30, 2011	Truth Game	2.70%
6	November 6, 2011	Fight Club	3.30%
7	November 13, 2011	Syndrome	2.758%
8	November 20, 2011	Moon	3.82%
9	November 27, 2011	Good Friends	3.20%
10	December 4, 2011	Marriage	4.00%
11	December 11, 2011	Finale, Part 1	3.02%
12	December 18, 2011	Finale, Part 2	4.30%
Average			3.12%

== Season 2 ==
=== Cast ===
==== Main characters ====
- Yeon Jung-hoon as Min Tae-yeon
- Lee Young-ah as Yoo Jung-in
- Lee Won-jong as Hwang Soon-bom
- Lee Geung-young as Jo Jung-hyun, coroner
- Kim Joo-young as Choi Dong-man
- Kwon Hyun-sang as L

==== Supporting characters ====
- Gong Jung-hwan as Park Hoon/Kim Sung-hoon
- Park Jae-hoon as Ra Jae-wook
- Kim Bo-young as Joo Hyun-ah, chief prosecutor
- Yuriko Yoshitaka as Luna
- Kim Ji-young as Lee Ji-ae
- Seo Soo-min as Jo Hye-in

==== Guest appearances ====
- Kim Jong-gu as Heo Hak-beom (ep 1)
- Song Ji-hyun as Oh Min-young (ep 2)
- Kim In-seo as Bae Ji-yeon (ep 2)
- Jeon Hee-soo as young Ji-yeon (ep 2)
- Lee Ji-oh as young Jo Jung-hyun (ep 3)
- Hong Seok-cheon as Gabriel Jang (ep 6)
- Han Seol-ah as Han Mina (ep 6)
- Shim Yi-young as Park Hae-ri (ep 7)
- Kim Dong-hyun as killer (ep 7)
- Kim Hyun-sook as Lee Young-ae (ep 8)†
- Yoo Hyung-kwan as Yoo Hyung-kwan (ep 8)†
- Jung Ji-soon as Jung Ji-soon (ep 8)†
- Im Seo-yeon as Byun Ji-won (ep 8)†
- Yoon Seo-hyun as Yoon Seo-hyun (ep 8)†
- Jang Hyun-sung as Jang Chul-oh (ep 10)

†Denotes crossover characters from Rude Miss Young-ae.

=== Ratings ===
Episode	Original airdate	Title	AGB Nielsen
Episode	Original airdate	Title	Average rating
1	September 9, 2012	The History of Violence	1.86%
2	September 16, 2012	Good Luck	2.21%
3	September 23, 2012	Any Justice	1.91%
4	September 30, 2012	Interview with a Vampire	
5	October 7, 2012	Trap	1.61%
6	October 14, 2012	Models	1.17%
7	October 21, 2012	Stalker	1.40%
8	October 28, 2012	Rude Tae-yeon	1.70%
9	November 4, 2012	Cold Blood vs. Bad Blood	
10	November 11, 2012	Birth of a Devil	
11	November 18, 2012	Return of the Vampire	1.70%
Average			

== Reception ==
In its first season, the series topped its time-slot for 11 consecutive weeks, and recorded a peak viewership rating of 4.3%, the highest for a Korean cable drama in 2011.

It was exported to several foreign countries, including Japan, where it aired on cable channel BS-TBS.

== See also ==
- The Vampire Detective (spin-off)
- List of vampire television series
