= Iljimae =

South Korean period-action television series

- Promotional poster
- Also known as: Iljimae: The Phantom Thief
- Hangul: 일지매
- Hanja: 一枝梅
- RR: Iljimae
- MR: Iljimae
- Genre: Historical; Action; Romance
- Based on: Iljimae by Ko Woo-young
- Written by: Choi Ran
- Directed by: Lee Yong-suk
- Starring: Lee Joon-gi; Park Si-hoo; Han Hyo-joo; Lee Young-ah
- Music by: Ryo Yoshimata; Park Ki-heon; Won Ho-kyung
- Country of origin: South Korea
- Original language: Korean
- No. of episodes: 20

Production
- Executive producer: Lee Hyun-jik
- Producers: Kim Ki-beom; Kim Gwang-il
- Production location: Korea
- Running time: 60 minutes
- Production company: Chorokbaem Media

Original release
- Network: SBS TV
- Release: May 21 – July 24, 2008

Related
- The Return of Iljimae; The Vigilantes in Masks

Iljimae (Korean: 일지매; lit. 'One blossom branch') is a 2008 South Korean period-action television series, starring Lee Joon-gi in the title role of Iljimae. It is an original story based on the Korean folk hero and gentleman thief "Iljimae" from the Joseon era.

It was directed by Lee Yong-suk, and produced by Chorokbaem Media. It aired on SBS TV from May 21 to July 24, 2008 on Wednesdays and Thursdays at 21:55 (KST) for 20 episodes.

== Synopsis ==
The story takes place in Joseon, around 1633. Lee Gyeom (Lee Joon-gi) is the son of the virtuous nobleman Lee Won-ho, who is the king's trustworthy supporter and brother, and a central member of the secret organization Cheonwoohoe, composed of other five important nobles with the king as their leader. When a blind fortune teller, looking at Lee Won-ho's home, refers to the king that he sees a person as bright as the sun who would be adored by the people, the king killed Lee Won-ho as he believed that 'two suns cannot exist on the same sky'. Gyeom, from the inside of a safe, manages to survive and witnesses the murder; later, when he is forced to throw a rock at his mother's head to prove that he isn't her son, he loses his memory for the shock and is adopted by a retired thief, Soe-dol, who renames him "Yong-i". Thirteen years later, Yong-i regains his memories and begins to search for his older sister Yeon, only to see her being sentenced and hanged.

The murder of his older sister leaves Gyeom seeking revenge and, with the emblem on the killer's sword he remembers from thirteen years ago as his only clue, he swears to avenge his family. To find the sword and its owner, he disguises himself as the mysterious, black-swathed thief Iljimae, who breaks into the nobles' estates the members of the secret organization, Cheonwoohoe. Meanwhile, he also helps the people with injustices, becoming a hero. At the scene of each robbery, he leaves a handkerchief portraying a branch of red plum blossoms, symbol of the house where he lived and of his childhood memories: the very name of Iljimae reflects this, as "il" means "one", "ji" means "branch" and "mae" means "plum tree". The king and the nobility try to catch Iljimae and find his identity, especially the guard Byeon Si-hoo, who sees this as an opportunity to redeem himself from his life of misery and become a noble. In the meantime, Yong-i falls in love with Eun-chae (Han Hyo-joo), daughter of nobleman Byeon Shik and Si-hoo's stepsister, who can't forget her first love Lee Gyeom.

== Cast ==
=== Main ===
- Lee Joon-gi as Lee Gyeom / Yong-i / Iljimae
  - Yeo Jin-goo as child Lee Gyeom

A no-good, lazy gangster by day, and a mysterious thief who protects the citizens in the dark.

- Park Si-hoo as Cha-dol / Byeon Si-hoo
  - Lee David as child Cha-dol

Once a poor boy, he was told at the age of nine that his real father was magistrate Byeon Shik and was sent to live with him, becoming a royal guard. However, his real father is actually Lee Won-ho. His dream is to catch Iljimae so that he can finally become a nobleman.

- Han Hyo-joo as Byeon Eun-chae
  - Kim You-jung as child Byeon Eun-chae

A lovely and kind girl of noble birth who seems to be fated both for and against Gyeom.

- Lee Young-ah as Bong-soon
  - Jung Da-bin as child Bong-soon

A funny, silly swindler who was orphaned as a girl and is connected to Gyeom's past.

=== Supporting ===
- Lee Moon-sik as Soe-dol, Yong-i's and Cha-dol's foster father
- Kim Sung-ryung as Dan-i, Cha-dol's mother, Yong-i's foster mother
- Lee Il-hwa as Mrs Han, Gyeom's mother
- Son Tae-young as Lee Yeon, Gyeom's sister
- Jo Min-ki as Lee Won-ho, Gyeom's and Cha-dol's father
- Jung In-seo as Sumsumyi
- Ahn Gil-kang as Gong-gal, Bong-soon's foster father, ex-assassin
- Mun Ji-yun as Dae-shik, Yong-i's friend
- Kim Hyun-sung as Heung-gyeon, Yong-i's friend, shoemaker
- Jeong Jae-eun as Sim-deok, inn keeper
- Lee Won-jae as Jang Po-gyo, hunter
- Lee Won-jong as Byeon Shik, Eun-chae's and Si-wan's father, Si-hoo's foster (supposed real) father
- Kim Mu-yeol as Byeon Si-wan, Eun-chae's older brother
- Yang Jae-sung as Shim Gi-won, Lee Won-ho's friend
- Kim Roi-ha as Sa-cheon, king's assassin
- Jo Sang-ki as Mu-i, king's assassin
- Seo Dong-won as Eun-bok, hunter's son
- Do Ki-seok as Hee-bong, gang leader
- Kim Kwan-sik as Geok-doo, Heung-gyeon's father
- Jang Eun-pung as Mak-soe
- Lee Seol-goo as Kang-woo
- Kim Chang-wan as King Injo
- Noh Young-hak as Bong-soon's older brother
- Baek Seung-hyeon as Si-wan's friend
- Jin Kyung as Bong-soon's mother
- Shin Dong-woo as Gae-ddong (ep. 20)

== Production ==
Originating as a fictional character from various Ming Dynasty novels depicting a gentleman thief who leaves a plum blossom at the scene of every theft, the character of "Iljimae" became popular in Korea via the importation of Chinese novels during the Joseon period and became known as a folk hero. The character has since inspired many variants in pop culture, generally depicting Iljimae as a noble outlaw who helps the oppressed. The character was further popularized by a 1975 comic strip by Koo Woo-young featuring him as the title character, but due to the adaptation rights for the comic being owned by MBC, SBS opted to create an original story for the character instead.

Lee is the second actor to play the hero in Korean live-action media following Jang Dong-gun in 1993.

== Ratings ==
Ep.	Original broadcast date	Average audience share			
Ep.	Original broadcast date	Nielsen Korea		TNmS	
Ep.	Original broadcast date	Nationwide	Seoul	Nationwide	Seoul
1	May 21, 2008	15.5%	17.0%	14.8%	15.4%
2	May 22, 2008	17.7%	18.4%	17.6%	17.8%
3	May 28, 2008	17.1%	18.0%	19.0%	19.1%
4	May 29, 2008	19.9%	20.3%	18.9%	18.9%
5	June 4, 2008	18.6%	17.9%	19.3%	20.5%
6	June 5, 2008	19.6%	18.6%	18.6%	18.4%
7	June 11, 2008	20.0%	19.5%	20.5%	20.7%
8	June 12, 2008	20.9%	21.0%	23.0%	23.3%
9	June 18, 2008	22.4%	22.8%	24.6%	25.0%
10	June 19, 2008	21.7%	21.6%	23.1%	22.4%
11	June 25, 2008	20.7%	20.3%	22.6%	22.6%
12	June 26, 2008	24.1%	23.9%	24.6%	24.0%
13	July 2, 2008	22.0%	21.5%	25.3%	25.0%
14	July 3, 2008	22.2%	21.4%	25.4%	24.6%
15	July 9, 2008	23.0%	23.4%	26.0%	26.1%
16	July 10, 2008	24.4%	24.3%	27.6%	28.2%
17	July 16, 2008	24.0%	23.6%	28.0%	29.3%
18	July 17, 2008	24.2%	24.0%	27.8%	28.1%
19	July 23, 2008	25.0%	25.1%	27.1%	26.8%
20	July 24, 2008	27.9%	28.4%	31.0%	31.4%
Average		23.2%	23.4%	21.5%	21.6%

== Awards and nominations ==
Year	Award	Category	Recipient	Result
2008	SBS Drama Awards	Top Excellence Award, Actor	Lee Joon-gi	Won
2008	SBS Drama Awards	Excellence Award, Actress in a Drama Special	Lee Young-ah	Nominated
2008	SBS Drama Awards	Best Supporting Actor in a Drama Special	Ahn Gil-kang	Nominated
2008	SBS Drama Awards	Best Supporting Actor in a Drama Special	Lee Moon-sik	Won
2008	SBS Drama Awards	Best Supporting Actress in a Drama Special	Kim Sung-ryung	Nominated
2008	SBS Drama Awards	New Star Award	Han Hyo-joo	Won
2008	SBS Drama Awards	Best Young Actor	Yeo Jin-goo	Won
2008	SBS Drama Awards	Top 10 Stars	Lee Joon-gi	Won
2008	SBS Drama Awards	Netizen Popularity Award	Lee Joon-gi	Won
2008	SBS Drama Awards	Friendship Award	Do Ki-seok	Won
2009	45th Baeksang Arts Awards	Best Actor (TV)	Lee Joon-gi	Nominated

== International broadcast ==
- So-net TV began broadcasting the series in Japan on 24 November 2008. Reruns aired on terrestrial channel TV Tokyo from 15 June to 24 August 2009, and Mnet Japan starting 25 August 2009.
- It aired in Thailand on Channel 3 from December 4, 2009 to February 19, 2010.
- It also aired in Nigeria on government owned ITN channel from 2016 year end.
