= Kim Sung-eun (actress, born 1983) =

South Korean actress (born 1983)

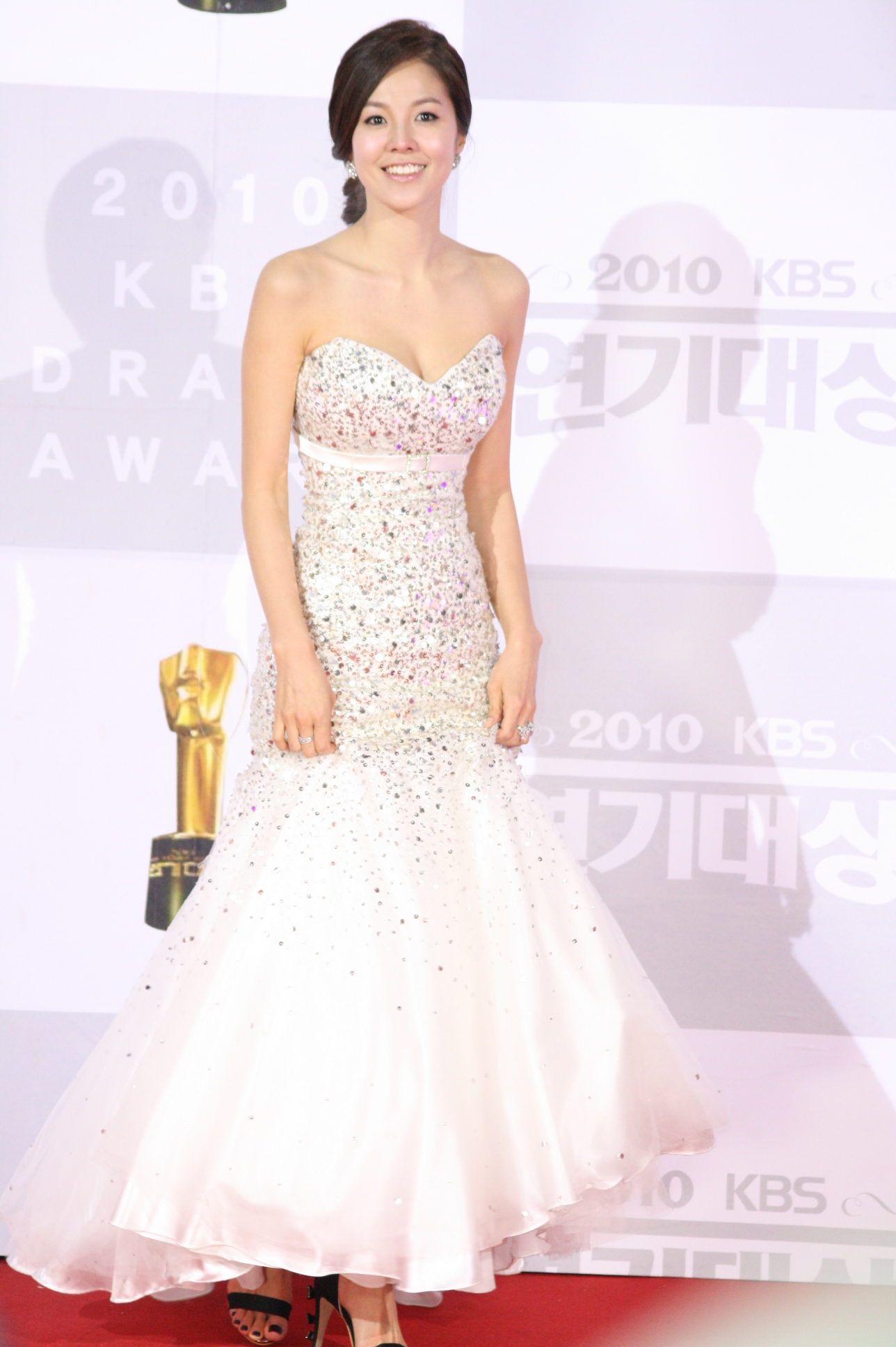
- Kim at 2010 KBS Drama Awards
- Born: September 16, 1983 (age 43); South Korea
- Education: Sejong University – Bachelor of Film Art
- Occupation: Actress
- Years active: 1999–present
- Agent: Mystic89
- Spouse: Jung Jo-gook (m. 2009)
- Children: 3

Korean name
- Hangul: 김성은
- RR: Gim Seongeun
- MR: Kim Sŏngŭn

Kim Sung-eun (Korean: 김성은; born September 16, 1983) is a South Korean actress.

== Filmography ==
=== Film ===
Year	Title	Role	Notes
2007	Magang Hotel	Park Min-ah	
2013	My Little Hero	show host	cameo
2013	Queen of the Night	Ji-eun	cameo
2017	Part-Time Spy	Eun-jung	
2018	Notebook from My Mother	Soo-jin	

=== Television series ===
Year	Title	Role	Notes/Ref.
1999–2000	Burnt Rice Teacher and Seven Potatoes	Go Cha-soon	
2002	New Nonstop		episode 399 ("Chicken Run" part) episode 405 ("Let's Exercise" part)
2002–2003	Shoot for the Stars		
2003	Wife	Han Sang-ho's lover	
2003	Scent of a Man		
2003	Swan Lake	Shin Se-hee	
2003–2004	Detectives		
2004	Good Morning Gong-ja	Kim Sung-eun	
2005	Three Leaf Clover	Kim Ji-hyun	
2005	Wind Flower	Shin Jung-nim	
2005–2006	Bizarre Bunch	Lee Hae-in	
2007	Thank You	Seo Eun-hee	
2007	Catching Up with Gangnam Moms	Han Soo-jin	
2007	Drama City: "Catch the Sumac"	Soo-ji	one act-drama
2008	Who Are You?	Yoon Ha-young	
2008	Cooking Up Romance	Kang Hye-kyung	
2009	Hometown of Legends: "Forbidden Book"	Hyun-deok	
2009–2010	Life is Good	Na Ye-joo	
2011	KBS Drama Special: "That Man is There"	Seo Joon-hee	one act-drama
2012	Still You	Shin Na-ra	
2023	King the Land	a senior flight attendant of King Air	Cameo (episode 1)

=== Television shows ===
Year	Title	Notes/Ref.
2007 – 2009	Happy Sunday – Immortal Songs	Host (with Shin Jung-hwan and Tak Jae-hoon)
2008	Music Bank	Host (with Tablo)
2012 – 2014	Tasty Road	MC (with Park Soo-jin)
2013	Story on Woman Show	
2014	Beauty Expedition	Cast member
2016	Real Men – Female Special	Cast member (season 4)
2021	Literacy Kindergarten	Host
2022	People of the Health Office	Host
2022	Oh Eun-young's Golden Counseling Center	Special Host
2023	Look at Me+	Host with Jeong Yu-mi

== Commercial advertisements ==
Brand	Product
Radepangs	Glasses
Korea Yakult	Puyo Soda
Saehan Group	Basic Elite
Korea Johnson & Johnson	Clean & Clear
Crown Bakery	
Kia	
KTF	001 Blue
Ottogi	1/2 Half Mayo
Kolon Pharmaceuticals	Bicogreen
Nongshim	Hooroorook Noodles
Samsung Electronics	Smart Camera NX2000
Oster	Oster MyBlend
Yuhan Kimberly	Green Fingers Natural Moisturizing
Won & Won	Won Grandma Bossam
Lotteria	T.G.I Fridays
DeliFarm	Loacker
Dongsuh Foods	Philadelphia Cream Cheese

== Awards and nominations ==
Year	Award	Category	Nominated work	Result
2007	6th KBS Entertainment Awards	Top Entertainer Award	Immortal Songs	Won
2009	23rd KBS Drama Awards	Best Actress in a One-Act/Special/Short Drama	Hometown of Legends - Forbidden Book	Won
