= Birth of a Man =

Birth Of a Man
- 男子 Born: Birth Of a Man
- Directed by: Park Hee-jun
- Written by: Lee Chang-yeol
- Starring: Jung Joon; Hong Kyung-in; Yeo Hyun-soo
- Edited by: Ho Kyung Min; Eum Hye Jung
- Music by: Kim Bong-soo
- Production companies: Twin Entertainment; Mega Pictures
- Release date: October 11, 2002
- Running time: 109 minutes
- Country: South Korea
- Language: Korean

Birth of a Man (Korean: 남자 태어나다; RR: Namja taeeonada) is a 2002 South Korean film starring Jung Joon, Hong Kyung-in and Yeo Hyun-soo.

== Production ==
The team was helped by a legendary Korean boxer Hong Soo-hwan regarding the boxing scenes in the film.

== Cast ==
- Jung Joon as Jang Dae-seong
- Hong Kyung-in as Lim Man-goo
- Yeo Hyun-soo as Kim Hae-sam
- Lee Won-jong
- Kim Sa-rang as Sa-rang
- Lee Jae-yong as Mr. Choi

== Plot ==
To accomplish the 99-year-old grandfather's dream of sending young people to university, three men practice boxing to enroll as a boxing student for university.

== Reception ==
The film was pulled out in a day from theaters citing low performances despite being well received by 10,000 people in its test screening. The decision to pull out only in a day was criticized, and some even made an internet community for the movie to be offered more screenings.
