= Kwon Soo-hyun (actor) =

South Korean actor

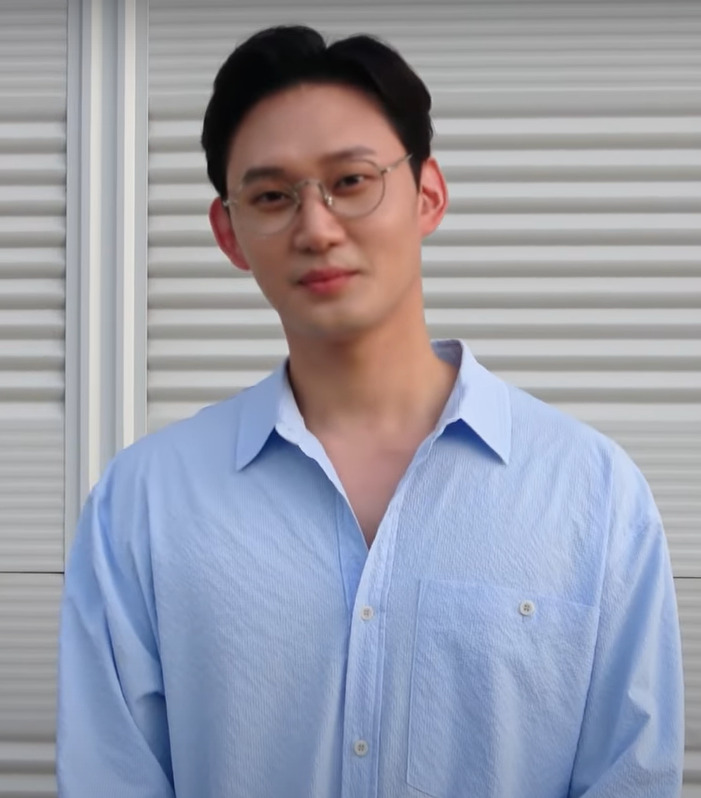
- Kwon Soo-hyun in 2021
- Born: August 18, 1986 (age 40); Jeonju, Jeollabuk-do, South Korea
- Occupation: Actor
- Years active: 2011–present
- Agent: Story J Company

Korean name
- Hangul: 권수현
- RR: Gwon Suhyeon
- MR: Kwŏn Suhyŏn

Kwon Soo-hyun (Korean: 권수현; born August 18, 1986) is a South Korean actor. He has had supporting roles in the television series Run, Jang-mi (2014), High Society (2015), and Record of Youth (2020).

== Filmography ==
=== Film ===
Year	Title	Role	Ref.
2012	Dangerously Excited	Soo	
2016	The Age of Shadows	Sun-gil	
2017	Misbehavior	Class president	
2022	Project Wolf Hunting	Criminal	

=== Television series ===
Year	Title	Role	Notes	Ref.
2014	Run, Jang-mi	Baek Jang-Soo		
2015	High Society	Lee Tae-Gun		
2016	The K2	Bodyguard		
2017	Queen of Mystery	Ha Wan-Seung [Young]		
2017	Drama Stage – Assistant Manager Park's Private Life	Kim gyeong-soo	one act-drama	
2018	The Smile Has Left Your Eyes	Eum Cho-rong		
2018	Top Management	Jay Love		
2019	Abyss	Seo Ji-wook		
2020	Kkondae Intern	[Ka Yeol Chan's friend]	Cameo (Ep.1)	
2020	Record of Youth	Kim Jin-Woo		
2021	Drama Stage – Love Spoiler	Kim Yeong-hoon	one act-drama	
2021	Move to Heaven	Jeong Soo-hyun	Cameo (Ep.5)	
2021	Doom at Your Service	Dong-kyung's date	Cameo (Ep.6)	
2021	Crime Puzzle	Cha Seung-jae		
2022	Café Minamdang	Cha Do-won		
2025	Buried Hearts	Yeom Hee-chul		
2026	Bloody Flower	Chae Jung-Su		

== Awards ==
Year	Award	Category	Nominated work
2016	24th Korean Culture and Entertainment Awards	Rookie award (Film)	The Age of Shadows
