= Run, Jang-mi =

2014–2015 South Korean television series

- Promotional poster
- Also known as: Run, Rose; Way to Go, Rose
- Hangul: 달려라 장미
- RR: Dallyeora Jangmi
- MR: Tallyŏra Changmi
- Genre: Melodrama, romance, family
- Written by: Kim Young-in
- Directed by: Hong Chang-wook
- Starring: Go Joo-won; Lee Young-ah
- Country of origin: South Korea
- Original language: Korean
- No. of episodes: 123

Production
- Executive producer: Moon Bo-mi
- Running time: Mondays to Fridays at 19:20 (KST)
- Production company: HB Entertainment

Original release
- Network: Seoul Broadcasting System
- Release: 15 December 2014 – 5 June 2015

Run, Jang-mi (Korean: 달려라 장미) is a 2014 South Korean daily drama starring Go Joo-won and Lee Young-ah. It aired on SBS on Mondays to Fridays at 19:20 for 123 episodes from December 15, 2014 to June 5, 2015.

== Plot ==
Baek Jang-mi (Lee Young-ah) was brought up in a wealthy family. On the day she marries Kang Min-chul (Jung Joon), her father dies suddenly. The family business is in financial problem and goes bankrupt. When Min-chul realizes that the Baek's family is in debt, he refuses to honour the marriage and breaks up with Jang-mi.

Jang-mi struggles to make a living, but soon finds a job in a rice cake shop. There she meets Hwang Tae-ja (Go Joo-won), the grandson of a food company president. At first they loggerheads with each other, they soon develop feelings for each other.

== Cast ==
=== Main characters ===
- Go Joo-won as Hwang Tae-ja
- Lee Young-ah as Baek Jang-mi
- Ryu Jin as Jang Joon-hyuk
- Jung Joon as Kang Min-chul
- Yoon Joo-hee as Kang Min-joo
- Lee Si-won as Hwang Tae-hee

=== Supporting characters ===
- Yoon Yoo-sun as Na Yeon-joo
- Kwon Soo-hyun as Baek Jang-soo
- Jeon Gook-hwan as company president Hwang
- Jung Ae-ri as Madam Hong
- Kim Chung as Professor Choi
- Lee Sang-woo as Teacher Kang
- Lee Dae-yeon as Jang Myung-moon
- Kim Hyung-beom as Bong Ma-bong

== Awards and nominations ==
Year	Award	Category	Recipient	Result
2015	SBS Drama Awards	Excellence Award, Actor in a Serial Drama	Go Joo-won	Nominated
2015	SBS Drama Awards	Excellence Award, Actress in a Serial Drama	Lee Young-ah	Nominated
