= Bread, Love and Dreams (TV series) =

2010 South Korean drama television series

- Promotional poster
- Also known as: The Baker King
- Hangul: 제빵왕 김탁구
- Hanja: 製빵王 金卓求
- Lit.: King of Baking, Kim Tak-gu
- RR: Jeppangwang Gim Takgu
- MR: Cheppangwang Kim T'akku
- Genre: Romance
- Created by: Kwak Ki-won; Jeong Sung-hyo; KBS Production
- Written by: Kang Eun-kyung
- Directed by: Lee Jung-sub
- Starring: Yoon Shi-yoon; Joo Won; Eugene; Lee Young-ah
- Composer: Lee Pil-ho
- Country of origin: South Korea
- Original language: Korean
- No. of episodes: 30

Production
- Executive producer: Jeong Hae-ryeong (KBS)
- Producers: Ahn Jae-hyun; Shin Sang-yoon
- Running time: 60 minutes
- Production company: Samhwa Networks

Original release
- Network: KBS2
- Release: June 9 – September 16, 2010

Related
- Baker King

Bread, Love and Dreams (Korean: 제빵왕 김탁구) is a 2010 South Korean television drama starring Yoon Shi-yoon, Joo Won, Eugene, and Lee Young-ah. It tells the story of how a determined young baker overcomes many trials towards his goal of becoming the best baker in Korea. This series takes place in the 1970s to 1990s, starting after his conception and finishing when he reaches his mid-20s. It aired on KBS2 from June 9 to September 16, 2010, on Wednesday and Thursday at 22:00 (KST) for 30 episodes.

The series was one of the most watched shows in South Korea in 2010, with a final episode viewership rating of 50.9% and becoming the 25th highest rated drama of all time. It is considered the breakout role of lead actor Yoon Shi-yoon, catapulting him to immense popularity as well as receiving much praise for his sincere acting.

== Synopsis ==
Kim Tak-gu (Yoon Shi-yoon) is the eldest son of Gu Il-jong, the chairman of Geosung Foods Enterprise, and Kim Mi-sun, his mistress. The chairman's wife, In-sook, is furious with her husband and shuns Tak-gu. When his mother is kidnapped, Tak-gu runs away from home and spends the next 12 years looking for her.

In his journey, he enters a baking school owned by Pal-bong who is a legend in the baking industry. Coincidentally, he was also Tak-gu's father's teacher. In said school, Tak-gu also finds Jo Jin-goo, the man who kidnapped his mother. Jo Jin-goo tells Tak-gu that his mother accidentally fell off a cliff. Tak-gu decides to stay at the bakery and learn the art of making bread, like his father did before him. Gu Ma-jun (Joo Won), Tak-gu's half-brother, is also at the school, hoping to learn baking to win his father's approval and take over the family business. He lives under an assumed name and never reveals his true identity. Ma-jun still nurses a hatred for Tak-gu from their childhood.

It is later revealed that Tak-gu's mom is not dead and that she is looking for him. The chairman, who also spent the past 14 years looking for Tak-gu, eventually finds out that he is at the bakery and is furious at Ma-jun for not telling him. The chairman wants Tak-gu, his eldest son, to take over the family business instead of Ma-jun. Rejected, Ma-jun plots to steal Tak-gu's childhood friend, Shin Yoo-kyung (Eugene), and embarrass his family in the process. Tak-gu eventually finds his mother, but In-sook and her lover, Han (the chairman's assistant), plot to rob Tak-gu of his inheritance to let Ma-jun take the chairman's position. When the chairman finds out, Han attempts to murder Tak-gu, but Tak-gu is saved by Jo Jin-goo. Meanwhile, Ma-jun's plan to embarrass his family works, but it doesn't give him the satisfaction he expects. He reaches a truce with Tak-gu and the two agree to let their older sister, Gu Ja-kyung, run the company. The show ends with Tak-gu continuing to work at the bakery with his girlfriend, Yang Mi-sun (Lee Young-ah), while Ma-jun decides to travel around the world with his new bride, Shin Yoo-kyung. Manager Han is imprisoned and the chairman is happy that at last, his loved ones found happiness.

== Cast ==
=== Main ===
- Yoon Shi-yoon as Kim Tak-gu
  - Oh Jae-moo as young Kim Tak-gu
- Joo Won as Gu Ma-jun / Seo Tae-jo
  - Shin Dong-woo as young Gu Ma-jun
- Eugene as Shin Yoo-kyung
  - Jo Jung-eun as young Shin Yoo-kyung
- Lee Young-ah as Yang Mi-sun

=== Supporting ===
==== Gu family ====
- Jun Kwang-ryul as Gu Il-jong
- Jeon In-hwa as Seo In-sook
- Choi Ja-hye as Gu Ja-kyung
  - Ha Seung-ri as teenage Gu Ja-kyung
  - Kang Ye-seo as young Gu Ja-Kyung
- Choi Yoon-young as Gu Ja-rim
  - Kim So-hyun as young Gu Ja-rim

==== Yang family ====
- Jang Hang-sun as Pal-bong (Yang Mi-sun's grandfather)
- Park Sang-myun as Yang In-mok (Yang Mi-sun's father)
- Hwang Mi-sun as Oh Young-ja (Yang Mi-sun's mother)

==== Others ====
- Jung Sung-mo as Han Seung-jae
- Park Sung-woong as Jo Jin-goo
- Lee Han-wi as Heo Gab-soo
- Jeon Mi-seon as Kim Mi-sun
- Jung Hye-sun as Madam Hong (Grandmother)
- Kwon Yong-woon as Shin Bae (Yoo-kyung's father)
- Park Yong-jin as Go Jae-bok

== Reception ==
Bread, Love and Dreams was well-received in South Korea, receiving a record viewer rating of 50.8%. Audiences were attached to the show because of its underdog vs. society theme. Naver listed it as the most searched for item in South Korea of 2010.

On December 20, 2010, the series received presidential honors in a ceremony that thanked cultural content producers for their achievements.

=== Ratings ===
Ep.	Original broadcast date	Average audience share			
Ep.	Original broadcast date	Nielsen Korea		TNmS	
Ep.	Original broadcast date	Nationwide	Seoul	Nationwide	Seoul
1	June 9, 2010	13.8%	N/A	16.3%	14.2%
2	June 10, 2010	14.4%	14.5%	16.9%	18.4%
3	June 16, 2010	26.4%	28.3%	28.5%	29.1%
4	June 17, 2010	24.2%	26.3%	25.3%	26.4%
5	June 23, 2010	27.1%	28.4%	28.5%	28.50%
6	June 24, 2010	31.1%	31.8%	32.2%	32.5%
7	June 30, 2010	31.0%	32.2%	33.4%	33.6%
8	July 1, 2010	31.6%	30.8%	35.8%	35.9%
9	July 7, 2010	33.4%	34.7%	38.1%	38.6%
10	July 8, 2010	33.0%	33.8%	34.5%	34.9%
11	July 14, 2010	34.1%	34.0%	35.9%	35.2%
12	July 15, 2010	35.3%	35.2%	36.9%	36.1%
13	July 21, 2010	37.3%	37.0%	38.5%	37.7%
14	July 22, 2010	37.9%	38.2%	38.4%	36.5%
15	July 28, 2010	36.6%	35.7%	39.7%	39.2%
16	July 29, 2010	37.9%	38.1%	39.9%	38.6%
17	August 4, 2010	39.5%	39.8%	42.5%	42.3%
18	August 5, 2010	40.5%	40.2%	44.4%	44.0%
19	August 11, 2010	42.3%	42.4%	44.9%	44.0%
20	August 12, 2010	42.6%	43.9%	44.6%	43.8%
21	August 18, 2010	41.9%	42.4%	44.0%	42.6%
22	August 19, 2010	42.3%	41.9%	43.7%	42.9%
23	August 25, 2010	43.6%	44.6%	44.1%	44.1%
24	August 26, 2010	41.9%	41.9%	44.7%	44.2%
25	September 1, 2010	44.0%	44.4%	45.8%	44.9%
26	September 2, 2010	45.0%	46.1%	48.4%	47.2%
27	September 8, 2010	43.3%	43.2%	47.5%	47.0%
28	September 9, 2010	44.7%	44.5%	48.2%	46.4%
29	September 15, 2010	45.3%	44.2%	46.5%	45.5%
30	September 16, 2010	49.3%	48.3%	50.8%	49.7%
Average		36.4%	36.7%	38.6%	32.2%
In the table above, the blue numbers represent the lowest ratings and the red numbers represent the highest ratings.
