= Bizarre Bunch =

South Korean television series

- Promotional poster
- Also known as: Peculiar Man, Eccentric Woman; Bizarre Family; Odd Man and Woman
- Hangul: 별난여자 별난남자
- Hanja: 別난女子 別난男子
- RR: Byeollan yeoja byeollan namja
- MR: Pyŏllan yŏja pyŏllan namja
- Starring: Jung Joon; Go Joo-won; Kim Ah-joong; Kim Sung-eun
- Country of origin: South Korea
- Original language: Korean
- No. of episodes: 170

Original release
- Network: KBS1
- Release: September 26, 2005 – May 19, 2006

Bizarre Bunch (Korean: 별난여자 별난남자) is a South Korean television series. The series is also known in English as Peculiar Man, Eccentric Woman, Bizarre Family and Odd Man and Woman.

== Synopsis ==
The story follows an extended family's love dilemmas, family arguments and family secrets.

== Production ==
The series was produced by Lee Duk-gun and ran for 170 episodes. It was broadcast in South Korea from September 26, 2005, to May 19, 2006.

== Cast ==
- Jung Joon
- Kang In-duk
- Kim Ah-joong
- Kim Sung-eun
- Kim Hae-sook
- Kim Young-ok
- Go Joo-won
- Sun Ji-hyun

== See also ==
- Korean drama
- List of South Korean television series
