= Yeo Hyun-soo =

South Korean actor (born 1982)

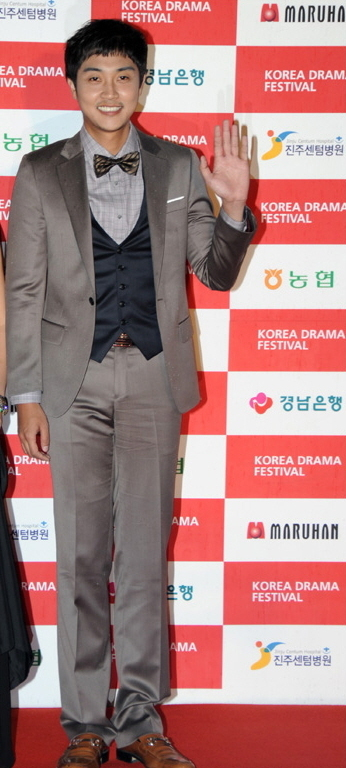
- Yeo in 2010
- Born: September 21, 1982 (age 44); South Korea
- Education: Chung-Ang University - Theater and Film
- Occupation: Actor
- Years active: 1999–present
- Agent: All Round Entertainment
- Spouse: Jeong Ha-yun

Korean name
- Hangul: 여현수
- RR: Yeo Hyeonsu
- MR: Yŏ Hyŏnsu

Yeo Hyun-soo (born September 21, 1982) is a South Korean actor.

== Filmography ==
=== Film ===
Year	Title	Role
2001	Bungee Jumping of Their Own	Im Hyun-bin
2002	Birth of a Man	Kim Hae-sam
2005	Holiday	Choi Min-seok
2006	To Sir, with Love	Lee Se-ho
2010	A Lone Tree	Kang Seok-woo
2012	The Strangers	Seok-yi
2013	Playboy Bong	Male hero

=== Television series ===
Year	Title	Role	Network
1999	Hur Jun	Kim Sang-hwa	MBC
2000	Bad Friends		MBC
2000	Nonstop		MBC
2001	Hotelier		MBC
2001	Drama City: "Thanks To"	Jin-young	KBS2
2002	Reservation for Love	Park Sung-jin	MBC
2002	Five Brothers and Sisters	Han Ho-sik	SBS
2002	Age of Innocence	Min-soo	SBS
2003	Save the Last Dance for Me	Yeo Hyun-soo	MBC
2003	A River Flows Through Everyone's Heart	Seung-hwan	KBS1
2003	Lovers	Yoo Ji-sup	SBS
2004	Traveling Women	Jin Byung-tae	SBS
2006	MBC Best Theater: "Elvis"	Lee Byung-soo	MBC
2010	Dong Yi	Ge Dwo-ra	MBC
2010	Ang Shim Jung	Kang Ye-rang	E Channel
2011	Dangerous Woman	Kang Dong-min	MBC
2011	Servant, The Untold Story of Bang-ja	Lee Mong-ryong	Channel CGV

=== Variety show ===
Year	Title
2013	Human Theater
2014	Please Look After Mom

== Awards ==
Year	Award	Category	Nominated work
2001	37th Baeksang Arts Awards	Best New Actor	Bungee Jumping of Their Own
