= Jung Joon =

South Korean actor

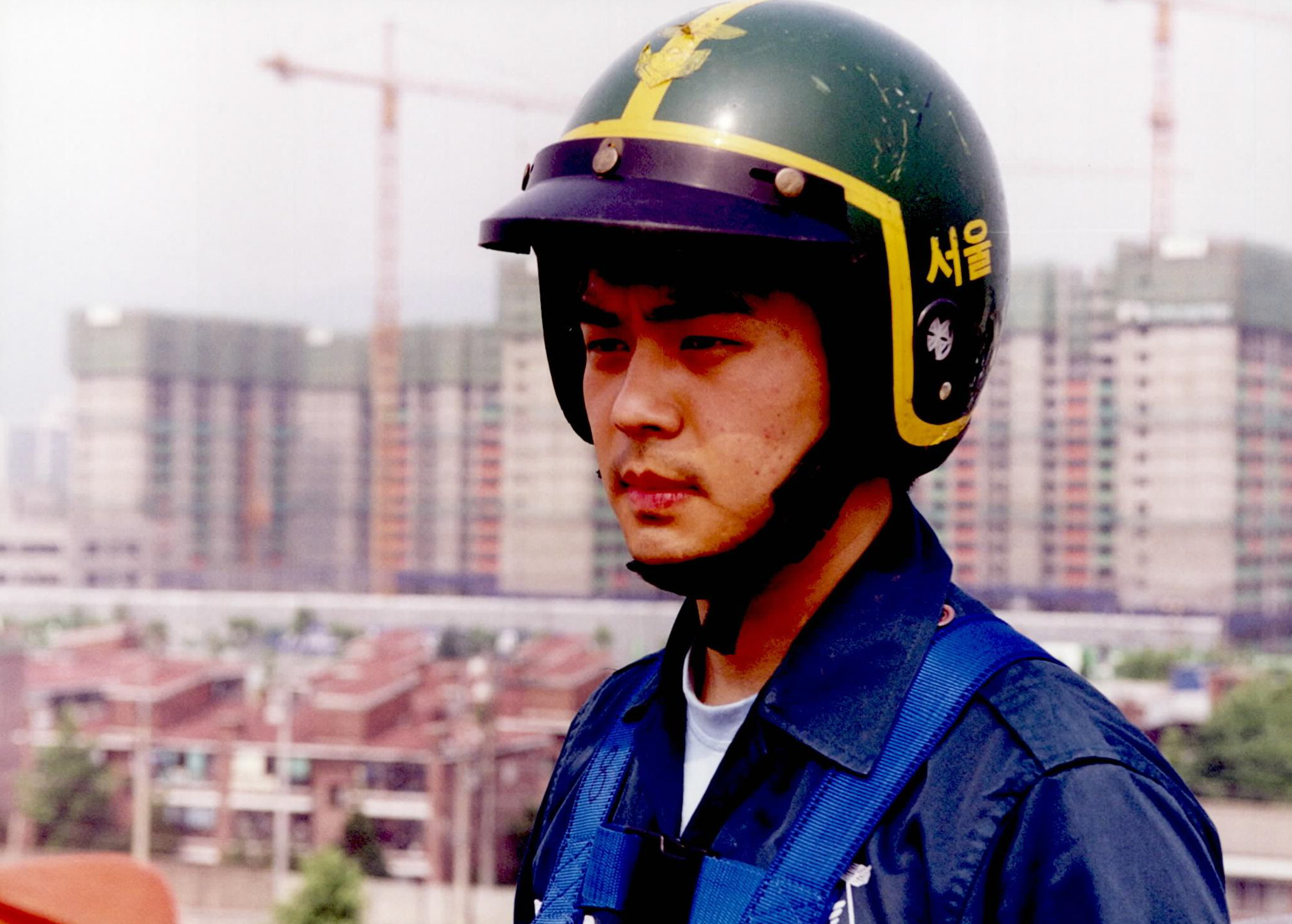
- Born: March 6, 1979 (age 47); Goyang, Gyeonggi Province, South Korea
- Occupation: Actor
- Years active: 1991–present
- Agent: Polaris Entertainment

Korean name
- Hangul: 정준
- Hanja: 鄭俊
- RR: Jeong Jun
- MR: Chŏng Chun

Jung Joon (born March 6, 1979) is a South Korean actor. Though primarily a supporting actor, he played the leading role in the 2001 television drama Delicious Proposal and the 2006 film Blue Sky. In 2013, Jung and real-life friends Yang Dong-geun and Kim Yoo-mi starred in the documentary Black Gospel, in which they joined Korean gospel group Heritage on a month-long trip to Harlem to discover and experience the roots of gospel music.

== Filmography ==
=== Television series ===
Year	Title	Role	Network
1991	General Rainbow		KBS2
1993	The Season of Puberty	Lee Dong-min	MBC
1995	LA Arirang	Jung Joon	SBS
1995	Men of the Bathhouse	Kim Ji-hwan	KBS2
1996	Im Kkeok-jeong	Im Baek-son	SBS
1998	Love	Gu-tak	MBC
1999	Love in 3 Colors	Kang Hyun-do	KBS2
2000	Popcorn	Yoon Chang-soo	SBS
2001	Like Father, Unlike Son	Jang Deok-gu	KBS2
2001	Delicious Proposal	Kim Hyo-dong	MBC
2003	Swan Lake	Go Eun-kyu	MBC
2004	MBC Best Theater "Your Brother Is Back"		MBC
2004	Precious Family	Lee Hyung-pyo	KBS2
2005	Bizarre Bunch	Jang Ki-woong	KBS1
2008	Don't Ask Me About the Past	Jang Joon-seok	OCN
2009	The Return of Iljimae	Kim Joon-seo	MBC
2010	Coffee House	College seonbae (cameo)	SBS
2011	City Hunter	Kim Sang-gook	SBS
2011	A Thousand Days' Promise	Cha Dong-chul	SBS
2012	Father Is Sorry	Dong-soo	TV Chosun
2012	Tasty Life	Min Tae-hyung	SBS
2012	My Kids Give Me a Headache	Ahn Dae-ki	jTBC
2014	Run, Jang-mi	Kang Min-chul	SBS

=== Film ===
Year	Title	Role
1991	Do You Like Afternoons After a Storm?	Hae-sung
1997	Change	Kang Dae-ho
1997	K.K Family List	Joon-jung
1999	The Great Chef	Taek-joong
1999	Attack the Gas Station	Geon-bbang ("Biscuit")
2000	Nightmare	Se-hun
2000	Just Do It	Jung Dae-chul
2000	Libera Me	Lee Jun-seong
2002	Birth of a Man	Jang Dae-seong
2003	Tube	Newlywed man (cameo)
2006	Blue Sky	Kim Ja-joong
2013	Black Gospel	Self/Narrator

=== Variety show ===
Year	Title	Notes
2013	Law of the Jungle in the Himalayas	Cast member
