= Delicious Proposal =

2001 South Korean television series

- Promotional poster
- Also known as: Tasty Courtship; Sweet Proposal
- Genre: Romance; Comedy; Drama
- Written by: Kim In-young
- Directed by: Park Sung-soo
- Starring: Jung Joon; Son Ye-jin; So Yoo-jin; So Ji-sub
- Country of origin: South Korea
- Original language: Korean
- No. of episodes: 16

Production
- Executive producer: Lee Eun-kyu
- Running time: 60 minutes

Original release
- Network: Munhwa Broadcasting Corporation
- Release: February 7 – March 29, 2001

Delicious Proposal (Korean: 맛있는 청혼; Hanja: 맛있는 請婚; RR: Masinneun cheonghon) is a 2001 South Korean television series starring Jung Joon, Son Ye-jin, So Yoo-jin and So Ji-sub. It aired on MBC from February 7 to March 29, 2001 on Wednesdays and Thursdays at 21:55 for 16 episodes. The drama had a peak viewership of 30.9% and an average rating of 28% throughout its run.

== Plot ==
The drama is about two families that operate rival Chinese food restaurants, and the love stories of twenty-something high school graduates on their paths to becoming first-class chefs.

Hyo-dong treats his customers like kings and serves the best Chinese food in the area, but his restaurant has been struggling for some time. Built on his father's dedication and decades of hard work, the restaurant has been declining due to the aggressive techniques of their rivals. In the midst of this competition, Hyo-dong gets to know Hee-ae, a charming young girl who frequents the same cooking class. They also meet Shin-ae, a poor, very determined student who dreams of owning her own restaurant someday. Hyo-dong falls for Hee-ae, but he later finds out that she is the daughter of the owner of deluxe eatery Golden Dragon, a ruthless rival who is out to destroy his father's restaurant.

== Cast ==
- Jung Joon as Kim Hyo-dong
- Son Ye-jin as Jang Hee-ae
- So Yoo-jin as Ma Shin-ae
- So Ji-sub as Jang Hee-moon, Hee-ae's brother
- Park Geun-hyung as Kim Kap-soo, Hyo-dong's father
- Kim Yong-gun as Jang Tae-kwang, Hee-ae's father
- Sunwoo Yong-nyeo as Hee-ae's mother
- Kim In-moon as Wang Sa-boo, chef who taught Hyo-dong's father
- Kim Kyu-chul as Park Young-guk
- Hong Soo-hyun as Hong Joo-ri, Hee-moon's friend
- Jung Won-joong as Jo Paeng-dal, Golden Dragon chef
- Lee Hye-sook as Kwon Mi-sook, Hyo-dong's aunt
- Park Kwang-jung as Yoon Chil-sung, Hyo-dong's uncle
- Kim Se-joon as master Chinese chef
- Lee Jin-woo as Shim Woo-kyung
- Ji Sung as Oh Joon-soo, Hyo-dong's friend
- Kwon Sang-woo as Choon-shik, motorcycle delivery guy
- Kim Ji-woo as Hyo-dong's sister
- Kim Yong-hee
- Seo Beom-shik
