= Brothers in Heaven =

- Theatrical poster
- Directed by: Park Hee-jun
- Screenplay by: Park Hee-jun
- Produced by: Baek Tae-whan
- Starring: Sung Hoon; Jo Han-sun; Yoon So-yi
- Release dates: November 26, 2017 (Hiroshima International Film Festival); January 17, 2018
- Running time: 114 minutes
- Country: South Korea
- Language: Korean

Brothers in Heaven (Korean: 돌아와요 부산항애), originally titled Come Back to Busan Port, is a 2017 South Korean action crime film starring Sung Hoon, Jo Han-sun and Yoon So-yi and directed by Park Hee-jun.

== Plot ==
Twin brothers who were separated soon after being orphaned as young children struggle to reconcile after many years of not knowing each other. Taeju is a police officer and Taesung is a local gang leader, but both end up being in love with the same woman. The film is set in Busan.

== Cast ==
- Sung Hoon as Tae-sung
  - Ji Min-hyuk as young Tae-sung
- Jo Han-sun as Tae-joo
- Yoon So-yi as Chan-mi
- Shin Se-hwi as young Chan-mi
- Kong Jung-hwan as Sang-doo
- Lee Ik-joon as Min-goo
- Park Chul-min as Kang-goo
- Son Byong-ho as Shane

== Production ==
The film was directed by Park Hee-jun. Although falling in the action crime genre, it also contains hidden philosophical symbols referring to religious allegories.

The working title was Come back to Busan Port, the name of a famous song by Korean singer Cho Yong-pil.

== Release ==
Brothers in Heaven had its premiere in the Special Screenings section at the Hiroshima International Film Festival in Japan on November 26, 2017, and went on general release on January 17, 2018.
