= Ang Shim Jung =

South Korean television series

- Promotional poster for Ang Shim Jung
- Hangul: 비밀기방 앙심정
- RR: Bimilgibang Angsimjeong
- MR: Pimilgibang Angsimjŏng
- Genre: Historical; Mystery
- Written by: Lee Gyu-bok
- Directed by: Choi Do-hoon
- Starring: Yeo Hyun-soo; Kim Ha-eun; Kwon Hae-hyo; Lee Ki-young
- Country of origin: South Korea
- Original language: Korean
- No. of episodes: 13

Production
- Executive producer: Lee Joo-ha
- Producer: Ji Soo-hyun
- Running time: Thursdays at 00:00 (KST)
- Production company: APPIA Studio

Original release
- Network: E Channel
- Release: October 28, 2010 – January 20, 2011

Ang Shim Jung (Korean: 비밀기방 앙심정) is a 2010 South Korean television series starring Yeo Hyun-soo, Kim Ha-eun, Kwon Hae-hyo and Lee Ki-young. It aired on E Channel from October 28, 2010, to January 20, 2011, on Thursdays at 00:00 (KST) for 13 episodes.

== Plot ==
Secret organization Twelve Zodiac Animals controls Joseon through government officials and is involved in all kinds of crimes, from corruption to murders. To stop it, the king creates the secret society Ang Shim Jung, but the Twelve Zodiac Animals succeed in stealing the throne, and Ang Shim Jung's members are forced to hide in a gibang, where they begin to develop a plan for revenge. Following the murder of her parents, noblewoman Min Chung-seol joins Ang Shim Jung, where she meets Kang Ye-rang.

== Cast ==
- Yeo Hyun-soo as Kang Ye-rang
- Kim Ha-eun as Min Chung-seol
- Kwon Hae-hyo as Yoon Geuk-gum
- Lee Ki-young as Kang Seung-won
- Kim Joo-young as Moon Ik-gyum
- Lee Ki-yeol as Kim Cheo-in
- Song Yo-sep as Kim Pan-gon
- Jung Eun-pyo as Lee Ja-chool
- Kwon Tae-ho as Min
- Kim So-won as Myo-hwa
- Ji Sang-min as Doo-ryong
- Wi Yang-ho as Oh Son
- Cha Chung-hwa as gisaeng
- Hwang Eun-jung as Hong Dan
- Park Woo-chun as Park Jung-do
- Lee Dong-hoon as Choi Dong-soon
- Jung Tong as Dol-soe
- Yoon Bae-young as Ekku
- Park Min-seok as Hwang Gyo-wi
- Kim Kyu-chul as Min Ki-chul
- Lee Se-chang as king
- Yoon Seo-hyun as Baek Joong-hak
- Lee Chul-min as Lee Myung-hwa
- Oh Jung-tae as head of the slave market
- Bae Noo-ri as Myung-wol

== Awards and nominations ==
Year	Award	Category	Recipient	Result
2011	5th Cable TV Broadcasting Awards	Star Award	Kim Ha-eun	Won
