= Immortal Songs =

2007–2009 South Korean TV series

- Title card
- Genre: Music
- Presented by: Tak Jae-hoon; Shin Jung-hwan; Kim Sung-eun
- Country of origin: South Korea
- Original language: Korean

Production
- Production location: South Korea

Original release
- Network: KBS
- Release: April 22, 2007 – September 14, 2008; November 30, 2008 – March 22, 2009

Immortal Songs (Korean: 불후의 명곡; RR: Bulhuui myeonggok) was a South Korean television music program presented by Tak Jae-hoon, Shin Jung-hwan and Kim Sung-eun. It aired as part of Happy Sunday.

== Season 1 ==
The first season of Immortal Songs was co-hosted by former Country Kko Kko partners Shin Jung-hwan and Tak Jae-hoon. Although the show initially had various co-hosts, Kim Sung-eun became the final permanent host alongside Shin and Tak. The special guest for the week is their "vocal coach," usually a famous Korean singer, although sometimes record producers and composers have appeared as the special guest. During the course of the show, the special guest's top singles (as voted by netizens) are revealed and the "students" must sing karaoke-style. At the end of the show, the best singer/student is chosen by the special guest and receives a special prize. This segment started from Kim Won-joon's episode where he brought in presents on his own accord. The show has typically showcased older singers from the past who may or may not be still active in the entertainment industry, including Lee Seung-chul and Kim Heung-gook. However they have also had episodes featuring more recent artists, including S.E.S., in recognition of their 10th anniversary since debut, as well as Sung Si-kyung just before he left for military service in July 2008. This show aired its final episode on September 14, 2008 and was replaced by Kko Kko Tours Single♥Single.

== Season 2 ==
Happy Sunday brought back Immortal Songs with the same hosts, Shin Jung-hwan, Tak Jae-hoon and Kim Sung-eun. Its first returning episode began airing November 30, 2008, replacing Kko Kko Tours Single♥Single. Kicking off the second season, Patti Kim was the special guest. Patti Kim was the first Korean artist to be invited and perform on Japan's NHK network as well as The Johnny Carson Show in Las Vegas, United States. In season 1, Patti Kim was one of the guests that they wanted to invite on the show but was unable to. This segment was cancelled in late March 2009 and has since been replaced with Qualifications of Men.
