= Hong Kyung-min =

South Korean singer and actor

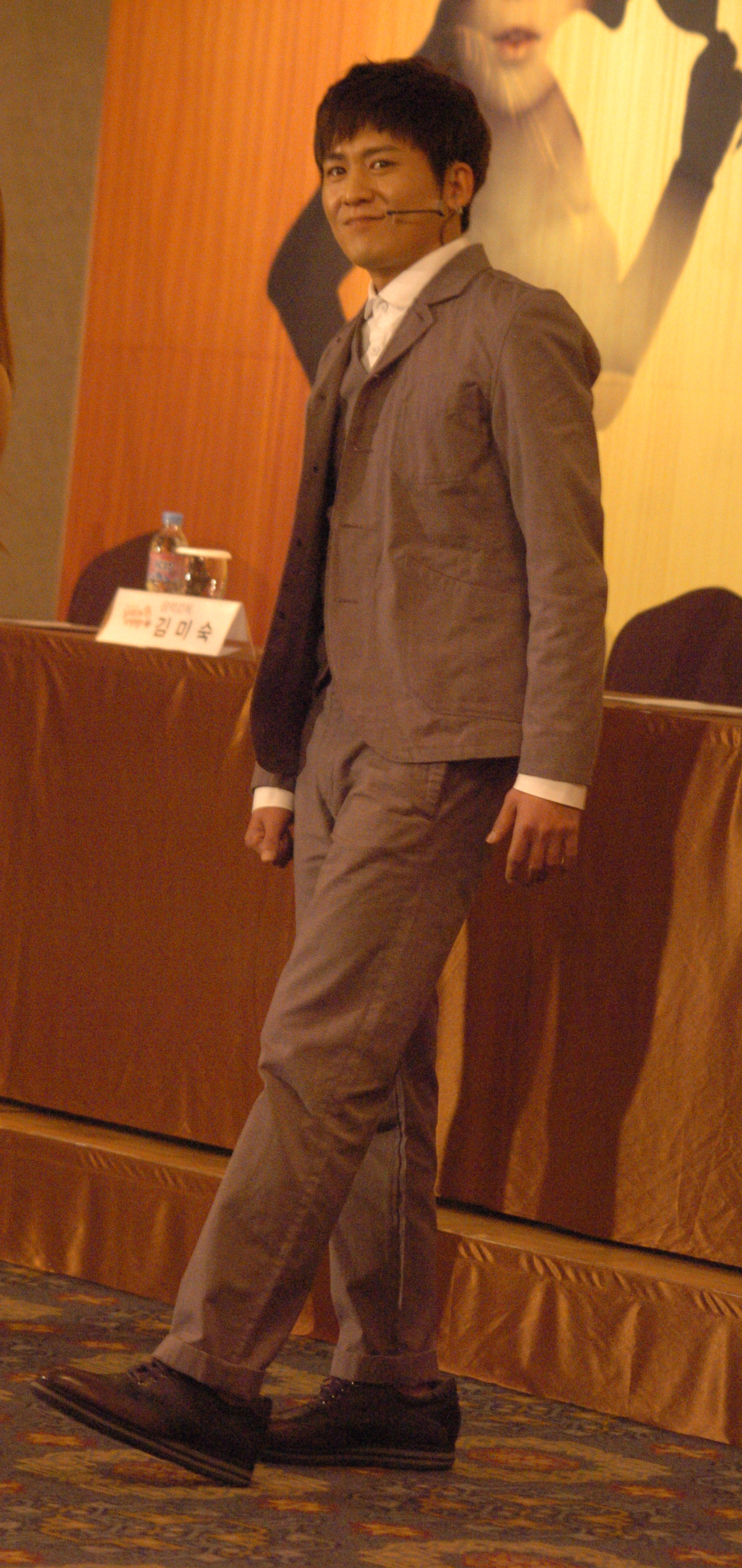
- Hong in 2013

Background information
- Born: Hong Sung-min; February 9, 1976 (age 50)
- Origin: Seoul, South Korea
- Genres: Pop rock, Latin dance
- Occupations: Singer; actor
- Instruments: Guitar, keyboard, drums, saxophone, harmonica
- Years active: 1997–present
- Website: hongkyungmin.co.kr

Korean name
- Hangul: 홍경민
- RR: Hong Gyeongmin
- MR: Hong Kyŏngmin

Hong Kyung-min (Korean: 홍경민; born February 9, 1976) is a South Korean singer and actor. As a singer, Hong has released 10 albums and is best known for his 2000 hit song "Shaky Friendship" (Korean: 흔들린 우정).

== Music career ==
=== 1997–2000 ===
He made his debut as a rock-ballad singer in 1997 with the song "Now" ("이제는"). Hong Kyung Min's style of rock was much unlike any other rock singer. Different from rock singers with loud high-pitched tones, Hong Kyung Min's mid-to-low voice color and stable tone approached listeners with a more comforting sensation.

Although he was acknowledged as a talented singer with his strong husky voice appealing to many music lovers, his place in the pop music market was not significant. However, in 2000, the single "Shaky Friendship" ("흔들린 우정") was released from his third album and became a strong success. The single's release marked a change of style, as Hong broke away from his previous rock-styled songs and moved into the Latin music genre. His third album was a strong success and the best-selling album of Hong's career, with 280,422 copies sold in its release year. As his new style of music continued to increase his popularity, Hong Kyung Min was nicknamed affectionately as "Korea's Ricky Martin".

=== 2001–2002 ===
Hong Kyung Min's success continued on into 2001, as he released his fourth album, with the hit track "Take It" ("가져가"), a single that blended rock and dance music. His fifth album, Forever and A Day, saw a brief return to his pop ballad roots with the title track "After" ("후").

2002 marked the five-year milestone in Hong Kyung Min's career. To celebrate he released a two disc compilation entitled The Hong Kyung Min Best 1997–2002 History which featured a new disco themed track "Her Charm" ("그녀의 매력"). One disc dubbed "Passion" showcased upbeat dance tracks, while the other disc ("Mood") contained ballads, showcasing Hong's diversity as a singer.

2002 also marked Hong Kyung Min's entrance into the army, putting the singer on hiatus for the next two years.

=== 2004–present ===
Having finished full military service at the end of 2004, Hong Kyung Min returned with his sixth album, Listen and Repeat, with a hit rock song "Tonight". Also featured on this album is "To My Friend", the music video for which had appearances by Hong's real life friends Cha Tae-hyun and Kim Jong-kook.

In September 2006 the singer released his seventh album, Evolution of Rhythm, which marked Hong's return to the rock genre. With the promotion of his new album, 2006 saw an increase of guest appearances on celebrity talk and game shows. A guest appearance on SBS game show New X-Man saw Hong demonstrate his talent of imitating other singers by singing Shin Seung-hun's "I Believe" in eight different celebrity voices.

The following year marked the ten-year anniversary of Hong Kyung Min's career. On August 28, 2007, he released his eighth album Music for My Life, Life for My Music, a pop ballad album reflecting on the last decade. Close friend and composer Jo Young Soo composed the title song "Fool" ("못난이"), a ballad featuring a harmonica. The sixth track of the album, "Neighbour People, Fighting!!" ("동네 사람들, Fighting!!"), was personally composed and written by Hong Kyung Min himself.

On June 28, 2008, he released his ninth album titled Keep Going. Hong Kyung Min once again changes gears, this time putting more focus into upbeat dance tracks. The album's main track "Come Back, Come Back" ("돌아와 돌아와") features hip-hop duo Mighty Mouth. This marks the first time in six years that Hong Kyung Min has released a dance song as the lead single of his album.

== Acting career ==
In July 2002 Hong made his film debut, starring as himself in the lead role of the satirical comedy Emergency Act 19 (긴급조치 19호). While the film featured many Korean entertainers as guests, the film received largely negative reviews. During an appearance on New X-Man, Hong mentioned the film as something that he was embarrassed about, but remarked that it was hard not to watch it simply because it was so bad.

Hong eventually moved onto dramas, as he starred opposite actress Lee Young-ah on the MBC romantic comedy series Love Can't Wait (사랑은 아무도 못말려) which aired from January 2, 2006, to June 30, 2006. He then starred in Fugitive, Lee Doo-young (도망자 이두용), a KBS2 miniseries which ran from September 27, 2006, to October 5, 2006.

In 2007, he had a supporting role in the SBS Drama The Person I Love (사랑하는 사람아). Starring opposite Kim Dong-wan and Han Eun-jung, the series aired from January 5, 2007, to March 27, 2007. In the same year, Hong debuted in Japan with the film 26 Years Diary (あなたを忘れない). The film was released simultaneously in both Japan and Korea. He also performed a song on the movie's soundtrack in both Korean and Japanese languages. The Korean version being penned by Hong himself.

== Personal life ==
In 2014, Hong married award-winning gugak musician Kim Yu-na, who specializes in the haegeum. The couple first met on the set of Immortal Songs: Singing the Legend when she was one of the musicians accompanying him. They have two daughters Ra-won (born 2016) and Ra-im (born 2019). Hong and his daughters are cast members of the reality show The Return of Superman.

== Discography ==
=== Studio albums ===
Title	Album details	Peak chart positions	Sales
Title	Album details	KOR	Sales
Dedicate	Released: July 1997; Label: Doremi Media; Format: CD, cassette	—N/a	—N/a
Free Throw II Shot	Released: September 1998; Label: EMI; Format: CD, cassette	—N/a	—N/a
Hong Kyung Min 3	Released: July 15, 2000; Label: Wooffer Entertainment; Format: CD, cassette	2	KOR: 280,422
Hong Kyung Min 4	Released: March 19, 2001; Label: Wooffer Entertainment; Format: CD, cassette	10	KOR: 159,387
Forever and a Day	Released: December 1, 2001; Label: Wooffer Entertainment; Format: CD, cassette	6	KOR: 108,468
Listen and Repeat	Released: December 17, 2004; Label: Maru Entertainment; Format: CD, cassette	—	—N/a
Evolution of Rhythm	Released: September 26, 2006; Label: Maru Entertainment; Format: CD, cassette	—	—N/a
Music for My Life, Life for My Music	Released: August 28, 2007; Label: Maru Entertainment; Format: CD	20	KOR: 4,148
Keep Going	Released: July 1, 2008; Label: Maru Entertainment; Format: CD	27	KOR: 3,181
Someday	Released: August 20, 2009; Label: Maru Entertainment; Format: CD, digital download	—N/a	—N/a
Special Edition	Released: February 4, 2010; Label: Maru Entertainment; Format: CD, digital download	14	—N/a
"—" denotes release did not chart.

=== Compilations albums ===
Title	Album details	Peak chart positions	Sales
Title	Album details	KOR	Sales
The Hong Kyung Min Best 1997–2002 History	Released: August 5, 2002; Label: Wooffer Entertainment; Format: CD, cassette	—	—N/a
"—" denotes release did not chart.

=== Remake albums ===
Title	Album details	Peak chart positions	Sales
Title	Album details	KOR	Sales
Emotion in Memory	Released: September 30, 2005; Label: Maru Entertainment; Format: CD, cassette	—	—N/a
Immortal Song (불후의 명곡)	Released: December 28, 2011; Label: Maru Entertainment; Format: CD, digital download	18	—N/a
"—" denotes release did not chart.

=== Feature album ===
Song	Album Information
We Will Protect You	Song: We Will Protect You; Released: February 4, 2021; Label: Sound Republica; Artist: Dream-I; Format: CD, digital download

=== Digital singles ===
Single #	Single Information
1	"That time was great...": Released: January 2007; Language: Korean; With Kim Ah-sun
2	"I Don't Know": Released: December 2008; Language: Korean
3	"Cheer Up Song": Released: 2016; Language: Korean; With Cha Tae-hyun
4	"DaDaDa": Released: July 17, 2018; Language: Korean
5	"Archive People": Released: February 17, 2019; Language: Korean; With Cha Tae-hyun and Samuel
6	"그대가 그대라서": Released: April 15, 2019; Language: Korean
7	"Good Old Days" (그날처럼): Released: January 28, 2020; Language: Korean; Feat. Ma Ji
8	"Ballad for the Daughter (딸 있는 이를 위한 발라드)": Released: June 5, 2020; Language: Korean
9	"Takedown": Released: June 6, 2020; Language: Korean; With Cha Tae-hyun
10	"More Money": Released: May 13, 2021; Language: Korean; With Novasonic
11	"Shaky Friendship": Released: August 11, 2021; Language: Korean; With No Band

== Filmography ==
=== Film ===
- 2002: Emergency Act 19
- 2007: 26 Years Diary
- 2017: Because I Love You

=== Television drama ===
Year	Title	Role
2003	Argon	Han Joon-young
2005–2006	Can Love Be Refilled?	
2006	Love Can't Wait	Kim Tae-kyung
2006	Fugitive	Lee Doo-young
2006	Behind the White Tower	Cameo
2007	The Person I Love	Yoon Tae-joo
2012	The Strongest K-Pop Survival	CEO Jang
2012	I Do, I Do	Cameo
2014	Lovers of Music	Cameo (as MC of Survival Song, Ep 5)
2014	A Better Tomorrow	Noh Do-jeon
2015	The Producers	Cameo (as station producer)
2017	Hit the Top	Park Young-jae
2019	The Golden Garden	Cameo

=== Variety show ===
Year	Title	Role	Ref.
2008	We Got Married (Pilot: "2008 Lunar New Year Special")		
2014–present	Ask Math	MC	
2017	Dragon Club – Childish Bromance	Main cast	
2019	King of Mask Singer	Contestant as "Right King", episodes 199–200	
2019–2020	The Return of Superman	Cast with his children Ra-won and Ra-im	
2020	Voice Trot	Contestant	
2020–present	Perfect Life	MC	
2020–2021	Trot National Festival	Coach	
2022	Camping in Love	Host	
2023	Golf Battle: Birdie Buddies 5	Cast Member	
2023	Express Delivery Mongolia Edition	Cast Member	

=== Radio show ===
Year	Title
2001–2002	Hong Kyung-min's Declaration of Freedom
2003–2004	Hong Kyung-min's Invincible Armed Forces Broadcasting System
2011–2012	South Korea's English Headquarter
2020–2021	Ssaeng Soo Da
2022	Cultwo Show (Special DJ)

== Awards and nominations ==
Award	Year	Category	Nominee	Result	Ref.
Golden Disc Awards	2000	Main Prize (Bonsang)	"Shaky Friendship"	Won	
KBS Entertainment Awards	2015	Top Entertainer Award	Immortal Songs 2	Won	
KBS Entertainment Awards	2019	Grand Prize (Daesang)	The Return of Superman	Won	
KBS Entertainment Awards	2020	Best Entertainer Award	Trot National Festival; The Return of Superman	Won	
KBS Entertainment Awards	2020	Top Excellence Award	Trot National Festival; The Return of Superman; Immortal Songs 2	Nominated	
KBS Song Festival	2000	Singer of the Year – Youth Sector (Bonsang)	Hong Kyung-min	Won	
KBS Song Festival	2001	Singer of the Year – Youth Sector (Bonsang)	Hong Kyung-min	Won	
MAMA Awards	2000	Best Artist	"Shaky Friendship"	Nominated	
MAMA Awards	2001	Best Dance Performance	"Take It"	Nominated	
MBC Drama Awards	2006	Special Award – Serial Drama	Love Can't Wait	Won	
SBS Gayo Daejeon	2000	Popularity Award	Hong Kyung-min	Won	
SBS Gayo Daejeon	2001	Dance Award	Hong Kyung-min	Won	
