= Golden Bride =

2007 South Korean television series

- Promotional poster
- Also known as: Bride From Vietnam
- Hangul: 황금신부
- Hanja: 黃金新婦
- RR: Hwanggeumsinbu
- MR: Hwanggŭmsinbu
- Written by: Park Hyun-joo
- Directed by: Woon Goon-il; Baek Soo-chan
- Starring: Song Jong-ho; Lee Young-ah; Song Chang-eui; Choi Yeo-jin; Kim Hee-chul
- Country of origin: South Korea
- No. of episodes: 64

Production
- Executive producer: Go Heung-sik
- Producer: Son Ok-hyun
- Running time: 70 minutes

Original release
- Network: SBS TV
- Release: 23 June 2007 – 8 May 2008

Golden Bride (Korean: 황금신부) is a 2007 South Korean weekend television drama series starring Lee Young-ah, Song Chang-eui, Choi Yeo-jin and Kim Hee-chul. It aired on SBS TV from July 23, 2007, to February 3, 2008, airing every Saturday and Sunday at 20:45 for 64 episodes. In response to its popularity, the series was extended by 14 episodes. The drama won the top prize at the Seoul Drama Festival on October 14, 2008, and the Special Drama Award at the International Drama Festival in Tokyo on October 22 of the same year. In Japan, the drama began airing on cable channel KNTV in January 2008.

== Plot summary ==
Several story-lines take place within the drama at the same time that ultimately all link up to one another.

=== Jin Joo and Jun Woo ===
Nguyen Jin Joo (Lee Young-ah) is half-Korean half-Vietnamese, working at a matchmaking service between Vietnam and South Korea as the main translator. She was raised near a temple where she was taught Korean, and although her father abandoned his family 20 years ago, her mother still longs for his return. Jin Joo works hard to earn money for a cure for her mother's night blindness. However, the doctor reveals her condition to be irreversible. As her final wish, Jin Joo's mother asks to be able to see Jin Joo's father one last time before she goes blind. In an act of desperation, she convinces her clients, Jun Woo's mother, Jung Han Sook, and aunt, Kang Koon Ja (Park Mi-sun), to take her to Korea as Jun Woo's bride in order to find her father. They both agree, finding her more suitable than the other brides. Jin Joo travels to Seoul, pretending to be Korean, and the two marry.

Though their relationship had begun with the mutual agreement that it was a fake marriage, and that they would secretly live as friends (which meant not sharing the same bed), Jin Joo's genuine effort to support him touches Jun Woo's heart and they eventually fall in love. With her mother's illness worsening, Jun Woo quickly begins to help search for Jin Joo's father.

=== Jun Woo, Ji Young and Young Min ===
Kang Jun Woo (Song Chang-eui) met Ok Ji Young (Choi Yeo-jin) at Seoul University, and they were later engaged. However, after Ji Young goes to Chicago to study abroad, she abruptly breaks off their relationship, not telling him it was due to her mother's financial problems. Jun Woo shortly rushes to Chicago and has a violent encounter with her that results in Ji Young calling the police. They violently beat Jun Woo and lock him up in an American prison for three months. This severely traumatizes Jun Woo, causing him to develop a serious heart condition and melancholia. In an attempt to improve his health, Jun Woo's mother flies to Vietnam in search of a wife.

Three years later, Ji Young marries Kim Young Min (Song Jong-ho). Young Min is unaware of the family feud, as Ji Young hides her past with Jun Woo, as well as her strained relationship with her wayward mother, whom she is ashamed of. This ultimately leads to the destruction of her marriage.

=== Han Sook, Ok Kyung and Sang Il ===
A lifelong cold war exists between Jung Han Sook (Kim Mi-sook) and Yang Ok Kyung (Kyeon Mi-ri), starting in high school when Ok Kyung steals Han Sook's boyfriend, Kim Sang Il (Im Chae-moo), and marries him after faking a pregnancy. Their two sons, Young Min and Young Soo, grow up in a luxurious household while Han Sook's family struggles. The feud intensifies when Han Sook discovers that Young Min's new wife is Ok Ji Young, the woman responsible for Jun Woo's condition.

Though from the outside Ok Kyung and Sang Il's marriage seems happy, they have a damaging past. 22 years ago, Sang Il abandoned his family to go overseas, not contacting them for 2 years. This led to Ok Kyung falling into a depression and drinking. When he returned, they resumed their marriage as if nothing happened, but Ok Kyung secretly dreads what might have happened during his absence.

=== Sae Mi and Young Soo ===
Kang Sae Mi (Han Yeo-woon) is Jun Woo's younger sister who works as a model. By coincidence, she catches the eye of Kim Young Soo (Kim Heechul), the younger brother of Young Min, at a club. Rejected on the basis of being told that he is a rich playboy, Young Soo goes through several changes in order to impress her, much to the amusement of his family. After getting a job as a security guard at Sae Mi's modeling agency, Young Soo attempts to woo her again. It's only when he discovers her ambition to become an actress that Sae Mi softens towards him, as he encourages her to audition at his father's company.

Their relationship finally blossoms after he helps her win a competition for a hotel gift card for Jin Joo and Jun Woo's honeymoon, although Young Soo had mistakenly thought it had been for them. Sae Mi and Young Soo remain oblivious to the family feud for most of the drama series, but when it is discovered, they are inevitably affected.

=== Won Mi and Dong Gu ===
Kang Won-mi (Hong Eun-hee) is Jun Woo and Sae Mi's older sister, the eldest of the siblings. Though in her early 30s, she is unmarried and is often rejected at dating services. She works as a music teacher to children, teaching the violin. Heo Dong Gu (Kim Kyung-sik) is a law student who has for years tried to woo Sae Mi by becoming her driver, although he is repeatedly turned down. In an attempt to win her over, Dong Gu asks Won-mi to help, getting them both into strange and hilarious situations. After joining the military and keeping in contact with her only through letters, Dong Gu falls in love with Won-mi, although at this time Won-mi begins dating a dentist.

== Cast ==
- Song Jong-ho as Kim Young-min
- Lee Young-ah as Nguyen Jin-joo
- Song Chang-eui as Kang Jun-woo
- Choi Yeo-jin as Ok Ji-young
- Kim Hee-chul as Kim Young-soo
- Han Yeo-woon as Kang Sae-mi
- Kim Mi-sook as Jung Han-sook (Jun-woo's mother)
- Kang Shin-il as Kang Woo-nam (Jun-woo's father)
- Hong Eun-hee as Kang Won-mi (Jun-woo's older sister)
- Kyeon Mi-ri as Yang Ok-kyung (Young-min and Young-soo's mother)
- Im Chae-moo as Kim Sang-il / Richard Kim (Young-min's father)
- Park Mi-sun as Kang Koon-ja (Woo-nam's sister)
- Kim Kyung-sik as Heo Dong-gu
- Kim Ji-young as Maeng Man-deok
- Như Quỳnh (Jin-joo's mother)

== Awards and nominations ==
Year	Award	Category	Recipient	Result
2007	SBS Drama Awards	Best Actor in a Serial Drama	Im Chae-moo	Won
2007	SBS Drama Awards	Best Actress in a Serial Drama	Kyeon Mi-ri	Won
2007	SBS Drama Awards	Special Acting Award	Như Quỳnh	Won
2007	SBS Drama Awards	Top 10 Stars	Lee Young-ah	Won
2007	SBS Drama Awards	Top 10 Stars	Song Chang-eui	Won
2007	SBS Drama Awards	New Star Award	Song Jong-ho	Won
2007	SBS Drama Awards	New Star Award	Choi Yeo-jin	Won
2008	3rd Seoul International Drama Awards	Best Series Drama (Silver Bird Prize)	Golden Bride	Won
2008	44th Baeksang Arts Awards	Best New Actor (TV)	Song Chang-eui	Won
