= Dragon's Club: Overgrown Bromance =

- Poster of season 1
- Also known as: Childish Bromance
- Genre: Reality show
- Country of origin: South Korea
- Original language: Korean
- No. of seasons: 2
- No. of episodes: 12

Production
- Production location: South Korea
- Camera setup: Multiple-camera setup
- Running time: 80 minutes

Original release
- Network: KBS2
- Release: October 10, 2017 – February 6, 2018

Childish Bromance (Korean: 철부지 브로망스) is a 2017 South Korea reality show featuring a group of celebrity friends who take a trip together. It airs on KBS2 on Tuesdays at 23:10(KST) from October 10, 2017.

== Series overview ==
Season	Episodes no.	Title	Broadcast period	Cast
1	7	Dragon club (용띠클럽)	October 10, 2017 – December 19, 2017	Kim Jong-kook, Jang Hyuk, Cha Tae-hyun, Hong Kyung-min, Hong Kyung-in
2	5	A Praiseworthy Show (절찬상영중)	January 9, 2018 – February 6, 2018	Sung Dong-il, Ko Chang-seok, Lee Jun-hyeok, Lee Sung-kyung

== Overview ==
=== Season 1: Dragon club ===
The title of the show refers to the fact that the five stars of the show were all born in 1976, the Year of the Dragon: actors Jang Hyuk, Cha Tae-hyun and Hong Kyung-in and singers Kim Jong-kook and Hong Kyung-min. Despite being friends for over twenty years, they had never starred together on a show due to conflicting schedules and decided to take a trip to Gangwon Province for six days and five nights.

== Original soundtrack ==
=== Part 1 ===
No.	Title	Artist	Length
1.	"You're my friend"	Hong Kyung-min	3:17
2.	"You're my friend" (Inst.)		3:17

=== Part 2 ===
No.	Title	Artist	Length
1.	"Today's Radio"	Hong Kyung-min
2.	"Today's Radio" (Inst.)

== Ratings ==
In the ratings below, the highest rating for the show will be in red, and the lowest rating for the show will be in blue episode.

=== Season 1 ===
Episode #	Original broadcast date	Average audience share	
Episode #	Original broadcast date	AGB Ratings	TNmS
1	October 10, 2017	4.8%	4.5%
2	October 17, 2017	3.1%	3.5%
3	October 24, 2017	3.3%	3.4%
4	November 28, 2017	2.1%	2.3%
5	December 5, 2017	1.8%	2.1%
6	December 12, 2017	1.6%	2.0%
7	December 19, 2017	2.1%	1.5%

==== Note ====
- Episode 4's broadcast was delayed for 4 weeks due to a workers strike at KBS

=== Season 2 ===
Episode #	Original broadcast date	Average audience share
Episode #	Original broadcast date	AGB Ratings
1	January 9, 2018	2.4%
2	January 16, 2018	2.2%
3	January 23, 2018	2.1%
4	January 30, 2018	2.2%
5	February 6, 2018	2.1%
