= Daegaya =

Koreanic city-state (fl. until 6th century)

- Hangul: 대가야
- Hanja: 大伽倻
- RR: Daegaya
- MR: Taegaya

Daegaya (Korean: 대가야; Hanja: 大伽倻) was a city-state in the Gaya confederacy during the Korean Three Kingdoms period. Daegaya was located in present-day Goryeong County, in North Gyeongsang Province of South Korea. (It should not be confused with Goryeong Gaya, which was located around present-day Sangju.)

According to "Geographies" in the Samguk sagi, Daegaya existed for about 520 years from the first king, Ijinasi (이진아시왕), to the last, Doseolji (도설지왕). Daegaya had sixteen kings from King Ijinasi to King Doseolji, but only five of those are known. The first king was Ijinasi, the ninth king Inoe, the sixteenth king Doseolji, and King Haji, whose generation is uncertain. King Haji (하지; 荷知) sent an embassy to Namje (南齊, in Southern Qi) in 479. According to Chinese records, he received a rank of the third order, one rank below Baekje and Silla.

Daegaya developed quickly and played a major role in the Gaya confederacy in the 5th century AD, partly because of its advanced steel-making craft, but its progress and that of the confederacy were limited by the neighboring kingdoms of Baekje and Silla, which were more fully developed as centralized political entities. Incidental historical records and archaeological findings indicate a highly stratified aristocratic society in Daegaya and the Gaya confederacy at this time.

King Haji allied with Baekje and Silla to attack Goguryeo in 481. Daegaya allied with Baekje to attack Silla (which, for Baekje, was in response to Silla's breach of their 120-year truce) at the battle of Gwansan Fortress in 554, but both Baekje and Gaya suffered heavy losses. This confrontation policy alienated the other member states of the Gaya confederation, and Daegaya lost its leadership of Gaya to Ara Gaya.

Daegaya fell to the armies of Silla under general Kim Isabu in 562; Silla, having already begun to absorb much of the Gaya confederacy, had invaded Daegaya as punishment for having allied with Baekje in 554.

Archaeologically confirmed remains include Ancient Tombs in Jisan-dong. its turned out to be the tombs of the ruling class of Daegaya.

== Names ==
The name Daegaya is suspected to be first used around the late Gaya Confederacy. The name itself were also used by Geumgwan Gaya during the early days of Gaya Confederacy.

== List of kings ==
Next is the king of Daegaya.

1. King Ijinasi
2. King Geumnim
3. King Haji
4. King Gasil
5. King Inoe
6. King Doseolji (? – 562 CE)

== Gallery ==
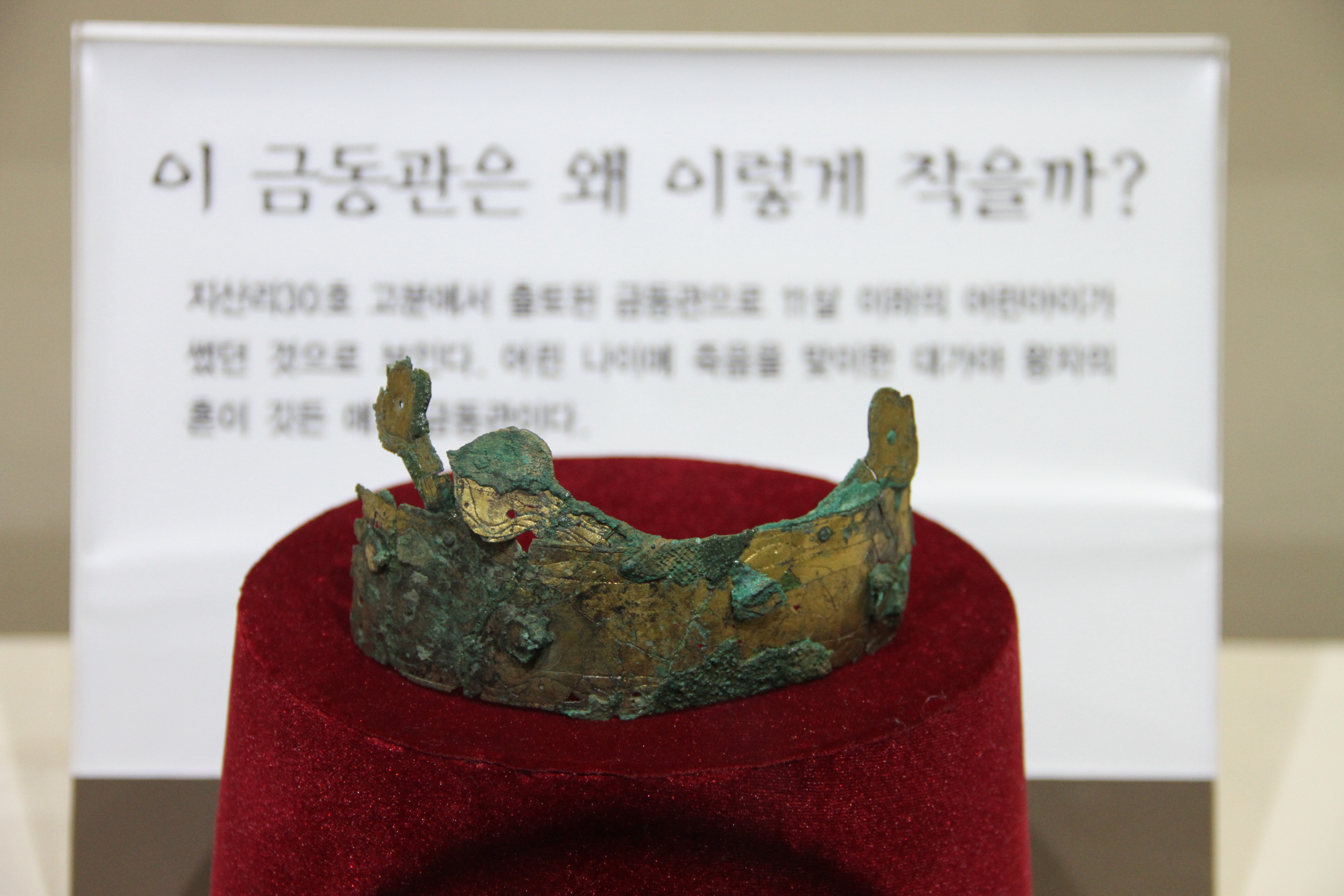
Crown of Daegaya.

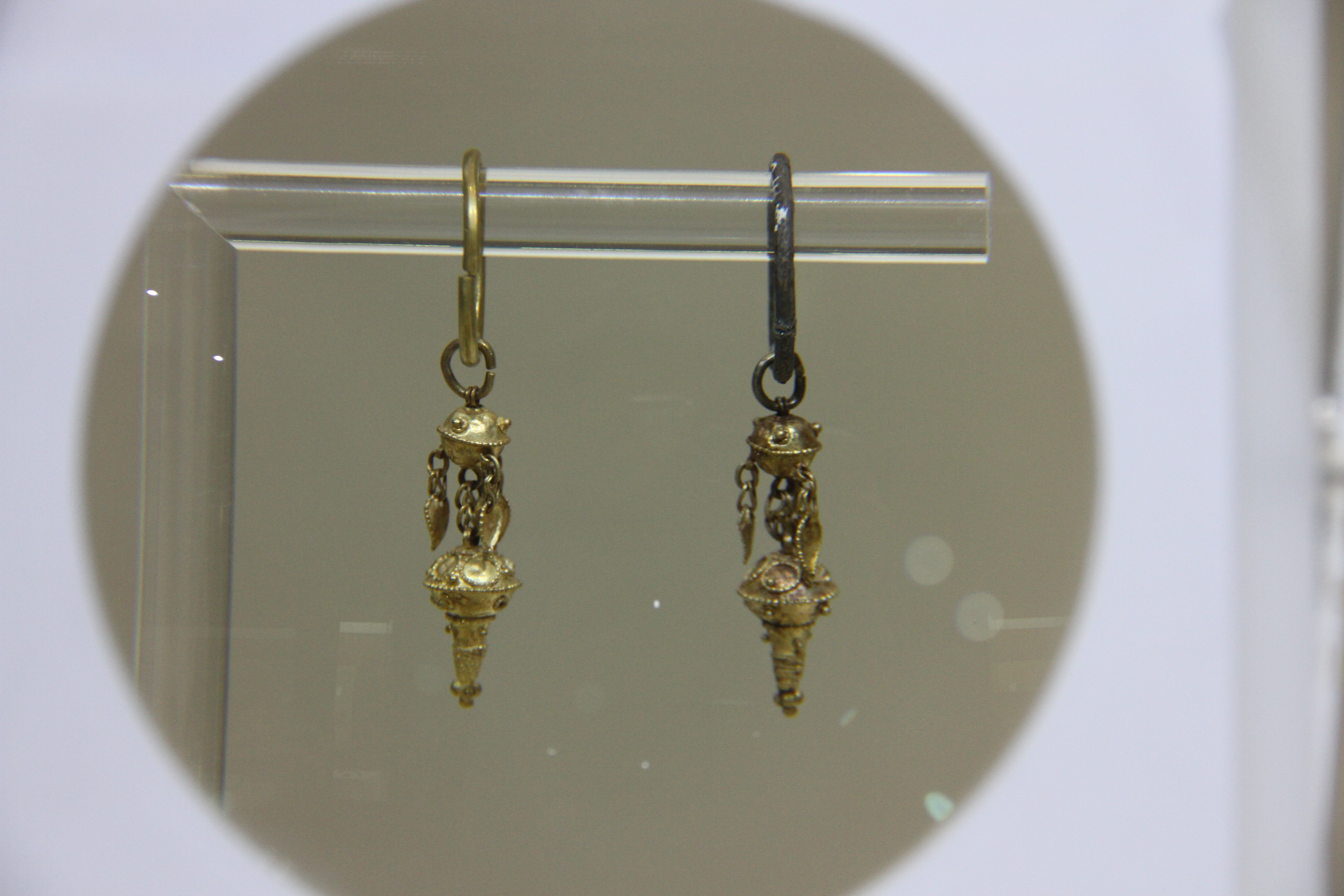
Golden earrings of Daegaya.

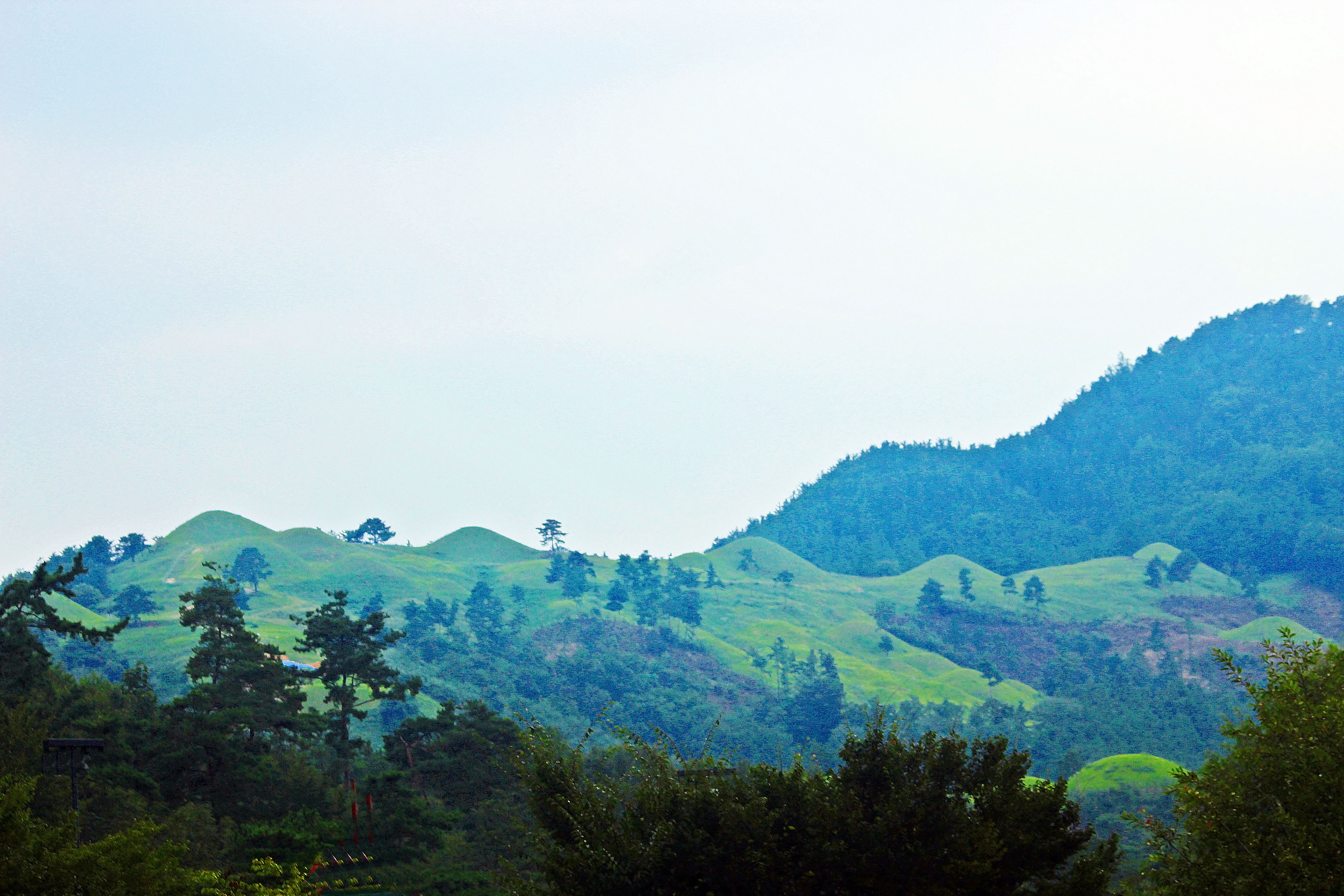
Ancient Tombs in Jisan-dong

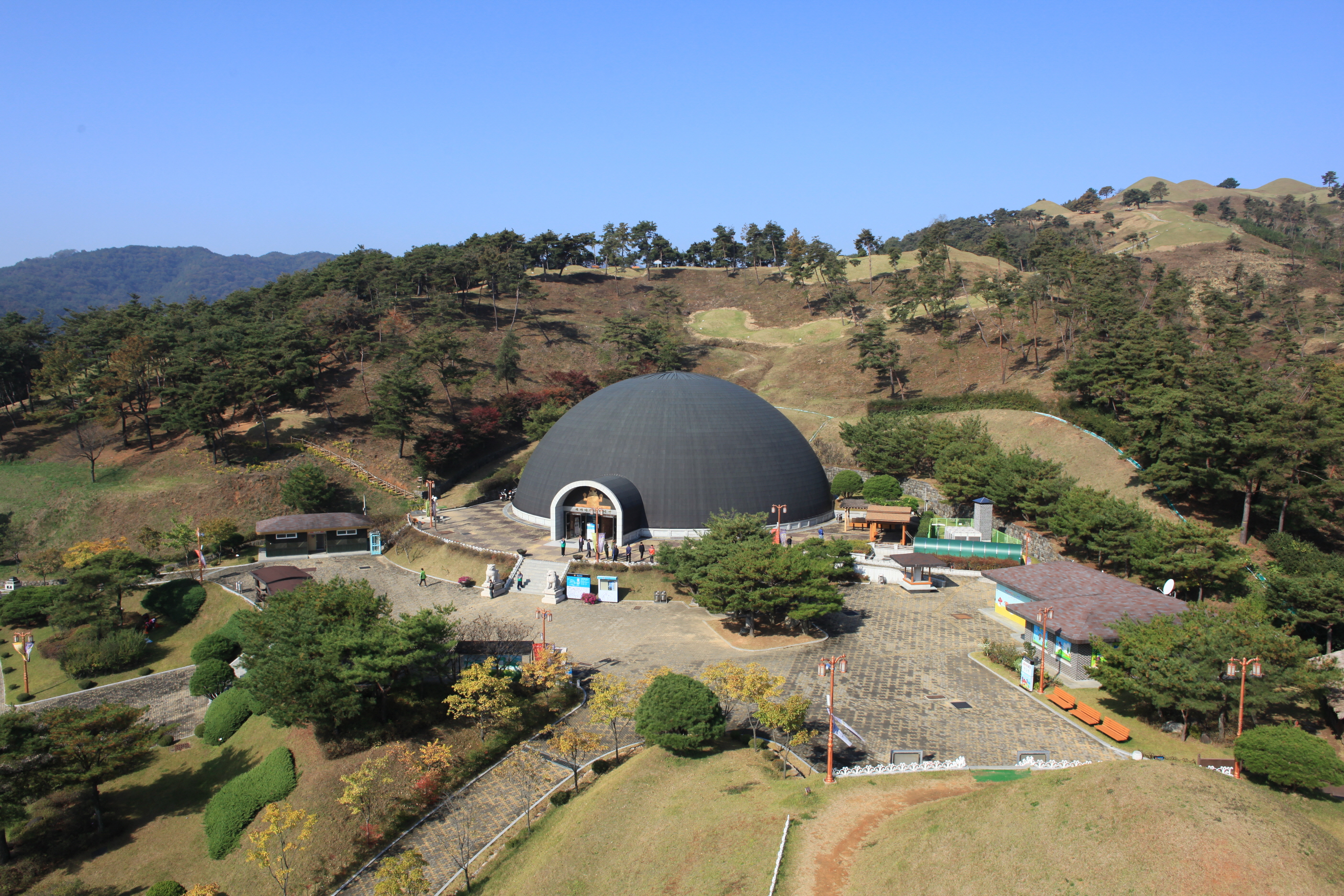
Daegaya royal tomb at the exhibition place.

== See also ==
- List of Korean monarchs
- History of Korea
- Geumgwan Gaya
