= Love Truly =

- Promotional poster for Love Truly
- Also known as: I Really Really Like You
- Written by: Bae Yoo-mi
- Directed by: Kim Jin-man
- Starring: Eugene; Lee Min-ki; Ryu Jin
- Opening theme: "I Really Really Like You" by Eugene
- Ending theme: "Like a Candy" by Eugene
- Country of origin: South Korea
- Original language: Korean
- No. of episodes: 34

Production
- Executive producer: Shin Ho-gyun
- Camera setup: Multi-camera
- Running time: 50 minutes

Original release
- Network: Munhwa Broadcasting Corporation
- Release: April 8 – August 6, 2006

Love Truly (Korean: 진짜 진짜 좋아해; RR: Jinjja jinjja joahae; lit. 'I Really, Really Like You') is a 2006 South Korean television series starring Eugene, Lee Min-ki, and Ryu Jin. It aired on MBC from April 8 to August 6, 2006 on Saturdays and Sundays at 19:55 for 34 episodes.

The drama serves as a reunion for Eugene and Jung Da-bin who first worked together as mother and daughter in the 2005 hit drama Wonderful Life.

Due to its popularity, the drama received a musical adaptation in 2009 named "I Really Really Like You" starring T-ara's Park Hyomin, Oh Jeong-hae, Shin Ae-ra, Kang Ji-woo, Yoo Hyun-soo, Oh San-ha, and music directors Shin Hae-chul and Ji Hyun-soo which was played from November 28, 2009 to March 1, 2010 at the Naru Art Center.

== Plot ==
Yeo Bong-soon (Eugene) grew up in the provinces, but is given a chance to become a chef at the presidential residence, the Blue House. At first, she seems out of touch with the real world and people find her naïve. However, her sweetness, thoughtfulness, and diligence make it easier for the people around her to like her and eventually accept her for who she is.

Nam Bong-ki (Lee Min-ki) is a seemingly lazy and self-centered presidential guard, who initially dislikes Bong Soon for her outdated looks and provincial mentality, but gradually starts to fall for her. Bong-ki is shallow and arrogant, but being near Bong-soon changes his perspective: he becomes more generous, willing to help, and understanding. When Bong-ki develops feeling for Bong-soon, the story turns into a love triangle — Bong-soon having already given her heart to a man she saved on a mountain next to her house, the handsome and intelligent doctor Jang Joon-won.

Jang Joon-won (Ryu Jin) is the president's son but none of his friends or colleagues know about it, which allows him to keep his privacy. He is a well-loved doctor, but he carries a secret that is known only to a select few. After his encounters with Bong-soon, he becomes enamored by her. But how long can Joon-won keep his feelings in check, especially since his secret prevents him from falling in love with her?

== Cast ==
=== Main characters ===
- Eugene as Yeo Bong-soon

25 years old, chef at the Blue House. She is a cheerful, honest and naïve person. She loves daydreaming. She is always thinking about something. Her little room is filled with stacks of books. She loves cooking and has won a few cooking contests. She used to live with her grandmother in the countryside, but after her grandmother's death she came to Seoul to find her birth parents. Since she was completely out of touch with the world, she seems like an alien to other people. She runs into problems at every corner in the bustling metropolis of Seoul. She speaks with a very thick Gangwon Province accent. For most people, it is difficult to understand her dialect. However, it is easy to like her. She's incredibly diligent and always on the move. She gets breakfast ready by 6 in the morning as she used to do in her hometown. Her neighbors have a hard time understanding her. For them, her interest in other people's business seems unnecessary. They are not used to getting help that they do not ask for. However, as time goes by, they start opening their hearts and accept her.

- Lee Min-ki as Nam Bong-ki

28 years old, bodyguard to the President's family. He is tall and handsome. However, he is a lazy womanizer who looks down on women, even categorizing them by appearance, and does not wish to waste any resources on women he considers 'unqualified'. According to his classification, Bong-soon belongs to the lowest group. He is the kind of person that people love to hate. He does not wish to be involved in other people's lives. He is very individualistic and selfish. He tries to avoid anything requiring responsibility and does not have any problem refusing to help those in need. He loves shoes and collects them. He is constantly unhappy, complaining and unbalanced; frequently muttering, shouting or kicking things. He is vain and shallow. He becomes the bodyguard of the president's granddaughter.

- Ryu Jin as Jang Joon-won

31 years old, son of the President. He's always smiling. He's handsome, intelligent and kind. The women in the hospital where he's working agree that he is the most attractive doctor in the country. He is generous, modest and warm-hearted, and is very popular with his patients. It is hard to believe that he's the son of the president. He's not interested in the way he looks. Only a few people know that his father is the president. He has been married for 13 years and has a five-year-old daughter. His wife has been suffering from dementia for three years and he feels helpless about the fact that he is unable to do anything to help her, as she took care of him for 8 years while he studied and worked. His in-laws want him to get a divorce and start a new life. However, he can not give up on his wife unless she wants to leave him.

=== Supporting characters ===
- Geum Bo-ra as Lee Han-sook, Bong-soon's mother, former movie star, 47 y/o
- Jang Yong as Nam Dae-sik, Bong-ki's father, carpenter, 61 y/o
- Choi Bool-am as Jang Min-ho, President of South Korea, Joon-won's father, 59 y/o
- Kim Hye-ok as Oh Young-sil, Joon-won's mother, First Lady of South Korea, 53 y/o
- Jung So-young as Go Ji-soo, Joon-won's wife, 31 y/o
- Jung Da-bin as Jang Hyo-won, Joon-won's daughter, 5 y/o
- Ahn Hye-kyung as Noh Jin-kyung, nutritionist-in-charge of the canteen, 29 y/o
- Kim Chang-wan as Kang San, head chef at the Blue House, 50 y/o
- Kwon Ki-sun as Ma Ok-hee, cook, 47 y/o
- Lee Young-ja as Song Eon-joo, cook, 39 y/o
- Youn Yuh-jung as Goo Hyang-sook, cook, 55 y/o
- Shin Min-hee as Geum Soo-kyung, Han-sook's stepdaughter, 19 y/o
- Yoon Seung-won as Lee Sang-jik, chief of the guard department, 48y/o
- Ryu Tae-joon as Kim Joo-yeob, bodyguard nicknamed Robocop, 28 y/o
- Yoon Ji-hoo as Kang Moon-sik, bodyguard, 28 y/o
- Kim Guk-jin as Ki Hyung-do, photographer, 35 y/o
- Kang In-deok as Bang Pil-do, Ok-hee's ex-husband, barber, 59 y/o
- Kim Hee-jung as Soo-jung

== See also ==
- List of Korean television shows
- Contemporary culture of South Korea
