= Jeon Jun-hyeok =

South Korean actor and model

- Born: July 22, 2003 (age 23); Seoul, South Korea
- Occupations: Actor; model

Korean name
- Hangul: 전준혁
- RR: Jeon Junhyeok
- MR: Chŏn Chunhyŏk

Jeon Jun-hyeok (born July 22, 2003) is a South Korean actor and model.

== Filmography ==
=== Television series ===
Year	Title	Role	Network
2007	Hometown Over the Hill	Han Bo-ram	KBS1
2008	My Life's Golden Age		MBC
2008	Don't Cry My Love		MBC
2008	Star's Lover		SBS
2009	Boys Over Flowers		KBS2
2009	My Too Perfect Sons	Kindergarten kid	KBS2
2010	The Slave Hunters	Crown Prince Sohyeon's son	KBS2
2011	Insu, the Queen Mother	child Prince Jinsung	JTBC
2012	Feast of the Gods	child Ha In-woo	MBC
2013	Blooded Palace: The War of Flowers	Prince Kyungsun	JTBC
2013	Good Doctor	Park Yi-on	KBS2
2013	Golden Rainbow	child Kim Man-won	MBC
2013	My Love from the Star	Elementary school boy (cameo, episode 5)	SBS
2014	Can We Fall in Love, Again?	Han Tae-guk	JTBC
2014	Lovers of Music	Sibling on the beach (cameo, episode 12)	KBS2
2014	Mama	Kim Han-se	MBC

=== Film ===
Year	Title	Role	Notes
2009	Fly, Penguin		
2009	Maternity		Dankook University Short Film
2009	White Night		
2010	Cafe Seoul		
