= 2013 MBC Drama Awards =

32nd edition of award ceremony

- Date: December 30, 2013
- Hosted by: Lee Seung-gi; Han Ji-hye

Highlights
- Best Drama Serial: A Hundred Year Legacy
- Grand Prize (Daesang): Ha Ji-won – Empress Ki

Television coverage
- Network: MBC

The 2013 MBC Drama Awards is a ceremony honoring the outstanding achievement in television on the Munhwa Broadcasting Corporation (MBC) network for the year of 2013. It was held on December 30, 2013 and hosted by actor Lee Seung-gi and actress Han Ji-hye.

== Nominations and winners ==
(Winners denoted in bold)

Grand Prize (Daesang)	Drama of the Year
**Ha Ji-won** – **Empress Ki**	**A Hundred Year Legacy**; Empress Ki; Gu Family Book; Princess Aurora; Pots of Gold; The Scandal
Top Excellence Award, Actor in a Miniseries	Top Excellence Award, Actress in a Miniseries
**Lee Seung-gi** – **Gu Family Book**; Kwon Sang-woo – Medical Top Team; Song Seung-heon – When a Man Falls in Love	**Bae Suzy** – **Gu Family Book**; Choi Kang-hee – 7th Grade Civil Servant; Go Hyun-jung – The Queen's Classroom; Jung Ryeo-won – Medical Top Team
Top Excellence Award, Actor in a Special Project Drama	Top Excellence Award, Actress in a Special Project Drama
**Joo Jin-mo** – **Empress Ki**; **Kim Jaewon** – **The Scandal**; Cho Jae-hyun – The Scandal	**Shin Eun-kyung** – **The Scandal**; Ha Ji-won – Empress Ki; Moon Geun-young – Goddess of Fire
Top Excellence Award, Actor in a Serial Drama	Top Excellence Award, Actress in a Serial Drama
**Lee Jung-jin** – **A Hundred Year Legacy**; Kim Joo-hyuk – Hur Jun, the Original Story; Lee Jae-ryong – The King's Daughter, Soo Baek-hyang	**Han Ji-hye** – **Pots of Gold**; Eugene – A Hundred Year Legacy; Ha Hee-ra – You Are the Boss!; Park Won-sook – A Hundred Year Legacy
Excellence Award, Actor in a Miniseries	Excellence Award, Actress in a Miniseries
**Joo Won** – **7th Grade Civil Servant**; Ju Ji-hoon – Medical Top Team; Lee Joon-gi – Two Weeks	**Shin Se-kyung** – **When a Man Falls in Love**; Kim So-yeon – Two Weeks; Lee Yeon-hee – Gu Family Book; Park Ha-sun – Two Weeks
Excellence Award, Actor in a Special Project Drama	Excellence Award, Actress in a Special Project Drama
**Ji Chang-wook** – **Empress Ki**; Jung Il-woo – Golden Rainbow; Lee Sang-yoon – Goddess of Fire; Park Sang-min – The Scandal	**Uee** – **Golden Rainbow**; Jo Yoon-hee – The Scandal; Kim Gyu-ri – The Scandal
Excellence Award, Actor in a Serial Drama	Excellence Award, Actress in a Serial Drama
**Yeon Jung-hoon** – **Pots of Gold**; Jin Tae-hyun – Hold My Hand; Jo Hyun-jae – The King's Daughter, Soo Baek-hyang; Namkoong Min- Hur Jun, the Original Story	**Hong Soo-hyun** – **A Little Love Never Hurts**; Park Si-eun – Hold My Hand; Seo Hyun-jin – The King's Daughter, Soo Baek-hyang; Seo Woo – The King's Daughter, Soo Baek-hyang
Golden Acting Award, Actor	Golden Acting Award, Actress
**Cho Jae-hyun** – **The Scandal**; **Jeong Bo-seok** – **A Hundred Year Legacy**; **Kim Sang-joong** – **Golden Rainbow**; Baek Yoon-sik – Hur Jun, the Original Story; Jo Min-ki – Two Weeks; Park Geun-hyung – A Little Love Never Hurts	**Cha Hwa-yeon** – **A Little Love Never Hurts**; **Kim Bo-yeon** – **Princess Aurora**; **Lee Hye-sook** – **Pots of Gold**; Choi Myung-gil – Pots of Gold; Geum Bo-ra – Pots of Gold; Park Hae-mi – Princess Aurora
Best New Actor	Best New Actress
**Lee Sang-yeob** – **A Little Love Never Hurts**; **Oh Chang-seok** – **Princess Aurora**; Choi Jin-hyuk – Gu Family Book; Choi Min-ho – Medical Top Team; Park Seo-joon – Pots of Gold	**Baek Jin-hee** – **Empress Ki**; **Jeon So-min** – **Princess Aurora**; Lee Yu-bi – Gu Family Book; Park Eun-bin – Hur Jun, the Original Story
Best Young Actor	Best Young Actress
**Chun Bo-geun** – **The Queen's Classroom**	**Kim Hyang-gi** – **The Queen's Classroom**; **Kim Sae-ron** – **The Queen's Classroom**; **Lee Young-yoo** – **The Queen's Classroom**; **Seo Shin-ae** – **The Queen's Classroom**
PD Award	Writer of the Year
**Ha Ji Won** – **Empress Ki**	**Gu Hyun-sook** – **A Hundred Year Legacy**; **Jang Young-chul**, **Jung Kyung-soon** – **Empress Ki**
Popularity Award, Actor	Popularity Award, Actress
**Lee Seung-gi** – **Gu Family Book**; Ji Chang-wook – Empress Ki; Joo Jin-mo – Empress Ki; Kim Jaewon – The Scandal; Kwon Sang-woo – Medical Top Team; Lee Joon-gi – Two Weeks; Lee Jung-jin – A Hundred Year Legacy; Lee Sang-yoon – Goddess of Fire; Song Seung-heon – When a Man Falls in Love; Yeon Jung-hoon – Pots of Gold	**Ha Ji Won** – **Empress Ki**; Bae Suzy – Gu Family Book; Eugene – A Hundred Year Legacy; Go Hyun-jung – The Queen's Classroom; Han Ji-hye – Pots of Gold; Jo Yoon-hee – The Scandal; Jung Ryeo-won – Medical Top Team; Moon Geun-young – Goddess of Fire; Park Ha-sun – Two Weeks; Shin Se-kyung – When a Man Falls in Love
Best Couple Award	Achievement Award
**Lee Seung-gi** and **Bae Suzy** – **Gu Family Book**; Eugene and Lee Jung-jin – A Hundred Year Legacy; Ha Ji-won and Ji Chang-wook – Empress Ki; Ha Ji-won and Joo Jin-mo – Empress Ki; Han Ji-hye and Yeon Jung-hoon – Pots of Gold; Jeong Bo-seok and Jeon In-hwa – A Hundred Year Legacy; Jo Hyun-jae and Seo Hyun-jin – The King's Daughter, Soo Baek-hyang; Kim Jaewon and Jo Yoon-hee – The Scandal; Oh Chang-seok and Jeon So-min – Princess Aurora; Park Seo-joon and Baek Jin-hee – Pots of Gold; Seo Ha-joon and Jeon So-min – Princess Aurora; Song Seung-heon and Shin Se-kyung – When a Man Falls in Love	**Han Jin-hee** – **Pots of Gold**; **Park Won-sook** – **A Hundred Year Legacy**
