= Naturally (TV series) =

South Korean television show

- Promotional Poster
- Also known as: Be Natural
- Hangul: 자연스럽게
- RR: Jayeonseureopge
- MR: Chayŏnsŭrŏpke
- Genre: Reality
- Written by: Shin Myeong-jin; Kim Jeong-eun; Kim Chu-hee; Oh Ji-hye
- Starring: Jeon In-hwa; Kim Jong-min; Hur Jae; Kim Gook-jin; Kang Susie; Jo Byung-gyu
- Country of origin: South Korea
- Original language: Korean
- No. of seasons: 1
- No. of episodes: 43

Production
- Executive producer: Yoo Il-yong
- Producers: Yoo Il-yong; Park Seon-hye; Yeom Gyu-bon; Park Jeong-ae; Kim Ji-yoon
- Production location: South Korea
- Running time: 100 minutes

Original release
- Network: MBN
- Release: August 3, 2019 – May 30, 2020

Naturally (Korean: 자연스럽게) is a South Korean reality show program on MBN starring Jeon In-hwa, Kim Jong-min, Hur Jae, Jo Byung-gyu, Kim Gook-jin and Kang Susie. The show airs on MBN every Saturday at 21:20 (KST) starting from August 3, 2019 and ended on May 30, 2020.

== Changes in Running Time ==
Air Date	Air Time	Ref.
Air on Every Saturday
3/8/2019 – 19/10/2019	21.10 – 22.50	
Air on Every Monday
28/10/2019 – 27/1/2020	23.00 – 00.40	
Air on Every Saturday
8/2/2020 – 30/5/2020	21:20 – 23.00	

== Synopsis ==
This show aims to let the cast members have their 2nd home at the countryside by using 1 million won to rent the houses. They will also be renovating the old countryside houses into the casts' dream house concepts and also be experiencing the stay at the countryside. Jeon In-hwa stays alone in the rented house, Eun Ji-won and Kim Jong-min stay together in another rented house together and Jo Byung-gyu stays with the original owner of the house.

== Casts ==
Name	Episode	Ref.
Jeon In-hwa	1 – 43	
Eun Ji-won	1 – 12, 14 – 26	
Kim Jong-min	1 – 6, 8 – 43	
Jo Byung-gyu	1 – 6, 8 – 12, 20, 26, 36 – 43	
Hur Jae	13 – 43	
So Yoo-jin	14 – 23, 25 – 26	
Kim Gook-jin	27 – 43	
Kang Susie	27 – 43	

== Guests ==
=== 2019 ===
Name	Episode(s)	Ref.
Jang Seok-joon (Note: as interior designers)	1	
Park Seong-jae	1	
Yoo Dong-geun	6 – 7	
Kim Jin-woo (Winner)	7 – 8	
Mino (Winner)	7 – 8	
Yoon Si-yoon	9 – 10	
Shin Ji (Koyote)	10 – 11	
Chun Myung-hoon	10 – 11	
Kangnam	10 – 12	
So Yoo-jin	12	
Lee Mi-soo (Note: Hur Jae's wife)	14 – 15	
Kim Jun-ho	14 – 16	
Hwang Jae-sung	15 – 16	
Kim Byung-hyun	17 – 18	
Sim Jin-hwa	19, 21	
Heo Hoon (Note: Hur Jae's 2nd son)	19	
Shin Ki-sung (Note: Hur Jae's former basketball collages)	22	
Kim Sang-jun	22	
Kim Seung-gi	22	
Chung Kyung-ho	22	

=== 2020 ===
Name	Episode(s)	Ref.
Ji Sang-ryeol	23	
Han Ji-hye	23 – 26	
Park Se-hyun	27	
Song Kyung-ah	28 – 29	
Do Hye-yi
Song Hae-na
Kim Jin-kyung
Lee Yeon-bok	29 – 30	
Lee Hong-yoon	29 – 30	
Jung Seung-soo	29 – 30	
Lee Hye-sook	30	
Lee Bo-hee	30	
Kim Yo-han		
Jang Dae-hyun		

== Ratings ==
- Ratings listed below are the individual corner ratings of Naturally. (Note: Individual corner ratings do not include commercial time, which regular ratings include.)
- In the ratings below, the highest rating for the show will be in red and the lowest rating for the show will be in blue each year.

=== 2019 ===
List of episodes in 2019 (episode 1–22)

Ep. #	Original Airdate	AGB Nielsen Ratings Nationwide
1	August 3, 2019	2.411%
2	August 10, 2019	2.640%
3	August 17, 2019	2.276%
4	August 24, 2019	1.729%
5	August 31, 2019	1.484%
6	September 7, 2019	1.667%
7	September 14, 2019	2.268%
8	September 21, 2019	2.038%
9	September 28, 2019	1.489%
10	October 5, 2019	1.439%
11	October 12, 2019	1.846%
12	October 19, 2019	2.017%
13	October 28, 2019	1.757%
14	November 4, 2019	1.891%
15	November 11, 2019	1.714%
16	November 18, 2019	1.554%
17	November 25, 2019	1.462%
18	December 2, 2019	1.511%
19	December 9, 2019	1.264%
20	December 16, 2019	1.577%
21	December 23, 2019	2.043%
22	December 30, 2019	1.791%

=== 2020 ===
List of episodes in 2020 (episode 23–present)

Ep. #	Original Airdate	AGB Nielsen Ratings Nationwide
23	January 6	1.776%
24	January 13	1.417%
25	January 20	1.098%
26	January 27	1.370%
27	February 8	1.77%
28	February 15	1.344%
29	February 22	1.185%
30	February 29	1.976%
31	March 7	1.273%
32	March 14	2.213%
33	March 21	2.342%
34	March 28	2.014%
35	April 4	1.926%
36	April 11	1.539%
37	April 18	1.558%
38	April 25	2.038%
39	May 2	2.193%
40	May 9	1.602%
41	May 16	1.866%
42	May 23	1.358%
43	May 30	1.665%
