= Can We Fall in Love, Again? =

2014 South Korean TV series

- Promotional poster
- Also known as: Can We Love, Again?
- Genre: Romance; Comedy; Family
- Based on: Mother Needs a Man by Han Kyung-hye
- Written by: Park Min-jung
- Directed by: Kim Yoon-cheol
- Starring: Uhm Tae-woong; Eugene; Kim Yoo-mi; Choi Jung-yoon; Kim Sung-soo
- Country of origin: South Korea
- Original language: Korean
- No. of episodes: 20

Production
- Executive producer: Jo Joon-hyung
- Producers: Lee Sun-sang; Park Jun-seo
- Production location: Korea
- Cinematography: Kim Kyung-cheol
- Editor: Nam In-joo
- Production companies: Drama House; Curtain Call Inc. Red Rover

Original release
- Network: JTBC
- Release: January 6 – March 11, 2014

Can We Fall in Love, Again? (Korean: 우리가 사랑할 수 있을까; lit. 'Can We Love') is a 2014 South Korean television series starring Eugene, Uhm Tae-woong, Kim Yoo-mi, Choi Jung-yoon and Kim Sung-soo. It aired on JTBC from January 6 to March 11, 2014 for 20 episodes.

The series is based on Han Kyung-hye's novel Mother Needs a Man, which was published by Random House Korea in 2007.

== Synopsis ==
It tells the story of three very close friends, Yoon Jung-wan (Eugene), Kim Sun-mi (Kim Yoo-mi), and Kwon Ji-hyun (Choi Jung-yoon), who are all 39 years old. They each have their own problems.

After getting divorced from her husband of ten years, Jung-wan takes her nine-year-old son and moves back in with her mother. She is a scriptwriter, but due to her current financial difficulties, she works part-time at a market. Jung-wan gets a chance to collaborate on a project with an award-winning film director, the bad-tempered and conceited Oh Kyung-soo (Uhm Tae-woong).

Sun-mi is a successful decorator who is happily single. But an ex-boyfriend who dated her for her money derides her as an "old maid who is dying to get married".

Ji-hyun is a full-time housewife who's married to a businessman. She seems to be living a comfortable life; however, she has a demanding mother-in-law and a rebellious teenage daughter. She was once secretly in love with Ahn Do-young (Kim Sung-soo), now the CEO of a film company who works with her friend Jung-wan. To make matters more complicated, Ji-hyun's husband is one of the investors in Do-young's company.

== Cast ==
=== Main ===
- Eugene as Yoon Jung-wan, a screenwriter, Joon-mo's ex-wife.
- Uhm Tae-woong as Oh Kyung-soo, a talented director who won Cannes Film Festival Award for Best Director and Palme d'Or
- Kim Yoo-mi as Kim Sun-mi, an interior designer
- Choi Jung-yoon as Kwon Ji-hyun, Gyu-shik's wife, Do-young's first love
- Kim Sung-soo as Ahn Do-young, the owner of a film production company, Kyung-soo's cousin

=== Supporting ===
- Kil Yong-woo as Ji-hyun's father (special appearing)
- Im Ye-jin as Gyu-shik's mother (special appearing)
- Kim Hee-ryung as Kyung-soo's mother, Do-young and Kyung-joo's younger aunt (special appearing)
- Kim Ki-hyeon as Do-young and Kyung-joo's father (special appearing)
- Kim Chung as Do-young and Kyung-joo's mother (special appearing)
- Kim Hye-ok as Yang Soon-ok, Jung-wan's mother
- Nam Sung-jin as Lee Gyu-shik, Ji-hyun's husband, the owner of an investment company
- Shim Hyung-tak as Han Joon-mo, Jung-wan's ex-husband, Kyung-joo's fiancé, a college professor
- Jung Soo-young as Moon Eun-joo, an employee of Sun-mi's company
- Park Hyo-jun as Kwon Tae-hyun, Ji-hyun's younger brother
- Seo Dong-won as Park Seung-ryong, a film producer
- Jang Joon-yoo as Ahn Kyung-joo, Joon-mo's fiancée, Do-young's younger sister
- Park Min-woo as Choi Yoon-seok, an employee of Sun-mi's company who likes Sun-mi every much.
- Han Ji-woo as Jang Ha-na, an employee of Sun-mi's company
- Jin Ji-hee as Lee Se-ra, Ji-hyun and Gyu-shik's daughter
- Kim Soo-jin as Kwon Yoo-kyung, Tae-hyun's adopted daughter, Ji-hyun and Do-young's biological daughter
- Jeon Jun-hyeok as Han Tae-guk, Jung-wan and Joon-mo's son
- Jung Yoo-geun as Lee Se-jin, Ji-hyun and Gyu-shik's son, Se-ra's younger brother
- Kim Sa-kwon as PD Jo
- Park Young-jin
- Yoon Hae-yoon

=== Cameo ===
- Jung Dong-hwan as an actor (ep. 1)
- Kim Byung-choon as delegate Choi, the owner of a film production company (ep. 1-2)
- Jung Ae-yeon as Son Hee-soo, an actress (ep. 1)
- Jung Kyu-soo as delegate Koo, the owner of a film production company (ep. 4)
- Lee Jae-won as a lawyer (ep. 5)
- Lee Yoon-mi as Kang Soo-hee, a fashion designer (ep. 6)
- Kim Sung-min as Kim Young-ho, Sun-mi's arranged date (ep. 10-11)
- Kim Hyun-joo as herself, a top star (ep. 13-14)
- Gong Hyun-joo as Shin Yoon-ha, an actress (ep. 17-18)

== International broadcast ==
- Thailand: PPTV beginning October 6, 2014.
- Vietnam: VTV2 beginning October 28, 2015.
- Panama: Sertv beginning December 18, 2017.
