= Unstoppable Marriage =

- Theatrical poster
- Hangul: 못말리는 결혼
- Hanja: 못말리는 結婚
- RR: Monmallineun gyeolhon
- MR: Monmallinŭn kyŏrhon
- Directed by: Kim Seong-wook
- Written by: Kim Young-chan; Kang Soo-jin; Yu Nam-gyeong
- Produced by: Choi Soon-sik; Park Gwang-won; Choe Gwang-ho; Kim Jho Kwang-soo
- Starring: Kim Soo-mi; Im Chae-moo; Eugene; Ha Seok-jin
- Cinematography: Lee Ki-won
- Edited by: Ko Im-pyo
- Music by: Choi Man-sik
- Distributed by: Lotte Entertainment
- Release date: May 10, 2007
- Running time: 115 minutes
- Country: South Korea
- Language: Korean
- Box office: US$8,208,838

Unstoppable Marriage (Korean: 못말리는 결혼) is a 2007 South Korean romantic comedy film. It stars veteran actors Kim Soo-mi and Im Chae-moo alongside popstar and television actress Eugene and Ha Seok-jin. The film is Eugene's big screen debut, and is also the directorial debut of Kim Seong-wook, who previously worked as an assistant director on other films such as Fun Movie (2002), My Teacher, Mr. Kim (2003) and Lovely Rivals (2004).

The film was released in South Korea on May 10, 2007, and had a total of 1,304,431 admissions.

== Plot ==
Sweet and easygoing Eun-ho grew up in a normal middle-class household with a strict and traditional father. Arrogant plastic surgeon Ki-baek was born into a wealthy family, and has the ego to match his income. Their two worlds collide quite literally when they meet through a paragliding accident. It's a classic case of opposites attract as they fight, falter, and fall in love, but their incompatible families are determined to break them up.

== Cast ==
- Kim Soo-mi as Shim Mal-nyeon
- Im Chae-moo as Park Ji-man
- Eugene as Park Eun-ho
- Ha Seok-jin as Hwang Ki-baek
- Yoon Da-hoon as Park Ji-ru
- Ahn Yeon-hong as Hwang Ae-suk

== Television adaptation ==
Unstoppable Marriage was adapted into a 2007 television series, in which Kim Soo-mi and Im Chae-moo reprised their roles in the film. Seo Do-young and Park Chae-kyung were cast in the roles of Ha Seok-jin and Eugene, respectively.
