= Lee Sung-yol =

South Korean television drama director

- Hangul: 이승렬
- RR: I Seungryeol
- MR: I Sŭngnyŏl

Lee Sung-yol is a South Korean television drama director who directed hits such as Jealousy (질투, 1992), Kukhee (국희, 1999) and Save the Last Dance for Me (2004).
