= Jung Da-bin (actress, born 2000) =

South Korean actress (born 2000)

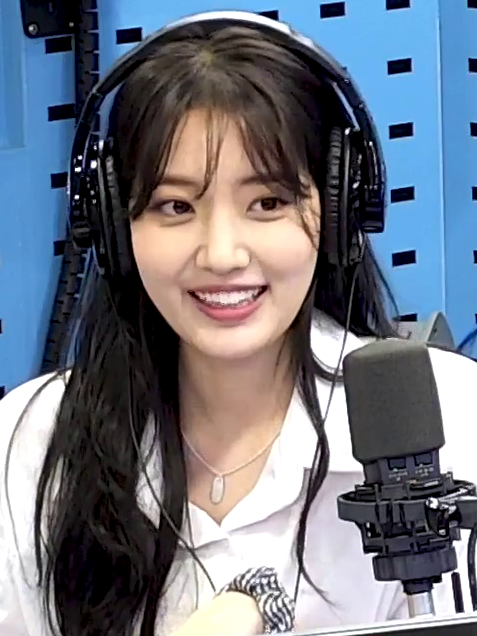
- Jung in 2020
- Born: April 25, 2000 (age 26); South Korea
- Other name: Jeong Da-bin
- Education: Hanyang University – Theater and Film
- Occupation: Actress
- Years active: 2003–present
- Agent: Fantagio

Korean name
- Hangul: 정다빈
- Hanja: 鄭多彬
- RR: Jeong Dabin
- MR: Chŏng Tabin

Jung Da-bin (Korean: 정다빈; born April 25, 2000) is a South Korean actress. She first gained recognition in 2003 as a commercial model for Baskin-Robbins and was widely dubbed as "Ice Cream Girl". In 2005, she made her acting debut through the television series Wonderful Life. Since then, she has appeared in several dramas including She Was Pretty (2015) and The Flower in Prison (2016). She transitioned to leading roles with Extracurricular (2020), Live On (2020–2021) and High Cookie (2023).

== Career ==
In April 2022, Jung Da-bin signed an exclusive contract with MAA.

On October 14, 2025, it was reported that she signed an exclusive contract with Fantagio.

== Filmography ==
Key
†	Denotes films that have not yet been released

=== Film ===
Year	Title	Role	Ref.
2004	Shit Up!		
2004	Marrying School Girl		
2005	Bravo, My Life		
2006	Now and Forever	young Han Hye-won	
2008	Lost and Found	Girl	
2015	Love Never Fails	Park So-won	
2017	Golden Movie	Dabin	
2018	Middle School Girl A	Baek-hap	

=== Television series ===
Year	Title	Role	Notes	Ref.
2005	Wonderful Life	Han Shin-bi		
2006	Love Truly	Jang Hyo-won		
2008	Iljimae	young Bong-soon		
2008	The Kingdom of the Winds	young Princess Se Ryu		
2009	Star's Lover	young Lee Ma-ri	Cameo	
2009	Can Anyone Love?	Oh Jang-mi		
2010	Life Is Beautiful	Lee Ji-na		
2011	Sign	Da-bin	Cameo (episode 13–14)	
2011	Manny	Oh Eun-bi		
2011	Miss Ripley	young Jang Mi-ri		
2011	Deep Rooted Tree	Yeon-doo		
2012	Glass Mask	young Kang Yi-kyung		
2012	Dream of the Emperor	young Gotaso		
2013	Ugly Alert	young Gong Jin-joo		
2013	Thunder Store	Jung Da-bin		
2013	Melody of Love	Han Tae-hee		
2013	Prime Minister & I	young Seo Hye-joo	Cameo (episode 6)	
2014	I Need Romance 3	young Shin Joo-yeon		
2014	Thunder Store 2	Da-bin		
2015	Beating Again	young Kim Soon-jung		
2015	Save the Family	Son Da-hye		
2015	She Was Pretty	young Kim Hye-jin / Kim Hye-rin		
2016	Flowers of the Prison	young Ok-nyeo		
2017	The Rebel	Ok Ran		
2017	My Sassy Girl	Gyun-hee		
2018	Should We Kiss First?	Son Yi-deun		
2020	Extracurricular	Seo Min-hee		
2020–2021	Live On	Baek Ho-rang		
2022	Glitch	Kim Young-gi		
2023	High Cookie	Choi Min-young		
2024	My Arti Film	Herself	Episode: "Noona, You Are So Pretty"	
2026	The Art of Sarah	Woo Hyo-eun		
2026	KBS Drama Special: "Sound:Track"	Hong Su-bin		

=== Web series ===
Year	Title	Role	Notes	Ref.
2016	What's With Money?	Na Bo-ram		

=== Music video appearances ===
Year	Song title	Artist	Ref.
2006	"Grace"	Lee Soo-young	
2006	"Cold"	Lee Soo-young	
2010	"Your Name is Love"	Stay (Shim Tae-yoon)	
2015	"Flame"	Choa	
2017	"It's U"	Golden Child	

== Awards and nominations ==
Year	Award	Category	Nominated work	Result	Ref.
2016	MBC Drama Awards	Best Young Actress	The Flower in Prison	Won	
