= Pure Pumpkin Flower =

2010–2011 South Korean television series

- Promotional poster
- Hangul: 호박꽃 순정
- RR: Hobakkkot Sunjeong
- MR: Hobakkot Sunjŏng
- Genre: Drama; Family; Melodrama; Romance
- Written by: Ha Chung-ok
- Directed by: Baek Soo-chan
- Starring: Lee Chung-ah; Bae Jong-ok
- Country of origin: South Korea
- Original language: Korean
- No. of episodes: 124

Production
- Producer: Kim Jung-min
- Production location: Korea
- Running time: 30 minutes Mondays to Fridays at 19:15 (KST)
- Production company: Pan Entertainment

Original release
- Network: Seoul Broadcasting System
- Release: 15 November 2010 – 13 May 2011

Pure Pumpkin Flower (Korean: 호박꽃 순정) is a South Korean television series starring Lee Chung-ah, Bae Jong-ok, Jin Tae-hyun and Jang Hyun-sung. It aired on SBS on Mondays to Fridays at 19:20 from November 15, 2010 to May 13, 2011 for 124 episodes.

== Cast ==
- Lee Chung-ah as Park Soon-jung
  - Kim Yoo-jung as young Soon-jung
- Bae Jong-ok as Joon-sun
- Jin Tae-hyun as Yoo Min-soo
- Jang Hyun-sung as Hyun-mook
- Park Si-eun as Oh Sa-ra
- Im Hyun-sik as old man Oh
- Shin Eun-jung as Oh Kyung-bok
- Ban Hyo-jung as Ms. Jang
- Kim Il-woo as Oh Geum-bok
- Lee Hye-sook as Pil-soon
- Yoo Yeon-seok as Hyo-joon
- Im Se-mi as Hyo-sun
- Kim Hyung-bum as Sung-woon
- Cha Kwang-soo as Oh Eun-bok
- Lee Eung-kyung as Se-mi
- Kim Dong-beom as Hyo-jae
- Park Young-ji as Yoo Jae-hwan
- Choi Joon-yong as Kwang-woon
- Jin Ye-sol as Joon-sun's personal secretary
- Kim Ye-ryeong as Kim Myung-ja
- Kim Sun-il as businessman
- Ha Na-kyung as restaurant employee
