= Doori Land =

Amusement park in Yangju, South Korea

- Interactive map of Doori Land
- Location: Yangju, Gyeonggi Province, South Korea
- Coordinates: 37.724°N 126.950°E
- Opened: May 1, 1990
- Owner: Im Chae-moo
- Website: Official website

Korean name
- Hangul: 두리랜드
- RR: Duri raendeu
- MR: Turi raendŭ

Doori Land (Korean: 두리랜드; lit. 'land of pairs') is an amusement park in Jangheung-myeon, Yangju, South Korea. It was founded in 1990 by actor Im Chae-moo.

== Description ==
The park has more than 30 attractions, including a swimming pool, a haunted house, bumper cars, and indoor play area. It previously had a ferris wheel, a pirate ship ride, and an outdoor trampoline, but these were eventually closed.

The park reportedly had around 70 to 80 employees by 2021. Im and his grandson work at the park. The park is reportedly open most of the year, although its traffic significantly drops in the winter. Since 2020, it has been charging an entry fee.

The park has been featured on several South Korean television programs. An episode of the 2021 television series Vincenzo was filmed in the park.

== History ==
The park was first conceptualized in 1973, when Im was acting for a sageuk (historical drama) in the area. He was inspired by families he watched playing in a nearby valley. He felt that conditions in the area were unsafe for the children, and decided to build a safer facility for them. He began buying property in the area in the late 1970s, when his career was going well. He initially owned 1,500 pyeong (5,000 m^{2}), and eventually came to own 16,000 pyeong (53,000 m^{2}). Construction began on the park in 1989. He eventually opened the park on May 1, 1990. The initial entrance fee was ₩2,000. Soon after opening, he observed a family struggling to pay for entry into the park; he decided to waive the entry fee and instead charge for entry to each ride.

Im reportedly takes pride in the park, and claims to have been extensively involved in every aspect of managing it. He claims to have designed it, he performs repairs, and he cleans it. He reportedly works long hours, sleeping late and rising early to work on the park. Among park visitors, he has developed a positive reputation as the friendly "Doori Land man" (두리랜드 아저씨). This image reportedly contrasted with his older public image of a serious dramatic actor.

The park has struggled with its finances for most of its history. Through the 1990s, Im made most of his income from television appearances; this income stream began to decline in later years. He eventually began selling off his belongings in order to keep the park running. Its attendance continued to decline (in part due to South Korea's declining birthrate), meanwhile Im weathered the 1997 Asian financial crisis, a lawsuit, and an alleged scam. The park also experienced storms, typhoons, and floods. It closed for a period of time beginning in 2006, but reopened in 2009. By 2016, the park was reportedly losing around $28,000 a month. Im briefly closed the park in 2017, and put it up for sale, but had no interested buyers. Afterwards, he decided to renovate and reopen the park. The renovations took three years and cost him his remaining assets, including a yacht and two apartments in Seoul. He sold his last apartment in Seoul in 2020 and moved into the park. For a year, he and his wife lived in cots in the pool bathroom. They began charging entrance fees to the park. By 2024, Im and his wife lived in the park's main building. He estimated that he lost around $15 million of his earnings to the park; by 2024 he was $7 million in debt.

In a 2022 interview, Im acknowledged that, after he died, the park would likely be closed and its assets liquidated, although he hoped that a new owner would continue to maintain it. When asked why he still maintained the park instead of living on renting out his former real estate properties, he said that "the happy man is someone who has a purpose, something to do each day", and "when you laugh with children every day, you don't age" (아이들과 매일 웃어보세요 안 늙지).
