= Golden Rainbow (TV series) =

2013 South Korean television series

- Promotional poster
- Also known as: Gold Rainbow
- Genre: Romance; Family; Melodrama
- Written by: Son Young-mok; Cha Yi-young
- Directed by: Kang Dae-sun; Lee Jae-jin
- Starring: Uee; Jung Il-woo; Cha Ye-ryun; Lee Jae-yoon
- Country of origin: South Korea
- Original language: Korean
- No. of episodes: 41

Production
- Executive producer: Choi Won-seok
- Running time: 80 minutes
- Production company: May Queen Pictures

Original release
- Network: MBC TV
- Release: November 2, 2013 – March 30, 2014

Golden Rainbow (Korean: 황금 무지개; RR: Hwanggeum mujigae) is a 2013 South Korean television drama series starring Uee, Jung Il-woo, Cha Ye-ryun and Lee Jae-yoon. It aired on MBC from November 2, 2013 to March 30, 2014 on Saturdays and Sundays at 21:55 for 41 episodes.

== Plot ==
Adopted and raised by the same father, seven orphans grew up together as a family in a town near the ocean. With the bond between them even stronger than that of blood-related siblings, they experience hardships together, and struggle to succeed in the marine products industry.

The story mainly revolves around a girl who was kept away from her mother by her paternal grandmother. The mother asks her longtime friend to steal her back, and so he does. However, he gets caught and sent to prison for 6 years. Meanwhile, the girl is back with her grandmother, but 6 years later, at an amusement park, she is kidnapped. She later on escapes and finds a home with a boy and his grandmother. The grandmother dies, and the longtime friend that stole her back the first time finds the girl and the boy trying to steal fish. He keeps them as his own kids, and adds 5 more kids after them later on.

== Cast ==
=== Main characters ===
- Uee as Kim Baek-won / Jang Ha-bin (3rd child)
  - Kim Yoo-jung as teenage Baek-won
  - Lee Chae-mi as child Baek-won
- Jung Il-woo as Seo Do-young
  - Oh Jae-moo as teenage Do-young
- Cha Ye-ryun as Kang Kyung-mi / Kim Cheon-won / Yoon Ha-bin (2nd child)
  - Song Yoo-jung as teenage Cheon-won
- Lee Jae-yoon as Kim Man-won (eldest child)
  - Seo Young-joo as teenage Man-won
  - Jeon Jun-hyeok as child Man-won
- Kim Sang-joong as Kim Han-joo
- Do Ji-won as Yoon Young-hye
- Jo Min-ki as Seo Jin-ki
- Ahn Nae-sang as Chun Eok-jo

=== Supporting characters ===
Kim Han-joo's family

- Choi Soo-im as Kim Shib-won (4th child)
  - Ahn Seo-hyun as young Shib-won
- Lee Ji-hoon as Kim Yeol-won (5th child)
  - Jung Yoon-seok as young Yeol-won
- Kim Tae-joon as Kim Il-won (6th child)
- Park Sun-ho as Kim Young-won / Michinski Forever (7th child)
  - Choi Ro-woon as young Young-won

Seo Jin-ki's family

- Park Won-sook as Kang Jung-shim
- Ji Soo-won as Jang Mi-rim
- Jae Shin as Seo Tae-young
  - Lee Seung-ho as teenage Tae-young

Chun Eok-jo's family

- Kim Hye-eun as Yang Se-ryun
- Ryu Dam as Chun Soo-pyo
  - Gree as teenage Soo-pyo

Extended cast

- Lee Won-pal as Park Woong
- Lee Hee-jin as Park Hwa-ran
- Lee Dae-yeon as Kim Jae-soo
- Seo Hyun-chul as Kang Dong-pal
- Kim Dae-ryung as Jo Kang-doo
- Ham Sung-min as Jeong-woo
- Choi Dae-sung as Officer Lee
- Park Chung-seon as class president
- Ji Young-woo as hotelier
- Lee Seung-won as homeroom teacher
- Park Woo-chun as Jung Jae-hong
- Yoo Ara as Young-won's secretary
- Lee Seung-ho as Seo Tae-yeong
- Kang Hyun-jung as female investigator
- Kim Ki-joon as Oh Kwang-hyuk
- Kang Ji-won as Oh Eun-ji
- Shim Ho-sung as employee at fish farm
- Kim Kwang-in as chief prosecutor

== Awards and nominations ==
Year	Award	Category	Recipient	Result
2013	MBC Drama Awards	Excellence Award, Actor in a Special Project Drama	Jung Il-woo	Nominated
2013	MBC Drama Awards	Excellence Award, Actress in a Special Project Drama	Uee	Won
2013	MBC Drama Awards	Golden Acting Award, Actor	Kim Sang-joong	Won
2014	9th Seoul International Drama Awards	Outstanding Korean Drama	Golden Rainbow	Nominated
2014	9th Seoul International Drama Awards	Outstanding Korean Drama OST	The Moon Cries - Ulala Session	Nominated
2014	9th Seoul International Drama Awards	Outstanding Korean Drama OST	Only You - Kim Jang-hoon	Nominated
