= Eugene (actress) =

South Korean actress (born 1981)

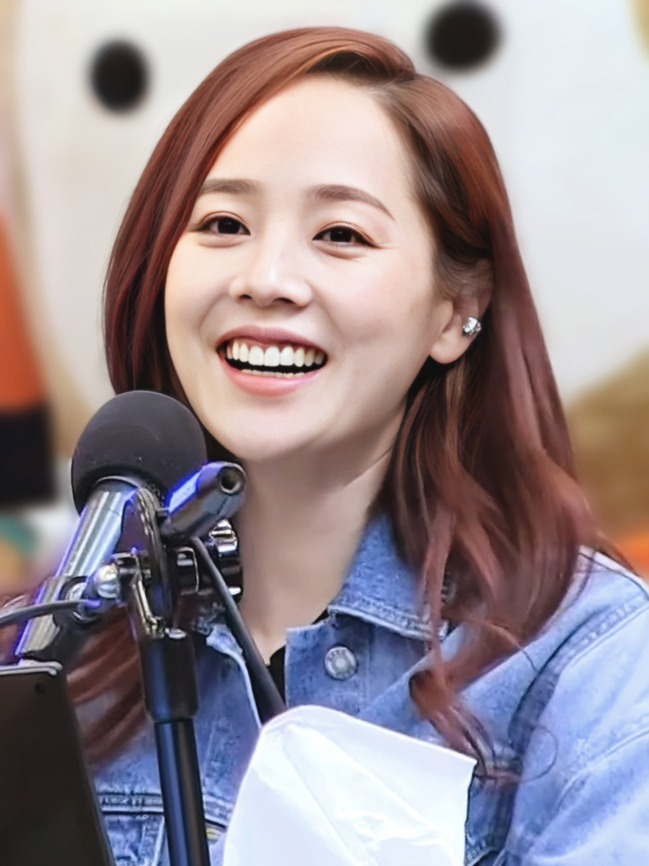
- Eugene in February 2021
- Born: Kim Yoo-jin; March 3, 1981 (age 45); Seoul, South Korea
- Education: Korea Kent Foreign School
- Occupations: Singer; actress
- Years active: 1997–present
- Agent: INN Company
- Spouse: Ki Tae-young (m. 2011)
- Children: 2
- Musical career
- Genre: K-pop
- Instrument: Vocals
- Labels: SM; F&J; Kakao M
- Formerly of: S.E.S.; SM Town

Korean name
- Hangul: 김유진
- Hanja: 金梄眞
- RR: Gim Yujin
- MR: Kim Yujin

Signature
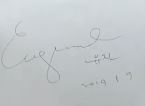

Kim Yoo-jin (Korean: 김유진; born March 3, 1981), known anglicizedly and mononymously as Eugene, is a South Korean actress and singer. She is a former member of the girl group S.E.S., which went on to become one of South Korea's best-selling artists. Following the group's disbandment in 2002, she subsequently left SM Entertainment and released two solo studio albums.

As an actress, Eugene has participated in various television dramas and movies, making her acting debut in KBS2 Loving You (2002). Her other notable roles include in Save the Last Dance for Me (2004), Wonderful Life (2005), Bread, Love and Dreams (2010), A Hundred Year Legacy (2013), All About My Mom (2015) and The Penthouse: War in Life (2020–2021).

== Early life and education ==
Eugene was born in Seoul, South Korea. Following her grandfather's suggestion, who lived in Guam, her family immigrated to Guam after she finished the first semester of 5th-grade elementary school. She attended Agueda I. Johnston Middle School from October 1992 until June 1995, and John F. Kennedy High School from June until September 1996. She returned to Korea with her mother and younger sister to finish high school, and eventually graduated from Korea Kent Foreign School, Seoul in June 1999. At high school, more than 80% of her subjects were A credits. In elementary school, only 23 out of 24 subjects were awarded. In middle school, almost all her subjects were excellent.

== Career ==
=== S.E.S. ===
Eugene made her debut with S.E.S. in 1997. S.E.S enjoyed tremendous success, becoming the top-selling K-pop girl group during their era. The group disbanded at the end of 2002 after Bada, and Eugene parted ways from SM Entertainment, while Shoo stayed with SM Entertainment until 2006.

On May 28, 2016, Eugene, with S.E.S. members Bada and Shoo, attended a charity event, Green Heart Bazaar. In October 2016, Eugene, along with Bada and Shoo, re-formed S.E.S. to celebrate their 20th anniversary since the debut of the group. They started their project of the 20th anniversary debut with released digital single "Love[Story]", a remake of their 1999 single "Love", through SM Entertainment's digital project SM Station on November 28 and its music video released on December 29.

In early December 2016, they aired their ten-episode reality show Remember, I'm Your S.E.S., which broadcast through mobile app Oksusu. To accompany their 20th anniversary debut, they held a concert, Remember, the Day, on December 30 and 31 at Sejong University's Daeyang Hall in Seoul.

On January 2, the special album of their 20th anniversary debut Remember was released. The album consists of double lead singles. "Remember" was digitally released on January 1 and "Paradise" was released along with the album on January 2. They held a fanmeet as their last project of 20th anniversary debut called I Will Be There, Waiting For You on March 1, 2017.

=== Solo career ===
After S.E.S. disbanded in late 2002, Kim released two solo albums: My True Style and 810303. Her first album sold nearly 65,000 records and had one hit ballad, The Best which included bonus tracks, "Jesus Loves Me", in which she had handwritten the lyrics to this special mashup. She had also previously released a single, "Shout to the Lord" in 2001 under a collaborative Christian album The Gift. Besides releasing solo albums, she also starred in four Korean dramas: Loving You, Save The Last Dance for Me, Wonderful Life, and Love Truly.

Eugene made her theater debut in the musical adaptation of the film Innocent Steps and her film debut in Unstoppable Marriage. After taking on the lead roles in the dramas One Mom and Three Dads, and Creating Destiny, Eugene then starred in the television series Bread, Love and Dreams, which was a huge hit and earned "national drama" status.

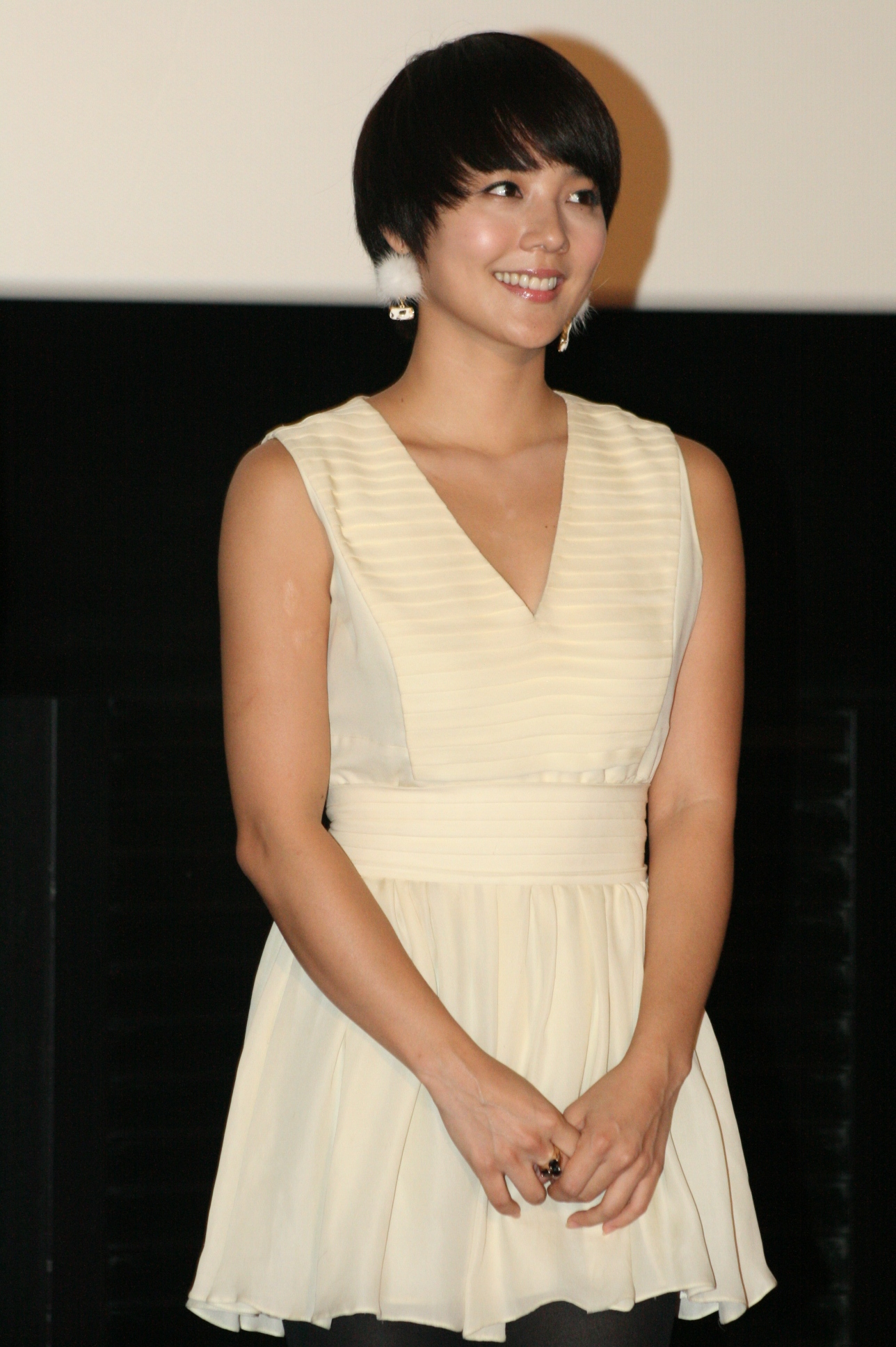
Eugene in 2008

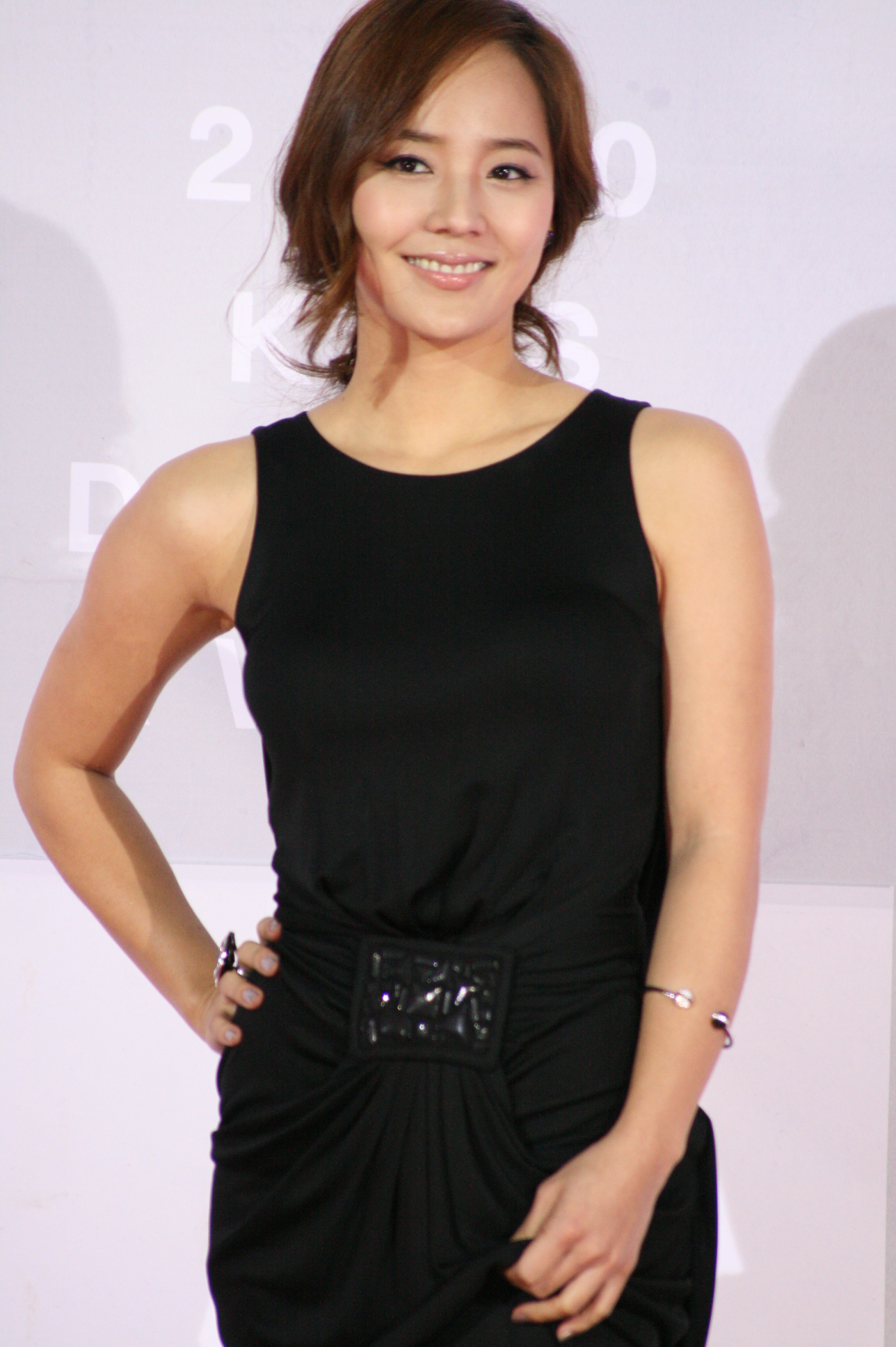
Eugene at the 2010 KBS Drama Awards

In 2007, Eugene took over from Lee Hyori as one of the co-hosts of the variety show Happy Together Friends, until the show was overhauled for a third season. After the success of her previous program Eugene's Makeup Diary, cable style network O'live again chose her as the host of new show Get It Beauty which began airing in July 2010.

Eugene has authored two books: Eugene's Beauty Secrets and Eugene's Get It Beauty. She is also the co-president of the clothing brand byMOMO.

In 2012, she became the host of season 3 of MBC's revamped flagship amateur singing competition show The Great Birth. Her next leading role was in the 2013 weekend family drama A Hundred Year Legacy, which reached ratings of over 30 percent. She then starred in two more family dramas, Can We Fall in Love, Again? and All About My Mom.

On December 17, 2018, it was announced that Eugene had signed with INN Company after deciding not to renew her contract with C9 Entertainment.

In 2020, she appeared in TV series The Penthouse: War in Life aired on SBS TV from October 26.

On August 12, 2022, Eugene held a fan sign event in front of the Lotte World Mall Jamsil store.

== Personal life ==
=== Marriage and family ===
On May 11, 2011, Eugene announced that she would be married to Ki Tae-young, her leading man in the 2009 TV series Creating Destiny. Their wedding was held at the Seoul Central Church in Anyang, Gyeonggi-do, on July 23, 2011. They were the first couple featured on Super Couple Diary, a reality show filming the daily married life of celebrity couples. Eugene gave birth to their first child, a daughter named Lohee on April 12, 2015. She also gave birth to another girl, Lorin, on August 18, 2018.

=== Beliefs ===
After the sinking of the MV Sewol, fans of Eugene began to doubt her belief in the Evangelical Baptist Church of Korea. She explained she is not a believer of the Evangelical Baptist Church, but in the Korean Christianity Baptist Church, which separated from the Evangelical Baptist Church 32 years ago.

== Discography ==
=== Studio albums ===
Title	Album details	Peak chart positions	Sales
Title	Album details	KOR	Sales
My True Style...	Released: May 30, 2003; Label: F&J Entertainment; Formats: CD, digital download; Track listing: 1. The Best; 2. Cha Cha (차 차); 3. Rainy Day; 4. You And I 5. Bad Boy; 6. Feel Me; 7. Good-Bye (사랑인가요); 8. Sweet Babe; 9. Lovely Day; 10. Stay With Me; 11. Regret (후회); 12. My Best Friend; 13. 늘 처음처럼 (Loving You); 14. 기억해요 (Remember Me) (Bonus Track); 15. Jesus Loves Me (Bonus Track)	10	KOR: 54,270
810303	Released: August 18, 2004; Label: Kakao M; Formats: CD, digital download; Track listing: 1. Wuthering Heights (폭풍의 언덕); 2. Windy; 3. I'm sorry.. I'm sorry..(미안한건..서러운건..); 4. Pleeez; 5. Happy Time; 6. Pandora; 7. Late Love (늦은 사랑); 8. Relax; 9. Remote Control; 10. My Dream; 11. How About You? (넌 어떠니?); 12. A Parting Shot (이별이 내게 주는 것); 13. Windy (Remix); 14. 810303 (To Be Continued)	9	KOR: 25,245

=== Soundtrack contributions ===
Title	Year	Peak positions	Album
Title	Year	KOR	Album
"Narration" (with Park Yong-ha)	2002	—	Loving You OST
"Love Montage" (with Park Yong-ha)	2002	—	Loving You OST
"Salang...geu Cheosneukkim" (사랑...그 첫느낌) (with Park Yong-ha)	2002	—	Loving You OST
"Dalaeui Tema (Chorus Ver.)" (다래의 테마)	2002	—	Loving You OST
"My Dream"	2004	—	Save the Last Dance for Me OST
"Like Candy" (캔디처럼)	2006	—	I Really Really Like You OST
"I like you" (좋아해) (duet with Mr. Burn)	2006	—	I Really Really Like You OST
"Jeongseon Arirang" (정선 아리랑)	2006	—	I Really Really Like You OST
"Romantic Christmas" (로맨틱 크리스마스) (duet with Lee Sun-kyun)	2008	—	Romantic Island Christmas story OST
"Plastic syndrome" (플라스틱 신드롬)	2008	—	Romantic Island OST
"Travel Memories" (추억여행)	2008	—	Romantic Island OST
"—" denotes release did not chart.

=== Participation in albums ===
Title	Year	Peak positions	Album
Title	Year	KOR	Album
"Shout to the Lord" (내 구주 예수님)	2001	—	The Gift
"Rudolph The Red Nosed Reindeer"	2004	—	Christmas With Pfull
"—" denotes release did not chart.

== Filmography ==
=== Film ===
Year	Title	Role
2007	Unstoppable Marriage	Park Eun-ho
2008	Heartbreak Library	Jo Eun-soo
2008	Romantic Island	Yoo Ga-young
2009	Yoga Hakwon	Hyo-jung
2020	Paper Flower	Go Eun-sook

=== Television series ===
Year	Title	Role	Notes	Ref.
2002	Loving You	Jin Da-rae		
2004	Save the Last Dance for Me	Ji Eun-soo		
2005	Wonderful Life	Jung Se-jin		
2006	Love Truly	Yeo Bong-soon		
2008	One Mom and Three Dads	Song Na-young		
2009	Creating Destiny	Han Sang-eun		
2010	Bread, Love and Dreams	Shin Yoo-kyung		
2011	KBS Drama Special	Princess Hwapyung	Episode: "Princess Hwapyung's Weight Loss"	
2012	Ohlala Couple	Min-young	Cameo appearance (Ep. 2)	
2013	A Hundred Year Legacy	Min Chae-won		
2014	Can We Fall in Love, Again?	Yoon Jung-wan		
2015	All About My Mom	Lee Jin-ae		
2020–2021	The Penthouse: War in Life	Oh Yoon-hee		
2025	First Lady	Cha Soo-yeon		

=== Television show ===
Year	Title	Notes
2002	Saturday is Coming	Host
2003	Nam Hui-seok and Eugene's Love Story	Host
2005	Happy Together Friends	Host
2009	Living Beauty - Eugene's Makeup Diary, Season 1	Host
2012	Super Couple Diary	Host
2012	The Great Birth - Season 3	Host
2010–2014	O'live TV Get It Beauty	Host
2016	The Return of Superman	Ep 114 - Ep 210
2022	The Battle for Move-in: Penthouse	Tenant
2022	Oh! My Wedding	Wedding planner
2022	Hot Goodbye	Host

=== Web shows ===
Year	Title	Role	Notes	Ref.
2022	Half of Me	Narrator	Good Neighbors YouTube channel	

=== Hosting ===
Year	title	Notes	Ref.
2023	30th Hanteo Music Awards	with Shin Dong-yup	

== Musical theatre ==
Year	Title	Role
2007	Innocent Steps	Chae-rin

== Bibliography ==
- Eugene's Beauty Secrets (2009)
- Eugene's Get It Beauty (2011)

== Awards and nominations ==
Name of the award ceremony, year presented, category, nominee of the award, and the result of the nomination
Award ceremony	Year	Category	Nominee / work	Result	Ref.
APAN Star Awards	2013	Excellence Award, Actress	A Hundred Year Legacy	Nominated	
KBS Drama Awards	2002	Best New Actress	Loving You	Nominated	
KBS Drama Awards	2002	Popularity Award	Loving You	Won	
KBS Drama Awards	2010	Excellence Award, Actress in a Serial Drama	Bread, Love and Dreams	Won	
KBS Drama Awards	2011	Best Actress in a One-Act/Special/Short Drama	Princess Hwapyung's Weight Loss	Won	
KBS Drama Awards	2015	Excellence Award, Actress in a Serial Drama	All About My Mom	Won	
KBS Drama Awards	2015	Best Couple Award	Eugene (with Lee Sang-woo) (All About My Mom)	Nominated	
KBS Drama Awards	2015	Netizen Award, Actress	All About My Mom	Nominated	
Korea Best Dresser Awards	1999	Best Dressed, Female Singer	Eugene	Won	
Korea Drama Awards	2013	Excellence Award, Actress	A Hundred Year Legacy	Nominated	
Korea Visual Arts Festival	2004	Photogenic Award, Singer	Eugene	Won	
MBC Drama Awards	2005	Excellence Award, Actress	Wonderful Life	Nominated	
MBC Drama Awards	2005	Popularity Award	Wonderful Life	Nominated	
MBC Drama Awards	2013	Top Excellence Award, Actress in a Serial Drama	A Hundred Year Legacy	Nominated	
MBC Drama Awards	2013	Best Couple Award	Eugene (with Lee Jung-jin) (A Hundred Year Legacy)	Nominated	
MBC Drama Awards	2013	Popularity Award	A Hundred Year Legacy	Nominated	
Mnet KM Music Festival	2005	PD's Choice Special Award	Eugene	Won	
SBS Drama Awards	2004	Top Excellence Award, Actress	Save the Last Dance for Me	Nominated	
SBS Drama Awards	2004	New Star Award	Save the Last Dance for Me	Won	
SBS Drama Awards	2020	Top Excellence Award, Actress in a Mid-Length Drama	The Penthouse: War in Life	Won	
SBS Drama Awards	2021	Top Excellence Award, Actress in a Miniseries Genre/Fantasy Drama	The Penthouse: War in Life 2 and 3	Nominated	
Seoul International Drama Awards	2021	Outstanding Korean Actress	The Penthouse: War in Life	Nominated	
