= Jin Tae-hyun =

South Korean actor (born 1981)

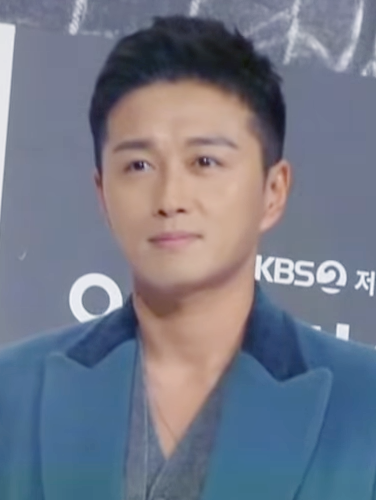
- Jin in 2018
- Born: Kim Tae-hyun; February 15, 1981 (age 45); Seoul, South Korea
- Education: Seoul Institute of the Arts - Theater
- Occupation: Actor
- Years active: 2001–present
- Agent: Signal Entertainment Group
- Spouse: Park Si-eun (m. 2015)
- Children: 1 (adopted)

Korean name
- Hangul: 김태현
- RR: Gim Taehyeon
- MR: Kim T'aehyŏn

Stage name
- Hangul: 진태현
- RR: Jin Taehyeon
- MR: Chin T'aehyŏn

Kim Tae-hyun (Korean: 김태현, born February 15, 1981), known professionally as Jin Tae-hyun (진태현), is a South Korean actor.

== Personal life ==
In December 2014, Jin announced his engagement to his Pure Pumpkin Flower co-star Park Si-eun. The couple got married in July 2015.

In 2019, Jin and his wife announced that they had adopted a teenage girl whom they had met at an orphanage four years prior. On February 21, 2022, he announced that his wife was pregnant after having had two miscarriages. Later, in August, he announced that his wife had miscarried 20 days before her due date.

== Filmography ==
=== Films ===
Year	Title	Role	Notes
2004	100 Days with Mr. Arrogant	Yeong-eun	
2004	Spin Kick	Jung-dae	
2005	All for Love	Min Tae-hyun	
2005	Blue Swallow	Kang Se-gi	
2006	See You After School	Ma Yun-sung	
2007	Temptation of Eve: A Good Wife	Jin-young	
2007	Two Faces of My Girlfriend	Shi-hoo	
2007	Bank Attack		
2008	Crazy Waiting	Jae-hyun	
2008	Dream	Ran's former lover	
2012	Horror Stories	Park Doo-ho	segment: "Endless Flight"

=== Television series ===
Year	Title	Role	Notes/Ref.
1996	Start		
2002	Present		
2002	Since We Met	Kim Soo-jin	
2002	Romance		
2003	Good News	Jung Philip	
2003	Cats on the Roof	Joon-ho	
2004	Drama City		Episode "Cafe Eve"
2005	Take My Hand	Lieutenant Kim	
2005	Ballad of Seodong	Yoo-rim	
2006	The Snow Queen	Choi Choong-sik	
2007	Drama City	Jo Sang-gu	Episode "Human Scumbag Gae Sang-gu"
2007	S Clinic	Dr. Hoo	Super Action
2008	You Stole My Heart	Bae Ji-hoon	
2008	White Lie	Kang Hyung-woo	
2009	Temptation of an Angel	Nam Joo-seung	
2010	Pure Pumpkin Flower	Yoo Min-soo	
2011	Paradise Ranch		(cameo)
2011	Gyebaek	Gyo-ki	
2011	Insu, the Queen Mother	Prince Yeonsan	
2012	Feast of the Gods	Ha In-woo	
2012	KBS Drama Special	Lee Se-hyun	Episode "Glass Prison"
2012	Here Comes Mr. Oh	Jin Yong-seok	
2013	All About My Romance	Kim Sang-soo	
2013	Drama Festival	Prince Changwon	Episode "Unrest"
2013	Hold My Hand	Min Jung-hyun	
2014	Hotel King	Roman Lee	
2015	My Daughter, Geum Sa-wol		
2016	Monster	Do Kwang-woo	
2019	Left-Handed Wife	Kim Nam-joon	
2023	Twinkling Watermelon	adult Noh Se-beom	Cameo (episode 16)

=== Television shows ===
Year	Title	Role	Ref.
2020, 2022	Same Bed, Different Dreams 2: You Are My Destiny	Cast Member	

== Ambassadorship ==
- The 7th Sponsor of the Companion Club (2022)

== Awards and nominations ==
Year	Award	Category	Nominated work	Result
2005	13th Chunsa Film Art Awards	Best New Actor	All for Love	Won
2009	SBS Drama Awards	New Star Award	Temptation of an Angel	Won
2011	SBS Drama Awards	Special Award, Actor in a Weekend/Daily Drama	Pure Pumpkin Flower	Won
2013	MBC Drama Awards	Excellence Award, Actor in a Serial Drama	Hold My Hand	Nominated
