= Silver Stallion (1991 film) =

- Poster for Silver Stallion (1991)
- Hangul: 은마는 오지 않는다
- Hanja: 銀馬는 오지 않는다
- RR: Eunmaneun oji anneunda
- MR: Ŭnmanŭn oji annŭnda
- Directed by: Jang Kil-su
- Written by: Jang Kil-su; Cho Jai-hong
- Based on: Silver Stallion by Ahn Jung-hyo
- Produced by: Han Gap-jin
- Starring: Lee Hye-sook; Kim Bo-yeon
- Cinematography: Lee Seok-ki
- Edited by: Kim Hee-su
- Music by: Kim Soo-chul
- Distributed by: Han Jin Enterprises Co., Ltd.
- Release date: October 3, 1991
- Running time: 123 minutes
- Country: South Korea
- Language: Korean

Silver Stallion (Korean: 은마는 오지 않는다; RR: Eunmaneun oji anneunda; lit. 'The Silver Stallion Will Never Come') is a 1991 South Korean film based on the novel by Ahn Jung-hyo.

== Synopsis ==
Soldiers with the U.N. forces that entered Korea during the Korean War rape a village girl named Eon-rae. The villagers ostracize Eon-rae and her son. Unable to make a living, Eon-rae joins the brothel district that has been set up near the U.N. base on the other side of the river from the village. The war and the introduction of U.S. culture break down the social order of the village. After several village children have died, the villagers put the blame on the prostitutes. Eventually the villagers, unable to maintain the village, leave their homes one by one. Eon-rae and her son also leave.

== Cast ==
- Lee Hye-sook... Eon-rae
- Kim Bo-yeon... Yong-nyeo
- Jeon Moo-song... Hwang Hun-jang
- Son Chang-min... Seok-gu
- Yang Taek-jo... Lee Jang
- Bang Eun-hee... Soon-deok
- Lee Dae-ro... Chan Dol-bu
- Kim Hyeong-ja... Chan Dol-mo
- Lee Ki-young... Kang Ho-bu
- Hong Yun-jeong... Kang Ho-mo

== Awards ==
Montréal World Film Festival (1991)

- Best Actress: Lee Hye-sook
- Best Screenplay: Jang Kil-su, Cho Jai-hong

Baeksang Arts Awards (1991)

- Best Film
- Best Actress: Lee Hye-sook

Korean Association of Film Critics Awards (1991)

- Best Actress: Lee Hye-sook

Blue Dragon Film Awards (1991)

- Best Director: Jang Kil-su
- Best Supporting Actress: Kim Bo-yeon

== Bibliography ==
- Kim, Kyung-hyun (2004). "3. 'Is This How the War is Remembered?': Violent Sex and the Korean War in Silver Stallion, Spring in My Hometown, and The Taebaek Mountains". The Remasculinization of Korean Cinema. Durham and London: Duke University Press. pp. 81–87. ISBN 0-8223-3267-1.
