= Save the Last Dance for Me (TV series) =

- Promotional poster
- Also known as: The Last Dance Is with Me
- Genre: Melodrama; Romance
- Written by: Cho Yoon-young; Ma Jin-won; Son Hwang-won
- Directed by: Lee Seung-ryul
- Starring: Ji Sung; Eugene; Ryu Soo-young; Lee Bo-young
- Composer: Edward Chun
- Country of origin: South Korea
- Original language: Korean
- No. of episodes: 20

Production
- Executive producer: Huh Woong
- Producer: Park Young-soo
- Editor: Kim Mi-kyung
- Running time: 60 minutes
- Production company: Logos Film

Original release
- Network: SBS TV
- Release: October 23, 2004 – January 2, 2005

Save the Last Dance for Me (Korean: 마지막 춤은 나와 함께; RR: Majimak chumeun nawa hamkke) is a 20-episode South Korean television series that aired on SBS from October 23, 2004 to January 2, 2005 on Saturdays and Sundays at 21:45. Starring Ji Sung, Eugene, Ryu Soo-young and Lee Bo-young. The drama revolves around two lovers who don't let amnesia get in the way of their romance.

== Plot ==
Hyun-woo (Ji Sung) is the reluctant heir to his father's chemical company and engaged to be married to Soo-jin (Lee Bo-young). Eun-soo (Eugene) lives a simple life, running a bed and breakfast with her elderly father. Their paths cross one fateful night when, after a failed attempt on his life, Hyun-woo loses his memory in a car accident. Discovered on the roadside by Eun-soo and her father, they take him in, nursing him back to health. Over the course of his recovery, Eun-soo and Hyun-woo (whom she has named "Baek Chang-ho") fall in love.

On the day of their engagement, Eun-soo's father passes away. Following another attempt on Hyun-woo's life and a resulting accident, Hyun-woo regains his memory but forgets the year he spent with Eun-soo and leaves her to seek out his past life.

Eun-soo, in her determination to find her lost love, travels to the city where she meets Hyun-woo, who, in turn, gradually falls in love with her again. A close confidant of Hyun-woo, Tae-min, is revealed as a traitor seeking to gain control of Hyun-woo's company. Tae-min is ultimately exposed and Hyun-woo regains ownership of the company.

In a final, desperate attempt to get revenge on Hyun-woo, Tae-min tries to run him over, but instead of Hyun-woo, Eun-soo shows up and this accident paralyzes her from waist down. Refusing to be a burden to Hyun-woo, Eun-soo disappears to work as a teacher at a home for physically challenged children, until after a year of searching, Hyun-woo sees a familiar drawing, and the lovers reunite. The final credits show Eun-soo learning to walk again with Hyun-woo's assistance.

== Cast ==
=== Main characters ===
Ji Sung as Kang Hyun-woo
Hyun-woo is the heir to a large Korean conglomerate. He loses his memory after a failed attempt on his life by Tae-min, a rival who wants control of the company. He is affectionately called "Baek Chang-ho" by Eun-soo when he could not recall his name.
Eugene as Ji Eun-soo
Eun-soo falls in love with Hyun-woo while helping him recover his memory and they were engaged to be married before he vanishes. She searches for him and works in his company, determined to try to get him to remember the time he spent with her.
Ryu Soo-young as Jung Tae-min
Tae-min is a confidant of Hyun-woo's father. He is loyal to the family and is a hardworking guy but there's more to him than meets the eye. Every decision he makes is a ploy to deceive Hyun-woo's family in order to take control of the company. He falls in love with Eun-soo in the middle of the drama.
Lee Bo-young as Yoon Soo-jin
Soo-jin was Hyun-woo's fiancée-to-be. Even after the "death" of Hyun-woo, she's still devoted to him and waited for his return. At first she was nice and caring, until Eun-soo steps into the picture which drove Soo-jin to the point where she tries to commit suicide.

=== Supporting characters ===
- Lee Hye-young as Kang Hyun-jung
- Kim Mu-saeng as Chairman Kang
- Kim Young-ran as Ms. Park
- Park In-hwan as Eun-soo's father
- Kim Min-jung as Ms. Oh
- Kim Min-joo as Ahn Jang-mi
- Ahn Sun-young as Choo Sun-young
- Suh Kyung Suk as Park Ho-jin
- Kim Hong-pyo as Choi Suk-koo
- Kang Ji-hwan as Shin Jung-kyu
- Shin Kwi-sik as Yoon Ui-won
- Kim Hyung-ja as Ms. Son Yoo-rim
- Kim Byung-ki as Boss Joo Sa-rang

== Remakes ==
There are three unofficial remakes: Indonesia's Aku Bukan Untukmu ("I'm not for you") in 2005; Taiwan's The Prince Who Turns into a Frog in 2005; and Mainland China's Waking Love Up in 2011.
