= Jeon In-hwa =

South Korean actress (born 1965)

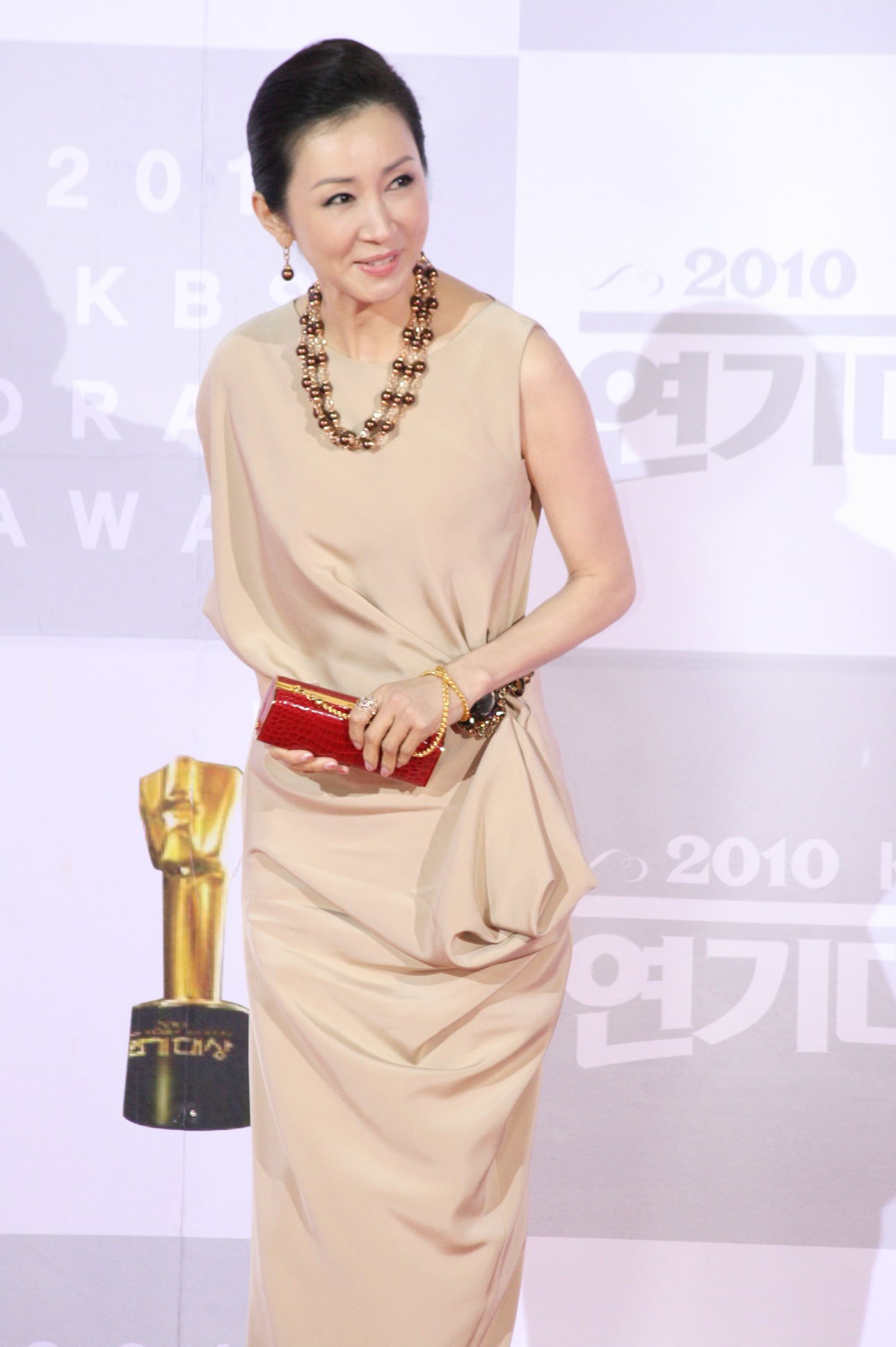
- Jeon in 2010
- Born: October 27, 1965 (age 60); Mungyeong, South Korea
- Education: Chung-Ang University - B.A. in Theater and Film
- Occupation: Actress
- Years active: 1984–present
- Agent: IWill_Media
- Spouse: Yoo Dong-geun (m. 1989)
- Children: 2

Korean name
- Hangul: 전인화
- Hanja: 錢忍和
- RR: Jeon Inhwa
- MR: Chŏn Inhwa

Jeon In-hwa (Korean: 전인화; born October 27, 1965), is a South Korean actress. She made her acting debut in 1985, and became best known for playing charismatic empresses in period dramas, notably in Ladies of the Palace for which she won the Grand Prize (or Daesang) at the 2001 SBS Drama Awards and Best TV Actress at the 2002 Baeksang Arts Awards. In recent years, Jeon has also starred in the contemporary dramas Again, My Love (2009), Bread, Love and Dreams (2010), Feast of the Gods (2012), My Daughter, Geum Sa-wol (2015), Homemade Love Story.

== Personal life ==
Jeon is married to actor Yoo Dong-geun. They have one son and one daughter.

== Filmography ==
=== Television drama ===
Year	Title	Role
1985	Stars on the Prairie	
1986	Im Illera Im Illera	
1987	Wondapung	
1987	Eldest Sister-in-law	
1987	Buy It Together	
1988	500 Years of Joseon: Queen Inhyeon	Hui-bin Jang
1989	Second Republic	Ko Yong Hui
1989	The Forest Does Not Sleep	
1989	Impatiens Flower Standing Under The Fence	
1990	Mother of Mine	
1990	Years of Ambition	Woo-heee
1994	How to Live with a Man	
1995	Until We Meet Again	Oh Ha-young
1995	Fourth Republic	Yuk Young-soo
1996	Sibling Relations	Soon-ok
1997	Because I Really	Jeon Ok-ja
1998	Married 7 Years	
1998	Letters Written on a Cloudy Day	
2001	Ladies of the Palace	Queen Munjeong
2007	The King and I	Queen Dowager Insoo
2009	Again, My Love	Eun Hye-jung
2010	Bread, Love and Dreams	Seo In-sook
2012	Feast of the Gods	Sung Do-hee
2013	A Hundred Year Legacy	Yang Choon-hee
2014	4 Legendary Witches	Cha Aeng-ran
2015	My Daughter, Geum Sa-wol	Shin Deuk-ye
2020	Homemade Love Story	Lee Soon-jung

=== Film and television shows ===
Year	Title	Role	Notes
2007	Aega (Love Song)		Short film
2010	King of Baking		Special Show
2011	Star Date		KBS world
2012	Win Win		Variety Show
2015	Healing Camp Aren't You Happy		Talk Show
2016	Star Date		KBS world
2019–2020	Naturally	Main Cast	MBN
2019	Those Who Cross the Line	Special Guest Season-3	MBC
2020	Knowing Bros	EP-249	JTBC

== Endorsements ==
Year	Product
1984	Binggrae
1985	Haitai Oh! Yes
1986	Julia Cosmetics
1989	Daewoo Electronics Microwave
1990–1992	Sajo
1990	Kumkang LesMore
1990	CJ
1992	CJ Lion Beat
1993	Samsung Electronics
1993–1995	Ssangyong C&B
1994–1995	Univera Cosmetics
1995–1996	LG Household & Healthcare
1995	Hanssem
1995	Hanwha L & C
1996	LG Electronics
1997	LG Hausys
1997	Samil
1997	Elcanto
1997	Tongyang Inc.
1997	Haitai Beverage
1997–2004	AmorePacific Group
1999–2001	Dongsuh - Maxim Coffee
1999	Samsung Fire & Marine Insurance
2000	Vortec
2000	MAT
2001	Ae Kyung
2001	Daesang Corporation
2002–2007	동문건설
2003	Hanwha Life Insurance
2003	Woongjin Coway
2007	LG Household & Healthcare
2009	LG Cyon
2010	ROSĒE Cosmetics

== Accolades ==
=== Awards and nominations ===
Year	Award	Category	Nominated work	Result
1989	MBC Drama Awards	Top Excellence Award, Actress		Won
1989	올해의 건치연예인상			Won
2001	37th Baeksang Arts Awards	Most Popular Actress (TV)	Ladies of the Palace	Won
2001	SBS Drama Awards	Grand Prize (Daesang)	Ladies of the Palace	Won
2001	SBS Drama Awards	Top 10 Stars	Ladies of the Palace	Won
2002	38th Baeksang Arts Awards	Best Actress (TV)	Ladies of the Palace	Won
2002	29th Korea Broadcasting Awards	Best Actress	Ladies of the Palace	Won
2009	KBS Drama Awards	Top Excellence Award, Actress	Again, My Love	Nominated
2010	KBS Drama Awards	Top Excellence Award, Actress	Bread, Love and Dreams	Won
2011	47th Baeksang Arts Awards	Best Actress (TV)	Bread, Love and Dreams	Nominated
2012	MBC Drama Awards	Golden Acting Award, Actress	Feast of the Gods	Won
2013	MBC Drama Awards	Best Couple Award with Jeong Bo-seok	A Hundred Year Legacy	Nominated
2015	MBC Drama Awards	Top Excellence Award, Actress in a Special Project Drama	My Daughter, Geum Sa-wol, 4 Legendary Witches	Won
2020	KBS Drama Awards	Top Excellence Award, Actress	Homemade Love Story	Nominated
2020	KBS Drama Awards	Excellence Award, Actress in a Serial Drama	Homemade Love Story	Nominated

=== State honors ===
Name of country, year given, and name of honor
Country	Year	Honor	Ref.
South Korea (Note: Honors are given at the Korean Popular Culture and Arts Awards, arranged by the Korea Creative Content Agency and hosted by the Ministry of Culture, Sports and Tourism. They are awarded to those who have contributed to the arts and South Korea's pop culture.)	2011	Minister of Culture, Sports and Tourism Commendation	
