= Take Care of My Dad =

- Genre: Variety show
- Starring: Lee Kyung-kyu; Kang Seok-woo; Cho Jae-hyun; Jo Min-ki
- Country of origin: South Korea
- Original language: Korean
- No. of seasons: 1

Production
- Production location: South Korea
- Running time: 80 minutes

Original release
- Network: SBS
- Release: February 19 – February 20, 2015 (pilot), March 21, 2015 – November 1, 2015

Take Care of My Dad (Korean: 아빠를 부탁해) is a 2015 South Korean television program starring Lee Kyung-kyu, Kang Seok-woo, Cho Jae-hyun and Jo Min-ki. It airs on SBS on Sunday at 16:50 beginning April 21, 2015.
