= Unstoppable Marriage (TV series) =

2007–2008 South Korean TV series

- Promotional poster
- Also known as: The Fated Wedding; Unstoppable Wedding
- Hangul: 못말리는 결혼
- RR: Monmallineun gyeolhon
- MR: Monmallinŭn kyŏrhon
- Genre: Romance, Comedy
- Based on: Unstoppable Marriage by Kim Young-chan, Kang Soo-jin, Yu Nam-gyeong
- Written by: Ma Seok-cheol; Bang Bong-won; Kim Yong-rae
- Directed by: Lee Kyo-wook; Jo Joon-hee
- Starring: Kim Soo-mi; Im Chae-moo; Seo Do-young; Park Chae-kyung; Lee Jung; Kim Dong-wook
- Country of origin: South Korea
- Original language: Korean
- No. of episodes: 140

Production
- Producer: Lee Kyo-wook
- Running time: Mondays to Fridays at 18:50 (KST)
- Production companies: Pan Entertainment; POIBOS Co. Ltd.

Original release
- Network: Korean Broadcasting System
- Release: November 5, 2007 – May 30, 2008

Unstoppable Marriage (Korean: 못말리는 결혼) is a South Korean sitcom that aired on KBS2 from November 5, 2007, to May 30, 2008, on Mondays to Fridays at 18:50 for 140 episodes. It was adapted from the 2007 South Korean film of the same name.

== Plot ==
Madam Shim has four sons: Ki-baek, Yi-baek, Sam-baek, and Sa-baek. The eldest son, Ki-baek falls in love with Goo Mi-ho, the daughter of Madam Shim's enemy, Goo Gook. Third son Sam-beak becomes friends with Chae Soo-jung, a hotel management student at his mother's hotel, but things become complicated when he and older brother Yi-baek both fall for her. Soo-young and Yu-ri both have a crush on fourth son Sa-baek, but he doesn't return their feelings and constantly ignores them.

== Cast ==
=== Main characters ===
- Kim Soo-mi as Shim Mal-nyeon (Madam Shim)
- Im Chae-moo as Goo Gook
- Seo Do-young as Wang Ki-baek (1st son)
- Park Chae-kyung as Goo Mi-ho
- Lee Jung as Wang Yi-baek (2nd son)
- Kim Dong-wook as Wang Sam-baek (3rd son)
- Jung Da-young as Chae Soo-jung
- Lee Jae-jin as Wang Sa-baek (4th son)

=== Supporting characters ===
- Choi Soo-young as Soo-young
- Kwon Yu-ri as Yu-ri
- Kim Hye-na as Goo Hye-joo
- Yoo Yeon-mi as Kim Ok-hee
- Kim Jung-wook as Cha Joon-ho
- Han Tae-yoon as Park Sang-mi
- Park Jin-woo as Goo Jong-jae
- Lee Ji-sook as Lee Han-nyeo
- Hwang Hye-young as Nurse Jung
- Mika as Nurse Oh
- Kim Byung-choon as Lee Young-chul
- Lee In-chul as Manager Jong
- Lee In-hye as Park Eun-young
- Lee Yong-joo as Jo Chan-joo
- Kim Isak as Aida
- F.T. Island (Lee Hong-gi, Choi Min-hwan, Choi Jong-hoon, Oh Won-bin) as Sa-baek's friends (cameo, episode 62)
- Girls' Generation (Taeyeon, Jessica Jung, Sunny, Tiffany Young, Kim Hyo-yeon, Im Yoon-ah, Seohyun) as Bulgwang-dong's Seven Princesses Gang (cameo, episode 64)

== International broadcast ==
It aired on Japanese cable channel KBS Japan in June 2008.
