= Kang Seok-woo =

South Korean actor

- Born: Kang Man-heung; October 1, 1957 (age 68); Seoul, South Korea
- Education: Dongguk University - Theater and Film
- Occupations: Actor; radio DJ
- Years active: 1978–present
- Spouse: Na Yeon-shin

Korean name
- Hangul: 강만흥
- Hanja: 康萬興
- RR: Gang Manheung
- MR: Kang Manhŭng

Stage name
- Hangul: 강석우
- Hanja: 康石雨
- RR: Gang Seoku
- MR: Kang Sŏgu

Kang Seok-woo (born Kang Man-heung on October 1, 1957) is a South Korean actor. He made his acting debut in 1978 in the Kim Soo-yong film Yeosu (The Loneliness of the Journey), then starred in his first television drama Ordinary People in 1982. Kang was most active on the big screen in the 1980s, but has worked exclusively in television since 1995. He has also displayed his artwork in several exhibitions.

== Filmography ==
=== Film ===
Year	Title	Role
1979	Yeosu (The Loneliness of the Journey)	
1980	Weak Mind	
1981	Rainy Season	Maternal uncle Gil-joon
1982	Tanya	
1984	The Stranger	
1986	Winter Wanderer	Min-woo
1987	The Winter of the Kiwi	Moon-do
1987	The Home of Two Women	Kang Min-joon
1988	Dangerous Scent (Married Couple)	Seok-woo
1989	Wound	
1989	25 Dollar People	
1990	Going Out at Dawn	Sung-yoon
1990	Madame Freedom 1990	Shin Choon-ho
1991	Lost Love	Uhm Choong-sik
1992	Walking All the Way to Heaven	Jung-man
1992	Jazz Bar Hiroshima	Geon-woo
1994	Pro at Love, Amateur at Marriage	
1995	Mom, the Star, and the Sea Anemone	(cameo)
1995	Piano in Winter	Jin-woo
2015	He Who Loves the World	Documentary narrator

=== Television series ===
Year	Title	Role	Network
1982	Ordinary People		KBS1
1984	The Person I Love		KBS1
1984	TV Tale of Chunhyang	Lee Mong-ryong	KBS2
1987	Face of the City	Lee Myung-hoo	MBC
1988	500 Years of Joseon: Queen Inhyeon	King Sukjong	MBC
1991	Beyond the Mountains	Sang-woo	MBC
1991	The Royal Path	King Jeongjo	KBS1
1991	Honeymoon		KBS2
1992	Promise	Hyun-woo	MBC
1992	Morning Thaw	Lee Chae-hoon	SBS
1992	For Love	Seo Yoon-jae	KBS2
1994	The Lonely Man	Dr. Ryu Shi-hyung	KBS2
1994	That Window	Yoo Seung-ha	SBS
1995	Angel in Mask		KBS2
1995	Love Anthem	Lee Cheol-kyu	SBS
1995	Thaw		SBS
1996	Icing	Director Ahn	MBC
1996	Temptation	Kyung-hwan	KBS2
1998	Aim for Tomorrow	Hwang Jung-goo	MBC
1999	School	Yang Dong-chul	KBS2
2000	Look Back in Anger	Hwang Byung-ki	KBS2
2000	Ajumma	Jang Jin-gu	MBC
2000	Love Cruise		KBS2
2001	How Should I Be	Gong Byung-dae	MBC
2001	Wonderful Days	Yoon Ji-ho	SBS
2002	Confession	Park Sang-il	MBC
2003	Not Divorced	Song Ji-seok	KBS2
2003	Sharp 1	Lee Sang-heum	KBS2
2004	Love Is All Around	Yeon Sung-hoon	MBC
2004	The Age of Heroes	Cheon Il-guk	MBC
2005	Sharp 2	Lee Sang-heum	KBS2
2005	Wedding	Lee Jung-il	KBS2
2006	Sharp 3	Lee Sang-heum	KBS2
2006	Hearts of Nineteen	Hong Poong-goo	KBS1
2007	Landscape in My Heart	Na Pan-soo	KBS1
2008	You Are My Destiny	Kim Dae-gu	KBS1
2009	Smile, You	Seo Jung-gil	SBS
2010	Smile Again	Kim Joon	KBS1
2012	Can We Get Married?	Dong-gun	jTBC
2013	A Little Love Never Hurts	Song Ho-seob	MBC
2014	Glorious Day	Seo Min-sik	SBS
2017	My Father Is Strange	Cha Gyu-taek	KBS2
2019	Home for Summer	Joo Yong-jin	KBS1

=== Variety/radio show ===
Year	Title	Notes
1997	Hello, This Is Kang Boo-ja and Kang Seok-woo	DJ
2001–2003	Happy Channel	Host
2007–present	Women's Era with Yang Hee-eun and Kang Seok-woo	DJ
2010–2013	Saturday Across Generations	Host
2012–2014	The Clinic for Married Couples: Love and War - Season 2	Member of mediation committee
	Scent of Sky with Kang Seok-woo and Kim Ja-ok	Host
2015	Take Care of My Dad	Cast member
2022	Kang Seok-woo's Trip to the End	Host

== Awards and nominations ==
Year	Award	Category	Nominated work	Result
1984	20th Baeksang Arts Awards	Best New Actor (TV)	Ordinary People	Won
1985	21st Baeksang Arts Awards	Best New Actor (Film)	The Stranger	Won
1987	26th Grand Bell Awards	Best Actor	The Home of Two Women	Nominated
1989	27th Grand Bell Awards	Best Actor	Dangerous Scent (Married Couple)	Nominated
1993	KBS Drama Awards	Top Excellence Award, Actor	For Love	Nominated
2001	37th Baeksang Arts Awards	Best Actor (TV)	How Should I Be?	Nominated
2001	37th Baeksang Arts Awards	Most Popular Actor (TV)	How Should I Be?	Won
2001	MBC Drama Awards	Top Excellence Award, Actor	How Should I Be?	Won
2008	15th Korean Entertainment Arts Awards	Best Radio Host	Women's Era	Won
2008	MBC Drama Awards	Excellence Award in Radio	Women's Era	Won
2009	SBS Drama Awards	Best Supporting Actor in a Special Planning Drama	Smile, You	Won
2011	MBC Entertainment Awards	Top Excellence Award in Radio	Women's Era	Won
2011	KBS Drama Awards	Excellence Award, Actor in a Daily Drama	Smile Again	Nominated
2012	24th Korea PD Awards	Best Performer, Radio Host category	Women's Era	Won
2014	SBS Drama Awards	Special Award, Actor in a Serial Drama	Glorious Day	Nominated
