= Park Si-eun (actress, born 1980) =

South Korean actress (born 1980)

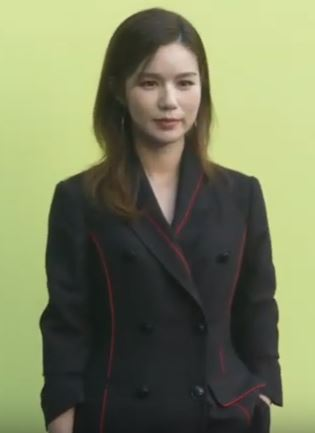
- Park in 2019
- Born: Park Eun-young; January 6, 1980 (age 46); Jung District, Seoul, South Korea
- Education: Dongduk Women's University - Broadcasting and Entertainment
- Occupation: Actress
- Years active: 1998–present
- Agent: PF Entertainment
- Spouse: Jin Tae-hyun (m. 2015)
- Children: 1 (adopted)

Korean name
- Hangul: 박은영
- Hanja: 朴恩英
- RR: Bak Eunyeong
- MR: Pak Ŭnyŏng

Stage name
- Hangul: 박시은
- Hanja: 朴詩恩
- RR: Bak Sieun
- MR: Pak Siŭn

Park Si-eun (Korean: 박시은; born January 6, 1980), birth name Park Eun-young, is a South Korean actress. She played leading roles in the television dramas It Was Love (2012) and Hold My Hand (2013).

== Personal life ==
In December 2014, Park announced her engagement to her Pure Pumpkin Flower co-star Jin Tae-hyun. The couple married in July 2015.

In 2019, Park and her husband announced that they had adopted a teenage girl whom they had met at an orphanage four years prior. On February 21, 2022, she announced that she was pregnant with her first child, after previously experiencing two miscarriages. However, on August 20, Jin Tae-hyun announced that Park has suffered an miscarriage 20 days before birth.

== Filmography ==
=== Television series ===
Year	Title	Role
1998	Kim Chang-wan's Three Tales	
1999	School 1	Chae Jung-ah
1999	Jump	
2000	Wang Rung's Land	Park Hwa-jung
2000	Nice Man	Lee Myung-ae
2000	Drama City: "Under the Cherry Tree"	
2000	Virtue	Shin Ae-ri
2000	Nonstop	
2000	Mom and Sister	Kwon Bo-ra
2001	Great Friends 2	
2001	Drama City: "Thanks to"	
2002	Present	Kyung-hee
2002	Hard Love	Jang Nan-young
2003	Drama City: "For Insomnia"	Seol-hwa
2004	Match Made in Heaven	Kim Jae-sun
2004	Toji, the Land	Yoo In-shil
2005	Sassy Girl Chun-hyang	Hong Chae-rin
2006	Dr. Kkang	Lee Hye-young
2006	Finding Dorothy	Na Kyung-joo
2009	The Iron Empress	Queen Wonjeong
2010	Pure Pumpkin Flower	Oh Sa-ra
2011	Bravo, My Love!	Nam Ji-eun (cameo)
2011	Just Like Today	Moon Hee-joo
2012	Father Is Sorry	Hye-ri
2012	To My Beloved	Kang Myung-jin
2012	It Was Love	Han Yoon-jin
2013	Hold My Hand	Han Yeon-soo
2014	Everybody Say Kimchi	Han Yoon-jin (cameo)
2016	Moon Lovers: Scarlet Heart Ryeo	Myung/Lady Hae
2017	Teacher Oh Soon-nam	Oh Soon-nam/Jang Sun-woo
2019	Everybody Say Kungdari	Song Bo-mi/Lee Bo-mi

=== Film ===
Year	Title	Role
2009	Autumn Story	

=== Television show ===
Year	Title	Notes/Ref.
2012	Law of the Jungle in Vanuatu	Cast member
2020, 2022	Same Bed, Different Dreams 2: You Are My Destiny	Cast Member

=== Music video appearances ===
Year	Song title	Artist
1998	"Hero"	Choi Chang-min
2007	"Invisible Tears"	Monday Kiz
2013	"Fly to the Sky"	Sohyang
2014	"Draw"	Sookhee

== Theater ==
Year	Title	Role
2008	Jesus, Jesus	Mary
2011	Alone in Love	Ha-ru

== Discography ==
=== Singles ===
Year	Song title	Notes
1999	"나 없는 세상에 남겨진 너에게 (Last Letter)"	duet with Choi Do-won; track from the album Flying...

== Ambassadorship ==
- The 7th Sponsor of the Companion Club (2022)

== Awards and nominations ==
Year	Award	Category	Nominated work	Result
2013	MBC Drama Awards	Excellence Award, Actress in a Serial Drama	Hold My Hand	Nominated
2014	MBC Drama Awards	Excellence Award, Actress in a Serial Drama	Hold My Hand	Nominated
2017	MBC Drama Awards	Top Excellence Award, Actress in a Soap Opera	Teacher Oh Soon-nam	Nominated
2019	MBC Drama Awards	Top Excellence Award, Actress in a Weekend/Daily Drama	Everybody Say Kungdari	Nominated
