= The Stranger (1984 film) =

- Hangul: 이방인
- Hanja: 異邦人
- RR: Ibangin
- MR: Ibangin
- Directed by: Lee Won-se
- Written by: Yeo Su-jung
- Produced by: Lee Woo-suk
- Starring: Kang Seok-woo; Lee Hye-sook; Ha Jae-young
- Cinematography: Park Seung-bae
- Edited by: Hyeon Dong-chun
- Music by: Han Sang-ki
- Release date: 1984
- Running time: 119 minutes
- Country: South Korea
- Language: Korean

The Stranger (Korean: 이방인; RR: Ibangin) is a South Korean film.

== Plot ==
Chairman's daughter Kang Ae-ri was kidnapped on her marriage by two men who worked with her father's rival then she falls in love with Jae-gu who one of kidnappers.

== Cast ==
- Kang Seok-woo
- Lee Hye-sook
- Ha Jae-young
- Bi Sang-gu
- Lee Chi-wu
- Choi Nam-Hyun
- Kim Bok-hee
- Sin Chan-il
- Park Bu-yang
- Han Tae-il
