= Park Won-sook =

South Korean actress (born 1949)

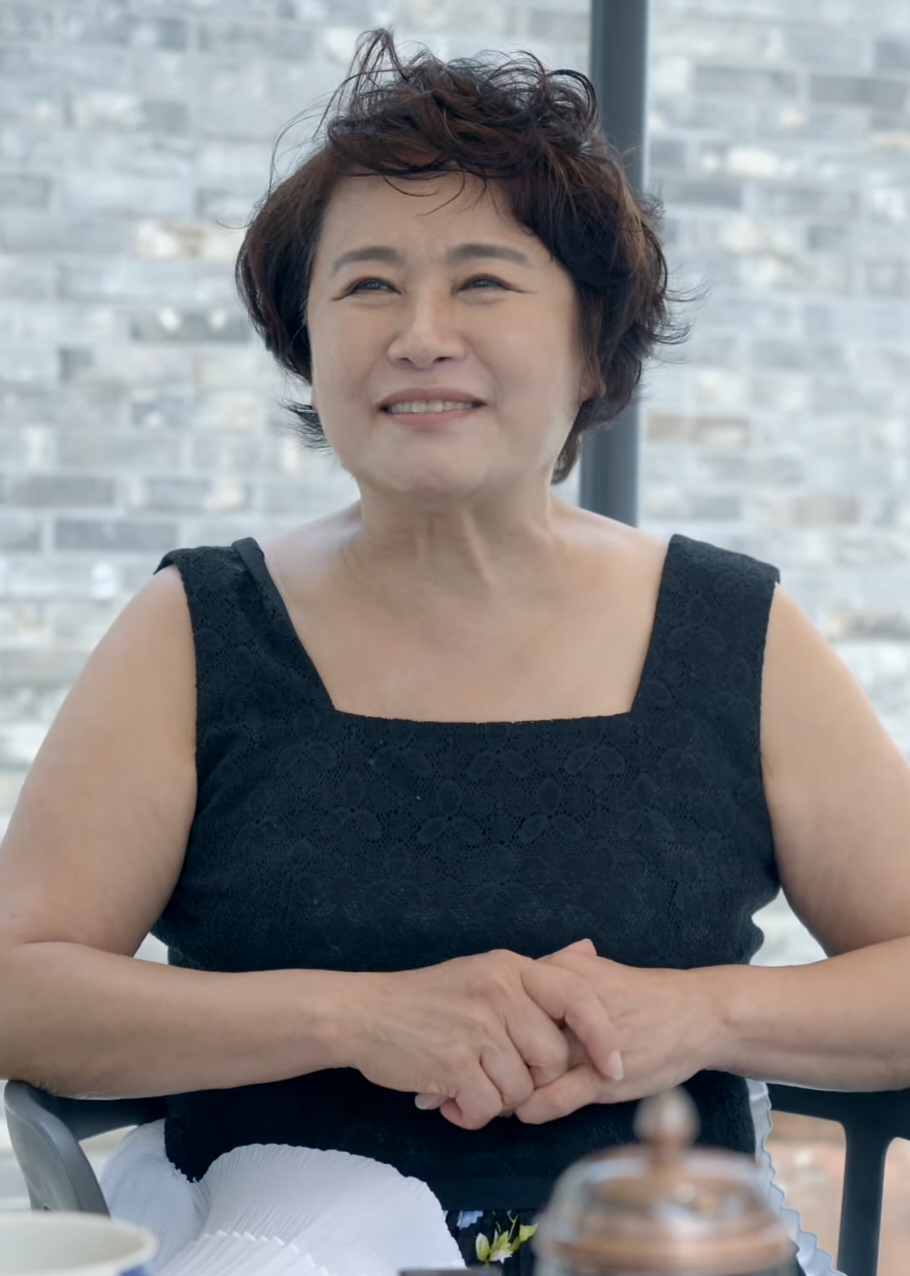
- Park in 2023
- Born: January 19, 1949 (age 77); Seoul, South Korea
- Education: Chung-Ang University – Theater and Film (dropped out)
- Occupation: Actress
- Years active: 1970–present
- Spouses: Unknown first husband (m. 1970; div. 1981) Unknown second husband (m. 1989; div. 1995)
- Children: 1
- Relatives: Park So-dam (cousin's granddaughter)

Korean name
- Hangul: 박원숙
- RR: Bak Wonsuk
- MR: Pak Wŏnsuk

Park Won-sook (Korean: 박원숙; born January 19, 1949) is a South Korean actress.

== Filmography ==
=== Television series ===
Year	Title	Role
1970	Brilliant Season	
1971	Chief Inspector	guest appearance
1974	Narcissus	
1974	Reed	Second daughter-in-law
1980	Lifetime in the Country	guest appearance
1981	Let's Love	
1981	Dad's Beard	
1982	Yesterday and Tomorrow	
1983	That Star is My Star	
1985	Mother's Room	
1985	500 Years of Joseon: "The Wind Orchid"	Park Gyeong-bin
1985	Man of the Season	Kim Jin-sook
1986	Three Families Under One Roof	Sundol-yi's mother
1987	The Land	Im Yi-ne
1987	Eldest Sister-in-law	
1989	Jo Myeong-ha	
1990	What Do Women Want	Aunt
1990	500 Years of Joseon: "Daewongun"	
1991	Magpie Daughter-in-law	Kang Min-seon
1991	Keep Your Voice Down	
1992	Small City	
1992	Ambitions on Sand	
1993	January	
1993	Theme Series: "A Thing Called Love"	
1994	Close One Eye	
1994	Way of Living: Woman	Ahn Woo-sook
1995	Seoul Nocturne	
1995	Apartment	
1995	LA Arirang	
1995	Between Big Men	
1995	In the Name of Love	
1996	Start	
1997	You and I	Mrs. Hong
1997	Star in My Heart	Mrs. Song
1997	Where Women Dwell	
1997	White Christmas	
1998	See and See Again	Song-ja
1998	Until the Azalea Blooms	
1998	Shy Lovers	Park Jin-ae
1999	Days of Delight	Goo Yoo-jung's mother
1999	Roses and Bean Sprouts	Myung-hee
1999	Tomato	Sung Young-sook
1999	I'm Still Loving You	Jang Ok-hee
2000	All About Eve	Mrs. Song
2000	Rookie	Yoon Sa-yeon
2000	Foolish Love	Kim Mi-sook
2001	Wonderful Days	Jang Seok-jin's mother
2001	Her House	Kim Dong-sook
2001	I Still Love You	Mrs. Kim
2001	Wuri's Family	Han Eun-ja
2001	Tender Hearts	Kim Jung-sook
2002	Romance	Yoon Mi-hee
2002	To Be With You	Yoon Hee-sook
2002	Rival	Oh Hye-ra
2003	All In	Jang Hyun-ja
2003	Pearl Necklace	Noh Soon-bok
2003	A Problem at My Younger Brother's House	Oh Jeom-soon
2003	Escape from Unemployment	Lee Jung-ae
2004	Into the Storm	Kang In-joo
2004	Ms. Kim's Million Dollar Quest	Park Moo-yeol's mother
2004	Tropical Nights in December	Na Ae-sook
2004	My 19 Year Old Sister-in-Law	Im Cheong-ok
2005	My Sweetheart, My Darling	Jo Ok-jin
2005	Becoming a Popular Song	Park Jin-young
2006	Love Can't Wait	Kang Yeon-sook
2006	Hyena	
2006	Miracle	Lee Mi-so
2007	The Person I Love	
2007	Coffee Prince	Go Eun-chan's mother
2007	How to Meet a Perfect Neighbor	Sun-woo
2007	Winter Bird	Mrs. Kang
2008	Lawyers of the Great Republic of Korea	Go Kyung-hee
2008	Glass Castle	Yoon In-kyung
2009	Father's House	Soon-ae
2010	Three Sisters	Jang Soon-ae
2010	Smile, Mom	Park Soon-ja
2011	The Greatest Love	Yoon Pil-joo's mother
2011	Poseidon	Uhm Hee-sook
2011	Can't Lose	Yoo Jung-nan
2011	Lights and Shadows	Park Kyung-ja
2011	Bachelor's Vegetable Store	Hwang Soo-ja
2013	A Hundred Year Legacy	Bang Young-ja
2013	Golden Rainbow	Kang Jung-shim
2014	Triangle	Heo Choon-hee
2014	You Are My Destiny	Chairwoman Wang
2015	The Family is Coming	Jung Kkeut-soon/ Audrey Jung
2015	My Daughter, Geum Sa-wol	So Gook-ja
2016	Dear My Friends	Lee Young-won
2018	The Last Empress	Grand Empress Dowager Jo
2021	Mine	Yang Soon-hye, mother-in-law
2022	There is No Goo Pil Soo	Mrs.Geum

=== Film ===
Year	Title	Role
1975	Visitor in Dawn	
1975	Anna's Will	
1975	Graduating School Girls	
1975	Story of the Youth	
1976	Great Fighter	
1976	Miss Yeom's Pure Heart Days	
1976	Yes, Goodbye for Today	
1976	Rocking Horse and a Girl	
1976	Cold Hearted Rent	
1976	Why Do You Ask My Past?	
1977	Mother	
1977	Goodbye, Sir!	
1977	Winter Woman	
1977	The Three Close Stars	
1977	Hedgehog of the Third Quay	
1978	Butterfly Maiden	
1978	Evergreen	
1978	Fire	
1978	Lee Mu-gi of Oryuk Island	
1978	The Swamp of Exile	
1979	Traveller's Sadness	
1979	The Twelve Boarders	
1979	Miss Oh's Apartment Part 2	
1979	Do You Know Kotsuni?	
1979	The Camellia Man	
1980	One Night at a Strange Place	
1980	Spring Rain in Winter	
1980	The Man to be Forgotten	
1980	Hitman Sirasoni	
1980	Helpless Chun-ja	
1980	Lonely Star of Osaka	
1980	Come and See Me	
1980	Mrs. Speculator	
1980	Dull Servant Pal Bul-chul	
1980	Outsiders	
1980	A Fine, Windy Day	
1980	The Girl and the Minstrels	
1981	The Man Who Dies Everyday	
1981	Subzero Point '81	
1981	Yeo-ho God	
1981	Colorful Woman	
1981	Children of Darkness Part 1, Young-ae the Songstress	
1981	Last Stop	
1981	An Embrace in the Dark Night	
1982	Leave the Vengeance to Me	
1982	The Swamp of Desire	
1982	Sweet as Honey	
1983	Theater of Life	
1983	Three Days and Three Nights	
1983	Not Looks But the Heart	Song Ok-kyeong
1984	Widow Dance	
1984	Woman Who Grabbed the Rod	
1984	I Like It Just the Way It Is Now	
1985	The City in Amour	
1985	Heaven Night After Night	
1985	Deer Hunting	
1985	Eoudong	Hyang-ji
1985	Madame Aema 3	
1986	Those With Wings	
1986	Susana's Experience	
1986	My Daughter Saved from Den of Evil 2	
1986	The Wandering Stars	
1987	Moonlight Hunter	
1987	Y's Experience	
1987	The Trap	
1997	Change	Dae-ho's mother
2006	Oh! My God	Jung-hwan's mother

=== Variety show ===
Year	Title	Notes
1987–1991	Home Cooking	Host

=== Music video ===
Year	Song title	Artist
2010	"Love Is Better Than Money"	Tae Jin-ah

== Theater ==
Year	Title	Role
1974	Luv	
	Soyang River	
	여자가 머무르는 곳에	

== Bibliography ==
Year	Title	Publisher
1998	열흘 운 년이 보름은 못 울어?	Joongang M&B
1999	맘좋은 년은 시애비가 열둘?	Joongang M&B
2006	Medical Fitness with Park Won-sook	BM Korea
2006	The Last Diet of My Life - Bravo My Body!	Random House Korea

== Awards ==
Year	Award	Category	Nominated work
1974	MBC Drama Awards	Excellence Award, Actress	Narcissus
1974	Korean Theater, Film and TV Arts Awards	Best New Actress	Narcissus
1988	KBS Drama Awards	Top Excellence Award, Actress	Eldest Sister-in-law
1989	25th Baeksang Arts Awards	Best Actress (TV)	The Land
1998	MBC Drama Awards	Excellence Award, Actress	See and See Again
2003	SBS Drama Awards	Achievement Award	Miss Kim's Million Dollar Quest, My 19 Year Old Sister-in-Law
2005	12th Korea Entertainment Arts Awards	Minister of Culture and Tourism's Commendation	—N/a
2007	MBC Drama Awards	Golden Acting Award, Veteran Actress	Winter Bird
2013	MBC Drama Awards	Achievement Award	A Hundred Year Legacy
