= Im Chae-moo =

South Korean actor

- Born: September 2, 1949 (age 77); South Korea
- Occupation: Actor

Korean name
- Hangul: 임채무
- Hanja: 林采茂
- RR: Im Chaemu
- MR: Im Ch'aemu

Im Chae-moo (born September 2, 1949) is a South Korean actor. He opened an amusement park called Doori Land in 1990, which is still open as of 2024 but has financially struggled in recent years and left him in debt. Im has been married twice and has two children.

== Filmography ==
=== Television series ===
Year	Title	Role
1984	500 Years of Joseon: The Ume Tree in the Midst of the Snow	Sung Sam-moon
1985	500 Years of Joseon: The Imjin War	
1993	Marriage	Yong Shik
2000	Roll of Thunder	
2000	Bad Friends	
2001	Orient Theatre	Lee Kyung-hwan
2001	Life is Beautiful	Sang Man's father
2002	Who's My Love	Kim Duk-jin
2003	Near to You	
2003	Thousand Years of Love	Doctor Uhm
2003	Bodyguard	
2004	Little Women	Dae Mook
2004	The Age of Heroes	Kuk Chul-kyu
2005	KBS TV Novel: Wind Flower	Shin Dae-chool
2005	Dear Heaven	Lee Hong-pa
2006	Smile Again	Oh Joong-man
2007	The Person I Love	Park Kang-bae
2007	By My Side	Moon Yong-gi
2007	Golden Bride	Kim Sang-il / Richard Kim
2007	Unstoppable Marriage	Goo Gook
2008	Mom's Dead Upset	Choi Eun-sil's father
2008	Don't Be Swayed	Lee Yong-dae
2008	My Life's Golden Age	Yoo In-sik
2008	Temptation of Wife	
2009	Heading to the Ground	Kang Sung-il
2009	Enjoy Life	Jang In-shik
2010	Smile Again	Lee Kang-jae
2011	Dangerous Woman	Kang Joo-huk
2011	A Thousand Days' Promise	Park Chang-joo
2012	Tasty Life	Jang Shin-jo
2012	The Birth of a Family	Ma Jin-chul
2014	Two Mothers	Baek Chul
2014	Apgujeong Midnight Sun	Jang Choo-jang
2016	You Are a Gift	Ma Dong-sik
2017	Happy Sisters	Lee Sung-pil
2018	Gangnam Scandal	Choi Jin-bok
2024	Dog Knows Everything	Lim Chae-mu

=== Film ===
Year	Title	Role
2006	Shark Bait	(voice)
2007	Highway Star	Jang Joon
2007	Unstoppable Marriage	Park Ji-man
2010	Republic of Korea 1%	Commander (cameo)

=== Variety show ===
Year	Title	Notes/Ref.
2006	Golden Fishery	Main panel member, Segment: True Story Theatre
2022	Romantic Doctor Im Chae-moo	Host

== Awards and nominations ==
Year	Award	Category	Nominated work	Result
2007	SBS Drama Awards	Excellence Award, Actor in a Serial Drama	Golden Bride	Won
2010	MBC Drama Awards	Golden Acting Award, Veteran Actor	Enjoy Life	Won
