= A Hundred Year Legacy =

2013 South Korean television series

- Promotional poster
- Also known as: A 100-Year Legacy; A Hundred Years' Inheritance; A Century of Tradition
- Hangul: 백년의 유산
- Hanja: 百年의 遺産
- RR: Baengnyeonui yusan
- MR: Paengnyŏnŭi yusan
- Genre: Romance
- Written by: Gu Hyun-sook
- Directed by: Joo Sung-woo
- Starring: Eugene; Lee Jung-jin
- Composer: Choi In-hee
- Country of origin: South Korea
- Original language: Korean
- No. of episodes: 50

Production
- Executive producer: Lee Chang-seop
- Cinematography: Maeng Gi-ho
- Editor: Kang Ja-joong
- Production company: Pan Entertainment

Original release
- Network: MBC TV
- Release: January 5 – June 23, 2013

A Hundred Year Legacy (Korean: 백년의 유산; RR: Baengnyeonui yusan) is a 2013 South Korean television series starring Eugene and Lee Jung-jin. Revolving around themes of food, love and family, the warm human drama is about a modest Seoul noodle house that's been operated by the same family for three generations. It aired on MBC from January 5 to June 23, 2013, on Saturdays and Sundays at 21:50 for 50 episodes.

The early working title was Third Generation Noodle House (Korean: 삼대째 국수집; RR: Samdaejjae guksujip).

It won Drama of the Year at the 2013 MBC Drama Awards.

== Plot ==
Min Chae-won is the eldest granddaughter of a family living in an outskirts of Seoul who have been running a noodle factory for three generations. Married for three years to Chul-gyu, whose rich family owns the major corporation Golden Dragon Food, Chae-won has had a difficult life because her mother-in-law fiercely opposed the match and would not accept her.

When her husband cheats on her, she detaches herself from her in-laws and decides to divorce him. Her mother-in-law has her falsely committed to a mental institution as revenge for the divorce. She returns to the noodle factory and struggles to modernize and expand it. Chae-won later meets Lee Se-yoon, the son of a wealthy household, who is infamous for his disparaging treatment of all those around him. They both nurse wounds from their past romantic relationships.

== Cast ==
- Eugene as Min Chae-won
- Lee Jung-jin as Lee Se-yoon
- Choi Won-young as Kim Chul-gyu
- Yoon A-jung as Kim Joo-ri
- Shin Goo as Uhm Pyung-dal
- Jung Hye-sun as Kim Kkeut-soon
- Jung Bo-seok as Min Hyo-dong
- Jeon In-hwa as Yang Choon-hee
- Kim Myung-soo as Uhm Ki-moon
- Park Joon-geum as Do Do-hee
- Seo Young-hoon as Uhm Seul-hong
- Kwon Oh-joong as Uhm Ki-choon
- Kim Hee-jung as Gong Kang-sook
- Lee Tae-woo as Uhm Bo-reum
- Sunwoo Sun as Uhm Ki-ok
- Park Yeong-gyu as Kang Jin
- Cha Hwa-yeon as Baek Seol-joo
- Nam Myung-ryul as Lee Dong-kyu
- Park Won-sook as Bang Young-ja
- Gong Jung-hwan as Se-yoon's seonbae
- Hwang Sun-hee as Eun-seol
- Shim Yi-young as Ma Hong-joo
- Oh Ha-nee as Ha-nee
- Seo Kwon-soon as Hong-joo's mother
- Jeon Sung-ae as Mrs. Park
- Baek Bo-ram as shaman ("mudang")
- Min Joon-hyun as Chairman Bang's reporter
- Lee Hyun-woo

== Awards and nominations ==
Year	Award	Category	Recipient	Result
2013	Korea Drama Awards	Top Excellence Award, Actor	Lee Jung-jin	Won
2013	Korea Drama Awards	Excellence Award, Actress	Eugene	Nominated
2013	Korea Drama Awards	Best Production Director	Joo Sung-woo	Nominated
2013	APAN Star Awards	Excellence Award, Actress	Eugene	Nominated
2013	MBC Drama Awards	Drama of the Year	A Hundred Year Legacy	Won
2013	MBC Drama Awards	Top Excellence Award, Actor in a Drama Serial	Lee Jung-jin	Won
2013	MBC Drama Awards	Top Excellence Award, Actress in a Drama Serial	Eugene	Nominated
2013	MBC Drama Awards	Top Excellence Award, Actress in a Drama Serial	Park Won-sook	Nominated
2013	MBC Drama Awards	Golden Acting Award, Actor	Jung Bo-seok	Won
2013	MBC Drama Awards	Writer of the Year	Gu Hyun-sook	Won
2013	MBC Drama Awards	Lifetime Achievement Award	Park Won-sook	Won
2014	WorldFest-Houston International Film Festival	Bronze Remi Award for Dramatic TV Series	A Hundred Year Legacy	Won
