= Sertv =

SERTV
Panama City; Panama
- Channels: Analog: 11 VHF; Digital: 41 DVB-T
- Branding: Sertv

Ownership
- Owner: Sistema Estatal de Radio y Televisión
- Sister stations: Nacional FM; Crisol FM

History
- First air date: December 31, 1980
- Former names: RTVE, Canal 11

Technical information
- Translator(s): (Ch.23) Chiriqui, Bocas (Ch.26) Azuero, Cocle (Ch.10) Colon, Darien (Ch.22) Veraguas

Links
- Website: www.sertv.gob.pa

The Sistema Estatal de Radio y Televisión (SERTV, "State Radio and Television System"), is the public broadcaster of Panama. It operates two radio networks and the Sertv national television network, broadcast on channel 11 in Panama City.

== History ==
In 1967, the Universidad de Panamá began operation of a closed circuit television station on the university campus. In 1971, the station began to take programming from the new Radio y Televisión Educativa, and the operation moved to new facilities in 1975.

In 1977, work began to bring the station to broadcast television, as "Canal Once Telexperimental". The first channel 11 signal went to air on January 22, 1978, and the station received final approval to operate channel 11 in 1980. The name of "Canal 11" was replaced with "RTE" (not to be confused with the Irish broadcaster) after the end of military governance, and later "RTVE". During this time period it added transmitters in other areas of the country and expanded its radio operations.

In 2004, RTVE was restructured as the Sistema Estatal de Radio y Televisión, with improved studios and programming.

In 2010, SERTV became the first station to broadcast in the DVB-T format in Panama.

== Programming ==
Current programming is totally different as used to be in the 80s, with new studios; news, interviews and TV shows are produced locally. These shows are called "Non Toxic Programming" (Produccion No Toxica) and the most important are:

- Recordar es Vivir (old music video clip show)
- El Poder de la Timba (local musicians show)
- Sala 11 (movies review show)
- Sertv Noticias (local news)

Special Programs

- Mi Cancion
- Sabores de Mi Barrio

== Radio Stations ==
Sertv also operates two radio stations:

- Nacional FM
- Crisol FM
