= Hold My Hand (TV series) =

2013–2014 South Korean TV series

- Promotional poster
- Also known as: Take My Hand
- Genre: Melodrama; Romance; Revenge
- Written by: Hong Seung-hee
- Directed by: Choi Eun-kyung; Lee Gye-joon
- Starring: Park Si-eun; Bae Geu-rin; Lee Jae-hwang; Jin Tae-hyun
- Music by: Nam Hye-seung
- Country of origin: South Korea
- Original language: Korean
- No. of episodes: 130

Production
- Executive producer: Lee Jae-dong
- Running time: 40 minutes
- Production company: MBC C&I

Original release
- Network: MBC TV
- Release: October 7, 2013 – April 4, 2014

Hold My Hand (Korean: 내 손을 잡아; RR: Nae soneul jaba) is a 2013 South Korean morning soap opera starring Park Si-eun, Bae Geu-rin, Lee Jae-hwang, and Jin Tae-hyun. It premiered on October 7, 2013 on MBC TV, airing every Monday to Friday at 7:50 a.m. for 130 episodes.

== Synopsis ==
Yeon-soo has a bright and positive personality. Since her father died, she lives with her mother and younger brother. Despite their financially difficult situation, Yeon-soo lives happily with her family and her boyfriend Jung-hyun.

But then Yeon-soo's life changes drastically. Her mother is killed and Yeon-soo is accused of murdering her. Every piece of evidence points to her as her mother's killer.

== Cast ==
- Park Si-eun as Han Yeon-soo
- Bae Geu-rin as Oh Shin-hee
- Lee Jae-hwang as Min Joo-won
- Jin Tae-hyun as Min Jung-hyun
- Ahn Mi-na as Park Mi-jin
- Geum Bo-ra as Kang Yang-soon
- Kim Young-ran as Kang Ae-soon
- Park Jung-soo as Na Geum-ja
- Choi Sang-hoon as Min Dong-hoon
- Ahn Suk-hwan as Oh Jin-tae
- Lee Chang-wook as Jung Hyun-soo
- Kim Dong-gyun as Kim Chul-jin

== International broadcast ==
- It aired in Vietnam from May 26, 2015 on VTV3.

== See also ==
- List of South Korean dramas
