= Feast of the Gods (TV series) =

2012 South Korean television series

- Promotional poster for Feast of the Gods
- Also known as: Banquet of the Gods; Supper of the Gods
- Hangul: 신들의 만찬
- Hanja: 神들의 晚餐
- RR: Sindeurui manchan
- MR: Sindŭrŭi manch'an
- Genre: Melodrama; Romance; Comedy; Food
- Written by: Jo Eun-jung
- Directed by: Lee Dong-yoon
- Starring: Sung Yu-ri; Seo Hyun-jin; Joo Sang-wook; Lee Sang-woo
- Country of origin: South Korea
- Original language: Korean
- No. of episodes: 32

Original release
- Network: Munhwa Broadcasting Corporation
- Release: February 4 – May 20, 2012

Feast of the Gods (Korean: 신들의 만찬; RR: Sindeurui manchan) is a 2012 South Korean television series, starring Sung Yu-ri, Seo Hyun-jin, Joo Sang-wook and Lee Sang-woo. The series follows the fate of two girls whose identities were switched and later become rival chefs of traditional royal cuisine. It aired on MBC from February 4 to May 20, 2012, on Saturdays and Sundays at 21:50 for 32 episodes.

== Plot ==
At the center of the drama is Arirang, a renowned restaurant that specializes in royal Korean cuisine. For generations, Arirang has chosen only the most expert and gifted chefs to continue its heritage of making traditional Korean food. When Sung Do-hee (Jeon In-hwa) is appointed the next successor, rival Baek Seol-hee (Kim Bo-yeon) will stop at nothing to claim her stake on the restaurant. The forces of greed and jealousy drive both women to risk family and happiness until unimaginable tragedy and loss strike both of their lives.

Several years later, Arirang seeks a successor to lead the institution. Go Joon-young (Sung Yu-ri), a hardworking woman from a rural background, emerges as a candidate for the position. However, Ha In-joo (Seo Hyun-jin), the daughter of Sung Do-hee, also seeks to succeed her mother. As Joon-young and In-joo pursue their ambitions to master Korean cuisine, their personal histories, romantic relationships, and identities become interconnected, leading to conflicts involving truth, integrity, deception, and corruption.

== Cast ==
- Sung Yu-ri as Go Joon-young
  - Jung Min-ah as young Joon-young
- Seo Hyun-jin as Ha In-joo / Song Yeon-woo
  - Joo Da-young as young In-joo
- Joo Sang-wook as Choi Jae-ha
- Lee Sang-woo as Kim Do-yoon
- Jeon In-hwa as Sung Do-hee
- Kim Bo-yeon as Baek Seol-hee
- Jung Hye-sun as Sun Noh-in
- Jung Dong-hwan as Ha Young-bum
- Jin Tae-hyun as Ha In-woo
- Park Sang-myun as Im Do-shik
- Seo Yi-sook as No Young-sim
- Sean Richard Dulake as Daniel
- Son Hwa-ryung as Kim Shin-young
- Yeon Min-ji as Jane
- Park Jeong-min as Jang Mi-so

== Ratings ==
Episode #	Original broadcast date	Average audience share			
Episode #	Original broadcast date	TNmS Ratings		AGB Nielsen	
Episode #	Original broadcast date	Nationwide	Seoul National Capital Area	Nationwide	Seoul National Capital Area
1	February 2, 2012	12.9%	15.3%	14.8%	16.4%
2	February 5, 2012	12.3%	15.0%	12.3%	13.5%
3	February 11, 2012	13.3%	16.5%	13.1%	14.5%
4	February 12, 2012	13.1%	16.6%	12.2%	13.2%
5	February 18, 2012	14.8%	17.4%	14.5%	16.1%
6	February 19, 2012	13.3%	16.5%	12.9%	14.5%
7	February 25, 2012	15.1%	17.7%	14.4%	16.6%
8	February 26, 2012	14.3%	16.4%	14.0%	16.2%
9	March 3, 2012	13.9%	16.8%	15.4%	17.6%
10	March 4, 2012	12.8%	14.8%	13.3%	14.3%
11	March 10, 2012	15.5%	18.5%	15.0%	17.1%
12	March 11, 2012	14.4%	16.8%	14.2%	15.3%
13	March 17, 2012	16.9%	19.8%	16.7%	18.1%
14	March 18, 2012	14.5%	18.5%	16.3%	18.2%
15	March 24, 2012	17.4%	21.2%	17.2%	18.7%
16	March 25, 2012	15.0%	18.9%	16.4%	17.9%
17	March 31, 2012	14.0%	17.1%	15.5%	16.2%
18	April 1, 2012	13.5%	15.4%	15.7%	17.6%
19	April 7, 2012	15.2%	19.1%	15.3%	17.1%
20	April 8, 2012	15.4%	19.0%	16.9%	19.1%
21	April 14, 2012	17.3%	20.2%	16.4%	18.0%
22	April 15, 2012	15.8%	19.1%	17.0%	19.1%
23	April 21, 2012	16.0%	18.8%	17.3%	19.1%
24	April 22, 2012	17.3%	20.1%	17.2%	19.4%
25	April 28, 2012	17.0%	20.1%	18.2%	19.8%
26	April 29, 2012	15.6%	18.3%	17.8%	20.1%
27	May 5, 2012	16.7%	20.7%	19.2%	21.4%
28	May 6, 2012	17.4%	20.4%	19.1%	20.8%
29	May 12, 2012	17.2%	20.8%	19.0%	21.3%
30	May 13, 2012	17.9%	21.8%	20.4%	22.8%
31	May 19, 2012	17.8%	20.4%	18.1%	19.8%
32	May 20, 2012	18.3%	21.9%	19.5%	21.7%
Average		15.4%	18.4%	16.1%	17.9%

== Awards and nominations ==
Year	Award	Category	Recipient	Result
2012	1st K-Drama Star Awards	Excellence Award, Actor	Joo Sang-wook	Nominated
2012	MBC Drama Awards	Grand Prize (Daesang)	Sung Yu-ri	Nominated
2012	MBC Drama Awards	Top Excellence Award, Actor in a Special Project Drama	Joo Sang-wook	Nominated
2012	MBC Drama Awards	Top Excellence Award, Actress in a Special Project Drama	Sung Yu-ri	Won
2012	MBC Drama Awards	Excellence Award, Actor in a Special Project Drama	Lee Sang-woo	Won
2012	MBC Drama Awards	Excellence Award, Actress in a Special Project Drama	Kim Bo-yeon	Nominated
2012	MBC Drama Awards	Excellence Award, Actress in a Drama Serial	Seo Hyun-jin	Won
2012	MBC Drama Awards	Golden Acting Award, Actress	Jeon In-hwa	Won

== International broadcast ==
- At the 18th Shanghai Television Festival in June 2012, the broadcast rights of the show were sold to Thailand.
