= Wonderful Life (2005 TV series) =

- Genre: Romance; Comedy; Drama; Family
- Written by: Jin Soo-wan
- Directed by: Lee Chang-han; Jo Soo-won
- Starring: Kim Jaewon; Eugene; Lee Ji-hoon; Han Eun-jung; Jung Da-bin
- Composer: Choi Wan-hee
- Country of origin: South Korea
- Original language: Korean
- No. of episodes: 16

Production
- Executive producer: Shin Ho-gyun
- Production locations: South Korea; Singapore
- Running time: 60 minutes
- Production company: JS Pictures

Original release
- Network: Munhwa Broadcasting Corporation
- Release: March 7 – April 26, 2005

Wonderful Life (Korean: 원더풀 라이프) is a 2005 South Korean television series starring Kim Jaewon, Eugene, Lee Ji-hoon, Han Eun-jung and Jung Da-bin. It aired on MBC from March 7 to April 26, 2005 on Mondays and Tuesdays at 21:55, for 16 episodes.

== Synopsis ==
Han Seung-wan (Kim Jaewon) travels to Singapore to visit his first love, Lee Chae-young (Han Eun-jung). At the airport, he bumps into a young woman named Jung Se-jin (Eugene), and they accidentally swap passports. While Se-jin is on her way to the address listed on Seung-wan's passport, she meets Min Do-hyun (Lee Ji-hoon), who kindly gives her a piggyback ride. When Seung-wan and Se-jin finally meet at Chae-young's apartment, Seung-wan agrees to give back Se-jin's passport on the condition that she help him track down his missing girlfriend. To Seung-wan's shock, they discover that Chae-young is in a relationship with Do-hyun, whom she'd met in Australia. Heartbroken, Seung-wan goes drinking with Se-jin and turns to her for comfort, and they end up having a one-night stand in a hotel in Sentosa.

The morning after, Se-jin tells Seung-wan that she'd been a virgin and that he should "take responsibility" for their sexual encounter. The immature Seung-wan leaves her, and returns home earlier than scheduled. Back in Korea, his father kicks him out of the house for spending too much money on liquor, and he contacts Se-jin again. She agrees to help him earn money to pay back his father, but soon realizes that her increased appetite and vomiting of late are symptoms of pregnancy. She buys a pregnancy test while in disguise, and runs into Do-hyun again. After confirming that she's pregnant, Se-jin tells Seung-wan that she's leaving Korea and study abroad in Australia.

A year later, Se-jin's older sister crashes Seung-wan's father's birthday party, carrying his daughter, Shin-bi (Jung Da-bin). Their parents force Seung-wan and Se-jin to get married for the baby's sake, but the two draw up a list of rules that they must abide by, including the freedom to pursue their own careers and individual love lives, as well as a possible divorce in five years' time. Unprepared for the twin responsibilities of a quickie marriage and young parenthood which were thrust upon them, the two bicker and gradually figure things out. Seung-wan takes a job in his father's construction business to support the family, but is forced to leave for mandatory military service shortly after.

Upon his return, the reunited Seung-wan and Se-jin face new challenges. While the former juggles chores due to his continuing studies to become a pilot, the latter struggles to find employment in a job market that discriminates against her for being a mother. Chae-young gets her an interview at the Kidsbear company where she works, though her assistance hides jealous intentions; aware of Do-hyun's feelings for Se-jin, Chae-young plots to regain her former boyfriend Seung-wan by breaking up the family. Se-jin gets hired by Kidsbear, but she and her husband continue to deal with relationship problems brought on by Chae-young's interference.

But when Shin-bi is diagnosed with leukemia and Seung-wan and Se-jin desperately search for a viable bone marrow donor, they realize how much they love each other and the family they've created.

== Cast ==
- Kim Jaewon as Han Seung-wan
- Eugene as Jung Se-jin
- Lee Ji-hoon as Min Do-hyun
- Han Eun-jung as Lee Chae-young
- Jung Da-bin as Han Shin-bi
- Joo Hyun as Han Bum-soo, Seung-wan's father
- Sunwoo Yong-nyeo as Yoon Tae-hee, Seung-wan's mother
- Kim Hye-ok as Pyo Jae-kyung, Se-jin's mother
- Choi Joon-yong as Han Seung-pil, Seung-wan's older brother
- Yoon Hyun-sook as Baek Hyun-joo, Seung-pil's wife
- Kim Hyo-jin as Jung Il-jin, Se-jin's older sister
- Kim Seung-min as So Chang-myung, Seung-wan and Do-hyun's classmate at the flight academy
- Lee Hye-sook as Do-hyun's stepmother
- Kim Hee-jung as Hyung-wook's mother

== Ratings ==
In the table below, the blue numbers represent the lowest ratings and the red numbers represent the highest ratings.

Episode #	Original broadcast date	AGB Nielsen
Episode #	Original broadcast date	Nationwide
1	2005-03-07	13.7 (7th)
2	2005-03-08	11.6 (12th)
3	2005-03-14	12.4 (9th)
4	2005-03-15	13.5 (8th)
5	2005-03-21	12.8 (8th)
6	2005-03-22	14.0 (8th)
7	2005-03-28	11.4 (13th)
8	2005-03-29	11.3 (11th)
9	2005-04-04	12.3 (10th)
10	2005-04-05	13.0 (10th)
11	2005-04-11	11.0 (13th)
12	2005-04-12	10.3 (16th)
13	2005-04-18	11.4 (13th)
14	2005-04-19	11.5 (12th)
15	2005-04-25	9.6 (16th)
16	2005-04-26	10.3 (14th)
Average		11.9%
