= Lee Hye-sook =

South Korean actress (born 1962)

- Born: September 4, 1962 (age 64); Seoul, South Korea
- Education: Hanyang University - Theater and Film
- Occupation: Actress
- Years active: 1979–present
- Spouse: Han Gi-eun (m. 1992)
- Children: 1

Korean name
- Hangul: 이혜숙
- Hanja: 李惠淑
- RR: I Hyesuk
- MR: I Hyesuk

Lee Hye-sook (Korean: 이혜숙; born September 4, 1962) is a South Korean actress. She began acting in 1979, and has remained active in Korean cinema and television since. Lee is best known for the 1991 film Silver Stallion, in which she portrayed a young widow who was raped by an American soldier from a nearby base, then afterwards shunned by her village and driven to poverty and prostitution.

== Filmography ==
=== Film ===
Year	Title	Role
1980	White Smile	
1980	Winter Love	
1981	Subzero Point '81	Young-ok
1981	Youth Is Passion	
1984	The Forgotten Season	
1984	Holy Mission	Lady Jung
1984	Close Call with Death	Julie
1985	The Stranger	
1986	Mulberry	
1986	Tae (The Placenta)	Gwi-deok
1986	Jung-gwang's Nonsense	
1986	Days of Seduction	
1987	Sorrow	Lee Mi-sook
1991	Portrait of the Days of Youth	Lee Jeong-nim
1991	Camels Don't Cry Alone	
1991	Silver Stallion	Eon-rae
1992	Kim's War	후사꼬
1998	Bye June	Nurse 1
2001	Wanee & Junah	Wa-ni's mother
2008	Open City	Song Ae-soon (cameo)
2009	Take Off	Bob's birth mother

=== Television series ===
Year	Title	Role	Network
1979	Chief Inspector		MBC
1979	Class 3		MBC
1980	Anguk-dong Miss	Crown Prince's Consort	MBC
1981	New Lady	Daughter-in-law (wife of the youngest son)	MBC
1981	Women's History: "Jang Hui-bin"	Queen Inhyeon	MBC
1981	Women's History: "Eunjangdo (Silver Knife)"		MBC
1983	Gosanja Kim Jeong-ho		MBC
1983	500 Years of Joseon: "The King of Chudong Palace"		MBC
1984	Governor-General of Joseon	Ye Wanyong's adoptive daughter	MBC
1984	Spray	Yoon-hee	MBC
1984	Bestseller Theater: "Beep Beep Club"		MBC
1985	500 Years of Joseon: "The Imjin War"	Yodo-dono	MBC
1986	Winter Flower	Han Mi-kyung	MBC
1987	Tomorrow and Tomorrow	Mi-yeon	MBC
1988	Three Women	Jang Se-hee	MBC
1988	Famine in the City	Ji Soo-hee	MBC
1988	New York Love Story	Jang Mi-hee	Fuji TV
1989	Senoya	Kang Shin-ae	KBS1
1989	Flowering Nest		KBS2
1990	Mong-sil's Older Sister	Buk Cheon-deok, Mong-sil's stepmother	MBC
1991	Near the Valley	Han Min-hwa	KBS2
1991	Hyung (My Older Brother)		KBS2
1991	Kim's War	Choi Moon-hee/Husako	Fuji TV
1994	Wind Blowing in the Window	Won-hee	KBS2
1995	Good Men, Good Women	Choi Yoon-kyung	KBS2
1996	When a Woman Loves	Jung-in	KBS2
1996	Deokhye	Princess Deokhye	MBC
1996	Shooting		KBS2
1996	Gan-yi-yeok	Choi Yeon-woo	MBC
1987	Happy Morning		KBS2
1998	Hong Gil-dong	Choon-seom	SBS
1998	Hug	Jung-ae	SBS
1999	School 1	Math teacher Yoon Yoo-ran	KBS2
1999	School 2	Math teacher Yoon Yoo-ran	KBS2
1999	Beautiful Choice	Go Yoon-jung	MBC
2000	She's the One	Hong Chun-hee	KBS2
2000	School 3	Math teacher Yoon Yoo-ran	KBS2
2000	Virtue	Kim Soon-young	SBS
2000	SWAT Police	Yoo Kang-joo's mother	SBS
2001	Ladies of the Palace	Yun Won-hyung's wife	SBS
2001	Delicious Proposal	Kwon Mi-sook	MBC
2001	KBS TV Novel: "Stepmother"	Lee Hae-shim	KBS1
2001	Dancing Great Seoul Line		Fuji TV
2002	Successful Story of a Bright Girl	Moon Jung-im	SBS
2002	Ruler of Your Own World	Kang In-ok	MBC
2003	Hello! Balbari	Min-ji's mother	KBS2
2003	Country Princess	Yoon Ji-sook	MBC
2003	Merry Go Round	Sung Eun-kyo's mother	MBC
2003	Moon on Cheomseongdae	Sun-young	KBS2
2003	One Million Roses	Kim Soon-young	KBS1
2003	The King's Woman	Lady Kim, In-bin	SBS
2003	Breathless	Oh Hyun-mi	MBC
2004	April Kiss	Oh Shin-ja	KBS2
2004	The Age of Heroes	Chun Tae-hee	MBC
2004	My 19 Year Old Sister-in-Law	Song Kyung-hwa	SBS
2004	Hyung (My Older Brother)	Kim Min-hee	KBS2
2004	New York Love Story 2	Miheui Koike	Fuji TV
2005	Encounter	Yoon-ok	MBC
2005	Wonderful Life	Min Do-hyun's stepmother	MBC
2005	5th Republic	Jang Young-ja	MBC
2005	Loveholic	Im Young-ae	KBS2
2005	A Farewell to Sorrow	Kang Hye-sun	KBS2
2005	KBS TV Novel: "Sonaki (Rain Shower)"		KBS2
2006	Mr. Goodbye	Mi-hee	KBS2
2006	Hearts of Nineteen	Choi Hye-sook	KBS1
2006	Special Crime Investigation: "Murder in the Blue House"	First Lady Lee Jin-ah	KBS2
2007	Heaven & Earth	Jin-sook	KBS1
2007	Landscape in My Heart	Jang Mo-ran	KBS1
2007	Merry Mary	Oh Sung-ja	MBC
2007	Ground Zero	Park Sung-hee	MBC
2008	Woman of Matchless Beauty, Park Jung-geum	Sa Soon-ja	MBC
2008	Why Did You Come to Our House?	Kim Mi-soon	SBS
2008	You Are My Destiny	Hong Yeon-shil	KBS1
2008	Glass Castle	Han Yang-sook	SBS
2009	What's for Dinner?	Yoon Mi-hee	MBC
2009	Partner	Jung Hye-sook (guest, episodes 3–7)	KBS2
2009	Don't Hesitate	Lee Jung-soo	SBS
2009	Hero	Joo Myung-hee	MBC
2010	Definitely Neighbors	Han Soo-hee	SBS
2010	Pure Pumpkin Flower	Pil-soon	SBS
2011	Dream High	Song Nam-boon	KBS2
2011	My Bittersweet Life	Geum Hwa-yeon	KBS1
2011	My Love By My Side	Sun-ah (cameo)	SBS
2011	If Tomorrow Comes	Kim Bo-bae	SBS
2012	Fashion King	Yoon Hyang-sook	SBS
2012	The Moon and Stars for You	Oh Young-sun	KBS1
2013	My Lover, Madame Butterfly	Sylvia Choi	SBS
2013	Pots of Gold	Jang Deok-hee	MBC
2013	One Well-Raised Daughter	Im Chung-ran	SBS
2015	House of Bluebird	Jung Soo-kyung	KBS2
2015	The Return of Hwang Geum-bok	Cha Mi-yeon	SBS
2016	Beautiful Gong Shim	Lawyer's wife	SBS
2018	My Only One	Hong-sil	KBS2
2022	Love (ft. Marriage and Divorce) 3	Kim Dong-mi	TV Chosun

=== Variety show ===
Year	Title	Network	Notes
1986	All Night Fuji	Fuji TV	Host
1987	JOCX-TV2 - Seoul Soul	Fuji TV	Host

== Awards and nominations ==
Year	Award	Category	Nominated work	Result
1982	18th Baeksang Arts Awards	Best New Actress (TV)	Women's History: Jang Hui-bin	Won
1982	MBC Drama Awards	Best New Actress	Women's History: Jang Hui-bin	Won
1990	26th Baeksang Arts Awards	Most Popular Actress (TV)	Flowering Nest	Won
1991	15th Montréal World Film Festival	Best Actress	Silver Stallion	Won
1991	27th Baeksang Arts Awards	Best Actress	Silver Stallion	Won
1991	29th Grand Bell Awards	Best Actress	Silver Stallion	Nominated
1991	12th Blue Dragon Film Awards	Best Actress	Silver Stallion	Nominated
1991	12th Blue Dragon Film Awards	Popular Star Award	Silver Stallion	Won
1991	11th Korean Association of Film Critics Awards	Best Actress	Silver Stallion	Won
1991	Presidential Commendation for Culture	Recipient	Silver Stallion	Won
1992	30th Grand Bell Awards	Best Actress	Kim's War	Nominated
1992	13th Blue Dragon Film Awards	Best Actress	Kim's War	Nominated
2002	KBS Drama Awards	Excellence Award, Actress	TV Novel: Stepmother	Won
2005	KBS Drama Awards	Excellence Award, Actress	A Farewell to Sorrow	Won
2008	KBS Drama Awards	Best Supporting Actress	You Are My Destiny	Nominated
2009	17th Chunsa Film Art Awards	Best Supporting Actress	Take Off	Won
2011	KBS Drama Awards	Excellence Award, Actress in a Daily Drama	My Bittersweet Life	Nominated
2013	MBC Drama Awards	Golden Acting Award, Actress	Pots of Gold	Won
