= 2011 SBS Drama Awards =

19th edition of award ceremony

- Date: December 31, 2011
- Site: SBS Open Hall, Deungchon-dong, Seoul
- Hosted by: Ji Sung; Choi Kang-hee

Television coverage
- Network: SBS

The 2011 SBS Drama Awards is a ceremony honoring the best performances in television on the SBS network for the year 2011. It was held at the SBS Open Hall in Deungchon-dong, Seoul on December 31st, 2011, and was hosted by actor Ji Sung and actress Choi Kang-hee.

== Nominations and winners ==
Complete list of nominees and winners:

(Winners denoted in bold)

Grand Prize (Daesang)	Achievement Award
**Han Suk-kyu** – **Deep Rooted Tree as King Sejong**	**Kim Young-ok** – **Protect the Boss**
Top Excellence Award, Actor in a Drama Special	Top Excellence Award, Actress in a Drama Special
**Ji Sung** – **Protect the Boss as Cha Ji-heon**; **Lee Min-ho** – **City Hunter as Lee Yoon-sung**; Han Suk-kyu – Deep Rooted Tree as King Sejong; Park Shin-yang – Sign as Yoon Ji-hoon	**Choi Kang-hee** – **Protect the Boss as Noh Eun-seol**; Kim Ah-joong – Sign as Go Da-kyung; Lee Yo-won – 49 Days as Song Yi-kyung; Uhm Ji-won – Sign as Jung Woo-jin
Top Excellence Award, Actor in a Special Planning Drama	Top Excellence Award, Actress in a Special Planning Drama
**Jang Hyuk** – **Midas as Kim Do-hyun**; **Kim Rae-won** – **A Thousand Days' Promise as Park Ji-hyung**; Choi Min-soo – Warrior Baek Dong-soo as Chun; Jung Woo-sung – Athena: Goddess of War as Lee Jung-woo	**Soo Ae** – **A Thousand Days' Promise as Lee Seo-yeon**; Kim Hee-ae – Midas as Yoo In-hye; Lee Ji-ah – Athena: Goddess of War as Han Jae-hui; Yoon Eun-hye – Lie to Me as Gong Ah-jung
Top Excellence Award, Actor in a Weekend/Daily Drama	Top Excellence Award, Actress in a Weekend/Daily Drama
**Lee Dong-wook** – **Scent of a Woman as Kang Ji-wook**; Oh Dae-gyu – War of the Roses as Park Dae-sung; Son Hyun-joo – Living in Style as Na Dae-ra	**Kim Sun-a** – **Scent of a Woman as Lee Yeon-jae**; Bae Jong-ok – Pure Pumpkin Flower as Joon-sun; Lee Hwi-hyang – My Love By My Side as Bae Jung-ja
Excellence Award, Actor in a Drama Special	Excellence Award, Actress in a Drama Special
**Jung Gyu-woon** – **Sign as Choi Yi-han**; Bae Soo-bin – 49 Days as Kang Min-ho; Jo Hyun-jae – 49 Days as Han Kang; Lee Joon-hyuk – City Hunter as Kim Young-joo	**Shin Se-kyung** – **Deep Rooted Tree as So-yi**; Nam Gyu-ri – 49 Days as Shin Ji-hyun; Park Min-young – City Hunter as Kim Na-na; Seo Ji-hye – 49 Days as Shin In-jung
Excellence Award, Actor in a Special Planning Drama	Excellence Award, Actress in a Special Planning Drama
**Jun Kwang-ryul** – **Warrior Baek Dong-soo as Kim Gwang-taek**; Cha Seung-won – Athena: Goddess of War as Son Hyeok; Kang Ji-hwan – Lie to Me as Hyun Ki-joon; Lee Sang-woo – A Thousand Days' Promise as Jang Jae-min	**Yoon So-yi** – **Warrior Baek Dong-soo as Hwang Jin-joo**; Jeong Yu-mi – A Thousand Days' Promise as Noh Hyang-gi; Lee Min-jung – Midas as Lee Jung-yeon; Soo Ae – Athena: Goddess of War as Yoon Hye-in
Excellence Award, Actor in a Weekend/Daily Drama	Excellence Award, Actress in a Weekend/Daily Drama
**Um Ki-joon** – **Scent of a Woman as Chae Eun-suk**; Kwon Oh-joong – Miss Ajumma as Go Kyung-se; Lee Chang-hoon – While You Were Sleeping as Chae Hyuk-jin; Lee Jae-yoon – My Love By My Side as Lee So-ryong	**Lee So-yeon** – **My Love By My Side as Do Mi-sol**; Lee Young-eun – While You Were Sleeping as Oh Shin-young; Oh Hyun-kyung – Miss Ajumma as Kang Geum-hwa; Oh Yoon-ah – While You Were Sleeping as Go Hyun-sung
Special Acting Award, Actor in a Drama Special	Special Acting Award, Actress in a Drama Special
**Park Yeong-gyu** – **Protect the Boss as Chairman Cha**; Cho Jin-woong – Deep Rooted Tree as Moo-hyul; Chun Ho-jin – City Hunter as Choi Eung-chan; Kim Sang-joong – City Hunter as Lee Jin-pyo	**Song Ok-sook** – **Deep Rooted Tree as Do Dam-daek**; Cha Hwa-yeon – Protect the Boss as Shin Sook-hee; Hwang Sun-hee – Sign as Kang Seo-yeon; Wang Ji-hye – Protect the Boss as Seo Na-yoon
Special Acting Award, Actor in a Special Planning Drama	Special Acting Award, Actress in a Special Planning Drama
**Yoon Je-moon** – **Midas as Yoo Sung-joon**; Lee Won-jong – Warrior Baek Dong-soo as Hong Dae-ju; Park Chul-min – Warrior Baek Dong-soo as In; Yoo Dong-geun – Athena: Goddess of War as Kwon Yong-gwan	**Lee Mi-sook** – **A Thousand Days' Promise as Oh Hyun-ah**; Hong Soo-hyun – Lie to Me as Yoo So-ran; Kim Hae-sook – A Thousand Days' Promise as Kang Soo-jung; Yoon Ji-min – Warrior Baek Dong-soo as Ji
Special Acting Award, Actor in a Weekend/Daily Drama	Special Acting Award, Actress in a Weekend/Daily Drama
**Jin Tae-hyun** – **Pure Pumpkin Flower as Yoo Min-soo**; Han Jin-hee – New Tales of Gisaeng as Geum Eo-san; Im Hyuk – New Tales of Gisaeng as Ah Soo-ra; Noh Joo-hyun – Living in Style as Jo Yong-pal	**Kim Hye-ok** – **Scent of a Woman as Kim Soon-jung**; Kim Hye-sun – New Tales of Gisaeng as Han Soon-deok; Kim Mi-sook – My Love By My Side as Bong Sun-ah; Park Joon-geum – While You Were Sleeping as Mrs. Jang
Netizen Popularity Award, Actor	Netizen Popularity Award, Actress
**Lee Min-ho** – **City Hunter as Lee Yoon-sung**; Han Suk-kyu – Deep Rooted Tree as King Sejong; Jang Hyuk – Deep Rooted Tree as Kang Chae-yoon; Ji Sung – Protect the Boss as Cha Ji-heon; Kim Rae-won – A Thousand Days' Promise as Park Ji-hyung; Lee Dong-wook – Scent of a Woman as Kang Ji-wook	**Choi Kang-hee** – **Protect the Boss as Noh Eun-seol**; Kim Sun-a – Scent of a Woman as Lee Yeon-jae; Lee Yo-won – 49 Days as Song Yi-kyung; Soo Ae – A Thousand Days' Promise as Lee Seo-yeon
Best Couple Award	Producer's Award
**Ji Sung** and **Choi Kang-hee** **(Protect the Boss)**; Jang Hyuk and Lee Min-jung (Midas); Ji Chang-wook and Shin Hyun-bin (Warrior Baek Dong-soo); Kim Jaejoong and Wang Ji-hye (Protect the Boss); Kim Rae-won and Soo Ae (A Thousand Days' Promise); Lee Dong-wook and Kim Sun-a (Scent of a Woman); Lee Min-ho and Park Min-young (City Hunter); Lee So-yeon and Lee Jae-yoon (My Love By My Side); Park Shin-yang and Kim Ah-joong (Sign); Sung Hoon and Im Soo-hyang (New Tales of Gisaeng)	**Song Joong-ki** – **Deep Rooted Tree as teenage Yi Do**; **Lee Yo-won** – **49 Days as Song Yi-kyung**

=== Top 10 Stars ===
- Choi Kang-hee – Protect the Boss
- Han Suk-kyu – Deep Rooted Tree
- Jang Hyuk – Midas, Deep Rooted Tree
- Ji Sung – Protect the Boss
- Kim Rae-won – A Thousand Days' Promise
- Kim Sun-a – Scent of a Woman
- Lee Dong-wook – Scent of a Woman
- Lee Min-ho – City Hunter
- Lee Yo-won – 49 Days
- Soo Ae – A Thousand Days' Promise, Athena: Goddess of War

=== New Star Award ===
- Goo Hara – City Hunter
- Im Soo-hyang – New Tales of Gisaeng
- Ji Chang-wook – Warrior Baek Dong-soo
- Jin Se-yeon – My Daughter the Flower
- Jeong Yu-mi – A Thousand Days' Promise
- Kim Jaejoong – Protect the Boss
- Lee Jae-yoon – My Love By My Side
- Seo Hyo-rim – Scent of a Woman
- Shin Hyun-bin – Warrior Baek Dong-soo
- Sung Hoon – New Tales of Gisaeng
- Wang Ji-hye – Protect the Boss
