= Wang Ji-hye =

South Korean actress (born 1985)

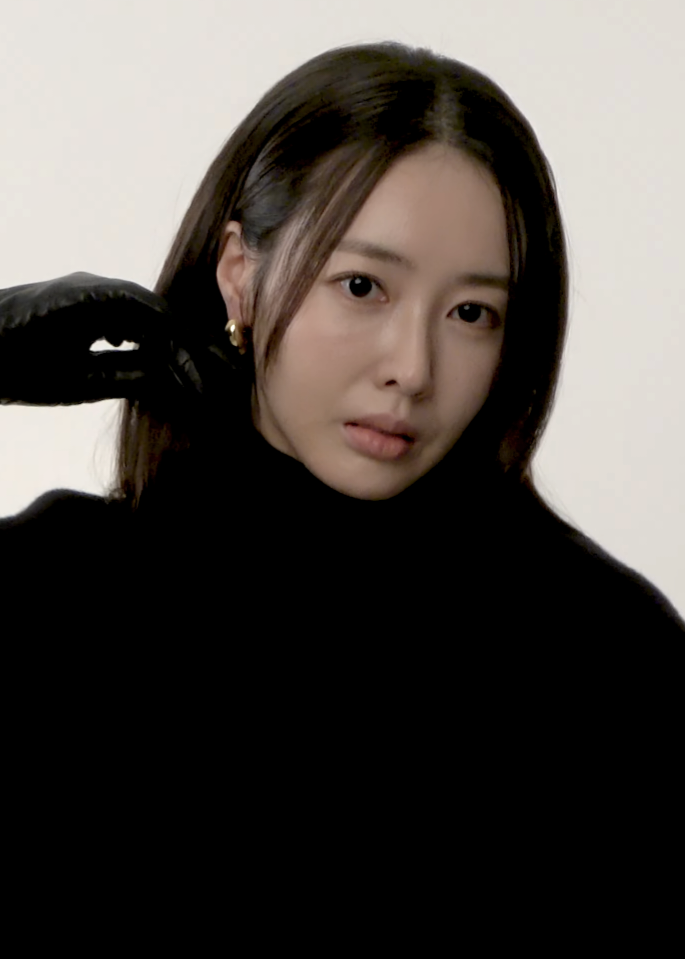
- Wang in November 2024
- Born: December 29, 1985 (age 40); Masan, South Gyeongsang Province, South Korea
- Other name: Min Ji-hye
- Education: Konkuk University – Film Arts
- Occupation: Actress
- Years active: 2003–present
- Agent(s): People Story Company (2018–present)

Korean name
- Hangul: 왕지혜
- RR: Wang Jihye
- MR: Wang Chihye

Former stage name
- Hangul: 민지혜
- RR: Min Jihye
- MR: Min Chihye

Wang Ji-hye (Korean: 왕지혜; born December 29, 1985) is a South Korean actress best known for her roles in Protect the Boss, Friend, Our Legend, The President, and Personal Taste.

== Filmography ==
=== Television series ===
| Year | Title | Role | Notes |
|---|---|---|---|
| 2003 | Something About 1% | Han Joo-hee | Main role / Villainous protagonist |
| 2003 | MBC Best Theater: "To You Who Dream of Extreme Love" | Lee Ha-yeon | Main role / Protagonist (anti-hero) |
| 2003 | MBC Best Theater: "Better Than Lover" | | Main antagonist |
| 2004 | Beijing My Love | Wang Sa-rang | Main antagonist |
| 2004 | MBC Best Theater: "Bad Girl" | Min-ji | Main antagonist |
| 2004 | Drama City: "Boo-yong of Mt. Kyeryong" | Boo-yong | Main antagonist |
| 2006 | The Life and Death Love | | Main antagonist |
| 2007 | How to Meet a Perfect Neighbor | Go Hye-mi | Main antagonist |
| 2008 | The Shanghai Brothers | | Main antagonist |
| 2009 | Friend, Our Legend | Choi Jin-sook | Main antagonist |
| 2010 | Personal Taste | Kim In-hee | Main antagonist |
| 2010 | The President | Jang In-young | Main antagonist |
| 2011 | Protect the Boss | Seo Na-yoon | Main antagonist |
| 2011 | Bachelor's Vegetable Store | Jin Jin-shim / Mok Ga-on | Main antagonist |
| 2012 | Cheer Up, Mr. Kim! | Lee Woo-kyung | Main antagonist |
| 2013 | The Suspicious Housekeeper | Yoon Song-hwa | Main antagonist |
| 2014 | Hotel King | Song Chae-kyung | Main antagonist |
| 2014 | Birth of a Beauty | Gyo Chae-yeon | Main antagonist |
| 2016 | Yeah, That's How It Is | Han Yu-ri | Main antagonist |
| 2016 | Bubbly Lovely | Eun Bang-wool | Main antagonist |
| 2018 | Player | Ryu Hyun-ja | Special appearance |
| 2020 | Oh My Baby | Seo Jung-won | |
| 2021 | Be My Dream Family | Han Geu-roo | |
| 2023 | Oh! Youngsim | Oh Jin-sim | |
| 2024 | Iron Family | Lee Mi-yeon | |

=== Film ===
| Year | Title | Role |
|---|---|---|
| 2000 | Picture Diary | Secretary |
| 2006 | The Fox Family | Convenience store girl |
| 2007 | Beautiful Sunday | Soo-yeon |
| 2010 | Le Grand Chef 2: Kimchi Battle | Jin-soo |

=== Music video appearances ===
| Year | Song title | Artist |
|---|---|---|
| 2002 | "To Be Continued" | Click-B |
| 2002 | "어두워지기전에" | Yarn |
| 2002 | "Happy Memories Are" | jtL |
| 2006 | "White Lie" | Lee Seung-gi |
| 2006 | "Eternity" | Kim Chang-hyun |

== Awards and nominations ==
| Year | Award | Category | Nominated work | Result |
|---|---|---|---|---|
| 2003 | Andre Kim Best Star Awards | New Star Award | | Won |
| 2003 | MTV Superstar Style Awards | Newcomer Award | | Won |
| 2011 | SBS Drama Awards | New Star Award | Protect the Boss | Won |
| 2011 | SBS Drama Awards | Special Acting Award, Actress in a Drama Special | Protect the Boss | Nominated |
| 2012 | KBS Drama Awards | Excellence Award, Actress in a Daily Drama | Cheer Up, Mr. Kim! | Nominated |
| 2013 | SBS Drama Awards | Excellence Award, Actress in a Drama Special | The Suspicious Housekeeper | Nominated |
