= Bohemian (band) =

South Korean musical group

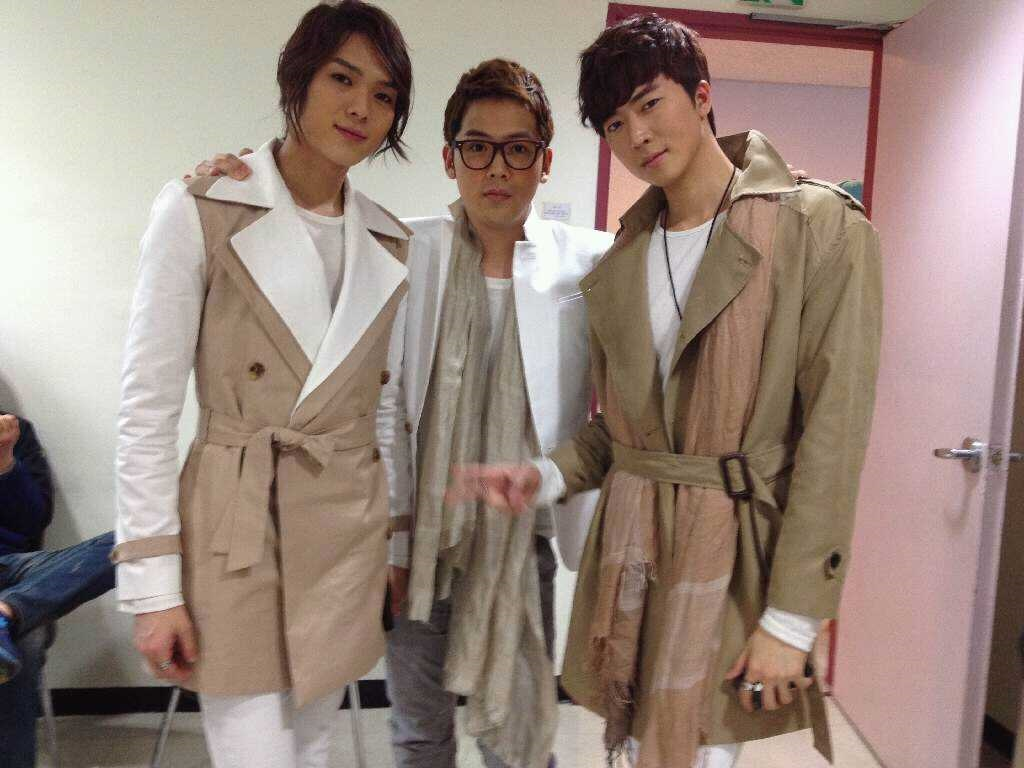
- Bohemian ready to perform in Seoul, April 2012; Left to right: Yoo Kyu Sang, Kim Yong Jin, Park Sang Woo

Background information
- Origin: Seoul, South Korea
- Genre: Pop
- Years active: 2010–present
- Labels: Kingpin Entertainment, prior HMG Entertainment (South Korea); LOEN Entertainment (South Korea)
- Members: Park Sang Woo; Kim Yong Jin; Yoo Kyu Sang
- Website: www.hmgent.co.kr (in Korean) www.iloen.com (in Korean)

Bohemian (Korean: 보헤미안, Japanese: ボヘミアン; stylized as BOHEMIAN), is a three-member South Korean pop/ballad group, that along with group endeavors, has recorded many soundtracks, abbreviated as OSTs, for South Korean films and Korean drama or k-drama for television in South Korea, as individual artists. The group is composed of Park Sang Woo (Korean: 박상우), Kim Yong Jin (Korean: 김용진), and Yoo Kyu Sang (Korean: 유규상). Bohemian debuted in 2010 with members Park Sang Woo and Yoo Kyu Sang. In 2012, they were joined by Kim Yong Jin. The group is managed by HMG Entertainment, with recordings released by their distribution company, LOEN Entertainment. Through a LOEN Entertainment agreement with Viki, a video streaming site, both Kim Yong Jin and Bohemian are listed as artists, and their music videos can be viewed.

== History ==
Park Sang Woo is the group's leader. He was born on April 16, 1986, is 185 cm tall and has a level 2 Taekwondo certification. Park is a regular cast member of Saturday Night Live Korea or SNL Korea on cable network TVN or tvN. One of Park's OSTs was "I Love You Again and Again" for the 2009 drama The City Hall. From December, 2013 - January, 2014 Park performed as dancer/chorus, with solo for the musical "December: Unfinished Song", written and directed by Jang Jin and performed at Sejong Center, with lead roles performed by Junsu of JYJ and actor/singer Park Gun-hyung. On March 14, 2014, Park announced on Twitter his sudden decision to enter the military, and entered quietly on March 18.

Yoo Kyu Sang, the youngest of the group, was born on June 22, 1988, and is 181 cm tall. Yoo started an early modeling career at Cheonan High School, and participated in a 2010 music video released by Psy and Kim Jang-hoon, "Ring For Me Once Again".

The duo debuted as Bohemian in 2010, released their first album, "Love Letter", and appeared on several televised music programs with the single of the same title.

Kim Yong Jin, the oldest of the group, was born on October 18, 1982, and is 178 cm tall. Kim graduated from Yeoju Institute of Technology and has completed his Conscription in South Korea. Kim is also known by the single letter "I" and released his first album, "Soulmate" in 2007. One of Kim's latest OSTs was the theme song "Hurt" for the drama Cruel City, also known as Heartless City, which aired on JTBC from May–July, 2013. On December 3, 2015, Kim appeared as a "skilled vocalist" participant on I Can See Your Voice, singing one of his Spring Day OSTs.

After Kim Yong Jin joined Bohemian in 2012, the group released albums "Don't Hurt" and "There Is No Sun", followed by appearances on several music programs with singles, of the same titles. On variety shows, Park Sang Woo has done singing impressions, including Girls' Generation "The Boys". Also on variety shows, Bohemian members Park Sang Woo and Yoo Kyu Sang have done a dance parody of Michael Jackson "Billie Jean" and Rain "Rainism"; and Kim Yong Jin has performed a couple's dance with comedian Sayuri. Bohemian's latest digital single, "Send, Bye, Sorry" was released August 2, 2013.

== Discography ==
=== Albums ===
Title	Album details	Peak chart positions	Track listing
Title	Album details	KOR	Track listing
Soulmate	Released: March 22, 2007; Label: LOEN Entertainment; Artist: Kim Yong Jin	—	Track listing: 1. "One Person (한사람)"; 2. "Habits (습관)"; 3. "The Breakup (이별을 말하다)"; 4. "Don't Say Goodbye"; 5. "After Effect (후유증)"; 6. "The Words That I Love You (그대를 사랑한단 말)"; 7. "First Love (첫 사랑)"; 8. "Shooting Love (사랑을 쏘다)"; 9. "Again and Again" (자꾸만)"; 10. "Couldn't Be Better Than This" (이보다 더 좋을순 없다)"; 11. "I Wish More Every Day" (하루씩 더 바랍니다)"; 12. "Is It Okay (그래도 될까)"; 13. "Do Not Leave" (떠나지 말아요)"; 14. "Hi (안녕)"(remake)
Love Letter	Released: August 25, 2010; Label: Kingpin Entertainment; Artists: Park Sang Woo, Yoo Kyu Sang	—	Track listing: 1. "Love Letter"; 2. "My Angel"; 3. "To Love and Be Loved (사랑하고 사랑합니다)"; 4. "Love Letter" (Inst.); 5. "My Angel" (Inst.)
Don't Hurt (아프지마)	Released: March 16, 2012; Label: LOEN Entertainment; Artists: Park Sang Woo, Kim Yong Jin, Yoo Kyu Sang	—	Track listing: 1. "Don't Hurt (아프지마)"; 2. "Standing Here (여기 서있다); 3. "Eyes, Nose, Mouth (눈코입)"; 4. "Don't Hurt (아프지마)" (Inst.); 5. "Standing Here (여기 서있다)" (Inst.); 6. "Eyes, Nose, Mouth (눈코입)" (Inst.)
There is no Sun (태양은 없다)	Released: June 29, 2012; Label: LOEN Entertainment; Artists: Park Sang Woo, Kim Yong Jin, Yoo Kyu Sang	—	Track listing: 1. "There is no Sun (태양은 없다)"; 2. "Don't Hurt (아프지마)"; 3. "Standing Here (여기 서있다)"; 4. "Eyes, Nose, Mouth (눈코입)"; 5. "Don't Hurt (아프지마) duet, Park Sang Woo, Yoo Seung Eun
"—" denotes releases that did not chart or were not released in that region.

=== Singles ===
Title	Details	Peak chart positions	Track listing
Title	Details	KOR	Track listing
I Love You Noona ("사랑해요 누나)	Released: July 10, 2008; Label: Kingpin Entertainment; Artist: Park Sang Woo	—	Track listing: 1. "I Love You Noona ("사랑해요 누나)"; 2. "Don't Say (말하지마)"
Don't Say (말하지마)	Released: September 26, 2008; Label: Kingpin Entertainment; Artist: Park Sang Woo	—	Track listing: 1. "Don't Say (말하지마)"; 2. "On a Rainy Night (비오는 밤)"
Is There Love (사랑이 있을까)	Released: October 14, 2008; Label: LOEN Entertainment; Artist: Kim Yong Jin	—	Track listing: 1. "Is There Love (사랑이 있을까)"; 2. "It Was Not (참 못됐습니다)"
Knockin On My Heart (내 마음에 노크)	Released: May 20, 2009; Label: Kingpin Entertainment; Artist: Park Sang Woo	—	Track listing: 1. "Knockin On My Heart (내 마음에 노크)
Don't Be Sick (아프지마)	Released: April 30, 2013; Label: LOEN Entertainment; Artist: Kim Yong Jin, Yoo Seong Eun	—	Track listing: 1. "Don't Be Sick (아프지마)"; 2. "Don't Be Sick" (inst.)
Send, Bye, Sorry (보.헤.미안)	Released: August 2, 2013; Label: LOEN Entertainment; Artists: Park Sang Woo, Kim Yong Jin, Yoo Kyu Sang	—	Track listing: 1. "Send, Bye, Sorry (보.헤.미안)
It's Not (아니라고)	Released: January 21, 2015; Label: LOEN Entertainment; Artists: Yoo Kyu Sang	—	Track listing: 1. "It's Not (아니라고)"; 2. "It's Not (아니라고) (Inst.)"
Calling Out (불러본다)	Released: June 9, 2015; Label: LOEN Entertainment; Artists: Kim Yong Jin	—	Track listing: 1. "Calling Out (불러본다)"; 2. "Calling Out (불러본다) (Inst.)"
Nonsense (헛소리)	Released: February 24, 2016; Label: LOEN Entertainment; Artists: Kim Yong Jin	—	Track listing: 1. "Nonsense (헛소리)"
"—" denotes releases that did not chart or were not released in that region.

=== Soundtracks ===
==== Film ====
Year	Title	Film	Artist
2003	"Happy End (행복 한 끝)"	Garden of Heaven	Kim Yong Jin
2005	"Remember Me (기억해줘)"	Sad Movie	Kim Yong Jin
2006	"After Effect (후유증)"	How the Lack of Love Affects Two Men	Kim Yong Jin
2008	"Fool(바보)"	BABO	Kim Yong Jin
2008	"Outside Love (외사랑)"	BABO	Kim Yong Jin

==== TV Series ====
Year	Title	TV Series	Artist
2004	"Unfinished Story (끝나지 않은 이야기)"	Match Made in Heaven	Kim Yong Jin
2005	"Spring Days (봄날)"	Spring Day	Kim Yong Jin
2005	"Don't Go (봄날)"	Spring Day	Kim Yong Jin
2005	"Rather (차라리)"	Spring Day	Kim Yong Jin
2005	"Remember Me (기억해줘)"	Spring Day	Kim Yong Jin
2008	"Real Bad (참 못됐습니다)"	Robber	Kim Yong Jin
2008	"Don't Tell Me (말하지마)"	Kko Kko Tours Single♥Single	Park Sang Woo
2009	"Is There Love (사랑이 있을까)"	Will It Snow for Christmas?	Kim Yong Jin
2009	"Knockin On My Heart (내 마음에 쫓 고)"	Cinderella Man	Park Sang Woo
2009	"Always (항상)"	No Limit	Park Sang Woo
2009	"And Now (그리고 지금)"	Dream	Park Sang Woo
2009	"A Song For A Fool (바보를 위한 노래)"	You're Beautiful	Park Sang Woo
2009	"I Love You Again and Again (사랑하고 사랑합니다)"	The City Hall	Park Sang Woo
2010	"That Man (그사람)"	Jejungwon	Park Sang Woo
2011	"Deep Love (깊은 사랑)"	Deep Rooted Tree	Kim Yong Jin
2012	"You In My Arms (그대 내 품에)"	Bridal Mask	Kim Yong Jin
2013	"Hurt (상처)"	Cruel City	Kim Yong Jin
2013	"Waiting For You (기다린다)"	Hold My Hand	Kim Yong Jin
2014	"Love...Remember (사랑... 기억)"	Only Love	Kim Yong Jin
2014	"Knife (칼)"	The Three Musketeers	Kim Yong Jin
2015	"Two Leaf Clover (두잎 클로버)"	Bird That Doesn't Cry	Kim Yong Jin
2015	"Trying To Forget (잊어보려한다)"	The Mother and Daughter-in-Law	Kim Yong Jin
2015	"Us (우리)"	A Daughter Just Like You	Kim Yong Jin
2015	"Close My Eyes (눈감아도)"	Witch's Castle	Kim Yong Jin
2016	"Call (부른다)"	Glamorous Temptation	Kim Yong Jin

== Concerts and Performances ==
- Lotte World, August 8(2012)
- Banpo Music Festival, June 8 (2013)

== Musicals ==
Year	Title	Role	Notes	Artist
December 16, 2013- January 29, 2014	December: Unfinished Song	Chorus(Solo), Dancer	Written/Directed by Jang Jin. Lead roles by Junsu of JYJ and Park Gun-hyung.	Park Sang Woo

== Television ==
=== Music Shows ===
==== Inkigayo ====
Year	Date	Song	Artist(s)
2007	April 22	"Talk About Separation"	Kim Yong Jin
2010	October 31	"Love Letter"	Park Sang Woo, Yoo Kyu Sang
2010	November 21	"Love Letter"	Park Sang Woo, Yoo Kyu Sang
2010	December 5	"Love Letter"	Park Sang Woo, Yoo Kyu Sang
2012	March 11	"Don't Hurt"	Park Sang Woo, Kim Yong Jin, Yoo Kyu Sang
2012	April 1	"Don't Hurt"	Park Sang Woo, Kim Yong Jin, Yoo Kyu Sang

==== Music Bank ====
Year	Date	Song	Artist(s)
2010	October 1	"Love Letter"	Park Sang Woo, Yoo Kyu Sang
2012	March 16	"Don't Hurt"	Park Sang Woo, Kim Yong Jin, Yoo Kyu Sang

==== M Countdown ====
Year	Date	Song	Artist(s)
2010	December 23	"Love Letter"	Park Sang Woo, Yoo Kyu Sang
2012	March 8	"Don't Hurt"	Park Sang Woo, Kim Yong Jin, Yoo Kyu Sang

==== Show Champion ====
Year	Date	Song	Artist(s)
2012	April 10	"Don't Hurt"	Park Sang Woo, Kim Yong Jin, Yoo Kyu Sang
2012	July 10	"There Is No Sun"	Park Sang Woo, Kim Yong Jin, Yoo Kyu Sang

=== Other appearances ===
Year	Title	Ep./Artist	Network
2012	Simply Kpop, "Don't Hurt", Stevie Wonder's "Lately"	5/22/12, Bohemian	Arirang
2012	Love Quest, "You Raise Me Up"	6/9/12, Bohemian	KBS
2012	World Changing Quiz Show	Ep. 147, Bohemian	MBC
2012	Quiz Show Q	Pt. 3 K Pop Star, Bohemian	MBC
2013	Faldo Rambling Band (팔도 방랑밴드)	Ep. 2, Park Sang Woo	TVN

== Radio ==
Year	Title	Artist	Network
2012	This Beautiful Morning, This is Kim Chang-wan	Bohemian	SBS Power FM

== Others ==
- Digital Single, 2013, Kim Yong-Jin (Bohemian), Yoo Seong Eun(용진(보헤미안), 유성은)- "Don't Be Sick(아프지마)"
