= Kim Young-ok =

South Korean actress (born 1937)

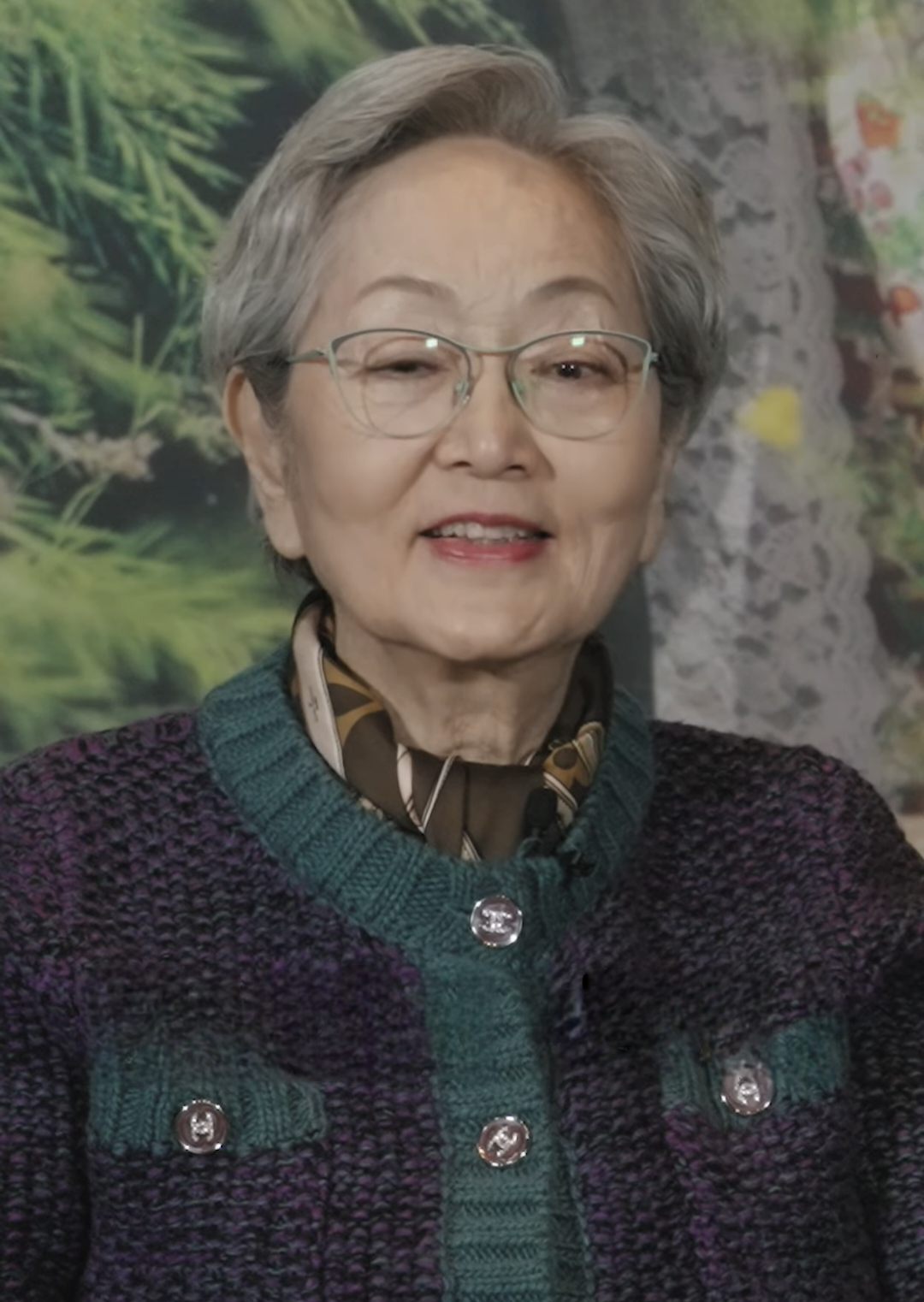
- Kim in February 2024
- Born: December 5, 1937 (age 88); Keijō, Korea, Empire of Japan
- Occupations: Actress; voice actress; entertainer
- Years active: 1959–present
- Spouse: Kim Young-gil (m. 1960; died 2026)
- Children: 3
- Awards: Bogwan Order of Cultural Merit (2018)

Korean name
- Hangul: 김영옥
- Hanja: 金英玉
- RR: Gim Yeongok
- MR: Kim Yŏngok

YouTube information
- Channel: 김영옥 KIM YOUNG OK
- Years active: 2025–present
- Subscribers: 182 thousand
- Views: 80.1 million
- Last updated: August 14, 2026

Signature
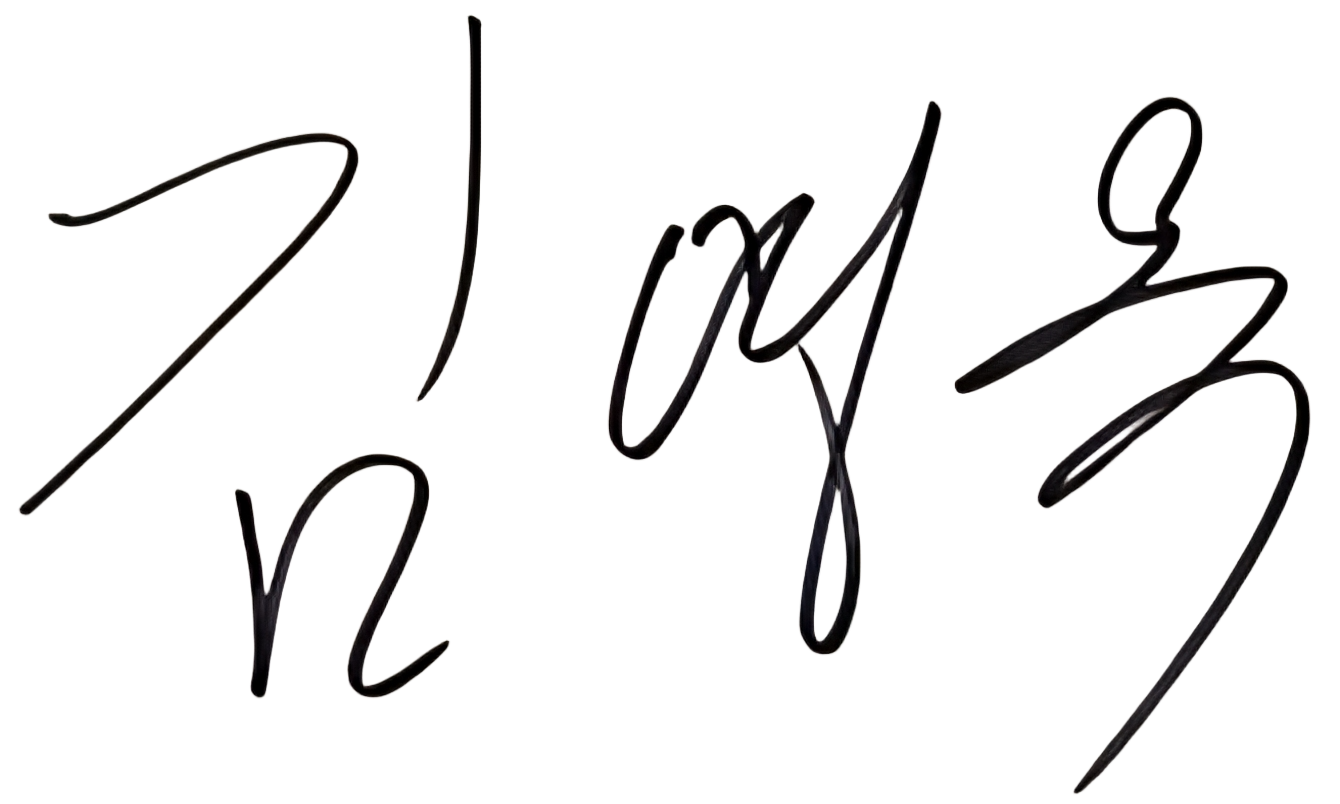

Kim Young-ok (Korean: 김영옥; born December 5, 1937) is a South Korean actress who debuted in 1957. She is known as South Korea's "National Grandma" for her many portrayals of grandmothers in film and television.

== Career ==
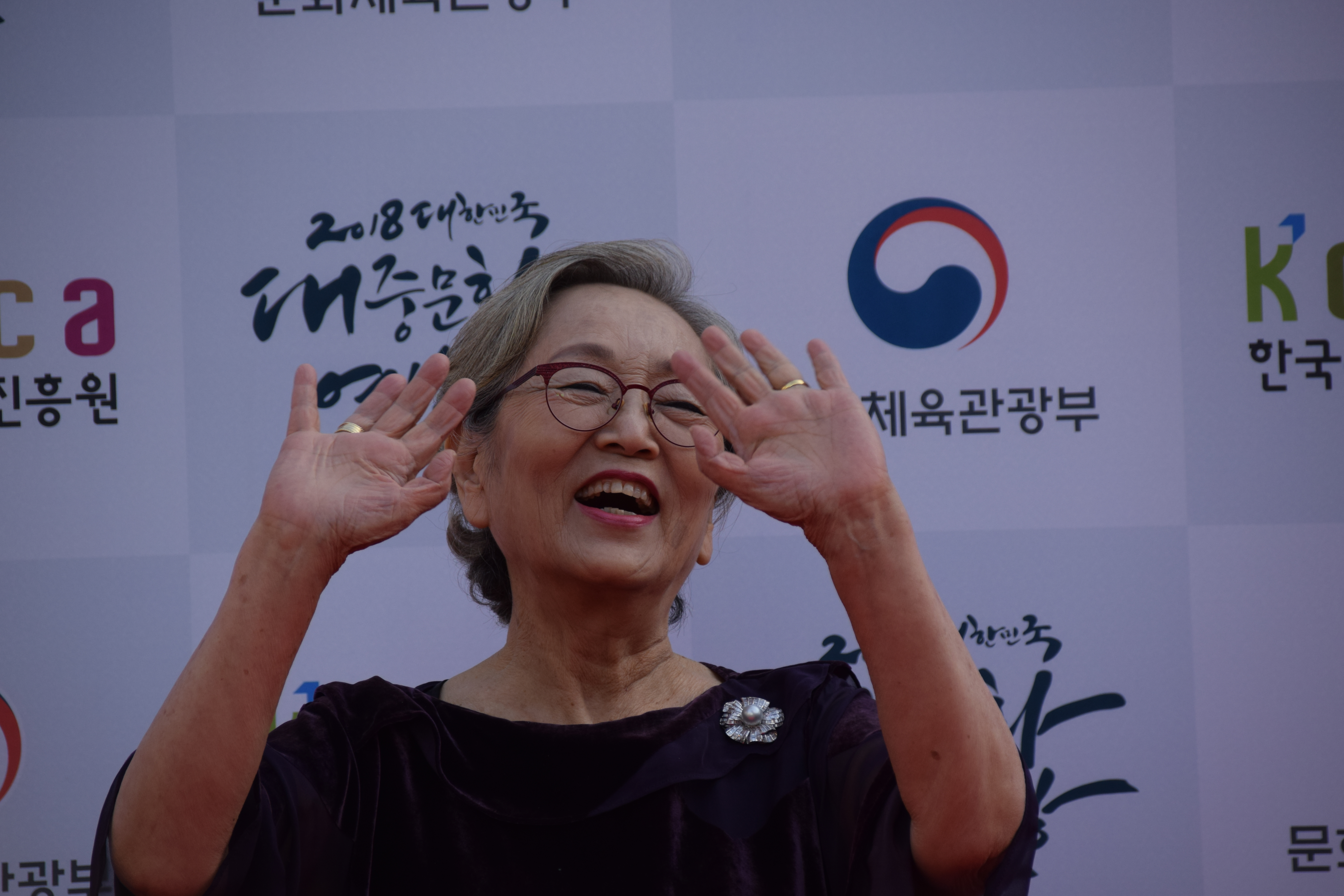
Kim in 2018

In 1959, Kim joined the Chuncheon Broadcasting Station as an announcer through open recruitment. In 1960, She re-entered the CBS Christian Broadcasting Company as a voice actor for the 6th term. A year later, in 1961, she officially debuted as a voice actor for the 1st round of MBC Cultural Broadcasting, and in 1969 appeared in MBC TV drama for the first time.

Kim Young-ok is one of Korea's representative actors who has been active without a hiatus since her debut. Currently, she is the oldest active actress in Korea.

In August 2025, Kim launched a YouTube channel, which began with a video of her doing an internet challenge, and another announcing a fan signing event.

== Filmography ==
Kim (left) in the 1959 film Even the Clouds Are Drifting

=== Film ===
Year	Title	Role	Notes	Ref.
1957	Farewell Sorrow!			
1958	Open the Door to a Pure Heart			
1959	Bear			
1959	Even the Clouds Are Drifting			
1961	A Shoeshine Boy			
1963	The Mistress			
1966	Have Cake and Eat It, Too			
1967	Flame in the Valley			
1968	A Young Bride			
1968	A Young Zelkova			
1970	Mi-ae			
1980	Man-suk, Run!			
1986	No Woman Is Afraid of the Night	Housekeeper		
1987	The Chef of 8 Provinces	Mokpo chef		
1988	Puppy Love			
1990	Watercolor Painting in a Rainy Day	Nanny		
1990	The Lovers of Woomook-baemi	Il-do's mother		
1999	White Valentine	Flower shop lady		
2003	Spring Breeze	Seon-guk's mother		
2003	A Man Who Has Been Revealed	Middle-aged woman		
2004	Springtime	Jae-il's grandmother		
2006	Old Miss Diary: The Movie	Young-ok		
2007	Big Bang	Yang Chul-gon's mother		
2007	Soo	Police officer Seo's grandmother	Cameo	
2008	Public Enemy Returns	Kang Chul-joong's mother		
2008	Our School's E.T.	Chun Sung-geun's mother		
2010	Le Grand Chef 2: Kimchi Battle	Yeo-sang's mother		
2011	Sunny	Im Na-mi's grandmother		
2012	Spring, Snow	Mother		
2013	Fists of Legend	Mother-in-law		
2015	Casa Amor: Exclusive for Ladies	Chairwoman Yeon		
2015	Granny's Got Talent	Grandmother shaman	Cameo	
2015	Makgeolli Girls			
2015	Bean Sprouts	Gong Na-mul's mother	Cameo	
2017	Snowy Road	Choi Jong-boon (adult)		
2021	Nothing Serious	Ja-young's grandmother		
2022	Take Care of Mom		Lead Role	
2024	Picnic	Geum-soon		

=== Television series ===
Year	Title	Role	Notes	Ref.
1978	Master			
1978	I Sell Happiness			
1981	Se-ah			
1985	The Seaside Village			
1986	Love and Ambition	Hae-young's aunt		
1988	Forget Tomorrow			
1988	Teacher, Our Teacher			
1988	The Last Idol			
1989	Wang Rung's Kin			
1989	Flowering Nest			
1989	Carousel			
1989	Armband			
1990	That Woman			
1990	My Mother			
1991	Yesterday's Green Grass			
1993	Long Time Ago When I Was Young			
1993	Wild Chrysanthemum			
1993	To Live			
1993	3rd Republic	Paek Namŭi, Park Chung Hee's mother		
1993	Sergeant Oh			
1993	MBC Best Theater: "Sundal, Byeonggu, and Okju"	Ms. Yeo		
1994	MBC Best Theater: "Street Sign Buddha"	Abandoned grandmother		
1994	The Woman in the Matchbox			
1995	The Road	Mrs. Song		
1995	Another Beginning			
1996	Wealthy Yu-chun			
1996	The Most Beautiful Goodbye in the World	Sang Joo-daek		
1996	Until We Can Love			
1996	The Scent of Winter			
1997	Golden Feather			
1997	The Reason I Live	Kim Sook-hee		
1997	Beautiful Crime			
1997	Bridal Room			
1998	A Bird's Gift	Maternal grandmother		
1998	Love is All I Know			
1998	Please Find My Dad			
1998	You and My Song			
2000	Wang Rung's Land	Oh Ran		
2000	Ajumma	Sam-sook's maternal grandmother		
2001	Wonderful Days	Grandmother		
2001	Morning Without Parting	Kim Kyung-hee		
2002	Successful Story of a Bright Girl	Cha Yang-soon's grandmother		
2002	Since We Met	Kang Min-seok's grandmother		
2002	Solitude	Kim Il-soon		
2002	The Maengs' Golden Era	Han Eul-soon		
2003	Yellow Handkerchief	Grandmother Son		
2003	Bodyguard	Na-young's maternal grandmother		
2003	Pearl Necklace	Kim Ki-nam's grandmother		
2004	More Beautiful Than a Flower	Woo-sik's grandmother		
2004	Tropical Nights in December	Hospice patient	Cameo	
2004	Old Miss Diary	Young-ok		
2004	Toji, the Land	Gan-nan's grandmother		
2005	Take My Hand			
2005	Bizarre Bunch	Seo Mal-ja		
2005	Let's Marry	Jung Jae-won's grandmother		
2006	Special of My Life	Jung Hyung-seok's mother		
2006	Snow Flower	Lee Kang-ae's mother		
2006	Miracle	Jang Young-chul's mother		
2007	Dal-ja's Spring	Lee Kkeut-soon		
2007	Crazy in Love	Han Bok-ja		
2007	Coffee Prince	Choi Han-kyul's grandmother		
2007	Fly High	Jo Ok-young		
2007	Likeable or Not	Mrs. Choi		
2007	New Heart			
2008	Aster	Ulgeum woman		
2008	Chil-woo the Mighty	Woman from Mungdung		
2008	Family's Honor	Yoon Sam-wol		
2009	Glory of Youth	Bae Yong-jin's mother		
2009	Boys Over Flowers	Head maid		
2009	Partner	Go Myung-ja	Cameo (Episode 9)	
2009	Children of Heaven			
2009	Jolly Widows	Park Jung-nyeo		
2009	Assorted Gems	Kyul Myung-ja	Television show	
2009	The Slave Hunters	Hwang Chul-woong's mother		
2009	Gloria	Oh Soon-nyeo		
2009	All My Love For You	Kim Young-ok		
2010	Master of Study	Lee Boon-yi		
2011	Paradise Ranch			
2011	My Bittersweet Life	Choi Jung-ok		
2011	Bravo, My Love!	Nam Da-reum's grandmother	Cameo	
2011	Protect the Boss	Mrs. Song		
2011	Just Like Today	Oh Gap-boon		
2011	Brain	Sa Bong-ja	Cameo	
2011	Saving Mrs. Go Bong-shil	Kim Geum-shil		
2012	The Strongest K-Pop Survival	Kwon Ji-woo's grandmother		
2012	Love, My Love	Lee Geum-nyeo		
2012	Standby	Young-ok, Park Joon-geum's mother	Cameo	
2012	Lovers of Haeundae	Shim Mal-nyun		
2012	My Lover, Madame Butterfly	Yoo Geum-dan		
2012	Here Comes Mr. Oh	Chun Geum-soon		
2013	Ruby Ring	Jo Il-soon		
2013	KBS Drama Special: "Yeon-woo's Summer"	Lee Yeon-woo's grandmother		
2014	Beyond the Clouds	Hong Soon-ok		
2014	Make Your Wish	Chairman Choi		
2014	Marriage, Not Dating	Noh Geum-soon		
2014	Rosy Lovers	Jo Bang-shil		
2014	Birth of a Beauty	Lee Kang-joon's grandmother		
2015	KBS Drama Special: "Snowy Road"	older Choi Jong-boon		
2015	The Return of Hwang Geum-bok	Wang Yeo-sa		
2015	Reply 1988	Duk Seon's grandmother		
2015	All About My Mom	Song Ki-nam		
2016	Dear My Friends	Oh Ssang-boon		
2016	Blow Breeze	Dal-rae		
2016	Shopping King Louie	Choi Il-soon		
2016	Listen to Love		Cameo	
2016	Sweet Stranger and Me	Grandma Oh Rye	Cameo (Episode 7)	
2017	Sisters-in-Law	Kang Hae-Soon		
2017	Manhole	(voice only)		
2017	Live Up to Your Name	Kkot-boon		
2017	The Most Beautiful Goodbye	Grandma		
2018	Welcome to Waikiki	Jang-gun's grandma	Cameo (Episode 4)	
2018	Tempted	Grandma		
2018	The Rich Son	Park Sun-ok		
2018	Ms. Hammurabi	O-reum's grandma		
2018	Witch's Love	Maeng Ye-soon		
2018	KBS Drama Special: "My Mother's Third Marriage"	Bang Cho-rong		
2018	My Strange Hero	Lee Sun-hye		
2019	The Light in Your Eyes	Lee Joon-ha's grandmother		
2019	Her Private Life	Deok-Mi's grandmother		
2019	The Golden Garden	Kang Nam-doo		
2019	Love with Flaws	Chairwoman Han		
2020	The King: Eternal Monarch	Noh Ok-nam		
2021	Mouse	Grandmother who lives alone with Oh Bong-i		
2021	Jirisan	Lee Moon-ok		
2021	Hometown Cha-Cha-Cha	Kim Gam-ri		
2021–2022	Young Lady and Gentleman	Jin Dal-rae		
2022	Bravo, My Life	Seo Dong-hee's grandmother	Cameo	
2022	Tomorrow	Lee Jeong-moon	Cameo (Episode 13)	
2022	The Law Cafe	Wol-seon	Cameo	
2022–2023	Vengeance of the Bride	Park Yong-ja		
2023	King the Land	Cha Soon-hee		
2024	The Midnight Studio	So Geum-soon		
2024	Iron Family	Ahn Gil-rye		
2024	The Judge from Hell	Oh Mi-ja		

=== Television shows ===
Year	Title	Role	Ref.
2013	Mamado ("Mama, Too")	Cast member	
2016	Tribe of Hip Hop	Participant	
2022	Attack on Grandma	Host	
2022	Hot Singers	Cast member	
2022	Prefabricated Family	Host	

=== Web series ===
Year	Title	Role	Notes	Ref.
2019–2021	Love Alarm	Jo-jo's grandmother	Season 1–2	
2021	Squid Game	Seong Gi-hun's mother		
2022	Pachinko	older Bokhee		
2023	Not Others			
2026	Our Sticky Love	Go Young-Hong (Tae-ha's grandmother)		

=== Music video appearances ===
Year	Title	Artist	Ref.
2026	"Dear My Crazy Soulmate"	IU	

=== Voice acting ===
Year	Title	Role
1975	Mazinger Z	Soe-dol ("Juzo Kabuto")
1976	Robot Taekwon V	Kim Hoon
1977	Paul's Miraculous Adventure	Paul
1987	Esteban, a Boy from the Sun	Esteban

== Accolades ==
=== Awards and nominations ===
Year	Award	Category	Nominated work	Result	Ref.
1979	15th Baeksang Arts Awards	Grand Prize (Daesang) for Television	I Sell Happiness	Won	
1992	28th Baeksang Arts Awards	Most Popular Actress (TV)	Yesterday's Green Grass	Won	
1993	KBS Drama Awards	Top Excellence Award, Actress	Wild Chrysanthemum, Love and Farewell	Won	
2005	KBS Entertainment Awards	Achievement Award	Old Miss Diary	Won	
2007	44th Grand Bell Awards	Best Supporting Actress	Old Miss Diary: The Movie	Nominated	
2009	MBC Drama Awards	Golden Acting Award, Actress in a Serial Drama	Assorted Gems	Won	
2011	SBS Drama Awards	Achievement Award	Protect the Boss	Won	
2015	KBS Drama Awards	Excellence Award, Actress in a One-Act/Special/Short Drama	Snowy Road	Won	
2018	11th Korea Drama Awards	Lifetime Achievement Award	Kim Young-ok	Won	
2016	Scene Stealer Festival	Lifetime Achievement Award	Kim Young-ok	Won	
2024	SBS Drama Awards	Lifetime Achievement Award	The Judge from Hell	Won	

=== State honors ===
Name of country, award ceremony, year given, and name of honor
Country	Award Ceremony	Year	Honor	Ref.
South Korea	9th Korean Popular Culture and Arts Awards (Note: Honors are given at the Korean Popular Culture and Arts Awards, arranged by the Korea Creative Content Agency and hosted by the Ministry of Culture, Sports and Tourism. They are awarded to those who have contributed to the arts and South Korea's pop culture.)	2018	Bogwan Order of Cultural Merit (3rd Class)	
