= Lee Jae-yoon =

South Korean-Canadian actor and model (born 1984)

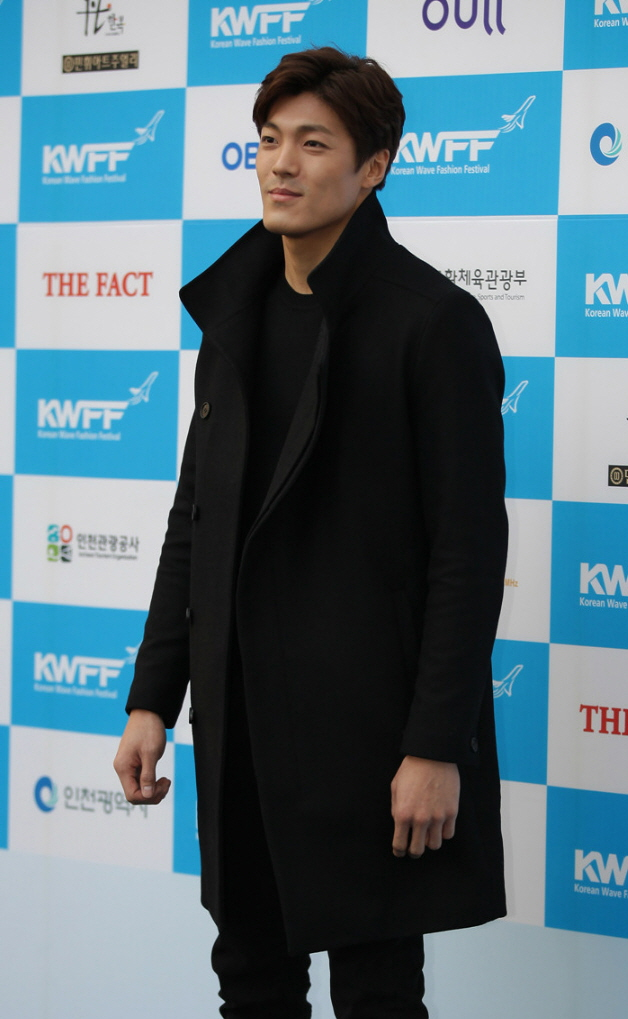
- Lee in 2015
- Born: December 15, 1984 (age 41); Seoul, South Korea
- Other name: Peter Lee
- Education: St. Elizabeth Catholic High School; University of Toronto; Dongguk University - Theater Studies
- Occupations: Actor; model; athlete
- Years active: 2004–present
- Height: 188 cm (6 ft 2 in)
- Spouse: Unknown (m. 2022)

Korean name
- Hangul: 이재윤
- RR: I Jaeyun
- MR: I Chaeyun

Lee Jae-yoon (Korean: 이재윤, born December 15, 1984) is a South Korean-Canadian actor and model. He is best known for his roles in the television dramas My Love By My Side (2011), Heartless City (2013), Weightlifting Fairy Kim Bok-joo (2015–2016) and Mother (2018).

== Early life and education ==
Lee was born to Lee Hwan-mook and Oh Young-hee in Seoul, South Korea on December 15, 1984, and raised in Toronto, Ontario, Canada. He attended the St. Elizabeth Catholic High School in Thornhill, Ontario for his secondary education. Lee was completing a degree in sports at the University of Toronto when he was scouted by a South Korean talent agency in an audition, and thus introduced into Korean show business.

Moving back to South Korea and starting his career as an actor, Lee enrolled in and would eventually complete a theater studies degree from Dongguk University, where he would later on be appointed as university ambassador.

== Career beginnings ==
In an interview, Lee disclosed that his beginnings as an actor in South Korea came with some challenges and difficulties. Besides the very competitive auditions for roles, there were also the suggestions and offers for him to do cosmetic surgery; to trim his nose, soften his jawline, and straighten his teeth. But Lee said he decided not to do any of the procedures because he felt he was doing away with what his parents have naturally given him in terms of appearance, and that he hated the thought of getting any aesthetic enhancements.

He also tried losing weight as a new actor, because it was required for him to do so. There was one project where he had to lose 10 kilograms, and he did. But Lee said it did not really open new doors for him. So, upon getting more acting experience, he decided to keep his weight and strengthen his physique instead. Now, projects and producers look for him, "because there aren't many like me. They want that masculine look, the jawline and everything. They are finally looking for that now."

== Personal life ==
Lee is a brown belt in Brazilian jiu-jitsu and had competed in tournaments, before his foray into acting and modeling. He still goes to the gym, swims, and does jiu-jitsu three or four times a week to keep his physique.

Lee has revealed his father has played a major influence on his healthy and athletic lifestyle. He says he has always been the athletic type, joining marathons in school, because his father encouraged him so. In high school, he was the fastest track and field athlete, that even his peers expected him to eventually make it to the Olympics. Lee further disclosed that aside from this parents, Bruce Lee was always an inspiration for him growing up.

As an adult, Lee maintains he is a committed fitness enthusiast; besides doing the usual rounds at the gym and jiu-jitsu, Lee is also into judo, muay thai, and deep-water diving. This healthy and athletic lifestyle even influences his choice of an ideal partner. Lee has revealed in an interview that he would be pleased to find a romantic partner in the future who is also into sports and the active lifestyle, one with whom he can swim, run, or dive.

As an athlete, Lee has been working closely with the sportswear and sports gear brand Puma, both as an endorser and ambassador. He regularly joins the Puma Run events in Singapore and Malaysia.

=== Relationship ===
On October 5, 2022, it was confirmed that Lee will hold a wedding ceremony with his girlfriend in November 2022.

== Filmography ==
=== Television series ===
Year	Title	Role
2004	Nonstop 5	
2006	Wolf	
2008	I Am Happy	
2009	Heading to the Ground	Shin Poong-chul
2010	A Man Called God	Park Chul
2010	Stormy Lovers	Lee Hyung-chul
2011	My Love By My Side	Lee So-ryong
2011	Just Like Today	Jang Ji-wan
2012	Phantom	Jo Jae-min
2013	King of Ambition	Joo Yang-heon
2013	Heartless City	Ji Hyung-min
2013	Golden Rainbow	Kim Man-won
2014	A Witch's Love	Ban Ji-yeon's blind date (cameo, episode 4)
2014	Drama Festival : The Diary of Heong Yeong-dang	Lee Chul-joo
2015	Heart to Heart	Jang Doo-soo
2015	I Have a Lover	Min Kyu-suk
2015	Glamorous Temptation	Hong Myung-ho
2016	Another Miss Oh	Han Tae-jin
2016	Weightlifting Fairy Kim Bok-joo	Jung Jae-yi
2017	Revolutionary Love	Byun Woo-sung
2018	Mother	Jin-hong
2018	The Beauty Inside	Himself (Cameo, ep 1)
2018	Less Than Evil	Kang Woo-Jun
2019	Joseon Survival Period	Jeong Ga-ik
2019	Watcher	Kim Kang-wook (Cameo)
2020	Alice	Kim Dong-ho
2021	Let Me Be Your Knight	judo master (Cameo)

=== Film ===
Year	Title	Role	Notes
2009	K&J destiny		
2012	A Company Man	Shin Ip-nam, sales	
2012	First Love Archive	Hyun Woo	Short film
2013	Weird Business		segment: "The First Love Keeper"
2014	Venus Talk	Hwang Hyun-seung	
2014	You Are My Vampire	Lee Joo-hyung	
2015	Escape	Kim Kyung-wi	Short film
2019	The Bad Guys: Reign of Chaos	Skull tattoo	
2023	12.12: The Day	Lim Hak-ju	

=== Web series ===
Year	Title	Role	Website
2005	Yap		DMB Drama

=== Variety shows ===
Year	Title	Notes/Ref.
2004	Park Chul's Entertainment Road Show	VJ
2005	Good Sunday - Banjun Drama	
2006	Happy Sunday - Choi Hong-man and Strong Friends	
2006	Happy Sunday - Heroine 6	Guest
2009	Star Secret Life	
2014	The Friends in Cebu	
2014	Law of the Jungle in Solomon Islands	Cast member (Episodes 131–136)
2015	Cool Kiz on The Block	
2017	Law of the Jungle in New Zealand	Cast member (Episodes 268–270) (after Sumatra trip)
2024	Physical: 100 Season 2 – Underground	

=== Music video appearances ===
Year	Song title	Artist
2005	"Prayer to Overcome Sadness"	Boohwal
2006	"Crescent Moon"	Wheesung
2006	"Much Laugh"	MayBee
2009	"Sunflower"	Kim Jong-wook
2010	"Sick Enough to Die"	MC Mong
2012	"Day by Day"	T-ara
2014	"Hesitating Lips"	Yoo Seung-woo

== Awards and nominations ==
Year	Award	Category	Nominated work	Result
2011	SBS Drama Awards	Excellence Award, Actor in a Weekend/Daily Drama	My Love By My Side	Nominated
2011	SBS Drama Awards	New Star Award	My Love By My Side	Won
2015	KBS Entertainment Awards	Best Newcomer Award	Cool Kiz On The Block	Won
