= Heartless City =

2013 South Korean television series

- Promotional poster
- Genre: Noir/Crime; Action; Romance
- Written by: Yoo Seong-yeol
- Directed by: Lee Jung-hyo
- Starring: Jung Kyung-ho; Lee Jae-yoon; Nam Gyu-ri
- Composer: Nam Hye-seung
- Country of origin: South Korea
- Original language: Korean
- No. of episodes: 20

Production
- Executive producers: Kim, Uno
- Producers: Kang Cheol-woo; Kim Eui-seok
- Production location: Korea
- Cinematography: Choi Yoon-man
- Editors: Lee Hyun-mi; Lee Young-rim
- Production company: DRM Media

Original release
- Network: JTBC
- Release: May 27 – July 30, 2013

Heartless City (Korean: 무정도시; RR: Mujeongdosi; lit. 'Cruel City') is a 2013 South Korean television series starring Jung Kyung-ho, Nam Gyu-ri and Lee Jae-yoon. It aired on JTBC from May 27 to July 30, 2013 on Mondays and Tuesdays at 23:00 (KST) for 20 episodes.

== Synopsis ==
This noir/crime drama revolves around the love and struggles of undercover agents and members of the nation's largest drug ring.

When Lee Kyung-mi (Go Na-eun) is murdered by drug lords, her mentee and friend Yoon Soo-min (Nam Gyu-ri) is recruited by Kyung-mi's boyfriend (Lee Jae-yoon) to try and catch the prime suspect, a mysterious figure only known as "The Doctor's Son" (Jung Kyung-ho). In a fateful encounter, Soo-min falls for The Doctor's Son, not realizing who he is. Unbeknownst to her and every other police officer, The Doctor's Son is also an undercover agent. Working under the orders of police director Min Hong Ki (Son Chang-Min), The Doctor's Son works to take down the Busan drug ring and seek revenge against the dealers who were responsible for his mother's drug addiction.

== Cast ==
=== Main ===
- Jung Kyung-ho as Jung Shi-hyun ("The Doctor's Son")
  - Sung Yoo-bin as Shi-hyun (young)

Shi-hyun grew up in a red light district/brothel until his mom died from drug overdose. He then ran away from an orphanage (to Jin-sook), and eventually became a drug courier for "Uncle Safari". Nicknamed The Doctor's Son, Shi-hyun becomes the boss of a mid-sized gang. Highly ambitious, he plots to take over the position of "Scale", his drug supplier.

- Lee Jae-yoon as Ji Hyung-min

Hyung-min graduated from the police academy with top scores and got promoted at a young age. He was studying law to join the Prosecutor's office, but he returns to the police force to avenge an undercover officer's death. Now the section chief of a special investigation unit, his goal is to take down "Scale", which leads him to Shi-hyun.

- Nam Gyu-ri as Yoon Soo-min

Soo-min grew up in an orphanage with Kyung-mi, and they treat each other like real sisters. When Kyung-mi is killed in the line of duty, Soo-min goes undercover to catch her friend's killer and finish what Kyung-mi started. However, she ends up falling for The Doctor's Son, the drug lord Kyung-mi was investigating until her untimely death.

- Son Chang-min as Min Hong-ki

Director of the police / special investigative unit.

- Kim Yoo-mi as Lee Jin-sook

The president/CEO of various adult entertainment establishments. He worked the streets at a younger age, and is a close friend to Shi-hyun's mom. He looked out for Shi-hyun as he was growing up. Along with Soo, he supports and follows Shi-hyun's direction/quest to take over the drug distribution channel.

- Choi Moo-sung as Moon Deok-bae ("Safari")

Moon Deok-bae knew Shi-hyun as a child. Their paths do not cross again until he is sent down to Busan to pursue The Doctor's Son. He taught/gave Shi-hyun a switchblade knife when he was younger, which later becomes Shi-hyun's weapon of choice.

- Yoon Hyun-min as Kim Hyun-soo

Kim Hyun-soo met Shi-hyun in prison, and they both worked under "Halibut". He is hot headed at times, but loyal to a fault.

=== Supporting ===
- Kang Se-jung as Lee Kyung-mi, an undercover agent. She is Hyung-min's girlfriend and Soo-min's older sister. She grew up with Shi-hyun at the orphanage and it is hinted that she is Shi-hyun's love interest. She dies later on after being shot in the head by a sniper during an undercover mission to catch The Doctor's Son, who happens to be Shi-hyun.
- Park Soo-young as chief of detective squad
- Kil Yong-woo as Ji Man-hee, attorney general and Hyung-min's father
- Kim Byeong-ok as Jeoul ("Scale"), head of the narcotics ring (drugs, loan sharking, adult entertainment establishments), and leader behind the scenes of "Halibut" and "Meth Kim".
- Kim Jung-hak as Ahn Kyung-chan, prosecutor
- Song Min-ji as Cha Hyo-joo, reporter
- Jung Soo-young as Oh Jung-yeon, prosecutor
- Kim Jong-goo as Jo ("Busan") aka "Chairman"

Leader of Busan gang.

- Jung Ji-soon as Jo Ha-neul

Son of Busan.

- Park Young-ji as Cha

Lawmaker and Hyo-joo's father.

- Jung Moon-sung as Shi-hyun's subordinate
- Kim Min-sang as Kim Bbong ("Meth")
- Kim Hyo-sun as Eun-soo
- Lee Moo-saeng as Detective Kim (Hyunsoo's Sources)
- Shim Min as Joo-young

Soo-min's friend since kindergarten.

- Kim Jae-hwa as Park Eun-ae
- Choi Kwon as Detective
- Lee Kyu-bok as Park Kyung ho
- Kim Soo-hwan as Prison Officer Park
- Kim Myung-heon as Sniper

== Original soundtrack ==
The soundtrack digital single "Hurt" was sung by Kim Yong-jin of pop group Bohemian. Its repetition every episode followed the dark noir theme of the series.

== International broadcast ==
- It aired in Vietnam on HTV2 from August 4, 2015, under the title Sống trong tội ác.
- It aired in Thailand on MONO Plus (in a network of MONO29) from March 5 to May 8, 2016, under the title Fị rạk meụ̄xng khæ̂n (Thai: ไฟรักเมืองแค้น).
