= Protect the Boss =

South Korean television series

- Promotional poster
- Also known as: Defend Your Boss
- Genre: Romance; Comedy; Action
- Written by: Kwon Ki-young
- Directed by: So Jung-hyun
- Starring: Ji Sung; Choi Kang-hee; Kim Jae-joong; Wang Ji-hye
- Country of origin: South Korea
- Original language: Korean
- No. of episodes: 18

Production
- Executive producer: Choi Moon-suk
- Producer: Lee Sang-baek
- Production companies: AStory Co., Ltd. Protect the Boss SPC

Original release
- Network: Seoul Broadcasting System
- Release: 3 August – 29 September 2011

Protect the Boss (Korean: 보스를 지켜라; RR: Boseureul jikyeora) is a 2011 South Korean workplace romantic comedy television series starring Choi Kang-hee, Ji Sung, Kim Jae-joong, Wang Ji-hye, and Park Yeong-gyu. It aired on SBS from August 3 to September 29, 2011 on Wednesdays and Thursdays at 21:55.

== Plot ==
Cha Ji-heon (Ji Sung) is an incredibly immature young man who is useless at his job as a director at DN Group, where the chairman is his father (Park Yeong-gyu). Ji-heon has a longstanding rivalry in work and love with cousin Cha Mu-won (Kim Jae-joong), as Mu-won is a mature, hardworking, and seemingly perfect executive, and the two both have a romantic history with Seo Na-yoon (Wang Ji-hye). Spunky and tough Noh Eun-seol (Choi Kang-hee) is struggling to find full-time work because of her juvenile delinquent record and poor academic background. After giving the hiring directors a piece of her mind during a job interview at DN Group, she is surprised to find herself hired by Mu-won (who was captivated by her interview) to be the secretary to Ji-heon. Determined not to be fired from her first professional job, Eun-seol works diligently at putting up with Ji-heon's childishness and keeping him in check. As their working relationship progresses, they earn each other's trust and friendship, and Eun-seol helps Ji-heon deal with his phobias and prove himself capable of becoming DN Group's successor. Things get more complicated when Ji-heon and Mu-won both fall for Eun-seol.

== Cast ==
=== Main ===
- Ji Sung as Cha Ji-heon: A spoiled heir of DN group, known to be immature and hold grudges. He quickly falls in love his secretary, Noh Eun-seol though the latter is initially confused and not accepting of his advances. They date then eventually get married after a series of comedic events at the end of the series.
- Choi Kang-hee as Noh Eun-seol: A hard working woman with a strong sense of right and wrong. She was torn between Cha Mu Won and Cha Ji Heon with her eventually dating and marrying Cha Ji-Heon and Mu won ending up with Seo Na Yoon. Eun-sol was rivals turned best friends with Seo Na-yoon.
- Kim Jae-joong as Cha Mu-won: The less spoiled heir and cousin of Cha Ji-Heon. He had conflicts with his mother regarding Seo Na-yoon whom he ends up with the latter his mother had an rivalry with Na-yoon's mother at the near end of his series. Known to be sarcastic and mysterious, he ends up greatly caring for Na-yoon as she is his first love with whom he loved when she was dating Cha Ji-Heon leading Na-yoon to be torn with Cha Mu Won and Cha Ji Heon though she ends up chasing Cha Mu Won when he seems to be attracted to Noh Eun Seol. Cha Mu won quickly develops an attraction to Noh Eun sol after Seo Na yoon rejects him due to her not wanting to make the same mistake once again. He ends up with Seo Na Yoon whom he had always loved. At the end of the series, both Mu won and Na yoon remain unmarried. Though he has proposed to her and Na yoon wants to get married, he thinks she should "grow up" a bit more.
- Wang Ji-hye as Seo Na-Yoon: Ji-heon's previous girlfriend and Mu won's first love. Initially seeming like a spoiled rich brat, Na-Yoon is eventually revealed to care deeply and stand by the people she gets close to. She is seen to cry and be emotional with Cha Mu Won the only person who she actually truly cry around and depend on, whom she ends up with. She deeply loved and cared about both Cha Ji Heon and Cha Mu Won though she is both their ex girlfriend and due to her mistake which is not revealed in the series ends up leaving Cha Ji Heon she comes to back win over Cha Ji Heon but due to Cha Ji Heon being interested in Noh Eun Sol, she realizes her attraction and love towards Cha Mu Won who both have issues due to the treatment of both of their mothers, she ends up trying to win over Cha Mu Won in which she does win in after rejecting him. She is known to be playful when becoming friends with Noh Eun Seol in the series with whom she was originally not on exemplary terms with, she ends up moving in with Eun Seol when she becomes friends with her. In the end, she wants to marry Cha Mu Won but he thinks she needs to "grow up" a bit more. She has also been described as adorable and is weirdly loveable.

=== Supporting ===
- Park Yeong-gyu as Chairman Cha Bong-man, Ji-heon's father
- Cha Hwa-yeon as Shin Sook-hee, Mu-won's mother
- Kim Young-ok as Mrs. Song, Ji-heon and Mu-won's grandmother
- Ha Jae-sook as Lee Myung-ran, Eun-seol's best friend
- Jung Kyu-soo as Noh Bong-man, Eun-seol's father
- Kim Hyung-bum as Secretary Kim, Ji-heon's secretary
- Kim Ha-kyoon as Secretary Jang, Chairman Cha's secretary
- Kim Chung as Hwang Kwan-jang, Na-yoon's mother
- Kim Seung-wook as Park Sang-mu
- Lee Hee-won as Yang Ha-young, Mu-won's secretary

=== Special appearance ===
- Oh Hee-joon as Office worker
- Ahn Nae-sang as loan shark (ep. 1)
- Yoon Gi-won as Na-yoon's blind date (ep. 17)
- Oh Hyun-kyung as Secretary Jang's blind date (ep. 18)

== Ratings ==
Episode #	Original broadcast date	Average audience share			
Episode #	Original broadcast date	TNmS Ratings		AGB Nielsen	
Episode #	Original broadcast date	Nationwide	Seoul National Capital Area	Nationwide	Seoul National Capital Area
1	3 August 2011	12.1%	14.5%	12.6%	14.5%
2	4 August 2011	13.4%	16.3%	14.7%	17.8%
3	10 August 2011	15.3%	18.3%	15.5%	17.8%
4	11 August 2011	15.3%	17.6%	16.4%	18.7%
5	17 August 2011	15.7%	19.2%	17.8%	20.5%
6	18 August 2011	16.1%	19.0%	17.8%	20.4%
7	24 August 2011	14.0%	17.8%	16.3%	18.5%
8	25 August 2011	15.6%	18.7%	16.5%	19.0%
9	31 August 2011	14.0%	17.2%	16.0%	18.3%
10	1 September 2011	14.5%	17.5%	15.4%	17.2%
11	7 September 2011	13.2%	15.5%	15.3%	17.4%
12	8 September 2011	13.4%	16.2%	14.8%	16.6%
13	14 September 2011	13.9%	18.1%	13.2%	15.4%
14	15 September 2011	13.3%	15.8%	14.0%	15.3%
15	21 September 2011	13.5%	16.9%	14.5%	16.6%
16	22 September 2011	12.9%	15.4%	14.1%	16.4%
17	28 September 2011	14.1%	17.1%	12.9%	15.5%
18	29 September 2011	14.6%	18.1%	14.2%	16.6%
Average		14.1%	17.2%	15.1%	17.4%

== Soundtrack ==
Track listing

1. "우리 그냥 사랑하게 해주세요" (Please let us love) – Apink
2. "잘 알지도 못하면서" – Lyn
3. "지켜줄게" (I'll protect you) – Kim Jaejoong
4. "묻는다 – 엠스트리트" - M. Street
5. "그대만 보여요" (I can only see you) – Yewon of Jewelry and Hwang Kwanghee of ZE:A
6. "슬픈 노래는" (Sad song) – Heo Young-saeng
7. "너 때문에" – Hyu Woo
8. "이제야 알겠어" (Now we know why) – Son Hyun-woo
9. "우리 그냥 사랑하게 해주세요" (instrumental)
10. "잘 알지도 못하면서" (instrumental)
11. "지켜줄게" (instrumental)
12. "묻는다" (instrumental)
13. "그대만 보여요" (instrumental)
14. "슬픈 노래는" (instrumental)
15. "너 때문에" (instrumental)
16. "이제야 알겠어" (instrumental)

== Awards ==
2011 SBS Drama Awards

- Top Excellence Award, Actor in a Drama Special - Ji Sung
- Top Excellence Award, Actress in a Drama Special - Choi Kang-hee
- Best Supporting Actor in a Drama Special - Park Yeong-gyu
- Top 10 Stars - Ji Sung, Choi Kang-hee
- New Star Award - Kim Jaejoong, Wang Ji-hye
- Netizen Popularity Award, Actress - Choi Kang-hee
- Best Couple Award - Ji Sung and Choi Kang-hee
- Achievement Award - Kim Young-ok

== International broadcast ==
- The series was popular in Japan and aired on multiple channels, including: paid satellite channels KNTV, DATV, KBS Japan, BS Japan TV, and major broadcaster TBS.
- The series airs every weeknights at 7:15pm in the Philippines via Jeepney TV under its "Asian Express" block.
- The series previously played in 8TV (Malaysia) in Malaysia.
- It aired in Vietnam on HTV3 from January 15, 2014.
- It aired in Thailand on PPTV beginning November 18, 2014.

== Remake ==
In 2012, the TV channel "Ukraine" filmed jointly Russian-Ukrainian license remake with the same name but adapted, with the same soundtrack. The quality rating of Kinopoisk is 7,742 of 10. Popularity Rating is 6,847% with the original rating 7,731 of 10
