= 4 Legendary Witches =

2014 South Korean TV drama

- Promotional poster
- Also known as: Legendary Witches; The Legendary Witches; The Legendary Witch; Witches of Legend; Legend of the Witch; The Witches Coven; Legendary Women
- Hangul: 전설의 마녀
- Hanja: 傳說의 魔女
- RR: Jeonseorui manyeo
- MR: Chŏnsŏrŭi manyŏ
- Genre: Romance; Revenge; Family
- Written by: Gu Hyun-sook
- Directed by: Joo Sung-woo
- Starring: Han Ji-hye; Ha Seok-jin; Go Doo-shim; Oh Hyun-kyung; Ha Yeon-soo
- Country of origin: South Korea
- Original language: Korean
- No. of episodes: 40

Production
- Executive producer: Kim Kyung-hee
- Production company: Pan Entertainment

Original release
- Network: MBC TV
- Release: October 25, 2014 – March 8, 2015

4 Legendary Witches (Korean: 전설의 마녀) is a 2014 South Korean television series starring Han Ji-hye, Ha Seok-jin, Go Doo-shim, Oh Hyun-kyung and Ha Yeon-soo. It aired on MBC from October 25, 2014, to March 8, 2015, on Saturdays and Sundays at 21:45 (KST) for 40 episodes. It reached a peak viewership rating of 31.4% on its 29th episode.

== Synopsis ==
Orphan Moon Soo-in marries Ma Do-hyun, the eldest son of the chaebol family who owns bakery corporation Shinhwa Group. But when Do-hyun dies unexpectedly, the Ma family makes Soo-in take the fall for their illegal business practices and she ends up in jail for stock manipulation that she did not commit. At Cheongju's Penitentiary for Women, her cellmates are kind-hearted and consists of Shim Bok-nyeo who was falsely accused of killing her husband and son; tough-as-nails, foul-mouthed Son Poong-geum who was convicted of fraud, and former model Seo Mi-oh who's been charged with the attempted murder of her boyfriend, Shinhwa Group's youngest son.

The four women bond and become friends, particularly when they join the baking classes being taught by Nam Woo-suk, a hotel chef. Woo-suk is a widower who is raising his daughter alone after the death of his wife six years ago. At his father-in-law's suggestion, he became a volunteer at the local prison's vocational training center, where he meets Soo-in and begins to fall for her.

Upon their discharge, the four women put the baking skills they learned in prison to use, opening up a bakery together. But they face stiff competition from the Shinhwa Group.

== Cast ==
=== Main ===
- Han Ji-hye as Moon Soo-in
- Ha Seok-jin as Nam Woo-seok
- Go Doo-shim as Shim Bok-nyeo
- Oh Hyun-kyung as Son Poong-geum
- Ha Yeon-soo as Seo Mi-oh

=== Supporting ===
==== The Ma Family ====
- Park Geun-hyung as Ma Tae-san
  - Shim Hyung-tak as young Tae-san
- Jung Hye-sun as Bok Dan-shim
- Jeon In-hwa as Cha Aeng-ran
  - Ha Eun-jin as young Aeng-Ran
- Byun Jung-soo as Ma Joo-ran
- Lee Seung-joon as Park Won-jae
- Kim Yoon-seo as Ma Joo-hee
- Do Sang-woo as Ma Do-jin
- Go Joo-won as Ma Do-hyun (cameo)

==== Seochon Residence Family ====
- Park In-hwan as Park Yi-moon
- Lee Jong-won as Tak Wol-han
- Lee Sook as Bae Chung-ja
- Lee Han-seo as Nam Byeol
- Kim Soo-mi as Kim Young-wok

=== Extended ===
- Hong Ah-reum as Eun Bo-kyung
- Lee Seung-hyeong as Director Wang
- Kwon Seong-deok as Kim Deok-Gu
- Kim Jung-dyoon as Lee Gang-Choon
- Yum Dong-hun as Oh Man-Bok
- Park Ah-sung as Mr. Kim
- Kim Hee-jung as Top Safety CEO

== Ratings ==
Ep.	Original broadcast date	Average audience share			
Ep.	Original broadcast date	TNmS		AGB Nielsen	
Ep.	Original broadcast date	Nationwide	Seoul	Nationwide	Seoul
1	October 25, 2014	13.4%	16.0%	14.5% (2nd)	16.6% (2nd)
2	October 26, 2014	12.6%	16.1%	13.8% (4th)	16.2% (4th)
3	November 1, 2014	13.6%	16.2%	14.0% (2nd)	15.2% (2nd)
4	November 2, 2014	13.5%	17.5%	15.7% (3rd)	16.7% (2nd)
5	November 8, 2014	14.6%	17.4%	16.5% (2nd)	17.7% (2nd)
6	November 9, 2014	15.8%	20.3%	17.5% (2nd)	18.3% (2nd)
7	November 15, 2014	16.4%	19.6%	19.1% (2nd)	19.8% (2nd)
8	November 16, 2014	16.9%	21.2%	20.8% (2nd)	22.5% (2nd)
9	November 22, 2014	17.7%	21.5%	21.3% (2nd)	23.2% (2nd)
10	November 23, 2014	18.2%	22.8%	22.0% (2nd)	24.6% (2nd)
11	November 29, 2014	19.3%	23.2%	20.8% (2nd)	21.8% (2nd)
12	November 30, 2014	19.9%	23.5%	23.0% (2nd)	24.7% (2nd)
13	December 6, 2014	19.4%	23.4%	21.0% (2nd)	22.8% (2nd)
14	December 7, 2014	19.6%	24.2%	23.3% (2nd)	25.2% (2nd)
15	December 13, 2014	19.3%	23.9%	22.4% (2nd)	23.8% (2nd)
16	December 14, 2014	21.7%	26.1%	24.1% (2nd)	25.9% (2nd)
17	December 20, 2014	24.2%	28.2%	25.1% (2nd)	26.6% (2nd)
18	December 21, 2014	23.3%	28.3%	25.6% (2nd)	28.0% (2nd)
19	December 27, 2014	20.9%	24.6%	25.0% (2nd)	27.2% (2nd)
20	December 28, 2014	22.4%	26.8%	26.1% (2nd)	28.1% (2nd)
21	January 3, 2015	24.6%	29.7%	27.2% (2nd)	30.0% (2nd)
22	January 4, 2015	24.2%	29.9%	26.6% (2nd)	28.8% (2nd)
23	January 10, 2015	25.2%	30.2%	25.9% (2nd)	27.0% (2nd)
24	January 11, 2015	24.6%	30.7%	27.0% (2nd)	29.5% (2nd)
25	January 17, 2015	26.1%	30.8%	28.0% (2nd)	30.9% (2nd)
26	January 18, 2015	25.8%	32.2%	27.8% (2nd)	31.2% (2nd)
27	January 24, 2015	28.0%	35.6%	30.3% (2nd)	32.2% (2nd)
28	January 25, 2015	28.0%	34.1%	30.9% (2nd)	34.0% (2nd)
29	January 31, 2015	27.5%	32.2%	31.4% (1st)	34.2% (1st)
30	February 1, 2015	28.0%	34.4%	31.4% (2nd)	33.8% (2nd)
31	February 7, 2015	28.0%	33.6%	28.2% (2nd)	30.3% (2nd)
32	February 8, 2015	27.4%	32.6%	30.2% (2nd)	32.5% (2nd)
33	February 14, 2015	26.7%	31.3%	27.9% (2nd)	29.6% (2nd)
34	February 15, 2015	26.2%	32.6%	28.5% (2nd)	30.4% (2nd)
35	February 21, 2015	25.9%	29.6%	28.3% (1st)	29.9% (1st)
36	February 22, 2015	27.5%	32.4%	29.5% (1st)	31.5% (1st)
37	February 28, 2015	26.3%	30.9%	28.7% (1st)	31.2% (1st)
38	March 1, 2015	26.6%	31.0%	28.2% (1st)	30.5% (1st)
39	March 7, 2015	26.8%	32.3%	28.8% (1st)	31.1% (1st)
40	March 8, 2015	29.0%	34.4%	30.1% (1st)	31.8% (1st)
Average		22.4%	27.0%	24.7%	26.6%
In this table, the blue numbers represent the lowest ratings and the red numbers represent the highest ratings.

== Awards and nominations ==
Year	Award	Category	Recipient	Result
2014	33rd MBC Drama Awards	Top Excellence Award, Actress in a Special Project Drama	Han Ji-hye	Nominated
2014	33rd MBC Drama Awards	Excellence Award, Actor in a Special Project Drama	Ha Seok-jin	Nominated
2014	33rd MBC Drama Awards	Excellence Award, Actress in a Special Project Drama	Oh Hyun-kyung	Nominated
2014	33rd MBC Drama Awards	Golden Acting Award, Actress	Go Doo-shim	Nominated
2014	33rd MBC Drama Awards	Golden Acting Award, Actress	Jung Hye-sun	Nominated
2015	4th APAN Star Awards	Top Excellence Award, Actress in a Serial Drama	Han Ji-hye	Nominated
2015	4th APAN Star Awards	Excellence Award, Actor in a Serial Drama	Ha Seok-jin	Nominated
2015	34th MBC Drama Awards	Grand Prize (Daesang)	Jeon In-hwa	Nominated
2015	34th MBC Drama Awards	Drama of the Year	4 Legendary Witches	Nominated
2015	34th MBC Drama Awards	Top Excellence Award, Actress in a Special Project Drama	Jeon In-hwa	Won
2015	34th MBC Drama Awards	Excellence Award, Actress in a Special Project Drama	Oh Hyun-kyung	Won
2015	34th MBC Drama Awards	Best Supporting Actress in a Special Project Drama	Kim Soo-mi	Won
2015	34th MBC Drama Awards	Best New Actress in a Special Project Drama	Ha Yeon-soo	Nominated

== International broadcast ==
- It aired in Vietnam on HTV2 beginning September 22, 2015, under the title Người vợ dũng cảm.
