= My Love By My Side =

2011 South Korean television series

- Promotional poster
- Also known as: My Love Beside Me
- Hangul: 내사랑 내곁에
- RR: Naesarang naegyeote
- MR: Naesarang naegyŏt'e
- Genre: Romance; Family; Drama
- Written by: Kim Sa-kyung
- Directed by: Han Jung-hwan
- Starring: Lee So-yeon; Lee Jae-yoon; On Joo-wan
- Country of origin: South Korea
- Original language: Korean
- No. of episodes: 50

Production
- Producer: Kim Jung-min
- Production location: Korea
- Running time: Saturdays and Sundays at 20:50 (KST)

Original release
- Network: SBS TV
- Release: May 7 – October 23, 2011

My Love By My Side (Korean: 내사랑 내곁에; RR: Naesarang naegyeote) is a 2011 South Korean television series starring Lee So-yeon, Lee Jae-yoon and On Joo-wan. It aired on SBS from May 7 to October 23, 2011 on Saturdays and Sundays at 20:50 for 50 episodes.

== Plot ==
Do Mi-sol is a single mother who gave birth when she was a teenager and raised her son alone after her boyfriend dumped her. Years later, she falls in love with a kind-hearted man.

== Cast ==
- Lee So-yeon as Do Mi-sol
- Lee Jae-yoon as Lee So-ryong
- On Joo-wan as Go Seok-bin
- Kim Mi-sook as Bong Sun-ah
- Moon Cheon-shik as Kim Woo-dong
- Kim Mi-kyung as Choi Eun-hee
- Kim Myung-gook as Lee Man-soo
- Sa Mi-ja as Sarah Jung
- Jeon Hye-bin as Jo Yoon-jung
- Lee Hwi-hyang as Bae Jung-ja
- Kim Il-woo as Go Jin-taek
- Moon Ji-in as Go Soo-bin
- Choi Jae-sung as Go Jin-gook
- Jung Hye-sun as Mrs. Kang
- Lee Eui-jung as Lee Joo-ri
- Oh Chi-woong as Director Kang
- Park Jung-woo as John Cook
- Ryan as Jason
- Kim Tae-joon
- Lee Tae-woo as Bong Young-woong
- Yoon Yi-na

== Awards and nominations ==
Year	Award	Category	Recipient	Result
2011	19th SBS Drama Awards	Top Excellence Award, Actress in a Weekend/Daily Drama	Lee Hwi-hyang	Nominated
2011	19th SBS Drama Awards	Excellence Award, Actor in a Weekend/Daily Drama	Lee Jae-yoon	Nominated
2011	19th SBS Drama Awards	Excellence Award, Actress in a Weekend/Daily Drama	Lee So-yeon	Won
2011	19th SBS Drama Awards	Special Acting Award, Actress in a Weekend/Daily Drama	Kim Mi-sook	Nominated
2011	19th SBS Drama Awards	New Star Award	Lee Jae-yoon	Won

== International broadcast ==
- It aired in Vietnam from June 6, 2014 on VTV3 under the title Hãy sống bên anh.
