= Design and Arts Arcadia of Myungseung =

- Founded: 2004
- Founder: Soon Jo Lee, CEO
- Headquarters: Seoul, Korea
- Parent: MAC Architects-Consultants Group Ltd.
- Website: DAAM.ac

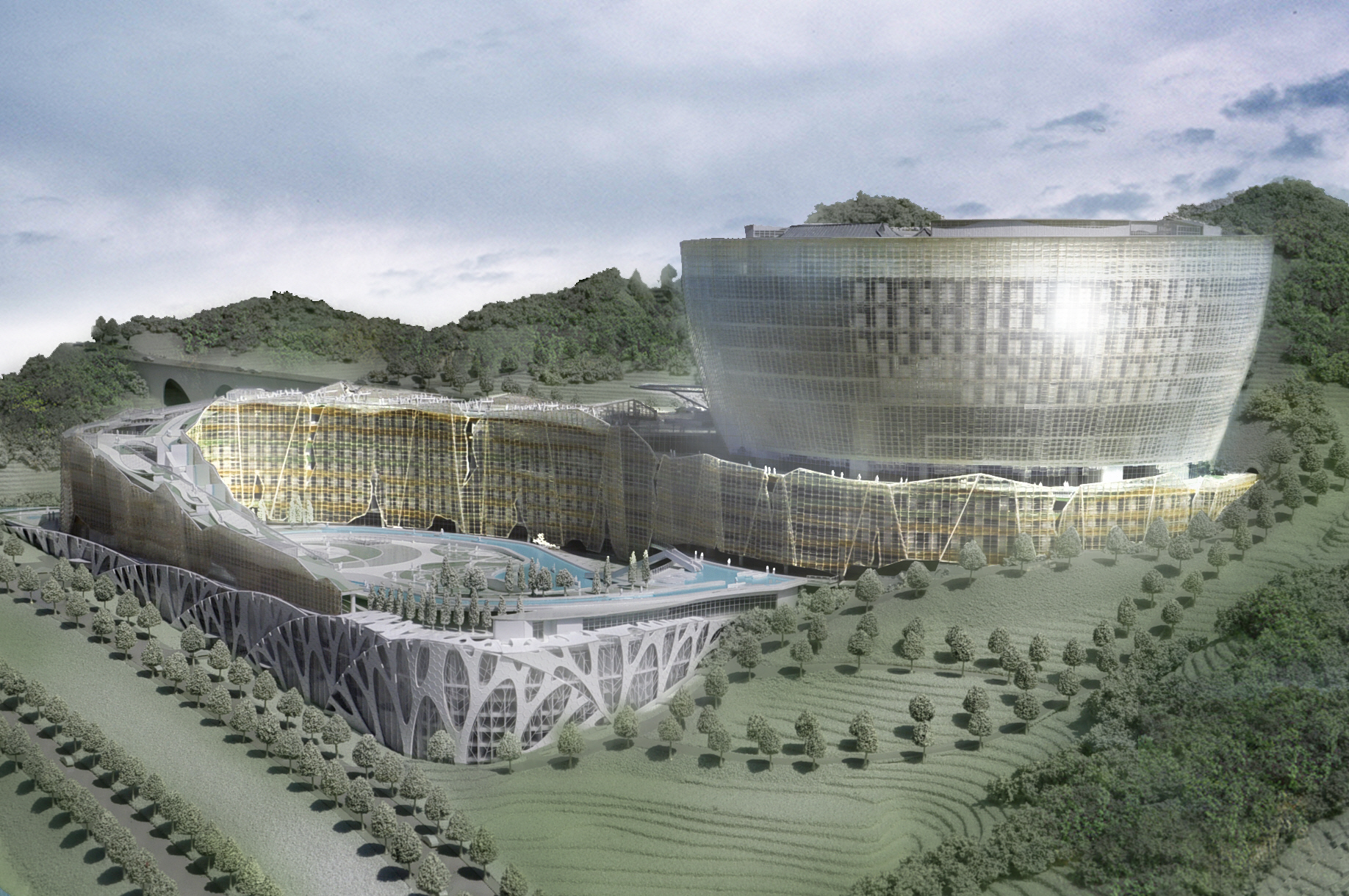
Design and Arts Arcadia of Myungseung

Design and Arts Arcadia of Myungseung (abbreviated DAAM), located in Chuncheon, Korea, is a full-service hotel with local art and culture as the focal theme of its operations. First conceptualized in 2004 by the CEO of MAC Architects-Consultants Group Ltd., Mr. Soon Jo Lee, DAAM is currently undergoing construction after having its groundbreaking ceremony on December 21, 2009 and having received its architectural permit on June 23, 2010. The Grand Opening of DAAM is projected to be in 2013.

== Concept of the apple ==
Apples have long been a theme used to depict ambition as well as innovation. Examples of this could be seen many times throughout history, such as the forbidden apple from The Garden of Eden, the apple from Snow White, Newton's discovery of gravity through the falling apple, the Swiss folk story of Wilhelm Tell and the apple placed on his son's head and even New York City, often dubbed the Big Apple. Following the long traditions of apples being used as a symbol for such historical advances, the theme of the building will be based on the theme of an apple as well. The building will feature two main sections: the apple core and the apple peel with each part having a different purpose.

== Building facilities ==
DAAM will cover roughly 2.5 million square feet (~235,000 m^{2}), with 7 above-ground floors on both the apple core part and the apple peel part respectively. It will contain 7 underground floors to be used as parking facilities as well as storage facilities. The other building facilities are:

- 1,100 luxury hotel suites
- 500 atelier units
- 100 gallery and museum units
- 2,500 seating capacity concert hall
- 350 dormitory units
- 18 restaurants
- 1,000 seating capacity cafeteria
- Library
- 380 residential studio units
- 33,000 m^{2} of public area
- 6,000 m^{2} of sports facilities
- 3,600 m^{2} of spa facilities
- 300m canoe slalom stadium
- 1,650 m^{2} canoe polo stadium

== Neo-Bauhausian movement ==
The Bauhaus of the early 1900s was a school in Germany that combined crafts and the fine arts, and was famous for the approach to design that it publicized and taught. By incorporating art and music classes, along with seminars and lectures given by professionals and professors in their respective industry, DAAM has ambitions of creating a neo-Bauhausian movement. The furthering of the fine arts and the performing arts is to increase the awareness and participation among people of different ages and backgrounds. There are hopes to have international artists come to DAAM to work on their craft while having the capacity for also displaying their works and even having their works put up for sale.

== References in popular culture ==
In the Korean drama Personal Taste featured on MBC starring Son Ye-jin and Lee Min-ho, the Design and Arts Arcadia of Myungseung was the focal point of the plot, while being enveloped in the comedic love story that took place between the leading characters. Powered by MAC Architects-Consultants Group Ltd., DAAM, while being a part of the drama itself, also acted as the primary sponsor for the drama.

== Awards and notable recognition ==
- On April 23, 2010, DAAM received the honor of the Architectural Design of the Year Award from the Architectural Institute of Korea.
- On October 15, 2010, the Ministry of Culture, Sports and Tourism (South Korea) of the Republic of Korea awarded DAAM with a government funding of 15 billion Korean Won (approximately US$13 million), with the belief that DAAM will be an essential source of tourism as well as improving and spreading culture.
- On October 20, 2010, Chairman Mr. Soon Jo Lee was awarded the Architect of the Year Award from the Ministry of Land, Transport and Maritime Affairs on October 20, 2010.
