= The Suspicious Housekeeper =

- Promotional poster
- Also known as: The Mysterious Housekeeper; The Mystery Housemaid; The Strange Housekeeper
- Genre: Family drama Black comedy
- Based on: Kaseifu no Mita by Kazuhiko Yukawa
- Written by: Baek Woon-chul
- Directed by: Kim Hyung-shik
- Starring: Choi Ji-woo; Lee Sung-jae; Wang Ji-hye
- Country of origin: South Korea
- Original language: Korean
- No. of episodes: 20

Production
- Executive producer: Lee Hyun Jik SBS
- Producers: Kim Jin Geun, Lee Sang Min , Seo Joo Wan
- Production location: Korea
- Production company: Everyshow

Original release
- Network: SBS TV
- Release: 23 September – 26 November 2013

Related
- Kaseifu no Mita

The Suspicious Housekeeper (Korean: 수상한 가정부; RR: Susanghan gajeongbu) is a 2013 South Korean television series starring Choi Ji-woo, Lee Sung-jae, and Wang Ji-hye. It aired on SBS TV from 23 September to 26 November 2013 on Mondays and Tuesdays at 21:55 for 20 episodes.

It is a remake of Kaseifu no Mita (家政婦のミタ; "I am Mita, Your Housekeeper"), a hit Japanese drama that aired on NTV in 2011.

== Cast ==
- Choi Ji-woo as Park Bok-nyeo
- Lee Sung-jae as Eun Sang-chul
- Wang Ji-hye as Yoon Song-hwa
- Kim So-hyun as Eun Han-kyul, the eldest daughter
- Chae Sang-woo as Eun Doo-kyul, the second son
- Nam Da-reum as Eun Se-kyul, the third eldest son
- Kang Ji-woo as Eun Hye-kyul, the youngest daughter
- Park Geun-hyung as Woo Geum-chi, Sang-chul's father-in-law
- Shim Yi-young as Woo Na-young, Sang-chul's sister-in-law
- Cho Yeon-woo as Manager Choi
- Jang Seo-won as Lee Dong-shik
- Baek Seung-hyeon as Manager Kim
- Kim Hae-sook as Housekeeping Agency director Hong
- Jung Suk-yong as Shin Jung-man
- Ra Mi-ran as Yang Mi-ja
- Jung Moon-sung as Lee Tae-shik
- Hwang Jae-won as Oh Eo-jin, Hye-kyul's friend in kindergarten
- Bang Eun-hee as Eo-jin's mother
- Lee Seung-hyung as Oh Nam-jae, Eo-jin's father
- Seo Kang-joon as Choi Soo-hyuk
- Park Ji-bin as Shin Woo-jae
- Song Jong-ho as Jang Do-hyung/Seo Ji-hoon (cameo)
- Lee Yang-hee as Soo-hyuk's father (cameo)
- Kim Kwang-kyu as Han-kyul's homeroom teacher
- Im Ji-kyu as Se-kyul's homeroom teacher
- Son Sung-joon as perpetrator of bullying
- Kang Yi-seok as Jang-tae, The Boy who attacks Eun Se-kyul
- Jeon Ye-seo as Writer Kwon (cameo)
- Kim Ji-sook as Bo-nyeo's mother-in-law, Go Min-gook's mother (cameo)
- Kwak Do-won as Go Min-gook, Bok-nyeo's late husband (cameo)
- Kim Hee-jung as Woo Sun-young, Eun Sang-chul's late wife (cameo)

== Plot ==
Park Bok-nyeo is a mysterious housekeeper who will do whatever is asked of her, even, so the rumor goes, if that means murder. Her latest stint involves caring for a recently widowed father, and his four troubled children, all of whom are grappling with the aftermath of their mother's sudden death. The stoic new arrival, who shows barely any trace of emotion, acts as a catalyst for the family members to understand each other better and reconcile their relationships.

Episode Synopsis
Episode	Summary
1	Father Sang-chul employs a housekeeper when his wife died. And an employment agency manager gives him a warning that he should be careful about Bok-nyeo who obeys everything she's told. Meanwhile, when Hye-kyul said that she wants to see her mom as a birthday gift, her aunt Na-young promises her she will show her, her mom...
2	Han-kyul found out that her mom committed suicide because of her father's adultery. She visits Song-hwa, the adulterous woman, and showed her mom's last will to her. Meanwhile, Sang-chul is displeased with Bok-nyeo and asks the employment agency manager to send them another housekeeper instead of Bok-nyeo...
3	Han-kyul shows her mom's will to her younger brothers and sister and said that she couldn't live with her father anymore. And she leaves the house and goes to her mother's parents' home. Meanwhile, to make her family reconciled, Hye-kyul asks Bok-nyeo to kidnap her...
4	The 4 children ask their father, Sang-chul, to leave the house. And they ask their father to allow Bok-nyeo to work again with the role of being their mom. Meanwhile, Bok-nyeo saw when Sang-chul meets with Song-hwa. Sang-chul tries to clear up the misunderstanding. However, Geum-chi, Sang-chul's father-in-law, who sees Bok-nyeo and Sang-chul together begins to question their relationship...
5	When Han-kyul goes to meet Sang-chul in his room to discuss Bok-nyeo, she sees Sang-chul's couple ring. She becomes enraged. Meanwhile, Doo-gyul looks up Bok-nyeo on the internet and stumbles upon obscene material by accident and this was discovered by Bok-nyeo...
6	Han-kyul makes up her mind to get revenge on Sang-chul. And Bok-nyeo says to her that the most fearful thing to parents is when their children become destroyed. Meanwhile, rumors begin to swirl about Han-kyul and her sexual relationship with others. Because of that, Han-kyul decides to run away from home...
7	Soo-hyuk has resolved Han-kyul's misunderstanding about having sexual relationships with others, and asked her to forgive his former mistakes. And Han-kyul said she will leave the band. Meanwhile, 4 children asked about Bok-nyeo's family and she said, she had killed her family...

== Ratings ==
Episode #	Original broadcast date	Average audience share			
Episode #	Original broadcast date	TNmS Ratings		AGB Nielsen	
Episode #	Original broadcast date	Nationwide	Seoul National Capital Area	Nationwide	Seoul National Capital Area
1	23 September 2013	7.4%	8.8%	8.9%	10.3%
2	24 September 2013	8.2%	9.3%	8.8%	9.7%
3	30 September 2013	8.3%	9.7%	9.9%	7.8%
4	1 October 2013	8.3%	8.9%	9.5%	9.8%
5	7 October 2013	8.1%	10.0%	7.0%	9.0%
6	8 October 2013	9.7%	8.3%	8.4%	9.3%
7	14 October 2013	9.5%	10.7%	10.6%	12.2%
8	15 October 2013	10.3%	12.6%	11.1%	12.0%
9	21 October 2013	9.8%	10.7%	10.7%	11.0%
10	22 October 2013	10.2%	11.9%	10.5%	12.4%
11	28 October 2013	9.1%	11.1%	9.3%	10.4%
12	29 October 2013	7.9%	8.3%	10.0%	9.0%
13	4 November 2013	9.2%	9.7%	9.8%	10.4%
14	5 November 2013	9.8%	10.8%	10.3%	11.7%
15	11 November 2013	9.9%	9.1%	9.6%	9.8%
16	12 November 2013	9.5%	9.8%	10.4%	10.6%
17	18 November 2013	8.7%	8.9%	9.5%	10.7%
18	19 November 2013	8.0%	9.3%	9.0%	10.2%
19	25 November 2013	8.0%	9.3%	10.0%	10.2%
20	26 November 2013	9.6%	10.5%	10.3%	11.9%
Average		8.0%	-	9.0%	10.2%

== Awards and nominations ==
Year	Award	Category	Recipient	Result
2013	21st SBS Drama Awards	Top Excellence Award, Actress in a Drama Special	Choi Ji-woo	Nominated
2013	21st SBS Drama Awards	Excellence Award, Actor in a Drama Special	Lee Sung-jae	Nominated
2013	21st SBS Drama Awards	Excellence Award, Actress in a Drama Special	Wang Ji-hye	Nominated
2013	21st SBS Drama Awards	New Star Award	Kim So-hyun	Won
2014	7th Korea Drama Awards	Top Excellence Award, Actress	Choi Ji-woo	Nominated

== Title controversy ==
On 6 September 2013, the Korean Women Workers Association and the National House Management Cooperative held a press conference in front of SBS and denounced the use of the word gajeongbu (which literally translates to "a house woman") in the title, saying it belittles housekeepers. They asked that the production change the title to gajeong-gwanlisa ("house manager"), while the National Institute of the Korean Language recommended using gasa-doumi ("housework helper"). An official from the network said that they are retaining the word gajeongbu because it is the Korean word equivalent for the Japanese source material's kaseifu. Instead, they compromised by refraining from using the controversial word in the script, and added a scene that explains what to call people who clean and cook at the homes of others, and what the appropriate title is for them.

== International broadcast ==
- It aired in Japan on cable channel KNTV from 23 September to 1 October 2014.
- It aired in Vietnam on VTC9 - Let's Viet from 13 February 2015, under the title Quản gia bí ẩn.
- It aired in Thailand on PPTV from 9 February to 14 April 2015.
