= Personal Taste =

2010 South Korean TV series

- Promotional poster
- Also known as: Personal Preference
- Hangul: 개인의 취향
- Hanja: 個人의 趣向
- Lit.: Personal Preference
- RR: Gaeinui chwihyang
- MR: Kaeinŭi ch'wihyang
- Genre: Romance; Comedy; Drama
- Based on: Personal Taste by Lee Se-in
- Written by: Kim Hee-ju
- Directed by: Son Hyung-suk; Noh Jong-chan
- Starring: Son Ye-jin; Lee Min-ho; Kim Ji-seok; Wang Ji-hye
- Opening theme: Can't Believe It (Younha)
- Country of origin: South Korea
- Original language: Korean
- No. of episodes: 16

Production
- Executive producer: Han Hee
- Producer: Cho Yoon-jung
- Production company: Victory Contents

Original release
- Network: Munhwa Broadcasting Corporation
- Release: March 31 – May 20, 2010

Personal Taste (Korean: 개인의 취향; lit. 'Kae-in's Preference'), also known as Personal Preference, is a 2010 South Korean television series, starring Son Ye-jin and Lee Min-ho. It is adapted from Lee Se-in's 2007 novel of the same name about a furniture designer, Park Kae-in, who lives together with architect Jeon Jin-ho under the mistaken assumption that he's gay. It aired on MBC from March 31 to May 20, 2010, on Wednesdays and Thursdays at 21:55 (KST) for 16 episodes.

== Synopsis ==
Furniture designer Park Kae-in (Son Ye-jin) is kind, impulsive, clumsy, and a complete slob in her personal habits. She lives in Sanggojae (meaning "a place for mutual love"), a modernized hanok (traditional Korean house) designed by her father, a famous and reclusive architecture professor (Kang Shin-il). As an independent furniture designer, she struggles to produce successful products and is constantly trying to impress her father with her works. Her long-time boyfriend, Han Chang-ryul (Kim Ji-seok), breaks up with her after cheating on her. Kae-in is an easygoing woman and a pushover. Despite being upset, Kae-in attends the wedding of her friend and roommate, serial monogamist Kim In-hee (Wang Ji-hye), only to discover that she is marrying Chang-ryul; and that the two had been seeing each other behind her back for a while. After she finally comes face-to-face with them, the wedding ceremony turns chaotic and is cancelled. Kae-in is heartbroken and determined to never take a chance on love again.

Meanwhile, to keep his small firm afloat, architect Jeon Jin-ho (Lee Min-ho) is desperately trying to win a project bid for the Dam Art Center against Future Construction, the company owned and operated by Chang-ryul's father (Ahn Suk-hwan). Chang-ryul's father was originally an employee under Jin-ho's father, who stole the latter's company. In order to win the project of Dam Arts Center, Jin-ho has to find a way to dig up more information about the tentative theme of project: Sanggojae, which has never been opened to the public.

Jin-ho decides to rent a part of Sanggojae to get access into the house while Kae-in rents the place to him believing that he is homosexual due to misunderstandings from their previous encounters. After knowing the reason behind his approval, Jin-ho decides to leave Sanggojae to avoid being misunderstood further but is stopped by his assistant, Noh Sang-jun, who convinces him otherwise by reminding him that their chance at revival of their sinking firm lies on their success in Dam Arts Center Project.

After starting to live together, Jin-ho tells Kae-in that she's miserable only because of herself and the lack of concreteness in her personality. He then encourages and helps her transform from an inveterate slob into a better version of herself, who is confident and strong-willed. Amidst the transformation and hidden truths, Kae-in and Jin-ho start developing feelings for each other which they constantly deny.

The DAC director, Choi Do-bin (Ryu Seung-ryong), impressed by Jin-ho's presentation, offers his support to him in the upcoming project. He also finds Kae-in's ideas creative and hires her to design a recreation centre for children. Do-bin, who is homosexual, later finds himself attracted to Jin-ho, which leaves Jin-ho in a tight spot.

What will happen when the man who's pretending to be gay and the woman who thinks he's gay develop feelings for each other?

== Cast ==
- Son Ye-jin as Park Kae-in

A clumsy, slobbish girl. She is an aspiring furniture designer, and daughter of the famous architect Park Chul-han. After being dumped by her ex-boyfriend, she decides not to open up to love once again easily.

- Lee Min-ho as Jeon Jin-ho

An architect who is earnestly trying to keep his small firm afloat in a fair manner. He moves into Sanggojae to study it for his next project. Neat and organized, he is unable to stand Kae-in's living habits, and tries to change her into a better version of herself.

- Kim Ji-seok as Han Chang-ryul

Jeon Jin-ho's rival, and Kae-in's ex-boyfriend. Although he initially left Kae-in for her friend In-hee, he later grows feelings for Kae-in.

- Wang Ji-hye as Kim In-hee

A greedy woman who has multiple boyfriends and treats them as dispensable. Despite being Kae-in's best friend and having lived together for ten years, she betrays her and dates Chang-ryul. Later, In-hee falls for Jin-ho and tries to steal him from Kae-in.

- Jo Eun-ji as Lee Young-sun

Kae-in's best friend

- Jung Sung-hwa as Noh Sang-jun

Jin-ho's assistant

- Ryu Seung-ryong as Choi Do-bin

Director of the DAAM project. He is homosexual and develops feelings for Jin-ho thinking he, too, is gay.

- Lim Seul-ong as Kim Tae-hoon

Jin-ho's employee. He has a crush on Hye-mi.

- Choi Eun-seo as Na Hye-mi

Jin-ho's childhood friend. She had a crush on Jin-ho since they were young.

- Park Hae-mi as Jeon Jang-mi

Jin-ho's mother

- Ahn Suk-hwan as Han Yoon-sub

Chang-ryul's father. He worked at Jin-ho's father's company in the past, but later betrayed him.

- Jang Won-young as Secretary Kim
- Kang Shin-il as Park Chul-han

Kae-in's father. A famous architect who designed Sanggojae for his wife and daughter.

=== Special appearances ===
- Bong Tae-gyu as Lee Won-ho (ep. 1-2)
- Jung Chan as Groom (ep. 1)
- Song Seon-mi as Bride (ep. 1)
- Julien Kang as Joe (ep. 7)
- Yoon Eun-hye as Yoon Eun-soo (ep. 8)
- Kim Nam-gil as man sitting in the café (ep. 11)
- Kim Jun-ho

== Architecture ==
One of the production's main sponsors was Design and Arts Arcadia of Myungseung, and the storyline contains many references to DAAM as the project that all the architectural firms are competing to design.

The hanok used in the drama series (called Sanggojae in the script) is actually Rakgojae, a traditional guest house in Bukchon Hanok Village, Gye-dong, Jongno District. Meaning "a place to enjoy tradition", Rakgojae was renovated by master carpenter Chung Young-jin. It offers a glimpse of the lifestyle of Joseon-era scholars by incorporating fine art, music, dance and poetry through colorful cultural programs such as a tea ceremony, ink-and-wash painting lessons, Korean musical instrument lessons and kimchi-making classes.

One of the locations frequented by the main characters is Kring art gallery, in Gangnam District, southern Seoul. The creative cultural space showcases a variety of arts ranging from architecture and fashion to installations and digital art. The unique facade of the building is itself a large-scale urban sculpture. Circles are a theme throughout the building, but the front wall is reminiscent of stereo speakers, hinting at the name of the building. "Kring" means "circle" in Dutch.

== Original soundtrack ==
Personal Taste OST

Soundtrack album by Various Artists
- Released: 2010
- Genre: Soundtrack
- Languages: Korean; English
- Labels: Loen Entertainment; Victory Contents

No.	Title	Artist	Length
1.	"Can't Believe It" (말도 안돼)	Younha	3:15
2.	"Dropping Rain" (빗물이 내려서)	KimTae-woo	3:46
3.	"My Heart is Moved" (가슴이 뭉클)	SeeYa	3:39
4.	"You Are My Wings" (그대라는 날개)	KimTae-woo	3:57
5.	"Making Love" (사랑 만들기)	4Minute	3:36
6.	"Like a Fool" (바보처럼)	2AM	3:23
7.	"왕벌의 비행"	Various Artists	1:22
8.	"Strange Feeling"	Various Artists	1:44
9.	"왕벌의 비행" (Piano ver.)	Various Artists	1:20
10.	"Like a Fool (Inst.)"	Various Artists	3:13
11.	"Making Love (Inst.)" (Guitar Ver.)	Various Artists	3:35
12.	"You Are My Wings (Inst.)"	Various Artists	3:53
13.	"My Heart is Moved (Inst.)"	Various Artists	3:37
14.	"Dropping Rain (Inst.)" (Violin Ver.)	Various Artists	3:45
15.	"Can't Believe It (Inst.)" (Piano Ver.)	Various Artists	3:12
Total length:			40:24

== Ratings ==
In the table below, the blue numbers represent the lowest ratings and the red numbers represent the highest ratings.

Ep.	Original broadcast date	Average audience share			
Ep.	Original broadcast date	Nielsen Korea		TNmS	
Ep.	Original broadcast date	Nationwide	Seoul	Nationwide	Seoul
1	March 31, 2010	12.5%	13.8%	12.7%	13.7%
2	April 1, 2010	12.5%	14.2%	11.4%	11.9%
3	April 7, 2010	11.5%	13.0%	12.9%	14.5%
4	April 8, 2010	10.9%	12.7%	12.8%	14.0%
5	April 14, 2010	11.8%	13.6%	13.0%	14.3%
6	April 15, 2010	11.1%	12.7%	12.2%	13.1%
7	April 21, 2010	11.6%	14.0%	13.6%	15.1%
8	April 22, 2010	11.9%	13.2%	13.0%	13.9%
9	April 28, 2010	13.1%	15.1%	14.2%	15.8%
10	April 29, 2010	12.1%	13.7%	13.9%	15.0%
11	May 5, 2010	12.6%	14.4%	16.2%	17.6%
12	May 6, 2010	12.3%	14.0%	14.3%	15.8%
13	May 12, 2010	10.9%	12.6%	12.1%	13.1%
14	May 13, 2010	10.2%	11.8%	13.2%	14.3%
15	May 19, 2010	10.7%	12.1%	12.4%	13.0%
16	May 20, 2010	11.1%	12.4%	14.3%	14.9%
Average		11.7%	13.3%	13.3%	14.4%

== Awards and nominations ==
Year	Award	Category	Recipient	Result
2010	MBC Drama Awards	Excellence Award, Actor	Lee Min-ho	Won
2010	MBC Drama Awards	Best New Actor	Im Seulong	Nominated
2010	MBC Drama Awards	Popularity Award	Lee Min-ho	Nominated
2010	MBC Drama Awards	Popularity Award	Son Ye-jin	Nominated
2010	MBC Drama Awards	Best Couple Award	Lee Min-ho and Son Ye-jin	Nominated
2010	GyaO! Awards (Japan)	Best / Most Shared Foreign Drama	Personal Taste	Won

== International broadcast ==
The series was a mid-level hit in South Korea. Overseas rights were sold to the Philippines, Japan, China, Taiwan, Singapore, Hong Kong, Indonesia, and Thailand.
