= The Secret Lovers =

- Promotional poster
- Also known as: A Man and a Woman
- Directed by: Kim Sang-ho
- Starring: Han Ji-hye; Kim Suk-hoon; Song Seon-mi; Kwon Oh-joong
- Country of origin: South Korea
- Original language: Korean
- No. of episodes: 20

Production
- Executive producer: Park Dong-ah
- Producer: Park Sung-soo
- Production company: Pan Entertainment

Original release
- Network: Munhwa Broadcasting Corporation
- Release: August 29 – November 1, 2005

The Secret Lovers (Korean: 비밀남녀; RR: Bimillamnyeo; lit. 'Secrets Between a Man and a Woman'), also known as A Man and a Woman, is a 2005 South Korean television series starring Han Ji-hye, Kim Suk-hoon, Song Seon-mi and Kwon Oh-joong. It aired on MBC from August 29 to November 1, 2005 on Mondays and Tuesdays at 21:55 for 20 episodes.

== Plot ==
Seo Young-ji is ashamed of her poor upbringing and works hard to better herself. She goes to see a plastic surgeon, hoping that by changing her appearance she will feel better about herself. The surgeon, Jung Ah-mi, asks her for a favor: Ah-mi's parents have set her up on a blind date with Kim Joon-woo, but she isn't interested and wants Young-ji to go in her place. Young-ji agrees, and she and Joon-woo hit it off. However, when Joon-woo discovers that Young-ji isn't Ah-mi, and in fact has a poor family to look after, he dumps her.

Before dating Joon-woo, Young-ji was also recently dumped by Choi Do-kyung, a poor, but ambitious social climber. Do-kyung will do anything to marry a rich woman, and he falls for Ah-mi. But although Ah-mi also wants to get married soon, she has her own secrets to hide.

== Cast ==
- Han Ji-hye as Seo Young-ji
- Kim Suk-hoon as Kim Joon-woo
- Song Seon-mi as Jung Ah-mi
- Kwon Oh-joong as Choi Do-kyung
- Joo Hyun as Seo Dal-goo
- Kim Dong-hyun as Seo Young-goo
- Hwang Bo-ra as Seo Young-min
- Lee Jung-gil as Kim Jung-suk
- Ahn Hae-sook as Ms. Song
- Hyun Young as Kim Joon-mi
- Ahn Jae-hwan as Lee Moon
- Lee Byung-jin as Lee Sung-wol
- Seo Yeon-joo as Yang Jae-soon
