= Kwon Oh-joong =

South Korean actor

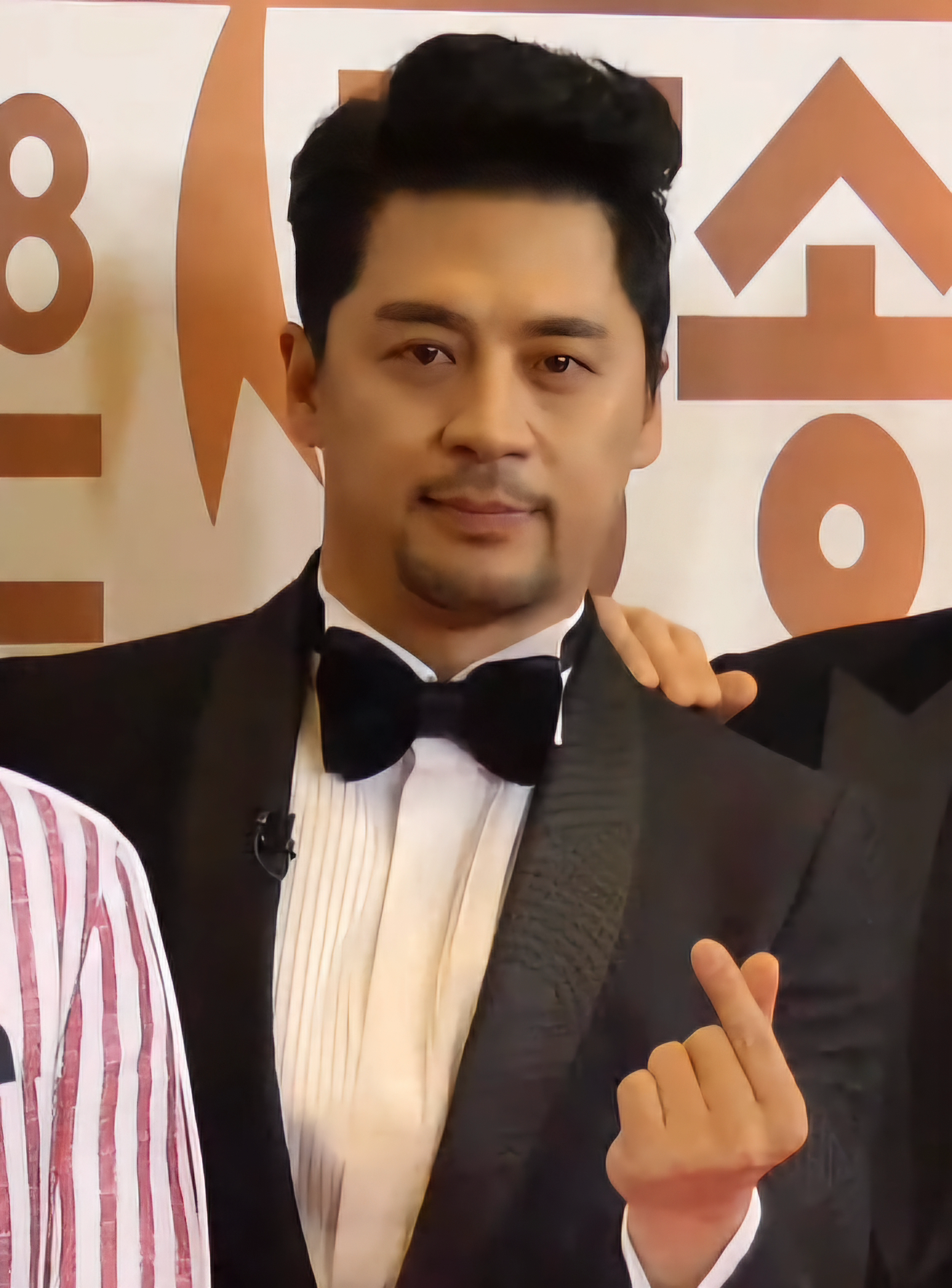
- Kwon in December 2018
- Born: November 24, 1971 (age 54); South Korea
- Education: Hongik University (Jochiwon) - Metallurgical Engineering; Seoul Cyber University - Social Welfare
- Occupation: Actor
- Years active: 1994–present
- Spouse: Uhm Yoon-kyung
- Children: 1

Korean name
- Hangul: 권오중
- RR: Gwon Ojung
- MR: Kwŏn Ojung
- Website: oozzoong.co.kr

Kwon Oh-joong (born November 24, 1971) is a South Korean actor. He is best known for starring in Gourmet (2008), as well as the television series The Secret Lovers (2005), Freedom Fighter, Lee Hoe-young (2010), and Miss Ajumma (2011). Kwon has also appeared in films such as To Catch a Virgin Ghost (2004) and Mr. Kim vs. Mr. Kim vs. Mr. Kim (also known as Master Kims, 2007).

Kwon is also certified as a level 2 social worker, and is known for his volunteer activities. He founded the organization 천사를 돕는 사람들의 모임 (A Group of Angels Who Help Others) in 2002.

== Filmography ==
=== Television series ===
- Bravo My Life (SBS, 2017)
- Five Enough (KBS2, 2016)
- Empress Ki (MBC, 2013)
- A Hundred Year Legacy (MBC, 2013)
- Arang and the Magistrate (MBC, 2012)
- Scent of a Woman (SBS, 2011) (cameo, ep 8)
- Miss Ajumma (SBS, 2011)
- The Duo (MBC, 2011)
- Freedom Fighter, Lee Hoe-young (KBS1, 2010)
- Life is Good (MBC, 2009)
- Gourmet (SBS, 2008)
- High Kick! (MBC, 2007) (cameo, ep 101)
- MBC Best Theater "Loveholic Project" (MBC, 2005)
- The Secret Lovers (MBC, 2005)
- Pingguari (SBS, 2005)
- Island Village Teacher (SBS, 2004)
- Match Made in Heaven (MBC, 2004)
- Damo (MBC, 2003)
- Hello! Balbari (KBS2, 2003)
- Why Can't We Stop Them (SBS, 2000–2002)
- Joa, Joa (SBS, 2000)
- Love Story "Insomnia, Manual and Orange Juice" (SBS, 2000)
- People's Houses (KBS1, 1999)
- Winners (SBS, 1998)
- I Love You, I'm Sorry (KBS2, 1998)
- Soonpoong Clinic (SBS, 1998–2000)
- Yesterday (MBC, 1997)
- The Angel Within (KBS2, 1997)
- MBC Best Theater "Subway Line 2 Platform" (MBC, 1997)
- TV City (MBC, 1995)
- Salut D'Amour (KBS2, 1994)

=== Film ===
- The Disciple John Oak (documentary, 2014) (narration)
- Kong's Family (2013)
- Addiction (documentary, 2013) (narration)
- The Forgotten Bag (2011)
- One Step Forward (2010) (cameo)
- His Last Gift (2008)
- Miss Gold Digger (2007)
- The Houseguest and My Mother (2007) (cameo)
- Bunt (2007)
- Mr. Kim vs. Mr. Kim vs. Mr. Kim (2007)
- Princess Aurora (2005)
- To Catch a Virgin Ghost (2004)
- Spring Bears Love (2003)
- Tube (2003)
- Reward (short film, 2003)
- If It Snows on Christmas (1998)
- The Young Man (1994)

=== Variety show ===
- Hope TV SBS (2022) - Host with children
- Law of the Jungle in Solomon Islands (2014)
- I Am a Man (2014)
- Nine to Six (2013)
- The Wife Doesn't Know (2013)
- Saturday Night Live Korea (2012-10-06)
- Finding Delicious TV (2012-05-05)
- Come to Play (2012)
- Korea's Talk Show Hello (2012)
- Movieholic (2011)
- Showdown! Star Chef (2009)
- 대결천하 (2001)

=== Music video appearances ===
한동근 (Han Dong-geun) 잘 헤어진 거야 ("Farewell") - January 22, 2020

== Cookbook author ==
- Good Eats: Healthy Meal Stories Told by a Dad (2010)

== Awards ==
- 2012 20th Korean Culture and Entertainment Awards: Best Supporting Actor (Arang and the Magistrate)
- 2012 Ministry of Health and Welfare commendation
- 2009 Ministry of Health and Welfare commendation
- 2006 Volunteer of the Year Award
- 2005 선행칭찬상 시상식 대중예술부문 선행상
- 1999 SBS Drama Awards: Popularity Award
