= Miss Ajumma =

2011 South Korean television series

- Genre: Melodrama; Romance; Family
- Written by: Song Jung-rim
- Directed by: Oh Jin-suk
- Starring: Oh Hyun-kyung; Kwon Oh-joong; Jung Shi-ah; Kim Jung-min; Jung Sung-woon
- Country of origin: South Korea
- Original language: Korean
- No. of episodes: 103

Production
- Producer: Oh Se-kang
- Production location: Korea
- Running time: Mondays to Fridays at 08:40 (KST)
- Production company: Hwa&Dam Pictures

Original release
- Network: Seoul Broadcasting System
- Release: 30 May – 21 October 2011

Miss Ajumma (Korean: 미쓰 아줌마) is a 2011 South Korean television series starring Oh Hyun-kyung, Kwon Oh-joong, Jung Shi-ah, Kim Jung-min and Jung Sung-woon. The morning soap opera aired on SBS on Mondays to Fridays at 8:40 a.m. from May 30, 2011 to October 21, 2011 for 103 episodes.

== Plot ==
Kang Geum-hwa (Oh Hyun-kyung) quit her job after getting married and having a daughter. Uncomplaining and trusting, she tries her best to make a happy home for her family. But when she learns that her husband Go Kyung-se (Kwon Oh-joong) is having an affair, she divorces him. Initially miserable, Geum-hwa undergoes a makeover. Now confident and attractive, she is ready to start a new life with her daughter.

Kyung-se, the president of advertising company Sweet Rain, remarries. Eventually, he comes to the realization of how important Geum-hwa is to him, and wants her back. But his new wife Wang Se-mi (Jung Shi-ah) isn't going to let him go without a fight.

== Cast ==
Main cast

- Oh Hyun-kyung as Kang Geum-hwa
- Kwon Oh-joong as Go Kyung-se
- Jung Shi-ah as Wang Se-mi
- Kim Jung-min as Yoon Jung-woo
- Jung Sung-woon as Wang Bong-soo

Supporting cast

- Kim Hyung-ja as Kwon Hee-ja
- Yeom Dong-heon as Kang Ho-shik
- Yu Ji-in as Lee Mi-ok
- Lee Da-jin as Kang Eun-hwa
- Oh Na-ra as Kim Hyun-sook
- Kim Jong-seok as Hwang Jong-goo
- In Gyo-jin (Note: Credited as Do Yi-sung.) as Lee Byung-chul
- Jang Mi-ja as Byung-chul's mother
- Min Joon-hyun as Kyung-se's friend
- Park Ran as Yeo Woo-kyung

== International broadcast ==
- It aired in Vietnam on HTV2 from September 26, 2015, under the title Tạm biệt hôn nhân.
