= Oh Hyun-kyung =

South Korean actress (born 1970)

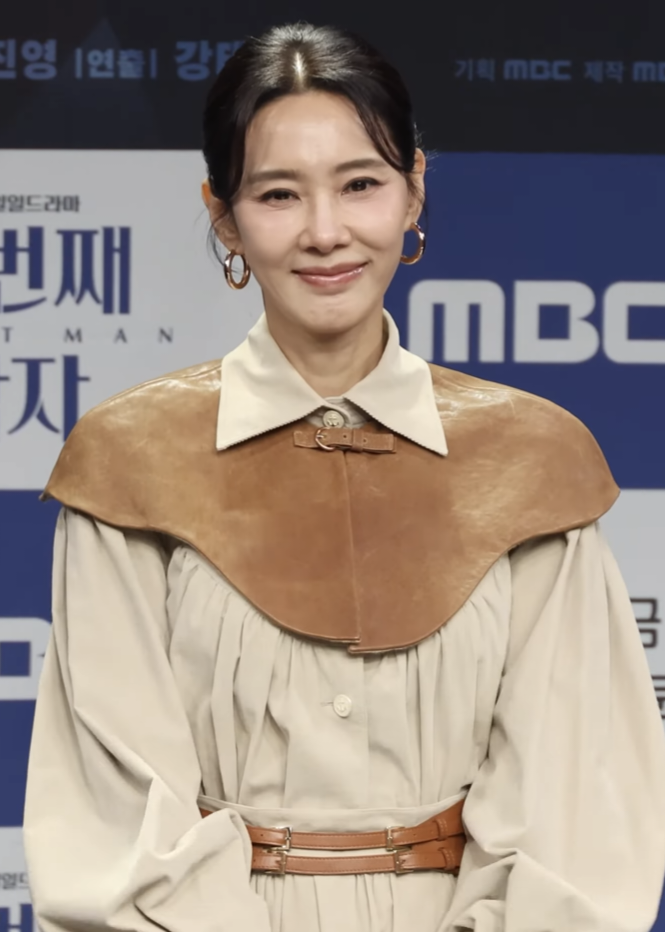
- Oh in December 2025
- Born: Oh Sang-ji; March 25, 1970 (age 56); South Korea
- Education: Dankook University – Theater and Film; Chung-Ang University Graduate School – Theater and Film
- Occupation: Actress
- Years active: 1988–present
- Agents: Studio Santa Claus Entertainment; (formerly Huayi Brothers Korea)
- Spouse: Hong Seung-pyo (m. 2002; div. 2006)
- Children: 1

Korean name
- Hangul: 오현경
- Hanja: 吳賢慶
- RR: O Hyeongyeong
- MR: O Hyŏn'gyŏng

Former name
- Hangul: 오상지
- RR: O Sangji
- MR: O Sangji

Oh Hyun-kyung (Korean: 오현경; born March 25, 1970), birth name Oh Sang-ji, is a South Korean actress and beauty pageant titleholder.

== Career ==
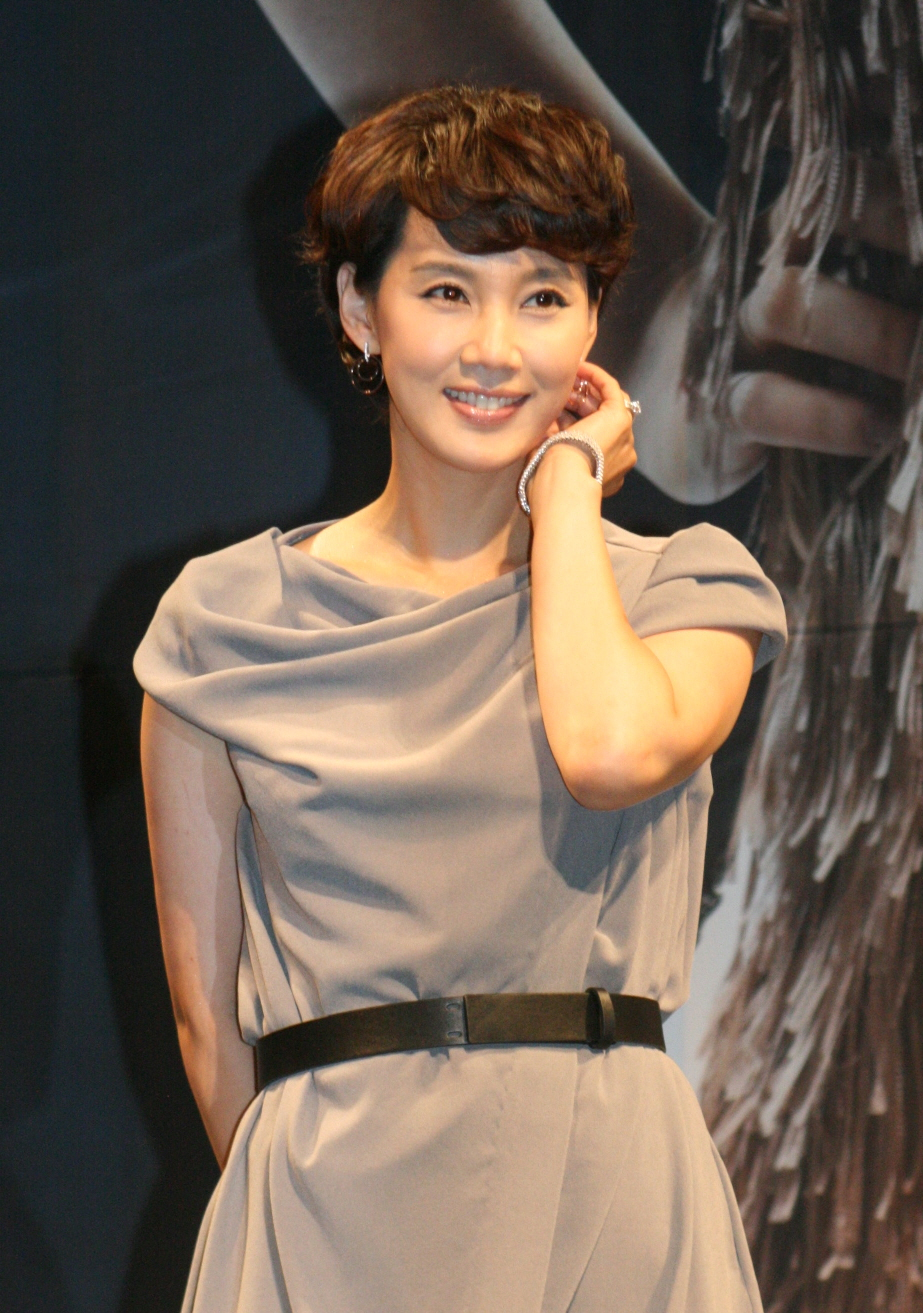
Oh in 2010

Oh Sang-ji won the 1989 Miss Korea beauty pageant, and represented her country at the Miss Universe 1990 pageant. She immediately rose to stardom. Using the stage name Oh Hyun-kyung, she received many television offers and began her acting career. She was also briefly an adjunct professor at Kongju Communication Arts College. But her career came to a halt in 1998 when a 28-minute video clip explicitly showing her having intercourse with her then-boyfriend was uploaded on file-sharing websites. Oh asked prosecutors to investigate the circumstances that led to the widespread circulation of the sex video, claiming that someone had earlier attempted to blackmail her for money. Despite proof that the video had been filmed without her consent and the boyfriend had released it with malicious intent, the scandal caused her to be harshly criticized in the media.

In 2001, she returned to Korea and later found herself in the public eye once again after a hush-hush wedding in September 2002 to Kemongsa president Hong Seung-pyo (the M&A specialist played by Bae Yong-joon in the TV series Hotelier was based on Hong). Oh gave birth to a daughter in 2003, and started a golf fashion business the year after. But in 2004 her husband Hong was arrested for embezzlement, leading to Oh divorcing him in June 2006.

Calling her 10-year self-imposed exile from the public limelight "a living nightmare," Oh returned to television in 2007 in the melodrama First Wives' Club. Her acting comeback was a success, and Oh has since starred in a succession of dramas, among them High Kick Through the Roof, Gloria, Miss Ajumma, The Great Seer, She Is Wow!, Wang's Family, 4 Legendary Witches, and The Bird That Sheds No Tears.

== Filmography ==
=== Television series ===
| Year | Title | Role | Notes | Ref. |
|---|---|---|---|---|
| 1988 | The Tree of Love | | | |
| 1989 | People from Dangchu-dong | taekwondo instructor | | |
| 1990 | Ambitious Times | Park Hyung-sook | | |
| 1992 | The Kingdom of Anger | Lee Bok-nam | | |
| 1992 | Wild Chrysanthemum | Eun-kyung | | |
| 1992 | Wind in the Grass | Je-ni | | |
| 1994 | Keep Your Voice Down | | | |
| 1994 | Way of Living: Man | Jang Soo-mi | | |
| 1994 | Police | Song Chae-yeon | | |
| 1994 | My Son's Woman | Im Ji-sook | | |
| 1995 | Flames of Ambition | Park Boo-hee | | |
| 1995 | To Make a Man | Young-ae | | |
| 1996 | Color | | | |
| 1996 | A Faraway Country | Jang Sang-hee | | |
| 1996 | Splendid Holiday | Lee Han-na | | |
| 1997 | Into the Storm | Eun-joo | | |
| 1997 | Fireworks | Jae-hee | | |
| 1997 | Three Women | Moon-jung | | |
| 1997 | Because I Love You | Eo Ji-na | | |
| 2007 | First Wives' Club | Na Hwa-shin | | |
| 2009 | High Kick Through the Roof | Lee Hyun-kyung | | |
| 2009 | Mrs. Town | Seo Hong-joo | | |
| 2010 | Gloria | Na Jin-joo | | |
| 2011 | Miss Ajumma | Kang Geum-hwa | | |
| 2011 | Protect the Boss | blind date | Cameo | |
| 2011 | Birdie Buddy | Min Se-hwa | | |
| 2011 | The Peak | Lee Joong-jik | | |
| 2012 | The Great Seer | Soo Ryun-gae | | |
| 2013 | She Is Wow! | Jo A-ra | | |
| 2013 | Don't Look Back: The Legend of Orpheus | Yoo Sun-young | | |
| 2013 | Wang's Family | Wang Su-bak | | |
| 2014 | A Mother's Choice | Jin So-young | | |
| 2014 | 4 Legendary Witches | Son Poong-geum | | |
| 2015 | A Bird That Doesn't Sing | Chun Mi-ja | | |
| 2016 | Beautiful Gong Shim | Joo Jae-boon | | |
| 2016 | The Gentlemen of Wolgyesu Tailor Shop | Lee Dong-sook | | |
| 2018 | Radio Romance | Nam Joo-ha | | |
| 2018 | A Pledge to God | Kim Jae-hee | | |
| 2020 | Amanza | Mum | | |
| 2021 | My Roommate Is a Gumiho | | Cameo | |
| 2021 | You Are My Spring | Mun Mi-ran | | |
| 2021–2022 | Young Lady and Gentleman | Cha Yeon-sil | | |
| 2022 | The Empire | Lee Ae-heon | | |
| 2024 | Suji & Uri | Oh Seon-young | | |
| 2024 | Love in the Big City | Eun-sook | | |
| 2024 | When the Phone Rings | Kim Yeon-hui | | |
| 2025–2026 | First Man | Chae Hwa-young | | |

=== Film ===
| Year | Title | Role | Notes | Ref. |
|---|---|---|---|---|
| 2015 | Twenty | Dong-woo's mother | Cameo | |
| 2023 | Unlocked | CEO Oh | | |

=== Variety shows ===
| Year | Title | Role | Notes |
|---|---|---|---|
| 1993 | FM Is My Friend | DJ | |
| 1995 | In the Field of Stars, We Can Match | Host | |
| 1996 | Saturday Mystery Theatre | Host | |
| 1996 | Challenge! Man Among Men | Host | |
| 1996 | Super Sunday – Woman Theater with Oh Hyun-kyung | Host | |
| 1997 | Attention Focused Fashion Jockey | Host | |
| 1997 | Quiz Movie Adventure | Host | |
| 2011 | Love Story | Host | |
| 2013 | Miss Korea Secret Garden | Host | |
| 2013 | The Bucket List | Host | |
| 2014 | Child Comfort | Host | |
| 2014 | Tell Me Your Wish | Host | |
| 2017 | Battle Trip | Contestant | With Jung Si-ah |
| 2017 | Living Together in Empty Room | Cast member | |
| 2022 | Curling Queens | Cast member | Holiday specials |

== Awards and nominations ==
| Award | Year | Category | Nominated work | Result |
|---|---|---|---|---|
| APAN Star Awards | 2024 | Top Excellence Award – Actress in a Serial Drama | Suji & Uri | Won |
| KBS Drama Awards | 1990 | Best New Actress | Ambitious Times | Won |
| KBS Drama Awards | 2013 | Best Supporting Actress | Wang's Family | Nominated |
| KBS Drama Awards | 2024 | Excellence Award – Actress in a Daily Drama | Suji & Uri | Nominated |
| Korean Culture and Entertainment Awards | 2008 | Best Actress – TV category | First Wives' Club | Won |
| MBC Drama Awards | 2014 | Excellence Award – Actress in a Special Project Drama | 4 Legendary Witches | Nominated |
| MBC Drama Awards | 2015 | Excellence Award – Actress in a Special Project Drama | 4 Legendary Witches | Won |
| MBC Drama Awards | 2018 | Best Supporting Actress – Weekend Special Project | A Pledge to God | Nominated |
| Miss Korea 1989 | 1989 | —N/a | —N/a | Won |
| SBS Drama Awards | 2008 | Top 10 Stars | First Wives' Club | Won |
| SBS Drama Awards | 2008 | Best Coup (with Lee Sang-woo) | First Wives' Club | Nominated |
| SBS Drama Awards | 2008 | Excellence Award – Actress in a Serial Drama | First Wives' Club | Won |
| SBS Drama Awards | 2008 | Grand Prize (Daesang) | First Wives' Club | Nominated |
| SBS Drama Awards | 2011 | Excellence Award – Actress in a Weekend/Daily Drama | Miss Ajumma | Nominated |
| SBS Drama Awards | 2012 | Special Acting Award – Actress in a Drama Special | The Great Seer | Nominated |
| SBS Drama Awards | 2014 | Special Award – Actress in a Drama Short | A Mother's Choice | Won |

| Preceded by Kim Sung-ryung | Miss Korea; 1989 | Succeeded by Seo Jung-min |
