= 2012 MBC Drama Awards =

31st edition of award ceremony

- Date: December 30, 2012
- Hosted by: Kim Jaewon; Son Dam-bi

Highlights
- Best Drama Serial: Moon Embracing the Sun
- Grand Prize (Daesang): Cho Seung-woo – The King's Doctor

Television coverage
- Network: MBC

The 2012 MBC Drama Awards is a ceremony honoring the outstanding achievement in television on the Munhwa Broadcasting Corporation (MBC) network for the year of 2012. It was held on December 30, 2012, and hosted by actor Kim Jaewon and actress Son Dam-bi.

== Nominations and winners ==
(Winners denoted in bold)

Grand Prize (Daesang)	Drama of the Year
**Cho Seung-woo** – **The King's Doctor**	**Moon Embracing the Sun**; Golden Time; Lights and Shadows; May Queen; The King's Doctor
Top Excellence Award, Actor in a Miniseries	Top Excellence Award, Actress in a Miniseries
**Kim Soo-hyun** – **Moon Embracing the Sun**; Lee Joon-gi – Arang and the Magistrate; Lee Seung-gi – The King 2 Hearts; Lee Sun-kyun – Golden Time; Song Seung-heon – Dr. Jin	**Han Ga-in** – **Moon Embracing the Sun**; Ha Ji-won – The King 2 Hearts; Kim Sun-a – I Do, I Do; Shin Min-a – Arang and the Magistrate; Yoon Eun-hye – Missing You
Top Excellence Award, Actor in a Special Project Drama	Top Excellence Award, Actress in a Special Project Drama
**Cho Seung-woo** – **The King's Doctor**; Ahn Jae-wook – Lights and Shadows; Joo Sang-wook – Feast of the Gods; Son Chang-min – The King's Doctor	**Sung Yu-ri** – **Feast of the Gods**; Lee Yo-won – The King's Doctor; Nam Sang-mi – Lights and Shadows; Yoo Sun – The King's Doctor
Top Excellence Award, Actor in a Serial Drama	Top Excellence Award, Actress in a Serial Drama
**Kim Jaewon** – **May Queen**; Jeong Bo-seok – God of War; Kim Ho-jin – Can't Live Without You; Kim Joo-hyuk – God of War; Lee Sung-jae – The Sons	**Han Ji-hye** – **May Queen**; Kim Gyu-ri – God of War; Myung Se-bin – The Sons; Park Sun-young – Can't Live Without You; Park Eun-hye – Can't Live Without You
Excellence Award, Actor in a Miniseries	Excellence Award, Actress in a Miniseries
**Park Yoo-chun** – **Missing You**; Jung Il-woo – Moon Embracing the Sun; Lee Sung-min – Golden Time, The King 2 Hearts; Yoon Je-moon – The King 2 Hearts; Yoo Seung-ho – Arang and the Magistrate, Missing You	**Lee Yoon-ji** – **The King 2 Hearts**; Hwang Bo-ra – Arang and the Magistrate; Hwang Jung-eum – Golden Time; Im Soo-hyang – I Do, I Do; Lee So-yeon – Dr. Jin
Excellence Award, Actor in a Special Project Drama	Excellence Award, Actress in a Special Project Drama
**Lee Sang-woo** – **Feast of the Gods**, **The King's Doctor**; Han Sang-jin – The King's Doctor; Lee Jong-won – Lights and Shadows; Lee Pil-mo – Lights and Shadows	**Son Dam-bi** – **Lights and Shadows**; Kim Bo-yeon – Feast of the Gods; Kim Hye-sun – The King's Doctor; Shin Da-eun – Lights and Shadows
Excellence Award, Actor in a Serial Drama	Excellence Award, Actress in a Serial Drama
**Jae Hee** – **May Queen**; Cho Yeon-woo – Can't Live Without You, Dangerous Women; Lee Joo-hyun – God of War; Park Sang-min – God of War; Ryu Soo-young – The Sons	**Seo Hyun-jin** – **Feast of the Gods**, **Here Comes Mr. Oh**; Choi Jung-yoon – Angel's Choice; Hong Ah-reum – God of War; Hwang In-young – Can't Live Without You; So Yoo-jin – Can't Live Without You
Golden Acting Award, Actor	Golden Acting Award, Actress
**Jun Kwang-ryul** – **Lights and Shadows**, **Missing You**; **Lee Deok-hwa** – **May Queen**; Jung Eun-pyo – Moon Embracing the Sun, Dr. Jin; Kim Eung-soo – Moon Embracing the Sun, Dr. Jin; Kim Kap-soo – Just Like Today	**Jeon In-hwa** – **Feast of the Gods**; **Yang Mi-kyung** – **Moon Embracing the Sun**, **May Queen**; Jeon Mi-seon – Moon Embracing the Sun; Kim Hae-sook – Can't Live Without You; Lee Hwi-hyang – Here Comes Mr. Oh, Lights and Shadows
Best New Actor	Best New Actress
**Kim Jae-joong** – **Dr. Jin**; **Lee Jang-woo** – **Here Comes Mr. Oh**, **I Do, I Do**; Jo Jung-suk – The King 2 Hearts; Seo In-guk – The Sons; Yeon Woo-jin – Arang and the Magistrate; Yim Si-wan – Moon Embracing the Sun	**Kim So-eun** – **The King's Doctor**; **Oh Yeon-seo** – **Here Comes Mr. Oh**; Kim Min-seo – Moon Embracing the Sun; Nam Bo-ra – Moon Embracing the Sun; Son Eun-seo – May Queen
Best Young Actor	Best Young Actress
**Yeo Jin-goo** – **Moon Embracing the Sun**, **Missing You**; Ahn Do-gyu – The King's Doctor; Lee Min-ho – Moon Embracing the Sun; Park Ji-bin – May Queen; Wang Seok-hyun – Can't Live Without You	**Kim So-hyun** – **Moon Embracing the Sun**, **Missing You**; **Kim Yoo-jung** – **Moon Embracing the Sun**, **May Queen**; Hyun Seung-min – May Queen; Jin Ji-hee – Moon Embracing the Sun; Roh Jeong-eui – The King's Doctor
PD Award	Writer of the Year
**Lee Sung-min** – **Golden Time**, **The King 2 Hearts**	**Jin Soo-wan** – **Moon Embracing the Sun**; **Son Young-mok** – **May Queen**
Popularity Award, Actor	Popularity Award, Actress
**Kim Soo-hyun** – **Moon Embracing the Sun**; Ahn Jae-wook – Lights and Shadows; Cho Seung-woo – The King's Doctor; Jung Il-woo – Moon Embracing the Sun; Kim Jae-joong – Dr. Jin; Kim Jae-won – May Queen; Lee Jang-woo – I Do, I Do, Here Comes Mr. Oh; Lee Joon-gi – Arang and the Magistrate; Lee Seung-gi – The King 2 Hearts; Lee Sun-kyun – Golden Time; Park Yoo-chun – Missing You; Song Seung-heon – Dr. Jin; Yeo Jin-gu – Moon Embracing the Sun, Missing You; Yim Si-wan – Moon Embracing the Sun; Yoo Seung-ho – Missing You, Arang and the Magistrate	**Yoon Eun-hye** – **Missing You**; Ha Ji-won – The King 2 Hearts; Han Ga-in – Moon Embracing the Sun; Han Ji-hye – May Queen; Hwang Jung-eum – Golden Time; Kim So-hyun – Moon Embracing the Sun, Missing You; Kim Sun-a – I Do, I Do; Kim Yoo-jung – Moon Embracing the Sun, May Queen; Lee Yo-won – The King's Doctor; Nam Sang-mi – Lights and Shadows; Oh Yeon-seo – Here Comes Mr. Oh; Park Min-young – Dr. Jin; Shin Min-a – Arang and the Magistrate; Son Dam-bi – Lights and Shadows; Sung Yu-ri – Feast of the Gods
Best Couple Award	Hallyu Star Award
**Lee Joon-gi** and **Shin Min-a** – **Arang and the Magistrate**; Ahn Jae-wook and Nam Sang-mi – Lights and Shadows; Jo Jung-seok and Lee Yoon-ji – The King 2 Hearts; Kim Jae-won and Han Ji-hye – May Queen; Kim Soo-hyun and Han Ga-in – Moon Embracing the Sun; Kim Soo-hyun and Jung Eun-pyo – Moon Embracing the Sun; Lee Jang-woo and Oh Yeon-seo – Here Comes Mr. Oh; Lee Joon-gi and Kwon Oh-joong – Arang and the Magistrate; Lee Seung-gi and Ha Ji-won – The King 2 Hearts; Lee Sun-kyun and Hwang Jung-eum – Golden Time; Lee Sun-kyun and Lee Sung-min – Golden Time; Park Jun-gyu and Yoo Seung-ho – Arang and the Magistrate; Park Yoo-chun and Yoon Eun-hye – Missing You; Yeo Jin-gu and Kim Yoo-jung – Moon Embracing the Sun; Yoo Seung-ho and Yoon Eun-hye – Missing You	**Yoon Eun-hye** – **Missing You**
Best TV Voice Actor	Best Radio Voice Actor
**Jeon Soo-bin** – **CSI: Miami (season 10)**	**Choi Sang-ki** – **Bae Han-sung's Classics**
Achievement Award
**Jo Kyung-hwan**
