= Goodbye My Love (TV series) =

South Korean television series

- Hangul: 안녕 내 사랑
- Hanja: 安寧 내 사랑
- RR: Annyeong nae sarang
- MR: Annyŏng nae sarang
- Written by: Jo Myung-jo
- Directed by: Lee Chang-soon
- Country of origin: South Korea
- Original language: Korean
- No. of episodes: 16

Production
- Producer: Lee Eun Kyu MBC

Original release
- Network: MBC
- Release: September 1 – October 21, 1999

Goodbye My Love was a South Korean television drama series that aired from September 1 to October 21, 1999 with 16 episodes.

== Storyline ==
Ahn Jae-wook stars as Min-soo, an aspiring businessman who once saved the life of his friend Gi-tae (Jung Joon-ho). Afterwards, Gi-tae's wealthy father hires Min-soo to keep Gi-tae out of trouble. Min-soo later meets Yeon-joo (Kim Hee-sun), a factory worker with financial problems.

== Cast ==
- Kim Hee-sun as Seo Yeon-joo
- Ahn Jae-wook as Chang Min-soo
- Jung Joon-ho as Choi Gi-tae
- Lee Hye-young as Im Jung-ae (Yeon-joo's roommate)
- Lee Tae-ran as Choi Hee-jung (Gi-tae's sister)
- Yoo Jun-sang as Song Dae-ho (Min-soo's friend)
- Joo Hyun as Choi Hyun-su (Gi-tae's father)
- Lee Yoon-sung
- Choi Jae-won
- Seol Soo-jin
- Kwon Yun-woo
- Kim Min-jung
- Song Il-kook (cameo, episodes 1 & 10)
