= Lights and Shadows (TV series) =

South Korean television series

- Promotional poster for Lights and Shadows
- Also known as: Light and Shadow
- Hangul: 빛과 그림자
- RR: Bitgwa geurimja
- MR: Pitkwa kŭrimja
- Genre: Romance; Drama; Musical; Period drama
- Written by: Choi Wan-kyu
- Directed by: Lee Joo-hwan
- Starring: Ahn Jae-wook; Nam Sang-mi; Lee Pil-mo; Son Dam-bi
- Country of origin: South Korea
- Original language: Korean
- No. of episodes: 64

Production
- Running time: 70 minutes
- Production companies: KPAX; Lights and Shadows SPC

Original release
- Network: Munhwa Broadcasting Corporation
- Release: November 28, 2011 – July 3, 2012

Lights and Shadows (Korean: 빛과 그림자) is a 2011 South Korean retro-drama series, starring Ahn Jae-wook, Nam Sang-mi, Lee Pil-mo and Son Dam-bi. It aired on MBC from November 28, 2011 to July 3, 2012 on Mondays and Tuesdays at 21:55 for 64 episodes.

The series was originally planned for 50 episodes, but it was extended to 64 due to high ratings.

== Plot ==
It tells the story of Kang Ki-tae who came from a wealthy family and became the first national entertainer during the Vietnam War in the 1970s and 1980s.

== Cast ==
=== Main characters ===
- Ahn Jae-wook as Kang Ki-tae
- Nam Sang-mi as Lee Jung-hye
- Lee Pil-mo as Cha Soo-hyuk
- Son Dam-bi as Yoo Chae-young

=== Supporting characters ===
- Jun Kwang-ryul as Jang Chul-hwan
- Lee Jong-won as Jo Myung-kook
- Sung Ji-ru as Shin Jung-goo
- Shin Da-eun as Kang Myung-hee
- Son Jin-young as Hong Soo-bong
- Ahn Gil-kang as Noh Sang-taek
- Lee Se-chang as Choi Sung-won
- Kim Hee-won as Yang Tae-sung
- Ryu Dam as Yang Dong-chul
- Jun Gook-hwan as Kang Man-shik
- Park Won-sook as Park Kyung-ja
- Kim Mi-kyung as Kim Geum-rye
- Seo Seung-man as Johnny Boy
- Kim Dong-gyoon as Cherry Boy
- Ha Jae-sook as Lee Kyung-sook
- Lee Ah-yi as Kim Gye-soon
- Narsha as Lee Jung-ja
- Han Ki-woong as Gi-woong
- Jo Mi-ryung as Soon-ae
- Heo Ga-yoon as Hyun-kyung
- Hong Jin-young as Yoon Ji-hye
- Cha Tae-hyun as drunkard (cameo, ep 2)
- Seungri as Ahn Jae-su (cameo, ep 9-10)
- Kim Gyu-ri

== Awards and nominations ==
Year	Award	Category	Recipient	Result
2012	MBC Drama Awards	Drama of the Year	Lights and Shadows	Nominated
2012	MBC Drama Awards	Top Excellence Award, Actor in a Special Project Drama	Ahn Jae-wook	Nominated
2012	MBC Drama Awards	Top Excellence Award, Actress in a Special Project Drama	Nam Sang-mi	Nominated
2012	MBC Drama Awards	Excellence Award, Actor in a Special Project Drama	Lee Jong-won	Nominated
2012	MBC Drama Awards	Excellence Award, Actor in a Special Project Drama	Lee Pil-mo	Nominated
2012	MBC Drama Awards	Excellence Award, Actress in a Special Project Drama	Shin Da-eun	Nominated
2012	MBC Drama Awards	Golden Acting Award, Actor	Jun Kwang-ryul	Won
2012	MBC Drama Awards	Golden Acting Award, Actress	Lee Hwi-hyang	Nominated

== International broadcast ==
- It aired in Vietnam on VTC9 - Let's Viet beginning February 22, 2014, under the title Ánh sáng và bóng tối.
