= Pot Stand =

- Also known as: We Like Zines; Pot Holder
- 냄비받침
- Genre: Reality television
- Starring: Lee Kyung-kyu; Ahn Jae-wook; Kim Hee-chul; You Hee-yeol; Lee Yong-dae; Twice
- Country of origin: South Korea
- Original language: Korean
- No. of episodes: 13

Production
- Running time: 60-110 minutes

Original release
- Network: KBS2
- Release: June 6 – September 5, 2017

Pot Stand (Korean: 냄비받침) is a South Korean variety show which first ran on June 6, 2017, on KBS2 at 11:10 PM KST. It is a real variety show wherein guests publish their own books, recording the events of their daily lives to share them with others.

== Hosts ==
Hosts	Episode #	Book Title(s)
Lee Kyung-kyu	1–13	The Leaders Series
Ahn Jae-wook	1, 2, 4, 5, 7, 8, 10–13	Toasting Guide; The Restaurants that I Don't Want to Recommend
Kim Hee-chul (Super Junior)	1, 3, 6, 13	Girl Groups 101.Know These Things First
Lee Yong-dae	1, 2, 5, 13	My Final Relationship of My Life (To My Daughter)
Twice	1, 3, 13	Want to Really Know About Twice?

== List of episodes and guests ==
In the ratings below, the highest rating for the show will be in red, and the lowest rating for the show will be in blue episode.

Episode #	Air Date	Guest(s)	AGB Nielsen ratings
1	June 6, 2017	-	2.4%
2	June 13, 2017	Yoo Seong-min	2.5%
3	June 20, 2017	Yoo Seong-min, Pristin	2.2%
4	June 27, 2017	Yoo Seong-min, Sim Sang-jung	3.6%
5	July 4, 2017	So Yoo-jin, Baek Jong-won, Goo-yeon Heo, Kim Eung-ryong, Kim Tae-kyun, Sun Dong-yol	2.1%
6	July 11, 2017	Ahn Hee-jung, So Yoo-jin, Baek Jong-won, Baek Ji-young (phone interview), Cosmic Girls	2.5%
7	July 18, 2017	Choo Mi-ae, Kim Heung-gook, Jo Se-ho	2.3%
8	July 25, 2017	Hong Jun-pyo, Kim Heung-gook, Jo Se-ho	3.4%
9	August 1, 2017	Son Hye-won, Na Kyung-won	2.8%
10	August 8, 2017	Park Won-soon, Kim Shin-young, Hong Jin-young	2.3%
11	August 22, 2017	Lee Hye-hoon, Roh Hoe-chan, Song Eun-i, Kim Saeng-min	1.8%
12	August 29, 2017	Hong Kyung-min, Chung Sye-kyun, Cha Tae-hyun	2.3%
13	September 5, 2017	Kyulkyung (Pristin), Hani (EXID), Lee Ha-nui, Hyuna, DIA, MOMOLAND, Yoo Chang-jun (chef, father of Yoo Jeongyeon & Gong Seungyeon)	1.5%
