= Na Hye-mi =

South Korean actress (born 1991)

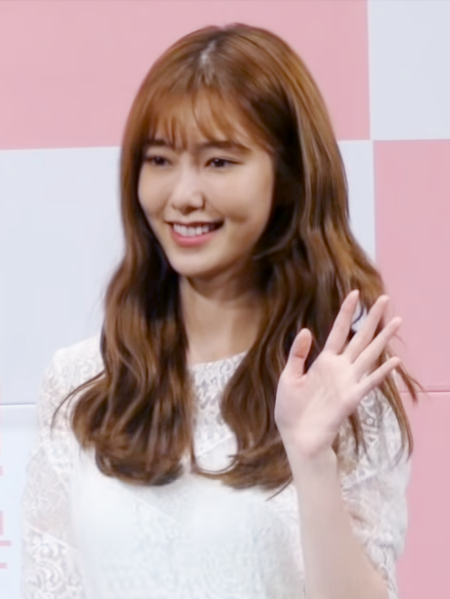
- Na in December 2018
- Born: 24 February 1991 (age 35); Icheon, South Korea
- Education: Hwasu High School; Chung-Ang University (Theater and Film)
- Occupations: Actress; model
- Years active: 2001–present
- Agent: Tori Entertainment
- Spouse: Eric Mun (m. 2017)
- Children: 2

Korean name
- Hangul: 나혜미
- Hanja: 羅惠美
- RR: Na Hyemi
- MR: Na Hyemi

Na Hye-mi (Korean: 나혜미; born on February 24, 1991) is a South Korean actress and model. She made her first screen debut with a supporting role in Address Unknown film when she was 10 year-old. After Unstoppable High Kick, Na took a long break from acting to complete her studies. She has modelled for various television advertisement such as Samsung notebooks M, Kia Morning, Acuvue, KB card, as well as magazines like Elle Girl, Ceci, Vogue, bnt, and Cosmopolitan.

After getting married, Na continued to work in some small projects. She appeared in the popular weekend drama My Only One. While filming for My Only One, she was cast in another KBS daily drama Home for Summer which premiered on April 29, 2019. Na took on a lead role for KBS's 2019 one-episode drama special, Clean and Polish.

== Personal life ==
=== Relationship and marriage ===
In 2014 it was reported that Na and Eric Mun of group Shinhwa were dating. However both did not confirm the relationship at that time. In late February 2017, dating speculation surfaced again that the couple had been maintaining their relationship after the news first broke in 2014. Through their agencies, both Mun and Na confirmed their relationship. The couple got married on July 1, 2017 at Youngnak Church in Jung District, Seoul, South Korea.

On August 23, 2022, it was confirmed that Na was pregnant with the couple's first child, after 6 years of marriage. She gave birth to a son on March 1, 2023. On January 6, 2025, Na's second pregnancy was announced. Their second son was born on March 19, 2025.

== Filmography ==
=== Television series ===
Year	Title	Role	Network	Notes/Ref.
2020–2021	No Matter What	Kim Bo-ra	KBS1	
2019	Clean and Polish	Mo Anna	KBS2	
2019	Home for Summer	Wang Geum-joo	KBS1	
2018	My Only One	Kim Mi-Ran	KBS2	
2017	My Sassy Girl	Bo-Young	SBS	
2013	Melody of Love	Jung Hye-Young	KBS1	
2006	High Kick!	Na Hye-Mi	MBC	
2006	Over the Rainbow	Kwon Ji-Hye	MBC	
2006	MBC Best Theater: "Take Care, Youth"	Supporting role	MBC	

=== Film ===
Year	Title	Korean title
2018	Hana Restaurant	하나식당
2017	Cheese in the Trap	치즈 인 더 트랩
2001	Address Unknown	수취인불명

=== Music video appearances ===
Year	Artist	Song
2007	SG Wannabe	"Christmas Story" (크리스마스이야기)
2010	Untouchable	"Living in the Heart" (가슴에 살아)
2010	Buzz	"Buzzing Rock"

== Television advertisement ==
Year	Title
2019	Vitabrid Scalp Shampoo Plus
2018	31°C Cosmetic
2015	Chung Jung One - Return of the Garden (dried snacks)
2009	DemiSoda (soft drink)
2007	Korean Johnson & Johnson's 1-Day Acuvue
2006	KTF 7.9mm Mobile Phone
2006	Chinese Garnier Cosmetic

== Awards and nominations ==
Year	Award	Category	Nominated work	Result	Ref.
2019	12th Korea Drama Awards	Best New Actress	Home for Summer	Nominated	
2019	33rd KBS Drama Awards	Best Supporting Actress	Home for Summer	Nominated	
2019	33rd KBS Drama Awards	Best Actress in a One-Act/Special/Short Drama	Drama Special – Clean and Polish	Nominated	
2020	34th KBS Drama Awards	Excellence Award, Actress in a Daily Drama	No Matter What	Nominated	
