= Here Comes Mr. Oh =

2012 South Korean TV drama series

- Promotional poster
- Also known as: Oh Ja-ryong is Coming; Here Comes Oh Ja-ryong
- Hangul: 오자룡이 간다
- RR: O Jaryongi ganda
- MR: O Charyongi kanda
- Genre: Family; Romance
- Written by: Kim Sa-kyung
- Directed by: Choi Won-seok; Lee Jae-jin
- Starring: Lee Jang-woo; Oh Yeon-seo; Jin Tae-hyun; Seo Hyun-jin
- Composer: Lee Ji-yong
- Country of origin: South Korea
- Original language: Korean
- No. of episodes: 129

Production
- Executive producer: Yoon Jae-moon
- Producers: Kwak Ji-hoon; Kim Seon-ho
- Cinematography: Kim Il-man
- Editor: Park Jung-hye
- Running time: 30 minutes
- Production companies: DK E&M; Curtain Call Media; Wellmade Star M

Original release
- Network: Munhwa Broadcasting Corporation
- Release: November 19, 2012 – May 17, 2013

Here Comes Mr. Oh (Korean: 오자룡이 간다; lit. 'Here Comes Oh Ja-ryong') is a 2012 South Korean television series starring Lee Jang-woo, Oh Yeon-seo, Jin Tae-hyun, and Seo Hyun-jin. The daily drama aired on MBC on Mondays to Fridays at 19:15 from November 19, 2012 to May 17, 2013 for 129 episodes.

== Plot ==
The drama juxtaposes two very different men who married two sisters. Oh Ja-ryong is a gregarious and good-natured fellow with a pure heart who is honestly devoted to his wife Gong-joo, while Jin Yong-seok married his wife Jin-joo because of her family's fortune and is now plotting to steal their estate. The jobless Ja-ryong stands up to his greedy and conniving brother-in-law Yong-seok, and saves his in-laws from ruin.

== Cast ==
=== Main characters ===
- Lee Jang-woo as Oh Ja-ryong
- Oh Yeon-seo as Na Gong-joo
- Jin Tae-hyun as Jin Yong-seok
- Seo Hyun-jin as Na Jin-joo

=== Supporting characters ===
==== Na family ====
- Chang Mi-hee as Jang Baek-ro
- Dokgo Young-jae as Na Sang-ho

==== Oh family ====
- Kim Hye-ok as Go Sung-sil
- Kim Young-ok as Chun Geum-soon
- Han Jin-hee as Oh Man-soo
- Ryu Dam as Oh Jae-ryong

==== Lee family ====
- Lee Hwi-hyang as Lee Ki-ja
- Jo Mi-ryung as Lee Ki-young

=== Extended cast ===
- Jung Chan as Kang In-gook
- Yoo Ho-rin as Kim Ma-ri
- Kim Min-soo as Jang Min-woo
- Jang Joon-yoo as Se-ra
- Kim Choo-wol as Soo-yeon
- Jung Da-hye as Mi-rim
- Lee Re as Byul, In-gook's daughter
- Park Hyun-sook as homeless director
- Park Seon-hee as Gamjatang vice manager
- Kil Yong-woo as Wang Chul-soo
- Choi Min as Kang Sung-shik
- Kim Jung-do as Kwang-soo
- Choi Hyun-seo as Yoo-mi
- Lee Jin-saem
- Yoo Soo-in

== Awards ==
2012 MBC Drama Awards

- Excellence Award, Actress in a Serial Drama: Seo Hyun-jin.
- Best New Actor: Lee Jang-woo.
- Best New Actress: Oh Yeon-seo.

2013 Korea Drama Awards

- Excellence Award, Actress: Seo Hyun-jin.

2013 APAN Star Awards

- Popular Star Award, Actress: Oh Yeon-seo.

2013 Korean Culture and Entertainment Awards

- Excellence Award, Actor in Drama: Lee Jang-woo.
