= Lee Hwi-hyang =

South Korean actress (born 1960)

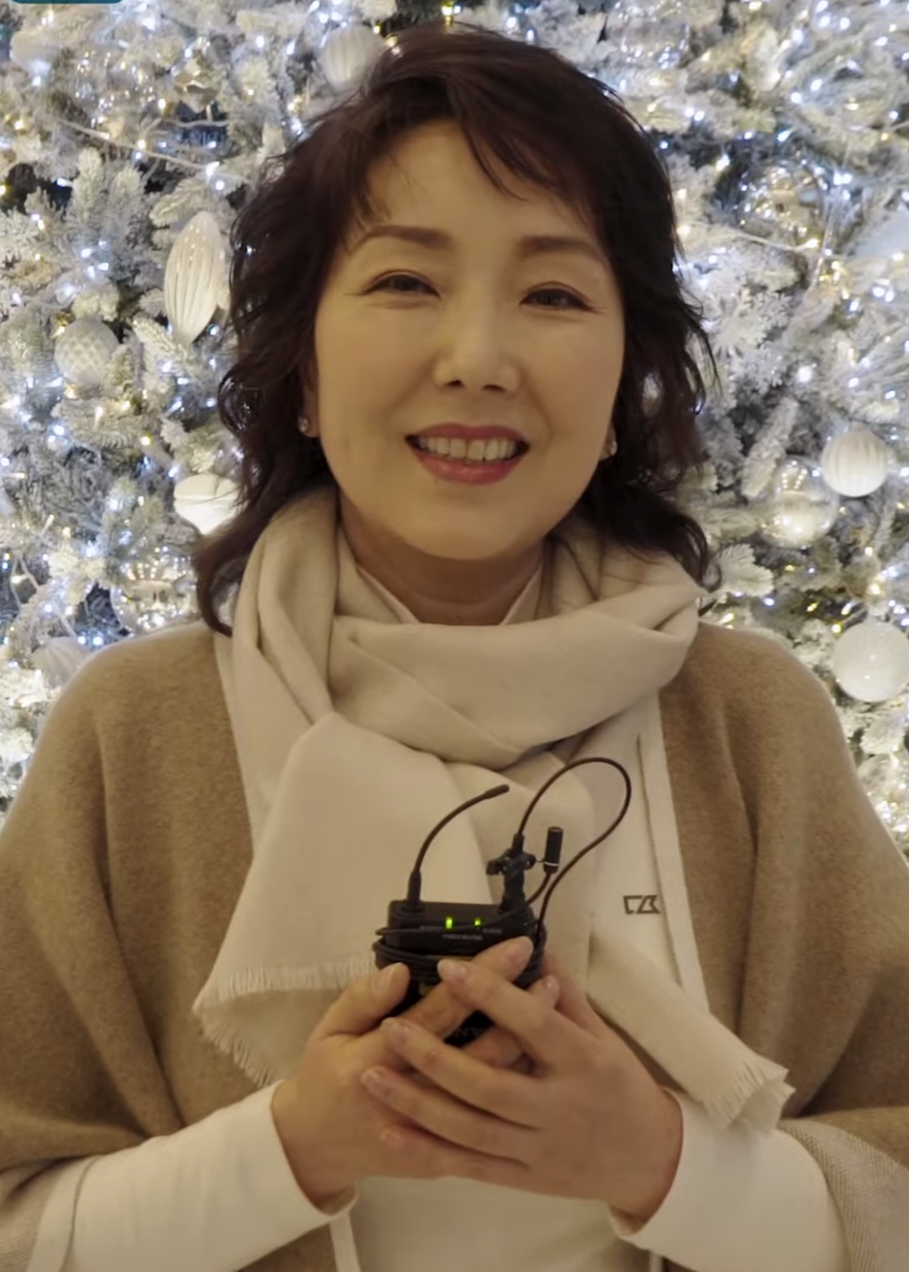
- Lee in December 2022
- Born: October 1, 1960 (age 66); South Korea
- Education: Seoul Institute of the Arts - Theater
- Occupation: Actress
- Years active: 1982–present
- Spouse: Kim Du-jo (m. 1982; died 2005)
- Children: 1

Korean name
- Hangul: 이휘향
- RR: I Hwihyang
- MR: I Hwihyang

Lee Hwi-hyang (Korean: 이휘향; born October 1, 1960) is a South Korean actress. She joined the Miss MBC beauty pageant in 1981, and made her acting debut in 1982. Among Lee's notable television dramas are Love and Ambition (1987), Forget Tomorrow (1988), Ambitious Times (1990), and The Beginning of Happiness (1996).

== Filmography ==
=== Television series ===
Year	Title	Role
1982	Chief Inspector	
1986	Dew on Every Blade of Grass	Baek Sang-hee
1987	Love and Ambition	Jae-eun
1987	Guests Who Arrived on the Last Train	
1988	Forget Tomorrow	Oh Se-young
1988	We Don't Know Either	
1988	Blue Season	
1989	Moonlight Family	Eldest daughter-in-law
1989	500 Years of Joseon: Pamun	Queen Hyoui
1990	Days of the Dynasty	Yi Bangja
1990	Ambitious Times	Gelsomina
1992	Sweetheart	
1993	Lovers	
1994	I Will Kiss Your Cheek	
1994	Ambition	
1994	General Hospital	Kim Ji-won
1994	Daughters of a Rich Family	Kwon Il-ryung
1995	Love Formula	Han Cha-sook
1996	The Beginning of Happiness	Jin Yoo-kyung/Jin Hee-sook
1996	Meeting	Yoo Kang-ae
1996	Dad's Soul	
1997	One Fine Spring Day	Eon-hyang
1998	I Want to Keep Seeing You	Park Ja-young
1998	As We Live Our Lives	
1998	My Mother's Daughters	Hyun-ae
1999	KAIST	Lee Hee-jung
1999	Love in 3 Colors	Kim Sun-young
2000	Secret	Yoon Myung-ae
2001	Ladies of the Palace	Merchant Jang
2001	Beautiful Days	Yang Mi-mi/Yang Kyung-hee
2001	Why Women?	Wife of the Ha family's middle son
2002	Sunlight Upon Me	Miss Yoon
2003	Briar Flower	Ahn Sung-hee
2003	Stairway to Heaven	Tae Mi-ra
2004	Forbidden Love	Shin Soo-jang
2004	Ireland	Kim Boo-ja
2005	Spring Day	Oh Hye-rim
2005	Pearl Earring	Han Sun-jin
2007	Ahyeon-dong Madam	Sung Mi-sook
2008	I Am Happy	Lee Se-young
2009	Innocent You	Yoon Soon-hee
2009	Loving You a Thousand Times	Son Hyang-sook
2010	Please Marry Me	Song In-sun
2011	I Trusted Men	
2011	My Love By My Side	Bae Jung-ja
2011	Lights and Shadows	Song Mi-jin
2011	You're Here, You're Here, You're Really Here	Oh Se-ah
2012	Take Care of Us, Captain	Yang Mi-hye
2012	Here Comes Mr. Oh	Lee Ki-ja
2013	Two Women's Room	Yeo Ok-sun
2013	Shining Romance	Kim Ae-sook
2014	You're Only Mine	Jang Young-sook
2015	The Family is Coming	Kim Jung-sook
2015	Warm and Cozy	Baek Se-young (cameo, ep. 1)
2015	Save the Family	Bok Soo-ja
2016	Marriage Contract	Oh Mi-ran
2016	Blow Breeze	Ma Chung-ja
2017	The Secret of My Love	Wi Seon-ae
2018	My Only One	
2018	You Drive Me Crazy	Cameo
2018	A Pledge to God	Heo Eun-sook
2021	Oh My Ladylord	Kang Hae-jin
2021–2022	Young Lady and Gentleman	Lee Ki-ja, Josora's mother
2022	Gold Mask	Ko Mi-sook
2023–2024	Live Your Own Life	Jang Sook-hyang

=== Film ===
Year	Title	Role	Notes
2006	Lost in Love	Yeon-soo's mother	
2007	A Love	Sang-woo's mother (cameo)	
2008	Humming	Mi-yeon's aunt (cameo)	
2008	Antique	White beard's female roommate	
2009	Five Senses of Eros	Lee Jung-ha's mother	segment: "In My End Is My Beginning"
2009	A Dream Comes True	(cameo)	telecinema
2013	In My End Is My Beginning	Lee Jung-ha's mother	
2014	Confession	Hyun-tae's mother	

== Theater ==
Year	Title	Role
	North and South DMZ	
	Daughters of the Earth	
	Private Lives	
	Dance	
	Blood Wedding	

== Awards and nominations ==
Year	Award	Category	Nominated work	Result
1981	Miss MBC Pageant	June Miss MBC	—N/a	Won
1985	Korea Theater Festival	Best Actress	Daughters of the Earth	Won
1988	MBC Drama Awards	Excellence Award, Actress	Forget Tomorrow	Won
1990	KBS Drama Awards	Top Excellence Award, Actress	Days of the Dynasty, Ambitious Times	Won
1991	27th Baeksang Arts Awards	Best Actress (TV)	Ambitious Times	Won
1996	SBS Drama Awards	Top Excellence Award, Actress	The Beginning of Happiness	Won
1999	KBS Drama Awards	Top Excellence Award, Actress	Love in 3 Colors	Won
2006	43rd Grand Bell Awards	Best Supporting Actress	Lost in Love	Nominated
2009	SBS Drama Awards	Best Supporting Actress in a Serial Drama	Loving You a Thousand Times, Innocent You	Won
2011	SBS Drama Awards	Top Excellence Award, Actress in a Weekend/Daily Drama	My Love By My Side	Nominated
2012	MBC Drama Awards	Golden Acting Award, Actress	Here Comes Mr. Oh, Lights and Shadows	Nominated
2016	36th MBC Drama Awards	Golden Acting Award, Actress in a Special Project Drama	Marriage Contract	Won
2018	MBC Drama Awards	Best Supporting Actress in a Weekend Special Project	A Pledge to God	Nominated
