= Home for Summer =

2019 South Korean television series

- Promotional poster
- Hangul: 여름아 부탁해
- Lit.: Please, Summer
- RR: Yeoreuma butakhae
- MR: Yŏrŭma put'akhae
- Genre: Family; Melodrama
- Written by: Goo Ji-won
- Directed by: Seong Joon-hae
- Starring: Lee Young-eun; Yoon Sun-woo; Lee Chae-young; Kim Sa-kwon; Kim Hye-ok; Na Hye-mi
- Country of origin: South Korea
- Original language: Korean
- No. of episodes: 128 (Note: Originally scheduled to air for 120 episodes, the series was extended by eight episodes due to its popularity.)

Production
- Running time: 35 minutes
- Production company: KBS Drama Production

Original release
- Network: KBS1
- Release: April 29 – October 25, 2019

Home for Summer (Korean: 여름아 부탁해) is a South Korean television series starring Lee Young-eun, Yoon Sun-woo, Lee Chae-young, Kim Sa-kwon, Kim Hye-ok and Na Hye-mi. The series aired daily on KBS1 from 20:25 to 21:00 (KST) from April 29, 2019, to October 25, 2019.

== Synopsis ==
A heartwarming story about family members who cannot hate each other even when they want to.

== Cast ==
=== Main ===
- Lee Young-eun as Wang Geum-hee
- Yoon Sun-woo as Joo Sang-won
- Lee Chae-young as Joo Sang-mi
- Kim Sa-kwon as Han Joon-ho
- Kim Hye-ok as Na Yeong-sim
- Na Hye-mi as Wang Geum-joo

=== Supporting ===
==== Na Yeong-sim's family ====
- Lee Han-wi as Wang Jae-gook
- Seo Byuk-joon as Wang Geum-dong

==== Joo Yong-jin's family ====
- Kang Seok-woo as Joo Yong-jin
- Moon Hee-kyung as Heo Kyeong-ae
- Im Chae-won as Joo Yong-soon
- Son Jong-bum as Park Soo-cheol

==== Han Joon-ho's family ====
- Kim Ye-ryeong as Byeon Myeong-ja
- Kim San-ho as Han Seok-ho

==== YJ Plastic Surgery's doctors ====
- Byeon Joo-eun as Yoon Seon-kyeong
- Kim Ga-ran as Jeong So-ra

==== Others ====
- Kim Kiri as Oh Dae-seong
- Bae Woo-hee as Jin Soo-yeon
- Lee Jung-hyuk as Choi Seung-min
- Kim Bum-jin as Lee Dong-wook
- Song Min-jae as Seo / Han Yeo-reum

== Production ==
Early working title of the series is Queen's Children (왕비의 자식들).

== Viewership ==
In this table, the blue numbers represent the lowest ratings and the red numbers represent the highest ratings.

Ep.	Original broadcast date	Average audience share (AGB Nielsen)	
Ep.	Original broadcast date	Nationwide	Seoul
1	April 29, 2019	18.5%	16.1%
2	April 30, 2019	15.5%	13.8%
3	May 1, 2019	15.2%	12.9%
4	May 2, 2019	15.7%	14.2%
5	May 3, 2019	15.5%	14.7%
6	May 6, 2019	13.4%	11.8%
7	May 7, 2019	15.7%	14.2%
8	May 8, 2019	14.2%	11.7%
9	May 10, 2019 (Note: No episode was aired on May 9 due to the airing of a news special.)	14.3%	12.7%
10	May 13, 2019	16.6%	15.0%
11	May 14, 2019	14.8%	13.6%
12	May 15, 2019	15.1%	13.5%
13	May 16, 2019	15.1%	12.8%
14	May 17, 2019	14.7%	12.8%
15	May 20, 2019	15.4%	13.6%
16	May 21, 2019	15.4%	13.9%
17	May 22, 2019	14.7%	13.3%
18	May 23, 2019	15.8%	14.7%
19	May 24, 2019	13.8%	12.0%
20	May 27, 2019	16.2%	14.3%
21	May 28, 2019	15.1%	13.5%
22	May 29, 2019	14.6%	13.3%
23	May 30, 2019	15.1%	13.8%
24	May 31, 2019	15.7%	14.5%
25	June 3, 2019	15.6%	14.5%
26	June 4, 2019	15.0%	12.9%
27	June 5, 2019	14.6%	13.6%
28	June 6, 2019	16.6%	15.0%
29	June 7, 2019	15.0%	14.4%
30	June 10, 2019	16.4%	15.2%
31	June 11, 2019	12.7%	11.3%
32	June 12, 2019	14.5%	12.4%
33	June 13, 2019	17.1%	15.3%
34	June 14, 2019	16.3%	14.6%
35	June 17, 2019	17.4%	15.2%
36	June 18, 2019	17.0%	16.3%
37	June 19, 2019	16.2%	15.1%
38	June 20, 2019	17.4%	15.8%
39	June 21, 2019	17.0%	16.0%
40	June 24, 2019	18.2%	15.7%
41	June 25, 2019	18.4%	16.4%
42	June 26, 2019	18.3%	15.8%
43	June 27, 2019	18.9%	17.8%
44	June 28, 2019	17.9%	16.3%
45	July 1, 2019	18.0%	16.3%
46	July 2, 2019	17.6%	15.7%
47	July 3, 2019	17.7%	15.9%
48	July 4, 2019	18.1%	16.4%
49	July 5, 2019	16.9%	15.3%
50	July 8, 2019	18.0%	16.1%
51	July 9, 2019	18.0%	17.2%
52	July 10, 2019	18.1%	16.5%
53	July 11, 2019	19.0%	17.4%
54	July 12, 2019	17.7%	16.6%
55	July 15, 2019	19.0%	17.1%
56	July 16, 2019	19.4%	18.1%
57	July 17, 2019	17.3%	15.6%
58	July 18, 2019	18.8%	16.5%
59	July 19, 2019	18.1%	16.7%
60	July 22, 2019	19.5%	18.2%
61	July 23, 2019	19.7%	18.6%
62	July 24, 2019	18.9%	16.9%
63	July 25, 2019	20.2%	18.5%
64	July 26, 2019	17.6%	16.6%
65	July 29, 2019	18.3%	16.3%
66	July 30, 2019	20.0%	18.6%
67	July 31, 2019	18.9%	17.2%
68	August 1, 2019	18.5%	17.1%
69	August 2, 2019	17.2%	15.9%
70	August 5, 2019	19.1%	17.2%
71	August 6, 2019	21.6%	19.3%
72	August 7, 2019	19.7%	17.1%
73	August 8, 2019	20.8%	18.9%
74	August 9, 2019	20.7%	18.9%
75	August 12, 2019	21.1%	19.4%
76	August 13, 2019	20.2%	18.5%
77	August 14, 2019	19.6%	17.7%
78	August 15, 2019	21.4%	19.5%
79	August 16, 2019	20.6%	18.8%
80	August 19, 2019	21.7%	19.6%
81	August 20, 2019	20.9%	19.4%
82	August 21, 2019	21.7%	19.4%
83	August 22, 2019	22.0%	20.0%
84	August 23, 2019	21.1%	19.6%
85	August 26, 2019	23.2%	21.4%
86	August 27, 2019	22.3%	20.3%
87	August 28, 2019	20.9%	18.0%
88	August 29, 2019	21.8%	19.4%
89	August 30, 2019	21.0%	19.5%
90	September 2, 2019	22.6%	20.5%
91	September 3, 2019	22.8%	20.4%
92	September 4, 2019	23.0%	21.5%
93	September 5, 2019	23.2%	20.7%
94	September 6, 2019	21.1%	18.9%
95	September 9, 2019	23.4%	20.7%
96	September 10, 2019	22.6%	20.2%
97	September 11, 2019	20.9%	18.8%
98	September 12, 2019	18.3%	17.1%
99	September 13, 2019	16.4%	15.5%
100	September 16, 2019	23.3%	21.2%
101	September 17, 2019	23.4%	21.3%
102	September 18, 2019	23.3%	21.0%
103	September 19, 2019	24.2%	21.8%
104	September 20, 2019	22.6%	20.2%
105	September 23, 2019	24.2%	22.1%
106	September 24, 2019	23.8%	22.0%
107	September 25, 2019	23.1%	20.8%
108	September 26, 2019	24.3%	21.7%
109	September 27, 2019	22.8%	20.5%
110	September 30, 2019	23.7%	21.3%
111	October 1, 2019	25.2%	22.4%
112	October 3, 2019 (Note: No episode was aired on October 2 due to news coverage of Typhoon Mitag.)	23.7%	21.3%
113	October 4, 2019	23.7%	20.9%
114	October 7, 2019	24.9%	23.1%
115	October 8, 2019	23.6%	22.3%
116	October 9, 2019	22.6%	20.4%
117	October 10, 2019	22.4%	20.8%
118	October 11, 2019	23.4%	21.5%
119	October 14, 2019	22.2%	20.4%
120	October 15, 2019	23.4%	21.4%
121	October 16, 2019	23.3%	21.3%
122	October 17, 2019	24.7%	22.3%
123	October 18, 2019	23.7%	21.5%
124	October 21, 2019	23.8%	20.9%
125	October 22, 2019	21.7%	19.1%
126	October 23, 2019	22.4%	20.4%
127	October 24, 2019	24.0%	21.7%
128	October 25, 2019	23.1%	20.9%
Average		19.3%	17.5%

== Awards and nominations ==
Year	Award	Category	Recipient	Result	Ref.
2019	12th Korea Drama Awards	Best New Actress	Na Hye-mi	Nominated	
2019	31st KBS Drama Awards	Excellence Award, Actor in a Daily Drama	Yoon Sun-woo	Nominated	
2019	31st KBS Drama Awards	Excellence Award, Actress in a Daily Drama	Lee Young-eun	Won	
2019	31st KBS Drama Awards	Best Young Actor	Song Min-jae	Nominated	
