= Real Man (TV series) =

2013–2016 South Korean variety TV show

- Promotional image
- Genre: Reality television
- Directed by: Kim Min-jong; Kim Myung-jin; Im Kyung-sik
- Country of origin: South Korea
- Original language: Korean
- No. of seasons: 2
- No. of episodes: 187

Production
- Executive producer: Kim Young-jin
- Running time: 90 minutes

Original release
- Network: MBC
- Release: April 14, 2013 – November 27, 2016

Related
- Sunday Night, Real Man 300

Real Man (Korean: 진짜 사나이; RR: Jinjja sanai) is a South Korean variety show featuring eight male celebrities as they experience life in the military, which is mandatory for all mentally sound and able-bodied Korean men for two years. The show debuted on MBC on April 14, 2013, as part of the Sunday Night programming block. The last episode of season 2 aired on November 27, 2016.

The original cast members were Kim Soo-ro, Mir, Ryu Soo-young, Sam Hammington, Seo Kyung-suk and Son Jin-young. Jang Hyuk and Park Hyung-sik later joined the cast.

Mir left the show in June 2013. Ryu Soo-young, Son Jin-young and Jang Hyuk left the show in February 2014 and were replaced by Chun Jung-myung, Park Gun-hyung, K.Will, and Henry Lau.

A spin-off of this program called Real Man 300 began to air every Friday at 21:50 (KST) starting from September 21, 2018.

On 30 July 2023, A Malaysian version Real Man called Real Man Malaysia: Wira Merah, aired on Astro Ria.

== Male cast members ==
=== Season 1 ===
(initial sort by debut date)

Member	Debut date	End date
Kim Soo-ro	March 25, 2013	January 18, 2015
Seo Kyung-suk	March 25, 2013	January 18, 2015
Sam Hammington	March 25, 2013	January 18, 2015
Mir	March 25, 2013	June 2, 2013
Ryu Soo-young	March 25, 2013	February 9, 2014
Son Jin-young	March 25, 2013	February 9, 2014
Jang Hyuk	June 9, 2013	February 9, 2014
Park Hyung-sik	June 9, 2013	August 17, 2014
Park Gun-hyung	February 16, 2014	January 18, 2015
K.Will	February 16, 2014	January 18, 2015
Henry Lau	February 16, 2014	January 18, 2015
Chun Jung-myung	March 23, 2014	October 19, 2014
Yoo Jun-sang	October 26, 2014	November 9, 2014
Moon Hee-joon	October 26, 2014	November 9, 2014
Kim Dong-hyun	October 26, 2014	January 18, 2015
Yook Sungjae	October 26, 2014	January 18, 2015
Im Hyung-joon	October 26, 2014	January 18, 2015

=== Season 2 ===
(initial sort by debut date)

==== Main edition ====
Member	Debut date	End date
Kim Seung-hyun	February 10, 2015	April 5, 2015
Kangin	February 10, 2015	April 5, 2015
Youngmin	February 10, 2015	April 5, 2015
Kwangmin	February 10, 2015	April 5, 2015
Sam Kim	February 10, 2015	June 21, 2015
Lee Kyu-han	February 10, 2015	August 23, 2015
Sam Okyere	February 10, 2015	February 7, 2016
Im Won-hee	February 10, 2015	February 14, 2016
Jung Gyu-woon	February 10, 2015	February 14, 2016
HighTop	February 17, 2015	May 3, 2015
Jo Dong-hyuk	February 17, 2015	June 7, 2015
Han Sang-jin	April 27, 2015	May 17, 2015
Julien Kang	April 27, 2015	February 7, 2016
Sungjong	June 8, 2015	July 26, 2015
Don Spike	June 8, 2015	February 14, 2016
Baro	July 20, 2015	August 23, 2015
DinDin	September 21, 2015	February 14, 2016
Lee Ki-woo	September 21, 2015	February 14, 2016
Lee Yi-kyung	September 21, 2015	November 29, 2015
Kim Dong-jun	September 21, 2015	February 7, 2016
Lee Sung-bae	September 21, 2015	February 7, 2016

==== Middle-age special ====
Member	Debut date	End date
Jo Min-ki	February 2, 2016	May 15, 2016
Lee Dong-joon	February 2, 2016	May 15, 2016
Kim Min-kyo	February 2, 2016	May 15, 2016
Bae Soo-bin	February 2, 2016	May 15, 2016
Mino	February 2, 2016	May 15, 2016
Seok Joo-il	February 2, 2016	May 15, 2016

==== Friendly enlisting special ====
Member	Debut date	End date
Jo Jae-yoon	May 2, 2016	July 10, 2016
Ryu Seung-soo	May 2, 2016	July 10, 2016
Woo Ji-won	May 2, 2016	July 10, 2016
Jackson Wang	May 2, 2016	July 10, 2016
BamBam	May 2, 2016	July 10, 2016
Park Chan-ho	May 2, 2016	July 10, 2016
Lee Sang-ho	May 2, 2016	July 10, 2016
Lee Sang-min	May 2, 2016	July 10, 2016

==== Comedian special ====
Member	Debut date	End date
Kim Young-chul	February 10, 2015	August 14, 2016
Yoon Jung-soo	February 2, 2016	August 14, 2016
Moon Se-yoon	June 20, 2016	August 14, 2016
Yang Se-chan	June 20, 2016	August 14, 2016
Lee Jin-ho	June 20, 2016	August 14, 2016
Hwang Je-sung	June 20, 2016	August 14, 2016
Kim Kiri	June 20, 2016	August 14, 2016
Heo Kyung-hwan	June 20, 2016	August 14, 2016

==== Navy NCO special ====
Member	Debut date	End date
Park Chan-ho	May 2, 2016	October 16, 2016
Kim Jung-tae	July 25, 2016	October 16, 2016
Lee Tae-sung	July 25, 2016	October 16, 2016
Yang Sang-guk	July 25, 2016	October 16, 2016
Parc Jae-jung	July 25, 2016	October 16, 2016
Julian Quintart	July 25, 2016	October 16, 2016

==== Manly Men special ====
Member	Debut date	End date
Sleepy	February 10, 2015	November 27, 2016
Heo Kyung-hwan	September 21, 2015	November 27, 2016
Shim Hyung-tak	September 27, 2016	November 27, 2016
Lee Si-eon	September 27, 2016	November 27, 2016
Sung Hyuk	September 27, 2016	November 27, 2016
Jota	September 27, 2016	November 27, 2016
Yoon Hyung-bin	September 27, 2016	November 27, 2016
Kim Bo-sung	September 27, 2016	November 27, 2016

== Female cast members ==
=== Season 1 ===
==== Edition 1 ====
Member	Debut date	End date
Ra Mi-ran	August 24, 2014	September 21, 2014
Hong Eun-hee	August 24, 2014	September 21, 2014
Kim So-yeon	August 24, 2014	September 21, 2014
G.NA	August 24, 2014	September 21, 2014
Maeng Seung-ji	August 24, 2014	September 21, 2014
Lee Hye-ri	August 24, 2014	September 21, 2014
Park Seung-hi	August 24, 2014	September 21, 2014

==== Edition 2 ====
Member	Debut date	End date
Kim Ji-young	January 18, 2015	March 8, 2015
Kang Ye-won	January 18, 2015	March 8, 2015
Lee Ji-ae	January 18, 2015	March 8, 2015
Lee Da-hee	January 18, 2015	March 8, 2015
Ahn Young-mi	January 18, 2015	March 8, 2015
Park Ha-sun	January 18, 2015	March 8, 2015
Amber Liu	January 18, 2015	March 8, 2015
Yoon Bo-mi	January 18, 2015	March 8, 2015

=== Season 2 ===
==== Edition 3 ====
Member	Debut date	End date
Jessi	August 19, 2015	October 11, 2015
Yujin	August 19, 2015	October 11, 2015
Sayuri Fujita	August 19, 2015	October 11, 2015
Shin So-yul	August 19, 2015	October 11, 2015
Yoo Sun	August 19, 2015	October 25, 2015
Han Groo	August 19, 2015	October 25, 2015
Han Chae-ah	August 19, 2015	October 25, 2015
Kim Hyun-sook	August 19, 2015	October 25, 2015
Jeon Mi-ra	August 19, 2015	October 25, 2015
Park Gyu-ri	August 19, 2015	October 25, 2015

==== Edition 4 ====
Member	Debut date	End date
Cao Lu	February 16, 2016	April 10, 2016
Dahyun	February 16, 2016	April 10, 2016
Nana	February 16, 2016	April 10, 2016
Jun Hyo-seong	February 16, 2016	April 10, 2016
Kim Sung-eun	February 16, 2016	April 10, 2016
Kim Young-hee	February 16, 2016	April 10, 2016
Lee Chae-young	February 16, 2016	April 10, 2016
Gong Hyun-joo	February 16, 2016	April 10, 2016

==== Navy NCO special ====
Member	Debut date	End date
Seo In-young	July 24, 2016	October 16, 2016
Lee Si-young	July 24, 2016	October 16, 2016
Solbi	July 24, 2016	October 16, 2016
Seo Ji-soo	July 24, 2016	October 16, 2016

== Episodes ==
Episode #	Broadcast date	Title	Members	Special appearance(s)
1	2015/01/10	White Horse Army Base (백마부대) (Filmed on March 25–30, 2013)	Kim Soo-ro, Seo Kyung-suk, Sam Hammington, Mir, Ryu Soo-young, Son Jin-young	Wheesung
2	2015/01/11	White Horse Army Base (백마부대) (Filmed on March 25–30, 2013)	Kim Soo-ro, Seo Kyung-suk, Sam Hammington, Mir, Ryu Soo-young, Son Jin-young	
3	April 28, 2013	White Horse Army Base (백마부대) (Filmed on March 25–30, 2013)	Kim Soo-ro, Seo Kyung-suk, Sam Hammington, Mir, Ryu Soo-young, Son Jin-young	
4	May 5, 2013	White Horse Army Base (백마부대) (Filmed on March 25–30, 2013)	Kim Soo-ro, Seo Kyung-suk, Sam Hammington, Mir, Ryu Soo-young, Son Jin-young	
5	May 12, 2013	Hwaryong Army Base (화룡부대) (Filmed on April 23–28, 2013)	Kim Soo-ro, Seo Kyung-suk, Sam Hammington, Mir, Ryu Soo-young, Son Jin-young	
6	May 19, 2013	Hwaryong Army Base (화룡부대) (Filmed on April 23–28, 2013)	Kim Soo-ro, Seo Kyung-suk, Sam Hammington, Mir, Ryu Soo-young, Son Jin-young	
7	May 26, 2013	Hwaryong Army Base (화룡부대) (Filmed on April 23–28, 2013)	Kim Soo-ro, Seo Kyung-suk, Sam Hammington, Mir, Ryu Soo-young, Son Jin-young	
8	June 2, 2013	Hwaryong Army Base (화룡부대) (Filmed on April 23–28, 2013)	Kim Soo-ro, Seo Kyung-suk, Sam Hammington, Mir, Ryu Soo-young, Son Jin-young	Girl's Day
9	June 9, 2013	Steel Division, Sea Dragon Army Base (강철사단 해룡연대) (Filmed on May 27-June 1, 2013); New members: Jang Hyuk and Park Hyung-sik	Kim Soo-ro, Seo Kyung-suk, Sam Hammington, Mir, Ryu Soo-young, Son Jin-young, Jang Hyuk, Park Hyung-sik	
10	June 16, 2013	Steel Division, Sea Dragon Army Base (강철사단 해룡연대) (Filmed on May 27-June 1, 2013); New members: Jang Hyuk and Park Hyung-sik	Kim Soo-ro, Seo Kyung-suk, Sam Hammington, Ryu Soo-young, Son Jin-young, Jang Hyuk, Park Hyung-sik	
11	June 23, 2013	Steel Division, Sea Dragon Army Base (강철사단 해룡연대) (Filmed on May 27-June 1, 2013); New members: Jang Hyuk and Park Hyung-sik	Kim Soo-ro, Seo Kyung-suk, Sam Hammington, Ryu Soo-young, Son Jin-young, Jang Hyuk, Park Hyung-sik	
12 (Note: 5 Original members got 'Pfc.' ranks)	June 30, 2013	Steel Division, Sea Dragon Army Base (강철사단 해룡연대) (Filmed on May 27-June 1, 2013); New members: Jang Hyuk and Park Hyung-sik	Kim Soo-ro, Seo Kyung-suk, Sam Hammington, Ryu Soo-young, Son Jin-young, Jang Hyuk, Park Hyung-sik	2Eyes
13	July 7, 2013	Cheongryong Army Base (청룡대대) (Filmed on June 25–29, 2013)	Kim Soo-ro, Seo Kyung-suk, Sam Hammington, Ryu Soo-young, Son Jin-young, Jang Hyuk, Park Hyung-sik	
14	July 14, 2013	Cheongryong Army Base (청룡대대) (Filmed on June 25–29, 2013)	Kim Soo-ro, Seo Kyung-suk, Sam Hammington, Ryu Soo-young, Son Jin-young, Jang Hyuk, Park Hyung-sik	
15	July 21, 2013	Cheongryong Army Base (청룡대대) (Filmed on June 25–29, 2013)	Kim Soo-ro, Seo Kyung-suk, Sam Hammington, Ryu Soo-young, Son Jin-young, Jang Hyuk, Park Hyung-sik	
16	July 28, 2013	Cheongryong Army Base (청룡대대) (Filmed on June 25–29, 2013)	Kim Soo-ro, Seo Kyung-suk, Sam Hammington, Ryu Soo-young, Son Jin-young, Jang Hyuk, Park Hyung-sik	Rainbow
17	August 4, 2013	Ikija 'We will win!' Army Base (이기자부대) (Filmed on June 25–29, 2013) (Kim Sooro removed from this army base because his shoulder is hurt)	Seo Kyung-suk, Sam Hammington, Ryu Soo-young, Son Jin-young, Jang Hyuk, Park Hyung-sik	
18	August 11, 2013	Ikija 'We will win!' Army Base (이기자부대) (Filmed on June 25–29, 2013) (Kim Sooro removed from this army base because his shoulder is hurt)	Seo Kyung-suk, Sam Hammington, Ryu Soo-young, Son Jin-young, Jang Hyuk, Park Hyung-sik	
19	August 18, 2013	Ikija 'We will win!' Army Base (이기자부대) (Filmed on June 25–29, 2013) (Kim Sooro removed from this army base because his shoulder is hurt)	Seo Kyung-suk, Sam Hammington, Ryu Soo-young, Son Jin-young, Jang Hyuk, Park Hyung-sik	
20	August 25, 2013	Ikija 'We will win!' Army Base (이기자부대) (Filmed on June 25–29, 2013) (Kim Sooro removed from this army base because his shoulder is hurt)	Seo Kyung-suk, Sam Hammington, Ryu Soo-young, Son Jin-young, Jang Hyuk, Park Hyung-sik	
21	September 1, 2013	Ikija 'We will win!' Army Base (이기자부대) (Filmed on June 25–29, 2013) (Kim Sooro removed from this army base because his shoulder is hurt)	Seo Kyung-suk, Sam Hammington, Ryu Soo-young, Son Jin-young, Jang Hyuk, Park Hyung-sik	
22	September 8, 2013	Ikija 'We will win!' Army Base (이기자부대) (Filmed on June 25–29, 2013) (Kim Sooro removed from this army base because his shoulder is hurt)	Seo Kyung-suk, Sam Hammington, Ryu Soo-young, Son Jin-young, Jang Hyuk, Park Hyung-sik	Sistar, Kim Tae-woo
23	September 15, 2013	Military Police (수도방위사령부) (Filmed on June 25–29, 2013) (Kim Sooro joins 'Real Man' again, Ryu Sooyoung didn't participate ep. 25-27)	Kim Soo-ro, Seo Kyung-suk, Sam Hammington, Ryu Soo-young, Son Jin-young, Jang Hyuk, Park Hyung-sik	
24	September 22, 2013	Military Police (수도방위사령부) (Filmed on June 25–29, 2013) (Kim Sooro joins 'Real Man' again, Ryu Sooyoung didn't participate ep. 25-27)	Kim Soo-ro, Seo Kyung-suk, Sam Hammington, Ryu Soo-young, Son Jin-young, Jang Hyuk, Park Hyung-sik	
25	September 29, 2013	Military Police (수도방위사령부) (Filmed on June 25–29, 2013) (Kim Sooro joins 'Real Man' again, Ryu Sooyoung didn't participate ep. 25-27)	Kim Soo-ro, Seo Kyung-suk, Sam Hammington, Son Jin-young, Jang Hyuk, Park Hyung-sik	
26	October 6, 2013	Military Police (수도방위사령부) (Filmed on June 25–29, 2013) (Kim Sooro joins 'Real Man' again, Ryu Sooyoung didn't participate ep. 25-27)	Kim Soo-ro, Seo Kyung-suk, Sam Hammington, Son Jin-young, Jang Hyuk, Park Hyung-sik	
27	October 13, 2013	Military Police (수도방위사령부) (Filmed on June 25–29, 2013) (Kim Sooro joins 'Real Man' again, Ryu Sooyoung didn't participate ep. 25-27)	Kim Soo-ro, Seo Kyung-suk, Sam Hammington, Son Jin-young, Jang Hyuk, Park Hyung-sik	Apink
28	October 20, 2013	NAVY Part 1 (Filmed on October 8–9, 2013); 6 Days 5 Nights sailing to 'East Sea' and Dokdo |! 28 (Note: Training as Trainee Navy)	Kim Soo-ro, Seo Kyung-suk, Sam Hammington, Ryu Soo-young, Son Jin-young, Jang Hyuk, Park Hyung-sik	2Eyes, Park Eun-ji, Jung Joo-yeon
29 (Note: Training on 'sailing ships')	October 27, 2013	NAVY Part 1 (Filmed on October 8–9, 2013); 6 Days 5 Nights sailing to 'East Sea' and Dokdo |! 28	Kim Soo-ro, Seo Kyung-suk, Sam Hammington, Ryu Soo-young, Son Jin-young, Jang Hyuk, Park Hyung-sik	
30	November 3, 2013	NAVY Part 1 (Filmed on October 8–9, 2013); 6 Days 5 Nights sailing to 'East Sea' and Dokdo |! 28	Kim Soo-ro, Seo Kyung-suk, Sam Hammington, Ryu Soo-young, Son Jin-young, Jang Hyuk, Park Hyung-sik	
31	November 10, 2013	NAVY Part 1 (Filmed on October 8–9, 2013); 6 Days 5 Nights sailing to 'East Sea' and Dokdo |! 28	Kim Soo-ro, Seo Kyung-suk, Sam Hammington, Ryu Soo-young, Son Jin-young, Jang Hyuk, Park Hyung-sik	
32	November 17, 2013	NAVY Part 1 (Filmed on October 8–9, 2013); 6 Days 5 Nights sailing to 'East Sea' and Dokdo |! 28	Kim Soo-ro, Seo Kyung-suk, Sam Hammington, Ryu Soo-young, Son Jin-young, Jang Hyuk, Park Hyung-sik	
33	November 17, 2013	NAVY Part 2 (Filmed on November 12–18, 2013); 7 Days 6 Nights sailing around 'Pyeongtaek' and NLL (Northern Limit Line)	Kim Soo-ro, Seo Kyung-suk, Sam Hammington, Ryu Soo-young, Son Jin-young, Jang Hyuk, Park Hyung-sik	
34	December 1, 2013	NAVY Part 2 (Filmed on November 12–18, 2013); 7 Days 6 Nights sailing around 'Pyeongtaek' and NLL (Northern Limit Line)	Kim Soo-ro, Seo Kyung-suk, Sam Hammington, Ryu Soo-young, Son Jin-young, Jang Hyuk, Park Hyung-sik	
35	December 8, 2013	NAVY Part 2 (Filmed on November 12–18, 2013); 7 Days 6 Nights sailing around 'Pyeongtaek' and NLL (Northern Limit Line)	Kim Soo-ro, Seo Kyung-suk, Sam Hammington, Ryu Soo-young, Son Jin-young, Jang Hyuk, Park Hyung-sik	
36 (Note: Cooking competition and go to GOP)	December 15, 2013	NAVY Part 2 (Filmed on November 12–18, 2013); 7 Days 6 Nights sailing around 'Pyeongtaek' and NLL (Northern Limit Line)	Kim Soo-ro, Seo Kyung-suk, Sam Hammington, Ryu Soo-young, Son Jin-young, Jang Hyuk, Park Hyung-sik	
37	December 22, 2013	Baekgol Army Base (백골부대) (Filmed December 10–14, 2013) coldest base in Korea, and visit GOP(General out-post)	Kim Soo-ro, Seo Kyung-suk, Sam Hammington, Ryu Soo-young, Son Jin-young, Jang Hyuk, Park Hyung-sik	
38 (Note: Christmas special) (Note: All the soldiers who have helped 'Real Man' members during the first six bases)	December 29, 2013	Baekgol Army Base (백골부대) (Filmed December 10–14, 2013) coldest base in Korea, and visit GOP(General out-post)	Kim Soo-ro, Seo Kyung-suk, Sam Hammington, Ryu Soo-young, Son Jin-young, Jang Hyuk, Park Hyung-sik	Sistar, Miss A
39	January 5, 2014	Baekgol Army Base (백골부대) (Filmed December 10–14, 2013) coldest base in Korea, and visit GOP(General out-post)	Kim Soo-ro, Seo Kyung-suk, Sam Hammington, Ryu Soo-young, Son Jin-young, Jang Hyuk, Park Hyung-sik	Dal Shabet
40	January 12, 2014	Baekgol Army Base (백골부대) (Filmed December 10–14, 2013) coldest base in Korea, and visit GOP(General out-post)	Kim Soo-ro, Seo Kyung-suk, Sam Hammington, Ryu Soo-young, Son Jin-young, Jang Hyuk, Park Hyung-sik	
41	January 19, 2014	Baekgol Army Base (백골부대) (Filmed December 10–14, 2013) coldest base in Korea, and visit GOP(General out-post)	Kim Soo-ro, Seo Kyung-suk, Sam Hammington, Ryu Soo-young, Son Jin-young, Jang Hyuk, Park Hyung-sik	
42	January 26, 2014	Beonkae Army Base (번개부대) 'South Korea and USA Army Special Warfare Command' (Filmed on January 14–18, 2014); Janghyuk, Ryu Sooyoung, and Son Jinyoung's last episode	Kim Soo-ro, Seo Kyung-suk, Sam Hammington, Ryu Soo-young, Son Jin-young, Jang Hyuk, Park Hyung-sik	
43	February 2, 2014	Beonkae Army Base (번개부대) 'South Korea and USA Army Special Warfare Command' (Filmed on January 14–18, 2014); Janghyuk, Ryu Sooyoung, and Son Jinyoung's last episode	Kim Soo-ro, Seo Kyung-suk, Sam Hammington, Ryu Soo-young, Son Jin-young, Jang Hyuk, Park Hyung-sik	Ailee
44	February 9, 2014	Beonkae Army Base (번개부대) 'South Korea and USA Army Special Warfare Command' (Filmed on January 14–18, 2014); Janghyuk, Ryu Sooyoung, and Son Jinyoung's last episode	Kim Soo-ro, Seo Kyung-suk, Sam Hammington, Ryu Soo-young, Son Jin-young, Jang Hyuk, Park Hyung-sik	
86	December 28, 2014	Sergeants' Holiday Special		
104	May 3, 2015	Sea Salvage & Rescue Unit (해군 해난구조대)		
105	May 10, 2015	Sea Salvage & Rescue Unit (해군 해난구조대)		
106	May 17, 2015	Sea Salvage & Rescue Unit (해군 해난구조대)		
107	May 24, 2015	Sea Salvage & Rescue Unit (해군 해난구조대)		
108	May 31, 2015	Sea Salvage & Rescue Unit (해군 해난구조대)		
109	June 7, 2015	Sea Salvage & Rescue Unit (해군 해난구조대)		
110	June 14, 2015	Sea Salvage & Rescue Unit (해군 해난구조대)		
111	June 21, 2015			
112	June 28, 2015	2nd Infantry Division (제2보병사단 '노도부대')		
113	July 5, 2015	2nd Infantry Division (제2보병사단 '노도부대')		
114	July 12, 2015	2nd Infantry Division (제2보병사단 '노도부대')		
115	July 19, 2015	2nd Infantry Division (제2보병사단 '노도부대')		
116	July 26, 2015	2nd Infantry Division (제2보병사단 '노도부대')		EXID
117	August 2, 2015	50th Infantry Division (제50보병사단 '강철사단')		
118	August 9, 2015	50th Infantry Division (제50보병사단 '강철사단')		
119	August 16, 2015	50th Infantry Division (제50보병사단 '강철사단')		
120		The Tarantula Unit (제35특공대대) NCO Female Army Edition 3		
121		The Tarantula Unit (제35특공대대) NCO Female Army Edition 3		
122		The Tarantula Unit (제35특공대대) NCO Female Army Edition 3		
123		The Tarantula Unit (제35특공대대) NCO Female Army Edition 3		
124		The Tarantula Unit (제35특공대대) NCO Female Army Edition 3		
125		The Tarantula Unit (제35특공대대) NCO Female Army Edition 3		
126		The Tarantula Unit (제35특공대대) NCO Female Army Edition 3		
127		The Tarantula Unit (제35특공대대) NCO Female Army Edition 3		
128		The Tarantula Unit (제35특공대대) NCO Female Army Edition 3		
129		The Tarantula Unit (제35특공대대) NCO Female Army Edition 3		
130		The Tarantula Unit (제35특공대대) NCO Female Army Edition 3		
131		The Tarantula Unit (제35특공대대) NCO Female Army Edition 3		
137	December 27, 2015	Marines Special 2: Force Recon Battalion & Mountain Recon Battalion	Kim Dong-jun, DinDin, Julien Kang, Heo Kyung-hwan, Sleepy, Sam Okyere, Lee Ki-woo, Lee Sung-bae	
138	January 03, 2016	Marines Special 2: Force Recon Battalion & Mountain Recon Battalion	Kim Dong-jun, DinDin, Julien Kang, Heo Kyung-hwan, Sleepy, Sam Okyere, Lee Ki-woo, Lee Sung-bae	
139	January 10, 2016	Marines Special 2: Force Recon Battalion & Mountain Recon Battalion	Kim Dong-jun, DinDin, Julien Kang, Heo Kyung-hwan, Sleepy, Sam Okyere, Lee Ki-woo, Lee Sung-bae	
140	January 17, 2016	Marines Special 2: Force Recon Battalion & Mountain Recon Battalion	Kim Dong-jun, DinDin, Julien Kang, Heo Kyung-hwan, Sleepy, Sam Okyere, Lee Ki-woo, Lee Sung-bae	
141	January 24, 2016	Marines Special 2: Force Recon Battalion & Mountain Recon Battalion	Kim Dong-jun, DinDin, Julien Kang, Heo Kyung-hwan, Sleepy, Sam Okyere, Lee Ki-woo, Lee Sung-bae	
142	January 31, 2016	Marines Special 2: Force Recon Battalion & Mountain Recon Battalion	Kim Dong-jun, DinDin, Julien Kang, Heo Kyung-hwan, Sleepy, Sam Okyere, Lee Ki-woo, Lee Sung-bae	
143	February 7, 2016	Marines Special 2: Force Recon Battalion & Mountain Recon Battalion	Kim Dong-jun, DinDin, Julien Kang, Heo Kyung-hwan, Sleepy, Sam Okyere, Lee Ki-woo, Lee Sung-bae	
144	February 14, 2016	Marines Special 2: Force Recon Battalion & Mountain Recon Battalion	Kim Dong-jun, DinDin, Julien Kang, Heo Kyung-hwan, Sleepy, Sam Okyere, Lee Ki-woo, Lee Sung-bae	GFriend, Jessi
145 (Note: Cooking Contest)	February 21, 2016	Special Army Cooking Contest	Kim Young-chul, Don Spike, Im Won-hee, Jung Gyu-woon, Sleepy, DinDin, Lee Ki-woo, Heo Kyung-hwan	
146	February 28, 2016	Medical NCO; Female Army Edition 4	Cao Lu, Dahyun, Nana, Jun Hyo-seong, Kim Sung-eun, Kim Young-hee, Lee Chae-young, Gong Hyun-joo	Yoo In-na
147	March 6, 2016	Medical NCO; Female Army Edition 4	Cao Lu, Dahyun, Nana, Jun Hyo-seong, Kim Sung-eun, Kim Young-hee, Lee Chae-young, Gong Hyun-joo	Lee Sang-yeob
148	March 13, 2016	Medical NCO; Female Army Edition 4	Cao Lu, Dahyun, Nana, Jun Hyo-seong, Kim Sung-eun, Kim Young-hee, Lee Chae-young, Gong Hyun-joo	
149	March 20, 2016	Medical NCO; Female Army Edition 4	Cao Lu, Dahyun, Nana, Jun Hyo-seong, Kim Sung-eun, Kim Young-hee, Lee Chae-young, Gong Hyun-joo	
150	March 27, 2016	Medical NCO; Female Army Edition 4	Cao Lu, Dahyun, Nana, Jun Hyo-seong, Kim Sung-eun, Kim Young-hee, Lee Chae-young, Gong Hyun-joo	
151	April 3, 2016	Medical NCO; Female Army Edition 4	Cao Lu, Dahyun, Nana, Jun Hyo-seong, Kim Sung-eun, Kim Young-hee, Lee Chae-young, Gong Hyun-joo	
152	April 10, 2016	Medical NCO; Female Army Edition 4	Cao Lu, Dahyun, Nana, Jun Hyo-seong, Kim Sung-eun, Kim Young-hee, Lee Chae-young, Gong Hyun-joo	
159	May 23, 2016	6th Infantry Division 'BLUE STAR' (6보병사단 '청성부대') (Battle Buddy Special)	Jo Jae-yoon, Ryu Seung-soo, Park Chan-ho, Woo Ji-won, Got7 (Jackson Wang, BamBam), Lee Sang-ho, Lee Sang-min	
160	May 30, 2016	6th Infantry Division 'BLUE STAR' (6보병사단 '청성부대') (Battle Buddy Special)	Jo Jae-yoon, Ryu Seung-soo, Park Chan-ho, Woo Ji-won, Got7 (Jackson Wang, BamBam), Lee Sang-ho, Lee Sang-min	
161	June 5, 2016	6th Infantry Division 'BLUE STAR' (6보병사단 '청성부대') (Battle Buddy Special)	Jo Jae-yoon, Ryu Seung-soo, Park Chan-ho, Woo Ji-won, Got7 (Jackson Wang, BamBam), Lee Sang-ho, Lee Sang-min	
162	June 12, 2016	6th Infantry Division 'BLUE STAR' (6보병사단 '청성부대') (Battle Buddy Special)	Jo Jae-yoon, Ryu Seung-soo, Park Chan-ho, Woo Ji-won, Got7 (Jackson Wang, BamBam), Lee Sang-ho, Lee Sang-min	
163	June 19, 2016	6th Infantry Division 'BLUE STAR' (6보병사단 '청성부대') (Battle Buddy Special)	Jo Jae-yoon, Ryu Seung-soo, Park Chan-ho, Woo Ji-won, Got7 (Jackson Wang, BamBam), Lee Sang-ho, Lee Sang-min	
164	June 26, 2016	6th Infantry Division 'BLUE STAR' (6보병사단 '청성부대') (Battle Buddy Special)	Jo Jae-yoon, Ryu Seung-soo, Park Chan-ho, Woo Ji-won, Got7 (Jackson Wang, BamBam), Lee Sang-ho, Lee Sang-min	
165	July 04, 2016	6th Infantry Division 'BLUE STAR' (6보병사단 '청성부대') (Battle Buddy Special)	Jo Jae-yoon, Ryu Seung-soo, Park Chan-ho, Woo Ji-won, Got7 (Jackson Wang, BamBam), Lee Sang-ho, Lee Sang-min	
166	July 11, 2016	6th Infantry Division 'BLUE STAR' (6보병사단 '청성부대') (Battle Buddy Special)	Jo Jae-yoon, Ryu Seung-soo, Park Chan-ho, Woo Ji-won, Got7 (Jackson Wang, BamBam), Lee Sang-ho, Lee Sang-min	Lovelyz
172	August 14, 2016	Naval Education and Training Command (해군 교육 사령부) Navy NCO Special First Male & Female Joint Enlistment	Seo In-young, Lee Si-young, Solbi, Seo Ji-soo, Park Chan-ho, Kim Jung-tae, Lee Tae-sung, Yang Sang-guk, Parc Jae-jung, Julian Quintart	
173	August 21, 2016	Naval Education and Training Command (해군 교육 사령부) Navy NCO Special First Male & Female Joint Enlistment	Seo In-young, Lee Si-young, Solbi, Seo Ji-soo, Park Chan-ho, Kim Jung-tae, Lee Tae-sung, Yang Sang-guk, Parc Jae-jung, Julian Quintart	
174	August 28, 2016	Naval Education and Training Command (해군 교육 사령부) Navy NCO Special First Male & Female Joint Enlistment	Seo In-young, Lee Si-young, Solbi, Seo Ji-soo, Park Chan-ho, Kim Jung-tae, Lee Tae-sung, Yang Sang-guk, Parc Jae-jung, Julian Quintart	
175	September 4, 2016	Naval Education and Training Command (해군 교육 사령부) Navy NCO Special First Male & Female Joint Enlistment	Seo In-young, Lee Si-young, Solbi, Seo Ji-soo, Park Chan-ho, Kim Jung-tae, Lee Tae-sung, Yang Sang-guk, Parc Jae-jung, Julian Quintart	
176	September 11, 2016	Naval Education and Training Command (해군 교육 사령부) Navy NCO Special First Male & Female Joint Enlistment	Seo In-young, Lee Si-young, Solbi, Seo Ji-soo, Park Chan-ho, Kim Jung-tae, Lee Tae-sung, Yang Sang-guk, Parc Jae-jung, Julian Quintart	
177	September 18, 2016	Naval Education and Training Command (해군 교육 사령부) Navy NCO Special First Male & Female Joint Enlistment	Seo In-young, Lee Si-young, Solbi, Seo Ji-soo, Park Chan-ho, Kim Jung-tae, Lee Tae-sung, Yang Sang-guk, Parc Jae-jung, Julian Quintart	
178	September 25, 2016	Naval Education and Training Command (해군 교육 사령부) Navy NCO Special First Male & Female Joint Enlistment	Seo In-young, Lee Si-young, Solbi, Seo Ji-soo, Park Chan-ho, Kim Jung-tae, Lee Tae-sung, Yang Sang-guk, Parc Jae-jung, Julian Quintart	
179	October 2, 2016	Naval Education and Training Command (해군 교육 사령부) Navy NCO Special First Male & Female Joint Enlistment	Seo In-young, Lee Si-young, Solbi, Seo Ji-soo, Park Chan-ho, Kim Jung-tae, Lee Tae-sung, Yang Sang-guk, Parc Jae-jung, Julian Quintart	
180	October 9, 2016	Naval Education and Training Command (해군 교육 사령부) Navy NCO Special First Male & Female Joint Enlistment	Seo In-young, Lee Si-young, Solbi, Seo Ji-soo, Park Chan-ho, Kim Jung-tae, Lee Tae-sung, Yang Sang-guk, Parc Jae-jung, Julian Quintart	
181	October 23, 2016	Award Winning Man (상남자 특집) Tough Guy Special	Shim Hyung-tak, Lee Si-eon, Yoon Hyung-Bin, Sung Hyuk, Jota (singer)	
182	October 30, 2016	Award Winning Man (상남자 특집) Tough Guy Special	Shim Hyung-tak, Lee Si-eon, Yoon Hyung-Bin, Sung Hyuk, Jota (singer)	
183	November 6, 2016	Award Winning Man (상남자 특집) Tough Guy Special	Shim Hyung-tak, Lee Si-eon, Yoon Hyung-Bin, Sung Hyuk, Jota (singer)	
184	November 13, 2016	Award Winning Man (상남자 특집) Tough Guy Special	Shim Hyung-tak, Lee Si-eon, Yoon Hyung-Bin, Sung Hyuk, Jota (singer)	
185	November 20, 2016	Award Winning Man (상남자 특집) Tough Guy Special	Shim Hyung-tak, Lee Si-eon, Yoon Hyung-Bin, Sung Hyuk, Jota (singer)	
186	November 27, 2016	Award Winning Man (상남자 특집) Tough Guy Special	Shim Hyung-tak, Lee Si-eon, Yoon Hyung-Bin, Sung Hyuk, Jota (singer)	

== Awards and nominations ==
Year	Award	Category	Recipient	Result
2013	MBC Entertainment Awards	Best Male Newcomer	Park Hyung-sik	Won
2013	MBC Entertainment Awards	Best Male Newcomer	Sam Hammington	Won
2013	MBC Entertainment Awards	Not Great at Much Award	Sam Hammington	Won
2013	MBC Entertainment Awards	Popularity Award	Jang Hyuk	Won
2013	MBC Entertainment Awards	Popularity Award – MC	Seo Kyung-seok	Won
2013	MBC Entertainment Awards	PD Award	Seo Kyung-seok	Won
2013	MBC Entertainment Awards	Scriptwriter Award	Shin Myung-ji	Won
2013	MBC Entertainment Awards	Star of the Year	Ryu Soo-young	Won
2013	MBC Entertainment Awards	Star of the Year	Son Jin-young	Won
2013	MBC Entertainment Awards	Top Excellence Award	Kim Soo-ro	Won
2013	MBC Entertainment Awards	Excellence Award	Kim Soo-ro	Nominated
2014	MBC Entertainment Awards	Excellence Award	Park Gun-hyung	Won
2014	MBC Entertainment Awards	Excellence Award	Seo Kyung-seok	Won
2014	MBC Entertainment Awards	Top Excellence Award	Seo Kyung-seok	Won
2014	MBC Entertainment Awards	Popularity Award – MC	Seo Kyung-seok	Won
2014	MBC Entertainment Awards	Friendship Award	Seo Kyung-seok	Won
2014	MBC Entertainment Awards	Friendship Award	Sam Hammington	Won
2014	MBC Entertainment Awards	Friendship Award	Kim Soo-ro	Won
2014	MBC Entertainment Awards	Top Excellence Award	Kim Soo-ro	Nominated
2014	MBC Entertainment Awards	Grand Prize (Daesang)	Kim Soo-ro	Nominated
2014	MBC Entertainment Awards	Best Male Newcomer	Henry Lau	Won
2014	MBC Entertainment Awards	Star of the Year	Ryu Soo-young	Won
2014	MBC Entertainment Awards	Star of the Year	Son Jin-young	Won
2014	MBC Entertainment Awards	New Star Award	Im Hyung-joon	Won
2014	MBC Entertainment Awards	Special Award	Hong Eun-hee	Won
2014	MBC Entertainment Awards	Excellence Award	Ra Mi-ran	Won
2014	MBC Entertainment Awards	Best Female Newcomer	Lee Hyeri	Won
2015	51st Baeksang Arts Awards	Best Female Variety Performer	Ahn Young-mi	Nominated
2015	MBC Entertainment Awards	Best Female Newcomer	Jessi	Nominated
2015	MBC Entertainment Awards	Best Female Newcomer	Amber	Won
2015	MBC Entertainment Awards	Best Male Newcomer	Sleepy	Won
2015	MBC Entertainment Awards	Best Teamwork Award	Real Man Season 2 - Female Edition 3	Won
2015	MBC Entertainment Awards	Best Couple Award	Kim Young-chul and Jung Gyu-woon	Nominated
2015	MBC Entertainment Awards	Special Award	Jeon Mi-ra	Won
2015	MBC Entertainment Awards	Female Excellence Award - Variety Show	Jeon Mi-ra	Nominated
2015	MBC Entertainment Awards	Female Excellence Award - Variety Show	Sayuri	Nominated
2015	MBC Entertainment Awards	Female Excellence Award - Variety Show	Kim Hyun-sook	Won
2015	MBC Entertainment Awards	Male Excellence Award - Variety Show	Jung Gyu-woon	Won
2015	MBC Entertainment Awards	Popularity Award - Variety Show	Kang Ye-won	Won
2015	MBC Entertainment Awards	Top Female Excellence Award - Variety Show	Kang Ye-won	Nominated
2015	MBC Entertainment Awards	Top Female Excellence Award - Variety Show	Ahn Young-mi	Nominated
2015	MBC Entertainment Awards	Top Female Excellence Award - Variety Show	Lee Da-hee	Nominated
2015	MBC Entertainment Awards	Top Female Excellence Award - Variety Show	Han Chae-ah	Won
2015	MBC Entertainment Awards	People's Choice - Best Entertainment Program	Real Man Season 2	Nominated
2015	MBC Entertainment Awards	Top Male Excellence Award - Variety Show	Im Won-hee	Nominated
2015	MBC Entertainment Awards	Top Male Excellence Award - Variety Show	Kim Young-chul	Won
2015	MBC Entertainment Awards	Grand Prize (Daesang)	Kim Young-chul	Nominated
2016	52nd Baeksang Arts Awards	Best Male Variety Performer	Kim Young-chul	Nominated
2016	16th MBC Entertainment Awards	Scriptwriter of the Year	Lee Hae-young	Won
2016	16th MBC Entertainment Awards	Top Female Excellence Award in Variety Show	Seo In-young	Nominated
2016	16th MBC Entertainment Awards	Male Excellence Award in Variety Show	Heo Kyung-hwan	Won
2016	16th MBC Entertainment Awards	Male Rookie Award in Variety Show	Park Chan-ho	Won
2016	16th MBC Entertainment Awards	Male Rookie Award in Variety Show	Lee Si-eon	Nominated
2016	16th MBC Entertainment Awards	Male Rookie Award in Variety Show	Jackson Wang	Nominated
2016	16th MBC Entertainment Awards	Female Rookie Award in Variety Show	Lee Si-young	Won
