= Ahn Jae-wook =

South Korean actor and singer (born 1971)

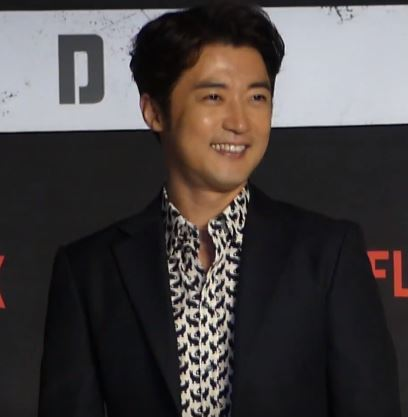
- Ahn in April 2018
- Born: October 30, 1971 (age 55); Donam-dong, Seongbuk District, Seoul, South Korea
- Education: Seoul Institute of the Arts – Theater (1994); Yonsei University Graduate School of Public Administration – Social Welfare
- Occupations: Actor, singer
- Years active: 1994–present
- Agents: EA&C; Universal D
- Spouse: Choi Hyun-joo (m. 2015)
- Children: 2

Korean name
- Hangul: 안재욱
- RR: An Jaeuk
- MR: An Chaeuk
- Website: ahnjaewook.co.kr

Ahn Jae-wook (Korean: 안재욱; born October 30, 1971) is a South Korean actor and singer.

== Career ==
Ahn Jae-wook spent most of his childhood in his hometown, the district of Donam-dong in Seoul, before graduating from Seoul Institute of the Arts, where he majored in theater. After graduating in 1994, Ahn made his acting debut in Song of a Blind Bird, which was based on a real-life story, followed by supporting roles in several 1995–96 television series such as Hotel and Their Embrace. In 1997 he and costar Choi Jin-sil shot to stardom in the highly popular trendy drama Star in My Heart, which reached ratings of over 49%. It not only ignited trends in hairstyle, fashion and products featured in the series, Ahn also became a Korean Wave star, extending his popularity to China, Japan and Southeast Asian countries.

Star in My Heart likewise kick-started Ahn's music career. Forever, which was featured in the series' ending during the concert of his character Kang Min, sold over 700,000 copies, and became the title song of his debut album.

Instead, Ahn focused on the small screen, appearing in over 10 television series from the late 1990s and throughout the 2000s. Among these were Goodbye My Love with Kim Hee-sun, Oh Pil-seung and Bong Soon-young (also known as Oh Feel Young) with Chae Rim, and I Love You (also known as Saranghae) with Seo Ji-hye.

As he entered his forties and his matinee idol status gave way to younger actors, Ahn returned to his stage roots. He played Daniel in Jack the Ripper (a Korean adaptation of the Czech musical Jack Rozparovač) from 2009 to 2011, then reprised the role in the musical's run in Tokyo, Japan in 2012.

To commemorate the 50th anniversary of broadcaster MBC, Ahn headlined Lights and Shadows in 2011. The sprawling drama, which spotlights Korean show business against the backdrop of history in the 1960s to the 1980s, was number one in its timeslot for 20 consecutive weeks.

Ahn then played the title role in the 2012 Korean staging of Rudolf, a musical about the 1889 Mayerling Incident involving the Crown Prince of Austria.

In February 2013 Ahn underwent brain surgery in the U.S. for a subarachnoid hemorrhage. After resting for a year, Ahn returned to work in April 2014 via the musical Le Roi Soleil. He celebrated his 20th anniversary in entertainment by holding a concert titled One Fine Day in October 2014.

In September 2017, It was confirmed that Ahn will be a fixed cast member in Netflix's variety show Busted!. Ahn's involvement in a drunk driving incident in February 2019 caused him to be omitted in the promotions of Busted's second season - including removal from the opening credits and promotional posters, as well as to skip the already-scheduled musical "Hero".

== Personal life ==
Ahn married musical theatre actress Choi Hyun-joo on June 1, 2015. The couple met in 2014 when they were cast as lovers in the stage musical Rudolf. The couple have a daughter and a son.

== Filmography ==
=== Television series ===
Year	Title	Role	Notes
1994	Traveler in Heaven		
1994	Song of a Blind Bird	Kang Young Woo	
1994–1997	Partner	Oh Min Soo	
1995	Make A Song		
1995	Hotel	Yeong Pal	
1995	Love and War		
1996	Their Embrace	Ji Yun Woo	
1996	Salted Mackerel	Sang Woo	
1997	Star in My Heart	Kang Min Hee	
1997–1998	Revenge and Passion	Kang Joon Ho	
1998–1999	Sunflower	Dr. Jang Hyun Woo	
1999	Goodbye My Love	Chang Min Soo	
2000	Bad Friends	Kim Kang Seok	
2000–2001	Mothers and Sisters	Kong Su Chul	
2003	The Fairy and The Swindler	Jung Jae Kyung	
2004	Match Made in Heaven	Kim Suk Koo	
2004	Oh Feel Young	Oh Pil Seung	
2006	Mr. Goodbye	Yoon Hyun Suh	
2008	I Love You	Suk Chul Soo	
2011–2012	Lights and Shadows	Kang Ki Tae	
2012	Faith	Eun Soo's ex-boyfriend	ep 1 cameo
2016	Five Enough	Lee Sang Tae	
2021	Mouse	Han Seo-joon	
2022	The Driver	Ha Tae-joon	
2022	The Empire	Na Geun-woo	
2023	Not Others	Jin-hong	
2025	For Eagle Brothers	Han Dong-seok	

=== Film ===
Year	Title	Role
1998	Rub Love	Jo Han
1998	Tie a Yellow Ribbon	Joon Hyuk
1998	First Kiss	Han Kyeong Hyeon
2003	Garden of Heaven	Choi Oh Sung
2009	Triangle	Ryu Sang Woo

=== Variety shows ===
Year	Title	Role	Notes
2017	Pot Stand	Host	
2018–2019	Busted!	Cast member	Season 1–2
2023	Oh Eun-young Game	Judge	

=== Radio program ===
- 2007–2008: Mr. Radio (KBS Cool FM)

== Theater ==
- 1995: Baby
- 1996: 한평 반짜리 혁명
- 1997: Butterflies Are Free
- 1998: Guys and Dolls
- 2009: Jack the Ripper
- 2010: Jack the Ripper
- 2010: Rock of Ages
- 2011: Jack the Ripper
- 2012: Jack the Ripper
- 2012–2013: Rudolf
- 2014: Le Roi Soleil
- 2014–2015: Rudolf
- 2022–2023: Dracula as Dracula
- 2023: Harlan County as John

== Discography ==
Album information	Track listing
Forever: 1st album; Released: April 24, 1997	Track listing: 1. Prologue; 2. Forever; 3. 아침 고은 햇살; 4. Don't go baby 5. 어둠 그리고 그림자; 6. 방황; 7. 널 보낸 지금; 8. Main The Piano Solo; 9. Forever (Bonus Track)
Memories: 2nd album; Released: April 17, 1998	Track listing: 1. 이별 (Good Bye); 2. 기댈 수 없는 세상 (Unreliable World); 3. 天愛擊兒 (천애지아) (Memories); 4. 가 (Go); 5. Only You; 6. Tears; 7. 그런게 아냐 (It's Not Like That); 8. 기약 (Promise); 9. 지금은 냉전중 (In Cold War); 10. 덫 (A Trap)
Yesterday: 3rd album; Released: November 1, 1999	Track listing: 1. Goodbye; 2. Yesterday; 3. Please don't go away 4. 인연 (Fate); 5. 너 없는 내일 (Tomorrow Without You); 6. 부탁 (Favor); 7. Baddest; 8. Illusion; 9. 나의 너에게 (Me To You); 10. Yesterday (Instrumental)
Reds in Ahn Jae-wook: 4th album; Released: March 17, 2003	Track listing: 1. Dear...; 2. Pain; 3. Friend; 4. 시작 (Start); 5. 벽 (Wall); 6. 수호천사 (Guardian Angel); 7. Blessing; 8. 배신 (Betrayal); 9. 넌 또다른 나 (Me Other Than You); 10. 모래시계 (Sand Glass); 11. 떠나지마 (Don't Leave); 12. Never Ever; 13. 변명 (Alias); 14. 자유 (Freedom)
사랑,이별 그리고...: Track from Garden of Heaven OST; Released: April 8, 2003	Track listing: 14. 사랑,이별 그리고... – Ahn Jae-wook
Sounds Like You: 5th album; Released: November 11, 2005	Track listing: 1. Scene No. 1 'They...'; 2. 혼잣말; 3. 두루루 (타이틀곡); 4. 너를 사랑하던; 5. 말해줘; 6. Scene No. 2 'Time that we spent' 7. 못잊어; 8. 반지; 9. 사랑은 아프다; 10. Her Smile(Instrumental); 11. 뒷모습; 12. 세상을 가진 것처럼...; 13. 바람; 14. 너를 닮아서
사랑의 향기는 설레임을 타고 온다: Track from All That Love; Released: March 2, 2006	Track listing: 12. 사랑의 향기는 설레임을 타고 온다 – Lim Hyun-jung feat. Ahn Jae-wook
그녀에게: EP; Released: April 1, 2008	Track listing: 1. 이별인건지 (Radio Ver.); 2. 안녕; 3. 그녀는; 4. 이별인건지 (Original Ver.); 5. 안녕 (MR)
Best Album: Compilation album; Released: December 18, 2008	Track listing: 1. 혼잣말; 2. 두루루; 3. 나에게 너만큼; 4. Yesterday; 5. Only You; 6. 언제나 너의 곁에서; 7. 상처; 8. 내가 사는 이유; 9. 친구; 10. 멋대로 맘대로; 11. Good Bye; 12. 너를 닮아서; 13. 이별인건지; 14. 안녕; 15. Forever
사랑에 살다: EP; Released: August 5, 2009	Track listing: 1. 사랑이 사랑을; 2. Breeze; 3. 화해; 4. 사랑을 보내고; 5. Make Me Smile; 6. 사랑이 사랑을 (MR); 7. 사랑을 보내고 (MR)
청춘: Track from 다섯남자의 다섯번째 이야기; Released: January 13, 2010	Track listing: 01. 청춘 – Tin Tin Five feat. Ahn Jae-wook
Jack the Ripper: Cast recording; Released: August 9, 2010	Track listing: 07. 어쩌면 – Sonya, Ahn Jae-wook; 12. 멈출 수 없어 – Ahn Jae-wook; 17. 내가 바로 잭 – Shin Sung-woo, Ahn Jae-wook; 23. 내가 바로 잭 – Choi Min-cheol, Ahn Jae-wook
At This Moment: EP; Released: March 28, 2012	Track listing: 1. Best Friend; 2. 아직도 꿈꾸는 나를; 3. 그녀석; 4. 미워도 미워도
하늘아 제발 / 바람: Tracks from Lights and Shadows OST; Released: July 6, 2012	Track listing: 03. 하늘아 제발 (Heaven, Please) – Ahn Jae-wook; 09. 바람 (Wind) – Ahn Jae-wook
너라는 하늘: Single; Released: November 13, 2012	Track listing: 01. 너라는 하늘 (Saw the Sky)

== Awards and nominations ==
Year	Award	Category	Nominated work	Result
1995	14th MBC Drama Awards	Best New Actor	Partner, Make A Song, Love and War, Hotel	Won
1996	32nd Baeksang Arts Awards	Best New Actor – Television	Love and War	Won
1996	15th MBC Drama Awards	Excellence Award, Actor	Partner, Their Embrace, Salted Mackerel	Won
1997	KBS Song Festival	Top 10 Singer	—N/a	Won
1997	KBS Song Festival	Best New Singer	—N/a	Won
1997	16th MBC Drama Awards	Best Couple Award	Ahn Jae-wook (with Choi Jin-sil); Star in My Heart	Won
1997	16th MBC Drama Awards	Popularity Award, Actor	Star in My Heart, Revenge and Passion	Won
1998	19th Blue Dragon Film Awards	Best New Actor	Tie a Yellow Ribbon	Won
1998	17th MBC Drama Awards	Top Excellence Award, Actor	Sunflower	Nominated
1999	35th Baeksang Arts Awards	Best Actor – Television	Sunflower	Nominated
1999	18th MBC Drama Awards	Top Excellence Award, Actor	Goodbye My Love	Nominated
1999	18th MBC Drama Awards	TV Actor of the Year (Netizens)	Goodbye My Love	Nominated
2000	19th MBC Drama Awards	Top Excellence Award, Actor	Bad Friends, Mothers and Sisters	Won
2001	Ministry of Culture, Sports and Tourism	Today's Young Artist Award	—N/a	Won
2001	Korea Tourism Organization	Prize for Encouragement	—N/a	Won
2004	2nd Korea Fashion World Awards	Best Dresser Year Award	—N/a	Won
2004	18th KBS Drama Awards	Top Excellence Award, Actor	Oh Feel Young	Won
2004	18th KBS Drama Awards	Best Couple Award	Ahn Jae-wook (with Park Sun-young); Oh Feel Young	Won
2004	17th Grimae Awards	Best Actor	Oh Feel Young	Won
2004	23rd MBC Drama Awards	Top Excellence Award, Actor	Match Made in Heaven	Nominated
2007	6th KBS Entertainment Awards	Best Radio DJ	Mr. Radio	Won
2010	1st Seoul Art and Culture Awards	World Star Award	—N/a	Won
2010	4th Daegu International Musical Festival	Musical Popular Star Award	Rock of Ages	Won
2012	1st APAN Star Awards	Top Excellence Award, Actor	Light and Shadows	Nominated
2012	31st MBC Drama Awards	Top Excellence Award, Actor in a Special Project Drama	Light and Shadows	Nominated
2015	23rd Korean Culture and Entertainment Awards	Top Excellence, Actor in a Musical	Arirang	Won
2016	5th APAN Star Awards	Top Excellence Award, Actor in a Serial Drama	Five Enough	Won
2016	30th KBS Drama Awards	Grand Prize (Daesang)	Five Enough	Nominated
2016	30th KBS Drama Awards	Top Excellence Award, Actor	Five Enough	Nominated
2016	30th KBS Drama Awards	Excellence Award, Actor in a Serial Drama	Five Enough	Won
2017	11st Dimf Awards	Best Star Year Award	Hero	Won
2017	8th Korea Hallyu Awards	Pop Culture Merits Award	—N/a	Won
2018	12nd Dimf Awards	Best Star Year Award	Gwanghwamum Sonata	Won
2023	17th Dimf Awards	Best Star Year Award	Dracula	Won
2025	11th APAN Star Awards	Top Excellence Award, Actor in a Serial Drama	For Eagle Brothers	Won
2025	16th Korea Drama Awards	Grand Prize (Daesang)	For Eagle Brothers	Won
2025	39th KBS Drama Awards	Grand Prize (Daesang)	For Eagle Brothers	Won
2025	39th KBS Drama Awards	Top Excellence Award, Actor	For Eagle Brothers	Nominated
2025	39th KBS Drama Awards	Excellence Award, Actor in a Serial Drama	For Eagle Brothers	Nominated
2025	39th KBS Drama Awards	Best Couple Award	Ahn Jae-wook (with Uhm Ji-won); For Eagle Brothers	Won

== See also ==
- Media related to Ahn Jae-wook at Wikimedia Commons
- Contemporary culture of South Korea
- Korean music
