= 12th Korea Drama Awards =

2019 edition of award ceremony

- Date: October 2, 2019
- Hosted by: Jo Woo-jong, Gong Seo-young

The 12th Korea Drama Awards is an awards ceremony for excellence in television in South Korea. It was held on October 2, 2019.

== Nominations and winners ==
Nominations were announced on September 27, 2019. Winners are denoted in bold.

Grand Prize (Daesang)	Best Drama
**Choi Soo-jong** – **My Only One**; Yum Jung-ah – Sky Castle; Kim Hae-sook – Mother of Mine; Jo Jung-suk – Nokdu Flower	**Sky Castle** (JTBC); Mother of Mine (KBS2); The Fiery Priest (SBS); Doctor Prisoner (KBS2)
Lifetime Achievement Award	Best Screenplay
**Jung Dong-hwan**	**Jo Jung-sun** – **Mother of Mine**; Yoo Hyun-mi – Sky Castle; Park Jae-bum – The Fiery Priest; Park Kye-ok – Doctor Prisoner
Top Excellence Award, Actor	Top Excellence Award, Actress
**Kim Dong-wook** – **Special Labor Inspector**; Jung Kyung-ho – When the Devil Calls Your Name; Park Shin-yang – My Lawyer, Mr. Jo 2: Crime and Punishment; Lee Jung-jae – Chief of Staff	**Kim Min-jung** – **My Fellow Citizens!**; Kim Ha-neul – The Wind Blows; Im Soo-jung – Search: WWW; Park Shin-hye – Memories of the Alhambra
Excellence Award, Actor	Excellence Award, Actress
**Kang Ki-young** – **At Eighteen**; **Lee Kyu-hyung** – **Doctor John**; Shin Sung-rok – Perfume; Lee Joon-hyuk – Designated Survivor: 60 Days	**Lee Se-young** – **The Crowned Clown**; Kim Ji-won – Arthdal Chronicles; Lee Yoo-young – My Fellow Citizens!; Yoo In-na – Touch Your Heart
Best New Actor	Best New Actress
**Ong Seong-wu** – **At Eighteen**; Ahn Hyo-seop – Abyss; Choi Sung-jae – Liver or Die; Kim Myung-soo – Angel's Last Mission: Love	**Kwon Nara** – **Doctor Prisoner**; Na Hye-mi – Home for Summer; Kim Ha-kyung – Mother of Mine; Shin Hyun-been – Confession
Best Original Soundtrack	Hot Star China Award
**"We All Lie" (Ha Jin)** – **Sky Castle**; "Maybe" (Lee Hae-ri) – Her Private Life; "WOW" (Mamamoo) – Search: WWW; "All About You " (Taeyeon) – Hotel del Luna	**Kim Seo-hyung** – **Sky Castle**
Star of the Year Award	Hallyu Star Award
**Go Jun** – **The Fiery Priest**; **Shin Ye-eun** – **He Is Psychometric**	**Ong Seong-wu** – **At Eighteen**
Popular Character Award (Male)	Popular Character Award (Female)
**Ahn Chang-hwan** – **The Fiery Priest**	**Kim Bo-ra** – **Sky Castle**
