= Lee Jang-woo =

South Korean actor and singer (born 1986)

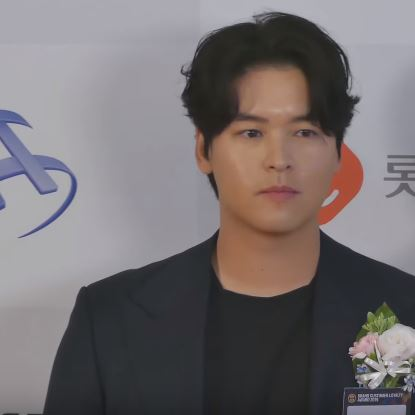
- Lee in 2019
- Born: June 1, 1986 (age 40); Jeonju, South Korea
- Education: Dongguk University – Theater and Film; Seokyeong University – Beauty Arts
- Occupations: Actor; singer
- Years active: 2003–present
- Agent: Hunus Entertainment
- Spouse: Jo Hye-won (m. 2025)

Korean name
- Hangul: 이장우
- Hanja: 李章宇
- RR: I Jangu
- MR: I Changu

Lee Jang-woo (Korean: 이장우; born June 1, 1986) is a South Korean actor and singer. He is best known for his roles in the television series Glory Jane, I Do, I Do, My Only One and Homemade Love Story. Lee also became popular after being paired with Hahm Eun-jung in the third season of fictional marriage reality show We Got Married.

In 2009, Lee, No Min-woo, and Hyun Woo formed the K-pop project group 24/7, which has since disbanded after releasing the single "24 Hours a Day, 7 Days a Week". Lee also appeared in a 2011 music video for his cousin, singer Hwanhee.

== Personal life ==
On June 22, 2023, it was confirmed that Lee was in a relationship with actress Jo Hye-won. On June 21, 2025, Hunus Entertainment confirmed that the couple would be getting married in November. Lee and Jo married on November 23, 2025.

== Filmography ==
=== Film ===
Year	Title	Role	Ref.
2010	Villain and Widow	Constable Oh	

=== Television series ===
Year	Title	Role	Notes	Ref.
2006	Hello Franceska			
2006	90 Days, Time to Love			
2008	Kokkiri (Elephant)			
2009	Hilarious Housewives	Choi Jang-woo		
2009	Three Brothers	Baek Ma-tan		
2010	Smile Again	Kim Do-jin		
2011	KBS Drama Special – "Human Casino"	Lee Jae-sung	One act-drama	
2011	Glory Jane	Seo In-woo		
2012	I Do, I Do	Park Tae-kang		
2012	Here Comes Mr. Oh	Oh Ja-ryong		
2013	Bel Ami	David Choi		
2014	Rosy Lovers	Park Cha-dol		
2016	Infinite Royal Graciousness	Song Jin		
2018–2019	My Only One	Wang Dae-ryook		
2019	Graceful Family	Heo Yoon-do		
2020–2021	Homemade Love Story	Woo Jae-hee		
2023	The Heavenly Idol	Shin Jo-woon / Lumena		

=== Television show ===
Year	Title	Role	Notes	Ref.
2011	We Got Married Season 3	Paired	with Hahm Eun-jung	
2012	Music Bank	MC	with Uee	
2016	Law of the Jungle	Panama	with Hwanhee	
2021	Bistro Shigor	Cooking department		
2022	Untangodo Village Hotel	Responsible for cooking		
2021–present	I Live Alone	Cast Member	Episodes 411–present	
2023	Business Genius Baeksajang	Cast Member	with Kwon Yu-ri, Paik Jong-won and John Park	

=== Music video appearances ===
Year	Song Title	Artist	Ref.
2010	"Because You Sting"	JeA and G.O	
2010	"Udon"	Kang Min-kyung and Son Dong-woon	
2011	"Love Pain"	Hwanhee	
2011	"Bo Peep Bo Peep (Japanese Version)"	T-ara	
2011	"The Way I Am"	Zia	

=== Hosting ===
Year	Title	Notes	Ref.
2011	MBC Gayo Daejejeon	with Hahm Eun-jung, Jo Kwon, Gain, Nichkhun, Victoria Song, Leeteuk, and Kang So-ra	
2024	2024 MBC Entertainment Awards	with Jun Hyun-moo and Yoon Eun-hye	

== Theater ==
Year	English title	Korean title	Role	Ref.
2007	Hamlet	햄릿	Prince Hamlet	
2008	Greece	그리스		
2020	A Better Tomorrow	영웅본색	Jageol	
2021–2022	Rebecca	레베카	Maxim de Winter	
2022	Crash Landing on You	사랑의 불시착	Ri Jeong-hyuk	

== Discography ==
Title	Year	Peak chart positions	Sales	Album
Title	Year	KOR	Sales	Album
"That Guy's Girl" (그녀석의 여자) (as 24/7, with No Min-woo and Hyun Woo)	2009	—		Non-album singles
"Words I Couldn't Say" (차마 하지 못한 말)	2012	23	KOR: 127,598	Non-album singles
"Saying I Love You" (사랑한단 말야)	2013	—		Bel Ami OST

== Awards and nominations ==
Year	Awards	Category	Nominated work	Result
2011	11th MBC Entertainment Awards	Best Male Newcomer in a Variety Show	We Got Married – Season 3	Nominated
2011	25th KBS Drama Awards	Best New Actor	Smile Again; Glory Jane	Won
2012	31st MBC Drama Awards	Best New Actor	I Do, I Do; Here Comes Mr. Oh	Won
2012	7th Asia Model Awards	New Star Award	—N/a	Won
2013	21st Korean Culture and Entertainment Awards	Excellence Award, Actor in a Drama	Here Comes Mr. Oh	Won
2014	33rd MBC Drama Awards	Excellence Award, Actor in a Serial Drama	Rosy Lovers	Won
2014	33rd MBC Drama Awards	Best Couple (with Han Sun-hwa)	Rosy Lovers	Nominated
2018	KBS Drama Awards	Excellence Award, Actor in a Serial Drama	My Only One	Won
2018	KBS Drama Awards	Best Couple (with Uee)	My Only One	Won
2020	7th APAN Star Awards	Top Excellence Award, Actor in Serial Drama	Homemade Love Story	Nominated
2020	KBS Drama Awards	Excellence Award, Actor in a Mid-length Drama	Homemade Love Story	Won
2020	KBS Drama Awards	Best Couple (with Jin Ki-joo and Jeong Bo-seok)	Homemade Love Story	Won
2022	22nd MBC Entertainment Awards	Popularity Award (Variety)	I Live Alone	Won
2022	22nd MBC Entertainment Awards	Best Couple Award (with Jun Hyun-moo and Park Na-rae)	I Live Alone	Won
2023	Broadcast Advertising Festival	Excellence Award, CF	—N/a	Won
