= My Only One (TV series) =

2018 South Korean television series

- Promotional poster
- Hangul: 하나뿐인 내편
- RR: Hanappunin naepyeon
- MR: Hanappunin naep'yŏn
- Genre: Family; Melodrama; Snob Drama
- Created by: KBS Drama Production (KBS 드라마 제작국)
- Written by: Kim Sa-Kyung
- Directed by: Hong Seok-Ku
- Starring: Choi Soo-jong; Uee; Lee Jang-woo; Yoon Jin-yi; Jung Eun-woo; Na Hye-mi; Park Sung-hoon
- Country of origin: South Korea
- Original language: Korean
- No. of episodes: 106 (Note: Repackaged with two 35-minute episodes shown each night from this drama onwards in accordance with MBC and SBS drama serials and with other drama time-slots.) (Note: Originally scheduled to air for 100 episodes, the series was extended by six episodes due to its popularity.)

Production
- Executive producer: Kim Dong-gu
- Producers: Hwang Eui-kyung; KBS Drama
- Camera setup: Single-camera
- Production companies: DK E&M

Original release
- Network: KBS2
- Release: September 15, 2018 – March 17, 2019

My Only One (Korean: 하나뿐인 내편) is a South Korean television series starring Choi Soo-jong, Uee, Lee Jang-woo, Yoon Jin-yi, Jung Eun-woo, Na Hye-mi, and Park Sung-hoon. The series aired on KBS2 every Saturday and Sunday from 19:55 to 21:15 (KST) from September 15, 2018, to March 17, 2019.

== Plot ==
The drama begins with Kim Do-ran living with her foster parents. Her mother had died shortly after her birth and her father was jailed 28 years ago. Do-ran's foster father and her father were friends since childhood. After learning that his childhood friend had asked his landlady to put his daughter, Do-ran in an orphanage, he brought Do-ran home. Do-ran's foster father hid the truth about her father from her and his own family. He treated Do-ran very well and ensured she had a good education. Because of this, Do-ran was treated unfairly by her envious foster sister, Mi-ran, and her foster mother who never regarded her as her own daughter.

Despite such treatment, Do-ran did all she could to earn money for her foster family. During one of her part-time jobs, she had an incident with Dae-ryuk, the scion of the Wang family. Mi-ran wanted to study abroad and become a TV announcer. Do-ran's foster mom and Mi-ran were angry that the foster father wanted to send Do-ran abroad instead. Before he could do so, he died in an accident. His assets were inherited by the foster mother and the foster sister, and Do-ran was thrown out. Alone, she rented a simple apartment and sought employment.

At this time, a general amnesty was issued and Do-ran's father was released from prison. He found a job as a chauffeur with the Wang family. His childhood friend had faithfully sent him pictures of Do-ran's development through the years so he knew what she looked like and how she was doing. However, the letters and pictures suddenly stopped, weeks before his release. In the days that followed, he tried to find Do-ran and came to learn of his childhood friend's accident and death.

Do-ran landed a job as a secretary in Bom and Food Company owned by the Wang family after helping the Wang matriarch, Geum-byung who mistook her for her younger sister during her bout of dementia. Her foster mother who made some bad judgements in investment and was in trouble with loan sharks later sought shelter with her. On learning of the loan shark problem, Do-ran's father secretly helped them by asking for an advance on his chauffeur salary. Taking Do-ran's advice, her foster sister and foster mother later sought employment and were able to support themselves.

Do-ran's relationship with Dae-Ryuk who's the director of the company developed further. Eventually, they married but relations with Da-ya who married the younger Wang brother and Dae-ryuk's mother were strained. The truth that Do-ran's father was a convict and was responsible for Da-ya's father's death came to light one day. The couple was forced to divorce. However, Do-ran's father was later cleared of the murder and he was able to resume a normal life; running a bakery and getting married. Do-ran also severed relations with the Wang family and lived with her father and her foster family. Dae-ryuk still loved Do-ran and wanted to remarry her. The drama finally ended when they promised to remarry each other and walked towards the end.

== Cast ==
=== Main ===
- Choi Soo-jong as Kang Soo-il (formerly known as Kim Young-hoon): Do-ran's biological father
  - Lee Joon-seo as young Soo-il
- Uee as Kim Do-ran: Soo-il's daughter
  - Kim Soo-in as young Do-ran
- Lee Jang-woo as Wang Dae-ryook
- Yoon Jin-yi as Jang Da-ya: Yi-ryook's girlfriend
- Jung Eun-woo as Wang Yi-ryook: Dae-ryook's younger brother
- Na Hye-mi as Kim Mi-ran: Do-ran's adoptive younger sister
  - Kang Joo-ha as young Mi-ran
- Park Sung-hoon as Jang Go-rae: Da-ya's older brother

=== Supporting ===
- Lee Doo-il as Kim Dong-chul: Do-ran's adoptive father
  - Song Joon-hee as young Dong-chul
- Im Ye-jin as So Yang-ja: Do-ran's adoptive mother
- Jung Jae-soon as Park Geum-byung: Dae-ryook's grandmother
- Park Sang-won as Wang Jin-gook: Dae-ryook's father
  - Ji Yun-woo as young Jin-gook
- Cha Hwa-yeon as Oh Eun-young: Dae-ryook's mother
- Lee Hye-sook as Na Hong-sil: Da-ya's mother
- Jin Kyung as Na Hong-joo: Da-ya's aunt
- Kim Chang-hoi as Secretary Hong
- Lee Seung-hyung as Chief Secretary Yang
- Kim Choo-wol as Yeo Joo-daek: Wang's family housekeeper
- Hwang Geum-byul as Miss Jo: Wang's family housekeeper
- Go Woo-ri (Note: Credited as Go Na-eun) as Jang So-young: JS Group President's daughter
- Im Ji-hyun as Yoo-jin: Do-ran's friend
- Lee Yong-yi as Geum-ok: Yoo-jin's grandmother
- Lee Sang-koo as Father Peter
- Park Hyun-jung as Yeon-yi : Do-ran's biological mother
- Park Ha-na as Sung Soo-hyun: Daughter of Q Pharmaceuticals
- Kang Doo as Park Dong-won: Soo-Il's friend
- Lee Sang-hoon as Byun Tae-suk: Hong-joo's ex-husband
- Lee Young-suk as Noh Sook-ja: Loan shark
- Kim Jung-heon as Seung-joon: Go-rae's friend
- Song Won-seok as Lee Tae-poong: Bakery employee
- Lee Joo-bin as Soo-jung: Yi-ryook's restaurant's employee
- Choi Dae-chul as Jang Dae Ho: Go Rae and Da Ya's father
- Kil Yong-woo
- Lee Hwi-hyang
- Na Yoon-hee
- Kang Sung-min
- Lee Joon-hyuk

== Viewership ==
My Only One : South Korea viewers per episode (millions)

Episodes	Episode number																			
Episodes	1	2	3	4	5	6	7	8	9	10	11	12	13	14	15	16	17	18	19	20
Ep.1-20	3.558	4.171	3.892	4.347	2.720	3.409	3.012	3.415	3.555	4.517	4.314	5.064	4.026	4.592	4.215	5.024	3.556	4.361	4.403	5.167
Ep.21-40	4.098	4.298	4.626	5.273	3.672	4.650	4.664	5.498	3.796	4.592	4.858	5.655	3.968	4.824	5.731	4.861	4.475	5.048	4.788	5.868
Ep.41-60	4.192	5.148	5.365	6.165	4.548	5.277	5.469	6.299	4.451	5.267	5.570	6.308	4.387	5.303	5.671	6.578	4.516	5.513	5.931	6.690
Ep.61-80	5.343	6.213	4.939	6.038	5.758	6.735	5.199	6.138	6.215	7.416	5.605	6.559	6.507	7.627	5.441	6.621	6.237	7.102	5.320	6.523
Ep.81-100	6.229	7.178	5.553	6.661	6.331	7.014	5.329	6.474	6.764	7.870	5.783	6.878	7.395	8.422	6.126	7.229	7.439	8.488	6.694	7.925
Ep.101-106	8.118	9.246	6.742	8.042	7.693	8.883	–													

Source: Audience measurement performed nationwide by Nielsen Media Research.

Average TV viewership ratings
Ep.	Original broadcast date	Average audience share		
Ep.	Original broadcast date	TNmS	AGB Nielsen	
Ep.	Original broadcast date	Nationwide	Nationwide	Seoul
1	September 15, 2018	20.8%	21.2% (2nd)	19.9% (2nd)
2	September 15, 2018	24.6%	24.3% (1st)	22.7% (1st)
3	September 16, 2018	22.7%	22.8% (2nd)	21.3% (2nd)
4	September 16, 2018	26.3%	25.6% (1st)	23.9% (1st)
5	September 22, 2018	18.2%	17.2% (2nd)	15.6% (2nd)
6	September 22, 2018	21.4%	21.5% (1st)	19.7% (1st)
7	September 23, 2018	18.9%	17.6% (2nd)	16.8% (2nd)
8	September 23, 2018	21.9%	20.6% (1st)	19.9% (1st)
9	September 29, 2018	23.0%	21.8% (2nd)	20.0% (2nd)
10	September 29, 2018	27.7%	27.1% (1st)	25.6% (1st)
11	September 30, 2018	27.0%	25.5% (2nd)	24.5% (2nd)
12	September 30, 2018	30.8%	29.3% (1st)	27.9% (1st)
13	October 6, 2018	—N/a	24.7% (2nd)	23.5% (2nd)
14	October 6, 2018	—N/a	27.3% (1st)	25.9% (1st)
15	October 7, 2018	25.8%	25.0% (2nd)	23.8% (2nd)
16	October 7, 2018	29.5%	29.4% (1st)	27.9% (1st)
17	October 13, 2018	22.8%	21.6% (2nd)	19.5% (2nd)
18	October 13, 2018	26.9%	25.9% (1st)	24.1% (1st)
19	October 14, 2018	26.4%	26.1% (2nd)	24.0% (2nd)
20	October 14, 2018	31.3%	30.1% (1st)	27.8% (1st)
21	October 20, 2018	26.9%	24.9% (2nd)	23.4% (2nd)
22	October 20, 2018	27.4%	25.7% (1st)	23.8% (1st)
23	October 21, 2018	27.7%	27.1% (2nd)	25.3% (2nd)
24	October 21, 2018	31.7%	31.2% (1st)	29.3% (1st)
25	October 27, 2018	24.9%	23.1% (2nd)	21.7% (2nd)
26	October 27, 2018	29.2%	27.9% (1st)	26.9% (1st)
27	October 28, 2018	29.2%	27.6% (2nd)	25.9% (2nd)
28	October 28, 2018	33.6%	32.6% (1st)	31.1% (1st)
29	November 3, 2018	26.2%	25.0% (2nd)	23.0% (2nd)
30	November 3, 2018	30.0%	29.6% (1st)	27.7% (1st)
31	November 4, 2018	27.9%	28.5% (2nd)	26.8% (2nd)
32	November 4, 2018	32.6%	33.3% (1st)	31.5% (1st)
33	November 10, 2018	25.4%	23.9% (2nd)	22.1% (2nd)
34	November 10, 2018	29.4%	28.8% (1st)	27.0% (1st)
35	November 11, 2018	28.4%	33.1% (1st)	27.2% (2nd)
36	November 11, 2018	33.9%	28.4% (2nd)	32.0% (1st)
37	November 17, 2018	26.8%	26.7% (2nd)	24.6% (2nd)
38	November 17, 2018	30.3%	30.2% (1st)	28.0% (1st)
39	November 18, 2018	29.7%	28.7% (2nd)	26.4% (2nd)
40	November 18, 2018	36.1%	33.9% (1st)	31.8% (1st)
41	November 24, 2018	28.3%	26.2% (2nd)	23.8% (2nd)
42	November 24, 2018	33.4%	31.8% (1st)	29.3% (1st)
43	November 25, 2018	32.8%	30.7% (2nd)	28.4% (2nd)
44	November 25, 2018	36.4%	34.8% (1st)	32.3% (1st)
45	December 1, 2018	28.6%	26.2% (2nd)	24.5% (2nd)
46	December 1, 2018	32.8%	31.0% (1st)	29.3% (1st)
47	December 2, 2018	32.8%	31.5% (2nd)	30.1% (2nd)
48	December 2, 2018	37.5%	36.3% (1st)	34.6% (1st)
49	December 8, 2018	29.3%	26.2% (2nd)	24.9% (2nd)
50	December 8, 2018	33.8%	30.8% (1st)	29.1% (1st)
51	December 9, 2018	32.0%	31.3% (2nd)	28.6% (2nd)
52	December 9, 2018	36.8%	36.1% (1st)	33.8% (1st)
53	December 15, 2018	26.4%	26.6% (2nd)	25.7% (2nd)
54	December 15, 2018	31.8%	31.6% (1st)	30.7% (1st)
55	December 16, 2018	30.3%	32.1% (2nd)	30.8% (2nd)
56	December 16, 2018	35.3%	36.2% (1st)	34.8% (1st)
57	December 22, 2018	25.2%	28.1% (2nd)	27.0% (2nd)
58	December 22, 2018	30.5%	33.7% (1st)	32.2% (1st)
59	December 23, 2018	32.0%	32.5% (2nd)	30.6% (2nd)
60	December 23, 2018	35.8%	36.8% (1st)	34.9% (1st)
61	December 30, 2018 (Note: No episodes were aired on December 29 due to the broadcast of a special episode.)	31.2%	31.7% (2nd)	31.4% (2nd)
62	December 30, 2018	34.7%	35.9% (1st)	35.4% (1st)
63	January 5, 2019	28.5%	29.2% (2nd)	27.3% (2nd)
64	January 5, 2019	32.2%	34.8% (1st)	32.9% (1st)
65	January 6, 2019	31.2%	32.4% (2nd)	30.4% (2nd)
66	January 6, 2019	37.2%	37.7% (1st)	36.1% (1st)
67	January 12, 2019	29.7%	30.8% (2nd)	29.6% (2nd)
68	January 12, 2019	34.7%	35.2% (1st)	33.8% (1st)
69	January 13, 2019	33.0%	35.1% (2nd)	33.0% (2nd)
70	January 13, 2019	38.8%	41.6% (1st)	39.2% (1st)
71	January 19, 2019	29.6%	32.5% (2nd)	32.0% (2nd)
72	January 19, 2019	35.3%	37.1% (1st)	36.2% (1st)
73	January 20, 2019	32.9%	35.2% (2nd)	33.4% (2nd)
74	January 20, 2019	38.9%	41.0% (1st)	39.4% (1st)
75	January 26, 2019	30.5%	32.2% (2nd)	30.9% (2nd)
76	January 26, 2019	36.6%	37.6% (1st)	36.3% (1st)
77	January 27, 2019	34.5%	35.5% (2nd)	34.3% (2nd)
78	January 27, 2019	40.3%	39.9% (1st)	38.5% (1st)
79	February 2, 2019	29.5%	31.3% (2nd)	29.5% (2nd)
80	February 2, 2019	35.3%	37.5% (1st)	36.4% (1st)
81	February 3, 2019	32.5%	34.7% (2nd)	34.1% (2nd)
82	February 3, 2019	37.9%	39.3% (1st)	38.9% (1st)
83	February 9, 2019	30.7%	32.0% (2nd)	31.2% (2nd)
84	February 9, 2019	36.0%	36.9% (1st)	36.1% (1st)
85	February 10, 2019	33.8%	35.3% (2nd)	33.5% (2nd)
86	February 10, 2019	38.1%	38.4% (1st)	37.1% (1st)
87	February 16, 2019	28.8%	31.8% (2nd)	30.3% (2nd)
88	February 16, 2019	35.5%	37.7% (1st)	36.2% (1st)
89	February 17, 2019	34.8%	37.6% (2nd)	35.8% (2nd)
90	February 17, 2019	41.0%	42.6% (1st)	41.1% (1st)
91	February 23, 2019	32.8%	33.8% (2nd)	32.3% (2nd)
92	February 23, 2019	38.7%	39.3% (1st)	37.6% (1st)
93	February 24, 2019	38.8%	39.7% (2nd)	37.8% (2nd)
94	February 24, 2019	44.4%	44.6% (1st)	43.1% (1st)
95	March 2, 2019	33.3%	34.9% (2nd)	33.7% (2nd)
96	March 2, 2019	39.4%	40.8% (1st)	40.1% (1st)
97	March 3, 2019	39.2%	41.4% (2nd)	39.6% (2nd)
98	March 3, 2019	45.8%	46.2% (1st)	44.7% (1st)
99	March 9, 2019	35.2%	37.6% (2nd)	36.4% (2nd)
100	March 9, 2019	40.9%	42.9% (1st)	42.1% (1st)
101	March 10, 2019	40.3%	44.1% (2nd)	42.1% (2nd)
102	March 10, 2019	46.1%	49.4% (1st)	47.3% (1st)
103	March 16, 2019	35.9%	37.6% (2nd)	37.2% (2nd)
104	March 16, 2019	41.9%	43.8% (1st)	44.0% (1st)
105	March 17, 2019	41.9%	42.8% (2nd)	41.7% (1st)
106	March 17, 2019	48.5%	48.9% (2nd)	47.7% (1st)
Average		— (Note: Due to some ratings not recorded, the exact average rating is unknown.)	32.3%	30.8%
Special	December 29, 2018	—N/a	19.6%	18.7%
Special	December 29, 2018	—N/a	18.7%	17.6%
In this table above, the blue numbers represent the lowest ratings and the red numbers represent the highest ratings.; N/A denotes that the rating is not known.

== Awards and nominations ==
Year	Award	Category	Recipient	Result	Ref.
2018	2018 KBS Drama Awards	Top Excellence Award, Actor	Choi Soo-jong	Won	
2018	2018 KBS Drama Awards	Top Excellence Award, Actress	Cha Hwa-yeon	Won	
2018	2018 KBS Drama Awards	Excellence Award, Actor in a Serial Drama	Choi Soo-jong	Nominated	
2018	2018 KBS Drama Awards	Excellence Award, Actor in a Serial Drama	Lee Jang-woo	Won	
2018	2018 KBS Drama Awards	Excellence Award, Actor in a Serial Drama	Park Sang-won	Nominated	
2018	2018 KBS Drama Awards	Excellence Award, Actress in a Serial Drama	Uee	Won	
2018	2018 KBS Drama Awards	Excellence Award, Actress in a Serial Drama	Cha Hwa-yeon	Nominated	
2018	2018 KBS Drama Awards	Best Supporting Actress	Jin Kyung	Nominated	
2018	2018 KBS Drama Awards	Best Supporting Actress	Yoon Jin-yi	Won	
2018	2018 KBS Drama Awards	Best New Actor	Park Sung-hoon	Won	
2018	2018 KBS Drama Awards	Best Screenwriter	Kim Sa-kyung	Won	
2018	2018 KBS Drama Awards	Best Couple	Lee Jang-woo & Uee	Won	
2018	2018 KBS Drama Awards	Best Couple	Choi Soo-jong & Jin Kyung	Won	
2019	55th Baeksang Arts Awards	Best New Actor (TV)	Park Sung-hoon	Nominated	
2019	12th Korea Drama Awards	Grand Prize (Daesang)	Choi Soo-jong	Won	

== Adaptation ==
- Vietnam - In 2021, this series was adapted in Vietnam as Hương vị tình thân, aired on government-owned VTV1.
