= Son Jin-young =

South Korean singer and actor (born 1985)

- Born: October 31, 1985 (age 40); Incheon, South Korea
- Occupations: Singer; actor
- Years active: 2010–present
- Agent: Faith Entertainment
- Spouse: Kim Seong-hyeon

Korean name
- Hangul: 손진영
- RR: Son Jinyeong
- MR: Son Chinyŏng

Son Jin-young (born October 31, 1985) is a South Korean singer and actor. In 2010, Son joined the singing competition program The Great Birth (also known as Birth of a Great Star) and finished in fourth place. He has since released several singles and frequently appears on variety/reality shows, notably Real Men from 2013 to 2014. Son has also played supporting roles in television series such as 1980's-set musical drama Lights and Shadows (2011) and spy comedy 7th Grade Civil Servant (2013).

== Discography ==
Album information	Track listing
바보라서 (Because I'm Stupid): Single; Released: June 21, 2012; Label: Boohwal Entertainment, KT Music	Track listing: 1. 바보라서; 2. 바보라서 (Inst.)
진짜 사나이 (Real Men): Single; Released: November 13, 2013; Label:	Track listing: 1. 진짜 사나이; 2. 진짜 사나이 (Inst.)
Romantic Christmas: Single; Released: November 28, 2013; Label:	Track listing: 1. Romantic Christmas (feat. Noh Soo-ram); 2. 설레는노래 (로맨틱크리스마스) (feat. Noh Soo-ram; 3. Romantic Christmas (Inst.)
미안해 (I'm Sorry): Single; Released: June 9, 2014; Label:	Track listing: 1. 미안해; 2. 미안해 (Inst.)

== Filmography ==
=== Television series ===
Year	Title	Role
2011	Lights and Shadows	Hong Soo-bong
2012	Reckless Family 1	(cameo)
2012	Reply 1997	young Yoon Joon-hyuk in 1968 (cameo, episode 9)
2012	What Is Mom?	Son Jin-young
2013	7th Grade Civil Servant	Kim Poong-eon
2014	Drama Festival: "The Diary of a Resentful Woman"	Lee Bang

=== Variety show ===
Year	Title	Notes
2010	Star Audition: The Great Birth – Season 1	Contestant
2013	Star Love Village	Cast member
2013	Real Men	Cast member
2013	Millionaire Game: My Turn	
2013	Happy Together – Season 3	
2014	The Four Musketeers Quiz Show	
2014	Let's Go! Dream Team Season 2	
2014	Vitamin	
2014	Star Flower	
2014	Emergency Escape No. 1	
2014	Brazil World Cup Special: Idol Futsal World Cup	
2014	Special Live Broadcast: Donate Blood, Share Life	
2014	The Most Exciting Festival in the World, Nongak	Cast member
2016	King of Mask Singer	Contestant as "The Legendary Catcher Baekdusan" (episodes 63, 64)
