= I Do, I Do (TV series) =

2012 South Korean TV series

- Promotional poster
- Genre: Romance; Comedy; Drama
- Written by: Jo Jung-hwa
- Directed by: Kang Dae-sun
- Starring: Kim Sun-a; Lee Jang-woo; Park Gun-hyung; Im Soo-hyang
- Country of origin: South Korea
- Original language: Korean
- No. of episodes: 16

Production
- Production company: Kim Jong-hak Production

Original release
- Network: MBC TV
- Release: May 30 – July 19, 2012

I Do, I Do (Korean: 아이두 아이두) is a 2012 South Korean romantic comedy television series starring Kim Sun-a, Lee Jang-woo, Park Gun-hyung, and Im Soo-hyang. It is about a successful shoe designer in her late 30s whose career is sidetracked when she accidentally becomes pregnant.

The series aired on MBC from May 30 to July 19, 2012 on Wednesdays and Thursdays at 21:55 for 16 episodes.

== Plot ==
Hwang Ji-ahn is in her late thirties and works as a director of a shoe company. She likes being single and has no plans to get married. Meanwhile, Tae-kang only has a high school diploma but wants a career as a shoe designer. After a one-night stand, Tae-kang gets Ji-ahn pregnant and their lives become entangled. Fighting against rigid social mores, the two of them try to navigate a messy and challenging world. But these two people persevere despite the obstacles before them, searching for true happiness despite living in a society where morally acceptable behavior is in constant flux.

== Cast and characters ==
- Kim Sun-a as Hwang Ji-ahn

Ji-an is a director at popular shoe company at her late 30s. She is spunky, curt, authoritarian, hard-charging and susceptible to having hysterical fits when she is under stress. Since Ji-an was young, she had an unexplainable affection for shoes. Even when Ji-an would just throw on tracksuit pants and wear no makeup, she made sure she always wore the right shoes. Her love for shoes naturally led her to join a shoe company. Working harder and more passionately than anyone else, she was promoted to the position of director. However, a one-night stand is about to throw a wrench in her immaculate and perfect life.

- Lee Jang-woo as Park Tae-kang

Tae-kang is a man in his 20s who vowed to become rich within ten years. He only has a high school diploma, works as a seller of counterfeit luxury shoes, and constantly runs away from the police during crackdowns on illicit goods. Despite this, Tae-kang believes that he has to maintain his cool style. By a stroke of luck, he is hired by a chaebol firm as a shoe designer.

- Park Gun-hyung as Jo Eun-sung

Eun-sung is a charming gynecologist and highly eligible bachelor in his late 30s. He was under pressure to attend a medical school due to coming from a family of doctors. Eun-sung wants to keep dating girls without settling down with one woman, thus has chosen to live as a bachelor.

- Im Soo-hyang as Yeom Na-ri/Jang Na-ri

Na-ri is the youngest daughter of the chairman of Hanyoung Apparel. She graduated with top honors from the S-Mode Institute and holds the title of vice president at her father's company. Following her father's footsteps, Na-ri competes with her rival, Ji-ahn, and plans on getting rid of her at the company.

- Park Yeong-gyu as Park Kwang-seok, Tae-kang's father
- Yoon Joo-sang as Ji-ahn's father
- Shin Seung-hwan as Lee Choong-baek
- Jo Hee-bong as Seol Bong-soo
- Kim Hye-eun as Bong Joon-hee
- Oh Mi-yeon as Ji-ahn's mother
- Oh Mi-hee as Lady Jang
- Lee Dae-yeon as President Yeom
- Kim Beom-yong as Song Ha-yoon
- Baek Seung-hee as Uhm Yoo-jin
- Kim Min-hee as Ma Seong-mi
- Han Ji-wan as Yoo Da-in
- Jeon Soo-kyeong as Agency employee (cameo)

== Production ==
Kim Sun-a's extravagant walk-in shoe closet was custom-made for the drama, with the shoes inside plus those located in the character's company and office amounting to a total of 500 pairs of footwear worth ₩120 million.

Kim's chic fashion style has also become trend-setting, increasing the demand for the brands the character uses in the drama, as well as her bob hairstyle. According to wardrobe stylist Kim Young-joo, some of the credit belongs to actress Kim Sun-a, who gave her input during their fashion concept meetings.

At the 18th Shanghai Television Festival in June 2012, the broadcast rights of the show were sold to Japan and Taiwan.

== Reception ==
The drama received lower-than-expected ratings with an average of 8.2 percent, according to data compiled by TNmS (Total National Multimedia Statistics); it remained at the bottom of the Wednesday and Thursday primetime ratings chart throughout the whole 16 episodes.

== Ratings ==
In the table below, the blue numbers represent the lowest ratings and the red numbers represent the highest ratings.

Episode #	Original broadcast date	Average audience share			
Episode #	Original broadcast date	TNmS Ratings		AGB Nielsen	
Episode #	Original broadcast date	Nationwide	Seoul National Capital Area	Nationwide	Seoul National Capital Area
1	May 30, 2012	8.2%	9.5%	10.5%	12.4%
2	May 31, 2012	8.0%	9.6%	9.8%	12.0%
3	June 6, 2012	9.2%	10.7%	9.8%	10.3%
4	June 7, 2012	8.1%	9.5%	9.0%	10.3%
5	June 13, 2012	10.0%	12.1%	10.0%	12.0%
6	June 14, 2012	9.0%	11.3%	9.2%	10.6%
7	June 20, 2012	8.2%	9.4%	9.6%	10.4%
8	June 21, 2012	8.6%	10.2%	8.9%	10.6%
9	June 27, 2012	8.2%	11.1%	9.2%	10.4%
10	June 28, 2012	7.8%	9.3%	9.3%	10.5%
11	July 4, 2012	8.1%	10.1%	8.7%	9.8%
12	July 5, 2012	8.5%	10.4%	9.1%	10.5%
13	July 11, 2012	9.3%	11.3%	9.7%	11.0%
14	July 12, 2012	9.2%	11.0%	8.9%	9.5%
15	July 18, 2012	8.3%	10.6%	9.0%	9.9%
16	July 19, 2012	8.1%	9.9%	9.1%	10.0%
Average		8.5%	10.4%	9.3%	10.6%

== Soundtrack ==
1. "That Girl Over Flowers" (꽃보다 그녀) – Yesung (Super Junior)
2. "I Do" – Park Ji-yoon
3. "Running Man" (러닝맨; remastered) – Lee Won-suk (Daybreak)
4. "If It Was You" (나였으면) – Alex Chu
5. "Like the First Time" (처음처럼) – Kim Tae-hyung (Eden)
6. "I Do, I Do" (아이두 아이두)
7. "Victory Jian"
8. "Lucky Seven"
9. "Ha, Hai, Yeh!"
10. "Woman, Ji-ahn" (여자, 지안)
11. "Sweet and Warm"
12. "Love On High Heels"
13. "Kangaroo's Love" (캥거루의 사랑)
14. "Marcato Time"
15. "A Pretty Girl"
16. "No Sense"
17. "Sketch on an Easel"
18. "Decalcomania" (데칼코마니)
19. "Gloomy Day"
20. "Living as a Woman" (여자로 산다는 건)
21. "Tone on Tone"
22. "Let Me Know the Secret Take 1"
23. "Whimsy"
24. "Something Sweet"
25. "Gag Duo"
26. "A Clumsy Day"
27. "Let Me Know the Secret Take 2"
28. "Decalcomania Love" (데칼코마니 러브)

== Awards and nominations ==
Year	Award	Category	Recipient	Result
2012	31st MBC Drama Awards	Best New Actor	Lee Jang-woo	Won
