= 2010 KBS Drama Awards =

24th edition of award ceremony

- Date: December 31, 2010
- Hosted by: Choi Soo-jong; Lee Da-hae; Song Joong-ki

Television coverage
- Network: KBS

The 2010 KBS Drama Awards is a ceremony honoring the outstanding achievement in television on the Korean Broadcasting System (KBS) network for the year of 2010. It was held on December 31, 2010, and hosted by Choi Soo-jong, Lee Da-hae and Song Joong-ki.

== Nominations and winners ==
(Winners denoted in bold)

Grand Prize (Daesang)
**Jang Hyuk** – **The Slave Hunters**
Top Excellence Award, Actor	Top Excellence Award, Actress
**Kim Kap-soo** – **Cinderella's Stepsister, Sungkyunkwan Scandal, The Slave Hunters**; Choi Soo-jong – Legend of the Patriots, President; Jang Hyuk – The Slave Hunters; Jun Kwang-ryul – Bread, Love and Dreams; Lee Jong-hyuk – Marry Me, Please, The Slave Hunters	**Jeon In-hwa** – **Bread, Love and Dreams**; **Moon Geun-young** – **Cinderella's Stepsister**; Han Eun-jung – Grudge: The Revolt of Gumiho; Kim Ji-young – Marry Me, Please; Lee Da-hae – The Slave Hunters; Lee Mi-sook – Cinderella's Stepsister
Excellence Award, Actor in a Miniseries	Excellence Award, Actress in a Miniseries
**Kim Soo-ro** – **Master of Study**; Jang Hyun-sung – Grudge: The Revolt of Gumiho; Jang Keun-suk – Marry Me, Mary!; Kim Sang-kyung – My Country Calls; Yoo Seung-ho – Master of Study	**Han Eun-jung** – **Grudge: The Revolt of Gumiho**; Bae Doona – Master of Study; Kim Jung-nan – Grudge: The Revolt of Gumiho; Lee Soo-kyung – My Country Calls; Oh Yoon-ah – Master of Study
Excellence Award, Actor in a Mid-length Drama	Excellence Award, Actress in a Mid-length Drama
**Oh Ji-ho** – **The Slave Hunters**; Chun Jung-myung – Cinderella's Stepsister; Ji Hyun-woo – Becoming a Billionaire; Jung Ji-hoon (Rain) – The Fugitive: Plan B; Song Joong-ki – Sungkyunkwan Scandal	**Park Min-young** – **Sungkyunkwan Scandal**; Lee Bo-young – Becoming a Billionaire; Lee Da-hae – The Slave Hunters; Lee Na-young – The Fugitive: Plan B; Moon Geun-young – Cinderella's Stepsister
Excellence Award, Actor in a Special Project and Serial Drama	Excellence Award, Actress in a Special Project and Serial Drama
**Yoon Shi-yoon** – **Bread, Love and Dreams**; Cha In-pyo – The Reputable Family; Han Jae-suk – The Great Merchant; Jung Sung-mo – Bread, Love and Dreams; Kim Roi-ha – Legend of the Patriots	**Eugene** – **Bread, Love and Dreams**; Jeon In-hwa – Bread, Love and Dreams; Lee Mi-yeon – The Great Merchant; Lee Tae-ran – Legend of the Patriots; Lee Young-ah – Bread, Love and Dreams
Excellence Award, Actor in a Daily Drama	Excellence Award, Actress in a Daily Drama
**Lee Jong-hyuk** – **Marry Me, Please**; Ahn Nae-sang – Sungkyunkwan Scandal; Han Sang-jin – Marry Me, Please; Jin Yi-han – Happiness in the Wind; Park In-hwan – Three Brothers	**Kim Ji-young** – **Marry Me, Please**; Do Ji-won – Three Brothers; Kim Hee-jung – Three Brothers; Kim So-eun – Happiness in the Wind; Lee Bo-hee – Three Brothers; Oh Yoon-ah – Marry Me, Please
Excellence Award, Actor in a One-Act/Special/Short Drama	Excellence Award, Actress in a One-Act/Special/Short Drama
**Lee Sun-kyun** – **Drama Special "Our Slightly Risque Relationship"**; **Son Hyun-joo** – **Drama Special "Texas Hit"**; Jung Dong-hwan – Freedom Fighter, Lee Hoe-young; Lee Jae-ryong – Drama Special "Red Candy"; No Min-woo – Drama Special "Rock, Rock, Rock"; Oh Man-seok – Drama Special "Spy Trader Kim Chul-soo's Recent Condition"	**Jung Yu-mi** – **Drama Special "The Great Gye Choon-bin"**; Han Ji-hye – Drama Special "Pianist"; Hwang Woo-seul-hye – Drama Special "Our Slightly Risque Relationship"; Park Si-yeon – Drama Special "Red Candy"
Best Supporting Actor	Best Supporting Actress
**Sung Dong-il** – **The Slave Hunters, The Fugitive: Plan B**; Byun Hee-bong – Master of Study; Chun Ho-jin – Grudge: The Revolt of Gumiho; Jang Hang-sun – Bread, Love and Dreams; Park Sang-myun – Marry Me, Mary!, Bread, Love and Dreams	**Lee Bo-hee** – **Three Brothers**; Im Ji-eun – Master of Study; Jeon Mi-seon – Bread, Love and Dreams; Jo Mi-ryung – The Slave Hunters; Lee In-hye – Legend of the Patriots
Best New Actor	Best New Actress
**Park Yoo-chun** – **Sungkyunkwan Scandal**; Ji Chang-wook – Smile Again; Joo Won – Bread, Love and Dreams; Ok Taecyeon – Cinderella's Stepsister; Yoo Ah-in – Sungkyunkwan Scandal; Yoon Shi-yoon – Bread, Love and Dreams	**Lee Si-young** – **Becoming a Billionaire**; **Oh Ji-eun** – **Three Brothers, Smile Again**; Go Ah-sung – Master of Study; Kim Ha-eun – The Slave Hunters; Park Ji-yeon – Master of Study; Seo Woo – Cinderella's Stepsister
Best Young Actor	Best Young Actress
**Oh Jae-moo** – **Bread, Love and Dreams**; Kim Dan-yool – Cinderella's Stepsister, Sungkyunkwan Scandal; Shin Dong-woo – Bread, Love and Dreams; Yeo Jin-goo – The Reputable Family	**Kim Yoo-jung** – **Grudge: The Revolt of Gumiho**; **Seo Shin-ae** – **Grudge: The Revolt of Gumiho**; Moon Ka-young – The Reputable Family; Park Yoo-sun – Drama Special "Last Flashman"
Popularity Award, Actor	Popularity Award, Actress
**Song Joong-ki** – **Sungkyunkwan Scandal**	**Moon Geun-young** – **Cinderella's Stepsister**, **Marry Me, Mary!**
Netizen Award, Actor	Netizen Award, Actress
**Jang Keun-suk** – **Marry Me, Mary!**; **Park Yoo-chun** – **Sungkyunkwan Scandal**; Jang Hyuk – The Slave Hunters; Jung Ji-hoon (Rain) – The Fugitive: Plan B; Oh Ji-ho – The Slave Hunters; Ok Taecyeon – Cinderella's Stepsister; Song Joong-ki – Sungkyunkwan Scandal; Yoo Ah-in – Sungkyunkwan Scandal; Yoo Seung-ho – Master of Study; Yoon Shi-yoon – Bread, Love and Dreams	**Park Min-young** – **Sungkyunkwan Scandal**; Bae Doona – Master of Study; Han Eun-jung – Grudge: The Revolt of Gumiho; Kim Yoo-jung – Grudge: The Revolt of Gumiho; Lee Da-hae – The Slave Hunters; Lee Na-young – The Fugitive: Plan B; Lee Si-young – Becoming a Billionaire; Lee Young-ah – Bread, Love and Dreams; Moon Geun-young – Cinderella's Stepsister, Marry Me, Mary!; Seo Woo – Cinderella's Stepsister
Best Couple Award	Best Writer
**Jang Hyuk** and **Lee Da-hae** – **The Slave Hunters**; **Jang Keun-suk** and **Moon Geun-young** – **Marry Me, Mary!**; **Park Yoo-chun** and **Park Min-young** – **Sungkyunkwan Scandal**; **Song Joong-ki** and **Yoo Ah-in** – **Sungkyunkwan Scandal**; **Yoon Shi-yoon** and **Lee Young-ah** – **Bread, Love and Dreams**; Chun Jung-myung and Moon Geun-young – Cinderella's Stepsister; Jin Yi-han and Kim So-eun – Happiness in the Wind; Jung Ji-hoon (Rain) and Lee Na-young – The Fugitive: Plan B; Kim Yoo-jung and Seo Shin-ae – Grudge: The Revolt of Gumiho; Lee Jong-hyuk and Kim Ji-young – Marry Me, Please; Noh Joo-hyun and Lee Bo-hee – Three Brothers; Yoo Seung-ho and Park Ji-yeon – Master of Study	**Kang Eun-kyung** – **Bread, Love and Dreams**
