= Baek Bong-ki =

South Korean actor (born 1980)

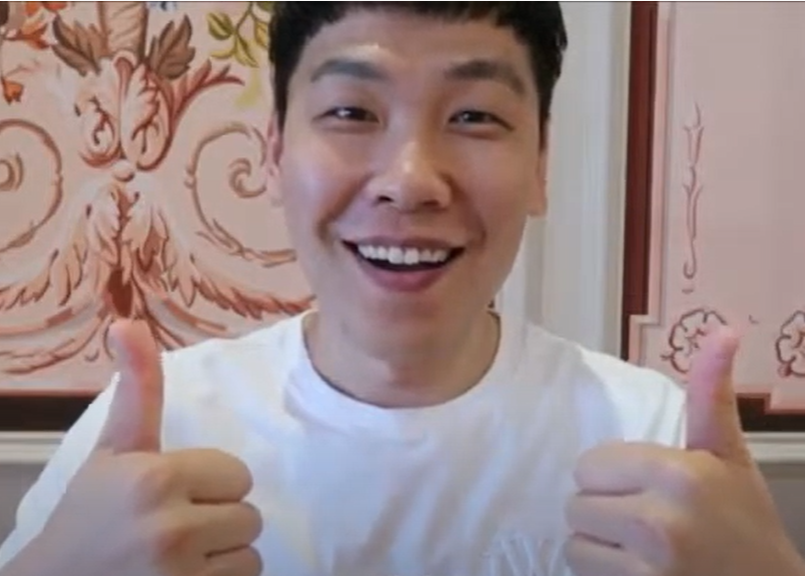
- Baek in May 2019
- Born: December 16, 1980 (age 45); Daejeon, South Korea
- Education: Daejeon University - Fashion Design
- Occupation: Actor
- Years active: 2001–present
- Agent: Grim Company
- Spouse: Lee Yoo-ri (m. 2013)
- Children: Baek A-ran

Korean name
- Hangul: 백봉기
- Hanja: 白峯基
- RR: Baek Bonggi
- MR: Paek Ponggi

Baek Bong-ki (Korean: 백봉기; born December 16, 1980) is a South Korean actor. He is best known for his roles in the noir film Once Upon a Time in High School (2004) and the military sitcom Blue Tower.

== Filmography ==
=== Film ===
Year	Title	Role
2002	Four Toes	Cheongddolpa underling
2002	Saving My Hubby	Yangdongyipa drug mule 1/Delivery man in a suit
2003	Madeleine	Man-ho's successor
2003	Memories of Murder	Dressed as a policeman
2003	Happy Ero Christmas	Noh Hae-chool
2004	Once Upon a Time in High School	Cheetah
2004	The Big Swindle	Waiter 1
2006	Master Kims	Punk 1
2007	May 18	Won-ki
2008	Nowhere to Turn	Seok-jae
2012	R2B: Return to Base	Sergeant Kim
2014	A Case of Bachelor Abduction	Hak-moon
2017	RV: Resurrected Victims	Min-wook
2018	Golden Slumber	Courier competition man
2018	Mother	

=== Television series ===
Year	Title	Role
2001	School 4	Gangster bullying the teacher
2002	My Platoon Leader	Sergeant Sung Dae-hyun
2004	Human Market	(guest, episode 342)
2004	Miracle	Police officer Baek
2005	Sad Love Story	Yong-chul
2005	Loveholic	
2005	Ballad of Seodong	Beom-ro (guest, episode 2)
2007	Drama City – "A Small Giant"	Park Seung-jae
2010	Pasta	Min Seung-jae
2010	Grudge: The Revolt of Gumiho	Ba-wi
2011	My Princess	Bong-jae
2011	Sweet Palpitations	Kim Joob-sub
2011	Miss Ripley	Deputy manager Kim
2011	Me Too, Flower!	
2012	Syndrome	(guest, episode 1)
2012	Ice Adonis	
2012	Tight Family	Baek Bong-ki
2013	Blue Tower	Private first class Baek Bong-ki
2013	Miss Korea	Oh Ji-seok
2014	Triangle	Park Yong-woo (guest)
2014	Quiz of God 4	Lee Hwan-seung (guest, episode 6)
2014	Golden Tower	Super landlord
2015	It's OK	
2015	Schoolgirl Detectives	Kyung Jang-hyun (guest)
2016	Tomorrow Boy	Myung-soo
2017	Missing 9	soldier (guest)

=== Variety show ===
Year	Title	Notes
2012	Roller Coaster - Season 2	Cast member
2013	King of Boss	
2013	World Challenge - We Are Coming	

=== Music video appearances ===
Year	Title	Role
2002	"Forever"	G.Gorilla
2003	"Something Special"	Jang Yeon-joo

== Theater ==
Year	Title	Role
2007	Magic Time	

== Discography ==
Album information	Track listing
Yes Man: Single; Artist: Yes Men (Park Hyo-jun, Baek Bong-ki); Released: February 19, 2013; Label: S.P.Y, Ato Entertainment	Track listing: 1. Yes Man (feat. Weekend); 2. Yes Man (Inst.)
