= Kim Kyu-chul =

South Korean actor (born 1960)

- Born: April 6, 1960 (age 66); Yangju, Uijeongbu, Gyeonggi Province, South Korea
- Education: Seoul Art College - Theater
- Occupation: Actor
- Years active: 1984–present
- Spouse: Yoo Sook
- Children: 2 sons

Korean name
- Hangul: 김규철
- Hanja: 金圭哲
- RR: Gim Gyucheol
- MR: Kim Kyuch'ŏl

Kim Kyu-chul (born April 6, 1960) is a South Korean actor. Kim spent more than a decade as a stage actor before he made his onscreen breakthrough in 1993 with Im Kwon-taek's Seopyeonje, considered one of the classics of Korean cinema. Kim became most active in television, starring in dramas such as When I Miss You (1993) and Resurrection (2005).

== Filmography ==
=== Television series ===
Year	Title	Role
1993	When I Miss You	
1993	Good Morning, Yeong-dong	Cha Jung-bo
1995	West Palace	King Gwanghae
1995	Your Voice	Seok-young
1995	Wonji-dong Blues	Byung-ha
1996	Start	
1996	Hometown Legends "Butterfly's Lament"	Scholar from Namsan
1996	MBC Best Theater "Me, 28 Years Old and Unmarried"	
1996	Drama Game "Can I Go to the Post Office to Find a Lost Love?"	
1997	Your Daughter, My Son	
1997	MBC Best Theater "Amnesia Story"	Chul-woo
1997	Hometown Legends "Frost Falling in May"	Sa-ddo
1997	Light in the Field	Byung-ki
1997	Spring Day	
1997	When She Beckons	
1998	Horse's Hill	
1998	Paper Crane	Won Hee-jae
1998	Hong Gil-dong	King Jungjong
1998	Like Wind, Like Waves	
1998	Hope Inn	
1998	The Advocate	
1999	MBC Best Theater "Head of Dried Walleye Pollack"	Third
1999	Kuk-hee	
1999	Invitation	
1999	Rising Sun, Rising Moon	
1999	TV Literature "When He Stopped"	Sae-il
1999	Song-hwa	
1999	MBC Best Theater "Holiday"	Chul-joo
2000	Foolish Love	Jung-gook
2000	Novel: The Mind of Governing the People	Jeong Yak-jeon
2000	I Want to Keep Seeing You	Kim Jae-yeol
2000	Promise	Chae Ki-sub
2001	Delicious Proposal	Park Young-guk
2001	Orient Theatre	Shin Bool-chool
2001	Way of Living: Couple	Ki Sun-woo
2001	Stock Flower	
2001	Flower Story (Plum Sonata)	
2002	Love	Seon-jae
2002	Magic Kid Masuri	Ma Poong-woon
2002	Sunshine Hunting	Kang In-wook
2002	Loving You	Supervisor Kang
2002	Since We Met	Jo Nam-ki
2002	MBC Best Theater "U-Turn in Sinchon"	Driving school instructor Kyung-seok
2002	Drama City "Hong-si"	Father
2003	Age of Warriors	King Uijong
2003	Over the Green Fields	Sung Joon-geol
2003	Land of Wine	Kil-soo
2003	Wedding Gift	
2003	Full Moon Santa	In-tae
2003	Not Divorced	Byun Hak-soo
2003	Rosemary	
2003	Drama City "Last Present"	Dong-jin
2004	Drama City "My Cellphone Is Off"	Section chief Pi
2004	Traveling Women	Oh Yoon-ho
2004	Immortal Admiral Yi Sun-sin	Im Chun-soo
2005	Loveholic	Teacher
2005	Dangerous Love	Kim In-soo
2005	TV Literature "When Buckwheat Flowers Bloom"	Saengwon Heo
2005	Drama City "Treasure Island of Riddles"	Sung-jae
2005	Resurrection	Choi Dong-chan
2006	Drama City "The Thin Line Between Love and Hate"	Hitman K
2006	Bad Family	Ha In-soo
2006	Drama City "The Stars Shine Brightly"	Man
2006	Hwarang Fighter Maru	Kim Jin-ho
2006	Drama City "Fog Street"	
2006	Drama City "Urban Legends, Stories That Aren't Scary"	Jung-man (episode: "비상구, 하차 그리고 피크닉")
2006	Dae Jo-yeong	Shin-hong
2006	Fugitive Lee Doo-yong	Jang Doo-sik
2006	My Love Dal-ja	Kang Young-sub
2006	Drama City "Baby Singing a Lullaby"	Dr. Choi Myung-hwan
2007	The Return of Shim Chung	Deputy Baek
2007	HDTV Literature "A Dwarf Launches a Little Ball"	
2007	HDTV Literature "My Bloody Lover"	(episode 1: "Nude Photos")
2007	Lucifer	Cha Gwang-doo
2007	Several Questions That Make Us Happy	Seon-jae's older brother
2008	Strongest Chil Woo	Choe Won-sik (cameo)
2008	Hometown Legends "Gisaeng House Ghost Story"	Sa-ddo
2008	The Kingdom of the Winds	Myung-jin
2008	Don't Be Swayed	Park Hyung-chul
2009	Partner	Prosecutor (cameo, episode 16)
2009	Hot Blood	Director Yoon
2009	Hometown Legends "The Grudge Island"	Yoon Hong-guk
2010	Stars Falling from the Sky	Jung In-goo
2010	The Great Merchant	Steward Oh
2010	Legend of the Patriots	Battalion commander (cameo)
2010	Grudge: The Revolt of Gumiho	Steward Oh
2010	Freedom Fighter, Lee Hoe-young	Bureau chief of Asahi Shimbun Shanghai
2010	Giant	Noh Gap-soo (cameo)
2010	Ang Shim Jung	Min Ki-chul
2010	The President	Baek Chan-ki
2010	Thank You for Making Me Smile	
2011	Detectives in Trouble	Jo Sang-tae
2011	Baby Faced Beauty	Lee So-young's father
2011	Gwanggaeto, The Great Conqueror	Seol Do-an
2011	Spy Myung-wol	
2011	Insu, the Queen Mother	Lee Hyun-ro
2011	Padam Padam	Prosecutor Joo
2012	Kimchi Family	Jung Sung-min (cameo)
2012	Love, My Love	Yeo Sam-choo
2012	Bridal Mask	Woo Byung-joon
2012	KBS Drama Special "Re-Memory"	Detective Seo
2012	May Queen	Park Gi-chool
2013	That Winter, the Wind Blows	Jang Sung
2013	Blooded Palace: The War of Flowers	Shim Ki-won
2013	Don't Look Back: The Legend of Orpheus	Jo Eui-seon
2014	Golden Cross	Park Hee-seo
2014	Blade Man	Jo Bong-gu
2015	The Jingbirok: A Memoir of Imjin War	Toyotomi Hideyoshi
2015	The Missing	Park Jung-do
2015	Hello Monster	Park Young-chul (guest, episode 5)
2015	The Merchant: Gaekju 2015	Kim Bo-hyun
2016	Shopping King Louie	Baek Sun-goo
2017	Manhole	Yang Koo-gil's father
2019	The Banker	
2019-2020	Unasked Family	Kang Kyu-cheol
2023-2024	Live Your Own Life	Kang Jin-beom

=== Film ===
Year	Title	Role
1993	Seopyeonje	Dong-ho
1995	Thief and a Poet	Bin-ha
2003	The Road Taken	
2006	Righteous Ties	Han-wook
2007	Going by the Book	Senior colleague Kim (cameo)
2011	The Show (documentary)	Himself (cameo)

== Theater ==
Year	Title	Role
1996	Oliver!	

== Awards and nominations ==
Year	Award	Category	Nominated work	Result
1993	4th Chunsa Film Art Awards	Best New Actor	Seopyeonje	Won
1993	31st Grand Bell Awards	Best New Actor	Seopyeonje	Won
1995	KBS Drama Awards	Best New Actor	When I Miss You	Won
1995	KBS Drama Awards	Popularity Award, Actor	When I Miss You	Won
1999	KBS Drama Awards	Excellence Award, Actor		Won
2005	KBS Drama Awards	Best Supporting Actor	Resurrection	Nominated
2009	KBS Drama Awards	Best Actor in a One-Act Drama/Special	The Grudge Island	Won
2011	KBS Drama Awards	Best Supporting Actor	Detectives in Trouble, Gwanggaeto, The Great Conqueror	Nominated
2013	2nd APAN Star Awards	Acting Award, Actor	That Winter, the Wind Blows	Nominated
