= Jung Dong-hwan =

South Korean actor (born 1949)

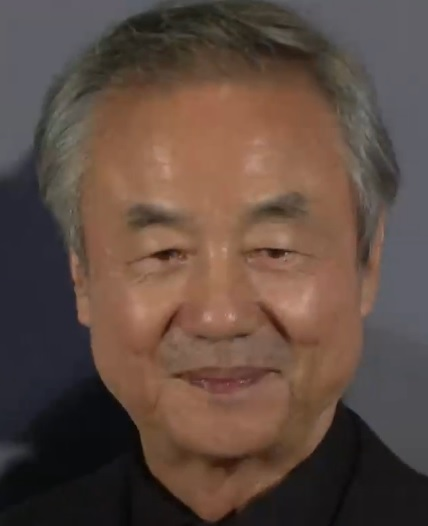
- Jung in November 2022
- Born: August 5, 1949 (age 77); Gimje, North Jeolla Province, South Korea
- Occupation: Actor
- Years active: 1969–present
- Spouse: Jung Yoon-sun
- Children: 3 (including Jung Ha-nui)
- Honours: Bo-gwan Order of Cultural Merit (2025)

Korean name
- Hangul: 정동환
- Hanja: 鄭東煥
- RR: Jeong Donghwan
- MR: Chŏng Tonghwan

Jung Dong-hwan (Korean: 정동환; Hanja: 鄭東煥; born August 5, 1949) is a South Korean actor. Jung began his career in theater, then was most active in Korean cinema in the 1980s, with leading roles in Late Autumn (1982), Jung-kwang's Nonsense (1986), and A Top Knot on Montmartre (1987). As he grew older, Jung appeared more frequently in television, notably in The Last Station (1987), Three Kim Generation (1998), Winter Sonata (2002), Rustic Period (2002), Immortal Admiral Yi Sun-sin (2004) and Freedom Fighter, Lee Hoe-young (2010).

== Early years and education ==
Jung was born in Gimje, as second and youngest son. He spent his childhood in Huam-dong, Seoul with his mother and his older brother. He proudly remember as being one of the first visitors to Namsan Library when it opened.

Since he was young, Jung enjoyed watching plays. His first experience watching play was students performances from the theater department of Joongdong High School. At that time, there weren't as many theatre performances as now, he was seeing only one or two plays a year. After repeating a year, he enrolled in Joongdong High School with the sole intention of pursuing theater. At that time, the theater class at Jungdong High School was unparalleled among high school theater classes. Luckily, starting from his first year, he was given lead roles. The first play he ever performed was an adaptation of Augusta Gregory's "When the East is Turning Gray," which was adapted by the renowned playwright Noh Kyung-sik.

In the second semester, he entered the drama class. In 1965, when he was a freshman in high school. He participated in the National High School Male and Female Student Theater Competition with a play called 'Sunrise' and he won the Best Acting Award. The competition's host was Dongnang Yoo Chi-jin (1905-1974).

After failed his college entrance exam, Jung decided to enter the Seoul Academy of Dramatic Arts, founded by Dongnang Yoo Chi-jin, (Note: Seoul Institute of the Arts was established by Dongnang Arts Foundation. Dongnang Arts Foundation has its roots in the Korean Theater Research Institute founded by a scholar "Dongnang" Yoo Chi-jin in 1958. In 1958, Yoo Chi-jin founded the Korean Theater Research Institute. Dongnang also built the affiliated Drama Center (Namsan Arts Center) and Theater Library in 1962. In the same year, he also started the Korean Theater Academy, which has become what is today Department of Theater and Film of Seoul Institute of the Arts.) which was predecessor of today Department of Theater and Film of Seoul Institute of the Arts. Yoo gave Jung a full scholarship on the condition that he work as a stage manager in Dongnang Repertoire Theater Company. He embarked on his acting journey from the ground up, learning from esteemed theater figures like Lee Ho-jae and Jeon Moo-song. As soon as he entered, young elite theatrical figures of the time, such as Yoo Deok-hyung, Ahn Min-soo, and Yoo Min-young, returned from studying abroad. Meeting them and getting to know a new theater culture was a big turning point in his life.

== Career ==
=== Early career ===
He made his professional debut in the play "Stranger" in 1969. However, his scholarship was later changed to a partial one, making it difficult for him to afford tuition fees. In the early 1970s, facing financial struggles, Jung decided to enlist in the military before completing his education and was deployed to the Vietnam War. He was served as a combat engineer. While the typical enlistment period was 12 months, Jung had to serve for 18 months due to the critical state of the military at the time. He was discharged in 1973 and returned home.

Despite having some money from his time in Vietnam, Jung couldn't resume his studies due to the challenging circumstances his family faced. The urgency to make a living took precedence. Upon his return, he took the 6th Dong-A Broadcasting Voice Actor Test and passed, triumphing over a competition ratio of 1000:1. He worked as a voice actor for only a year and a half before leaving his job at Dong-A Broadcasting.

In the following autumn, he traveled to Okinawa and worked as a sugarcane farm laborer. After saving some money during the few months he spent there, he returned to Korea. In 1975, he landed a role as Prince in the play "Prince of the Horse," which turned out to be a box office success and established him as an actor. However, he still couldn't sustain himself solely through theater work. Jung reminisced about his time doing manual labor in Okinawa, "The hourly wage was about the daily rate in Korea at the time, but I lived on the theater stage with the money I earned there, and when the money ran out, I went there again."

=== Screen debut, study abroad ===
Jung made his small screen debut in 1978 with the KBS drama "Wild Geese," where he showcased his acting talent. His outstanding performance in the drama earned him the prestigious Baeksang Award for New Actor.

In 1981, he starred alongside Kim Hye-ja in director Kim Soo-yong's film Late Autumn, which was released in 1982. He made his mark as lead actor.

Then in 1982, he flew to the United States to pursue his passion for acting and enrolled at the renowned Lee Strasberg Theatre and Film Institute, Los Angeles. Determined to finance his education, he took on a range of jobs, including working as a nighttime building cleaner, to support his acting studies.

In March 1985, he returned to small screen with TV Novel: The Sky at Daybreak. Followed by film Jung-kwang's Nonsense (1986), and A Top Knot on Montmartre (1987). Since then, Jung have been living without a break, going back and forth between TV, movies and plays, notably in The Last Station (1987).

In 1990, he portrayed Vladimir in Samuel Beckett's play Waiting for Godot for the first time. Despite being in his prime at the age of 41, the iconic absurd play posed a formidable challenge. When he first saw the script, he wondered, "Why is this in Korean but so difficult to read?" It was only after repeated rehearsals that he truly grasped the essence of the work. In October of that year, he performed Waiting for Godot in Beckett's homeland of Dublin, Ireland. The local media, The Irish Times, published an article on the top right of the front page, stating, "The wait was worthwhile for the arrival of Godot from the East."

Jung appeared more frequently in television, Three Kim Generation (1998), Winter Sonata (2002), Rustic Period (2002). In 2003 Jung acted the role of Edward Damson, famous English playwright, in the Korean premiere of Peter Shaffer's The Gift of the Gorgon.

Immortal Admiral Yi Sun-sin (2004) and Freedom Fighter, Lee Hoe-young (2010).

In June 2009, Jung reprise the role of Edward Damson, famous English playwright, in the Korean encore of Peter Shaffer's The Gift of the Gorgon. His intellectual wife, Helen, was played by Seo Yi-sook. It was performed from the 10th to the 21st at the Arko Arts Theatre in Daehak-ro, Seoul.

In 2013, Jeong played the role of poet Virgilius in Dante's Divine Comedy a play performed for the first time in Korea, at the Namsan National Theater on the 29th.

In 2015, for the first time in 25 years, Jeong met the audience again as Vladimir. He, Ahn Seok-hwan, Kim Myung-guk, Lee Ho-sung, and 13 famous actors who have gone through this work have come together. It is a place to commemorate the 45th anniversary of the premiere of play Waiting for Godot directed by Sanullim Theatre Company and the 30th anniversary of the opening of the small theatre Sanullim. Despite 50 years of acting skills, he has been in the practice room almost every day since the beginning of January.

In 2017, Jung appeared in the play The Brothers Karamazov, based a novel by Fyodor Dostoevsky. It became a hot topic with a total running time of 7 hours, and received a standing ovation from the audience for 20 minutes without a break. He said, "I wasn't confident every day if I could finish the performance properly and come down. I thought I didn't know when and what would happen from day to the end, but I believed that it was something I had to do to try until the end."

In 2019, Jang acted as Noh Joon-suk, in tvN fantasy drama Hotel del Luna, as hotel's general manager for 30 years. He considers Man-wol (played by Lee Ji-eun) as a sister, daughter and friend. Jung won Lifetime Achievement Award at 12th Korea Drama Awards for his role.

In 2021, Jung joined special performance of play The Brothers Karamazov to celebrate Dostoyevsky's 200th birthday. Also in 2021, Jung acted as Simeon Cheney in Pascal Quignard's first play In the Garden We Loved, winner of the 2018 Deauville 'Book and Music Award', based on the novel with the same name.

== Personal life ==
In 1982, Jung divorced his ex-wife before embarking on a journey to the United States. He flew to Los Angeles to pursue his passion for acting and enrolled at the renowned Lee Strasburg Theater Institute. Jung did manual labor to cover for his tuition and living cost.

It was in 1985 that he crossed paths with singer Jeong Yun-seon, introduced to him by a mutual friend. Jeong, a former 70s singer who had retired in the United States after her manager's death from leukemia, became a significant presence in Jung's life. Their engagement ceremony took place at the Palace Hotel on February 12, 1986, followed by their marriage in September of the same year. Their wedding was officiated by playwright Lee Hae-rang. Together, they have been blessed with one son and two daughters. Notably, their second daughter, Jung Ha-nui, has made a name for herself as a talented theater actress.

In an interview with Woman Chosun in 2014, Jung opened up about his personal struggles, disclosing that he had been dealing with panic disorder.

== Filmography ==
=== Film ===
Year	Title	Role
1982	Late Autumn	Min-gi
1986	Getting on the Elevator	Taek-gu
1986	Jung-kwang's Nonsense	Go Chang-ryul/Jung-kwang
1987	Blue Heart	
1987	A Top Knot on Montmartre	Jin-ho
1987	A Street Musician	Yoon-soo
1990	Going Out at Dawn	Jung-yong
1992	Mother's Field	Min Yong-chul
1993	The Scent at the Edge of the World	
1994	The Story of Two Women	
2001	The Rhapsody	Otan
2005	Wet Dreams 2	Oh Sung-eun's father (cameo)
2005	Murder, Take One	General manager Nam
2007	Seven Days	Kang Sang-man
2008	26 Years Diary	Lee Soo-hyun's father
2022	Ajoomma	Jung-su
2023	12.12: The Day	Choi Han-gyu

=== Television series ===
Year	Title	Role	Network
1978	Wild Geese		KBS
1979	Mrs. Cha's Village		KBS1
1979	Some Woman		
1980	Newlywed Woman		KBS2
1981	Horrifying Fantasies		KBS2
1982	Promised Land		KBS1
1982	Conditions of Love		KBS2
1982	Three Sisters		KBS1
1982	On Fire		KBS1
1985	KBS TV Novel: The Sky at Daybreak		KBS1
1985	Hometown	Dong-hyuk	KBS2
1985	Stars on the Prairie		KBS2
1987	KBS TV Novel: Love		KBS1
1987	The Last Station	Baek Sang-woo	MBC
1988	We Don't Know Either	Hyun Sang-ho	MBC
1989	Two Sunsets		KBS1
1989	Winter Mist	Kang Jin-woo	MBC
1989	Heaven's Order		KBS2
1989	An Angel's Choice		MBC
1990	Freezing Point		KBS2
1990	Are You Still Dreaming	Kim Hyuk-joo	KBS2
1990	The Land of Fire		KBS2
1991	Near the Valley	Hee-jo	KBS2
1991	Eyes of Dawn	Prosecutor Kim Seung-won	MBC
1991	Flowers That Never Wilt	Yoo Dong-soo	KBS1
1992	Listening to Mozart on Wednesdays	Jung In-tak	KBS2
1992	The Windy Forest		KBS2
1992	Trilogy of Mystery "Golden Section"		KBS2
1993	Whisky and Pork Ribs		KBS1
1993	Sisters		MBC
1993	Sorrowful Youth		KBS2
1993	The Faraway Ssongba River	Sergeant Kim Kwang-ho	SBS
1994	The Tragedy of Y		SBS
1994	Challenge	Min Dong-joon	MBC
1994	A Human Land		KBS2
1994	Oldest Sister	Seo Kang-wook	MBC
1995	Dazzling Dawn	Oh Kyung-seok	KBS1
1995	War and Love		MBC
1995	Thaw		SBS
1996	Until We Can Love		KBS2
1996	Colors "The Reason Gray Is Beautiful"	Seo-hoon	KBS2
1996	August Bride	Dr. Moon Do-il	SBS
1997	Where Women Dwell		KBS2
1997	Model		SBS
1997	Three Days of War		KBS1
1998	Three Kim Generation	Kim Jong-pil	SBS
1998	Purity		KBS2
1998	White Nights 3.98	Colonel Woo	SBS
1998	Winners	Lawyer Park Chan-min	SBS
1999	Kuk-hee	Min Young-jae	MBC
1999	KBS TV Novel: Bird	Dad	KBS1
1999	Encounter	Jang Moon-soo	KBS2
2000	Love Story "Rose"	Jong-gu	SBS
2000	Look Back in Anger	Detective subsection chief	KBS2
2000	KBS TV Novel: Dandelion		KBS1
2000	Autumn in My Heart	Professor Yoon	KBS2
2000	Roll of Thunder	Yi Dal	KBS2
2001	Legend		SBS
2002	Winter Sonata	Kim Jin-woo	KBS2
2002	The Dawn of the Empire	Choe Ji-mong	KBS1
2002	Loving You	Manager Jin	KBS2
2002	Rustic Period	Choi Dong-yeol	SBS
2003	Over the Green Fields	Chairman Shin	KBS2
2003	Drama City "For William"	Yong-joo	KBS2
2003	Screen	Park Jin-sub	SBS
2003	Pearl Necklace	Kim Jae-man	KBS2
2003	So, Neighbors		iTV
2003	Pretty Woman	Bang Jae-ha	MBC
2004	Magic	Oh Jung-man	SBS
2004	Immortal Admiral Yi Sun-sin	Yun Doo-su	KBS1
2004	When a Man Is in Love	Chairman Kang	SBS
2004	Kaikyo wo Wataru Violin (The Violin Across the Channel)	Jin Jae-ki	Fuji TV
2005	Drama City "Dad's Having an Affair"	Kang Ji-man	KBS2
2005	Loveholic	Kim Soo-bong	KBS2
2005	Lovers in Prague	Ji Kyung-hwan	SBS
2006	Tree of Heaven	Yoon Soo-ha	SBS
2006	Spring Waltz	Yoon Myung-hoon	KBS2
2006	A Woman's Choice	Kim Chang-an	KBS2
2006	One Fine Day	Park Jin-kwon	MBC
2006	Yeon Gaesomun	Yeon Taesu	SBS
2007	Mermaid Story	Nam Soo-in's father	TVN
2007	Heaven & Earth	Yoon Jae-doo	KBS1
2007	Lucifer	Kang Dong-hyun	KBS2
2007	How to Meet a Perfect Neighbor	Go Chang-shik	SBS
2007	New Heart	Park Jae-hyun	MBC
2008	The Great King, Sejong	Jo Mal-saeng	KBS1
2009	The Return of Iljimae	Choi Myung-kil	MBC
2009	Can Anyone Love	Hong Min-kyu	SBS
2009	The Accidental Couple	Kim Jung-wook	KBS2
2009	Hot Blood	Company president Song	KBS2
2009	I'll Give You Everything	Cha Soon-chul	KBS2
2010	The Reputable Family	Jang Gil-taek	KBS1
2010	Pasta	Choi Hyun-wook's mentor chef	MBC
2010	A Man Called God	Lee Hyeong-seob	MBC
2010	Dong Yi	Oh Tae-suk	MBC
2010	Three Sisters	Kim Won-bin	SBS
2010	Freedom Fighter, Lee Hoe-young	Lee Hoe-yeong	KBS1
2010	The President	Han Dae-woon (cameo)	KBS2
2011	While You Were Sleeping	Chae Dae-pil	SBS
2011	The Princess' Man	King Munjong	KBS2
2011	Scent of a Woman	Kim Dong-myung	SBS
2012	Feast of the Gods	Ha Young-bum	MBC
2012	Korean Peninsula	Oh Chang-il	TV Chosun
2012	Phantom	Kim Seok-joon	SBS
2012	Dream of the Emperor	Kim Yongchun	KBS1
2012	My Kids Give Me a Headache	Ha In-chul's father in-law	jTBC
2013	You Are the Best!	Lee Chang-hoon (guest)	KBS2
2013	Nine	Choi Jin-chul	TVN
2013	I Can Hear Your Voice	Seo Dae-seok	SBS
2013	Ruby Ring	Bae Chang-geun	KBS2
2013	The Heirs	Kim Nam-yun	SBS
2014	You're All Surrounded	Yoo Moon-bae	SBS
2014	Endless Love	Kim Geon-pyo	SBS
2014	Love & Secret	Han Pan-suk	KBS2
2014	Punch	Kim Sang-min	SBS
2015	The Jingbirok: A Memoir of Imjin War		KBS1
2015	Mask	Byun Dae-sung	SBS
2015	This is My Love	Park Hyun-soo's father	jTBC
2016	Uncontrollably Fond	Yoon Sung-ho	KBS2
2016	Night Light	Jang Tae-joon	MBC
2017	The Bride of Habaek	Chairman Shin Dong-Man	TVN
2017	Hospital Ship		MBC
2018	About Time	Lee Seon-moon	TVN
2019	The Fiery Priest	Lee Young-joon	SBS
2019	Hotel del Luna	Manager Noh	TVN
2020	Money Game	Chae Byeong-hak	tvN
2020	The Game: Towards Zero	Teacher Baek	MBC
2021	Mine		tvN
2022	If You Wish Upon Me	Yoon	KBS2
2022	Unlock My Boss	Oh Young-geun	ENA
2023	Brain Works	Hwang Dong-woo	KBS2

=== Variety show ===
Year	Title	Notes
2013	How to Eat and Live Well	Host

=== Theater ===
List of stage play(s)
Year	Title		Role	Theater	Date	Ref.
Year	English	Korean	Role	Theater	Date	Ref.
1969	Stranger		—N/a			
1975	Prince of Horse	마의 태자	Prince	Culture and Art Hall Grand Theater		
1977	Items of expense	비목	Commentary	Cecil Theater Theater Hall	10.21 to 10.26	
1977	Crown Prince Ha Myeol	하멸태자 (햄릿)	King Mi-hyul	Namsan Arts Center Drama Center	10.20 to 10.27	
1977	Joan of Arc			Ryu Gwan-sun Memorial Hall		
1977	Free Like a Butterfly	나비처럼 자유롭게	Don Baker	National Theater Small Theater	7.6 to 7.11	
1978	Free Like a Butterfly	나비처럼 자유롭게	Don Baker	Cecil Theater Theater Hall	1.3 to 1.10	
1978	Romulus the Great - a non-historical historical comedy	로물루스 대제 - 비역사적인 역사적 희극	Philax	Sejong Center for the Performing Arts Annex	2.8 to 2.13	
1978	Glass Menagerie	유리동물원		Cecil Theater Theater Hall	August 22 to 28	
1979	Testimony of a Woman Arrested for Immoral Behavior	부도덕한 행위로 체포된 어느 여인의 증언	Erol Philander	Samilro Warehouse Theater	April 3 and 4	
1981	(5th) Korean Theater Festival: Bison	(제5회) 대한민국연극제: 들소	The One Trapped by a Bison	Culture and Art Hall Grand Theater	8.31 to 9.5	
1981	Bison	들소	The One Trapped by a Bison	Sejong Center for the Performing Arts Annex	10.15 to 10.19	
1982	Woyzeck	보이체크		Culture and Art Hall Small Theater	5.25 ~ 6.6	
1983	The Son of Man	사람의 아들	Min Yo-seop			
1986	Long Day's Journey into Night	밤으로의 긴 여로	James Tyrone	Culture and Art Hall Grand Theater	September 28 to October 2	
1987	The Son of Man	사람의 아들	Min Yo-seop	Exclusive Theater for Experimental Theater	5.7 ~ 5.31	
1989	Tragedy of Foscari	포스카리가의 비극	commentary	Sejong Center for the Performing Arts	5.29 ~ 1989.5.31	
1989	Cow	암소	Gorat House	Culture and Art Hall Grand Theater	9.1 ~ 9.6	
1990	Waiting for Godot	고도를기다리며	Vladimir	Project Arts Center in Dublin	October 1 to 3	
1990	Waiting for Godot	고도를기다리며	Vladimir	Sanwoolim Small Theater	November 1 to December 2	
1991	As if I saw a flower in the winter solstice	동지섣달 꽃 본 듯이		Culture and Art Hall Small Theater	12.23 ~ 12.30	
1992	For Aurora	오로라를 위하여	Oh Yoo-seok	Gunsan Civic Center	9.23 ~ 28	
1992	(16th) Seoul Theater Festival: For Aurora	(제16회) 대한민국연극제: 오로라를 위하여	Oh Yoo-seok	Culture and Art Hall Grand Theater		
1993	Doctor Zhivago	닥터 지바고		Culture and Art Hall Small Theater	11.27 ~ 12.10	
1995	Last Dance with Me	마지막 춤은 나와함께		Culture and Art Hall Grand Theater	3.30 ~ 4.9	
1995	Bloody Marriage	피의 결혼		Seoul Arts Center Jayu Theater	5.13 ~ 5.21	
1997	Equus	에쿠우스	Martin Dysart	Culture and Art Center Seoul Dure Theater	3.19 ~ 4.20	
1997	Guest from the South	남에서 오신 손님		Culture and Art Hall Small Theater	September 2 to 15	
1997	Guest from the South	남에서 오신 손님		Gunsan Civic Center	October 29	
1998	Rise	출세기		Daehakro Culture and Arts Center Theater Grand Theater		
1999	(23rd) Seoul Theater Festival : Lady Macbeth	(제23회) 서울연극제 : 레이디 맥베스	doctor (Macbeth)	Culture and Art Hall Small Theater	October 2 to 15	
2000	Lady Macbeth	레이디맥베스	doctor (Macbeth)	Seoul Arts Center Jayu Small Theater	2000.5.20 ~ 2000.6.18	
2001	Glorious Escape	영광의 탈출	Park Il-gook (non-converted jockey)	Seoul Arts Center CJ Towol Theater	December 21 to 30	
2002	Cabaret	캬바레	Cliff Bradshaw	Seoul Arts Center CJ Towol Theater	March 19 to 24	
2002	Lady Macbeth	레이디맥베스	Doctor/Macbeth	Seoul Arts Center Jayu Theater	June 8 to 23	
2002	A Streetcar Named Desire	욕망이라는 이름의 전차	Friendship Appearance	Cultural Arts Promotion Agency Arts Theater Grand Theater	July 6 to 17	
2003	The Gift of the Gorgon	고곤의 선물	Edward Damson	Dongsoong Art Center Dongsoong Hall	November 20 to 30	
2004	The Seagull	갈매기	Pjotr Nikolayevich Sorin	SEoul Arts Center CJ Towol Theater	April 14 to May 2	
2004	Romulus the Great	로물루스 대제	Romulus Augustulus	Sejong Center for the Performing Arts		
2004	Padam Padam Padam	빠담 빠담 빠담	Jean Cocteau	KEPCO Art Center	November 25 to December 5	
2005	A Story of Two Knights and the World of Knight Errantry	세상을 편력하는 두 기사 이야기	doctor	Cultural Arts Promotion Agency Arts Theater Small Theater	March 24 to April 10	
2005	Equus	에쿠우스	Martin Dysart	Hakjeon Blue Small Theatre	September 9 to October 30	
2007	The Crucible	시련	Reverend Samuel Parris	Seoul Arts Center CJ Towol Theater	April 11 to 29	
2008	Lady Macbeth	레이디맥베스	Doctor/Macbeth	National Theater of Korea Haeoreum Theater	March 21 to April 13	
2008	Brothers Were Brave					
2008	Scent of Love	침향 (沈香)	Taek-seong	Arko Arts Center	June 11 to 29	
2008	The Gift of the Gorgon	고곤의 선물	Edward Damson	Namsan Arts Center Drama Center	Nov 18–23	
2009	Where and What Shall We Meet	어디서 무엇이 되어 만나랴		National Theater of Korea Haeoreum Theater	July 10 to 26	
2009	The Seafarer	뱃사람	Mr. Lockhart	Arko Arts Center Theater	October 8 to 18	
2009	The Gift of the Gorgon	고곤의 선물	Edward Damson	Namsan Arts Center	Nov 18 to 23	
2010	Lady Macbeth	레이디맥베스	Doctor/Macbeth	National Theater of Korea Haeoreum Theater	June 10 to 20	
2010	Namu (Tree)	나무		Arko Arts Center Theater	November 9 and 10	
2011	Oedipus	오이디푸스	Oedipus	Myeongdong Arts Center	January 20 to February 13	
2011	Oedipus	오이디푸스	Oedipus	Myeongdong Arts Center	November 8 to 27	
2012	The Cherry Orchard	벚꽃동산	Firs	Sejong Center for the Performing Arts Annex	October 12 to 28	
2013	Lady Macbeth 15th Anniversary Performance	레이디맥베스 15주년 기념공연	Doctor/Macbeth	Daehakro Arts Center Theater Grand Theater	Juni 6 to 16	
2013	Lady Macbeth 15th Anniversary Performance	레이디맥베스 15주년 기념공연	Doctor/Macbeth	Sarasae Theater in Aram Nuri, Goyang	July 10 to 14	
2013–2014	Dante's Divine Comedy	2013–2014 국립레퍼토리시즌 - 단테의 신곡	Virgil	National Theater of Korea Haeoreum Theater	November 2 to 9	
2014	SAC CUBE 2014 - Mephisto	SAC CUBE 2014 - 메피스토	Faust	Seoul Arts Center CJ Towol Theater	April 4–19	
2014	Dante'sDivine Comedy	단테 신곡 지옥편	Virgil	National Theater of Korea Haeoreum Theater	November 2 to 9	
2015	Waiting for Godot	고도를기다리며	Vladimir	Sanwoolim Small Theater	March 12 to May 17	
2015	Typhoon Story	태풍기담서울	Tae-hwan	Ansan Culture and Arts Center Dalmaji Theater	October 16 to 17	
2015	Typhoon Story	태풍기담서울	Tae-hwan	Namsan Arts Center Drama Center	October 24 to November 8	
2016	Hamlet	햄릿	Polonius	National Theater of Korea Haeoreum Theater	July 12 August 7	
2016	Soldier's Story	병사이야기	Narrator	Gapyeong Culture & Arts Center	September 3	
2016	Lady Macbeth	레이디맥베스	Doctor/Macbeth	Umyeondang National Gugak Center	December 21 to 30	
2017	The Brothers Karamazov	대심문관과 파우스트	Dostoevsky, Elder Joshima, Grand Interrogation, Foodie, and Lawyer	Daehakro Arts Center Theater Grand Theater		
2018	Heisenberg	하이젠버그	Alex	Doosan Arts Center Grand Theater	April 24 to May 20	
2019	The Hour We Knew Nothing of Each Other	우리가 서로 알 수 없었던 시간		Sogang University Mary Hall Grand Theater	February 20 to 24	
2019	Waiting for Godot	고도를기다리며	Vladimir	Myeongdong Arts Center		
2020	The Grand Inquisitor and Faust	대심문관과 파우스트	Fyodor Dostoevsky	Dongguk University Lee Hae-rang Arts Theater	October 22 to November 8	
2021	Dante's Divine Comedy	단테 신곡 지옥편	Virgil	Daehakro Arts Center Theater Grand Theater	May 7 to 16	
2021	In the garden we loved	우리가 사랑했던 정원에서	Simian	Sejong Arts Center S Theater	June 22 to July 4	
2021	The Hour We Knew Nothing of Each Other	우리가 서로 알 수 없었던 시간		Oil Tank Cultural Space	August 14 to 22	
2021	The Brothers Karamazov	대심문관과 파우스트	Dostoevsky, Elder Joshima, Grand Interrogation, Foodie, and Lawyer	Daehakro Arts Center Theater Grand Theater	October 12 to 31	
2022	Hamlet	햄릿	Polonius	National Theater Haeoreum Theater	July 13 – August 13	
2022	The Two Popes	두 교황	Pope Francis	KEPCO Art Center	August 30 to October 30	
2022	Crazy Days	미치던 날 의정부	Shaman	Uijeongbu Cultural Center Literature Theater	November 15 to 16	
2023	Tolstoy's Confessions Conversation with Anna Karenina	톨스토이 참회록 안나 카레니나와의 대화	Leo Tolstoy	Hongik University Daehangno Arts Center	March 17 to April 16	

== Accolades ==
=== Awards and nominations ===
Year	Award	Category	Nominated work	Result	Ref.
1965	National Drama Contest	Best Actor	Sunrise	Won	
1979	15th Baeksang Arts Awards	Best New Actor (TV)	Wild Geese	Won	
1993	29th Baeksang Arts Awards	Best Actor (Theater)	For Aurora	Won	
1997	21st Seoul Theater Festival	Best Actor	Guests from South Korea	Won	
1999	25th Young-hee Prize for Theater	Recipient	—	Won	
2001	2nd Kim Dong-hoon Prize for Theater	Recipient	—	Won	
2006	Seoul Institute of the Arts Alumni Association	Light of Life Award	Jung Dong-hwan	Won	
2008	1st Korea Theater Awards	Best Actor	The Gift of the Gorgon	Won	
2009	19th Lee Hae-rang Theater Award	Theater Award	—	Won	
2010	3rd Korea Drama Awards	Best Supporting Actor	Dong Yi	Won	
2019	KBS Drama Awards	Best Actor in a One-Act/Special/Short Drama	Freedom Fighter, Lee Hoe-young	Nominated	
2019	12th Korea Drama Awards	Lifetime Achievement Award	Hotel del Luna	Won	
2019	9th Beautiful Artist Award	Theater Actor	The Time We Didn't Know Each Other; Waiting for Godot	Won	
2022	59th Golden Horse Awards	Best Supporting Actor	Ajoomma	Nominated	

=== State honors ===
Name of country, year given, and name of honor
Country	Award ceremony or Organization	Year	Honor or Award	Ref.
South Korea	Korean Popular Culture and Arts Awards (Note: "Korea Culture and Arts Awards," established in 1969 hosted annually by Ministry of Culture, Sports and Tourism.)	2016	Presidential Commendation	
South Korea	Korean Popular Culture and Arts Awards	2025	Bogwan Order of Cultural Merit	
