= Park Hyo-jun =

South Korean actor

- Born: June 12, 1980 (age 46); South Korea
- Other name: Park Hyo-joon
- Education: Joongbu University - Theater and Film Studies
- Occupation: Actor
- Years active: 2003–present
- Agent: Grim Company

Korean name
- Hangul: 박효준
- RR: Bak Hyojun
- MR: Pak Hyojun

Park Hyo-jun (born June 12, 1980) is a South Korean actor.

== Filmography ==
=== Film ===
- A Wintering (short film, 2003)
- My Tutor Friend (2003)
- Once Upon a Time in High School (2004)
- Love, So Divine (2004)
- The Twins (2005)
- Princess Aurora (2005)
- My Girl and I (2005)
- The Legend of Seven Cutter (2006)
- A Dirty Carnival (2006)
- To Sir, with Love (2006)
- Bank Attack (2007)
- A Ghost's Story (2008)
- Where Are You Going? (2009)
- Camellia "Love for Sale" (2010)
- R2B: Return to Base (2012)
- Red Family (2013)
- Mr. Perfect (2014)
- The Stone (2014)
- Northern Limit Line (2015)

=== Television series ===
- Jang Gil-san (SBS, 2004)
- Hello My Teacher (SBS, 2005)
- Loveholic (KBS2, 2005)
- Time Between Dog and Wolf (MBC, 2007)
- The Woman Who Still Wants to Marry (MBC, 2010)
- Golden House (tvN, 2010)
- Lie to Me (SBS, 2011)
- Vampire Prosecutor (OCN, 2011)
- Glory Jane (KBS2, 2011)
- Bachelor's Vegetable Store (Channel A, 2011)
- Man from the Equator (KBS2, 2012)
- Ji Woon-soo's Stroke of Luck (TV Chosun, 2012)
- Drama Special "The Whereabouts of Noh Sook-ja" (KBS2, 2012)
- Blue Tower (tvN, 2013) (guest appearance, episode 11)
- Stranger (SBS, 2013)
- Can We Fall in Love, Again? (jTBC, 2014)
- Inspiring Generation (KBS2, 2014)
- Big Man (KBS2, 2014)
- Bad Guys (OCN, 2014)
- The Vampire Detective (OCN, 2016) (guest appearance, episode 3)

=== Variety show ===
- Treasure Island (MBN, 2013)
- World Challenge - Here We Go (SBS, 2013)
- Star Face-off (SBS, 2014)

== Theater ==
- Magic Time (2007)
- Hamlet
- Guys and Dolls

== Discography ==
- "Yes Man" (duet with Baek Bong-ki) (single, 2013)
