= Kim Kap-soo =

South Korean actor (born 1957)

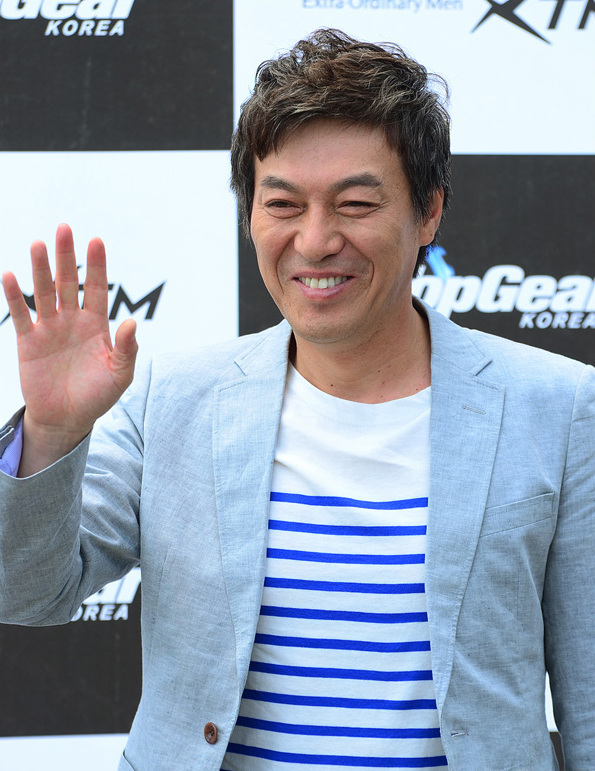
- Kim in 2011
- Born: April 7, 1957 (age 69); Seoul, South Korea
- Occupation: Actor
- Years active: 1977–present
- Agent: HUNUS Creative

Korean name
- Hangul: 김갑수
- Hanja: 金甲洙
- RR: Gim Gapsu
- MR: Kim Kapsu
- Website: Official website

Kim Kap-soo (Korean: 김갑수; born April 7, 1957) is a South Korean actor. Since his acting debut in 1977, Kim has had a long career on the stage, in television dramas and film. In addition to acting full-time, he also has his own master class acting studio.

== Career ==
Kim Kap-soo began his acting career in 1977 as the first generation of the Hyundai Theater.

Kim Kap-soo gained recognition for his outstanding performance in the 1984 play "The Silence of the Master," which portrayed the life of Han Yong-un (Monk Manhae). Kim dedicatedly portrayed the role of Han Yong-un for three consecutive months at the Seoul Sesil Theater.

He further solidified his reputation with roles in movies like The Taebaek Mountain and "Horrible Love." In 2000, in the KBS1 drama Taejo Wang Geon, Kim Gap-soo shines as a loyal royal scribe, showcasing his talent and establishing himself as a standout in the series.

He, who is also the head of the theater company 'Actors' World', took time between his appearances in movies and dramas to perform the charity play 'Tongbuk-eo' for the underprivileged in 10 cities across the country, including Incheon, Gwacheon, and Pyeongchang, at the end of 2008. He found the source of his strength to be a 'veteran' in movies and TV dramas in his 25 years of theater experience.

== Filmography ==
=== Film ===
Year	Title	Role	Notes/Ref.
1994	The Taebaek Mountains	Yeom Sang-gu	
1995	My Dear Keum-hong	Yi Sang	
1996	Their Last Love Affair	Young-min	
1997	Do the Right Thing	Kim Dal-se	
1997	He Asked Me If I Knew Zither	Soo	
1999	Fin de Siecle	Choi Doo-seob	
2001	Bungee Jumping of Their Own	sculpture professor	cameo
2001	This is Law	Park Shi-jong	
2002	KT	Kim Chang-won	
2002	Four Toes	Bacchus	
2003	A Tale of Two Sisters	Bae Moo-hyeon	
2003	Mutt Boy	Chul-min's father	
2004	He Was Cool	Ye-won's father	
2004	Spin Kick	principal	cameo
2004	Flying Boys	supervising teacher	Cameo
2005	Typhoon	NIS director	
2005	She's on Duty	Cha Young-jae	
2006	Detective Mr. Gong	supervisor Jo	Cameo
2009	Where Are You Going?	father	
2010	I Saw the Devil	planning team deputy head	Cameo
2010	Iris: The Movie	Yoo Jung-hoon	
2011	The Showdown	senior vassal	
2011	The Last Blossom	Jung Chul	
2013	Blood and Ties	Jung Son-man	
2014	My Brilliant Life	Dae-soo's father	Cameo
2015	Love Forecast	Kang Joon-soo's father	Cameo
2017	Steel Rain	Ri Tae-han	
2022	Hot Blooded	Son Young-gam	
2022	Hot Blood: The Original	Son Young-gam	Extended version

=== Television series ===
Year	Title	Role	Notes/Ref.
1988	Jackfruit		
1989	And So Flows History	independence fighter Jang Seok-ha	
1991	In Search of a Nest		
1991	Literature Theater "That Deep Blue River"	Tae-soo	
1992	The Three Kingdoms	Sung Choong	
1993	A Powerful Sword		
1993	Third Republic	Hwang Tae-sung	
1994	Lee Seon-pung’s Underworld Excursion	Lee Seon-poong	
1995	Dazzling Dawn	Lee Dong-in	
1996	6.25 Drama "War of Guhari"	army officer	
1998	The King and the Queen	Kwon Ram	
1999	House Above the Waves	Moon-soo	
1999	Sad Temptation	Seo Moon-gi	
2000	Taejo Wang Geon	Jong Gan	
2001	Orient Theatre	Choi Deok-kyun	
2001	Stepmother	Heo Dong-taek	
2001	Special Warrant 203	Kang Young-joon	
2002	Drama City "Beautiful Youth"	teacher	
2002	Sunshine Hunting		
2002	Age of Innocence	Tae-seok's father	
2003	Age of Warriors	Choe Chung-heon	
2003	TV Literature "A River Flows Through Everyone's Hearts"	Gukjang	
2003	Drama City "Her Purity"	Myung Jin-hwan	
2003	Merry Go Round	Eun-kyo and Jin-kyo's father	
2003	Open Drama Man & Woman "Well"	Soon-taek	
2004	MBC Best Theater "Butterfly"	Jae-wook	
2004	The Age of Heroes	Chun Sa-gook	
2004	Toji, the Land	Jo Joon-gu	
2004	Emperor of the Sea	Lee Do-hyeong	
2004	Drama City "Cruel Fairytale"	Joon-ho	
2005	Drama City "Don't Go Home Tonight"	President Jo	
2005	Resurrection	Lee Tae-joon	
2005	TV Literature "A River Flows Through Everyone's Hearts"	Kyung-jae	
2005	Hometown Station	Chae Dal-pyeong	
2005	The Youth in Barefoot	Uhm Jung-hwan	
2005	Drama City "The Blue Nights of Jeju Island"	Noh Sook-ja	
2006	Wolf	Bae Doo-il	
2006	Drama City "A Parting More Beautiful Than Love"	Seok-joon	
2006	Alone in Love	Yoo Ki-young	
2006	The Invisible Man		
2006	Yeon Gaesomun	Emperor Yang of Sui	
2007	When Spring Comes	Lee Deok-soo	
2007	By My Side	Seo Jun-seok	
2007	Ground Zero	Kim Cheon-soo	
2007	Time Between Dog and Wolf	Jung Hak-soo	
2007	Get Karl! Oh Soo-jung	Oh Byung-jik	
2007	The Innocent Woman	Seo Jun-man	
2007	Drama City "GOD"	Min Jung-shik	One act-drama
2008	The Great King, Sejong	Hwang Hui	
2008	Don't Ask Me About the Past	Kwak Sang-hyun	
2008	Night After Night	Heo Tae-soo	
2008	Tazza	Agwi	
2008	Worlds Within	Kim Min-chul	
2009	Partner	Congressman Kwon Hee-soo	episodes 7–10
2009	Soul	Baek Do-shik	
2009	Hometown Legends "The Grudge Island"	Jung Yeo-rip	
2009	Iris	nuclear physicist Yoo Jung-hoon	episodes 12–13
2010	Jejungwon	Yoo Hee-seo	
2010	The Slave Hunters	King Injo	
2010	Merchant Kim Man-deok	Kang Gye-man	
2010	Cinderella's Stepsister	Gu Dae-sung	
2010	Joseon X-Files	Ji-seung	
2010	Sungkyunkwan Scandal	Lee Jung-moo	
2010	MBC Best Theater "Housewife Kim Gwang-ja's 3rd Meeting"	Choi Byung-gu	one act-drama
2010	KBS Drama Special "After the Opera"	Han Jung-hoon	
2010	Home Sweet Home	Sung Eun-pil	Cameo
2010	All My Love for You	Director Kim	
2011	Just Like Today	Jang Choon-bok	
2012	Jeon Woo-chi	Ma Sook	
2013	Iris II: New Generation	Mr. Black	
2013	You Are the Best!	Shin Dong-hyuk	
2013	The Secret of Birth	Choi Gook	
2014	Inspiring Generation	Toyama Denkai	
2014	Marriage, Not Dating	Gong Soo-hwan	
2014	Blade Man	Joo Jang-won	
2015	More Than a Maid	Kim Chi-kwon	
2015	Blood	Yoo Seok-joo	
2015	Divorce Lawyer in Love	Bong In-jae	
2015	Splash Splash Love	Prime Minister Hwang Hui	
2015	All About My Mom	Lee Dong-chul	
2016	Secret Healer	Heo Jun after 40 years	Cameo
2016	The K2	Park Gwan-soo	
2016	My Lawyer, Mr. Jo	Shin Young-il	
2017	Whisper	Choi Il-hwan	
2017	Man in the Kitchen	Lee Shin-mo	
2018	Mr. Sunshine	Hwang Eun-san	
2018	Just Dance	Lee Kyu-ho	
2019	Haechi	King Sookjong	
2019	Chief of Staff	Song Hee-seop	Season 1–2
2019	Designated Survivor: 60 Days	President Yang Jin-man	
2020–2021	Hospital Playlist	Joo Jong-soo	Season 1–2
2020	Delayed Justice	Kim Hyung-chun	
2021	Jirisan	Kang Hyun-jo's father	Cameo (episode 15–16)
2022	Today's Webtoon	Baek Ho-jin	
2024	Queen of Tears	Hong Man-dae	
2025	Pro Bono	Oh Gyu-jang	

=== Web series ===
Year	Title	Role	Notes	Ref.
2020	Sweet Home	Ahn Gil-seop	Season 1	
2022	I Haven't Done My Best Yet	Nam Dong-jin		

=== Television shows ===
Year	Title	Role	Ref.
2011	Miracle Audition	Judge	
2011	Top Gear Korea	MC	
2012	The Secrets of Family	MC	
2012	With You	MC	
2013	Who Wants to Be a Millionaire?	MC	
2021–2022	God father	Main Cast	

=== Documentary narration ===
Year	Title
2010	모델
2010	미국 농부 조엘의 혁명
2011	다큐프라임 - 화산
2012	무언가족

=== Music video appearances ===
Year	Song Title	Artist	Ref.
2022	"Right answer" (정답은 없다)	Jang Min-ho	

== Stage ==
=== Musical ===
Musical play performances
Year	Title		Role	Theater	Date	Ref.
Year	English	Korean	Role	Theater	Date	Ref.
1997	Jang Bogo	장보고	Jang Bogo	Old Opera Frankfurt	October 6	
1981	Evita	에비타		Sejong Cultural Center Grand Auditorium	December 24 to 27	
2017-2018	Billy Elliot	빌리 엘리어트	Father	Dcube Link Art Center	November 28, 2017 - May 7, 2018	

=== Theater ===
Theater play performances
Year	Title		Role	Theater	Date	Ref.
Year	English	Korean	Role	Theater	Date	Ref.
1993	Jump the Barrel	통 뛰어넘기	Playwright	Arts Center Grand Theater	May 26 to July 8	
1994	Your Silence	님의 침묵		Sinshi Theater		
1996	The 20th Seoul Theatre Festival: Your Silence	(제20회) 서울연극제; 님의 침묵		Seoul Arts Centre Towol Theatre	September 13 to 26	
1997	Maleus Maleficarum - Witch Hunt	말레우스 말레피까룸 - 마녀사냥		Changwon Neulpurun Hall	November 21 to 23	
2008	Where Are You Going, Sunwoo?	선우씨, 어디가세요	-	Arutto Small Theater (Sodamso Small Theater)	May 9, 2008 - July 27, 2008	
2008	We Blew the Nah-Bal	우린 나발을 불었다	Producer	Arutto Small Theater (Sodamso Small Theater)	November 7, 2008 - November 29, 2008	
2008-2009	Beautiful Relationship	아름다운 인연	Producer	Arutto Small Theater (Sodamso Small Theater)	September 26, 2008 - June 28, 2009	
2009	Kalman	칼맨	-	Arutto Small Theater (Sodamso Small Theater)	October 16, 2009 - December 31, 2009	
2010-2011	Seoul Terror	서울테러	Producer	Arutto Small Theater (Sodamso Small Theater)	December 10, 2010 - April 30, 2011	
2011	Beautiful Relationship	아름다운 인연	Hong Janggun	ARKO Arts Theater Small Theater	February 16, 2011 - February 28, 2011	
2011-2012	Seoul Terror	서울테러	Director	Arutto Small Theater (Sodamso Small Theater)	November 2, 2011 - April 15, 2012	
2012	Marronnier Summer Festival	2012 마로니에여름축제	-	Daehakro Art Theater Small Theater	August 3, 2012 - August 11, 2012	
2014	The Understudy	-	Director	Deep Arena	June 13, 2014 - September 27, 2014	

== Awards and nominations ==
Year	Award	Category	Nominated work	Result	Ref.
1984	Oh Young-jin Theater Award	Best Actor	The Silence of the Master	Won	
1988	13th Young-hee Theater Award	Best Actor		Won	
1988	24th Baeksang Arts Awards	Best Actor (Theater)	Ireland	Nominated	
1989	KBS Drama Awards	Best New Actor	And So Flows History	Nominated	
1990	26th Baeksang Arts Awards	Best New Actor (TV)	And So Flows History	Won	
1991	15th Seoul Theater Festival	Best Actor		Won	
1991	28th Dong-A Theater Awards	Best Actor		Won	
1994	18th Seoul Theater Festival	Best Actor		Won	
1994	5th Chunsa Film Art Awards	Best New Actor	The Taebaek Mountains	Won	
1994	15th Blue Dragon Film Awards	Best New Actor	The Taebaek Mountains	Nominated	
1994	15th Blue Dragon Film Awards	Best Supporting Actor	The Taebaek Mountains	Won	
1995	31st Baeksang Arts Awards	Best Actor (Film)	The Taebaek Mountains	Won	
1995	33rd Grand Bell Awards	Best Actor	The Taebaek Mountains	Won	
1996	KBS Drama Awards	Excellence Award, Actor	Dazzling Dawn	Nominated	
2000	36th Baeksang Arts Awards	Best Actor (TV)	Sad Temptation	Nominated	
2001	KBS Drama Awards	Best Supporting Actor	Emperor Wang Gun	Nominated	
2001	KBS Drama Awards	Excellence Award, Actor	Emperor Wang Gun	Won	
2003	Japan Film Critics Association	Asia Goodwill Award	—N/a	Won	
2003	4th Busan Film Critics Awards	Best Supporting Actor	Mutt Boy	Won	
2003	24th Blue Dragon Film Awards	Best Supporting Actor	Mutt Boy	Nominated	
2004	KBS Drama Awards	Top Excellence Award, Actor	Age of Warriors	Nominated	
2005	KBS Drama Awards	Top Excellence Award, Actor	Emperor of the Sea; Resurrection; Hometown Station	Nominated	
2005	SBS Drama Awards	Best Supporting Actor	The Land	Won	
2006	SBS Drama Awards	Top 10 Stars	Yeon Gaesomun	Won	
2006	SBS Drama Awards	Top Excellence Award, Actor	Yeon Gaesomun	Won	
2007	KBS Drama Awards	Excellence Award, Actor in a Daily Drama	The Innocent Woman	Nominated	
2008	SBS Drama Awards	Best Supporting Actor in a Special Planning Drama	Tazza	Nominated	
2010	4th Mnet 20's Choice Awards	Most Influential Star	—N/a	Won	
2010	KBS Drama Awards	Top Excellence Award, Actor	Sungkyunkwan Scandal; Cinderella's Sister; The Slave Hunters	Won	
2011	MBC Entertainment Awards	Top Excellence Award, Actor in a Comedy/Sitcom	All My Love	Won	
2011	MBC Drama Awards	Top Excellence Award, Actor in a Serial Drama	Just Like Today	Nominated	
2013	4th Korea Popular Culture & Art Awards	Prime Minister's Commendation	—N/a	Won	
2015	KBS Drama Awards	Excellence Award, Actor in a Serial Drama	All About My Mom	Won	
2016	KBS Drama Awards	Best Supporting Actor	My Lawyer, Mr. Jo	Nominated	
2017	MBC Drama Awards	Top Excellence Award, Actor in a Weekend Drama	Man in the Kitchen	Nominated	
2017	SBS Drama Awards	Character of the Year	Whisper	Nominated	
2021	19th KBS Entertainment Awards	Rookie Award in Reality Category	Godfather	Nominated	
