= Gim Man-deok =

South Korean businesswoman

- Hangul: 김만덕
- Hanja: 金萬德
- RR: Gim Mandeok
- MR: Kim Mandŏk

Kim Man-deok (1739–1812), also known as "Man-deok halmang" (Grandmother Man-deok), was a Korean merchant and businesswoman of Joseon. When a major famine hit Jeju Island, all of the rice she had bought on land was freed and donated to save the starving people of the island. After her death, contemporaries wrote her biography and poems in her honor.

She is regarded as Korea's first CEO and an example of philanthropism and pragmatism. She managed to achieve her position in Jeju thanks to the island's egalitarian and matrifocal culture, where women had greater economic and social independence than the rest of the country, whose Neo-Confucian ideology enforced strong female repression.

== Historical background ==
A lot of social discrimination existed in 1739, during King Yeongjo's reign of Joseon, when Kim Man-deok was born. Women could not achieve high social status and also were limited in education. In 18th century Joseon, the advent of rice planting led to a commercial boom, which Kim was able to exploit.

== Biography ==
Kim Man-deok was born in a poor household. Her father, Kim Eun-gyeol, was a yangban in political exile, who was from the Gimhae Kim clan, and her mother was a yangmin from the Jeju Go clan. With two older brothers, she was the only daughter. Through her father, Kim was the 15th generation descendant of the Jwajeongseung branch (좌정승공파) of the Gimhae Kim clan; the branch being founded by Kim Man-hui. Jeju Ipdojo Kim Man-hui (김만희, 金萬希; 1314–1404) did not cooperate with the founding of Joseon, so he was exiled to Jeju and called himself a "Goryeo refugee" and settled here in Gwakji-ri, Jeju, called Jeju Samjeolsin. His 6th generation grandson, Kim Hu-chan (김후찬; 金厚瓚), who served as an eclectic general, is also the ancestor of Kim Man-deok.

By law, under unions between people of two different social classes, the children belonged to the lower social class. Thus, Kim and her brothers belonged to the yangmin class like their mother.

When Gim was 11 years old, her father died in a storm on his way back from Naju and her mother died the following year due to grief, leading to her becoming a gisaeng to Wol Jung-seon, who made Kim her adoptive daughter. She learned how to sing and dance, and lived as a gisaeng for a while; Gim was also educated in the arts, medicine, crafts and horse riding, and, given the traditional location of the gisaengs' houses in the town center near the market, she also learned how to trade.

Since 1650, gisaengs were considered state property and had to pay a large sum of money to the government to earn their freedom. At the age of 22, Kim managed to get her name removed from the gisaeng registry and regain her yangmin status and subsequently opened an inn for merchants (객주) as well as start a commission agency for port trade, acting as an intermediate between merchants from the mainland and from Jeju; she sold local specialties such as horsehair, seaweed, ear shell, ox bezoar, pearls, cloth, accessories and cosmetics, and also bought grain from land and sold them to Jeju people. Thanks to her knowledge, and by exploiting the tax laws, Kim obtained the monopoly of rice and salt, accumulating great wealth and becoming, at the age of 50, one of the two richest people in Joseon.

In 1792, Jeju was hit by a famine due to repeated crop failures and floods. Then in 1794, strong winds and high tides worsened the situation in Jeju. The governor of Jeju petitioned the court to send 20,000 bags of rice, but seven of the twelve boats sent were wrecked on the way and 170,000 people died of starvation. Kim then used most of her fortune to import and distribute food, mainly rice, saving 18,000 lives. Word of Kim's donation soon spread, resulting in King Jeongjo complimenting her and stating that he would grant her a wish. Gim's wish was to see both the palace in the capital city of Hanyang and Mt. Geumgang, which was an unusual request, considering that for 200 years women of Jeju had been forbidden to leave the island. The king agreed and also granted her the honorary title and the position of nurse of the palace dispensary (의녀반수; 醫女班首).

== Death and legacy ==
After her visit to the mainland, in 1797 Kim returned to Jeju, where she died in 1812, at the age of 73. She left all her belongings to the poor, save for a small sum for an orphan she had adopted.

Following her death, contemporaries Pak Chega and Chŏng Yagyong wrote poems in her honor, while the Chief State Councilor Ch'ae Chegong wrote the biography Man-deok jeon (Man-deok's story) which praises her virtue and her charitable work.

In modern times, there are scholarships in her name, a foundation dedicated to providing food to the needy and a museum built in Jeju in 1978. Each year the island also awards the Kim Man-deok Award to two women of exemplary conduct.

== Family ==
- Father - Kim Eung-ryeol (김응렬; 金應悅; 1705–1758)
- Mother - Lady Go of the Jeju Go clan (제주 고씨; 濟州 髙氏; 1705–?)
- Siblings
  - Older brother - Kim Man-seok (김만석; 金萬碩; 1735–1748)
  - Older brother - Kim Man-jae (김만재; 金萬才; 1737–?)
- Issue
  - Adoptive son - Kim Jong-ju (김종주; 金鍾周)

== In popular culture ==
The Great Merchant is a 2010 South Korean historical drama that follows the life of Gim Man-deok, along with her ongoing rivalry with fellow merchants during the Joseon Dynasty. Starring Lee Mi-yeon in the titular role, the series aired on KBS1 from March 6 to June 13, 2010 for 30 episodes.

Man-deok is a musical first performed in Jeju Art Center from January 26 to January 28, 2018. The musical was prepared by Jeju City, which had wanted to build up a representative culture brand, and depicts Gim Man-deok's life and her achievements.

Kim Mandeok is briefly mentioned in the novel The Island of Sea Women by Lisa See.
