= Grudge: The Revolt of Gumiho =

2010 South Korean television series

- Promotional poster
- Genre: Period drama Horror; Thriller
- Written by: Oh Sun-hyung; Jung Do-yoon
- Directed by: Lee Gun-joon; Lee Jae-sang
- Starring: Han Eun-jung; Jang Hyun-sung; Kim Yoo-jung; Seo Shin-ae
- Country of origin: South Korea
- Original language: Korean
- No. of episodes: 16

Production
- Producers: Lee Jae-young; Kim Shin-il
- Production location: Korea
- Running time: Mondays and Tuesdays at 21:55 (KST)
- Production companies: KBS Media; Broadstorm

Original release
- Network: Korean Broadcasting System
- Release: 5 July – 24 August 2010

Grudge: The Revolt of Gumiho (Korean: 구미호: 여우누이뎐; RR: Gumiho: yeounuidyeon; lit. Gumiho: Tale of the Fox's Child) is a 2010 South Korean television series starring Han Eun-jung, Jang Hyun-sung, Kim Yoo-jung and Seo Shin-ae. It aired on KBS2 from July 5 to August 24, 2010 on Mondays and Tuesdays at 21:55 for 16 episodes.

== Plot ==
Set during the Joseon period, a beautiful gumiho (nine-tailed fox in Korean folklore) named Gu San-daek leaves her husband after he breaks his promise— "be trustworthy; do not speak of the gumiho who tried to kill you to anyone"—, and his betrayal renders her unable to shapeshift(after the tenth year of their marriage. if he had kept his promise, she would have been free of the "curse"). San-daek has a daughter, Yeon-yi. Born of a human father and a fox mother, the innocent young girl has yet to gain the ability to use her gumiho powers. The two cursed souls wander searching for a safe place to stay, and arrive at a village where they meet Yoon Doo-soo, a seemingly kind and gentle former official. But Doo-soo's daughter Cho-ok suffers from a mystical disease, and the only way to save her is to feed her the liver of a girl of the same age. When he realizes that San-daek and her daughter have no place to go, and that Yeon-yi is the same age as his daughter, he takes them in and awaits the perfect time to strike. But Doo-soo begins to fall for San-daek, and Cho-ok starts to envy her father's interest in the mysterious mother and daughter. Meanwhile, as Yeon-yi turns ten years old, her physical transformation begins, and thus the tale of love, betrayal, friendship and jealousy begins.

== Cast ==
- Han Eun-jung as Gu San-daek/Gumiho
- Jang Hyun-sung as Yoon Doo-soo
- Kim Yoo-jung as Yeon-yi
- Seo Shin-ae as Yoon Cho-ok
- Kim Jung-nan as Lady Yang
- Kim Kyu-chul as steward Oh
- Seo Jun-young as Chun-woo
- Im Seo-yeon as Kye-hyang
- Kim Woo-seok as Yoon Choong-il
- Woo Min-gyu as Yoon Choong-yi
- Chun Ho-jin as Manshin, a shaman
- Park Soo-hyun as exorcist
- Yoon Hee-seok as village leader Jo
- Lee Tae-ri (Note: Credited as Lee Min-ho.) as Jo Jung-kyu
- Go Jung-min as Village leader Jo's wife
- Baek Bong-ki as Ba-wi
- Jung Eun-pyo as Gumiho's husband
- Kim Do-yeon as Un-nyun
- Han So-jung as Sam-wol
- Han Si-yoon as Yoo-wol
- Kim Hyuk as Man-seok
- Jang Hang-sun as monk
- Lee Dae-ro as royal physician
- Choi Hye-kyung as So-yeon
- Shin Dong-mi as So-yeon's mother

== Ratings ==
In this table, the blue numbers represent the lowest ratings and the red numbers represent the highest ratings.

| Episode # | Original broadcast date | Average audience share | | |
| Episode # | Original broadcast date | TNmS Ratings | | AGB Nielsen |
| Episode # | Original broadcast date | Nationwide | Seoul National Capital Area | Nationwide |
|---|---|---|---|---|
| 1 | 5 July 2010 | 8.7% | 8.7% | 7.3% |
| 2 | 6 July 2010 | 8.8% | 8.5% | 7.4% |
| 3 | 12 July 2010 | 10.8% | 10.7% | 8.4% |
| 4 | 13 July 2010 | 10.3% | 10.4% | 8.5% |
| 5 | 19 July 2010 | 12.4% | 11.7% | 9.5% |
| 6 | 20 July 2010 | 12.6% | 12.2% | 9.5% |
| 7 | 26 July 2010 | 11.5% | 11.4% | 9.8% |
| 8 | 27 July 2010 | 11.7% | 11.5% | 10.0% |
| 9 | 2 August 2010 | 12.1% | 11.6% | 10.2% |
| 10 | 3 August 2010 | 14.7% | 14.1% | 12.0% |
| 11 | 9 August 2010 | 14.6% | 14.0% | 13.1% |
| 12 | 10 August 2010 | 15.3% | 15.0% | 12.7% |
| 13 | 16 August 2010 | 14.3% | 14.0% | 11.8% |
| 14 | 17 August 2010 | 16.9% | 16.8% | 12.8% |
| 15 | 23 August 2010 | 13.9% | 13.8% | 11.3% |
| 16 | 24 August 2010 | 16.1% | 16.1% | 12.9% |
| Average | | 12.8% | 12.5% | 10.45% |

== Awards ==
2010 KBS Drama Awards

- Excellence Award, Actress in a Miniseries: Han Eun-jung
- Best Young Actress: Kim Yoo-jung and Seo Shin-ae

== International broadcast ==
| Country | Network(s)/Station(s) | Release | Title |
|---|---|---|---|
| Thailand | Workpoint TV | December 13, 2013 to January 3, 2014 | ตำนานรักนางจิ้งจอก (Tảnān Rạk Nāng Cîngcxk; literally: Love's Story of Gumiho) |
