= Seo Shin-ae =

South Korean actress (born 1998)

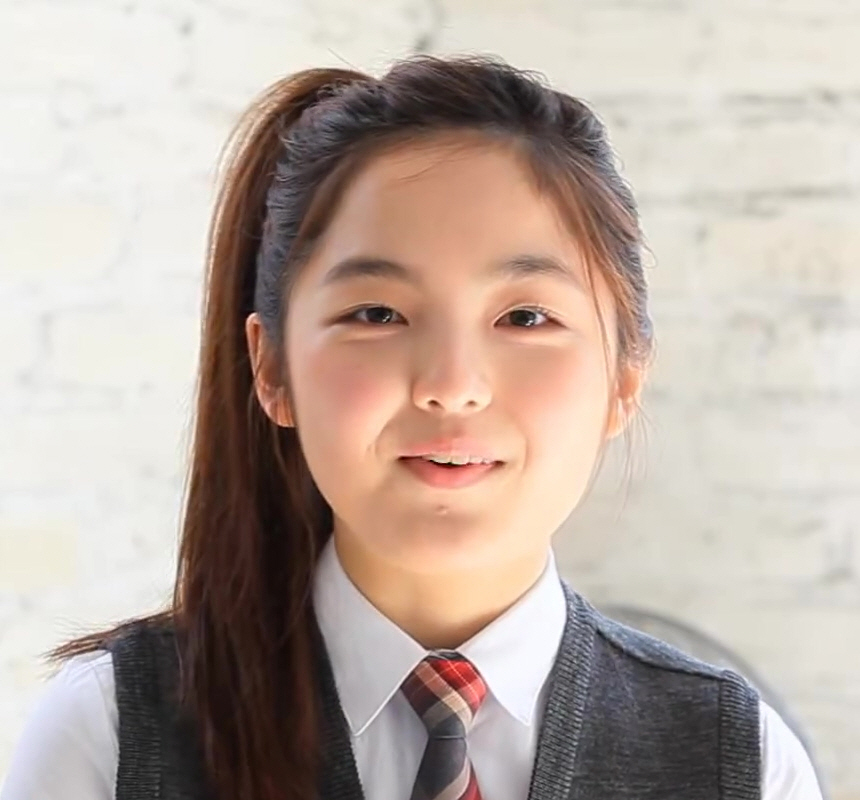
- Seo in 2015
- Born: October 20, 1998 (age 28); Baeyang-ri, Taean-eup, Hwaseong, Gyeonggi Province, South Korea
- Education: Sungkyunkwan University
- Occupation: Actress
- Years active: 2004–present

Korean name
- Hangul: 서신애
- Hanja: 徐信愛
- RR: Seo Sinae
- MR: Sŏ Sinae

Seo Shin-ae (Korean: 서신애; born October 20, 1998) is a South Korean actress. She made her entertainment debut in 2004 in a commercial for Seoul Milk. Seo then became known as a child actress, notably in the film Meet Mr. Daddy (2007), and the television dramas Thank You (2007), Grudge: The Revolt of Gumiho (2010), and The Queen's Classroom (2013).

== Filmography ==
=== Television series ===
Year	Title	Role
2007	Thank You	Lee Bom
2009	Glory of Youth	Lee Soon-ja
2009	High Kick Through the Roof	Shin Shin-ae
2010	Grudge: The Revolt of Gumiho	Yoon Cho-ok
2010	KBS Drama Special: "Boy Meets Girl"	Lee Ji-wan
2012	KBS Drama Special: "SOS – Save Our School"	Bang Shi-yeon
2013	Incarnation of Money	young Bok Jae-in
2013	The Queen's Classroom	Eun Bo-mi
2014	Naughty Ceratops Koriyo	Tree (voice)
2014	Potato Star 2013QR3	Seo Shin-ae (cameo, episode 79)
2014	Climb the Sky Walls	(cameo)
2016	W	Kang Soo-yeon (cameo)
2016	Solomon's Perjury	Park Cho-rong

=== Web series ===
Year	Title	Role
2016	Nightmare Teacher	Kim Seul Ki
2017	Aim High	Kim So Yeon

=== Film ===
Year	Title	Role
2005	Mr. Housewife	Da-na
2007	Meet Mr. Daddy	Woo Joon
2007	My Love	Hye-young
2012	Yona Yona Penguin	Coco (voice, Korean dubbed)
2014	My Love, My Bride	Jae-kyung
2015	Wonderful Nightmare	Ha-neul
2016	Bittersweet Brew	Yeon-seo
2017	Mothers	Joo-mi

=== Variety show ===
Year	Title	Notes
2007	!Exclamation Mark: Over the Mountain! Across the River!	Host
2009	Human Documentary Love: Fourth Mom	Documentary narration
2010	Fox's Butler	Cast member
2013	Top Designer 2013	Special jury, episode 5
2013	KOICA's Dream	Cast member, episodes 3–4
2013	Human Documentary Good People: We Learn	Cast member, episode 34
2016, 2017	King of Mask Singer	Contestant as "Masked Assassin", episode 61

=== Music video appearances ===
Year	Song title	Artist
2008	"Is There Love?"	Kim Yong-jin
2013	"Green Rain"	SHINee
2014	"The Story of Our Lives"	g.o.d

== Theater ==
Year	Title	Role
2011	Aladdin	Lana, Aladdin's younger sister
2011	A Villain Actor, Nam Dal-gu	Nam Ji-won
2017–2018	All Shook Up	Lorraine

== Discography ==
=== Soundtrack appearance ===
Year	Title	Notes
2007	"Do You Know"	Duet with Lee Ji-hoon; track from Meet Mr. Daddy OST

== Awards and nominations ==
Year	Award	Category	Nominated work	Result
2007	MBC Drama Awards	Best Young Actress	Thank You	Won
2009	MBC Entertainment Awards	Best Young Actress	High Kick Through the Roof	Won
2009	KBS Drama Awards	Best Young Actress	Glory of Youth	Nominated
2010	KBS Drama Awards	Best Young Actress	Grudge: The Revolt of Gumiho	Won
2012	KBS Drama Awards	Best Young Actress	SOS – Save Our School	Nominated
2013	MBC Drama Awards	Best Young Actress	The Queen's Classroom	Won
