= Once Upon a Time in High School =

- Theatrical release poster
- Hangul: 말죽거리 잔혹사
- RR: Maljukgeori janhoksa
- MR: Maljukkŏri chanhoksa
- Directed by: Yoo Ha
- Written by: Yoo Ha
- Produced by: Cha Seung-jae; No Jong-yoon
- Starring: Kwon Sang-woo; Lee Jung-jin; Han Ga-in
- Cinematography: Choi Hyeon-gi
- Edited by: Park Gok-ji
- Music by: Kim Joon-seok
- Production company: Sidus FNH
- Distributed by: CJ Entertainment
- Release date: January 16, 2004
- Running time: 116 minutes
- Country: South Korea
- Language: Korean

Once Upon a Time in High School: The Spirit of Jeet Kune Do (Korean: 말죽거리 잔혹사; lit. 'Cruel History of Maljuk Street') is a 2004 South Korean action drama film. The background of the film is set in a high school in South Korea, 1978. One of the filming locations was the present neighborhood of Yangjae-dong, Seocho District, Seoul.

== Synopsis ==
Hyun-soo (Kwon Sang-woo), transfers to a school that is notorious for its poor outcomes and brutality. He joins a bottom-rank class and experiences violence by delinquents led by Jong-hoon (Lee Jong-hyuk), a stereotypical Korean bully. The teachers are depicted as authoritarian and brutal. On the bus, Hyun-soo sees and falls in love with Eun-joo (Han Ga-in). When schoolboys start teasing her, Hyun-soo takes the opportunity to gain her respect, even though it starts a riot. After the two are chased and caught in their hiding place, one of Hyun-soo's friends Kim Woo-sik (Lee Jung-jin), steps in and knocks out the attackers.

A love triangle is formed between Hyun-soo, Woo-sik, and Eun-joo. One day, Hyun-soo notices Woo-sik and Eun-joo arguing. Despite his only achievement being sharing an umbrella with her, he meets her on a rooftop that night and they bond with each other while Woo-sik jealously observes them in secret. One day Hyun-soo and Woo-sik get in a fight over Eun-joo and their friendship ends. Woo-sik then humiliates and beats up Ham Jye-bok or "Hamburger" (Park Hyo-jun) who sells pornography to other students. Woo-sik then loses an intense fight with Jong-hoon on the rooftop and leaves the school, presumably having dropped out.

Hyun-soo concludes that Eun-joo has left him for Woo-sik. Hyun-soo's father is a black belt in Tae Kwon Do and an owner of a Tae Kwon Do gym; he treats his students kindly while treating his son poorly. When he discovers that Hyun-soo has been receiving poor grades, he beats him, refers to him as "surplus man" (a derogatory term for a person without a future), and kicks him out of his house permanently.

No longer able to put up with the conduct of Jong-hoon, his gang, nor the brutality and violence of teachers, Hyun-soo trains himself in Jeet Kune Do, inspired by his childhood hero Bruce Lee. One day, on the same rooftop where Woo-sik lost his fight with Jong-hoon, Hyun-soo uses nunchaku and his new-found expertise in Jeet Kune Do to grievously injure Jong-hoon and his gang mates. When authorities blame Hyun-soo, he lashes out. Smashing windows and throwing his nunchucks, he curses Korea's entire education system for being so corrupt and encouraging brutality.

Hyun-soo is expelled and sent to a public school. Jong-hoon's mother blames him for beating her son, forcing his father to apologize to her for his son's actions. Hyun-soo apologizes to his father about the incident and they eventually reconcile. His father tells him that he can always get a GED and asks if Bruce Lee went to college, knowing full well that he didn't and realizing that a good man isn't defined by a college education. By chance, he runs into Eun-joo. Hyun-soo later attends a movie with Ham Jye-bok and both goof off with mock martial arts over Bruce Lee vs Jackie Chan.

== Cast ==
- Kwon Sang-woo as Hyun-soo
  - Kim Dong-young as young Hyun-soo
- Lee Jung-jin as Woo-sik
- Han Ga-in as Eun-joo
- Kim In-kwon as Jik-sae
- Lee Jong-hyuk as Jong-hoon
- Park Hyo-jun as Hamburger
- Seo Dong-won as Seong-hun
- Baek Bong-ki as Cheetah
- Kim Byeong-chun as drill teacher
- Yang Han-seok as P.E. teacher
- Ahn Nae-sang as Math teacher
- Lee Jin-wook as Jiksae's friend
- Park Jin-tae
- Kim Bu-seon as tteokbokki store owner
- Chun Ho-jin as Hyun-soo's father
- Kim Young-im
- Choi Jae-hwan
- Kim Su-nam
- Lee Yu-soo
- Kwon Tae-won as English teacher
- Jung Jae-jin
- Lee Sook
- Cho Jin-woong as gang member
- Lee Hyeon-seok as Hyun-soo's mother
- Jeon Sung-ae as Jong-hoon's mother
- Park Soo-young as Politics & Economics teacher
- Choi Woong as dance club guard
- Jeon Jin-woo as the DJ in the tteokbokki store

== Awards and nominations ==
2004 Baeksang Arts Awards

- Most Popular Actor - Kwon Sang-woo
- Nomination - Best Actor - Kwon Sang-woo

2004 Grand Bell Awards

- Popularity Award - Kwon Sang-woo
- Nomination - Best Original Screenplay - Yoo Ha

2004 Blue Dragon Film Awards

- Best Art Direction - Kim Gi-cheol, Kim Hyo-jeong
- Popular Star Award - Kwon Sang-woo
- Nomination - Best Film
- Nomination - Best Director - Yoo Ha
- Nomination - Best Screenplay - Yoo Ha
- Nomination - Best Cinematography - Choi Hyeon-gi
- Nomination - Best New Actress - Han Ga-in

2004 Korean Film Awards

- Nomination - Best Film
- Nomination - Best Director - Yoo Ha
- Nomination - Best Screenplay - Yoo Ha
- Nomination - Best New Actress - Han Ga-in
