= Yi Jeong-gyu =

Korean anarchist (1897–1984)

- 이정규
- Born: 1897
- Died: 1984 (aged 86–87)
- Occupation: anarchist
- Known for: involvement in the Korean independence movement

Yi Jeong-gyu (Korean: 이정규; Hanja: 李丁奎; 1897 – 1984) known by his pen name Woogwan (우관; 又觀) was a Korean anarchist. He spent much of his youth in China, where anarchists were relatively freer than in occupied Korea, and collaborated with not only Chinese anarchists but also with ones from various countries such as Japan, Taiwan, and Russia. He was one of the pioneers of the Korean anarchist movement in the early 1920s, and one of the most prominent Korean anarchists in China of that period.

He started his career as an activist for Korean independence and shortly after he became a supporter of anarchism. Yi Jeong-gyu did not recognize anarchism and nationalism as opposing ideologies and pursued his twin goals of reclaiming Korea's independence and establishing a new Korea based on anarchist ideals. Together with Lee Hoe-yeong (이회영; 李會榮), he is regarded as one of the key figures who established the anarchist ideology of the Korean independence movement.

== Family ==
Yi Jeong-gyu was the younger brother of Yi Eulgyu (이을규; 李乙奎), who was known as “Korea’s Kropotkin”, and was one of the key figures in the Daedongdan. Yi Eulgyu led the exile case of King Yi Kang.

== Life ==
His family lived in Nonsan, Chungcheongnam-do, and Yi Jeong-gyu was born in Jangbong-do, Incheon of South Korea. He attended Incheon High School (formerly Incheon Public Commercial School) in 1911 under Japanese rule. After graduating, he got a job at a bank but resigned in protest against racial discrimination from the Japanese. Around that time he became involved with the independence movement.

In 1918, Yi developed an interest in socialism during his time in Japan's Keiō University. Yi participated in the February 8 Declaration of Independence in 1919 as a member of the Korean International Student Association (조선유학생학우회; 朝鮮留學生學友會). He traveled back to Korea with the start of the 1919 March 1st Movement. Yi came to represent his home Chungcheong Province in Korea's Provisional Government, assembled in Shanghai in April 1919.

Drawn westward to join the Russian Revolution, he intended to attend the Far East University in late 1921, but fearing violence between Korean Communists, he remained in Beijing. The next two years in Beijing were formative for Yi, as was his pride in the fight for Korean independence, both of which helped to develop his personality and anarchist ideas. He continued his economics studies at Beijing University with the help of Chinese anarchists Li Shizeng and Cai Yuanpei. In Beijing, he also met Yu Ja-myeong, the Russian poet Vasili Eroshenko, and other radicals: Lu Xun, Zhou Zuoren, and Fan Benliang.

In April 1924, he organized the Federation of Korean Anarchists (조선무정부주의자연맹; 재중국조선무정부주의자연맹; 在中國朝鮮無政府主義者聯盟) with Lee Hoi-young, Sin Chaeho, Yi Eulgyu, Jeong Hyeon-seop, Yu Jamyeong, and Baek Jeong-gi.

After establishing anarchist organizations, the Korean anarchists sought to build a new Korean society with independence based on anarchist principles. To this end, he collaborated with Chinese anarchists and Esperantists. In mid-1923, Yi co-established a Beijing school for Esperantists and taught in its middle school.

Later in 1923, Yi joined in an anarchist project to build a farming commune in China's Hunan Province. They intended to relocate fifty Korean peasant families to join with existing Chinese peasant families in the region to grow profitable ginseng. The project was a cooperative organization of co-cultivation, co-consumption, and co-ownership. The project failed due to unrest in Hunan but is recognized as the first Korean anarchist farming commune experiment. Yi would attempt many times in his life to recreate such a project. Because the creation of an anarchist society in Korea would require the end of Japanese imperial rule there, the commune experiment can additionally be seen as a part of the national liberation movement. However, both aims were somewhat undercut by the project's reliance on Chinese assistance.

Yi was in Shanghai by late 1924 and apprenticed at a British-owned foundry before being fired for his involvement with labor organizing activities. He participated in the Shanghai National Labor University, which trained urban labor leaders.

In Nanjing around July 1928 Yi Jeong-gyu was elected to serve as one of the secretaries of the Eastern Anarchist Federation (EAF, Dongfang wuzhengfu zhuyizhe lianmeng; 동방무정부주의자연맹; 東方無政府主義者聯盟), which was established by anarchists from various East Asian countries, Korea, China, the Philippines, Japan, Taiwan, and Vietnam (Annam; 安南) to strengthen international ties and build an ideal society that secures the independence of each nation and individual freedom. In the first issue of its journal The East (동방(Dongbang); Japanese:Tōhō; Chinese:Dongfang) published simultaneously in those three East Asian languages on August 20, 1928, he contributed a now-lost article titled “To Inform Eastern Asian Anarchists”. In this piece, Yi Jeonggy called for the revolution in Korea, aided by the cooperation of “Eastern Anarchists”.

Japanese police arrested Yi in China in October 1928 and deported him to Korea for trial.

Yi Jeong-gyu co-organized the Free Society Builders Federation (FSBF, 자유사회건설자연맹) in Seoul in September 1945. After 1946, he taught at Sungkyunkwan University. He served as President of Cheongju University in 1958 and President of Sungkyunkwan University in 1963 and retired in 1966. He invested all his fortune to establish the National Culture Research Center (국민문화연구소), an anarchism research group in 1970. He died in 1984 and did not apply for the status of Korean independence fighter (대한민국 독립유공자; 大韓民國 獨立有功者) during his lifetime.
