= Yi Hoeyŏng =

Korean independence activist (1867–1932)

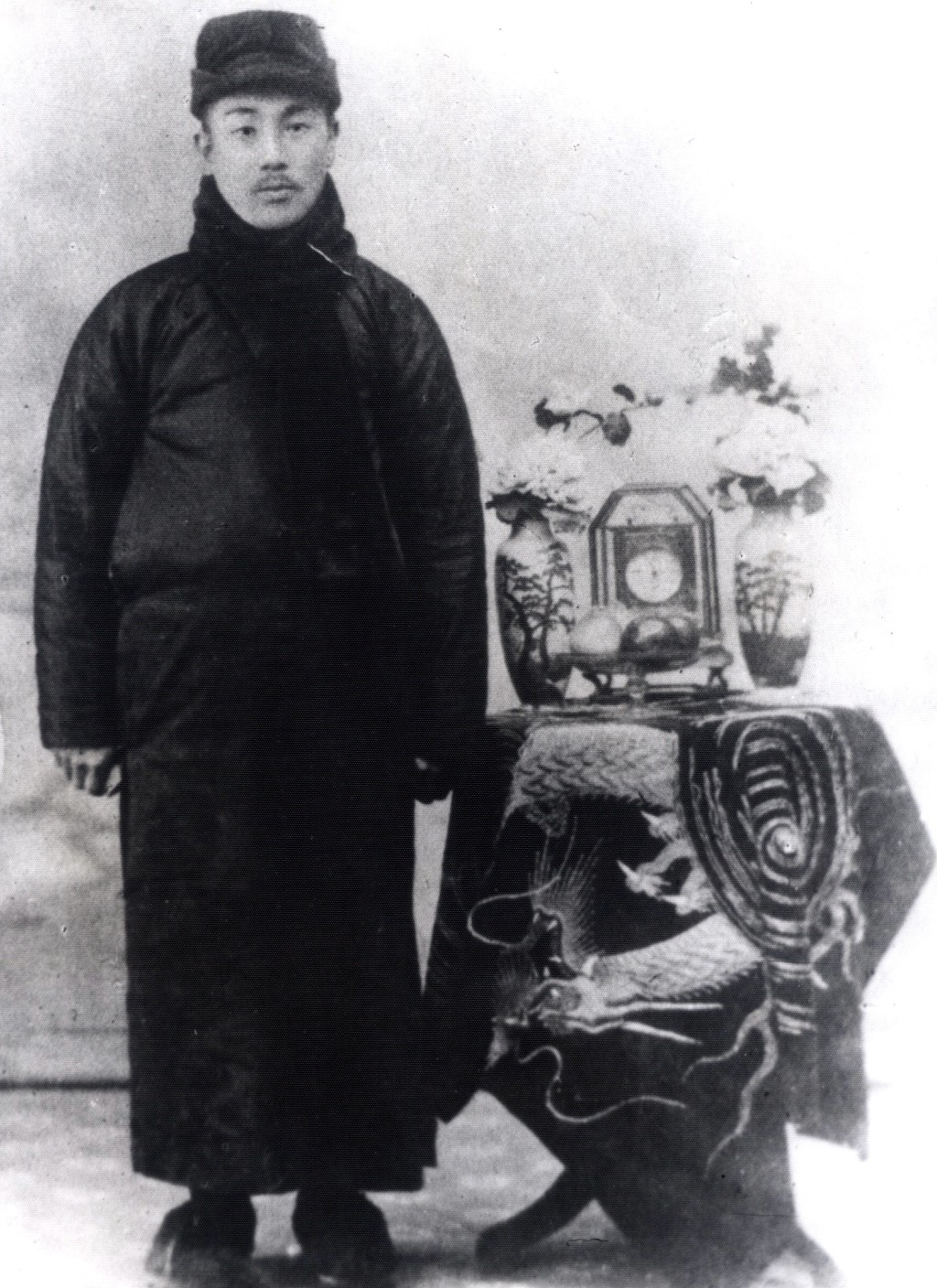
- Yi in the 1920s
- Born: 17 March 1867; Hanseong, Joseon (now Seoul, South Korea)
- Died: 17 November 1932 (aged 65); Ryojun (present-day Lüshun), Dalian, China
- Relatives: Yi Si-yeong (brother)

Korean name
- Hangul: 이회영
- Hanja: 李會榮
- RR: I Hoeyeong
- MR: I Hoeyŏng

Art name
- Hangul: 우당
- Hanja: 友堂
- RR: Udang
- MR: Udang

Yi Hoeyŏng (Korean: 이회영; Hanja: 李會榮; March 17, 1867 – November 17, 1932), also known by his art name Udang, was a Korean independence activist, anarchist and one of the founders of the Sinhŭng Military Academy in Manchuria.

== Biography ==
Yi Hoeyŏng was born in 1867. After Korea was annexed by the Empire of Japan in 1910, Yi and his five brothers fled into exile in China. Yi and his family initially found refuge in Manchuria, where he established the Society for Cultivation and Study and the Sinhŭng Military Academy for training activists of the nascent Korean independence movement. He then settled in Beijing, where he began organising with other Korean independence activists. Together with fellow exiles Shin Chae-ho and Yu Ja-myeong, Yi established the newspaper Heavenly Dream in 1921. At this time, Yi began looking for a new political philosophy which could guide the independence movement, and developed his ideas through conversations with Yu and Yi Jeong-gyu. It was Yi Jeong-gyu, who was attempting to establish a utopian farming village in Hunan, who influenced Yi Hoeyŏng towards the political philosophy of anarchism. By late 1923, he had adopted the philosophy; he later said that he did not "convert" to anarchism or become an anarchist, so much as he found that the philosophy coincided with his existing ideas about Korean independence.

Yi soon became known as a "pioneer of Korean anarchism", notably influencing Shin to adopt anarchism as his guiding philosophy. Yi proposed that Korean anarchists collaborate with the Chinese anarchist movement, believing that mutual cooperation between the two movements was essential. In April 1924, Yi co-founded the Korean Anarchist Federation in China (KAFC) and its newspaper Jeongui gongbo, for which he served as editor-in-chief. In the paper, Yi outlined his vision for a post-independence Korea, which he believed should involve the decentralisation of power to a system of local autonomous communities. He believed that the economic system in this post-independence Korea should be self-managed by society, although he refused to proscribe any specific system, in order to remain open to alliances with other sections of the Korean independence movement.

Yi was unable to attended the founding conference of the Eastern Anarchist Federation (EAF) in 1928, but sent his congratulations after its establishment. He proposed that the EAF lend its support to the Korean independence movement, declaring the Korean anarchists to be a genuine national liberation movement, and his proposal was adopted by the conference. In 1930, Yi established the Federation of the Korean Youth in South China, which brought together Korean anarchists in Shanghai. His son, Yi Gyuchang, was among its members. In the wake of the Japanese invasion of Manchuria, Yi discussed the formation of an anti-Japanese alliance between China and Korea with the Chinese anarchists Wu Zhihui and Li Shizeng. After learning of the collapse of the Korean People's Association in Manchuria, Yi sought to return to the region, but he was arrested on the way by the Imperial Japanese police in November 1932. Yi died later that year.

== Popular culture ==
In 2010, a five-part drama series about his life, titled Freedom Fighter, Lee Hoe-young, was aired by KBS.

== Bibliography ==
- Hwang, Dongyoun (2007). "Beyond Independence: The Korean Anarchist Press in China and Japan in the 1920s and 1930s". Asian Studies Review. 31 (1): 3–23. doi:10.1080/10357820701196668.
- Hwang, Dongyoun (2016). Anarchism in Korea: Independence, Transnationalism, and the Question of National Development, 1919-1984 (PDF). Albany, New York: SUNY Press. ISBN 978-1-4384-6167-0. OCLC 1039293708.
