= Freedom Fighter, Lee Hoe-young =

South Korean television series

- Promotional poster
- Hangul: 자유인 이회영
- Hanja: 自由人 李會榮
- RR: Jayuin I Hoeyeong
- MR: Chayuin I Hoeyŏng
- Genre: Historical
- Written by: Kwak In-haeng; Jung Hyun-min; Lee Mi-ho
- Directed by: Shin Chang-suk
- Starring: Jung Dong-hwan; Ahn Jae-mo; Lee Ah-yi; Hong Il-kwon; Kwon Oh-joong
- Country of origin: South Korea
- Original language: Korean
- No. of episodes: 5

Production
- Producers: Lee Jae-young; Jeon Woo-sung
- Camera setup: Multi-camera
- Running time: Saturdays and Sundays at 21:05 (KST)

Original release
- Network: KBS1
- Release: 29 August – 12 September 2010

Freedom Fighter, Lee Hoe-young (Korean: 자유인 이회영) is a 2010 South Korean historical television series, starring Jung Dong-hwan, Ahn Jae-mo, Lee Ah-yi, Hong Il-kwon and Kwon Oh-joong. Based on the life of Korean independence fighter Lee Hoe-yeong, the drama was made to commemorate the centenary of the Japanese annexation of Korea. Its premiere coincided with the signing of the annexation treaty on August 21, 1910, and the drama aired on KBS1 from August 29 to September 12, 2010 on Saturdays and Sundays at 21:05 for 5 episodes.

This was the third and last of the "noblesse oblige" series produced by KBS in 2010, following The Reputable Family and The Great Merchant.

At the end of the drama, a short documentary about Lee Hoe-young aired, including an interview with his sons, Lee Kyu-chang and Lee Kyu-dong.

== Synopsis ==
When Japan annexed Korea, Lee Hoe-young donated all of his savings and moved to Manchuria to open a school. There, he trained soldiers and scholars who later led the army to win numerous battles during the early 20th century. Lee also joined the underground anarchist movement in Shanghai to fight against Japanese forces. Lee later died in prison after being captured and tortured by the Japanese army. The drama begins from the point of view of Japanese war correspondent Kimura Junpei, who is writing his report "Lee Hoe-young, the Terrorist." But as he delves into the life of Lee, he comes to understand and admire Lee Hoe-young as a freedom fighter who led the Korean independence movement.

== Cast ==
(Names in bold are based on the actual person; art names are listed in quotation marks for some of the characters)

- Jung Dong-hwan as **"Woodang" Lee Hoe-young** (1867–1932)
- Ahn Jae-mo as Kimura Junpei
- Lee Ah-yi as Hong Jung-hwa
- Hong Il-kwon as **"Hwaam" Jung Hyun-sub** (1896–1981)
- Kwon Oh-joong as **"Gupa" Baek Jung-ki** (1896–1934)
- Choi Ik-joon as Lee Yong-joon
- Jung Seung-woo as Yoo Ki-moon
- Kim Kang-il as Sano
- Lee Jung-hwan as Hwa Kyoon-shil
- Lee Dae-ro as **Lee Suk-yeong** (1855–1934, Lee Hoe-young's older brother)
- Kim Jong-chan as **Lee Kyu-chang** (1913–2005, Lee Hoe-young's eldest son)
- Jun Kwang-jin as **Lee Kyu-seo** (1912–1933, Lee Hoe-young's nephew, Lee Suk-yeong's son)
- Jung Jong-ryul as Hong Heung-soon
- Jo Young-jin as **"Seongjae" Lee Si-yeong** (1868–1953, Lee Hoe-young's younger brother, the future Vice President of the Republic of Korea)
- Choi Il-hwa as General Kimura Endo (Junpei's father)
- Kim Kyu-chul as Asahi Shimbun Shanghai bureau chief
- Kim Ha-kyun as Ok Kwan-bin (owner of a pharmaceutical company in Shanghai)
- Jang Joon-ho as Suzuki
- Lee Jung-gil as consulate staff
- Kim Eung-soo as Captain (later Major) Mitsuwa / Kim Pan-chul (Japanese counterintelligence corps officer)
- Kim Byung-ki as Gunnery Captain Okuma
- Go In-beom as Wang Ah-cho
- Jung Heung-chae as Wang Jung-wi
- Kim Kyung-ryong as Dam-yeob
- Lee Young-hoo as **"Baekbeom" Kim Gu** (1876–1949, 6th, 12th, 13th and last President of the Provisional Government of the Republic of Korea)
