= The Reputable Family =

2010 South Korean television series

- Promotional poster
- Hangul: 명가
- Hanja: 名家
- RR: Myeongga
- MR: Myŏngga
- Written by: Baek Young-sook; Yoon Young-soo
- Directed by: Lee Eung-bok; Jeon Woo-sung
- Starring: Cha In-pyo; Han Go-eun; Kim Sung-min; Lee Hee-do
- Country of origin: South Korea
- No. of episodes: 16

Production
- Camera setup: Multi-camera
- Running time: Saturdays and Sundays at 21:40 (KST)

Original release
- Network: KBS1
- Release: January 2 – February 21, 2010

The Reputable Family (Korean: 명가; RR: Myeongga) is a 2010 South Korean television series starring Cha In-pyo, Han Go-eun, Kim Sung-min, and Lee Hee-do. It aired on KBS1 from January 1 to February 21, 2010, on Saturdays and Sundays at 21:40 for 16 episodes.

The historical drama revolves around the Gyeongju Choi clan. After the death of the head of their family, Choi Jin-lip during the second Manchu invasion of Korea (which ended in humiliating defeat for Joseon), his grandson Guk-seon vows to reclaim the honor of his clan. The Choi family must overcome obstacles and hardships both in their hometown Gyeongju, and in Hanyang (present-day Seoul).

Many of the scenes were filmed at the Korean Folk Village in Seoul. The series failed to attract viewers, receiving an average rating of 10.9%, but it was critically acclaimed and retrospectively recognized as a well-made drama by critics.

== Synopsis ==
In 1636, at a time of war, Choi Jin-lip donates his fortune to a crowd of refugees out of generosity when they flood into his quiet village. Choi Guk-seon is unhappy with his grandfather being too generous with poor people. Before leaving for Gyeongju, Jin-lip leaves his grandson a word of great significance, saying "People are the most valuable asset in the world."

But the world that Guk-seon knew begins to change around him. Won-il's father, Kim Ja-chun buys the land Choi Jin-lip gave to his slaves for free. A group of refugees led by Gil-man takes a commission from Ja-chun. After witnessing all the changes, Guk-seon comes to realize what his grandfather tried to say. Guk-seon leaves for Hanyang to stand on his own feet. Upon Yu Hyeong-won's advice Guk-seon borrows money to start his reclamation work on wastelands in Gyeongju. He gathers villagers and introduces performance-related pay which results in a huge success. Kim Ja-chun and Won-il start to get nervous about Guk-seon's success.

== Cast ==
- Cha In-pyo as Choi Guk-seon
  - Yeo Jin-goo as young Guk-seon
- Han Go-eun as Han Dan-yi
  - Moon Ga-young as young Dan-yi
- Kim Sung-min as Kim Won-il
  - Noh Young-hak as young Won-il
- Lee Hee-do as Kim Ja-chun (Won-il's father)
- Jung Dong-hwan as Jang Gil-taek
- Kim Myung-soo as Kim Soo-man
- Kim Yeong-cheol as Choi Jin-lip
- Choi Il-hwa as Choi Dong-ryang (Guk-seon's father)
- Go Jung-min as Lady Jung
- Ahn Jung-hoon as adult Ban-dol
- Jung Han-hun as Shim Won-gyo
- Lee Han-soo as Sang-nam
- Choi Jong-won as Choi Won-young
- Ahn Hae-sook as Dong-ryang's wife
- Kim Sun-hwa as Ja-chun's wife
- Jang Soon-gook as Ok-dong
- Kim Duk-hyun as Lee Seo-bang
- Kim Hye-jung as woman from Yeongsan
- Choi Woo-suk as Sang-baek

== Historical basis ==
The Choi family of Gyeongju was first known for their admirable ancestor Choi Chi-won, a prodigious scholar from the Silla Kingdom. The family's fame increased when general Choi Jin-lip became a war hero during the second Manchu invasion of Korea in the 17th century.

But it was the time of Choi Guk-seon, the 19th generation descendant of Choi Chi-won, when the family earned nationwide respect. Succeeding his father Choi Dong-ryang, who accumulated wealth through land development, Choi Guk-seon was able to join the ranks of rich people who owned fields yielding ten thousand seok of rice, thanks to his diligent efforts and thriftiness. After that, however, Choi no longer sought to increase his fortune, and instead gained a reputation for philanthropy.

In 1671, the third year of King Hyeonjong's reign, the nation was plagued by severe crop failure. Choi installed a large cauldron in his yard and opened a storehouse. He said, "What's the use of making a fortune, while people are starving to death out there? Boil rice porridge in the cauldron and let starving people eat it. Make clothes for those who were poorly dressed." From that day on, porridge was boiled in the cauldron every day, with starving people from near and far flocking to the Choi's house.

Even in the years of poor harvest, when tens of thousands of people died of hunger per year, people in Gyeonggju survived as long as they visited the wealthy Choi family. Based on his values in life, Choi created "six principles" as the family code of conduct:

1. Do not take up a government post higher than jinsa (someone who passed the primary state exam only).
2. Do not pile up a fortune larger than ten-thousand seok of rice. If the property exceeds that amount, return the remainder to society.
3. Never purchase land from farmers during a year of bad harvest.
4. Treat passers-by well.
5. Daughters-in-law must wear cotton in the first three years of marriage.
6. Let no one within your sphere starve to death.

The tenets were to encourage the family to be humble enough to live with neighbors in harmony and to take care of needy people, rather than pursuing high government posts for family reputation or individual glory.

On the eve of his death, Choi Guk-seon ordered his son to bring all due bills specifying debts to be collected. He decided to return real estate-related documents to their original owners and burn IOUs for money. As Choi's last wish became generally known, people lined up in front of his house hoping to be tenant farmers on Choi's land. The farmers were eager to work, resulting in high productivity. Of 3,000 seok of rice the Choi family produced each year, the family spent 1,000 seok for passers-by and distributed another 1,000 seok to neighbors in need. Even so, the family was able to accumulate wealth over 12 generations for some 300 years.

However, the family's fame as the privileged rich class ended in the 20th century. The last member of the rich Choi family was Choi Joon, who used up all the family property. He took bank loans, keeping his farmland as collateral, to provide funds for independence activists during the Japanese colonial period. Choi Joon set up a store as a means of helping fund the interim government in Shanghai. In ten years, his debt snowballed to ¥1.3 million, worth 30-thousand seok of rice. Learning about that fact, Japan tortured him severely but he never gave up on his will. After Korea's liberation from Japanese colonial rule, he poured all the remaining properties into the establishment of universities. As a result, he had no money or farmland to pass down to his children. Still, the Choi family descendants are proud of their heritage, and their philanthropy is remembered in Korea to the present day.

== Notes ==
This is the first of the "noblesse oblige" series produced by KBS in 2010, followed by The Great Merchant and Freedom Fighter, Lee Hoe-young.
