= The Great Merchant =

2010 South Korean TV series

- Promotional poster
- Also known as: Merchant Kim Man-deok
- Hangul: 거상 김만덕
- Hanja: 巨商金萬德
- RR: Geosang Gim Mandeok
- MR: Kŏsang Kim Mandŏk
- Genre: Period drama Romance
- Written by: Kim Jin-suk; Kang Da-young
- Directed by: Kang Byung-taek; Kim Seong-yoon
- Starring: Lee Mi-yeon; Han Jae-suk; Park Sol-mi; Ha Seok-jin; Go Doo-shim
- Country of origin: South Korea
- Original languages: Korean; Jeju Language
- No. of episodes: 30

Production
- Producers: Park Ki-ho; Yoo Gun-shik
- Production location: Korea
- Camera setup: Multi-camera
- Running time: Saturdays and Sundays at 20:40 (KST)

Original release
- Network: KBS1
- Release: 6 March – 13 June 2010

The Great Merchant (Korean: 거상 김만덕; lit. 'Merchant Kim Man-deok') is a 2010 South Korean historical drama starring Lee Mi-yeon, Han Jae-suk, Park Sol-mi, Ha Seok-jin, and Go Doo-shim. It aired on KBS1 from March 6 to June 13, 2010 on Saturdays and Sundays at 20:40 for 30 episodes.

The series follows the life of Kim Man-deok (1739-1812). Kim was born on Jeju Island. Adopted by the head of a gisaeng house at the age of 12, she became a government gisaeng ― a type of Korean traditional entertainer who is designated and reserved specifically for government officials. After discovering a talent in business and commerce, she later became one of the most successful female merchants on the island.

When Jeju was struck by a deadly famine in 1795 (the 19th year of King Jeongjo, Kim sold all her assets and donated approximately 90% of her money (approximated to be ₩70 billion in today's currency) to save millions of lives. Kim was later praised by numerous scholars and philosophers, which was notable given her background as a gisaeng and the fact that she saved the people of Jeju Island, a place that was considered a place of exile at the time. Kim's heroic deeds were documented in Jeongjo Sillok ("The Annals of King Jeongjo") in 1796, and was even featured as a folktale called Mandeok-jeon ("The Story of Man-deok"). In 1978, a memorial was created for Kim Man-deok on Jeju Island, and annually Jeju Island presents the "Man-deok Award" to two outstanding women in philanthropy.

The drama features Kim's life and achievements, along with her ongoing rivalry with fellow merchants during the Joseon period.

This is the second of the "noblesse oblige" series produced by KBS in 2010, after The Reputable Family. The third and last part of the series was Freedom Fighter, Lee Hoe-young, which aired on the anniversary of the centenary of the Forced Annexation of Korea by Japan in 2010.

== Synopsis ==
Kim Man-deok was born into the noble class—her mother was a haenyeo of Jeju Island; her father was a high-ranking government official who met Kim's mother during the time he was exiled on Jeju Island. Kim's biological mother, Yi Eun Hong, does not tell her father, Kim Eung Ryul, about her pregnancy, as he and his clan could be punished by execution for inappropriate conduct during his exile. At birth, Kim is named Yi Hong. Her mother dies soon after her birth, leaving her daughter a flute that would one day help her reconnect to her father.

Kim is adopted by Madame Kim, a former palace lady, but who is known to Kim as "Hal-mae" (translated as "Granny"). Managing a training center in Hanyang for orphaned children, Hal-mae teaches the children marketplace skills and trades necessary for them to become successful in the future. During her time with the training center, Kim meets Jung Hong Soo, the son of high-ranking politician, Lord Jung Do-woong. Ill-fated circumstances causes Granny, Dong Ah, and Kim (who is now 12 years old) to run for their lives, forcing them to leave Hanyang and head to Jeju Island. In the process, they find the need to separate but agree to meet in Jeju. Kim is the first to arrive on Jeju Island. Dong Ah finds her, but the two are soon in trouble and they find themselves jailed after an altercation with young Kang Yoo-ji, the later Foreman of West Gate Market Brokers. To keep Dong Ah from undergoing torture, Kim is tricked into agreeing to become the foster daughter of the head gisaeng on Jeju Island. Rather than leave Kim, Dong Ah agrees to become her servant and protector.

Seven years later, Hal-mae finally arrives on Jeju Island and is reunited with Kim and Dong Ah. While Hal-mae tries to get Kim removed from the gisaeng registry, she finds that Kim's gisaeng foster mother and the Assistant Magistrate killed Yi Eun Hong, Kim's mother. To avoid public exposure of their misdeeds, they plot to frame Hal-mae and Kim as if the two were trying to escape the island. Hal-mae learns of the plot and in the process of finding Kim, the two are "caught". Hal-mae is confined in jail, while Kim is sent to the transitory wards (or quarantine camp) for epidemics as punishment. After being rescued from the camp, Kim begins to take care of those in the camp who are suffering from illness. During this time, Kim's father visits the island and discovers the birth of his daughter. Although he cannot publicly acknowledge her as his daughter, he gives her written documentation of her birth registry and bestows upon her the name, Kim Man-deok.

Later, Kim reestablishes East Gate Market Brokers, going into the business of importing and exporting goods between Jeju Island and the Korean mainland, and begins the process of restoring business ethics in Jeju. Kim's former childhood friend, Oh Moon-seon feels a sense of inferiority and underhandedly competes with her as head of West Gate Market Brokers. Man-deok's high standards and business ethics cause her business to thrive, while Madame Oh's jealousy and resentment of Kim, as well as her greed for wealth and power, eventually lead to her demise.

Transcending her lowly status as a gisaeng, as well as the restraints of her birthplace (Jeju Island was considered to be a remote place of exile during that time period), Kim Man-deok becomes the most successful female merchant of the Joseon period and one of the richest people on Jeju Island. A severe famine strikes Jeju Island in 1795, obliterating one-third of its population. Man-deok sells all her assets to help feed the starving people of her island, saving countless lives. In 1796, Kim travels to Hanyang (modern day, Seoul) to meet King Jeongjo, who bestows upon her the honorary title and position, Female Physician of the Palace Dispensary, as reward for her benevolous deeds.

== Cast ==
- Lee Mi-yeon as Kim Man-deok/Yi Hong
  - Shim Eun-kyung as Hong (young Yi Hong)

Daughter of Lord Kim Eung-ryul and Yi Eun-hong, a commoner from Jeju Island.

- Han Jae-suk as Jung Hong-soo
  - Do Ji-han as young Hong-soo

Son of Lord Jung Do-woong; Assistant Section Chief of Board of Punishments; formerly Captain of Commerce Control Bureau.

- Park Sol-mi as Oh Moon-seon, "Madam Oh"
  - Joo Da-young as Mak-soon (young Moon-seon)

Stepmother of Kang Yoo-ji; owner of West Gate Market Brokers.

- Ha Seok-jin as Kang Yoo-ji

Stepson of Oh Moon-seon; Foreman, West Gate Market Brokers.

- Go Doo-shim as Hal-mae, "Granny"

Formerly Palace Matron Kim.

- Kim Cheol-ki as Dong-ah
- Lee Mi-ji as Deok-pal's mother
- Lee Byung-wook as Kim Pan-sool

Junior Foreman of East Gate.

- Kim Kap-soo as Kang Kye-man
- Kim Myung-kook as Choi Nam-gu

Assistant Magistrate

- Kim Kyu-chul as Steward Oh
- Lee Dal-hyung as Kim Dong-joo
- Kim Sun-kyung as Myo-hyang
- Shim Eun-jin as Yo-hwa

Gisaeng.

- Jo Yang-ja as Chok-sae's mother

Cook at gisaeng house.

- Park Soon-chun as Yeong Cheon-daek
- Choi Jae-sung as Lord Kim Eung-ryul

Father of Kim Man-deok; Inspector, Commerce Control Bureau.

- Kim Byung-ki as Lord Jung Do-woong

Father of Jung Hong-soo; Minister, Board of Punishments.

- Choo So-young as Eun-hong
- Lee Deok-hee as Jung Hong-soo's mother
- Song Yong-tae as Go Seok-joo

Senior Foreman, East Gate Market Brokers.

- Jeon Ye-seo as Baek Jo-rye
- Jo Jae-wan as Deok-pal
- Oh Yeon-seo as Lee Eun
- Jung Soo-young as Kim Seo-joo
- Jo Byung-gi as Lee Bang
- Jung Jong-joon as Mu Maeng-dal

Loan shark.

- Jung Joo-hee as Holjjugi
- Kang Min-suk as Chil-bok
- Maeng Ho-rim as Minister Chae
- Yoo Yeon-mi as Kkot-nim
- Kim Sung-hoon as Wal-pae
- Im Hyuk
- Lee Joo-yeon
- ? as Chief Clerk Kang
- ? as Captain Hwang
- ? as merchant seeking deer antlers at East Gate
- ? as Skipper Jang
- ? as cook
- ? as black cow rancher
