= Loveholic (TV series) =

- Written by: Lee Hyang-hee
- Directed by: Lee Gun-joon; Moon Joon-ha; Kim Kyu-tae
- Starring: Kangta; Kim Gyu-ri (Note: Credited as Kim Min-sun.); Lee Sun-kyun; Yoo In-young
- Country of origin: South Korea
- No. of episodes: 16

Production
- Producer: Jang Sung-hyo
- Running time: Mondays and Tuesdays at 21:55 (KST)

Original release
- Network: Korean Broadcasting System
- Release: May 2 – June 21, 2005

Loveholic (Korean: 러브홀릭; RR: Reobeuhollik) is a 2005 South Korean television series starring Kangta, Kim Gyu-ri, Lee Sun-kyun and Yoo In-young. It aired on KBS2 from May 2 to June 21, 2005 on Mondays and Tuesdays at 21:55 for 16 episodes.

== Plot ==
In a high school in Chuncheon, a rebellious, disobedient student named Seo Kang-wook meets a young and naive teacher Lee Yeol-joo, and despite everything, they fall in love.

Initially, Yeol-joo paid a lot of attention to Kang-wook, recognizing his inherent intelligence and talent and hoping to steer him to the good path. This attention later coalesced into attraction and then love, grudgingly admitted. Yeol-joo herself was in an apparently steady relationship with a promising police inspector, Kim Tae-hyun, who cares for her a whole lot more than she does in return.

A narcoleptic, Yeol-joo accidentally kills one of Kang-wook's friends, but she passes out and remembers nothing. To protect her, Kang-wook takes the blame and goes to jail, but not before convincing Yeol-joo that her memory of killing the man was just an episode of narcoleptic hallucination.

Five years later, Kang-wook finishes his sentence, but Yeol-joo is now engaged to Tae-hyun. Still unaware that she is the real killer, both Kang-wook and Tae-hyun work together to protect her from the truth. Later learning what sacrifice he has made for her, Yeol-joo wants to return to Kang-wook, but this time Kang-wook is not alone—Ja-kyung, his former classmate and currently a radio program host, is beside him. The circumstances hamper Yeol-joo from loving Kang-wook, but she is desperate to help him recover the lost five years and become a top-notch cook.

== Cast ==
=== Main cast ===
- Kangta as Seo Kang-wook
- Kim Gyu-ri as Lee Yeol-joo
- Lee Sun-kyun as Kim Tae-hyun
- Yoo In-young as Yoon Ja-kyung

=== Supporting cast ===
- Kang In-hyung as Jung Ho-tae
- Jung Hye-sun as Jo In-ja (Kang-wook's grandmother)
- Yang Geum-seok as Park Soo-jin (Tae-hyun's mother)
- Jung Dong-hwan as Kim Soo-bong (Tae-hyun's father)
- Lee Hye-sook as Im Young-ae (Yeol-joo's mother)
- Lee Kyung-pyo as Cha Hwa-young (Ja-kyung's mother)
- Park Hyo-jun as Park Kyung-oh
- Jung Eun-pyo as Han Young-gil
- Kim Hee-chul as Joo Ho (Bit part appearance)
