= Drama City =

South Korean anthology television series

- Hangul: 드라마 시티
- RR: Deurama siti
- MR: Tŭrama sit'i
- Genre: Drama
- Starring: Various actors
- Country of origin: South Korea
- Original language: Korean

Production
- Production location: South Korea
- Running time: Sunday 22:00 (until May 1, 2005), Saturday 23:15 (since May 7, 2005)

Original release
- Network: KBS (KBS1 and KBS2)
- Release: November 30, 1984 – March 29, 2008

Drama City (Korean: 드라마 시티) is an anthology television series that was broadcast by Korea Broadcasting System (KBS) via KBS2TV from 1984 to 2008.

1984's "Drama Game" lost its popularity several times since 1997, and the title, broadcast time was moved to late night hours. In 2007 MBC the longevity of a similar nature "Best Theater" that aired after stopping South Korea's broadcasting "HDTV's Literature" by abolishing in 2007 from the current terrestrial broadcasting was the only remaining act play series. And the type of material to test an experimental stage, but it was a classic in terms of audience and advertising revenue.

Due to operating losses in spring 2008 it was decided to abolish the target program. The director and writers, such as the abolition of all walks of life, but opposition to the decision, March 29, 2008. Previously, for the purpose of drama airing time two Bukkaji City and was made the first four episodes of "TV City will live to regret for the things knowingly committing" a "special theme drama" in the name of June 8, 2008, 9, 16 days, 9 15 (Chuseok holidays) are shown in episodes 1, 2009 Angkor was televised on New Year's holiday period.

Republic of Korea in the broadcast program for viewing on a television show age rating system in 2002 as the first test conducted was also applied.

== Episodes ==
=== 2004 ===
Date	Title	Cast
July 25, 2004	Anagram / 아나그램	Kim Yoon-seok, Ahn Nae-sang, Chae Gook-hee, Koo Hye-sun, Lee Dae-yeon
August 8, 2004	Deja-vu / 데자뷰	Kim Heung-soo, Han Ji-min, Lee Byung-wook, Shin Goo

=== 2005 ===
Date	Title	Cast
January 2, 2005	Oh! Sarah / 오!사라	Lee Min-ki, Seo Do-young
January 9, 2005	Memory / 메모리	Han Ji-min, Park Joon-suk, Kim Hyun-sung
July 30, 2005	All Together Cha Cha Cha / 다 함께 차차차	Koo Hye-sun, Lee Pil-mo
November 19, 2005	My Sweet Bloody Lover / 나의 달콤한 피투성이 연인	Kim Ji-woo, Song Chang-eui
November 26, 2005	Shi-eun & Su-ha / 시은&수하	Jeong Hoo, Greena Park, Kim Han, Yoo Ah-in

=== 2006 ===
Date	Title	Cast
2006-May-27	Fog Street / 안개시정거리	Kim Jeong-hoon

=== 2007 ===
Date	Title	Cast
October 6, 2007	Hot-tempered Mi Sook / 쌈닭 미숙이	Park Won-sang, Oh Yong, Jang Young-nam, Jung Won-joong, Jung Kyu-soo, Kim Sun-hwa, Lee Han-wi

== See also ==
- KBS Drama Special
- Drama Special Series
- Drama City: What Should I Do?
- Pianist
