= Lee Sung-kyung filmography =

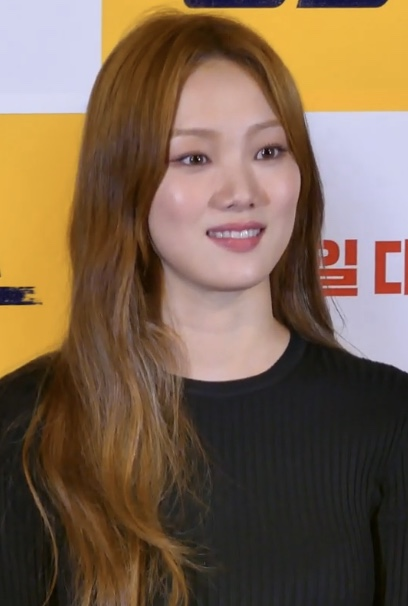
- Lee in 2019
- Film: 4
- Television series: 14
- Web series: 1
- Television show: 5
- Hosting: 4
- Music videos: 6

Lee Sung-kyung (Korean: 이성경; born August 10, 1990), is a South Korean model, singer and actress.

== Film ==
Year	Title	Role	Notes	Ref.
2017	Trolls	Poppy	Voice (Korean dub)	
2018	Love+Sling	Ga-young		
2019	Miss & Mrs. Cops	Jo Ji-hye		
2020	Heart Attack (하트어택)		Short film	

== Television series ==
Year	Title	Role	Notes	Ref.
2014	It's Okay, That's Love	Oh So-nyeo		
2015	Flower of Queen	Kang Yi-sol		
2016	Cheese in the Trap	Baek In-ha		
2016	The Doctors	Jin Seo-woo		
2016	Weightlifting Fairy Kim Bok-joo	Kim Bok-joo		
2017	While You Were Sleeping	Woman in the couple	Cameo (episode 11)	
2018	About Time	Choi Michaela		
2020	Once Again	Ji Sun-kyung	Cameo (episode 53)	
2020	Record of Youth	Jin Seo-woo	Cameo (episode 12)	
2020–2023	Dr. Romantic	Cha Eun-jae	Season 2–3	
2022	Shooting Stars	Oh Han-byeol		
2024	Doctor Slump	Han Woo-ri	Cameo (episode 6)	
2024	The Player 2: Master of Swindlers	Leah	Cameo (episode 12)	
2025	The Nice Guy	Kang Mi-young		
2026	In Your Radiant Season	Song Ha-ran		

== Web series ==
Year	Title	Role	Notes	Ref.
2023	Call lt Love	Shim Woo-joo		

== Television shows ==
Year	Title	Role	Notes	Ref.
2015	King of Mask Singer	Contestant	As Flower Crab Holding Flowers (Episode 19–20)	
2018	Now Playing in Theaters: Childish Bromance (절찬상영중: 철부지 브로망스)	Cast member		
2019	1919–2019, Memories	Narrator	Episode 40: Yoon Hee-sun	
2024	Road to Paris	Narrator	Weightlifting Park Hye-jung	
2024	Starlight Boys	MC		

== Hosting ==
Year	Title	Notes	Ref.
2015	2015 MBC Drama Awards	With Shin Dong-yup	
2016	2016 MBC Entertainment Awards	With Kim Sung-joo and Jun Hyun-moo	
2018	32nd Golden Disc Awards	With Lee Seung-gi	
2018	3rd Asia Artist Awards	With Leeteuk	

== Music video appearances ==
Year	Song title	Artist	Ref.
2015	"Two One Two"	Urban Zakapa	
2016	"Re-Bye"	Akdong Musician	
2017	"When We Were Two"	Urban Zakapa	
2018	"I Can't Say That"	Kim Na-young	
2020	"Reconnect"	Code Kunst, Simon Dominic and Choi Jong-hoon	
2023	"Eat Sleep Live Repeat"	Lee Sung-kyung, Lee Chan-hyuk (AKMU)	
