= 4th APAN Star Awards =

2015 edition of award ceremony

- Date: November 28, 2015
- Site: Wonju Gymnasium, Wonju, Gangwon Province
- Hosted by: Lee Hwi-jae; Kim Sung-joo; Lee Hoon; Park So-yeon

Television coverage
- Network: MBC Every 1

The 4th APAN Star Awards ceremony was held on November 28, 2015, at Wonju Gymnasium in Wonju, Gangwon Province and was broadcast live on MBC Every 1 and V Live. Lee Hwi-jae, Kim Sung-joo, Lee Hoon and T-ara's Park So-yeon were the host of the award ceremony. First held in 2012, the annual awards ceremony recognizes the excellence in South Korea's television. The nominees were chosen from 98 Korean dramas that aired on broadcasting networks MBC, KBS and SBS and cable channels tvN, jtbc, OCN, MBN and TV Chosun from October 1, 2014, to October 30, 2015.

The highest honor of the ceremony, Grand Prize (Daesang), was awarded to the actor Kim Soo-hyun of the drama series The Producers.

== Nominations and winners ==
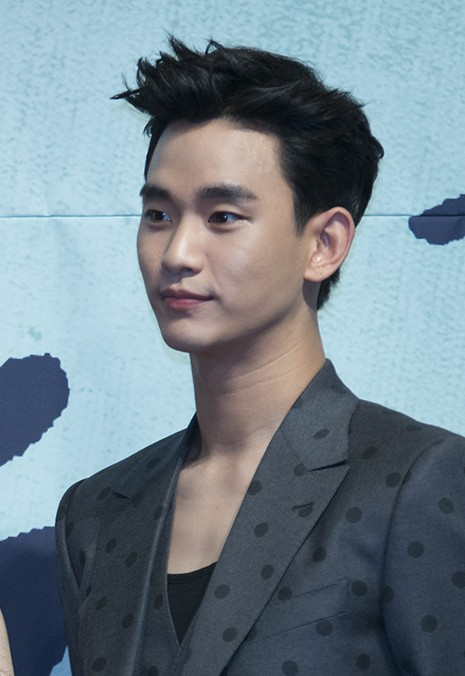
Kim Soo-hyun — Grand Prize (Daesang) winner for The Producers

Winners are listed first, highlighted in boldface, and indicated with a dagger (†).

**Grand Prize (Daesang)**: **Kim Soo-hyun** - **The Producers** †
**Top Excellence Award, Actor in a Miniseries**: **Lee Sung-min** - **Misaeng: Incomplete Life** †; Ji Sung - Kill Me, Heal Me; Joo Won - Naeil's Cantabile, Yong-pal; Kim Rae-won - Punch; Kim Soo-hyun - The Producers	**Top Excellence Award, Actress in a Miniseries**: **Kim Hee-sun** - **Angry Mom** †; Gong Hyo-jin - The Producers; Kim Tae-hee - Yong-pal; Park Shin-hye - Pinocchio; Soo Ae - Mask
**Top Excellence Award, Actor in a Serial Drama**: **Kim Sang-joong** - **The Jingbirok: A Memoir of Imjin War** †; Cha Seung-won - Splendid Politics; Jang Hyuk - Shine or Go Crazy, The Merchant: Gaekju 2015; Ji Jin-hee - I Have a Lover; Yoo Jun-sang - Heard It Through the Grapevine	**Top Excellence Award, Actress in a Serial Drama**: **Kim Hyun-joo** - **I Have a Lover** †; Chae Shi-ra - Unkind Ladies; Han Ji-hye - 4 Legendary Witches; Kim Jung-eun - Make a Woman Cry; Yoo Ho-jeong - Heard It Through the Grapevine
**Excellence Award, Actor in a Miniseries**: **Yim Si-wan** - **Misaeng: Incomplete Life** †; Ji Chang-wook - Healer; Jo Jung-suk - Oh My Ghost; Lee Sang-yoon - Liar Game, Twenty Again; Park Seo-joon - Kill Me, Heal Me, She Was Pretty	**Excellence Award, Actress in a Miniseries**: **Park Bo-young** - **Oh My Ghost** †; IU - The Producers; Kang So-ra - Misaeng: Incomplete Life, Warm and Cozy; Kim Sa-rang - This is My Love; Shin Se-kyung - A Girl Who Sees Smells
**Excellence Award, Actor in a Serial Drama**: **Lee Joon** - **Heard It Through the Grapevine** †; Ha Seok-jin - 4 Legendary Witches; Jae Hee - Save the Family; Lee Sang-woo - All About My Mom; Song Chang-eui - Make a Woman Cry	**Excellence Award, Actress in a Serial Drama**: **Kim Min-jung** - **The Merchant: Gaekju 2015** †; Eugene - All About My Mom; Go Ah-sung - Heard It Through the Grapevine; Han Chae-ah - The Merchant: Gaekju 2015; Kim Sung-ryung - Flower of Queen
**Best Supporting Actor**: **Lee Geung-young** - **Misaeng: Incomplete Life** †; Jang Hyun-sung - Punch, Heard It Through the Grapevine; Kim Dae-myung - Misaeng: Incomplete Life; Kim Tae-woo - The Jingbirok: A Memoir of Imjin War; Park Hyuk-kwon - Punch	**Best Supporting Actress**: **Chae Jung-an** - **Yong-pal** †; **Gil Hae-yeon** - **Heard It Through the Grapevine** †; Do Ji-won - Healer, Unkind Ladies; Hwang Seok-jeong - She Was Pretty; Lee Ha-nui - Shine or Go Crazy
**Best New Actor**: **Byun Yo-han** - **Misaeng: Incomplete Life** †; **Nam Joo-hyuk** - **Who Are You: School 2015** †; Kang Ha-neul - Misaeng: Incomplete Life; Park Bo-gum - Naeil's Cantabile, Hello Monster; Yook Sungjae - Who Are You: School 2015	**Best New Actress**: **Chae Soo-bin** - **House of Bluebird** †; **Lim Ji-yeon** - **High Society** †; Baek Ji-yeon - Heard It Through the Grapevine; Kim Seolhyun - Orange Marmalade; Lee Sung-kyung - Flower of Queen
**Best Young Actor**: **Nam Da-reum** - **Pinocchio** †	**Best Young Actress**: **Kal So-won** - **My Daughter, Geum Sa-wol** †
**Best Production Director**: **Jo Soo-won** - **Pinocchio** †	**Best Writer**: **Park Kyung-soo** - **Punch** †
**Best Original Soundtrack**: **"Pinocchio" (Roy Kim)** - **Pinocchio** †	**SNS Web Drama Award**: **Xiumin** - **Falling for Challenge** †
**Popular Star Award, Actor**: **Son Ho-jun** - **Mrs. Cop** †	**Popular Star Award, Actress**: **Yoo In-young** - **Mask** †
**Hallyu Star Award**: **Lee Dong-gun** †; **Hong Soo-ah** †	**Best Dressed**: **Oh Min-suk** - **All About My Mom** †; **Choi Yeo-jin** - **The Lover** †
**Best Manager**: **Shim Jung-woon**, **Sim Entertainment** †	**Achievement Award**: **Chief Inspector** †
