= 2015 MBC Drama Awards =

34th edition of award ceremony

- Date: December 30, 2015
- Site: MBC HQ, Sangam-dong, Seoul
- Hosted by: Shin Dong-yup; Lee Sung-kyung
- Official website: 2015 MBC 연기대상

Highlights
- Best Drama Serial: Kill Me, Heal Me
- Grand Prize (Daesang): Ji Sung

Television coverage
- Network: MBC

The 2015 MBC Drama Awards, presented by Munhwa Broadcasting Corporation (MBC) took place on December 30, 2015. It was hosted by Shin Dong-yup and Lee Sung-kyung. Two new categories were awarded: "Top 10 Stars Award" and "Best Supporting Actor".

== Winners and nominees ==
- Winners denoted in **bold**
- The Grand Prize (Daesang) has been determined through viewer's votes since 2014, and not by a professional set of judges.

Grand Prize (Daesang)	Drama of the Year
**Ji Sung** – **Kill Me, Heal Me**; Cha Seung-won – Splendid Politics; Hwang Jung-eum – Kill Me, Heal Me, She Was Pretty; Jeon In-hwa – 4 Legendary Witches, My Daughter, Geum Sa-wol; Kim Hee-sun – Angry Mom; Kim Jung-eun – Make a Woman Cry	**Kill Me, Heal Me**; 4 Legendary Witches; Make a Woman Cry; My Daughter, Geum Sa-wol; She Was Pretty
Top Excellence Award, Actor in a Miniseries	Top Excellence Award, Actress in a Miniseries
**Ji Sung** – **Kill Me, Heal Me**; Ji Hyun-woo – Angry Mom; Jung Joon-ho – Sweet, Savage Family; Lee Joon-gi – The Scholar Who Walks the Night	**Hwang Jung-eum** – **Kill Me, Heal Me**, **She Was Pretty**; Kim Hee-sun – Angry Mom; Moon Jeong-hee – Sweet, Savage Family
Top Excellence Award, Actor in a Special Project Drama	Top Excellence Award, Actress in a Special Project Drama
**Jung Jin-young** – **Glamorous Temptation**; Cha Seung-won – Splendid Politics; Jang Hyuk – Shine or Go Crazy; Lee Jong-hyuk – Flower of Queen	**Jeon In-hwa** – **4 Legendary Witches**, **My Daughter, Geum Sa-wol**; Choi Kang-hee – Glamorous Temptation; Kim Sung-ryung – Flower of Queen; Oh Yeon-seo – Shine or Go Crazy
Top Excellence Award, Actor in a Serial Drama	Top Excellence Award, Actress in a Serial Drama
**Song Chang-eui** – **Make a Woman Cry**; Ahn Jae-mo – The Great Wives; Jeong Bo-seok – A Daughter Just Like You	**Kim Jung-eun** – **Make a Woman Cry**; Kang Sung-yeon – The Great Wives; Kim Hye-ok – A Daughter Just Like You; Park Sun-young – Lady of the Storm
Excellence Award, Actor in a Miniseries	Excellence Award, Actress in a Miniseries
**Park Seo-joon** – **Kill Me, Heal Me**, **She Was Pretty**; Choi Si-won – She Was Pretty; Jung Woong-in – Sweet, Savage Family; Yoo Yeon-seok – Warm and Cozy	**Kang So-ra** – **Warm and Cozy**; Go Joon-hee – She Was Pretty; Lee Yu-bi – The Scholar Who Walks the Night; Oh Yoon-ah – Angry Mom
Excellence Award, Actor in a Special Project Drama	Excellence Award, Actress in a Special Project Drama
**Son Chang-min** – **My Daughter, Geum Sa-wol**; Joo Sang-wook – Glamorous Temptation; Kim Jaewon – Splendid Politics; Yoon Hyun-min – My Daughter, Geum Sa-wol	**Oh Hyun-kyung** – **4 Legendary Witches**; Baek Jin-hee – My Daughter, Geum Sa-wol; Kim Mi-sook – Flower of Queen; Lee Yeon-hee – Splendid Politics; Park Won-sook – My Daughter, Geum Sa-wol
Excellence Award, Actor in a Serial Drama	Excellence Award, Actress in a Serial Drama
**Park Yeong-gyu** – **My Mom**; Kang Kyung-joon – A Daughter Just Like You; Oh Dae-gyu – Make a Woman Cry	**Cha Hwa-yeon** – **My Mom**; Ha Hee-ra – Make a Woman Cry; Kim Ji-young – The Great Wives; Woo Hee-jin – A Daughter Just Like You
Best Supporting Actor in a Miniseries	Best Supporting Actress in a Miniseries
**Kim Hee-won** – **Angry Mom**; Ahn Se-ha – She Was Pretty; Kim Sung-oh – Warm and Cozy; Lee Sung-jae – Warm and Cozy	**Hwang Seok-jeong** – **She Was Pretty**; Go Soo-hee – Angry Mom; Kim Hee-jung – Warm and Cozy; Shin Dong-mi – She Was Pretty
Best Supporting Actor in a Special Project Drama	Best Supporting Actress in a Special Project Drama
**Kim Ho-jin** – **Glamorous Temptation**; Choi Dae-chul – My Daughter, Geum Sa-wol; Jo Han-chul – Flower of Queen; Jung Woong-in – Splendid Politics	**Kim Soo-mi** – **4 Legendary Witches**; Do Ji-won – My Daughter, Geum Sa-wol; Jang Young-nam – Glamorous Temptation, Flower of Queen; Na Young-hee – Glamorous Temptation
Best Supporting Actor in a Serial Drama	Best Supporting Actress in a Serial Drama
**Lee Moon-sik** – **My Mom**; In Gyo-jin – Make a Woman Cry; Kang Sung-min – A Daughter Just Like You; Lee Jong-won – The Great Wives	**Lee Bo-hee** – **Apgujeong Midnight Sun**; Jin Hee-kyung – My Mom; Jin Ye-sol – The Great Wives; Kim Ji-young – Make a Woman Cry
Best New Actor in a Miniseries	Best New Actress in a Miniseries
**Lee Soo-hyuk** – **The Scholar Who Walks the Night**; Baro – Angry Mom; Ji Soo – Angry Mom; Park Yu-hwan – She Was Pretty	**Lee Yu-bi** – **The Scholar Who Walks the Night**; Kim So-eun – The Scholar Who Walks the Night; Lizzy – Angry Mom; Shin Hye-sun – She Was Pretty
Best New Actor in a Special Project Drama	Best New Actress in a Special Project Drama
**Yoon Hyun-min** – **My Daughter, Geum Sa-wol**; Do Sang-woo – My Daughter, Geum Sa-wol; Nam Joo-hyuk – Glamorous Temptation; Seo Kang-joon – Splendid Politics; Yoon Park – Flower of Queen	**Lee Sung-kyung** – **Flower of Queen**; Ha Yeon-soo – 4 Legendary Witches; Park Se-young – My Daughter, Geum Sa-wol; Song Ha-yoon – My Daughter, Geum Sa-wol
Best New Actor in a Serial Drama	Best New Actress in a Serial Drama
**Kang Eun-tak** – **Apgujeong Midnight Sun**; Lee Dong-ha – Eve's Love; Na Jong-chan – My Mom; Yoon Jong-hoon – A Daughter Just Like You	**Park Ha-na** – **Apgujeong Midnight Sun**; Choi Ye-seul – Angry Mom, My Mom; Jung Hye-sung – A Daughter Just Like You; Min Do-hee – My Mom
Best Young Actor	Best Young Actress
**Yang Han-yeol** – **She Was Pretty**	**Kal So-won** – **My Daughter, Geum Sa-wol**, **Glamorous Temptation**
Popularity Award, Actor	Popularity Award, Actress
**Park Seo-joon** – **Kill Me, Heal Me**, **She Was Pretty**; Cha Seung-won – Splendid Politics; Choi Si-won – She Was Pretty; Jang Hyuk – Shine or Go Crazy; Ji Hyun-woo – Angry Mom; Ji Sung – Kill Me, Heal Me; Joo Sang-wook – Glamorous Temptation; Lee Jong-hyuk – Flower of Queen; Lee Joon-gi – The Scholar Who Walks the Night; Seo Kang-joon – Splendid Politics; Song Chang-eui – Make a Woman Cry; Yoo Yeon-seok – Warm and Cozy; Yoon Hyun-min – My Daughter, Geum Sa-wol; Yoon Park – Flower of Queen	**Hwang Jung-eum** – **Kill Me, Heal Me**, **She Was Pretty**; Baek Jin-hee – My Daughter, Geum Sa-wol; Choi Kang-hee – Glamorous Temptation; Go Joon-hee – She Was Pretty; Jeon In-hwa – 4 Legendary Witches, My Daughter, Geum Sa-wol; Kang So-ra – Warm and Cozy; Kim Hee-sun – Angry Mom; Kim Jung-eun – Make a Woman Cry; Kim Sung-ryung – Flower of Queen; Kim Yoo-jung – Angry Mom; Lee Sung-kyung – Flower of Queen; Lee Yeon-hee – Splendid Politics; Lee Yu-bi – The Scholar Who Walks the Night; Oh Yeon-seo – Shine or Go Crazy
Best Couple Award	Writer of the Year
**Ji Sung** and **Park Seo-joon** – **Kill Me, Heal Me**; Jang Hyuk and Oh Yeon-seo – Shine or Go Crazy; Ji Soo and Kim Hee-sun – Angry Mom; Ji Sung and Hwang Jung-eum – Kill Me, Heal Me; Lee Jong-hyuk and Kim Sung-ryung – Flower of Queen; Lee Joon-gi and Lee Yu-bi – The Scholar Who Walks the Night; Park Seo-joon and Hwang Jung-eum – She Was Pretty; Park Yeong-gyu and Cha Hwa-yeon – My Mom; Song Chang-eui and Kim Jung-eun – Make a Woman Cry; Yoo Yeon-seok and Kang So-ra – Warm and Cozy; Yoon Hyun-min and Baek Jin-hee – My Daughter, Geum Sa-wol; Yoon Park and Lee Sung-kyung – Flower of Queen	**Ha Chung-ok** – **Make a Woman Cry**; **Jo Sung-hee** – **She Was Pretty**
PD Award	Best Dubber Award
**Hwang Jung-eum** – **Kill Me, Heal Me**, **She Was Pretty**	**Jeong Jae-heon**
Top 10 Stars Award
**Baek Jin-hee** – **My Daughter, Geum Sa-wol**; **Cha Seung-won** – **Splendid Politics**; **Hwang Jung-eum** – **Kill Me, Heal Me**, **She Was Pretty**; **Ji Sung** – **Kill Me, Heal Me**; **Kim Hee-sun** – **Angry Mom**; **Kim Sung-ryung** – **Flower of Queen**; **Kim Yoo-jung** – **Angry Mom**; **Lee Joon-gi** – **The Scholar Who Walks the Night**; **Park Seo-joon** – **Kill Me, Heal Me**, **She Was Pretty**; **Yoo Yeon-seok** – **Warm and Cozy**
