= Yoon Park =

South Korean actor (born 1987)

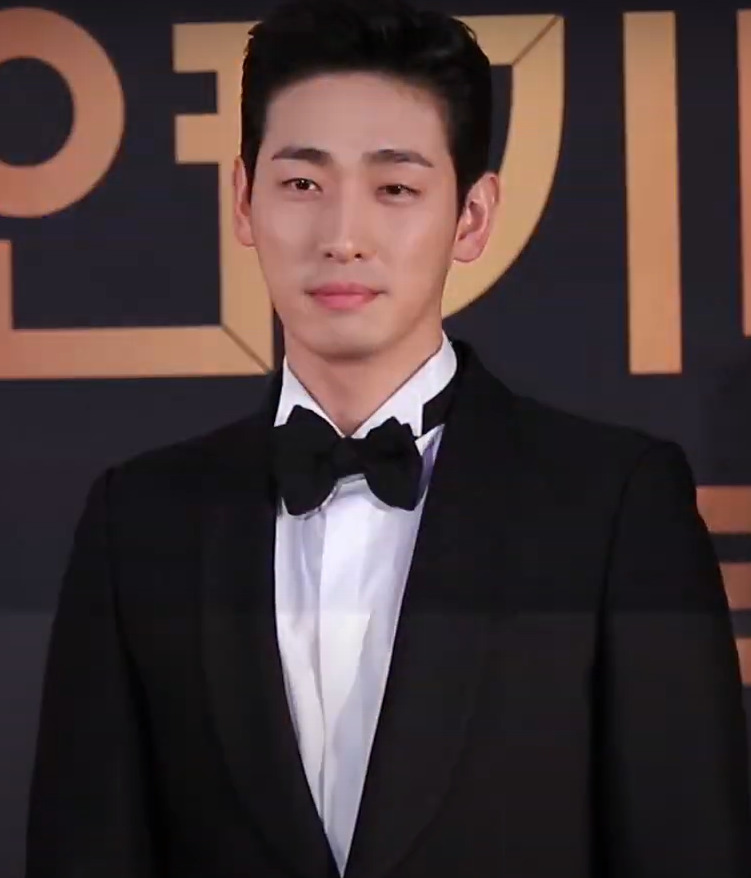
- Yoon in 2019
- Born: November 18, 1987 (age 38); Seoul, South Korea
- Education: Korea National University of Arts (Acting Department)
- Occupation: Actor
- Years active: 2012–present
- Agent: Blitzway Entertainment
- Spouse: Kim Soo-bin (m. 2023)
- Children: 1

Korean name
- Hangul: 윤박
- Hanja: 尹博
- RR: Yun Bak
- MR: Yun Pak

Yoon Park (Korean: 윤박; born November 18, 1987) is a South Korean actor.

== Career ==
Yoon began his entertainment career as a drummer for the band Can't Play Well (Korean: 못 노는 애들), which won the Bronze Prize at the 34th MBC Campus Song Festival in 2010. When his contract with agency S.M. Entertainment expired, he joined JYP Entertainment in 2013. Yoon had starring roles in the television dramas What Happens to My Family? (2014) and Flower of Queen (2015).

In June 2021, Yoon signed with new agency H& Entertainment.

== Personal life ==
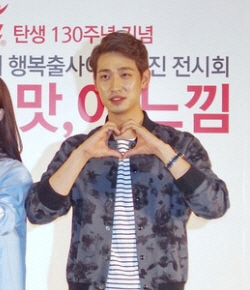
Yoon in May 2016

On May 3, 2023, Yoon announced his engagement to model Kim Soo-bin through a handwritten letter to fans. The couple married on September 2, 2023, in Seoul surrounded by friends and family. In December 2025, Blitzway Entertainment announced that Kim was pregnant with the couple's first child. On January 22, 2026, Yoon's agency announced that Kim had recently given birth to a son.

== Ambassadorship ==
- Honorary Probation Officer for Ministry of Justice (2023–present)

== Filmography ==
=== Film ===
Year	Title	Role	Notes	Ref.
2013	Tenderly Crunch	Sang-yeop	Short film	
2013	Psychometry	Bad student		
2014	Romance in Seoul	Sang-won		
2018	The Soup	Jae-goo		
2019	Jesters: The Game Changers	Jin Sang		
2023	Swallow	Seo Jin-woo		

=== Television series ===
Year	Title	Role	Notes	Ref.
2012	Read My Lips	Yoon Bak		
2012	To My Beloved	Park Ho-ki		
2012	Glass Mask	Kang Gun		
2012	Do You Know Taekwondo?	Seok-ho	KBS Drama Special	
2013	Puberty Medley	Lee Won-il	Drama Special Series	
2013	Good Doctor	Woo Il-kyu		
2013	A Little Love Never Hurts	Kim Joon-sung		
2014	What Happens to My Family?	Cha Kang-jae		
2014	Discovery of Love		Cameo (Episode 2)	
2014	Reset	Kim In-seok	Cameo (Episode 1)	
2015	Flower of Queen	Park Jae-joon		
2016	Come Back Mister	Jung Ji-hoon		
2016	Hello, My Twenties!	Park Jae-won	Season 1	
2016	Uncontrollably Fond	Seo Yoon-hoo	Cameo (Episode 12)	
2017	Introverted Boss	Kang Woo-il		
2017	Hello, My Twenties! 2	Park Jae-won	Cameo (Episode 14)	
2017	The Package	Yoon Soo-soo's brother		
2018	Radio Romance	Lee Kang		
2018	The Tuna and the Dolphin	Han Woo	One act-drama	
2018	Room No. 9	Chu Young-bae	Cameo	
2019	Legal High	Kang Ki-seok		
2019	The Crowned Clown	Giseunggun	Cameo (Episode 16)	
2019–2020	Beautiful Love, Wonderful Life	Moon Tae-rang		
2020	Itaewon Class	Sung-hyun	Cameo (Episode 3)	
2020	Mystic Pop-up Bar	actor in the film The Gout Lovers	Cameo (Episode 6)	
2020	Search	Song Min-gyu		
2020	Birthcare Center	Kim Do-Yoon		
2021	You Are My Spring	Chae Jun / Dr. Ian Chase		
2022	Forecasting Love and Weather	Han Ki-joon		
2022	Gaus Electronics	Manager Bae Soo-jin	Special appearance	
2022	Fanletter, Please!	Bang Jeong-seok		
2023	Delightfully Deceitful	Go Yo-han		
2024	Doctor Slump	Bin Dae-yeong		
2024	Cinderella at 2 AM	Seo Si-won		
2025	The Witch		Cameo (Episode 1)	
2025	For Eagle Brothers	Oh Beom-soo		

=== Web series ===
Year	Title	Role	Notes	Ref.
2014	Flirty Boy and Girl	Man #6 playboy		
2015	Lily Fever	Gu Nam		
2016	The Cravings	Yoon Park	Season 2	
2017	Magic School	Jay		

=== Television shows ===
Year	Title	Role	Notes	Ref.
2016	Daddy and I	Cast member		
2016	Law of the Jungle	Cast member	Episodes 220–224	
2017	Battle Trip	Contestant	with Hong Seok-cheon; episodes 54–55	
2019	Law of the Jungle	Cast Member	Episodes 358–360	
2021	On & Off	Cast Member		
2022	Great Seoul Invasion	Host		
2025	Baseball Representative	Host		

=== Radio shows ===
Year	Title	Role	Ref.
2022	This is Ahn Young-mi and Muzie, the date at two o'clock	Special DJ	

=== Music video appearances ===
Year	Title	Artist
2009	"Second Impression (First Impression 2)"	Jiggy Fellaz feat. Vasco & Marco
2010	"Tonight, I'm Afraid of the Dark"	10cm
2014	"Full Moon"	Sunmi
2014	"Over the Destiny"	2AM
2020	"I Need You"	Baek A-yeon

== Theatre ==
Year	Title		Role	Venue	Date	Ref.
Year	English	Korean	Role	Venue	Date	Ref.
2014	Offending the Audience	관객모독		Art One Theater Hall 2	March 7–August 10	
2016	Mangwon-dong Brothers	망원동 브라더스	Oh Young-joon	Mapo Art Centre Play Mac	July 15–August 21	
2017	Three Days of Rain	3일간의 비	Walker & Ned	Art One Theatre 2	July 11–September 10	

== Accolades ==
=== Awards and nominations ===
Name of the award ceremony, year presented, category, nominee of the award, and the result of the nomination
Award ceremony	Year	Category	Nominee / Work	Result	Ref.
APAN Star Awards	2021	Excellence Award, Actor in Serial Drama	Beautiful Love, Wonderful Life	Nominated	
KBS Drama Awards	2018	Excellence Award, Actor in a One Act/Special/Short Drama	The Tuna and the Dolphin	Won	
KBS Drama Awards	2019	Excellence Award, Actor in a Serial Drama	Beautiful Love, Wonderful Life	Nominated	
KBS Drama Awards	2019	Best Couple Award	Yoon Park (with Jo Yoon-hee); Beautiful Love, Wonderful Life	Nominated	
KBS Drama Awards	2025	Excellence Award, Actor in a Serial Drama	For Eagle Brothers	Won	
KBS Drama Awards	2025	Best Couple Award	Yoon Park (with Lee Bom); For Eagle Brothers	Won	
MBC Drama Awards	2015	Best New Actor in a Special Project Drama	Flower of Queen	Nominated	
MBC Drama Awards	2015	Best Couple Award	Yoon Park (with Lee Sung-kyung); Flower of Queen	Nominated	
MBC Drama Awards	2022	Top Excellence Award, Actor in a Daily/Short Drama	Fanletter Please	Nominated	
MBC Drama Awards	2022	Best Couple Award	Yoon Park (with Choi Soo-young); Fanletter Please	Nominated	
MBC Entertainment Awards	2015	Rookie Award in Music/Talk Show (Male)	Radio Star	Nominated	
SBS Drama Awards	2016	Fantasy Drama Category Male Special Actor Award	Come Back Mister	Nominated	

=== State honors ===
Name of country and organization, year given, and name of honor
Country	Organization	Year	Honor or Award	Ref.
South Korea	Ministry of Justice	2025	Minister of Justice Commendation	
