= Do Sang-woo =

South Korean actor and model

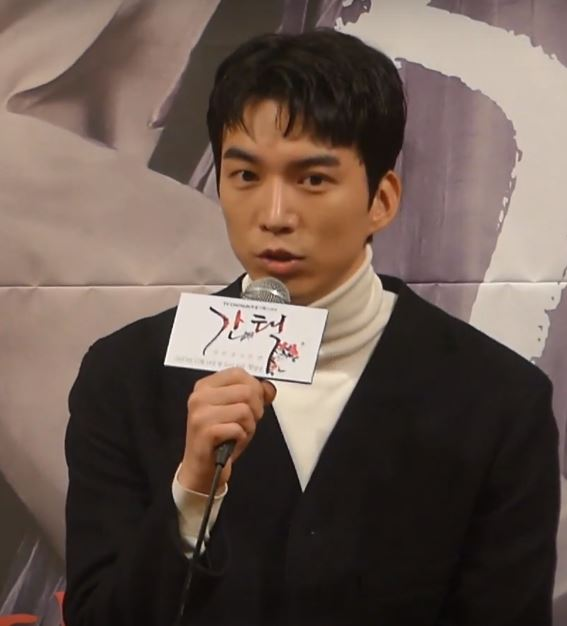
- Do in 2019
- Born: December 25, 1987 (age 38); Busan, South Korea
- Occupations: Actor; model
- Years active: 2008–present
- Agent: J-Wide Company

Korean name
- Hangul: 도상우
- RR: Do Sangu
- MR: To Sangu

Do Sang-woo (born December 25, 1987) is a South Korean actor and model. Do has been gaining attention after starring as Gong Hyo-jin's character's ex-boyfriend in the television series It's Okay, That's Love (2014). He enlisted to the army on April 5, 2016.

== Filmography ==
=== Television series ===
Year	Title	Role	Notes/Ref.
2011	Cool Guys, Hot Ramen	Cha Chi-soo's friend	
2014	It's Okay, That's Love	Choi Ho	
2014	4 Legendary Witches	Ma Do-jin	
2015	Ex-Girlfriends' Club	Jo Gun	
2015	My Daughter, Geum Sa-wol	Joo Se-hoon	
2018	The Smile Has Left Your Eyes	Jang Woo-sung	
2019	Queen: Love and War	Lee Jae-hwa	
2020	Backstreet Rookie	Jo Seung-jun	
2021	The Red Sleeve	Crown Prince Sado	Cameo
2021–2022	The One and Only	Jo Si-young	
2022–2023	Alchemy of Souls	Seo Yoon-oh	Part 2
2023	Oasis	Kim Hyung-joo	

=== Television show ===
Year	Title	Notes/Ref.
2014	Style Log	Host
2015	Law of the Jungle – Hidden Kingdom Special in Brunei	Cast member (ep.171–177)

== Awards and nominations ==
Year	Award	Category	Nominee / Work	Result
2015	10th Asia Model Awards	Fashionista Award	Do Sang-woo	Won
2015	34th MBC Drama Awards	Best New Actor in a Special Project Drama	My Daughter, Geum Sa-wol	Nominated
