= Angry Mom =

2015 South Korean drama series

- Promotional poster for Angry Mom
- Hangul: 앵그리맘
- RR: Aenggeurimam
- MR: Aenggŭrimam
- Genre: Family; Melodrama; Teen
- Created by: Han Hee
- Written by: Kim Ban-di
- Directed by: Choi Byung-gil
- Starring: Kim Hee-sun; Ji Hyun-woo; Kim Yoo-jung
- Composer: Lee Joo-han
- Country of origin: South Korea
- Original language: Korean
- No. of episodes: 16

Production
- Producer: Yoo Hyun-joong
- Production location: Korea
- Cinematography: Lee Jin-seok; Kim Seon-gi
- Editor: Choi Seong-wook
- Running time: 70 minutes

Original release
- Network: MBC TV
- Release: March 18 – May 7, 2015

Angry Mom (Korean: 앵그리맘; RR: Aenggeurimam) is a 2015 South Korean television series starring Kim Hee-sun, Ji Hyun-woo, and Kim Yoo-jung. It aired on MBC from March 18 to May 7, 2015, on Wednesdays and Thursdays at 22:00 (KST) for 16 episodes. The screenplay won the Excellence Award at MBC's 2014 Script Contest.

== Plot ==
The protagonist, Jo Kang-ja (Kim Hee-sun) was once legendary for being the toughest, most feared troublemaker at her high school in Busan. Due to her pregnancy in her late teens, she drops out of school and tries to become a responsible mother to her daughter, Oh Ah-ran (Kim Yoo-jung). Fast-forward to the present, Kang-ja is now 34 years old and Ah-ran is a teenager attending high school. The two have a contentious relationship, with Ah-ran ashamed of Kang-ja's unrefined ajumma manners.

Meanwhile, in Myungsung High School, when Ah-ran befriends the class outcast Jin Yi–kyung, it makes her the target of the school bullies who make her life hell, yet she's too proud to tell her mother what's happening. When Kang-ja finds out that her daughter is getting bullied, she decides to take matters into her own hands. Unbeknownst to Ah-ran, Kang-ja enrolls in Myungsung High as an undercover student with the false name "Jo Bang-wool" to teach those bullies a lesson. But she ends up unraveling the darker problems within the educational system. Kang-ja makes it her mission to put a stop to the school violence, dig up the flaws of the education system, and school corruption at Myungsung High with the help of Ah-ran and the naive, idealistic homeroom teacher Park No-ah.

== Cast ==
=== Main ===
- Kim Hee-sun as Jo Kang-ja / Jo Bang-wool

The protagonist and mother of Oh Ah-ran. She has a dark past of being tried as a murderer (in her late teens) to which she never defended herself. She cares for her daughter greatly despite the fact that Oh Ah-ran despises her a lot. She enrolls in her daughter's high school to find the bullies who made Oh Ah-ran's condition bad enough to be sent to the hospital for treatment, but ends up unraveling the flaws of the education system and the corrupted school background

- Ji Hyun-woo as Park No-ah

An optimistic and naive teacher who is unaware of the politics related to the educational system and sees the world with his innocent eyes. He can do anything and everything possible for his students' well-being as he sees the students as his own children. He is even referred to as the greenhouse plant which has never faced the harsh world by Jo Kang-ja. After the death of Yi-kyung, he changes himself and aids Jo Kang-ja in digging the dark secrets of Myungsung High.

- Kim You-jung as Oh Ah-ran

A bright student. She is the only reason for Jo Kang-ja to move on in her life, hiding her dark past. She is raised as Kang-ja's dead sister's child in the household since she is Kang-ja's child born out of wedlock. After befriending the class outcast, Jin Yi-Kyung, she gets bullied and even threatened for her life, which was enough to make her traumatized and seek medical attention. As the series proceeds, Oh Ah-ran slowly grows closer towards her mom, Jo Kang-ja.

=== Supporting ===
==== People around Jo Kang-ja ====
- Im Hyung-joon as Oh Jin-sang

Husband of Jo Kang-ja. Being a useless husband, he was not agreeable to his wife's antics and task of seeking justice for her daughter by fighting the corrupt school staff and politicians. Despite so, he was quite caring to his family. While staying behind to repair the defective structure of the new school campus, he was killed by the collapse of the building which also killed five students (including Do-hee and Geun-soo).

- Go Soo-hee as Han Gong-joo

A close friend of Kang-ja from high school. She pretends to be Kang-ja's mother when Kang-ja disguises herself as a student named "Jo Bang-wool" and entered Ah-ran's school.

- Kim Ji-young as Kang-ja's mother-in-law

==== People in Class 2-3 ====
- Yoon Ye-joo as Jin Yi-kyung

A friend of Ae-ran, who was a target of bullying in the school. She was secretly being sexually assaulted by Jung-woo a few times, leading her to become pregnant at a young age. She was later murdered by Jung-woo for witnessing evidence of the school's corruption, with her death being covered up as a suicide. Bok-dong witnessed the murder but was forced to take the blame for the "suicide" and it made him feel guilty since.

- Cha Sun-woo as Hong Sang-tae

He is the son of Hong Sang-bok, which makes him the most powerful person in the school as he can even get the teachers that he dislike fired. He fell in love with Oh Ah-ran at first, but he allowed his friends to bully her because she started to become friends with Jin Yi-kyung. However, he himself was not without a painful past, as he was forcibly separated from his mother by his father since young, and his unruly behaviour was not his fault entirely, as it was mostly a product of his father's upbringing. He was also shown to be, in reality, in disagreement with his father's teachings and unethical actions but could not find the courage to object it (though he eventually managed to stand up to his father nearing the finale of the series), and had despised himself for his behaviour. He eventually repented and changed for the better in the later part of the show and confessed his feelings to Ah-ran, who apparently forgiven him and accepted his feelings. He was also happily reunited with his mother nearing the finale of the series.

- Ji Soo as Go Bok-dong

Initially known as the bully at Myungsung High, he was the one to give life threats to Oh Ah-ran and make her traumatized. He has his own reasons to bully and threaten others due to higher orders (since his older brother was in prison). He is forced to take the blame for a heinous crime due to higher orders which makes him feel guilty and finally makes a change in his heart. Things start getting awkward when he falls for Jo Kang-ja and discovers the truth about her. He later became an ally to Kang-ja and maintains his affections to Kang-ja despite their age difference and his initial confusion towards the truth of Kang-ja's identity.

- Park Soo-ah^{1} as Wang Jung-hee

A female delinquent student who bullied Ah-ran but later became a follower of "Jo Bang-wool", who was actually Ah-ran's mother.

- Choi Ye-seul as Na Do-hee

A female delinquent student who was Jung-hee's friend. She later died in an accident that occurred in the school, which also killed four more students and also Kang-ja's husband.

- Seo Ji-hee as Hwang Min-joo

Jung-hee's friend.

- Jung Shin-hye as Hwang Song-yi
- Jang Yoo-sang as Oh Geun-soo

A student of Myungsung High who was also more or less ostracised by the school bullies. When the newly-built school campus collapsed, he was among the five students who died in the collapse, which also claims the life of Kang-ja's husband.

==== People of the Myungsung Foundation ====
- Park Yeong-gyu as Hong Sang-bok

Sang-tae's abusive, greedy, immoral and corrupted father. He drove his wife away from the household and even taught his son to not believe in friendship and love. He was involved in the corruption scandal behind Myungsung High, and was punished with a two-year jail term for the crime (despite the urgings of the prosecution for a heavier jail term). He later bribed his way to freedom by receiving pardon from the South Korean president but was later killed by an unknown person.

- Kim Tae-hoon as Do Jung-woo

A teacher who was the illegitimate son of Kang Soo-chan, a candidate in the upcoming presidential race. He was involved in several crimes and corruption, including repeated sexual assaults of Jin Yi-kyung (which made her pregnant) and murdering Yi-kyung. He was eventually arrested for murder and corruption and sentenced to life imprisonment.

- Park Geun-hyung as Kang Soo-chan

A candidate in the upcoming presidential race and biological father of Jung-woo. He showed no love to his child and even views him and his mother as a thorn in the flesh and obstacle to his political career. His crimes and corruption were brought to light eventually, and he was sentenced to seven years in jail for corruption.

- Oh Yoon-ah as Joo Ae-yeon

A teacher who was attracted to Jung-woo and formerly a schoolmate of Kang-ja. She betrayed Kang-ja (who often stood up for her) and pointed her as the killer of Dong-chil's brother as a result of self-defence, but Kang-ja forgiven her. She betrayed Kang-ja again when she exposed her identity in front of the whole school and reporters. As an accomplice to the school corruption crimes, she herself was sentenced to jail in the end for the charges she faced.

- Kim Hee-won as Ahn Dong-chil

The ruthless elder brother of Kang-ja's deceased boyfriend, and thus Ah-ran's uncle. He participated in the construction project of a new school campus and had also corrupted funds from the project. He hated Kang-ja for killing his brother (she was falsely accused of it) but it was later revealed that Dong-chil himself was the one who killed his brother, though the killing was accidental and Dong-chil still felt guilty over the incident. Initially intending to murder Ah-ran, he grew to care for Ah-ran after discovering she was her biological niece in a shocking twist of events. Later, he assisted Kang-ja to help bring down Hong Sang-bok and even risked his life to escape from jail and rescued Kang-ja from death when Sang-bok abducted her and was about to kill her after his release. He received forgiveness in the end for framing Kang-ja as the murderer of his brother, and sentenced to serve two years in prison. His kindness and concern initially made Ah-ran mistakenly believing that Dong-chil was her biological father until Dong-chil himself admits he was not.

- Kim Byung-choon as Oh Dal-bong

The principal of Myungsung High.

==== Others ====
- Jeon Gook-hwan as Park Jin-ho

No-ah's loving and caring elderly father who was an impartial and fair judge, though he did bribe Myungsung High to employ his son as a teacher. He later played an instrumental role in bringing the teachers of Myungsung High and the politicians involved to justice. He was actually the judge who presided in Kang-ja's murder trial 16 years ago but till this day, he maintains his belief that Kang-ja was not guilty of the crime.

- So Hee-jung as Yi-kyung's mother
- Kang Moon-young as Do Yoon-hee

Jung-woo's mother.

- Kim Seul-ki as Jong-man

One of Gong-joo's two cronies from the underworld.

- Seo Nam-yong as Sang-man

One of Gong-joo's two cronies from the underworld.

- Park Hee-jin as Kim Shin-ja

A teacher in Myungsung High.

- Yoon So-yoon as Teacher Yeo

A teacher in Myungsung High.

- Kim Young-sun as Geun-soo's mother
- Hyun Jin as Han Tae-hee
- Kim Seo-ran as Han Mi-joo
- Kim Young-chul as English teacher (cameo)
- Kang Sung-min as Prosecutor Jang

A prosecutor who knew Jin-ho and was the prosecutor prosecuting the teachers of Myungsung High and the politicians involved in the school's corruption and crimes. He was shown to be a fair and incorruptible prosecutor from his efficient way of handling the trial and his firm argument for the court to mete out heavy penalties for the defendants.

== Original soundtrack ==
=== Part 1 ===
Released on March 25, 2015
No.	Title	Artist	Length
1.	"I Love You, I'm Sorry" (사랑한다 미안해)	Ali	4:30
2.	"I Love You, I'm Sorry" (Inst.)		4:30
Total length:			9:00

=== Part 2 ===
Released on April 1, 2015
No.	Title	Artist	Length
1.	"Angry Mom" (앵그리맘)	Lee Joo Han, Kim Min Hee	1:52
2.	"Sunny Side Up"	Ashbun	2:56
Total length:			4:48

=== Part 3 ===
Released on April 22, 2015
No.	Title	Artist	Length
1.	"Happy Magic"	Lee Joo Han	2:11
Total length:			2:11

=== Part 4 ===
Released on April 29, 2015
No.	Title	Artist	Length
1.	"Happy Magic"	Lee Hyun-woo	3:00
Total length:			3:00

=== Part 5 ===
Released on May 6, 2015
No.	Title	Artist	Length
1.	"Teleport Me"	Aberdeen Orange, Jasmine	4:39
Total length:			4:39

== Ratings ==
Episode #	Original broadcast date	Average audience share			
Episode #	Original broadcast date	TNmS Ratings		AGB Nielsen	
Episode #	Original broadcast date	Nationwide	Seoul National Capital Area	Nationwide	Seoul National Capital Area
1	March 18, 2015	10.1%	13.6%	7.7%	8.7%
2	March 19, 2015	10.6%	14.2%	9.9%	11.0%
3	March 25, 2015	11.4%	14.3%	9.1%	9.9%
4	March 26, 2015	10.9%	14.2%	8.7%	9.5%
5	April 1, 2015	9.8%	12.1%	8.4%	9.6%
6	April 2, 2015	9.3%	11.3%	8.1%	8.8%
7	April 8, 2015	8.5%	9.7%	7.4%	7.6%
8	April 9, 2015	8.3%	10.7%	7.2%	7.7%
9	April 15, 2015	8.4%	10.2%	7.7%	8.2%
10	April 16, 2015	9.2%	12.0%	7.3%	7.8%
11	April 22, 2015	8.0%	10.1%	7.6%	8.4%
12	April 23, 2015	8.0%	9.8%	7.4%	7.7%
13	April 29, 2015	7.0%	8.7%	7.5%	8.5%
14	April 30, 2015	7.8%	9.6%	6.9%	7.3%
15	May 6, 2015	8.7%	10.6%	7.9%	9.0%
16	May 7, 2015	8.8%	11.2%	9.0%	10.6%
Average		9.1%	11.4%	8.0%	8.8%

== Awards and nominations ==
Year	Award	Category	Recipient	Result
2015	4th APAN Star Awards	Top Excellence Award, Actress in a Miniseries	Kim Hee-sun	Won
2015	2015 MBC Dramas Awards	Teen Star Award	Kim Yoo-jung	Won
2015	2015 MBC Dramas Awards	Top 10 Stars	Kim Hee-sun	Won
2015	2015 MBC Dramas Awards	Best Couple	Kim Hee-sun and Ji Soo	Nominated
2015	2015 MBC Dramas Awards	Grand Prize (Daesang)	Kim Hee-sun	Nominated

== Notes ==
- ^{1}Credited as Park Soo-young.
