= Glamorous Temptation =

2015 South Korean television series

- Promotional poster
- Also known as: Fancy Seduction; Brilliant Seduction; Their Fortress
- Genre: Melodrama; Romance; Erotica Drama; Suspense; Revenge
- Written by: Son Young-mok
- Directed by: Kim Sang-hyub
- Starring: Joo Sang-wook; Choi Kang-hee; Cha Ye-ryun; Jung Jin-young
- Composer: Park Se Joon
- Country of origin: South Korea
- Original language: Korean
- No. of episodes: 50

Production
- Executive producers: Lee Chang-yeop; Lee Kang-hoon; Kim Jin-jun
- Producer: Son Young-joon
- Running time: 70 minutes
- Production company: May Queen Pictures

Original release
- Network: MBC TV
- Release: October 5, 2015 – March 22, 2016

Glamorous Temptation (Korean: 화려한 유혹; RR: Hwaryeohan yuhok) is a 2015 South Korean television series starring Joo Sang-wook, Choi Kang-hee, and Cha Ye-ryun. It replaced Splendid Politics and aired on MBC on Mondays and Tuesdays at 22:00 (KST) for 50 episodes from October 5, 2015 to March 22, 2016.

== Plot ==
The series follows three characters: an ambitious woman, a woman jealous of her, and a man who will take revenge.

== Cast ==
=== Main cast ===
- Joo Sang-wook as Jin Hyeong-woo
  - Nam Joo-hyuk as young Jin Hyeong-woo

Hyeong-woo is a man who lives for revenge, as he vows to take revenge against those who drove his father to death when he was still a teenager.

- Choi Kang-hee as Shin Eun-soo
  - Kim Sae-ron as young Shin Eun-soo.

Despite facing a cruel fate where she is framed for crimes she did not commit, and left a widow after her husband dies at a young age, Eun-soo proves to be a strong woman as she strives to be a good single mother to her young daughter.

- Cha Ye-ryun as Kang Il-joo
  - Kim Bo-ra as young Kang Il-joo

Initially known by the name Sang-yi, Il-joo was born to her father's mistress. After her foster mother's death, II-joo is brought under the care of Hyeong-woo's family, who raise her as a close relative. She falls in love with Hyeong-woo, but gets extremely jealous when her close friend Eun-soo and Hyeong-woo fall for each other. She eventually takes matters into her own hands, betraying her friend and later rising up as a presidential candidate.

=== Supporting cast ===
==== Hyeong-woo's Family ====
- Kim Byung-se as Hyeong-woo's father
- Na Young-hee as Hyeong-woo's mother

==== Eun-soo's Family ====
- Jung In-gi as Eun-soo's father
- Kim Mi-kyung as Eun-soo's mother
- Dong Ha as Shin Bum-Soo, Eun-soo's brother
  - Kim Hyung-kyu as young Shin Bum-Soo
- Lee Jae-yoon as Hong Myung-Ho, Eun-soo's husband
- Kal So-won as Hong Mi-Rae, Eun-soo's daughter

==== Il-Joo's Family ====
- Jung Jin-young as Kang Seok-hyun, Il-Joo's father
- Kim Pub-lae as Kang Il-Do, Il-Joo's elder brother
- Park Jung-ah as Lee See-young, Il-Do's wife
- Jang Young-nam as Kang Il-Ran, Il-Joo's elder sister
- Yoon Soo as Kang Yoo-Gyung, Il-Do's daughter

==== Kwon Family ====
- Kim Ho-jin as Kwon Moo-Hyuk, Il-Joo's husband
- Cho Yeon-woo as Kwon Joon-Hyuk, Moo-Hyuk's brother
- Kim Chang-wan as Kwon Soo-Myung, Moo-Hyuk's father

== Awards and nominations ==
Year	Award	Category	Recipient	Result
2015	MBC Drama Awards	Top Excellence Award, Actor in a Special Project Drama	Jung Jin-young	Won
2015	MBC Drama Awards	Top Excellence Award, Actress in a Special Project Drama	Choi Kang-hee	Nominated
2015	MBC Drama Awards	Excellence Award, Actor in a Special Project Drama	Joo Sang-wook	Nominated
2015	MBC Drama Awards	Best Supporting Actor in a Special Project Drama	Kim Ho-jin	Won
2015	MBC Drama Awards	Best Supporting Actress in a Special Project Drama	Jang Young-nam	Nominated
2015	MBC Drama Awards	Best Supporting Actress in a Special Project Drama	Na Young-hee	Nominated
2015	MBC Drama Awards	Best Young Actress	Kal So-won	Won
