= Fanletter, Please! =

2022 South Korean television series

- Promotional poster
- Hangul: 팬레터를 보내주세요
- Lit.: Please Send a Fan Letter
- RR: Paelleteoreul bonae juseyo
- MR: P'aellet'ŏrŭl ponae chuseyo
- Genre: Romantic comedy
- Written by: Park Tae-yang
- Directed by: Jeong Sang-hee
- Starring: Choi Soo-young; Yoon Park; Shin Yeon-woo
- Country of origin: South Korea
- Original language: Korean
- No. of episodes: 4

Production
- Producers: Shin Dong-cheol; Kang Jae-hyun; Jeon Hye-joon
- Production company: Ascendio

Original release
- Network: MBC TV
- Release: November 18 – November 26, 2022

Fanletter Please (Korean: 팬레터를 보내주세요) is a South Korean television series starring Choi Soo-young, Yoon Park, and Shin Yeon-woo. It aired on MBC TV from November 18 to 26, 2022, every Friday and Saturday at 21:50 (KST) for four episodes.

== Synopsis ==
Fanletter Please tells the story of Han Kang-hee (Choi Soo-young), a top celebrity in South Korea, who faces her biggest crisis after accidentally receiving a fake fan letter sent by Bang Jeong-seok (Yoon Park) to his sick daughter in order to fulfill her wishes of getting a reply from her idol. It turns out that Bang Jeong-seok and Han Kang-hee were high school classmates in their senior year, till a misunderstanding on Kang-hee's part separated them.

== Cast ==
=== Main ===
- Choi Soo-young as Han Kang-hee

A top celebrity.

- Yoon Park as Bang Jeong-seok

An unmarried man who raises his sick daughter alone.

- Shin Yeon-woo as Bang Yu-na

Jeong-seok's daughter.

=== Supporting ===
- Kang Da-hyun as Koo Hye-ri

Friend of Han Kang-hee during their medical school days.

- Kim Sang-woo as Hoon

Manager of Han Kang-hee.

- Jung In-ji as Yoon Ah-young

Representative of the agency of Korean star Han Kang-hee.

- Jung Jae-sung as Son Hyuk-soo

Entertainment reporter.

- Choi Ha-yoon as Oh Yeon-hee

High school classmate of Han Kang-hee.

- Kwon Hyuk as Actor

He is an actor and male lead in the drama Starlight Couple is a top star.

== Ratings ==
Average TV viewership ratings (nationwide)
Ep.	Original broadcast date	Average audience share (Nielsen Korea)
1	November 18, 2022	2.0% (33rd)
2	November 19, 2022	1.3% (47th)
3	November 25, 2022	1.5% (39th)
4	November 26, 2022	0.9% (67th)
Average		1.43%
In the table above, the blue numbers represent the lowest ratings and the red numbers represent the highest ratings.
