= Do Woo =

South Korean actor (born 1996)

- Born: Han Jong-young; September 23, 1996 (age 29); South Korea
- Education: Korea National University of Arts
- Occupation: Actor
- Years active: 2014–present
- Agent: Vast Entertainment
- Height: 182 cm (6 ft 0 in)

Korean name
- Hangul: 한종영
- RR: Han Jongyeong
- MR: Han Chongyŏng

Stage name
- Hangul: 도우
- Hanja: 燾宇
- RR: Do U
- MR: To U

Han Jong-young (Korean: 한종영; born September 23, 1996), known professionally as Do Woo (도우) is a South Korean actor. He is best known for his roles in the television dramas Make a Woman Cry (2015), Our Gap-soon (2016–2017), Unintentional Love Story (2023), and Chief Detective 1958 (2024).

== Filmography ==
=== Film ===
Year	Title	Role	Notes	Ref.
2024	The Time of Fever	Kim Dong-hee	First lead role; Unintentional Love Story spin-off film	

=== Television series ===
Year	Title	Role	Notes	Ref.
2014–2015	Righteous Love	Choi Duk-bae		
2015	Make a Woman Cry	Kang Yoon-seo		
2016	Moorim School: Saga of the Brave	Dong Goo		
2016–2017	Our Gap-soon	Choi Ha-soo		
2022	Dear.M	Choi Tae-jin		
2023	Unintentional Love Story	Kim Dong-hee		
2024	Chief Detective 1958	Nam Sung-hoon		
