= Make a Woman Cry =

2015 South Korean television series

- Promotional poster
- Also known as: Don't Make Her Cry; Make Women Cry; Let the Woman Cry; Let the Girl Cry
- Genre: Romance; Family; Melodrama
- Written by: Ha Chung-ok
- Directed by: Kim Geun-hong; Park Sang-hoon
- Starring: Kim Jung-eun; Song Chang-ui
- Composers: Kim Jun-seok; Jang Se-rin
- Country of origin: South Korea
- Original language: Korean
- No. of episodes: 40

Production
- Executive producer: Noh Do-chul
- Producer: Kim Ho-joon
- Cinematography: Song In-hyuk
- Editor: Choi Sung-wook
- Running time: 70 minutes

Original release
- Network: Munhwa Broadcasting Corporation
- Release: April 18 – August 30, 2015

Make a Woman Cry (Korean: 여자를 울려; RR: Yeojareul ullyeo) is a 2015 South Korean television series starring Kim Jung-eun and Song Chang-eui. It aired on MBC on Saturdays and Sundays at 20:45 for 40 episodes beginning April 18, 2015.

== Plot ==
Jung Deok-in was once a homicide detective, but she quit her job after the death of her only son. To preserve his memory, she now runs a food stall in front of her son's school, where she also tries to protect the neighborhood children and her student customers from bullying and other dangers. As Deok-in goes on a journey to discover the truth behind her son's death, she must go through a staggering process of healing and forgiveness.

== Cast ==
- Kim Jung-eun as Jung Deok-in
- Song Chang-eui as Kang Jin-woo
- Ha Hee-ra as Na Eun-soo
- Oh Dae-gyu as Kang Jin-myung
- Lee Tae-ran as Choi Hong-ran
- In Gyo-jin as Hwang Kyung-chul
- Lee Soon-jae as Kang Tae-hwan
- Han Do-woo as Kang Yoon-seo
- Shin Ji-woon as Kang Min-seo
- Park Sang-hyun as Kang Hyun-seo
- Han Yi-seo as Kang Jin-hee
- Seo Woo-rim as Min Jung-sook
- Han Bo-bae as Hwang Kyung-ah
- Ji Il-joo as Hwang Kyung-tae
- Jin Seon-kyu as Hwang Kyung-soo
- Kim Ji-young as Bok-rye
- Lee Da-in as Park Hyo-jung
- Park Cheon-guk as Park Ho Shik
- Kim Hae-sook as Park Hwa-soon (cameo)
- Kim Jin-seong

== Ratings ==
- In this table, The blue numbers represent the lowest ratings and the red numbers represent the highest ratings.

| Ep. | Original broadcast date | Average audience share | | | |
| Ep. | Original broadcast date | TNmS Ratings | | AGB Nielsen | |
| Ep. | Original broadcast date | Nationwide | Seoul National Capital Area | Nationwide | Seoul National Capital Area |
|---|---|---|---|---|---|
| 1 | April 18, 2015 | 15.3% (2nd) | 16.2% (3rd) | 15.0% (2nd) | 16.1% (2nd) |
| 2 | April 19, 2015 | 17.9% (2nd) | 19.5% (2nd) | 18.4% (2nd) | 18.7% (2nd) |
| 3 | April 25, 2015 | 15.1% (2nd) | 15.8% (2nd) | 14.5% (2nd) | 15.6% (2nd) |
| 4 | April 26, 2015 | 17.9% (2nd) | 19.8% (2nd) | 17.7% (2nd) | 18.8% (2nd) |
| 5 | May 2, 2015 | 15.8% (2nd) | 18.2% (2nd) | 14.8% (2nd) | 15.4% (2nd) |
| 6 | May 3, 2015 | 17.1% (2nd) | 18.5% (2nd) | 18.2% (2nd) | 19.5% (2nd) |
| 7 | May 9, 2015 | 17.0% (2nd) | 18.9% (2nd) | 15.3% (2nd) | 16.3% (2nd) |
| 8 | May 10, 2015 | 17.4% (2nd) | 18.6% (2nd) | 17.4% (2nd) | 18.7% (2nd) |
| 9 | May 16, 2015 | 14.9% (2nd) | 16.3% (2nd) | 15.0% (2nd) | 16.0% (2nd) |
| 10 | May 17, 2015 | 17.7% (2nd) | 19.7% (2nd) | 18.2% (2nd) | 19.3% (2nd) |
| 11 | May 23, 2015 | 15.3% (2nd) | 16.6% (2nd) | 14.6% (2nd) | 15.6% (2nd) |
| 12 | May 24, 2015 | 18.7% (2nd) | 19.9% (2nd) | 17.2% (2nd) | 17.9% (2nd) |
| 13 | May 30, 2015 | 16.1% (2nd) | 16.6% (2nd) | 15.8% (2nd) | 16.4% (2nd) |
| 14 | May 31, 2015 | 19.5% (2nd) | 21.8% (2nd) | 18.7% (2nd) | 20.2% (2nd) |
| 15 | June 6, 2015 | 15.5% (2nd) | 17.1% (3rd) | 16.6% (2nd) | 16.6% (2nd) |
| 16 | June 7, 2015 | 18.9% (2nd) | 20.3% (2nd) | 20.2% (2nd) | 21.3% (2nd) |
| 17 | June 13, 2015 | 16.1% (2nd) | 18.3% (2nd) | 16.8% (2nd) | 18.6% (2nd) |
| 18 | June 14, 2015 | 19.9% (2nd) | 22.4% (2nd) | 20.3% (2nd) | 21.6% (2nd) |
| 19 | June 20, 2015 | 17.2% (2nd) | 18.1% (2nd) | 17.7% (2nd) | 18.9% (2nd) |
| 20 | June 21, 2015 | 20.3% (2nd) | 20.6% (2nd) | 20.9% (2nd) | 21.8% (2nd) |
| 21 | June 27, 2015 | 18.3% (2nd) | 20.1% (2nd) | 17.9% (2nd) | 19.0% (2nd) |
| 22 | June 28, 2015 | 20.1% (2nd) | 21.8% (2nd) | 20.4% (2nd) | 21.7% (2nd) |
| 23 | July 4, 2015 | 18.9% (2nd) | 20.4% (2nd) | 18.8% (2nd) | 19.0% (2nd) |
| 24 | July 5, 2015 | 19.9% (2nd) | 22.3% (2nd) | 21.0% (2nd) | 22.0% (2nd) |
| 25 | July 11, 2015 | 18.9% (2nd) | 21.0% (2nd) | 18.7% (2nd) | 19.2% (2nd) |
| 26 | July 12, 2015 | 21.1% (2nd) | 22.7% (2nd) | 23.0% (2nd) | 23.8% (2nd) |
| 27 | July 18, 2015 | 19.8% (2nd) | 21.3% (2nd) | 19.6% (2nd) | 20.2% (2nd) |
| 28 | July 19, 2015 | 21.2% (2nd) | 22.6% (2nd) | 21.8% (2nd) | 22.5% (2nd) |
| 29 | July 25, 2015 | 19.8% (2nd) | 21.8% (2nd) | 19.0% (2nd) | 19.9% (2nd) |
| 30 | July 26, 2015 | 20.4% (2nd) | 22.4% (2nd) | 22.1% (2nd) | 21.7% (2nd) |
| 31 | August 1, 2015 | 18.4% (2nd) | 20.5% (2nd) | 19.3% (2nd) | 20.3% (2nd) |
| 32 | August 2, 2015 | 21.2% (2nd) | 22.5% (2nd) | 22.7% (2nd) | 23.5% (2nd) |
| 33 | August 8, 2015 | 18.3% (2nd) | 19.1% (2nd) | 18.8% (2nd) | 19.5% (2nd) |
| 34 | August 9, 2015 | 21.3% (2nd) | 21.9% (2nd) | 24.2% (2nd) | 25.3% (2nd) |
| 35 | August 15, 2015 | 17.7% (1st) | 19.5% (1st) | 19.5% (1st) | 20.6% (1st) |
| 36 | August 16, 2015 | 24.0% (2nd) | 25.1% (2nd) | 24.1% (2nd) | 24.6% (2nd) |
| 37 | August 22, 2015 | 18.1% (2nd) | 18.9% (2nd) | 19.3% (2nd) | 20.3% (2nd) |
| 38 | August 23, 2015 | 21.9% (1st) | 23.7% (1st) | 22.8% (1st) | 23.6% (1st) |
| 39 | August 29, 2015 | 21.4% (1st) | 23.1% (1st) | 21.3% (1st) | 22.0% (1st) |
| 40 | August 30, 2015 | 23.7% (1st) | 25.2% (1st) | 25.5% (1st) | 26.7% (1st) |
| Average | | 18.7% | 20.2% | 19.1% | 20.0% |

== Awards and nominations ==
| Year | Award | Category | Recipient | Result |
|---|---|---|---|---|
| 2015 | 4th APAN Star Awards | Top Excellence Award, Actress in a Serial Drama | Kim Jung-eun | Nominated |
| 2015 | 4th APAN Star Awards | Excellence Award, Actor in a Serial Drama | Song Chang-eui | Nominated |
| 2015 | 34th MBC Drama Awards | Grand Prize (Daesang) | Kim Jung-eun | Nominated |
| 2015 | 34th MBC Drama Awards | Drama of the Year | Make a Woman Cry | Nominated |
| 2015 | 34th MBC Drama Awards | Top Excellence Award, Actor in a Serial Drama | Song Chang-eui | Won |
| 2015 | 34th MBC Drama Awards | Top Excellence Award, Actress in a Serial Drama | Kim Jung-eun | Won |
| 2015 | 34th MBC Drama Awards | Excellence Award, Actor in a Serial Drama | Oh Dae-gyu | Nominated |
| 2015 | 34th MBC Drama Awards | Excellence Award, Actress in a Serial Drama | Ha Hee-ra | Nominated |
| 2015 | 34th MBC Drama Awards | Best Supporting Actor in a Serial Drama | In Gyo-jin | Nominated |
| 2015 | 34th MBC Drama Awards | Best Supporting Actress in a Serial Drama | Kim Ji-young | Nominated |
| 2015 | 34th MBC Drama Awards | Writer of the Year | Ha Chung-ok | Won |

== International broadcast ==
- It aired in Vietnam from October 14, 2016, on TV Star - SCTV11, under the name Đừng làm em khóc.
