= The Doctors (South Korean TV series) =

2016 South Korean television series

- Promotional poster
- Also known as: Doctor Crush
- Hangul: 닥터스
- Lit.: Doctors
- RR: Dakteoseu
- MR: Takt'ŏsŭ
- Genre: Medical; Drama; Romance
- Written by: Ha Myung-hee
- Directed by: Oh Chung-hwan
- Starring: Kim Rae-won; Park Shin-hye; Yoon Kyun-sang; Lee Sung-kyung
- Country of origin: South Korea
- Original language: Korean
- No. of episodes: 20

Production
- Executive producers: Han Jung-hwan; Kim Hee-yeol
- Producer: Kim Jung-mi
- Running time: 60 minutes
- Production company: Pan Entertainment
- Budget: ₩5.1 billion

Original release
- Network: SBS TV
- Release: June 20 – August 23, 2016

Related
- Kalp Atışı (2017–2018)

The Doctors (Korean: 닥터스) is a 2016 South Korean medical drama starring Kim Rae-won and Park Shin-hye. It aired on SBS TV from June 20 to August 23, 2016, every Monday and Tuesday at 22:00 (KST) for 20 episodes.

The drama was a hit and averaged 18.40% in audience ratings. In particular, Park's character as a troubled teenager turned charismatic doctor was very popular among the audiences for her action scenes and straightforward lines.

== Synopsis ==
Yoo Hye-jung (Park Shin-hye) was a headstrong girl in high school with a prickly, gangster personality. Due to her many childhood scars, Hye-jung keeps her heart closed towards other people. However, she changes after meeting her mentor Hong Ji-hong (Kim Rae-won), who plays a key role in transforming her life from a "hopeless" delinquent to a compassionate doctor. They part ways due to a report of their close relationship, which was reported by a fellow student but subsequently meet again after 13 years, when Yoo Hye-jung had become a successful doctor.

== Cast ==
=== Main ===
- Kim Rae-won as Hong Ji-hong
  - Gil Jung-woo as child Hong Ji-hong
  - Lomon as teen Hong Ji-hong

Hong Ji-hong, whose birth name was Lee Ji-hong before his adoption, is a hard working man who lost his parents at a young age in a car accident. He was adopted later on in his life, graduated from a prestigious medical school and started out as a doctor. However, a medical accident while he was working as a surgeon made him step back and he restarts his career as a biology teacher. He cares for teenagers, especially his students since he had a rough life as a teenager. This makes him interested in the life of rebellious Yoo Hye-jung when she decides to turn over a new leaf and actually work hard in school. It is after being separated from her that he realizes she is the one he has fallen in love with. When he and Yoo Hye-jung cross paths 13 years later, he who is now a neurosurgeon confesses his feelings for her.

- Park Shin-hye as Yoo Hye-jung
  - Kal So-won as child Yoo Hye-jung

Yoo Hye-jung is a successful neurosurgeon. She was a delinquent in high school, known for her wayward personality. Having gone through a tough childhood, she found it hard to trust anyone. The only person she trusted and loved is her grandmother, who never failed to support her. However, her thoughts about others changed after meeting teacher Hong Ji-hong, who helped her find her goal in life.

- Yoon Kyun-sang as Jung Yoon-do

Jung Yoon-do is a neurosurgeon as well as a visiting staff who is from a wealthy family. He is not good with rough situations in society. However, he knows how to handle his work with strictness. He finds himself attracted to Yoo Hye-jung, who is very different from him.

- Lee Sung-kyung as Jin Seo-woo

Jin Seo-woo is a neurosurgeon and also friends-turned-enemies with Yoo Hye-jung. She liked Hong Ji-Hong, but seeing the growing relationship between Hong Ji-hong and Yoo Hye-jung, she causes trouble for them. This in turn caused them to part ways. Forgetting about Hong, she starts liking Jung Yoon-do but again feels inferior to Hye Jung due to Yoon-do's attraction towards Hye-jung. Eventually, she reconciled with Hye-jung and restored their friendship. Additionally, in the end, she fell for Young-gook and became his girlfriend.

=== Supporting ===
==== People around Hong Ji-hong ====
- Lee Ho-jae as Hong Doo-sik – Ji-hong's adoptive father and Gookil Hospital's chairman.
- Yoo Da-in as Jo In-joo – General Surgery's specialist.

==== People around Yoo Hye-jung ====
- Kim Young-ae as Kang Mal-soon (cameo) – Hye-jung's grandmother.
- Jung Hae-kyun as Yoo Min-ho – Hye-jung and Yoo-na's biological father.
- Park Ji-a as Lee Ga-jin – Hye-jung's stepmother and Yoo-na's mother.
- Han Bo-bae as Yoo Yoo-na – Hye-jung's younger half-sister.
- Ji Soo as Kim Soo-cheol (Guest: Ep. 1, 2, 3, 5, 7–8) – Hye-jung's friend.
- Moon Ji-in as Cheon Soon-hee – Hye-jung's best friend and Seo-woo's friend.

==== People around Jin Seo-woo ====
- Jeon Gook-hwan as Jin Sung-jong – Seo-woo's grandfather and Gookil Hospital's vice president.
- Um Hyo-sup as Jin Myung-hoon – Seo-woo's father and Gookil Hospital's director.
- Yoon Hae-young as Yoon Ji-young – Seo-woo's mother.

==== People of Gookil Hospital ====
- Jang Hyun-sung as Kim Tae-ho – Gookil Hospital's deputy director and Head of Neurosurgery
- Kim Kang-hyun as Kang Kyung-joon – Neurosurgery's 4th year resident doctor.
- Baek Sung-hyun as Pi Young-gook – Neurosurgery's 3rd year resident doctor and Seo-woo's friend who had a long-time crush on her.
- Jo Hyun-sik as Ahn Joong-dae – Neurosurgery's 2nd year resident doctor.
- Kim Min-seok as Choi Kang-soo – Neurosurgery's 1st year resident doctor.
- Jung Jin as Baek Ho-min – Head of General Surgery and Hospital's public relations chief.
- Lee Seon-ho as Jung Pa-ran – General Surgery's teacher, Ji-hong's friend and Yoon-do's uncle.
- Choi Sung-jae as Hwangbo Tae-yang – General Surgery's 1st year resident doctor.
- Pyo Ye-jin as Hyun Soo-jin – 5th year nurse.
- Ji Yi-soo as Yoo Byul – 2nd year nurse.

=== Extended ===
- Park Young-soo as Namyang Girls' High School's teacher
- Nam Moon-cheol as Cheon Soon-hee's father, Namyang Girls' High School's director
- Kim Dae-sung as club DJ
- Gong Da-im as Choi Mi-ra
- Kim Min-cheol as Kim Soo-cheol's friend
- Lee Jin-kwon as Kim Soo-cheol's friend
- Lee Bom-so-ri as So-ri
- Son Jang-woo as pregnant patient's son
- Jeon Ji-an as patient passenger on airplane
- Im Ji-kyu as gunman
- Jin Seon-kyu as Kim Chi-hyun
- Go Woo-rim as Nam Hae
- Choi Jeong-hoo as Nam Dal
- Jung Dong-gyu as parliamentarian Na Min-soo
- Yeo Hoe-hyun as Choi Young-soo (Kang soo's younger brother) (Episodes 17–18)
- Hong Seung-beom as lawyer

=== Special appearances ===
- Lee Ki-woo as Gong Byung-doo – gang boss (Episodes 1, 3–6, 9)
- Lee Jun-hyeok as boss's subordinate
- Jung Kyung-soon as Oh Young-mi
- Lim Ji-yeon as Lee Soo-jeong – youngest gold medalist in archery (Episode 7–8)
- Han Hye-jin as Jo Soo-ji (Episodes 11–12)
- Jo Dal-hwan as Ahn Sung-soo – Jo Soo-ji's stalker/assailant (Episodes 11–12)
- Namkoong Min as Nam Ba-ram – Nam Hae and Nam Dal's father (Episodes 13–15)
- Lee Sang-yeob as Kim Woo-jin – Lee Hee-young's fiancé (Episodes 15, 16, 18, 20)

== Production ==
The Doctors was based on the screenplay by Ha Myung-hee which is one of the winners in Broadcasting Content Promotion Foundation (BCPF)'s 3rd Find the Desert's Shooting Star Screenplay Competition, held in 2010. Then titled as Female Thug Hye-jung (여깡패 혜정; Yeokkangpae Hyejeong), the series was in talks to air on KBS 2TV's Monday-Tuesday prime time slot in 2015 following the end of Healer, however, it did not push through. HB Entertainment (My Love from the Star, You're All Surrounded) was supposed to produce the drama, while PD Mo Wan-il (Smile Again, Dream High 2) was in talks to direct.

First script reading took place on April 28, 2016, at SBS Ilsan Production Studios in Goyang, Gyeonggi Province, South Korea.

The series reunited Park Shin-hye and Baek Sung-hyun, who previously played the younger versions of Han Jung-suh and Cha Song-joo, respectively, in the 2003 hit drama, Stairway to Heaven. It also reunited Park Shin-hye and Yoon Kyun-sang who previously worked together in the 2014 hit drama, Pinocchio.

In the United States, the drama was aired in the Los Angeles DMA free, over-the-air on Asian American-oriented TV channel, LA 18 KSCI-TV (channel 18) with English subtitles, Monday through Tuesday at 9:00pm, from July 18 to September 20, 2016.

== Original soundtrack ==
Doctors OST

Soundtrack album by Various Artists
- Released: August 1, 2016
- Genres: Soundtrack, Pop
- Languages: Korean, English
- Labels: Pan Entertainment, RIAK

=== Track listings ===
No.	Title	Artist	Length
1.	"No Way"	Park Yong-in & Kwon Soon-il (Urban Zakapa)	3:44
2.	"Sunflower"	Younha ft. Kassy	3:30
3.	"That Love (그 애)"	Jungyup (Brown Eyed Soul)	3:42
4.	"You're Pretty (넌 예뻐)"	Jungho (2MUCH)	3:11
5.	"Sun Shower (여우비)"	Se O (Jelly Cookie)	4:40
6.	"No Way (Inst.)"		3:44
7.	"Sunflower (Inst.)"		3:30
8.	"That Love (그 애) (Inst.)"		3:42
9.	"You're Pretty (넌 예뻐) (Inst.)"		3:43
10.	"Sun Shower (여우비) (Inst.)"		4:40
11.	"School"	Various Artist	2:34
12.	"From Me to You"	Various Artist	2:55
13.	"Beautiful Lies"	Various Artist	2:09
14.	"Chromatic Surgery"	Various Artist	4:08
15.	"Doctor's Memory"	Various Artist	1:52
16.	"Healing Heart"	Various Artist	2:20
17.	"Into the Time"	Various Artist	2:20
18.	"Table Death"	Various Artist	2:06
19.	"Pitter-Patter"	Various Artist	1:36
20.	"Awake Surgery"	Various Artist	2:48
21.	"Hurt and Heart"	Various Artist	2:10
22.	"Sad Gold Spoon"	Various Artist	2:48
23.	"Good-bye My Fellow"	Various Artist	3:00
24.	"Code Blue"	Various Artist	2:45
25.	"Doctors in Love"	Various Artist	1:45

=== Charted songs ===
Chart performance

Title	Year	Peak chart positions	Sales	Remarks
Title	Year	Gaon	Sales	Remarks
"No Way" (Park Yong In, Kwon Soon Il (Urban Zakapa))	2016	24	KOR (DL): 212,642+	Part 1
"Sunflower" (Younha ft. Kassy)	2016	72	KOR (DL): 159,597+	Part 2
"It's Love" (Jung Yup (Brown Eyed Soul))	2016	36	KOR (DL): 179,405+	Part 3

== Ratings ==
Ep.	Broadcast date	Average audience share			
Ep.	Broadcast date	TNmS		AGB Nielsen	
Ep.	Broadcast date	Nationwide	Seoul	Nationwide	Seoul
1	June 20, 2016	11.4% (4th)	15.1% (4th)	12.9% (4th)	14.7% (4th)
2	June 21, 2016	12.4% (4th)	16.9% (3rd)	14.2% (4th)	16.2% (4th)
3	June 27, 2016	12.8% (4th)	16.5% (3rd)	14.4% (3rd)	16.9% (3rd)
4	June 28, 2016	14.6% (3rd)	17.8% (2nd)	15.6% (3rd)	18.0% (2nd)
5	July 4, 2016	16.1% (3rd)	20.7% (1st)	18.4% (3rd)	20.2% (3rd)
6	July 5, 2016	16.8% (3rd)	20.8% (1st)	19.7% (3rd)	21.6% (2nd)
7	July 11, 2016	18.4% (3rd)	22.3% (1st)	18.8% (3rd)	21.3% (2nd)
8	July 12, 2016	17.8% (3rd)	20.3% (2nd)	19.2% (2nd)	21.1% (2nd)
9	July 18, 2016	16.8% (3rd)	20.0% (2nd)	19.4% (3rd)	21.5% (2nd)
10	July 19, 2016	17.2% (4th)	19.9% (2nd)	19.3% (2nd)	22.6% (2nd)
11	July 25, 2016	17.2% (3rd)	20.2% (1st)	19.2% (3rd)	21.9% (2nd)
12	July 26, 2016	18.2% (3rd)	20.9% (1st)	18.7% (3rd)	21.7% (2nd)
13	August 1, 2016	17.6% (4th)	20.6% (1st)	18.5% (3rd)	20.8% (1st)
14	August 2, 2016	17.2% (3rd)	21.2% (1st)	19.6% (2nd)	21.8% (1st)
15	August 8, 2016	20.0% (3rd)	23.3% (1st)	21.3% (2nd)	23.1% (1st)
16	August 9, 2016	18.4% (2nd)	21.4% (1st)	20.6% (2nd)	22.4% (1st)
17	August 15, 2016	20.6% (2nd)	23.8% (1st)	20.8% (2nd)	22.8% (1st)
18	August 22, 2016 (Note: Episode 18 wasn't aired on August 16, 2016 due to the broadcast of 2016 Summer Olympics in Rio de Janeiro, Brazil. The episode was aired on August 22, 2016 instead.)	16.2% (4th)	19.7% (2nd)	17.8% (4th)	19.6% (4th)
19	August 22, 2016	16.1% (5th)	19.5% (3rd)	19.5% (3rd)	22.0% (2nd)
20	August 23, 2016	17.9% (3rd)	21.2% (1st)	20.2% (2nd)	22.0% (1st)
Average		16.69%	20.11%	18.41%	20.61%
In this table, the blue numbers represent the lowest ratings and the red numbers represent the highest ratings.

== Awards and nominations ==
Year	Award	Category	Recipient	Result	Ref.
2016	5th APAN Star Awards	Grand Prize (Daesang)	Kim Rae-won	Nominated	
2016	5th APAN Star Awards	Grand Prize (Daesang)	Park Shin-hye	Nominated	
2016	5th APAN Star Awards	Top Excellence Award, Actor in a Miniseries	Kim Rae-won	Nominated	
2016	5th APAN Star Awards	Top Excellence Award, Actress in a Miniseries	Park Shin-hye	Nominated	
2016	5th APAN Star Awards	Best New Actor	Yoon Kyun-sang	Won	
2016	5th APAN Star Awards	Best Couple Award	Kim Rae-won and Park Shin-hye	Nominated	
2016	9th Korea Drama Awards	Grand Prize (Daesang)	Kim Rae-won	Nominated	
2016	9th Korea Drama Awards	Best Drama	The Doctors	Nominated	
2016	9th Korea Drama Awards	Top Excellence Award, Actor	Jang Hyun-sung	Won	
2016	9th Korea Drama Awards	Top Excellence Award, Actress	Park Shin-hye	Nominated	
2016	1st Asia Artist Awards	Best Artist Award, Actor	Kim Rae-won	Nominated	
2016	1st Asia Artist Awards	Best Artist Award, Actress	Park Shin-hye	Won	
2016	24th SBS Drama Awards	Grand Prize (Daesang)	Park Shin-hye	Nominated	
2016	24th SBS Drama Awards	Top Excellence Award, Actor in a Genre & Fantasy Drama	Kim Rae-won	Won	
2016	24th SBS Drama Awards	Top Excellence Award, Actress in a Genre & Fantasy Drama	Park Shin-hye	Won	
2016	24th SBS Drama Awards	Excellence Award, Actor in a Genre Drama	Yoon Kyun-sang	Nominated	
2016	24th SBS Drama Awards	Special Award, Actor in a Genre Drama	Jang Hyun-sung	Nominated	
2016	24th SBS Drama Awards	Special Award, Actress in a Genre Drama	Lee Sung-kyung	Nominated	
2016	24th SBS Drama Awards	Special Award, Actress in a Genre Drama	Moon Ji-in	Nominated	
2016	24th SBS Drama Awards	Top 10 Stars Award	Park Shin-hye	Won	
2016	24th SBS Drama Awards	New Star Award	Kim Min-seok	Won	
2016	24th SBS Drama Awards	New Star Award	Moon Ji-in	Won	
2016	24th SBS Drama Awards	Best Couple Award	Kim Rae-won and Park Shin-hye	Nominated	
2016	24th SBS Drama Awards	Idol Academy Award – Best Kiss	Kim Rae-won and Park Shin-hye	Nominated	
2017	53rd Baeksang Arts Awards	Best Actress	Park Shin-hye	Nominated	
2017	53rd Baeksang Arts Awards	Best New Actor	Kim Min-seok	Won	
2017	Seoul International Drama Awards	Outstanding Korean Drama	The Doctors	Won	

== Remake ==
In 2017, Kalp Atışı ("Heart beat") an adaptation of the series, was made by the Turkish network Show TV. It aired for 1 season.
