= Love+Sling =

- Theatrical Poster
- Hangul: 레슬러
- Lit.: Wrestler
- RR: Reseulleo
- MR: Resŭllŏ
- Directed by: Kim Dae-woong
- Screenplay by: Kim Dae-woong
- Produced by: Lee Ahn-na
- Starring: Yoo Hae-jin; Kim Min-jae; Lee Sung-kyung
- Cinematography: Kang Jong-soo
- Edited by: Kim Man-geun; Kim Yoon-ae
- Music by: Dalpalan; Han Hee-jung
- Production company: Annapurna Films
- Distributed by: Lotte Entertainment
- Release date: May 9, 2018
- Running time: 110 minutes
- Country: South Korea
- Language: Korean
- Box office: US$5.8 million

Love+Sling (also known as Wrestler) is a 2018 South Korean comedy drama film directed by Kim Dae-woong. It stars Yoo Hae-jin, Kim Min-jae, and Lee Sung-kyung. The film was released in South Korea on May 9, 2018.

== Plot ==
Sung-woong devotes his life to become a national-level wrestler even though wrestling doesn't interest him one bit. But his father, Gui-bo sacrifices everything for his son's "dream". One day, Sung-woong's life is turned upside down when the girl he has a crush on confesses that she has feelings for his father instead, and thus they begin wrestling for love.

== Cast ==
- Yoo Hae-jin as Gui-bo
- Kim Min-jae as Sung-woong
- Lee Sung-kyung as Ga-young
- Na Moon-hee as Gui-bo's mother
- Sung Dong-il as Sung-soo
- Jin Kyung as Mi-ra
- Hwang Woo-seul-hye as Do-na
- Kim Tae-hoon as Seung-hyuk
- Park Gyu-young as So-young
- Lee Ji-ha as Homeroom Teacher
- Lee Soo-mi as Butcher
- Kim Kang-hyun as Dol-sing

== Production ==
Filming began on July 19, 2017 and finished October 17, 2017.

== Reception ==
The film opened at 897 local theaters, attracting 63,000 moviegoers on its opening day and finishing second behind Avengers: Infinity War. The film finished second during its first weekend with US$2.9 million gross. However, the film suffered an 80% drop on its second weekend, and a 95% drop on its third weekend. As of August 20, 2018, the film attracted 771,141 audiences with US$5.8 million gross.
