= Miss & Mrs. Cops =

South Korean crime comedy film

- Theatrical release poster
- Hangul: 걸캅스
- Lit.: Girl Cops
- RR: Geol kapseu
- MR: Kŏl k'apsŭ
- Directed by: Jung Da-won
- Screenplay by: Jung Da-won
- Produced by: Byun Bong-hyun
- Starring: Ra Mi-ran; Lee Sung-kyung
- Cinematography: Lee Seong-jae
- Edited by: Kim Hyung-ju
- Music by: Lee Jae-hak
- Production company: Film Momentum
- Distributed by: CJ Entertainment
- Release date: May 9, 2019
- Running time: 107 minutes
- Country: South Korea
- Language: Korean
- Box office: US$12.1 million

Miss & Mrs. Cops (Korean: 걸캅스; RR: Geol kapseu; lit. 'Girl Cops') is a 2019 South Korean buddy cop action comedy film starring Ra Mi-ran and Lee Sung-kyung. It was released on May 9, 2019.

The original title Girl Cops is a homage to the South Korean television series Two Cops (1993).

== Plot ==
Mi-yeong is a former police squad officer who starts working at the Public Service Center after her marriage. Ji-hye is Mi-yeong's sister-in-law as well as a rookie policewoman who works at the same center. They team up to solve the case of a young woman committing suicide and they discover a network of young men who drug, rape and film women and then upload the videos on the internet for money. As the higher ranking police officers stay idle and refuse to help, the two women, with the assistance of a female hacker, start to round up the gang on their own accord.

== Cast ==
- Ra Mi-ran as Mi-yeong
- Lee Sung-kyung as Ji-hye
  - Lee Re as young Ji-hye
- Yoon Sang-hyun as Ji-chul
- Choi Soo-young as Jang-mi
- Yeom Hye-ran as Department Head
- Wi Ha-joon as Jung Woo-jun
- Joo Woo-jae as Lee Phillip
- Han Soo-hyun as Detective Kwak
- Jeon Seok-ho as Detective Oh
- Jo Byung-gyu as youngest detective, team 3 rookie
- Ahn Chang-hwan as Kang Sang-doo
- Jo Hye-joo as Soo-bin
- Park So-eun as Seo-jin
- Lee Jung-min as Chae Sook-hee
- Kang Hong-seok as Kwak Yong-suk
- Kim Do-wan as Sung Chan-yeong
- Ha Jung-woo as motel owner
- Ahn Jae-hong as Happy Balloons Boss
- Sung Dong-il as Team 3 leader

== Production ==
Principal photography began on July 5, 2018, and filming wrapped up on September 27, 2018.

== Release ==
As of August 26, 2019, the film has reached 1,628,963 total admissions grossing $11,378,225 in revenue.

== Television adaptation ==
On October 25, 2019, CJ ENM E&M Division Marketing Chief Choi Kyung-joo announced during OCN's Thriller House event at S-Factory in Seoul that the network will adapt Miss & Mrs. Cops as a drama series. It was scheduled to air in 2020.
