= Kim Sung-ryung =

South Korean actress (born 1967)

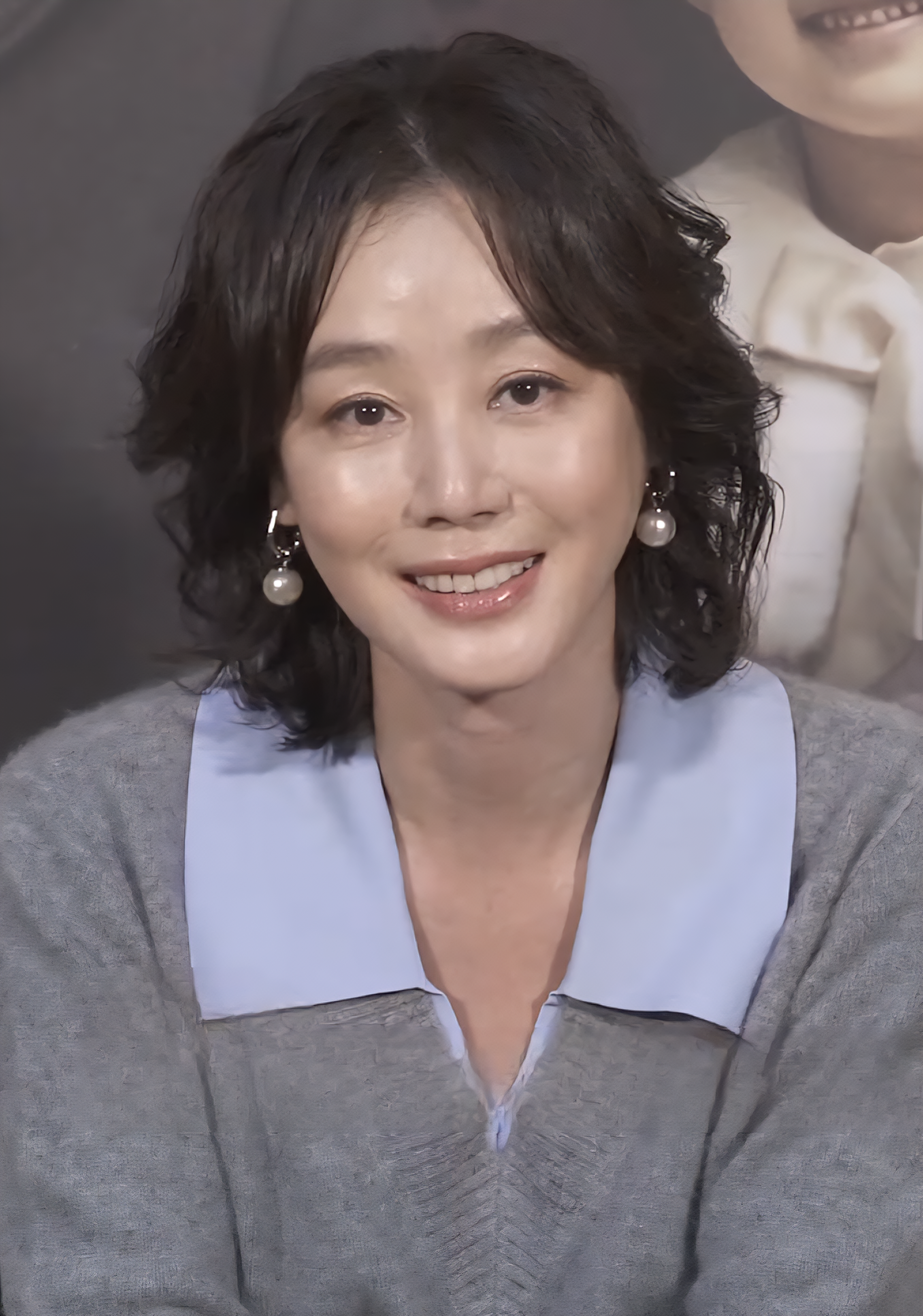
- Kim in November 2024
- Born: February 8, 1967 (age 59); Seoul, South Korea
- Other name: Kim Sung-ryoung
- Education: Inha Institute of Technology; Kyung Hee University; Hankuk University of Foreign Studies - Master's degree
- Occupation: Actress
- Height: 1.68 m (5 ft 6 in)
- Spouse: Lee Ki-soo (m. 1996)
- Children: 2
- Beauty pageant titleholder
- Title: Miss Korea 1988
- No. of films: 16 (as of April 2018)
- Agency: FN Entertainment
- Years active: 1988–present
- Major competitions: Miss Korea 1988 (Winner); Miss Universe 1989 (Contestant)
- Relatives: Kim Sung-kyung (sister)

Korean name
- Hangul: 김성령
- Hanja: 金成鈴
- RR: Gim Seongryeong
- MR: Kim Sŏngnyŏng

Kim Sung-ryung (Korean: 김성령; born February 8, 1967) is a South Korean actress and beauty pageant titleholder. She won Miss Korea 1988 later represented her country at Miss Universe 1989 pageant, Kim began her career as a reporter on KBS's showbiz news program Entertainment Weekly. In 1991, she made her film acting debut in Kang Woo-suk's Who Saw the Dragon's Claws?.

Kim returned to the big screen in 2007, with notable supporting roles in Shadows in the Palace, and Rainbow Eyes, followed by The Client (2011), Mr. XXX-Kisser (2012), The Fatal Encounter (2014), and The Target (2014). As she entered her forties, Kim also became known for the television dramas You're Beautiful (2009), The Chaser (2012), Yawang (2013), The Heirs (2013), and Flower of Queen (2015).

== Filmography ==
=== Film ===
Year	Title	Role	Notes/Ref.
1991	Who Saw the Dragon's Claws?	Kim Ji-won	
1992	A Room in the Woods	Mi-yang	
2007	Shadows in the Palace	Court lady inspector	
2007	Rainbow Eyes	Lee Hye-seo	
2008	Our School's E.T.	School board director Lee	
2010	The Servant	Wol-mae	
2010	71: Into the Fire	Oh Jang-beom's mother	
2011	The Client	Kang Sung-hee's paralegal / office manager	
2012	The Suck Up Project: Mr. XXX-Kisser	Ye-ji	
2012	The Ugly Duckling	Nak-man's mother	
2012	Code Name: Jackal	Angela	
2014	The Target	Jung Young-joo	
2014	The Fatal Encounter	Lady Hyegyŏng	
2016	Will You Be There?	Yeon-ah	Special appearance
2018	Keys to the Heart	Madam Hong	Special appearance
2018	Believer	Oh Yeon-ok	
2020	The Call	Seo-yeon's mother	
2024	My Name Is Loh Kiwan	Ok-hee	Netflix film
2024	Wonderland	Gil-soon	Special appearance
2024	About Family	Bang Jeong-hwa	
2026	Reawaken Man: The Red	Mi-ju	

=== Television series ===
Year	Title	Role
1992	92 Whale Hunting	Dumb waitress Chun-ja
1992	Sunrise	
1993	Stormy Season	Lee Han-sook
1993	Youth Theater	Oh Yoo-kyung
1996	Mountain	Mi-ok
1996	Jo Gwang-jo	Park Gyeongbin
1998	A Very Special Trip	
1998	The King and the Queen	Deposed Queen Lady Yun
1998	Winners	Yoo-ri
1998	MBC Best Theater: "Happy Ending"	
1998	King of the Wind	Princess Hwapyeong
1998	Paper Crane	Min-sook
2000	Juliet's Man	Mi-ra
2000	MBC Best Theater: "Summer Vacation"	OB/GYN doctor Yoon-soo
2000	KBS TV Novel: "The Mind of Governing the People"	Gisaeng from Bian
2000	Gibbs' Family	Yeom Kyung-ok
2001	Empress Myeongseong	Michiko
2001	This is Love	Ahn Do-hae
2002	Drama City: "Ahjumma Band Formation Case"	Seong-mi
2003	Age of Warriors	Mu-bi
2003	Garden of Eve	Baek Ji-ae
2004	Span Drama: "The Snow Queen"	The Snow Queen
2004	MBC Best Theater: "My Mom is a Superwoman"	Woo-jung
2004	Ms. Kim's Million Dollar Quest	Seo Woo-kyung
2004	MBC Best Theater: "Perfect Roommate"	Lee Soo-jung
2004	Count of Myeongdong	Kim Hyun-kyung
2005	Don't Worry	Jo Mi-yeon
2006	My Love Dal-ja	Kang Nan-hee
2007	Hometown Over the Hill	Jeon Se-kyung
2007	Good Day to Love	Kim Hyo-jin
2007	How to Meet a Perfect Neighbor	Jung Mi-hee
2008	The Great King, Sejong	Kim Hyobin
2008	Iljimae	Dan-yi
2009	Ja Myung Go	Mo Ha-so
2009	Soul	Ha-na and Doo-na's mother
2009	You're Beautiful	Mo Hwa-ran
2010	Definitely Neighbors	Kang Mi-jin
2010	Stormy Lovers	Chae Woo-hee
2011	What's Up?	Ha In-young
2011	Padam Padam	Jung Ji-na's mother
2012	Find Someone Who Can	Kim Sung-ryung
2012	Syndrome	Oh Eun-hee
2012	The Chaser	Seo Ji-soo
2013	King of Ambition	Baek Do-kyung
2013	The Heirs	Han Ki-ae
2015	Flower of Queen	Rena Jung / Jung Eun-hye / Lee Soo-jung
2016	Mrs. Cop 2	Ko Yoon-jung
2016	The Legend of the Blue Sea	Jang Jin-ok (Special appearance)
2018	Are You Human?	Oh Ro-ra
2018	The Beauty Inside	Special appearance
2021	Political Fever	Lee Jeong-eun
2022	Kill Heel	Bae Ok-seon
2023	Love to Hate You	Choi Soo-jin
2024	The Frog	
2024	A Virtuous Business	Oh Geum-hee
2025	When Life Gives You Tangerines	Special appearance (episode 11)
2025	Second Shot at Love	Kim Gwang-ok

=== Variety shows ===
Year	Title	Notes/Ref.
1988	Entertainment Weekly	
1991	Delightful Studio	
1995	명사가요 초대석	
2013	Woman Show	
2014	My Tutor Friend	Regular member
2018	Law of the Jungle in Patagonia	Second-half cast member
2020	I Am a Survivor	Regular member
2021	Woman Plus	Host

=== Hosting ===
Year	Title	Notes	Ref.
2017	2017 MBC Drama Awards	with Oh Sang-jin	

=== Radio program ===
Year	Title	Station
1993	Joyful Afternoon with Park Se-min and Kim Sung-ryung	CBS-AM
1995	Music Salon with Kim Sung-ryung	MBC-FM

== Theater ==
Year	Title	Role
1991	A Woman's Choice	
1992	The Merchant of Venice	Portia
2005	Art	Kyung-sook
2008–2009	Melodrama	Kang Yoo-kyung
2014	Miss France	Fleur de Senlis/Martin/Samantha

== Awards and nominations ==
Year	Award	Category	Nominated work	Result
1988	32nd Miss Korea Pageant	Miss Korea - Jin	—N/a	Won
1991	27th Baeksang Arts Awards	Best New Actress	Who Saw the Dragon's Claws?	Won
1991	2nd Chunsa Film Art Awards	Best New Actress	Who Saw the Dragon's Claws?	Won
1991	29th Grand Bell Awards	Best New Actress	Who Saw the Dragon's Claws?	Won
1993	14th Blue Dragon Film Awards	Best Supporting Actress	A Room in the Woods	Nominated
1999	KBS Drama Awards	Excellence Award, Actress	The King and the Queen	Won
2000	SBS Drama Awards	Best Supporting Actress	Juliet's Man	Won
2002	KBS Drama Awards	Best Supporting Actress	Empress Myeongseong	Won
2008	45th Grand Bell Awards	Best Supporting Actress	Shadows in the Palace	Nominated
2008	SBS Drama Awards	Best Supporting Actress in a Drama Special	Iljimae	Nominated
2008	KBS Drama Awards	Best Supporting Actress	The Great King, Sejong	Nominated
2012	SBS Drama Awards	Excellence Award, Actress in a Miniseries	The Chaser	Won
2013	49th Baeksang Arts Awards	Best Actress (TV)	Yawang	Nominated
2013	2nd APAN Star Awards	Acting Award, Actress	Yawang	Won
2013	SBS Drama Awards	Special Award, Actress in a Drama Special	The Heirs	Won
2014	23rd Buil Film Awards	Best Supporting Actress	The Target	Nominated
2014	MBC Entertainment Awards	Popularity Award in a Variety Show	My Tutor Friend	Won
2015	4th APAN Star Awards	Excellence Award, Actress in a Serial Drama	Flower of Queen	Nominated
2016	SBS Drama Awards	Grand Prize (Daesang)	Mrs. Cop 2	Nominated
2016	SBS Drama Awards	Top Excellence Award, Actress in a Genre Drama	Mrs. Cop 2	Nominated
2016	SBS Drama Awards	K-Wave Star Award	Mrs. Cop 2	Nominated
2016	SBS Drama Awards	Top 10 Stars Award	Mrs. Cop 2	Won
2018	2nd The Seoul Awards	Best Supporting Actress (Film)	Keys to the Heart	Nominated
2018	KBS Drama Awards	Best Supporting Actress	Are You Human?	Nominated
2022	20th Director's Cut Awards	Best Actress in series	Political Fever	Nominated
2022	1st Blue Dragon Series Awards	Best Leading Actress	Political Fever	Nominated
2022	8th APAN Star Awards	Top Excellence Award, Actress in a OTT	Political Fever	Won

Preceded by Jang Yoon-jeong	Miss Korea; 1988	Succeeded by Oh Hyun-kyung
