= My Daughter, Geum Sa-wol =

South Korean television series

- Promotional poster for My Daughter, Geum Sa-wol
- Hangul: 내 딸, 금사월
- RR: Nae ttal, Geum Sawol
- MR: Nae ttal, Kŭm Sawŏl
- Genre: Melodrama; Family; Revenge
- Developed by: Park Sung-eun
- Written by: Kim Soon-ok
- Directed by: Baek Ho-min; Lee Jae-jin
- Starring: Baek Jin-hee; Park Se-young; Yoon Hyun-min; Jeon In-hwa; Do Sang-woo
- Country of origin: South Korea
- Original language: Korean
- No. of episodes: 51

Production
- Executive producer: Son Ok-hyun
- Producers: Lee Eon-jeong (MBC); Hwang Jun-young (MBC); Ahn Hyeong-jo (Jidam Inc.)
- Running time: 70 minutes
- Production companies: Jidam Inc. (formerly Yein E&M)

Original release
- Network: MBC
- Release: September 5, 2015 – February 28, 2016

My Daughter, Geum Sa-wol (Korean: 내 딸, 금사월) is a 2015 South Korean television series starring Baek Jin-hee, Park Se-young, Jeon In-hwa, Yoon Hyun-min, and Do Sang-woo. It aired on MBC on Saturdays and Sundays 21:45 for 51 episodes from September 5, 2015 until February 28, 2016. Although the drama enjoyed high viewership ratings, with the finale earning national viewership of 33.6%, critics described the drama as "absurdly unrealistic".

== Plot ==
Sa-wol, Hye-sang and Oh-wol grow up in the same orphanage as best friends. On the day the orphanage collapses, Hye-sang finds out that Sa-wol is to be adopted by her wealthy biological father instead of her, since a DNA test reveals the mix up between them. Eager to be raised in upper class society, Hye-sang traps the orphanage director, who is also her true father, in the collapsing building with Oh-wol to hide the truth. However, when Sa-wol ends up being brought into the family as well, Hye-sang starts tormenting, blame shifting and burying the truth, to make herself the better daughter. As the story continues, her web of lies gets bigger and bigger, and becomes harder to control.

== Cast ==
- Baek Jin-hee as Geum Sa-wol
  - Kal So-won as young Sa-wol
- Park Se-young as Oh Hye-sang
  - Lee Na-yoon as young Hye-sang
- Yoon Hyun-min as Kang Chan-bin
  - Jeon Jin-seo as young Chan-bin
- Jeon In-hwa as Shin Deuk-ye
- Do Sang-woo as Joo Se-hoon
  - Go Woo-rim as child Se-hoon
  - Goo Seung-hyun as young Se-hoon
- Ahn Nae-sang as Joo Ki-hwang
- Song Ha-yoon as Lee Hong-do/Joo Oh-wol
- Son Chang-min as Kang Man-hoo
- Park Sang-won as Oh Min-ho
- Do Ji-won as Han Ji-hye
- Kim Hee-jung as Choi Ma-ri
- Park Won-sook as So Kook-ja
- Lee Yeon-doo as Kang Dal-rae
  - Kwak Ji-hye as child Dal-rae
  - Kim Go-eun as young Dal-rae
- Kang Rae-yeon as Kang Jjil-rae
  - Kim So-eun as child Jjil-rae
  - Park Soo-bin as young Jjil-rae
- Choi Dae-chul as Im Shi-ro
  - Jung Yoon-seok as young Shi-ro
- Kim Bo-yoon as young Kang Dal-rae
- Yoon Bok-in as Yoo Kwon-soon
- Kim Ji-young as Im Mi-rang
- Lee Tae-woo as Im Woo-rang
- Lee Jung-gil as Shin Ji-sang
- Oh Mi-yeon as Kim Hye-soon (Cameo)
- Kim Ho-jin as Geum Hyung-sik (Cameo)
- Kim Ji-ho as Kim Ji-young (Cameo)
- Yoo Jae-suk as himself (Cameo)
- Lee Dong-ha as Hye-sang's lawyer in charge

== Ratings ==
Episode #	Original broadcast date	Average audience share			
Episode #	Original broadcast date	TNmS Ratings		AGB Nielsen	
Episode #	Original broadcast date	Nationwide	Seoul National Capital Area	Nationwide	Seoul National Capital Area
1	September 5, 2015	14.1%	15.1%	14.7%	15.8%
2	September 6, 2015	14.3%	16.1%	15.9%	17.1%
3	September 12, 2015	13.9%	15.3%	16.1%	17.1%
4	September 13, 2015	16.0%	17.3%	17.8%	18.2%
5	September 19, 2015	16.0%	17.3%	18.4%	20.7%
6	September 20, 2015	16.8%	19.0%	17.9%	19.5%
7	September 26, 2015	14.4%	15.7%	15.9%	16.9%
8	September 27, 2015	14.8%	15.3%	16.7%	17.5%
9	October 3, 2015	16.9%	17.6%	18.9%	20.5%
10	October 4, 2015	18.5%	18.8%	20.8%	21.6%
11	October 10, 2015	19.0%	19.3%	21.3%	22.3%
12	October 11, 2015	19.9%	21.0%	22.4%	23.6%
13	October 17, 2015	21.6%	24.0%	21.1%	22.8%
14	October 18, 2015	20.4%	23.2%	22.5%	24.0%
15	October 24, 2015	20.8%	22.8%	21.2%	22.2%
16	October 25, 2015	21.0%	23.6%	23.5%	24.4%
17	October 31, 2015	21.2%	23.2%	22.1%	23.0%
18	November 1, 2015	21.5%	24.0%	23.4%	23.8%
19	November 7, 2015	20.5%	21.0%	23.5%	24.4%
20	November 8, 2015	22.7%	24.5%	27.2%	28.5%
21	November 14, 2015	21.1%	22.2%	24.9%	27.2%
22	November 15, 2015	21.7%	22.5%	27.3%	28.9%
23	November 21, 2015	19.7%	22.1%	23.9%	25.3%
24	November 22, 2015	24.4%	26.3%	26.7%	26.9%
25	November 28, 2015	20.8%	22.3%	25.9%	27.2%
26	November 29, 2015	22.6%	24.7%	27.3%	28.3%
27	December 5, 2015	20.9%	22.8%	24.5%	26.2%
28	December 6, 2015	23.0%	25.3%	28.3%	29.2%
29	December 12, 2015	21.6%	23.0%	25.0%	25.9%
30	December 13, 2015	22.0%	23.2%	27.8%	28.6%
31	December 19, 2015	21.8%	22.8%	27.9%	30.2%
32	December 20, 2015	22.9%	23.5%	29.7%	31.0%
33	December 26, 2015	22.8%	22.5%	28.3%	29.4%
34	December 27, 2015	23.5%	24.7%	32.0%	33.1%
35	January 2, 2016	25.1%	25.7%	28.5%	29.4%
36	January 3, 2016	26.5%	27.5%	30.5%	31.5%
37	January 9, 2016	29.3%	30.5%	30.7%	32.5%
38	January 10, 2016	29.7%	31.4%	31.8%	33.1%
39	January 16, 2016	31.2%	33.0%	31.7%	33.5%
40	January 17, 2016	31.8%	33.2%	31.3%	31.6%
41	January 24, 2016	31.6%	32.1%	32.2%	33.4%
42	January 30, 2016	34.5%	34.3%	34.9%	35.5%
43	January 31, 2016	34.9%	35.0%	34.4%	35.5%
44	February 6, 2016	32.4%	32.4%	32.6%	33.3%
45	February 7, 2016	31.9%	31.7%	30.5%	31.1%
46	February 13, 2016	34.7%	35.9%	34.9%	36.4%
47	February 14, 2016	33.8%	34.6%	33.4%	34.9%
48	February 20, 2016	31.9%	31.7%	33.0%	34.6%
49	February 21, 2016	33.8%	34.1%	33.4%	34.0%
50	February 27, 2016	32.4%	33.0%	33.6%	35.8%
51	February 28, 2016	33.5%	34.2%	33.6%	34.6%
Average		23.7%	24.9%	26.0%	27.3%

- Note: episode 41 wasn't aired on Saturday January 23 due to broadcast of the football Asian Olympic qualification match between South Korea and Jordan. This episode was aired on Sunday January 24, 2016.

== Awards and nominations ==
Year	Award	Category	Recipient	Result
2015	34th MBC Drama Awards	Grand Prize (Daesang)	Jeon In-hwa	Nominated
2015	34th MBC Drama Awards	Drama of the Year	My Daughter, Geum Sa-wol	Nominated
2015	34th MBC Drama Awards	Top Excellence Award, Actress in a Special Project Drama	Jeon In-hwa	Won
2015	34th MBC Drama Awards	Excellence Award, Actor in a Special Project Drama	Son Chang-min	Won
2015	34th MBC Drama Awards	Excellence Award, Actor in a Special Project Drama	Yoon Hyun-min	Nominated
2015	34th MBC Drama Awards	Excellence Award, Actress in a Special Project Drama	Baek Jin-hee	Nominated
2015	34th MBC Drama Awards	Excellence Award, Actress in a Special Project Drama	Park Won-sook	Nominated
2015	34th MBC Drama Awards	Best Supporting Actor in a Special Project Drama	Choi Dae-chul	Nominated
2015	34th MBC Drama Awards	Best Supporting Actress in a Special Project Drama	Do Ji-won	Nominated
2015	34th MBC Drama Awards	Best New Actor in a Special Project Drama	Yoon Hyun-min	Won
2015	34th MBC Drama Awards	Best New Actor in a Special Project Drama	Do Sang-woo	Nominated
2015	34th MBC Drama Awards	Best New Actress in a Special Project Drama	Park Se-young	Nominated
2015	34th MBC Drama Awards	Best New Actress in a Special Project Drama	Song Ha-yoon	Nominated
2015	34th MBC Drama Awards	Best Young Actress	Kal So-won	Won
2015	34th MBC Drama Awards	Top 10 Stars Award	Baek Jin-hee	Won
2016	9th Korea Drama Awards	Top Excellence Award, Actress	Baek Jin-hee	Won
2016	9th Korea Drama Awards	Excellence Award, Actress	Park Se-young	Won
