= The Nice Guy =

2025 South Korean television series

- Promotional poster
- Also known as: The Good Man
- Hangul: 착한 사나이
- RR: Chakhan sanai
- MR: Ch'akhan sanai
- Genre: Romance; Drama; Family; Noir
- Written by: Kim Woon-kyung; Kim Hyo-seok
- Directed by: Song Hae-sung; Park Hong-soo
- Starring: Lee Dong-wook; Lee Sung-kyung; Park Hoon
- Country of origin: South Korea
- Original language: Korean
- No. of episodes: 14

Production
- Running time: 60 minutes
- Production companies: SLL; Hive Media Corp; Higround

Original release
- Network: JTBC
- Release: July 18 – August 29, 2025

The Nice Guy (Korean: 착한 사나이) is a 2025 South Korean television series starring Lee Dong-wook, Lee Sung-kyung, and Park Hoon. It aired on JTBC from July 18, to August 29, 2025, every Friday at 20:50 (KST). It is also available for streaming on Disney+ in selected territories.

== Synopsis ==
The Good Man depicts the struggles of Seok-cheol, the eldest grandson of a three-generation gangster family, to protect his family, job, and love.

== Cast and characters ==
=== Main ===
- Lee Dong-wook as Park Seok-cheol

The eldest grandson of a third-generation gangster family.

- Lee Sung-kyung as Kang Mi-young

An ambitious girl who dreams of becoming a singer.

- Park Hoon as Kang Tae-hoon

Chairman of Samjon Construction, a competitor of Myungsan Industries.

=== Supporting ===
==== Park's Family ====
- Cheon Ho-jin as Park Sil-gon

Seok-chul's father, once a notorious gangster across the country, now lives in the wilderness, cultivating a vegetable garden. Sil-gon regrets his past that led his son into the world of gangs.

- Oh Na-ra as Park Seok-gyeong

The eldest sister of Seok-cheol and the eldest of the three Park siblings.

- Ryu Hye-young as Park Seok-hee

Seok-cheol's upright younger sister.

- Park Myung-shin as Jo Mok-son

Park Seok-cheol's mother.

- Choi Yi-jun as Hyung-geun

Seok-gyeong's son, a sweet and affectionate little boy who misses his mother who ran away from home.

==== Myeongsan Industry ====
- Lee Moon-sik as Kim Chang-soo
- Han Jae-young as Oh Sang-yeol
- Park Du-sik as Son Heung-man
- Cha Si-won as Lee Du-sik
- Oh Seung-baek as Woo-seok

==== Samjun Construction ====
- Kim Min-gwi as Im Bok-cheon
- Han-min as Cheon-ho

==== Others ====
- Yoo Seung-mok as Sak Dae-ki
- Park Won-sang as Kim Jin-ho
- Lee Jung-hyun as Young-ji
- Moon Tae-yoo as Jang Ki-hong
- Park Mi-hyeon as Yoon Hye-sook

Mi-young's mother.

- Kim Do-yoon as Yoon Byung-soo
- Park Sung-yeon as Go Jeong-nim

== Production ==
=== Development ===
The Good Man is directed by Song Hae-sung, Park Hong-soo and written by Kim Woon-kyung and Kim Hyo-seok. It is co-produced by SLL, Hive Media Corp and HIGROUND.

=== Casting ===
On September 29, 2022, Starship Entertainment told Newsen that Lee Dong-wook had been offered to star in the series and was in discussions. In August 2024, it was reported that Lee had confirmed his appearance in the series. On March 3, 2023, Newsen reported that Ryu Hye-young was in discussions to appear as Seok-cheol's upright younger sister, Park Seok-hee. The same news outlet reported that Lee Sung-kyung had received an offer and was reviewing it on November 15, 2023. On January 24, 2024, according to Joy News 24, Oh Na-ra had confirmed her appearance in the series. On August 27, Hankook Ilbo reported that Park Hoon had joined the series.

=== Filming ===
Filming was already in progress on May 28, 2024. The Good Man wrapped up filming at the end of August 2024.

== Release ==
On May 27, 2025, JTBC revealed its drama lineup for the second half of 2025. It is scheduled to premiere on July 18, 2025, and airs every Friday at 20:50 (KST). The series is also set to release on Disney+ in selected territories.

== Viewership ==
The Nice Guy : South Korea viewers per episode (thousands)

Season	Episode number														Average
Season	1	2	3	4	5	6	7	8	9	10	11	12	13	14	Average
1	660	732	445	665	439	569	436	514	444	530	384	551	545	721	545

Source: Audience measurement performed nationwide by Nielsen Korea.

Average TV viewership ratings
Ep.	Original broadcast date	Average audience share	
Ep.	Original broadcast date	(Nielsen Korea)	
Ep.	Original broadcast date	Nationwide	Seoul
1	July 18, 2025	3.039% (3rd)	2.489% (3rd)
2	July 18, 2025	3.225% (2nd)	2.694% (2nd)
3	July 25, 2025	2.178% (4th)	2.024% (3rd)
4	July 25, 2025	2.838% (2nd)	3.490% (2nd)
5	August 1, 2025	1.879% (6th)	1.940% (4th)
6	August 1, 2025	2.588% (2nd)	2.281% (3rd)
7	August 8, 2025	2.153% (4th)	2.162% (3rd)
8	August 8, 2025	2.328% (3rd)	2.273% (2nd)
9	August 15, 2025	2.006% (4th)	1.615% (4th)
10	August 15, 2025	2.311% (3rd)	2.046% (3rd)
11	August 22, 2025	1.672% (9th)	1.557% (4th)
12	August 22, 2025	2.368% (2nd)	1.741% (2nd)
13	August 29, 2025	2.405% (3rd)	2.350% (3rd)
14	August 29, 2025	3.082% (1st)	2.788% (2nd)
Average		2.434%	2.246%
In the table above, the blue numbers represent the lowest ratings and the red numbers represent the highest ratings.; This drama aired on a cable channel/pay TV which normally has a relatively smaller audience compared to free-to-air TV/public broadcasters (KBS, SBS, MBC, and EBS).
