= Lee Sung-kyung =

South Korean actress and model (born 1990)

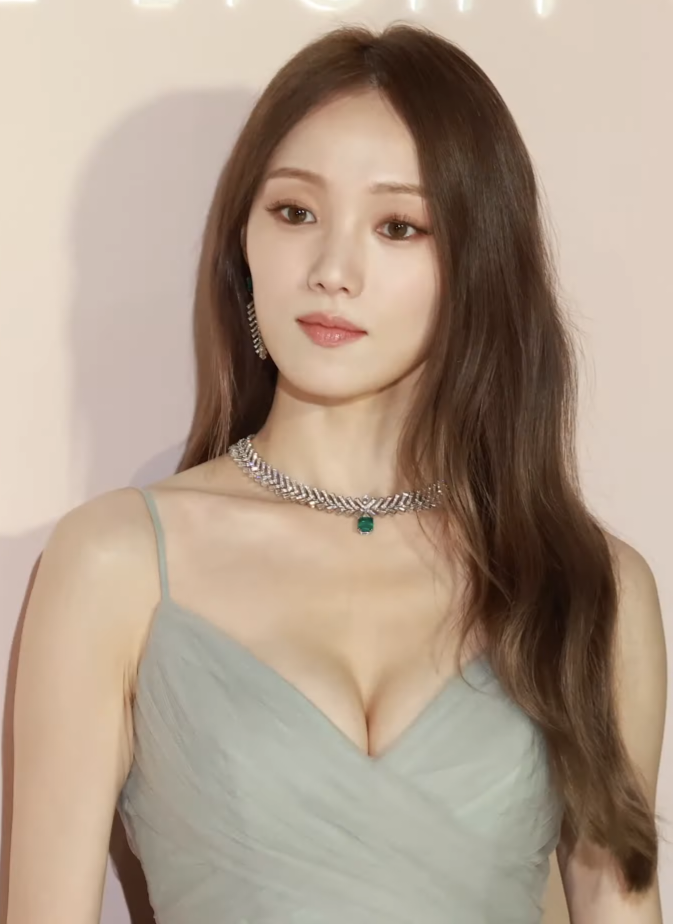
- Lee in March 2025
- Born: August 10, 1990 (age 36); Goyang, South Korea
- Other name: Lee Sung-kyoung
- Education: Dongduk Women's University
- Occupations: Actress; model; singer
- Years active: 2008–present
- Agent: Fantagio
- Height: 175 cm (5 ft 9 in)
- Relatives: Lee Sung-eun (sister)
- Awards: Full list

Korean name
- Hangul: 이성경
- RR: I Seonggyeong
- MR: I Sŏnggyŏng
- Website: fantagio.kr

Signature
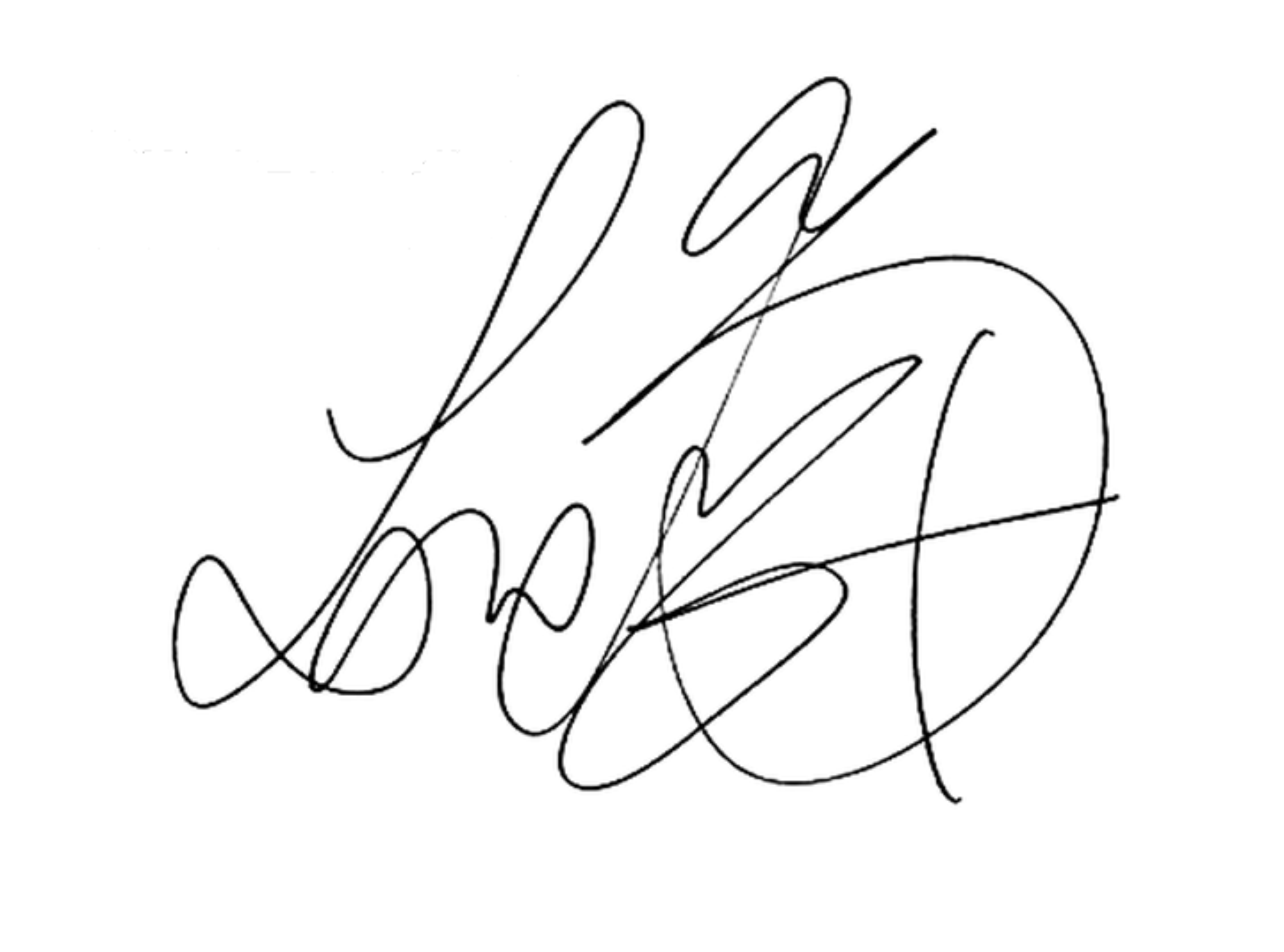

Lee Sung-kyung (Korean: 이성경; born August 10, 1990) is a South Korean model, actress and singer. She is best known for her roles in television series Cheese in the Trap (2016), The Doctors (2016), Weightlifting Fairy Kim Bok-joo (2016), and the second and third seasons of Dr. Romantic (2020–2023).

== Early life and education ==
Lee was born on August 10, 1990, in Goyang, South Korea. Lee has one younger sister, Lee Sung-eun, who is a musical actress. On February 22, 2016, Lee graduated from Dongduk Women's University.

== Career ==
=== 2008–2013: Beginnings as a model ===
Lee began her entertainment career as a model where she competed at the local Super Model Contest in 2008. In 2013, The Papers collaborated with Lee with the single "I Love You".

=== 2014–2017: Acting and singing debut ===
In 2014, Lee made her acting debut with a supporting role in television drama It's Okay, That's Love, being the first model-actress promoted under YG KPlus, the joint venture of YG Entertainment and K-Plus. This was followed by weekend drama, Flower of Queen in 2015. She won "Best New Actress" in a Special Project Drama at the MBC Drama Awards for her role.

In January 2016, Lee featured in tvN's college romance series, Cheese in the Trap. On April 28, 2016, Lee released a collaboration single with Eddy Kim, which is a cover of Sharp's "My Lips like Warm Coffee". Lee then starred in the SBS' prime-time medical drama, The Doctors as a neurosurgeon.

The same year, she took on her first leading role in Weightlifting Fairy Kim Bok-joo, a youth sports drama inspired by the real-life story of Olympic weightlifting champion Jang Mi-ran. In 2017, Lee dubbed the film Trolls alongside Park Hyung-sik. She was also cast in the romance film Love+Sling, directed by first-time director Kim Dae-woong. She was also featured in Psy's 4×2=8 with the single "Last Scene".

=== 2018–present: Rising popularity ===
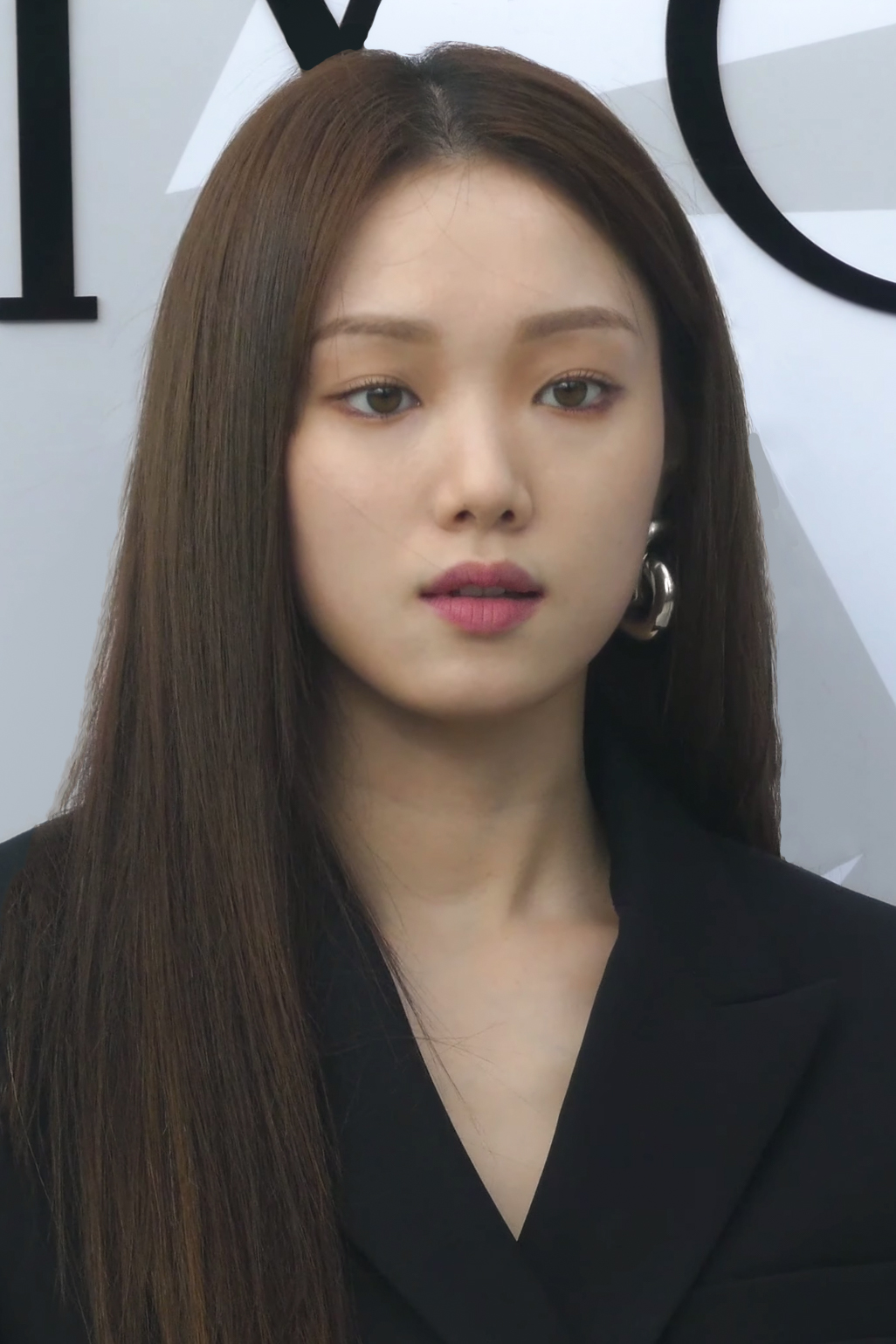
Lee in 2019

In 2018, Lee starred in the fantasy melodrama About Time. In 2019, She starred in the action comedy film Miss & Mrs. Cops released on May 9, 2019, alongside Ra Mi-ran. In 2020, Lee starred in the second season of the hit medical drama Dr. Romantic, playing Cha Eun-jae, a skilled cardiothoracic surgeon with Ahn Hyo-seop as her leading man.

In 2022, Lee starred in the tvN drama Shooting Stars alongside Kim Young-dae. In 2023, Lee starred in Disney+ Original drama Call It Love. and returning in season three of the medical drama Dr. Romantic replaying the role of Cha Eun-jae. On December 13, she released her first song "Eat Sleep Live Repeat" with Lee Chan-hyuk from AKMU.

In 2024, Lee was chosen to play the role of Princess Jasmine in the Korean-adaption of the 2011 musical Aladdin and it is her first musical debut career. On August 20, iQIYI announced Lee will be participate in the International Boy Group Talent Show, Starlight Boys as an MC.

In June 2025, after YG Entertainment announced it would end its actor management division, Lee signed an exclusive contract with Fantagio. Lee starred in JTBC's romance drama The Nice Guy opposite Lee Dong-wook where she played an ambitious aspiring singer.

In 2026, Lee starred in the MBC TV romance drama In Your Radiant Season opposite Chae Jong-hyeop.

== Philanthropy ==
On August 12, 2022, Lee donated ₩100 million to help those affected by the 2022 South Korea floods through the Hope Bridge Korea Disaster Relief Association. At the end of 2023, Lee donated ₩50 million to the Comprehensive Support Center for Seniors Living Alone. On January 15, 2024, Lee donated ₩100 million to Dankook University Hospital. This donation was made in response to Lee's appearance in the SBS drama Dr. Romantic 3.

== Musical theatre ==
Musical play performances
Year	Title	Role	Date	Ref.
2024–2025	Aladdin (알라딘)	Jasmine	November 22, 2024 – July 2025	

== Discography ==
=== Singles ===
Title	Year	Peak chart position	Album
Title	Year	Gaon	Album
As featured artist
"My Lips like Warm Coffee" (내 입술 따뜻한 커피처럼) (Eddy Kim feat. Lee Sung-kyung)	2016	3	Non-album single
"Last Scene" (마지막 장면) (Psy feat. Lee Sung-kyung)	2017	13	4X2=8
Collaborations
"I Love You" (사랑의 단상) (with The Papers)	2013	—	랑의 단상 Chapter 4: You and Me Song
"Love" (러브) (with Loco)	2021	25	Duet Mate
"Eat Sleep Live Repeat" (잘 먹고 잘 살아) (with Lee Chan-hyuk)	2023	—	Non-album single
Soundtrack appearances
"True Colors" (세로라이브) (with Park Hyung-sik)	2017	—	Trolls OST (Korean version)
"Get Back Up Again"	2017	—	Trolls OST (Korean version)
"My Only One Person"	2018	—	About Time OST Musical Special
"I Am What I Am"	2018	—	About Time OST Musical Special
"Tomorrow will be a better day! "	2018	—	About Time OST Musical Special
"Show Time" (with Ra Mi-ran)	2019	—	Miss & Mrs. Cops OST
"Thank You for the Memories" (고마워 추억이 되어줘서) (with Dr. Romantic 3 Cast)	2023	—	Dr. Romantic 3 OST Part 10
"Let the Star Shine Us Again" (이별이 다시 우릴 비춰주길) (with Lim Seul-ong)	2024	—	Transit Love 3 OST Part 7
"Unspoken" (아무 말 하지 마요)	2025	—	The Nice Guy OST
"—" denotes releases that did not chart or were not released in that region.

== Bibliography ==
Year	Title	Publisher	ISBN	Notes
2016	Be Joyful	Paperbook	ISBN 9788997148615	Photobook

== Ambassadorship ==
Year	Organization	Title	Ref.
2024	Korea Brand & Entertainment Expo (KBEE)	Tokyo Hallyu Honorary Ambassador	

== Accolades ==
=== Awards and nominations ===
Name of the award ceremony, year presented, category, nominee of the award, and the result of the nomination
Award ceremony	Year	Category	Nominee / work	Result	Ref.
APAN Star Awards	2015	Best New Actress	Flower of Queen	Nominated	
APAN Star Awards	2020	Excellence Award, Actress in a Miniseries	Dr. Romantic 2	Nominated	
APAN Star Awards	2023	Top Excellence Award	Dr. Romantic 3	Won	
APAN Star Awards	2023	Seoul League Actors Award	Dr. Romantic 3	Won	
Asia Artist Awards	2018	Artist of the Year	Lee Sung-kyung	Won	
Asia Artist Awards	2018	Best Emotive	Lee Sung-kyung	Won	
Asia Artist Awards	2020	Best Actress Award	Dr. Romantic 2	Won	
Asia Model Awards (Note: Asia Model Awards is an annual ceremony that recognizes Asia's top models and celebrities.)	2020	Model Star Award	Lee Sung-kyung	Won	
Asia Pacific Super Model Contest	2009	Unix Hair New Style Prize	Lee Sung-kyung	Won	
Asia Star Entertainer Awards	2026	Best Character (Actress)	Lee Sung-kyung	Won	
Baeksang Arts Awards	2016	Best New Actress (TV)	Queen's Flower	Nominated	
CFDK Fashion Awards	2014	Best Female Fashion Model of the Year	Lee Sung-kyung	Won	
Chunsa Film Art Awards	2019	Special Popularity Award	Miss & Mrs. Cops	Won	
Korea Drama Awards	2015	Best New Actress	Flower of Queen	Nominated	
Korea Musical Awards	2026	Best New Actress	Aladdin (알라딘)	Won	
Max Movie Awards	2016	Rising Star Award	Lee Sung-kyung	Won	
MBC Drama Awards	2015	Best New Actress in a Special Project Drama	Flower of Queen	Won	
MBC Drama Awards	2015	Popularity Award, Actress	Flower of Queen	Nominated	
MBC Drama Awards	2015	Best Couple Award	Flower of Queen (with Yoon Park)	Nominated	
MBC Drama Awards	2016	Excellence Award, Actress in a Miniseries	Weightlifting Fairy Kim Bok-joo	Won	
MBC Drama Awards	2016	Best Couple Award	Weightlifting Fairy Kim Bok-joo (with Nam Joo-hyuk)	Nominated	
SBS Drama Awards	2016	Special Award, Actress in a Genre Drama	The Doctors	Nominated	
SBS Drama Awards	2020	Excellence Award, Actress in a Miniseries Action Drama	Dr. Romantic 2	Won	
SBS Drama Awards	2020	Best Couple Award	Dr. Romantic 2 (with Ahn Hyo-seop)	Nominated	
SBS Drama Awards	2023	Top Excellence Award, Actress in a Seasonal Drama	Dr. Romantic 3	Won	
SBS Drama Awards	2023	Best Supporting Team	Dr. Romantic 3	Won	
SBS Drama Awards	2023	Best Couple Award	Dr. Romantic 3 (with Ahn Hyo-seop)	Nominated	
Super Model Contest	2008	Lex Prize	Lee Sung-kyung	Won	

=== Listicles ===
Name of publisher, year listed, name of listicle, and placement
Publisher	Year	Listicle	Placement	Ref.
Korean Film Council	2021	Korean Actors 200 (Note: Introduces 200 actors that best represent the present and future of Korean cinema to the people in the film industry all over the world.)	Included	
