= Flower of Queen =

2015 South Korean television series

- Promotional poster
- Genre: Melodrama
- Written by: Park Hyun-joo
- Directed by: Lee Dae-young; Kim Min-shik
- Starring: Kim Sung-ryung; Lee Sung-kyung
- Country of origin: South Korea
- Original language: Korean
- No. of episodes: 50

Production
- Executive producer: Park Sung-eun
- Producers: Oh Sung-min; Son Gi-won
- Production locations: South Korea; Kaohsiung
- Running time: 70 minutes
- Production companies: GnG Production; Kim Jong-hak Production

Original release
- Network: Munhwa Broadcasting Corporation
- Release: March 14 – August 30, 2015

Flower of Queen (Korean: 여왕의 꽃; RR: Yeowangui kkot; lit. 'Queen's Flower') is a 2015 South Korean television series starring Kim Sung-ryung, Lee Sung-kyung, Lee Jong-hyuk and Yoon Park. It aired on MBC on Saturdays and Sundays 21:45 for 50 episodes beginning March 14, 2015.

== Plot ==
Lee Soo-jung is at the end of her rope when her boyfriend leaves her and their newborn baby due to financial problems. So Soo-jung gives up her daughter for adoption, then migrates to the United States in search of the American dream. There, she changes her name to Rena Jung and enrolls at a culinary school. But success eludes her, forcing her to return to Korea twenty years later. Still beautiful and extremely ambitious, Rena becomes a celebrity chef who hosts her own cooking show. She has no qualms about forging her credentials, manipulating people, and stealing others ideas. Her ultimate goal is to enter a loveless marriage for wealth and fame, and her target is Park Min-joon, the eldest son of the chairman of TNC Group.

Park Min-joon lost his mother at a young age, and his father Park Tae-soo remarried, but his stepmother Ma Hee-ra drove a wedge between the father and son with her scheming ways. Min-joon grows up to become a cynical, overly serious workaholic who has no interest in women and doesn't find them worth his time, but who hides a lonely soul craving for connection. Then one day, he meets Rena, who was hired to manage one of TNC Group's new restaurants. Min-joon becomes smitten with her and asks her to marry him. When he eventually finds out that Rena had orchestrated the whole ploy to seduce him so that she could someday take over TNC Group, he feels shocked and betrayed. But as Min-joon withdraws emotionally, Rena's feelings of love for him become real.

Min-joon's younger half-brother is a rich playboy Park Jae-joon. He is obedient to the wishes of his mother Hee-ra, who dotes on him and pressured him to enter medical school and become a plastic surgeon. She sets up a matchmaking blind date in Kaohsiung, Taiwan with her son and Seo Yoo-ra, the only daughter of the doctor couple Seo In-chul and Choi Hye-jin. But instead Jae-joon meets Kang Yi-sol, who unbeknownst to him Yoo-ra had paid to take her place. He falls for Yi-sol instantly, then becomes bitter and disappointed upon learning the truth, and mistakenly assumes Yi-sol to be a mercenary.

Kang Yi-Sol had a happy and loving upbringing in Taiwan despite her poverty. Nursing a broken heart after her short, failed relationship with Jae-joon, she flies to Korea to attend her grandmother's funeral. While going through her grandmother's belongings, Yi-sol learns that the woman who raised her, Gu Yang-soon, is not her biological mother. She tracks down her biological father, who turns out to be Yoo-ra's father Seo In-chul, but he wants nothing to do with her. As she does further digging into the past, Yi-sol comes ever closer to finding out that the biological mother who abandoned her is none other than Rena Jung.

== Cast ==
- Kim Sung-ryung as Rena Jung/Jung Eun-hye/Lee Soo-jung, chef
- Lee Sung-kyung as Kang Yi-sol, biological daughter of Rena and adoptive daughter of Yang-soon
- Lee Jong-hyuk as Park Min-joon, elder son and heir apparent to TNC Group
- Yoon Park as Park Jae-joon, younger step-brother of Min-joon and medical student

=== Park household ===
- Kim Mi-sook as Ma Hee-ra, mother of Jae-joon and step-mother of Min-joon
- Jang Yong as Park Tae-soo, father of Min-joon and Jae-joon, chairman of TNC Group
- Sunwoo Yong-nyeo as Bang Eun-ah, mother of Hee-ra
- Oh Dae-hwan as Ma Chang-soo, younger brother of Hee-ra

=== Seo household ===
- Jang Young-nam as Choi Hye-jin, mother of Yoo-ra, plastic surgeon and friend of Hee-ra
- Lee Hyung-chul as Seo In-chul, father of Yoo-ra, plastic surgeon
- Go Woo-ri as Seo Yoo-ra, party girl studying in Kaohsiung who tries to get out of matchmaking date with Jae-joon

=== Yi-sol's family ===
- Song Ok-sook as Gu Yang-soon, adoptive mother of Yi-sol
- Lee Hye-in as Kang Eun-sol, younger sister of Yi-sol
- Jo Hyung-ki as Heo Sam-shik, family friend who along with his two sons live with Yang-soon and her daughters
- Kang Tae-oh as Heo Dong-gu, elder son of Sam-shik
- Choi Ro-woon as Heo Young-gu, younger son of Sam-shik

=== Other characters ===
- Yang Jung-a as Jung Hee-yeon, talk show host
- Choi Eun-kyung as Chef Na
- Jo Han-chul as Kim Do-shin
- Jung Hee-tae as Julian
- Son Hwa-ryung as Section Chief Oh
- Kim Chae-yeon as Shin Ji-soo

== Awards and nominations ==
| Year | Award | Category | Recipient | Result |
|---|---|---|---|---|
| 2015 | 8th Korea Drama Awards | Best New Actress | Lee Sung-kyung | Nominated |
| 2015 | 4th APAN Star Awards | Excellence Award, Actress in a Serial Drama | Kim Sung-ryung | Nominated |
| 2015 | 4th APAN Star Awards | Best New Actress | Lee Sung-kyung | Nominated |
| 2015 | 2015 MBC Drama Awards | Top Excellence Award, Actress in a Special Project Drama | Kim Sung-ryung | Nominated |
| 2015 | 2015 MBC Drama Awards | Top Excellence Award, Actor in a Special Project Drama | Lee Jong-hyuk | Nominated |
| 2015 | 2015 MBC Drama Awards | Excellence Award, Actress in a Special Project Drama | Kim Mi-sook | Nominated |
| 2015 | 2015 MBC Drama Awards | Best Supporting Actress in a Special Project Drama | Jang Young-nam | Nominated |
| 2015 | 2015 MBC Drama Awards | Best Supporting Actor in a Special Project Drama | Jo Han-chul | Nominated |
| 2015 | 2015 MBC Drama Awards | Best New Actress in Special Project Drama | Lee Sung-kyung | Won |
| 2015 | 2015 MBC Drama Awards | Best New Actor in Special Project Drama | Yoon Park | Nominated |
| 2016 | 52nd Baeksang Arts Awards | Best New Actress (TV) | Lee Sung-kyung | Nominated |

== Remake ==
- Vietnam - This series is remade in Vietnam as Hoa vương, aired on government-owned HTV2 and VieOn on May 8, 2023.
