= Kal So-won =

South Korean actress (born 2006)

- Kal in 2026
- Born: 14 August 2006 (age 20); Seoul, South Korea
- Other name: Gal So-won
- Education: Aewol Middle School
- Occupation: Actress
- Years active: 2012–present
- Awards: Full list

Korean name
- Hangul: 갈소원
- Hanja: 葛瀟轅
- RR: Gal Sowon
- MR: Kal Sowŏn

Kal So-won (Korean: 갈소원; born 14 August 2006) is a South Korean child actress. She debuted with the television series Take Care of Us, Captain (2012) and is best known for starring in Miracle in Cell No. 7 (2013), one of the best-selling Korean films of all time.

== Life and career ==
Kal So-won (Korean: 갈소원) was born on 14 August 2006 in Seoul, South Korea. Her family consists of her parents and Kal Sun-woo, her younger brother who was born two years after. Kal is also the granddaughter of Jo Eun-il, a writer who is known for one of the best-selling series' "Baker Mom's 100 Point Diary" (빵점엄마 백점일기). Jo had also previously written pieces based on her granddaughter's life in the format of letters similarly to diary entries. Kal briefly attended Seoul Ojung Elementary School before transferring to Nabeup Elementary School. She currently resides in Jeju Island and attends Aewol Middle School.

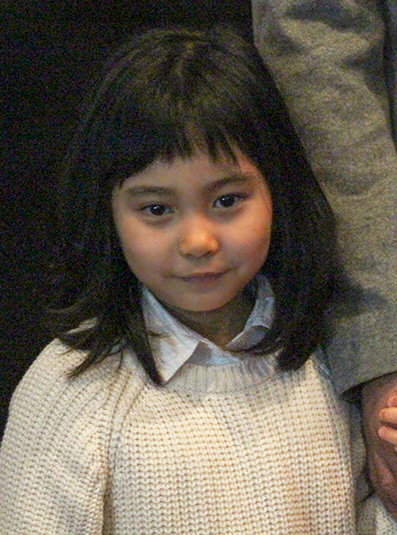
Kal attending the Miracle in Cell No. 7 stage greeting in 2013

6-year-old Kal began her journey as a child actress following her debut acting role in Take Care of Us, Captain (2012). Her performance in the South Korean film, Miracle in Cell No. 7 (2013) gained her domestic recognition after becoming one of the best-selling Korean films of all time. Her role earned her numerous nominations and awards including "Best New Actress" at the Baeksang Arts Awards and Max Movie Best Film Awards, and notably made her the youngest nominee for the "Best New Actress" and "Best Actress" awards in the history of the Grand Bell Awards'. In February 2014, Kal signed an exclusive contract under YG Entertainment. She revealed amongst several candidates, she chose YG Entertainment as her first agency. In celebration, she had a meal with singers and actors including Big Bang, 2NE1, Cha Seung-won, and Yoo In-na. Under the agency, her credits include the television series' My Daughter, Geum Sa-wol (2015), Glamorous Temptation (2015), The Doctors (2016), The Legend of the Blue Sea (2016), and A Korean Odyssey (2017).

In 2015, Kal joined BigBang onstage and performed the intro to their single "Blue" at their MADE World Tour held in Seoul, South Korea. Kal also appeared as a guest performer for iKon during the first portion of their stage for the single "Love Scenario" (사랑을 했다) at the 2018 Continue Tour held in Seoul, South Korea.

Kal has been on a hiatus from acting since 2023.

In 2025, after YG Entertainment announced it would end its actor management division, her contract expired in May.

== Ambassadorship ==
| Year | Title | Ref. |
|---|---|---|
| 2013 | Handon Public Relations Ambassador | |
| 2013 | The Seoul Guro Children Film Festival | |
| 2013 | Suncheon Bay World Animal Film Festival | |
| 2014 | Child Abuse Prevention | |
| 2016 | Child Safety Ambassador | |

== Filmography ==
=== Film ===
| Year | Title | | Role | Notes | Ref. |
| Year | English | Korean | Role | Notes | Ref. |
|---|---|---|---|---|---|
| 2012 | The Taste of Money | 돈의 맛 | Ri-ni | | |
| 2013 | Miracle in Cell No. 7 | 7번방의 선물 | Ye-seung (young) | | |
| 2013 | One Stormy Night | 폭풍우 치는 밤에 | Narrator | Dubbing | (Note: Animated movie) |
| 2020 | Mr. Zoo: The Missing VIP | 미스터 주: 사라진 VIP | Seo-yeon | | |

=== Television series ===
| Year | Title | | Role | Notes | Ref. |
| Year | English | Korean | Role | Notes | Ref. |
|---|---|---|---|---|---|
| 2012 | Take Care of Us, Captain | 부탁해요 캡틴 | Han Da-yeon | | (Note: Acting debut) |
| 2013 | The Secret of Birth | 출생의 비밀 | Hong Hae-deum | | |
| 2013 | Medical Top Team | 메디컬 탑팀 | Eun Ba-wi | | |
| 2014 | Lump in My Life | 내 인생의 혹 | Geum-ji (young) | | (Note: MBC Drama Festival Chuseok Special) |
| 2015 | My Daughter, Geum Sa-wol | 내 딸, 금사월 | Geum Sa-wol (young) | | |
| 2015 | Glamorous Temptation | 화려한 유혹 | Hong Mi-rae | | |
| 2016 | The Doctors | 닥터스 | Hye-jeong (young) | | |
| 2016 | The Legend of the Blue Sea | 푸른 바다의 전설 | Se-hwa (young) | | |
| 2017 | A Korean Odyssey | 화유기 | Jin Seon-mi (young) | | |
| 2022 | Tomorrow | 내일 | Goo-ryeon (young) | | |
| 2022 | Cleaning Up | 클리닝업 | Jin Yu-na | | |
| 2023 | Delivery Man | 딜리버리맨 | Choi Ha-yul | Cameo (episode 5–6) | |

=== Web series ===
| Year | Title | | Role | Notes | Ref. |
| Year | English | Korean | Role | Notes | Ref. |
|---|---|---|---|---|---|
| 2018 | YG Future Strategy Office | YG 전략자료본부 | Herself | Cameo (Episode 6) | |
| 2021 | Writing Your Destiny | 당신의 운명을 쓰고있습니다 | Sam-shin | | |

=== Television show ===
| Year | Title | | Role | Notes | Ref. |
| Year | English | Korean | Role | Notes | Ref. |
|---|---|---|---|---|---|
| 2018 | Nest Escape 3 | 둥지탈출3 | Cast member | Episode 4 | |
| 2020 | King of Mask Singer | 복면가왕 | Contestant (Innocent Manga) | Episodes 281–282 | |

=== Music video appearances ===
| Year | Title | Artist | Length | Ref. |
|---|---|---|---|---|
| 2013 | "After Winter" (이 겨울이 가도) | Koyote (featuring Kal So-won) | 4:06 | |
| 2013 | "Hurtful" (아프고 아프다) | Shin Ji-hoon | 3:07 | |

== Awards and nominations ==
Name of the award ceremony, year presented, award category, nominee(s) of the award, and the result of the nomination
| Award ceremony | Year | Category | Nominee(s) / work(s) | Result | Ref. |
|---|---|---|---|---|---|
| APAN Star Awards | 2015 | Best Young Actress | My Daughter, Geum Sa-wol | Won | |
| Baeksang Arts Awards | 2013 | Best New Actress – Film | Miracle in Cell No. 7 | Nominated | |
| Buil Film Awards | 2013 | Best New Actress | Miracle in Cell No. 7 | Nominated | |
| Grand Bell Awards | 2013 | Best New Actress | Miracle in Cell No. 7 | Nominated | |
| Grand Bell Awards | 2013 | Best Actress | Miracle in Cell No. 7 | Nominated | |
| Grand Bell Awards | 2013 | Special Jury | Miracle in Cell No. 7 | Won | |
| Korea Drama Awards | 2013 | Best Young Actress | The Secret of Birth | Won | |
| Korea Yakult Superstar V-KIDS Contest | 2011 | —N/a | Kal So-won | Won | |
| Max Movie Awards | 2014 | Best New Actress | Miracle in Cell No. 7 | Won | |
| MBC Drama Awards | 2015 | Best Young Actress | My Daughter, Geum Sa-wol; Glamorous Temptation | Won | |
