= 2nd APAN Star Awards =

2013 edition of award ceremony

- Date: November 16, 2013
- Site: Jeongsimhwa International Cultural Center; Chungnam National University, Daejeon
- Hosted by: Park So-yeon; Lee Hwi-jae

The 2nd APAN Star Awards was held on November 16, 2013 at the Hall of Jeongsimhwa International Cultural Center, Chungnam National University in Daejeon, hosted by T-ara's Park So-yeon and Lee Hwi-jae. First held in 2012, the annual awards ceremony recognizes the excellence in South Korea's television. The nominees were chosen from 75 Korean dramas that aired from November 1, 2012 to September 30, 2013.

The highest honor of the ceremony, Grand Prize (Daesang), was awarded to the actress Song Hye-kyo of the drama series That Winter, the Wind Blows.

== Nominations and winners ==
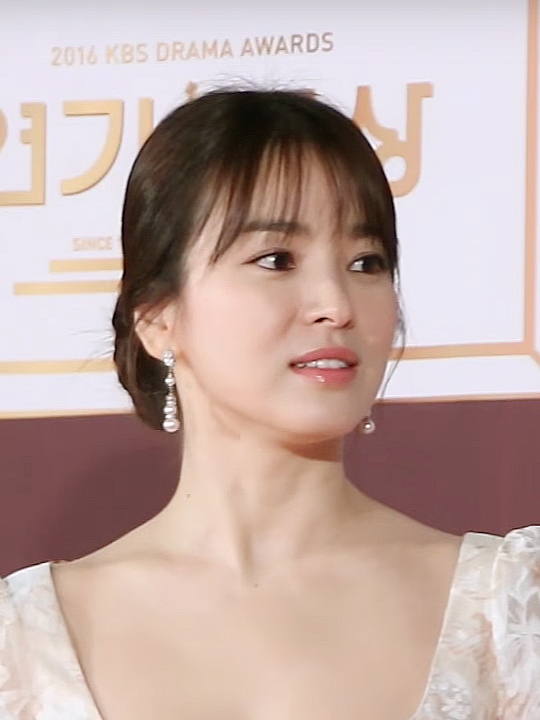
Song Hye-kyo — Grand Prize (Daesang) winner for That Winter, the Wind Blows

Winners are listed first, highlighted in boldface, and indicated with a dagger (†).

**Grand Prize (Daesang)**: **Song Hye-kyo** - **That Winter, the Wind Blows** †	**Achievement Award**: **Choo Ja-hyun** †; **Jung Doo-hong** †
**Top Excellence Award, Actor**: **Lee Joon-gi** - **Two Weeks** †; Go Soo - Empire of Gold; Zo In-sung - That Winter, the Wind Blows; Joo Won - Good Doctor; So Ji-sub - Master's Sun	**Top Excellence Award, Actress**: **Lee Bo-young** - **I Can Hear Your Voice**, **Seoyoung, My Daughter** †; Gong Hyo-jin - Master's Sun; Kim Hye-soo - Queen of the Office; Song Hye-kyo - That Winter, the Wind Blows; Soo Ae - Yawang
**Excellence Award, Actor**: **Lee Jong-suk** - **I Can Hear Your Voice** †; Joo Sang-wook - Good Doctor; Lee Jin-wook - Nine; Lee Sang-yoon - Seoyoung, My Daughter; Lee Seung-gi - Gu Family Book	**Excellence Award, Actress**: **Kim So-yeon** - **Two Weeks** †; Eugene - A Hundred Year Legacy; Han Ji-hye - Pots of Gold; Kim Hyun-joo - Blooded Palace: The War of Flowers; Moon Chae-won - Good Doctor
**Acting Award, Actor**: **Jung Woong-in** - **I Can Hear Your Voice** †; Chun Ho-jin - Seoyoung, My Daughter, Two Weeks; Kim Kyu-chul - That Winter, the Wind Blows; Kim Tae-woo - That Winter, the Wind Blows; Lee Sung-jae - Gu Family Book	**Acting Award, Actress**: **Kim Sung-ryung** - **Yawang** †; Go Joon-hee - Yawang; Jang Shin-young - Empire of Gold, Flower of Revenge; Jang Young-nam - Goddess of Marriage, Jang Ok-jung, Living by Love, The Birth of a Family; Park Shin-hye - Flower Boys Next Door
**Best New Actor**: **Choi Jin-hyuk** - **Gu Family Book** †; **Kim Woo-bin** - **School 2013** †; Lee Sang-yeob - Jang Ok-jung, Living by Love; Oh Chang-seok - Princess Aurora; Park Seo-joon - Pots of Gold	**Best New Actress**: **Kim Yoo-ri** - **Cheongdam-dong Alice**, **Master's Sun** †; **Lee Yu-bi** - **Gu Family Book** †; Choi Soo-young - Dating Agency: Cyrano; Ha Yeon-soo - Monstar
**Best Young Actor**: **Chun Bo-geun** - **The Queen's Classroom** †	**Best Young Actress**: **Kim Hyang-gi** - **The Queen's Classroom** †
**Best Production Director**: **Kim Byung-soo** - **Nine** †	**Best Writer**: **So Hyun-kyung** - **Seoyoung, My Daughter**, **Two Weeks** †
**Popular Star Award, Actor**: **Ju Ji-hoon** - **Five Fingers** †	**Popular Star Award, Actress**: **Oh Yeon-seo** - **Here Comes Mr. Oh** †
**Best Couple Award**: **Lee Jong-suk** and **Lee Bo-young** - **I Can Hear Your Voice** †	**Best Performance**: **Jung Eun-ji** - **That Winter, the Wind Blows** †
**Best Original Soundtrack**: **"Winter Love" (The One)** - **That Winter, the Wind Blows** †	**Best Action**: **Gu Family Book** †
**Best Dressed**: **Yeon Jung-hoon** - **Pots of Gold** †; **Yoo In-young** - **Wonderful Mama** †	**Best Manager**: **Kim Dong-eop, Will Entertainment** †
