= Choi Yoon-young =

South Korean actress

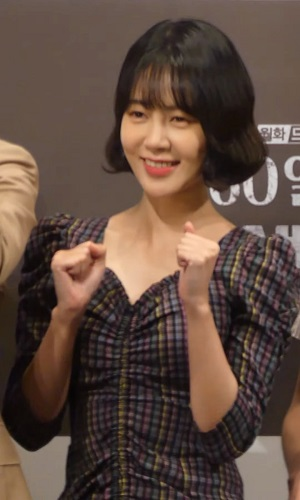
- Choi in 2019
- Born: September 25, 1986 (age 40); Seoul, South Korea
- Education: Dankook University
- Occupation: Actress
- Years active: 2009–present
- Agent: Billions

Korean name
- Hangul: 최윤영
- Hanja: 崔允英
- RR: Choe Yunyeong
- MR: Ch'oe Yunyŏng

Choi Yoon-young (Korean: 최윤영; born September 25, 1986) is a South Korean actress. She has notable roles in Seoyoung, My Daughter, Passionate Love, My Dear Cat and Designated Survivor: 60 Days among other works.

== Career ==
After passing the 21st KBS actors' auditions in 2008, Choi began playing supporting roles in television series, notably in Bread, Love and Dreams (2010) and Seoyoung, My Daughter (2012). She then appeared twice on the big screen in 2012: in the short film "Endless Flight" in omnibus Horror Stories, and the table tennis sports film As One.

In 2013, Choi played her first leading role in the four-episode romantic comedy series Like a Fairytale, followed by The Greatest Thing in the World (a Chuseok special on single mothers and adoptees) and the melodrama Passionate Love.

In recent years, Choi became known among Korean telenovela audiences, having acted as the protagonist in several titles of the genre such as Enemies From the Past, All is Well, and My Dear Cat.

Choi made a comeback to weekly miniseries in 2019 with tvN's political thriller Designated Survivor: 60 Days, based on the American television series of the same title, in which she played the counterpart of Italia Ricci's role.

In August 2021, Choi signed with new agency IOK Company.

== Filmography ==
=== Film ===
Year	Title	Role	Notes	Ref.
2011	Little Black Dress	Kim Young-mi		
2012	As One	Choi Yeon-jung		
2012	Horror Stories Endless Flight	So-Jung	Short film	
2013	Couple Ring		Short film	
2014	You Are My Vampire	Gyu-Jung		
2019	0.0 MHz	Yoon-Jung		

=== Television series ===
Year	Title	Role	Ref.
2009	The Accidental Couple	Stylist	
2009	The Slingshot		
2009	He Who Can't Marry	Yoo Soo-young	
2009	Hot Blood		
2009	Invincible Lee Pyung Kang	Bong So-hee	
2010	Bread, Love and Dreams	Gu Ja-rim	
2010–2011	Queen of Reversals	Ki-ppeum	
2012–2013	Seoyoung, My Daughter	Choi Ho-jung	
2013	KBS Drama Special: "Like a Fairytale"	Baek Jang-Mi	
2013	The Queen's Classroom	Yang Min-hee	
2013	The Greatest Thing in the World	Woo-Sun	
2013–2014	Passionate Love	Han Yoo-jung	
2014	My Dear Cat	Go Yang-soon	
2015	All is Well	Geum Ga-Eun	
2017–2018	Enemies From the Past	Choi Go-ya	
2019	Designated Survivor: 60 Days	Jung Soo-jung	
2020	The Uncanny Counter	Kim Jeong-yeong	
2023	Woman in a Veil	Oh Se-rin	
2024	Love Song for Illusion	Eun Mi-so	
2025	For Eagle Brothers	Na Young-eun	

=== Television show ===
Year	Title	Role	Notes	Ref.
2022	Goal Girl	Cast Member	Season 2	
2022	Dating is Straight	Host		

== Theater ==
Year	Title	Role	Ref.
2003	Forest Fire (Korean: 산불; RR: Sanbul)		
2007	Three Sisters		
2008	Proof		
2008	Woyzeck		
2023	Café Juenes	Choi Jeong-sik	

== Awards and nominations ==
Year	Award	Category	Nominated work	Result
2012	KBS Drama Awards	Best New Actress	Seoyoung, My Daughter	Nominated
2013	49th Baeksang Arts Awards	Best New Actress (TV)	Seoyoung, My Daughter	Nominated
2013	13th Gwangju International Film Festival Drama Awards	New Star Award		Won
2014	KBS Drama Awards	Excellence Award, Actress in a Daily Drama	My Dear Cat	Won
