= Our Golden Days =

2025 South Korean television series

- Promotional poster
- Hangul: 화려한 날들
- Lit.: Gorgeous days
- RR: Hwaryeohan naldeul
- MR: Hwaryŏhan naldŭl
- Genre: Family drama Melodrama; Romance
- Written by: So Hyun-kyung
- Directed by: Kim Hyung-seok
- Starring: Jung Il-woo; Jung In-sun; Yoon Hyun-min
- Music by: Kim Ji-soo (CP)
- Opening theme: "Our Golden Days" by Park Min-jin
- Country of origin: South Korea
- Original language: Korean
- No. of episodes: 50

Production
- Executive producers: Kim Shin-il; Lee Ho
- Running time: 70 minutes
- Production companies: Studio Coming Soon; Studio Bom; Monster Union

Original release
- Network: KBS2
- Release: August 9, 2025 – January 25, 2026

Our Golden Days (Korean: 화려한 날들) is a 2025–26 South Korean television series directed by Kim Hyung-seok and starring Jung Il-woo, Jung In-sun and Yoon Hyun-min. Written by So Hyun-kyung, it tells the story of older and new generations who discover the true meaning of family by learning to understand and share each other's pain. It premiered on KBS2 on August 9, 2025, and aired every Saturday and Sunday at 20:00 (KST).

The series is available for streaming on Viu in Singapore and Hong Kong.

== Cast and characters ==
=== Main ===
- Jung Il-woo as Lee Ji-hyeok

33 years old. SV Team representative of a general construction materials company. He takes the lead in both work and love. He has a tsundere side that is warm-hearted and righteous.

- Jung In-sun as Ji Eun-oh

30 years old. Cafe manager and interior designer. She is a warm-hearted person who lives a life without regrets without losing her passion even in difficult circumstances.

- Yoon Hyun-min as Park Sung-jae

33 years old. 3rd Generation Chaebol. A close friend of Lee Ji-hyeok, he is perfect in appearance, personality, ability, and family.

=== Supporting ===
Lee Ji-hyeok's family

- Chun Ho-jin as Lee Sang-cheol

61 years old. Retired as a manager at a mid-sized textile company. Father of three siblings Ji-hyeok, Ji-wan, and Soo-bin, son of Ok-rye, husband of Da-jeong, and son-in-law of Jang-soo. An honest person, who worked hard to support his parents and family even in difficult circumstances.

- Ban Hyo-jung as Jo Ok-rye

88 years old. Lee Sang-cheol's mother, Da-jeong's mother-in-law, and the paternal grandmother of Ji-hyeok, Ji-wan, and Soo-bin.

- Kim Hee-jung as Kim Da-jeong

58 years old. Lee Sang-cheol's wife, mother of Ji-hyeok, Ji-wan, and Soo-bin, daughter-in-law of Ok-rye, and daughter of Jang-su.

- Yoon Joo-sang as Kim Jang-soo

87 years old. Jo Ok-rye's maternal cousin and Da-jeong's father. He lost his wife who suffered from dementia.

- Shin Su-hyun as Lee Soo-bin

24 years old. Fashion creator. Younger sister of Lee Ji-hyeok and the youngest daughter of Lee Sang-cheol

- Son Sang-yeon as Lee Ji-wan

30 years old. Ji-hyeok's younger brother and Sang-cheol's second son.

Ji Eun-oh's family

- Kim Jung-young as Jeong Soon-hee

65 years old, running a restaurant. Ji Eun-oh and Ji Kang-oh's mother.

- Yang Hyuk as Ji Kang-oh

24 years old. A complainer. Jeong Soon-hee's son and Ji Eun-oh's brother.

Park Sung-jae's family

- Lee Tae-ran as Ko Seong-hee

56 years old. Sung-jae's stepmother, Park Jin-seok's remarried wife.

- Park Sung-geun as Park Jin-seok

65 years old. He is a successful businessman. Seong-hee's second husband and Sung-jae's father.

- Park Jung-yeon as Park Young-ra

25 years old. Painter. Graduate student. Half-sister of Park Sung-jae and the daughter of Ko Sung-hee and Park Jin-seok.

=== Others ===
- Lim Young-joo as Oh Soo-jung

30 years old. Eun-oh's cafe employee. She is from the same club as Eun-oh and is a close friend.

- Kim Woon-kyo as Lee Ha-eun

24 years old. Su-bin's high school friend.

- Go Won-hee as Jeong Bo-ah
- Dokgo Young-jae as Jung Kyung-hwan, Bo-ah's father
- Kim Cheong as Yang Mal-sook, Bo-ah's mother
- Kim Jun-ho as Han Woo-jin

33 years old. Ko Seong-hui's son, a twin.

== Production ==
In March 2025, Jung In-sun was cast in a new weekend drama by director Kim Hyung-seok and writer So Hyun-kyung, the duo behind the 2017 hit weekend drama My Golden Life, which achieved highest average viewership rating of 45%.

Yoon Hyun-min was added to the cast in April 2025 to play a main role. On June 25, photos from the script reading were made public, while two days later, KBS revealed the full cast of the series. Actor Chun Ho-jin is reunited with director Kim and writer So after eight years since My Golden Life. Lee Tae-ran returned to KBS's weekend drama after 12 years since Wang's Family.

== Original soundtrack ==
Our Golden Days

Soundtrack album by Various
- Released: January 25, 2026
- Genre: Soundtrack
- Languages: Korean; English
- Labels: AURORA; Danal Entertainment

=== Part 1 ===
Released on August 7, 2025
No.	Title	Lyrics	Music	Artist	Length
1.	"Shining Like Countless Stars" (별처럼 수없이 빛나는)	Park Jung-jun, Han Jae-wan	Park Jung-jun, Han Jae-wan	Vin	5:02
2.	"Shining Like Countless Stars" (별처럼 수없이 빛나는; Inst.)				5:02
Total length:					10:04

=== Part 2 ===
Released on August 17, 2025
No.	Title	Lyrics	Music	Artist	Length
1.	"Hello"	Lee Jung-woo, Ritz (Won Won-ji), cozy	Lee Jung-woo, Ritz (Won Won-ji), cozy	Yoo Seo-ha	3:24
2.	"Hello" (Inst.)				3:24
Total length:					6:48

=== Part 3 ===
Released on August 23, 2025
No.	Title	Lyrics	Music	Artist	Length
1.	"Somehow"	Park Se-jeong, Hyunji (Joy), ALMOND	Kunyo, NORU	Park Se-jeong	2:16
Total length:					2:16

=== Part 4 ===
Released on August 30, 2025
No.	Title	Lyrics	Music	Artist	Length
1.	"If you come to my side" (그대 내 곁에 와준다면)	Park Jeong-jun, Han Jae-wan	Park Jeong- jun, Han Jae-wan	Jung Il-woo	4:07
2.	"If you come to my side" (Inst.)				4:07
Total length:					8:14

=== Part 5 ===
Released on September 7, 2025
No.	Title	Lyrics	Music	Artist	Length
1.	"Splendid Days" (화려한 날들)	Hwang In-wook, Jeon Tae-ik	Hwang In-wook, Jeon Tae-ik	Hwang In-wook	4:06
2.	"Splendid days" (Inst.)				4:06
Total length:					8:12

=== Part 6 ===
Released on September 14, 2025
No.	Title	Lyrics	Music	Artist	Length
1.	"I think it's you" (그대인가 (어반자카파))	Lee Da-hee	Park Joo-sung, Lee Da-hee	Jo Hyun-ah (Urban Zakapa)	3:58
2.	"I think it's you" (Inst.)				3:58
Total length:					7:56

=== Part 7 ===
Released on September 21, 2025
No.	Title	Lyrics	Music	Artist	Length
1.	"Be With You"	Nanjeong (NJ), melly, Lee So-heun	Nanjeong (NJ)	Choi Sol-ji	3:24
2.	"Be With You" (Inst.)				3:24
Total length:					6:48

=== Part 8 ===
Released on September 27, 2025
No.	Title	Lyrics	Music	Artist	Length
1.	"It was love" (사랑이었다)	E.HEH	E.HEH	E.HEH (understanding)	3:58
2.	"It was love" (Inst.)				3:58
Total length:					7:56

=== Part 9 ===
Released on October 5, 2025
No.	Title	Lyrics	Music	Artist	Length
1.	"To you I" (너에게 난)	awesome	awesome	Gael (Ecobee)	3:48
2.	"To you I" (Inst.)				3:48
Total length:					7:36

=== Part 10 ===
Released on October 12, 2025
No.	Title	Lyrics	Music	Artist	Length
1.	"Say Something (feat. Park Eun-sol)"	Hozee	Hozee	Hozee	3:11
2.	"Say Something" (Inst.)				3:11
Total length:					6:22

=== Part 11 ===
Released on October 26, 2025
No.	Title	Lyrics	Music	Artist	Length
1.	"Sweetly" (달콤하게)	J.seph, Lsound	Lee Jong-soo, Landscape	Huh Chan-mi, J.seph	2:42
2.	"Sweetly" (Inst.)				2:42
Total length:					5:24

=== Part 12 ===
Released on November 9, 2025
No.	Title	Lyrics	Music	Artist	Length
1.	"Amazing" (놀라워)	Park Se-jeong, Kunyo, Park Ji-hyun, Hyunji (JOY), Choi Shin-jae, ALMOND	Park Se-jeong, Kunyo Arranged by Kunyo, Noh Kyung-hwan, Kim Seung-mo, Park Se-jeong, Kang Hye-ryeong, Lee Tae-woo , Yoo Jae-hoon, NORU (노루), Bliss7	Chocolate and Vanilla	2:20
2.	"Amazing" (Inst.)				2:20
Total length:					4:40

=== Part 13 ===
Released on November 16, 2025
No.	Title	Lyrics	Music	Artist	Length
1.	"You're cute, I like you, I love you so much" (귀여워 좋아해 많이 사랑해 블러셔)	Blusher	Blusher, Jang Seok-won	Blusher	2:47
2.	"You're cute, I like you, I love you so much" (Inst.)				2:47
Total length:					5:34

=== Part 14 ===
Released on November 23, 2025
No.	Title	Lyrics	Music	Artist	Length
1.	"Like a butterfly" (나비처럼)	Guarin, Kim Seong-hyeon, Bliss7	Guarin, Kim Seong-hyeon	Lee Byung-jun	3:02
2.	"Like a butterfly" (Inst.)				3:02
Total length:					6:04

=== Part 15 ===
Released on November 30, 2025
No.	Title	Lyrics	Music	Artist	Length
1.	"Yeah, that's what I wanted to say" (그래 이 말 하고 싶었어)	Guarin, Kim Seong-hyeon, Bliss7	Guarin, Kim Seong-hyeon	Kwon Jun	2:32
2.	"Yeah, that's what I wanted to say" (Inst.)				2:32
Total length:					4:64

=== Part 16 ===
Released on December 7, 2025
No.	Title	Lyrics	Music	Artist	Length
1.	"Something that doesn't change with time" (시간이 흘러도 변하지 않는)	awesome	awesome	Brothers	3:35

=== Part 17 ===
Released on December 13, 2025
No.	Title	Lyrics	Music	Artist	Length
1.	"You and me" (너랑 나 리채)	Gu A-rin, Kim Sung-hyun, bliss7	Gu A-rin, Kim Sung-hyun	Leechae	3:36
2.	"You and me" (Inst.)				3:36

=== Part 18 ===
Released on December 14, 2025
No.	Title	Lyrics	Music	Artist	Length
1.	"In the end we" (끝내 우리는)	awesome	awesome	SOTK	4:05

=== Part 19 ===
Released on December 20, 2025
No.	Title	Lyrics	Music	Artist	Length
1.	"I'll hold your shining hand" (빛나는 너의 손 잡아볼게)	Gu A-rin, Kim Seong-hyun, Bliss7	Gu A-rin, Kim Seong-hyun	Lim Se-min	3:26
2.	"I'll hold your shining hand" (Inst.)				3:26
Total length:					6:52

=== Part 20 ===
Released on December 21, 2025
No.	Title	Lyrics	Music	Artist	Length
1.	"Coffee"	BILDUP(4MAKERS)	Still(4MAKERS), BILDUP(4MAKERS)	OmyuO	3:52
2.	"Coffee" (Inst.)				3:52
Total length:					7:44

=== Part 21 ===
Released on December 27, 2025
No.	Title	Lyrics	Music	Artist	Length
1.	"Little Star in the Night Sky" (밤하늘 작은별)	Lee Jong-soo, Na Byung-soo	Lee Jong-soo, Na Byung-soo	Seung Chae-rin	3:04
2.	"Little Star in the Night Sky" (Inst.)				3:04
Total length:					6:08

=== Part 22 ===
Released on December 28, 2025
No.	Title	Lyrics	Music	Artist	Length
1.	"I guess I like it more" (내가 더 많이 좋아하나 봐)	Pilseungbulpae, Ahn Sol-hee	Pilseungbulpae, Ahn Sol-hee, Meteor	It's Heeju	3:25
2.	"I guess I like it more" (Inst.)				3:25
Total length:					6:50

=== Part 23 ===
Released on January 4, 2026
No.	Title	Lyrics	Music	Artist	Length
1.	"Become a bigger person" (더 큰 사람이 되어)	Park Kwang-sun, hon (Hon)	Kim Ji-soo	Park Kwang-sun	3:18

=== Part 24 ===
Released on January 11, 2026
No.	Title	Lyrics	Music	Artist	Length
1.	"You are everything"	Choi Go-rae	Choi Go-rae	Kim Jung-yeon	3:45

=== Part 25 ===
Released on January 17, 2026
No.	Title	Lyrics	Music	Artist	Length
1.	"You too, like me" (그대도 나처럼)	Choi Go-rae	Choi Go-rae	Felic (Felic)	3:59
2.	"You too, like me" (Inst.)				3:59

=== Part 26 ===
Released on January 18, 2026
No.	Title	Lyrics	Music	Artist	Length
1.	"Your world is" (너의 세상은)	Lee Jong-su, Landscape	Lee Jong-su, Landscape	Han Jun-beom	3:35
2.	"Your world is" (Inst.)				3:35

=== Part 27 ===
Released on January 25, 2026
No.	Title	Lyrics	Music	Artist	Length
1.	"Last gift" (마지막 선물)	awesome	awesome	Gridway	3:06

== Release and reception ==
The premiere date was revealed on July 1, 2025 with the release of a teaser poster. The first episode was broadcast on KBS2 on August 9, 2025. It opened with an average TV viewership rating of 13.9% nationwide, which is lower than the first episode of its predecessor For Eagle Brothers, which opened at 15.5% and closed at 20.4% for its final episode. It achieved nationwide rating of 20.5% for its finale episode on January 25, 2026, which was the highest viewership ratings for the series.

== Viewership ==
Our Golden Days : South Korea viewers per episode (millions)

Episodes	Episode number									
Episodes	1	2	3	4	5	6	7	8	9	10
1–10	2.568	2.535	2.324	2.581	2.480	2.882	2.514	2.999	2.685	2.750
11–20	2.632	2.998	2.442	2.916	2.526	2.857	2.488	2.349	2.523	2.783
21–30	2.444	2.763	2.508	2.796	2.523	2.766	2.363	2.722	2.448	2.747
31–40	2.891	3.176	2.813	3.222	2.902	3.203	3.157	3.326	2.981	3.369
41–50	3.051	3.564	3.320	3.572	3.290	3.511	3.236	3.642	3.428	3.677

Source: Audience measurement performed nationwide by Nielsen Korea.

Average TV viewership ratings
Ep.	Original broadcast date	Average audience share (Nielsen Korea)	
Ep.	Original broadcast date	Nationwide	Seoul
1	August 9, 2025	13.9% (1st)	12.5% (1st)
2	August 10, 2025	13.4% (1st)	11.5% (1st)
3	August 16, 2025	12.6% (1st)	11.4% (1st)
4	August 17, 2025	13.8% (1st)	12.0% (1st)
5	August 23, 2025	13.2% (1st)	11.9% (1st)
6	August 24, 2025	15.6% (1st)	14.1% (1st)
7	August 30, 2025	13.7% (1st)	12.4% (1st)
8	August 31, 2025	15.9% (1st)	14.5% (1st)
9	September 6, 2025	14.5% (1st)	13.3% (1st)
10	September 7, 2025	14.8% (1st)	13.5% (1st)
11	September 13, 2025	14.1% (1st)	13.1% (1st)
12	September 14, 2025	15.7% (1st)	14.1% (1st)
13	September 20, 2025	13.9% (1st)	13.1% (1st)
14	September 21, 2025	15.8% (1st)	14.3% (1st)
15	September 27, 2025	13.7% (1st)	12.5% (1st)
16	September 28, 2025	15.3% (1st)	14.1% (1st)
17	October 4, 2025	13.3% (1st)	12.3% (1st)
18	October 5, 2025	12.2% (1st)	11.3% (1st)
19	October 11, 2025	13.5% (1st)	13.0% (1st)
20	October 12, 2025	15.0% (1st)	13.2% (1st)
21	October 18, 2025	13.1% (1st)	12.1% (1st)
22	October 19, 2025	15.2% (1st)	13.7% (1st)
23	October 25, 2025	13.7% (1st)	12.2% (1st)
24	October 26, 2025	14.9% (1st)	13.1% (1st)
25	November 1, 2025	13.6% (1st)	12.3% (1st)
26	November 2, 2025	14.8% (1st)	13.4% (1st)
27	November 8, 2025	13.5% (1st)	12.2% (1st)
28	November 9, 2025	14.9% (1st)	13.7% (1st)
29	November 15, 2025	13.2% (1st)	12.6% (1st)
30	November 16, 2025	14.9% (1st)	13.7% (1st)
31	November 22, 2025	16.0% (1st)	14.6% (1st)
32	November 23, 2025	16.8% (1st)	14.8% (1st)
33	November 29, 2025	15.1% (1st)	13.8% (1st)
34	November 30, 2025	17.4% (1st)	15.7% (1st)
35	December 6, 2025	15.5% (1st)	14.5% (1st)
36	December 7, 2025	16.9% (1st)	15.7% (1st)
37	December 13, 2025	16.6% (1st)	15.5% (1st)
38	December 14, 2025	17.5% (1st)	16.1% (1st)
39	December 20, 2025	16.6% (1st)	14.9% (1st)
40	December 21, 2025	18.1% (1st)	16.7% (1st)
41	December 27, 2025	17.1% (1st)	15.5% (1st)
42	December 28, 2025	19.0% (1st)	18.3% (1st)
43	January 3, 2026	17.7% (1st)	17.0% (1st)
44	January 4, 2026	19.1% (1st)	17.6% (1st)
45	January 10, 2026	17.5% (1st)	16.3% (1st)
46	January 11, 2026	18.9% (1st)	17.6% (1st)
47	January 17, 2026	17.4% (1st)	16.6% (1st)
48	January 18, 2026	19.6% (1st)	18.1% (1st)
49	January 24, 2026	18.4% (1st)	17.5% (1st)
50	January 25, 2026	20.5% (1st)	19.2% (1st)
Average		15.6%	14.3%
In the table above, the blue numbers represent the lowest ratings and the red numbers represent the highest ratings.

== Accolades ==
Award	Year	Category	Recipient(s)	Result	Ref.
APAN Star Awards	2025	Top Excellence Award, Actor in a Serial Drama	Jung Il-woo	Nominated	
APAN Star Awards	2025	Excellence Award, Actor in a Serial Drama	Yoon Hyun-min	Nominated	
APAN Star Awards	2025	Excellence Award, Actress in a Serial Drama	Lee Tae-ran	Nominated	
APAN Star Awards	2025	Excellence Award, Actress in a Serial Drama	Jung In-sun	Nominated	
KBS Drama Awards	2025	Best New Actress Award	Park Jung-yeon	Won	
KBS Drama Awards	2025	Best Excellence Award (Female)	Lee Tae-ran	Won	
KBS Drama Awards	2025	Excellence Award (Female Long-Room Drama)	Jung In-sun	Won	
KBS Drama Awards	2025	Excellence Award (Male Long-Room Drama)	Jung Il-woo	Won	
