= 2025 KBS Drama Awards =

39th edition of award ceremony

- Official logo
- Date: December 31, 2025
- Site: KBS Hall, Yeouido, Seoul
- Hosted by: Jang Sung-kyu; Nam Ji-hyun; Moon Sang-min
- Official website: KBS Drama Awards

Highlights
- Grand Prize (Daesang): Ahn Jae-wook and Uhm Ji-won – For Eagle Brothers

Television coverage
- Network: KBS2
- Viewership: Ratings: 5%; Viewership: 985,000

The 2025 KBS Drama Awards (Korean: 2025 KBS 연기대상; Hanja: 2025 KBS 演技大賞), presented by Korean Broadcasting System (KBS), was held on December 31, 2025, from 19:10 (KST) at KBS Hall in Yeouido, Seoul. Jang Sung-kyu in his third consecutive year with Nam Ji-hyun, a South Korean actress, and Moon Sang-min, a South Korean actor and model hosted the award show.

== Winners and nominees ==
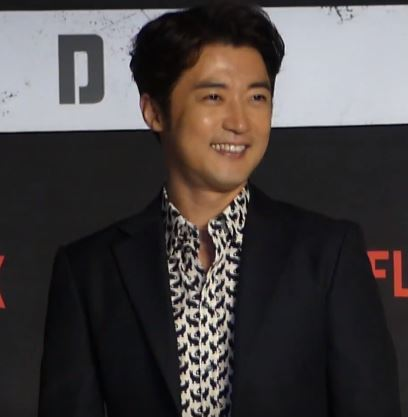
Ahn Jae-wook

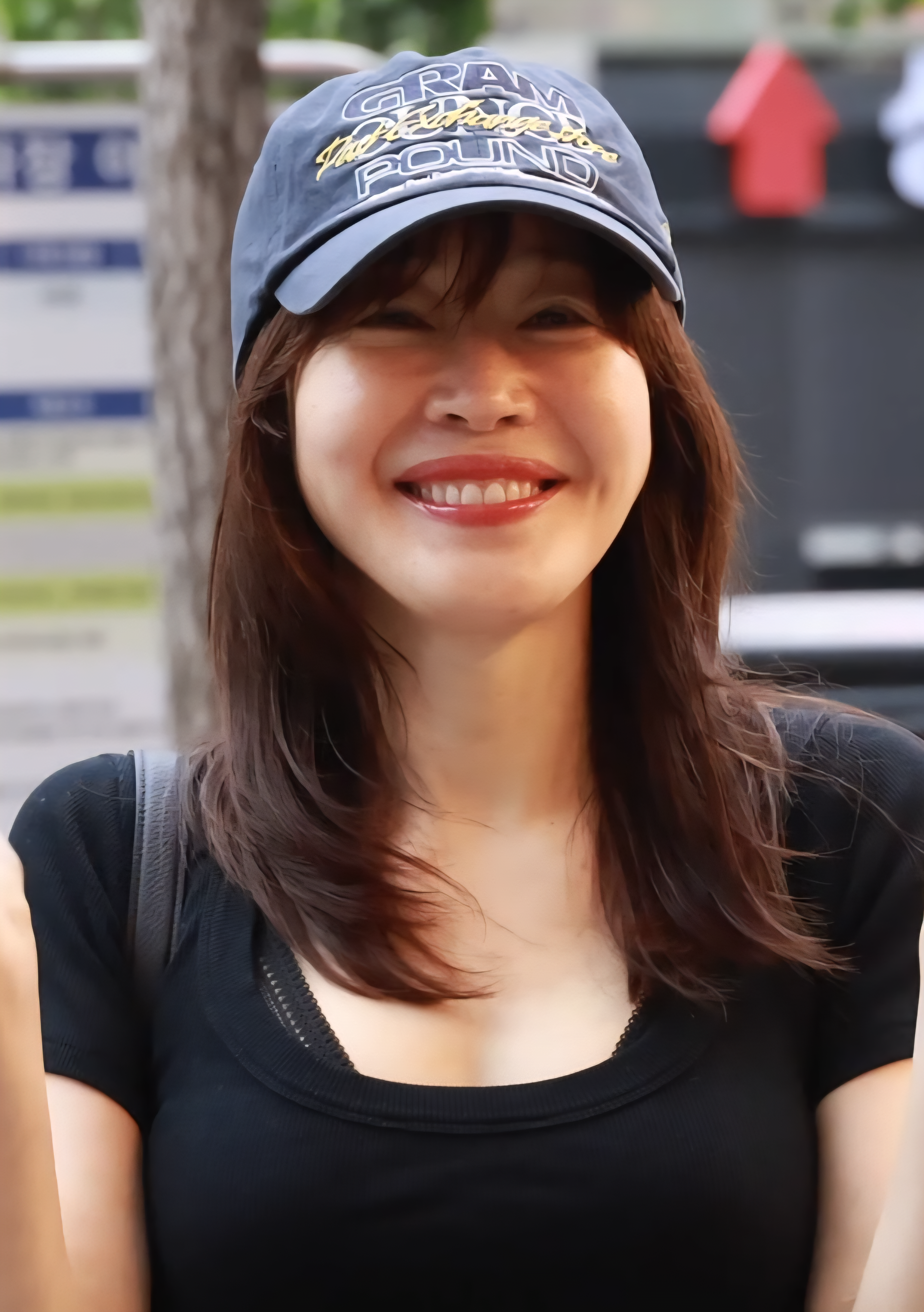
Uhm Ji-won

Winners of Grand Prize (Daesang)

Winners are listed first and denoted in bold.

Grand Prize (Daesang)
**Ahn Jae-wook and Uhm Ji-won – For Eagle Brothers**; Chun Ho-jin – Our Golden Days; Kim Young-kwang – Walking on Thin Ice; Lee Tae-ran – Our Golden Days; Lee Young-ae – Walking on Thin Ice; Na Young-hee – Cinderella Game
Top Excellence Award, Actor	Top Excellence Award, Actress
**Kim Young-kwang – Walking on Thin Ice**; Ahn Jae-wook – For Eagle Brothers; Chun Ho-jin – Our Golden Days; Jung Il-woo – Our Golden Days; Lee Jun-young – Pump Up the Healthy Love; Ma Dong-seok – Twelve; Ok Taec-yeon – The First Night with the Duke	**Lee Tae-ran – Our Golden Days**; **Lee Young-ae – Walking on Thin Ice**
Excellence Award, Actor in a Miniseries	Excellence Award, Actress in a Miniseries
**Lee Jun-young** – **Pump Up the Healthy Love**; **Ok Taec-yeon** – **The First Night with the Duke**	**Jung Ji-so** – **Who Is She**; **Seohyun** – **The First Night with the Duke**
Excellence Award, Actor in a Serial Drama	Excellence Award, Actress in a Serial Drama
**Jung Il-woo** – **Our Golden Days**; **Yoon Park** – **For Eagle Brothers**	**Jung In-sun** – **Our Golden Days**; **Yoo In-young** – **For Eagle Brothers**
Excellence Award, Actor in a Daily Drama	Excellence Award, Actress in a Daily Drama
**Park Sang-myun** – **Good Luck!**; **Park Yoon-jae** – **Queen's House**	**Hahm Eun-jung** – **Queen's House**
Best Actor in Drama Special/TV Cinema	Best Actress in Drama Special/TV Cinema
**Yang Dae-hyuk** – **Love Track: Love Hotel**	**Kim Ah-young** – **Love Track: Love Hotel**
Best Supporting Actor	Best Supporting Actress
**Kim Dong-wan** – **For Eagle Brothers**	**Park Joon-geum** – **For Eagle Brothers**
Best New Actor	Best New Actress
**Lee Seok-gi** – **For Eagle Brothers**	**Park Jung-yeon** – **Our Golden Days**; **Shin Seul-ki** – **For Eagle Brothers**
Best Young Actor	Best Young Actress
**Kim Gun-woo – Cinderella Game**	**Kim Si-a – Walking on Thin Ice**
Popularity Award, Actor	Popularity Award, Actress
**Lee Jun-young** – **Pump Up the Healthy Love**	**Jung Eun-ji** – **Pump Up the Healthy Love**
Best Couple Award	Scriptwriter Award
**Ahn Jae-wook and Uhm Ji-won** – **For Eagle Brothers**; **Ha Seung-ri and Hyun Woo** – **Marie and Her Three Daddies**; **Jung Eun-ji and Lee Jun-young** – **Pump Up the Healthy Love**; **Jung Il-woo and Jung In-sun** – **Our Golden Days**; **Kim Young-kwang and Lee Young-ae** – **Walking on Thin Ice**; **Lee Bom and Yoon Park** – **For Eagle Brothers**; **Ok Taec-yeon and Seohyun** – **The First Night with the Duke**	**Goo Hyun-sook** – **For Eagle Brothers**

== See also ==
- 2025 MBC Drama Awards
- 2025 SBS Drama Awards
