= Lee Hye-in =

Lee Hye-in may refer to:

- Lee Hye-in (fencer) (born 1995), South Korean fencer
- Lee Hye-in (actress) (born 1995), South Korean actress
- Hyein (Lee Hye-in, born 2008), South Korean singer, member of girl group NewJeans
