= Jung Il-woo =

South Korean actor

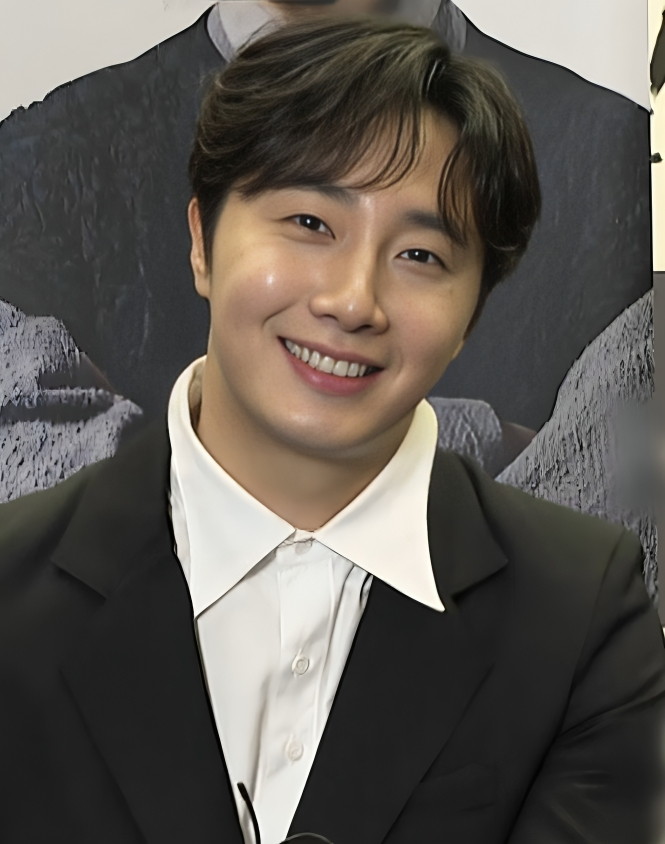
- Jung in May 2021
- Born: 9 September 1987 (age 39); Seoul, South Korea
- Education: Hanyang University
- Occupations: Actor; TV host
- Years active: 2006–present
- Agent: j1-inc.com

Korean name
- Hangul: 정일우
- Hanja: 丁一宇
- RR: Jeong Ilu
- MR: Chŏng Iru
- Website: jungilwoo.com

Jung Il-woo (Korean: 정일우; born 9 September 1987) is a South Korean actor. He is best known for his roles in the sitcom Unstoppable High Kick (2006), and the television dramas The Return of Iljimae (2009), 49 Days (2011), Cool Guys, Hot Ramen (2011), Moon Embracing the Sun (2012), and Cinderella with Four Knights (2016).

== Early life ==
The son of a former television news anchorman, Jung Il-woo studied Broadcasting at the Seoul Institute of the Arts, then later dropped out and transferred to the Theater and Film department of Hanyang University, graduating on 20 February 2014.

== Career ==
=== 2006–2010: Beginnings and rising popularity ===
Jung made his acting debut in 2006 with a minor role in the thriller The World of Silence, but he first rose to fame playing a rebellious teen and motorcycle fanatic with a crush on his teacher in daytime family sitcom Unstoppable High Kick. He then joined the ensemble cast of 2007 romantic comedy film My Love.

In 2009, Jung starred in his first leading role as a young warrior battling injustice in historical drama The Return of Iljimae. This was followed by a supporting role in romantic comedy My Fair Lady, as an idealistic, upper-class lawyer. He further challenged himself when he made his stage debut in 2010 as an HIV-positive gay man in the sold-out play Beautiful Sunday, written by Japanese playwright Mayumi Nakatani.

=== 2011–present: Breakout and overseas popularity ===
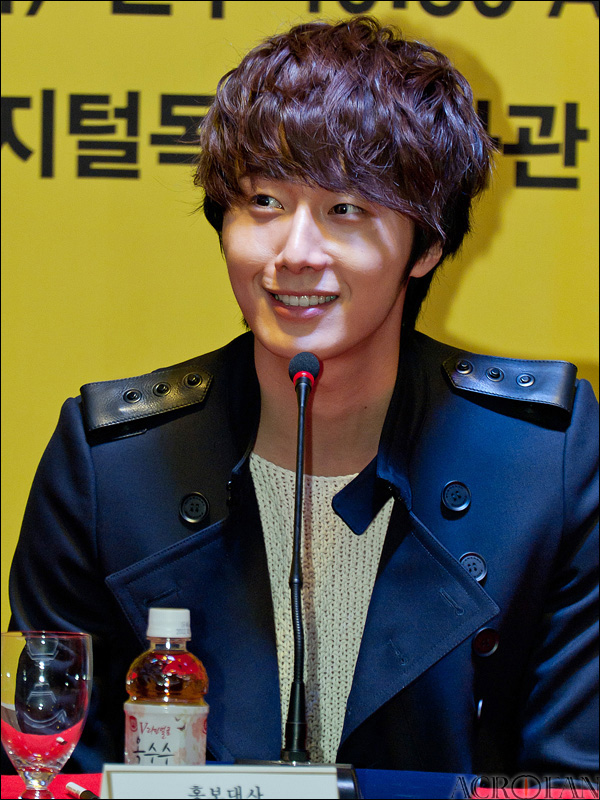
Jung in 2011

Jung's breakout role was in 2011 tearjerker 49 Days, in which he portrayed the Scheduler, a witty modern-day Grim Reaper. His popularity increased with his leading man turn in 2011 cable romantic comedy Cool Guys, Hot Ramen, in which he played an arrogant, immature yet lovable chaebol heir. A supporting role in hit 2012 historical drama Moon Embracing the Sun followed; Jung played a prince who becomes his half-brother's rival in love and for the throne.

Following the success of Cool Guys, Hot Ramen and Moon Embracing the Sun, Jung was launched to stardom as a Hallyu star. He won the Asia Male Actor award at Beijing's Huading Awards, the first non-Chinese entertainer to be nominated at the awards show since it began in 2005.

From 2013 to 2014, he played a prosecutor who falls in love with a girl from a family of orphans in Golden Rainbow. This was followed by a leading role as a prince turned ghost-seeing night watchman who patrols the palace after curfew and keeps the king and his citizens safe, in the supernatural period drama Diary of a Night Watchman.

In 2015, Jung starred in the Korean-Chinese web drama High-End Crush opposite Jin Se-yeon. In less than a month, the drama series recorded over 200 million views. Jung then starred in the Chinese romantic comedy film Rise of a Tomboy, where he plays the CEO of an IT firm who helps a girl develop a love formula for a mobile app.

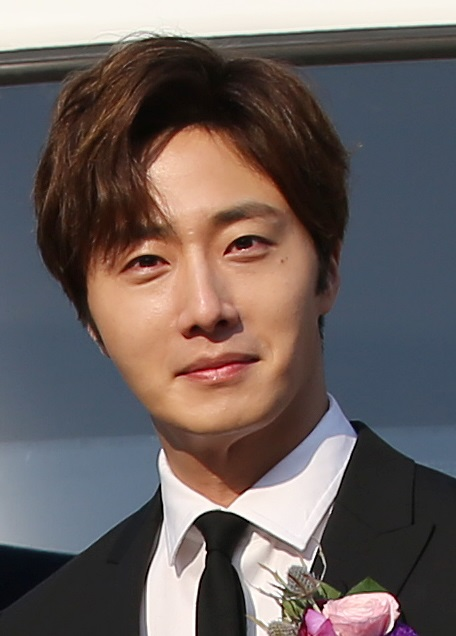
Jung in 2016

In January 2016, Jung signed with a new management agency, HB Entertainment. Jung made his return to Korean television in tvN's romantic comedy Cinderella with Four Knights, playing a lonely and wild-child rebel who is not yet used to being a member of a rich family, having lived most of his life as an orphan.

In 2017, Jung starred in Gon Rak Game Ma Ya (also known as Love and Lies), making him the first Korean actor to land a leading role in a Thailand drama. The drama emerged as a local sensation, and led to a rise of popularity for Jung in the country.

In 2019, Jung starred in the historical action drama Haechi. This marks his first project after enlistment.

In 2021, Jung played the lead role in the MBN historical drama Bossam: Steal the Fate.

In 2022, Jung joins the ENA drama Good Job, which is the second reunion with Kwon Yu-ri, and returns to the big screen with the film Highway Family, which is slated for release in November.

In February 2023, he attended the Milan Fashion Week 2023 FW collection Onitsuka Tiger fashion show.

== Personal life ==
Jung is close friends with fellow actors Lee Min-ho and Kim Bum. Jung is a practicing Roman Catholic.

=== Car accident ===
In August 2006, Jung sustained injuries in a serious car accident while riding in the back of a car with childhood friend and fellow actor Lee Min-ho, who was badly injured in the accident. Their two friends riding in the front of the car did not survive. Jung was left with partial memory loss, causing him to forget parts of his past. He notes that he remembers things, such as people's faces, but not necessarily where they met, and therefore uses photographs to help him remember.

=== Military enlistment ===
In November 2016, he was diagnosed with a cerebral aneurysm. Although this would have exempted him from his mandatory military service, Jung enlisted in December 2016. Jung was discharged on November 30, 2018.

On February 3, 2022, it was confirmed that Jung tested positive for COVID-19, while he had finished the third dose of the vaccine. Jung was contacted by a staff member after filming for SNL Korea Season 2 on January 30 to 31, 2022.

== Filmography ==
=== Film ===
Feature film performances(s)
Year	Title		Role	Notes	Ref.
Year	English	Korean	Role	Notes	Ref.
2006	The World of Silence	조용한 세상	young Ryu Jung-ho		
2007	My Love	내사랑	Ji-woo		
2016	The Rise of a Tomboy	女汉子真爱公式	Ge Yang	Chinese Film	
2018	The Discloser	1급기밀	Kang Young-woo	Cameo	
2022	Highway Family	고속도로 가족	Ki-woo		
2025	Leaving Mom	엄마를 버리러 갑니다	young Jeong-min	Vietnamese-Korean film	
2027	The Final Bullet			Vietnamese-Korean film	

=== Television series ===
Television drama performances(s)
Year	Title		Role	Notes	Ref.
Year	English	Korean	Role	Notes	Ref.
2006–2007	High Kick!	거침없이 하이킥	Lee Yoon-ho		
2008	The Secret of Coocoo Island	크크섬의 비밀	Lee Yoon-ho	Cameo (episode 1)	
2009	The Return of Iljimae	돌아온 일지매	Iljimae		
2009	My Fair Lady	아가씨를 부탁해	Lee Tae-yoon		
2009	High Kick Through the Roof	지붕 뚫고 하이킥	Il-woo	Cameo (episode 35)	
2011	49 Days	49일	Scheduler / Song Yi-soo		
2011	Cool Guys, Hot Ramen	꽃미남 라면가게	Cha Chi-soo		
2011	High Kick: Revenge of the Short Legged	하이킥! : 짧은 다리의 역습	Il-woo	Cameo (episode 40)	
2012	Moon Embracing the Sun	해를 품은 달	Prince Yang-myung		
2013	The Queen of Office	직장의 신	Cha Chi-soo	Cameo (episode 3)	
2013–2014	Golden Rainbow	황금 무지개	Seo Do-young		
2014	Diary of a Night Watchman	야경꾼일지	Lee Rin		
2016	Cinderella with Four Knights	신데렐라와 네 명의 기사	Kang Ji-woon		
2017	Love and Lies	กลรักเกมมายา	Tim	Thai drama	
2019	Haechi	해치	Prince Lee Geum		
2020	Sweet Munchies	야식남녀	Park Jin-sung		
2021	Bossam: Steal the Fate	보쌈-운명을 훔치다	Ba Woo		
2022	Good Job	굿잡	Eun Seon-woo		
2025	Our Golden Days	화려한 날들	Lee Ji-hyeok		
TBA	Beautiful Woman	女人花似梦	Kim Moon-ho	Chinese drama	
TBA	The Girls' Lies	恋人的谎言	Lantian	Chinese drama	

=== Web series ===
Web drama series performances(s)
Year	Title		Role	Notes	Ref.
Year	English	Korean	Role	Notes	Ref.
2015	High-End Crush	고품격 짝사랑	Choi Se-hoon	South Korean-Chinese web drama	

=== Television shows ===
Television show performances(s)
Year	Title		Role	Notes	Ref.
Year	English	Korean	Role	Notes	Ref.
2011	One More Time – Jung Il-woo		Main Cast		
2015	Star Chef China	星厨驾到	Cast	Season 2, guest from episode 1–4	
2019–2020	Stars' Top Recipe at Fun-Staurant	신상출시 편스토랑	Cast/chef	Episodes 1–20	
2021	The Village Lover	마을애 가게	Cast Member		

=== Web shows ===
Television show performances(s)
Year	Title		Role	Notes	Ref.
Year	English	Korean	Role	Notes	Ref.
2022	Saturday Night Live Korea	SNL 코리아	Host	Season 2 – Episode 11	

=== Music video appearances ===
Year	Song Title	Artist	Ref.
2007	"This Is Me"	SAT	
2007	"Goodbye Sadness"	Goo Jung-hyun	

=== Hosting ===
Year	Title	Notes	Ref.
2022	8th APAN Star Awards	with Kwon Yu-ri	

== Theater ==
Theater performances(s)
Year	Title		Role	Ref.
Year	English	Korean	Role	Ref.
2010	Beautiful Sunday	뷰티풀 선데이	Lee Joon-seok	
2019	The Elephant Song	엘리펀트송	Michael	
2024	Kiss of the Spider Woman	거미여인의 키스	Molina	

== Discography ==
=== Singles ===
Title	Year	Album
"Guilty" (죽일 놈)	2009	narration for Dynamic Duo song
"Scarecrow" (허수아비)	2011	49 Days OST
"Someone Like You" (너란 사람)	2011	Cool Guys, Hot Ramen OST
"Rain Tears Instead" (차라리 비눈물에) (with Nicole Jung)	2014	Diary of a Night Watchman
"Heartbeat"(심장박동)	2016	The Rise of a Tomboy (女汉子真爱公式)
"My All" (내 모든)	2017	Love & Lies (กลรักเกมมายา) OST
"If You Come by My Side" (내 곁에 오면)	2025	Our Golden Days (화려한 날들) OST

== Social activities ==
Year	Event	Notes
2011	12th Jeonju International Film Festival	Honorary ambassador
2011	Canadian Tourism Commission	Honorary ambassador
2011	TOTO Workshop	Official mentor
2012	4th Japan-Korea Friendship Festival	Korean representative
2016	K Travel Bus	Public Relations ambassador
2018	National Museum of Korea	Public Relations ambassador
2019	Seoul Catholic Social Welfare Association	Ambassador
2019	National Center for Trauma	Ambassador
2023	Korean Red Cross	Promotional Envoy

== Awards and nominations ==
Name of the award ceremony, year presented, category, nominee of the award, and the result of the nomination
Award ceremony	Year	Category	Nominee / Work	Result	Ref.
APAN Star Awards	2022	Popularity Star Award, Actor	Bossam: Steal the Fate	Nominated	
APAN Star Awards	2022	Best Couple	Jung Il-woo (with Kwon Yu-ri); Bossam: Steal the Fate	Nominated	
APAN Star Awards	2025	Top Excellence Award, Actor in a Serial Drama	Our Golden Days	Nominated	
Asia Influence Eastern Awards	2015	Most Celebrated Actor	Jung Il-woo	Won	
Asia Model Awards	2012	Fashionista Award	49 Days, Cool Guys, Hot Ramen	Won	
Asia Model Awards	2016	Asia Special Award, Actor	Jung Il-woo	Won	
Baeksang Arts Awards	2007	Best New Actor – Film	My Love	Nominated	
Baeksang Arts Awards	2012	Most Popular Actor (TV)	Moon Embracing the Sun	Nominated	
Buil Film Awards	2023	Best New Actor	Highway Family	Nominated	
Cosmo Beauty Awards	2014	Forever Young Icon Male Star	Jung Il-woo	Won	
Huading Awards	2012	Asia Male Actor Award	Jung Il-woo	Won	
KBS Drama Awards	2009	Best New Actor	My Fair Lady	Nominated	
KBS Drama Awards	2025	Top Excellence Award, Actor	Our Golden Days	Nominated	
KBS Drama Awards	2025	Excellence Award, Actor in a Serial Drama	Our Golden Days	Won	
KBS Drama Awards	2025	Best Couple Award	Jung Il-woo (with Jung In-sun); Our Golden Days	Won	
KBS Entertainment Awards	2019	Rookie Award in Show & Entertainment	Stars' Top Recipe at Fun-staurant	Won	
Korea Junior Star Awards	2009	Daesang (Grand Prize), TV category	The Return of Iljimae	Won	
MBC Drama Awards	2012	Excellence Award, Actor in a Miniseries	Moon Embracing the Sun	Nominated	
MBC Drama Awards	2012	Popularity Award, Actor	Moon Embracing the Sun	Nominated	
MBC Drama Awards	2013	Excellence Award, Actor in a Special Project Drama	Golden Rainbow	Nominated	
MBC Drama Awards	2014	Top Excellence Award, Actor in a Special Project Drama	Diary of a Night Watchman	Won	
MBC Drama Awards	2014	Popularity Award, Actor	Diary of a Night Watchman	Nominated	
MBC Drama Awards	2014	Best Couple Award	Jung Il-woo (with Ko Sung-hee); Diary of a Night Watchman	Nominated	
MBC Entertainment Awards	2007	Best Male Newcomer in a Comedy/Sitcom	Unstoppable High Kick	Won	
Ministry of Health and Welfare Share Happiness Awards	2012	Recipient	Jung Il-woo	Won	
Mnet KM Music Festival	2007	Best Actor in a Music Video	Goodbye Sadness	Won	
Mnet 20's Choice Awards	2007	New Star Award	Unstoppable High Kick	Won	
Mnet 20's Choice Awards	2007	Drama Star Award	Unstoppable High Kick	Won	
SBS Drama Awards	2019	Producer Award	Haechi	Nominated	
SBS Drama Awards	2019	Top Excellence Award, Actor in a Mid-length Drama	Haechi	Nominated	
SBS Drama Awards	2019	Best Couple Award	Jung Il-woo (with Go Ara); Haechi	Nominated	
Seoul International Drama Awards	2026	Best Actor	Our Golden Days	Pending	
WEIBO GALA - Weibo Cultural Communication Night (Thailand)	2026	Weibo Thailand Film & TV Cultural Communication Artist of the Year	Jung Il-woo	Won	
