= Jung In-sun =

South Korean actress (born 1991)

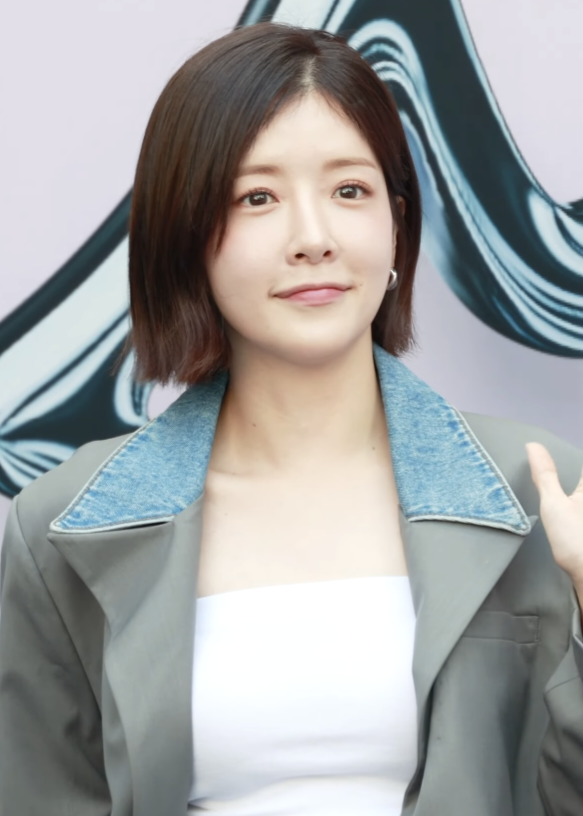
- Jung in September 2024
- Born: April 25, 1991 (age 35); Goyang, South Korea
- Education: Sejong University – Film arts
- Occupation: Actress
- Years active: 1996–present
- Agent: Blitzway Entertainment

Korean name
- Hangul: 정인선
- Hanja: 鄭仁仙
- RR: Jeong Inseon
- MR: Chŏng Insŏn

Jung In-sun (Korean: 정인선; born April 25, 1991) is a South Korean actress.

== Biography ==
Jung started acting in 1996 after she was enrolled in an acting school with her older brother. She landed her first leading role in the 2017 television series Naked Fireman.

== Filmography ==
=== Film ===
Year	Title	Role	Notes	Ref.
2002	The Beauty in Dream	Yoo-mi		
2003	Memories of Murder	Ending girl		
2004	Au Revoir, UFO	young Kyung-woo		
2010	Cafe Noir	Pregnant girl		
2013	Horror Stories 2	Gil Sun-joo		
2014	Han Gong-ju	Eun-hee		
2014	Gyeongju	Jo Hyun-jung		
2016	Open Your Eyes			
2018	Night and Fog in Zona		Special appearance	
2023	My Heart Puppy	Seong-gyeong		

=== Television series ===
Year	Title	Role	Notes	Ref.
1998	Soonpoong Clinic	Lee Semina		
1999	KBS TV Novel: "You"			
2000	Kaist			
2001	On the Flowerbed	Do Ah-ra		
2002	Man in Crisis	Lee Yeo-reum		
2002	Magic Kid Masuri	Han Se-eun		
2002	Man of the Sun, Lee Je-ma	young Goo Woon-young		
2003	Drama City: "I Want To Go Home"		one-act drama	
2003	Jewel in the Palace	Court Lady Boon-yi		
2004	The Age of Heroes	Cheon Tae-sook		
2004	There's Light at the Tip of My Fingernail	Ri Seul-gi		
2008	My Sweet Seoul			
2011	Original Fairytale			
2013	Basketball	Hong Byeo-ri		
2014	12 Years Promise	Kang Ham-cho		
2014	KBS Drama Special: "The Girl Who Became a Photo"	Min Se-young	one-act drama	
2016	Secret Healer	Hae-ran		
2017	Naked Fireman	Han Jin-ah		
2017	Circle	Park Min-young		
2018	Welcome to Waikiki	Han Yoon-ah		
2018	My Secret Terrius	Go Ae-rin		
2019	Psychopath Diary	Shim Bo-kyung		
2021–2022	Let Me Be Your Knight	In Yoon-ju / Kang Seon-joo		
2024	DNA Lover	Han So-jin		
2025	Our Golden Days	Ji Eun-oh		

=== Web series ===
Year	Title	Role	Ref.
2021	How to Be Thirty	Seo Ji-won	

=== Television show ===
Year	Title	Role	Notes	Ref.
2019–2021	Baek Jong-won's Alley Restaurant	Co-host	Episodes 60–168	

=== Music video appearance ===
Year	Title	Singer	Ref.
2019	"Alone" (혼자)	Gummy	

== Ambassadorship ==
- Public Relations Ambassador for the 41st International Contemporary Dance Festival (2022)

== Awards and nominations ==
Name of the award ceremony, year presented, category, nominee of the award, and the result of the nomination
Award ceremony	Year	Category	Nominee / Work	Result	Ref.
Asia Artist Awards	2018	Rising Star Award	Welcome to Waikiki & My Secret Terrius	Won	
KBS Drama Awards	2025	Excellence Award, Actress in a Serial Drama	Our Golden Days	Won	
KBS Drama Awards	2025	Best Couple Award	Jung In-sun (with Jung Il-woo); Our Golden Days	Won	
Korean Contemporary Dancer's Night	2022	Special Achievement Award	Jung In-sun	Won	
MBC Drama Awards	2018	Excellence Award, Actress in a Wednesday-Thursday Drama	My Secret Terrius	Won	
SBS Entertainment Awards	2019	Rookie Award in Female Category	Baek Jong-won's Alley Restaurant	Won	
SBS Entertainment Awards	2020	Excellence Award in Reality Category	Baek Jong-won's Alley Restaurant	Won	
Seoul International Drama Awards	2026	Best Actress	Our Golden Days	Nominated	
