= High-End Crush =

South Korean web series

- High-End Crush Official Poster
- Also known as: Clueless High Class Unrequited Love; The Greatest One-Sided Love No One Has Ever Seen Before
- Genre: Comedy, Romance, Romantic Comedy
- Written by: Sin Yoo-dam
- Directed by: Ji Yeong-soo
- Starring: Jung Il-woo; Jin Se-yeon; Lee Si-eon; Yoon Bo-ra
- Country of origin: South Korea
- Original language: Korean
- No. of episodes: 20

Production
- Executive producers: Kim Kyung-mi; Coco Ma
- Producers: Son Gi-won; Charles Zhang; Deng Ye
- Running time: 15 mins
- Production companies: Kim Jong-hak Production; Sohu

Original release
- Network: NAVER TV Cast, MBN (South Korea); Sohu (China)
- Release: November 14, 2015 – January 17, 2016

High-End Crush

Chinese name
- Traditional Chinese: 高品格單戀
- Simplified Chinese: 高品格单恋
- Hanyu Pinyin: Gāopǐngé Dānliàn

Korean name
- Hangul: 고품격 짝사랑
- Hanja: 高品格 짝사랑
- Revised Romanization: Gopumgyeok Jjaksarang

High-End Crush (Korean: 고품격 짝사랑; Chinese: 高品格单恋) is a South Korean-Chinese production web drama, starring Jung Il-woo and Jin Se-yeon. It was aired on Sohu TV on Saturdays & Sundays at 00:00 (CST). In just four months, the web drama had recorded over 200 million views in China. The series was slated to air for the first time in South Korean television on April 4, 2018, on the generalist pay TV channel MBN.

== Synopsis ==
High End Crush is a romantic comedy depicting the heartfelt and pure love story of a man with everything in his hands who falls in love for the first time in his life with a woman who has been living in completely opposite circumstances from his.

== Cast ==
=== Main cast ===
- Jung Il-woo as Choi Se-hoon
- Jin Se-yeon as Yoo Yi-ryung

=== Supporting cast ===
- Yoon Bo-ra as Kang Min-joo
- Lee Si-eon as Section chief Heo
- Jung Sang-hoon as Jong-hyun
- Moon Se-yoon as Jang Sae-yoon
- Park Hyun-woo as Section chief Park
- Monsta X as themselves
- Soobin as Soo-bin, Min-joo's friend
- Song Won-geun as Yoon Ji-won

=== Guest cast ===
- Kim So-yeon as TV Reporter
- Jung Kyung-ho as TV Reporter
