= Passionate Love (TV series) =

- Promotional poster
- Also known as: Hot Love; Crazy Romance; Madly in Love
- Genre: Romance; Melodrama
- Written by: Park Ye-kyung
- Directed by: Bae Tae-sub
- Starring: Sung Hoon; Choi Yoon-young
- Music by: Choi Jeong-joo
- Country of origin: South Korea
- Original language: Korean
- No. of episodes: 47

Production
- Executive producer: Choi Moon-suk
- Producers: Jo Eun-jung; Lee Hae-kwang
- Production location: South Korea
- Production company: Pan Entertainment

Original release
- Network: SBS TV
- Release: September 28, 2013 – March 23, 2014

Passionate Love (Korean: 열애; Hanja: 熱愛; RR: Yeorae) is a 2013 South Korean weekend television drama series starring Sung Hoon and Choi Yoon-young. It aired on SBS from September 28, 2013 to March 23, 2014 on Saturdays and Sundays at 20:45 for 47 episodes.

== Plot ==
Both handsome and rich, Kang Moo-yeol has it all until the love of his life, Han Yoo-rim, passes away. Yoo-rim's younger sister, Han Yoo-jung also struggles with the loss, forcing her to grow up as an independent person with a no-nonsense attitude. In a twist of fate, these two meet and find that they are linked by more than just the loss of Yoo-rim. Bound by the tragedy of their parents' pasts, these star-crossed lovers will find out if their love alone is strong enough to persevere, or if it really isn't meant to be.

== Cast ==
=== Main characters ===
- Sung Hoon as Kang Moo-yeol
  - Lee Won-keun as young Moo-yeol
- Choi Yoon-young as Han Yoo-jung
  - Lee Hye-in as young Yoo-jung
- Shim Ji-ho as Han Soo-hyuk
  - Yeo Eui-joo as Hong Soo-hyuk
- Jun Kwang-ryul as Kang Moon-do
- Hwang Shin-hye as Hong Nan-cho
- Jeon Mi-seon as Yang Eun-sook

=== Supporting characters ===
People around Moo-yeol

- Joo Hyun as Yang Tae-shin
- Jin Seo-yeon as Kang Moon-hee
- Kang Seo-joon as Park Jong-hyuk
- Yoon Mi-ra as Jang Bok-hee
- Woo Hee-jin as Yang Hye-sook
- Oh Dae-gyu as Yoo Min-soo

People around Yoo-jung

- Seohyun as Han Yoo-rim (ep 1–5)
- Kang Shin-il as Han Sung-bok
- Song Chae-hwan as Song Kyung-hee
- Lee Han-wi as Ban Soo-bong
- Jeon Soo-kyeong as Joo Nam-ok
- Kim Yoon-seo as Ban Dal
- Lee Jung-hyuk as Ban Tae-yang
- Kim Hye-ji as Cha Mi-rae
