= So Hyun-kyung =

South Korean television screenwriter (born 1965)

- Born: 1965 (age 60–61); South Korea
- Occupation: Screenwriter
- Agent: Studio Dragon (2017 - 2024)

Korean name
- Hangul: 소현경
- RR: So Hyeongyeong
- MR: So Hyŏn'gyŏng

So Hyun-kyung (born 1965) is a South Korean television screenwriter. She is best known for writing the TV dramas Brilliant Legacy (2009), Prosecutor Princess (2010), 49 Days (2011), Seoyoung, My Daughter (2012), and Two Weeks (2013).

Career.

== Filmography ==
- Our Golden Days (KBS2 2025)
- Golden Hour (TBA, 2020)
- My Golden Life (KBS2, 2017)
- Second 20s (tvN, 2015)
- Two Weeks (MBC, 2013)
- Seoyoung, My Daughter (KBS2, 2012-2013)
- 49 Days (SBS, 2011)
- Prosecutor Princess (SBS, 2010)
- Brilliant Legacy (SBS, 2009)
- MBC Best Theater "The Taste of Others" (MBC, 2006)
- How Much Love? (MBC, 2006)
- She (SBS, 2005-2006)
- MBC Best Theater "Crying in the Glow of Sunset" (MBC, 2005)
- A Saint and a Witch (MBC, 2003-2004)
- Everyday with You (MBC, 2001-2002)

== Awards ==
- 2013 APAN Star Awards: Best Writer (Seoyoung, My Daughter, Two Weeks)
