= Two Weeks (TV series) =

2013 South Korean television series

- Promotional poster
- Genre: Action; Thriller
- Written by: So Hyun-kyung
- Directed by: Son Hyung-seok; Choi Jung-kyu
- Starring: Lee Joon-gi; Kim So-yeon; Ryu Soo-young; Park Ha-sun; Kim Hye-ok; Jo Min-ki; Lee Chae-mi
- Composers: Oh Seok-joon; Jeon Jong-hyeok
- Country of origin: South Korea
- Original language: Korean
- No. of episodes: 16

Production
- Executive producer: Go Dong-sun
- Producer: Kim Moon-soo
- Cinematography: Choi Jung-gil; Oh Gyu-tae
- Editor: Baek Hae-gyeong
- Production company: JS Pictures

Original release
- Network: MBC TV
- Release: August 7 – September 26, 2013

Two Weeks (Korean: 투윅스) is a 2013 South Korean television series starring Lee Joon-gi, Kim So-yeon, Ryu Soo-young, Park Ha-sun, Kim Hye-ok, Jo Min-ki and Lee Chae-mi. It aired on MBC from August 7 to September 26, 2013 on Wednesdays and Thursdays at 21:55 for 16 episodes.

== Synopsis ==
Jang Tae-san is a small-time gangster who has learned to survive with his fist and wits. He meets and falls in love with a college student, Seo In-hye, who sees a good heart and wounded soul underneath his tough exterior. When In-hye gets pregnant, Tae-san prepares to leave the gangster organization to start a life with her. But he is blackmailed by the gang boss, Moon Il-seok, who wants Tae-san to be his fall guy for an assault charge and go to prison in his place; Il-seok threatens to kill In-hye if Tae-san refuses. So Tae-san tells In-hye to get an abortion and cruelly breaks up with her, then goes off to prison for several years.

Eight years later, Tae-san is running a small pawnshop. One day, In-hye unexpectedly pays him a visit and tells him that she cut ties with her disapproving family and had the baby after all. But her daughter Soo-jin has been diagnosed with leukemia and needs a bone marrow transplant. Since she isn't a match, that leaves Tae-san. Reeling from the discovery that he's a father and wanting to do something good for once in his meaningless life, Tae-san agrees to the undergo the surgery, which is scheduled to take place in two weeks. But he becomes embroiled in political intrigue when Il-seok conspires with a corrupt politician Jo Seo-hee to frame Tae-san for the murder of an undercover agent, who had infiltrated the gang under the orders of prosecutor Park Jae-kyung. Tae-san is arrested by detective Im Seung-woo, who happens to be In-hye's current fiancé. While being transported, the police car he's in gets into an accident and Tae-san escapes. Now a fugitive, he is hunted by both the police and an assassin, and what ensues is two weeks of his desperate struggle to save his life and his daughter's.

== Cast ==
=== Main ===
- Lee Joon-gi – Jang Tae-san

Orphaned at a young age when his father left and his mother committed suicide, Tae-san became a small-time gangster. After getting falsely accused of murder and learning that he has a daughter with leukemia, Tae-san spends the next two weeks in a life-or-death struggle to save himself and the girl.

- Kim So-yeon – Park Jae-kyung

A smart and warmhearted prosecutor who is determined to find out the truth about Jang Tae-san's murder case. She soon becomes convinced of his innocence and tries to help him.

- Ryu Soo-young – Im Seung-woo

A talented detective who comes from a long line of police officers in his family. He's leading the police manhunt for the fugitive Jang Tae-san, and is In-hye's current boyfriend.

- Park Ha-sun – Seo In-hye

She is the first love Tae-san can't forget, and unbeknownst to him, In-hye raised their daughter Soo-jin as a single mother for eight years. After Soo-jin's leukemia diagnosis, In-hye and Tae-san embark on a race against the clock to save their daughter's life.

- Kim Hye-ok – Jo Seo-hee

A corrupt politician who earns her money through companies managed by Moon Il-suk.

- Jo Min-ki – Moon Il-seok

A businessman with seemingly legit business interests, but is deep down a cruel and heartless man who will do everything to silence Jang Tae-san, who knows his secret.

- Lee Chae-mi – Seo Soo-jin

In-hye and Tae-san's eight-year-old daughter who has leukemia. She also hopes of meeting her father someday.

=== Supporting ===
- Song Jae-rim – Mr. Kim

A professional assassin who has served in the French Foreign Legion, who is hired by his father Il-seok to kill Tae-san before he's captured by the authorities.

- Kim Hyo-seo – Park Ji-sook

Soo-jin's doctor.

- Um Hyo-sup – Han Jung-woo

Chief prosecutor.

- Yoon Hee-seok – Do Sang-hoon

A prosecutor. He is Jae-kyung's senior colleague, and a Daddy-Long-Legs figure to her.

- Yeo Eui-joo – Kim Min-soo
- Jung In-gi – Yang Taek-nam
- Baek Seung-hoon – Kim Sang-ho
- Ahn Yong-joon – Jin Il-do

Rookie cop.

- Im Se-mi – Oh Mi-sook

A bar girl who was working undercover for Jae-kyung. She is murdered by Il-seok, and Tae-san is framed for her death.

- Park Joo-hyung – Im Hyung-jin
- Kim Bup-rae – Hwang Dae-joon
- Kim Young-choon – Jang Seok-doo
- Chun Ho-jin – Han Chi-gook
- Ahn Se-ha – Go Man-seok

Tae-san's best friend.

- Bae Je-ki – Jo Dae-ryong
- Park Ha-na – Jang Young-ja
- Kang Ha-neul – Kim Sung-joon

Seo-hee's son that Jae-kyung flew to Chicago in search of.

- Hyun Nam – So-young
- Nam Kyung-eup – Im Ki-ho
- Ahn Daniel – Student
- Greena Park – Woman in labor
- Go In-beom – Jae-kyung's father
- Seo Yi-sook – Deaf woman
- Chae Bin – Deaf woman's daughter

== Original soundtrack ==
Two weeks OST

Soundtrack album by Various artists
- Recorded: 2013
- Genre: Soundtrack
- Languages: Korean; English
- Labels: Sony Music; Star Entry Entertainment

=== Part 1 ===
Released on August 7, 2013
No.	Title	Artist	Length
1.	"Run" (운영)	Nell	2:58
2.	"Run" (Inst.)		2:58
Total length:			6:02

=== Part 2 ===
Released on August 14, 2013
No.	Title	Artist	Length
1.	"Love Leaves" (사랑의잎)	Ahn Ye-seul	4:24
2.	"Love Leaves" (Inst.)		4:24
Total length:			8:28

=== Part 3 ===
Released on August 21, 2013
No.	Title	Artist	Length
1.	"The Day You Come" (나가오는날)	Yoo Seung-woo	3:55
2.	"The Day You Come" (Inst.)		3:55
Total length:			7:00

=== Part 4 ===
Released on September 4, 2013
No.	Title	Artist	Length
1.	"Killing My Heart" (가슴을이다)	Kim Bo-kyung	4:10
2.	"Killing My Heart" (Inst.)		4:10
Total length:			8:20

=== Part 5 ===
Released on September 11, 2013
No.	Title	Artist	Length
1.	"This Is the Person" (이사럄이다)	Dick Punks	3:20
2.	"This Is the Person" (Inst.)		3:20
Total length:			6:40

=== Part 6 ===
Released on September 12, 2013
No.	Title	Artist	Length
1.	"Turning" (서노외)	TOXIC	2:59
2.	"Turning" (Inst.)		2:59
Total length:			7:18

=== Part 7 ===
Released on September 17, 2013
No.	Title	Artist	Length
1.	"Don't Cry My Love" (울지마사랑아)	The One	3:53
2.	"Don't Cry My Love" (Inst.)		3:53
Total length:			7:06

Disc 2:
No.	Title	Artist	Length
1.	"Two Weeks Title" (Opening Title)	Various Artists	0:47
2.	"Chase of Maze"	Various Artists	3:28
3.	"I'm Your Father"	Various Artists	3:46
4.	"Investigation"	Various Artists	1:35
5.	"Launch"	Various Artists	3:02
6.	"Misconception"	Various Artists	3:26
7.	"Mountain and Sun"	Various Artists	2:23
8.	"Plans"	Various Artists	2:30
9.	"Two Weeks Memories"	Various Artists	3:44
10.	"Two Weeks Memories (orchestra ver. )"	Various Artists	2:15
11.	"Two Weeks Memories (slow ver. )"	Various Artists	2:28
12.	"Two Weeks Memories (tension ver. )"	Various Artists	2:36
13.	"Dangerous Game"	Various Artists	2:35
14.	"Lost Memories"	Various Artists	2:45
15.	"Time"	Various Artists	2:30
16.	"Very Dangerous"	Various Artists	1:10
17.	"Who Is There?"	Various Artists	1:56

== Ratings ==
Episode #	Original broadcast date	Average audience share			
Episode #	Original broadcast date	TNmS Ratings		AGB Nielsen	
Episode #	Original broadcast date	Nationwide	Seoul National Capital Area	Nationwide	Seoul National Capital Area
1	August 7, 2013	7.6%	8.7%	7.5%	8.9%
2	August 8, 2013	7.7%	9.2%	8.0%	9.8%
3	August 14, 2013	10.3%	12.8%	10.0%	12.1%
4	August 15, 2013	8.8%	10.5%	9.2%	11.1%
5	August 21, 2013	8.6%	10.9%	8.1%	9.1%
6	August 22, 2013	9.2%	10.4%	10.1%	12.0%
7	August 28, 2013	8.5%	10.7%	9.4%	10.3%
8	August 29, 2013	9.0%	10.4%	11.5%	13.4%
9	September 4, 2013	9.8%	11.4%	9.5%	10.6%
10	September 5, 2013	9.9%	10.8%	9.9%	11.3%
11	September 11, 2013	9.4%	11.1%	9.5%	10.8%
12	September 12, 2013	9.4%	11.2%	11.0%	12.4%
13	September 18, 2013	8.3%	9.7%	8.7%	10.0%
14	September 19, 2013	8.6%	10.4%	8.8%	9.7%
15	September 25, 2013	9.3%	10.5%	9.4%	10.8%
16	September 26, 2013	10.4%	11.9%	11.0%	12.9%
Average		9.1%	10.7%	9.5%	11.0%

== Awards and nominations ==
Year	Award	Category	Recipient	Result
2013	2nd APAN Star Awards	Top Excellence Award, Actor	Lee Joon-gi	Won
2013	2nd APAN Star Awards	Excellence Award, Actress	Kim So-yeon	Won
2013	2nd APAN Star Awards	Acting Award, Actor	Chun Ho-jin	Nominated
2013	2nd APAN Star Awards	Best Writer	So Hyun-kyung	Won
2013	MBC Drama Awards	Excellence Award, Actor in a Miniseries	Lee Joon-gi	Nominated
2013	MBC Drama Awards	Excellence Award, Actress in a Miniseries	Kim So-yeon	Nominated
2013	MBC Drama Awards	Excellence Award, Actress in a Miniseries	Park Ha-sun	Nominated
2013	MBC Drama Awards	Golden Acting Award, Actor	Jo Min-ki	Nominated
2014	50th Baeksang Arts Awards	Most Popular Actor (TV)	Lee Joon-gi	Nominated
2014	50th Baeksang Arts Awards	Most Popular Actress (TV)	Park Ha-sun	Nominated

== International broadcast ==
It began airing in Japan on cable channel KNTV on December 27, 2013.

It began airing in Vietnam on channel HTV2 on December 5, 2014.

It began airing in Thailand on digital television MONO29 on 2015.

It began airing across in Southeast Asia on KIX on June 25, 2020 at 10 PM (GMT+8).

== Remake ==
in 2019, Horipro and Kansai TV made Japanese adaptation of series which Haruma Miura and Kyoko Yoshine in leading roles, it was last works of Miura before his death in 2020
