= The Return of Iljimae =

Television series

- Promotional poster
- Also known as: Moon River
- Hangul: 돌아온 일지매
- Hanja: 돌아온 一枝梅
- RR: Doraon Iljimae
- MR: Toraon Ilchimae
- Genre: Romance; Historical; Action
- Written by: Kim Kwang-sik; Do Young-myung
- Directed by: Hwang In-roi; Kim Soo-young
- Starring: Jung Il-woo; Yoon Jin-seo; Kim Min-jong; Jung Hye-young
- Country of origin: South Korea
- Original language: Korean
- No. of episodes: 24

Production
- Producer: Jaemoon Yoon MBC
- Production locations: South Korea; Japan
- Running time: 60 minutes
- Production companies: Green Pig Workshop; Roiworks

Original release
- Network: MBC TV
- Release: January 21 – April 9, 2009

Related
- Iljimae; The Vigilantes in Masks

The Return of Iljimae (Korean: 돌아온 일지매) is a 2009 South Korean historical action television series, starring Jung Il-woo in the title role of Iljimae, Yoon Jin-seo, Kim Min-jong and Jung Hye-young. It aired on MBC from January 21 to April 9, 2009 on Wednesdays and Thursdays at 21:55 for 24 episodes.

The series is based on comic strip Iljimae, published between 1975 and 1977, by Ko Woo-young which was based on a Chinese folklore from the Ming dynasty about a masked Robin Hood-esque character during the Joseon era. MBC bought the rights to the comic strip for their adaptation, which was to star Lee Seung-gi in the title role of Iljimae. However he pulled out and was replaced by Jung, which makes him the third Korean actor to play the hero following Jang Dong-gun (MBC, 1993) and Lee Joon-gi for Iljimae (SBS, 2008).

== Plot ==
Iljimae (Jung Il-woo) was born out of wedlock and his father was a high-ranking noble official while his mother was a lowly servant. To protect the honor of his father's family, he was abandoned as a baby and tucked underneath an apricot tree. Thus he was given the name Iljimae ("branch of plum tree").

Iljimae was adopted by a family who lived in the Qing Kingdom. After tracing his roots back to Korea, his father rejects him once more. With a heavy heart, he returns to his native land and unleashes his anger upon the ruling class to fight injustice and tyranny for the sake of the commoners. Wherever he appears to uphold justice, he leaves behind a single branch of a plum tree.

Living an isolated existence and hiding his face behind a mask to be a hero to the people, in Iljimae's life there is one woman who reconnects him to the world: Wol-hee.

== Cast and characters ==
=== Main cast ===
- Jung Il-woo - Iljimae, a hero who appears when the world needs justice.
  Although he is a handsome man with delicate features, he also has a strong sense of justice and chivalry. His first love dies tragically and after living an aimless life due to his broken heart, he meets Wol-hee, who is very similar to his first love. He becomes a legendary hero in the kingdom but his destiny is one of loneliness and heartbreak, making him a lonely and melancholy hero.
  - Cha Jun-hwan - young Iljimae
- Yoon Jin-seo - Dal-yi / Wol-hee
  Iljimae loves her for his entire life and she loves him back unconditionally. She is ahead of her times and displays a strong, charismatic personality and a burning defiance against evil people. She takes control of her destiny but in Iljimae's presence, she turns into a shy woman.
- Kim Min-jong - Koo Ja-myung, underneath his charismatic demeanor he has a sad past.
  A sharp thinker, he rises through the ranks in the government as he distinguishes himself as a capable investigator. He falls in love with Baek-mae, Iljimae's mother, at first sight and continues to love her for his entire life. Guilt-ridden for compromising his principles by helping Iljimae escape from prison, he committed suicide.
- Jung Hye-young - Baek-mae, Iljimae's mother
  She was defiled by her master, a noble, and after giving birth, her baby was taken away from her. Then she was banished from the nobleman's household and for most of her life, she yearns to be reunited with her son Iljimae. She throws away the jewelry that her master gave her to buy her silence and becomes a gisaeng. Though she is from the servant class, she learns how to read and write by watching the privileged children learn the alphabet. She writes poetry. She has inner beauty as well as beautiful looks. Though she sets strict limits on what she will tolerate in a relationship or friendship, she has a warm heart but keeps that side of her under wraps most of the time. She comminted suicide upon hearing that her son had been sentenced to death. Unbeknownst to her, Iljimae has escaped with the help of Ja-myung, but he arrived too late to stop her.

=== Supporting cast ===
- Kang Nam-gil as Bae Seon-dal
- Park Geun-hyung as Kim Ja-jeom
- O Yeong-su as Monk Yeol-gong
- Lee Kye-in as Jeol Chi
- Lee Hyun-woo as Cha-dol
- Jeon Soo-yeon as Soo-ryun
- Park Chul-min as Wang Hyoeng-bo
- Lee Ki-young as Park Bi-soo
- Lee Jung-yong as Yang-po
- Kim Yoo-hyun as Princess Mo-ran
- Moon Heo-won as Shim Chan-kyu
- Baek In-cheol as Son Seok-joo
- Kwak Min-suk as Kim Ja-jeom's servant
- Jeong In-taek as Choi Se-woon
- Yeo Min-joo as Choi Kyung-ok
- Seo Hye-won as Choon-wol
- Jung Dong-hwan as Choe Myeong-gil
- Harisu as Ki Seon-nyeo
- Park Hyuk-kwon as Lee Myung
- Cha Jun-hwan as Young-yi, Iljimae's son
- Lee Ga-hyun as Bong-hee
- Jeon Hae-ryong

=== Special appearances ===
- Lee Young-hoo as Princess Mo-ran's father
- Chun Ho-jin as Hong Taiji
- Maeng Sang-hoon as Iljimae's adoptive father
- Lee Ho-jae as Kim Joong-hwan, Iljimae's biological father
- Jung Joon as Kim Joon-seo, Iljimae's stepbrother
- Kang Shin-il as Kang Se-wook
- Jung Sung-il as Kotaro
- Sandara Park as Rie
- Park Chan-hwan as Rie's father
- Yoon Yoo-sun as Rie's mother
- Hwang Jang-lee as Miyamoto Musashi
- Lee Do-yeop
- Oh Chang-seok

== Episode ratings ==
| Date | Episode | Nationwide | Seoul |
|---|---|---|---|
| 2009-01-21 | 1 | 18.5% (4th) | 20.1% (3rd) |
| 2009-01-22 | 2 | 17.1% (4th) | 18.4% (3rd) |
| 2009-01-28 | 3 | 16.6% (5th) | 17.1% (4th) |
| 2009-01-29 | 4 | 15.1% (5th) | 15.6% (6th) |
| 2009-02-04 | 5 | 13.7% (9th) | 13.7% (11th) |
| 2009-02-05 | 6 | 15.3% (10th) | 15.2% (9th) |
| 2009-02-11 | 7 | 10.7% (11th) | 11.5% (9th) |
| 2009-02-12 | 8 | 13.1% (10th) | 14.1% (10th) |
| 2009-02-18 | 9 | 10.0% (13th) | 10.6% (12th) |
| 2009-02-19 | 10 | 11.0% (11th) | 12.1% (11th) |
| 2009-02-25 | 11 | 10.8% (11th) | 11.6% (11th) |
| 2009-02-26 | 12 | 10.5% (12th) | 10.5% (13th) |
| 2009-03-04 | 13 | 8.9% | 9.4% (16th) |
| 2009-03-05 | 14 | 9.1% (16th) | 9.7% (14th) |
| 2009-03-11 | 15 | 8.1% (20th) | 8.2% (18th) |
| 2009-03-12 | 16 | 7.6% | 8.4% |
| 2009-03-18 | 17 | 8.7% (19th) | 8.8% (17th) |
| 2009-03-19 | 18 | 8.5% | 8.7% (19th) |
| 2009-03-25 | 19 | 6.9% | 8.0% |
| 2009-03-26 | 20 | 8.5% | 8.7% (19th) |
| 2009-04-01 | 21 | 7.8% | 8.5% (16th) |
| 2009-04-02 | 22 | 8.2% | 8.8% (17th) |
| 2009-04-08 | 23 | 7.5% | 7.8% |
| 2009-04-09 | 24 | 8.2% (18th) | 8.9% (16th) |
| Average | | 10.9% | |

Source: TNS Media Korea

== International broadcast ==
Before it began airing in South Korea, broadcast rights were sold to Japan for US$1.32 million (or approximately US$55,000 per episode). It aired on cable channel KNTV from November 1, 2012 to January 8, 2013.
