= Chun Ho-jin =

South Korean actor (born 1960)

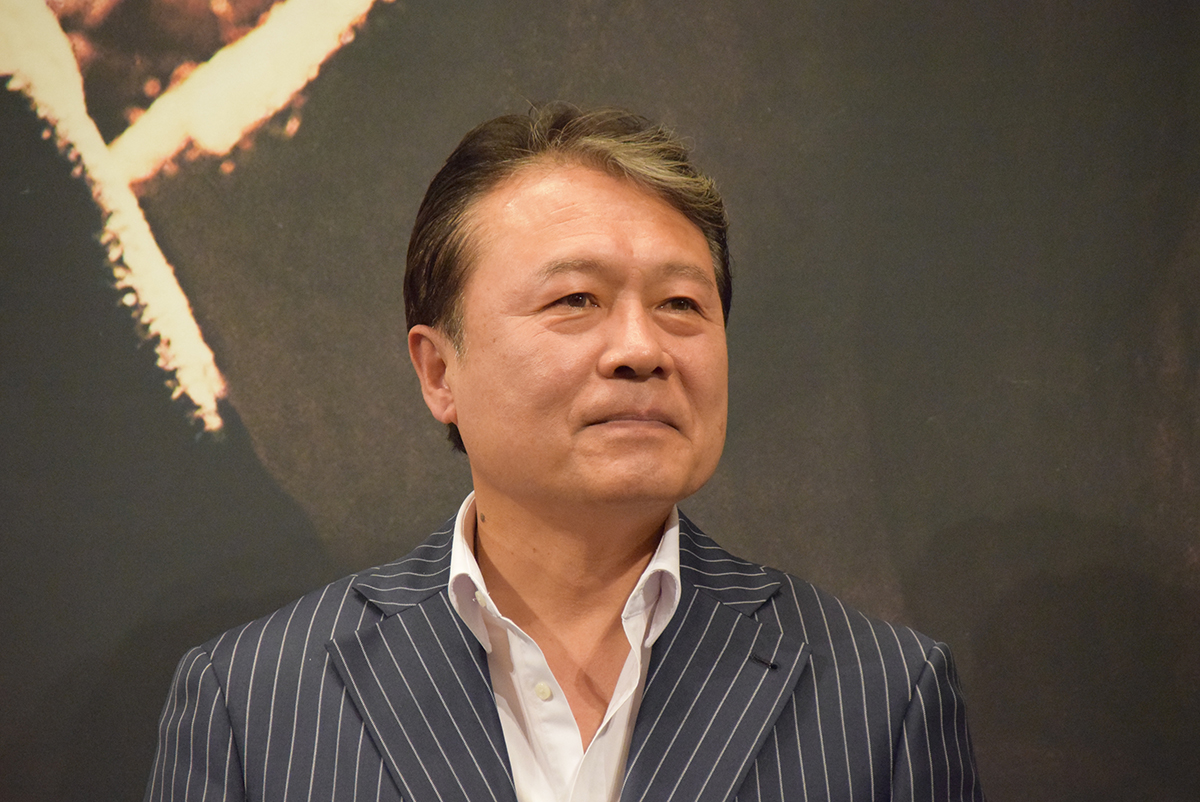
- Chun in April 2019
- Born: September 9, 1960 (age 66); Busan, South Korea
- Education: Inha University – Chemistry
- Occupation: Actor
- Years active: 1983–present
- Agent(s): J,Wide-Company
- Spouse: Unknown (m. 1986)
- Parent: Chun Gyu-deok (father)

Korean name
- Hangul: 천호진
- RR: Cheon Hojin
- MR: Ch'ŏn Hojin

Chun Ho-jin (Korean: 천호진; born September 9, 1960) is a South Korean actor.

== Early life ==
Chun studied chemistry at Inha University but dropped out to pursue acting. His father Chun Gyu-deok was among the first generation of professional wrestlers in the country.

== Career ==
Chun's acting career began in 1983 when he auditioned at Munhwa Broadcasting Corporation (MBC) and was selected. His first roles were mostly in miniseries and one-off telemovies (similar to KBS's Drama City). He came to prominence with viewers in the long-running KBS drama Love on a Jujube Tree (ko), which garnered him the Baeksang Arts Awards for Best New Actor in the television category in 1992. In later years, he earned the sobriquet "the national father" (국민 아버지) after portraying the father of the main characters in the family dramas My Golden Life (2017) and Once Again (2020), both of which had viewership ratings of over 30%. His portrayal of a bankrupt and down-on-his-luck man who has a complex relationship with his wife and their four adult children in My Golden Life won critical acclaim from both critics and viewers and earned him the Grand Prize (Daesang) (Note: A Daesang (Korean: 대상), which translates to "Grand Prize", is the highest honor given out at South Korean award ceremonies.) at the 2017 KBS Drama Awards and a string of award nominations.

== Filmography ==
=== Film ===
Year	Title	Role
1986	Street of Desire	
1986	Chung: Blue Sketch	Ji-hoon
1987	Iron Wind	Sung-kyu
1987	Dolai 3	
1987	Hello Im Kkeokjeong	
1988	Lee Jang-ho's Alien Baseball Team 2	Ma Dong-tak
1988	Sunshine at Present	Man-ki
1989	The Report of the Daughter-in-law's Rice Flower	Chang-soo
1990	Oseam	Monk Haeng-woon
1990	Dreaming Plant	
1991	The Wedding Dress of Tears	Hak-soo
1992	The Season of Percussion	Eun-hoe
2002	2009 Lost Memories	Senjin leader
2003	Double Agent	Baek Seung-cheol
2004	Once Upon a Time in High School	Hyun-soo's father (cameo)
2004	The Big Swindle	Squad leader Cha
2004	Temptation of Wolves	Jung Tae-sung's father (cameo)
2004	Doll Master	Director Choi
2005	Crying Fist	Sang-chul
2005	Blood Rain	Commission agent Kang
2005	All for Love	Jo Jae-kyung
2006	Vampire Cop Ricky	Detective Kang
2006	Daisy	Detective Jang
2006	A Dirty Carnival	President Hwang
2006	Midnight Ballad for Ghost Theater	Woo Ki-nam
2007	Skeletons in the Closet (Shim's Family)	Shim Chang-soo
2007	Miss Gold Digger	Shin Mi-soo's father (cameo)
2008	The Guard Post	Sergeant major Noh Seong-gyu
2009	The Sword with No Name	Daewongun
2010	I Saw the Devil	Section chief Oh
2010	Enemy at the Dead End	Kim Min-ho
2010	The Unjust	Police bureau chief Kang
2010	Finding Mr. Destiny	Colonel Seo
2011	My Way	Kim Jun-shik's father
2012	The Neighbor	Pyo Jong-rok
2013	Horny Family	Seo Jung-min
2014	Mr. Perfect	Seok-gu
2015	The Treacherous	Im Sa-hong
2015	Veteran	Regional investigation unit senior superintendent
2015	The Chosen: Forbidden Cave	Reverend Kang
2017	Lucid Dream	Jo Myeong-cheol
2017	The Chase	Na Jung-hyuk

=== Television series ===
Year	Title	Role	Notes/Ref.
	Chief Inspector		Cameo
1986	MBC Bestseller Theater – "The Midday of Youth"	Hwang Sa-bin	
1988	Encounter	Jung Ha-sang	
1988	Whoa Hey Whoa Hey	Kim Hyo-sik	
1988	500 Years of Joseon: The Memoirs of Lady Hyegyeong		
1989	The Carousel		
1989	The Region of Calm	Military judge advocate	
1990	What Women Want	Han-soo	
1990	Waiting People		
1990	Love on a Jujube Tree	Hwang Dae-chul	
1990	The Dance of Sky Breaking	Du Mi-so	
1991	Near the Valley		
1991	Women's Time	Jung-hoon	
1991	Humble Men	Yoon-seok	
1991	Autumn Flowers in Winter Trees		
1992	Drama Game – "Father's Wineglass"		
1992	Self-Portrait in Black	Byung-chil	
1992	Bramble Flowers	Han Soo-bin	
1993	Drama Game – "A Woman's Favorite Requiem"		
1993	Third Republic	Park Chi-ok	
1993	Wangsimni	Min Joon-tae	
1994	Love in Your Embrace	Jung Do-il	
1994	Hidden Pictures	Choi Jae-pil	
1994	That Window	Choi Min-young	
1995	Dreaming of Superman		
1995	Korea Gate	Park Seon-ho	
1995	Auntie Ok	Dae-gil	
1996	In the Name of Love	Park Chul-kyu	
1996	Drama Game – "Everyday I Turn Thirty"		
1996	Drama Game – "The Prison of My Mind–		
1996	Drama Game – "Ppaengdeok's Mother and Hong Gil-dong–		
1996	Hometown of Legends – "Deokdaegol"		
1996	Splendid Holiday	Sahara	
1996	A Faraway Country	Choi Wook-jin	
1997	Model	Jo Tae-sik	
1997	Untitled 5		
1997	The Mountain	Choi Ki-tae	
1997	Star		
1997	Love Better Than a Great Love		
1998	The Age of the 3 Kim's	Kim Sang-hyun	
1998	Married 7 Years	Ui-gyo	
1998	Living with the Enemy: I Wish You Would Die	Kim Chang-soo	
1998	For Love		
1999	Dish of the Day	Jae-hyuk	
1999	Someone's House	Hong-chul	
2000	Tough Guy's Love	Jo Dong-chul	
2000	I Want to Keep Seeing You	Park Dal-bong	
2000	SWAT Police	Lee Dong-sik	
2000	Legends of Love	Jung Young-seok	
2000	Secretary		
2001	Drama City – "Map to Ramon"	Joon-ha	
2001	Father and Sons	Seo Kwang-tae	
2001	Pure Heart	Captain Cha	
2002	Dotorimuk (Acorn Jelly)	Dong-chul	
2002	Zoo People	Go Hyun-sik	
2003	Drama City – "Terrible Love"	Detective	
2003	Open Drama Man and Woman: My Beautiful Ajumma	Detective Oh	
2003	Long Live Love	Lee Chul-sik	
2004	Kkangsooni	Kang Gook-han	
2005	Three Leaf Clover	Park Geun-ho	
2006	The Snow Queen	Kim Jang-soo	
2007	Prince Hours	Grand Prince Lee Gyeom	
2009	The Return of Iljimae	Hong Taiji	
2009	Good Job, Good Job	Han Sung-hoon	
2009	Smile, You	Kang Sang-hoon	
2009	Will It Snow for Christmas?	Han Joon-soo	
2010	Dong Yi	Choe Hyo-won	Cameo
2010	Grudge: The Revolt of Gumiho	Manshin	
2011	Paradise Ranch	Lee Eok-soo	
2011	Midas	Choi Gook-hwan	
2011	City Hunter	Choi Eung-chan	
2011	Bravo, My Love!	Kang Hyung-do	
2011	Saving Mrs. Go Bong-shil	David Kim	
2012	God of War	Yi Gyubo	
2012	Bridal Mask	Kimura Taro	
2012	Seoyoung, My Daughter	Lee Sam-jae	
2013	All About My Romance	Go Dae-ryong	
2013	Ugly Alert	Na Il-pyung	
2013	Good Doctor	Choi Woo-seok	
2013	Two Weeks	Han Chi-gook	
2014	12 Years Promise	Yoo Jung-han	
2014	Doctor Stranger	Jang Seok-joo	
2015	House of Bluebird	Jang Tae-soo	
2015	Six Flying Dragons	Yi Seong-gye	
2016	Love in the Moonlight	Kim Heon	
2017	Chicago Typewriter	Baek Do-ha	
2017	Man to Man	Baek In-su	
2017	My Golden Life	Seo Tae-su	
2018	Life	Lee Bo-hoon	
2018	My Strange Hero	Teacher Park	
2019	Save Me 2	Choi Kyung-suk	
2020	Once Again	Song Young-dal	
2021	Beyond Evil	Nam Sang-bae	
2021	The Road: The Tragedy of One	Seo Ki-tae	
2022	My Liberation Notes	Yeom Jae-ho	
2023	Joseon Attorney	Yoo Je-se	
2023	Twinkling Watermelon	Choi Hyeon or Grandpa Viva	
2023–2024	The Story of Park's Marriage Contract	Kang Sang-mo	
2025	Heavenly Ever After	Center Director	
2025	The Nice guy	Park Sil-Gon	
2025	Our Golden Days	Lee Sang-cheol	

== Musical theatre ==
Year	Title	Role
1984–1985	Jesus Christ Superstar	Simon the Zealot
1993	Evita	Juan Perón
1997–1998	Jesus Christ Superstar	Pontius Pilate
2012	La Cage aux Folles	Monsieur Edouard Dindon

== Bibliography ==
Year	Title	Publisher	ISBN
2009	Chun Ho-jin's Woodworking DIY	Open House Books	ISBN 9788993824230

== Accolades ==
=== Awards and nominations ===
Year	Award	Category	Nominated work	Result
1989	KBS Drama Awards	Best New Actor	The Carousel	Nominated
1992	28th Baeksang Arts Awards	Best New Actor (TV)	Love on a Jujube Tree	Won
1992	KBS Drama Awards	Excellence Award, Actor	Love on a Jujube Tree, Self-Portrait in Black, Bramble Flowers	Nominated
1994	KBS Drama Awards	Excellence Award, Actor	Love on a Jujube Tree, Hidden Pictures	Won
1998	KBS Drama Awards	Excellence Award, Actor	Love on a Jujube Tree	Nominated
2004	41st Grand Bell Awards	Best Supporting Actor	The Big Swindle	Nominated
2007	44th Grand Bell Awards	Best Supporting Actor	A Dirty Carnival	Nominated
2008	2nd Asian Film Awards	Best Supporting Actor	Skeletons in the Closet	Nominated
2010	KBS Drama Awards	Best Supporting Actor	Grudge: The Revolt of Gumiho	Nominated
2011	SBS Drama Awards	Special Acting Award, Actor in a Drama Special	City Hunter	Nominated
2012	KBS Drama Awards	Grand Prize (Daesang)	Bridal Mask, Seoyoung, My Daughter	Nominated
2012	KBS Drama Awards	Top Excellence Award, Actor	Bridal Mask, Seoyoung, My Daughter	Nominated
2012	KBS Drama Awards	Excellence Award, Actor in a Serial Drama	Seoyoung, My Daughter	Nominated
2013	2nd APAN Star Awards	Acting Award, Actor	Seoyoung, My Daughter, Two Weeks	Nominated
2013	SBS Drama Awards	Special Acting Award, Actor in a Weekend/Daily Drama	Ugly Alert	Nominated
2015	SBS Drama Awards	Top Excellence Award, Actor in a Serial Drama	Six Flying Dragons	Nominated
2017	KBS Drama Awards	Grand Prize (Daesang)	My Golden Life	Won
2017	KBS Drama Awards	Top Excellence Award, Actor	My Golden Life	Nominated
2017	KBS Drama Awards	Excellence Award, Actor in a Serial Drama	My Golden Life	Nominated
2018	11th Korea Drama Awards	Grand Prize (Daesang)	My Golden Life	Nominated
2018	54th Baeksang Arts Awards	Best Actor (TV)	My Golden Life	Nominated
2018	Korean Producer Awards	Best Performer Award	My Golden Life	Won
2020	KBS Drama Awards	Grand Prize (Daesang)	Once Again	Won
2020	KBS Drama Awards	Top Excellence Award, Actor	Once Again	Nominated
2020	KBS Drama Awards	Excellence Award, Actor in a Serial Drama	Once Again	Nominated
2020	KBS Drama Awards	Best Couple Award with Lee Jung-eun	Once Again	Won
2021	48th Korea Broadcasting Prizes	Best Actor	Once Again	Won
2021	Brand Customer Loyalty Award 2021	Nation's Actor	—N/a	Won
2025	KBS Drama Awards	Grand Prize (Daesang)	Our Golden Days	Nominated
2025	KBS Drama Awards	Top Excellence Award, Actor	Our Golden Days	Nominated
2025	KBS Drama Awards	Excellence Award, Actor in a Serial Drama	Our Golden Days	Nominated

=== State honors ===
Name of country, year given, and name of honor
Country	Year	Honor	Ref.
South Korea (Note: Honors are given at the Korean Popular Culture and Arts Awards, arranged by the Korea Creative Content Agency and hosted by the Ministry of Culture, Sports and Tourism. They are awarded to those who have contributed to the arts and South Korea's pop culture.)	2020	Presidential Commendation	
