= My Dear Cat =

- Promotional poster
- Also known as: I Have a Cat; A Cat! Meow; There's a Meowing Cat
- Genre: Romance; Comedy; Family
- Written by: Lee Eun-joo
- Directed by: Kim Won-yong
- Starring: Choi Yoon-young; Hyun Woo; Choi Min; Jun Hyo-seong
- Country of origin: South Korea
- Original language: Korean
- No. of episodes: 119

Production
- Executive producer: Jung Hae-ryong
- Producer: Kim Dong-hwi
- Running time: 30 minutes

Original release
- Network: KBS1
- Release: June 9 – November 21, 2014

My Dear Cat (Korean: 고양이는 있다; RR: Goyangineun itda; lit. There is a Cat) is a 2014 South Korean daily television drama starring Choi Yoon-young, Hyun Woo, Choi Min, and Jun Hyo-seong. Advertised as a "new concept comic mystery daily drama," it aired on KBS1 from June 9 to November 21, 2014 on Mondays to Fridays at 20:25 for 119 episodes.

== Plot ==
While looking for her lost cat, magazine journalist Go Yang-soon meets law school student and part-time photographer Yeom Chi-woong. Soon, they begin to get to know each other and each other's families.

== Cast ==
=== Main characters ===
- Choi Yoon-young as Go Yang-soon
- Hyun Woo as Yeom Chi-woong
- Choi Min as Yoon Sung-il
- Jun Hyo-seong as Han Soo-ri

=== Supporting characters ===
Yang-soon's family

- Dokgo Young-jae as Go Dong-joon
- Lee Kyung-jin as Han Young-sook
- Park So-hyun as Han Eun-sook

Chi-woong's Family

- Lee Jae-yong as Yeom Byung-soo
- Seo Yi-sook as Hong Soo-ja
- Choi Sung-min as Yeom Chi-joo

Sung-il's family

- Hwang Beom-shik as Yoon Noh-in
- Kim Seo-ra as Yoon Hye-jung
- Go Won-hee as Shin Ji-eun

Volcano Building

- Kim Young-jae as Shin Se-ki
- Yoon In-jo as Choi Do-hee
- Go Do-young as Joon-ah
- Ban Sang-yoon as Hwang Tae-soo

== Ratings ==
Episode Number	Original Broadcast Date		TNmS	
Episode Number	KBS1	KBS World	Nationwide	Seoul
1	June 9, 2014	June 23, 2014	23.5%	21.8%
2	June 10, 2014	June 24, 2014	21.8%	20.3%
3	June 11, 2014	June 25, 2014	19.9%	18.0%
4	June 12, 2014	June 26, 2014	21.0%	19.7%
5	June 13, 2014	June 27, 2014	18.1%	16.1%
6	June 16, 2014	June 30, 2014	19.9%	18.2%
7	June 17, 2014	July 1, 2014	19.2%	17.8%
8	June 18, 2014	July 2, 2014	18.2%	17.0%
9	June 19, 2014	July 3, 2014	20.0%	19.2%
10	June 20, 2014	July 4, 2014	16.7%	14.6%
11	June 23, 2014	July 7, 2014	19.3%	16.2%
12	June 24, 2014	July 8, 2014	20.2%	18.9%
13	June 25, 2014	July 9, 2014	19.3%	18.7%
14	June 26, 2014	July 10, 2014	20.6%	18.7%
15	June 27, 2014	July 11, 2014	17.2%	15.7%
16	June 30, 2014	July 14, 2014	19.8%	18.4%
17	July 1, 2014	July 15, 2014	21.3%	19.4%
18	July 2, 2014	July 16, 2014	19.4%	17.2%
19	July 3, 2014	July 17, 2014	18.7%	16.5%
20	July 4, 2014	July 18, 2014	18.8%	16.3%
21	July 7, 2014	July 21, 2014	19.0%	18.0%
22	July 8, 2014	July 22, 2014	20.0%	17.3%
23	July 9, 2014	July 23, 2014	17.0%	15.3%
24	July 10, 2014	July 24, 2014	20.1%	19.1%
25	July 11, 2014	July 25, 2014	18.4%	17.3%
26	July 14, 2014	July 28, 2014	20.0%	18.0%
27	July 15, 2014	July 29, 2014	20.8%	19.0%
28	July 16, 2014	July 30, 2014	19.7%	17.8%
29	July 17, 2014	July 31, 2014	20.5%	18.4%
30	July 18, 2014	August 1, 2014	n/a	n/a

Blue ratings denote the highest numbers the series has garnered.
Red ratings denote the lowest numbers the series has garnered.
(-) denotes that episode has not yet been aired in that channel.

== Awards and nominations ==
Year	Award	Category	Recipient	Result
2014	7th Korea Drama Awards	Best New Actress	Jun Hyo-seong	Nominated
2014	KBS Drama Awards	Excellence Award, Actor in a Daily Drama	Hyun Woo	Nominated
2014	KBS Drama Awards	Excellence Award, Actress in a Daily Drama	Choi Yoon-young	Won

== See also ==
- List of South Korean dramas
