= Goo Hyun-sook =

South Korean screenwriter (fl. 21st century)

- 구현숙
- Occupation: Screenwriter
- Years active: 1999–present
- Agent: Pan Entertainment
- Notable work: The Gentlemen of Wolgyesu Tailor Shop

Korean name
- Hangul: 구현숙
- RR: Gu Hyeonsuk
- MR: Ku Hyŏnsuk

Goo Hyun-sook (Korean: 구현숙) is a South Korean screenwriter under Pan Entertainment. She debuted in 1999 with the KBS2 drama mini-series Magic Castle.

== Filmography ==
Year	Title	Original title	Network	Ref.
1999	Magic Castle	마법의 성	KBS2	
2001	TV Novel: Flower Story	매화연가	KBS2	
2003	Dal Joong's Cinderella	달중씨의 신데렐라	KBS2	
2003	Site tracing siren	현장추적 싸이렌	KNN	
2004	TV Novel: You are a Star	그대는 별	KBS1	
2006	Hearts of Nineteen	열아홉 순정	KBS1	
2008	Chunja's Happy Events	춘자네 경사났네	MBC TV	
2011	Indomitable Daughters-in-Law	불굴의 며느리	MBC TV	
2013	A Hundred Year Legacy	백년의 유산	MBC TV	
2014	4 Legendary Witches	전설의 마녀	MBC TV	
2016	The Gentlemen of Wolgyesu Tailor Shop	월계수 양복점 신사들	KBS2	
2019	Never Twice	두 번은 없다	MBC TV	
2025	Please Take Care of the Five Eagle Brothers	독수리 오형제를 부탁해	KBS2	

== Awards and nominations ==
Year	Award	Category	Nominated work	Result	Ref.
2013	MBC Drama Awards	Writer of the Year	A Hundred Year Legacy	Won	
