= Seoyoung, My Daughter =

2012 South Korean television series

- Promotional poster
- Hangul: 내 딸 서영이
- Hanja: 내 딸 㥠榮이
- Lit.: My Daughter, Seo-young
- RR: Nae ttal Seoyeongi
- MR: Nae ttal Sŏyŏngi
- Genre: Romance; Family; Drama
- Written by: So Hyun-kyung
- Directed by: Yoo Hyun-ki
- Starring: Lee Bo-young; Lee Sang-yoon; Chun Ho-jin; Park Hae-jin
- Country of origin: South Korea
- Original language: Korean
- No. of episodes: 50

Production
- Executive producer: Moon Bo-hyun
- Producer: Hwang In-hyuk

Original release
- Network: Korean Broadcasting System
- Release: 15 September 2012 – 3 March 2013

Seoyoung, My Daughter (Korean: 내 딸 서영이) is a 2012 South Korean television series, starring Lee Bo-young, Lee Sang-yoon, Chun Ho-jin, and Park Hae-jin. The family drama focuses on the broken relationship between Seo-young and her father, who later reunite with the help of her twin brother. It aired on KBS2 from September 15, 2012, to March 3, 2013, on Saturdays and Sundays at 19:55 for 50 episodes.

It recorded a peak viewership rating of 47.6%, making it the highest rated Korean drama of 2013.

== Cast ==
- Lee Bo-young as Lee Seo-young
  - Lee Hye-in as young Seo-young
- Lee Sang-yoon as Kang Woo-jae
- Chun Ho-jin as Lee Sam-jae
- Park Hae-jin as Lee Sang-woo
- Park Jung-ah as Kang Mi-kyung
- Choi Yoon-young as Choi Ho-jung
- Hong Yo-seob as Choi Min-seok
- Choi Jung-woo as Kang Ki-beom
- Kim Hye-ok as Cha Ji-sun
- Lee Jung-shin as Kang Sung-jae
- Kim Seol-hyun as Seo Eun-soo
- Song Ok-sook as Kim Kang-soon
- Jo Eun-sook as Yoon So-mi
- Shim Hyung-tak as Choi Kyung-ho
- Jang Hee-jin as Jung Sun-woo
- Cha Min-ji as Ha-young
- Lee Si-eon as man on blind date

== Plot ==
=== 2009 ===
Twin siblings Lee Seo-young (Lee Bo-young) and Lee Sang-woo (Park Hae-jin) have often suffered hardships along with their mother due to their father Lee Sam-jae's (Chun Ho-jin) poor financial decisions and getting conned out of his money led by his own ambitions. Desperate to survive, the twins have taken various odd jobs while Seo-young studies law and Sang-woo studies medicine in their small rooftop house in Seoul. When the twins' mother dies in Jeju Province, Seo-young, reaching her limits, holds Sam-jae responsible for her mother's death and decides to walk out of his life. When Sam-jae moves into their rooftop house against her wishes, Seo-young without telling Sam-jae moves in with the wealthy Kang family as the latest hired live-in tutor of their youngest son, Kang Sung-jae (Lee Jung-shin). The job is suggested by one of Seo-young's professors to prevent her from deferring her studies again.

Kang Woo-jae (Lee Sang-yoon), the eldest son of the Kangs, returns home after being discharged from the army. Woo-jae, despising politics within his own house, plans to stay for a short while and then to go to the United States. After meeting Seo-young and spending time with her, he falls in love and secretly begins aggressively pursuing her. However, despite the two having feelings for each other, Seo-young is resistant during the whole courtship due to her low social status and personal insecurities. The Kang family finds out the secret relationship between Seo-young and Woo-jae, which is met with great resistance. However, after much pleadings and compromises, Kang Woo-jae makes a deal with his father: if his father allows Lee Seo-young to enter the Kang family, he'll stay behind in South Korea and join the family business empire. Because Woo-jae's father, Kang Ki-beom (Choi Jung-woo), had always been desperate for his son to join the family business, he accepts the terms and convinces everyone else to agree to this marriage. However, fearing that the Kangs would reject her upon learning about her troublesome father, Seo-young falsely declares her father dead towards her future in-laws. Unfortunately, such a lie causes a rift with the twins as Sang-woo finds his sister leaving her family for a man unacceptable. Despite rough transition into the Kangs, she successfully enters the family. Seo-young keeps her marriage a secret from Sam-jae. To his shock, Sam-jae accidentally attends his own daughter's wedding as one of paid phony guests and then hides his face to avoid being identified.

Meanwhile, Choi Ho-jung (Choi Yoon-young), a wealthy naïve girl, is saved by Lee Sang-woo. Although their encounters were innocent at first, Ho-jung falls in love with Sang-woo. However, he does not reciprocate those feelings and makes it clear he wants his space to be respected. Despite being told to be given space, Ho-jung cannot help herself and always finds an excuse to see Sang-woo. However, her controlling mother sends her away to study overseas. Ho-jung makes a tearful vow to see Sang-woo once again, despite the awkwardness.

=== 2012–13: Three years later ===
Three years have passed. Seo-young, now an accomplished judge and lawyer, has earned her place in the family. Lee Sam-jae, despite knowing his daughter lied to him about moving away to the United States, quietly accepts the situation and secretly watches over her. Seo-young secretly has watched over her family as well. During one of Sam-jae's secret visits to see Seo-young, Sam-jae saves Woo-jae from getting hit by a car. Woo-jae feels an unusual link with Sam-jae, and the two befriend each other without Woo-jae realizing who Sam-jae actually is. In gratitude, Woo-jae lands Sam-jae a security job at the company, but Sam-jae displays unusual behavior to Woo-jae whenever Seo-young was around. After Sam-jae quits his security job, Woo-jae discovers Sam-jae's photo of Seo-young at his locker. Therefore, Woo-jae researches Sam-jae and is shocked to discover his savior is his father-in-law.

Sang-woo, now a doctor, is dating Kang Mi-kyung (Park Jung-ah), not knowing that she is the middle child and the only daughter of the Kang family. Mi-kyung, having been always chased down by suitors primarily for her wealth, has consistently maintained a false status as a poor orphaned-nobody and maintains the façade to Sang-woo. When he discovers Mi-kyung's actual status, Sang-woo realizes it would risk exposing his sister Seo-young, whom he still loves despite his anger toward Seo-young's life choices. When Sang-woo confronts Mi-kyung about the truth, she regretfully admits that she lied only because she wanted a true love and not someone going after her fortune. While Sang-woo was angry, he also uses this chance to break up with Mi-kyung, citing their social class differences is too great and that his heart changed after learning about her real identity. Mi-kyung, having great difficulty accepting Sang-woo's reasoning(s), does not give up on Sang-woo.

In hopes to prompt Mi-kyung into giving up on their love, Sang-woo hastily proposes to Choi Ho-jung, who has been desperate for Sang-woo's love, especially a while after returning from her overseas studies. Without even dating, Sang-woo promises to be a good husband to her. The marriage shocks Mi-kyung, Sam-jae, and other people who knew Sang-woo and Mi-kyung's relationship, like Woo-jae, who discovers that Sang-woo is his brother-in-law. Still not giving up, Mi-kyung enters Sang-woo and Sam-jae's (formerly Seo-young's) rooftop house and discovers photos of Seo-young inside the Lee family's photo album and instantly has clarity on the situation. Mi-kyung confronts Sang-woo about protecting his sister's lies. Despite the truth being discovered and no longer having a reason to continue his phony engagement to Ho-jung, Sang-woo still goes on with the wedding to honor his word to Ho-jung.

Although the wedding is a public event, neither Sang-woo nor Ho-jung has legally signed marriage papers. Despite sleeping together, they never consummate their "platonic marriage". However, over time, Sang-woo learns more about Ho-jung and more of her qualities rather than see her as just a love-crazed girl. Eventually, he slowly realizes his feelings for Ho-jung but feels awkward to court his supposed wife. Despite the charade, Ho-jung told Sang-woo that she will wait as long as it takes for him to finally love her as a true wife.

Meanwhile, the Kangs suffer a series of major blows. Mi-kyung, still on the rebound, gets too drunk and accidentally hints enough of the truth for her best friend, Kelly Jung Sun-woo (Jang Hee-jin), a childhood friend who covets Woo-jae and wants to uncover the truth. Woo-jae, desiring to become a father, finds out that Seo-young secretly has been taking birth control pills behind his back, revealing her unwillingness to be a mother. Fed up with her lies, he demands a divorce.

Furthermore, Sung-jae, who has successfully entered college thanks to Seo-young's educational assistance, discovers that he is not only adopted but also the illegitimate son of Kang Ki-beom and his secretary, Yoon So-mi (Jo Eun-sook), with whom he had a one-night stand. Unable to support him and give Sung-jae a happy life, Secretary Yoon decided to give him up to the Kangs as he is technically a Kang. This indiscretion leads Ki-beom and his wife Cho Ji-sun (Kim Hye-ok), whom Ki-beom has been avoiding mostly throughout their loveless arranged marriage, to separate. Sung-jae himself is confused as he is not sure how to react to his adoptive mother and his biological mother. With the help of Seo-young, he is able to be at peace with himself and with his mothers. Yoon So-mi resigns as the company's secretary and then, after seeing Sung-jae make peace, moves on with her life away from the Kangs.

Although Woo-jae and Seo-young are in the middle of separation, Seo-young continues to perform her duties as a family member to the Kangs. Eventually, Sun-woo confronts Seo-young about her lies. However, seeing how they are already in the midst of divorcing each other, Seo-young asks Sun-woo to keep the secret long enough for her to finalize the divorce and to leave the Kangs peacefully without inciting family strife. However, Seo-young's mother-in-law, Ji-sun, discovers a rift between Woo-jae and Seo-young and accuses Sun-woo of causing Seo-young to suffer. Sun-woo inadvertently corrects Ji-sun over her good perceptions of Seo-young. Once Woo-jae's parents discover the truth, there is no recourse but divorce, and Seo-young assures her in-laws that she is already in the process to rectify the situation.

When the Lees discover that Seo-young was getting divorced, both the brother and father feel guilty as each believed this event was somehow triggered by themselves (which both technically did in different time frames). In his own attempts to fix the situation, Sam-jae invites Woo-jae for a drink and to hear a story involving Seo-young's past. Sam-jae reveals his personal dark history and how his selfishness had made Seo-young miserable. After learning the whole picture, Woo-jae is overcome with guilt over mistreating his wife. However, he realizes there is little he could do at this point but to grant Seo-young their divorce.

Some time later, Seo-young moves out of the Kangs and rents her own apartment. She stops working for Jung Sun-woo's law firm, where she quit as a judge and work as a lawyer instead, and decides to open her own private law firm to focus on cases of personal interest. Despite starting things over alone, Woo-jae always remains close as he still loves Seo-young, but she resists his advances and transparent ploy to "just be friends." Eventually, the full scale of the truth comes forth, and the Kangs now understand her reasons and even welcome her back as they felt she has done many great things for the family, despite no longer affiliated with them. However, Woo-jae does not want his parents to interfere in their relationship since they are effectively divorced. Ho-jung herself becomes increasingly worried after realizing Sang-woo left Mi-kyung for the sake of his sister's secret, but with that exposed, she fears Sang-woo would leave her. However, Sang-woo now loves Ho-jung, assures her he is not leaving her, and finally embraces her as his wife.

After everything that has happened, Seo-young takes deep reflection upon herself as well as the actions of the people around her, especially her father. She avoids her family the entire time because she fears Sam-jae would bring new troubles for her and she dreads the consequences of covering for her father. However, she now realizes that Sam-jae is a changed man and that he has an honest hard-working man for the past three years without relapsing to bad investments and gambling. After realizing all of his efforts for her and in combination of her desire to have her family back, the Lees reconciled in their past troubles and are okay with each again.

However, then Sam-jae encounters his near-death experience. Sam-jae previously saved Woo-jae from getting hit by a car, but Sam-jae at the time denied to be medically checked to avoid detection from his daughter. Because of that car impact to his abdomen, his internal injuries begin to cause serious pains in his stomach, and it eventually lands him the hospital. His internal injuries are severe, and he might not make it. Woo-jae is wrought with guilt over the matter as he felt responsible, but Sam-jae absolves him, telling him it is nobody's fault. Meanwhile, Seo-young admits to Woo-jae that she loves him greatly and needs him; the two are reunited. Shortly, Sam-jae recovers from his injuries, and Seo-young proposed to Woo-jae for them to remarry. To make this a special moment, the twins would officially hold a second wedding ceremony with Sam-jae present together with his children.

=== Two years later ===
Two years has passed, and everyone has moved on in peace. Seo-young is once again Mrs. Kang and now have a baby girl with Woo-jae. Sang-woo and Ho-jung are now a true couple. Ho-jung now runs her own arts and crafts doll-making shop and is pregnant with twins. Sung-jae always wanted to be an actor, but he had limited success and became a successful talent manager for Ho-jung's father, who resigned as director of the Kangs' company three years ago and then became an actor over time. After resolving things between Ji-sun and Ki-beom, the two found a new appreciation for each other. They did not divorce and have remained together. Mi-kyung landed a special internship program in the US and is now studying to be a skilled internist. Sam-jae has moved on from his kids, feeling it is his time to let go and for him to focus on his life. He now works at a woodwork company making wooden furniture and made a special rocking-chair for Seo-young, who would be seen living a blissful life and no longer chained by her past sufferings.

== Production ==
Filming was cancelled temporarily on December 18, 2012, when 30 actors who were members of the Korea Broadcasting Actors Union (KBAU) joined the strike to protest the network's non-payment of overdue salaries.

== Ratings ==
In the tables below, the blue numbers represent the lowest ratings and the red numbers represent the highest ratings.

Episode #	Original broadcast date	Average audience share			
Episode #	Original broadcast date	TNmS Ratings		AGB Nielsen	
Episode #	Original broadcast date	Nationwide	Seoul National Capital Area	Nationwide	Seoul National Capital Area
1	September 15, 2012	23.4% (1st)	23.4% (1st)	19.3% (1st)	19.3% (1st)
2	September 16, 2012	29.1% (1st)	28.9% (1st)	26.2% (1st)	25.9% (1st)
3	September 22, 2012	25.7% (1st)	24.9% (1st)	23.3% (1st)	23.7% (1st)
4	September 23, 2012	31.3% (1st)	31.8% (1st)	29.1% (1st)	29.8% (1st)
5	September 29, 2012	25.0% (1st)	25.9% (1st)	21.2% (1st)	22.1% (1st)
6	September 30, 2012	24.8% (1st)	24.9% (1st)	22.2% (1st)	22.0% (1st)
7	October 6, 2012	28.9% (1st)	28.9% (1st)	26.3% (1st)	26.2% (1st)
8	October 7, 2012	33.8% (1st)	34.9% (1st)	31.5% (1st)	32.2% (1st)
9	October 13, 2012	29.9% (1st)	29.2% (1st)	27.5% (1st)	27.8% (1st)
10	October 14, 2012	34.4% (1st)	34.9% (1st)	31.2% (1st)	31.4% (1st)
11	October 20, 2012	32.0% (1st)	33.2% (1st)	27.7% (1st)	28.0% (1st)
12	October 21, 2012	32.9% (1st)	33.7% (1st)	32.6% (1st)	33.2% (1st)
13	October 27, 2012	32.5% (1st)	32.4% (1st)	29.6% (1st)	30.0% (1st)
14	October 28, 2012	36.7% (1st)	36.1% (1st)	33.3% (1st)	33.8% (1st)
15	November 3, 2012	30.9% (1st)	31.6% (1st)	28.3% (1st)	28.1% (1st)
16	November 4, 2012	34.0% (1st)	35.6% (1st)	32.9% (1st)	33.8% (1st)
17	November 10, 2012	29.8% (1st)	30.1% (1st)	28.2% (1st)	28.9% (1st)
18	November 11, 2012	36.6% (1st)	36.4% (1st)	32.7% (1st)	33.4% (1st)
19	November 17, 2012	29.2% (1st)	29.7% (1st)	27.9% (1st)	27.9% (1st)
20	November 18, 2012	32.8% (1st)	33.8% (1st)	31.1% (1st)	30.8% (1st)
21	November 24, 2012	28.8% (1st)	28.1% (1st)	26.1% (1st)	25.7% (1st)
22	November 25, 2012	35.2% (1st)	35.2% (1st)	31.6% (1st)	31.0% (1st)
23	December 1, 2012	30.0% (1st)	29.2% (1st)	26.4% (1st)	26.2% (1st)
24	December 2, 2012	35.8% (1st)	36.9% (1st)	32.6% (1st)	33.3% (1st)
25	December 8, 2012	30.3% (1st)	30.0% (1st)	28.6% (1st)	29.1% (1st)
26	December 9, 2012	33.8% (1st)	35.0% (1st)	32.2% (1st)	32.0% (1st)
27	December 15, 2012	31.3% (1st)	32.0% (1st)	27.1% (1st)	26.6% (1st)
28	December 16, 2012	33.0% (1st)	34.5% (1st)	29.6% (1st)	31.2% (1st)
29	December 22, 2012	32.4% (1st)	33.2% (1st)	29.0% (1st)	29.2% (1st)
30	December 23, 2012	39.8% (1st)	40.2% (1st)	35.6% (1st)	35.0% (1st)
31	December 29, 2012	35.5% (1st)	35.2% (1st)	33.9% (1st)	33.8% (1st)
32	December 30, 2012	39.9% (1st)	38.7% (1st)	37.2% (1st)	36.6% (1st)
33	January 5, 2013	39.9% (1st)	40.6% (1st)	36.3% (1st)	36.1% (1st)
34	January 6, 2013	41.3% (1st)	41.4% (1st)	40.2% (1st)	39.8% (1st)
35	January 12, 2013	38.1% (1st)	39.4% (1st)	36.8% (1st)	36.0% (1st)
36	January 12, 2013	45.0% (1st)	44.8% (1st)	42.3% (1st)	42.7% (1st)
37	January 19, 2013	38.5% (1st)	38.1% (1st)	38.1% (1st)	38.2% (1st)
38	January 20, 2013	44.7% (1st)	47.4% (1st)	42.2% (1st)	42.2% (1st)
39	January 26, 2013	39.5% (1st)	41.1% (1st)	39.8% (1st)	40.5% (1st)
40	January 27, 2013	47.2% (1st)	47.5% (1st)	45.6% (1st)	46.1% (1st)
41	February 2, 2013	42.6% (1st)	44.2% (1st)	38.8% (1st)	38.5% (1st)
42	February 3, 2013	46.9% (1st)	47.9% (1st)	43.4% (1st)	43.5% (1st)
43	February 9, 2013	38.6% (1st)	39.0% (1st)	34.6% (1st)	34.5% (1st)
44	February 10, 2013	38.5% (1st)	38.8% (1st)	34.6% (1st)	34.7% (1st)
45	February 16, 2013	42.7% (1st)	43.4% (1st)	41.1% (1st)	41.8% (1st)
46	February 17, 2013	48.5% (1st)	49.3% (1st)	46.0% (1st)	45.8% (1st)
47	February 23, 2013	41.7% (1st)	42.9% (1st)	41.3% (1st)	41.7% (1st)
48	February 24, 2013	46.3% (1st)	48.3% (1st)	44.6% (1st)	45.0% (1st)
49	March 2, 2013	43.7% (1st)	43.8% (1st)	39.0% (1st)	39.7% (1st)
50	March 3, 2013	46.7% (1st)	47.6% (1st)	47.6% (1st)	47.7% (1st)
Average		35.8%	36.3%	33.3%	33.5%

== Awards and nominations ==
Year	Award	Category	Recipient	Result
2012	Korean Culture and Entertainment Awards	Popularity Award, Actor in a Drama	Lee Sang-yoon	Won
2012	KBS Drama Awards	Best Couple Award	Lee Sang-yoon and Lee Bo-young	Won
2012	KBS Drama Awards	Top Excellence Award, Actor	Chun Ho-jin	Nominated
2012	KBS Drama Awards	Top Excellence Award, Actress	Lee Bo-young	Nominated
2012	KBS Drama Awards	Excellence Award, Actor in a Serial Drama	Lee Sang-yoon	Nominated
2012	KBS Drama Awards	Excellence Award, Actress in a Serial Drama	Lee Bo-young	Nominated
2012	KBS Drama Awards	Best Supporting Actor	Park Hae-jin	Nominated
2012	KBS Drama Awards	Best Supporting Actress	Park Jung-ah	Nominated
2012	KBS Drama Awards	Best New Actor	Lee Jung-shin	Nominated
2012	KBS Drama Awards	Best New Actress	Choi Yoon-young	Nominated
2012	KBS Drama Awards	Best Young Actress	Lee Hye-in	Nominated
2013	2013 Baeksang Arts Awards	Best Actor	Lee Sang-yoon	Nominated
2013	2013 Baeksang Arts Awards	Best Actress	Lee Bo-young	Nominated
2013	2013 Baeksang Arts Awards	Best New Actor	Lee Jung-shin	Nominated
2013	2013 Baeksang Arts Awards	Best New Actress	Choi Yoon-young	Nominated
2013	Mnet 20's Choice Awards	20's Drama Star, Female	Lee Bo-young	Nominated
2013	Seoul International Drama Awards	Outstanding Korean Drama	Seoyoung, My Daughter	Nominated
2013	Seoul International Drama Awards	Outstanding Korean Drama OST	"Like Back Then" by Melody Day	Nominated
2013	Seoul International Drama Awards	Outstanding Korean Drama OST	"Quietly" by Go Yoo-jin	Nominated
2013	2013 Korea Drama Awards	Grand Prize/Daesang	Lee Bo-young	Won
2013	2013 Korea Drama Awards	Best Drama	Seoyoung, My Daughter	Won
2013	2013 Korea Drama Awards	Excellence Award, Actor	Lee Sang-yoon	Nominated
2013	2013 Korea Drama Awards	Best New Actor	Lee Jung-shin	Nominated
2013	2013 Korea Drama Awards	Best Writer	So Hyun-kyung	Nominated
2013	2013 APAN Star Awards	Top Excellence Award, Actress	Lee Bo-young	Won
2013	2013 APAN Star Awards	Best Writer	So Hyun-kyung	Won
2013	2013 APAN Star Awards	Excellence Award, Actor	Lee Sang-yoon	Nominated
2013	2013 APAN Star Awards	Acting Award, Actor	Chun Ho-jin	Nominated
