= Lee Hye-in (actress) =

South Korean actress (born 1995)

- Born: November 13, 1995 (age 30); Changwon, South Korea
- Occupation: Actress
- Years active: 2007–present
- Agent: Dear Ent

Korean name
- Hangul: 이혜인
- RR: I Hyein
- MR: I Hyein

Lee Hye-in (Korean: 이혜인; born November 13, 1995) is a South Korean actress.

== Filmography ==
=== Television series ===
Year	Title	Role	Network
2007	Ghost Pang Pang		SBS
2009	Heading to the Ground		MBC
2011	Warrior Baek Dong-soo	young Hwang Jin-joo	SBS
2012	Feast of the Gods	Go Joon-young's friend	MBC
2012	The Chaser	Baek Soo-jung	SBS
2012	Dream of the Emperor	young Chabi	KBS1
2012	Seoyoung, My Daughter	young Lee Seo-young	KBS2
2013	Gu Family Book	Gob Dan	MBC
2013	KBS Drama Special: "Family Bandage"	Lee Sun-woo	KBS2
2013	Master's Sun	Lee Eun-seol (guest, episode 2)	SBS
2013	Passionate Love	young Han Yoo-jung	SBS
2014	Wonderful Days	young Kang Dong-ok	KBS2
2015	Flower of Queen	Kang Eun-sol	MBC

=== Variety show ===
Year	Title	Notes
2008	UCC Scientific Expedition	MC
2010	Ggurugi Life Inquiry	

== Awards and nominations ==
Year	Award	Category	Nominated work	Result
2012	KBS Drama Awards	Best Young Actress	Seoyoung, My Daughter, Dream of the Emperor	Nominated
