= For Eagle Brothers =

2025 South Korean television series

- Promotional poster
- Hangul: 독수리 5형제를 부탁해!
- Lit.: Please Take Care of the Five Eagle Brothers!
- RR: Doksuri 5hyeongjereul butakhae!
- MR: Toksuri 5hyŏngjerŭl put'akhae!
- Genre: Family drama
- Written by: Goo Hyun-sook
- Directed by: Choi Sang-yeol
- Starring: Uhm Ji-won; Ahn Jae-wook; Choi Dae-chul; Kim Dong-wan; Yoon Park; Lee Seok-gi
- Music by: Choi In-hee
- Country of origin: South Korea
- Original language: Korean
- No. of episodes: 54

Production
- Executive producers: Lee Jeong-mi (CP); Lee Soo-yeon
- Producers: Kim Dong-gu; Lee Jin-ah; Kim Seung-ah; Lee Won-geon
- Running time: 70 minutes
- Production companies: DK E&M

Original release
- Network: KBS2
- Release: February 1 – August 3, 2025

For Eagle Brothers (Korean: 독수리 5형제를 부탁해!) is a 2025 South Korean television series starring Uhm Ji-won, Ahn Jae-wook, Choi Dae-chul, Kim Dong-wan, Yoon Park, and Lee Seok-gi. The series unfolds as the sister-in-law of the four brothers takes over the Eagle Brewery and becomes the family pillar after her husband's death. It aired on KBS2 from February 1, to August 3, 2025, every Saturday and Sunday at 20:00 (KST).

== Synopsis ==
For Eagle Brothers follows Ma Kwang-sook, who takes care of her late husband's siblings and is ready to take a risk to take over the Eagle Brewery. She meets Han Dong-seok, the CEO of LX Hotel, whom she frequently crosses paths with, and they unexpectedly become business partners and end up developing a lovely romantic relationship.

== Cast and characters ==
=== Main ===
- Uhm Ji-won as Ma Gwang-sook

- Ahn Jae-wook as Han Dong-seok

The chairman of LX Hotel.

- Choi Dae-chul as Oh Chun-soo

The second son of the Eagle Brewery.

- Kim Dong-wan as Oh Heung-soo

The third son of the Eagle Brewery.

- Yoon Park as Oh Beom-soo

The fourth son of the Eagle Brewery.

- Lee Seok-gi as Oh Kang-soo

The youngest son of the Eagle Brewery.

=== Supporting ===
- Lee Pil-mo as Oh Jang-soo

The eldest son of the Eagle Brewery.

- Park Joon-geum as Gong Joo-sil

Gwang-sook's mother.

- Kim Jun-bae as Ko Ja-dong

The manager of the Eagle Brewery Factory.

- Choi Byung-mo as Dokgo Tak

The founder of Silla Brewing.

- Bae Hae-sun as Jang Mi-ae

Tak's wife.

- Park Hyo-joo as Moon Mi-soon

The owner of a convenience store.

- Yoo In-young as Ji Gok-boon

The director of G-Hair, a leading K-beauty brand.

- Kim Seung-yoon as Han Bom

Dong-seok's daughter.

- Shin Seul-ki as Dokgo Se-ri

Tak's daughter.

- Yoon Jun-won as Han-gyeol

Dong-seok's son.

== Production ==
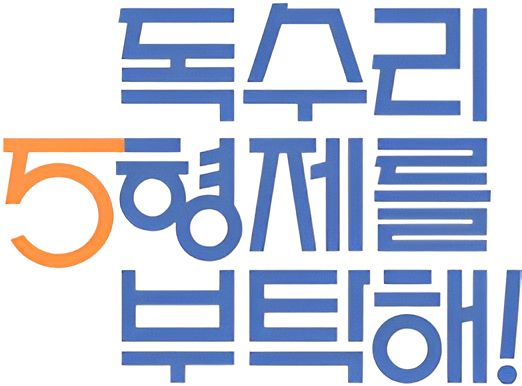

The series is written by Goo Hyun-sook, directed by Choi Sang-yeol, and produced by DK E&M.

On May 30, 2025, the series was extended for 4 additional episodes.

On September 19, 2024, Yoon Park, who had been offered, has decided to appear. On October 11, Uhm Ji-won was reportedly positively considering. On October 25, Kim Dong-wan is reported to appear. On December 16, Uhm and Ahn Jae-wook were reportedly confirmed their casting. According to Xports News on the same day, Yoo In-young has been cast as the lead. The next day, Lee Pil-mo, Choi Dae-chul, Kim, Yoon, and Lee Seok-gi were revealed as the lineup of the five brothers. On the following day, Park Joon-geum, Kim Jun-bae, Choi Byung-mo, and Bae Hae-sun is reported to appear. On the day after, Park Hyo-joo, Yoo, Kim Seung-yoon, and Shin Seul-ki were reportedly confirmed to appear.

== Viewership ==
For Eagle Brothers : South Korea viewers per episode (millions)

Episodes	Episode number																										
Episodes	1	2	3	4	5	6	7	8	9	10	11	12	13	14	15	16	17	18	19	20	21	22	23	24	25	26	27
1–27	2.859	3.140	2.921	3.427	2.984	3.381	3.022	3.537	3.040	3.484	3.188	3.625	3.054	3.688	3.337	3.720	3.243	3.889	3.375	3.821	3.482	3.856	3.388	3.821	3.385	3.901	3.243
28–54	3.150	3.245	3.627	3.376	3.555	3.721	3.704	3.441	3.928	3.507	3.920	3.250	4.011	3.639	3.667	3.446	3.779	3.271	3.848	3.552	3.960	3.642	3.664	3.430	3.700	3.362	3.866

Source: Audience measurement performed nationwide by Nielsen Korea.

Average TV viewership ratings
Ep.	Original broadcast date	Average audience share (Nielsen Korea)	
Ep.	Original broadcast date	Nationwide	Seoul
1	February 1, 2025	15.5% (1st)	14.7% (1st)
2	February 2, 2025	16.8% (1st)	15.9% (1st)
3	February 8, 2025	16.4% (1st)	14.7% (1st)
4	February 9, 2025	18.8% (1st)	17.7% (1st)
5	February 15, 2025	16.6% (1st)	15.8% (1st)
6	February 16, 2025	18.5% (1st)	17.3% (1st)
7	February 22, 2025	16.3% (1st)	14.4% (1st)
8	February 23, 2025	19.3% (1st)	18.0% (1st)
9	March 1, 2025	16.9% (1st)	15.3% (1st)
10	March 2, 2025	19.2% (1st)	17.2% (1st)
11	March 8, 2025	17.7% (1st)	16.3% (1st)
12	March 9, 2025	19.6% (1st)	18.1% (1st)
13	March 15, 2025	17.0% (1st)	15.2% (1st)
14	March 16, 2025	20.0% (1st)	18.4% (1st)
15	March 22, 2025	18.3% (1st)	17.1% (1st)
16	March 23, 2025	20.7% (1st)	19.1% (1st)
17	March 29, 2025	18.0% (1st)	16.3% (1st)
18	March 30, 2025	21.2% (1st)	19.4% (1st)
19	April 5, 2025	18.6% (1st)	17.3% (1st)
20	April 6, 2025	20.9% (1st)	19.0% (1st)
21	April 12, 2025	19.0% (1st)	18.2% (1st)
22	April 13, 2025	20.6% (1st)	19.5% (1st)
23	April 19, 2025	18.7% (1st)	17.7% (1st)
24	April 20, 2025	20.7% (1st)	19.2% (1st)
25	April 26, 2025	18.8% (1st)	17.3% (1st)
26	April 27, 2025	20.8% (1st)	19.6% (1st)
27	May 3, 2025	17.7% (1st)	16.7% (1st)
28	May 4, 2025	17.6% (1st)	16.7% (1st)
29	May 10, 2025	18.1% (1st)	17.4% (1st)
30	May 11, 2025	19.5% (1st)	18.2% (1st)
31	May 17, 2025	18.6% (1st)	18.1% (1st)
32	May 18, 2025	19.3% (1st)	18.0% (1st)
33	May 24, 2025	20.1% (1st)	18.7% (1st)
34	May 25, 2025	20.4% (1st)	19.4% (1st)
35	May 31, 2025	18.8% (1st)	17.6% (1st)
36	June 1, 2025	21.2% (1st)	19.7% (1st)
37	June 7, 2025	19.1% (1st)	17.9% (1st)
38	June 8, 2025	20.9% (1st)	19.5% (1st)
39	June 14, 2025	18.0% (1st)	16.4% (1st)
40	June 15, 2025	21.9% (1st)	20.3% (1st)
41	June 21, 2025	19.7% (1st)	18.1% (1st)
42	June 22, 2025	19.7% (1st)	18.4% (1st)
43	June 28, 2025	18.4% (1st)	16.9% (1st)
44	June 29, 2025	20.5% (1st)	18.6% (1st)
45	July 5, 2025	18.0% (1st)	16.5% (1st)
46	July 6, 2025	20.5% (1st)	18.5% (1st)
47	July 12, 2025	19.5% (1st)	18.0% (1st)
48	July 13, 2025	21.1% (1st)	19.4% (1st)
49	July 19, 2025	19.8% (1st)	18.6% (1st)
50	July 20, 2025	20.5% (1st)	18.5% (1st)
51	July 26, 2025	18.7% (1st)	17.1% (1st)
52	July 27, 2025	20.3% (1st)	18.8% (1st)
53	August 2, 2025	18.2% (1st)	16.7% (1st)
54	August 3, 2025	20.4% (1st)	18.5% (1st)
Average		—	—
In the table above, the blue numbers represent the lowest ratings and the red numbers represent the highest ratings.

== Accolades ==
=== Awards and nominations ===
Name of the award ceremony, year presented, category, nominee of the award, and the result of the nomination
Award	Year	Category	Recipient(s)	Result	Ref.
APAN Star Awards	2025	Top Excellence Award, Actor in a Serial Drama	Ahn Jae-wook	Won	
APAN Star Awards	2025	Excellence Award, Actor in a Serial Drama	Kim Dong-wan	Nominated	
APAN Star Awards	2025	Top Excellence Award ㅡ Actress in a Serial Drama	Uhm Ji-won	Won	
KBS Drama Awards	2025	Grand Prize (Daesang)	Ahn Jae-wook	Won	
KBS Drama Awards	2025	Grand Prize (Daesang)	Uhm Ji-won	Won	
KBS Drama Awards	2025	Excellence Award, Actress in a Serial Drama	Yoo In-young	Won	
KBS Drama Awards	2025	Excellence Award, Actor in a Serial Drama	Yoon Park	Won	
KBS Drama Awards	2025	Best Couple Award	Ahn Ji-wook	Won	
KBS Drama Awards	2025	Best Couple Award	Uhm Ji-won	Won	
KBS Drama Awards	2025	Best Supporting Actress	Park Joon-geum	Won	
KBS Drama Awards	2025	Best Supporting Actor	Kim Dong-wan	Won	
KBS Drama Awards	2025	Scriptwriter Award	Goo Hyun-sook	Won	
KBS Drama Awards	2025	Best New Actress	Shin Seul-ki	Won	
KBS Drama Awards	2025	Best New Actor	Lee Seok-gi	Won	
