= Han Eu-ddeum =

South Korean actress (born 1988)

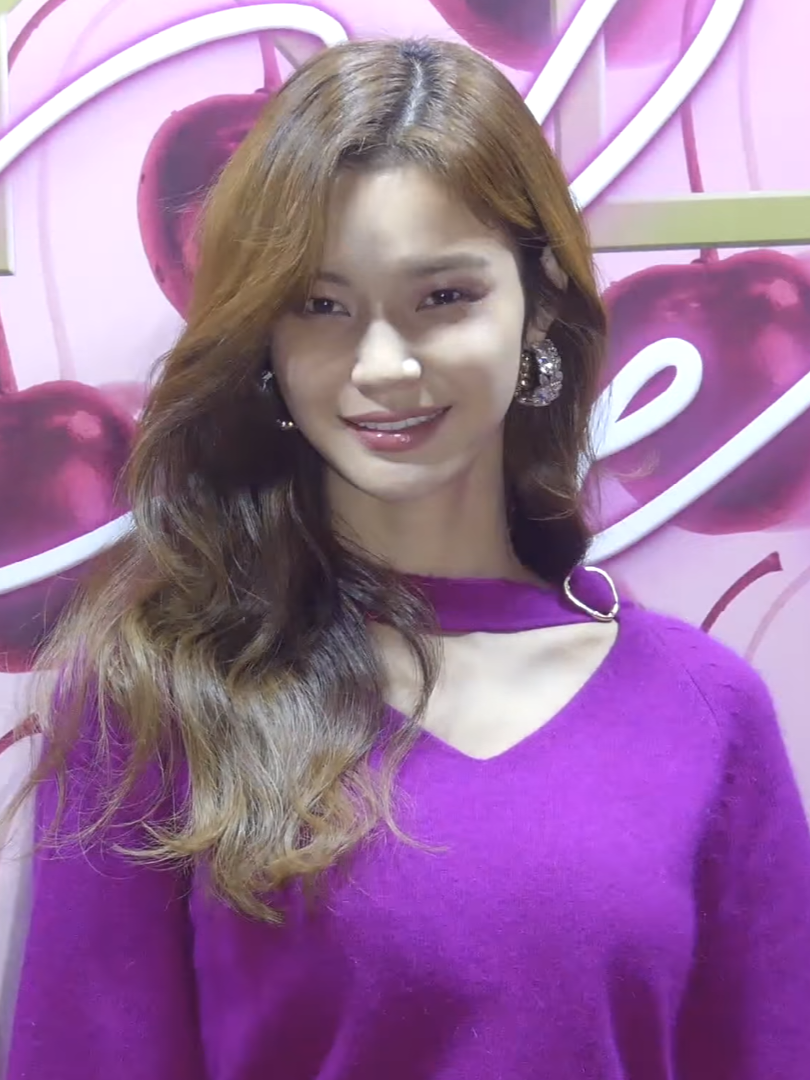
- Han in November 2018
- Born: October 7, 1988 (age 38); South Korea
- Other name: Han Eu-tteum
- Education: Baekseok Arts University
- Occupations: Actress; model
- Years active: 2003–present
- Agent: Sublime
- Spouse: Unknown (m. 2024)
- Children: 1

Korean name
- Hangul: 한으뜸
- RR: Han Eutteum
- MR: Han Ŭttŭm

Han Eu-ddeum (Korean: 한으뜸; born October 7, 1988) is a South Korean actress and model. She is known for her roles in dramas such as Righteous Love, Nevertheless and Celebrity. She also appeared in films including Revivre, and Gentleman.

== Career ==
Han was born on October 7, 1988. She began her career in 2003 by modeling for Kiki. Her commercial modeling career featured appearances in commercials for Galaxy S7 and Kit Kat. She made her acting debut playing Kim Yi-ri in the television series Righteous Love. She also played an unnamed advertising model candidate in the 2014 South Korean drama film Revivre.

In 2016, she became the exclusive advertising model for Banila Co. In the same year, she appeared on Star Pet Travel in ITALY.

In 2021, she was cast in the JTBC drama Nevertheless in the role of Min-young, a teaching assistant. She also appeared in the 2021 South Korean crime drama Gentleman as a law firm secretary.

In 2023, she starred in the Netflix drama Celebrity in which she played the role of a social media influencer named Angela. She also launched her own cosmetics brand named Cellre.

== Personal life ==
On May 9, 2024, Han's agency Sublime announced she was marrying an unnamed man on May 12. On July 10, 2024, Han announced her pregnancy on her Instagram.

== Filmography ==
=== Television series ===
Year	Title	Role	Ref.
2014	Righteous Love	Kim Yi-ri	
2021	Nevertheless	Jo Min-young	
2023	Celebrity	Angela	

=== Film ===
Year	Title	Role	Ref.
2014	Revivre	Advertising model candidate	
2022	Gentleman	Law firm secretary	

=== Music video appearances ===
Year	Song title	Artist	Ref.
2014	"Obsession"	Boyfriend	
2014	"Goodbye My Ray"	JACE	
2015	"Brawling"	Oh Hyuk & Primary	
2015	"Lemon"	Xuan Zhong Biao	
