= Call It Love (TV series) =

2023 South Korean television series

- Promotional poster
- Hangul: 사랑이라 말해요
- Hanja: 思量이라 말해요
- RR: Sarangira malhaeyo
- MR: Sarangira marhaeyo
- Genre: Melodrama; Romance
- Created by: Ahn Chang-hyun
- Developed by: Disney+
- Written by: Kim Ga-eun
- Directed by: Lee Kwang-young; Kim Ji-yeon
- Starring: Lee Sung-kyung; Kim Young-kwang
- Music by: Park Se-joon
- Country of origin: South Korea
- Original language: Korean
- No. of episodes: 16

Production
- Executive producers: Song Mi-joo; Kim Eun-ji
- Producers: Han Hye-yeon; Choi Myung-kyu; Bae Jun-o; Yoo Jeong-hwan; Kim Chu-seok; Hong Hyun-jae; Park Hae-min; Lee Yong-seok
- Cinematography: Jin Seung-hwan; Lee Seung-kyu
- Editor: Yoo Hyun-hye
- Production companies: Arc Media; Studio Santa Claus Entertainment; Culture & Story

Original release
- Network: Disney+
- Release: February 22 – April 12, 2023

Call It Love (Korean: 사랑이라 말해요) is a 2023 South Korean television series starring Lee Sung-kyung and Kim Young-kwang. It is a romantic melodrama about a woman whose life goes downhill after finding out about her father's affair and falling in love with his mistress's son. It aired on Disney+ from February 22 to April 12, 2023 in selected territories.

== Synopsis ==
Woo-joo's life hits rock bottom when she learns about her father's infidelity. After the father dies, she is kicked out of her family home by her father's mistress. Woo-joo plans to take revenge, but she falls in love with Dong-jin, the son of the mistress of her late father.

== Cast ==
=== Main ===
- Lee Sung-kyung as Shim Woo-joo

She is a contract intern at Choi Seon Exhibition. She practiced archery in middle school but had to quit due to an accident. Scarred by family issues, she vows revenge against Han Dong-jin, the son of a woman who ruined her and her family's lives. However, the more she learns about Dong-jin, the more conflicting emotions arise instead of revenge. Yet every time she feels a strange emotion towards him.

- Kim Young-kwang as Han Dong-jin

He is the CEO of Choi Seon Exhibition, an exhibition and trade fair company. He became a workaholic to cope with the loneliness of his life. After enduring heartbreak and solitude, his life changes when he meets Shim Woo-joo, a woman burning with a desire for revenge. He once loved camping but after his partner from a seven-year relationship unilaterally ended it, it turned traumatic and caused him to avoid camping for a while.

- Sung Joon as Yoon Jun

A pharmacist who runs a pharmacy. He lives in a tiled-roof house and generously provides a small room to the Shim siblings, who are without a home. He grew up under strict parents and has deep connections with Shim Woo-joo, forming a bond where they share all their secrets as a best friend and familial-like relationship. Additionally, he maintains friendships with Hye-seong and Ji-gu.

- Ahn Hee-yeon as Kang Min-yeong

She is Dong-jin's ex-girlfriend. The director of an art museum. Min-young unilaterally ended her relationship with Han Dongjin at a camping site. Despite their seven-year relationship, she ended up marrying someone else. In a provocative move, she even sent a wedding invitation to her ex-boyfriend. However, Min-young regrets the end of her relationship with Dongjin and moves back to the house across from his, where she used to live before studying abroad in the United States.

- Kim Ye-won as Shim Hye-seong

She is the eldest of the three Shim siblings, the older sister of Shim Woo-joo. She works as a bank officer with the rank of manager. She makes efforts in various ways to connect Dong-jin with Woo-joo, and at the same time, she approaches Su-ho, who works as a security guard at the bank.

=== Supporting ===
- Jang Sung Bum as Shim Ji-gu

Hye-seong and Woo-joo's younger brother and the youngest of the siblings. He decided that studying for the civil service exam wasn't suitable for him, so he quit and started earning pocket money through part-time jobs. He aims to become a singer, utilizing his talents. After running away from home, he lives at Dong-jin's house.

- Kim Hee-jung as Kim Hyun-joo

She is the mother of the Shim siblings.

- Jeon Seok-ho as Choi Sun-woo

Dong-jin's closest friend and co-CEO of the Choi Seon Exhibition. He and Min-young are close senior and junior colleagues.

- Seo Dong-won as Cha Young-min A Choi Seon Exhibition employee who left them for Shinwoo Fairs
- Park Jin-ah as Hyun Ji-hyung employee of the MGSF firm
- Yeon Je-hyung as Kang-gun
- Nam Gi-ae as Ma Hee-ja Han Dongjins mother and Shim Chulmin's mistress
- Jin So-yeon as Baek Soo-hee Team leader of Choi Seon Exhibition
- Sung young as Kim Yu-ri intern of Choi Seon Exhibition
- Ahn Nae-sang as Shim Chul-min the Shim siblings deceased father who left them to live with his mistress.
- Shin Mun-sung as Shin Sung-man: Ceo of Shinwoo Fairs who was trying to sabotage Han Dongjin's company.
- Seo Yi-seo as Park Su-ho security guard of the MGSF firm
- Lee Joon-hyeok as Kang Nam-il: Ma Hee-ja's new partner and gambler
- Yoon Bok-in as Yoon Jun's mother
- Kim Mi-hwa as Sim Woo-joo's aunt who owns a hairdressers
- Ko Kyu-pil as mart staff (cameo, episode 2)

== Episodes ==
Season	Episodes	Originally released	
Season	Episodes	First released	Last released
1	16	February 22, 2023	April 12, 2023

=== Season 1 (2023) ===
No. overall	No. in season	Original release date
1	1	February 22, 2023
Woo-joo loses her home to someone else, so she goes out to reclaim it. Dong-jin faces financial problems due to Shinwoo Fair's downright interference.
2	2	February 22, 2023
Best Fairs' business secrets are leaked while evidence points to Woo-joo as the culprit. A few days later, Woo-joo receives a phone call from Dong-jin.
3	3	March 1, 2023
Dong-jin makes an unexpected offer to Woo-joo. In the meantime, Dong-jin's ex-girlfriend, Minyoung, meets CEO Shin with plans to invest in Shinwoo Fair.
4	4	March 1, 2023
Ji-gu and Hae-sung get closer and closer to Dong-jin. Best Fairs' project is put on hold. Woo-joo has a secret rendezvous.
5	5	March 8, 2023
Dong-jin falls apart when he faces his painful past. Meanwhile, CEO Shin pushes ahead with the plan to destroy Best Fairs.
6	6	March 8, 2023
CEO Shin and Dong-jin's past are brought to the surface. As CEO Shin planned, Best Fairs is forced into a futile situation.
7	7	March 15, 2023
Woo-joo learns the truth about Dong-jin and decides to fix her mistakes. Meanwhile, Ji-gu is one step closer to finding out Dong-jin's identity.
8	8	March 15, 2023
Woo-joo is comforted by Dong-jin's words and asks Dong-jin for a favour. Shinwoo Fair is in a crisis after failing to receive the investment money.
9	9	March 22, 2023
CEO Shin tries to win over Woo-joo. Woo-joo and Dong-jin work as a team for an event. Meanwhile, CEO Shin's plan to destroy Best Fairs is held back.
10	10	March 22, 2023
Jun's concerns deepen when he discovers Woo-joo's unusual scars. Meanwhile, an unwelcome guest visits Best Fairs. Dong-jin makes an unusual decision.
11	11	March 29, 2023
Hyun-ju is in shock after finding out the truth. Woo-joo decides to fill her in on everything. Meanwhile, someone reveals Woo-joo's secret to Sun-woo.
12	12	March 29, 2023
A strange man shows up at Hyun-ju's house asking for a large amount of money, claiming that there is a way to get her house back.
13	13	April 5, 2023
Hae-sung finds out Woo-joo's secret and begins to look into Dong-jin's identity. Hee-ja sells the house in order to rid herself of the past.
14	14	April 5, 2023
Woo-joo confesses everything to Dong-jin and bids him farewell. Dong-jin goes out searching for Hee-ja to correct the past and learns a shocking fact.
15	15	April 12, 2023
Faced with the shocking truth, Dong-jin helps Woo-joo and asks Sun-woo for a favour. Hyun-ju and Hee-ja meet again for the first time in 13 years.
16	16	April 12, 2023
Just when Woo-joo and Dong-jin are ready to say goodbye, Woo-joo receives a call from Hee-ja. She heads to where Hee-ja is to settle their past.
