= Shin Jae-ha =

South Korean actor

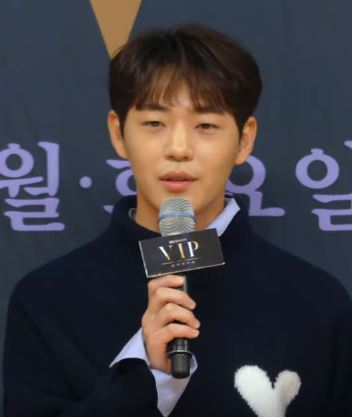
- Shin in 2019
- Born: April 2, 1993 (age 33); Suwon, Gyeonggi-do, South Korea
- Education: Dankook University
- Occupation: Actor
- Years active: 2013–present
- Agent: J-Wide Company

Korean name
- Hangul: 신재하
- RR: Sin Jaeha
- MR: Sin Chaeha
- Website: Official website

Shin Jae-ha (Korean: 신재하; born April 2, 1993) is a South Korean actor.

== Personal life ==
=== Military service ===
Shin enlisted in the mandatory military service on November 24, 2020. He was discharged on May 23, 2022, without returning to his unit in accordance with the Korean Republican Army's policy to prevent COVID-19.

== Filmography ==
=== Film ===
| Year | Title | Role | Ref. |
|---|---|---|---|
| 2014 | Futureless Things | Hyun-soo | |
| 2014 | Set Me Free | Beom-tae | |

=== Television series ===
| Year | Title | Role | Notes | Ref. |
|---|---|---|---|---|
| 2014 | Secret Love | | | |
| 2014–2015 | Pinocchio | young Ki Jae-myung / YGN Reporter | Cameo (ep. 20) | |
| 2014 | Forever Young | Hwang Ji-yong | | |
| 2015 | Hello Monster | Park Dae-young | Cameo (eps. 4, 5, 8 and 13) | |
| 2015 | Cheer Up! | Tae-pyung | | |
| 2015–2016 | Remember | Seol Min-soo | | |
| 2016 | Mystery Freshman | Kim Do-Yoon | | |
| 2016 | Memory | Kang Hyun-wook | | |
| 2016 | Page Turner | Seo Jin-mok | | |
| 2016 | Wanted | Lee Young-gwan | | |
| 2017 | While You Were Sleeping | Jung Seung-won | | |
| 2017–2018 | Prison Playbook | Kim Min-sung | | |
| 2017–2018 | Modulove | Min Han-Soo | Cameo (ep. 7) | |
| 2018 | A Poem a Day | Kim Nam-woo | | |
| 2018 | The Ghost Detective | Kim Gyeol | | |
| 2018 | The Hymn of Death | Yoon Ki-sung | | |
| 2018 | Memories of the Alhambra | Reporter | Cameo (ep. 12) | |
| 2019 | Welcome 2 Life | Yoon Pil-woo | | |
| 2019 | VIP | Ma Sang-woo | | |
| 2020 | My Unfamiliar Family | Kim Ji-woo | | |
| 2023 | Crash Course in Romance | Ji Dong-hee / Jeong Seong-hyeon | | |
| 2023 | Taxi Driver | On Ha-jun / Kim Dan-woo | Season 2 | |
| 2023 | Evilive | Han Beom-jae | | |
| 2026 | Still Shining | Bae Seong-chan | | |

=== Web series ===
| Year | Title | Role | Ref. |
|---|---|---|---|
| 2015 | Girl's Love Story | Shin Jae-ha | |
| 2016 | Gogh, The Starry Night | Oh Jung-min | |
| 2017 | Traces of the Hand | Kim Hong-sik | |

=== Television show ===
| Year | Title | Role | Notes | Ref. |
|---|---|---|---|---|
| 2016 | My Ear's Candy | Cast member | with Ji Soo, Nam Joo-hyuk and Kim Yoo-han | |

=== Music video appearances ===
| Year | Song title | Artist |
|---|---|---|
| 2017 | "The Love" | Buzz |

== Awards and nominations ==
Name of the award ceremony, year presented, category, nominee of the award, and the result of the nomination
| Award ceremony | Year | Category | Nominee / Work | Result | Ref. |
|---|---|---|---|---|---|
| SBS Drama Awards | 2019 | Best New Actor | VIP | Nominated | |
| SBS Drama Awards | 2023 | Excellence Award, Actor in a Seasonal Drama | Taxi Driver 2 | Won | |
| Seoul WebFest Awards | 2017 | Best Actor | Trace of the Hand | Won | |
