= My Unfamiliar Family =

2020 South Korean television series

- Promotional poster
- Hangul: (아는 건 별로 없지만) 가족입니다
- Lit.: (I Don't Know Much But) We Are Family
- RR: (Aneun geon byeollo eopjiman) gajogimnida
- MR: (Anŭn kŏn pyŏllo ŏpchiman) kajogimnida
- Genre: Family; Drama
- Created by: Studio Dragon
- Written by: Kim Eun-jung
- Directed by: Kwon Young-il
- Starring: Jung Jin-young; Won Mi-kyung; Choo Ja-hyun; Han Ye-ri; Shin Jae-ha; Kim Ji-seok
- Country of origin: South Korea
- Original language: Korean
- No. of episodes: 16

Production
- Running time: 70 minutes
- Production company: Studio Dragon

Original release
- Network: tvN
- Release: June 1 – July 21, 2020

My Unfamiliar Family (Korean: (아는 건 별로 없지만) 가족입니다) is a 2020 South Korean television series starring Jung Jin-young, Won Mi-kyung, Choo Ja-hyun, Han Ye-ri, Shin Jae-ha and Kim Ji-seok. It aired on tvN from June 1 to July 21, 2020.

== Cast ==
=== Main ===
- Jung Jin-young as Kim Sang-shik
  - Han Joon-woo as young Sang-shik
- Won Mi-kyung as Lee Jin-sook
  - Ah Young as young Jin-sook
- Choo Ja-hyun as Kim Eun-joo
- Han Ye-ri as Kim Eun-hee
- Shin Jae-ha as Kim Ji-woo
- Kim Ji-seok as Park Chan-hyuk

=== Supporting ===
- Park Sang-myun as Man-ho
- Jo Wan-gi as Young-shik
- Seo Sang-won as Yoo Sun-il
- Lee Ji-ha as Oh Mi-sook
- Kim Tae-hoon as Yoon Tae-hyung
- Lee Jong-won as Ahn Hyo-seok
- Bae Yoon-kyung as So-young
- Han Joon-woo as Kim Sang-shik
- Shin Dong-wook as Im Gun-joo
- Ga Deuk-hee as Seo Kyung-ok
- Shin Hye-jeong as Yoon Seo-young

=== Special appearances ===
- Kim Soo-jin as book author (Ep. 1 & 3)
- Choi Woong as Lee Jong-min (Ep. 1 & 7)
- Han Ji-wan as Hye-soo (Ep. 1)
- Park Hee-von as Ri-ra (Ep. 9)
- Oh Eui-shik as Woo-seok (Ep. 9)
- Baek Hyun-joo as Mr. Yoo's wife (Ep. 9)
- Woo Mi-hwa as Yoon Seo-young's mother (Ep. 3)

== Original soundtrack ==
My Unfamiliar Family OST

Soundtrack album by Various Artists
- Released: 2020
- Genre: Soundtrack
- Languages: Korean; English
- Label: Stone Music Entertainment

=== Part 1 ===
Released on June 9, 2020
No.	Title	Lyrics	Music	Artist	Length
1.	"Family" (가족입니다)	Dong Woo-seok; Yoo Jung-hyun	Dong Woo-seok; Yoo Jung-hyun	Bumkey	3:24
2.	"Family" (Inst.)		Dong Woo-seok; Yoo Jung-hyun		3:24
Total length:					6:48

=== Part 2 ===
Released on June 16, 2020
No.	Title	Lyrics	Music	Artist	Length
1.	"Love Message" (사랑한다는 말)	Hen	Hen	Sondia	4:10
2.	"Love Message" (Inst.)		Hen		4:10
Total length:					8:20

=== Part 3 ===
Released on June 30, 2020
No.	Title	Lyrics	Music	Artist	Length
1.	"My Day" (나의 하루)	Dinner Coat; Dong Woo-seok	Dinner Coat; Dong Woo-seok; Yoo Jung-hyun; Shim Jin; Song Hyun-jong	Gilgu Bonggu	3:58
2.	"My Day" (Ballad Ver.)	Dinner Coat; Dong Woo-seok	Dinner Coat; Dong Woo-seok; Yoo Jung-hyun; Shim Jin; Song Hyun-jong	Gilgu Bonggu	3:22
Total length:					7:20

=== Part 4 ===
Released on June 30, 2020
No.	Title	Lyrics	Music	Artist	Length
1.	"When We Were Close"	Nodded	Nodded; Han Jae-wan	Kang Seung-sik	3:43
2.	"When We Were Close" (Instrumental)	Nodded	Nodded; Han Jae-wan	Kang Seung-sik	3:43
Total length:					7:26

== Viewership ==
My Unfamiliar Family : South Korea viewers per episode (thousands)

Season	Episode number																Average
Season	1	2	3	4	5	6	7	8	9	10	11	12	13	14	15	16	Average
1	581	739	597	746	639	818	694	917	851	946	808	846	975	853	884	1024	807

Source: Audience measurement performed nationwide by Nielsen Korea.

Average TV viewership ratings
Ep.	Original broadcast date	Average audience share (Nielsen Korea)	
Ep.	Original broadcast date	Nationwide	Seoul
1	June 1, 2020	3.122%	3.426%
2	June 2, 2020	3.930%	4.520%
3	June 8, 2020	3.345%	3.248%
4	June 9, 2020	3.862%	4.528%
5	June 15, 2020	3.188%	3.376%
6	June 16, 2020	4.127%	4.897%
7	June 22, 2020	3.582%	4.016%
8	June 23, 2020	4.721%	5.599%
9	June 29, 2020	4.402%	5.018%
10	June 30, 2020	4.737%	5.294%
11	July 6, 2020	4.383%	5.035%
12	July 7, 2020	4.336%	5.385%
13	July 13, 2020	4.822%	5.690%
14	July 14, 2020	4.487%	5.504%
15	July 20, 2020	4.365%	4.914%
16	July 21, 2020	5.434%	6.198%
Average		4.178%	4.791%
In the table above, the blue numbers represent the lowest ratings and the red numbers represent the highest ratings.; This drama airs on a cable channel/pay TV which normally has a relatively smaller audience compared to free-to-air TV/public broadcasters (KBS, SBS, MBC and EBS).

== Awards and nominations ==
Year	Award	Category	Recipient	Result	Ref.
2021	57th Baeksang Arts Awards	Best Drama	My Unfamiliar Family	Nominated	
2021	57th Baeksang Arts Awards	Best Director (TV)	Kwon Young-il	Nominated	
2021	57th Baeksang Arts Awards	Best Screenplay (TV)	Kim Eun-jung	Nominated	
