= Mission: Possible =

South Korean action comedy film

- Theatrical release poster
- Hangul: 미션 파서블
- RR: Misyeon paseobeul
- MR: Misyŏn p'asŏbŭl
- Directed by: Kim Hyung-joo
- Screenplay by: Kim Hyung-joo
- Based on: Mission: Impossible by Bruce Geller
- Produced by: Song Chan-ho
- Starring: Kim Young-kwang; Lee Sun-bin
- Cinematography: Nam Hyun-woo
- Edited by: Heo Sun-mi
- Music by: Jung Ji-hoon
- Production company: Gnosis Company
- Distributed by: Merry Christmas Co. Ltd.
- Release date: February 17, 2021
- Running time: 105 minutes
- Country: South Korea
- Language: Korean
- Box office: US$3.5 million

Mission: Possible (Korean: 미션 파서블; RR: Misyeon paseobeul) is a 2021 South Korean action comedy film written and directed by Kim Hyung-joo. Based on the Mission: Impossible series by Bruce Geller, the film stars Kim Young-kwang and Lee Sun-bin in the lead roles. It follows the antics of secret agent Da-hee and an ex-special agent-turned-private detective Soo-han. The film was released in South Korea on February 17, 2021.

== Plot ==
The Chinese MSS receives vital information about an illegal supply of firearms from China to Korea where they send a rookie officer named Wong Iring to investigate and capture the smugglers. Iring's next plan is to infiltrate Korea as Yoo Da-Hee and meet a Korean special operative but ends up meeting a detective and former special forces soldier named Woo Soo-Han. Da-Hee tells Soo-Han about the mission and presents the target SI Chem Park Du-Sik, a rare-earth element importer from China, who is actually involved in arms smuggling. The duo follows Du-Sik to a cafè in Gangnam.

After a topsy-turvy ball dance, the duo manages to acquire his phone, only to find it is a flip phone. After keeping the phone back, Du-Sik receives a call and while chatting with someone, he gets killed with a dart and his death has been faked as a heart attack. The next day, Soo-Han and Da-Hee receive the news about the Rodeo mob boss has been shot while leaving his club. After interrogating a fortune teller advised by Soo-Han, the duo head to meet Rodeo boss rival Axe Clan where they meet the clan's boss, but are soon attacked by masked men. Soo-Han and Da-Hee escape, but not before retrieving the clan's boss's phone.

With the help of a hacker, the duo reaches the person's address where they find the person dead and deduce that he had been killed 3 days ago. The duo learns about the person's identity as Kim Yeong-Gu, the security head of Mugwang International and also learns about its execs Director Jeon-Hoon. Soo-Han remembers that Jeon-Hoon was the one who threatened Du-Sik after he had checked his phone. The duo learns that a party is held at Alvin Hotel the next day. Soo-Han and Da-Hee leave for the party. Despite knowing that Jeon-Hoon is their boss's killer, the Axe Clan makes an arms deal to sell arms at midnight. Soo-Han and Da-Hee are exposed where they are captured and brought to Jeon-Hoon, who orders Soo-Han to kill cops at a local police station in exchange for Da-Hee's life.

Soo-Han is escorted to the police station, but he injures Jeon-Hoon's men and reaches back to the hotel, only to find that Da-Hee is escorted somewhere. The cops arrest Soo-Han, and he is visited by the NIS, who learns about Da-Hee's real identity and that she is sent as a 'sacrifice' to die in the mission. Soo-Han escapes from the station and reaches the hideout where the deal between Jeon-Hoon and the Axe Clan is headed. Soo-Han frees Da-Hee and kills Xia-rong, one of the assassins Da-rong's brothers, which alerts the gangsters and they head to kill the duo. Soo-Han and Da-Hee manage to kill/arrest all the gangsters including Da-rong and Jeon-Hoon.

Later, Soo-Han gets arrested but is offered a deal by the NIS and MSS to become a secret agent in exchange for his release. Soo-Han agrees, and he, along with Da-Hee are sent to Russia for their next mission.

== Cast ==
- Kim Young-kwang as Woo Soo-han
- Lee Sun-bin as Wong Iring/Yoo Da-hee
- Oh Dae-hwan as Jeon-Hoon
- Seo Hyun-chul as Detective squad chief
- Choi Byung-mo as Team leader Cha Oh
- Kim Tae-hoon as Shin Ki-roo
- Na Kwang-hoon as Chinese MSS director
- Seo Beom-sik as Ax gang boss
- Woo Kang-min as Korean mercenary leader
- Jang Se-ah
- Park Ji-yeon as police woman
- Julien Kang as Yoo Ri
- Lee Do-gyeom as Hotel staff
- Shin Hye-jeong guest appearance
- Lee Joo-won as Do Doo-ho
- Hwang Jung-min as Dorothy
- Jang Won-young as Doctor
- Kim Ho-young as Shaman
- Hong Seok-cheon as Himself

== Production ==
=== Casting ===
The project was conceived in June 2019. Lee Sun-bin and Kim Young-kwang were cast in June 2019 to play secret agents in an action comedy.

=== Filming ===
The filming began on September 5, 2019 and was wrapped up on December 4, 2019.

== Reception ==
=== Box office ===
The film released on February 17, 2021 on 930 screens remained at the number 1 place at the Korean box office, for the first week of its release, collecting 26,000 audiences on first day, 23,000 persons on second day, 23,965 on the third day, 53,445 people on the 4th day, 52,969 people on the 5th day, 18,558 audiences on the 6th day, and 18,321 audiences on the 7th day, taking cumulative number of audiences to 217,766, according to Integrated Computer Network for Cinema Admission Tickets.

According to Korean Film Council data†, it is at 11th place among all the Korean films released in the year 2021, with gross of US$3.56 million and 447,111 admissions, as of December 11, 2021.

- †The system of KOBIS (Korean Box Office Information System) is managed by KOFIC.

=== Critical response ===
Going by Korean review aggregator Naver Movie Database, the film holds an approval rating of 8.41 from the audience.
