= Kim Ah-ra =

North Korean defector and actress (born 1993)

- Born: Kim Ah-ra; 7 September 1993 (age 32); Hoeryong, Kyongwon County, North Hamgyong Province, North Korea
- Other name: Kim A-ra
- Education: Myongji University, Kookmin University
- Occupations: Actress; Singer; Model
- Years active: 2011 – present
- Agent: Bless Entertainment
- Children: 1

Korean name
- Hangul: 김아라
- RR: Gim Ara
- MR: Kim Ara

Kim Ah-ra (Korean: 김아라; born September 7, 1991) is a South Korean television personality and actress and North Korean defector. She first gained national prominence on the reality talk show Now On My Way to Meet You before transitioning into a career as a dramatic actress in television and film.

== Early life and defection ==
Kim was born in Hoeryong, North Hamgyong Province, North Korea. Her childhood was marked by the extreme North Korean famine; she has recalled foraging for grass and roots to supplement meager rations of rice porridge. She did not receive a formal education during her youth in the North, instead spending her time scavenging for calories to help her family survive.

She eventually escaped North Korea at age 12, fleeing to China before finally settling in South Korea around 2009. Upon her arrival, she pursued higher education, attending Myongji University and Kookmin University.

== Career ==
=== 2011–2015: "Defector TV" and Early Media Appearances ===
Kim's entry into the entertainment industry was driven by the rise of "defector TV" in the 2010s. She became a regular cast member on the Channel A talk show Now On My Way to Meet You (2011–present), where her appearance and stories of survival earned her the nickname "the goddess of North Korean defectors".

=== 2016–Present: Acting and Breakthrough ===
In 2016, Kim transitioned into scripted acting with a minor role in the acclaimed horror film The Wailing. She gained wider recognition through supporting roles in several television dramas, frequently portraying North Korean characters or resilient young women.

Her most significant mainstream breakthrough occurred in the global hit series Crash Landing on You (2019–2020), where she played a North Korean village resident. Kim notably influenced the production by proposing authentic North Korean dialogue based on her own experiences.

== Personal life ==
In October 2023, Kim married a non-celebrity whom she met at her church. The couple held a private wedding ceremony in Seoul on October 28, 2023. She remains active in the South Korean entertainment industry, continuing to use her platform to humanize the lives of North Korean defectors.

== Filmography ==
=== Television series ===
Year	Title	Role	Ref.
2015	Someone I Know	Kim Yeon-hee	
2017	Calm Down Cheon Doong	Ah-ra	
2017	Ugly Miss Young-ae	Mi-na	
2018	Tempted	Bing Bing	
2019	Crash Landing on You	North Korean Village Housewife	
2023	DMZ Daeseongdong	Na-ri	

=== Film ===
Year	Title	Role	Ref.
2016	The Wailing	Dermatology Nurse	
2018	The Soul-Mate	So-young	
2020	Sixball	Choi Seo-kyeong	
2022	Honest Candidate 2	Announcer from the North	

== Ambassadorship ==
- Ambassador for the North Korean Human Rights International Film Festival
- 2018 Rotary International District 3640 Friendship Exchange Committee Ambassador
- 2018 World Peace Culture Festival Organizing Committee Overseas Promotion Delegation Member

== Awards and nominations ==
Name of the award ceremony, year presented, category, nominee of the award, and the result of the nomination
Award ceremony	Year	Category	Nominee / Work	Result	Ref.
24th Korea Culture and Entertainment Awards Multi-Channel Network Award	2016	Masterpiece Brand Special Award	Now On My Way to Meet You	Won	
