= An Ethics Lesson =

- Hangul: 분노의 윤리학
- Lit.: The Ethics of Anger
- RR: Bunnoui yullihak
- MR: Punnoŭi yullihak
- Directed by: Park Myoung-rang
- Written by: Park Myoung-rang
- Produced by: Jeong Won-chan; Kim Hyeon-seok
- Starring: Lee Je-hoon; Cho Jin-woong; Kim Tae-hoon; Kwak Do-won; Moon So-ri
- Cinematography: Kim Woo-hyung
- Edited by: Kim Sun-min
- Music by: Jeong Jung-han
- Production companies: TPS Company; Saram Entertainment
- Distributed by: Lotte Entertainment
- Release date: February 21, 2013
- Running time: 110 minutes
- Country: South Korea
- Language: Korean
- Box office: US$1.5 million

An Ethics Lesson (Korean: 분노의 윤리학; RR: Bunnoui yullihak; lit. 'The Ethics of Anger') is a 2013 South Korean mystery thriller film starring Lee Je-hoon, Cho Jin-woong, Kim Tae-hoon, Kwak Do-won and Moon So-ri. Written and directed by Park Myoung-rang, the crime thriller centers on four suspicious men involved in a college girl's murder.

== Plot ==
A beautiful college girl is murdered. Upon her death, the men in her life become aware of each other's existence. A wire-tapping neighbor, a loan shark, her adulterous lover, and her righteous ex reveal their true nature, dragging all of them further down to the ruthless abyss.

== Cast ==
- Lee Je-hoon as Kim Jung-hoon, a policeman
- Cho Jin-woong as Park Myung-rok, a loan shark
- Kim Tae-hoon as Han Hyun-soo, the ex-boyfriend
- Kwak Do-won as Kim Soo-taek, a professor
- Moon So-ri as Kim Sun-hwa, Soo-taek's wife
- Ko Sung-hee as Jin-ah
- Han Seung-yong as Min-tae
- Park Byung-eun as Lee Ji-hoon, a photographer
- Lee Na-ra as Eun-young
- Lee Sae-byul as Ji-yeon
- Lee Seung-joon as Investigator for the prosecution
- Choi Gwang-il as Defense lawyer Choi
- Lee Dong-ha as Prosecutor Im
- Kim Gi-cheon as Security guard
- Min Bok-gi as GG boss
- Park Gil-soo as Owner of electronics store
- Jin Yong-wook as Detective Moon
