= Room No. 9 =

2018 South Korean television series

- Promotional poster
- Also known as: Room 9; Room N9
- Hangul: 나인룸
- Lit.: Room Nine
- RR: Nain rum
- MR: Nain rum
- Genre: Mystery; Fantasy
- Created by: Lee Han-ho
- Written by: Jeong Sung-hee
- Directed by: Ji Young-soo
- Starring: Kim Hee-sun; Kim Hae-sook; Kim Young-kwang
- Music by: Movie Colser
- Country of origin: South Korea
- Original language: Korean
- No. of episodes: 16

Production
- Executive producers: Kim Nam-pyo; Lee Chan-ho; Sohn Ki-won
- Producer: Kim Na-kyung
- Running time: 60 minutes
- Production companies: Kim Jong-hak Production; Studio Dragon (planner)

Original release
- Network: tvN
- Release: October 6 – November 25, 2018

Room No. 9 (Korean: 나인룸) is a 2018 South Korean television series starring Kim Hee-sun, Kim Hae-sook and Kim Young-kwang. It aired on tvN from October 6 to November 25, 2018, every Saturday and Sunday at 21:00 (KST).

== Synopsis ==
The story of two women whose fate is switched as they exchange bodies, and a man who holds the key to that fate.

== Cast ==
=== Main ===
- Kim Hee-sun as Eulji Hae-yi, a beautiful but manipulative lawyer who has a 100 percent success rate in court.
- Kim Hae-sook as Jang Hwa-sa, a death-row convict who is the infamous killer behind a poison murder case.
- Kim Young-kwang as Gi Yoo-jin / young (real) Gi San, Hae-yi's boyfriend who is a family doctor. He seems to be smart and gentle but he hides an inner dark side.

=== Supporting ===
- Lee Geung-young as Gi San, Yoo-jin's half-brother who hides a secret from his past.
- Oh Dae-hwan as Oh Bong-sam, an investigator.
- Kim Si-eun as Kim Hye-sun
- Jung Jae-won as Gi Chang-sung, Gi San's son who lives a lawless lifestyle.
- Kim Jae-hwa as Kam Mi-ran
- Jung Won-jong as Ma Hyun-chul
- Im Won-hee as Bang Sang-soo
- Jung Yeon-joo as Han Hyun-hee
- Kang Shin-il as Eulji Sung
- Son Sook as Jang Hwa-sa's mother
- Son Byong-ho as Kim Jong-soo
- Min Sung-wook as So Young-chul

=== Special appearance ===
- Yoon Park as Chu Young-bae
- Song Yoon-ah as Park Hyun-jung

== Original soundtrack ==
Room No. 9 OST

Soundtrack album by Various artists
- Recorded: 2018
- Genre: Soundtrack
- Languages: Korean; English
- Labels: Genie Music; Stone Music Entertainment

=== Part 1 ===
Released on October 21, 2018
No.	Title	Lyrics	Music	Artist	Length
1.	"Life Answers" (삶이 대답한다)	Ha Melli	Lee Sang-hoon	Lim Jeong-hee	04:00
2.	"Life Answers" (Inst.)		Lee Sang-hoon		04:00
Total length:					08:00

=== Part 2 ===
Released on November 4, 2018
No.	Title	Lyrics	Music	Artist	Length
1.	"Rewind"	Hard Carry	Hard Carry	Navi	03:26
2.	"Rewind" (Inst.)		Hard Carry		03:26
Total length:					06:52

== Viewership ==
Room No. 9 : South Korea viewers per episode (thousands)

Season	Episode number																Average
Season	1	2	3	4	5	6	7	8	9	10	11	12	13	14	15	16	Average
1	1421	1224	991	1280	765	960	888	927	801	954	709	926	718	957	783	1137	965

Source: Audience measurement performed nationwide by Nielsen Korea.

Average TV viewership ratings
Ep.	Original broadcast date	Average audience share (Nielsen Korea)	
Ep.	Original broadcast date	Nationwide	Seoul
1	October 6, 2018	6.155%	7.164%
2	October 7, 2018	5.413%	6.260%
3	October 13, 2018	4.785%	5.537%
4	October 14, 2018	5.602%	6.878%
5	October 20, 2018	3.464%	3.844%
6	October 21, 2018	4.531%	5.702%
7	October 27, 2018	3.862%	4.919%
8	October 28, 2018	4.226%	4.926%
9	November 3, 2018	4.041%	4.965%
10	November 4, 2018	4.384%	5.092%
11	November 10, 2018	3.516%	3.968%
12	November 11, 2018	4.643%	5.342%
13	November 17, 2018	3.071%	3.542%
14	November 18, 2018	4.653%	5.420%
15	November 24, 2018	3.744%	4.485%
16	November 25, 2018	5.229%	5.916%
Average		4.457%	5.120%
In the table above, the blue numbers represent the lowest ratings and the red numbers represent the highest ratings.; This series aired on a cable channel/pay TV which normally has a relatively smaller audience compared to free-to-air TV/public broadcasters (KBS, SBS, MBC and EBS).
