= Gogh, The Starry Night =

Chinese-South Korean web-drama

- Official Poster
- Hangul: 고호의 별이 빛나는 밤에
- RR: Gohoui byeori binnaneun bame
- MR: Kohoŭi pyŏri pinnanŭn pame
- Genre: Romantic Comedy, Drama
- Written by: Sin Yoo-dam
- Directed by: Jo Soo-won; Kim Young-hwan
- Creative directors: Ji Ba-wi; Lee So-jin
- Starring: Kwon Yu-ri; Kim Young-kwang; Lee Ji-hoon
- Composers: Jung Jae-woo; Kang Hwi-chan; Jung Cha-shik; Lee Kyung-shik; Choi Sung-hun
- Country of origin: South Korea
- Original language: Korean
- No. of episodes: 20 (Sohu TV); 4 (SBS)

Production
- Executive producers: Kim Hun; Coco Ma
- Producers: Son Gi-won; Charles Zhang
- Cinematography: Choi Sung-ho; Kil Sang-su
- Running time: 20 minutes
- Production companies: Kim Jong-hak Production; Sohu

Original release
- Network: Sohu TV
- Release: July 2 – July 31, 2016
- Network: SBS
- Release: October 22 – October 30, 2016

Gogh, The Starry Night (Korean: 고호의 별이 빛나는 밤에) is a Chinese-South Korean web-drama starring Kwon Yu-ri, Kim Young-kwang and Lee Ji-hoon. It was broadcast on Sohu TV every Saturday and Sunday at 00:00 from July 2, 2016.

The drama also aired on SBS on Saturdays and Sundays at 22:00 on October 22 as a 4-episode mini drama, after Second to Last Love ended.

== Synopsis ==
The web-drama depicts a story of a 29-year-old employee 'Go Ho' (Kwon Yuri) of an advertising company who works hard but hardly praised by her hot-tempered boss (Kim Young Kwang). As a result, she dislikes her boss very much, not understanding his unspoken love for her. In the meantime, her ex-boyfriend (Lee Ji-hoon) joins the same company, and she gets transferred to his work unit. The plot revolves around the two male leads trying to win the heart of Go Ho.

== Cast ==
=== Main ===
- Kwon Yu-ri as Go-ho
- Kim Young-kwang as Kang Tae-ho
- Lee Ji-hoon as Hwang Ji-hoon

=== Supporting ===
- Shin Jae-ha as Oh Jung-min
- Choi Deok-moon as Director Choi Chang-seob
- Kang Rae-yeon as Lee Hee-yeon
- Go Geon-han as Seo-won
- Kim Ji-hoon as Park Jin-woo
- Hwang Young-hee as Lee Chung-kyung (Go-ho's mother)
- Min Sung-wook as Director Seo Gook-jin
- Jang Sung-won as Go Kang (Go-ho's brother)

=== Guests ===
- Jin Kyung as Creative Director Yoon (Ep. 1 & 13-14)
- Lee Dong-jin as Go-ho's father (Ep. 1, 14 & 18-19)
- Kim Kwang-kyu (Ep. 1-2)
- Park Seul-gi as Editor Park Seul-gi (Ep. 2 & 15)
- Lee Jong-suk as Song Dae-gi (Ep. 5)
- Park Shin-hye as convenience store cashier (Ep. 8)
- Park Joon-geum as Madam Joo (Ep. 9)
- Park Young-soo as Chef (Ep. 9)
- Yoon Kyun-sang as Police Officer (Ep. 18)

== Ratings ==
- The blue numbers represent the lowest ratings and the red numbers represent the highest ratings
- NR denotes that the drama did not rank in the Top 20 daily programs on that date.

Episode #	Original broadcast date	Average audience share			
Episode #	Original broadcast date	TNmS Ratings		AGB Nielsen	
Episode #	Original broadcast date	Nationwide	Seoul National Capital Area	Nationwide	Seoul National Capital Area
1	October 22, 2016	4.2% (NR)	5.1% (NR)	4.4% (NR)	5.8% (NR)
2	October 23, 2016	3.2% (NR)	6.8% (NR)	4.8% (NR)	7.2% (NR)
3	October 29, 2016	3.5% (NR)	5.9% (NR)	4.0% (NR)	5.6% (NR)
4	October 30, 2016	2.7% (NR)	6.2% (NR)	3.4% (NR)	6.4% (NR)
Average		3.4%	6.0%	4.2%	6.3%

== Original soundtracks ==
No.	Title	Artists	Length
1.	"Star Candy" (별사탕)	Lee Da-yun	3:24
2.	"Dreamer" (Korean Ver.)	Romantisco feat. EDEN	3:10
3.	"Bad Crowd"	Romantisco	3:08
4.	"Bad Timing"	Romantisco	2:21
5.	"Break"	Kang Hee-chan	1:31
6.	"Balance"	Jung Cha-shik	2:38
7.	"Candy Banjo"	Lee Sang-yoo	2:33
8.	"Candy Gt"	Jung Jae-woo	3:31
9.	"Candy Pizzi"	Lee Sang-yoo	1:55
10.	"Candy Waltz"	Lee Sang-yoo	2:16
11.	"Good And Bad"	Jung Jae-woo	2:47
12.	"Hard Wall"	Romantisco	1:26
13.	"In And Out"	Kang Hee-chan	1:18
14.	"Intermezzo"	Kang Hee-chan	1:17
15.	"Messenser"	Jung Cha-shik	2:39
16.	"Office Die"	Jung Cha-shik	2:43
17.	"Office"	Lee Kyung-shik	2:58
18.	"Silent View"	Jung Jae-woo	3:27
19.	"So Pathetic"	Lee Kyung-shik	2:25
20.	"That's Comedy"	Lee Kyung-shik	1:56
21.	"Watch Out"	Jung Jae-woo	1:29
22.	"Star Candy" (별사탕)	Kim Young-kwang	3:22
23.	"Dreamer" (English Ver.)	Romantisco	3:10
24.	"Star Candy" (Inst.)	Lee Da-yun	3:24
25.	"Dreamer" (Inst.)	Romantisco	3:10
26.	"Star Candy" (Inst.)	Kim Young-kwang	3:23

== Awards and nominations ==
Year	Award	Category	Recipient	Result
2017	5th Annual DramaFever Awards	Best SNS Drama	Gogh, The Starry Night	Won
