= Oh Dae-hwan =

South Korean actor (born 1979)

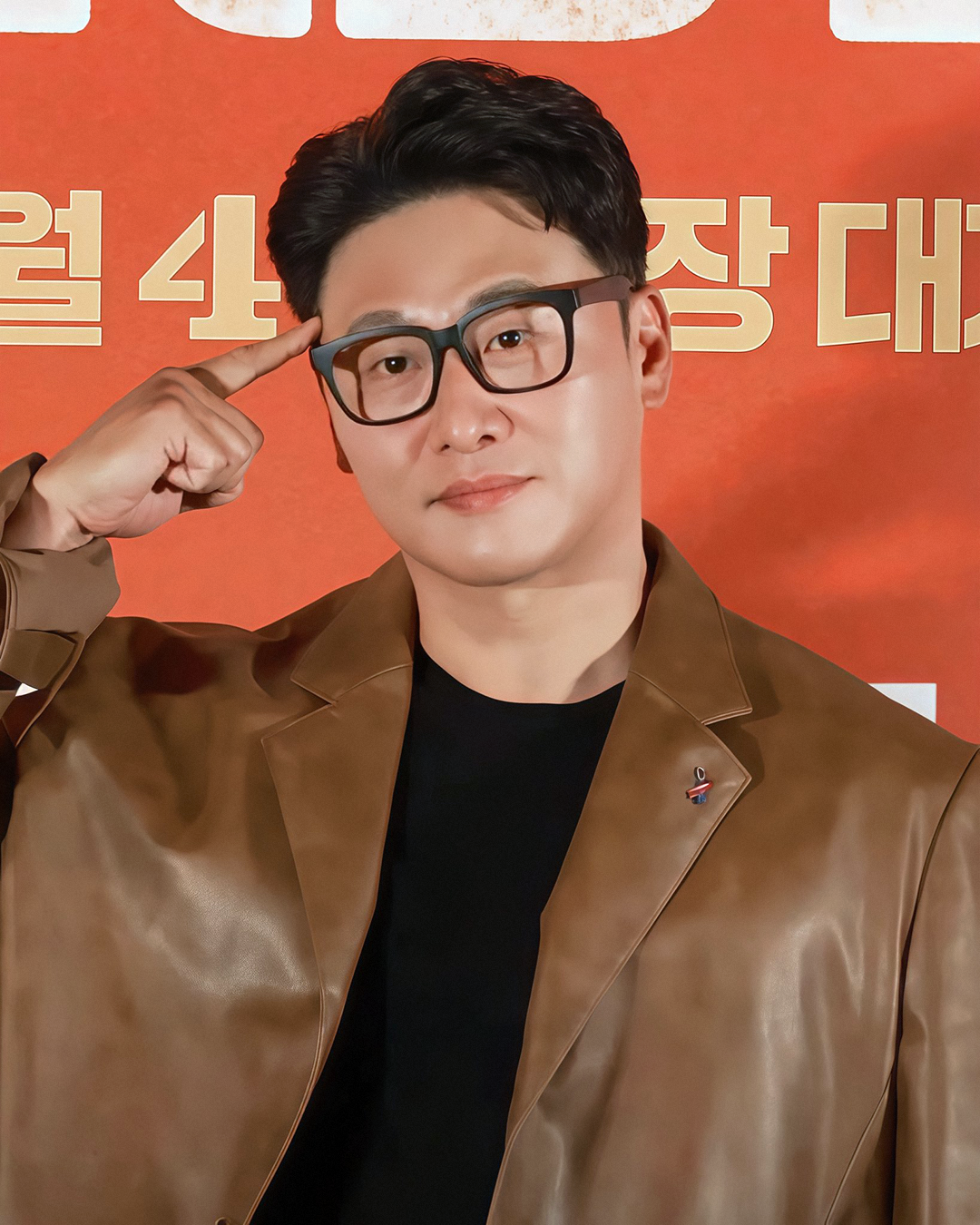
- Oh in 2024
- Born: July 5, 1979 (age 47); Cheonan, South Chungcheong Province, South Korea
- Education: Korea National University of Arts
- Occupation: Actor

Korean name
- Hangul: 오대환
- RR: O Daehwan
- MR: O Taehwan

Oh Dae-hwan (born July 5, 1979) is a South Korean actor. He appeared in television series such as Squad 38 (2016), Shopping King Louie (2016), Radiant Office (2017), The Red Sleeve (2021), and Mr. Plankton (2024).

== Filmography ==
=== Film ===
Key
†	Denotes films that have not yet been released

Year	Title	Role	Notes	Ref.
2013	Montage	Yong-sik		
2013	Go, Stop, Murder	Kim Moo-shik		
2015	Coin Locker Girl	Bruiser		
2015	The Deal	Kal-chi		
2017	The King	Song Baek-ho		
2018	The Great Battle	Hwal-bo		
2020	Deliver Us From Evil	Han Jong-su		
2021	Mission: Possible	Jeon Hoon		
2021	Tomb of the River	Hyeong-geun		
2022	Come Back Home	Tae-kyu		
2022	Daemuga	Detective	Special appearance	
2023	Devils	Jae-hwan		
2023	The Wild	Do-sik		
2024	I, the Executioner	Detective Wang		
2024	The Firefighters	Ahn Hyo-jong		
TBA	Mismatch †	Bong-su		

=== Television ===
Key
†	Denotes television productions that have not yet been released

Year	Title	Role	Notes	Ref.
2015	Flower of Queen	Ma Chang-soo		
2015	I'm After You	Detective Lim Chul-ho		
2016	Come Back Mister	Na Suk-chul		
2016	Squad 38	Ma Jin-seok		
2016	Shopping King Louie	Jo In-sung		
2017	Innocent Defendant	Cheon Pil-jae aka Bundle		
2017	Radiant Office	Lee Yong-jae		
2017	Live Up to Your Name	Doo-chil		
2018	Return	Kim Jung-soo		
2018	Life on Mars	Lee Yong-gi		
2018	Room No. 9	Oh Bong-sam		
2019	Special Labor Inspector	Goo Dae-gil		
2019	Catch the Ghost	Kim Won-tae		
2020	Once Again	Song Joon-sun		
2021	The Red Sleeve	Kang Tae-ho		
2022	Adamas	Team Leader A		
2022	Poong, the Joseon Psychiatrist	Physician	Cameo (episode 1)	
2022	May I Help You?	Michael Baek		
2025	My Troublesome Star	Kang Du-won		
2026	The Ordinary Jackpot	Jeong Seon-hyuk		

=== Web series ===
Year	Title	Role	Notes	Ref.
2022	Shadow Detective	Ma Sang-gu	Season 1	

=== Television show ===
Year	Title	Notes/Ref.
2017	Rural Police	Seasons 1–4
2018	Rural Police	Seasons 1–4
2019	Law of The Jungle in Myanmar and Myeik	Episodes 378–380, 382
2019	Law of the Jungle in Sunda Islands	Episodes 388–392
2022	The Backpacker Chef	Cast member
2022	Accapella	Cast member
2023	Black: I Saw the Devil	Cast member; Crime Thriller Crime Documentary (Season 2)

== Awards and nominations ==
Year	Award	Category	Nominated work	Result	Ref.
2011	Mise-en-scène Short Film Festival	Special Prize of Judge	—N/a	Won	
2017	SBS Drama Awards	Best Supporting Actor	Innocent Defendant	Nominated	
2018	23rd Chunsa Film Art Awards	Popularity Award	—N/a	Won	
2018	26th Korea Culture Entertainment Awards	Best Supporting Actor Award	—N/a	Won	
2018	2018 SBS Drama Awards	Best Supporting Actor	Return	Nominated	
2021	2021 MBC Drama Awards	Best Supporting Actor	The Red Sleeve	Nominated	
2023	Scene Stealer Festival	Bonsang "Main Prize"	The Red Sleeve	Won	
