= The Soul-Mate =

- Theatrical release poster
- Hangul: 원더풀 고스트
- RR: Wondeopul goseuteu
- MR: Wŏndŏp'ul kosŭt'ŭ
- Directed by: Jo Won-hee
- Written by: Kim Sung-jin
- Produced by: Kim Sung-jin
- Starring: Ma Dong-seok; Kim Young-kwang; Lee Yoo-young
- Cinematography: Ha Kyung-ho
- Edited by: Park Kyung-sook; Choi Min-young
- Music by: Mok Young-jin
- Production company: DayDream Entertainment
- Distributed by: CJ Entertainment
- Release date: September 26, 2018
- Running time: 97 minutes
- Country: South Korea
- Language: Korean
- Box office: US$3.3 million

The Soul-Mate (also known as Wonderful Ghost) is a 2018 South Korean comedy-drama film directed by Jo Won-hee. The film stars Ma Dong-seok, Kim Young-kwang and Lee Yoo-young. It was released on September 26, 2018.

== Plot summary ==
A judo instructor named Jang-su, thinks only about taking care of his daughter after losing his wife. But his life suddenly turns upside down when he becomes haunted by a soul named Tae-jin, an over-enthusiastic police officer who gets into a coma during a case investigation. Tae-jin, who can't stand injustice constantly convinces Jang-su to help him investigate his unsolved case where they embark on a dangerous journey.

== Cast ==
- Ma Dong-seok as Jang-su
- Kim Young-kwang as Tae-jin
- Lee Yoo-young as Hyeon-ji
- Choi Gwi-hwa as Jong-sik
- Joo Jin-mo as Police inspector Yang
- Choi Yoo-ri as Do-kyung, Jang-su's daughter
- Bae Jung-hwa as Do-kyung's mother
- Kim Ah-ra as So-yeong
- Yoon Hee-won as Section chief Lee (cameo)
- Ye Jung-hwa as Beautiful woman passing by (cameo)
- Ko Kyu-pil as Bong Goo

== Production ==
Principal photography began on August 10, 2016, and wrapped on October 10, 2016.

== Release ==
The film was released in South Korea on September 26, 2018, with age 12-rating.

Due to a competitive week from late September to early October (Chuseok holidays in South Korea), the film failed to secure more screens and was released on V.O.D on October 12, 2018, only 16 days after its theatrical release.

== Reception ==
On its opening day, the film finished fourth at the box office, attracting 163,647 moviegoers and grossing US$1.1 million. During its opening weekend, the film finished in fourth place, grossing US$1.4 million from 172,082 attendance. The film dropped to eighth place during its second weekend, grossed US$91,904 from 12,102 attendance, 95% lower gross compared to its debut weekend.

As of October 7, 2018, the film earned US$3.3 million gross from 450,106 total attendance.
