= Kim Tae-hoon (actor) =

South Korean actor (born 1975)

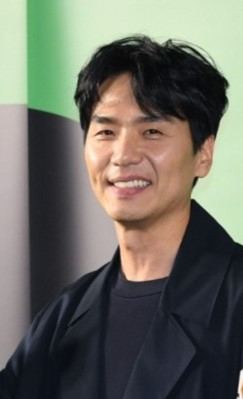
- Kim in April 2023
- Born: May 26, 1975 (age 51); Seocho-gu, Seoul, South Korea
- Education: Hanyang University (Theater and Film)
- Occupation: Actor
- Years active: 1997–present
- Agent: L' July Entertainment
- Family: Kim Tae-woo (brother)

Korean name
- Hangul: 김태훈
- Hanja: 金太勳
- RR: Gim Taehun
- MR: Kim T'aehun

Kim Tae-hoon (born May 26, 1975) is a South Korean actor. Kim graduated from Hanyang University, then began his acting career with the Hanyang Repertory Theatre in 1997. Onscreen, he has played leading roles in indie films such as Way to Go, Rose (2006), The Pit and the Pendulum (2009) and When Winter Screams (2013). Kim also stars in mainstream films and television dramas such as The Man from Nowhere (2010), You're So Pretty (2011), The Innocent Man (2012), An Ethics Lesson (2013), and Pure Love (2013).

His older brother Kim Tae-woo is also an actor.

== Filmography ==
=== Film ===
Year	Title	Role	Notes/Ref.
2002	Are You Seeing Anyone	Tae-hoon	short film
2005	Mr. Housewife	AD Cheon	
2006	Way to Go, Rose	Kang Nam-dae	
2009	The Origin of Water	Kim Joong-bae	
2009	Q & A	Man in the audience	short film
2009	6 Hours	Taxi driver Sun-woo	short film
2009	The Pit and the Pendulum	Sang-tae	
2010	Parallel Life	Jung Min-soo (cameo)	
2010	Short! Short! Short! 2010: Fantastic Theater	Director Kim	segment: "Ten Million"
2010	The Man from Nowhere	Detective Kim Chi-gon	
2011	Detective K: Secret of the Virtuous Widow	Im Geo-seon	
2011	If You Were Me 5	In-kwon	segment: "Her Story Taking"
2011	Shotgun Love	PD Park	
2012	Ghost Sweepers	Young male ghost	Special appearance
2012	A Stranger	Cold man	short film
2013	South Bound	Teacher Lee	
2013	An Ethics Lesson	Han Hyun-soo	
2013	When Winter Screams	Yeon-soo	
2014	Gyeongju	Detective Lee Young-min	
2014	The Admiral: Roaring Currents	Kim Jung-geol	
2015	The Long Way Home	General Jo	Special appearance
2015	The Sound of a Flower	Low level official	
2016	Snow Paths	Jeong-woo	
2016	Trick	Do-joon	
2016	A Quiet Dream	Tae-hoon	Special appearance
2017	Glass Garden	Ji-hoon	
2018	Love+Sling	Seung-hyuk	
2018	The Pension	Man	
2019	Mal-Mo-E: The Secret Mission	Park-hoon	
2021	Mission: Possible	Shin Ki-roo	
2021	A Good Person	Kyung-seok	
2022	Excellence	Jo Moon-gil	
TBA	Taste of Horror – The Beginning		Short Film
TBA	Dream Palace		

=== Television series ===
Year	Title	Role	Notes/Ref.
2006	Goodbye Solo	Shin Sik	
2006	Drama City "While the Memory Is Asleep"	Sang-wook	
2007	Sexi Mong	Yoon Jae-yi	
2007	Eight Days, Assassination Attempts against King Jeongjo	Kim Han-ju	
2010	The King of Legend	Buyeo San	
2011	You're So Pretty	Park Chi-young	
2012	Operation Proposal	Time conductor Kang Jin-woo	
2012	KBS Drama Special "Rememory"	Detective Kang Ji-hoon	
2012	The Innocent Man	Ahn Min-young	
2013	Pure Love	Jung Woo-sung	
2013	Drama Festival "Boy Meets Girl"	Hyung-gu	
2014	Secret Door	Kang Pil-jae	
2014	Bad Guys	Prosecutor Oh Jae-won	
2015	Angry Mom	Do Jung-woo	
2015	This is My Love	Choi Jae-ho	
2015	Hidden Identity	Min Tae-in	
2015	Reply 1988	Cardiac surgeon	Special appearance (Eps. 8)
2016	One More Happy Ending	Kim Gun-hak	
2016	Fantastic	Dr. Hong Joon-ki	
2017	The Guardians	Kim Eun-jung	
2018	Hold Me Tight	Seok-jun	
2018	Live	Sang-soo's older brother	Special appearance
2019	Persona	IU's father	Special appearance
2019	Secret Boutique	Wi Jung-hyuk	
2019	Kingdom	Lee Gang-yun	
2020	My Unfamiliar Family	Yoon Tae-hyung	
2021	Navillera	Ki Seung-joo	
2022	Never Give Up	Hwang Eun-ho	
2023	Delightfully Deceitful	Jay / Chairman	
2023	My Dearest	Choe Myeong-gil	
2023	My Demon	Noh Seok-min	
2025	Friendly Rivalry	Yoo Tae-joon	

=== Web series ===
Year	Title	Role	Notes	Ref.
2022	Alice, the Ultimate Weapon	Spicy		
2022–2023	Shadow Detective	Woo Hyeon-seok	Season 1–2	
2023	Queenmaker	Ma Jung-seok		
2024	Chicken Nugget			

=== Hosting ===
Year	Title	Role	Notes	Ref.
2021	19th Gwanghwamun International Short Film Festival	Host for the Opening and closing ceremonies	with Kwon Yul	

== Theater ==
Year	Title	Role
2004	상사주	
2005	Dancing at Lughnasa	
	Proposal	
	Pelléas and Mélisande	

== Awards and nominations ==
Name of the award ceremony, year presented, category, nominee of the award, and the result of the nomination
Award ceremony	Year	Category	Nominee / Work	Result	Ref.
Asiana International Short Film Festival	2009	Face in Shorts Award	Q & A	Won	
MBC Drama Awards	2018	Top Excellence Award, Actor in a Wednesday-Thursday Miniseries	Hold Me Tight	Nominated	
SBS Drama Awards	2023	Excellence Award, Actor in a Miniseries Romance/Comedy Drama	My Demon	Nominated	
Wildflower Film Awards	2022	Best Actor	A Good Person	Won	
