= Celebrity (South Korean TV series) =

2023 South Korean television series

- Promotional poster
- Hangul: 셀러브리티
- RR: Selleobeuriti
- MR: Sellŏbŭrit'i
- Genre: Thriller
- Written by: Kim Yi-young
- Directed by: Kim Cheol-kyu
- Starring: Park Gyu-young; Kang Min-hyuk; Lee Chung-ah; Lee Dong-gun; Jun Hyo-seong
- Music by: Kim Jun-seok; Jung Se-rin
- Country of origin: South Korea
- Original language: Korean
- No. of episodes: 12

Production
- Executive producers: So Jae-hyun (CP); Shin Ye-jin
- Producers: Kim Young-kyu; Lee Ki-hyuk; Park Jin-hyung; Son Ki-won
- Running time: 37–53 minutes
- Production companies: Studio Dragon; Kim Jong-hak Production; How Pictures

Original release
- Network: Netflix
- Release: June 30, 2023

Celebrity (Korean: 셀러브리티) is a 2023 South Korean thriller television series written by Kim Yi-young and directed by Kim Cheol-kyu, and starring Park Gyu-young, Kang Min-hyuk, Lee Chung-ah, Lee Dong-gun and Jun Hyo-seong. The series depicts the desires and mysteries surrounding people who become social media influencers, living as so-called celebrities, and the people who envy them. It was released on Netflix, on June 30, 2023.

== Synopsis ==
Seo Ah-ri (Park Gyu-young) finds herself thrown into a life of fame, wealth, and desire as she explores the world of social media influencers. However, Ah-ri mentions how these influencers buy "followers", which tricks laypersons into believing that they are celebrities. As her reputation begins to tarnish during her rise and eventual fall, Ah-ri exposes the scandalous lives of the influencers, involving scams, harassment, drugs, and eventually death.

== Plot ==
Seo A-ri works as a door-to-door cosmetics salesperson after her family’s wealth disappears following her father’s death and the collapse of their business. She unexpectedly reunites with former high school acquaintance Oh Min-hye, now a successful social media influencer, who invites her to an exclusive gathering of online celebrities known as the “Gabin Society.” Unaware that A-ri is no longer wealthy, Min-hye introduces her to the group, whose members publicly present themselves as close friends while privately competing for status and influence.

Although initially uncomfortable with their superficial behavior, A-ri attracts attention to her honesty, particularly from PR executive Ju Seung-hyeok, political heiress Yoon Si-hyeon, and cosmetics company CEO Han Jun-kyung. Encouraged to pursue social media fame, A-ri begins building her own online presence while openly challenging the culture of the Gabin Society.

An anonymous Instagram account known as “_bbbfamous” secretly provides A-ri with information about the private lives and vulnerabilities of Gabin Society members. Rather than publicly exposing these secrets, A-ri uses the information strategically to navigate the influencer hierarchy and gain popularity. Her rapid rise eventually rivals established celebrities, fueling jealousy and hostility within the group.

Tensions escalate during a nightclub gathering arranged by members of the Gabin Society in an attempt to reconcile with A-ri. Hoping to reduce the growing conflict, she attends but becomes unknowingly caught in a drug-fueled party. When a nightclub employee dies from an overdose, lawyer Jin Tae-jeon secretly covers up the incident. Although unaware of the drug use, A-ri becomes indirectly implicated and is pressured to remain silent.

As A-ri’s influence grows and she begins developing her own brand with Jun-kyung, Min-hye, and others begin searching for information to discredit her. The anonymous account “_bbbfamous,” which had initially aided A-ri’s rise, begins supplying Min-hye with information and fueling an online hate campaign against her. Public backlash intensifies as the nightclub incident becomes known, while Jin Tae-jeon takes extreme measures to suppress the scandal.

Following escalating harassment, business failure, and the suicide of a close associate, A-ri appears to take her own life. In reality, she goes into hiding to investigate the identity of “_bbbfamous,” whom she suspects of manipulating events within the influencer world.

Months later, a mysterious livestream using A-ri’s likeness begins exposing corruption and hidden crimes among influencers, causing panic within the Gabin Society. The broadcast is eventually traced to A-ri’s friend Yoon Jeong-sun and an IT specialist using deepfake technology in hopes of drawing A-ri out. It is then revealed that Lee Eun-chae, a massage therapist who had access to Gabin Society members, operated the “_bbbfamous” account. Obsessed with the influencer world yet resentful of its arrogance, she secretly recorded conversations and gathered secrets, first helping A-ri rise before later orchestrating her downfall.

In the aftermath, the corruption surrounding the Gabin Society is exposed, and several powerful figures face public disgrace. Although encouraged to return to social media fame, A-ri ultimately declines, concluding that the world of online celebrity is unpredictable and toxic.

== Cast ==
=== Main ===
- Park Gyu-young as Seo Ah-ri, a door-to-door cosmetics salesperson after her father's death and the bankruptcy of the family business. She later enters the world of social media influencers and becomes involved with the Gabin Society.
- Kang Min-hyuk as Han Jun-kyung: A wealthy chaebol heir who becomes interested in Ah-ri and later develops a romantic relationship with her.
- Lee Chung-ah as Yoon Si-hyeon: A prominent member of the Gabin Society who avoids social media. She is Tae-jeon's wife and Jun-kyung's former fiancée.
- Lee Dong-gun as Jin Tae-jeon: Si-hyeon's husband and the CEO of the law firm Taegang, who works to protect his power and conceal his secrets.
- Jun Hyo-seong as Oh Min-hye: Ah-ri's former classmate and a social media influencer who is a member of Gabin Society.

=== Supporting ===
==== Gabin Society ====
- Han Jae-in as Jin Chae-hee: A wealthy influencer who relies on her family status to maintain her social media presence and secure brand collaborations. She is Tae-jeon's younger sister.
- Han Eu-ddeum as Angela: An influencer who maintains a luxurious public image despite financial limitations within her marriage.
- Kim Si-hyun as Ji-na: An influencer who promotes counterfeit luxury goods while presenting them as authentic on social media.
- Jung Yoo-min as Han Yu-rang: A member of the Gabin Society and a close associate of Min-hye. She is married to plastic surgeon Kim Min-chan.

==== Recurring ====
- Kim Noh-jin as Lee Eun-chae / Lee Seon-young: A masseuse working at a spa frequented by members of the Gabin Society. She is later revealed to be the anonymous account "_bbbfamous", which secretly gathers and spreads information about influencers, including Ah-ri.
- Park Ye-ni as Yoon Jeong-sun, a close friend of Seo Ah-ri
- Jeong Yu-mi as Hwang Yu-ri, a famous influencer and owner of Bestaroom, a shop that commands major influence across the Dongdaemun
- Han Eun-jung as Wang Ro-la, a former member of Gabin Society and a disgraced influencer
- Jung Wook-jin as Kwon Myeong-ho, Min-hye’s submissive husband.
- Nam Gi-ae as Lee Hyeon-ok, a mother of Seo Ah-ri and Seo Du-Seong
- Lee Jung-jun as Seo Du-seong, an IT specialist and younger brother of Seo Ah-ri
- Seo Hyun-woo as Detective Jang Hyun-soo
- Um Hyo-sup as Park Gyeong-bae, a former employee of Ah-ri's father and an associate of the Seo family.
- Choi Young-woo as Hwang Yong-tae, an owner of Aragon Club and local gangster works for Jin

=== Special appearances ===
- Jin So-yeon as Biinimom, a disgraced influencer (Ep. 1-2, 9)
- Lee Jun-ho as cleaning crew staff (Ep. 12)
- Lee Sang-yoon as celebrity (Ep. 2, 7)
- David Lee McInnis as celebrity (Ep. 7)
- Song Kyung-ah as a celebrity (Ep. 7)
- Seol In-ah as Song Yeon-woo, an actress connected to the Gabin Society.(Ep. 4)
- Jung Yoo-jin as Choi Bom, a famous runway model (Ep. 7–8)
- Kim Hyun-jung as Kim Hyeon-jeong (Ep. 11)
- Yuqi as Zhang Wei, a very famous Chinese influencer (Ep. 8–9)
- Cha Hyun-seung and Oh Jin-taek as a celebrity (Ep. 1)
- Hook! as a celebrity (Ep. 1, 3, 8)
- Ssinnim, Calary Girl, Kiudesign, Risa Bae, Director Pi as a celebrity (Ep. 1, 3, 4)
- Hong Ji-yoon as celebrity (Ep. 1, 7)
- Jeong Hyuk as celebrity (Ep. 7)
- Yoon Bo-ra as celebrity (Ep. 7)
- Lee Hye-sung as celebrity (Ep. 1)
- Nana as celebrity / Drag Queen (Ep. 1)
- Park Jae-min
- Nana Youngrong Kim
- Glen Check
- Teacher Ki Woo
- Kim Jang-mi
- Ginjo
- Suna Gul
- Choi Kwang-rok
- Lee Hye-ju
- Oh Young-joo
- Yoon Hae-bin
- ASMR Suna
- Ahn Ye-won
- Cho Min-ho
- Cho Jong-tae

== Production ==
=== Casting ===
In May 2022, Celebrity confirmed production with ensemble casting of Park Gyu-young, Kang Min-hyuk, Lee Chung-ah, Lee Dong-gun and Jun Hyo-seong.

=== Filming ===
Filming began in December 2021.

== Reception ==
=== Critical response ===
On the review aggregator website Rotten Tomatoes, 80% of 5 critics' reviews are positive, with an average rating of 6.4/10.

=== Accolades ===
Name of the award ceremony, year presented, category, nominee of the award, and the result of the nomination
Award ceremony	Year	Category	Nominee / Work	Result	Ref.
Korea Drama Awards	2023	Hot Star Award	Jung Yoo-min	Won	
