= Righteous Love (TV series) =

- Promotional poster
- Also known as: Sensible Love
- Genre: Romance, Drama, Comedy
- Written by: Kim Do-woo
- Directed by: Han Ji-seung
- Starring: Uhm Tae-woong; Lee Si-young; Lee Soo-hyuk
- Country of origin: South Korea
- Original language: Korean
- No. of episodes: 20

Production
- Executive producer: Kim Young-kyu
- Producers: Kim Kwang-il; Kim Ryun-hee
- Production company: KPAX

Original release
- Network: tvN
- Release: December 1, 2014 – February 3, 2015

Righteous Love (Korean: 일리있는 사랑; RR: Illiinneun sarang; lit. 'Valid Love') is a 2014 South Korean television series starring Uhm Tae-woong, Lee Si-young and Lee Soo-hyuk. It aired on tvN at 23:00 (KST) from December 1, 2014 to February 3, 2015 for 20 episodes.

== Synopsis ==
Jang Hee-tae (Uhm Tae-woong) and Kim Il-ri (Lee Si-young) first met when she was 18, fourteen years before the main events of the series. He had gone to the hospital for a circumcision, while she mistakenly ended up in the urology department while looking for orthopedics. She then crashed into him as they were leaving the facility. He later briefly became her substitute biology teacher while her regular teacher was on maternity leave, as he waited to go to the US to study. Il-ri developed a crush on him. For his part, he helped her get along better with her classmates and encouraged her to study and attend art school. Later, however, she was seriously injured when a car sped toward them and crashed into her, while she managed to push him out of the way. After delaying his trip multiple times, he was persuaded by Il-ri's mother to go to the US, as Il-ri just needed time to recuperate, and him losing his chance to study in the States and ruining his future would not help anyone. After spending a year recovering in the hospital, Il-ri began working as a house painter. Seven years later, they met again by chance, fell in love and got married. In the present day, Hee-tae works as a marine researcher on a fishing boat, while Il-ri becomes attracted to a carpenter, Kim Joon (Lee Soo-hyuk), who hires her to paint his studio.

== Cast ==
- Uhm Tae-woong as Jang Hee-tae - A marine biologist and the husband of Kim Il-ri. They first met at a hospital, where he was undergoing circumcision. He later briefly became a substitute biology teacher at her school while waiting to leave for the US to study. He first suspected that his wife was having an affair after receiving a message from an anonymous number. After confirming his suspicions, despite Il-ri's objections, he filed for divorce, and they began living separately. Realizing that he still loved her, he later tried to get back together with Il-ri, but she refused because she was hurt by his initial decision to divorce her and by his doubts about whether her feelings for him were rooted in romantic love or mere dependence, and she also did not believe he could truly forgive her. Various problems then arose, including family-related issues, leading the two to spend more time together and ultimately paving the way for their reconciliation.
- Lee Si-young as Kim Il-ri - A house painter and the wife of Jang Hee-tae, Il-ri first met him at a hospital. Later he briefly became her substitute biology teacher before leaving to study in the US. The two reunited seven years later, fell in love and got married. Shortly after their honeymoon, Hee-tae’s sister, Hee-soo, collapsed and became paralyzed. Il-ri secretly decided that she and Hee-tae would not have children, to focus on Hee-soo, while letting her husband believe they were unable to conceive due to a medical condition, even attending a hospital consultation. When, fearing that keeping Hee-soo at home could result in an accident, and also concerned that it would overwhelm Il-ri, Hee-tae suggested placing her in a nursing home his wife had previously vetted, Il-ri insisted they treat Hee-soo as their surrogate child until they had a baby, while hiding her decision not to conceive. Hee-tae agreed, asking her to tell him if she had a hard time. Il-ri was hired by a carpenter named Kim Joon to paint his studio. The two became attracted to each other and began an affair. Their relationship was eventually discovered by Hee-tae, who filed for divorce. After various hardships, Il-ri ultimately chose to leave Kim Joon and reconcile with Hee-tae.
- Lee Soo-hyuk as Kim Joon - Found abandoned on his grandfather's doorstep, Kim Joon grew up following in his grandfather's footsteps and became a carpenter. He hired someone to paint his new studio but did not expect the painter to be a young woman. Initially cold and grouchy toward Il-ri and her constant chatter, he became attracted to her and pursued her despite knowing that she was married.
- Choi Yeo-jin as Jang Hee-soo - Hee-tae's sister, who was once a ballerina. After collapsing and becoming paralyzed, she could only observe what was happening around her family. She often imagined having conversations with her family members in her head.
- Lee Young-lan as Mrs. Go
- Im Ha-ryong as Jang Min-ho
- Park Jeong-min as Jang Ki-tae
- Seo Jeong-yeon as Kim Boon-ja
- Han Eu-ddeum as Kim Yi-ri
- Ryu Hye-rin as Jung Soo-young
- Han Do-woo as Choi Duk-bae
- Han Soo-yeon as Yoo Sun-joo
- Kim Ki-moo as Hwang Jung-goo
- Han Seung-yoon as Lee Suk
- Kim Sung-ki as Mart Grandpa
- Seo Tae-hwa as Professor Park
- Hong Tae-ui as Park Min-ki
- Jin Hee-kyung as Kim Joon's mother
- Park Jin-seo
- Hwang Gun
- Gong Hyung-jin (cameo)
- Lee Si-eon (cameo)
- Sung Ji-ru (cameo)

== International broadcast ==
- It aired in Vietnam on VTV3 from August 25, 2016.
- It aired in Malaysia on TV9 (Malaysia) started December 2017.
