= Gentleman (2022 film) =

2022 South Korean crime action film

- Theatrical release poster
- Hangul: 젠틀맨
- RR: Jenteulmaen
- MR: Chent'ŭlmaen
- Directed by: Kim Kyung-won
- Screenplay by: Kim Kyung-won
- Produced by: Yoo Hong-Jun; Kim Jae -yong
- Starring: Ju Ji-hoon; Park Sung-woong; Choi Sung-eun
- Cinematography: Byeon Bong-Sun; Kwun Young-il
- Edited by: Kim Woo-hyun; Kim Hyun-seo
- Music by: Dalpalan
- Production companies: Trickster Co., Ltd; H& Entertainment Co., Ltd; Content Wavve Inc.
- Distributed by: Plus M Entertainment
- Release date: December 28, 2022
- Running time: 123 minutes
- Country: South Korea
- Language: Korean
- Box office: US$1.6 million

Gentleman (Korean: 젠틀맨) is a 2022 South Korean crime drama film written and directed by Kim Kyung-won. Starring Ju Ji-hoon, Park Sung-woong and Choi Sung-eun, the film depicts story of the president of a secret agency, who pretends to be a prosecutor to find a missing client and chases bad guys regardless of whether it is illegal or legal. It was released on December 28, 2022.

== Synopsis ==
Ji Hyun-soo (Ju Ji-hoon), the head of the National Crime Agency, handles 100% of the requested cases. At a pension where he went to look for a puppy with his client, he is attacked by a stranger and collapses, which leads to broken memories and his client disappeared. When he came to his senses, he suddenly finds himself as a suspect in a kidnapping case. Hyun-soo was mistaken for a prosecutor after a car rollover accident. While under arrest, he begins an investigation by disguising himself as a prosecutor to find his missing client. Kim Hwa-jin (Choi Sung-eun), a passionate prosecutor who was recently demoted, meets Hyun-soo posing as a prosecutor while investigating the kidnapping case. Hyun-soo learns that the incident he thought was a simple kidnapping is related to Kwon Do-hoon (Park Sung-woong), a law firm tycoon. Hyun-soo, who wants to clear his name, and Hwa-jin, who wants to catch Kwon Do-hoon, join hands to achieve their own goals. While digging into the ugly crimes of a large law firm conglomerate, they encounter a completely unexpected situation.

== Cast ==
- Ju Ji-hoon as Ji Hyeon-soo, the head of a criminal investigation agency who poses as a prosecutor to clear his name as a kidnapping suspect
- Park Sung-woong as Kwon Do-hoon, the CEO of a large law firm
- Choi Sung-eun as Kim Hwa-jin, an elite passionate prosecutor who cooperates with Ji Hyun-soo
- Ko Ju-hee as paramedic
- Lee Hyeon-gyun as Prosecutor Kang Seung-jun
- Kang Hong-seok as Cho Chang-mo
- Lee Dal as Jo Pil-yong
- Han Eu-ddeum as Law firm secretary
- Kwon Han-sol as Lee Joo-young
- Park Hye-eun as a genius hacker

== Production ==
Initially Han So-hee was offered the role along with Ju Ji-hoon in the film. Later Han So-hee left the cast for health reasons, Park Sung-woong and Choi Sung-eun joined the cast in August 2021.

The principal photography began on August 20, 2021 and was wrapped up on December 5. The Wavve original film was scheduled to be released in theaters and waves in 2022 after post-production.

== Release ==
The film released on December 28, 2022, on 751 screens. The film has been sold in 42 countries, including Japan, Taiwan, Hong Kong, Vietnam, Russia and Poland. It is releasing in Taiwan on January 6, in Vietnam on January 27, and in Mongolia on February 9.

=== Home media ===
The film was made available for streaming on IPTV (KT olleh TV, SK Btv, LG U+ TV), Home Choice, Google Play, satellite TV (Skylife), WAVVE, Naver Series ON from January 12, 2023.

== Reception ==
=== Box office ===
The film opened at 3rd place with 44,056 admissions at the Korean box office. As of January 31, 2023, it grossed $1,673,173 and have 219,807 admissions.

=== Critical response ===
Jung Jae-hyun of Cine21 reviewing the film praised the acting, writing, "The biggest strength of Gentleman, comes from the actors who gave 100% to save the charm of the characters." Jung was critical of twists in the story, writing, "The narrative of the film undergoes several plot twists, and these transitions do not mesh with the motivation of the characters." Concluding the review Jung also criticised the predictability of the endings of characters that they meet within the narrative." Jeong Ha-eun writing in Sports Seoul opined, "it is perfect for a killing time movie with moderate laughter and fun." Writing about acting Jeong said, "It feels like the character is wearing the actor's clothes." Concluding review she praised the director for playing the music to suit the scene, writing, "the exciting music that comes out in a tense situation creates a fresh atmosphere."
