= The Guardians (South Korean TV series) =

2017 South Korean television series

- Promotional poster
- Also known as: Catcher
- Hangul: 파수꾼
- RR: Pasukkun
- MR: P'asukkun
- Genre: Action; Thriller
- Created by: Lim Hwa-min
- Written by: Kim Soo-eun
- Directed by: Son Hyung-suk; Park Seung-woo
- Creative directors: Park Min-yun; Oh Da-young; Jang Rae-jin; Lee Jin-soo
- Starring: Lee Si-young; Kim Young-kwang; Kim Tae-hoon; Kim Seul-gi; Key
- Composer: Oh Suk-joon
- Country of origin: South Korea
- Original language: Korean
- No. of episodes: 32 (Note: In order to circumvent Korean laws that prevent commercial breaks in the middle of an episode, what would previously have been aired as single 70 minute episodes are now being repackaged as two 35 minute episodes, with two episodes being shown each night with a commercial break between the two.)

Production
- Executive producer: Im Hwa-min
- Producers: Park Jeong-wook; Park Kyung-soo; Sun Zhenkun (Note: Also spelled in Korean as Son Jin-gon.)
- Cinematography: Hong Sung-wook; Park Chang-soo
- Editors: Baek Hae-kyung; Jang Soo-nam
- Camera setup: Single camera
- Running time: 35 mins
- Production companies: Gallery 9 Nano Chem Tech (Note: The KOSDAQ-listed chemical company Nano Chem Tech is a co-producer through its Seoul-based subsidiary Happy Global ENT.)

Original release
- Network: MBC
- Release: May 22 – July 11, 2017

The Guardians (Korean: 파수꾼; RR: Pasukkun; lit. 'Lookout') is a South Korean television series starring Lee Si-young, Kim Young-kwang, Kim Tae-hoon, Kim Seul-gi and Key. The drama aired on MBC on Mondays and Tuesdays at 22:00 (KST) from May 22 to July 11, 2017.

== Synopsis ==
Guardians tells the story of a group of four people who team up to serve justice after losing their loved ones to criminals. The group consists of a detective, a prosecutor, a hacker, and an insomniac. They want to give these criminals the punishment that they deserve, and take matters into their own hands as the justice system in South Korea fails to capture the culprits.

== Cast ==
=== Main ===
- Lee Si-young as Jo Soo-ji

A former shooting player and current detective. She lost her daughter to a murderer and joins the group to punish the criminal who keeps evading the law.

- Kim Young-kwang as Jang Do-han

A passionate prosecutor who has a story of his own and becomes a monster for revenge.

- Kim Tae-hoon as Kim Eun-jung

Jang Do-han's fellow prosecutor.

- Kim Seul-gi as Seo Bo-mi

A woman who lost her entire family. She communicates with the world through security cameras, and she is a person who avoids social contact.

- Key as Gong Kyung-su

A mischievous skater and a genius hacker whose mother went missing.

=== Supporting ===
==== Seoul Central District Prosecutors' Office ====
- Choi Moo-sung as Yoon Seung-ro
- Kim Sang-ho as Oh Kwang-ho
- Park Joo-hyung as Park Joon-pyo

==== Criminal Investigation Team ====
- Kim Sun-young as Lee Sun-ae
- Jung Suk-yong as Nam Byung-jae
- Seo Jae-hyung as Ma Jin-ki

==== Nearby people ====
- Shin Dong-wook as Lee Gwan-woo
- Kim Jung-young as Soo Ji-mo
- Jeon Mi-seon as Park Yoon-hee
- Song Seon-mi as Chae Hye-sun
- Lomon as Yoon Si-wan
- Lee Ji-won as Jin Se-won

=== Others ===
- Ham Na-young as Jo Yoo-na
- Jang Jae-hee
- Seo Jae-hyung
- Choi Soo-hyung as Kim Woo-sung
- Kim Sa-hee as Seung-hee
- Bae Je-ki as Choi Myung-hee
- Yun Da-yeong as Kim Kyung-min
- Kim Dong-joo as Woo-sung' mother
- Ahn Jong-min
- Jung Da-won
- Nam Jung-hee
- Hong Keun-taek
- Suk Bo-bae
- Lee Min-uk
- Kim So-yeon
- Kim Mi-hye
- Jung Young-hoon
- Jung Hyun-suk as doctor
- Son Hyun-joon
- Woo Sang-jun as priest
- Hong Sung-deok as Jang Do-han's father
- Park Sung-gyun
- Jeon Jae-hyung
- Song Seung-yong
- Cho Dong-in as Han Dong-won
- Na Kyung-chul
- Hwang Tae-kwang
- Ha Min
- Shin Yoo-ri
- Lee Seok-ho
- Park Mi-na
- Bong Eun-seon
- Lim Song-ha
- Han Ye-seul
- Kim Young-jin
- Kim Yeon-joo
- Kim Seon-ah
- Jeon Ji-hak
- Kim Joo-hee
- Hyun Seok-joon
- Kang Hyun-uk
- Song Young-jae
- Shin Young-jin
- Nam Tae-boo
- Lim Jae-geun
- Choi Tae-hwan
- Lim Seung-dae as Seo Joo-wan, Seo Bo-mi's uncle (Ep. 12)
- Kim Ki-moo
- Kim Do-yoon as Kang Jin-goo
- Bae Ki-beom
- Song Kyung-hee
- Kim Jin-hee
- Kim Woo-hyun
- Hong Keun-taek
- Ahn Jong-min
- Seo Yoon-ah as Seo Bo-mi's sister
- Ri Min as drunk man in the car
- Park Won-ho
- Kim Sun-hye
- Cha Min-hyuk
- Park Bum-gyu

=== Special appearance ===
- Kim Byung-chun as Seo Bo-mi's father (Ep. 12)
- Jang Hee-soo as Seo Bo-mi's mother (Ep. 12)

== Production ==
The director Son Hyung-suk is known for his action, thriller drama Two Weeks and his historical drama Shine or Go Crazy.

The series is based on a script by rookie Kim Soo-eun which became the second placer in the 2016 MBC TV Drama Screenplay Competition in Miniseries category, behind Radiant Office which script was written by Jung Hoe-hyun.

"The Guardians" marks Shin Dong-wook's return after being diagnosed with CRPS, a cripplingly painful illness in 2010.

First script reading took place March 29 at MBC Broadcasting Station in Sangam, Seoul, South Korea.

== Original soundtracks ==
The Guardians OST Album

Soundtrack album by Various Artists
- Released: 2017
- Genre: Soundtrack
- Languages: Korean, English
- Label: Music&NEW

=== Part 1 ===
No.	Title	Lyrics	Music	Artist	Length
1.	"AMEN"	Damiano, Jeon Ji-yoon	Damiano, Kim Min-seok	Damiano f t. Jenyer	03:13

=== Part 2 ===
No.	Title	Lyrics	Music	Artists	Length
1.	"Got U" (Prod. RAINSTONE)	Ltak, Pop Culture	RAINSTONE, R.M. Tedder	Gill, Ltak feat. Pop Culture	04:16
2.	"Got U" (Prod. RAINSTONE)	Ltak	RAINSTONE, R.M. Tedder	Gill, Ltak	04:16
Total length:					08:32

=== Part 3 ===
No.	Title	Lyrics	Music	Artist	Length
1.	"Trickling" (주르륵)	Oh Seok-joon; Noh I-young	Noh I-young; Eunsol(1008)	Raina (Orange Caramel)	03:54
2.	"Trickling" (Inst.)		Noh I-young; Eunsol(1008)		03:54
Total length:					07:48

=== Part 4 ===
No.	Title	Lyrics	Music	Artists	Length
1.	"Taken"	Jeon Ji-yoon; DAVII	Jeon Ji-yoon; DAVII	Jenyer feat. DAVII	03:23
2.	"Taken" (Inst.)		Jeon Ji-yoon; DAVII		03:23
Total length:					06:46

=== Part 5 ===
No.	Title	Lyrics	Music	Artists	Length
1.	"Wanna Be With You"	Joo Ho; Suh Paul	Maven; Joo Ho; Koonikey	Takada Kenta, New Town Boyz	03:41
2.	"Wanna Be With You" (Inst.)		Maven; Joo Ho; Koonikey		03:41
Total length:					07:22

=== Part 6 ===
No.	Title	Lyrics	Music	Artist	Length
1.	"I Need A Light" (Prod. by Whee)	Whee	Whee	Han Gaeul	04:15
2.	"I Need A Light" (Prod. by Whee (Inst.))		Whee		04:15
Total length:					08:30

== Ratings ==
- In the table below, the blue numbers represent the lowest ratings and the red numbers represent the highest ratings.
- NR denotes that the drama did not rank in the top 20 daily programs on that date.

Ep.	Original broadcast date	Average audience share			
Ep.	Original broadcast date	TNmS Ratings		AGB Nielsen	
Ep.	Original broadcast date	Nationwide	Seoul	Nationwide	Seoul
1	May 22, 2017	4.9% (NR)	6.2% (NR)	6.0% (NR)	6.4% (18th)
2	May 22, 2017	5.8% (NR)	5.4% (NR)	5.7% (NR)	6.2% (NR)
3	May 23, 2017	5.4% (NR)	5.7% (NR)	4.6% (NR)	4.9% (NR)
4	May 23, 2017	4.8% (NR)	5.2% (NR)	4.8% (NR)	5.3% (NR)
5	May 29, 2017	5.8% (NR)	6.0% (NR)	5.6% (NR)	5.8% (NR)
6	May 29, 2017	5.7% (NR)	5.9% (NR)	6.6% (NR)	6.9% (NR)
7	May 30, 2017	7.0% (18th)	8.0% (12th)	6.2% (17th)	6.3% (17th)
8	May 30, 2017	7.6% (15th)	8.1% (11th)	7.3% (14th)	7.4% (11th)
9	June 5, 2017	6.3% (NR)	6.5% (20th)	6.8% (20th)	6.7% (NR)
10	June 5, 2017	6.8% (20th)	7.2% (16th)	7.5% (14th)	7.0% (16th)
11	June 6, 2017	7.2% (19th)	8.3% (12th)	7.1% (17th)	7.2% (19th)
12	June 6, 2017	7.2% (19th)	8.0% (14th)	7.7% (15th)	7.8% (13th)
13	June 12, 2017	7.2% (NR)	7.9% (13th)	6.1% (NR)	6.5% (NR)
14	June 12, 2017	8.7% (11th)	10.2% (4th)	7.2% (17th)	7.3% (13th)
15	June 13, 2017	7.2% (19th)	7.1% (16th)	7.2% (16th)	7.2% (14th)
16	June 13, 2017	8.6% (14th)	8.6% (9th)	8.1% (11th)	7.7% (9th)
17	June 19, 2017	6.3% (NR)	7.0% (18th)	7.2% (20th)	7.3% (15th)
18	June 19, 2017	6.9% (20th)	7.8% (13th)	7.7% (12th)	7.5% (11th)
19	June 20, 2017	6.8% (17th)	7.4% (14th)	8.5% (10th)	8.8% (8th)
20	June 20, 2017	6.9% (16th)	7.7% (13th)	8.6% (8th)	8.8% (8th)
21	June 26, 2017	6.5% (NR)	8.3% (8th)	7.4% (17th)	7.6% (13th)
22	June 26, 2017	7.2% (17th)	6.8% (19th)	8.2% (11th)	8.5% (8th)
23	June 27, 2017	7.9% (15th)	8.5% (10th)	8.0% (13th)	8.5% (8th)
24	June 27, 2017	8.9% (11th)	9.9% (4th)	8.6% (8th)	9.1% (7th)
25	July 3, 2017	7.2% (NR)	7.7% (18th)	6.6% (NR)	7.0% (NR)
26	July 3, 2017	7.8% (17th)	8.7% (13th)	7.3% (19th)	7.1% (NR)
27	July 4, 2017	9.0% (11th)	9.4% (8th)	8.3% (14th)	8.8% (10th)
28	July 4, 2017	9.1% (12th)	9.6% (7th)	9.7% (7th)	9.9% (6th)
29	July 10, 2017	8.7% (20th)	9.4% (10th)	7.3% (NR)	7.6% (NR)
30	July 10, 2017	9.4% (15th)	10.4% (6th)	8.5% (17th)	8.5% (10th)
31	July 11, 2017	9.3% (14th)	10.1% (8th)	9.3% (8th)	9.9% (7th)
32	July 11, 2017	9.7% (13th)	10.4% (6th)	10.2% (6th)	10.6% (6th)
Average		7.3%	7.9%	7.4%	7.6%

== Awards and nominations ==
Year	Award	Category	Recipient	Result	Ref.
2017	30th Grimae Awards	Best New Actor	Key	Won	
2017	36th MBC Drama Awards	Top Excellence Award, Actor in a Monday-Tuesday Drama	Kim Young-kwang	Nominated	
2017	36th MBC Drama Awards	Top Excellence Award, Actress in a Monday-Tuesday Drama	Lee Si-young	Nominated	
2017	36th MBC Drama Awards	Excellence Award, Actress in a Monday-Tuesday Drama	Kim Seul-gi	Nominated	
2017	36th MBC Drama Awards	Golden Acting Award, Actor in a Monday-Tuesday Drama	Shin Dong-wook	Nominated	
2017	36th MBC Drama Awards	Golden Acting Award, Actress in a Monday-Tuesday Drama	Kim Sun-young	Nominated	
2017	36th MBC Drama Awards	Best New Actor	Key	Nominated	
2017	36th MBC Drama Awards	Best Young Actor/Actress	Lomon	Nominated	
2017	36th MBC Drama Awards	Best Character Award, Fighting Spirit Acting	Lee Si-young	Nominated	
