= Hot Young Bloods =

2014 film

- Theatrical poster
- Hangul: 피끓는 청춘
- Lit.: Blood Boiling Youth
- RR: Pikkeulleun cheongchun
- MR: P'ikkŭllŭn ch'ŏngch'un
- Directed by: Lee Yeon-woo
- Written by: Lee Yeon-woo
- Produced by: Kim Jin-seop
- Starring: Park Bo-young; Lee Jong-suk; Lee Se-young; Kim Young-kwang
- Cinematography: Kim Dong-cheon
- Edited by: Steve M. Choe
- Music by: Shim Hyeon-jeong
- Distributed by: Lotte Entertainment
- Release date: 23 January 2014
- Running time: 121 minutes
- Country: South Korea
- Language: Korean
- Box office: US$10.6 million

Hot Young Bloods (Korean: 피끓는 청춘) is a 2014 South Korean teen romantic comedy film that depicts the loves, rivalries, and friendships between four high school students in Hongseong County, South Chungcheong Province in the 1980s. Hot Young Bloods was inspired by the short film That's What I Told Her (2013, Daniels Calvin).

== Plot ==
Set in a rural town in 1982, Young-sook (Park Bo-young) is the feared leader of a female gang at Hongseong Agricultural High School. Although she is known for her toughness and foul mouth, she secretly has a crush on Joong-gil (Lee Jong-suk), the biggest playboy in school. Joong-gil is a legendary Casanova whose single glance has the ability to make girls' hearts melt, and he's attempted to woo all the girls at school, except for Young-sook. That's because Gwang-sik (Kim Young-kwang), the leader of a rival school's male gang, views Young-sook as his girl.

Then a new female transfer student, So-hee (Lee Se-young) from Seoul arrives at their high school. So-hee is beautiful, innocent-looking and different from the other girls, and Joong-gil falls for her instantly. The jealous Young-sook picks a fight with So-hee to prevent her new rival from encroaching on her secret crush. Trouble brews as Gwang-sik, suspicious of the ties between Young-sook and Joong-gil, also harasses So-hee to instigate Joong-gil.

== Cast ==
- Park Bo-young as Young-sook
- Lee Jong-suk as Joong-gil
- Lee Se-young as So-hee
- Kim Young-kwang as Gwang-sik
- Ra Mi-ran as Na-young, a teacher
- Kim Hee-won as Jong-pal, a teacher
- Park Jung-min as Hwang-kyu
- Jin So-yeon as Hwa-seon
- Shin Hyun-tak as Man-chul
- Jeon Soo-jin as Song Yeon-hwa, Young-sook's henchwoman
- Kwon Hae-hyo as Dae-pan, Joong-gil's father
- Kim Ji-eun as Young-sook's classmate
- Lee Chae-eun as young Young-sook
- Han Da-sol as Bicyclist

== Historical context ==
The film is set in a southern agricultural area of Hongseong County in the early 1980s. In 1982, the Korean Ministry of Education eliminated uniforms for middle- and high-schoolers. This created a sense of freedom and individualism for the young people of the time. Uniforms were reinstated in 1986.

== Production ==
Filming began on 1 August 2013 in Sunchang, North Jeolla Province. After three months of filming in Sunchang, the seaside town of Hongseong, and the metropolitan city of Gwangju, the film wrapped on 4 November 2013.

The press conference was held on 30 December 2013, during which actress Park Bo-young revealed that she had a difficult time using the southern accent, which is a mix of Jeolla and Chungcheong dialects. Writer-director Lee Yeon-woo, who was a teenager in the 1980s, said he made the film because he thought it would "be fun to bring to life the experiences of his youth" spent in the countryside of Chungcheong. Lee, whose previous film Running Turtle (2009) had the same setting, said he liked the dialect and the Chungcheong-specific humor and sensibility, and that the retro rom-com was his way of expressing his sentiments about the digital era.

== Release ==
Hot Young Bloods opened in theaters on 23 January 2014. Two weeks after its release, it had recorded 1,570,609 admissions, which was attributed to the film's appeal to younger viewers given its premise and lead stars.

The film's distribution rights to Hong Kong were sold at the American Film Market, followed by Singapore and Malaysia.

== Awards and nominations ==
Year	Award	Category	Recipient	Result	Ref.
2014	16th Seoul International Youth Film Festival	Best Young Actress	Park Bo-young	Nominated	
2014	22nd Korean Culture and Entertainment Awards	Excellence Award, Actress in a Film	Park Bo-young	Won	
2014	22nd Korean Culture and Entertainment Awards	Best New Actor in a Film	Kim Young-kwang	Won	
