= The Ordinary Jackpot =

2026 South Korean television series

- Promotional poster
- Hangul: 로또 1등도 출근합니다
- Lit.: Even a Lotto 1st-Place Winner Goes to Work
- RR: Rotto 1deungdo chulgeunhamnida
- MR: Rotto 1tŭngdo ch'ulgŭnhamnida
- Genre: Workplace; Drama
- Based on: The Ordinary Jackpot by Seo In-ha
- Written by: Yoon Young-bin
- Directed by: Yoon Young-bin
- Starring: Lee Joon-hyuk; Seo Hyun-woo; Oh Dae-hwan
- Music by: Dalpalan
- Country of origin: South Korea
- Original language: Korean
- No. of episodes: 10

Production
- Executive producers: Min Kyung-wook; Moon Seok-hwan
- Producer: Lee Chang-woo
- Cinematography: Han Seung-hoon; Park Min-hyun
- Editor: Han Mi-yeon
- Running time: 44–53 minutes
- Production companies: CJ ENM Studios; Bon Factory

Original release
- Network: TVING
- Release: September 10 – October 8, 2026
- Network: tvN
- Release: September 14 – October 13, 2026

The Ordinary Jackpot (Korean: 로또 1등도 출근합니다) is a 2026 South Korean workplace drama television series written and directed by Yoon Young-bin, and starring Lee Joon-hyuk, Seo Hyun-woo, and Oh Dae-hwan. Based on the web novel of the same name by Seo In-ha, the series follows a salaryman who continues his corporate life with a newfound sense of psychological security and boldness after winning the lottery jackpot. It premiered on TVING on September 10, 2026, at 18:00 (KST) and aired on tvN from September 14, to October 13, every Monday and Tuesday at 21:00 (KST). It is also available for streaming on HBO Max and Rakuten Viki.

The series received generally favorable reviews from critics and audiences for its hyper-realistic portrayal of modern office life, avoidance of conventional K-drama clichés, and sharp depiction of corporate survival. Driven by strong word-of-mouth and praise for its core performances, the series achieved steady commercial success, topping TVING's subscription contribution rankings for consecutive weeks and concluding its run on tvN with a personal-best nationwide viewership rating of 6.2%.

== Synopsis ==
Gong Eun-tae is a diligent salesperson at Hongsung International whose life is transformed when he wins a first-place lottery jackpot. However, upon discovering the prize is ₩1.3 billion—a significant sum that nonetheless falls short of the amount needed for lifelong retirement in the current economic climate—he makes the unconventional choice to remain employed. Treating the winnings as "mental insurance", Eun-tae continues his daily office routine, but with a newfound, fearless attitude that disrupts the existing corporate hierarchy and shifts his relationships with his ambitious superiors and envious colleagues.

== Cast and characters ==
=== Main ===
- Lee Joon-hyuk as Gong Eun-tae
  - Kim Do-kyung as young Eun-tae

Team 5 Leader of Sales Division 1 at Hongsung International who won a ₩1.3 billion lottery jackpot.

- Seo Hyun-woo as Yang Jun-ho

Team 5 Assistant Manager of Sales Division 1 at Hongsung International.

- Oh Dae-hwan as Jeong Seon-hyuk

Team 4 Leader of Sales Division 1 at Hongsung International. He later resign to become the CEO of JSH Apparel then merge his company to CGM as the Korean Branch Manager.

=== Supporting ===
- Lee Hyun-kyun as Jang Kyung-cheol

Associate Director of Sales Division 1 at Hongsung International.

- Ok Ja-yeon as Jin Hae-ju

Assistant Manager of Legal Team at Hongsung International.

- Hong Jin-gi as Park Gi-tae

Team 5 member of Sales Division 1 at Hongsung International.

- Ha Yully as Lee Ji-hye

A contract worker and team 5 youngest member of Sales Division 1 at Hongsung International.

- Baek Ye-in as Jang Hyang-eun

Team 5 assistant manager of Sales Division 1 at Hongsung International who returned from China branch.

- Kim Jun-bae as Mr. Oh

Owner of Daily Routine Cafe.

- Hong Seo-jun as Koo In-mock

Vice President of Hongsung International.

- Park Bo-kyung as Park Hyeon-suk

Sales Department 1 manager

- Yoo Gun-woo as Son Jun-ho

Team 2 Leader of Sales Division 1 at Hongsung International.

- Lee A-joo as Joo Sun-ah

Team 3 Leader of Sales Division 1 at Hongsung International. She later resigned to work for CGM.

- Moon Jong-il as Kim Hyun-sik

Team 1 Leader of Sales Division 1 at Hongsung International.

- Kim Hee-su as Oh Jung-hwan

Team 4 Assistant Manager of Sales Division 1 at Hongsung International.

- Yuhyun as Choi Joo-hee

Team 2 Assistant Manager of Sales Division 1 at Hongsung International.

- Fausto Zizioli as Luca Sponza

CEO of Mantua who is a business partner from Italy.

=== Others ===
- Kim Hyuk-jong as the team leader of Legal Department at Hongsung International
- Yu Soon-woong as Eun-tae's father
- Jang Ae-hwa as Eun-tae's mother
- Park Seo-woo as Gong Eun-seok

Eun-tae's older brother who works as a guard.

- Park Sun-young as Kim Eun-ji, the lotto manager
- Ha Soo-ho as Kim Hyeong-chan

Asian Branch Director of Laknes.

- Park Jae-han as Ren Sakamoto

Asia Market Operations Manager of Laknes.

- Minyoung as Cha Min-ji

Manager at Laknes store.

- Park Jin-woo as Choi Byung-wook

Director of Sales Division 2 at Hongsung Internaltional.

- An A-young as Ms. Yoon

Associate Director of Sales Division 2 at Hongsung International

- Cha Young-nam as Lee Jong-hyun

Director of Etailro who is under investigation.

- Jung Seo-yeon as Eun-seok's wife
- Lee Da-eun as Gong A-yeong

Eun-tae's niece and Eun-seok's daughter.

- Oh Yong as Kim Soon-wook

Executive Director of Belmore.

- Choi Gwang-je as Mr. Kang

Team Leader of Paradi Mall.

- Go Yoon-bin as Mo Yu-jin

Assistant Manager of Sales Team at INA Mall.

- Go Hae-won as Park Yun-gyeong

Hyeon-suk's daughter.

=== Special appearances ===
- Hyun Bong-sik as Gil Sang-cheon

Owner of a convenience store.

- Cha Mi-kyung as the other lotto winner
- Uee as Yoo Ji-hyun

A brand model who face a contract termination due to her divorce.

- Yoon Se-ah as Martina

CMO of Mantua who is a Korean.

- Kim Ki-cheon as Mr. Hong

CEO of Hongsung International.

== Episodes ==
No.	Title	Directed by	Written by	Original release date
1	"Good Things Come to Those Who Wait"; Transliteration: "Chamneun ja-ege bog-i innani" (Korean: 참는 자에게 복이 있나니)	Yoon Young-bin	Yoon Young-bin	September 10, 2026
2	"One in 8,145,060"; Transliteration: "Pallilmansacheonobaekyuksibbunui il" (Korean: 8,145,060분의 1)	Yoon Young-bin	Yoon Young-bin	September 10, 2026
3	"What I Believe"; Transliteration: "Naega midneun geot" (Korean: 내가 믿는 것)	Yoon Young-bin	Yoon Young-bin	September 17, 2026
4	"Mutual Cause, Mutual Effect"; Transliteration: "Seoroui wonin, seoroui gyeolgwa" (Korean: 서로의 원인, 서로의 결과)	Yoon Young-bin	Yoon Young-bin	September 17, 2026
5	"When No One Can Speak the Truth"; Transliteration: "Amudo jinsimeul malhaji mothal ttae" (Korean: 아무도 진심을 말하지 못할 때)	Yoon Young-bin	Yoon Young-bin	September 24, 2026
6	"Problem Recognizes Problem"; Transliteration: "Munjereul insikhaneun munje" (Korean: 문제를 인식하는 문제)	Yoon Young-bin	Yoon Young-bin	September 24, 2026
7	"Nothing has Changed"; Transliteration: "Amugeotdo bakkwin ge eopda" (Korean: 아무것도 바뀐 게 없다)	Yoon Young-bin	Yoon Young-bin	October 1, 2026
8	"A World Built on Hypocrisy"; Transliteration: "Wiseoni mandeuneun sesang" (Korean: 위선이 만드는 세상)	Yoon Young-bin	Yoon Young-bin	October 1, 2026
9	"Interpreting the Past"; Transliteration: "Gwageoui haeseok" (Korean: 과거의 해석)	Yoon Young-bin	Yoon Young-bin	October 8, 2026
10	"The Ordinary Jackpot"; Transliteration: "Rotto ildeungdo gyesok chulgeunhamnida" (Korean: 로또 1등도 계속 출근합니다)	Yoon Young-bin	Yoon Young-bin	October 8, 2026

== Production ==
=== Development ===
The project is produced by CJ ENM Studios and Bon Factory. Directed and written by Yoon Young-bin, who made his directorial debut with the 2021 film Tomb of the River. It is based on the web novel of the same name by Seo In-ha.

=== Casting ===
In January 2025, Lee Joon-hyuk had been cast as the lead in the series. Seo Hyun-woo and Ok Ja-yeon were also cast by June 2025. This marks the reunion of Lee and Seo following their work in The Lies Within (2019). On the same month, Lee, Seo, and Oh Dae-hwan confirmed to appear.

== Release ==
The Ordinary Jackpot premiered on TVING on September 10, 2026, at 18:00 (KST). Following its streaming release, it aired on tvN as a Monday–Tuesday drama on September 14, 2026, at 21:00 (KST). It is also available for streaming on HBO Max and Rakuten Viki in selected territories.

== Reception ==
=== Critical response ===
The Ordinary Jackpot received generally favorable reviews from critics and audiences, particularly for its realistic portrayal of modern office life and its departure from typical K-drama clichés. Writing for the South China Morning Post, Pierce Conran described the series as a departure from conventional workplace romantic comedies, focusing instead on the office dynamics of Seoul-based salaried workers. Conran noted that the series presents a grounded depiction of workplace challenges, including microaggressions and communication barriers, and compared its tone to slice-of-life office dramas such as The Dream Life of Mr. Kim. Additionally, the review highlighted Lee Joon-hyuk's portrayal of timid sales team leader Gong Eun-tae, observing how the character's internal changes—prompted by a sudden lottery win—drive a narrative centered on personal empowerment over material wealth.

Korean reviews further lauded the series for capturing the post-traumatic stress disorder (PTSD) of corporate workers and middle management, steering clear of forced melodrama or romance. Critics from outlets like iMBC and Herald Muse observed that unlike traditional fantasies, the ₩1.3 billion lottery prize is not enough to retire forever in Seoul's harsh economy; instead, it serves as a psychological shield and a "backup cushion" that allows a burnt-out employee to push back against workplace stress and regain their self-worth. Reviewers also praised the series for avoiding clear-cut villains, focusing instead on realistic interpersonal friction driven by miscommunication, differing perspectives, and survival instincts within corporate structures.

The performances of the core cast—particularly Lee Joon-hyuk's subdued, deadpan delivery, alongside the layered portrayals by Seo Hyun-woo and Oh Dae-hwan—were widely commended for anchoring the show's subtle rhythm and adding authentic depth to the evolving relationships within Sales Department.

=== Viewership ===
According to Nielsen Korea, The Ordinary Jackpot premiered on tvN with a nationwide viewership rating of 3.9%. On TVING, paid subscription contributions increased approximately threefold on the second day following its release compared to the first, ranking second among major content on the platform in cumulative paid subscription additions.

As the series progressed, its popularity grew steadily, culminating in its conclusion. The final episode, broadcast on tvN, recorded an average of 6.2% and a peak of 7.2% nationwide based on Nielsen Korea's paid platforms, while reaching an average of 6.5% and a peak of 7.7% in the Seoul metropolitan area to set a new personal best for the program. It ranked first in its time slot across cable and general programming channels, and secured the top spot across all channels—including terrestrial networks—for the male and female 20 to 49 demographic both nationwide and in the metropolitan area.

The drama maintained strong momentum on OTT platforms as well, ranking first in TVING's weekend subscription contribution category for four consecutive weeks and holding the lead in weekly subscription contributions.

The Ordinary Jackpot : South Korea viewers per episode (thousands)

Season	Episode number										Average
Season	1	2	3	4	5	6	7	8	9	10	Average
1	883	1278	1081	1155	854	1144	710	1427	1146	1416	1109

Source: Audience measurement performed nationwide by Nielsen Korea.

Average TV viewership ratings
Ep.	Original broadcast date	Average audience share (Nielsen Korea)	
Ep.	Original broadcast date	Nationwide	Seoul
1	September 14, 2026	3.945% (2nd)	3.652% (2nd)
2	September 15, 2026	5.199% (1st)	4.822% (1st)
3	September 21, 2026	4.618% (1st)	4.522% (1st)
4	September 22, 2026	4.815% (2nd)	4.067% (2nd)
5	September 28, 2026	3.545% (3rd)	3.996% (2nd)
6	September 29, 2026	5.019% (2nd)	5.025% (1st)
7	October 5, 2026	3.075% (2nd)	2.681% (2nd)
8	October 5, 2026	5.941% (1st)	5.966% (1st)
9	October 12, 2026	5.057% (1st)	4.932% (1st)
10	October 13, 2026	6.208% (1st)	6.466% (1st)
Average		4.742%	4.613%
In the table above, the blue numbers represent the lowest ratings and the red numbers represent the highest ratings.; This drama aired on a cable channel/pay TV which normally has a relatively smaller audience compared to free-to-air TV/public broadcasters (KBS, SBS, MBC, and EBS).
