= Evilive (TV series) =

2023 South Korean television series

- Promotional poster
- Also known as: Evillive
- Hangul: 악인전기
- Lit.: Biography of a Villain
- RR: Aginjeongi
- MR: Aginjŏn'gi
- Genre: Crime; Noir
- Written by: Seo-hee; Lee Seung-hoon
- Directed by: Kim Jung-min; Kim Seong-min
- Starring: Shin Ha-kyun; Kim Young-kwang; Shin Jae-ha
- Music by: Koo Ja-wan
- Country of origin: South Korea
- Original language: Korean
- No. of episodes: 10

Production
- Executive producer: Park Min-seol
- Producers: Park Cheol-soo; Kim Mi-kyung; Yoon Chang-woo
- Running time: 60 minutes
- Production companies: KT Studio Genie; Film Monster

Original release
- Network: ENA
- Release: October 14 – November 13, 2023

Evilive (Korean: 악인전기) is a 2023 South Korean television series starring Shin Ha-kyun, Kim Young-kwang, and Shin Jae-ha. It is an original drama of Genie TV, and is available for streaming on its platform. It also aired on ENA from October 14 to November 13, 2023, every Sunday and Monday at 22:00 (KST) for 10 episodes.

== Synopsis ==
The series tells the story of a struggling lawyer who meets an absolute villain, and transforms into an elite villain himself.

== Cast ==
=== Main ===
- Shin Ha-kyun as Han Dong-soo

A livelihood lawyer who gets cases by recklessly visiting prisoners.

- Kim Young-kwang as Seo Do-young

A former baseball player and the second-in-command of a criminal organization.

- Shin Jae-ha as Han Beom-jae

Dong-soo's half-brother who works at a second-hand computer store.

=== Supporting ===
- Song Young-chang as Moon Sang-guk

CEO of Moon Law Firm.

- Joo Jin-mo as Kim Jae-yeol

A successful businessman and the CEO of a shipping company.

- Choi Byung-mo as Moon Hae-joon

A lawyer at Myeong Law Firm with arrogant personality.

- Choi Jung-in as Jung Hye-young

Dong-soo's wife.

- Jo Dal-hwan as Lee Seon-gyo

Dong-soo's friend who is the office manager of Moon Law Firm.

- Gil Hae-yeon as Lee Hye-ja

Dong-soo's mother.

=== Extended ===
- Bae Na-ra as Kwon Oh-jae

Do-young's loyal and honest subordinate.

- Hwang Ja-neung as Oh Soon-kyung

A homicide detective.

- Lee Kang-ji as Lee Seok

Beom-jae's friend who is a waiter.

- Jo Hyun-woo as Lee Su-ho

A homicide detective.

- Kwon Hyuk as Cheol-jin

A detective.

- Choi Yoo-ha as Park Je-yi

A woman who is full of ambition and obsession with money.

- Kwak Jin-seok as Song Yong-chan

Jae-yeol's bodyguard.

- Choi Min-cheol as Bae Jong-ha
- Moon Jin-seung as Heo Yang-ho
- Park Sang-won

== Release ==
The first two episodes of Evilive aired on ENA's Saturday–Sunday time slot. However, on October 18, 2023, the network announced the changes on its broadcasting schedule. Hence, the series aired every Sunday and Monday at 22:00 (KST), starting on the third episode.

== Viewership ==
Evilive : South Korea viewers per episode (thousands)

Season	Episode number									
Season	1	2	3	4	5	6	7	8	9	10
1	N/A	N/A	N/A	370	N/A	237	N/A	273	N/A	316

Source: Audience measurement performed nationwide by Nielsen Korea.

Average TV viewership ratings
Ep.	Original broadcast date	Average audience share (Nielsen Korea)	
Ep.	Original broadcast date	Nationwide	Seoul
1	October 14, 2023	0.284% (159th)	N/A
2	October 15, 2023	0.946% (24th)	1.226% (8th)
3	October 22, 2023	0.859% (35th)	N/A
4	October 23, 2023	1.661% (3rd)	1.884% (3rd)
5	October 29, 2023	0.950% (25th)	N/A
6	October 30, 2023	1.270% (7th)	1.311% (7th)
7	November 5, 2023	0.964% (33rd)	N/A
8	November 6, 2023	1.380% (4th)	1.406% (5th)
9	November 12, 2023	0.712% (40th)	N/A
10	November 13, 2023	1.410% (6th)	1.505% (6th)
Average		1.044%	— (Note: Due to multiple unpublished ratings, the exact average rating is unknown.)
In the table above, the blue numbers represent the lowest ratings and the red numbers represent the highest ratings.; N/A denotes ratings that were not published.; This series aired on a cable channel/pay TV which normally has a relatively smaller audience compared to free-to-air TV/public broadcasters (KBS, SBS, MBC and EBS).
