= Jin So-yeon =

South Korean actress (born 1991)

- Born: Jin So-yeon; 2 May 1991 (age 35); South Korea
- Other name: Jin So-yun
- Education: Chung-Ang University (Department of Theater)
- Occupations: Actress; model
- Years active: 2011–present
- Agent: Family Entertainment
- Known for: Hot Young Bloods; Touch Your Heart #Alive

Jin So-yeon is a South Korean actress and model. She is known for her roles in drama Touch Your Heart and in movies Hot Young Bloods and #Alive.

== Filmography ==
=== Television series ===
| Year | Title | Role | Ref. |
|---|---|---|---|
| 2017–19 | Office Watch | Kim Chung-jang | |
| 2018 | Miss Kim's Secret Life | Kim Ji-hyun | |
| 2018 | Sweet and Salty Office | So-yeon | |
| 2019 | Touch Your Heart | Yeo Reum's legal secretary | |
| 2019 | Miss Kim's Secret Life: Consumption | Kim Ji-hyun | |
| 2020 | Stranger 2 | No Joo-eun | |
| 2020 | Drama Stage: Blackout | Red Woman | |
| 2020 | No, Thank You | Yeon-soo | |
| 2021 | Nice Na Ik Soo | Park Tae-eun | |
| 2021 | Crime Puzzle | Han Yeon-joo | |
| 2021 | House for One Person | Aurora | |
| 2022 | No, Thank You 2 | Yeon-soo | |
| 2023 | The Heavenly Idol | Warrior | |
| 2023 | Call It Love | Baek Soo-hee | |
| 2023 | Celebrity | Beanie mom | |
| 2023 | Maestra: Strings of Truth | Kwon Su-jin | |
| 2024 | Single Man and Woman | Lee Ju-in | |
| 2025 | The Scandal of Chunhwa | Mrs. Park | |

=== Film ===
| Year | Title | Role | Ref. |
|---|---|---|---|
| 2011 | Short! Short! Short! | Student | |
| 2012 | Siren | Eun-hae | |
| 2014 | Hot Young Bloods | Hwa-seon | |
| 2020 | #Alive | Elena Kim | |
