= Kim Young-kwang (actor) =

South Korean actor (born 1987)

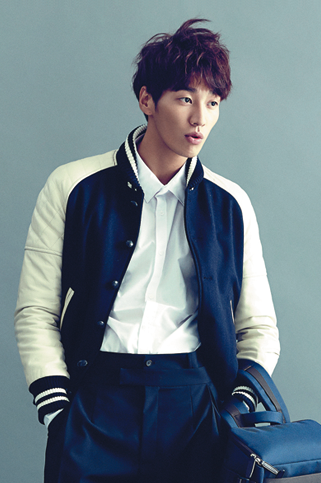
- Kim in 2014
- Born: January 11, 1987 (age 39); Incheon, South Korea
- Education: Hanyang University – Theater and Film
- Occupation: Actor
- Years active: 2006–present
- Agent: Wide-s company
- Height: 190 cm (6 ft 3 in)

Korean name
- Hangul: 김영광
- Hanja: 金英光
- RR: Gim Yeonggwang
- MR: Kim Yŏnggwang

Kim Young-kwang (Korean: 김영광; born January 11, 1987) is a South Korean actor and model. Kim began his career as a model and has modeled for designers such as Alexander McQueen, Vivienne Westwood and Etro. In 2008, he was the first Asian model to model at Dior Homme's show. As an actor, Kim has starred in the films Hot Young Bloods (2014) and On Your Wedding Day (2018), as well as the television dramas Pinocchio (2014), The Guardians (2017), The Secret Life of My Secretary (2019), Call It Love (2023), Trigger (2025), and the most recent series Take Charge of My Heart (2026).

== Early life ==
Born as Kim Young-kwang, Kim's father was a veteran of the Vietnam War and died when Kim was in elementary school.

== Career ==
Kim began acting in 2008, and later performed in the drama Good Doctor on KBS2. He also starred in the action comedy, Runway Cop (2012) and teen romance drama, Hot Young Bloods (2014). In 2014 he performed in dramas such as tvN's Plus Nine Boys and SBS's Pinocchio, for which he received an SBS Drama Award as "New Star" for his role as Seo Beom-jo. In 2015, he starred in the medical drama D-Day, and in the web drama Dr. Ian with Sandara Park. In 2016, he was cast as the lead in the web drama Gogh, The Starry Night with Kwon Yuri, and in the KBS2 romantic comedy series Sweet Stranger and Me with Soo Ae. In 2017, he starred in the MBC thriller drama The Guardians as a passionate prosecutor. In 2018, Kim starred in romance film On Your Wedding Day opposite Park Bo-young. His performance in the film earned him a Best New Actor award in film at the Baeksang Arts Awards. He then starred in fantasy comedy film The Soul-Mate together with Ma Dong-seok. Later that year, he was also cast in tvN's mystery drama Room No. 9. In 2019, Kim starred in the romance comedy drama The Secret Life of My Secretary, which premiered in May 2019.

In 2021, he starred in the spy action film Mission: Possible opposite Lee Sun-bin, which was released in February. Also in 2021, he starred alongside Choi Kang-hee in the fantasy romantic comedy Hello, Me!, which premiered in February 2021. In 2022, he starred in murder thriller netflix series Somebody. In 2023, he starred in Melo-drama titled Call It Love, alongside actress Lee Sung-Kyung. It aired on Disney+ from February 22 to April 12, 2023. Also that year, he starred in the Genie TV original drama Evilive.

In 2025, he had a cameo appearance in The Haunted Palace as an imoogi. Followed by Netflix original series Trigger, which he starred alongside actor Kim Nam-gil. He also starred in a crime thriller series Walking on Thin Ice, also known as Eunsoo's Good Day, alongside actress Lee Young Ae. He also starred in the film adventure comedy film The First Ride.

== Personal life ==
Kim maintains a close friendship with Lee Soo-hyuk, as well as other fellow models-turned-actors: Kim Woo-bin, Hong Jong-hyun and Sung Joon – with whom he has worked onscreen in White Christmas. They were given the nickname of "Model Avengers" by their fans. On December 12, 2013, Kim began his mandatory military service. However, he was only required to be enlisted for six months as a public service worker due to his father being a Vietnam War veteran, as well as an acknowledged person of national merit. Kim was discharged in June 2014.

== Filmography ==
=== Film ===
Year	Title	Role	Ref.
2012	Runway Cop	Han Seung-woo	
2014	Hot Young Bloods	Jo Gwang-sik	
2018	On Your Wedding Day	Hwang Woo-yeon	
2018	The Soul-Mate	Tae-jin	
2021	Mission: Possible	Woo Su-han	
2021	A Year-End Medley	Seung-hyo	
2025	The First Ride	Ko Do-jin	

=== Television series ===
Year	Title	Role	Notes	Ref.
2008	Worlds Within	Young-woong		
2009	Triple	Jae-wook		
2009	My Fair Lady	Jung Woo-sung		
2010	More Charming By the Day	Lee Young-kwang		
2011	White Christmas	Jo Young-jae		
2011	Bachelor's Vegetable Store	Lee Seul-woo		
2012	Love Rain	Han Tae-sung		
2012	Can We Get Married?	Gong Ki-joong		
2013	The Secret of Birth	Park Soo-chang		
2013	Good Doctor	Han Jin-wook		
2014	KARA: Secret Love	Yoon Joon-moon		
2014	Plus Nine Boys	Kang Jin-gu		
2014–2015	Pinocchio	Seo Beom-jo		
2015	D-Day	Lee Hae-sung		
2016	Sweet Stranger and Me	Go Nan-Gil		
2017	The Guardians	Jang Do-han		
2018	Room No. 9	Gi Yoo-jin / young real Gi San		
2019	The Secret Life of My Secretary	Do Min-ik		
2021	Hello, Me!	Han Yoo-hyun		
2022	Somebody	Sung Yun-oh		
2023	Call lt Love	Han Dong-jin		
2023	Evilive	Seo Do-young		
2025	The Haunted Palace	Gangcheori	Cameo	
2025	Trigger	Moon Baek		
2025	Walking On Thin Ice	Lee Kyung		
2026	Take Charge of My Heart	Baek Ho-rang		
TBA	Portraits of Delusion	K	Cameo	

=== Web series ===
Year	Title	Role	Ref.
2015	Dr. Ian	Mo Yi-an	
2016	Gogh, The Starry Night	Kang Tae-ho	

=== Television shows ===
Year	Title	Role	Notes	Ref.
2016	Law of the Jungle in New Caledonia	Main cast	Episodes 220–224	
2017	Boat Horn Clenched Fists	Main cast	from Episode 2–end	
2018	Law of the Jungle in Antarctica	Main cast	Episode 311–314	

=== Music video appearances ===
Year	Song Title	Artist	Ref.
2007	"My Heart Is Like That"	Lee Seung-hwan	
2007	"Shout for Love"	MC the Max	
2008	"It's You"	Shin Hye-sung and Lyn	
2009	"Why Are You Such a Nerd?"	XXX	
2011	"Don't Cry"	Park Bom	
2013	"You"	Brown Eyed Soul	
2013	"Runaway"	Kara	

== Theater ==
Year	English title	Korean title	Role	Ref.
2009	Beautiful Sunday	뷰티풀 선데이	Joon-seok	

== Discography ==
=== Soundtrack appearances ===
Title	Year	Album
"Oh-Sing-Sing-Men Oh Sing Sing Men" (with Ji Chang-wook, Lee Kwang-soo, Kim Young-kwang, Shin Won-ho, Sung-je, and Ji-hyuk)	2011	Bachelor's Vegetable Store OST Japanese release
"Star Candy"	2016	Gogh, The Starry Night OST

== Awards and nominations ==
Name of the award ceremony, year presented, category, nominee of the award, and the result of the nomination
Award ceremony	Year	Category	Nominee / Work	Result	Ref.
Asia Model Awards	2009	Best Fashion Model	Kim Young-kwang	Won	
Baeksang Arts Awards	2019	Best New Actor – Film	On Your Wedding Day	Won	
Blue Dragon Film Awards	2018	Best New Actor	On Your Wedding Day	Nominated	
Blue Dragon Film Awards	2018	Popular Star Award	On Your Wedding Day	Won	
Elle Style Awards	2018	Man of the Year	Kim Young-kwang	Won	
KBS Drama Awards	2013	Best New Actor	Good Doctor	Nominated	
KBS Drama Awards	2016	Excellence Award, Actor in a Miniseries	Sweet Stranger and Me	Nominated	
KBS Drama Awards	2025	Top Excellence Award, Actor	Walking on Thin Ice	Won	
KBS Drama Awards	2025	Best Couple Award	Kim Young-kwang (with Lee Young-ae); Walking on Thin Ice	Won	
Korea Culture and Entertainment Awards	2014	Best New Actor in a Film	Hot Young Bloods	Won	
Korea Fashion Photographers Association	2008	Best New Model	Kim Young-kwang	Won	
MBC Drama Awards	2017	Top Excellence Award, Actor in a Monday-Tuesday Drama	The Guardians	Nominated	
SBS Drama Awards	2014	New Star Award	Pinocchio	Won	
SBS Drama Awards	2019	Top Excellence Award, Actor in a Miniseries	The Secret Life of My Secretary	Nominated	
Style Icon Awards	2009	Style Icon, Model category	Kim Young-kwang	Won	
The Seoul Awards	2018	Best New Actor (Film)	On Your Wedding Day	Nominated	
