= Walking on Thin Ice (TV series) =

2025 South Korean television series

- Promotional poster
- Also known as: Eunsoo's Good Day
- Hangul: 은수 좋은 날
- RR: Eunsu joeun nal
- MR: Ŭnsu choŭn nal
- Genre: Crime thriller
- Written by: Jeon Young-shin
- Directed by: Song Hyun-wook
- Starring: Lee Young-ae; Kim Young-kwang; Park Yong-woo
- Music by: Taven
- Country of origin: South Korea
- Original language: Korean
- No. of episodes: 12

Production
- Executive producers: Kim Seung-ha; Lee Woong-hee; Choi Chang-oh; Jeong Yeon-ji
- Producers: Bae Seong-soo; Park Ho-sik; Ahn Chang-ho
- Running time: 70 minutes
- Production companies: Baram Pictures; Slingshot Studio

Original release
- Network: KBS2
- Release: September 20 – October 26, 2025

Walking on Thin Ice (Korean: 은수 좋은 날) is a South Korean crime thriller television series, starring Lee Young-ae, Kim Young-kwang and Park Yong-woo. It aired on KBS2 from September 20, to October 26, 2025, every Saturdays and Sundays at 21:20 (KST). It is also available for streaming on Coupang Play, Wavve, Viki, and Kocowa in selected territories.

== Synopsis ==
The series revolves around an ordinary housewife named Kang Eun-soo, who turns to crime by selling hundreds of billions of won worth of drugs, which she stumbles upon while trying to pay for the treatment of her terminally ill husband.

== Cast and characters ==
=== Main ===
- Lee Young-ae as Kang Eun-soo

An ordinary single mother.

- Kim Young-kwang as Lee Kyung

A teacher with a mysterious identity.

- Park Yong-woo as Jang Tae-gu

A detective who pursues Eun-soo.

=== Supporting ===
==== People around Eun-soo ====
- Bae Soo-bin as Park Do-jin

Eun-soo's husband. Diagnosed with pancreatic cancer, he has a warm and caring personality.

- Kim Si-a as Park Soo-ah

Eun-soo's daughter, an average student. She is good at drawing and has a crush on her art teacher Lee Kyung.

- Oh Yeon-ah as Baek Yeo-ju

Eun-soo's only friend and a contract employee at Happiness Bank. Unlike Eun-soo, she has become a full-time employee.

- Jo Yeon-hee as Yang Mi-yeon

A law professor who strives for perfection. She is concerned with education and academic background, and often says hurtful things to others without any ill intent.

- Seo Eun-sol as Yoon Jin-hee

Soo-ah's best friend and a member of the same art club.

- Lee Joo-yeon as Choi Yu-jeong

Soo-ah's friend. She followed Jin-hee to the art club and became close to Soo-ah.

==== Gwangnam Police Station (Jang Tae-gu's team) ====
- Hwang Jae-yeol as Detective Park
- Kwon Ji-woo as Choi Kyung-do
- Seo Ha-jung as Lee Eun-young

==== Others ====
- Do Sang-woo as Kang Hui-rim
- Won Hyun-joon as Do Kyu-man
- Lee Kyu-sung as Hwang Dong-hyun
- Son Bo-seung as Hwang Jun-hyun
- Kim Dong-won as Lee Hyuk
- Paek Eun-woo as Kim Min-woo
- Shin Jee-won as Soo-jin

A 24-year-old only daughter of the CEO of W Entertainment.

- Lee Ha-young as Mimi

A student who has studied abroad, she possesses a keen sense of humor and captivating charisma. She also possesses a keen eye for situations, making her a force to be reckoned with.

== Production ==
Eunsoo's Good Day is directed by Song Hyun-wook, and written by Jeon Young-shin, who co-wrote Argon (2017) and The Lies Within (2018). It is produced by Baram Pictures and Slingshot Studio.

== Viewership ==
Walking on Thin Ice : South Korea viewers per episode (thousands)

Season	Episode number												Average
Season	1	2	3	4	5	6	7	8	9	10	11	12	Average
1	685	666	630	545	957	888	830	761	607	645	667	886	731

Source: Audience measurement performed nationwide by Nielsen Korea.

Average TV viewership ratings
Ep.	Original broadcast date	Average audience share (Nielsen Korea)	
Ep.	Original broadcast date	Nationwide	Seoul
1	September 20, 2025	3.7% (11th)	3.2% (11th)
2	September 21, 2025	3.4% (12th)	3.3% (11th)
3	September 27, 2025	3.6% (12th)	3.6% (10th)
4	September 28, 2025	3.0% (17th)	2.9% (16th)
5	October 4, 2025	5.1% (5th)	5.1% (5th)
6	October 5, 2025	4.3% (8th)	4.4% (6th)
7	October 11, 2025	4.3% (9th)	4.5% (7th)
8	October 12, 2025	4.0% (14th)	3.9% (13th)
9	October 18, 2025	3.2% (17th)	3.2% (14th)
10	October 19, 2025	3.7% (12th)	3.7% (12th)
11	October 25, 2025	3.7% (13th)	3.6% (10th)
12	October 26, 2025	4.9% (7th)	4.5% (7th)
Average		3.9%	3.8%
In the table above, the blue numbers represent the lowest ratings and the red numbers represent the highest ratings.
