= Kiki (magazine) =

American girls magazine

- Editor-in-chief: Jamie Bryant
- Categories: Children's, fashion
- Frequency: Bi-monthly
- Publisher: B-books, Ltd.
- First issue: September 2007
- Final issue: Winter 2016
- Country: United States
- Based in: Cincinnati, Ohio
- Language: English
- Website: Kikimag.com
- ISSN: 1941-6350

Kiki was an interactive youth magazine published bi-monthly for girls between the ages of 8 and 14. The magazine had its headquarters in Cincinnati, Ohio.

== History and profile ==
Kiki was launched as a quarterly magazine in September 2007 by B-books, Ltd. Unlike typical fashion magazines oriented toward teenage readers, it emphasizes creative self-expression over glamour and beauty. It makes a point of avoiding common topics of celebrity gossip, romance, and trends; instead, it contains features such as interviews with students and professional designers, tips on managing money, and articles on fashion in world cultures. It also contains space for girls to write and draw directly on the magazine's pages, encouraging reader interaction. The magazine's tagline, “For girls with style and substance,” underscored its approach to fashion as a reflection of personal identity.

Kiki's staff had been a long time friend of Nancy Gruver, an entrepreneur who founded a feminist youth publication for girls of a similar age entitled New Moon Girls with her daughters. Like Kiki, New Moon Girls also features no ads, excluded certain common topics in favor of including articles that fostered self-esteem, body-positivity, and a sense of pride in being a girl, and included practical activities for the reader to engage in. Gruver had supported Kiki from the start and helped its staff to get the magazine off the ground. In the Winter 2016 double issue, Kiki announced that all Kiki subscribers would get an issue of New Moon Girls along with a free membership to the New Moon Girls online community.

Kiki's website announced in early 2016 that the Winter 2016 double issue would be the final issue of Kiki to be released. By April the website was rendered non-functional, and had ceased to be offered for subscription through Amazon. Kiki officially had folded.

== Content ==
The magazine featured 7 departments: From the Studio, Art Bin, World Beat, Biz Buzz, Kiki Care, Your Style, and Kiki Fun.

- From the Studio focused on design, textiles, shoes, fixing clothes, and other practical fashion topics.
- Art Bin focused on art tools and how-to projects.
- World Beat profiled cultural trends and cities with design traditions; cities featured to date have included New York City, London, and the Japanese cities of Tokyo and Osaka.
- Biz Buzz concerned the fashion industry and money management.
- Kiki Care dealt with grooming, health, and exercise. Your Style focuses on readers' everyday life.
- The final section, Kiki Fun, contained games, puzzles, and quizzes.
