= List of South Korean films of 2000 =

A list of films produced in South Korea in 2000:

English/Korean Title	Director	Cast	Genre	Notes
2000
Anarchists	Yu Yong-Sik	Jang Dong-gun; Kim Sang-Joong; Jeong Jun-Ho; Kim In-kwon	Action film	
Asako in Ruby Shoes	E J-yong	Lee Jung-jae		
Barking Dogs Never Bite	Bong Joon-ho	Lee Sung-jae; Bae Doona		
Bichunmoo	Kim Young-jun	Shin Hyun-joon; Kim Hee-sun		
Bloody Beach	Kim In-soo	Kim Hyun-jung; Lee Hyeon-gyun		
Bongja	Park Chul-soo	Seo Kap-sook; Shim Yi-young		
Chunhyang	Im Kwon-taek			Entered into the 2000 Cannes Film Festival
Coming Out	Kim Jee-woon	Gu Hye-ju, Shin Ha-kyun	Short	
Die Bad	Ryoo Seung-wan	Ryoo Seung-wan; Park Seong-bin; Ryoo Seung-bum		
Ditto	Kim Jung-kwon	Yoo Ji-tae; Kim Ha-neul		
The Foul King	Kim Jee-woon	Song Kang-ho		
Il Mare	Lee Hyun-seung	Lee Jung-jae; Jun Ji-hyun		
Interview (2000 film)	Byun Hyuk	Lee Jung-jae; Shim Eun-ha		
The Isle	Kim Ki-duk	Jung Suh		
Joint Security Area	Park Chan-wook	Song Kang-ho; Lee Byung-hun; Lee Young-ae		
Libera Me	Yang Yun-ho	Choi Min-soo		
Nightmare	Ahn Byeong-ki	Kim Gyu-ri; Choi Jung-yoon; Ha Ji-won	Slasher film	
Pisces	Kim Hyung-tae			
Real Fiction	Kim Ki-duk	Joo Jin-mo		Entered into the 23rd Moscow International Film Festival
The Record	Kim Ki-Hun	Lee Young-Ho		
Secret Tears	Park Ki-Hyung			
Tears	Im Sang-soo	Jun Han		
Virgin Stripped Bare by Her Bachelors	Hong Sang-su	Mun Seong-kun; Lee Eun-ju		Screened at the 2000 Cannes Film Festival
Vanishing Twin	Yoon Tae-yong	Ji Soo-won; Koo Pil-woo		
