= Yoo-jung =

- Hangul: 유정
- RR: Yujeong
- MR: Yujŏng
- IPA: [judʑʌŋ]

Yoo-jung, also spelled Yoo-jeong, or Yu-jeong, Yu-jung, is a Korean given name.

People with this name include:

== Actresses ==
- Ye Ji-won (born Lee Yoo-jung, 1973), South Korean actress
- Choi Yoo-jung (actress) (born 1976), South Korean actress
- Song Yoo-jung (1994–2021), South Korean actress
- Kim You-jung (born 1999), South Korean actress

== Singers ==
- May (singer) (born Bang Yu-jeong, 1982), South Korean female singer
- Choi Yoo-jung (singer) (born 1999), South Korean female singer, member of girl groups I.O.I and Weki Meki

== Other ==
- Yujeong (1544–1610), religious name of Samyeongdang, Joseon-era Buddhist monk
- Gim Yujeong (1908–1937), Korean male novelist of the Japanese colonial period
- Jeong You Jeong (born 1966), South Korean female novelist
- Chae Yoo-jung (born 1995), South Korean female badminton player
- Choi Yu-jung (ice hockey), South Korean female ice hockey player
- Jung Yoo-jung (born 1999), South Korean female murderer

== Fictional characters ==
- Lee Yoo-jeong, female character in 2008 South Korean film Night and Day, portrayed by Park Eun-hye
- Moon Yu-jeong, female character in 2006 South Korean film Maundy Thursday, portrayed by Lee Na-young

== See also ==
- List of Korean given names
