= Talkmon =

- Also known as: Talk Monster
- Genre: Talk show
- Written by: Kim Yoon-yeong, Lee Yoo-jin, Park Ki-hyeon
- Directed by: Park Sang-hyuk
- Presented by: Kang Ho-dong; Kim Hee-seon
- Country of origin: South Korea
- Original language: Korean
- No. of episodes: 12

Production
- Producers: Hyeon-don, Kwak Ji-hye
- Running time: 75 – 80 minutes per episode

Original release
- Network: tvN & O'live
- Release: January 15 – April 2, 2018

Talkmon (Korean: 토크몬) is a South Korean reality show. The show airs every Monday at 10:50 pm (KST) on cable channel O'live & tvN starting from January 15, 2018. It was later changed to 11:00 pm. It is the spin off of Island Trio which was aired at the same time-slot previously. The program director of this show is the same person who had created the Strong Heart talk show.

== Airtime ==
Air Date	Air Time
January 15, 2018 – February 12, 2018	10:50 pm
February 19 – April 2, 2018	11:00 pm

== Synopsis ==
Talkmon is a one-to-one talk battle between expert speaker in entertainment industry, Talk Master and hidden speaker in the industry, Talk Monster. At the end of the battle, the one who unveils the best story is selected amongst the Talk Monsters to be the Kingsmon.

== Hosts ==
=== Current MC ===
- Kang Ho-dong (Episode 1 - present)
- Kim Hee-sun (Episode 5 - present)

=== Past MC ===
- Jung Yong-hwa (Episode 1 – 4)

== Production ==
The idea of the show came out when the program director, Park Sang-hyuk was shooting for Island Trio, a healing travel show with Kang Ho-dong, Jung Yong-hwa & Kim Hee-sun. Whilst Kang Ho-dong & Jung Yong-hwa joined in together for Talkmon, Kim Hee-sun is said to back off from the new show in order to maintain the freshness for Island Trio's season 2, which is scheduled to run within the same year, 2018. However, Kim Hee-sun is said to willingly fill in as a guest whenever there are empty slots.

After Jung Yong-hwa's departure from the show, Kim Hee-sun is scheduled to record as the special MC on February 4, 2018, to fill in Jung Yong-hwa's absence and will be broadcast on February 12, 2018. It is later announced by O'live that she will become a fixed MC for the show instead of only a one-time appearance.

=== MC Departure ===
MC Jung Yong-hwa voluntarily departed from the show's MCing due to his graduate school controversy and will be enlisting in military on March 5, 2018. Jung's agency, FNC Entertainment announced:

"Due to the controversy surrounding Yong-hwa, he's taking responsibility, and because he doesn't want it to negatively impact the program, he's decided to leave the show along with agreement from the producers. We once again deeply apologize for disappointing the producers, the cast, and the viewers."

"Jung Yong-hwa will be notified of the entry (military enlistment) and will join on March 5th. As for '2018 JUNG YONG HWA LIVE [ROOM 622]', after Hong Kong concert on January 27th, it is necessary to cancel all future overseas tour schedules. Thank you for your patience and understanding from the fans of Korea and abroad who have paid attention and spent your precious time."

== Talk Masters ==
Talk Masters	Episodes appeared
Lee Soo-geun	1-End
Shindong (Super Junior)	1-End
Jang Do-yeon	1-4, 7-End
Hong Eun-hee	1-4
Soyou (Sistar)	1-2
DinDin	3-4, 7-8
Heo Kyung-hwan	5-6
Park So-jin (Girl's Day)	5-6
Hwang Je-seong	5-6, 9-End
Park Ji-woo	7-8
Muzie (Singer-Songwriter)	9-10

== Episodes ==
Name sequence of Talk Masters & Talk Monsters are from left to right as seen on the show's seating arrangement.

Episode	Date aired	Talk Masters	Talk Monsters	Kingsmon
1	January 15, 2018	Jang Do-yeon, Hong Eun-hee, Lee Soo-geun, Soyou (Sistar) & Shindong (super Junior)	Jung Yong-joo (musical actress), Kwon Hyuk-soo, Shin Yoo (trot singer), J-Black (dancer), Im Hyun-sik & Park In-hwan	J-Black
2	January 22, 2018	Jang Do-yeon, Hong Eun-hee, Lee Soo-geun, Soyou (Sistar) & Shindong (super Junior)	Jung Yong-joo (musical actress), Kwon Hyuk-soo, Shin Yoo (trot singer), J-Black (dancer), Im Hyun-sik & Park In-hwan	J-Black
3	January 29, 2018	Jang Do-yeon, Hong Eun-hee, Lee Soo-geun, DinDin & Shindong	Jeon Sung-woo, Lee Jong-beom, Sunmi, JooE (Momoland) & Kim Kwang-sik (actor)	Lee Jung-Beom
4	February 5, 2018	Jang Do-yeon, Hong Eun-hee, Lee Soo-geun, DinDin & Shindong	Jeon Sung-woo, Lee Jong-beom, Sunmi, JooE (Momoland) & Kim Kwang-sik (actor)	Lee Jung-Beom
5	February 12, 2018	Park So-jin (Girl's Day), Hwang Je-seong (comedian), Lee Soo-geun, Heo Kyung-hwan & Shindong	Christian Burgos (non summit), Kim Yeon-ja (trot singer), Lee Hye-jung (model), Hyun Young, Park Ji-woo	Park Ji-woo
6	February 19, 2018	Park So-jin (Girl's Day), Hwang Je-seong (comedian), Lee Soo-geun, Heo Kyung-hwan & Shindong	Christian Burgos (non summit), Kim Yeon-ja (trot singer), Lee Hye-jung (model), Hyun Young, Park Ji-woo	Park Ji-woo
7	February 26, 2018	Park Ji-woo, Dindin, Lee Soo-geun, Jang Do-yeon & Shindong	Solbi, Wendy & Kang Seulgi (Red Velvet), Jeong Yu-mi, Kang Ji-sub & Seo Jeong-hak (Baritone)	Seo Jeong-hak
8	March 5, 2018	Park Ji-woo, Dindin, Lee Soo-geun, Jang Do-yeon & Shindong	Solbi, Wendy & Kang Seulgi (Red Velvet), Jeong Yu-mi, Kang Ji-sub & Seo Jeong-hak (Baritone)	Seo Jeong-hak
9	March 12, 2018	Jang Do-yeon, Hwang Je-seong, Lee Soo-geun, Shindong & Muzie (singer-songwriter)	B.I & Koo Jun-hoe (iKon), Cha Soon-Bae (Actor) Ock Joo-hyun, Min Woo-hyuk (Musical Actor), Yoo Tae-Pyeongyang (Traditional Music Singer)	Cha Soon-bae
10	March 19, 2018	Jang Do-yeon, Hwang Je-seong, Lee Soo-geun, Shindong & Muzie (singer-songwriter)	B.I & Koo Jun-hoe (iKon), Cha Soon-Bae (Actor) Ock Joo-hyun, Min Woo-hyuk (Musical Actor), Yoo Tae-Pyeongyang (Traditional Music Singer)	Cha Soon-bae
11	March 26, 2018	Jang Do-yeon, Hwang Je-seong, Shindong, Lee Soo-geun	Kang Eun-tak (actor), Jung Soo-Yeong (actress), Choo Sung-hoon, & Moon Gabi (model)	
12	April 2, 2018	Jang Do-yeon, Hwang Je-seong, Shindong, Lee Soo-geun	Kim Seol-jin (Choreographer), K.will, Choi Il-goo, Su-hyeon (AKMU)	

== Ratings ==
In the tables below, the blue numbers represent the lowest ratings and the red numbers represent the highest ratings.

Ep.	Date Broadcast	AGB Nielsen				TNMS
Ep.	Date Broadcast	Nationwide	Rank	Seoul	Rank	TNMS
1	January 15, 2018	2.336%	2nd	2.204%	4th	1.9%
2	January 22, 2018	1.837%	6th	2.059%	5th	1.7%
3	January 29, 2018	1.0%	N/A			1.1%
4	February 5, 2018	0.9%	N/A			1.2%
5	February 12, 2018	1.520%	10th	1.633%	6th	1.4%
6	February 19, 2018	1.647%	3rd	2.053%	2nd	1.1%
7	February 26, 2018	1.3%	N/A	1.558%	6th	0.8%
8	March 5, 2018	1.1%	N/A			0.9%
9	March 12, 2018	1.2%	N/A			0.7%
10	March 19, 2018	0.6%	N/A			1.0%
11	March 26, 2018	1.2%	N/A			1.1%
12	April 2, 2018	1.382%	8th	1.549%	4th	0.7%

Note: This show airs on a cable channel/pay TV which normally has a relatively smaller audience compared to free-to-air TV/public broadcasters (KBS, SBS, MBC & EBS).
