= Hwasin: Controller of the Heart =

South Korean television series

- Also known as: Hwashin; Talk God
- Hangul: 화신 – 마음을 지배하는 자
- Hanja: 話神 – 마음을 支配하는 者
- RR: Hwasin – maeumeul jibaehaneun ja
- MR: Hwasin – maŭmŭl chibaehanŭn cha
- Genre: Talk show
- Starring: Shin Dong-yup; Kim Hee-sun; Kim Gu-ra; Bong Tae-gyu
- Country of origin: South Korea
- Original language: Korean
- No. of episodes: 31

Production
- Producers: Shin Hyo-jung; Shim Sung-min
- Running time: 70–90 minutes per episode

Original release
- Network: SBS
- Release: February 19 – October 1, 2013

Hwasin – Controller of the Heart (Korean: 화신 – 마음을 지배하는 자) was a South Korean talk show which aired from February 19 to October 1, 2013 on Tuesday nights at 11:20 pm KST on SBS. It was hosted by comedian Shin Dong-yup, actress Kim Hee-sun, and singer Yoon Jong-shin. Hwasin has several meanings, including God of Tuesday (화요일의 신; 火神) and God of Talk (화술의 신; 話神), as well as Shin Dong-yup and Yoon Jong-shin's Shin (신), and Goddess (여신) Kim Hee-sun. The program was referred to as the second season of Strong Heart, but with a different format focused on exploring lifestyle differences between generations through surveys to viewers. On May 1, 2013, it was announced that comedian Kim Gu-ra would join the program as new host, marking his return to SBS since his sudden departure from television in April 2012. The program's format was also changed, abandoning the viewer surveys and focusing on people instead. The first episode to air with Kim Gu-ra and a new format aired May 14, 2013. On May 9, 2013, it was announced that Yoon Jong-shin will be leaving the show due to schedule and health issues. He was replaced by actor Bong Tae-gyu, who was a guest on the May 14th episode, and officially as new host airing May 21, 2013. After a seven-month run, Hwasin was officially cancelled due to low ratings on September 24, 2013, and was replaced by reality program Beating Heart.

== Format ==
=== Episode 1–11 ===
Every week, thousands of viewers respond to surveys asking about different lifestyle issues. The different topics are reenacted through sketches with the hosts and guests. The guests must guess the #1 answers of different generations of viewers (10s to 50s) or of men and women in later episodes. Incorrect answers will be punished with a blast of air. The format is similar to past popular SBS talk shows, Ya Sim Man Man and Shin Dong-yup & Kim Won-hee's Hey Hey Hey, combining a ranking talk show with comedy sketches.

=== Episode 12–26, 28–29 ===
The format changes to a talk show focusing on people and life. New corners were created to emphasize life of people. A Line of Strength (한 줄의 힘) is a corner where guests bring a line (a meaningful saying or phrase) to explore ways of overcoming difficulties and hardships in life. Beginning with episode 13, Heard It As A Rumor (풍문으로 들었소) became the second new corner which focuses on rumors of the guests.

=== Episode 27, 30–31 ===
A special live episode titled, The Hwashin Live (a parody of The Terror Live), aired with an experimental format featuring an all live broadcast with no editing. As the first live talk show to ever air on South Korean television, the format brought four guests each with a question they would like to ask the general public and discuss in studio. Viewers could vote through SMS voting during the show, and the result would be shown on air. With no delay or editing, there is no margin for error as everything happening in studio would be broadcast live, bringing a thrill to the live format.

For episode 30, the show officially switched to an all live format titled, Live Hwasin – Hot Potato. The format is similar to the experimental episode featuring questions asked to the general public and SMS voting. Questions are known as "Hot Potatoes", which are recent hot topics in society and are discussed by the hosts and guests in an effort to identify with viewers. The second part of the live program, Star Potato, is the same as the previous live format where the guests ask the viewers a question. For episode 31, the show was simply titled, Live Hwasin, and followed a similar format to episode 27.

== Hosts ==
- Shin Dong-yup (February 19, 2013 – October 1, 2013)
- Kim Hee-sun (February 19, 2013 – October 1, 2013)
- Yoon Jong-shin (February 19 – May 14, 2013)
- Kim Gu-ra (May 14, 2013 – October 1, 2013)
- Bong Tae-gyu (May 21, 2013 – October 1, 2013)

== List of episodes ==
Episode #	Original airdate	Guests
1	February 19, 2013	Lee Su-geun, Eun Ji-won, Kim Jong-min, Jun Hyun-moo
2	February 26, 2013	Lee Su-geun, Eun Ji-won, Kim Jong-min, Jun Hyun-moo
2	February 26, 2013	Park Ji-young, Kang Hye-jung, Jung Man-sik, Hong Seok-cheon, Kwang-hee
3	March 5, 2013	Park Ji-young, Kang Hye-jung, Jung Man-sik, Hong Seok-cheon, Kwang-hee
4	March 12, 2013	So Yi-hyun, Bae Soo-bin, Im Seul-ong, Kim Je-dong
5	March 19, 2013	Kim Bum-soo, Kim Tae-woo, Kim Eung-su, Park Gyu-ri
6	March 26, 2013	G-Dragon, Dae-sung, Kahi, Kim Kyung-ho, Noh Sa-yeon
7	April 2, 2013	Jang Gwang, Gong Hyung-jin, Kim Kyung-ran, Shim Yi-young, Kim Woo-bin
8	April 9, 2013	Simon Dominic, Jung Eun-ji, Yang Hee-eun, Lee Soo-young, Lee Do-young
9	April 16, 2013	Kim Young-ok, Kim Soo-mi, JK Kim Dong-wook, Jay Park, Yim Si-wan, Choi Pil-lip
10	April 23, 2013	Lee Kyung-kyu, Kim In-kwon, Ryu Hyun-kyung, Yoo Yeon-seok
11	April 30, 2013	Lee Kyung-kyu, Kim In-kwon, Ryu Hyun-kyung, Yoo Yeon-seok
12	May 7, 2013	Cultwo, Choi Hwa-jung, Jung Sun-hee, Jang Gi-ha
13	May 14, 2013	Seo In-guk, Bong Tae-gyu, Choi Kang-hee, Park Jung-chul
14	May 21, 2013	Lee Chang-hoon, Sung Si-kyung, Taecyeon, Nichkhun, Chansung
15	May 28, 2013	Jang Hyuk, Jeong Yu-mi, Kim Ji-seok, Shin Seung-hwan
16	June 4, 2013	Yoon Sang-hyun, Lee Bo-young, Lee Jong-suk
17	June 11, 2013	Jang Yun-jeong, Yoon Do-hyun, Park Ji-yoon
18	June 25, 2013	Lee Hyori, Sandara Park, CL, Lee Joon
19	July 2, 2013	Jang Yun-jeong, Yoon Do-hyun, Park Ji-yoon (2)
19	July 2, 2013	Lee Hyori, Sandara Park, CL, Lee Joon (2)
20	July 9, 2013	Ahn Mun-sook, Seo In-young, Im Soo-hyang, Choi Won-young
21	July 16, 2013	Lee Sang-woo, Nam Sang-mi, Jang Young-nam, Kim Ji-hoon
22	July 23, 2013	IU, Park Hyung-sik, Hwang Kwang-hee, Lee Hyun-woo
23	July 30, 2013	Jung Woong-in, Soyou, Hyolyn, Lee Yu-bi
24	August 6, 2013	Lee Jung-hyun, Kim Hyun-joong, Kim Sung-kyung, Kim Hyun-wook
25	August 13, 2013	Jang Hyuk, Park Eun-hye, Hong Eun-hee
26	August 20, 2013	Moon Hee-joon, Danny Ahn, Eun Ji-won, Tony An, Chun Myeong-hoon
27	August 27, 2013	Kim Jun-ho, Kim Dae-hee, Clara, Seungri
28	September 3, 2013	Yang Dong-geun, Oh Yoon-ah, Jung Joon, Kwon Ri-se, So-jung
29	September 10, 2013	Kim Byeong-ok, Han Seung-yeon, Uee
30	September 24, 2013	Im Chang-jung, Jung Sun-hee, Kim Ji-hoon
31	October 1, 2013	Park Myung-soo, Chun Jung-myung, Kim Yoon-sung

== Ratings ==
In the ratings below, the highest rating for the show will in be red, and the lowest rating for the show will be in blue.

List of ratings

Episode #	Original Airdate	TNmS Ratings		AGB Ratings	
Episode #	Original Airdate	Nationwide	Seoul National Capital Area	Nationwide	Seoul National Capital Area
1	February 19, 2013	9.0%	11.3%	8.4%	10.0%
2	February 26, 2013	7.6%	9.0%	8.5%	10.2%
3	March 5, 2013	6.0%	<(8.1%)	6.3%	<(8.3%)
4	March 12, 2013	6.8%	<(8.2%)	7.0%	8.1%
5	March 19, 2013	7.1%	8.8%	6.9%	<(8.4%)
6	March 26, 2013	7.2%	8.6%	6.9%	<(8.8%)
7	April 2, 2013	6.2%	<(8.3%)	6.9%	<(8.3%)
8	April 9, 2013	4.6%	<(8.1%)	4.9%	<(8.3%)
9	April 16, 2013	3.8%	<(8.3%)	4.8%	<(8.0%)
10	April 23, 2013	5.0%	<(8.0%)	5.4%	<(8.0%)
11	April 30, 2013	4.4%	<(7.3%)	5.3%	<(7.8%)
12	May 7, 2013	4.7%	<(7.7%)	6.0%	<(7.1%)
13	May 14, 2013	4.5%	<(7.2%)	5.3%	<(8.0%)
14	May 21, 2013	5.1%	<(7.3%)	5.9%	<(6.8%)
15	May 28, 2013	4.7%	<(7.6%)	5.6%	<(8.4%)
16	June 4, 2013	5.2%	<(7.5%)	5.8%	<(7.1%)
17	June 11, 2013	5.5%	<(8.6%)	7.1%	7.9%
18	June 25, 2013	5.9%	8.2%	6.3%	<(6.9%)
19	July 2, 2013	4.6%	<(9.2%)	5.5%	<(8.5%)
20	July 9, 2013	4.4%	<(7.8%)	5.9%	<(8.5%)
21	July 16, 2013	4.9%	<(8.3%)	6.8%	<(8.4%)
22	July 23, 2013	5.5%	<(9.1%)	6.4%	<(8.7%)
23	July 30, 2013	6.2%	<(8.3%)	6.9%	8.2%
24	August 6, 2013	4.7%	<(7.8%)	5.0%	<(7.5%)
25	August 13, 2013	5.5%	<(7.5%)	6.1%	<(7.2%)
26	August 20, 2013	4.3%	<(7.4%)	5.2%	<(7.4%)
27	August 27, 2013	4.3%	<(8.6%)	4.5%	<(7.7%)
28	September 3, 2013	3.4%	<(7.2%)	3.8%	<(7.8%)
29	September 10, 2013	4.0%	<(8.3%)	4.4%	<(8.1%)
30	September 24, 2013	3.1%	<(8.8%)	4.2%	<(8.6%)
31	October 1, 2013		<(8.2%)	3.3%	<(8.4%)
