= Kim Hye-ri =

Kim Hye-ri may refer to:

- Kim Hye-ri (actress), South Korean actress
- Kim Hye-ri (footballer), South Korean footballer

== See also ==
- Kim Hye-rin (disambiguation)
