= Choi Yoo-jung =

Choi Yoo-jung (Korean: 최유정) may refer to:

- Choi Yoo-jung (actress) (born 1976), South Korean actress
- Choi Yoo-jung (footballer) (born 1992), South Korean footballer
- Choi Yoo-jung (singer) (born 1999), South Korean singer
- Choi Yu-jung (ice hockey) (born 2000), South Korean ice hockey player
