= Kim Hye-rin =

Kim Hye-rin (김혜린) may refer to:

- Kim Hye-rin (artist) (born 1962), South Korean manhwa artist
- Kim Hae-lin (born 1995), South Korean figure skater
- Kim Hye-rin (badminton) (born 1995), South Korean badminton player
- Kim Hye-rin (curler) (born 1999), South Korean curler
