= Choi Kwon-soo =

South Korean actor

- Born: October 5, 2004 (age 21); Busan, South Korea
- Occupation: Actor
- Years active: 2014–present

Korean name
- Hangul: 최권수
- RR: Choe Gwonsu
- MR: Ch'oe Kwŏnsu

Choi Kwon-soo (born October 5, 2004) is a South Korean actor. He began his career as a child actor.

== Filmography ==
=== Films ===
Year	Title	Role
2016	Hiya	Lee Jin-sang (young)

=== Television series ===
Year	Title	Role
2014	Wonderful Days	Kang Dong-won
2014	Naeil's Cantabile	Cha Yoo-jin (young)
2015	Super Daddy Yeol	Lee Min-woo
2015	Splendid Politics	Hong Joo-won (child)
2015	KBS Drama Special: The Brother's Summer	Choi Dong-gil
2016	One More Happy Ending	Song Soo-hyuk (young)
2017	Ms. Perfect	Goo Jin-wook
2017	Dal Soon's Spring	Seo Hyun-do (young)
2018	Grand Prince	Lee Kang (young)
2018	Heart Surgeons	Park Tae-soo (young)
2020	Flower of Evil	Baek Hee-sung (young)

== Awards and nominations ==
Year	Award	Category	Nominated work	Result	Ref.
2014	3rd APAN Star Awards	Best Young Actor	Wonderful Days	Won	
2014	28th KBS Drama Awards	Best Young Actor	Wonderful Days	Nominated	
2015	29th KBS Drama Awards	Best Young Actor	The Brothers' Summer	Won	
