= Bichunmoo =

- Hangul: 비천무
- Hanja: 飛天舞
- RR: Bicheonmu
- MR: Pich'ŏnmu
- Directed by: Kim Young-jun
- Written by: Jeong Yong-ki; Kim Young-jun
- Based on: Bichunmoo by Kim Hye-rin
- Produced by: Lee Tae-won; Yoo Jung-ho
- Starring: Shin Hyun-joon; Kim Hee-sun; Jung Jin-young
- Cinematography: Byun Hee-sung; Kim Tae-hwan
- Edited by: Lee Hyun-mee
- Music by: Kim Seong-jun
- Production company: Taewon Entertainment
- Distributed by: Cinema Service
- Release date: July 1, 2000
- Running time: 126 minutes
- Country: South Korea
- Language: Korean
- Budget: US $4,000,000

Bichunmoo (Korean: 비천무; RR: Bicheonmu) is a 2000 South Korean martial arts fantasy drama film written and directed by Kim Young-jun and featuring Shin Hyun-joon, Kim Hee-sun, and Jung Jin-young. At the time of its release, it was the most expensive film in Korean history (it was supplanted in 2001 by Musa).

The film was based on a 1986 manhwa (Korean comic) called Bichunmoo (The Dance in the Sky) by Kim Hye-rin.

== Plot ==
In 12th-century China/Goryeo, during Mongol rule, childhood sweethearts Jinha and Sullie are later separated at adolescence but vow to re-unite, despite Sullie telling Jinha of her father's arrangement of marriage.

Orphan Jinha begins training in the Bichun martial arts (taught by his apparent aging uncle) and discovers his father was a noble swordsman of a renowned House, murdered by the Mongol army, led by Korean rivals seeking the secrets of the Bichun martial arts. As told by his dying uncle, who at his death bed reveals his true identity as one his father's guards, Kwakjung, suffering from a wound by assassins.

Meanwhile, Sullie's father, a Mongol general, arranges for her to marry a Mongol noble. Believing Jinha to be shot dead by arrows, after he is found to be both the heir of the rival house and a rival to her future suitor, Sullie marries the noble.

After his rescue by a fisherman and recovering from near-death, Jinha takes on the persona of bandit Jahalang, and begins an anti-Mongol crusade with the help of his rebel army of Bichun warriors. After multiple successes across the kingdom, Jinha personally ambushes and kills the aging Mongol general in a ritual execution, as revenge for being one of those behind the plot against his family.

Finally Jin-ha and Sullie are re-united, when Jinha's bandit warriors infiltrate Sullie's family manor.the

== Cast ==
- Shin Hyun-joon as Yu Jinha
- Kim Hee-sun as Sullie
- Jung Jin-young as Namgung Junkwang
- Jang Dong-Jik as Lai
- Choi Yoo-jung as Yeojin
- Gi Ju-bong as Kwakjung
- Bang Hyep as Namgung Sung
- Kim Hak-cheol as Taruga
- Kim Soo-ro as Ashin
- Lee Han-gal as Changryun
- Seo Tae-hwa as Saijune

== Production ==
Bichunmoo was shot entirely in China, with a Hong Kong–based martial arts director.

== Criticism ==
In spite of its financial success, the film was heavily criticized on its initial release in Korea, primarily due to its alleged disloyalty to the comic book on which it was based. Another argument given against the film was the casting choice of Kim Hee-sun, who was perceived as being too modern for a period swordplay film.

== Reception ==
Alan Morrison of Empire called Bichunmoo a "Top-notch martial arts action".
