= Oh Dae-gyu =

South Korean actor (born 1968)

- Born: February 16, 1968 (age 58); South Korea
- Education: Chung-Ang University – theater and film Korea University Graduate School – master's degree in journalism
- Occupation: Actor
- Years active: 1988–present

Korean name
- Hangul: 오대규
- Hanja: 吳大奎
- RR: O Daegyu
- MR: O Taegyu

Oh Dae-gyu (Korean: 오대규; born February 16, 1968) is a South Korean actor. He appears in television dramas, notably First Wives' Club (2007), Three Brothers (2009), and War of the Roses (2011).

He has been called the "South Korean Mark Ruffalo".

== Filmography ==
=== Television series ===
| Year | Title | Role |
|---|---|---|
| 1988 | Sandcastle | Kim Dong-hyun |
| 1989 | The Region of Calm | Lee Kang-seok |
| 1991 | Door of Solitude | Joon-soo |
| 1992 | Rose Garden | |
| 1992 | Love Without Fear | Nam Ki-woo |
| 1993 | Theme Series: "Father, One Day Suddenly" | |
| 1993 | The Faraway Ssongba River | Corporal Gu |
| 1994 | Scent of Love | Min-gu |
| 1994 | The Woman in the Matchbox | Hee-joon |
| 1995 | Confession | Kim Chang-soo |
| 1995 | Their Own Santa | |
| 1995 | Inside the Mysterious Mirror | Lee Hyun-seok |
| 1995 | Do You Remember Love? | Min-jae |
| 1996 | Wealthy Yu-chun | Jung Ji-seok |
| 1996 | Thief | Jang Hyung-jo |
| 1996 | Splendid Holiday | Detective Jo Yong-hyun |
| 1997 | Into the Storm | Choi Gi-chul |
| 1997 | Woman Next Door | Lee Eung-sik |
| 1997 | Beautiful Crime | Byeong-gyu |
| 1998 | The Eldest | |
| 1999 | Queen | |
| 1999 | Who Are You? | Dong Jae-gyu |
| 2000 | Medical Center | Resident Jang Se-jin |
| 2001 | Cool | Park Hyun-jae |
| 2001 | Third Coincidence | Woo Seung-jae |
| 2001 | Lovers | |
| 2001 | SBS TV Literature Award Winner: "Summer Story" | Teacher |
| 2002 | Man of the Sun, Lee Je-ma | Jang Sang-wook |
| 2002 | Sunrise House | Kang Joon-tae |
| 2003 | HDTV Literature: "The Fragrant Well" | Seo Kyung-hoon |
| 2004 | Sunlight Pours Down | Oh Dal-jae |
| 2004 | Little Women | Oh Geon-tae |
| 2005 | Love Needs a Miracle | Jin Jung-soo |
| 2006 | I'll Go with You | Jung-wan |
| 2006 | Love and Hate | Park Jae-hyuk |
| 2007 | First Wives' Club | Lee Ki-jeok |
| 2009 | Temptation of an Angel | Fake Shin Hyun-woo (cameo, episode 15) |
| 2009 | Three Brothers | Kim Hyun-chal |
| 2011 | War of the Roses | Park Dae-sung |
| 2011 | Living in Style | Shin Ki-han |
| 2012 | Five Fingers | Hong Soo-pyo |
| 2013 | Princess Aurora | Oh Soo-sung |
| 2013 | Passionate Love | Yoo Min-soo |
| 2015 | Make a Woman Cry | Kang Jin-myung |

=== Film ===
| Year | Title | Role |
|---|---|---|
| 2005 | Daddy-Long-Legs | Doctor (cameo) |

== Musical theatre ==
| Year | Title | Role |
|---|---|---|
| 1990 | I'll Go and Come Back Safely | |

== Awards and nominations ==
| Year | Award | Category | Nominated work | Result |
|---|---|---|---|---|
| 1993 | SBS Drama Awards | Best New Actor | The Faraway Ssongba River | Won |
| 2007 | SBS Drama Awards | Best Supporting Actor in a Serial Drama | Love and Hate, First Wives' Club | Won |
| 2011 | SBS Drama Awards | Top Excellence Award, Actor in a Weekend/Daily Drama | War of the Roses | Nominated |
| 2018 | SBS Drama Awards | Top Excellence Award, Actor in a Daily and Weekend Drama | Happy Sisters | Nominated |
