= Hong Hwa-ri =

South Korean actress (born 2005)

- Born: February 21, 2005 (age 21); Seoul, South Korea
- Occupation: Actress
- Parent: Hong Sung-heon (father)

Korean name
- Hangul: 홍화리
- RR: Hong Hwari
- MR: Hong Hwari

Hong Hwa-ri (Korean: 홍화리; born February 21, 2005) is a South Korean actress.

== Filmography ==
=== Film ===
Year	Title	Role
2015	Love Forecast	young Kim Hyun-woo

=== Television series ===
Year	Title	Role
2014	Wonderful Days	Kang Dong-joo
2015	Blood	

== Awards and nominations ==
Year	Award	Category	Nominated work	Result
2014	7th Korea Drama Awards	Best Young Actress	Wonderful Days	Nominated
2014	KBS Drama Awards	Best Young Actress	Wonderful Days	Won
