= Wonderful Days (TV series) =

2014 South Korean TV series

- Promotional poster
- Also known as: Very Good Times
- Hangul: 참 좋은 시절
- Hanja: 참 좋은 時節
- RR: Cham joeun sijeol
- MR: Ch'am choŭn sijŏl
- Genre: Melodrama; Family; Romance
- Written by: Lee Kyung-hee
- Directed by: Kim Jin-won
- Starring: Lee Seo-jin; Kim Hee-sun; Ok Taec-yeon
- Country of origin: South Korea
- Original language: Korean
- No. of episodes: 50

Production
- Executive producer: Moon Bo-hyun
- Producer: Han Sang-woo
- Production location: Korea
- Running time: Saturdays and Sundays at 19:55 (KST)
- Production company: Samhwa Networks

Original release
- Network: Korean Broadcasting System
- Release: 22 February – 10 August 2014

Wonderful Days (Korean: 참 좋은 시절) is a 2014 South Korean television series starring Lee Seo-jin, Kim Hee-sun and Ok Taec-yeon. It aired on KBS2 from February 22 to August 10, 2014 on Saturdays and Sundays at 19:55 for 50 episodes. Written by Lee Kyung-hee, the drama tells the story of a prosecutor who returns to his hometown after 15 years and tries to reconnect with his long-estranged family and friends.

== Synopsis ==
Kang Dong-seok overcame poverty and left his small town to become a successful prosecutor. A genius with an aloof kind of charisma, his arrogance and ill temper puts him at odds with many people, including his estranged family. After 15 years, Dong-seok is transferred back to his hometown and reconnects with his roots, re-learning the value of neighborly warmth in the countryside and the true meaning of love and family. His misfit siblings include Dong-hee, his younger brother who works for a money-lending business; his older brother Dong-tak, an events emcee who dreams of becoming an actor; and his twin sister Dong-ok, who is developmentally challenged and remained in a childlike state ever since an accident during their childhood.

Quick-tempered and swift-fisted, Dong-hee was kicked out of high school for getting into a brawl in an attempt to protect his classmate Seo Jeong-ah, who came to him three months later to tell him that she's pregnant. Nine years later, Dong-hee finds himself living with Seo's twins, who are being raised as his siblings, while scraping together a living as a bodyguard in the same company as Dong-seok's first love, Cha Hae-won. Despite her hardships in life, such as her father's bankruptcy, Hae-won is an upbeat woman, and eventually the feelings between her and Dong-seok are rekindled.

== Cast ==
=== Main ===
- Lee Seo-jin as Kang Dong-suk
  - Park Bo-gum as young Dong-suk
- Kim Hee-sun as Cha Hae-won
  - Kwon Mina as young Hae-won
- Ok Taec-yeon as Kang Dong-hee

Dong-seok's younger brother

=== Supporting ===
Kang family

- Ryu Seung-soo as Kang Dong-tak

Dong-seok's older brother

- Kim Ji-ho as Kang Dong-ok
  - Lee Hye-in as young Dong-ok

Dong-seok's twin sister

- Kim Yeong-cheol as Kang Tae-sub,

Dong-seok's, Dong-tak's, Dong-hee's, Dong-ok's father

- Youn Yuh-jung as Jang So-shim

Dong-seok's, Dong-tak's, Dong-hee's, Dong-ok's mother

- Choi Hwa-jung as Ha Young-choon,

Tae-seob's second wife and Dong-hee's biological mother

- Oh Hyun-kyung as Kang Ki-soo

Dong-seok's, Dong-tak's, Dong-hee's, Dong-ok's grandfather

- Kim Sang-ho as Kang Ssang-shik

Dong-suk's uncle

- Kim Kwang-kyu as Kang Ssang-ho,

Dong-seok's uncle

- Kim Dan-yool as Kang Mool,

Dong-tak's son

- Hong Hwa-ri as Kang Dong-joo,

Dong-hee's twin daughter

- Choi Kwon-soo as Kang Dong-won,

Dong-hee's twin son

Cha family

- Jin Kyung as Cha Hae-joo

Hae-won's older sister and becoming wife of Dong-tak's

- Noh Kyung-joo as Lee Myung-soon

Hae-won's mother

=== Extended ===
- Park Joo-hyung as

Oh Seung-hoon, Dong Hee's boss

- Yoon Yoo-sun as Jo Young-ran
- Go In-bum as Oh Chi-soo

Seung-hoon's father

- Choi Woong as Min Woo-jin

Dong-ok's love interest

- Yoon Ji-sook as Choi Mi-sook
- Jang Joon-yoo as Han Jae-kyung
- Oh Yong as Park Kyung-soo
- Lee Yoo-joon as Bong Gook-soo
- Kim Kwang-min as Jo Won
- Lee Cho-hee as Seo Jung-ah

Dong-hee's ex and mother of twins

- Seo Hyun-chul as Han Bin / Hwang Gil-sang

== Ratings ==
In the tables below, the blue numbers represent the lowest ratings and the red numbers represent the highest ratings.

Episode #	Original broadcast date	Average audience share			
Episode #	Original broadcast date	TNmS Ratings		AGB Nielsen	
Episode #	Original broadcast date	Nationwide	Seoul National Capital Area	Nationwide	Seoul National Capital Area
1	February 22, 2014	25.2% (1st)	26.8% (1st)	23.8% (1st)	23.7% (1st)
2	February 23, 2014	29.6% (1st)	32.3% (1st)	30.3% (1st)	30.7% (1st)
3	March 1, 2014	26.8% (1st)	27.8% (1st)	26.4% (1st)	26.7% (1st)
4	March 2, 2014	27.9% (1st)	30.9% (1st)	27.9% (1st)	27.7% (1st)
5	March 8, 2014	25.6% (1st)	26.8% (1st)	24.0% (1st)	23.7% (1st)
6	March 9, 2014	28.0% (1st)	29.6% (1st)	28.1% (1st)	27.3% (1st)
7	March 15, 2014	23.6% (1st)	24.6% (1st)	24.8% (1st)	24.5% (1st)
8	March 16, 2014	26.1% (1st)	27.8% (1st)	28.3% (1st)	27.9% (1st)
9	March 22, 2014	23.7% (1st)	24.7% (1st)	25.2% (1st)	25.4% (1st)
10	March 23, 2014	26.7% (1st)	28.0% (1st)	27.1% (1st)	27.4% (1st)
11	March 29, 2014	24.5% (1st)	25.7% (1st)	23.7% (1st)	22.5% (1st)
12	March 30, 2014	25.7% (1st)	33.9% (1st)	33.0% (1st)	34.3% (1st)
13	April 5, 2014	22.3% (1st)	24.4% (1st)	22.4% (1st)	22.3% (1st)
14	April 6, 2014	24.9% (1st)	27.0% (1st)	24.9% (1st)	24.6% (1st)
15	April 12, 2014	22.0% (1st)	23.1% (1st)	21.9% (1st)	21.6% (1st)
16	April 13, 2014	23.2% (1st)	25.0% (1st)	24.1% (1st)	24.3% (1st)
17	April 19, 2014	18.7% (1st)	19.5% (1st)	19.4% (1st)	18.6% (1st)
18	April 20, 2014	21.5% (1st)	22.8% (1st)	23.4% (1st)	24.0% (1st)
19	April 26, 2014	23.2% (1st)	24.4% (1st)	24.2% (1st)	24.9% (1st)
20	April 27, 2014	27.0% (1st)	28.1% (1st)	27.9% (1st)	27.3% (1st)
21	May 5, 2014	21.7% (1st)	22.9% (1st)	22.3% (1st)	22.4% (1st)
22	May 4, 2014	23.0% (1st)	24.6% (1st)	21.4% (1st)	21.8% (1st)
23	May 10, 2014	22.0% (1st)	23.1% (1st)	22.7% (1st)	21.5% (1st)
24	May 11, 2014	24.3% (1st)	25.5% (1st)	26.6% (1st)	26.3% (1st)
25	May 17, 2014	21.8% (1st)	22.6% (1st)	20.7% (1st)	20.6% (1st)
26	May 18, 2014	24.7% (1st)	26.6% (1st)	26.3% (1st)	26.4% (1st)
27	May 24, 2014	23.1% (1st)	24.1% (1st)	22.0% (1st)	20.7% (1st)
28	May 25, 2014	27.1% (1st)	29.2% (1st)	27.5% (1st)	26.5% (1st)
29	May 31, 2014	22.8% (1st)	25.3% (1st)	23.0% (1st)	22.5% (1st)
30	June 1, 2014	26.2% (1st)	28.2% (1st)	26.7% (1st)	26.6% (1st)
31	June 6, 2014	23.0% (1st)	23.7% (1st)	21.7% (1st)	20.5% (1st)
32	June 8, 2014	24.6% (1st)	25.9% (1st)	24.8% (1st)	24.1% (1st)
33	June 14, 2014	21.1% (1st)	23.3% (1st)	21.4% (1st)	21.5% (1st)
34	June 15, 2014	23.8% (1st)	25.3% (1st)	25.7% (1st)	26.3% (1st)
35	June 21, 2014	20.3% (1st)	22.1% (1st)	22.2% (1st)	21.6% (1st)
36	June 22, 2014	22.6% (1st)	23.4% (1st)	24.0% (1st)	23.6% (1st)
37	June 28, 2014	22.0% (1st)	23.3% (1st)	23.1% (1st)	23.7% (1st)
38	June 29, 2014	26.4% (1st)	26.9% (1st)	25.1% (1st)	24.7% (1st)
39	July 5, 2014	23.0% (1st)	23.6% (1st)	22.8% (1st)	21.7% (1st)
40	July 6, 2014	24.3% (1st)	24.5% (1st)	26.2% (1st)	25.2% (1st)
41	July 12, 2014	23.1% (1st)	24.0% (1st)	23.1% (1st)	22.8% (1st)
42	July 13, 2014	27.5% (1st)	29.2% (1st)	26.5% (1st)	26.5% (1st)
43	July 19, 2014	24.1% (1st)	24.0% (1st)	23.2% (1st)	22.8% (1st)
44	July 20, 2014	25.7% (1st)	26.9% (1st)	26.4% (1st)	25.9% (1st)
45	July 26, 2014	21.9% (1st)	22.7% (1st)	21.4% (1st)	22.1% (1st)
46	July 27, 2014	24.8% (1st)	26.4% (1st)	25.6% (1st)	25.2% (1st)
47	August 2, 2014	22.6% (1st)	23.0% (2nd)	23.2% (1st)	20.9% (2nd)
48	August 3, 2014	26.3% (1st)	28.3% (2nd)	26.9% (1st)	26.3% (2nd)
49	August 9, 2014	23.7% (1st)	23.0% (2nd)	23.0% (2nd)	22.9% (2nd)
50	August 10, 2014	26.5% (2nd)	27.4% (2nd)	27.7% (2nd)	27.2% (2nd)

== Awards and nominations ==
Year	Award	Category	Recipient	Result	Ref.
2014	7th Korea Drama Awards	Best Young Actress	Hong Hwa-ri	Nominated	
2014	3rd APAN Star Awards	Top Excellence Award, Actor in a Serial Drama	Lee Seo-jin	Nominated	
2014	3rd APAN Star Awards	Top Excellence Award, Actress in a Serial Drama	Kim Hee-sun	Won	
2014	3rd APAN Star Awards	Excellence Award, Actor in a Serial Drama	Ok Taecyeon	Nominated	
2014	3rd APAN Star Awards	Best Supporting Actor	Ryu Seung-soo	Won	
2014	3rd APAN Star Awards	Best Supporting Actress	Kim Ji-ho	Nominated	
2014	3rd APAN Star Awards	Best Young Actor	Choi Kwon-soo	Won	
2014	KBS Drama Awards	Top Excellence Award, Actress	Kim Hee-sun	Nominated	
2014	KBS Drama Awards	Top Excellence Award, Actress	Youn Yuh-jung	Nominated	
2014	KBS Drama Awards	Excellence Award, Actor in a Serial Drama	Lee Seo-jin	Nominated	
2014	KBS Drama Awards	Excellence Award, Actor in a Serial Drama	Ok Taecyeon	Nominated	
2014	KBS Drama Awards	Excellence Award, Actress in a Serial Drama	Kim Hee-sun	Nominated	
2014	KBS Drama Awards	Excellence Award, Actress in a Serial Drama	Kim Ji-ho	Won	
2014	KBS Drama Awards	Best Supporting Actor	Ryu Seung-soo	Nominated	
2014	KBS Drama Awards	Best Supporting Actress	Jin Kyung	Nominated	
2014	KBS Drama Awards	Best New Actor	Park Bo-gum	Nominated	
2014	KBS Drama Awards	Best Young Actor	Choi Kwon-soo	Nominated	
2014	KBS Drama Awards	Best Young Actress	Hong Hwa-ri	Won	
2014	KBS Drama Awards	Best Young Actress	Joo Da-young	Nominated	

== International broadcast ==
Country	Network(s)/Station(s)	Series premiere	Title
(South Korea)	KBS2	February 22, 2014 – August 10, 2014 (KBS週末連續劇)	참 좋은 시절 ( ; lit: )
Hong Kong	Korean Drama (韓劇台)	September 24, 2014 – December 2, 2014 (Monday to Friday 13:30 – 14:45, 19:30 – 20:45 and 23:30 – 00:45)	( ; lit: )
(Taiwan)	EBC (東森戲劇台)	March 11, 2015 – April 27, 2015 (Monday to Friday 19:00 – 21:00, March 11 broadcast time is 20:00 – 21:00, April 27 broadcast time is 19:00 – 20:00)	( ; lit: )
(Singapore)	VV Drama (HUB娱家戏剧台)	September 8, 2015 – November 16, 2015 (Monday to Friday from 17:45 – 19:00)	( ; lit: )
Thailand	PPTV; Channel 9 MCOT HD	April 20, 2015; August 4, 2017-November 2, 2017 (5-28 October, no broadcast)	มหัศจรรย์แห่งรัก (Mahatsachan Haeng Rak; literally Miracle of Love ความทรงจำแห่งรัก (Kwamsongcham Haeng Rak; lit: Memory of Love)
