= Wanee & Junah =

2001 film

- Film poster
- Hangul: 와니와 준하
- RR: Waniwa Junha
- MR: Waniwa Chunha
- Directed by: Kim Yong-gyun
- Written by: Kim Yong-gyun
- Produced by: Kim Kwang-su
- Starring: Kim Hee-sun; Joo Jin-mo
- Cinematography: Hwang Ki-seok
- Edited by: Hahm Sung-won; Ki Sun-min
- Music by: Kim Hong-jib
- Release date: November 23, 2001
- Running time: 112 minutes
- Country: South Korea
- Language: Korean

Wanee & Junah (Korean: 와니와 준하) is a 2001 South Korean romantic drama film written and directed by Kim Yong-gyun.

== Plot ==
Wa-ni is a successful animator in her mid-20s who is rapidly losing any ambition and passion for life. She's just surviving because of her job and her boyfriend's presence, the easygoing Jun-ha. Jun-ha struggles to establish himself as a writer without sacrificing the art in his work in order to acquire his first film credit. The two are live-in lovers, however, their relationship becomes emotionally distant as memories of Wa-ni's past surface. When her old friend So-young comes to visit Wa-ni, Jun-ha finally learns what's behind his girlfriend's sorrow that prevents Wa-ni from fully connecting with him.

== Cast ==
- Kim Hee-sun as Wa-ni
- Joo Jin-mo as Jun-ha
- Cho Seung-woo as Young-min
- Choi Kang-hee as So-young
- Kim Soo-jin as Young-sook
- Go Jun

== Awards and nominations ==
| Award | Category | Recipient | Result |
|---|---|---|---|
| 21st Blue Dragon Film Awards | Best Actress | Kim Hee-sun | Nominated |
