= Sunlight Pours Down =

- Promotional poster
- Also known as: Sunshine of Love; Shining Days; Rays of Sunshine; Sunshine
- Genre: Romance; Drama
- Written by: Jung Jung-hwa
- Directed by: Kim Jong-hyuk
- Starring: Song Hye-kyo; Jo Hyun-jae; Ryoo Seung-bum
- Country of origin: South Korea
- Original language: Korean
- No. of episodes: 16

Production
- Producer: Gu Bon-geun
- Running time: 60 minutes
- Production company: Kim Jong-hak Production

Original release
- Network: Seoul Broadcasting System
- Release: February 11 – April 1, 2004

Sunlight Pours Down (Korean: 햇빛 쏟아지다; RR: Haetbit ssodajida) is a 2004 South Korean television series starring Song Hye-kyo, Jo Hyun-jae, and Ryoo Seung-bum. It aired on SBS from February 11 to April 1, 2004, on Wednesdays and Thursdays at 21:55 for 16 episodes. It received an average viewership rating of 11.9%, and a peak rating of 14.4%.

== Synopsis ==
Yeon-woo grew up happy in a loving family. After her father dies of mysterious causes, her mother remarries a man 10 years younger. Misfortunes never come singly. Her mother dies of Wilson's disease and her stepfather runs away with all their money. Min-ho, an old friend of hers, is always there to comfort her. Min-ho decides to be a policeman to catch the murderer who killed Yeon-woo's father. Eun-sup comes back to Korea with the sole purpose of stopping his lover Soo-ah from getting married, but Soo-ah gives him a flat-out rejection. To make matters worse, his father sends people over to his hotel to catch him. He runs away from the hotel and accidentally falls into the subway tracks and gets knocked unconscious. Yeon-woo leaps from the platform and saves his life. Eun-sup asks her if he could stay at her place temporarily since he has no place to go. So Yeon-woo, Min-ho and Eun-sup all started living together in a same house...

== Cast ==
=== Main characters ===
- Song Hye-kyo as Ji Yeon-woo
- Jo Hyun-jae as Jung Eun-sup
- Ryoo Seung-bum as Kim Min-ho
- Choi Yoo-jung as Lee Soo-ah

=== Supporting characters ===
- Song Jae-ho as Jung Seung-beom (Eun-sup's father)
- Kim Mi-kyung as Han Jung-do (Min-ho's mother)
- Kim Jung-hak as Jung Sang-gook
- Kang Shin-il as Detective Nam (Min-ho's boss)
- Oh Dae-gyu as Oh Dal-jae (Yeon-woo's stepfather)
- Lee Young-yoo as Oh Ye-kang
- Yeo Ho-min as loan shark
- Kim Byung-choon as police officer
- Park Hyo-joo as Seung-ok
- Kim So-yeon
- Choi Deok-moon
- Dokko Jun
- Kim Il-woo
