= Happy Sisters =

2017–2018 South Korean television series

- Promotional Poster
- Hangul: 해피 시스터즈
- RR: Haepi siseuteojeu
- MR: Haep'i sisŭt'ŏjŭ
- Genre: Family; Melodrama
- Created by: Hong Chang-uk
- Written by: Han Young-mi
- Starring: Shim Yi-young; Han Young; Oh Dae-gyu; Kang Seo-joon; Lee Shi-kang; Ban So-young
- Opening theme: Look at Me by BP Rania
- Country of origin: South Korea
- Original language: Korean
- No. of episodes: 120

Production
- Executive producer: Kim Yong-jin
- Camera setup: Single-camera
- Running time: 40 minutes
- Production company: SBS Plus

Original release
- Network: SBS TV
- Release: December 4, 2017 – May 25, 2018

Happy Sisters (Korean: 해피 시스터즈; RR: Haepi siseuteojeu) is a 2017 South Korean television series starring Shim Yi-young, Han Young, Oh Dae-gyu, Kang Seo-joon, Lee Shi-kang, and Ban So-young. The series airs daily on SBS from 8:30 a.m. to 9:10 a.m. (KST).

== Plot ==
A TV series depicting how women who live in our times are searching for their identity through beautiful and intense love.

== Cast ==
=== Main ===
- Shim Yi-young as Yoon Ye-eun
- Han Young as Yoon Sang-eun
- Oh Dae-gyu as Choi Jae-woong
- Kang Seo-joon as Lee Jin-seop
- Lee Shi-kang as Min Hyung-joo
- Ban So-young as Jo Hwa-young

=== Supporting ===
==== People around Lee Jin-seop ====
- Im Chae-moo as Lee Sung-pil
- Kim Seon-hwa as Jin Mal-shim
- Oh Young-shil as Yang Hye-jung
- Heo Eun-jung as Lee Se-ran
- Lee Ye-bin as Lee Byung-sook

==== People around Joo Man-bok ====
- Kim Dong-gyun as Joo Man-bok
- Bo Ra-na as Go Da-hong
- Lee Sang-mi as Kang Deok-ja
- Lee Sung-uk as Hwang Soo-chan
- Go Na-hee as Hwang Soo-ji

==== Others ====
- Kim Young-im as Na Seung-mi
- Sung Doo-seop as Cha Do-hoon
- Jung Geun as Gong Il-sam
- Kim Ha-rim as Noh Yoo-ra
- Lee Young-eun as Choi Jin-hee
- Seo Jung-woo as Cha bi-seo
- Min Joon-hyun
- Lee Seol-goo

== Original soundtrack ==
=== Part 1 ===
Released on November 27, 2017
No.	Title	Lyrics	Music	Artist	Length
1.	"Look At Me"	Han Young-mi, Peter Pan	Park Hyun-joong, Peter Pan, Kim Noh-eul	BP Rania	03:37
2.	"Look At Me" (Inst.)		Park Hyun-joong, Peter Pan, Kim Noh-eul		03:37
Total length:					07:14

=== Part 2 ===
Released on December 4, 2017
No.	Title	Lyrics	Music	Artist	Length
1.	"Look At You" (바라봅니다)	Bachelor Neighbour	Bachelor Neighbour	TaeOne	04:35
2.	"Look At You" (Inst.)		Bachelor Neighbour		04:35
Total length:					09:10

=== Part 3 ===
Released on December 11, 2017
No.	Title	Lyrics	Music	Artist	Length
1.	"One Two Three" (하나 둘 셋)	Bachelor Neighbour, Kim Jong-tae	Kim Jong-tae	Seungmin (Hash Tag)	03:20
2.	"One Two Three" (Inst.)		Kim Jong-tae		03:20
Total length:					06:40

== Ratings ==
- In this table, The blue numbers represent the lowest ratings and the red numbers represent the highest ratings.
- NR denotes that the drama did not rank in the top 20 daily programs on that date.
- N/A denotes that the rating is not known.

Ep.	Original broadcast date	Average audience share			
Ep.	Original broadcast date	TNmS		AGB Nielsen	
Ep.	Original broadcast date	Nationwide	Seoul	Nationwide	Seoul
1	December 4, 2017	9.8% (10th)	7.2% (17th)	8.8% (13th)	7.6% (18th)
2	December 5, 2017	9.4% (10th)	7.2% (11th)	8.7% (7th)	8.2% (9th)
3	December 6, 2017	9.4% (11th)	7.7% (11th)	8.2% (10th)	7.6% (9th)
4	December 7, 2017	9.2% (11th)	6.6% (19th)	8.3% (10th)	7.8% (13th)
5	December 8, 2017	9.3% (12th)	6.6% (17th)	8.5% (13th)	7.8% (13th)
6	December 11, 2017	9.6% (10th)	8.3% (12th)	9.0% (10th)	8.0% (17th)
7	December 12, 2017	10.4% (8th)	8.7% (8th)	9.1% (8th)	8.5% (9th)
8	December 13, 2017	9.4% (11th)	7.4% (13th)	8.7% (9th)	7.7% (13th)
9	December 14, 2017	10.1% (9th)	7.5% (12th)	8.6% (10th)	8.9% (13th)
10	December 15, 2017	9.8% (12th)	7.5% (15th)	8.9% (13th)	8.2% (14th)
11	December 18, 2017	10.6% (11th)	7.9% (15th)	9.0% (10th)	8.4% (12th)
12	December 19, 2017	10.3% (8th)	7.7% (11th)	9.2% (6th)	8.5% (7th)
13	December 20, 2017	9.6% (10th)	7.5% (11th)	9.4% (8th)	9.1% (8th)
14	December 21, 2017	10.4% (9th)	8.3% (9th)	9.3% (9th)	8.2% (9th)
15	December 22, 2017	9.5 (11th)	7.5 (13th)	9.8% (8th)	8.9% (9th)
16	December 25, 2017	8.4% (12th)	—N/a	7.8% (16th)	—N/a
17	December 26, 2017	11.1% (7th)	—N/a	9.2% (8th)	8.6% (7th)
18	December 27, 2017	11.2% (8th)	8.3% (11th)	9.0% (8th)	8.0% (10th)
19	December 28, 2017	10.5% (10th)	8.0% (10th)	10.6% (8th)	9.6% (7th)
20	December 29, 2017	10.0% (11th)	7.3% (15th)	9.8% (9th)	8.6% (11th)
21	January 1, 2018	8.0% (18th)	—N/a	7.4% (NR)	—N/a
22	January 2, 2018	10.7% (8th)	—N/a	9.2% (10th)	8.5% (7th)
23	January 3, 2018	10.1% (8th)	7.8% (12th)	9.7% (7th)	9.2% (5th)
24	January 4, 2018	10.9% (8th)	—N/a	9.8% (9th)	9.4% (8th)
25	January 5, 2018	11.0% (9th)	—N/a	10.2% (10th)	9.3% (10th)
26	January 8, 2018	11.0% (8th)	—N/a	10.1% (6th)	9.7% (8th)
27	January 9, 2018	11.0% (6th)	—N/a	10.0% (7th)	9.2% (7th)
28	January 10, 2018	10.7% (7th)	—N/a	9.9% (8th)	9.3% (8th)
29	January 11, 2018	12.0% (6th)	—N/a	10.3% (8th)	9.5% (8th)
30	January 12, 2018	11.7% (8th)	—N/a	10.4% (12th)	9.7% (11th)
31	January 15, 2018	12.5% (5th)	—N/a	10.0% (7th)	9.0% (10th)
32	January 16, 2018	11.2% (6th)	—N/a	10.1% (6th)	9.3% (6th)
33	January 17, 2018	11.6% (6th)	—N/a	10.0% (6th)	9.2% (5th)
34	January 18, 2018	11.7% (7th)	—N/a	10.9% (5th)	9.7% (5th)
35	January 19, 2018	12.2% (6th)	—N/a	10.2% (8th)	9.3% (10th)
36	January 22, 2018	11.4% (6th)	—N/a	10.2% (5th)	9.5% (8th)
37	January 23, 2018	12.1% (6th)	—N/a	11.5% (4th)	10.4% (5th)
38	January 24, 2018	13.1% (5th)	—N/a	11.1% (5th)	10.1% (7th)
39	January 25, 2018	13.1% (7th)	—N/a	10.6% (9th)	9.7% (8th)
40	January 26, 2018	12.8% (6th)	—N/a	11.7% (5th)	10.7% (8th)
41	January 29, 2018	13.2% (6th)	—N/a	10.7% (7th)	9.5% (8th)
42	January 30, 2018	12.8% (7th)	—N/a	11.4% (5th)	9.5% (7th)
43	January 31, 2018	13.7% (4th)	—N/a	11.7% (8th)	10.3% (8th)
44	February 1, 2018	13.8% (5th)	—N/a	12.3% (7th)	11.0% (8th)
45	February 2, 2018	13.6% (5th)	—N/a	11.3% (8th)	10.1% (10th)
46	February 5, 2018	14.5% (4th)	—N/a	11.7% (5th)	9.7% (8th)
47	February 6, 2018	13.5% (5th)	—N/a	11.9% (4th)	10.5% (5th)
48	February 7, 2018	14.1% (5th)	—N/a	12.0% (7th)	10.9% (8th)
49	February 8, 2018	9.7% (10th)	—N/a	8.3% (10th)	7.5% (9th)
50	February 12, 2018 (Note: No episode was aired on February 9 due to live coverage of the 2018 Winter Olympics.)	12.8% (3rd)	—N/a	11.3% (4th)	10.4% (7th)
51	February 13, 2018	12.9% (2nd)	—N/a	11.1% (5th)	9.8% (7th)
52	February 14, 2018	10.7% (6th)	—N/a	9.0% (10th)	8.1% (11th)
53	February 19, 2018 (Note: No episodes were aired on February 15 and 16 due to live coverage of the 2018 Winter Olympics.)	10.8% (5th)	—N/a	8.7% (14th)	7.7% (17th)
54	February 20, 2018	11.7% (7th)	—N/a	8.8% (13th)	8.1% (13th)
55	February 21, 2018	11.1% (7th)	—N/a	9.4% (7th)	8.1% (8th)
56	February 22, 2018	13.7% (4th)	—N/a	11.5% (6th)	9.8% (8th)
57	February 23, 2018	13.5% (2nd)	—N/a	11.1% (5th)	9.7% (6th)
58	February 26, 2018	12.7% (4th)	—N/a	10.5% (7th)	9.0% (11th)
59	February 27, 2018	13.2% (4th)	—N/a	11.2% (5th)	10.1% (7th)
60	February 28, 2018	13.2% (6th)	—N/a	10.3% (8th)	8.7% (9th)
61	March 1, 2018	13.7% (5th)	—N/a	11.1% (7th)	9.8% (7th)
62	March 2, 2018	14.0% (5th)	—N/a	11.1% (7th)	9.9% (8th)
63	March 5, 2018	14.2% (4th)	—N/a	11.6% (6th)	10.1% (8th)
64	March 6, 2018	13.7% (4th)	—N/a	11.1% (5th)	10.0% (6th)
65	March 7, 2018	13.1% (6th)	—N/a	10.0% (8th)	8.5% (7th)
66	March 8, 2018	13.8% (4th)	—N/a	10.8% (7th)	9.7% (9th)
67	March 9, 2018	13.8% (2nd)	—N/a	11.0% (5th)	9.4% (8th)
68	March 12, 2018	13.5% (4th)	—N/a	10.7% (4th)	8.9% (9th)
69	March 13, 2018	12.8% (5th)	—N/a	10.2% (6th)	9.2% (7th)
70	March 15, 2018 (Note: No episode was aired on March 14 due to a special news broadcast.)	13.4% (5th)	—N/a	10.8% (7th)	9.3% (9th)
71	March 16, 2018	13.9% (4th)	—N/a	11.8% (4th)	10.4% (7th)
72	March 19, 2018	14.0% (4th)	—N/a	10.8% (7th)	9.3% (8th)
73	March 20, 2018	13.7% (5th)	—N/a	10.7% (6th)	9.3% (7th)
74	March 21, 2018	14.3% (4th)	—N/a	11.2% (7th)	9.2% (8th)
75	March 22, 2018	13.9% (4th)	—N/a	11.2% (6th)	9.8% (7th)
76	March 23, 2018	15.0% (4th)	—N/a	11.8% (5th)	10.1% (8th)
77	March 26, 2018	13.6% (4th)	—N/a	10.7% (6th)	9.2% (9th)
78	March 27, 2018	14.0% (4th)	—N/a	11.5% (5th)	10.3% (7th)
79	March 28, 2018	13.9% (4th)	—N/a	11.2% (4th)	9.9% (4th)
80	March 29, 2018	14.0% (3rd)	—N/a	11.5% (4th)	10.3% (5th)
81	March 30, 2018	13.6% (4th)	—N/a	11.1% (6th)	9.8% (10th)
82	April 2, 2018	12.9% (4th)	—N/a	11.5% (5th)	10.5% (8th)
83	April 3, 2018	13.2% (4th)	—N/a	11.3% (4th)	10.3% (5th)
84	April 4, 2018	14.4% (4th)	—N/a	10.8% (4th)	9.8% (5th)
85	April 5, 2018	14.6% (3rd)	—N/a	11.8% (3rd)	11.0% (4th)
86	April 6, 2018	13.8% (3rd)	—N/a	12.1% (5th)	11.0% (8th)
87	April 9, 2018	13.1% (4th)	—N/a	11.1% (6th)	9.9% (9th)
88	April 10, 2018	13.3% (4th)	—N/a	11.4% (4th)	10.4% (6th)
89	April 11, 2018	13.5% (4th)	—N/a	11.3% (4th)	9.8% (5th)
90	April 12, 2018	13.7% (3rd)	—N/a	12.1% (4th)	10.7% (4th)
91	April 13, 2018	13.3% (5th)	—N/a	12.0% (5th)	10.9% (7th)
92	April 16, 2018	13.9% (4th)	—N/a	11.5% (5th)	9.6% (5th)
93	April 17, 2018	14.2% (4th)	—N/a	11.9% (4th)	10.6% (5th)
94	April 18, 2018	12.9% (4th)	—N/a	11.1% (4th)	9.7% (4th)
95	April 19, 2018	13.8% (4th)	—N/a	12.0% (4th)	10.8% (4th)
96	April 20, 2018	13.7% (4th)	—N/a	11.7% (5th)	10.2% (7th)
97	April 23, 2018	12.8% (5th)	—N/a	11.5% (7th)	10.2% (7th)
98	April 24, 2018	15.0% (4th)	—N/a	12.4% (4th)	10.1% (6th)
99	April 25, 2018	13.8% (4th)	—N/a	12.3% (4th)	11.1% (4th)
100	April 26, 2018	12.9% (3rd)	—N/a	11.3% (4th)	9.8% (5th)
101	April 30, 2018 (Note: No episode was aired on April 27 due to special news coverage of the Inter-Korean Summit.)	12.9% (4th)	—N/a	10.2% (6th)	8.4% (8th)
102	May 1, 2018	13.1% (4th)	—N/a	10.7% (6th)	9.4% (5th)
103	May 2, 2018	12.6% (3rd)	—N/a	11.8% (4th)	11.0% (5th)
104	May 3, 2018	13.9% (3rd)	—N/a	11.9% (4th)	10.9% (4th)
105	May 4, 2018	13.0% (4th)	—N/a	11.2% (4th)	9.9% (6th)
106	May 7, 2018	12.5% (4th)	—N/a	10.7% (6th)	10.0% (5th)
107	May 8, 2018	13.5% (4th)	—N/a	11.4% (5th)	10.1% (5th)
108	May 9, 2018	12.9% (4th)	—N/a	11.3% (4th)	10.1% (4th)
109	May 10, 2018	13.1% (3rd)	—N/a	11.3% (4th)	9.9% (4th)
110	May 11, 2018	13.0% (4th)	—N/a	11.5% (4th)	10.5% (6th)
111	May 14, 2018	13.8% (4th)	—N/a	11.2% (4th)	10.1% (6th)
112	May 15, 2018	12.1% (6th)	—N/a	11.0% (4th)	10.4% (5th)
113	May 16, 2018	13.6% (4th)	—N/a	10.7% (6th)	9.5% (5th)
114	May 17, 2018	14.0% (3rd)	—N/a	11.6% (5th)	11.1% (5th)
115	May 18, 2018	14.4% (3rd)	—N/a	11.6% (5th)	10.9% (6th)
116	May 21, 2018	13.8% (4th)	—N/a	10.9% (5th)	9.9% (6th)
117	May 22, 2018	10.0% (5th)	—N/a	9.8% (6th)	8.8% (6th)
118	May 23, 2018	14.4% (3rd)	—N/a	11.4% (5th)	10.2% (5th)
119	May 24, 2018	14.0% (4th)	—N/a	12.0% (4th)	10.9% (4th)
120	May 25, 2018	13.0% (4th)	—N/a	11.2% (5th)	9.7% (7th)
Average		12.5%	-	10.6%	9.6%

== Awards and nominations ==
Year	Award	Category	Recipient	Result	Ref.
2018	11th Korea Drama Awards	Best New Actor	Lee Shi-kang	Nominated	
2018	SBS Drama Awards	Top Excellence Award, Actor in a Daily and Weekend Drama	Oh Dae-gyu	Nominated	
2018	SBS Drama Awards	Excellence Award, Actress in a Daily and Weekend Drama	Shim Yi-young	Nominated	
