= Love, In Between =

- Film poster
- Hangul: 두여자
- Hanja: 두女子
- RR: Duyeoja
- MR: Tuyŏja
- Directed by: Jeong Yoon-soo
- Written by: Shin Yang-joong; Jeong Yoon-soo
- Based on: Black Ice by Petri Kotwica
- Produced by: Shin Yang-joong; Kang Kyung-il; Park Ji-myung
- Starring: Shin Eun-kyung; Jung Joon-ho; Shim Yi-young
- Cinematography: Jin Yong-hwan
- Edited by: Kim Hyeong-ju
- Music by: Park Ji-woong
- Distributed by: CJ Entertainment
- Release date: November 18, 2010 (South Korea)
- Running time: 105 minutes
- Country: South Korea
- Language: Korean
- Box office: US$836,481

Love, In Between (Korean: 두여자; RR: Duyeoja; lit. 'Two women') is a 2010 South Korean film based on the Finnish film Black Ice (2007).

== Plot ==
Love, In Between centers around a woman who discovers that her husband is having an affair. Prior to this, the couple were nearly perfect and the movie reflects the choices one might make in such a situation.

University professor Yun Ji-seok (Jung Joon-ho) loves his wife So-young (Shin Eun-kyung) who works as an obstetrician, but he cannot give up his new love, a student named Su-ji (Shim Yi-young) he is having an affair with.

After So-young discovers her husband's affair with a student named Su-ji, So-young embarks an elaborate plot to befriend the woman. When So-young meets Su-ji, she experiences varying emotions from wanting revenge to sympathy.

== Cast ==
- Shin Eun-kyung as Han So-young
- Jung Joon-ho as Yun Ji-seok
- Shim Yi-young as Su-ji
- Choi Jae-won as Yeong-ho
- Lee Seon-jin as Min-seo
- Kwon Sung-min as Jae-hee

== Release ==
The film was released in South Korean cinemas on November 18, 2010. It opened at #8 in the box office selling, 59,424 tickets. In total the film grossed US$836,481 in South Korea with 129,323 admissions sold nationwide.
