= Island Trio =

South Korean reality show

- Also known as: Island Musketeers
- Hangul: 섬총사
- Hanja: 섬銃士
- RR: Seomchongsa
- MR: Sŏmch'ongsa
- Genre: Reality show Travel documentary
- Directed by: Park Sang-hyuk
- Starring: Season 1: Kang Ho-dong; Kim Hee-sun; Jung Yong-hwa Season 2: Kang Ho-dong; Lee Soo-geun; Lee Yeon-hee
- Country of origin: South Korea
- Original language: Korean
- No. of seasons: 2
- No. of episodes: 43

Production
- Production locations: Uido Island, Sinan County, South Jeolla

Original release
- Network: O'live tvN
- Release: May 22, 2017 – September 10, 2018

Island Trio (Korean: 섬총사; RR: Seomchongsa) is a South Korean travel-reality show broadcast on O'live and cable TV, tvN. A comedian, an actress and a singer combined into a trio visiting different islands and stay with local islanders to experience the lifestyle as islanders. This show premiered on May 22, 2017, at 9.30pm KST and airs every Monday, which later on changed the time-slot to 10:50pm KST.

In Season 2 of the show, with Kang Ho-dong to remain while Lee Soo-geun and Lee Yeon-hee join the cast lineup, replacing Kim Hee-sun and Jung Yong-hwa. It premiered on 25 June 2018 at 11pm KST.

== Airtime ==
Air date	Airtime	Season
May 22, 2017 – October 2, 2017	Monday at 9:30 PM KST	1
October 9, 2017 – December 18, 2017	Monday at 10:50 PM KST	1
June 23, 2018 – September 10, 2018	Monday at 11:00 PM KST	2

== Cast ==
- Kang Ho-dong (Season 1–2)
- Lee Soo-geun (Season 2)
- Lee Yeon-hee (Season 2)

=== Former ===
- Kim Hee-sun (Season 1)
- Jung Yong-hwa (Season 1)

== Episode ==
=== Season 1 (2017) ===
Trip	Ep.	Broadcast Date	Place Visited	Guest	Notes
1	1	May 22	Oido	—N/a	
1	2	May 29	Oido	Tae Hang-ho	
1	3	June 5	Oido	Tae Hang-ho	
1	4	June 12	Oido	Tae Hang-ho	
1	5	June 19	Oido	Tae Hang-ho; Kim Jong-min	
1	6	June 26	Oido	Tae Hang-ho; Kim Jong-min	
2	7	July 3	Yeongsando (Note: Transited in Heuksando for a brief moment before heading to Yeongsando)	—N/a	
2	8	July 10	Yeongsando	Kim Roi-ha	
2	9	July 17	Yeongsando	Kim Roi-ha	
2	10	July 24	Yeongsando	Kim Roi-ha	
2	11	July 31	Yeongsando	Kim Roi-ha; Lee Kyu-han	
2	12	August 7	Yeongsando	Kim Roi-ha; Lee Kyu-han	
3	13	August 14	Saengildo	John Park	Jung Yonghwa's absent to attend CNBLUE concert overseas
3	14	August 21	Saengildo	John Park; Go Soo-hee	
3	15	August 28	Saengildo	John Park; Go Soo-hee	
3	16	September 4	Saengildo	John Park; Go Soo-hee	
3	17	September 11	Saengildo	John Park; Go Soo-hee	Jung Yonghwa joins in after his concert tour
3	18	September 18	Saengildo	John Park; Go Soo-hee	Seomchongsa vs. Saengl-do Badminton Club
4	19	September 25	Hongdo	Gummy	
4	20	October 2	Hongdo	Gummy	
4	21	October 9	Hongdo	Gummy; Kang Ji-hwan	
4	22	October 16	Hongdo	Gummy; Kang Ji-hwan	
4	23	October 23	Hongdo	Gummy; Kang Ji-hwan; Kim Sung-kyu	
4	24	October 30	Hongdo	Gummy; Kang Ji-hwan; Kim Sung-kyu	
5	25	November 6	Eocheongdo (Gunsan)	—N/a	
5	26	November 13	Eocheongdo (Gunsan)	Oh Kwang-rok	
5	27	November 20	Eocheongdo (Gunsan)	Oh Kwang-rok; Jung Sang-hoon	
5	28	November 27	Eocheongdo (Gunsan)	Oh Kwang-rok; Jung Sang-hoon	
5	29	December 4	Eocheongdo (Gunsan)	Oh Kwang-rok; Jung Sang-hoon; Jo Se-ho	
5	30	December 11	Eocheongdo (Gunsan)	Oh Kwang-rok; Jung Sang-hoon; Jo Se-ho	
5	31	December 18	Eocheongdo (Gunsan)	Oh Kwang-rok; Jung Sang-hoon; Jo Se-ho	Final episode of season 1

=== Season 2 (2018) ===
Trip	Ep.	Broadcast Date	Place Visited	Guest	Notes
1	1	June 25, 2018	Yeondo (Yeosu)	—N/a	
1	2	July 2, 2018	Yeondo (Yeosu)	Wi Ha-joon	
1	3	July 9, 2018	Yeondo (Yeosu)	Wi Ha-joon	
1	4	July 16, 2018	Yeondo (Yeosu)	Wi Ha-joon	
1	5	July 23, 2018	Yeondo (Yeosu)	Wi Ha-joon; Moon Se-yoon	
1	6	July 30, 2018	Yeondo (Yeosu)	Wi Ha-joon; Moon Se-yoon	
2	7	August 6, 2018	Chodo (Yeosu)	Wi Ha-joon	

== Ratings ==
- In the ratings below, the highest rating for the show will be in red, and the lowest rating for the show will be in blue.
- This show is aired on both Olive TV and tvN, however, the ratings shown above are only based on tvN's rating and not inclusive Olive TV's broadcast.
- TNmS have stopped publishing their rating report from June 2018.

=== Season 1 ===
List of Episodes (episode 1–31)

2017		Average audience share		
Episode #	Broadcast Date			
Episode #	Broadcast Date	TNmS	AGB Nielsen	
Episode #	Broadcast Date	Nationwide	Nationwide	Seoul
1	May 22	—N/a	1.755%	1.905%
2	May 29	—N/a	2.222%	2.444%
3	June 5	—N/a	1.791%	1.544%
4	June 12	—N/a	1.735%	1.481%
5	June 19	—N/a	1.868%	1.407%
6	June 26	1.7%	1.870%	1.727%
7	July 3	2.3%	2.467%	2.252%
8	July 10	2.0%	2.065%	2.118%
9	July 17	2.5%	2.315%	2.481%
10	July 24	2.5%	2.349%	2.635%
11	July 31	2.8%	2.676%	2.558%
12	August 7	2.1%	2.680%	2.923%
13	August 14	2.4%	2.876%	3.044%
14	August 21	2.7%	3.028%	3.077%
15	August 28	2.6%	2.824%	2.491%
16	September 4	2.8%	2.982%	3.140%
17	September 11	1.8%	2.509%	2.126%
18	September 18	2.5%	2.480%	2.668%
19	September 25	2.8%	3.659%	3.800%
20	October 2	3.1%	3.592%	3.455%
21	October 9	1.7%	2.188%	2.282%
22	October 16	2.2%	2.085%	2.111%
23	October 23	2.4%	2.050%	1.813%
24	October 30	1.9%	1.769%	1.681%
25	November 6	2.4%	1.862%	1.756%
26	November 13	2.8%	1.565%	1.365%
27	November 20	1.8%	2.128%	2.047%
28	November 27	2.2%	1.798%	1.615%
29	December 4	2.2%	2.242%	2.200%
30	December 11	2.1%	2.009%	2.114%
31	December 18	1.7%	2.000%	1.809%

=== Season 2 ===
List of Episodes (episode 1–present)

2018		Average audience share	
Episode #	Broadcast Date		
Episode #	Broadcast Date	AGB Nielsen	
Episode #	Broadcast Date	Nationwide	Seoul
1	June 25	1.983%	2.217%
2	July 2	1.280%	—N/a
3	July 9	1.476%	1.333%
4	July 16	1.791%	1.853%
5	July 23	1.375%	—N/a
6	July 30	1.529%	1.660%
7	August 6	1.558%	1.678%
8	August 13	1.609%	1.320%
9	August 20	1.310%	1.429%
10	August 27	1.1%	—N/a
11	September 3	1.549%	1.573%
12	September 10	1.275%	1.189%
