= Jung Yoo-jung =

South Korean murderer

- Born: 1999 (age 26–27); Busan, South Korea
- Status: Incarcerated
- Convictions: Murder; Abandonment of a corpse
- Penalty: Life imprisonment

Details
- Victims: 1
- Date: 26 May 2023
- Country: South Korea
- State: Yeongnam
- Imprisoned at: Busan Detention Center

Jung Yoo-jung (Korean: 정유정; born 1999) is a South Korean murderer. In May 2023, disguised as a secondary student seeking for English tutoring, she killed the tutor at her home in Busan. Investigation revealed that Jung had been engrossed in true crime media, claiming her act as "out of curiosity."

After dismembering the body, Jung carried the body remains in a suitcase and dumped them in an isolated forest by the banks of Nakdong River. The driver of a taxi which she took, tipped off the police as he became suspicious of his passenger's bloodstained suitcase. In November 2023, the Busan District Court sentenced Jung to life imprisonment. Prosecutors wanted a death penalty and she was retried by the Supreme Court in May 2024, which upheld the conviction of life sentence.

== Background ==
Jung lived with her grandfather in Busan. Her mother deserted her when she was one year old, and then by her father when she was six. She completed her secondary education in 2018 and since then remained unemployed, and had applied for university entrance several times but without success. At the time of the murder, she was preparing for competitive examinations for civil services.

With plenty of free time, Jung developed a hobby of watching crime shows and reading murder stories. She had learned from internet sources on how to conceal and dispose of bodies. Wanting to act out a real-life scenario, she started to make plans for killing. As the Busan police later revealed, she had well-researched on the modus operandi, one of which was learning from books she borrowed from a local library. The library record showed Jung borrowing many books on crimes in the past months. Targeting more vulnerable female home tutors, she joined a tutoring app pretending to be a parent. By May 2023, she had approached 54 tutors posing as a mother of a 9th-grade student who needed English tuition. Then, in late May 2023, she found a willing tutor, a 26-year-old freelance worker and a university student, who was living in the south-eastern area of Busan.

== Murder ==
Jung contacted the female tutor, who agreed to a home lesson with her fictitious daughter. She had bought a school uniform from an online seller. She then disguised herself as a schoolgirl and went to the tutor's residence on 26 May 2023. Being of short stature, the tutor easily took her as a student and willingly let her into the house. She stabbed the tutor with a well-prepared weapon [not specified] over 110 times.

Footage on a security camera showed that after the kill, she first went back to her home to bring a black trolley suitcase. She then went to a nearby store to buy a garbage bag and bleach. Returning to the victim's home, she dismembered the body and packed the remains into the suitcase. She severed the victim's fingers to make biometric identification difficult and also kept the victim's mobile phone, ID card and wallet. The plan was to make a scene of traceless disappearance – "a perfect crime", as the police reported. When she left the victim's house, she had removed the bloodstained school uniform and got changed in the victim's clothes. She took a taxi and dumped the suitcase with its contents in a secluded forest near Nakdong River in Yangsan, South Gyeongsang Province.

=== Arrest and conviction ===
Suspicious of Jung's behavior and actions, particularly noticing Jung's blood-soaked suitcase, the taxi driver informed the police, who immediately made an investigation. The police located the abandoned suitcase and found the body remains therein. On 27 May, the police arrested Jung and found the bloodstained clothes and body parts in her house. Jung showed no remorse or attempt to deny her involvement in the murder. However, she initially said that she took the body only when she found the victim had been killed by someone else; but soon changed her story to that she had "accidentally killed the victim in an argument." As the police found several irregularities in her accounts, her family urged her to tell the truth, after which she made a full confession. On 2 June, she made a public apology that she was out of her mind and declared that she was "really sorry for the victim's family."

The Busan District Court held the first trial of Jung on 14 July 2023. In the court, her motive was described as rooted on "a feeling of resentment and anger toward her family, helplessness due to continued failures such as college entrance and employment." She pleaded for a mild sentence, claiming that hallucinations and a host of mental health issues compelled her to kill. Phone call record played in the court indicated that Jung had given death threats to her father a few days before the murder. Internet browsing history also revealed that she had searched for methods to kill and dispose of bodies. Police also found that a day before the murder, i.e. 25 May, she invited a young woman for a walk near Nakdong River, but the sidewalk they took was full of passers-by; hence, no chance of a murder. Jung had also tried to lure earlier a teenage boy at the same location, but the boy got suspicious over the online chat and refused to meet her.

On 24 November 2023, the court issued a verdict of guilty of homicide, desecration and abandonment of a corpse. The presiding judge, Kim Tae-eob, ruled that Jung had no mental illness that prompted the murder as she claimed, and that her act was a carefully planned and executed ordeal. While the prosecution expected a death penalty, she was given a life sentence. Her apologies and lawyers' plea for a reduced sentence were denied, and the court decided that the crime was a deliberate and premeditated act. She was further sentenced to wear a location tracking device for 30 years, and will be eligible for parole after 20 years.

The prosecution appealed for harder sentence to the Supreme Court on 28 November, while Jung applied for reduced sentence on 30 November. South Korea has capital punishment of death penalty, but has not been in actual effect since 1997. The prosecution moved the petition to the Busan High Court. In March, the court ruled that the death penalty "should be executed only in very limited and exceptional cases," rejecting the petition. The prosecution then moved the petition to the Supreme Court, which reopened the case in May 2024. On 13 June 2024, the Supreme Court announced its decision that Jung's life sentence was justified. According to the court, the judgment was based on circumstantial factors such as the offender's age, behaviour, background and motive for the murder.

=== Impact ===
Jung's action was said to "spread fear in society that anyone can become a victim for no reason." It also led to distrust of others in a community. According to Lee Soo-jung, a forensic psychology professor at Kyonggi University, Jung's conduct was most unusual as most murderers would be terrified, and Jung showed no sign of panic or tension. Lee further suggested that the main motive could be that Jung wanted to steal the victim's identity in light of her taking the ID card and wallet, based on her failure to get university enrollments.
