= Bongja =

- Theatrical poster
- Hangul: 봉자
- RR: Bongja
- MR: Pongja
- Directed by: Park Chul-soo
- Written by: Kim Jeon-han
- Produced by: Ha Gwang-hwi
- Starring: Seo Kap-sook; Shim Yi-young
- Cinematography: Cho Dong-kwan
- Edited by: Kim Yang-il; Han Seung-ryong
- Music by: Lee Tzsche
- Production company: Next Films
- Release date: November 21, 2000
- Running time: 92 minutes
- Country: South Korea
- Language: Korean

Bongja (Korean: 봉자) is a 2000 South Korean film.

== Plot ==
A seaweed roll maker named Ok Bong-ja finds a teenaged runaway-turned prostitute lying down on the road and takes her to her home, where their friendship turns into mutual attraction.

== Cast ==
- Seo Kap-sook ... Ok Bong-ja
- Shim Yi-young
- Kim Il-woo
- Choi Dae-woong
- Min Kyoung-jin
- Kim Ju-hong
- Lee Yong-yi
- Seon Uk-hyeon
- Park Jae-hyeon
