= Kim Hee-sun =

South Korean actress (born 1977)

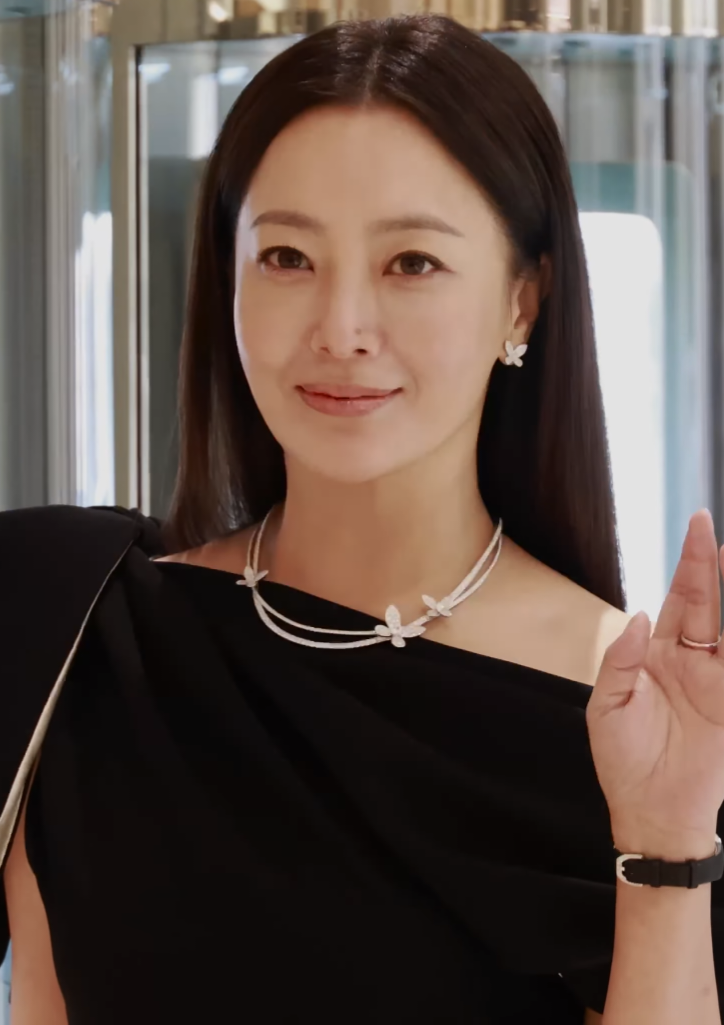
- Kim in October 2025
- Born: June 11, 1977 (age 49); Cheonho-dong, Gangdong District, Seoul, South Korea (Note: According to Park Bok-sun (Kim Hee-sun's mother), she confirmed that Cheonho-dong is Hee-sun's birthplace and Hee-sun herself confirmed it years later in an interview promoting Wonderful Days that Daegu is actually her parents' hometown and not hers.)
- Other name: Kim Hee-seon
- Education: Chung-Ang University
- Occupations: Actress; television host
- Years active: 1992–present
- Agent: Hinge Entertainment
- Spouse: Park Ju-young (m. 2007)
- Children: 1

Korean name
- Hangul: 김희선
- Hanja: 金喜善
- RR: Gim Huiseon
- MR: Kim Hŭisŏn

Kim Hee-sun (Korean: 김희선; born June 11, 1977) is a South Korean actress. She rose to fame in the 1990s with leading roles in television series such as Men of the Bath House (1995), Propose (1997), Wedding Dress (1997), Forever Yours (1998), Mister Q (1998), Sunflower (1998), and Tomato (1999). Kim also starred in the martial arts films Bichunmoo (2000) and The Myth (2005), historical medical series Faith (2012), teen series Angry Mom (2015), melodrama The Lady in Dignity (2017), and fantasy series Tomorrow (2022).

== Career ==
Kim Hee-sun won the Fair Face Beauty Contest in 1992 while in middle school and began modeling in teen magazines. In 1993, Kim, then a high school sophomore, appeared in a commercial for Lotte Samkang's crab chips, which led to her acting debut in Dinosaur Teacher; and an MC gig for music show Live TV Music 20 that same year.

She enjoyed peak popularity in the mid-to-late 1990s, starring in one hit Korean drama after another. These include Men of the Bath House (1995) written by Kim Soo-hyun, Propose (1997), Wedding Dress (1997) with Lee Seung-yeon, Forever Yours (1998) with Ryu Si-won, Mister Q (1998) with Kim Min-jong and Song Yun-ah, Sunflower (1998) with Ahn Jae-wook, and Tomato (1999) with Kim Suk-hoon. Kim won the top prize at the 1998 SBS Drama Awards for Mister Q, making her at the time the youngest-ever Grand Prize (Daesang) winner, at age 21. During this period, she also appeared in numerous advertisements and rose to fame both at home and abroad as one of Korea's most beautiful and trend-setting actresses.

Unlike her success in television, the silver screen proved to be a bigger challenge for Kim's career. She made her film debut in 1997's Repechage opposite Jang Dong-gun, and the film's director Lee Kwang-hoon subsequently put her in his next film, Ghost in Love (1999). In her most high-profile role to date, Kim played the daughter of a Mongolian general in the big-budget martial arts fantasy Bichunmoo, shot in China and released in summer 2000. Although criticized for her acting in the film, it gave her more domestic and international exposure than any of her other films. Along with her popular TV dramas, it cemented her position as a Korean Wave star in mainland China, Hong Kong, Taiwan and throughout Southeast Asia.

In late 2001, Kim took on a completely different kind of role, cutting her hair short and starring as an animator in Wanee & Junah. Although her acting in this film drew a favorable response from critics, the film itself was a commercial flop. Her career took a downturn in 2003, when the environmentally-themed melodrama A Man Who Went to Mars, also known as A Letter From Mars, costarring Shin Ha-kyun became an utter bomb at the box office. She returned to television, however My Fair Lady (2003) which was adapted from the Japanese television drama Yamato Nadeshiko, and Sad Love Story (2005) where she played a blind singer, both received low ratings.

Due to her popularity among Chinese viewers, Kim was then cast opposite Jackie Chan in The Myth, for which she learned to speak Mandarin. Back in Korea, her career slump continued with Smile Again in 2006.

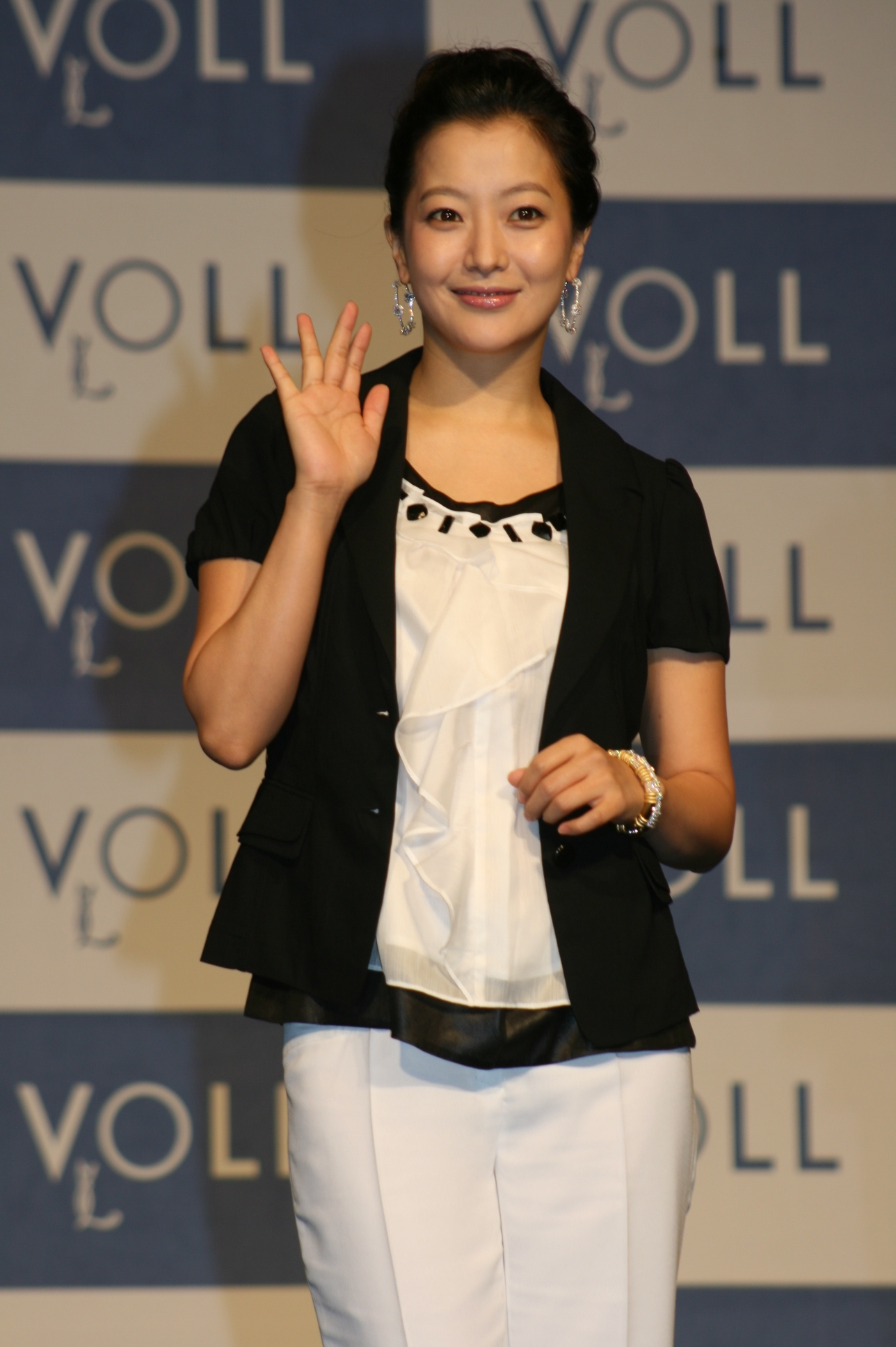
Kim in 2009

Kim married in 2007, and she left the entertainment scene to devote her time to being a wife and mother. During this five-year hiatus from acting, apart from appearing in magazines, Kim published a book in 2009 on childcare and how to lose post-pregnancy weight, titled Kim Hee-sun's Happy Mom Project.

Though she had a minor role in the Chinese epic The Warring States (2011), Kim officially made her comeback in 2012 as a modern-day doctor who time-travels to Goryeo in the period romance Faith, the last collaboration by screenwriter Song Ji-na and television director Kim Jong-hak.

In 2013, Kim became one of the hosts of the revamped second season of variety talk show Strong Heart, titled Hwasin – Controller of the Heart. After Hwasin was cancelled, she was cast in the Lee Kyung-hee-penned weekend family drama Wonderful Days (2014). This was followed by Angry Mom in 2015, where Kim's portrayal of the titular character who returns to high school when she learns that her teenage daughter is being bullied was highly praised by critics. Kim then began filming for Chinese fantasy television drama Ice Fantasy, which started airing in July 2016.

In 2017, Kim starred in the television series, The Lady in Dignity alongside Kim Sun-ah. The series achieved a rating of 12.6% for its finale, becoming JTBC's highest rated drama at the time. Kim's performance was well received by critics and audience.

In 2018, Kim starred in tvN's mystery drama Room No. 9. The same year she confirmed her return to the big screen with independent film Paper Flower. In 2020, Kim starred in the science fiction romance drama Alice which was broadcast on SBS in 2020 and released worldwide on Netflix in 2021.

In 2022, Kim starred in the MBC fantasy drama Tomorrow, playing the role of grim reaper Goo-ryeon.

== Personal life ==
=== Marriage and family ===
Kim wed businessman Park Ju-young in a lavish ceremony at the Seoul Sheraton Grande Walkerhill Hotel on October 19, 2007. She gave birth to daughter Park Yeon-ah on January 21, 2009.

=== Philanthropy ===
On March 9, 2022, Kim donated ₩100 million to the Korean Red Cross to help the victims of the massive forest fire that started in Uljin County, North Gyeongsang Province, and spread to Samcheok, Gangwon Province. On April 25, 2022, Kim donated ₩100 million to Asan Medical Center to pay for the treatments of low-income patients.

== Discography ==
=== Singles ===
Title	Year	Album
"Endless Love" (無盡的愛) (Kim Hee-sun with Jackie Chan)	2005	The Myth OST
"No Matter How Many Times We Part" (몇번을 헤어져도) (Kim Hee-sun with Yoon Gun)	2005	Sad Love Story OST
"Love Is" (사랑이란) (Mighty Mouth ft. Kim Hee-sun)	2011	Mighty Fresh

== Filmography ==
=== Film ===
Year	Title	Role	Notes	Ref.
1997	Repechage	Eun-hye		
1999	Ghost in Love	Jin Chae-byul		
1999	Calla	Kang Ji-hee		
2000	Bichunmoo	Sullie		
2001	Wanee & Junah	Wa-ni		
2003	A Man Who Went to Mars	So-hee		
2005	The Myth	Princess Ok-soo	Hong Kong-Chinese film	
2011	The Warring States	Pang Wan	Chinese film	
2023	Honey Sweet	Il-yeong		
2024	A Legend	Mysterious Woman	Chinese film	
TBA	New Police Story 2		Chinese film	

=== Television series ===
Year	Title	Role	Notes	Ref.
1993	Dinosaur Teacher	Kim Hee-sun		
1994	The Story of Chunhyang	Seong Chunhyang		
1995	Agatha Christie	Lee Joon-hee		
1995	Sons of the Wind	Lee Yeon-hwa		
1995	Men of the Bath House	Kim Soo-kyung		
1996	Colors "White Side"	Kim Hye-jin / Song Eun-young		
1996	A Faraway Country	Seo Woon-ha		
1997	Propose	Kim Yoo-ra		
1997	New York Story	Jae-in		
1997	Wedding Dress	Kim Doo-na		
1998	Forever Yours	Han Seo-hee		
1998	Mister Q	Han Hye-won		
1998	Sunflower	Han Soo-yeon		
1999	Tomato	Lee Han-yi		
1999	Goodbye My Love	Seo Yeon-joo		
2003	My Fair Lady	Ha Min-kyung		
2005	Sad Love Story	Park Hye-in		
2006	Smile Again	Oh Dan-hee		
2007	Tai Chi Chasers	Phoebe	Voiced in the Korean version	
2012	Faith	Yoo Eun-soo		
2014	Wonderful Days	Cha Hae-won		
2015	Angry Mom	Jo Kang-ja / Jo Bang-wool		
2016	Ice Fantasy	Lian Ji	Chinese drama	
2017	The Lady in Dignity	Woo Ah-jin		
2018	Room No. 9	Eulji Hae-yi		
2020	Alice	Yoon Tae-yi / Park Sun-young		
2022	Tomorrow	Goo-ryeon		
2022	Remarriage & Desires	Seo Hye-seung		
2024	Bitter Sweet Hell	Noh Young-won		
2025	Don't Call Me Ma'am	Jo Na-jeong		

=== Television shows ===
Year	Title	Role	Notes	Ref.
1993	Live TV Music 20	Host		
1995	TV Time Travel	Host		
1996–1998	Live TV Music 20	Host		
1999	There Is Something Special with Kim Hee-sun	Host		
2001	A Very Special Gift with Kim Hee-sun	Host		
2009	Human Documentary Love: I Want to Be Thumbelina's Mom III	Narrator	Documentary	
2013	Hwasin: Controller of the Heart	Host		
2017	My Little Old Boys	Special Host	episodes 48–50	
2017	Island Trio	Cast member		
2018	Talkmon	Host		
2021	Honeymoon Tavern	Cast Member	Episode 1–9	
2024	Watcha Up To?	Cast Member	Episode 1–	

== Bibliography ==
Year	Title	Publisher	ISBN
2009	Kim Hee-sun's Happy Mom Project	L Company	ISBN 9788996837268

== Accolades ==
=== Awards and nominations ===
Name of the award ceremony, year presented, category, nominee of the award, and the result of the nomination
Award ceremony	Year	Category	Nominee / Work	Result	Ref.
Andre Kim Best Star Awards	2003	Star Award	Kim Hee-sun	Won	
Andre Kim Best Star Awards	2007	Star Award	Kim Hee-sun	Won	
Andre Kim Best Star Awards	2009	Star Award	Kim Hee-sun	Won	
APAN Star Awards	2014	Top Excellence Award, Actress in a Serial Drama	Wonderful Days	Won	
APAN Star Awards	2015	Top Excellence Award, Actress in a Miniseries	Angry Mom	Won	
APAN Star Awards	2016	Best APAN Star Award	Kim Hee-sun	Won	
APAN Star Awards	2021	Top Excellence Award, Best Actress in a Miniseries	Alice	Won	
Asia Artist Awards	2017	Grand Prize (Daesang)	The Lady in Dignity	Won	
Asian Influence Awards Oriental Ceremony	2015	Most Influential Asian Award	Kim Hee-sun	Won	
Baeksang Arts Awards	1996	Best New Actress – Television	Men of the Bath House	Won	
Baeksang Arts Awards	2000	Most Popular Actress (TV)	Tomato	Won	
Baeksang Arts Awards	2002	Best Actress – Film	Wanee & Junah	Nominated	
Baeksang Arts Awards	2002	Most Popular Actress (Film)	Wanee & Junah	Won	
Baeksang Arts Awards	2018	Best Actress – Television	The Lady in Dignity	Nominated	
Blue Dragon Film Awards	2000	Popular Star Award	Bichunmoo	Won	
Blue Dragon Film Awards	2001	Best Leading Actress	Wanee & Junah	Nominated	
Blue Dragon Film Awards	2001	Popular Star Award	Wanee & Junah	Won	
Chunsa Film Art Awards	2023	Best Actress	Honey Sweet	Nominated	
Cosmo Beauty Awards	2012	Beauty Icon of the Year	Kim Hee-sun	Won	
Fair Face Beauty Contest	1992	Grand Prize (Daesang)	Kim Hee-sun	Won	
Grand Bell Awards	2001	Best Actress	Bichunmoo	Nominated	
Hong Kong Film Awards	2006	Best Original Film Song	The Myth	Nominated	
KBS Drama Awards	1994	Best Young Actress	The Story of Chunhyang	Nominated	
KBS Drama Awards	1995	Best New Actress	Sons of the Wind	Won	
KBS Drama Awards	1996	Excellence Award, Actress	A Faraway Country, Colors	Won	
KBS Drama Awards	1997	Popularity Award	Propose	Won	
KBS Drama Awards	2014	Top Excellence Award, Actress	Wonderful Days	Nominated	
KBS Drama Awards	2014	Excellence Award, Actress in a Serial Drama	Wonderful Days	Nominated	
Korean Culture and Entertainment Awards	2012	Best Actress	Faith	Won	
Korea Drama Awards	2015	Top Excellence Award, Actress	Angry Mom	Nominated	
MBC Drama Awards	1998	Popularity Award	Forever Yours, Sunflower	Won	
MBC Drama Awards	2015	Grand Prize (Daesang)	Angry Mom	Nominated	
MBC Drama Awards	2015	Top 10 Stars	Angry Mom	Won	
MBC Drama Awards	2015	Top Excellence Award, Actress in a Miniseries	Angry Mom	Nominated	
MBC Drama Awards	2022	Top Excellence Award, Actress in a Miniseries	Tomorrow	Nominated	
MBC Drama Awards	2024	Top Excellence Award, Actress in a Miniseries	Bitter Sweet Hell	Nominated	
MBC Drama Awards	2024	Grand Prize (Daesang)	Bitter Sweet Hell	Nominated	
MBC Drama Awards	2024	Best Couple Award (with Lee Hye-young)	Bitter Sweet Hell	Nominated	
SBS Drama Awards	1998	Grand Prize (Daesang)	Mister Q	Won	
SBS Drama Awards	2000	SBSi Award	Tomato	Won	
SBS Drama Awards	2000	Big Star Award	Tomato	Won	
SBS Drama Awards	2012	Top Excellence Award, Actress in a Miniseries	Faith	Nominated	
SBS Drama Awards	2020	Grand Prize (Daesang)	Alice	Nominated	
SBS Drama Awards	2020	Top Excellence Award, Actress in a Miniseries Fantasy/Romance Drama	Alice	Nominated	
The Seoul Awards	2017	Best Actress	The Lady in Dignity	Nominated	

=== State honors ===
Name of country, year given, and name of honor
Country Or Organization	Year	Honor Or Award	Ref.
Chung-Ang University	2005	Blue Dragon Achievement Award	
National Tax Service (Note: Honors are given at the Taxpayers' Day ceremony.)	2005	Prime Minister's Commendation	

=== Listicles ===
Name of publisher, year listed, name of listicle, and placement
Publisher	Year	Listicle	Placement	Ref.
Forbes	2018	Korea Power Celebrity 40	19th	
