= Real Fiction =

- Theatrical poster
- Hangul: 실제 상황
- Hanja: 實際 狀況
- RR: Silje sanghwang
- MR: Silche sanghwang
- Directed by: Kim Ki-duk
- Written by: Kim Ki-duk
- Produced by: Harry Lee; Shin Seung-soo
- Starring: Joo Jin-mo; Kim Jin-ah; Son Min-seok
- Cinematography: Hwang Cheol-hyeon
- Edited by: Kyung Min-ho
- Music by: Jeon Sang-yun
- Distributed by: Shin Seung-soo Productions
- Release date: June 24, 2000
- Running time: 82 minutes
- Country: South Korea
- Language: Korean

Real Fiction (Korean: 실제 상황; lit. 'State of Reality') is a 2000 crime-drama film from South Korean director Kim Ki-duk. It stars Joo Jin-mo, Kim Jin-ah and Son Min-seok. It was shot entirely in real-time, with no retakes, on a mixture of low quality video and purposefully "dirtied" film. The film was entered into the 23rd Moscow International Film Festival.

== Plot ==
Real Fiction follows a South Korean artist as he systematically seeks out, and then kills his real or imagined enemies.
