= Kim Hye-rin (artist) =

South Korean manhwa artist

- Born: September 4, 1962 (age 63); Changnyeong, South Kyongsang Province, South Korea
- Other name: Kim Gui-rin
- Occupation: Manhwa artist
- Years active: 1983–present

Korean name
- Hangul: 김혜린
- RR: Gim Hyerin
- MR: Kim Hyerin

Kim Hye-rin (born September 4, 1962) is a South Korean manhwa artist.

== Career ==
In 1983, Kim debuted with The Star of the North Sea. in 1986, she published Bird born to be wild in the man's world on Cartoon Plaza, a comic magazine. She showed interest in the wounds of Koreans and how they overcame them. However, Bird born to be wild in the man's world did not get much attention. After she finished The star of the North Sea in 1987, she presented The Dance in the Sky in 1988, a work that explored East Asia. She introduced the work Thermidor, a work that depicts a frustrated human race with the French Revolution as background. This work was for the comic magazine Renaissance. Thermidor got a good response and The Dance in the Sky succeeded. Kim became one of the most popular manhwa artists of her time. After The Dance in the Sky, Kim started to serialize The Sword of Fire on Daeng-gi since 1992, her longest series. However, Daeng-gi stopped publishing, the work was not completed and drifted thereafter. After several other serials were discontinued due to the closure of the magazines that carried them, The Sword of Fire was finally completed in 2005. Since the 2000s, the Korean cartoon publishing market has been stagnant due to the boost of 'webtoon' market.

== Characters ==
She chooses characters who live in a turbulent times and makes their love the subject of her works. In that respect, the influence of the 70's Japan Epic style such as Ikeda Riyoko and other genuine manga are projected. The main character overcomes obstacles and becomes a leader. She depicts resistance to oppression, the sentiment of 'Han', affection for the low-class who had to survive the turbulence. She gives villains a backstory. Also, she draws Asiatic feature very deeply. For example, In The Dance in the Sky the background is medieval China and Kim cited Chinese poetry. Likewise, in The Sword of Fire soliloquies and songs were used to express character's complexity. In that context, Kim's works are differentiated from common comic books of Japan in the 70's due to the incredible hardships faced by her main characters and her ability to craft works that are better suited to Korean emotions.
