= Olive (TV channel) =

- Country: South Korea

Programming
- Language: Korean

Ownership
- Owner: CJ ENM E&M Division

History
- Launched: 1 June 2000
- Replaced: OnStyle (second iteration)
- Closed: 19 May 2022
- Replaced by: tvN STORY (first iteration) tvN SPORTS (second iteration)
- Former names: First iteration: Channel F (2000 to 2002); Food Channel (2002 to 2003); Second iteration: OnStyle (2004 to 2021)

Links
- Website: olive.interest.me

Olive (Hangul: 올리브), sometimes stylized as O'live, is a television channel in South Korea owned by CJ ENM E&M Division, a division of CJ Group. It was originally a food and cooking channel, but now airs a variety of lifestyle programming.

The channel was later replaced by tvN Sports, sister channel to tvN's sporting programming.
