= Shim Yi-young =

South Korean actress (born 1980)

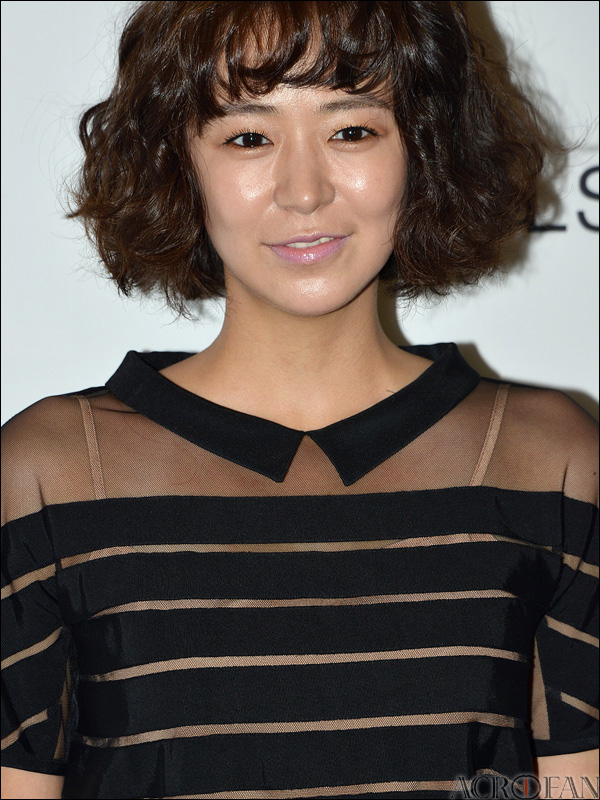
- Shim in 2013
- Born: Kim Jin-ah; January 31, 1980 (age 46); Mapo District, Seoul, South Korea
- Other names: Sim Yi-young; Shim E-young
- Occupation: Actress
- Years active: 2000–present
- Agent: Great Company
- Spouse: Choi Won-young (m. 2014)
- Children: 2

Korean name
- Hangul: 김진아
- RR: Gim Jina
- MR: Kim China

Stage name
- Hangul: 심이영
- Hanja: 沈李英
- RR: Sim Iyeong
- MR: Sim Iyŏng

Shim Yi-young (born Kim Jin-ah on January 31, 1980) is a South Korean actress.

== Career ==
Shim Yi-young made her acting debut in Kim Ki-duk's Real Fiction in 2000, and has since appeared in films such as Bongja, Paju, and Love, In Between, as well as television dramas such as The Sweet Thief and My Husband Got a Family.

She and Nam Ji-hyun host She and Her Car on MBC Life, an infotainment program that looks at cars from a woman's point of view, and gives suggestions about car trends and driving courses - topics previously thought to be exclusive to men. Shim also appears opposite former newscaster Jun Hyun-moo in We Are Mom and Dad from Today, a reality show airing on MBC Every 1 in which the two assume the roles of husband and wife and take care of babies; it aims to teach viewers about parenting while entertaining them with the onscreen romance.

== Personal life ==
Shim married actor Choi Won-young on February 28, 2014, at the Grand Ballroom of the COEX Walkerhill Hotel in Samseong-dong. Shim and Choi met while filming the 2013 TV series A Hundred Year Legacy, where they played a married couple. On June 23, 2014, Shim gave birth to their first child, a girl. The couple's second daughter was born June 14, 2017, in Ilsan.

== Filmography ==
=== Film ===
- The Hunt (2016)
- Precious Love (2013)
- Rockin' on Heaven's Door (2013)
- Spring, Snow (2012)
- Secrets, Objects (2011)
- Her Story Taking (short film from omnibus If You Were Me 5, 2011)
- How to Cross the Galaxy (short film, 2010)
- Love, In Between (2010)
- Paju (2009)
- Ice Bar (2006)
- Cruel Winter Blues (2006)
- Cracked Eggs and Noodles (2005)
- Marrying High School Girl (2004)
- No Comment (2002)
- Bongja (2000)
- Real Fiction (2000)

=== Television series ===
- Desperate Mrs. Seonju (MBC TV / 2024)
- Drama Stage – "XX+XY" (tvN / 2022)
- Monthly Magazine Home (JTBC / 2021) (cameo)
- Youth of May (KBS2 / 2021)
- My Wonderful Life (MBC / 2020–2021)
- Extracurricular (Netflix / 2020)
- Want a Taste? (SBS / 2019)
- Love Alarm (Netflix / 2019)
- At Eighteen (JTBC / 2019)
- Fates & Furies (SBS / 2018)
- Your House Helper (SBS/2018)
- Still 17 (SBS / 2018)
- Happy Sisters (SBS / 2017)
- The Legend of the Blue Sea (SBS / 2016) (cameo, ep 2, 3, 4, 12)
- Night Light (MBC / 2016)
- A Beautiful Mind (KBS2 / 2016)
- Five Enough (KBS2 / 2016)
- Solomon's Perjury (JTBC / 2016)
- My Mother Is a Daughter-in-law (SBS / 2015)
- Birth of a Beauty (SBS / 2014)
- Empress Ki (MBC / 2013) (cameo)
- The Suspicious Housekeeper (SBS / 2013)
- Goddess of Marriage (SBS / 2013)
- A Hundred Year Legacy (MBC / 2013)
- Vampire Prosecutor 2 (OCN / 2012) (guest appearance, ep 7)
- KBS Drama Special – "Culprit Among Friends" (KBS2 / 2012)
- KBS Drama Special – "Still Picture" (KBS2 / 2012)
- My Husband Got a Family (KBS2 / 2012)
- KBS Drama Special – "Duet" (KBS2 / 2011)
- Marry Me, Mary! (KBS2 / 2010)
- The Sweet Thief (OBS / 2009)
- MBC Best Theater – "A Legacy More Beautiful Than Tears" (MBC / 2004)
- Drama City – "S University Law Department Failure Case" (KBS2 / 2003)
- Open Drama: Man & Woman – "Love Front Heading North" (SBS / 2003)
- Drama City – "Forbidden Love" (KBS2 / 2002)
- That's Perfect (SBS / 2001)
- Law Firm (SBS / 2001)

=== Variety shows ===
- We Are Mom and Dad from Today (MBC Every 1 / 2013)
- She and Her Car (MBC Life / 2012–present)

== Theater ==
- Minja's Golden Age (2008)

== Awards and nominations ==
| Year | Award | Category | Nominated work | Result | Ref. |
|---|---|---|---|---|---|
| 2015 | SBS Drama Awards | Excellence Award, Actress in a Serial Drama | My Mother Is a Daughter-in-law | Nominated | |
| 2018 | SBS Drama Awards | Excellence Award, Actress in a Daily/Weekend Drama | Happy Sisters | Nominated | |
| 2019 | SBS Drama Awards | Top Excellence Award, Best Actress in a Serial Drama | Want a Taste? | Won | |
| 2020 | MBC Drama Awards | Golden Acting Award | My Wonderful Life | Won | |
| 2021 | 7th APAN Star Awards | Excellence Award, Actress in Serial Drama | My Wonderful Life | Won | |
| 2024 | SBS Drama Awards | Best Supporting Actress (Multi-Season Series) | The Escape of the Seven: Resurrection | Won | |
