= Choi Yoo-jung (actress) =

South Korean actress (born 1976)

- Born: August 21, 1976 (age 50); South Korea
- Occupation: Actress
- Years active: 2000–2005

Korean name
- Hangul: 최유정
- RR: Choe Yujeong
- MR: Ch'oe Yujŏng

Choi Yoo-jung (Korean: 최유정; born August 21, 1976) is a South Korean actress. She starred in television series such as A Saint and a Witch (2003), Sunlight Pours Down (2004) and Immortal Admiral Yi Sun-sin (2004).

== Filmography ==
=== Television series ===
Year	Title	Role
2003	First Love	
2003–2004	A Saint and a Witch	Oh Hyung-sook
2004	Sunlight Pours Down	
2004–2005	Immortal Admiral Yi Sun-sin	Bang Yeon-hwa

=== Film ===
Year	Title	Role
2000	Bichunmoo	Yeo-jin
2000	Ghost Taxi	Yoo-jung
2001	The Scent Of Love	Jung Da-hye
